= 13th Rajasthan Assembly =

List of members representing Rajasthan

14th Rajasthan Assembly
←	12th Rajasthan Assembly	14th Rajasthan Assembly	→

Overview
- Legislative body: Rajasthan Legislative Assembly
- Jurisdiction: Rajasthan, India
- Term: 5 years
- Members: 200

The 13th Rajasthan Legislative Assembly was elected in 2008.

This is a list of members representing the state of Rajasthan in the 13th Rajasthan Legislative Assembly. There were 200 members of the legislative assembly with the Bharatiya Janata Party forming the 73 seats, followed by the Indian National Congress with 112.

== By constituency ==
#	Constituency	Candidate	Party
1	Adarsh Nagar	Rafeek Khan	INC
2	Ahore	chagan Singh Rajpurohit	BJP
3	Ajmer North	Vasudev Devnani	BJP
4	Ajmer South (SC)	Anita Bhadel	BJP
5	Alwar Rural (SC)	Tikaram Jully	INC
6	Alwar Urban	Sanjay Sharma	BJP
7	Amber	Satish Poonia	BJP
8	Anta	Pramod Jain Bhaya	INC
9	Anupgarh (SC)	Santosh	BJP
10	Asind	Jabbar Singh	BJP
11	Aspur (ST)	Gopi Chand Meena	BJP
12	Bagidora (ST)	Mahendra Jeet Singh Malviya	INC
13	Bagru (SC)	Ganga Devi	INC
14	Bali	Pushpendra Singh	BJP
15	Bamanwas (ST)	Indra	INC
16	Bandikui	Gajraj	INC
17	Bansur	Shakuntala Rawat	INC
18	Banswara (ST)	Arjun Singh Bamnia	INC
19	Baran-Atru (SC)	Panachand	INC
20	Bari	Girraj Singh	INC
21	Bari Sadri	Lalit Kumar	BJP
22	Barmer	Mewaram Jain	INC
23	Baseri (SC)	Khiladi Lal Bairwa	INC
24	Bassi (ST)	Laxman Meena	IND
25	Bayana (SC)	Amar Singh	INC
26	Baytoo	Harish Chaudhary	INC
27	Beawar	Shankar Singh	BJP
28	Begun	Rajendra Bidhudi	INC
29	Behror	Baljeet Yadav	IND
30	Bhadra	Balwan Poonia	CPI(M)
31	Bharatpur	Subhash Garg	RLD
32	Bhilwara	Vitthal Shankar Avasthi	BJP
33	Bhim	Sudarshan Singh	INC
34	Bhinmal	Poora Ram Choudhary	BJP
35	Bhopalgarh (SC)	Pukhraj	RLP
36	Bikaner East	Siddhi Kumari	BJP
37	Bikaner West	B. D. Kalla	INC
38	Bilara (SC)	Heera Ram	INC
39	Bundi	Ashok Dogara	BJP
40	Chaksu (SC)	Ved Prakash Solanki	INC
41	Chhabra	Pratap Singh	BJP
42	Chittorgarh	Chandra Bhan	BJP
43	Chohtan (SC)	Padma Ram	INC
44	Chomu	Ramlal Sharma	BJP
45	Chorasi (ST)	Rajkumar Raot	BTP
46	Civil Lines	Pratap Singh Khachariyawas	INC
47	Dag (SC)	Kaluram	BJP
48	Dantaramgarh	Virendra Singh	INC
49	Dausa]	Murari Lal	INC
50	Deedwana	Chetan Choudhary	INC
51	Deeg - Kumher	Vishvendra Singh	INC
52	Degana	Vijaypal Mirdha	INC
53	Deoli-Uniara	Harish Meena	INC
54	Dhariawad (ST)	Gotam Lal	BJP
55	Dhod (SC)	Parasram Mordiya	INC
56	Dholpur	Shobharani Kushwah	BJP
57	Dudu (SC)	Babulal Nagar	IND
58	Dungargarh	Girdhari Lal	CPI(M)
59	Dungarpur (ST)	Ganesh Ghogra	INC
60	Fatehpur	Hakam Ali	INC
61	Ganganagar	Rajkumar	IND
62	Gangapur	Ramkesh	IND
63	Garhi (ST)	Kailash Chand Meena	BJP
64	Ghatol (ST)	Harendra Ninama	BJP
65	Gogunda (ST)	Pratap Lal Bheel	BJP
66	Gudamalani	Hemaram Choudhary	INC
67	Hanumangarh	Vinod Kumar	INC
68	Hawamahal	Mahesh Joshi	INC
69	Hindaun (SC)	Bharoshi Lal	INC
70	Hindoli	Ashok	INC
71	Jahazpur	Gopichand Meena	BJP
72	Jaisalmer	Rooparam	INC
73	Jaitaran	Avinash Gehlot	BJP
74	Jalore (SC)	Jogeshwar Garg	BJP
75	Jamwa Ramgarh (ST)	Gopal Meena	INC
76	Jayal (SC)	Manju Meghwal	INC
77	Jhadol (ST)	Babulal Kharadi	BJP
78	Jhalrapatan	Vasundhara Raje Scindia	BJP
79	Jhotwara	Lalchand Kataria	INC
80	Jhunjhunu	Brijendra Singh Ola	INC
81	Jodhpur	Manisha Panwar	INC
82	Kaman	Zahida	INC
83	Kapasan (SC)	Arjun Lal	BJP
84	Karanpur	Gurmeet Singh	INC
85	Karauli	Lakhan Singh	BSP
86	Kathumar (SC)	Babulal	INC
87	Kekri	Raghu Sharma	INC
88	Keshoraipatan (SC)	Shatrughan Gautam	BJP
89	Khajuwala (SC)	Govind Ram	INC
90	Khandar (SC)	Ashok	INC
91	Khandela	Mahadev Singh	IND
92	Khanpur	Narendra Nagar	BJP
93	Kherwara (ST)	Dayaram Parmar	INC
94	Khetri	Jitendra Singh	INC
95	Khinvsar	Hanuman Beniwal	RLP
96	Kishanganj (ST)	Nirmla	INC
97	Kishangarh	Suresh Tak	IND
98	Kishangarh Bas	Deepchand	BSP
99	Kishanpole	Ameen Kagzi	INC
100	Kolayat	Bhanwar Singh Bhati	INC
101	Kota North	Shanti Kumar Dhariwal	INC
102	Kota South	Sandeep Sharma	BJP
103	Kotputli	Rajendra Singh Yadav	INC
104	Kumbhalgarh	Surendra Singh	BJP
105	Kushalgarh (ST)	Ramila Khadia	IND
106	Laxmangarh	Govind Singh Dotasara	INC
107	Ladnun	Mukesh Bhakhar	INC
108	Ladpura	Kalpana Devi	BJP
109	Lalsot (ST)	Parsadi Lal Meena	INC
110	Lohawat	Kishna Ram Bishnoi	INC
111	Luni	Mahendra Bishnoi	INC
112	Lunkaransar	Sumit Godara	BJP
113	Mahuwa	Omprakash	IND
114	Makrana	Roopa Ram	BJP
115	Malpura	Kanhiya Lal	BJP
116	Malviya Nagar	Kalicharan	BJP
117	Mandal	Ram Lal	INC
118	Mandalgarh	Gopal Lal	BJP
119	Mandawa	Narendra Kumar	IND
120	Manohar Thana	Govind Prasad	BJP
121	Marwar Junction	Khushveer Singh	IND
122	Masuda	Rakesh Pareek	INC
123	Mavli	Dharm Narayan	BJP
124	Merta (SC)	Indra	RLP
125	Mundawar	Manjeet Dharmpal	BJP
126	Nadbai	Joginder Singh	BSP
127	Nagar	Vajib Ali	BSP
128	Nagaur	Mohan Ram	BJP
129	Nasirabad	Ramswaroop Lamba	BJP
130	Nathdwara	C. P. Joshi	INC
131	Nawalgarh	Rajkumar Sharma	INC
132	Nawan	Mahendra Choudhary	INC
133	Neem Ka Thana	Suresh Modi	INC
134	Nimbahera	Udai Lal Anjana	INC
135	Niwai (SC)	Prasant Bairwa	INC
136	Nohar	Amit	INC
137	Nokha	Bihari Lal Bishnoi	BJP
138	Osian	Divya Maderna	INC
139	Pachpadra	Madan Prajapat	INC
140	Pali	Gyanchand Parakh	BJP
141	Parbatsar	Ramniwas Gawdiya	INC
142	Phalodi	Pabba Ram Bishnoi	BJP
143	Phulera	Nirmal Kumawat	BJP
144	Pilani (SC)	J. P. Chandelia	INC
145	Pilibanga (SC)	Dharmendra Kumar	BJP
146	Pindwara-Abu (ST)	Samaram	BJP
147	Pipalda	Ramnarayan	INC
148	Pokaran	Saleh Mohammad	INC
149	Pratapgarh (ST)	Ram Lal Meena	INC
150	Pushkar	Suresh Singh Rawat	BJP
151	Raisinghnagar (SC)	Balbir Singh	BJP
152	Rajakhera	Rohit Bohra	INC
153	Rajgarh-Laxmangarh (ST)	Joharilal Meena	INC
154	Rajsamand	Kiran Maheshwari	BJP
155	Ramganj Mandi (SC)	Madan Dilawar	BJP
156	Ramgarh	Shafia Zubair	INC
157	Raniwara	Narayan Singh Dewal	BJP
158	Ratangarh	Abhinesh Maharshi	BJP
159	Reodar (SC)	Jagasi Ram	BJP
160	Sadulpur	Krishna Poonia	INC
161	Sadulshahar	Jagdish Jangid	INC
162	Sagwara (ST)	Ram Prasad	BTP
163	Sahara	Kailash Chandra Trivedi	INC
164	Salumber (ST)	Amrit Lal	BJP
165	Sanchore	Sukhram Bishnoi	INC
166	Sanganer	Ashok Lahoty	BJP
167	Sangaria	Gurdeep Singh	BJP
168	Sangod	Bharat Singh Kundanpur	INC
169	Sapotra (ST)	Ramesh	INC
170	Sardarpura	Ashok Gehlot	INC
171	Sardarshahar	Bhanwar Lal	INC
172	Sawai Madhopur	Danish Abrar	INC
173	Shahpura	Alok Beniwal	IND
174	Shahpura (SC)	Kailash Chandra Meghwal	BJP
175	Sheo	Ameen Khan	INC
176	Shergarh	Meena Kanwar	INC
177	Sikar	Rajendra Pareek	INC
178	Sikrai (SC)	Mamta Bhupesh	INC
179	Sirohi	Sanyam Lodha	IND
180	Siwana	Hameersingh Bhayal	BJP
181	Sojat (SC)	Shobha Chouhan	BJP
182	Soorsagar	Suryakanta Vyas	BJP
183	Srimadhopur	Deependra Singh Shekhawat	INC
184	Sujangarh (SC)	Master Bhanwarlal Meghwal	INC
185	Sumerpur	Joraram Kumawat	BJP
186	Surajgarh	Subhash Poonia	BJP
187	Suratgarh	Rampratap	BJP
188	Taranagar	Narendra Budania	INC
189	Thanagazi	Kanti Prasad	IND
190	Tijara	Sandip Kumar	BSP
191	Todabhim (ST)	Ghanshyam	INC
192	Tonk	Sachin Pilot	INC
193	Udaipur	Gulab Chand Kataria	BJP
194	Udaipur Rural (ST)	Phool Singh Meena	BJP
195	Udaipurwati	Shubhkaran Choudhary	BJP
196	Vallabnagar	M. Randhir Singh	IND
197	Vidhyadhar Nagar	Narpat Singh Rajvi	BJP
198	Viratnagar	Indraj gurjar	INC
199	Weir (SC)	Bhajan Lal	INC

== Communist Party of India (Marxist) ==
- Pawan Kumar Duggal
- Pemaram
- Amra Ram

== Independent ==
- Ajay Dhandia
- Harji Ram Burdak
- Brahmdev Kumawat
- Nanalal Ninama
- Kanhaiya Lal Awasthi
- Ram Kishor Siani
- Parsadi Lal Meena
- Gurmeet Singh Kunnar
- Jaideep Dudi
- Jeevaram Choudhary
- Dilip Choudhary
- Ranveer Pahalwan
- Govind Singh Lulwa khas
- Durg Singh

== Indian National Congress ==
- Nathu Ram Sinodiya
- Naseem Akhtar Insaf
- Mahendra Singh
- Raghu Sharma
- Aimaduddin Ahmad Khan
- Major O P Yadav
- Tikaram Julee
- Kanta Garasiya
- Arjun Singh Bamaniya
- Mahendrajeet Singh
- Pramod Jain 'Bhaya'
- Nirmala Sahria
- Panachand Meghwal
- Karan Singh Rathore
- Ameen Khan
- Mewaram Jain
- Col Sonaram Choudhary
- Madan Prajapat
- Hemaram Choudhary
- Padmaram Meghwal
- Zahida
- Ramlal Jat
- Kailash Chandra Trivedi
- Mahaveer Prasad Jingar
- Pradeep Kumar Singh
- Virendra Beniwal
- Manglaram Godara
- C L Premi
- Shankar Lal Bairwa
- Rajender Singh Bidhudi
- Govind Singh Lulwa khas
- Udailal Anjana
- Prakash Chandra Chaudhary
- Hazi Maqbool Mandelia
- Master Bhanwarlal
- Mamta Bhupesh
- Murari Lal Meena
- Girraj Singh Malinga
- Lal Shankar Gatiya
- Raiya Meena
- Surendra Kumar
- Shankar Lal Ahari
- Santosh Kumar Saharan
- Ganga Jal Meel
- Daulat Raj Nayak
- Paramnavadeep Singh
- Vinod Kumar Lilawali
- Aadram Meghwal
- Bhagwan Sahay Saini
- Babu Lal Nagar
- Ganga Sahay Sharma
- Gopal Meena
- Brij Kishore Sharma
- Pratap Singh
- Ganga Devi
- Shaleh Mohammad
- Bhag Raj Chowdhary
- Ramlal Meghwal
- Ratan Dewasi
- Madan Lal Verma
- Kailash Chand Meena
- Sharwan Kumar
- Brijendra Singh Ola
- Rita Choudhary
- Rajkumar Sharma
- Rajendra Singh Gudha
- Jitendra Singh
- Om Joshi
- Mahipal Maderana
- Ashok Hakliya
- Malkhan Singh BISHNOI
- Bharosi Lal Jatav
- Ramesh Chand Meena
- Premchand Nagar
- Bharat Singh Kundanpur
- Shanti Kumar Dhariwal
- Rupa Ram Dudi
- Manju Devi
- Zakir Hussain Gaisawat
- Mahendra Choudhary
- Bina Kak
- Ganesh Singh Parmar
- Ramkesh Meena
- Nawal Kishor Meena
- Alauddin Azad
- Ashok Bairwa 'Khandar'
- Bhanwaru Khan
- Govind Singh Dotasra
- Rajendra Pareek
- Ramesh Khandelwal
- Deependra Singh
- Ganga Ben Garasiya
- Kamal Bairwa
- Zakiya
- Ramnarayan Meena
- Mangi Lal Garasiya
- Dayaram Parmar
- Sajjan Katara
- Pushkar Lal Dangi
- Gajendra Singh Shaktawat
- Basanti Devi Meena
- Nagraj Meena
- Brahmdev Kumawat

== Janata Dal (United) ==
- Fateh Singh
