= Jhunjhunu Lok Sabha constituency =

Lok Sabha constituency in Rajasthan

Coordinates: 28.1°N 75.4°E

Jhunjhunu
- Lok Sabha constituency
- Interactive Map Outlining Jhunjhunu Lok Sabha Constituency

Constituency details
- Country: India
- Region: North India
- State: Rajasthan
- Assembly constituencies: Pilani; Surajgarh; Jhunjhunu; Mandawa; Nawalgarh; Udaipurwati; Khetri; Fatehpur
- Established: 1952
- Reservation: None

Member of Parliament
- 18th Lok Sabha
- Incumbent Brijendra Singh Ola
- Party: Indian National Congress
- Elected year: 2024

Jhunjhunu (Hindi pronunciation: [d͡ʒʱʊ̃d͡ʒʱʊn̪uː]) is one of the 25 Lok Sabha (parliamentary) constituencies in Rajasthan state in western India. Brijendra Singh Ola is incumbent member of the Lok Sabha from Jhunjhunu.

== Assembly segments ==
Presently, Jhunjhunu Lok Sabha constituency comprises Eight Vidhan Sabha (legislative assembly) segments. These are:

#	Name	District	Member	Party	2024 Lead
25	Pilani (SC)	Jhunjhunu	Pitram Singh Kala	INC	INC
26	Surajgarh	Jhunjhunu	Sharwan Kumar	INC	BJP
27	Jhunjhunu	Jhunjhunu	Rajendra Bhamboo	BJP	INC
28	Mandawa	Jhunjhunu	Rita Choudhary	INC	INC
29	Nawalgarh	Jhunjhunu	Vikram Singh Jakhal	BJP	BJP
30	Udaipurwati	Jhunjhunu	Bhagawana Ram Saini	INC	BJP
31	Khetri	Jhunjhunu	Dharmpal Gurjar	BJP	BJP
32	Fatehpur	Sikar	Hakam Ali Khan	INC	INC

== Members of Parliament ==
Year	Member	Party
1952	Radheshyam Morarka	Indian National Congress
1957	Radheshyam Morarka	Indian National Congress
1962	Radheshyam Morarka	Indian National Congress
1967	R. K. Birla	Swatantra Party
1971	Shivnath Singh Gill	Indian National Congress
1977	Kanhaiya Lal	Janata Party
1980	Bhim Singh	Janata Party
1984	Mohd. Ayub Khan	Indian National Congress
1989	Jagdeep Dhankhar	Janata Dal
1991	Mohd. Ayub Khan	Indian National Congress
1996	Sis Ram Ola	All India Indira Congress (T)
1998	Sis Ram Ola	Independent
1999	Sis Ram Ola	Indian National Congress
2004	Sis Ram Ola	Indian National Congress
2009	Sis Ram Ola	Indian National Congress
2014	Santosh Ahlawat	Bharatiya Janata Party
2019	Narendra Kumar	Bharatiya Janata Party
2024	Brijendra Singh Ola	Indian National Congress

== Election results ==
=== 2024 ===
2024 Indian general election: Jhunjhunu
Party	Candidate	Votes	%	±%
INC	Brijendra Singh Ola	553,168	49.44	▲13.11
BJP	Shubhkaran Choudhary	5,34,933	47.81	▼13.76
NOTA	None of the above	6,632	0.61	
Majority		18,235	1.63	
Turnout		10,94,900	52.93	▼9.18
INC gain from BJP		Swing		

=== 2019 ===
2019 Indian general elections: Jhunjhunu
Party	Candidate	Votes	%	±%
BJP	Narendra Kumar	738,163	61.57	▲12.67
INC	Sharwan Kumar	4,35,616	36.33	▲10.86
NOTA	None of the above	8,497	0.71	N/A
Independent	Sharwan Kumar	5,582	0.47	N/A
RRP	Dr. Tejpal Katewa	803	0.07	New
Majority		3,02,547	25.24	▲2.01
Turnout		12,03,702	62.11	▲2.69
BJP hold		Swing		

=== 2014 Lok Sabha ===
2014 Indian general elections: Jhunjhunu
Party	Candidate	Votes	%	±%
BJP	Santosh Ahlawat	488,181	48.90	▲8.88
INC	Raj Bala Ola	2,54,347	25.47	▼25.42
Independent	Dr. Rajkumar Sharma	2,06,288	20.66	▲20.55
Independent	Rajbala	11,740	1.18	▲1.06
BSP	Rahisa Bano	10,423	1.04	▼2.61
Majority		2,33,835	23.23	▲12.38
Turnout		10,08,641	59.42	▲17.39
BJP gain from INC		Swing		

=== 2009 Lok Sabha ===
2009 Indian general elections: Jhunjhunu
Party	Candidate	Votes	%	±%
INC	Sis Ram Ola	306,330	50.87	−−−
BJP	Dr. Dasrath Singh Shekhawat	2,40,998	40.02	−−−
BSP	Khatri Mustaq	21,994	3.65	−−−
Independent	Sher Singh	6,928	1.15	−−−
Majority		65,332	10.85	−−−
Turnout		6,02,155	42.03	−−−
INC hold		Swing		

=== 1998 ===
1998 Indian general election: Jhunjhunu
Party	Candidate	Votes	%	±%
AIIC(S)	Sis Ram Ola	3,38,526	44.25	---
BJP	Madan Lal Saini	3,00,667	39.3	−−−
INC	Jagdeep Dhankhar	94,376	12.34	−−−
Majority		37,859	4.95	−−−
Turnout		765,070	67.08	−−−
Registered electors		11,53,561		
All India Indira Congress (Secular) gain from AIIC(T)		Swing		

== See also ==
- Jhunjhunu district
- List of constituencies of the Lok Sabha
