= 1957 Rajasthan Legislative Assembly election =

Election in Indian state

- 11 March 1957

All 176 seats in the Rajasthan Legislative Assembly, 1957 89 seats needed for a majority
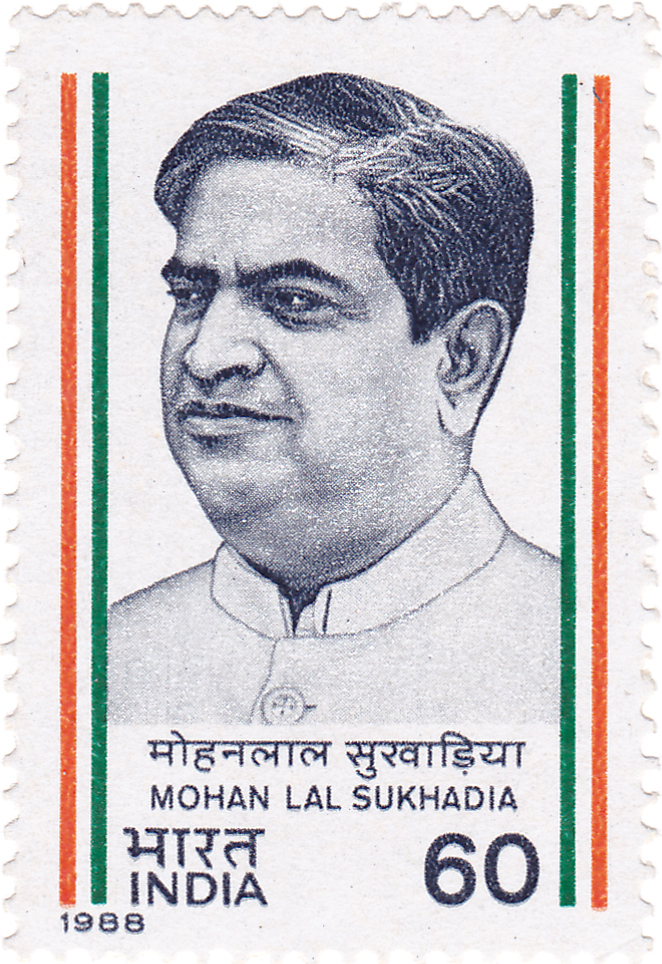
	Majority party	Minority party
		RRP
Leader	Mohan Lal Sukhadia	-
Party	INC	RRP
Leader's seat	Udaipur	-
Seats won	119	17
Seat change	▲37	▼9
Popular vote	21,41,931	4,69,540
Percentage	45.13 %	9.89
Swing	▲5.67 %	▼2.37
CM before election
Mohan Lal Sukhadia
INC
Elected CM
Mohan Lal Sukhadia
INC

Elections to the second Rajasthan Legislative Assembly were held in 1957.

== State Reorganization ==
On 1 November 1956, under States Reorganisation Act, 1956, the Ajmer State, the Abu Road taluka of the Banaskantha district of Bombay State, the Sunel enclave of the Mandsaur district and the Lohara sub-tehsil of the Hissar district of the Punjab was merged with Rajasthan while the Sironj sub-division of the Kota district of Rajasthan was transferred to Madhya Pradesh. This resulted in the change in assembly constituencies from 140 with 160 seats to 136 with 176 seats in 1957 assembly elections.

== Constituencies ==
Due to States Reorganisation Act 1956, Rajasthan assembly constituencies changed from 140 with 160 seats to 136 with 176 seats. 96 of them were single member constituencies while the number of double member constituencies was 40. 28 of the double member constituencies were reserved for Scheduled Caste while 4 of the single member and 12 of the double member constituencies (total 16 constituencies) were reserved for Schedule Tribe. There were 48,43,841 electors in single member constituencies, while 38,92,288 were in double member constituencies. Total 737 candidates contested for the 176 seats of the 136 constituencies in the Assembly. Poll percentage in the 1957 election was 38.45%.

== Political parties ==
Four national parties, Communist Party of India, Indian National Congress, Praja Socialist Party and Bharatiya Jana Sangha along with the state party Akhil Bharatiya Ram Rajya Parishad took part in the assembly election. Congress was the clear winner in the elections winning 67.61% of the total seats (i.~e. 119/176 seats) with a vote share of 45.13%. Mohan Lal Sukhadia from the Congress party became the Chief Minister again.

== Results ==
Summary of results of the 1957 Rajasthan Legislative Assembly election
Party	Flag	Seats Contested	Won	Net Change in seats	% of Seats	Votes	Vote %	Change in vote %
Indian National Congress		176	119	▲37	67.61	21,41,931	45.13	▲5.67
Akhil Bharatiya Ram Rajya Parishad		60	17	▼7	9.66	4,69,540	9.89	▼2.37
Bharatiya Jana Sangh		51	6	▼2	3.41	2,63,443	5.55	▼0.38
Praja Socialist Party		27	1	New	0.57	1,17,532	2.48	New
Communist Party of India		24	1	▲1	0.57	1,43,547	3.02	▲2.49
Independent		399	32	▼3	18.18	16,10,465	33.93	N/A
		Total Seats	176 (▲16)	Voters	1,24,37,064	Turnout	47,46,458 (38.16%)	

== Elected members ==
Constituency	Reserved for (SC/ST/None)	Member	Party
Khetri (SC)	SC	Mahadeo Prashad	Indian National Congress
Khetri (SC)	SC	Sish Ram Ola	Indian National Congress
Pilani	None	Sumitra	Indian National Congress
Mandawa	None	Lachhu Ram	Communist Party of India
Jhunjhunu	None	Narottam Lal	Indian National Congress
Gudha	None	Shivnath Singh	Indian National Congress
Nawalgarh	None	Shri Ram	Independent
Fatehpur	None	Abdul Gaffar Khan	Indian National Congress
Lachhmangarh	None	Kishan Singh	Indian National Congress
Sikar	None	Jagdish Prasad	Bharatiya Jana Sangh
Singrawat	None	Ram Deo Singh	Indian National Congress
Danta Ramgarh	None	Madan Singh	Akhil Bharatiya Ram Rajya Parishad
Sri Madhopur	None	Bhaniron Singh	Bharatiya Jana Sangh
Neem Ka Thana (SC)	SC	Narayan Lal	Indian National Congress
Neem Ka Thana (SC)	SC	Gyan Chand	Indian National Congress
Hawa Mahal	None	Ram Kishore	Indian National Congress
Johri Bazar	None	Satish	Bharatiya Jana Sangh
Kishanpole	None	Chandra Kala	Indian National Congress
Amber (SC)	SC	Sahdeo	Indian National Congress
Amber (SC)	SC	Hari Shankar S. Shastri	Indian National Congress
Phulera	None	P. K. Chaudhri	Indian National Congress
Dudu (SC)	SC	Laduram Sulaniya	Akhil Bharatiya Ram Rajya Parishad
Dudu (SC)	SC	Narendra Singh	Akhil Bharatiya Ram Rajya Parishad
Lalsot	None	Nathu Lal	Akhil Bharatiya Ram Rajya Parishad
Lalsot	None	Prabhu Lal	Akhil Bharatiya Ram Rajya Parishad
Dausa (ST)	ST	Ram Dhan	Independent
Dausa (ST)	ST	Gajja	Independent
Bandikui	None	Bishambher Nath Joshi	Indian National Congress
Jamwa Ramgarh (SC)	SC	Ram Lal	Indian National Congress
Jamwa Ramgarh (SC)	SC	Doongersi Dass	Independent
Bairath	None	Mukti Lal	Independent
Kotputli	None	Ram Karan Singh	Bharatiya Jana Sangh
Behror	None	Chander Singh	Independent
Bansur	None	Badri Prasad Gupta	Indian National Congress
Tijara (SC)	SC	Sampat Ram	Indian National Congress
Tijara (SC)	SC	Ghasi Ram Yadav	Indian National Congress
Alwar	None	Chhotu Singh	Indian National Congress
Ramgarh	None	Ganga Devi	Indian National Congress
Lachman Garh	SC	Gokal Chand	Indian National Congress
Lachman Garh	SC	Bhola Nath	Indian National Congress
Rajgarh	ST	Raghubir Singh	Akhil Bharatiya Ram Rajya Parishad
Rajgarh	ST	Hari Kishan	Indian National Congress
Kaman	None	Nathi Singh	Independent
Deeg	None	Jugal Kishore Chaturvedi	Indian National Congress
Bharatpur	None	Hoti Lal	Independent
Weir	SC	Raja Man Singh	Independent
Weir	SC	Vishwa Priya	Indian National Congress
Bayana	SC	Goverdhan Singh	Indian National Congress
Bayana	SC	Shribhan Singh	Indian National Congress
Bari	None	Subedar Singh	Indian National Congress
Dholpur	None	Bahadur Singh	Indian National Congress
Rajakhera	None	Mahendra Singh	Independent
Mahwa	ST	Tika Ram Paliwal	Indian National Congress
Mahwa	ST	Gopi Sahai	Indian National Congress
Karauli	SC	Brijendra Pal	Independent
Karauli	SC	Ummed	Indian National Congress
Sawai Madhopur	SC	Mangi Lal	Indian National Congress
Sawai Madhopur	SC	Abid Ali	Indian National Congress
Gangapur	ST	Ridhi Chand	Independent
Gangapur	ST	Prathi Raj	Independent
Malpura	None	Damodar Lal Vyas	Indian National Congress
Tonk	SC	Lalu Ram	Indian National Congress
Tonk	SC	Narain Singh	Indian National Congress
Uniara	None	Sardar Singh	Akhil Bharatiya Ram Rajya Parishad
Hindoli	ST	Modu Lal	Indian National Congress
Hindoli	ST	Bhanwar Lal	Indian National Congress
Bundi	None	Sajjan Singh	Indian National Congress
Kotah	None	Rameshwar Dayal	Indian National Congress
Pipalda	ST	Rikhab Chand	Indian National Congress
Pipalda	ST	Ram Narayan	Bharatiya Jana Sangh
Baran	SC	Anandi Devi	Indian National Congress
Baran	SC	Dalip Singh	Indian National Congress
Chhabra	SC	Dhanna Lal Harit	Indian National Congress
Chhabra	SC	Daya Krishna	Bharatiya Jana Sangh
Aklera	ST	Bhairavlal Kala Badal	Indian National Congress
Aklera	ST	Sampat Raj	Indian National Congress
Jhalrapatan	None	Jayandra Singh	Indian National Congress
Dag	SC	Ram Chandra	Indian National Congress
Dag	SC	Harish Chandra	Indian National Congress
Begun	None	Sugan Chand	Indian National Congress
Chittorgarh	None	Lal Singh	Indian National Congress
Nimbahera	None	Shri Niwas	Indian National Congress
Kapasin	SC	Jai Chand	Indian National Congress
Kapasin	SC	Bhawani Shanker	Indian National Congress
Partapgarh	ST	Amrit Lal	Indian National Congress
Partapgarh	ST	Amra	Indian National Congress
Banswara	ST	Mogji	Independent
Ghatol	None	Hari Deo	Indian National Congress
Bagidora	None	Nathu Ram	Indian National Congress
Kushalgarh	None	Heera	Independent
Sagwara	None	Bheekha Bhai	Indian National Congress
Dungarpur	None	Bal Mukund	Independent
Aspur	None	Bhogi Lal Pandiya	Indian National Congress
Vallabhnagar	SC	Har Prasad	Indian National Congress
Vallabhnagar	SC	Gulab Singh	Indian National Congress
Salumber	ST	Sohan Lal	Indian National Congress
Salumber	ST	Phoola	Indian National Congress
Sarada	ST	Devi Lal	Indian National Congress
Phalasia	ST	Vidhya Sagar	Indian National Congress
Gogunda	ST	Laxman	Indian National Congress
Udaipur	None	Mohan Lal Sukhadia	Indian National Congress
Mavli	None	Janardan Rai	Indian National Congress
Rajsamand	None	Niranjan Nath	Indian National Congress
Nathdwara	None	Kishan Lal	Indian National Congress
Kumbhalgarh	None	Manohar	Indian National Congress
Bhim	None	Fateh Singh	Independent
Asind	None	Jai Singh Ranawat	Indian National Congress
Banera	None	Tej Mal	Indian National Congress
Shahpura	SC	Kana	Indian National Congress
Shahpura	SC	Ram Prasad	Indian National Congress
Mandalgarh	None	Ganpati Lal	Indian National Congress
Bhilwara	None	Kamla Bai	Indian National Congress
Mandal	ST	Shiv Charan Das	Akhil Bharatiya Ram Rajya Parishad
Mandal	ST	Kalu	Akhil Bharatiya Ram Rajya Parishad
Ajmer City West	None	Arjan Das	Independent
Ajmer City East	None	Mahendra Singh	Independent
Pushkar	None	Prabha	Indian National Congress
Nasirabad	None	Jwala Prasad	Indian National Congress
Kishangarh	None	Purshottam Lal	Indian National Congress
Kekri	SC	Hazari Ram	Indian National Congress
Kekri	SC	Hari Bhau Upadhyaya	Indian National Congress
Beawar	None	Brij Mohan Lal Sharma	Indian National Congress
Masuda	None	Narain Singh	Indian National Congress
Raipur	None	Shanker Lal	Indian National Congress
Sojat	None	Teja Ram	Indian National Congress
Kharchi	SC	Veno	Independent
Kharchi	SC	Manroop	Independent
Pali	None	Mool Chand	Indian National Congress
Bali	ST	Moti	Independent
Bali	ST	Deva	Indian National Congress
Abu	None	Dalpat Singh	Independent
Abu	None	Veerka	Independent
Sirohi	SC	Mohabat Singh	Indian National Congress
Sanchore	None	Laxmi Chand	Akhil Bharatiya Ram Rajya Parishad
Raniwara	None	Mangal Singh	Akhil Bharatiya Ram Rajya Parishad
Jalore	SC	Narpat Singh	Akhil Bharatiya Ram Rajya Parishad
Jalore	SC	Hasiya	Akhil Bharatiya Ram Rajya Parishad
Ahore	None	Madho Singh	Indian National Congress
Chohtan	None	Vali Mohammed	Indian National Congress
Barmer	None	Tan Singh	Akhil Bharatiya Ram Rajya Parishad
Balotra	SC	Anop Singh	Akhil Bharatiya Ram Rajya Parishad
Balotra	SC	Rawat	Indian National Congress
Guda Malani	None	Ram Dan	Indian National Congress
Jaisalmer	None	Hukam Singh	Independent
Phalodi	SC	Keshri Singh	Akhil Bharatiya Ram Rajya Parishad
Phalodi	SC	Suraj Mal	Akhil Bharatiya Ram Rajya Parishad
Osian	None	Paras Ram	Indian National Congress
Bilara	None	Bhairon Singh	Indian National Congress
Jodhpur City I	None	Anand Singh	Indian National Congress
Jodhpur City Ii	None	Barkatullah Khan	Indian National Congress
Luni	None	Poonam Chand	Indian National Congress
Bikaner City	None	Murli Dhar	Praja Socialist Party
Lunkaransar	None	Bhim Sen	Indian National Congress
Nokha	SC	Rupa Ram	Independent
Nokha	SC	Girdhari Lal	Independent
Raisinghnagar	None	Chuni Lal	Indian National Congress
Karanpur	None	Satwant Kaur	Indian National Congress
Ganganagar	None	Dev Nath	Indian National Congress
Suratgarh	None	Raja Ram	Indian National Congress
Hanumangarh	None	Sheopat Singh	Independent
Nohar	SC	Dharam Pal	Indian National Congress
Nohar	SC	Ram Kishan	Independent
Churu	SC	Rawata	Indian National Congress
Churu	SC	Mohar Singh	Independent
Sardar Shahar	None	Chandan Mal	Indian National Congress
Dungargarh	None	Daulat Ram	Indian National Congress
Ratangarh	None	Kishna	Independent
Sujangarh	None	Shanno Devi	Independent
Nagaur	None	Nathu Ram Nirdha	Indian National Congress
Jayal	None	Manak Chand	Indian National Congress
Ladnu	None	Ram Niwas Mirdha	Indian National Congress
Deedwana	None	Moti Lal	Indian National Congress
Nawan	SC	Jeth Mal	Indian National Congress
Nawan	SC	Kishan Lal	Indian National Congress
Degana	None	Gauri Punia	Indian National Congress
Merta	None	Gopal Lal	Indian National Congress

== See also ==
- 1957 elections in India
- 1952 Rajasthan Legislative Assembly election
