= Katli River =

- Katli River in Jhunjhunu, Rajasthan

Location
- Country: India
- State: Rajasthan
- Districts: Sikar, Jhunjhunu, Churu
- Villages: Ganeshwar, Khandela, Guhala, Panchlangi, Bagholi, Ponkh, Kakrana, Deeppura, Mainpura, Norangpura, Gadhla Kalan, Khatkar, Ked, Batiwar, Basmana, Shivnathpura, Natas, Hansalsar, Gowla,Bhadunda Kalan, Bhadunda khurd, Vrindavan, Makhar, Islampur, Chnana, Solana, Sultana, Bagar, Sulkhania

Physical characteristics
- Source: Ganeshwar Hills
  - location: Aravalli Range, Ganeshwar, Sikar, Rajasthan, India
  - coordinates: 27°40.735′N 75°51.3867′E
- Length: 100 km (62 mi)
- Width
  - minimum: 50 m (160 ft)
  - maximum: 500 m (1,600 ft)

The Katli River is a rainfed seasonal river of Shekhawati region of Rajasthan in India.

It originates from Aravalli Range and empties in center of its Inland drainage basin in northwest region of Churu district. This 100-km length mostly flows through Jhunjhunu District. The Katli river is the main source of coarse sand used for construction in the nearby region.

== Ganeshwar civilization ==
Ganeshwar is a village in Neem Ka Thana Tehsil in the Sikar District. Excavations have revealed ancient sites, with remains of a 4000 years old civilization. The site is located at source of river Kantali, which used to join river Drishadvati, near Soni-Bhadra on the north.

Historian Ratan Lal Mishra wrote that, Red pottery with black portraiture was found which is estimated to be belonging to 2500–2000 BC was found when Ganeshwar was excavated in 1977.

Ganeshwar is located near the copper mines of the Sikar-Jhunjhunu area of the Khetri copper belt in Rajasthan. It mainly supplied copper objects to Harappa.

Copper objects, microliths & pottery were found throughout the deposits.

Copper objects included arrowheads, spearheads, fish hooks, bangles and chisels. Microliths, discovered here, represent a highly evolved geometric industry, the principal tool-types being blunted-back blades, obliquely-blunted blades, lunates, triangles and points. The raw materials employed for the industry include quartz, garnet, and occasionally jasper. The Pottery found represents OCP culture and includes storage jars, vases, basins, bowls, lids and miniature pots.

== See also ==
- Ked (village)
- Jhunjhunu
- Jhunjhunu District
