= Dhani Charan =

Dhani Charan Birmi
- Village
- Dhani Charan
- Location in Rajasthan, India Dhani Charan (India)
- Coordinates: 28.1933089°N 75.1965609°E
- Country: India
- State: Rajasthan
- District: Jhunjhunu
- Tehsil: Malsisar

Government
  - Type: Panchayati raj (India)
  - Body: Gram panchayat
- Elevation: 278 m (912 ft)

Population (2011)
  - Total: 687

Languages
  - Official: Marwari
  - Other spoken: Hindi
- Time zone: UTC+5:30 (IST)
- Pin Code: 333001
- Telephone code: 01595
- ISO 3166 code: IN-RJ
- Vehicle registration: RJ-10
- Website: jhunjhunu.rajasthan.gov.in

Dhani Charan is a village located in the Malsisar Tehsil of Jhunjhunu district, Rajasthan, India. It have total population of 687 and area of 2.87 km^{2}. Dhani Charan is associated with villages Panchayat Birmi and Malsisar Tehsil. It lies under the legislative assembly seat of Mandawa and loksabha seat of Jhunjhunu. The current MP is Narendra Kumar. The nearest airports are Bhiwani at 100 km, Jaipur at 197 km and Delhi airport at 254 km .
