= Jhunjhunu Assembly constituency =

Constituency of the Rajasthan legislative assembly in India

Coordinates: 28.13°N 75.40°E

Jhunjhunu
- Constituency No. 27 for the Rajasthan Legislative Assembly

Constituency details
- Country: India
- Region: North India
- State: Rajasthan
- District: Jhunjhunu district
- Established: 1951
- Reservation: None

Member of Legislative Assembly
- 16th Rajasthan Legislative Assembly
- Incumbent Rajendra Bhamboo
- Party: BJP
- Elected year: 2024

Jhunjhunu Assembly constituency is one of the constituencies of Rajasthan Legislative Assembly in the Jhunjhunu Lok Sabha constituency.

Map of Jhunjhunun Constituency

Jhunujhunu constituency covers all voters from parts of Jhunjhunu tehsil, which include ILRC Jhunjhunu including Jhunjhunu Municipal Board and Bagar Municipal Board; Village Bhadunda Kalan, Bhadunda Khurdand ILRC Kulod Kalan, and parts of Chirawa which include Chanana, Solana, Kishorepura, Kithana, Sultana and Sari of ILRC Sultana.

== Members of the Legislative Assembly ==
Year	Name	Party
1951	Narottam Lal Joshi	Indian National Congress
1957	Narottam Lal Joshi	Indian National Congress
1962	Sumitra Singh	Indian National Congress
1967	Sumitra Singh	Indian National Congress
1972	Sumitra Singh	Indian National Congress
1977	Sumitra Singh	Indian National Congress
1980	Shish Ram Ola	Indian National Congress
1985	Shish Ram Ola	Indian National Congress
1990	Mohd Mahir Azad	Janata Dal
1993	Shish Ram Ola	Indian National Congress
1998	Sumitra Singh	Independent
2003	Sumitra Singh	Bharatiya Janata Party
2008	Brijendra Singh Ola	Indian National Congress
2013	Brijendra Singh Ola	Indian National Congress
2018	Brijendra Singh Ola	Indian National Congress
2023	Brijendra Singh Ola	Indian National Congress
2024^	Rajendra Bhamboo	Bharatiya Janata Party

- ^ denotes by-election

== Election results ==
=== 2024 bypoll ===
2024 Rajasthan Legislative Assembly by-election: Jhunjhunu
Party	Candidate	Votes	%	±%
BJP	Rajendra Bhamboo	90,425	49.51	▲19.82
INC	Amit Ola	47,577	26.05	▼18.43
Independent	Rajendra Singh Gudha	38,751	21.22	New
NOTA	None of the Above	1,365	0.75	▲0.04
Majority		42,848	23.46	▲8.67
Turnout		1,82,640		
BJP gain from INC		Swing		

=== 2023 ===
2023 Rajasthan Legislative Assembly election: Jhunjhunu
Party	Candidate	Votes	%	±%
INC	Brijendra Singh Ola	86,798	44.48	−0.54
BJP	Nisheet Kumar	57,935	29.69	+8.64
Independent	Rajendra Singh Bhamboo	42,407	21.73	
ASP(KR)	Pankaj Dhankhar	3,095	1.59	
NOTA	None of the above	1,385	0.71	−0.22
Majority		28,863	14.79	−9.18
Turnout		195,142	71.65	+1.69
INC hold		Swing		

=== 2018 ===
2018 Rajasthan Legislative Assembly election: Jhunjhunu
Party	Candidate	Votes	%	±%
INC	Brijendra Singh Ola	76,177	45.02	
BJP	Rajendra Singh Bhamboo	35,612	21.05	
Independent	Nisheet Kumar Alias Bablu Choudhary	29,410	17.38	
Independent	Yashwardhan Singh	12,007	7.1	
BSP	Rajesh	5,933	3.51	
Independent	Dalip	2,006	1.19	
AAP	Rajkumar Moond	1,900	1.12	
RLP	Rajendra Fauji	1,598	0.94	
NOTA	None of the above	1,580	0.93	
Majority		40,565	23.97	
Turnout		169,196	69.96	
INC hold		Swing		

== See also ==
- Member of the Legislative Assembly (India)
