= List of speakers of the Rajasthan Legislative Assembly =

Presiding officer of Rajasthan state legislative assembly

Speaker of the Rajasthan Legislative Assembly
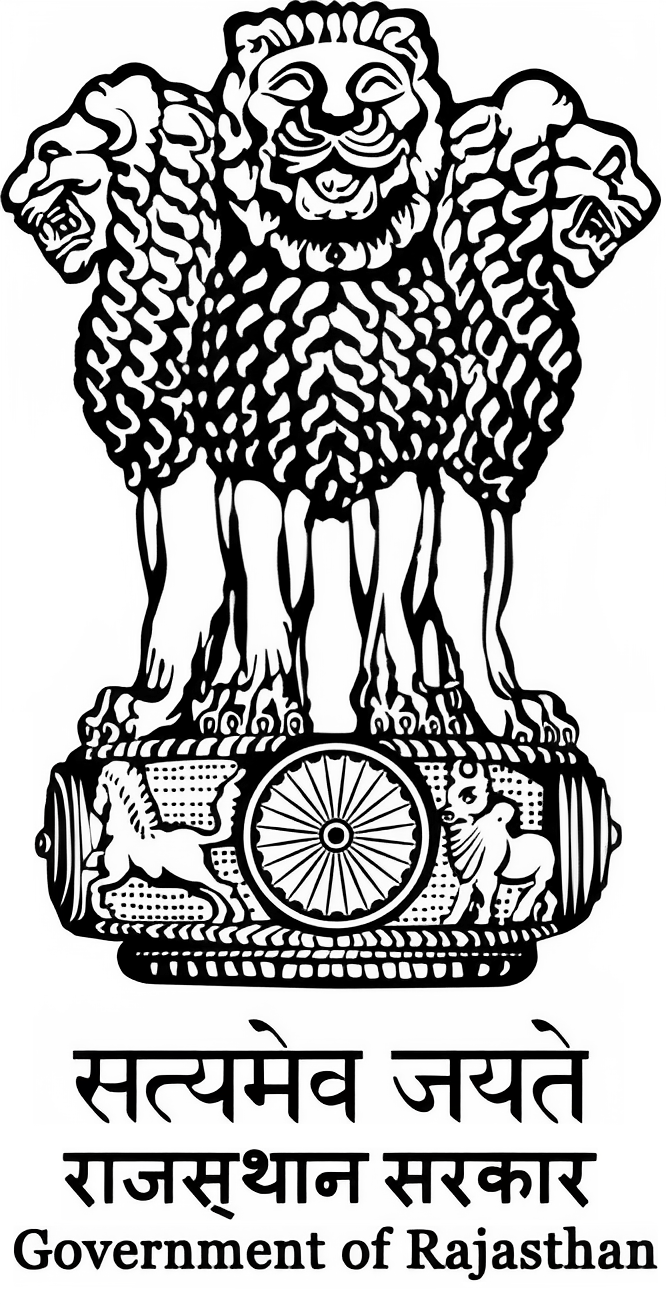
- Emblem of the State of Rajasthan

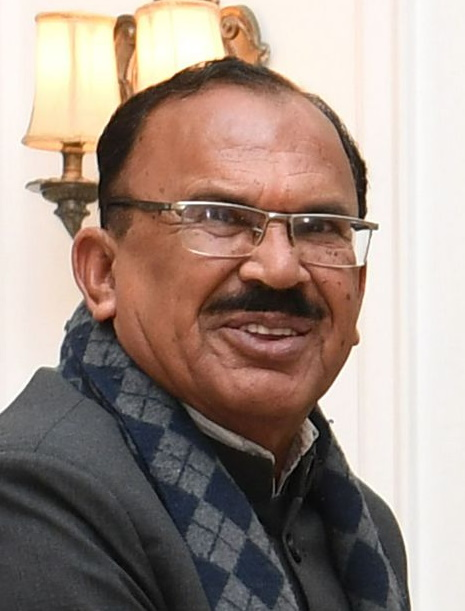
- Incumbent; Vasudev Devnani since 21 December 2023
- Rajasthan Legislative Assembly
- Style: The Honourable
- Member of: Rajasthan Legislative Assembly
- Appointer: Members of the Rajasthan Legislative Assembly
- Term length: During the life of the Assembly (five years maximum)
- Inaugural holder: Narottam Lal Joshi
- Formation: 31 March 1952
- Deputy: vacant

The speaker of the Rajasthan Legislative Assembly is the presiding officer of the Legislative Assembly of the state of Rajasthan, the main law-making body for the Indian state of Rajasthan. He is elected by the members of the Rajasthan Legislative Assembly. The speaker is always a member of the Legislative Assembly. Ram Niwas Mirdha is the longest serving speaker for a period of ten years while Sumitra Singh is the first women speaker of the Rajasthan Legislative Assembly.

== List of speakers of Rajasthan ==
#	Portrait	Name	Tenure			Assembly	Party
1		Narottam Lal Joshi	31 March 1952	25 April 1957	5 years, 25 days	1st	Indian National Congress
2		Ram Niwas Mirdha	25 April 1957	3 May 1967	10 years, 8 days	2nd	Indian National Congress
2		Ram Niwas Mirdha	25 April 1957	3 May 1967	10 years, 8 days	3rd	Indian National Congress
3		Niranjan Nath Acharya	3 May 1967	20 March 1972	4 years, 322 days	4th	Indian National Congress
4		Ram Kishore Vyas	20 March 1972	18 July 1977	5 years, 120 days	5th	Indian National Congress
5		Laxman Singh	18 July 1977	20 June 1979	1 year, 337 days	6th	Janata Party
6		Raja Gopal Singh	25 September 1979	7 July 1980	286 days	6th	Janata Party
7		Poonam Chand Vishnoi	7 July 1980	20 March 1985	4 years, 256 days	7th	Indian National Congress
8		Hira Lal Devpura	20 March 1985	16 October 1985	210 days	8th	Indian National Congress
9		Giriraj Prasad Tiwari	31 January 1986	11 March 1990	4 years, 39 days	8th	Indian National Congress
10		Hari Shankar Bhabhra	16 March 1990	21 December 1993	4 years, 203 days	9th	Bharatiya Janata Party
10		Hari Shankar Bhabhra	30 December 1993	5 October 1994	4 years, 203 days	10th	Bharatiya Janata Party
11		Shanti Lal Chaplot	7 April 1995	18 March 1998	2 years, 345 days	10th	Bharatiya Janata Party
12		Samrath Lal Meena	24 July 1998	4 January 1999	164 days	10th	Bharatiya Janata Party
13		Parasram Maderna	6 January 1999	15 January 2004	5 years, 9 days	11th	Indian National Congress
14		Sumitra Singh	16 January 2004	1 January 2009	4 years, 351 days	12th	Bharatiya Janata Party
15		Deependra Singh Shekhawat	2 January 2009	20 January 2014	5 years, 18 days	13th	Indian National Congress
16		Kailash Chandra Meghwal	22 January 2014	15 January 2019	4 years, 358 days	14th	Bharatiya Janata Party
17		C. P. Joshi	16 January 2019	20 December 2023	4 years, 338 days	15th	Indian National Congress
18		Vasudev Devnani	21 December 2023	Incumbent	2 years, 260 days	16th	Bharatiya Janata Party
