= NUA =

NUA or Nua may refer to:

== Universities ==
- Nagoya University of Arts, Kitanagoya, Japan
- Nanjing University of the Arts, Nanjing, China
- Norwich University of the Arts, Norwich, UK

== Sports ==
- Nelson United AFC, a New Zealand soccer club
- Ngaruawahia United AFC, an association football club based in Ngaruawahia, New Zealand
- North Up Alliance, a Dutch football tifosi group associated with AFC Ajax

== Places ==
- Nua (Rajasthan), a town in India
  - Nua railway station
- Nua, American Samoa, a village in Lealataua County, American Samoa

== Other uses ==
- National Unity Association, a Greek political party
- Nihon Ukulele Association, a Japanese association for ukulele players
- Yuanga language (ISO 639-3 code)
- Nua, a type of house in the vernacular architecture of Sumatra
- Nua, a 2004 album by Marta Roure
- "Nua", a 2003 song by Ana Carolina from Estampado

== See also ==
- Nanjing University of Aeronautics and Astronautics
