= Shankar Singh =

Shankar Singh may refer to:

- Shankar Singh (Bihar politician)
- Shankar Singh (Rajasthan politician)
