= Patusari =

Coordinates: 28.049561°N 75.454477°E

Patusari is a village situated southeast of the town of Jhunjhunu in Jhunjhunu district, Rajasthan, India.
