= Sharwan Kumar =

Indian politician

Member, Committee on Public Undertaking, Rajasthan Legislative Assembly
- Incumbent
- Assumed office 7 May 2024

Member of Rajasthan Legislative Assembly

Assembly Member for Surajgarh Assembly constituency
- Incumbent
- Assumed office 2023
- Preceded by: Subhash Poonia
- In office 2014–2018
- Preceded by: Santosh Ahlawat
- Succeeded by: Subhash Poonia
- In office 2008–2013
- Preceded by: Sunder Lal
- Succeeded by: Santosh Ahlawat

Assembly Member for Pilani Assembly constituency
- In office 2003–2008
- In office 1998–2003
- In office 1993–1998
- Preceded by: Sumitra Singh
- Succeeded by: Sunder Lal

Personal details
- Born: 2 October 1954 (age 71) Ghardu Ki Dhani, Jhunjhunu, Rajasthan, India
- Party: Indian National Congress
- Spouse: Sarti Devi (m. 1971)
- Children: 3
- Education: Secondary School

Sharwan Kumar (2 October 1947) is an Indian politician serving as member of Rajasthan Legislative Assembly. He has been elected as member of the Rajasthan Legislative Assembly for six-terms. He is a member of the Indian National Congress.

== Political career ==
He first fought assembly elections in 1993 from Pilani and won as an independent candidate and then he won 1998 and 2003 elections as a Congress candidate from Pilani constituency.

In the 2008 Legislative Assembly Elections, he changed his constituency from Pilani to Surajgarh due to the reservation of the Pilani seat. He again won from Surajgarh, beating Bhartiya Janta Party Candidate Santosh Ahlawat by a margin of nearly 8000 votes. He again fought MLA elections in 2013 but lost to BJP candidate Santosh Ahlawat with over 50,000 votes. Since Santosh Ahlawat became an MP, the Surajgarh assembly seat again went to poll on 13 September 2014.

In the 2014 Surajgarh By-poll, Kumar faced BJP heavyweight and former Minister, Dr. Digamber Singh, the former Health and industries Minister of Rajasthan, also a two time legislator, a popular leader of the state, who lost the 2013 Rajasthan Legislative Assembly election from the Deeg-Kumher Assembly constituency in Bharatpur district. Amidst storming of Chief Minister Vasundhara Raje, ministers of Government of Rajasthan and other prominent BJP leaders in Surajgarh, Digamber Singh’s victory was certain. The mainstream media, local outlets and the public conversation all predicted Singh’s triumph by over 20,000 plus votes. Vasundhara declared - “You ( voters of Surajgarh Assembly Constituency ) are electing a Cabinet Minister in the government and not an MLA”, referring to Digamber’s political status and the government’s intentions to induct him in the cabinet immediately after the polls.

However, as the results were declared, Kumar was able to pull off a stunner by defeating Singh with a narrow margin of 3270 votes. Kumar’s victory against Singh made national headlines and earned him fame in national politics. Digamber’s defeat was used by Congress leaders, Sachin Pilot, and, Ashok Gehlot, to lash out at ruling government and its inability to maintain public confidence.
