= Brijendra Singh Ola =

Indian politician (born 1953)

Member of Parliament, Lok Sabha
- Incumbent
- Assumed office 4 June 2024
- Preceded by: Narendra Kumar
- Constituency: Jhunjhunu

State Minister of Government of Rajasthan
- In office November 2011 – December 2013
- In office December 2009 – November 2011

State Minister Of Transport & Road Safety (IC) Government of Rajasthan
- In office November 2021 – 3 December 2023
- Preceded by: Pratap Singh Khachariawas
- Succeeded by: Prem Chand Bairwa

Member of Rajasthan Legislative Assembly
- In office 2008 – June 2024
- Preceded by: Sumitra Singh
- Succeeded by: Rajendra Bhamboo
- Constituency: Jhunjhunu

Personal details
- Born: 1 July 1953 (age 72) Aradavata, Jhunjhunu
- Party: Indian National Congress
- Parent: Sis Ram Ola (father)
- Education: M.A L.L.B
- Occupation: Politician

Brijendra Singh Ola (born 1 July 1953; Hindi pronunciation: [bɾɪd͡ʒeːn̪d̪ɾə sɪŋgʱ oːlaː]) is a senior leader from Jhunjhunu district in Rajasthan. He is serving as Member of Parliament, Lok Sabha for Jhunjhunu since 2024. He is elected as the member of Rajasthan Legislative Assembly from 2008 till 2024. He is former State Minister of Transport and Road Safety in the Government of Rajasthan. He is a fourth term former member of the Rajasthan Legislative Assembly from the Jhunjhunu Assembly constituency. He is a member of Indian National Congress.

== Early life and education ==
Ola was born on 1 July 1953 to Jat leader Sis Ram Ola in Aradavata village in Chirawa tehsil of Jhunjhunu district. His educational qualifications are M.A. in political science from University of Rajasthan in 1974 and then he did Bachelor of laws from University of Rajasthan in 1983.

== Political career ==
Ola began his political career as a member of the Indian National Congress, influenced by his father, the late Sis Ram Ola, a former Union Minister.

=== Rajasthan Legislative Assembly ===
He has been elected as a member of the Rajasthan Legislative Assembly from the Jhunjhunu constituency for consecutive four terms. His tenure in the assembly began in 2008, and he has since been re-elected in 2013, 2018 and 2023.

=== State Minister ===
Ola has served as the State Minister of Transport & Road Safety (Independent Charge) in the Government of Rajasthan. His term in this office started in November 2021 and ended on 3 December 2023.

=== Lok Sabha ===
In 2024 Lok Sabha elections Ola won the Jhunjhunu seat by defeating BJP's Shubkaran Chaudhary with a margin of 18235 votes.
