= Togra Sawroop Singh =

Togara Sawroop Singh
- village
- Country: India
- State: Rajasthan
- Founder: Swaroop singh

Government
  - Body: Gram panchayat

Languages
  - Official: Hindi
- Time zone: UTC+5:30 (IST)
- Postal code: 333707
- ISO 3166 code: RJ-IN
- Vehicle registration: RJ-18

Togra Sawroop Singh is a village located south of Jhunjhunu City in the state of Rajasthan, India, and around 21 kilometers from headquarters. It was developed by Sawroop Singh around 100 years ago when a nearby village caught fire.
