= Hansalsar =

- Village
- Location within Rajasthan Location within India
- Coordinates: 28.04051°N 75.52727°E
- Country: India
- State: Rajasthan
- District: Jhunjhunu
- Language: Shekhawati and Hindi

Area
  - Total: 12.06 km^{2} (4.66 sq mi)
- Elevation: 386 m (1,266 ft)

Population (2011)
  - Total: 3,307
  - Density: 274.2/km^{2} (710.2/sq mi)
- Time zone: UTC+5:30 (IST)
- PIN: 333021
- Telephone code: 01594
- Vehicle registration: RJ18
- Lok Sabha Constituency: Jhunjhunu

Hansalsar is a small village near the city of Jhunjhunu situated on the banks of Katli river in the Jhunjhunu district of Rajasthan, India.

== Notable people ==
- Kuldeep Kayath, Singer
