= 86th Armoured Regiment (India) =

Indian Army regiment

- Active: 1977– present
- Country: India
- Allegiance: India
- Branch: Indian Army
- Type: Armour
- Size: Regiment
- Nickname: Chhiassi
- Mottos: निश्चय कर अपनी जीत करौं Nischay Kar Apni Jeet Karoon (And with determination, I will be Victorious)
- Equipment: T-90

Commanders
- Colonel of the Regiment: Lieutenant General Mohit Malhotra
- Notable commanders: Lt Gen NS Malik, Lt Gen Kamal Davar

Insignia
- Abbreviation: 86 Armd Regt

86 Armoured Regiment is an armoured regiment of the Indian Army.

== Formation ==
The regiment was raised on 1 March 1977 by Lt Col N.S. Malik (later Lt Gen) at Ahmednagar as an all India mixed-class regiment and was equipped with T-55 tanks.

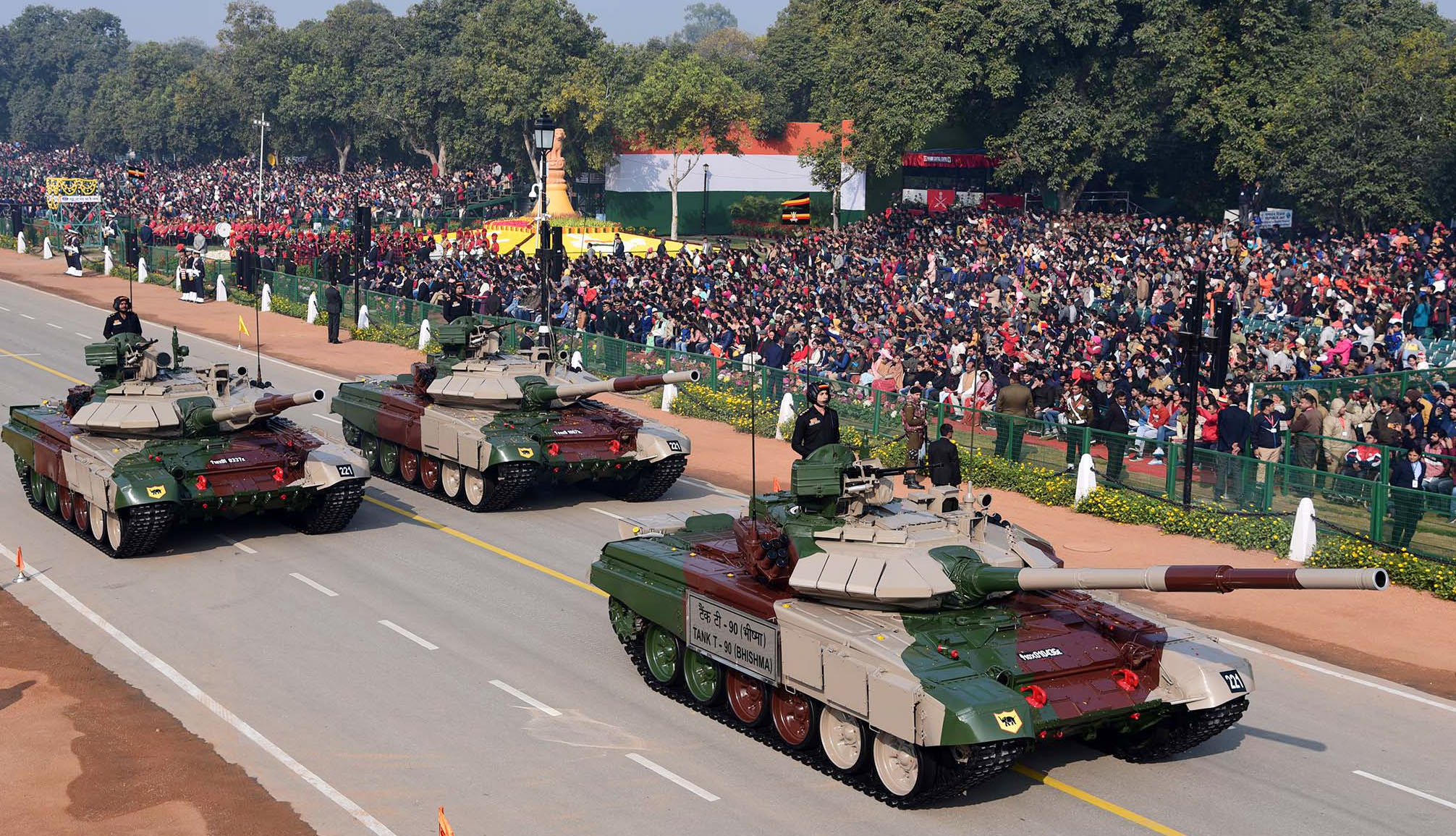
T- 90 of the 86th Armoured Regiment passes through the Rajpath during the Republic Day Parade, 2020

== History ==
The regiment was involved in Operation Blue Star from 6 August to 9 September 1984. It later participated in Operation Trident, Operation Vijay and Operation Parakram. It has also participated in counter-infiltration and counter-terrorist operations.

The Regiment was presented the ‘President’s Standards’ at Mamun Cantonment near Pathankot on 1 December 2003 by the President of India, Mr A. P. J. Abdul Kalam.

The Regiment had the honour of participating in the Republic Day parade in 2020.

== Equipment ==
The regiment was raised with T-55 tanks and subsequently converted to T-90 tanks.

== Notable personnel ==
- Lt Gen N.S. Malik : First Commandant and later Deputy Chief of Army Staff
- Lt Gen Kamal Davar : The third Commandant, GOC of 3 Infantry Division, GOC of the XI Corps, Director-General, Mechanised Forces, the first chief of Defence Intelligence Agency.
- Maj Gen RS Malve : He was the Commandant when the regiment received the President's Standards in 2003.
- Risaldar Major Mohd. Ayub Khan, Vir Chakra (Honorary Captain) : Formerly of the 18th Cavalry, he was the first Risaldar Major of the Regiment. He rose to be a Minister of State in Prime Minister P. V. Narasimha Rao's government.

== Regimental Insignia ==
The regiment initially had a cap badge consisting of crossed lances with pennons, the Ashoka Lion Capital above and the numeral "86" inscribed on the crossing of the lances. It was amended in 1990 and the Lion Capital was replaced with the "mailed fist" or gauntlet. A scroll was added at the base with the regimental motto inscribed in Devanagari script on it.

The motto of the regiment is 'निश्चय कर अपनी जीत करौं' (Nischay Kar Apni Jeet Karoon) which translates to And with determination, I will be Victorious.

The shoulder title consists of the numeral "86" in brass.
