= Jitendra Singh (Rajasthan politician) =

Member of Legislative Assembly

Member of the Rajasthan Legislative Assembly
- In office 1985-1990, 1993-2003, 2008-2013, 2018 – 2023
- Preceded by: Pooranmal Saini
- Constituency: Khetri

Personal details
- Born: 11 December 1946 (age 79) Khetri, Jhunjhunu
- Party: Indian National Congress
- Spouse: Vinakshi Singh

Jitendra Singh is an Indian politician. He is a senior member of Indian National Congress. He served as Member of Rajasthan Legislative Assembly for five-terms representing Khetri constituency.

== Early life and education ==
He was born on 11 December 1946 in Khetri, Jhunjhunu to Choggalal and Pan Kumari. He did MBBS from SMS Medical College, Jaipur.

== Personal life ==
In 1968, Singh married Vinakshi Singh; they have 2 children.
