= Giriraj Prasad Tiwari =

Indian politician (1920–2025)

9th Speaker of the Rajasthan Legislative Assembly
- In office 31 January 1986 – 11 March 1990
- Governor: Vasantdada Patil; Sukhdev Prasad; D. P. Chattopadhyaya
- Preceded by: Hira Lal Devpura
- Succeeded by: Hari Shankar Bhabhra
- Constituency: Bayana, Rajasthan

Personal details
- Born: 20 December 1920 Bayana, Bharatpur State, British Raj
- Died: 2 October 2025 (aged 104) Bharatpur, Rajasthan, India
- Party: Indian National Congress
- Occupation: Politician

Giriraj Prasad Tiwari (Hindi: गिरिराज प्रसाद तिवारी; 20 December 1920 – 2 October 2025) was an Indian politician.

== Life and career ==
Tiwari was born on 20 December 1920, in Bidyari village of Bayana sub division in the Bharatpur district. He served as speaker of the Rajasthan Legislative Assembly from 1986 to 1990.

Tiwari died on 2 October 2025, at the age of 104.
