= Ram Niwas Mirdha =

Indian politician

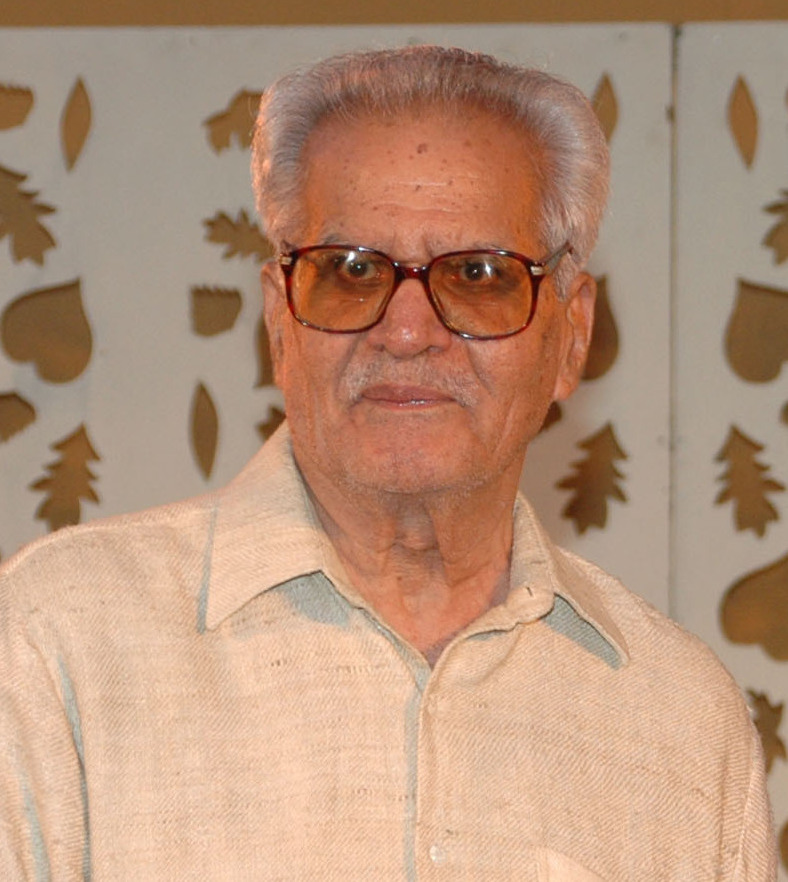
- Mirdha in 2007

Deputy Chairperson of the Rajya Sabha
- In office 30 March 1977 – 2 April 1980
- Chairman: B. D. Jatti; Mohammed Hidtabullah
- Preceded by: Godey Murahari
- Succeeded by: Shyam Lal Yadav

Speaker of the Rajasthan Legislative Assembly
- In office 25 April 1957 – 3 May 1967
- Preceded by: Narottam Lal Joshi
- Succeeded by: Niranjan Nath Acharya

Minister of State for Home Affairs
- In office 27 June 1970 – 18 March 1971
- Preceded by: Vidya Charan Shukla
- Succeeded by: K. C. Pant

Minister of State for Defence
- In office 10 October 1974 – 21 December 1975
- Preceded by: Vidya Charan Shukla
- Succeeded by: Vitthalrao Gadgil

Union Minister of Communications
- In office 31 December 1984 – 22 October 1986
- Preceded by: Rajiv Gandhi
- Succeeded by: Arjun Singh

Union Minister of Textiles
- In office 22 October 1986 – 2 December 1989
- Preceded by: Khurshed Alam Khan
- Succeeded by: Sharad Yadav

Union Minister of Health
- In office 24 January 1989 – 4 July 1989
- Preceded by: Motilal Vora
- Succeeded by: Rafique Alam

Union Minister of Irrigation
- In office 29 January 1983 – 2 August 1984
- Preceded by: Kedar Pandey
- Succeeded by: Prakash Chandra Sethi

Member of Parliament, Lok Sabha
- In office 1984 – 1989
- Constituency: Nagaur, Rajasthan
- In office 1991 – 1996
- Constituency: Barmer, Rajasthan

Member of Parliament, Rajya Sabha
- In office 1967 – 1984
- Constituency: Rajasthan

Member of the Rajasthan Legislative Assembly
- In office 1953 – 1967

Personal details
- Born: 24 August 1924 Kuchera, Rajputana, British Raj
- Died: 29 January 2010 (aged 85) Delhi, India
- Party: Indian National Congress
- Spouse: Indira Mirdha
- Children: Harendra Mirdha
- Education: University of Allahabad; University of Lucknow; Geneva Graduate Institute
- Nickname: Padha Likha Jat

Ram Niwas Mirdha (24 August 1924 – 29 January 2010) was an Indian statesman, parliamentarian, and cultural administrator in post-independence India. A veteran member of the Indian National Congress, Mirdha holds the record for being longest serving speaker of the Rajasthan Assembly, from 1957 to 1967. Mirdha later elected to the Rajya Sabha and served several positions including Deputy Chairperson of the Rajya Sabha, from 1977 to 1980. At the Union level, he served as Minister of State for Home Affairs and Defence, while Cabinet Minister for Communications, Textiles, Health, and Water Resources, during the 1970s and 1980s. Mirdha was popularly nicknamed “Padha Likha Jat”, the educated Jat, because of his distinguished academic background than the contemporary Rajasthani politicians, having studied at Allahabad University and later at the Geneva Graduate Institute.

In addition to his political career, Mirdha held leadership positions in several cultural and academic institutions. He served as chairman of the Sangeet Natak Akademi, Lalit Kala Akademi, and the National Institute of Sports, and was associated with organizations such as the Indian Heritage Society and the Youth Hostels Association of India. Internationally, he represented India at the United Nations and UNESCO, and was a member of the UNESCO Executive Board from 1993 to 1997.

== Early life and education ==
Ram Niwas Mirdha was born on 24 August 1924 in Kuchera, Nagaur district, Rajasthan into a Jat family. His father, Baldeo Ram Mirdha, was a police officer and a social reformer. Growing up in the 1930s and 1940s, Mirdha was influenced by the Indian independence movement, and as a student he participated in nationalist activities that exposed him to political life at an early age.

He studied at Allahabad University, where he completed a Master of Arts degree, and later did a Bachelor of Laws (L.L.B.) from Lucknow University. During his university years he was active in student politics and debates, often engaging with issues of social reform and national independence. These experiences strengthened his interest in public life and his association with the Congress-led freedom struggle.

Mirdha continued his academic training abroad at the Graduate Institute of International Studies, Geneva, focusing on international affairs. On his return to India, he joined the Rajasthan Administrative Service (RAS), but in 1953 he resigned from government service in order to enter active politics.

== Political career ==
Mirdha entered active politics in 1953 after resigning from the Rajasthan Administrative Service. He was elected in a by-election from the Jayal constituency of Nagaur district to the Rajasthan Legislative Assembly the same year. He was re-elected in 1957 and 1962, and from 1957 to 1967 he served as the Speaker of the Rajasthan Legislative Assembly, becoming its longest-serving presiding speaker to date. During this period, he also handled ministerial responsibilities in the Government of Rajasthan, including portfolios such as Agriculture, Irrigation, and Transport.

In 1967, Mirdha was elected to the Rajya Sabha, where he served for multiple terms until 1984. In 1973, following the death of Chief Minister Barkatullah Khan, Mirdha was considered a leading contender for the chief ministership of Rajasthan and reportedly enjoyed the backing of Prime Minister Indira Gandhi. However, he lost the Congress Legislature Party vote to Hari Dev Joshi, which prevented him from becoming the first Jat chief minister of Rajasthan.

He held several responsibilities in the upper house, including Deputy Chairman of the Rajya Sabha from 1977 to 1980. During this tenure in the Rajya Sabha, he was appointed Minister of State in various departments under Prime Minister Indira Gandhi, including Home Affairs, Defence, and Personnel, Public Grievances and Pensions during the 1970s.

In 1983, Mirdha was elevated to the Union Cabinet as Minister of Irrigation. Following the general election of 1984, he was elected to the Lok Sabha from Nagaur, defeating his uncle Nathu Ram Mirdha. In the Rajiv Gandhi ministry, he served as Minister of State for External Affairs (1984), Cabinet Minister for Communications (1985–1986), Textiles (1986-1989), Health (1989), and Water Resources (1987-1988).

After a brief electoral setback, Mirdha returned to the Lok Sabha in 1991, representing the Barmer constituency in the 10th Lok Sabha (1991–1996). During this period, he chaired several parliamentary committees, including the Joint Parliamentary Committee (JPC).

=== Joint Parliamentary Committees ===
Mirdha played a role in parliamentary committee work, most notably as Chairman of the Joint Parliamentary Committee (JPC) on Irregularities in Securities and Banking Transactions (1992–93), which was constituted following the 1992 Harshad Mehta securities scam. The committee examined irregularities in banking operations and the securities market, the involvement of brokers and financial institutions, and regulatory lapses that allowed the scam to occur.

Mirdha served as a member of the Joint Parliamentary Committee investigating the Bofors defence deal, chaired by B. Shankaranand. Along with other Congress members, he supported the committee’s final report, which cleared the Rajiv Gandhi government of wrongdoing, though the report was strongly opposed by the Opposition through dissenting notes.

== Public image ==
Mirdha was an Indian statesman, parliamentarian, and cultural administrator in post-independence India. Often described as a “Padha Likha Jat”, an educated Jat, he embodied the intellectual aspirations of his community while maintaining a pan-Indian stature.

He was admired for his cultured upbringing and refined tastes in literature, music, and art, which distinguished him from the archetypal image of a grassroots politician. He served Chairman of the Sangeet Natak Akademi and the National Institute of Sports.

During the 1980s, when Nobel laureate V. S. Naipaul visited India, he met Mirdha and was struck by the minister’s ability to quote from his works with remarkable ease. Deeply impressed, Naipaul later remarked, “What is a civilised man like Mirdha doing in politics ?

=== Perception in the Media ===
The Times of India described him as “a politician with a clean image,” highlighting his style of serving the public over adopting a bureaucratic lifestyle. Times Now referred to him as “a gentleman farmer,” in recognition of his humble demeanour and agricultural roots.

== Cultural activities ==
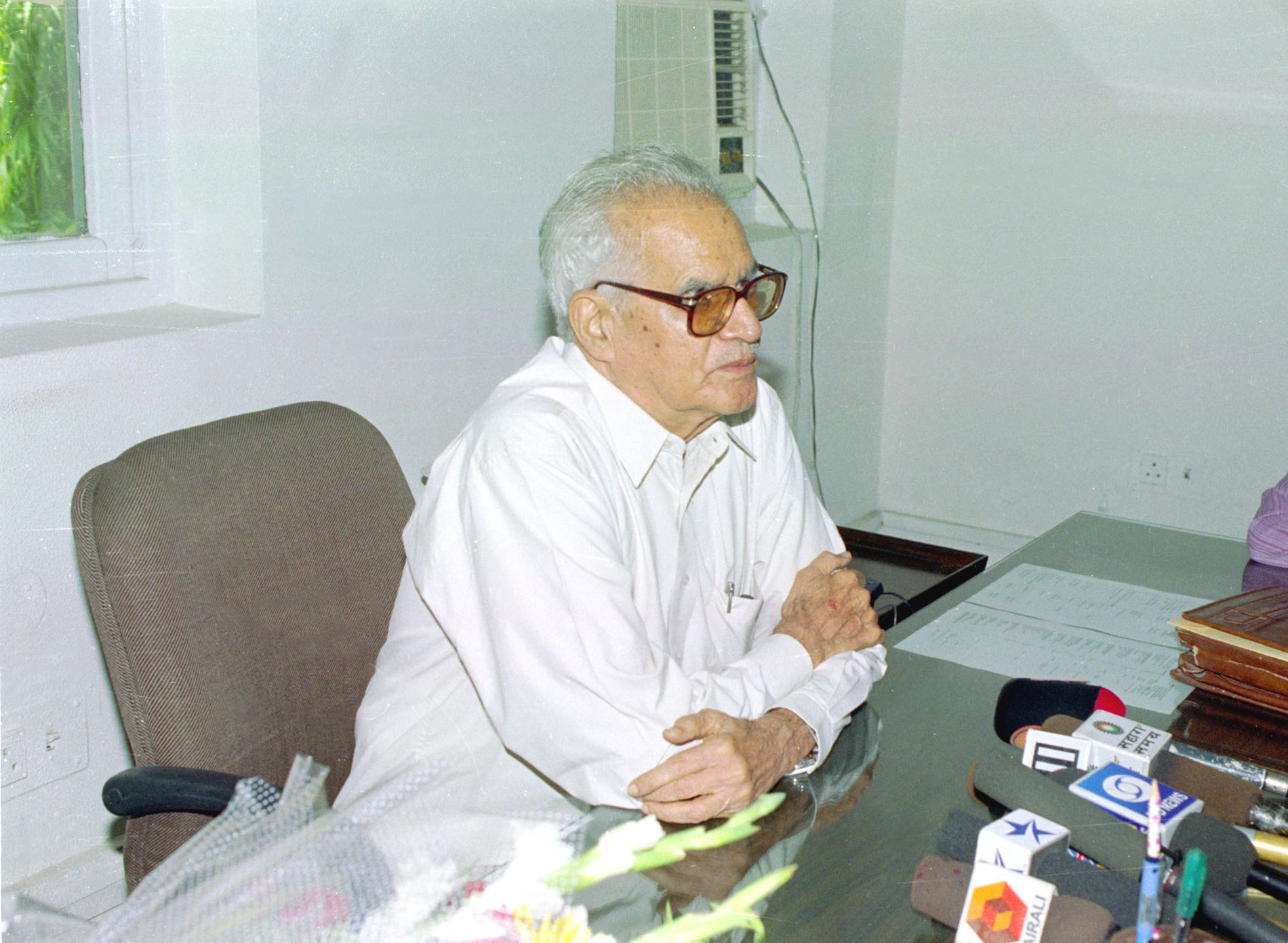
Mirdha assumes the charge of the Chairman, Sangeet Natak Akademi in New Delhi in 2005

Mirdha took an important role in promoting Indian arts, culture and youth activities. From 2005 until his death he was Chairman of the Sangeet Natak Akademi (India’s National Academy of Music, Dance & Drama). In that capacity he oversaw national programs to support performing arts and instituted the Ustad Bismillah Khan Yuva Puraskar awards for young artists. Earlier, he had served as Chairman of the Lalit Kala Akademi (National Academy of Fine Arts) and as head of the National Institute of Sports. He was President of the Indian Heritage Society and the Youth Hostels Association of India, and served on the Delhi Urban Arts Commission. He also played roles in sports and youth development, such as leading the organising committee for the 1982 Asian Games in New Delhi.

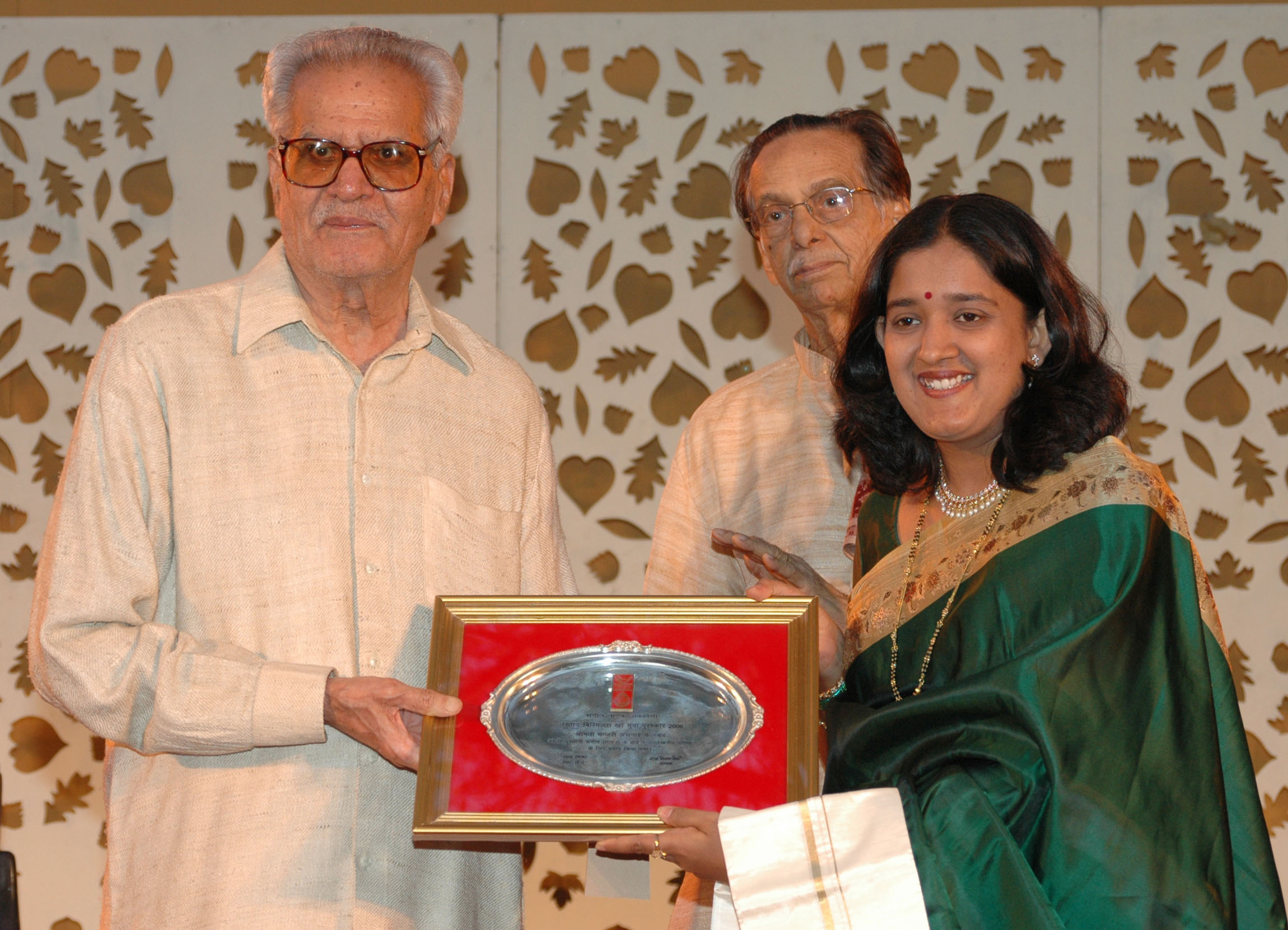
Mirdha presenting the Ustad Bismillah Khan Yuva Puraskar to Manjiri Asanare–Kelkar

== Death ==
Mirdha was admitted in a private hospital in New Delhi on 21 January 2010, following kidney infection. He died on 29 January 2010, at the age of 86, due to multi organ failure. His last rites were performed with full state honours.

Previously, Prime Minister Manmohan Singh and Congress president Sonia Gandhi visited him in the hospital.

== See also ==
- Baldev Ram Mirdha
- Nathuram Mirdha
