= Mohd. Ayub Khan =

Indian politician and soldier

Captain Mohammad Ayub Khan VrC
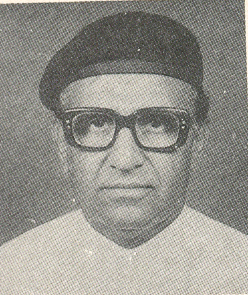
- Born: 1932; Nua village, Khetri Thikana, Jaipur State, British Raj
- Died: 15 September 2016 (aged 83–84); Nua, Jhunjhunu district, Rajasthan, India
- Military career
- Allegiance: India
- Branch: Indian Army
- Service years: 23th June 1950–31 December 1983
- Rank: Honorary Captain Risaldar Major
- Service number: JC-32607
- Units: 18 Cavalry; 86 Armoured Regiment
- Conflicts: Indo-Pakistani War of 1965; Battle of Phillora
- Awards: Vir Chakra
- Other work: Member of Parliament, Union Minister

Risaldar-major (Hon. Captain) Mohammed Ayub Khan VrC (1932 – 15 September 2016) was a decorated Indian Army soldier and a minister in the Government of India headed by P. V. Narasimha Rao.

== Early life ==
He was born in 1932 in Nua village of Jhunjhunu district in Rajasthan.

== Career in the Indian Army ==
Like his father Iman Ali Khan and many from his district, he served in Indian Army. He joined the 18th Cavalry regiment of the Armoured Corps in 1950, attaining the rank of Daffadar (Cavalry Sergeant) by 1965. On 1 January 1965, he was promoted to Jemadar, subsequently redesignated Naib Risaldar. As a Naib Risaldar, he was honoured with the Vir Chakra for his gallantry in the Sialkot sector during the Indo-Pakistani War of 1965.

Khan was promoted Risaldar on 22 July 1970 and to Risaldar Major on 1 February 1978, by which time he was serving with the newly formed 86 Armoured Regiment. He was made an Honorary Captain at the time of his retirement.

== Political career ==
After retirement, he joined the Indian National Congress and won the Lok Sabha election from Jhunjhunu to become a Member of Parliament of the 8th Lok Sabha in 1984. During this tenure, he was a Member of the Public Accounts Committee and of the Consultative Committee in the Ministry of Defence. In his home state, he was the General Secretary of the Pradesh Congress Committee, a Member of the Coordination Committee, State Government and Congress Party, Rajasthan.

He was elected for a second tenure in 1991 for the 10th Lok Sabha. He served as Union minister of State for agriculture in the P. V. Narasimha Rao government from 15 September 1995 to 16 May 1996.

Khan died on 15 September 2016 at the age of 84 years in his village Nua. On 15 September 2019, a gate was inaugurated in the name of Ayub Khan in his native village.

== Awards and decorations ==

Vir Chakra
Samar Seva Star	Paschimi Star	Raksha Medal	Sangram Medal
Sainya Seva Medal	25th Independence Anniversary Medal	9 Years Long Service Medal	20 Years Long Medal
