= Surajgarh Assembly constituency =

Constituency of the Rajasthan legislative assembly in India

Coordinates: 28.31°N 75.73°E

Surajgarh
- Constituency No. 26 for the Rajasthan Legislative Assembly

Constituency details
- Country: India
- Region: North India
- State: Rajasthan
- District: Jhunjhunu district
- Established: 1962
- Reservation: None

Member of Legislative Assembly
- 16th Rajasthan Legislative Assembly
- Incumbent Sharwan Kumar
- Party: Indian National Congress
- Elected year: 2023

Surajgarh Assembly constituency is one of constituencies of Rajasthan Legislative Assembly in the Jhunjhunu Lok Sabha constituency.

Surajgarh constituency covers all voters from Buhana tehsil and parts of Chirawa, which include Surajgarh Municipal Board, Badbar Baloda, Berla, Bhaothari, Dheengariya, Jakhod, Kakoda, Kidwana, Lakhoo, Lotiya and Mahpalwas of ILRC Surajgarh.

== Members of the Legislative Assembly ==
Year	Name	Party	Ref.
1962	Shiv Narain Chhachhia	Swatantra Party	
1967	Surajmal	Swatantra Party	
1972	Sunder Lal	Indian National Congress	
1977	Subhash Chand Arya	Janata Party	
1980	Sunder Lal	Independent	
1985	Sunder Lal	Indian National Congress	
1990	Babu Lal Khanda	Janata Dal	
1993	Sunder Lal	Independent	
1998	Hanuman Prasad	Indian National Congress	
2003	Sunder Lal	Bharatiya Janata Party	
2008	Sharwan Kumar	Indian National Congress	
2013	Santosh Ahlawat	Bharatiya Janata Party	
2014	Sharwan Kumar	Indian National Congress	
2018	Subhash Poonia	Bharatiya Janata Party	
2023	Sharwan Kumar	Indian National Congress	

2014: By-election due to resignation of Mrs. Santosh Ahlawat after being elected to Lok Sabha.

== Results ==
=== 2023 ===
2023 Rajasthan Legislative Assembly election: Surajgarh
Party	Candidate	Votes	%	±%
INC	Sharwan Kumar S/O Gokal Ram	115,684	57.74	18.25
BJP	Santosh Ahalawat	78270	39.07	−2.19
NOTA	None of the Above	1024	0.51	0.31
Majority		37414	18.67	16.9
Turnout		200348	68.74	−3.27

=== 2018 ===
2018 Rajasthan Legislative Assembly election: Surajgarh
Party	Candidate	Votes	%	±%
BJP	Subhash Poonia S/O Lokram Poonia	79,913	41.26	
INC	Sharwan Kumar S/O Gokal Ram	76488	39.49	
BSP	Karmveer Yadav	30948	15.98	
NOTA	None of the Above	392	0.2	
Majority		3425	1.77	
Turnout		193681	72.01	

== See also ==
- Member of the Legislative Assembly (India)
