= Dharmpal Gurjar =

Indian politician

Member of Rajasthan Legislative Assembly
- Incumbent
- Assumed office 3 December 2023
- Preceded by: Jitendra Singh
- Constituency: Khetri

Personal details
- Party: Bhartiya Janta Party
- Occupation: Politician

Dharmpal Gurjar is an Indian politician. He is serving as member of Rajasthan Legislative Assembly representing Khetri constituency since 2023. He is a member of the Bhartiya Janata Party.

== Political career ==
In 2023 Rajasthan Legislative Assembly election, he was elected as an MLA from the Khetri Assembly constituency, defeating Manoj Ghumaria, the candidate from the Bahujan Samaj Party (BSP), by a margin of 70,597 votes.
