= J.P. Chandelia =

Indian politician

Member of the Rajasthan Legislative Assembly
- In office 2018–2023
- Preceded by: Sunder Lal
- Constituency: Pilani

Personal details
- Party: Indian National Congress
- Occupation: Advocate
- Profession: Politician

J.P. Chandelia is an Indian politician. He was elected to the 15th Rajasthan Legislative Assembly from Pilani. He is a member of the Indian National Congress. He defeated Kailash Chand by 13,539 votes.
