= Vikram Singh Jakhal =

Indian politician

Member of the Rajasthan Legislative Assembly
- Incumbent
- Assumed office 2023
- Preceded by: Rajkumar Sharma
- Constituency: Nawalgarh

Personal details
- Party: Bhartiya Janta Party
- Occupation: Politician

Vikram Singh Jakhal is an Indian politician who serves as a member of Rajasthan Legislative Assembly, representing the Nawalgarh Assembly constituency as a member of the Bhartiya Janta Party.

Following the 2023 Rajasthan Legislative Assembly election, he was elected as an MLA from the Nawalgarh Assembly constituency, defeating Rajkumar Sharma, the candidate from the Indian National Congress (INC), by a margin of 23,180 votes.
