= Narendra Kumar (politician) =

Indian politician

Member of Parliament
- In office 23 May 2019 – 4 June 2024
- Preceded by: Santosh Ahlawat
- Succeeded by: Brijendra Singh Ola
- Constituency: Jhunjhunu

Member of legislative assembly
- In office 2013 to 2019
- Preceded by: Rita Choudhary
- Succeeded by: Rita Choudhary
- Constituency: Mandawa

Personal details
- Born: 29 June 1960 (age 66)
- Party: Bharatiya Janata Party

Narendra Kumar Khichar is an Indian politician and the former Member of Parliament from Jhunjhunu parliamentary constituency.

== Early life and education ==
Kumar was born in Rajasthan 1960, he studied at Chamaria College Fatehpur, Rajasthan University-1982.
