= Nawalgarh Assembly constituency =

Constituency of the Rajasthan legislative assembly in India

Coordinates: 27.85°N 75.27°E

Nawalgarh
- Constituency No. 29 for the Rajasthan Legislative Assembly

Constituency details
- Country: India
- Region: North India
- State: Rajasthan
- District: Jhunjhunu district
- Established: 1951
- Reservation: None

Member of Legislative Assembly
- 16th Rajasthan Legislative Assembly
- Incumbent Vikram Singh Jakhal
- Party: Bharatiya Janata Party
- Elected year: 2023

Nawalgarh Assembly constituency is one of constituencies of Rajasthan Legislative Assembly in the Jhunjhunu Lok Sabha constituency.

Nawalgarh constituency covers all voters from Nawalgarh tehsil.

== Members of the Legislative Assembly ==
Year	Member	Party
1951	Bhim Singh	Akhil Bharatiya Ram Rajya Parishad
1957	Shri Ram Basotia	Independent
1962	Bhim Singh	Indian National Congress
1967	Sanwar Mal Basotia	Swatantra Party
1972	Bhanwar Singh	Indian National Congress
1977	Navrang Singh	Janata Party
1980	Bhanwar Singh	Indian National Congress
1985	Navrang Singh	Lok Dal
1990	Bhanwar Singh	Independent
1993	Bhanwar Singh	Indian National Congress
1998	Bhanwar Singh	Indian National Congress
2003	Pratibha Singh	Independent
2008	Dr Rajkumar Sharma	Bahujan Samaj Party
2013	Dr Rajkumar Sharma	Independent
2018	Dr Rajkumar Sharma	Indian National Congress
2023	Vikram Singh Jakhal	Bharatiya Janata Party

== Election results ==
=== 2023 ===
2023 Rajasthan Legislative Assembly election: Nawalgarh
Party	Candidate	Votes	%	±%
BJP	Vikram Singh Jakhal	112,037	53.96	+30.85
INC	Rajkumar Sharma	88,857	42.8	+0.11
NOTA	None of the above	1,352	0.65	−0.14
Majority		23,180	11.16	−8.42
Turnout		207,626	73.99	+2.27
BJP gain from INC		Swing		

=== 2018 ===
2018 Rajasthan Legislative Assembly election: Nawalgarh
Party	Candidate	Votes	%	±%
INC	Dr Rajkumar Sharma	79,570	42.69	
BJP	Ravi Saini	43,070	23.11	
Independent	Vikram Singh Jakhal	39,259	21.06	
RLP	Pratibha Singh	9,610	5.16	
BSP	Ram Avtar Narnolia	5,382	2.89	
Independent	Sanjay Basotia	1,761	0.94	
NOTA	None of the above	1,475	0.79	
Majority		36,500	19.58	
Turnout		186,377	71.72	
INC gain from		Swing		

== See also ==
- Member of the Legislative Assembly (India)
