= Nua railway station =

Railway station in Rajasthan, India

Nua

General information
- Location: Nua, Jhunjhunu district, Rajasthan; India
- Coordinates: 28.058249°N 75.285473°E
- System: Indian Railways station
- Owner: Indian Railways
- Operator: North Western Railway
- Line: Sikar–Loharu line
- Platforms: 1
- Tracks: 1

Construction
- Structure type: Standard (on ground station)
- Parking: Yes

Other information
- Status: Single diesel line
- Station code: NUA
- Zone(s): North Western Railway
- Division(s): Jaipur
Location
- Location within India Location within Rajasthan

Nua railway station is a railway station in Jhunjhunu district, Rajasthan. Its code is NUA. It serves Nua town. The station consists of a single platform. Passenger, Express trains halt here.

== Trains ==
The following trains halt at Nua railway station in both directions:

- Delhi Sarai Rohilla–Sikar Express
