= Ganeshwar =

Village in Rajasthan or Archeological site, India

- village
- Location in Rajasthan, India Ganeshwar (India)
- Coordinates: 27.632732°N 75.879359°E
- Country: India
- State: Rajasthan
- District: Sikar

Government
  - Body: Gram panchayat
  - Sarpanch: Saroj Devi
- Elevation: 424.24 m (1,391.9 ft)

Population (2011)
  - Total: 6,994

Languages
  - Official: Hindi
- Time zone: UTC+5:30 (IST)
- PIN: 332705
- Telephone code: 91-1574
- ISO 3166 code: RJ-IN
- Vehicle registration: RJ-23
- Nearest city: Neem-Ka-Thana
- Distance from Neem-Ka-Thana: 7.9 kilometres (4.9 mi) (land)
- Distance from Sikar: 66.4 kilometres (41.3 mi) (land)
- Distance from Jaipur: 83 kilometres (52 mi) (land)
- Avg. summer temperature: 46–48 °C
- Avg. winter temperature: 0–1 °C

Ganeshwar is a village in Sikar district of the Indian state of Rajasthan. Ganeshwar is 7.9 kilometres (4.9 mi) distance from Neem-Ka- Thana District, 66.4 kilometres (41.3 mi) from Sikar city and 83 kilometres (52 mi) from Jaipur. Excavations in the area revealed the remains of a 4,000-year-old civilization.

== History ==
Ganeshwar is located near the copper mines of the Sikar-Jhunjhunu area of the Khetri copper belt in Rajasthan. The Ganeshwar-Jodhpura culture has over 80 other sites currently identified. The period was estimated to be 2500–2000 BC. Historian Ratna Chandra Agrawala wrote that Ganeshwar was excavated in 1977. Excavations revealed copper objects including arrowheads, spearheads, fish hooks, bangles and chisels. With its microliths and other stone tools, Ganeshwar culture can be ascribed to the pre-Harappan period. Ganeshwar saw three cultural phases: Period 1 (3800 BCE) which was characterized by hunting and gathering communities using chert tools; Period II (2800 BCE) shows the beginnings of metal work in copper and fired clay pottery; Period III (2000 BCE) featured a variety of pottery and copper goods being produced. Painted Grey Ware and Iron was also found in Period III Nearly one thousand pieces of copper were found here. Red pottery was found here with black portraiture. Ganeshwar mainly supplied copper objects to Harappa.The Ganeshwar people partly lived on agriculture and largely on hunting. Although their principle craft was manufacture of copper objects but they were unable to urbanize. With its microliths and other stone tools, much of Ganeshwar culture can be considered a pre-Harappan Chalcolithic culture that contributed to the making of the mature Harappan culture. The copper was obtained in the nearby Aravalli Range.
