= Ked, Rajasthan =

Ked
- Village
- Location in Rajasthan, India Ked (India)
- Coordinates: 27.72885°N 75.47156°E
- Country: India
- State: Rajasthan
- District: Jhunjhunun
- Tehsil: Udaipurwati
- Post Office: Titanwar
- Established: 1439

Languages
  - Official: Hindi, Marwari, Rajasthani
- Time zone: UTC+5:30 (IST)
- PIN: 333 012

Ked, is a village located in Jhunjhunu district Rajasthan situated on the banks of Katli river. this region is also known as Gaurati the land of Gaurs.
