= Raja Gopal Singh =

Indian politician (died 2010)

Governor of Arunachal Pradesh
- In office 16 Marach 1990 – 8 May 1990

Speaker of Rajasthan Legislative Assembly
- In office 1979–1980
- Preceded by: Laxman Singh
- Succeeded by: Poonam Chand Vishnoi

Personal details
- Died: 21 December 2010
- Party: Janata Party

Raja Gopal Singh (died 21 December 2010) was an Indian politician who was Speaker of Rajasthan Legislative Assembly. He served as speaker in Janata Party rule from 25 September 1979 to 7 July 1980. Gopal Singh belonged to Rajput erstwhile Raja family of Bhadrajun thikana. He used to look after affairs of family heritage hotel (a fort converted hotel).

He was MLA from Ahore in the Jalore district twice in 1977 and 1990.

Singh, who had been a Raja under the former Jodhpur State, represented Ahore Assembly constituency in Jalore district of the State twice.

Known as a gentleman politician, he was a much respected figure in western Rajasthan.

Not a person who hankered after power and position, he devoted more time in the past decade to conservation of water bodies and building of check dams in Jodhpur, Jalore and Pali districts than in politics.

He was one of the founder members of the water conservation NGO, Jal Bhagirathi Foundation.

Government offices
Preceded by R. D. Pradhan	Governor of Arunachal Pradesh; 17 March 1990 – 8 May 1990	Succeeded by Devi Das Thakur

== Sources ==
- Rajasthan Assembly
