= Narottam Lal Joshi =

1st Speaker of the Rajasthan Legislative Assembly
- In office 31 March 1952 – 25 April 1957
- Governor: Man Singh II; Gurumukh Nihal Singh
- Preceded by: office established
- Succeeded by: Ram Niwas Mirdha
- Constituency: Nathdwara, Rajasthan

Personal details
- Born: 16 December 1914 Jhunjhunu, Rajasthan, British Raj
- Died: 3 December 1994 (aged 79) Jaipur, Rajasthan, India
- Party: Indian National Congress
- Occupation: Politician

Narottam Lal Joshi (16 December 1914 – 3 December 1994) was an Indian politician who served as the first Speaker of the Rajasthan Legislative Assembly from 31 March 1952 to 25 April 1957 and the Congress MLA of Jhunjhunu.

After India's independence, in the first general election held in India in 1952, Joshi became a member of the Legislative Assembly and was elected as the first Speaker of the first Rajasthan Legislative Assembly on 31 March 1952.
