= Bhadunda Kalan =

Village in Rajasthan, India

Bhadunda Kalan Bada Bharunda Bharonda Kalan
- Village
- Location in Rajasthan, India Bhadunda Kalan (India)
- Coordinates: 28.0718°N 75.5259°E
- Country: India
- State: Rajasthan
- District: Jhunjhunu

Government
  - Type: Democratic
  - Body: Gram panchayat
  - MLA: Rajendra Bhamboo
  - Sarpanch: Surendra Kumar
- Elevation: 355 m (1,165 ft)

Population (2011)
  - Total: 4,873

Languages
  - Official: Hindi, Rajasthani
  - Spoken: Rajasthani (Shekhawati, Marwari)
- Time zone: UTC+5:30 (IST)
- PIN: 333024
- Telephone code: +91-1592 / 01592
- Literacy: 76.23% (M - 88.88%) ( F - 63.33%)
- Website: jhunjhunu.rajasthan.gov.in

Bhadunda Kalan, also known as Bada Bharunda, is a village in Jhunjhunu Tehsil, Jhunjhunu District, Rajasthan State, India.

== Census and Population ==
Particulars	Total	Male	Female
Houses	856		
Population	4873	2483	2390
Child (0–6)	619	334	285
Literacy	76.23	88.88%	63.33%
Schedule Caste	1011	505	506
Schedule Tribe	111	53	58

Above data is included according to the 2011 Census of India.
