= Madan Singh Chouhan =

Madan Singh Chauhan (born 15 October 1947) also known as "Guruji" is a Folk & Sufi Singer from Raipur, Chhattisgarh, India. In 2020, he received the Padma Shri honour from the Government of India for his contribution in the field of Art. He was formally presented the Padma Shri by President Ram Nath Kovind at Rashtrapati Bhavan in New Delhi.

== Life ==
Madan Singh Chauhan devoted his entire life to music practice. He Started his career with Dholak and then he spent 30 years using the tabla. His early training in tabla was under Pandit Kanhaiyalal Bhatt, whose mentorship significantly shaped his musical foundation.
