= Khetri Assembly constituency =

Constituency of the Rajasthan legislative assembly in India

Coordinates: 28.00°N 75.78°E

Khetri
- Constituency No. 31 for the Rajasthan Legislative Assembly

Constituency details
- Country: India
- Region: North India
- State: Rajasthan
- District: Jhunjhunu
- Established: 1951
- Reservation: None

Member of Legislative Assembly
- 16th Rajasthan Legislative Assembly
- Incumbent Dharmpal Gurjar
- Party: Bhartiya Janata Party
- Elected year: 2023

Khetri Assembly constituency is one of constituencies of Rajasthan Legislative Assembly in the Jhunjhunu Lok Sabha constituency.

Khetri assembly constituency is considered as gurjar dominant . The numbers of gurjar voters in this area is 35% (80 thousand) of total voters .

== Towns and villages in the constituency ==
Babai, Barau, Basai, Beelwa, Charawas, Dada Fatehpura, Dalelpura, Dudhwa Nanglia, Gadrata, Gorir, Gotthra, Hardiya, Jasrapur, Kalota, Kankariya, Kharkhara, Khetri, Loyal, Madhogarh, Mandri, Manota Jatan, Manota Kalan, Mehada, Jatuwas, Jasrapur, Nagli Saledisingh, Nalpur, Nanglia Gujarwas, Nanuwali Bawari, Norangpura, Papurana, Rajota, Rasoolpur, Ravan, Sefraguwar, Shimla, Shyampura, Sihor, Tatija, Thathwadi, Tiba, Tyonda and more.

== Members of the Legislative Assembly ==
Year	Name	Party
1951	Raghubirsingh	Akhil Bharatiya Ram Rajya Parishad
1957	Shish Ram Ola	Indian National Congress
1962	Shish Ram Ola	Indian National Congress
1967	R Singh	Swatantra Party
1972	Ramji Lal	Swatantra Party
1977	Mala Ram	Janata Party
1980	Mala Ram	Bharatiya Janata Party
1985	Mala Ram	Bharatiya Janata Party
1990	Hajari Lal	Independent
1993	Jitendra Singh	Indian National Congress
1998	Jitendra Singh	Indian National Congress
2003	Data Ram	Bharatiya Janata Party
2008	Jitendra Singh	Indian National Congress
2013	Pooranmal Saini	Bahujan Samaj Party
2018	Jitendra Singh	Indian National Congress
2023	Dharmpal Gurjar	Bharatiya Janata Party

== Election results ==
=== 2023 ===
2023 Rajasthan Legislative Assembly election: Khetri
Party	Candidate	Votes	%	±%
BJP	Dharmpal	70,597	41.82	+5.12
BSP	Manoj Ghumaria	61,483	36.42	+13.46
INC	Manisha	27,981	16.57	−20.75
Independent	Pooranmal Saini	4,964	2.94	
NOTA	None of the above	1,013	0.6	−0.3
Majority		9,114	5.4	+4.78
Turnout		168,825	74.09	+0.26
BJP gain from INC		Swing		

=== 2018 ===
2018 Rajasthan Legislative Assembly election: Khetri
Party	Candidate	Votes	%	±%
INC	Dr Jitendra Singh	57,153	37.32	
BJP	Dharmpal	56,196	36.7	
BSP	Pooranmal Saini	35,166	22.96	
NOTA	None of the above	1,373	0.9	
Majority		957	0.62	
Turnout		153,136	73.83	
INC gain from		Swing		

== See also ==
- Member of the Legislative Assembly (India)
