= Sumitra Singh =

Indian politician

14th Speaker of the Rajasthan Legislative Assembly
- In office 16 January 2004 - 1 January 2009
- Preceded by: Parasram Maderna
- Succeeded by: Deependra Singh Shekhawat

Member of the Rajasthan Legislative Assembly
- In office 1957 - 1962, 1985 – 1992
- Constituency: Pilani, Rajasthan
- In office 1962 - 1980, 1998 – 2008
- Constituency: Jhunjhunu, Rajasthan

Personal details
- Born: 3 May 1930 (age 96) Kisari Village, Jhunjhunu, Rajasthan
- Party: Indian National Congress
- Other political affiliations: Bharatiya Janata Party
- Education: Master of Arts
- Alma mater: Banasthali Vidyapith; Maharaja College, Jaipur

Sumitra Singh (born 3 May 1930) is a veteran Indian politician whose political career spans more than five decades. She became the first woman speaker of the Rajasthan Legislative Assembly from 2004 to 2009. She was elected to the Rajasthan Legislative Assembly for nine terms, out of which in three terms she represented Pilani constituency while she represented Jhunjhunu constituency for six terms. She is one of the most successful woman politicians of Rajasthan.

== Early life and education ==
She was born on 3 May 1930 in Kisari village of Jhunjhunu district in the Indian state of Rajasthan. She did Master of Arts in Hindi literature from Banasthali Vidyapith.

== Political career ==
Sumitra Singh political career spans over five decades. She began her political journey in 1957 when she was first elected to the Rajasthan Legislative Assembly from the Pilani constituency. She represented Pilani until 1962, after which she served as the MLA for the Jhunjhunu constituency from 1962 to 1980. Returning to Pilani, she was re-elected for two consecutive terms from 1985 to 1992. Singh then represented Jhunjhunu again from 1998 to 2008, completing a total of nine terms in the Rajasthan assembly.

In 2004, she made history by becoming the first woman Speaker of the Rajasthan Legislative Assembly, a position she held until 2009.
