= Santosh Ahlawat =

Indian politician

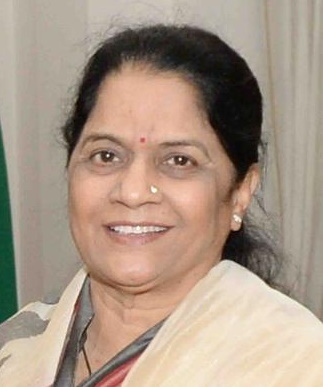

Member of Parliament
- In office May 2014 – May 2019
- Preceded by: Sis Ram Ola
- Succeeded by: Narendra Kumar
- Constituency: Jhunjhunu

Personal details
- Born: 6 July 1963 (age 63) Jhunjhunu, Rajasthan, India
- Party: Bharatiya Janata Party
- Spouse: Surendra Singh Ahlawat
- Education: Rajasthan University
- Profession: Politician, Social worker

Santosh Ahlawat (born 6 July 1963) is an Indian politician. She was member of Lok Sabha, from 2014 to 2019, from Jhunjhunu, and former member of Rajasthan Legislative Assembly elected in 2013 from Surajgarh as a candidate of Bharatiya Janata Party. Born in 1965 in Surajgarh, she is married to Surendra Singh Ahlawat. she completed her master's degree in Political Science and Economics from University of Rajasthan and worked in the education field. Later she joined politics. On 16 May 2014 she became a member of Parliament, and was the first-ever female MP from Jhunjhunu, after a record victory of more than 2.34 lac votes.

She started her career as a teacher, and over the years she did tremendous work in field of education, and made the town Surajgarh an educational hub. She serves the society now in the fields of education, politics and social services.
