= Dayaram Parmar =

Member of the Rajasthan Legislative Assembly

Member of the Rajasthan Legislative Assembly
- Incumbent
- Assumed office 2018
- Constituency: Kherwara

Personal details
- Born: 7 April 1945 (age 81) Udaipur, Rajasthan, India
- Party: Indian National Congress
- Occupation: Agriculture
- Website: Dayaram Parmar profile on Raj PCC

Dayaram Parmar (born 7 April 1945) is an Indian politician who is an elected member from Kherwara Assembly constituency in Udaipur district of Rajasthan. And he is a member of the Indian National Congress party.
