= Narayan Lal Panchariya =

Indian politician

MP of Rajya Sabha for Rajasthan
- In office 10 April 2014 – 23 march 2020
- Constituency: Rajasthan

Personal details
- Born: 10 August 1954 (age 70); Phalodi, Rajasthan, India
- Political party: Bharatiya Janata Party
- Spouse: Sumitra Panchariya

Narayan Lal Panchariya (born 10 August 1954) is an Indian politician. He was a Rajya Sabha Member of Parliament in Rajasthan. He was elected to Rajya Sabha in the 2014 election. He lives in the Jodhpur district in Rajasthan.

Now he is the State Convenor - BJP Election Management Committee, Rajasthan Assembly Elections 2023 and State Vice President - BJP Rajasthan
