= Harji Ram Burdak =

Indian politician (1931–2013)

State Minister Government of Rajasthan
- In office 19 December 2008 – 20 December 2013

Member of the Rajasthan Legislative Assembly
- Constituency: Ladnun Assembly constituency

Personal details
- Born: 15 July 1931 Bharnava, Nagaur, Rajasthan, India
- Died: 20 December 2013 (aged 82)
- Party: Indian National Congress
- Other political affiliations: Independent (before 1993, 2008)
- Spouse: Hasti Devi
- Children: 3 sons, 2 daughters
- Profession: Politician

Harji Ram Burdak (15 July 1931 – 20 December 2013) was an Indian politician. He served as minister of agriculture in Government of Rajasthan. He was member of the Indian National Congress. He was elected to the Rajasthan Legislative Assembly for six terms between 1967 and 2013.

== Early life ==
Burdak was born on 15 July 1931 in the village of Bharnava, in the Tehsil Ladnu of Nagaur district; Harji Ram Burdak was the son of Luna Ram Burdak and Tulsi Devi. He pursued his education in Hindi, earning the title of ‘Bhasha Ratna’.

== Career ==
=== Politics ===
Burdak started his political career when he became elected as Sarpanch in Bharnawa in 1954 and then he was elected first Pradhan of Ladnu Panchayat Samiti in 1959. He served as a Member of the Legislative Assembly in Rajasthan for six terms. His political journey began as an independent when he was first elected as an MLA in 1967. He later joined the Janata Party, representing them in 1977, and then the Lokdal Party in 1985. Burdak's affiliation with the Indian National Congress began in 1993, and he was re-elected under their banner in 1998. In 2008, he returned to the assembly as an independent but supported the Indian National Congress. His tenure in politics also included a significant role as the Agriculture Minister in the Rajasthan government.

=== Social life ===
He has been Chairperson of Government Undertakings Committee of Rajasthan Assembly. He has been associated with Rural Development, Cooperative movement and Panchayati Raj in Rajasthan. He was Sarpanch of Gram-panchayat Sandas and Gram-panchayat Bharnava for 3–4 times. He was pradhan of Ladnun Panchayat Samiti thrice. He has been Chairman of District Cooperative Bank Nagaur and District Cooperative Federation Nagaur. He has been member of Jodhpur University Senate and Syndicate and the member of V.C. Selection Committee from 1977 to 1980. Shri Burdak was vice-president of Rajasthan Janta Party from 1977 to 1978, President of Rajasthan Janta Dal from 1990 to 1991. He was member of Rajasthan Pradesh Congress Committee. He was member of Western Railway Advisory Committee Mumbai and General Secretary of Rajasthan Panchayat Raj Sangh.
