= Pitram Singh Kala =

Indian politician

Member of the Rajasthan Legislative Assembly
- Incumbent
- Assumed office 3 December 2023
- Preceded by: J.P. Chandelia
- Constituency: Pilani

Personal details
- Born: 1 January 1964 (age 62) Pilani, Jhunjhunu, Rajasthan, India
- Party: Indian National Congress
- Spouse: Sushila Devi Kala
- Children: 3
- Education: B.E.d. & M.A.
- Alma mater: University of Rajasthan & Maharshi Dayanand Saraswati University
- Profession: Politician

Pitram Singh Kala (1 January 1964) is an Indian politician serving as member of 16th Rajasthan Legislative Assembly from Pilani. He is a Member of the Indian National Congress.

== Political career ==
Following the 2023 Rajasthan Legislative Assembly election he was elected as an MLA from the Pilani Assembly constituency after defeating Bharatiya Janata Party (BJP) candidate Shri.Rajesh Dahiya by a margin of 14,845 votes.
