= Pilani Assembly constituency =

Constituency of the Rajasthan legislative assembly in India

Coordinates: 28.38°N 75.61°E

Pilani
- Constituency No. 25 for the Rajasthan Legislative Assembly

Constituency details
- Country: India
- Region: North India
- State: Rajasthan
- District: Jhunjhunu district
- Established: 1957
- Reservation: SC

Member of Legislative Assembly
- 16th Rajasthan Legislative Assembly
- Incumbent Pitram Singh Kala
- Party: Indian National Congress
- Elected year: 2023

Pilani Assembly constituency is one of the constituencies of Rajasthan Legislative Assembly, and is a segment of Jhunjhunu (Lok Sabha constituency).

Pilani constituency covers all voters from parts of Chirawa tehsil, which include ILRC Pilani including Pilani Municipal Board and Vidhya Vihar Municipal Board, ILRC Chirawa including Chirawa Municipal Board, ILRC Mandrela and Adooka, Farat and Sehi Kalan of ILRC Surajgarh.

== Member of the Legislative Assembly ==
Election	Member	Party
1. 1957	Sumitra Singh	Indian National Congress
2. 1962	Hajari Lal	Independent
3. 1967	M C Katewa	Swatantra Party
4. 1972	Shish Ram Ola	Indian National Congress
5. 1977	Shish Ram Ola	Indian National Congress
6. 1980	Hajari Lal	Janata Party
7. 1985	Sumitra Singh	Lok Dal
8. 1990	Sumitra Singh	Janata Dal
9. 1993	Sharwan Kumar	Independent
10. 1998	Sharwan Kumar	Indian National Congress
11. 2003	Sharwan Kumar	Indian National Congress
12. 2008	Sunder Lal Kaka	Bharatiya Janata Party
13. 2013	Sunder Lal Kaka	Bharatiya Janata Party
14. 2018	J.P. Chandelia	Indian National Congress
15. 2023	Pitram Singh Kala	Indian National Congress

== Election results ==
=== 2023 ===
2023 Rajasthan Legislative Assembly election: Pilani
Party	Candidate	Votes	%	±%
INC	Pitram Singh Kala	72,835	42.16	−10.27
BJP	Rajesh Kumar Dahia	57,990	33.57	−10.48
Independent	Kailash Chand Meghwal	35,575	20.59	
RLP	Ramswaroop Singh	1,951	1.13	
NOTA	None of the above	1,145	0.66	−0.39
Majority		14,845	8.59	+0.21
Turnout		172,747	69.22	−0.09
INC hold		Swing		

=== 2018 ===
2018 Rajasthan Legislative Assembly election: Pilani
Party	Candidate	Votes	%	±%
INC	J.P. Chandelia	84,715	52.43	
BJP	Kailash Chand	71,176	44.05	
NOTA	None of the above	1,704	1.05	
Majority		13,539	8.38	
Turnout		161,569	69.31	
INC gain from		Swing		

== See also ==
- Member of the Legislative Assembly (India)
