= Mandawa Assembly constituency =

Constituency of the Rajasthan legislative assembly in India

Coordinates: 28.06°N 75.15°E

Mandawa
- Constituency No. 28 for the Rajasthan Legislative Assembly

Constituency details
- Country: India
- Region: North India
- State: Rajasthan
- District: Jhunjhunu district
- Established: 1957
- Reservation: None

Member of Legislative Assembly
- 16th Rajasthan Legislative Assembly
- Incumbent Rita Choudhary
- Party: Indian National Congress

Mandawa Assembly constituency is one of constituencies of Rajasthan Legislative Assembly in the Jhunjhunu Lok Sabha constituency.

Mandawa constituency covers all voters from parts of Jhunjhunu tehsil and Malsisar tehisil, which include ILRC Mandawa including Mandawa Municipal Board, ILRC Bissau including Bisau Municipal Board, ILRC Malsisar and ILRC Alsisar.

== Members of the Legislative Assembly ==
Year	Member	Party
1957	Lachhu Ram	Communist Party of India
1962	Raghuvir Singh	Swatantra Party
1967	Ram Narayan Chaudhary	Indian National Congress
1972	Ram Narain Choudhary	Indian National Congress
1977	Ram Narain Choudhary	Indian National Congress
1980	Lachhu Ram	Janata Party
1985	Sudha Devi	Indian National Congress
1990	Chandra Bhan	Janata Dal
1993	Ram Narain Choudhary	Indian National Congress
1998	Ram Narain Choudhary	Indian National Congress
2003	Ram Narain Choudhary	Indian National Congress
2008	Rita Choudhary	Indian National Congress
2013	Narendra Kumar	Independent
2018	Narendra Kumar	Bharatiya Janata Party
2019★	Rita Choudhary	Indian National Congress
2023	Rita Choudhary	Indian National Congress

★By Election

== Election results ==
=== 2023 ===
2023 Rajasthan Legislative Assembly election: Mandawa
Party	Candidate	Votes	%	±%
INC	Rita Choudhary	98,747	53.31	+6.01
BJP	Narendra Kumar	80,030	43.21	−5.51
BSP	Mohammad Sadique	2,114	1.14	−0.81
NOTA	None of the above	1,127	0.61	+0.06
Majority		18,717	10.1	+8.68
Turnout		185,232	74.53	+1.18
INC hold		Swing		

=== 2019 bypoll ===
2019 Rajasthan Legislative assembly by-election: Mandawa
Party	Candidate	Votes	%	±%
INC	Rita Choudhary	94,196		
BJP	Sushila Sigra	60,492		
Independent	Satyaveer Singh Krishnia	1,111		
NOTA	None of the above	915		
Majority		33,704		
Turnout		1,58,864	{{{percentage}}}	
INC gain from BJP		Swing		

=== 2018 ===
2018 Rajasthan Legislative Assembly election: Mandawa
Party	Candidate	Votes	%	±%
BJP	Narendra Kumar	80,599	48.72	
INC	Kum. Rita Choudhary	78,253	47.3	
BSP	Anwar Ali Khan	3,228	1.95	
NOTA	None of the above	908	0.55	
Majority		2,346	1.42	
Turnout		165,444	73.35	

== See also ==
- Member of the Legislative Assembly (India)
