= Jagdish Prasad Mathur =

Indian politician

Jagdish Prasad Mathur (January 13, 1928– 4 August 2007) was an Indian politician and a senior leader of the Bharatiya Janata Party (BJP). He was born in 1928 in Sikar of the present-day Rajasthan state and was associated with Rashtriya Swayamsevak Sangh since 1942. He became a member of the Bharatiya Jana Sangh in 1952. A two-time member of the Rajya Sabha, the upper house of the Indian parliament from 3 April 1978 to 2 April 1984 and from 3 April 1990 to 2 April 1996, Mathur was also the deputy leader of the BJP parliamentary party in the Rajya Sabha in 1993 and chief whip in 1990. He died in Delhi on Saturday, August 4, 2007. His last rites were performed in Jaipur.

== Career ==
An advocate by profession, he was born to Shri. Sajjan Lal and married Smt. Man Mahini Devi. He had one son and two daughters. He was Member of Parliament (MP) from Sikar (Rajasthan). In 1980, on 6 April, on Easter day, when the BJP Bharatiya Janata Party, came into formal existence, after Jan Sangh merged into it, the party adopted 11 Ashoka Road as their party headquarters, in Delhi. This bungalow had been allotted to Jagdish Prasad Mathur, as one of the founding members of the Jan Sangh, after he was nominated to the Rajya Sabha in 1978. Although he believed in secular India, he also said that the true ethos of India lay in its religion of Hinduism, which was, real self of the Indian people, away from western influences. It was Jagdish Prasad Mathur who gave the party its lotus symbol, which is the national flower of India.

Quote:- "The lotus normally grows out of dirty water - in the dirty parts of India, we are emerging as beautiful," said Mr Jagdish Prasad Mathur, national secretary of the BJP."
