= Zahida =

Zahida or Zaheeda is a feminine given name of Arabic origin. Notable people with the name include:

== Given name ==
- Zahida Hina, Pakistani writer
- Zahida Hussain (born 1944), Indian actress
- Zahida Manzoor (born 1958), English businesswoman
- Zaheeda Mohamad Ariff (born 1971), crown princess of Kedah
