= Hakam Ali Khan =

Indian politician

Chairman Waqf Development Council, Rajasthan
- In office December 2022 – December 2023

General Secretary Rajasthan Pradesh Congress Committee
- Incumbent
- Assumed office Jan 2021

Member of the Rajasthan Legislative Assembly
- Incumbent
- Assumed office 2018
- Constituency: Fatehpur

Personal details
- Party: Indian National Congress
- Children: 4
- Profession: Farmer, Politician

Hakam Ali Khan is an Indian politician belonging to the Indian National Congress. He was the Chairman Of Waqf Development Council Rajasthan. He is a Member of the Rajasthan Legislative Assembly from Fatehpur Assembly constituency. He was appointed the General Secretary Of Rajasthan Pradesh Congress Committee in January 2021.
