= Pratap Singh (Rajasthan politician) =

Indian politician

Member of the Rajasthan Legislative Assembly
- In office 1951–1956
- Constituency: Sujangarh

Personal details
- Cause of death: Lung failure
- Resting place: Delhi
- Party: Independent
- Education: Aligarh Muslim University
- Occupation: Politician, Editor

Pratap Singh was an Indian politician (Independent) and a member of the Rajasthan Legislative Assembly representing the Sujangarh Vidhan Sabha constituency of Rajasthan.
