= Rita Choudhary =

Indian politician

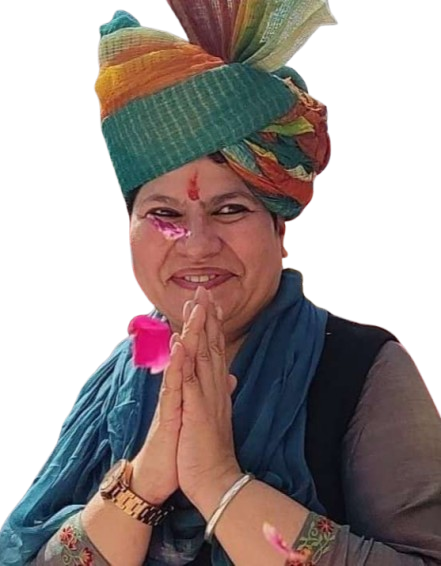

Member of the Rajasthan Legislative Assembly
- In office 2008–2013
- Constituency: Mandawa, Jhunjhunu
- Incumbent
- Assumed office 2019
- Constituency: Mandawa, Jhunjhunu

Personal details
- Born: Hetamsar, Jhunjhunu
- Party: Indian National Congress
- Parent: Ram Narayan Chaudhary (father)
- Education: University of Rajasthan (BA, MA); Newport University (MBA)
- Occupation: Politician

Rita Choudhary is an Indian politician from Rajasthan. She is a member of Rajasthan Legislative Assembly from Mandawa Constituency of Jhunjhunu. She is member of Indian National Congress. She is daughter of former cabinet minister and seven-term assembly member Ram Narayan Chaudhary.

== Early life ==
Choudhary was born in family of senior politician Ram Narayan Chaudhary at Hetamsar Village of Jhunjhunu District in Rajasthan.

== Political career ==
=== Membership of the Rajasthan Legislative Assembly ===
SI No.	Assembly	Tenure	Constituency	Party
1.	13th Rajasthan Legislative Assembly.	2008 - 2013	Mandawa	Indian National Congress
2.	15th Rajasthan Legislative Assembly.	2019 - 2023	Mandawa	Indian National Congress
3.	16th Rajasthan Legislative Assembly.	Incumbent	Mandawa	Indian National Congress
