= Shish Ram Ola =

Indian politician

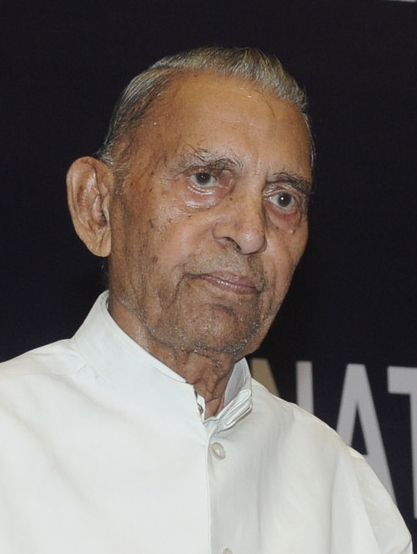

Minister of Labour and Employment Government of India
- In office 17 June 2013 – 15 December 2013
- Prime Minister: Manmohan Singh
- Preceded by: Mallikarjun Kharge
- Succeeded by: Oscar Fernandes
- In office 23 May 2004 – 27 November 2004
- Prime Minister: Manmohan Singh
- Preceded by: Sahib Singh Verma
- Succeeded by: K. Chandrashekhar Rao

Minister of Mines Government of India
- In office 27 November 2004 – 22 May 2009
- Prime Minister: Manmohan Singh
- Preceded by: Manmohan Singh
- Succeeded by: Bijoy Krishna Handique

Member of Parliament, Lok Sabha
- In office 10 May 1996 – 17 May 2014
- Preceded by: Mohd. Ayub Khan
- Succeeded by: Santosh Ahlawat
- Constituency: Jhunjhunu

Personal details
- Born: 30 July 1927 Jhunjhunu, Rajasthan
- Died: 15 December 2013 (aged 86) Gurgaon, India
- Party: Indian National Congress
- Spouse: Smt. Sheobai
- Children: Brijendra Singh Ola; Sarjeet Ola; Chandrakala
- Awards: Padma Shri (1968)
- As of 30 June, 2013

Shish Ram Ola (30 July 1927 – 15 December 2013) was a politician from Jhunjhunu district in Rajasthan. Ola dominated the Jat politics of Shekhawati region for a period of more than four decades. He was elected in Rajasthan Legislative Assembly for seven terms and in Lok Sabha for five terms. He was a member of the Indian National Congress.

== Political career ==
Ola had a distinguished political career, serving as a member of the Rajasthan Legislative Assembly from 1957 to 1990. During this period, from 1980 to 1990, he also held the role of Cabinet Minister in the Government of Rajasthan. He returned to the assembly from 1993 to 1996. In 1996, he was elected to the 11th Lok Sabha and was appointed as the Union Minister of State for Chemicals and Fertilizers with Independent Charge, a position he held from 1996 to 1997. He then served as the Union Minister of State for Water Resources with Independent Charge from 1997 to 1998.

Following his tenure as minister, he was re-elected to the 12th Lok Sabha in 1998, the 13th Lok Sabha in 1999, the 14th Lok Sabha in 2004, and the 15th Lok Sabha in 2009. From 23 May 2004 to 27 November 2004, he served as the Union Cabinet Minister of Labour and Employment and subsequently as the Union Cabinet Minister of Mines under Prime Minister Dr. Manmohan Singh’s administration. Additionally, he was the Zila Pramukh of Jhunjhunu, and his son, Birjendra Ola, is a Member of the Legislative Assembly (MLA) from Jhunjhunu and a former minister in the Rajasthan government.

Ola was honored with the Padma Shri award in 1968. He was a pioneer in promoting girls’ education in rural Rajasthan, founding the Indira Gandhi Balika Niketan Ardawata in 1952 with just three students. His persistent efforts since then have significantly improved literacy rates, elevating Jhunjhunu district to the third-highest literacy rate in Rajasthan according to the 2011 census.

== Death ==
Ola died in a Hospital in Gurgaon on 15 December 2013 because of cardiac arrest. He had been admitted to a hospital with a cardiac complaint.

== Positions held ==
From 1957 to 1990 and again from 1993 to 1996, he served as a Member of the Rajasthan Legislative Assembly. During 1980-1990, he was appointed as a Cabinet Minister in the Government of Rajasthan, overseeing departments such as Panchayati Raj, Rural Development, Forest and Environment, Public Health Engineering, Irrigation, Transport, Co-operatives, Excise, Underground Water, and Soldiers' Welfare. From 1960 to 1977, he held the position of Zila Pramukh in Jhunjhunu, Rajasthan.

His involvement with the Rajasthan Pradesh Congress Committee spanned from 1960 to 1995, where he held various roles including Member of the Executive Committee, Chairman of the Kisan Cell, Treasurer, and Member of the Pradesh Congress Election Committee. He was also a Member of the Executive of the Congress Legislative Party in the Rajasthan Legislative Assembly. Since 1972, he has been a Member of the All India Congress Committee.

In 1996, he was elected to the 11th Lok Sabha and served as the Union Minister of State for Chemicals and Fertilizers with Independent Charge from 1996 to 1997, and as the Union Minister of State for Water Resources with Independent Charge from 1997 to 1998. He was re-elected to the 12th Lok Sabha for his second term in 1998. During this term, he was a Member of the Committee on Commerce and its Sub-Committee on Textiles, the Joint Committee on Salaries and Allowances of Members of Parliament, and the Consultative Committee for the Ministry of Defence.

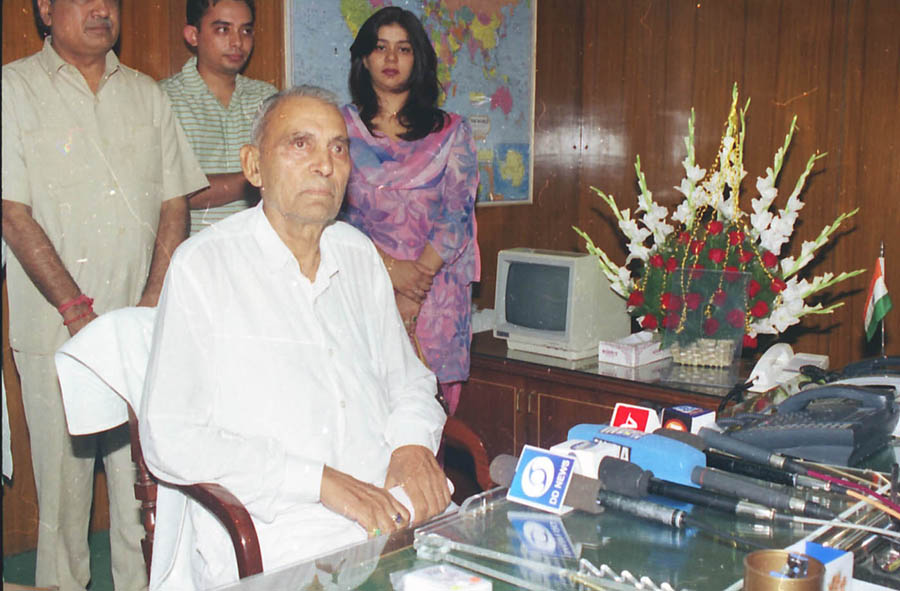
Shri Sis Ram Ola in his office after taking over the charge as the Union Minister of Labour & Employment in New Delhi on May 24, 2004

He was re-elected to the 13th Lok Sabha for his third term in 1999, where he served on the Committee on Petitions, the Committee on Members of Parliament Local Area Development Scheme, and the Committee on Food, Civil Supplies, and Public Distribution. In 2004, he was elected to the 14th Lok Sabha for his fourth term and subsequently to the 15th Lok Sabha for his fifth term in 2009. He served as the Union Cabinet Minister for Labour and Employment from 23 May 2004 to 27 November 2004, and as the Union Cabinet Minister for Mines from 27 November 2004 onwards. In 2009, he was elected as a Congress MP from Jhunjhunu, and on 17 June 2013 he was sworn in as the Cabinet Minister for Labour.

Lok Sabha
Preceded by Mohd. Ayub Khan	Member of Parliament for Jhunjhunu; 1996–2013	Succeeded by Santosh Ahlawat
Political offices
Preceded by Mallikarjun Kharge	Minister of Labour and Employment; 17 June 2013 – 15 December 2013	Succeeded by Narendra Singh Tomar
