= Fatehpur, Rajasthan Assembly constituency =

Constituency of the Rajasthan legislative assembly in India

Coordinates: 28.00°N 74.96°E

Fatehpur
- Constituency for the Rajasthan Legislative Assembly

Constituency details
- Country: India
- Region: North India
- State: Rajasthan
- District: Sikar district
- Lok Sabha constituency: Jhunjhunu
- Established: 1957

Member of Legislative Assembly
- 16th Rajasthan Legislative Assembly
- Incumbent Hakam Ali Khan
- Party: Indian National Congress
- Elected year: 2018

Fatehpur Assembly constituency is one of constituencies of Rajasthan Legislative Assembly in the Jhunjhunu Lok Sabha constituency. Current MLA of Fatehpur constituency is Hakam Ali Khan of INC who won against Sunita Kumari of BJP by 853 votes in 2018 assembly elections and against Sharawan Chaudhari of BJP by 25,993 votes in 2023 assembly elections. Hakam Ali Khan is younger brother of former three time MLA Bhanwaru Khan.

Fatehpur constituency covers all voters from Fathehpur tehsil.

== Members of the Legislative Assembly ==
Year	Name	Party
1957	Abdul Gaffar Khan	Indian National Congress
1962	Balu Ram khatkar	Independent
1967	Alam Ali Khan	Swatantra Party
1972	Jhabar Mal	Indian National Congress
1977	Alam Ali Khan	Janata Party
1980	Trilok Singh	Communist Party of India
1985	Ask Ali	Indian National Congress
1990	Dilsukhrai	Janata Dal
1993	Banwari Lal	Bharatiya Janata Party
1998	Bhanwaru Khan	Indian National Congress
2003	Bhanwaru Khan	Indian National Congress
2008	Bhanwaru Khan	Indian National Congress
2013	Nand Kishore Maharia	Independent
2018	Hakam Ali Khan	Indian National Congress
2023	Hakam Ali Khan	Indian National Congress

== Election results ==
=== 2023 ===
2023 Rajasthan Legislative Assembly election: Fatehpur
Party	Candidate	Votes	%	±%
INC	Hakam Ali Khan	84,194	46.38	−0.71
BJP	Sharawan Choudhary S/O Prem Singh	58,201	32.06	−14.53
JJP	Nand Kishore Maharia	23,851	13.14	
Independent	Madhu Sudan	8,786	4.84	
Independent	Sharwan Choudhary S/O Pitharam	2,221	1.22	
NOTA	None of the above	762	0.42	−0.26
Majority		25,993	14.32	+13.82
Turnout		181,512	71.24	−2.83
INC hold		Swing		

=== 2018 ===
2018 Rajasthan Legislative Assembly election: Fatehpur
Party	Candidate	Votes	%	±%
INC	Hakam Ali Khan	80,354	47.09	
BJP	Sunita Kumari	79,494	46.59	
CPI(M)	Abid Hussain	3,931	2.3	
BSP	Zarina Banu	1,965	1.15	
NOTA	None of the above	1,165	0.68	
Majority		860	0.5	
Turnout		170,627	74.07	
INC gain from Independent		Swing		

=== 2008 ===
2008 Rajasthan Legislative Assembly election: Fatehpur
Party	Candidate	Votes	%	±%
INC	Bhanwaru khan	47,590	44.91	
BJP	Nand Kishore Maharia	39,326	37.11	
Independent	Bhagirath	7,698	7.26	New entry
BSP	Mool Chand	5,949	5.61	
LJP	A. Ajij	1,040	0.98	New entry
Majority		8,264	7.80	
Turnout		105,690	61.65	
INC gain from BJP		Swing		

== See also ==
- Member of the Legislative Assembly (India)
