= Shankar Singh (Rajasthan politician) =

Indian politician

Member of the Rajasthan Legislative Assembly
- Incumbent
- Assumed office 2008
- Constituency: Beawar

Personal details
- Party: Bharatiya Janata Party
- Occupation: Politician

Shankar Singh is an Indian politician from the Bharatiya Janata Party and a member of the Rajasthan Legislative Assembly representing the Beawar Vidhan Sabha constituency of Rajasthan.
