= Nua (Rajasthan) =

- Town
- Location in Rajasthan, India Nua (India)
- Coordinates: 28.12°N 75.1°E
- Country: India
- State: Rajasthan
- District: Jhunjhunu

Government
  - Type: panchaytiraj
  - MP: Narendra kumar
  - MLA: rita choudhary

Population (2011)
  - Total: 7,000

Languages = Shekhawati, Hindi, Marwadi
  - Official: Hindi
  - Spoken: Shekhawati & Marwari
- Time zone: UTC+5:30 (IST)
- PIN: 333041
- Telephone code: +91-1592
- Vehicle registration: RJ-18
- Website: jhunjhunu.rajasthan.gov.in

Nua is a small town located in Jhunjhunu district, in the state of Rajasthan, India.

There is one hospital with initial emergency service, established in 1970.

It has a railway station established in 1926 and is served by six daily trains, and was one of the locals where the 2011 Hindi comedy film Chalo Dilli was shot and 2020 web series Bard Of Blood Season 1 was also shot here .

There are two government schools and one private girls college.
