= Rajendra Bhamboo =

Indian politician

Member of Rajasthan Legislative Assembly
- Incumbent
- Assumed office 23 November 2024
- Preceded by: Brijendra Singh Ola
- Constituency: Jhunjhunu

Personal details
- Political party: Bharatiya Janata Party
- Profession: Politician

Rajendra Bhamboo is an Indian politician from the state of Rajasthan. He is a member of the Bharatiya Janata Party. Bhamboo won in the 2024-by election contested in the Rajasthan state with a huge margin of votes, representing Jhunjhunu Assembly constituency.
