= Rajkumar Sharma (politician) =

Indian politician (born 1973)

- Constituency: Nawalgarh, Jhunjhunu

Personal details
- Born: 14 November 1973 (age 51); Parasrampura, Rajasthan, India
- Political party: Congress
- Education: M.A.(Sanskrit), Ph.D.
- Occupation: Politician

Rajkumar Sharma (born 14 November 1973) is a politician from the Indian state of Rajasthan. He was a member of Rajasthan Legislative Assembly from Nawalgarh constituency of Jhunjhunu.

== Early life ==
Rajkumar Sharma was born on 14 November 1973 in Parasrampura, Rajasthan. He has a Masters degree in Sanskrit and a Ph.D.

== Posts held ==
- 1992–1997, President, Akhil Rajasthan Sanskrit Chatra Sangharsh Samiti
- 1993–1995, President, Maharaj Sanskrit Mahavidyalaya (elected three times consecutively)
- 1995, Student Senator (elected), Rajasthan University
- 1999–2000, President (elected), Rajasthan University Students' Union
- 2001, President, Yuva Vikas Manch
- 2008–2013, Member 13th Rajasthan Legislative Assembly, represented Nawalgarh Assembly Constituency by winning the election on Bahujan Samaj Party (BSP) seat with the highest margin of 14088 votes in entire Jhunjhunu district.
- 2009–2013, Minister of State for Science & Technology (Independent Charge); Medical & Health, Family Welfare, Ayurveda and Medical Education, Government of Rajasthan..
- 2013 onwards, Member 14th Rajasthan Legislative Assembly, representing Nawalgarh Assembly Constituency by winning the election as an Independent candidate with a huge margin of 33566 votes.
- 2018 onwards, Member 15th Rajasthan Legislative Assembly, representing Nawalgarh

== Membership of Legislature ==
- 2008–13, 13th Rajasthan Legislative Assembly from Nawalgarh
- 2013 onwards Member 14th Rajasthan Legislative Assembly from Nawalgarh
