= Jhunjhunu =

- City
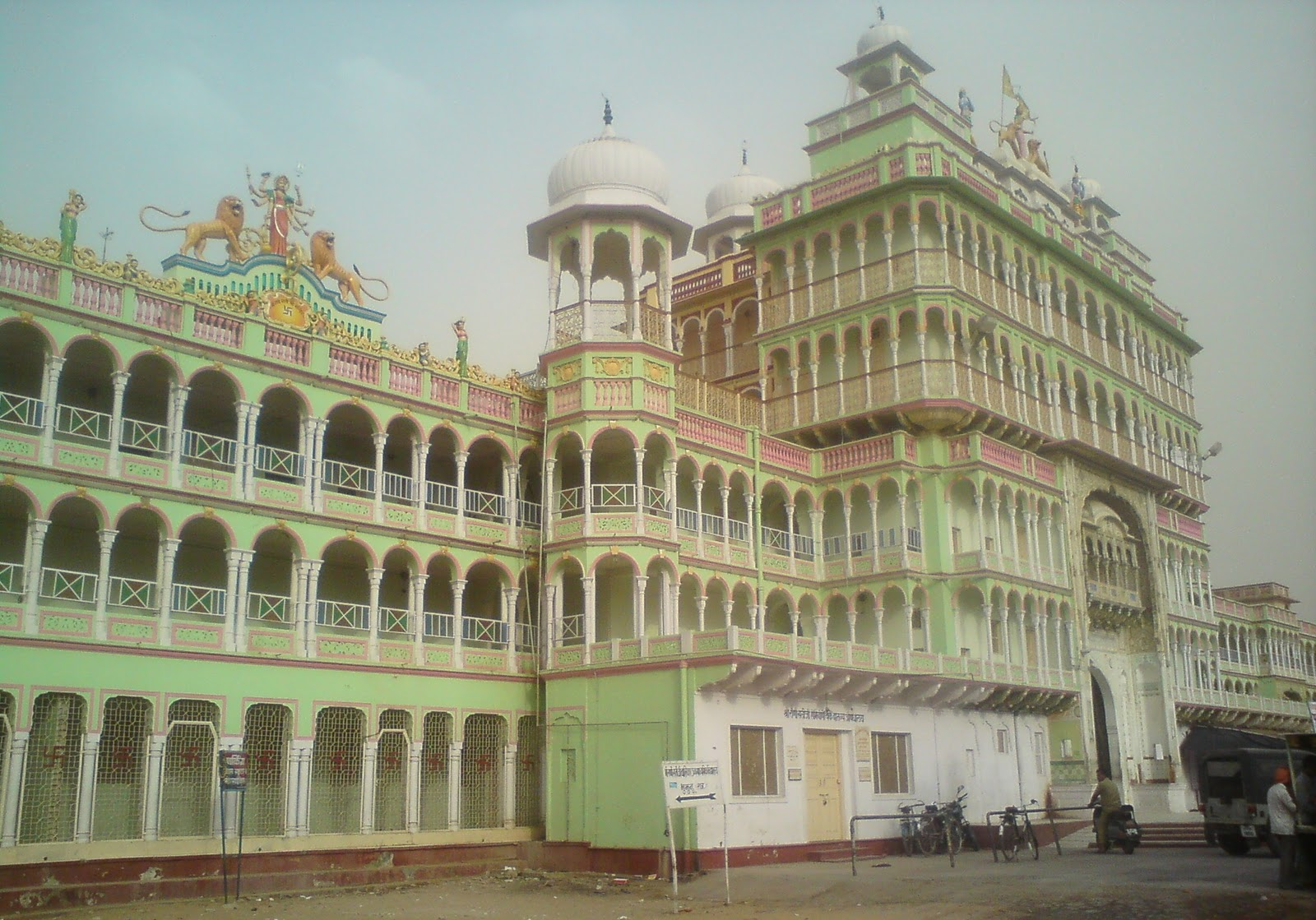
- Rani Sati Temple in Jhunjhunu city, Rajasthan

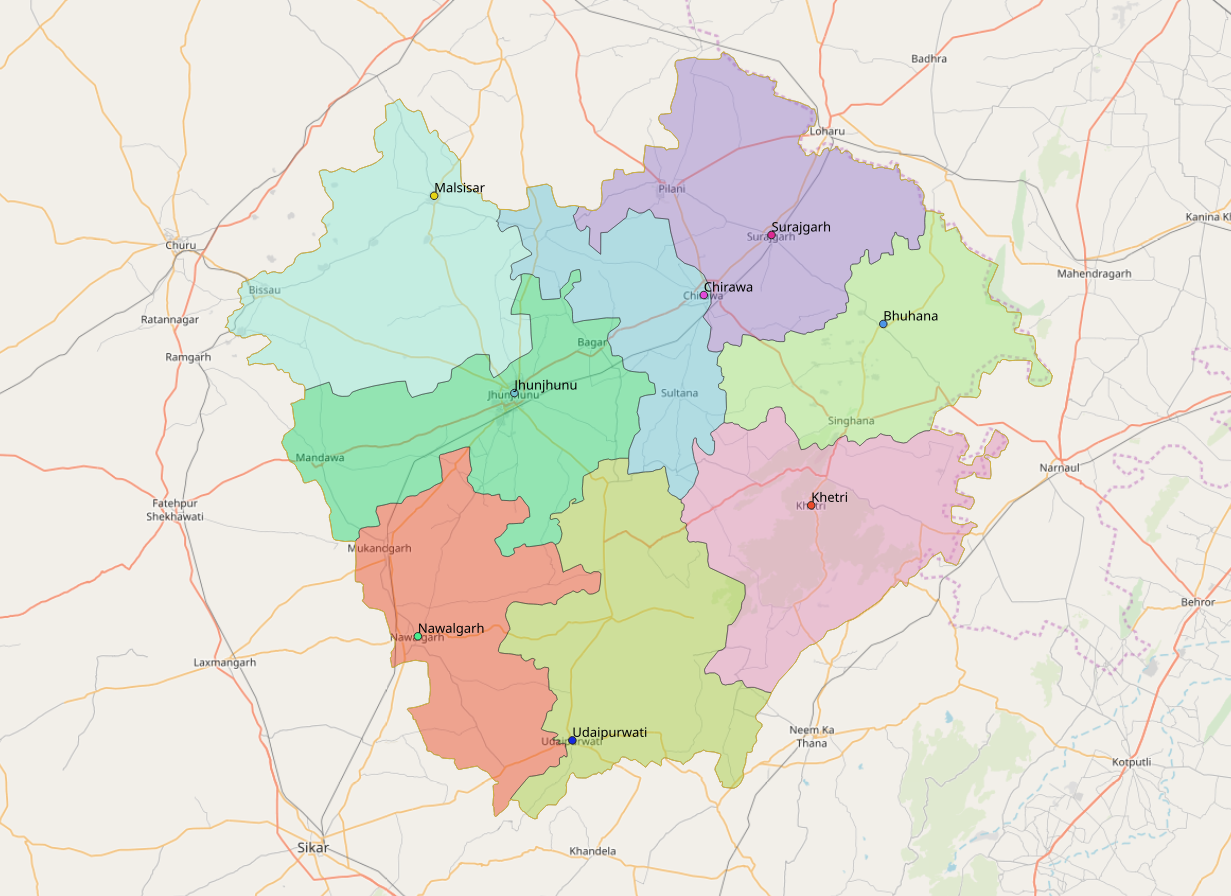
- Location within Jhunjhunu District Location within Rajasthan Location within India
- Coordinates: 28.128876°N 75.399506°E
- Country: India
- State: Rajasthan
- District: Jhunjhunu

Government
  - Type: Municipal Council
  - Body: Jhunjhunu Municipal Council
- Elevation: 323 m (1,060 ft)

Population (2011)
  - Total: 118,473

Languages
  - Official: Hindi
  - Spoken: Shekhawati
- Time zone: UTC+5:30 (IST)
- PIN: 333001
- Telephone code: +91-1592 / 01592
- Vehicle registration: RJ-18
- Literacy: 73.58%
- Website: Jhunjhunu Municipal Council; Jhunjhunu District; Jhunjhunu News

Jhunjhunu is a city and municipal council in the state of Rajasthan in India. It is the administrative headquarters of the Jhunjhunu district. It is also the biggest city of the Shekhawati region, which includes Jhunjhunu, Churu and Sikar.

== Demographics ==
Religions in Jhunjhunu City
Religion	Percent
Hindus	55.21%
Muslims	44.46%
Christianity	0.15%
Jainism	0.14%
Sikhism	0.01%
Buddhism	0.01%
Others	0.02%

In the 2011 India census, the town of Jhunjhunu had a population of 118,473 and a literacy rate of 73.58%.

== Transportation ==
=== Rail ===
Jhunjhunu railway station comes within the territory of the North Western Railway. Jhunjhunu City is connected to Sikar, Rewari, Delhi, Churu, Bikaner, Sri Ganganagar, Hisar, Jaipur, Kota, Ajmer, Udaipur, Indore, Ahmedabad and Mumbai, Alwar.

=== Road ===
Jhunjhunu is well connected by roads from all the major cities of Rajasthan and nearby states. A four-lane national highway National Highway 11, State Highway 8 passes through the city. NH-11 connects Jhunjhunu with Jaisalmer and Rewari, Haryana.

=== Airport ===
The nearest airport to Jhunjhunu City is Jaipur International Airport.

== See also ==
- Jhunjhunu district
- Jhunjhunu Lok Sabha constituency
- Jhunjhunu (Rajasthan Assembly constituency)
