= List of villages in Loharu tehsil =

Villages located in Loharu Tehsil, Haryana State, India.

== List ==
=== A ===
- Ahmedwas
- Akberpur
- Allaudinpur
- Amirwas
- Azempur

=== B ===
- Barahlu
- Bardu Chaina
- Bardu Dhirja
- Bardu Jogi
- Bardu Mughal
- Bardu Puran
- Barwas
- Basirwas
- Bahal
- Beran
- Bidhnoi
- Bisalwas
- Bithan
- Budhera
- Budheri

=== C ===
- Cheher Kalan
- Cheher Khurd

=== D ===
- Damkora
- Dhana Jogi
- Dhani Ahmed
- Dhani Dholan
- Dhani Lachman
- Dhani Mansukh
- Dhani Shama
- Dhani Pitram
- Dhigawa Jattan
- Dhigawa Shamyan

=== F ===
- Fartia Bhima
- Fartia Kaher
- Fartia Tal

=== G ===
- Gagarwas
- Garanpura
- Gignaw
- Gokalpura
- Gopalwas
- Gothra
- Gurera

=== H ===
- Hariawas
- Hasanpur

=== J ===
- Jhanjara Sheoran
- Jhanjra Toda
- Jhumpa Kalan
- Jhumpa Khurd

=== K ===
- Kasni Kalan
- Kasni Khurd
- Kharkari
- Kharkhari 52 wali
- Kurdal
- Kushal Pura

=== L ===
- Ladawas
- Loharu

=== M ===
- Mandhol Kalan
- Mohamad Nagar

=== N ===
- Nakipur
- Nangal
- Nunsar

=== O ===
- Obra

=== P ===
- Pahari
- Paju
- Patwan
- Phartia Bhiman
- Phartia Kehar
- Phartia Tal

=== R ===
- Rahimpur

=== S ===
- Salempur
- Sirsi
- Sehar
- Serla
- Sheharyarpur
- Shehzmanpur
- Shezadpur
- Sidhanwa
- Singhani
- Sohansara
- Sorda Jadid
- Sorda Kadim
- Sudhiwas
- Surpura Kalan
