= Pentalisa =

Territory in Shekhawati, India

Pentalisa was a territory which was located in the region of Shekhawati, India. The group of 45 villages under Udaipurwati was known as Pentalisa. The Bhojraj Ji Ka Shekhawat Rajputs ruled over two territories, Pentalisa and Panch Pana.

== Constituent villages ==
The 45 villages of Pentalisa were:

- Udaipurwati,
- Jhajhar, granted to Kunwar Purshottamdas Ji, elder son of Raja Todermal of Udaipurwati.
- Chirana.
- Khirod, founded by Kunwar Amar Singh and Kunwar Ram Singh, sons of Salehdi Singh, they built a castle in 1825 samwat.
- Gudha, also known as Gudhagorji, established on Margshirsh shukla 5, samwat 1705 by Thakur Jhunjhar Singh Ji, son of Raja Todermal of Udaipurwati.
- Bhojgarh
- Papda (Hukam Singh),
- Bhorki (Bagh Singh),
- Baghor,
- Nangli Saledi Singh
- Nangal,
- Posana,
- Col Rao Bahadur Thakur Balu Singh Shekhawat Sardar Bahadur ,OBI,IDSM,ADC was the 6th Commandant of the Bikaner Ganga Risala .As a Lt Col ,he commanded Risala from 1934 to 1940.He was from Inderpura village near Udaipurwatti , Jhunjhunu.
- Khojas,
- Pachlangi,
- Papda (Chajoo Singh)
- Jodhpura,
- Bagholi, founded by Thakur sahab Anop Singh ji
- Sefragonwar,
- Chinchadoli,
- Rasolpur,
- [[Barau]], Barau was conquered from Thaku Kusal Singh son of Thakur Jagram Singh and grandson of jhunjhar singh of gudha. He received his patrimony of
- Gura, founded in samwat 1805 by Thakur Balu Singh son of Thakur Roop Singh and grandson of Thakur Jhunjhar Singh of Gudha.
- Punkh,
- Kishorpura, Kishorpura named after Thakur Kishor Singh (son of Thakur Jhunjhar Singh of Gudha). He received his patrimony of Kishorpura.
- Nevari,
- Dippura,
- Chanwara,
- Chavsari,
- Badagaon,
- Kakrana,
- Kedh, in Samwat 1777, Kedh was conquered from Kaimkhani Nawab by

(Descendants of Thakur Salehdi Singh 1687–1767): Kedh, founded by Kunwar Gopal Singh son of Thakur Jagram Singh)

- Jakhal,
- Doodiya,
- Chapoli, Raja Jatan Singh Ji received his patrimony of Chhapoli. He was the son of Raja Bagh Singh Ji and grandson of Raja Jhunjhar Singh Ji of Gudha.
- Surpura Saray,
- Girawadi,
- Khoh, founded in last of 18th century by Thakur Balu Singh son of Thakur Roop Singh and grandson of Thakur Jhunjhar Singh of Gudha.
- Dhamora,
- Mandawara,
- Gothara,
- Mohanwari (Moonwari),
- Hukampura,
- BhojnagarLorada Lohargal
- Khudania

∗Titanwar.
