= Posana =

- Village
- Location in Rajasthan, India Posana (India)
- Coordinates: 27.8426°N 75.4783°E
- Country: India
- State: Rajasthan
- District: Jhunjhunu

Government
  - Sarpanch: Barji Devi

Area
  - Total: 6,000 km^{2} (2,300 sq mi)

Population
  - Total: 4,000 (apx)
  - Density: 0.67/km^{2} (1.7/sq mi)

Languages
  - Official: Hindi
- Time zone: UTC+5:30 (IST)
- PIN: 333022
- Telephone code: +911594
- ISO 3166 code: RJ-IN
- Vehicle registration: RJ-18
- Website: shekhawati.com

Posana is a village in Udaipurwati tehsil of Jhunjhunu district in the Indian state of Rajasthan.

== Location ==
Posana is situated at a distance of 39 km from Jhunjhunu in the south direction on Jhunjhunu-Jaipur state highway no.- 37 via Udaipurwati .

== Occupation ==
Main occupation of people is agriculture and government/private jobs. Some villagers are employed in government services land many people are doing private jobs in other states.

== Transport ==
Posana is connected to nearby villages through the road network with presence of State Transport Service and Private Bus Services which link it to Jhunjhunu, Udaipurwati, Sikar, Gudha Gorji, Nawalgarh, Neem-Ka-Thana & Khetri.

== Geography ==
Posana is located at 27.8426°N 75.4783°E.
