= Manaksas =

- Village
- Manaksas within the map of Rajasthan
- Coordinates: 26.92°N 75.8°E
- Country: India
- State: Rajasthan
- District: Jhunjhunu

Population
  - Total: 4,692
- Time zone: UTC+5:30 (IST)
- Pincode: 333801

The village of Manaksas is located in Udaipurwati Tehsil of Jhunjhunu in the Indian state of Rajasthan, bordered by the Aravali Hills.

== Population ==
According to the 2011 Indian Census, Manaksas has a population of around 4,692: 2,370 males and 2,322 females. The main resident castes in the village are Rajputs (Shekhawats), and Gurjars (Mankas). The village derives its name from the mankas clan of Gurjars.

Manaksas covers a large geographical area, and is the 18th most populated village within the Udaipurwati sub-district of Jhunjhunun district.

== See also ==
- Thikanas of Shekhawati
- Shekhawati
