= Badangarh =

- Village
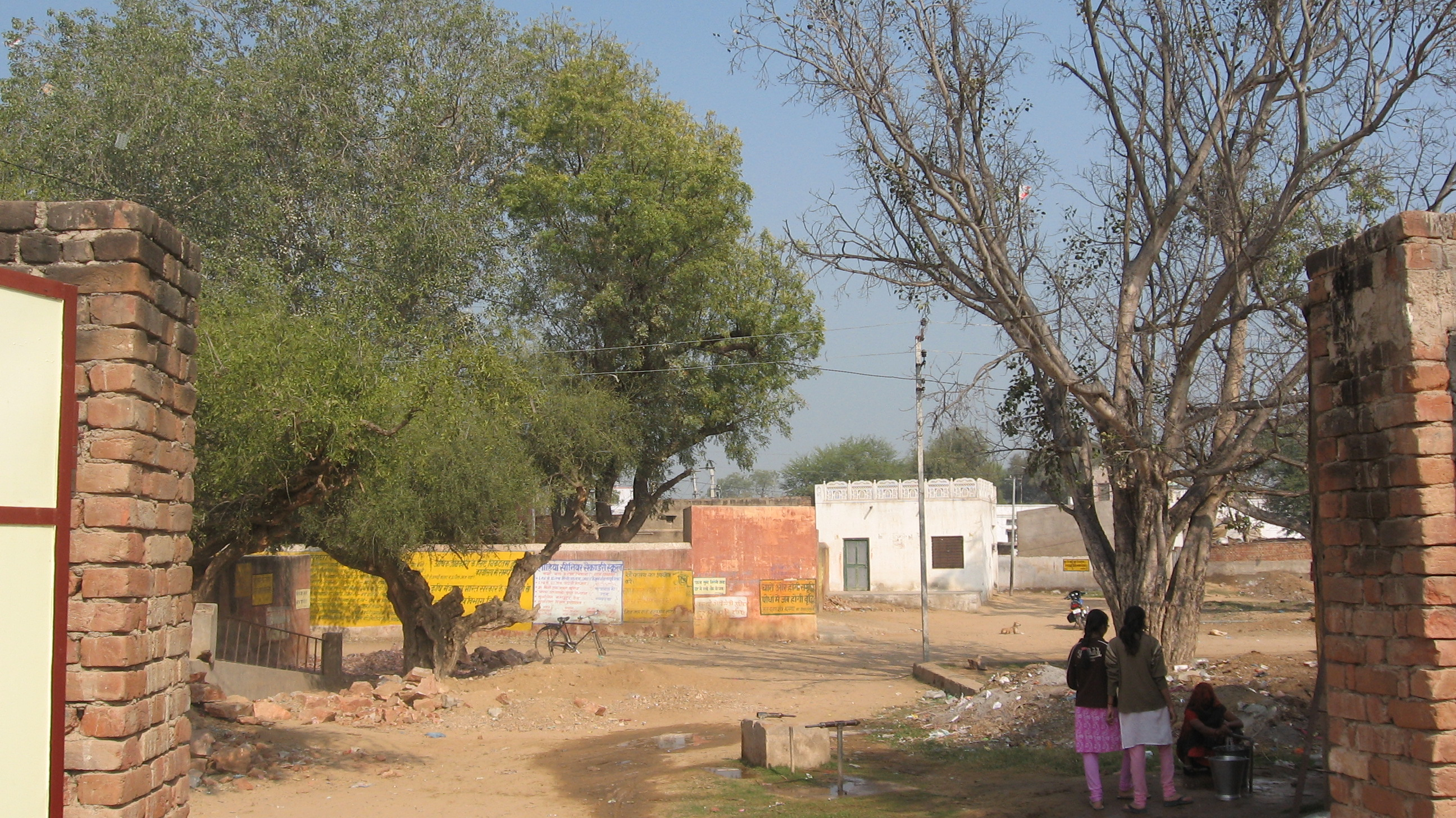

- Location in Rajasthan, India Badangarh (India)
- Coordinates: 28.22°N 75.36°E
- Country: India
- State: Rajasthan
- District: Jhunjhunu

Languages
  - Official: Hindi
- Time zone: UTC+5:30 (IST)
- PIN: 333035
- ISO 3166 code: RJ-IN
- Vehicle registration: RJ-18
- Nearest city: Pilani and Chirawa
- Lok Sabha constituency: Jhunjhunu
- Vidhan Sabha constituency: Pilani

Badangarh is a village near Chirawa in Jhunjhunu District, Rajasthan, state, India. It is bordered by Narhar to the east, Alampura to the west, Khudia to the south and Govali to the north.

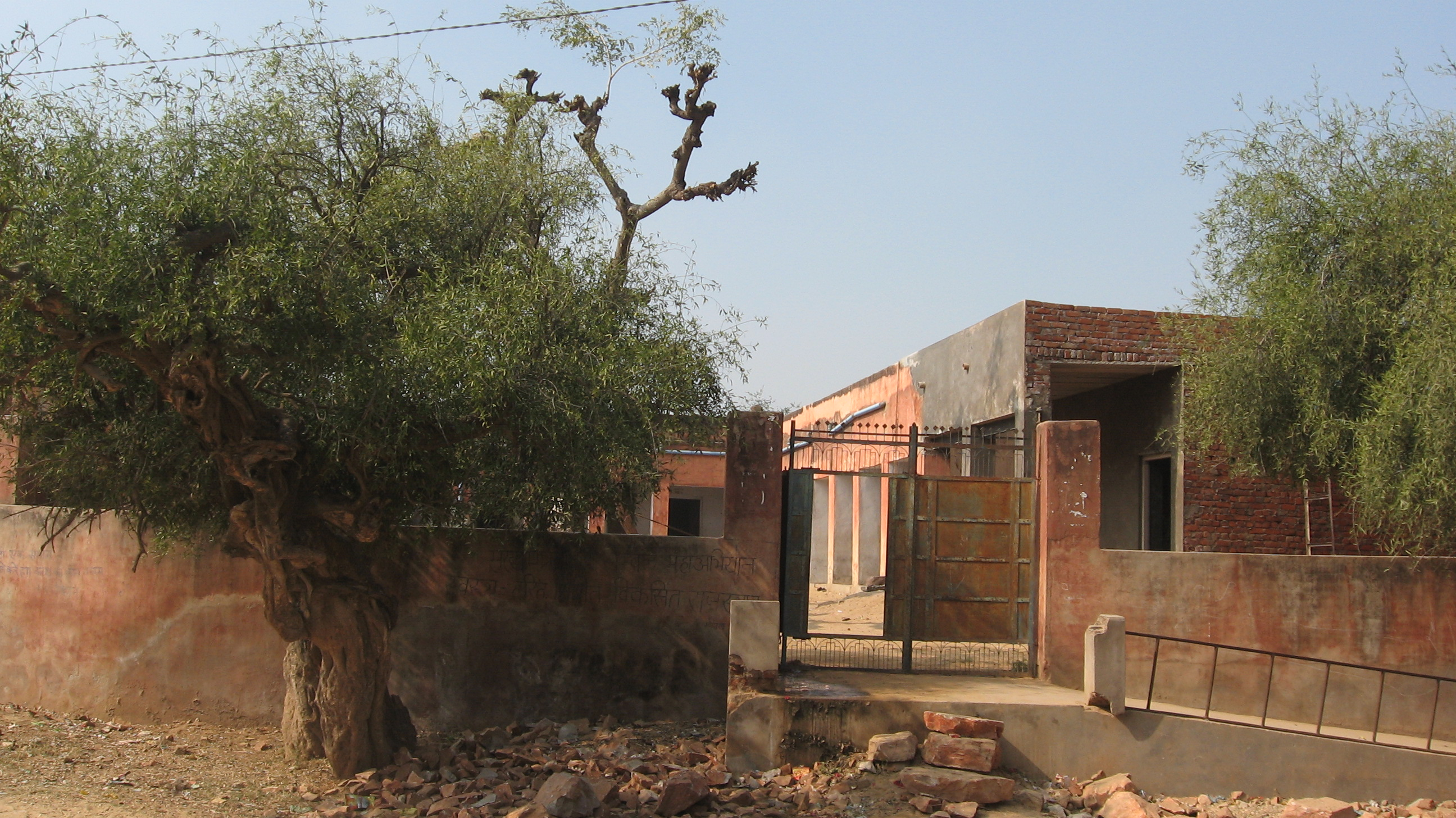
Badangarh School

== Sources ==
- National Panchayat Directory
