= Kumharon Ka Bass =

Kumharon Ka Bass is a village situated about 3.5 kilometres (2.2 mi) away from Surajgarh in the Jhunjhunu district of Rajasthan in India. Since 1938 all villagers have belonged to the same caste and are all related . According to local historical accounts and family records, the village was initially settled by Arjun Ram Khatiwal of Pichanva, who is regarded locally as the first Numberdar of the settlement. Arjun Ram Khatiwal and his family migrated from Pichanva and established their settlement in the area. His descendants, known as the Pichanva Khatiwals. Jalam, Birbalram and Nanak Jalindra came from Damoli and Berla, singhania (rajyora), kithania (bhatiwal), pichanawa (khatiwal), kakodia (manithia) are a part of Shekhawati region.

It has a population of around 1500 and nearly 80% of the people have the surname Kumawat, also known as Prajapat. Many of the villagers are farmers and many of the young people are serving in the Indian Army, the Airforce, as teachers or at masons. Many work in Jhunjhunu district or in foreign countries like Qatar, Oman, the United Arab Emirates, and Saudi Arabia.

The young children are involved tin education through a government school in the village.
