= Jalimpura =

Jalimpura also known as Charna ki dhani is a village in Bhimsar gram panchayat, Mandawa, Tehsil, Jhunjhunu district, Rajasthan, India. All resident of the village belongs to Jaat community ( Jhajharia, Dhaka, Tetarwal, Khedar, Godara ).

Village situated approximately 15 km from district headquarter Jhunjhunu and well connected by road from Jhunjhunu.

Neighbour village- Bhimsar, Rasora, sekhsar, Kumas, Naand ka Bas.(भीमसर, रसोड़ा, सेख सर, कुमास, नांद का बास )

Jalimpura is a medium size village located in Jhunjhunun Tehsil of Jhunjhunun district, Rajasthan with total 215 families residing. The Jalimpura village has population of 1028 of which 499 are males while 529 are females as per Population Census 2011.

In Jalimpura village population of children with age 0-6 is 123 which makes up 11.96% of total population of village. Average Sex Ratio of Jalimpura village is 1060 which is higher than Rajasthan state average of 928. Child Sex Ratio for the Jalimpura as per census is 864, lower than Rajasthan average of 888.

Jalimpura village has higher literacy rate compared to Rajasthan. In 2011, literacy rate of Jalimpura village was 68.29% compared to 66.11% of Rajasthan. In Jalimpura Male literacy stands at 84.06% while female literacy rate was 53.81%.
