= Mahapalwas =

Mahpalwas
- village
- Location in Rajasthan, India Mahpalwas (India)
- Coordinates: 28°20′03″N 75°53′00″E
- Country: India
- State: Rajasthan
- District: Jhunjhunu

Languages
  - Official: Hindi
- Time zone: UTC+5:30 (IST)
- PIN: 333033
- Vehicle registration: RJ-18
- Coastline: 0 kilometres (0 mi)
- Nearest city: Surajgarh, Loharu,(Haryana) Satnali(Haryana)

Mahapalwas is a medium village in Jhunjhunu district in Rajasthan.

== Geography ==
Mahapalwas is located at 28.334° N 75.883° E.

== Demographics ==
As of 2001 India census, Mahapalwas had a population of 1,738 constituting 277 households. Males constitute 52% of the population and females 48%. Mahapalwas has an average literacy rate of 62%, higher than the national average of 59.5%: male literacy is 73%, and female literacy is 50%. In Mahapalwas, 17% of the population is under 6 years of age.
