= Dhanuri =

Dhanuri village in Rajasthan

Dhanuri is a village in Malsisar Tehsil in Jhunjhunu District of Rajasthan State, India. Dhanuri village is located in Malsisar Tehsil of Jhunjhunun district in Rajasthan, India. It is situated at 15 kilometer from Jhunjhunun, which is district headquarter of Dhanuri village. Dhanuri is known for the most no of Martyrs per capita in India. Majority of the population is of Kayamkhani caste of converted Muslims from Chauhan Rajputs. As per 2009 stats, Dhanuri village is also a gram panchayat.

== Population of Dhanuri village ==
According to Census 2011, Dhanuri's population is 3454. Out of this, 1644 are males whereas the females count 1810 here. This village has 569 kids in the age bracket of 0–6 years. Out of this 279 are boys and 290 are girls.

== Literacy rate of Dhanuri village ==
Literacy ratio in Dhanuri village is 60%. 2086 out of total 3454 population is literate in the village. Among males the literacy rate is 71% as 1179 males out of total 1644 are literate while female literacy rate is 50% as 907 out of total 1810 females are educated in this Village. The dark part is that illiteracy ratio of Dhanuri village is 39%. At the village, 1368 out of total 3454 persons are illiterate. Male illiteracy rate here is 28% as 465 males out of total 1644 are uneducated. Among the females the illiteracy ratio is 49% and 903 out of total 1810 females are illiterate in this village.
