= Bavaliya Baba =

Hindu saint

- बावलिया बाबा
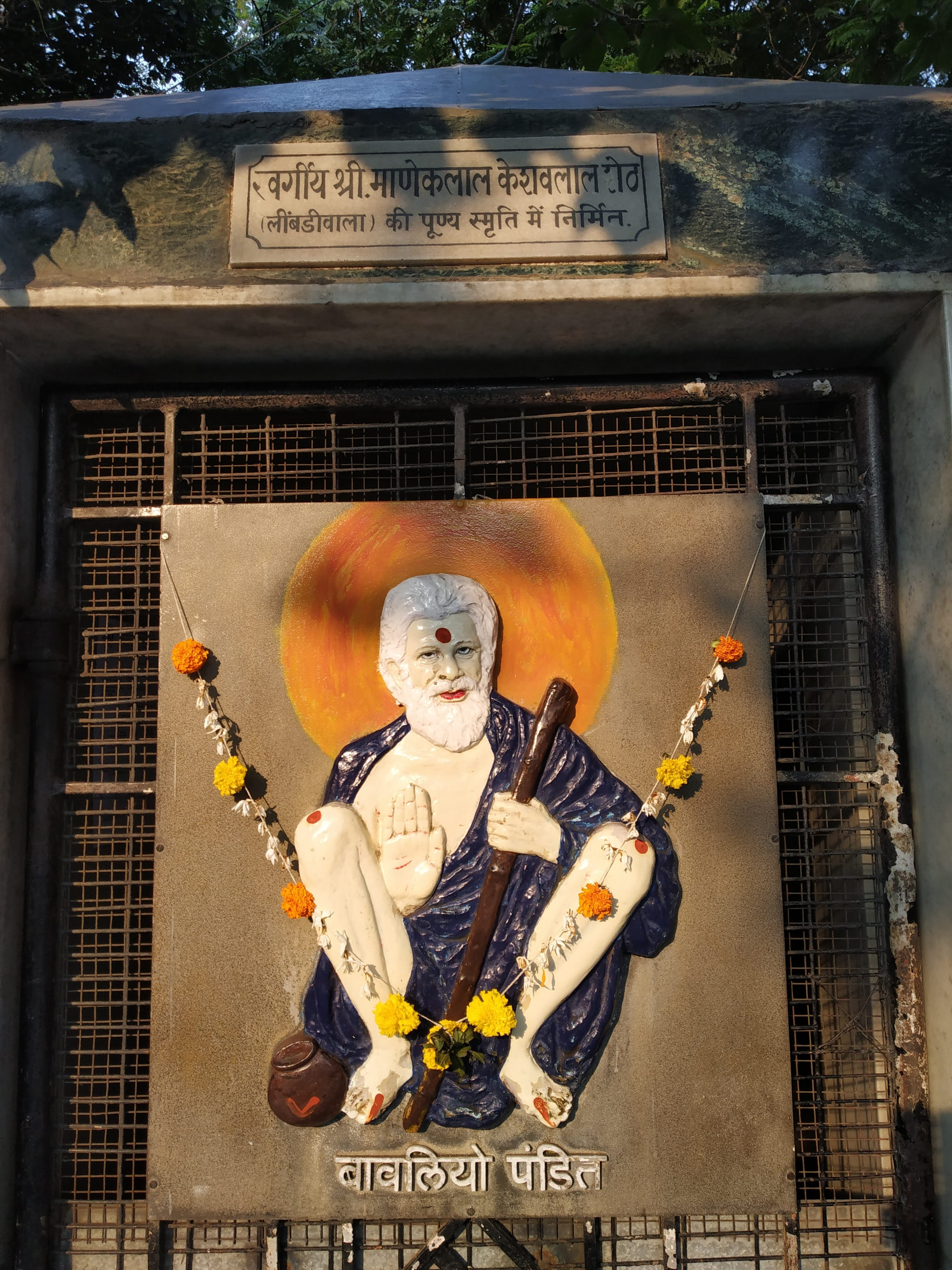
- Bavaliya Baba

Personal life
- Born: Ganesh Narayan; 1847 Bugala village (present-day in Jhunjhunu district, Shekhawati, Rajasthan)
- Died: 1913 (aged 65–66)
- Parent(s): Ghan Shyamdas (father); Gauradevi (mother)
- Other name: Bavaliya Pandit

Religious life
- Religion: Hinduism
- Sect: Aghori

Bavaliya Baba, also known as Paramahansa Ganesh Narayan and Bavaliya Pandit (1847–1913), was an Indian Hindu saint associated with the Aghori sect.

== Life ==
He was born as Ganesh Narayan in Bugala village, Jhunjhunu district, Shekhawati, in Vikram Samvat 1903 on the first day of the Poush month (according to the Hindu calendar). He was born into a Brahmin family to Ghan Shyamdas and Gauradevi. He learned the Persian language at a young age. In 1947, he moved to Chirawa city and embraced the Aghori sect. He worshipped Goddess Durga and recited her mantra regularly.

At a young age, he attained spiritual achievements through his dedication to meditation and devotion. His miraculous deeds have been acknowledged and praised nationwide. Considered a revered saint in the Shekhawati region of Rajasthan, Bavaliya Baba spent most of his life in Chirawa, where he fully embraced the Aghori way of life.

People who followed Bavaliya Baba saw him perform miracles, which inspired them to become devoted followers. He was recognized as a true ascetic, but some regarded him as a madman, earning him the epithet Bavaliya Pandit (mad Brahmin). Throughout his life, Bavaliya Baba remained predominantly in Chirawa, where he adopted the complete Aghori form. He continued to chant the Durga mantra, which was believed to emanate truth every time it was spoken from his mouth.

His ability to perform miracles brought many followers, while others were afraid of his predictions of terrible future In Chirawa and Bugala, people worship him as the village deity (Gramadevata).

He died during a yogic practice on the ninth day of the Paush month in Samvat in 1969. A temple has been constructed at his cremation site, where a grand statue of him is placed.

Some of his notable devotees include Jugal Kishore Birla of the Birla family and Ajit Singh of Khetri.

== Temples ==
The temples dedicated to him have been established in many places in India. Bugala, Nawalgarh, Gudhagorji, and Chirawa are major pilgrimage sites associated with him. There are temples of Bavaliya Baba in places such as Khetri Nagar, Pilani, Mukundgarh, Banswara, Ghoriwara, Bas Nanag, Kuchaman , Kolkata, Hyderabad, Ahmedabad, Gwalior, and Mumbai.

The samadhi (resting place of a saint) of Bavaliya Baba is located in Chirawa, Jhunjhunu district, Rajasthan, and is considered a site of local religious significance.

Jugal Kishore Birla constructed a ghat in his memory in 1959 and also erected a tall stupa named Ganesh Lat.

== Museum ==
His family home in Bugala village has been converted into a museum, which is managed by the Bavaliya Baba Memorial Trust in Mumbai and curated by experts. The museum displays artifacts related to Baba's life and teachings.

== In popular culture ==
A Rajasthani language film titled Bavaliyo Pandit has been produced based on his life.
