= Sehar (disambiguation) =

Sehar is a 2005 Indian crime drama film.

Sehar may also refer to:

- Sehar, Bhiwani, a village in Haryana, India
- Sehar Broadcasting Network, a Pakistani Urdu-language television channel

== Given name ==
- Sehar Fejzulahi (born 1985), Swiss footballer
- Sehar Kamran, Pakistani politician
- Seher Kaya (born 2010) Turkish swimmer
- Sehar Khan, Pakistani actress and model
- Seher Tokmak (born 1999), Turkish sports shooter
