= Netrampura =

Coordinates: 28°19′N 75°48′E

Netrampura is a village in the Surajgarh municipality in Rajasthan, India. It is a village of Jats of the Bijarnia clan. Netrampura was founded by Netram Bijarnia. It is commonly also called as Netram ki Dhani

As of 2005, the village counted 120 households (100% of which were using electricity) and featured a primary school of eight grades. The road network consists of earth roads only.

Most inhabitants of the village work in the Indian army.
