= Papurana, Jhunjhunu =

Papurana
- village
- Location in Rajasthan, India Papurana (India)
- Coordinates: 28°19′N 75°39′E
- Country: India
- State: Rajasthan
- Founder: Maharaja Pipaji Nirban
- Named for: Founder

Population (2011)
  - Total: 5,500

Languages
  - Official: Hindi
- Time zone: UTC+5:30 (IST)
- Postal code: 333037
- ISO 3166 code: RJ-IN
- Vehicle registration: RJ

Papurana is a village situated in Jhunjhunu district in Rajasthan, India. It is located in the Khetri tehsil, 9.9 km from the tehsil headquarters Khetri. Papurana is 80 km from the district headquarters Jhunjhunun, and 108 km from the state capital Jaipur. There is a Shakti temple in the village.

== Demographics ==
Other villages in Khetri Mandal are Khetri, Barau, Basai, Charawas, Dalelpura, Dudhwa Nanglia, Nearby Villages of this Village with distance are Babai (6.8 km), Gadrata (8.4 km), Sihor (8.9 km), Hardiya (9.5 km), Tyonda (10.7 km),. Nearby towns are Khetri (14.9 km), Buhana (34.5 km), Udaipurwati (39.9 km), Chirawa (43.6 km)
