= Vidyavihar, Rajasthan =

Vidyavihar
- Country: India
- State: Rajasthan
- District: Jhunjhunu

Population (2001)
  - Total: 14,366

Languages
  - Official: Hindi
- Time zone: UTC+5:30 (IST)
- ISO 3166 code: RJ-IN
- Vehicle registration: RJ-

Vidyavihar is a town and a municipality in the Jhunjhunu district in the Indian state of Rajasthan.

== Demographics ==
As of 2001 India census, Vidyavihar had a population of 14,366. Males constitute 60% of the population and females 40%. Vidyavihar has an average literacy rate of 83%, higher than the national average of 59.5%: male literacy is 89%, and female literacy is 74%. In Vidyavihar, 8% of the population is under 6 years of age.
