= Jhajhar =

- Village
- Location in Rajasthan, India Jhajhar (India)
- Coordinates: 27.86°N 75.28°E
- Country: India
- State: Rajasthan
- District: Jhunjhunu
- Elevation: 379 m (1,243 ft)

Languages
  - Official: Hindi
- Time zone: UTC+5:30 (IST)
- PIN: 333 304
- Telephone code: 91-1594
- ISO 3166 code: RJ-IN
- Vehicle registration: RJ-18

Jhajhar is a village, Jhajhar is located in the Jhunjhunu District, Rajasthan, India. approximately 7 km from Nawalgarh. Formally it was the part of Pentalisa of Bhojyana.
