= Bagholi =

- Village
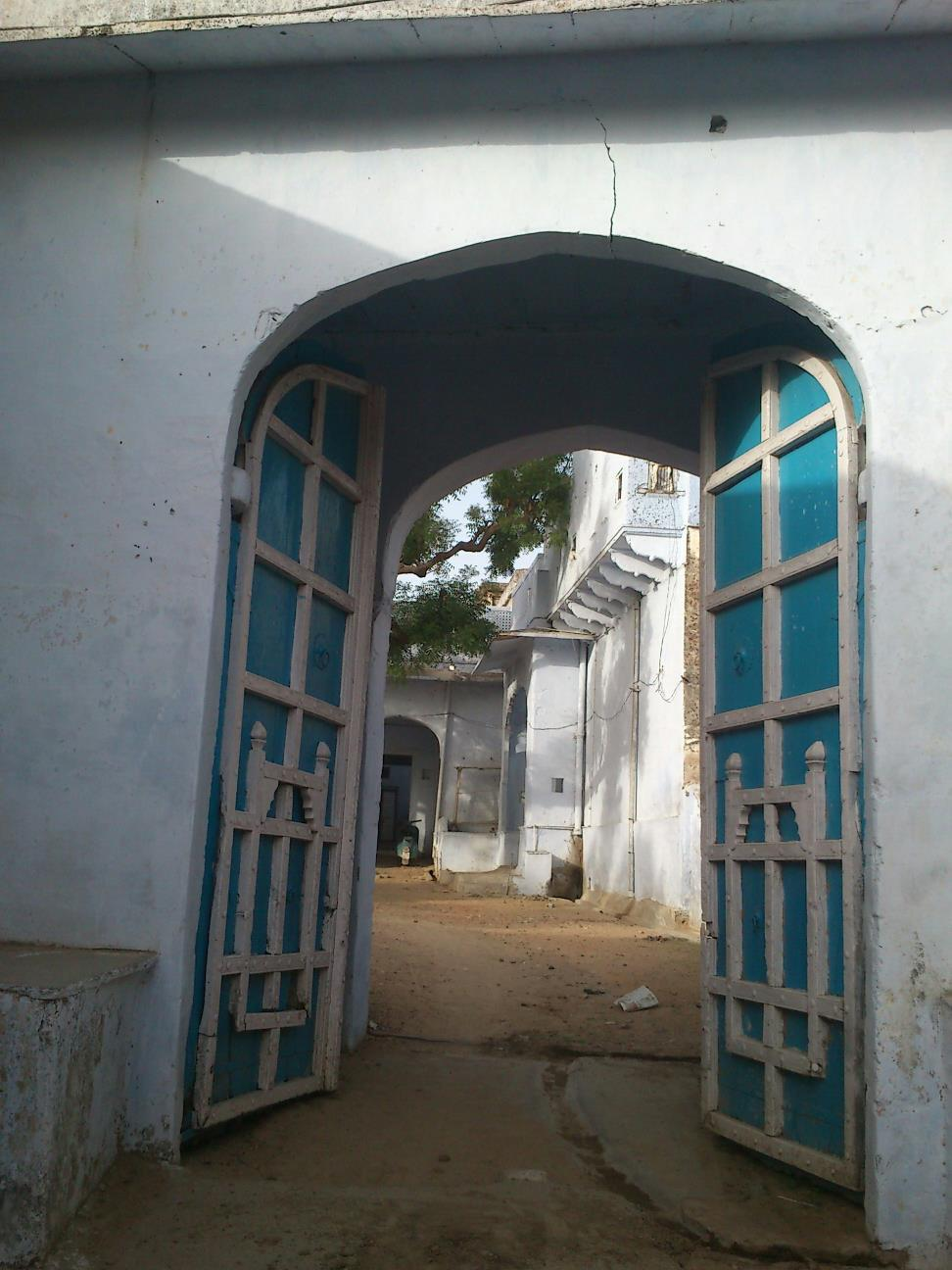
- Phool Singh Ji Ki Haveli, Bagholi

- Bagholi within the map of Rajasthan
- Coordinates: 27.770102°N 75.679594°E
- Country: India
- State: Rajasthan
- District: Jhunjhunu district
- Time zone: UTC+5:30 (IST)

Bagholi is a village located in Jhunjhunu district, Rajasthan, India. It is within a locally self-governing Scheduled Area.

The village has the area's first electrical grid and provides water to the villages and nearby khetri (English: copper mines).

== See also ==
- Thikanas of Shekhawati
- Shekhawati
