= Sohansara =

- village
- Nickname: Sawn
- Location in Haryana, India Sohansara (India)
- Coordinates: 28.41°N 75.86°E
- Country: India
- State: Haryana
- District: Bhiwani
- Elevation: 294 m (965 ft)

Population (2011)
  - Total: 6,521

Languages
  - Official: Hindi
- Time zone: UTC+5:30 (IST)
- PIN: 127201
- Telephone code: 91-1252
- Vehicle registration: Loharu(HR18)
- Website: bhiwani.gov.in

Sohansara is a village in the Bhiwani district of the Indian state of Haryana. Part of the Loharu constituency, it is located 8 kilometres (5.0 mi) from the city of Loharu, 14.5 kilometres (9.0 mi) from Badhra and 64 kilometres (40 mi) from the district headquarters.For political representational purposes the village is part of Loharu Assembly constituency and the Bhiwani-Mahendragarh Lok Sabha constituency.

== Village Panchayat ==
=== Village Sarpanch ===
No	Name	Term
1	Pt. Ramkuwar	1952-1957
2	Thakur Daan Singh	1957-62
3	Pt. Ramkuwar	1962-66
4	Thakur Daan Singh	1966-71
5	Pt. Ramkuwar	1971-76
6	Thakur Phool Singh	1976-81
7	Pt. Ramkuwar	1981-86
8	Thakur Rampal Singh	1986-91
9	Shri Mahaveer Parsad	1991-94
10	Thakur Rampal Singh	1994-99
11	Deepak	2000-05
12	Smt. Muni Devi	2005-10
13	Shri Bhagrith Singh	2010-16
14	Capt. Randhir Singh	2016-22
15	Rajkumar	2022-till

== Transport ==
Sohansara railway station is on the Rewari – Mahendragarh – Satnali – Loharu – Sadulpur – Churu – Bikaner – Degana – Jodhpur broad gauge railway line. Local roads connect to Loharu, Satnali, Mahendergarh and Rewari. Sohansara - dhani dhola - Gagarwas-ch.dadari. Sohansara- kuloth--surajgarh - Jaipur.

== Religious sites ==
=== Temple ===
- Baba Bhomiya Temple
- Nanu Shakti Temple
- Thakur Ji Jaal Wala Temple
- Hanuman Ji Temple
- Maa Shera Wali Temple
- Baba Sultan Natha Temple
- Baba Prakash Puri Ji Maharaj Temple
- Sedh Mata Mandir

== Education ==
=== Government School ===
- Government Senior Secondary School
- Government Model Sanskarti Primary school

=== Private School ===
- M L M Senior Secondary School
- SDM Middle School
- Shiksha Vikas Sr. Sec. School
