= Sehar, Bhiwani =

Sehar is a Jat dominant village located in Loharu Tehsil of Bhiwani district in Haryana, India. It is situated 25 km from sub-district headquarters Loharu and 60 km from district headquarter Bhiwani. Sehar is a gram panchayat. Loharu is nearest town to Sehar. Pilani, Rajgarh Churu, Bhiwani, Mahendragarh are the cities near Sehar. This place is in the border of the Bhiwani District and Jhunjhunu District.

About 289 houses are present, most owned by Hindu families.
