= Rani Sati =

Woman who committed sati

Rani Sati, also identified as Narayani Devi and referred to as Dadiji (grandmother), is said to be a Rajasthani woman who lived sometime between the 13th and the 17th century and committed sati (self-immolation) on her husband's death. Various temples in Rajasthan and elsewhere are devoted to her worship and to commemorate her act.

== Legends ==
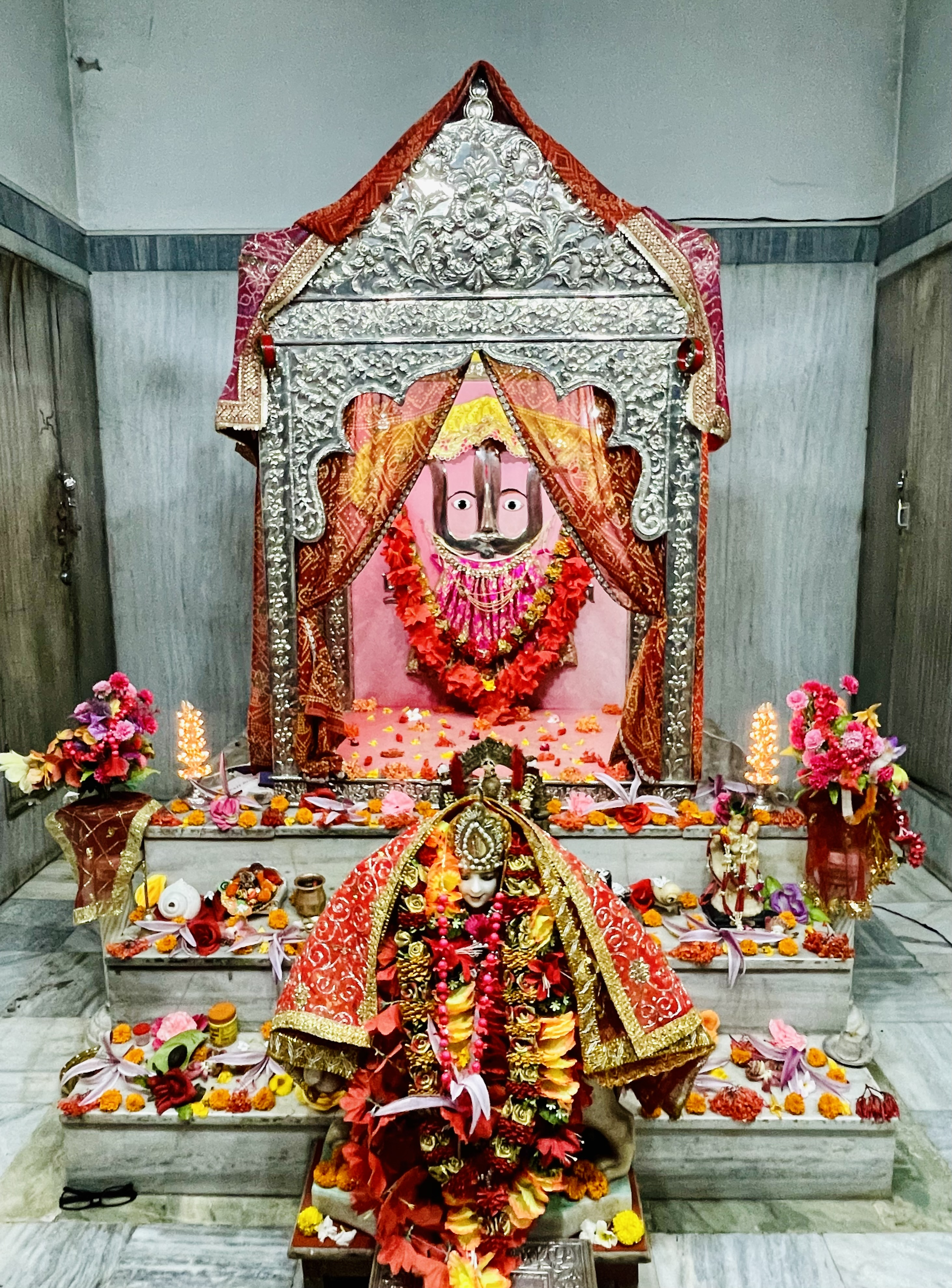
Rani Sati Temple at Radha Krishna Mandir, Dibrugarh Complex

The accounts of Rani Sati's life and the events leading to her death vary widely. Her death has been dated to 1295 or 1595 in some re-tellings, while others place her in the 14th century, or even the 17th century. One such legend, recounted by Sakuntala Narsimhan, says:

[Rani] was a seventeen-year-old girl of the Bania caste. The legend is that the nawab coveted the white mare that her betrothed rode on, and in the confrontation that ensued, [Rani's husband] Tandhan Das was killed, leaving his faithful servant as the only survivor apart from Dadi Narayani Devi, and her mare. When the servant asked her whether he should take her back to her father's or to her father-in-law's, she is said to have replied that she would become a sati and wherever the horse stopped while carrying the ashes of the couple, a temple to their memory should be raised.

Another version of the legend, as related by Anne Hardgrove, says:

..., on one day about six hundred years ago a fourteen-year-old Hindu bride named Narayani Devi was coming home for the first time with her husband (of the Jalan lineage) just after their marriage. Her husband worked as a merchant in Jhunjhunu. Muslim invaders suddenly attacked her husband and his companions, brutally killing them. Only Narayani Devi and (in some versions) a loyal servant named "Rana" survived the attack. According to the story, Narayani Devi then bravely burned herself to death by spontaneously bursting into flames to avoid being captured and kidnapped by these invaders.

Other accounts ascribe the killing of her husband to a band of dacoits, and say that Rani died by the same hand in trying to defend her honour. Yet other versions regard Rani as the first of thirteen widows in her Jalan family to commit sati.

== Worship and temples ==
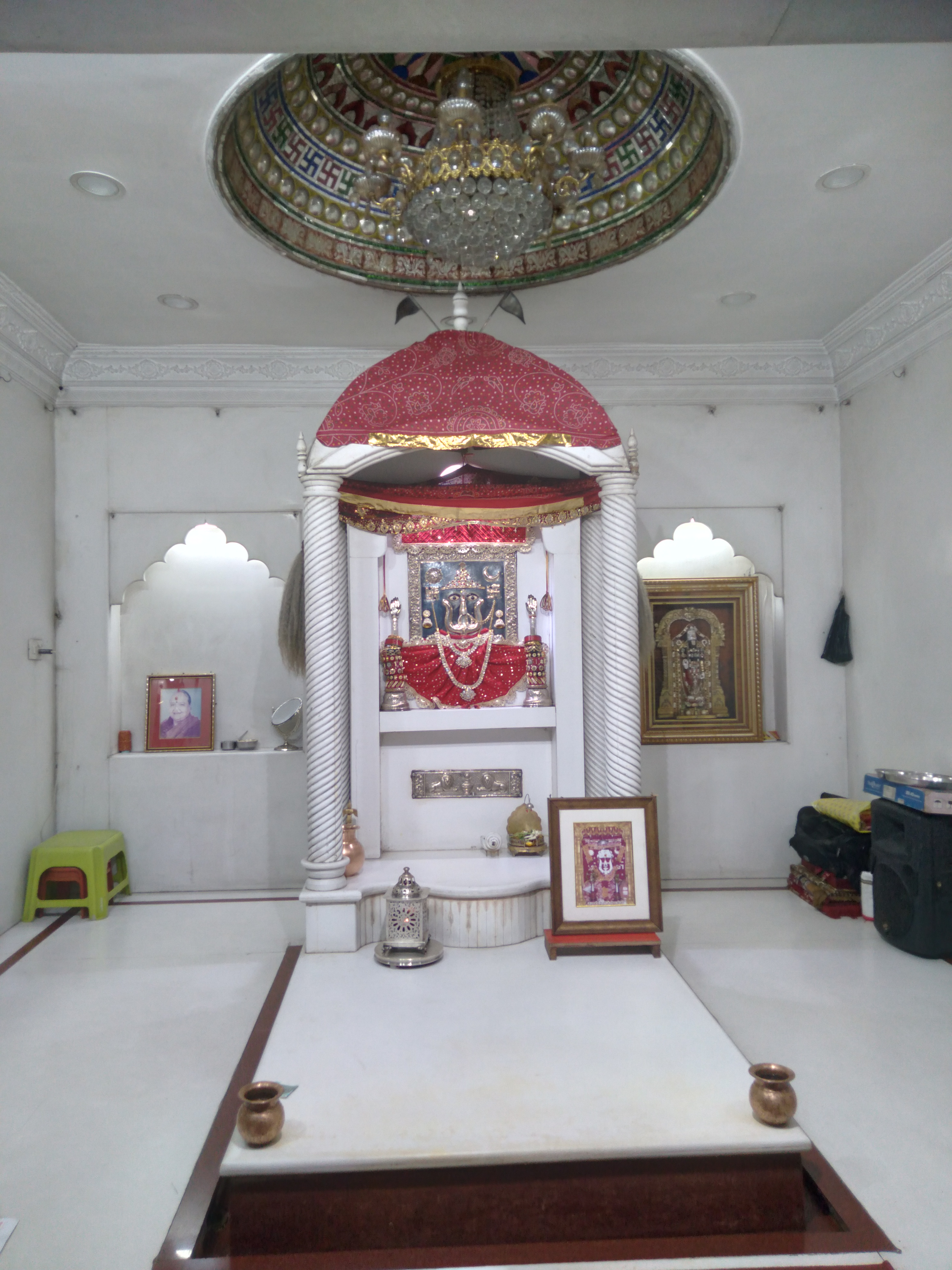
Rani Sati Dadi

Several temples in India, especially in the North Western state of Rajasthan, are devoted to Rani Sati and her act of sati. There are numerous other Sati temples in the region including Narayani Sati in Alwar, Dholan Sati in Raipur and Rani Bhatiyani in Jasol. Sati worship had been common in these regions, Banarasidas in his Ardhakathanaka (1643), mentions his family visiting the sati shrine associated with his clan. Though veneration of Rani Sati and patronage of these temples cut across caste, regional and even religious lines, they are particularly prevalent amongst the merchant Marwari community, and its Agrawal sub-caste. Members of those communities have funded the construction of Rani Sati temples, and transformed her status from a kuldevi (family deity) to a Goddess subject to public worship.

The most prominent of these shrines is the Rani Sati Temple Jhunjhunu in the Shekhavati region of Rajasthan, administered and attracting a large following from Kolkata. The temple was inaugurated in 1912, and started off as a set of simple memorial mounds. Construction of a larger complex began in 1917, financed by donations from the Jalan clan of the Agarwal community, and was completed in 1936. As of today, the temple is a monumental complex with a multi-storey structure, a main hall made of marble, and dual courtyards surrounded by rooms that can house up to 300 pilgrims. Rani Sati herself is represented by a trident, and considered a manifestation of the Goddess Shakti. In the sanctum, there is a depiction of Rani Sati surrounded by Ganesha, Shiva and Durga, while a wall frieze recounts the events leading to her husband's death, her self-immolation, and the subsequent construction of the temple itself. The temple is said to have an annual income of Rupees twenty lakhs and assets of Rupees eighty lakhs. The temple trustees also organize a well-attended annual fair to celebrate Rani Sati. There are other Sati shrines belonging to other satis in the same family in the compound. There are other Sati temples in Jhunjhunu belonging to other communities.

A Rajasthani movie Laj Rakho Rani Sati was released in 1973.

Perhaps the oldest existing Rani Sati temple outside Jhunjhunu dates to 1837 and is located at Kankurgachi in Kolkata. Hundreds of other Rani Sati temples are located in Bombay, Delhi, Varanasi, Kolkata, Hyderabad and other places in India, as well as in Rangoon, Bangkok, Singapore, Hong Kong, Japan and the United States. On 1 December 1980, a public procession taken out by Rani Sati devotees in New Delhi to celebrate the construction of a new Rani Sati temple in the city was protested against by feminists and those opposed to the practice of sati. This led to discussions in both houses of the Indian Parliament over promotion of the practice of sati, and Prime Minister of India Indira Gandhi halted construction of the new temple, calling satipuja (worship of satis) a "barbaric medieval, and illegal" practice.

In 1996, many of Rani Sati devotees celebrated the 400th anniversary of her supposed birthday on 4 December, including at a large public yagna near the temple at Jhunjhunu (the date was possibly picked in tacit protest of the formal banning of sati in Bengal Presidency by Lord Lord William Bentinck on 4 December 1829.)

On 20 November 2015 it's been marked as 734 Birthday of Dadi Rani Sati

== Roop Kanwar controversy ==
The practice of worshiping satis has often been subject of controversy in India, and the Rani Sati Temple at Jhunjhunu came under particularly harsh spot-light when an 18-year widow Roop Kanwar (who was reported to be a devotee of Rani Sati) committed sati in 1987 in the nearby town of Deorala. Following Kanwar's immolation, the Indian government issued an order proscribing the 'glorification of Sati', and tried banning the annual fair at Jhunjhunu. The Calcutta High Court lifted the ban, and on appeal, the Supreme Court of India modified it to allow worship of Rani Sati within the temple while forbidding the celebration of her sati through the chunari ceremonies in which brides seek the Goddess's blessings by offering her their bridal veils. The court also disallowed the fair, which is held on the temple's outer grounds. However the controversy and court decisions, brought even greater attention to the town of Deorala and the Rani Sati temple, and attracted thousands of pilgrims to the temple and the fair that year. Elsewhere in India, while many Rani Sati temples halted their public celebrations soon after Roop Kanwar's death, their activities resumed within a few years.
