= Loharu Fort =

Coordinates: 28°25′49″N 75°48′27″E

- Interactive map of the Loharu Fort area

General information
- Status: State protected monument
- Type: Fort
- Architectural style: Combination of Rajput, Mughal and British colonial
- Location: Loharu, Haryana, India
- Completed: 1570 CE

Loharu Fort, built in 16th century, is a state protected archaeological monument in Loharu town in Haryana state of India. Fort is part of interstate Shekhawati region which lies on either side of Haryana-Rajasthan border in the sandy bagar tract.

== History ==
After its foundation in 1570 CE, the control of Loharu fort passed from Shekhawati rulers to Alwar State, then to British Raj who gave Loharu State as a jagir to Nawab Ahmed Baksh Khan. The Nawab of Loharu finally sold it to the Government of Haryana (GoH) in 1971.

=== Under Shekhawati State ===
==== Foundation ====
In 1570 CE, Arjun Singh, thakur of Loharu constructed a mud fort at Loharu, which remained a kaccha mud fort till 1800. Arjun Singh was a descendant of Loharu's founder, Rao Narhar Das.

Rao Shekha, the Shekhawat Kachhwaha rajput ruler of Shekhawati, had originally divided Shekhawati into 33 thikanas, of which Loharu Fort was 33rd.

==== First battle of Loharu (1671 CE) ====
There have been 2 major battles fought over Loharu Fort. The first battle of Loharu was fought in 1671 CE between Madan Singh of Loharu Thikana and the Mughal Governor of Hisar over former's refusal to pay the land revenue to Mughals during the reign of Aurangzeb (r. 1658–1707).

==== Second battle of Loharu (~1770s CE) ====
The second battle of Loharu was fought, some time around or after 1770s CE, between the Kirat Singh of Loharu Thikana and Bhopal Singh of Khetri Thikana of Jaipur State, who claimed Loharu as part of Khetri. Bhopal Singh was killed in the battle outside Loharu Fort, and a commemorative chhatri was built at the place where he was cremated, which is located nearly 1 km from the fort.

=== Under Alwar State ===
The control of the fort later passed to Alwar State.

=== Under British raj: Nawab of Loharu State ===
In 1803, British gave Loharu and pargana of Ferozepur Jhirka to the Nawab Ahmed Baksh Khan of Loharu State, a princely state under company raj, who then converted the mud fort into a pucca (brick and masonry) fort. Urdu poet Mirza Ghalib was married to "Umrao Begum", niece of Loharu's Nawab, Ahmad Bakhsh Khan, and daughter of his younger brother, Mirza Ilahi Bakhsh Khan.

=== After 1947 independence of India ===
In 1971, then nawabs of Loharu, Aminuddin Ahmed Khan sold it to the Government of Haryana.

In 2021, GoH announced that the fort will be given the status of a state protected monument.

== Architecture ==
The Loharu Fort is built on 64 kanal and 18 marla, which is nearly eight acres. Present fort was built by Nawab Ahmed Baksh Khan in 1803 to replace the earlier Shekhwati mud fort constructed in 1570. The present fort combines three styles of architecture, Rajput, Mughal and British colonial.

The Government of Haryana notification about the protected status for the fort states,

"The south-wing of the fort contained the Diwan-e-khas (special royal hall) and the Sheesh Mahal or The Room Of Mirrors, which has Mughal/Rajput style details. The central part of the south wing contained a large Victorian style audience chamber and banquet hall. The right side of the south-wing consisted of the Zanana Mahal along with the kitchens. The left side of the south-wing was purely Mughal architecture. The east-wing was executed in the Delhi Haveli style which was considered very fashionable at the time and was distinct from the Shekhawati Haveli".[1]

== Conservation ==
Since 1971, after being sold to the government of Haryana, the fort remained uninhabited, all of the north-wing collapsed and so did a part of the east-wing. Only the south-wing of the fort (containing the Farukh Manzil) survives in a dilapidated state.

In August 2021, Government of Haryana announced that after being given a State protected monument status, the fort will be conserved and developed into a tourist attraction. The details of the subsequent conservation project efforts are awaited by the civic society.

In 2025, Haryana government announced a INR 95 crore restoration plan for upgrade of 20 monuments across the state including the Loharu Fort.

== See also ==
- List of State Protected Monuments in Haryana
- List of Monuments of National Importance in Haryana
- Tourism in Haryana
- Tourism in India
- Shekhawati region
- Bagar tract
