= Bhojgarh =

Bhojgarh is a village in the Shekhawati region of Rajasthan, India. It is located in Jhunjhunu district. Bhojgarh is connected by road, and can be reached by car or bus from Gudha, Jhunjhunu, Jaipur or Udaipurwati. The Village is about 10 km from Gudha gorji, 40 km from Jhunjhunu and 150 km from Jaipur. Bhojgarh was founded by shekhawat . Number of its residents serves in Indian Army, Indian Airforce and Paramilitary Forces. However, the farming is the main occupation for the most of Bhojgarh residents. The main crops in the monsoon seasons are Bajara (Pearl Millet), Moth, and Guar. The main crops in the winter months are Wheat, Barley, Sarson ( Mustard seed), and Chana.
