= Rani Sati Temple =

Rani Sati Dadi Temple
- Main entrance of temple

- Location of Rani Sati Temple in Jhunjhunu, Rajasthan Rani Sati Temple (India)

Religion
- Affiliation: Hinduism
- District: Jhunjhunu
- Festival: Varshika Puja

Location
- State: Rajasthan
- Country: India
- Coordinates: 28°8′7″N 75°24′13″E

Website
- www.dadisati.in

Rani Sati Temple is a Hindu temple situated in Jhunjhunu, Jhunjhunu district, in the state of Rajasthan, India. It is the largest temple in India devoted to Rani Sati, a Rajasthani lady who lived sometime between the 13th and the 17th century and committed sati (self-immolation) on her husband's death. Various temples in Rajasthan and elsewhere are devoted to her worship and to commemorate her act. Rani Sati is also called Narayani Devi and referred to as Dadiji (grandmother).

== History ==
The story of Rani Sati Dadi Maa starts from the time of Mahabharata. The young and heroic warrior, Abhimanyu, was killed by the Kauravas on the battlefield by using unethical methods, when he was unarmed. Abhimanyu's wife Uttara was shocked and distraught to hear of her husband's death. As a Hindu wife, Uttara was devoted to her husband and, upon hearing of his death, wanted to ascend his funeral pyre and commit Sati. She stated her intention of joining her husband in death and in the hereafter. While the act of Sati is held to be meritorious in the highest degree, the elders of her family told her that Sati at this point would be sinful rather than meritorious. This was because Uttara was pregnant at this time, and a pregnant woman committing Sati is against Dharma, they said.

Shree Krishna, who was divinity personified, was also Abhimanyu's maternal uncle. He told Uttara that harming an unborn child is an unforgivable sin and she should accept that committing Sati was not in her destiny in this lifetime. Uttara accepted that, as a pregnant woman, she would be sinning if she committed Sati, and therefore she must continue to live as a widow. It was a bitter prospect for Uttara, a young woman who had lived her youth so happily with such a heroic young man, to now live a long life with only the memory of such a glorious husband. Uttara agreed not to end her life, and sought a blessing from Shree Krishna: that she be married to Abhimanyu in every future lifetime, and that she either live throughout every lifetime as a Suhaagan, or, if it ever be in her destiny to be again widowed, she be spared the additional sorrow of life without her husband; she asked that she be able to attain the venerable status of Sati at least in that future lifetime. Shree Krishna granted her the boon she sought.

In a future lifetime, Uttara was born as the daughter of Gursamal Birmewal in the village of Dokwa in present-day Rajasthan, and was named Narayani. Abhimanyu was born in Hissar in present-day Haryana as a son of Jaliram Jalan, and was named Tandhan Jalan. Both of them were born into the Agarwal subcaste of the trading (Bania) caste. Tandhan and Narayani were duly married to each other at a very young age and were leading a peaceful life. Tandhan was in possession of a beautiful horse which was being eyed by the son of the king of Hissar for quite some time. Tandhan refused to hand over his precious horse to the king's son. The king's son then decides to forcefully acquire the horse and thus challenges Tandan to a duel. Tandan fights the battle bravely and kills the king's son. The enraged king then kills Tandan in front of Narayani in the battle. Narayani, symbolic of female bravery and power, fights with the king and kills him. She then commanded Ranaji (the caretaker of the horse) to make immediate arrangements for her to be set ablaze along with her husband's cremation. Ranaji, playing a vital role in fulfilling her wish to be sati with her husband, is then blessed by Narayani that his name will be taken and worshiped along with her name and since then she is known as Rani Sati.

The accounts of Rani Sati's life and the events leading to her death vary widely. Her death has been dated to 1295 or 1595 in some re-tellings, while others place her in the 14th century, or even the 17th century. One such legend, recounted by Sakuntala Narsimhan, says:

[Rani] was a seventeen-year-old girl of the Bania caste. The legend is that the nawab coveted the white mare that her betrothed rode on, and in the confrontation that ensued, [Rani's husband] Tandhan Das was killed, leaving his faithful servant as the only survivor apart from Dadi Narayani Devi, and her mare. When the servant asked her whether he should take her back to her father's or to her father-in-law's, she is said to have replied that she would become a sati and wherever the horse stopped while carrying the ashes of the couple, a temple to their memory should be raised.

Another version of the legend, as related by Anne Hardgrove, says:

..., on one day about six hundred years ago a fourteen-year-old Hindu bride named Narayani Devi was coming home for the first time with her husband (of the Jalan lineage) just after their marriage. Her husband worked as a merchant in Jhunjhunu. Muslim invaders suddenly attacked her husband and his companions, brutally killing them. Only Narayani Devi and (in some versions) a loyal Muslim servant named "Rana" survived the attack. According to the story, Narayani Devi then bravely burned herself to death by spontaneously bursting into flames to avoid being captured and kidnapped by these invaders.

Other accounts ascribe the killing of her husband to a band of dacoits, and say that Rani died by the same hand in trying to defend her honour. Yet other versions regard Rani as the first of thirteen widows in her Jalan family to commit sati.

== Temple ==
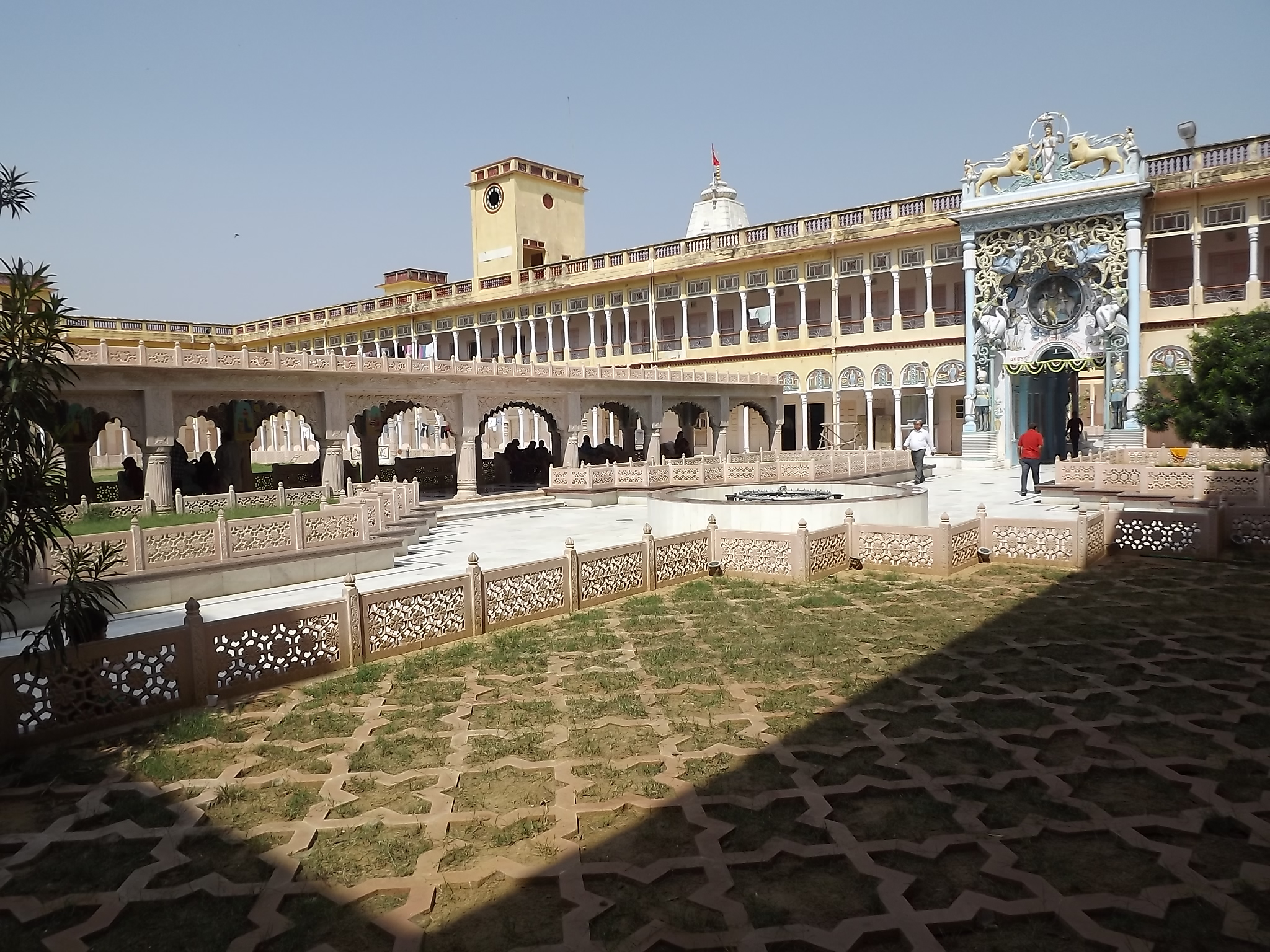
A gallery within the temple

The temple is notable for not holding any paintings or statues of either female or male gods. Instead a trishul depicting power and force is worshipped religiously by the followers. A portrait of Rani Sati dadiji is locate in the pradhan mand. The temple constructed from white marble and has colorful wall paintings.

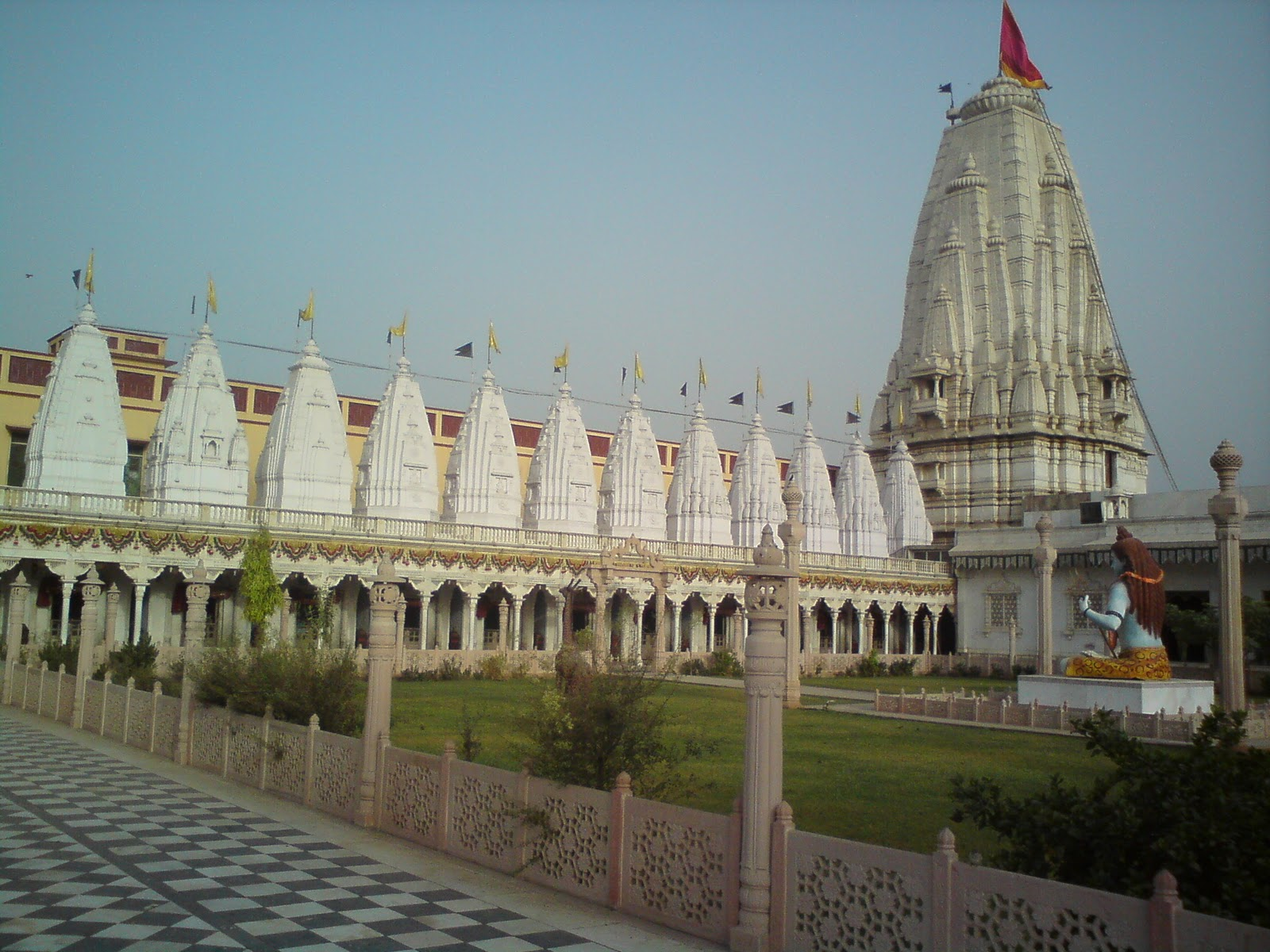

In the complex of Rani Sati temple there is also the Lord Hanuman Temple, Sita Temple, Thakur Ji temple, Lord Ganesha Temple and Shiva Temple. A regular 'Prasad' distribution takes place after every 'aarti'. As well as the main temple there are twelve smaller sati temples. A huge statue of Lord Shiva is located in the centre of the complex and is surrounded by green gardens. Inside the temple, the interiors are adorned with exquisite murals and glass mosaics depicting the entire history of the place.

== Observances and festivals ==
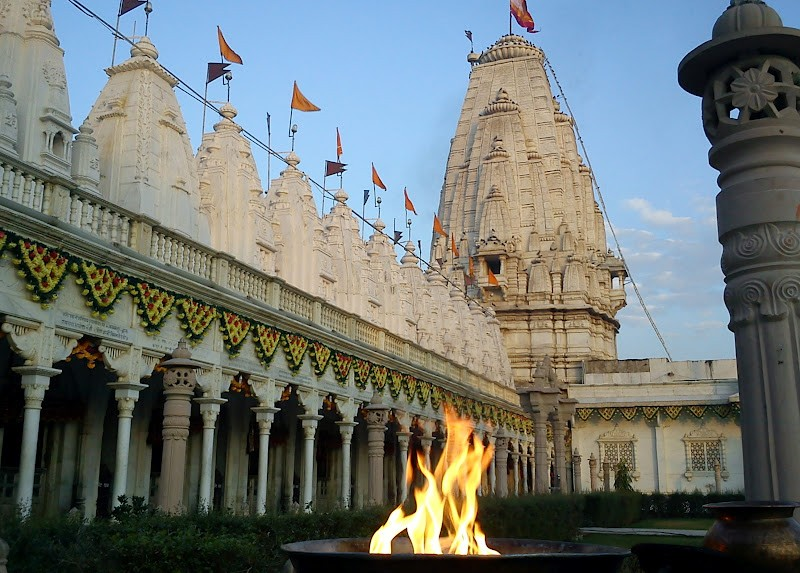
Aarti at Rani Sati Temple Jhunjhunu

Hundreds of devotees visit the temple every day. An elaborate aarti is performed at the temple two times a day. These are:

- Mangala Aarti: performed in the early morning, when the temple is opened.
- Sandhya Aarti: performed in the evening, at sunset.

A special Poojan utsav is held on the occasion of Bhadra Amavasya: The 15th day of the dark half of Bhadra month in the Hindu calendar is of special significance to the temple.
