= Bardu Chaina =

- village
- Location in Haryana, India, India Bardu Chaina (India)
- Coordinates: 28.630°N 75.812°E
- Country: India
- State: Haryana, India
- District: Bhiwani
- Founder: Baru

Population (2011)
  - Total: 1,725

Languages
- Time zone: UTC+5:30 (IST)
- PIN: 127201
- ISO 3166 code: IN-HR
- pilani rajasthan: Loharu
- Climate: warm (Köppen)
- Website: haryana.gov.in

Bardu Chaina is a village and gram panchayat in Loharu Tehsil of Bhiwani district in Haryana, India. The 2011 census of India gives the population of the village as 1,725. The gram panchayat also includes the village of Bardu Puran, population 476.For political representational purposes the village is part of Loharu Assembly constituency and the Bhiwani-Mahendragarh Lok Sabha constituency.
