= Khetri Mahal =

Ruined palace in Rajasthan, India

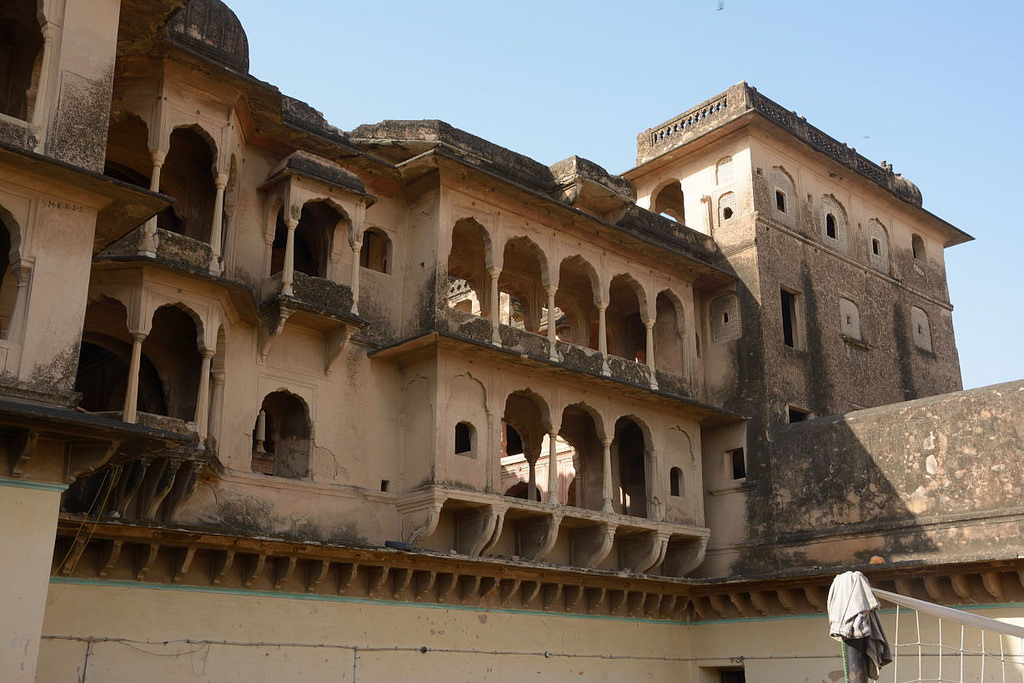

- Location within Rajasthan

General information
- Architectural style: Shekhawati
- Location: Jhunjhunu, India
- Coordinates: 28.126762°N 75.395200°E
- Completed: 1770
- Client: Maharaja Bhopal Singh

Height
- Height: 73 m (240 ft)

Khetri Mahal (Hindi: खेतड़ी महल), also known as the Wind Palace, whose ruins are an example of palace architecture in the India state of Rajasthan.

== History ==
Khetri Mahal was constructed by Bhopal Singh around 1770. Bhopal Singh was the grandson of Sardul Singh. Maharaja Sawai Pratap Singh of Jaipur built his Hawa Mahal, also known as the Wind Palace, on the model of the Khetri Mahal, in 1799. Khetri in itself was considered to be the second wealthiest 'Thikana' under Jaipur. Bhopal Singh was killed in the Second battle of Loharu, in which he tried to capture the Loharu Fort—one of 33 thikanas of Shekhawati rulers, at the place where he was cremated in Loharu, roughly 1 km (0.62 mi) from Loharu Fort, a commemorative chhatri was built which still survives.

Between 1870 and 1901, Ajit Singh of Khetri reigned as a ruler of the Shekhawat dynasty of the Indian state of Khetri.

== Architecture ==
Khetri Mahal is located behind a series of lanes. It is a paragon of Shekhawati art and architecture. It is primarily known for its fine paintings and murals mainly supporting the Raghunath temple and Bhopalgarh fort. The palace is remarkable among buildings of its region because of the flow of wind through its open portals rather than stopped windows or doors.

Wherever structurally possible, the walls have been pierced with arched openings. The levels of the Palace are combined through a series of ramps, installed to facilitate the movement of horseback guests toward the terrace, which gives commanding views.

Two small alcoves contain fragments of older paintings in the private chamber of Thakurs. Most of these paintings were executed in natural earth pigments. The interior rooms are open and colonnaded, the columns often surmounted with openwork and curved arches.

Most of the rooms are connected through arched portals rather than with doors, and much of the masonry is covered with a pinkish plaster.

One enters the palace via a student hostel at the base of the structure.

== Gallery ==
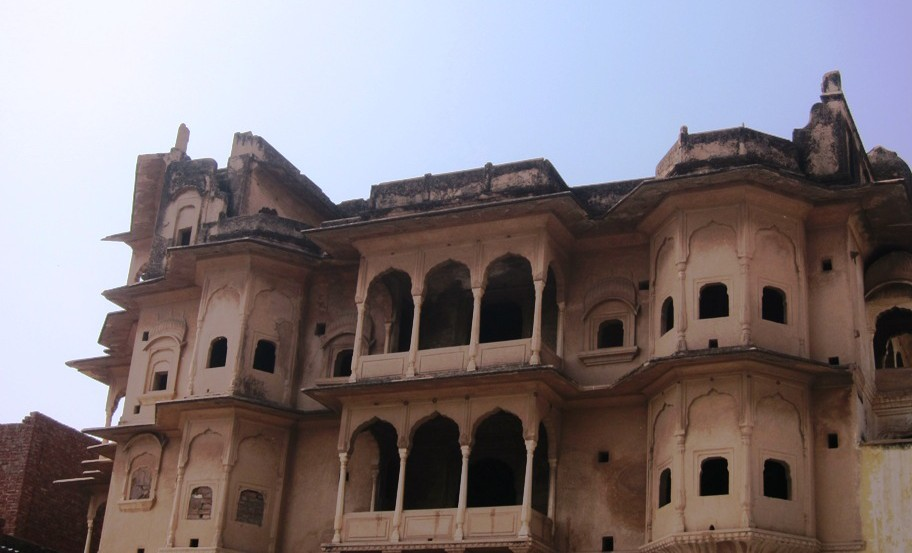
Side view of Khetri Mahal

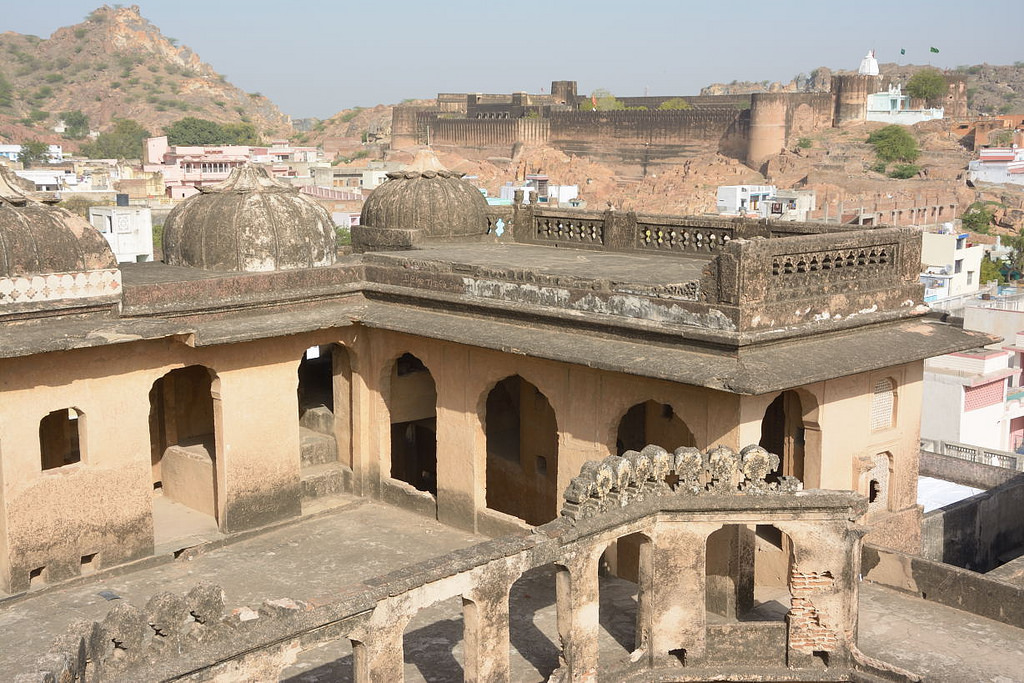
View of Badalgarh Fort from Khetri Mahal

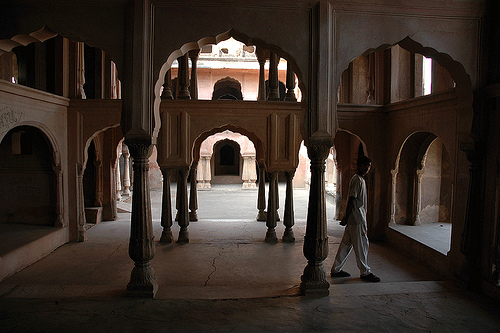
Interior view

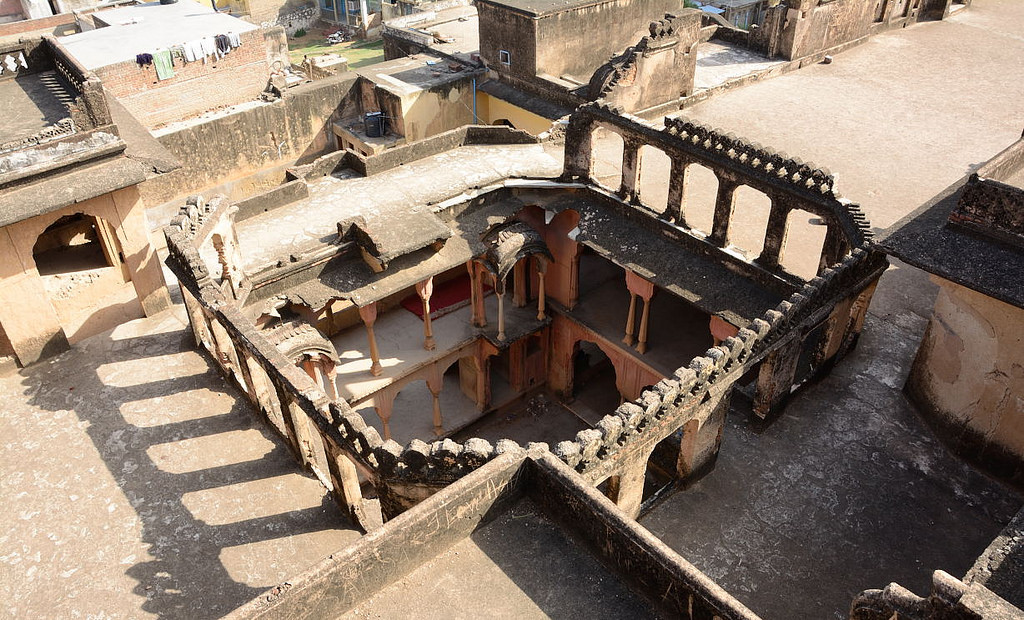
Khetri Mahal from above

== See also ==
- Rajput architecture
- Shekhawati
