= Sarju Sagar Dam =

Sarju Sagar Dam सरजू सागर बांध
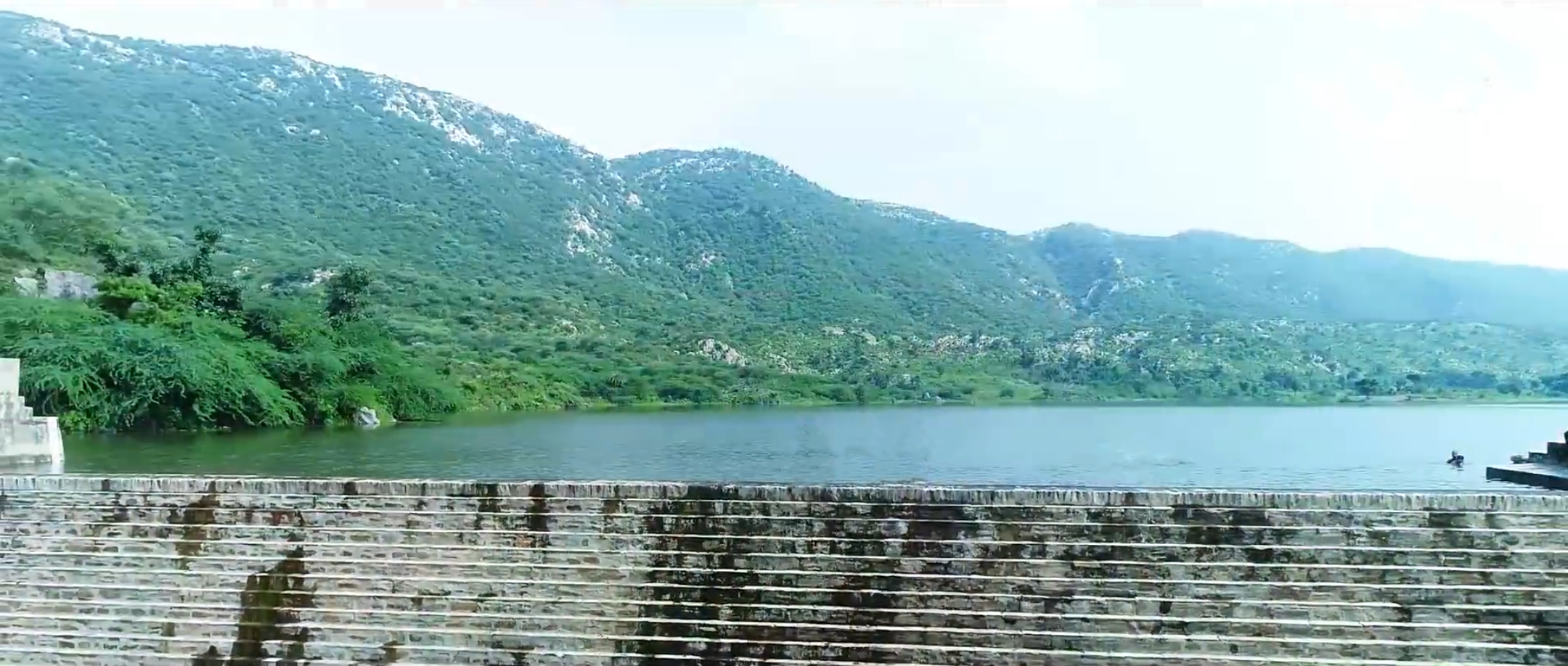

- Location within Rajasthan Location within India
- Official name: Kot Dam or Kot Bandh
- Country: India
- Location: Kot, Jhunjhunu
- Coordinates: 27°39′2″N 75°25′10″E
- Purpose: Water Storage, Irrigation
- Status: Operational
- Opening date: 1924; 102 years ago

Dam and spillways
- Type of dam: Masonry with embankment main sections
- Height: 7.6 m (25 ft)
- Length: 80 m (260 ft)

Sarju Sagar Dam also known as Kot Dam is a dam across the Shakambhari Hills. It is situated 13 kilometres from Udaipurwati town in Jhunjhunu, Rajasthan, India. The dam was constructed between 1923 and 1924 for the purposes of Irrigation and Water Storage.

A river flows from it that's name is "Saptrupi river", this flows from Kot dam to udaipurwati

== Gallery ==
Sarju Sagar Dam
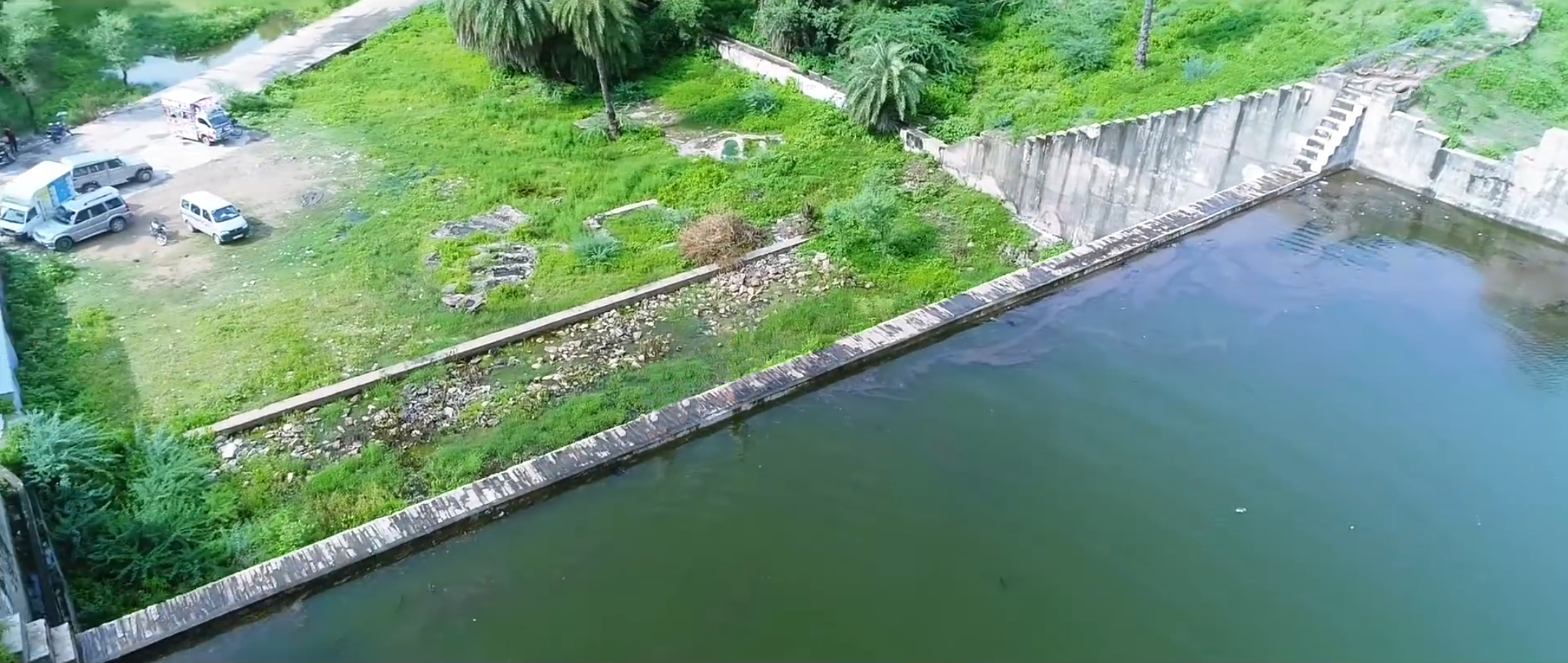
Aerial View of Dam.

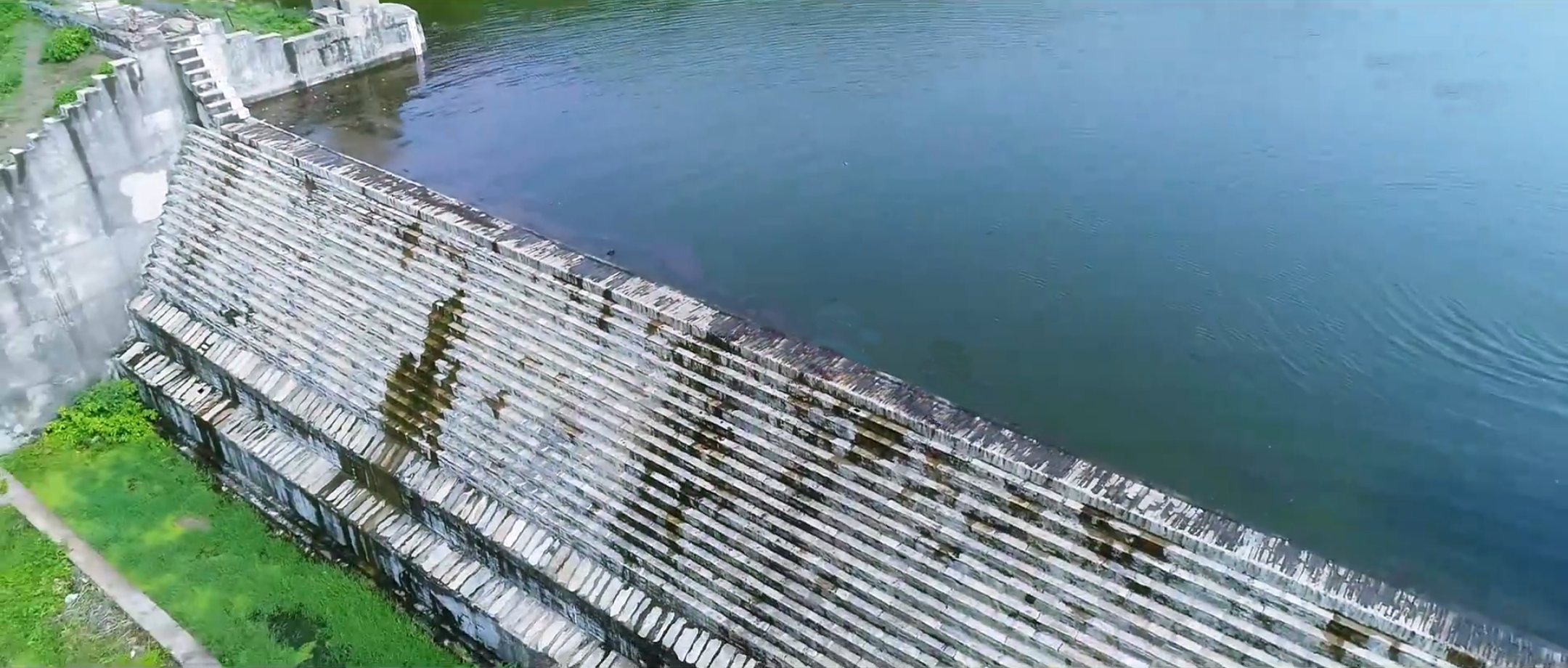
Aerial View of Dam.

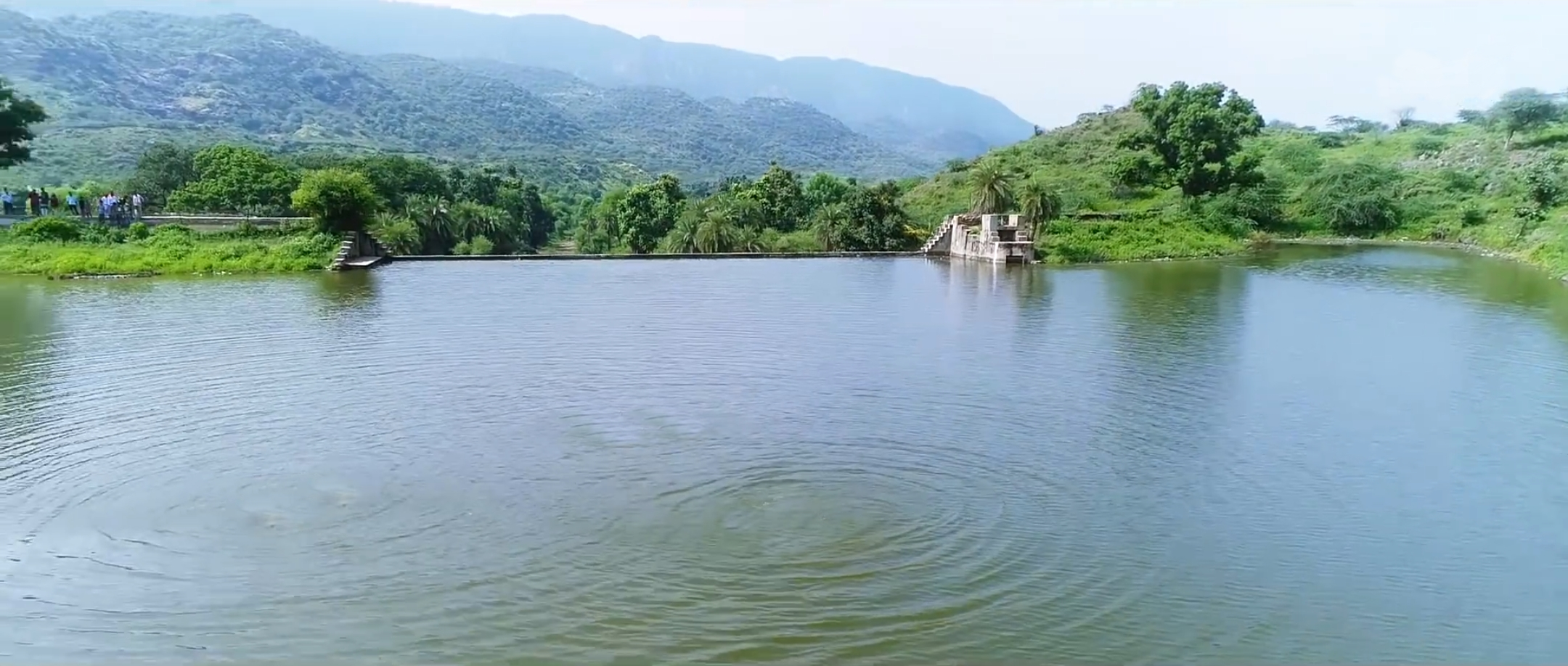
Aerial View of Dam.

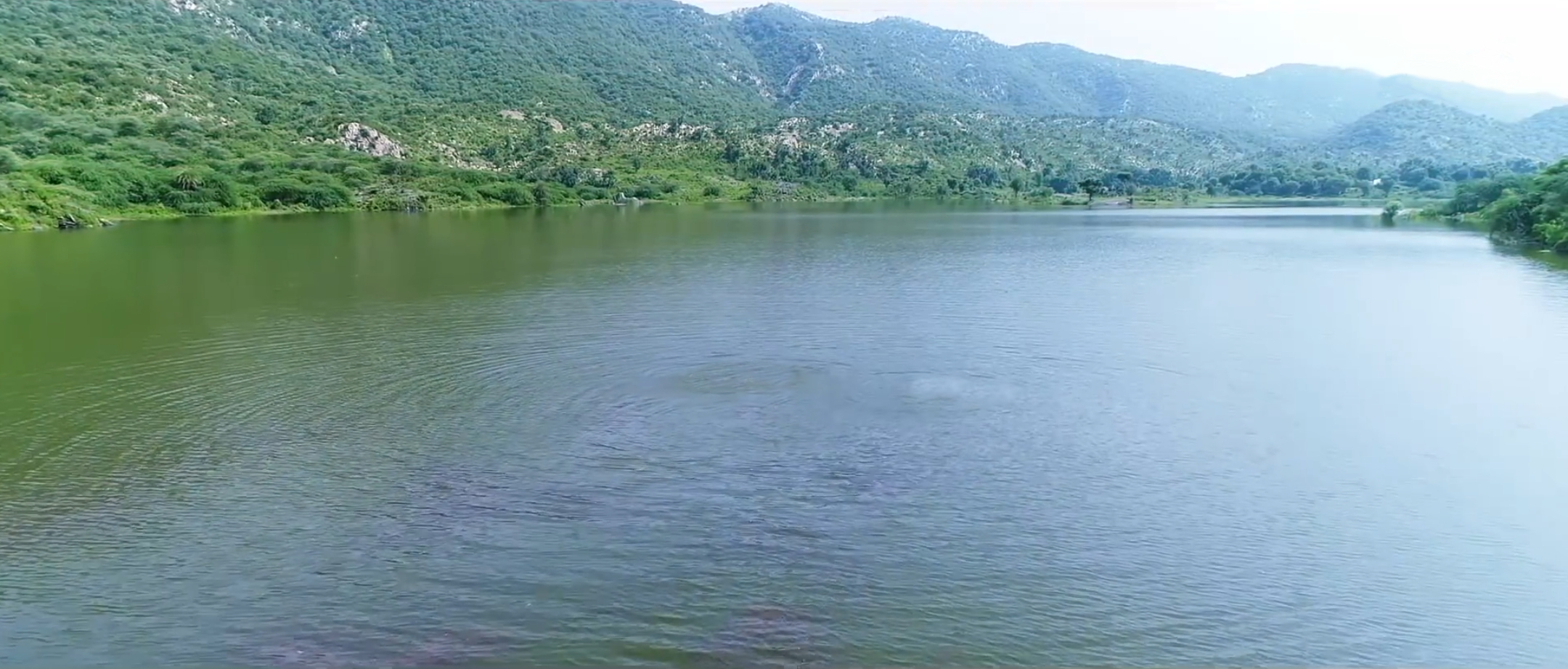
Water Storage inside the Dam.

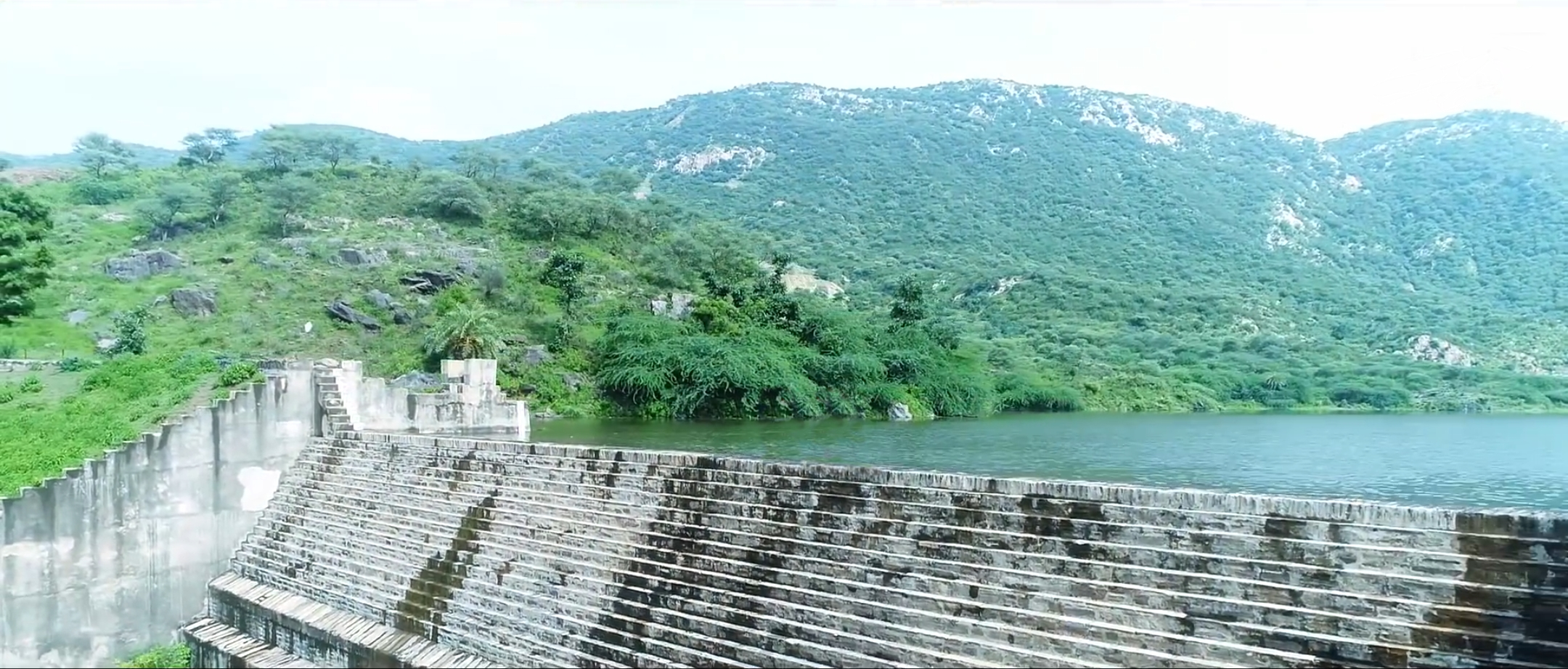
Front View of Dam from Position 1

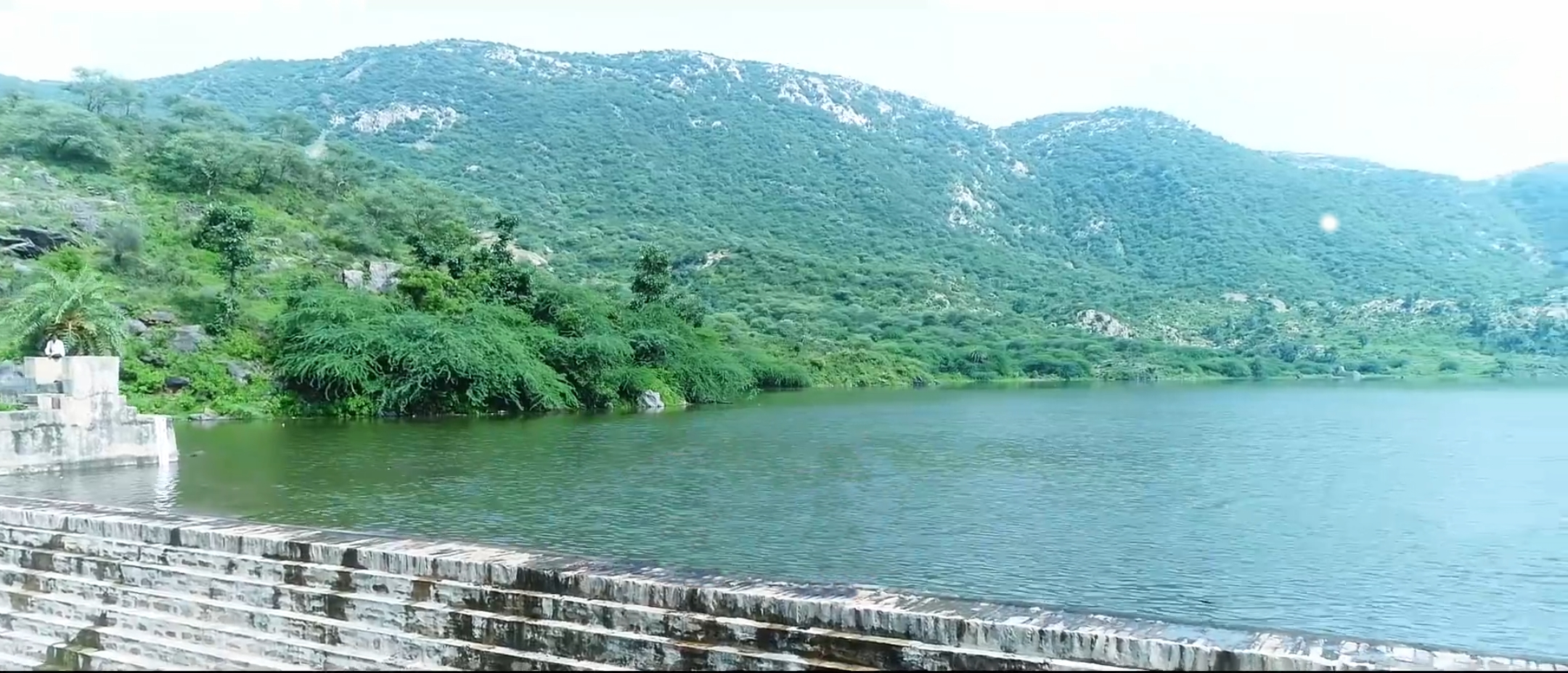
Front View of Dam from Position 2

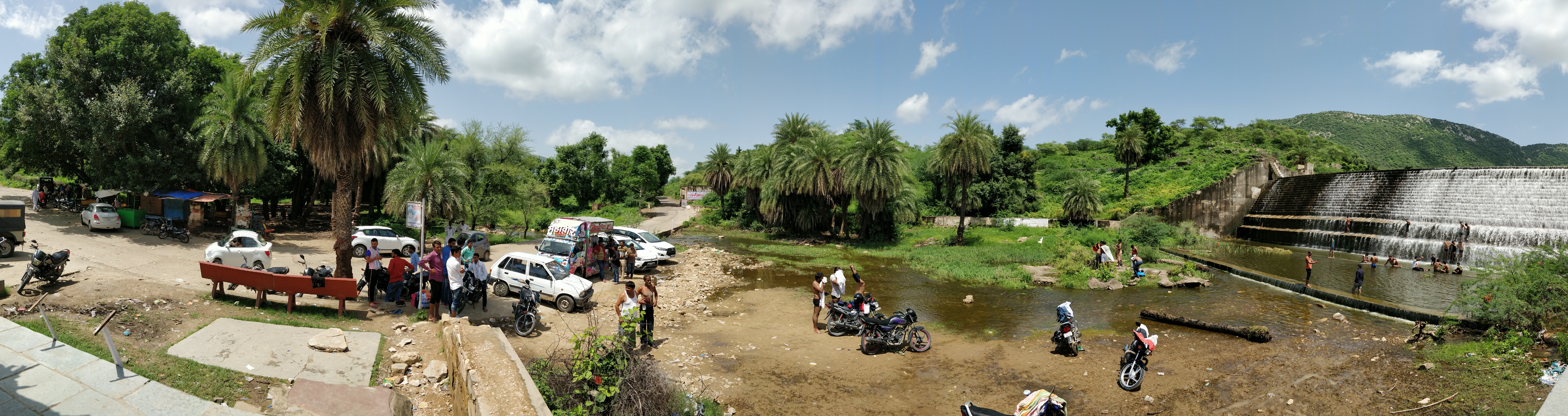
A panoramic view looking 180 degrees around the Sarju Sagar Dam in 2019

== Nearest places ==
- Shakmbhri Mata mandir, Shakmbhri, Jhunjhunu
- Dhabkyari Balaji, Kot
- D.D. Market, Kot
  - Sachin general Store
  - Bhargaw CSC centre
  - Bhargaw e- Mitra
