= Gignaw =

Gignow Gigangarh
- Village
- Gignow
- Location in Haryana, India Gignow (India)
- Coordinates: 28.4903°N 75.7966°E
- Country: India
- State: Haryana
- District: Bhiwani
- Tehsil: Loharu

Government
  - Body: Village panchayat Lachhi ram

Population (2011)
  - Total: 2,357

Languages
  - Official: Hindi
- Time zone: UTC+5:30 (IST)
- PIN: 127201

Gignaw is a village in Loharu tehsil of the Bhiwani district of the Indian state of Haryana, approximately 47 kilometres (29 mi) southwest of the district headquarters town of Bhiwani. As of the 2011 Census of India, the village had 556 households with a total population of 2,357 of which 1,222 were male and 1,135 female.For political representational purposes the village is part of Loharu Assembly constituency and the Bhiwani-Mahendragarh Lok Sabha constituency.
