= Khudania =

- village
- Location in Rajasthan, India Khudania (India)
- Coordinates: 28.325368°N 75.548126°E
- Country: India
- State: Rajasthan

Languages
  - Official: Hindi
- Time zone: UTC+5:30 (IST)
- PIN: 333031
- Telephone code: 01596
- Vehicle registration: RJ- 18
- Nearest city: Pilani
- Literacy: 70% (approx)
- Lok Sabha constituency: Jhunjunu
- Climate: hot in summer and very cool during winter (Köppen)
- Avg. summer temperature: 45 °C (113 °F)
- Avg. winter temperature: 05 °C (41 °F)

Khudania is a village in Jhunjhunu district, Rajasthan, India. The village is famous for being resident of Shekhawat Rajputs. Most of the residents of this village mostly work in defence and other private sector inPorbandar, Delhi, Mumbai, Jamnagar, in Birla Group of companies.
