= Mandawa Fort =

Heritage site in Jhunjhunu district of India

Mandawa Fort is an important heritage site of Shekhawati. It was built by the then Thakur Nawal Singh Bahadur, descendant of the Shekhawati rulers at Mandawa town, situated in Jhunjhunu district of Rajasthan, India. The fort is now run as a hotel by the Rajasthan Government Tourism Department.
