= Gagarwas =

- village
- Location in Rajasthan, India Gagarwas (India)
- Coordinates: 28°39′N 75°31′E
- Country: India
- State: Rajasthan
- District: Churu

Population (2010)
  - Total: 2,500

Languages
- Time zone: UTC+5:30 (IST)
- ISO 3166 code: RJ-IN
- Nearest city: Sadulpur
- Climate: warm (Köppen)

Gagarwas is a small village in Rajgarh (Sadulpur) tehsil of Churu district in Rajasthan, India, it is situated approximately 14 kilometres (8.7 mi) from Sadulpur.

== Description ==
The village contains approximately 300 houses. Gagarwas has been able to gain popularity to a certain extent in its surrounding areas for a comparatively large number of national level sports persons, military personnel and government servants. The village is surrounded by other smaller villages such as Suratpura, Ragha Badi, Ragha Chhoti, Bislan and Sadau.

The village was visited by Yoga Guru Swami Ramdev Ji on 19 May 2012 to unveil the statue of Shaheed deputy Commandant Vijaypal Singh who became a shaheed on 20 May 2010, while fighting against the Naxals in the Lalgarh area of the West Bengal. Over 15,000 people had gathered on this occasion.

== Notable people ==
- Krishna Poonia, a gold medallist in the discus at the 2010 Commonwealth Games in Delhi.
- Sapna Punia, a 20 km race walker who participated in the 2016 Summer Olympics.

== See also ==
- Sadulpur
- Jat people
