= Surajgarh =

- city
- Location in Rajasthan, India Surajgarh (India)
- Coordinates: 28.32°N 75.73°E
- Country: India
- State: Rajasthan
- District: Jhunjhunun
- Elevation: 280 m (920 ft)

Population (2001)
  - Total: 18,857

Languages
  - Official: Hindi
- Time zone: UTC+5:30 (IST)
- PIN: 333029
- ISO 3166 code: RJ-IN

Surajgarh is a city and a municipal corporation in the district of Jhunjhunu in the Shekhawati region of the Indian state of Rajasthan.

== Geography ==
Surajgarh is around 180 Km from Delhi. The town is divided into two parts: Surajgarh Bazar (old Surajgarh), and Surajgarh Mandi.

== Demographics ==
In the 2011 Indian census, Surajgarh had a population of 21,666, 53%, male and 47% female. Surajgarh has an average literacy rate of 79.8%, higher than the national average of 74.04%: The male literacy rate is 75%, while female literacy is 54%. In Surajgarh, 16% of the population is under 6 years of age.

== Economy ==
The economy of Surajgarh is primarily based on agriculture, trade, and small-scale industries. The town serves as a trading center for agricultural products like wheat, mustard, and pulses. Additionally, many residents have migrated to metropolitan cities and abroad, contributing to the local economy through remittances.

== Education ==
Surajgarh has a strong educational infrastructure, with numerous schools and colleges. Institutions such as Surajgarh College and several private schools offer quality education, making the town a regional hub for students from nearby villages.

== Tourism ==
Surajgarh attracts tourists due to its historical havelis adorned with Shekhawati-style fresco paintings. The town also has ancient temples and heritage sites that reflect its rich architectural and cultural history.

== Transportation ==
Surajgarh is well connected by road, with frequent bus services to major cities in Rajasthan and Haryana. The nearest railway station is in Surajgarh itself, providing connectivity to Delhi, Jaipur, and other major cities. The nearest airport is in Jaipur, approximately 180 km away.

== Culture and Festivals ==
The town celebrates various traditional Rajasthani festivals, including Diwali, Holi, and Teej. The local fairs and cultural events showcase folk music, dance, and handicrafts unique to the region.

== Amenities ==
Surajgarh Fort operates as a heritage hotel.
