= Chirawa =

- Municipal Town
- Location in Rajasthan, India Chirawa (India)
- Coordinates: 28.25°N 75.63°E
- Country: India
- State: Rajasthan
- District: Jhunjhunun
- Elevation: 294 m (965 ft)

Population (2011)
  - Total: 43,953

Languages
  - Official: Hindi
- Time zone: UTC+5:30 (IST)
- PIN: 333026
- Telephone code: 91-1596
- Vehicle registration: RJ-18

Chirawa is a municipal town and tehsil in Jhunjhunu district of Shekhawati region in Rajasthan state of India. Its elevation is 294 m (965 ft) above sea level.

== Culture ==
Chirawa has a rich cultural history. The town is locally famous for its beautiful havelis.

The people of Chirawa has a local deity Pandit Paramhans Ganesh Narayan, more affectionately known as Bavaliya Baba. People often visit his temple on Thursdays. His birthday is celebrated as a mega fair with lakhs of followers visiting every year from all over India.

The town is also famous for the sweet Chirawa Peda.

== Famous People ==
Chirawa has given India some of its finest businessman like Ramkrishna Dalmia and Ghanshyam Das Birla.

== See also ==
- Jhunjhunu district
