= Gudhagorji =

Gudha gorji Gudha Gorji
- Town
- Nickname: Gudha
- Location in Rajasthan, India Gudha gorji (India)
- Coordinates: 27.8889°N 75.4843°E
- Country: India
- State: Rajasthan
- District: Jhunjhunu
- Founder: Jhunjhar Singh Ji

Languages
  - Official: Hindi language
- Time zone: UTC+5:30 (IST)
- Postal code: 333022
- ISO 3166 code: RJ-IN
- Vehicle registration: RJ-18

Gudha Gorji is a small town & tehsil located near Udaipurwati in Jhunjhunu district, Shekhawati region of Rajasthan, India. It is also known as "Shiksha Nagari" because it is centre of quality education for students living in nearby villages.

== History ==
The town Gudha named after Saint Gudheshwar Maharaj and a very religious and wise thukurainji named Gorji. Gudha Gorji is one of the important commercial towns in the Jhunjhunu district.

== Transport ==
Gudhagorji is connected by state highway SH-37, and can be reached by car or bus from Jhunjhunu, Jaipur or Sikar. The town is about 33 km from Jhunjhunu, 50 km from Sikar and 140 km from Jaipur.

== Population ==
The population of the town is approximately 12 Thousand.

== Language ==
The language used by local people is Shekhawati language but everyone knows Hindi as it is a part of north India. As Jhunjhunu shares its borders with Haryana so Haryanvi accent is also visible in native people's language.
