= Loharu =

Loharu Luharu
- City
- Location in Haryana, India Loharu (India)
- Coordinates: 28.4032°N 75.9856°E
- Country: India
- State: Haryana
- District: Bhiwani
- Elevation: 262 m (860 ft)

Population (2001)
  - Total: 11,421

Languages
  - Official: Hindi, English
  - Regional: Bagri and Ahirwati
- Time zone: UTC+5:30 (IST)
- ISO 3166 code: IN-HR
- Vehicle registration: HR 18
- Website: haryana.gov.in

Loharu is a city, municipal committee and assembly constituency, in the Bhiwani district of the Indian state of Haryana. It is the administrative headquarters of one of the four administrative sub-divisions of the district and covers 119 villages. It also has a railway junction station.

The city's main commercial hub is its Anaaj Mandi (grain market), which was built by Sir Aminuddin Ahmed Khan in the year 1937. The Mandi is unique in design as it contains both residential and commercial premises for the merchants around a large central open space. It consists of 104 shops or 52 'Jodas' (couplets) as it was popularly called. The tax-free Mandi in its prime gathered goods from far and near for trade and contributed considerably to the prosperity in the region.

Another attraction of the town is the bi-annual Camel fair held in the months of January and July. The Camels come from Rajasthan and other areas of Haryana, making it a colourful and festive venue. The present economy is based on agriculture and trade.

Loharu was the seat of the eponymous princely state of Shekhawati during the British Raj, Thakur rule was established in 1870; and an important reminiscence of that is the Loharu Fort, now a key tourist destination.

== Etymology ==
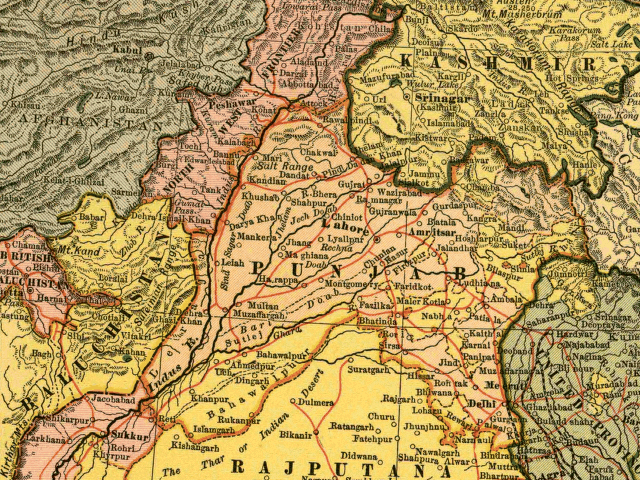
Loharu at the edge of Punjab (BrL) in Shekhawati

The town gets its name from the Lohars or blacksmiths of the town who were employed in the minting of coins for the erstwhile Jaipur state.

== History ==
Rao Shekha, a Shekhawat rajput (sub-branch of Kachwaha or Kushwaha), was the founder of Shekhawati, who originally divided Shekhawati into 33 Thikana (also called a Pargana), each styled as Thakur with at least a 'kuccha' mud fort, some of which were fortified further with stone. After him, additional thikanas were granted to the descendants of subsequent generations.

- Tosham Shekhavati Thikana, was granted as a thikana by Shekhawati ruler Maharaja Mukund Singh in 1870 to Kunwar Abhaya Singh, the son of Maharaja Raj Singh II.
- Mahendragarh Thikana, was granted as a thikana by Shekhawati ruler Maharaja Mukund Singh in 1868 to Kunwar Sheonath Singh I, the son of Maharaja Raj Singh II.
- Madhogarh Thikana and Madhogarh Fort were founded by Madho Singh I in the first half of the 18th century, when he placed the area under the control of Balwant Singh. The fort is named after Madho Singh I; "Madhogarh" literally means "the fort of Madho".
- Loharu Thikana, Loharu was founded as 33rd Thikana in the year 1588 A.D by the Thakur Narhar Das, a direct decedent of Rao Shekha. Loharu was then a small village with a 'kuccha' mud fort and stayed as such until 1800 A.D. During This period two important battles were fought here. The first war in 1671 A.D, during the time of Aurangzeb, was fought between Thakur Madan Singh and the Mughal Governor of Hisar for Refusing to pay the Land Revenue. The other was fought between the then Thakur Kirat Singh and Thakur Baghwan Das Singh of Khetri who claimed Loharu as part of Khetri. Thakur Baghwan Das Singh was killed in this battle outside the Loharu Fort and a Chhatri was built as a samadhi in his honour at the place where he was cremated, which is located about 1 km from the Fort. The Loharu pargana thereafter passed on to the direct rule of Shekhawati and subsequently became the paragana under the State of Shekhawati ruled by Kunwar Arjun Singh (Son of Maharaja Raj Singh II) from 1870. The Thikana of Loharu was then granted to Kunwar Arjun Singh in 1870 when he received the town of Loharu from the British East India Company as well as from Shekhawati ruler Maharaja Mukund Singh as a reward for his services against the Jat rulers of Bharatpur. Around 1755, this area was brought under the Maratha Empire by Maharaja Khande Rao Holkar of Indore in 1792. Maratha Maharaj Mahadaji Shinde (Scindia) of Gwalior had conquered Rania, Fatehabad and Sirsa from Bhatti Rajput Muslims. Haryana came under Maratha Empire. Mahad ji divided Haryana in four territories: Delhi (Mughal emperor Shah Alam II, his family and areas surrounding Delhi), Panipat (Kernal, Sonepat, Kurukshetra and Ambala), Hisar (Hisar, Sirsa, Fatehabad, parts of Rohtak), Mewat (Gurugaon, Rewari, Narnaul, Mahendragarh). Daulat Rao Scindia ceded Haryana on 30 December 1803 under the Treaty of Surji-Anjangaon to British East India Company's Company rule in India. Ahmad Baksh Khan was given the territory of Loharu by British for his services against Maratha. Daulat Rao Scindia ceded Haryana on 30 December 1803 under the Treaty of Surji-Anjangaon to British East India Company's Company rule in India. Shekhawat Thakurs of Loharu are:
  - Kunwar Arjun Singh (1870–1896)
  - Rajkunwar Silahaditya Singh (1896–1926)
  - Rajkunwar Vikramaditya Singh (1926–1956)
  - Rajkunwar Nagaditya Singh (1956–1988)
  - Shri Sahib Ranaditya Singh (1988–present)

After the Independence of India in 1947, the state acceded to the Union of India in 1948. Many of the ruling family and the city's Muslim inhabitants re-settled in Lahore, Pakistan. However, the Thakur and his direct descendants stayed on, in India.

== Monuments ==
=== Loharu Fort ===
The 'Paragana' under the State of Shekhawati ruled by Thakur Arjun Singh in the year 1870. It was from this year onwards that 'pukka' construction of mud fort and village started.

Over the years of construction come to include an interesting blend of Architecture. The South-Wing of the Fort contained the 'darbar' and the 'sheesh mahal' or the room of mirrors which has Mughal-Rajput style. The central part of the south-wing contained a large victorian style audience chamber and banquet hHall. The right side of south-wing consisted of the 'Janana Mahal' along with the kitchens. The left side of the South-Wing were purely Mughal architecture and contained the 'SNANGHAR'(Baths). The east-wing at the time and was distinct from the 'Shekhawati Haveli 'Style. The fort was in the hands of subsequent Thakurs of Loharu till 1971 when the late thakur Rajkumar Nagaditya Singh sold it to the Government of Haryana. Since these buildings were not lived in, all the constructions of the north-wing and west-wing had collapsed as was part of the east-wing. Only the South-Wing of the fort containing the 'Roshan Manjil' survives and that too in a very dilapidated State.

=== Hindu tombs ===
Hindu tombs of Loharu, including the tomb of thakur Bhopal Singh of Loharu, commemorate the battle fought between Khetri Raja and the thakurs of Loharu thikana, both of whom belonged to Shekhawat rajput clan of Shekhawati.

== Education ==
There are a number of institutions of higher education located in the Loharu area.

- Government P.G College on Bhiwani road, affiliated to Maharshi Dayanand University Rohtak.
- Women's Government P.G College near Dadri Mod, affiliated to Maharshi Dayanand University Rohtak.
- Rani Jhansi Laxmi Bai Government Polytechnic, located on the Loharu-Bhiwani road.
- Keystone Group of Institutions, an AICTE approved institution offering BTech and MBA courses from Rajasthan Technical University, is 5 kilometres (3.1 mi) from the Loharu station.
- Birla Institute of Technology and Science (Pilani, Rajasthan), is 30 kilometres (19 mi) from Loharu. from

== Transport ==
- Airports: Hisar Airport 92 km north, IGI Delhi Airport 160 km east, Bhiwani Airport 65 km northeast, Narnaul Airport 70 km southwest.
- Highway: NH-709 Rohtak-Bhiani-Loharu-Pilani-Sadulpur, NH-334B Jhajjar-Charkhi Dadri-Loharu, State Highway SH-7 Loharu-Chirawa.
- Railway: Loharu is a railway station junction on broad gauge Rewari-Kanina-Sadulpur and Loharu- Sikar- Jaipur railway routes.

== Villages ==
- See villages in Loharu tehsil

== See also ==
- Divisions of Haryana
- History of Haryana
- Tourism in Haryana
