= Udaipurwati =

- town
- Location in Rajasthan, India Udaipurwati (India)
- Coordinates: 27.72885°N 75.47156°E
- Country: India
- State: Rajasthan
- District: Jhunjhunu

Population (2011)
  - Total: 29,236

Languages
  - Official: Hindi
- Time zone: UTC+5:30 (IST)
- PIN: 333 307
- Telephone code: 91-1594
- ISO 3166 code: RJ-IN
- Vehicle registration: RJ-18

Udaipurwati (उदयपुरवाटी) is a town and a municipality in Jhunjhunu District in the Indian state of Rajasthan. Sikar is the nearest city near Udaipurwati. Udaipurwati is a tehsil in the Jhunjhunu district in Rajasthan. It is also Sub Division and Tehsil of Jhunjhunu District. Its ancient name, mentioned in Harsha Inscription 961 AD (L-39), was Udarbhatika (उदर्भटिका).

== Demographics ==
As of the 2001 Indian census, Udaipurwati had a population of 27,831. Males constitute 52% of the population and females 48%. Udaipurwati has an average literacy rate of 56%, lower than the national average of 59.5%: male literacy is 69%, and female literacy is 43%. In Udaipurwati, 19% of the population is under 6.

== See also ==
- Thikanas of Shekhawati
- Sarju Sagar dam
