= Jhunjhunu district =

- District of Rajasthan
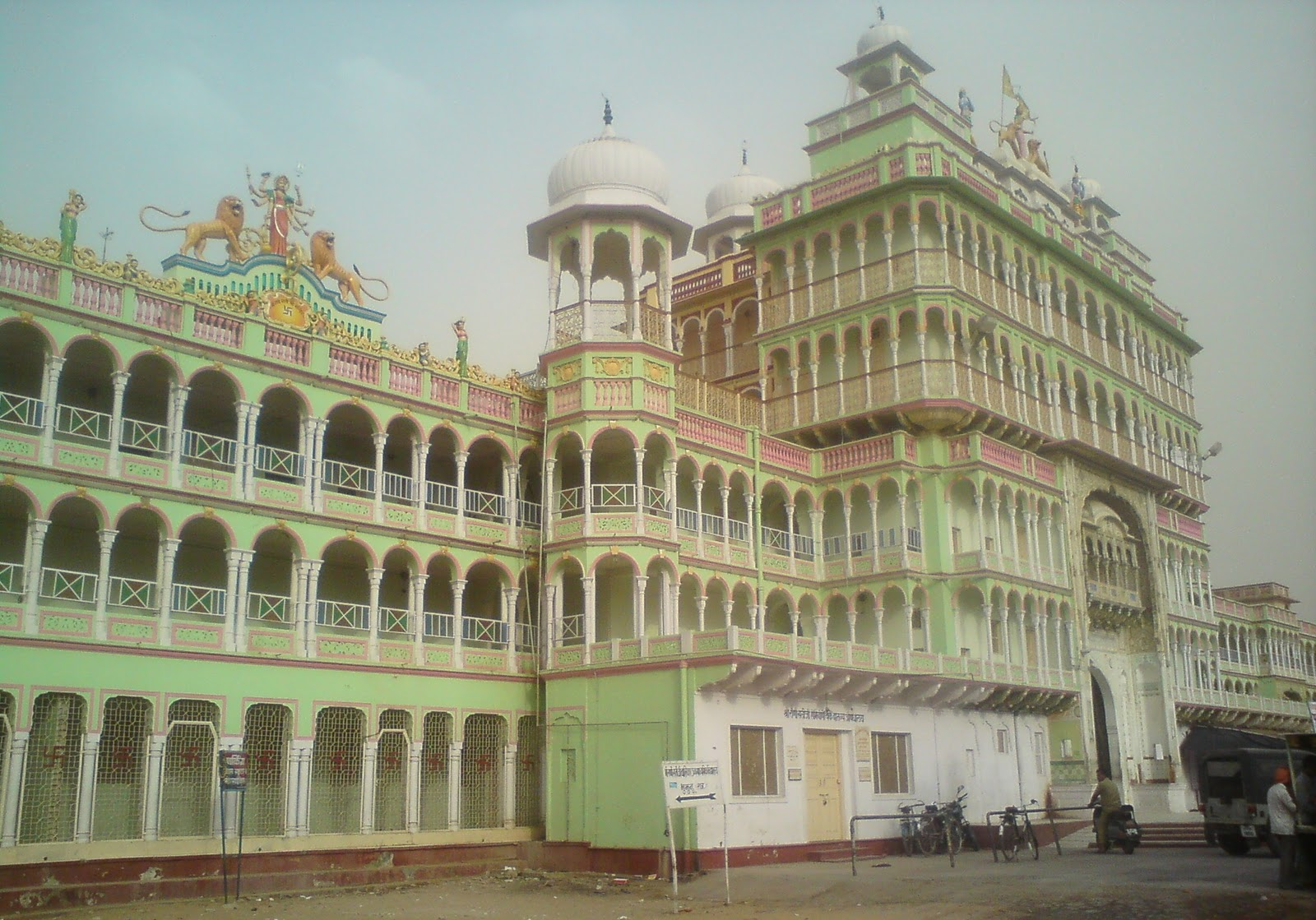
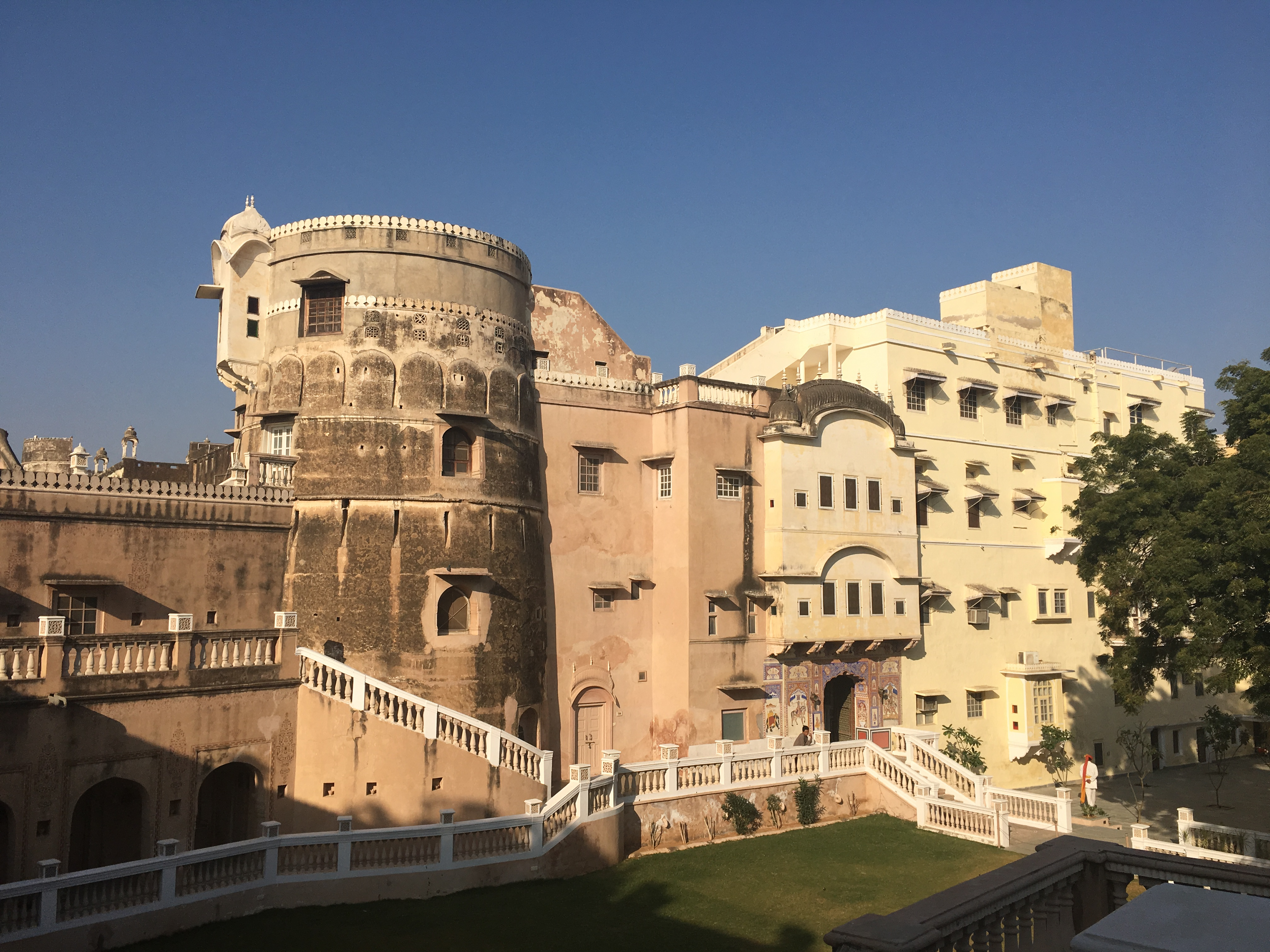
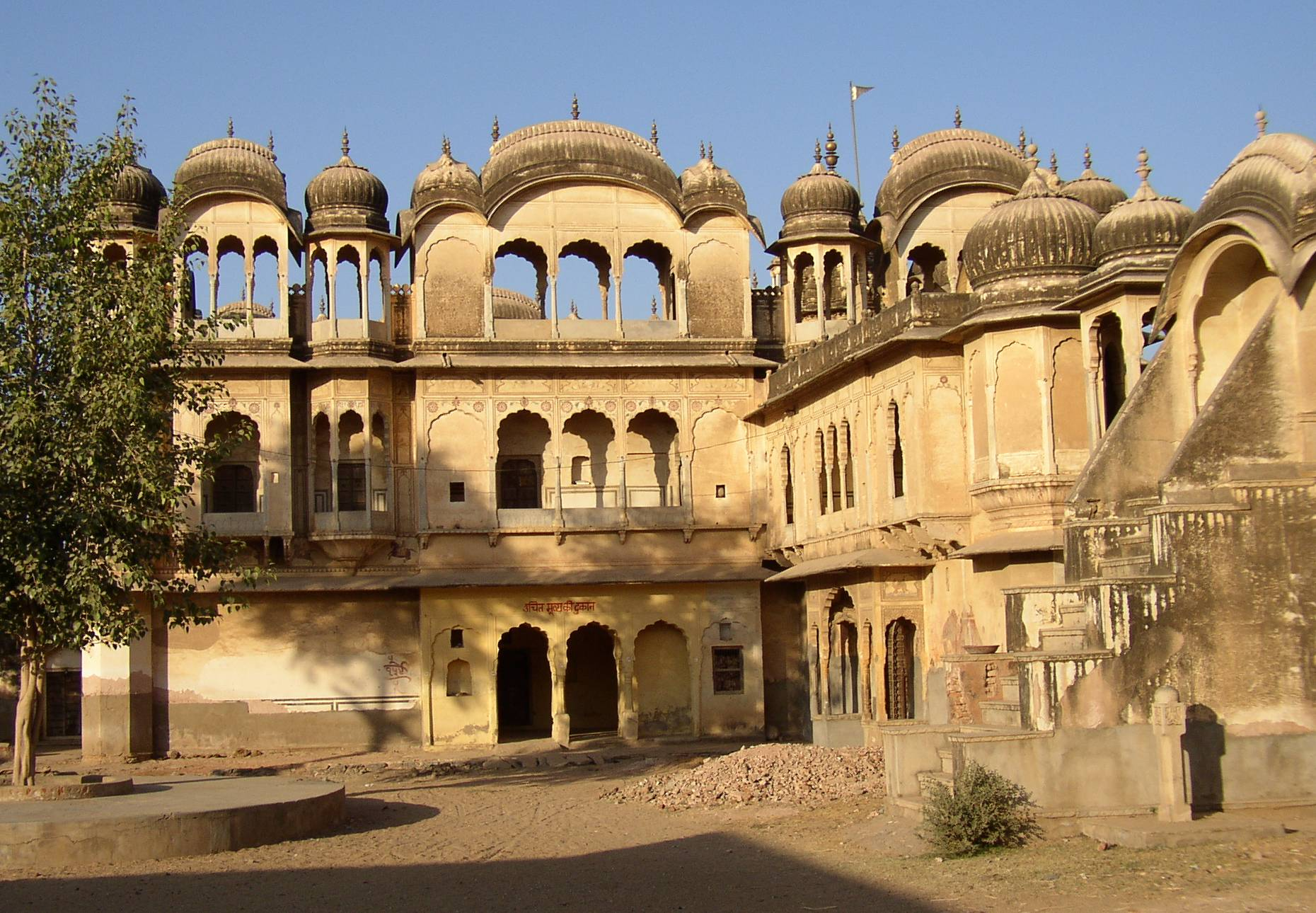
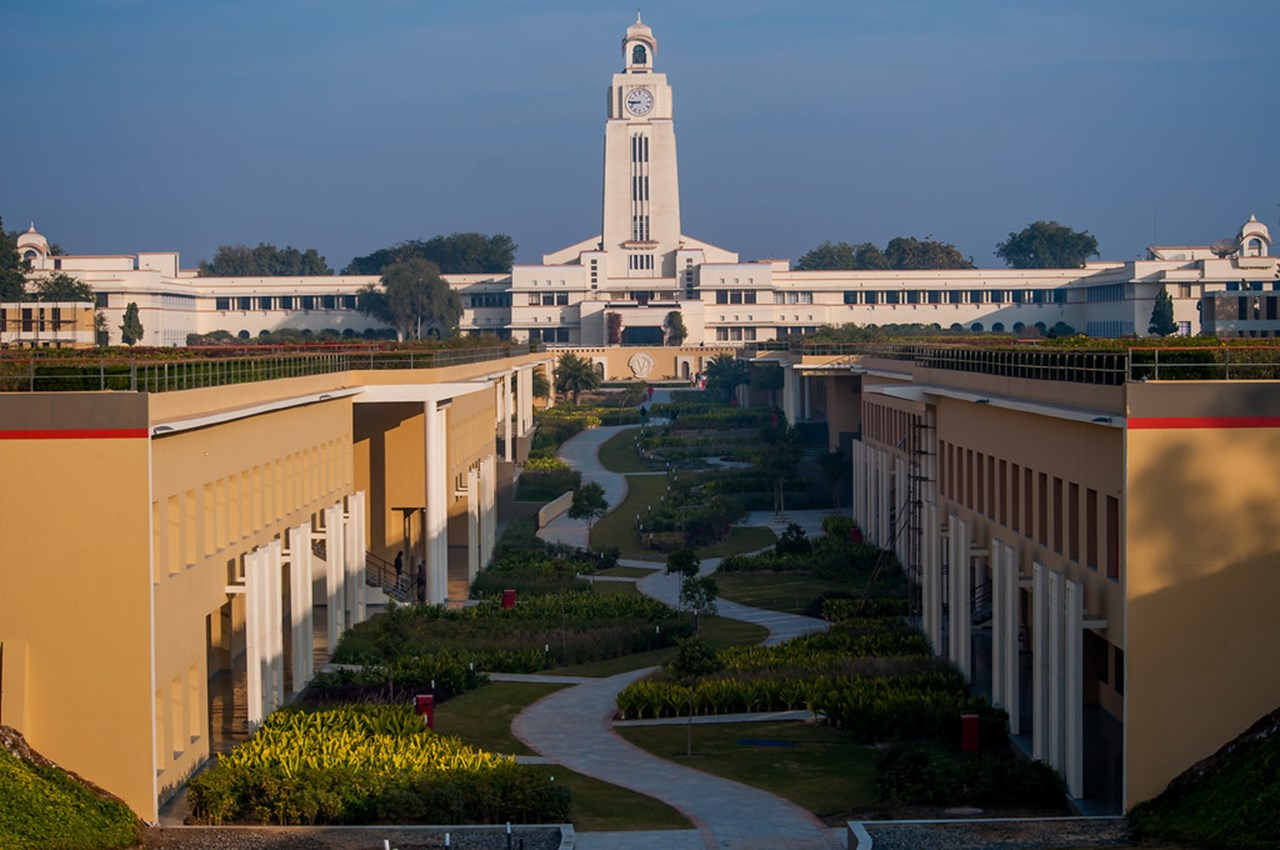
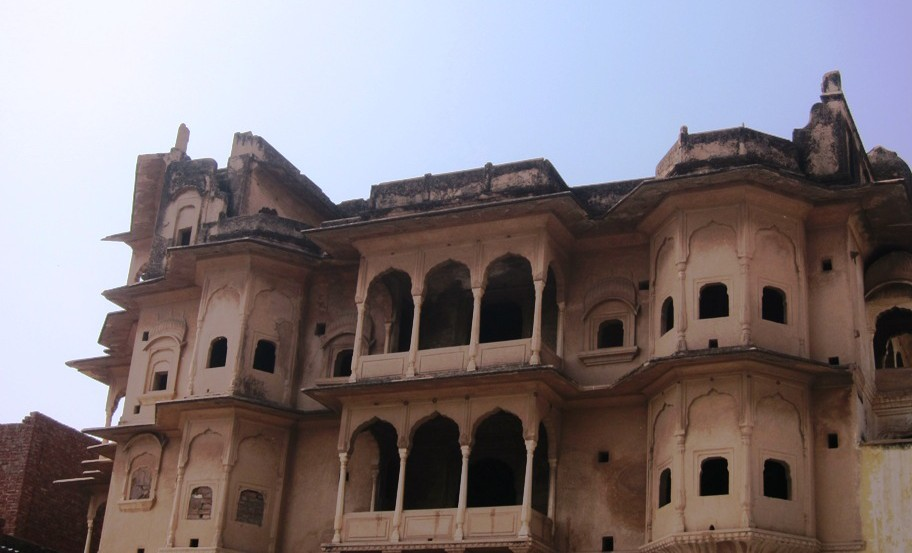
- Rani Sati Temple Mandawa Fort Temple in Nawalgarh Clock tower at BITS Pilani Khetri Mahal

- Location of Jhunjhunu district in Rajasthan
- Coordinates (Jhunjhunu): 75.02°N 76.06°E - 27.38°N 28.31°E
- Country: India
- State: Rajasthan
- Division: Jaipur
- Headquarters: Jhunjhunu
- Tehsils: Jhunjhunu; Bissau; Buhana; Chirawa; Gudha Gorji; Khetri; Malsisar; Mandawa; Nawalgarh; Pilani; Surajgarh; Udaipurwati

Government
  - District Collector & Magistrate: Dr. Arun Garg, IAS
  - Superintendent of Police: Lokesh Sonewal , IPS
  - Member of Parliament: Brijendra Singh Ola , INC

Area
  - Total: 5,928 km^{2} (2,289 sq mi)

Population (2011)
  - Total: 2,137,045
  - Density: 360.5/km^{2} (933.7/sq mi)
  - Urban: 22.89 percent

Demographics
  - Literacy: 74.72
  - Sex ratio: 950
- Time zone: UTC+05:30 (IST)
- Major Highways: National Highway 11; State Highway 8
- Website: Jhunjhunu District

Jhunjhunu district is a district of the Indian state of Rajasthan in northern India. The city of Jhunjhunu is the district headquarters. The district is famous for the frescos on its grand havelis and for providing considerable representation to Indian defense forces. The district falls within the Shekhawati region, and is bounded on the northeast and east by Haryana state, on the southeast, south & southwest by Sikar district & on the northwest and north by Churu district.

== Demographics ==
Historical population
Year	Pop.	±% p.a.
1901	341,572	—
1911	369,081	+0.78%
1921	353,140	−0.44%
1931	405,519	+1.39%
1941	491,003	+1.93%
1951	588,736	+1.83%
1961	719,650	+2.03%
1971	929,230	+2.59%
1981	1,211,583	+2.69%
1991	1,582,421	+2.71%
2001	1,913,689	+1.92%
2011	2,137,045	+1.11%

According to the 2011 census Jhunjhunu district has a population of 2,139,658, roughly equal to the nation of Namibia or the US state of New Mexico. This gives it a ranking of 214th in India (out of a total of 640). The district has a population density of 361 inhabitants per square kilometre (930/sq mi). Its population growth rate over the decade 2001–2011 was 11.81%. Jhunjhunu has a sex ratio of 950 females for every 1000 males, It also has a literacy rate of 74.72% which is considered excellent. 22.89% of the population live in urban areas. Scheduled Castes and Scheduled Tribes make up 16.88% and 1.95% of the population respectively.

Religions in Jhunjhunu district (2011)
Religion	Percent
Hindus	89.17%
Muslims	10.68%
Other or not stated	0.15%

=== Languages ===
Shekhawati a dialect of Rajasthani, and Hindi are mainly spoken languages. The language blends into Haryanvi along the Haryana border.

== Culture/Cityscape ==
There are various places of interests in and around Jhunjhunu.

- Rani Sati Temple
- Khetri Mahal
- Alsisar Mahal in Alsisar
- Tibrewala and Modi Haveli
- Bissau Fort, Bissau
- Surajgarh Fort, Surajgarh
- Bissau Mahal, Bissau
- Shyamgarh Fort in Jhunjhunu
- Bishangarh Fort in Tamkor
- Mandawa Fort (Castle Mandawa) in Mandawa
- Sculpture of Raja Jujhar Singh Jat
- Havelis in Nawalgarh
- Havelis and forts of Mukundgarh
- Sarju Sagar Dam
- Dhosi Hill
- Bawaliya Pandit Mandir, Chirawa

=== Museums ===
- Birla Science Museum, Pilani
- Ajit-Vivekananda Museum, Khetri
- Science Park Nawalgarh

=== Fairs ===
- Gangaur Mela of Baragaon
- Gangaur Mela of Bhagera
- Ramdev ji Mela, Nawalgarh

== Film location ==
The Mandawa area of Jhunjhunu district has been used as a film location for several Bollywood films, including the dance sequences of "Cutie Pie" in the movie Ae Dil Hai Mushkil, and the portrayal of Mandawa as Lucknow in the same film, and as Pakistan in Kabir Khan's Bajrangi Bhaijaan.

Other notable films shot in the district include Half Girlfriend, Mirziya, PK, Jab We Met, Paheli, Shudh Desi Romance, Dolly Ki Doli, Manorama Six Feet Under and Kachche Dhaage.

== Education ==
=== Universities and colleges ===
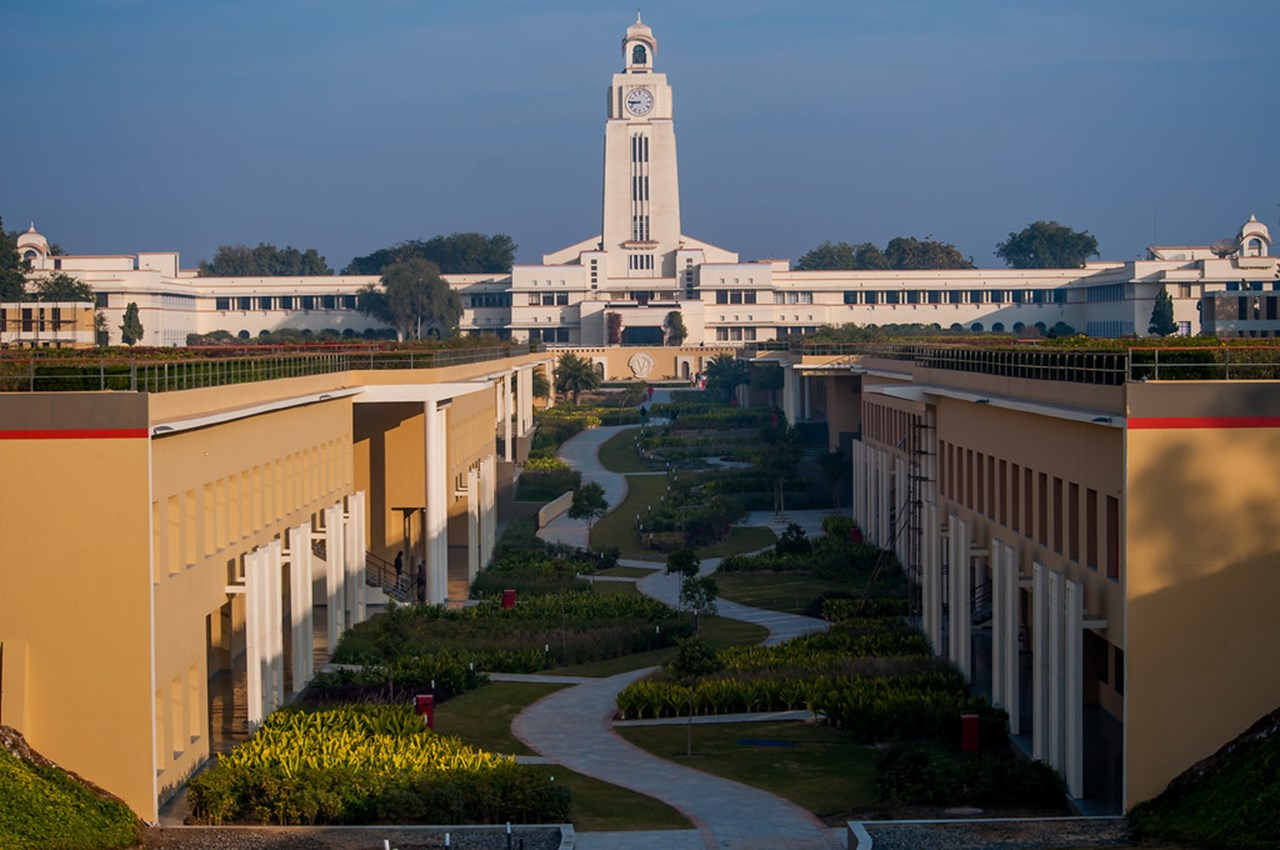
BITS, Pilani

Universities in the district include Birla Institute of Technology & Science, Pilani (BITS Pilani) and Central Electronics Engineering Research Institute (CEERI), in Pilani, Jhunjhunu.

Plans are underway for the establishment of a new sports university in the Jakhron Ka Bas, Deorasar, supported by the Government of Rajasthan.

== Notable people ==
- Padma Shri Shish Ram Ola, Minister of Labour and Employment (17 June 2013 – 15 December 2013), Member of 11th Lok Sabha, 12th Lok Sabha, 13th Lok Sabha, 14th Lok Sabha & 15th Lok Sabha
- Jagdeep Dhankhar, 14th Vice President of India
- Param Vir Piru Singh, an Indian Army non-commissioned officer, awarded the Param Vir Chakra (PVC), India's highest military decoration
- Acharya Shri Mahapragya (The tenth head of the Svetambar Terapanth order of Jainism)
- Ajit Singh of Khetri, Friend of Swami Vivekananda
- G.D. Birla, industrialist
- Ajay Piramal, industrialist
- Karmveer Choudhary, Bollywood and television actor
- Kirti Kulhari, Bollywood actress
- Mehdi Hassan, Pakistani gazal and playback singer
- Kulwant Khejroliya, Domestic cricketer. Only player from Jhunjhunu to play in Indian Premier League
- Salim Diwan, Bollywood actor
- Chhatrapal Singh, recipient of the Sena Medal

== See also ==
- Jhunjhunu
- Jhunjhunu Lok Sabha constituency
- Jhunjhunu Assembly constituency
