= Shardul Singh =

Ruler of Jhunjhunu

Shardul Singh Shekhawat
- Ruler of Jhunjhunu

Ruler of Jhunjhunu
- Born: 1681
- Died: 25 April 1742 (aged 60–61)
- Spouse: Sahaj Kanwar Biki; Sirey Kanwar Biki; Bakhat Kanwar Mertani
- Issue: Zorawar Singh; Kishan Singh; Bahadur Singh; Akhay Singh; Nawal Singh Bahadur; Keshri Singh
- House: Shekhawat

Maharao Shardul Singh ji Shekhawat (1681-1742) was the Shekhawat ruler of Jhunjhunu in Rajputana. During his reign, the Shekhawats are considered to have reached the height of their powers. After his death the estate was divided equally among his surviving five sons, whose descendants continued to rule over it until India achieved independence.

To commemorate their father, his sons constructed a chhatri decorated with frescoes at Parasrampura, the capital of Jhunjhunu. All five surviving sons subsequently administered portions of the estate. During their rule, new villages, towns, forts, and palaces were established, and merchants were encouraged to conduct trade. Merchants accumulated wealth during this period and constructed numerous havelis. Many of these havelis contain frescoes dating from this period. Moreover, the rich merchants made the wells, ponds, bawries (step well), temples and inns at various places. These structures are examples of the architecture of the period. The fresco-painting probably came into existence in the 18th century. Fresco painting became increasingly common in the region during Shardul Singh's reign.

== Personal life ==
Singh had three marriages. His first marriage was in 1698 to Thukrani Sahaj Kanwar Biki Ji Sahiba, the daughter of Manroop Singh Bika of Nathasar. His second marriage was to Thukrani Sirey Kanwar Biki Ji Sahiba, the daughter of Mukal Singh Bika of Nathasar. The third marriage was to Thukrani Bakhat Kanwar Mertani Ji Sahiba, the daughter of Devi Singh Mertiya of Poonglota (Marwar), near Degana and had children.

== Children ==
He had six sons:

- Thakur Zorawar Singh, (by 1st wife), born at Kant, married and had children. He died in 1745. He built Jorawargarh fort, ancestor of the families of Chowkari, Taen, Kalipahari, Malsisar, Gangiyasar, Mandrella, Sultana etc.
- Thakur Kishan Singh, (by 3rd wife), born in 1709, ancestor of the families of Khetri, Heerwa, Arooka, Seegra, Alsisar, etc.
- Kunwar Bahadur Singh, (by 3rd wife), born in 1712 and died in 1732.
- Thakur Akhay Singh, (by 3rd wife), born 1713, built Akhegarh Fort. Died without children in 1750.
- Thakur Nawal Singh Bahadur (by 3rd wife), born in 1715, ancestor of the families of Nawalgarh, Mahensar, Dorasar, Mukundgarh, Balonda, Jhunjhunu - pilani, Narsinghani, and Mandawa. He died on 24 February 1780.
- Thakur Keshri Singh, (by 3rd wife), born in 1728, ancestor of the families of Dundlod, Surajgarh, and Bissau. He was the 6th and youngest son and he died in 1768.

== Death ==
Shardul Singh died on 25 April 1742. Before his death, Singh decided to depart from the Rajput practice of primogeniture by dividing his estate among his sons.He declared that the Jhunjhunu estate would be divided equally among his sons. His son Bahadur Singh had died in his lifetime at an early age. As a result, his estate was divided into five equal shares. The administration by his five sons was cumulatively known as Panchpana (five divisions).
