= Panchpana =

Historical administrative division in Shekhawati, Rajasthan, India

Panchpana were the combined territories and thikanas ruled by the successors of Maharao Shardul Singh of Jhunjhunu, who belonged to the Bhojraj Ji Ka clan of Shekhawats. The Bhojraj Ji Ka Shekhawats ruled over two territories; Pentalisa and Panchpana. The Bhojraj Ji Ka clan of Shekhawats were the most prominent among the Shekhawat Rajputs. They built many magnificent forts in their thikanas. Panchpana thakurs ruled over highest number of thikanas in Shekhawati. Many thikanas had their own flags and emblems.

== History ==
Thakur Shardul Singh, a descendant of Rao Bhojraj Ji, conquered Jhunjhunu in 1730 from the Kayamkhani Nawabs. Shardul Singh had six sons, namely, Thakur Jorawar Singh, Thakur Kishan Singh, Thakur Bahadur Singh, Thakur Akhe Singh, Thakur Nawal Singh and Thakur Kesari Singh. Unfortunately, Bahadur Singh had expired in an early age. Later on Shardul Singh’s estate was divided into five equal shares among his five sons. These five shares were known as Panch Pana. Akhe Singh died without issue, so his share was given to the other brothers. Thakur Shardul Singh's sons and their descendants founded many new well planned and prosperous Thikanas.

1. (Descendants of Thakur Zorawar Singh): Chowkari, founded by Thakur Bakhat Singh in 1745, son of Thakur Zorawar Singh of Jhunjhunu. Site of a castle.
2. Malsisar, mahendra singh founded by Thakur Maha Singh in 1745, son of Thakur Zorawar Singh of Jhunjhunu, started the construction of Malsisar Fort in 1762.
3. Mandrella, founded by Thakur Daulat Singh in 1751/1791, third son of Thakur Zorawar Singh of Jhunjhunu. Site of a fort.
4. Chanana, founded by Thakur Ranjit Singh, son of Thakur Daulat Singh, he constructed the Fort of Chanana.
5. Gangiyasar, granted to Thakur Medh Singh. Site of a fort.
6. Taen the estate was founded by Thakur Salim Singh, son of Thakur Zorawar Singh of Jhunjhunu. Site of a fort.
7. Sirohi, founded by Thakur Salim Singh, son of Thakur Zorawar Singh of Jhunjhunu. Site of a fort.
8. Dabdi Dheer Singh, founded by Thakur Kirat Singh, son of Thakur Zorawar Singh of Jhunjhunu.
9. Sultana, Granted to Thakur Hathi Singh, son of Thakur Zorawar Singh of Jhunjhunu.
10. (Descendants of Thakur Kishan Singh): Khetri, founded by Thakur Kishan Singh in 1742, second largest Thikana in Jaipur after Sikar. Site of the kaleidoscopic Bhopalgarh Fort, Bagore Fort and a Palace. Thakur Bhopal Singh constructed the Khetri Mahal in 1770.
11. Alsisar I, site of a fort, founded by Thakur Chattar Singh in 1853.
12. Alsisar II, founded by Thakur Ganpat Singh in 1853.
13. Heerwa, Ghanshyam Singh s/o sh vijay singh founded by Thakur Ramnath Singh. Thakur Pahar Singh constructed the fort of Heerwa in 1763.
14. Sigra, founded by Thakur Mehtab Singh, site of a small Castle.
15. Arooka, site of a fort, the estate was founded by Thakur Duleha Singh in 1796.
16. Badangarh, site of a fort, the estate was founded by Thakur Badan Singh.
17. (Descendants of Thakur Nawal Singh): Nawalgarh, founded by Thakur Nawal Singh in 1737 at the village site of Rohili. Nawalgarh has two forts, Bala Kila Fort, built in 1737, and Fatehgarh or Kachiagarh Fort, as well as Roop Niwas Palace.
18. Mandawa, founded in 1791 by the third and fourth sons of Thakur Narsinghdas of Nawalgarh in 1791. Castle Mandawa was built by Thakur Nawal Singh, in 1755.
19. Mahensar, founded in 1768 by Thakur Nahar Singh, second son of Thakur Nawal Singh of Nawalgarh. Mahensar has a magnificent castle.
20. Balonda, Jhunjhunu, pilani and Baloda both thikana founded by Thakur dalel singh ji shekhawat, son of Thakur Nawal Singhji of Nawalgarh and grandson of Raja Shardul Singh Ji Shekhawat ruler of Jhunjhunu. Thakur dalel singh ji built dalelgarh fort 1824 in his capital dalelgarh(pilani).fought mandan war in 1832 with bravery.
21. Parasrampura, founded by Thakur Bhawani Singh, son of Thakur Nahar Singh. Site of a small Castle.
22. Mukundgarh, site of a fort, the estate founded by Thakur Mukand Singh in 1859, son of Thakur Nathu Singh of Nawalgarh.
23. Dorasar, founded by Kunwar Prem Singh.
24. Pacheri, founded by Kunwar Prem Singh.
25. Ismailpur
26. Jakoda
27. Kolinda etc.
28. (Descendants of Thakur Kesari Singh); Bissau, founded by Thakur Kesari Singh, who constructed the Bissau Fort and defensive boundary in 1746 and Thakur Surajmal Singh of Bissau constructed the Surajgarh Fort in 1778. Dundlod, also founded by Thakur Kesari Singh, constructed Dundlod Fort in 1750. The fort has the majestic Diwan Khana.
