= Kalipahari =

Kalipahari Thikana Panchpaana (jorawar singh)
- village
- Location in jhunjhunu Rajasthan, India Kalipahari (India)
- Coordinates: 28°8′18″N 75°30′12″E
- Country: India
- State: Rajasthan
- District: Jhunjhunu

Languages
  - Official: Hindi
- Time zone: UTC+5:30 (IST)
- PIN: 333024
- ISO 3166 code: RJ-IN
- BAGAR: Jhunjhunu, Chirawa
- Lok Sabha constituency: Jhunjhunu

Kalipahari village is a big community of Shekhawat Rajputs in the Jhunjhunu District of Rajasthan. It is situated 5 km south of Bagar, Jhunjhunu. The village is famous for the frescos on its grand havelis.

Shekhawats ([[Thakur Zorawar Singh Ji Ka [Thakur Zorawar Singh, (by 1st wife), born at Kant, married and had children. He died in 1745. He built Jorawargarh fort, ancestor of the families of Chowkari, Taen, Kalipahari, Malsisar, Gangiyasar, Mandrella, Sultana etc.] ]]) (Panchpana) are a major part of the population. Almost 25% of the young generation of this village work in the armed forces, police, a paramilitary organization or civil services. It was established by Thakur Sangram Singh in the earlier 18th century and basically the roots of Kalipahari are connected to the village of Tain, Shekhawati, near Bissau, Rajasthan.

== Demographics of Kali Pahari ==
There are three parts in this village: the main village, Kalipahari ka Bas, and Kalipahari ki Dhani. Shekhawats Rajput are the main part of the population of Kalipahari.

Hindi and Bagri are the local languages here.

== Events ==
One of the many different important events in Kalipahari is the festival of Gangaur, Holi arranged by the Rajput families.

== Transport ==
=== By rail ===
Ratan Shahar railway station (3 kilometres) and Jhunjhunu railway station (10 kilometres) are the closest railway stations to Kali Pahari. Jhunjhunu comes within the territory of the North Western Railway. Jhunjhunu city is connected through a broadgauge line to Sikar, Rewari and Delhi.

=== By road ===
Kalipahari is near to city of Jhunjhunu, which is well connected by road to all the major cities of Rajasthan. RJ-SH 8 links Jhunjhunu to Jaipur, Sikar and Luharu. RJ-SH 41 links Fatehpur to Rajgarh via Jhunjhunun

=== By air ===
The nearest airport to Kalipahari village is Jaipur International Airport (Jaipur). Beside that, a small air strip is also available in Jhunjhunu for small private planes to land.
