= Balonda, Jhunjhunu =

Baloda
- Village
- Location within Rajasthan
- Coordinates (28.364819, 75.886688): 28°22′7.49″N 75°52′49.31″E
- Country: India
- State: Rajasthan
- District: Jhunjhunu
- Subdistrict: Surajgarh
- Time zone: UTC+05:30 (IST)
- Pincode: 333033
- ISO 3166 code: RJ-IN

Balonda is a village in the Indian state of Rajasthan. Its mandal is Surajgarh and district is Jhunjhunu. It is located 17.7 kilometres (11.0 mi) from Surajgarh, 54.2 kilometres (33.7 mi) from Jhunjhunu, and 157 kilometres (98 mi) from Jaipur.

== History ==
Baloda established 1505 AD by Jat (Balwada gotar) and Thakur Dalel Singh ji come here in 1775 AD.

Earlier Baloda was a Thikana under jaipur state.Baloda Thikana was established by Raj Shree Thakur Dalel Singh Ji Shekhawat, and named after Baloda Gotra of Jats. Thakur Dalel Singh Ji Shekhawat was the first Jagirdar/Thikanedar of Baloda Thikana with other village jagir.who migrated from pilani (dalelgarh) fort. Pilani and baloda both thikana founded by Thakur dalel singh ji shekhawat. He was the son of Raj Shree Thakur Nawal Singh ji Shekhawat of Nawalgarh and grandson of Shri Raja Shardul Singh Ji Shekhawat ruler ofJhunjhunu. Shekhawat Jagirdar of Baloda Thikana are Thakur Bhojraj Ji clan shardulsinghot subclan panchpana.

The village has a big Anaj Mandi. Other castes include Shekhawat Rajput, baloda Jat, Gujjar, Brahmin, Bania, Kumhar, Sunar, Meghwal, khati, Nayak, bhopa, Banwariya, Gunwariya, Nai, Purohit, Rawana Rajput, Muslim teli, Muslim lohar, Hindu lohar, Sawami, Dakot, etc.

== Infrastructure ==
The village has a Bank of Baroda branch. It is well connected with Buhana Chirawa, Satnali, Jhunjhunu. The village has a direct bus service to Jaipur. The nearest railway station is Satnali (Haryana) which is 16 km from Balonda. Balonda touches the Haryana Border at Dhana and Satnali. Currently Smt. Manoj soni is Sarpanch of baloda.

== Temples ==
The village has 13 main temples:

- Shree jamwai mata ji Temple (kuldevi shekhawat Rajpariwar)
- Shree baba bhani nath ji maharaj Temple
- Shree Baba Karni Nath ji maharaj Temple
- Shree Khet ka Balaji, Hospital Road
- Shree baba udaidas ji Temple
- Shree bujannath ji Temple
- Shree sitla mata ji Temple
- Shree durga mata ji Temple
- Shree sati mata ji Temple
- Shree gogaji maharaj Temple
- Shree shanidev ji Temple
- Shree Balaji Temple
- Shree Shiv ji Temple

== Education ==
A government Senior Secondary School with Arts faculty is available. Sarpanch Shree Sardar Singh Shekhawat helped upgrade the village school to a secondary school in 1966 and invited Chief Minister Sh. Sukhadia for the village.

=== Schools ===
- Government Senior Secondary School, Balonda
- IT centre, Balonda
- Aadarsh Public School

=== Colleges ===
- Umrao Singh Arya College Buhana
- Government College, Chirawa
- Savitri Devi Girls College
- SVM College Jaisinghwas
