= Raisal of Khandela =

Raja Raisal Darbari (Rao Raisal)
- Raja and Darbari
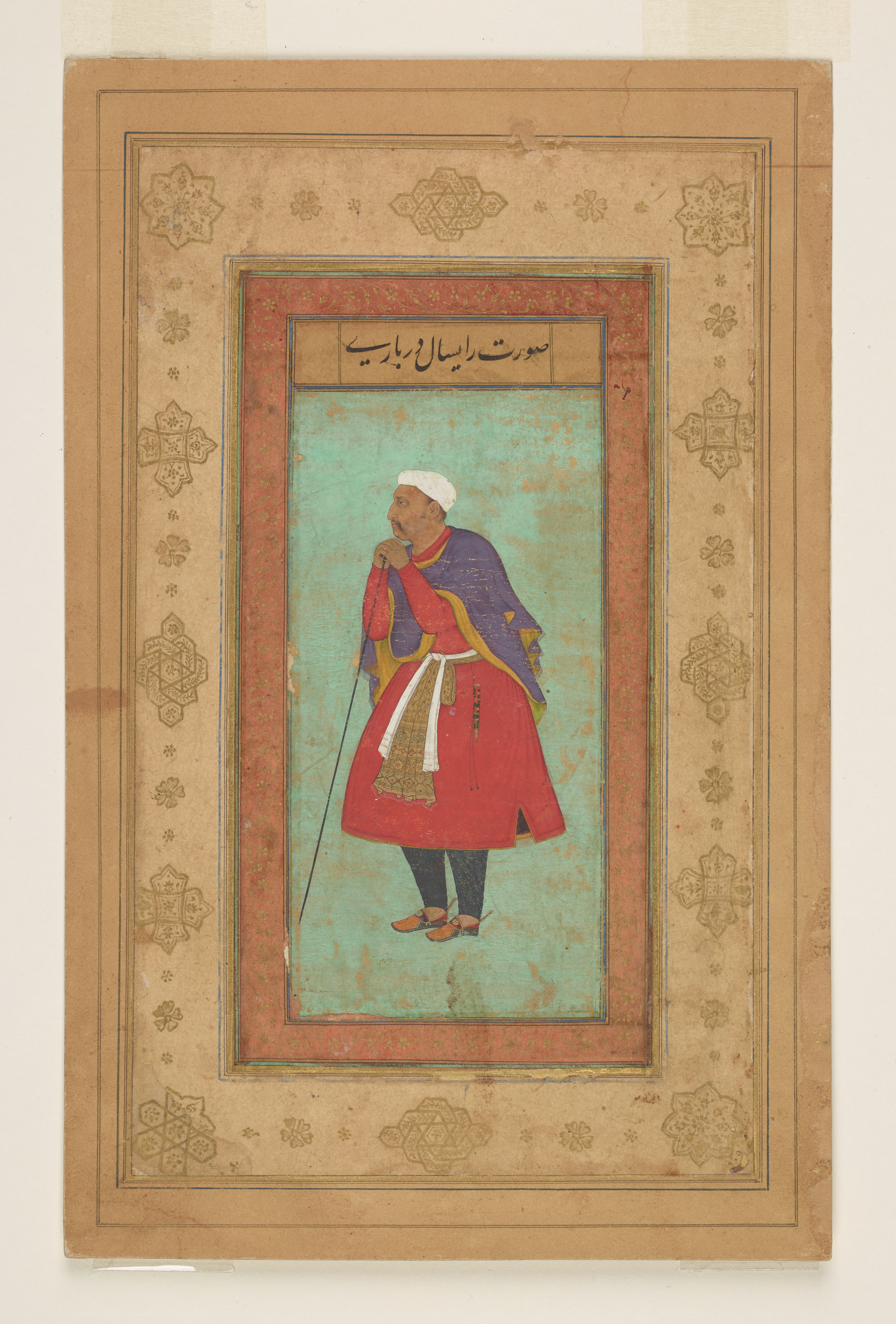
- Raisal of Khandela in Mughal miniature. Chester Beatty Library
- Successor: Raja Girdhar Das Khandela
- Born: B.S. 1595-falgun vadi 8 (A.D.1538), Amarsar
- Died: 1614; Burhanpur
- Consort: Princess Kisnavati of Khandela
- Wives: Rani Kesar Kumari, daughter of Raja Lakhdheer Badgujar of Devati.; Rani Kisnawati, only daughter of Raja Peetha Nirban, the Raja of Khandela.; Rani Mertanji.; Rani Hansa Kumari of Jodhpur Royal Family, daughter of Rao Jagmal of Merta, committed sati in 1614.; Rani Lad Kanwar, daughter of Raja Kumbha Gaur of Maroth.; Rani Indrawati, daughter of Rao Man Singh Songara of Pali.
- Issue: 12 sons
- House: Shekhawat
- Dynasty: Shekhawat, Kachwaha (Amber/Jaipur State)
- Father: Rao Suja Ji, ruler of Amarsar
- Mother: Rani Ratan Kanwar Rathore Ji

Raja Raisal, also known as the Raisal of Khandela, was the ruler of Khandela in modern-day Rajasthan, India from 1584 to 1614. Raisal married Chauhan Rajput Princess Kisnavati Nirban, the only daughter of Raja Peetha Nirban of Khandela and thus, was also the 1st Shekhawat Raja of Khandela. Son of Maharao Suja of Amarsar, was granted the estate (jagir) of 7 villages in Lamiya on death of his father, thereupon he joined Imperial Service at Delhi where he was granted the title of "Raja" also a title of "Darbari" and a Mansab of 1250 sawars which was later raised to 3000 by Emperor Akbar. He died about 1614 in South India. He was great-grandson of MahaRao Shekha, King of Amarsar and he belonged to the Kachwaha Clan of Amber/Jaipur Royal Family. The Shekhawats ruled over the Shekhawati region for over 500 years and are honoured with the hereditary title of "Tazimi Sirdars," whom the Maharaja of Jaipur receives by rising from his seat.

== Descendants ==
- Maharao Shekha, the ruler of Amarsar, son of Rao Mokal of Amber Royal Family and his Queen, a Nirban Chauhan Princess of Khetri.
  - Maharao Raimal, (by Rani Chauhan ji, daughter of Rao Sheobramha of Chobara Alwar), the ruler of Amarsar.
    - Maharao Suja, the ruler of Amarsar.
      - Rao Lunkaran, the ruler of Amarsar.
      - Raja Rao Gopal ji sujawat, thakur of 52 and half villages of shekhawati, also had jagir of fatehpur from akbar. He was elder full brother of Raisal ji
      - Rao Bhairudas ji, forefather of Bhairu ji ka sept, his son narhardas founded Thikana Loharu in haryana
      - Rao Chanda ji, forefather of Chandapota sept
      - Raja Raisal Darbari (1st Shekhawat Raja of Khandela), son of Rao Suja Ji (by Rani Ratan Kunwari Rathore) born 1595 V.S.; received small 7 village Jagir of Lamiya from paternal state Amarsar. He got associated with Badshah Akbar and managed the security of his Royal Palace with 500 Rajput soldiers under him. He fought various battles under him including Sarnal, Kherabad and Patan. [Akbarnama, page 333, 382, 416] He was awarded the Title of RAJA by Akbar and had a Mansabdari of 3000. [Aine Akbari (Eng) page 462] He conquered the 4 parganas of Khandela, Udaipur(vati), Raiwasa and Kasli from Nirbans and Chandels, and they were recognised by Akbar as his Watan Jagir (Hereditary Personal State). Other than that he also had Jagirs of Mansab. He married and had issue, 12 sons, of whom 7 continued his lineage, and are called "Raisalot Shekhawats".
        - Rajkumar Ladkhan or Lada or Lal Singh, ancestor of the "Ladkhani" sept of the Shekhawat sub-clan of Rewasa, Khachariawas, Ramgadh, Lamiya, Bajyawas, Dhingpur; Lalsari, Bardwa, Hudeel (in maroth); Tarapur, Khuri, Niradhanu, Khoru, Khatu(shyamji) were their Jagirs.
        - Raja Hariram Ji (Yuvraj of Khandela) – He was the elder son of Rajkumari Kisnavati, only daughter of Raja Peetha Nirban of Khandela; he married and had issue, six sons. Thikanas of Mundru, Dadiya, Jethi, Lasadiya, Abhawas, etc. Khandela was usurped from his widows and children by his step-brother Girdhardas.
        - Rajkumar Termal (Rao Tirmal) granted title of Rao, and the parganas of Nagore and Kasli (+84 villages); ancestor of ‘Rao ji Ka’ Sept of Shekhawats.
        - Rajkumar Bhojraj (Rao Bhojraj) – born 1624 VS, later became Mansabdar as ruler of Udaiur(vati) pargana, 45 villages and also Ketri, Surajgadh, Bissau, Nawalgadh, Mandawra, Harduja, Mehi, Methoi, Kari, Ikhtiarpura, Pabana, Sakhoo; Chanwra, Mau, Jalpali, Nangal, Bhim, Puspuria, Dhani; Mukandgarh, Mahansar, Chokri, Malsisar, Alsisar, Nawalgarh, Baloda (Pilani) Mandawa, Sarwari, and Sikar; ancestor of Bhojraj Ji Ka sept of Shekhawat sub-clan.
        - Rajkumar Parshuram (Parasram/Puras Ram) of Bae.
        - Rajkumar Tejsi (Kunwar Tajsi or Tej Singh) - he died sp.
        - Raja Girdhardas (Raja Girdhar Singh), 7th son of Raja Raisal, usurped Khandela from step-brother's kins. Danta, Khood are also their thikanas.
        - Rajkumar Bihari - the younger son of Rani Kisnavati, he died childless in battle.
        - Rajkumar Veerbhan - died in battle.
        - Rajkumar Kusla (Kushala) - died in battle.
        - Rajkumar Dayaldas - died childless.
        - Rajkumar Babu (of Khawas) - died in battle.
        - Rao Gangaram of Kasli, died at Renwal.
        - Rani Laadi Kanwar Ji Sahiba, married Rao Amar Singh Rathore of Nagour, son of Maharaja Gaj Singh I of Jodhpur. She became sati 26 July 1644.

== See also ==
- Shekhawat
- Shekhawati
- Thikanas of Shekhawati
- Khandela
