= Kabeersar =

- Location in Rajasthan, India
- Coordinates: 28.186445°N 75.148089°E
- Country: India
- State: Rajasthan
- District: Jhunjhunun

Languages
  - Official: Hindi and shekhawati
- Time zone: UTC+5:30 (IST)
- PIN: 331027
- Vehicle registration: RJ-18

Kabeersar is a village in Jhunjhunun, Rajasthan, India. Its population as of the 2011 census was 705.

== Location ==
Jhunjhunu, Bissau, Churu, and Mandawa are nearby cities.

== Demographics ==
The village has two parts: the main village, Kabeersar, and Kabeersar ka baas. Hindus make up the main part of the population of Kabeersar. Hindi and Rajasthani/Bagri language are spoken here.

== Transport ==
By rail

Jhunjhunun and Bissau Railway Station are the closest railway stations to Kabeersar. Jhunjhunu is within the territory of the North Western Railway. Jhunjhunu city is connected through a broad-gauge line to Sikar, Rewari, and Delhi.

By road

Kabeersar is near the cities Jhunjhanu, Bissau and Mandawa. Jhunjhunu is well connected by roads from all the major cities of Rajasthan. RJ-SH 8 links Jhunjhunu to Jaipur, Sikar and Luharu. RJ-SH 41 links Fatehpur to Rajgarh via Jhunjhunun.

By air

The nearest airport to Kabeersar village is Jaipur International Airport (Jaipur). Beside that, a small air strip is also available in Jhunjhunu for small private planes.

== Nearby attractions ==
- Mahadev Mahakal Kabeersar 0 km.
- Rani Sati Temple 3.6 km.
- Neelkanth Mahadev Bissau, Rajasthan 18 km.
- Mandawa 18 km.
- Shree RaiMata Mandir Gangiyasar 12 km.
