= Rahdon Ka Bas =

Village in Jhunjhunu (Rajasthan), India

Rahdon ka bas राहड़ो का बास
- Village
- Location within Rajasthan
- Coordinates: 28.2180°N 75.2845°E
- Country: India
- State: Rajasthan
- District: Jhunjhunu
- Time zone: UTC+5:30 (IST)
- PIN: 333011
- Telephone Code: +911595

Rahdon ka bas is small village of Ladusar Gram panchayat. Rahdon ka bas is located in Alsisar panchayat samiti malsisar tehsil of Jhunjhunu district in Rajasthan, India. PIN code number of Rahdon ka bas is 333011. The population of Rahdon ka bas was 617 in 2011.
