= Kuharu =

- Village
- Location in Rajasthan, India Kuharu (India)
- Coordinates: 28.05°N 75.8°E
- Country: India
- State: Rajasthan
- District: Jhunjhunun
- Elevation: 316 m (1,037 ft)

Population (2001)
  - Total: 2,071

Languages
  - Official: Hindi
- Time zone: UTC+5:30 (IST)
- PIN: 333704
- ISO 3166 code: RJ-IN
- Vehicle registration: RJ-18

Kuharu is a village in Mandawa, Jhunjhunu district of Rajasthan in India. It is part of the Shekhawati region. Kuharu is situated 195 km off Jaipur in the north. The town lies between latitude 28°.06’ in the north and longitude 75°.8’ in the east.
