= Chainpura, Jhunjhunu =

Village in Rajasthan, India

Chainpura चैनपुरा
- village
- Location within Rajasthan
- Coordinates: 28.2180°N 75.2845°E
- Country: India
- State: Rajasthan
- District: Jhunjhunu district
- Tehsil: Malsisar
- Time zone: UTC+5:30 (IST)
- PIN: 333011

Chainpura is a small village of Ladusar Gram Panchayat.Chainpura village is located in Alsisar Taluka and Malsisar Tehsil of Jhunjhunu district in Rajasthan, India. The pin code number of Chainpura is 333011. The population of Chainpura is 747 in 2011.
