= Tetara =

Village in Rajasthan, India

Coordinates: 28.04853814°N 75.17564483°E

Tetara is a village in Jhunjhunu District of Rajasthan, India, situated 1 km from Mandawa and 25 km from Jhunjhunu. The nearby villages of this place are in South Hanumanpura, Kisari, Meethwas, in West Mandawa, North Bajisar and East Chandrapura.

== Demographics ==
The village code as per the 2011 census of India is 00686300.

| Total Population | 1511 |
| Male Population | 782 |
| Female Population | 729 |
| Total Household Number | 257 |

Tetara village is situated near Delhi Bikaner State Highways No. 41. The village is covered by two side roads for Jhunjhunu headquarters. A link road connects both roads.

== About the Place ==
The Thakur ji Maharaj Temple is the oldest Temple - nearly 100 years old in the heart of the village where Lord Krishna with Radha Rani is blessing to the citizens. Another newly built temple of Shri Balaji Maharaj is also an attraction of the village. The Village is a destination of Bollywood filmmakers. The shooting of major parts of movies like "PK", or Bajarangi Bhaijan has been done in this village.

== Fairs and festivals ==
The inter - District Cricket Competition called "Godamedi Cricket Pritiyogita" will be organized on the occasion of Goga Navami. The tournament has been organized by a committee constituted for management of tournament and selected by the fellow citizens. The Student Club Student Club, Jhunjhunu is Won this year (2019). The IPLIPL Cricket Player Kulwant Khejroliya was the honored guest for this years.
