= Shobha Ka Bas =

Shobha Ka Bas शोभा का बास
- village
- Location within Rajasthan
- Coordinates: 28.2483°N 75.2914°E
- Country: India
- State: Rajasthan
- District: Jhunjhunu district
- Tehsil: Malsisar
- Time zone: UTC+5:30 (IST)
- PIN: 333011
- Telephone code: +91595

Shobha Ka Bas is a small village in Alsisar Panchayat Samiti and Malsisar Tehsil of Jhunjhunu district in Rajasthan, India. Its PIN code number is 333011. The population was 768 in 2011.
