= Tain, Shekhawati =

Tain Taen, Tanee
- Village
- Nickname: classic village
- Location in Rajasthan, India
- Coordinates: 28.1828723°N 75.1239109°E
- Country: India
- State: Rajasthan
- District: Jhunjhunu
- Established: 1761
- Founder: TH.Salim Singh

Government
  - Body: Gram Panchayat

Languages
  - Official: Hindi
- Time zone: UTC+5:30 (IST)
- PIN: 331027
- Telephone code: 01595

Tain is a village in the Jhunjhunu district, India. It is part of the Shekhawati region of Rajasthan.

== About the village ==
Tain lies 15 km to the north of Mandawa town in the Jhunjhunu district, bounded by the districts of Sikar and Churu. It is a former estate of 12 villages founded in 1761 by Thakur Sahib Salem Singhji the grandson of Maharao Sardul Singh, a ruler of Jhunjhunu. Tain estate has a very turbulent history going back more than 250 years. There have been many upheavals, as is evident from the state of its historical monuments. The Shekhawati Brigade, a cavalry regiment under the command of Major Henry Forster, inflicted major damage on Tain's fort in the 1830s. The regiment was formed and raised to specifically target and bring to book the so-called "Rogue" rulers, chieftains and Thikanas of Shekhawati, who refused to pay allegiance to the Jaipur State and its British overlords. The majority of the Shekhawat rulers were opposed to their cousins, the larger Jaipur State and the British.

== Demographics ==
Tain village has a population of around 5,000. It is primarily divided into three parts, according to an old custom of social hierarchy: Tain Garh is home mainly to Rajputs; Tain Johad is home to Jats and other peasant farming communities; and Tain Baas has a mainly Qaimkhani population.

Many of the villagers are serving or have served in the armed or paramilitary forces. Most of the people are dependent on agriculture, dairy, poultry farming and related activities for their livelihood. Tain is well connected to all major district roads (metalled). There is better open spaces and greenery is far better than other near location to the TAIN, and it has a BSNL telephone exchange and an electric sub-station. It is administered by a Gram Panchayat, which is democratically elected every 5 years.

== History ==
In 1730 Jhunjhunu was seized by Thakur Shardul Singh (ruled 1730–1742) after the death of the ruling Nawab, Rohella Khan.

Under Maharao Shardul Singh, Jhunjhunu was the richest and most powerful estate of the Shekhawati region. After Maharao Shardul's demise in 1742, the estate was divided equally among his five surviving sons, Zorawar Singh, Kishen Singh, Akhey Singh, Nawal Singh and Keshri Singh. Jhunjhunu thus came to be known as the Panchpana – the five estates. Akhey died without leaving an heir. Zorawar inherited Tain, Gangiyasar, Mandrella and Malsisar; Kishen got Khetri and Alsisar; Thakur Nawal singh founded Nawalgarh, Mandawa, Keshri Bissau & Surajgarh and Dundlod. The thakurs of every village in the region covered by Panchpana were all descended from one of these men.

Tain was a flourishing town in the eighteenth century and till early part of the nineteenth century. It was founded by Thakur Salem Singh (Grandson of Maharao Shardul Singh and son of the eldest Rao Zorawar Singh) in 1761 and the fort was completed in 1769, a square structure with four corner bastions. This town was one of the several that fell within Shyam Singh of Bissau’s orbit and was notorious for dacoities and banditry. When the Shekhawati Brigade cavalry Regiment under Major Forster sliced the fort in 1837, the Bissau family took away the great gates for their own fort. The walls were never rebuilt. Only two bastions remained, with the gate in a precarious state. Near the fort is a kothi (mansion) built by Moti Singh Karnawat (Musahibs/caretakers of the Estate) in 1846. It has beautiful frescoes but is in a poor state of repair.

One of the oldest Monastery " mutt" of the Nath Sampradaya/ sect in India is located at Tain village. There is a legend that there is a tunnel from this ancient monastery of monk Shri Kesarnathji right up to Deedwana, through which monks used to pick up salt. There are traces of a few jal trees from which, according to legend, there used to be rain of sugar granules.

Thakur JAI SINGH of Tain and Thakur SURAJ MAL of Bissau lost their lives in The Battle of Tunga (Madhogarh) in the year 1787 valiantly fighting against the Marathas led by Mahadji Scindhia. Sirohi Village near Neem-Ka-Thana in Sikar district, is the location of a Hill fort that was part of Tain estate. Some of the prominent villages that were part of Tain Estate were Lutu, Bhorki, Kali pahari, Mojas etc.

== Gallery ==
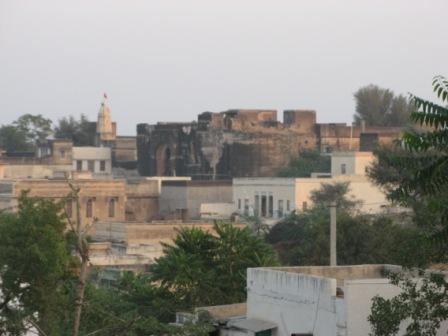
Picture of Historic Tain Fort

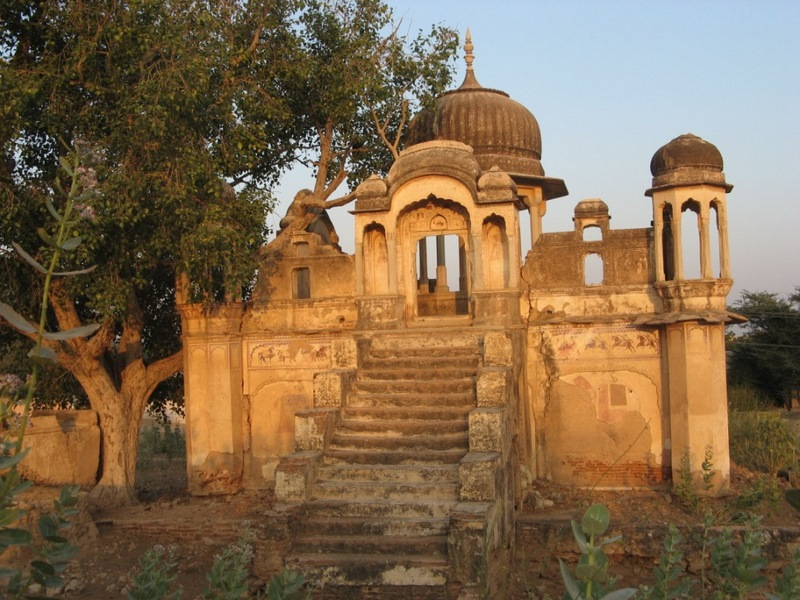
Cenotaph at village Tain

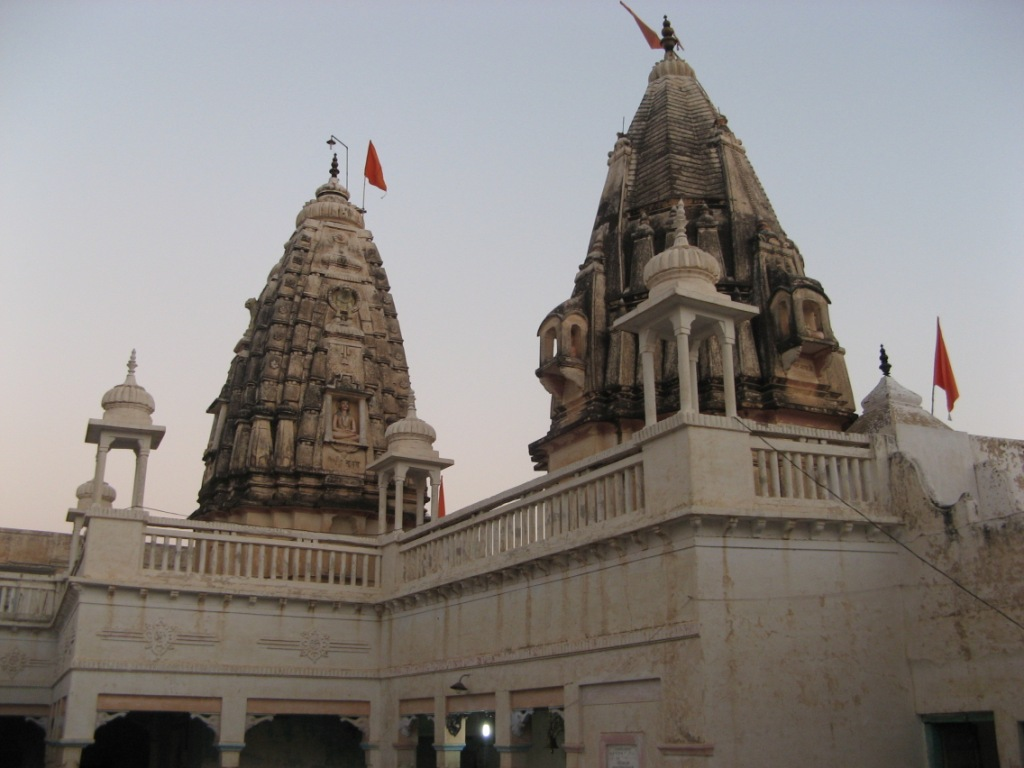
Temple with Stone carvings inside the ancient Kesarnathji Monastery (NATH sect) at village Tain.

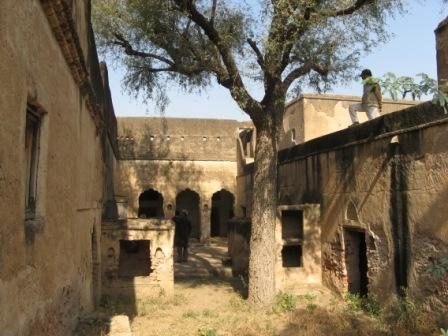
Estd.1761

== See also ==
- Location Map
