= Kodesar =

- Village
- Location in Rajasthan, India Kodesar (India)
- Coordinates: 28.265°N 75.19°E
- Country: India
- State: Rajasthan
- District: Jhunjhunun

Government
  - Body: Gram Panchayat
- Elevation: 292 m (958 ft)

Population (2001)
  - Total: 1,150

Languages
  - Official: Hindi
- Time zone: UTC+5:30 (IST)
- Postal code: 331027
- Area code: 91-1595-
- ISO 3166 code: RJ-IN
- Vehicle registration: RJ18

Kodesar is a village and a Gram Panchayat in Jhunjhunu district in the state of Rajasthan, India.

== Geography ==
Kodesar is located at 28.265°N 75.19°E. It has an average elevation of 292 metres (958 feet).

It is about 35 km from Jhunjhunu, 27 km from Churu and 13 km from nearest city Bissau, Rajasthan

== Demographics ==
As of 2001 India census, Kodesar had a population of 1,150. Males constitute 49.56% of the population and females 50.44%. Kodesar has a sex ratio of 1017, higher than the national sex ratio of 940 females on average on per 1000 males.
