= Dhadhar =

Dhadhar is a village in Churu tehsil in Churu district in the state of Rajasthan, India.

== Demographics ==
The Census of India, 2011 recorded a population of 2,959 persons in 544 households.

== Geography ==
The village is located within the Shekhawati desert region of northern Rajasthan.

== Education ==
There are four government schools - three primary and one secondary - and one senior secondary private school. There are five temples (Goga Medi, Shiv ji, Kali Maa, Balaji, Krishan ji).
