= Chainpura =

Chainpura may refer to:

- Chainpura, Bharatpura
- Chainpura, Jhunjhunu
