= Thakur Nawal Singh =

Thakur Nawal Singh ji Bahadur
- Thakur and Bahadur (Tazimi)
- Reign: Nawalgarh and Mandawa in Shekhawati
- Successor: Thakur Narsinghdas Ji Nawalgarh Thakur Naharsingh Ji Mahansar Thakur Dalelsingh Ji Pilani-Baloda
- Born: 1715 AD
- Died: 24 February 1780
- Consort: 4 Thakuranis
- Wives: Thakurani Udawatji; Thakurani Bikawatji; Thakurani Champawatji; Thakurani Bikawatji
Names
- Thakur Shri Nawal Singh Shekhawat Ji Saheb Bahadur
- House: Bala Kila Fort(Nawalgarh), Mandawa fort(Mandawa)
- Dynasty: Shekhawat sub-clan of Kachwaha Dynasty (Amber/Jaipur State)
- Father: Thakur Shardul Singh
- Mother: Thukrani Bakhat Kanwar Mertani Ji Sahiba (3rd wife of Thakur Shadul Singh)

Thakur Shri Nawal Singh Shekhawat Ji Saheb Bahadur (1742—1780) was the ruler of Nawalgarh and Mandawa, born in 1715, he was fifth son of Thakur Shardul Singh of Jhunjhunu, and his third wife, Thakurani Bakhat Kanwar, he was granted the title of Bahadur and a mansab of 3000 zat and 2000 sawars in 1775, built Bala Kila Fort and Fatehgarh Fort both in Nawalgarh, built Dalelgarh Fort in Dalelgarh, later renamed Pilani, he also built Mandawa Fort in Mandawa.

== Wives ==
- Thakurani Udawatji, daughter of Thakur Sangram Singh, and granddaughter of Thakur Sabal Singh of Deh in Nagour,
- Thakurani Bikawatji, daughter of Thakur Himmat Singh, and granddaughter of Thakur Man Singh of Dadrewa in Bikaner,
- Thakurani Champawatji, daughter of Thakur Hindu Singh, and granddaughter of Thakur Amar Singh of Auwa in Jodhpur,
- Thakurani Bikawatji, daughter of Thakur Devi Singh, and granddaughter of Thakur Mokal Singh of Bhadonda,
