= D. K. Taknet =

Indian historian and biographer (born 1958)

- Born: 11 April 1958 (age 68); Shekhawati, Rajasthan, India
- Education: University of Rajasthan (MPhil)
- Occupations: Historian; biographer

D. K. Taknet (born 11 April 1958, in Shekhawati) is an Indian historian and biographer, best known for his books Industrial Entrepreneurship of Shekhawati Marwaris (1986), B. M. Birla: A Great Visionary (1996), Jaipur: Gem Of India (2013), and The Marwari Heritage (2015), which cover the history and culture of Rajasthan, particularly that of the Marwari people and the Birla family. He has a Master of Philosophy from the University of Rajasthan.
