= Ajit Singh of Khetri =

Maharaja of Khetri from 1870–1901

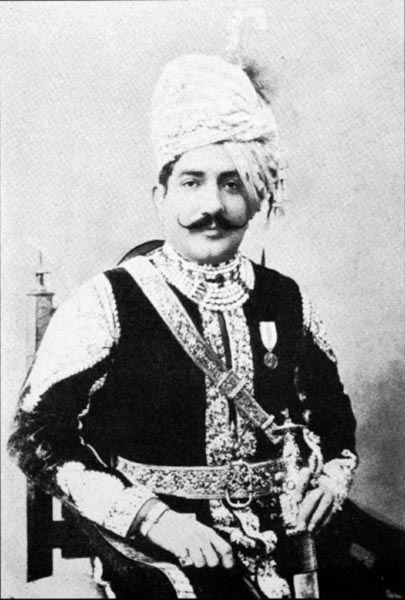
- Ajit Singh
- Coronation: 1870
- Predecessor: Raja Fateh Singh
- Successor: Raja Jai Singh Bahadur
- Born: 16 October 1861; Alsisar, Panchpana Territory, Shekhawati Region, Rajputana Agency
- Died: 18 January 1901 (aged 39); Agra, North-Western Provinces
- Burial: Mathura, Uttar Pradesh
- Consort: Rani Champawatiji Sahiba
- Issue: Surya Kumari (daughter, 1882–1913); Chandra Kumari (daughter, born 17 January 1889); Jai Singh (son, 1893–1910)
Names
- Maharaja Ajit Singh Bahadur
- Dynasty: Shekhawat
- Father: Thakur Chattu Singh
- Religion: Hinduism

Raja Ajit Singh Bahadur (16 October 1861 – 18 January 1901) was the ruler of the Shekhawat estate (thikana) of Khetri at Panchpana in Rajasthan between 1870 and 1901. He was born on 16 October 1861 at Alsisar. His father was Thakur Chattu Singh, a resident of Alsisar. Ajit Singh was later adopted to Khetri and after the death of Fateh Singh, he became the eighth king of Khetri in 1870. In 1876, he married Rani Champawatiji Sahiba and the couple had one son and two daughters. He died on 18 January 1901 due to an accident at the tomb of Akbar in Sikandra near Agra and was cremated at Mathura.

Ajit Singh was a close friend and disciple of Swami Vivekananda. He suggested him to keep the name 'Vivekananda' instead of Sachidananda, which he used before. Swami Vivekananda went to Khetri and met Ajit Singh thrice in his lifetime— in 1891, 1893 and 1897. Ajit Singh is known for providing financial support to Vivekananda, and encouraging him to speak at the Parliament of the World's Religions at Chicago in 1893.

From 1891 Ajit Singh started sending monthly stipend of ₹ 100 to Vivekanada's family in Kolkata. On 1 December 1898 Vivekananda wrote a letter to Ajit Singh from Belur in which he requested him to make the donation permanent so that even after Vivekananda's death his mother (Bhuvaneswari Devi 1841–1911) gets the financial assistance on a regular basis. The letter archive of Khetri reveals he had frequent communication with the family members of Vivekananda.

== Biography ==
=== Early life and background of a king ===
Ajit Singh was born on 16 October 1861 at the Shekhawat estate of Alsisar in Northern Rajasthan. His father was Thakur Chattu Singh, a resident of Alsisar. Singh's mother was the daughter of the Thakur of Nimaj in Jodhpur.

=== Accession to the throne ===
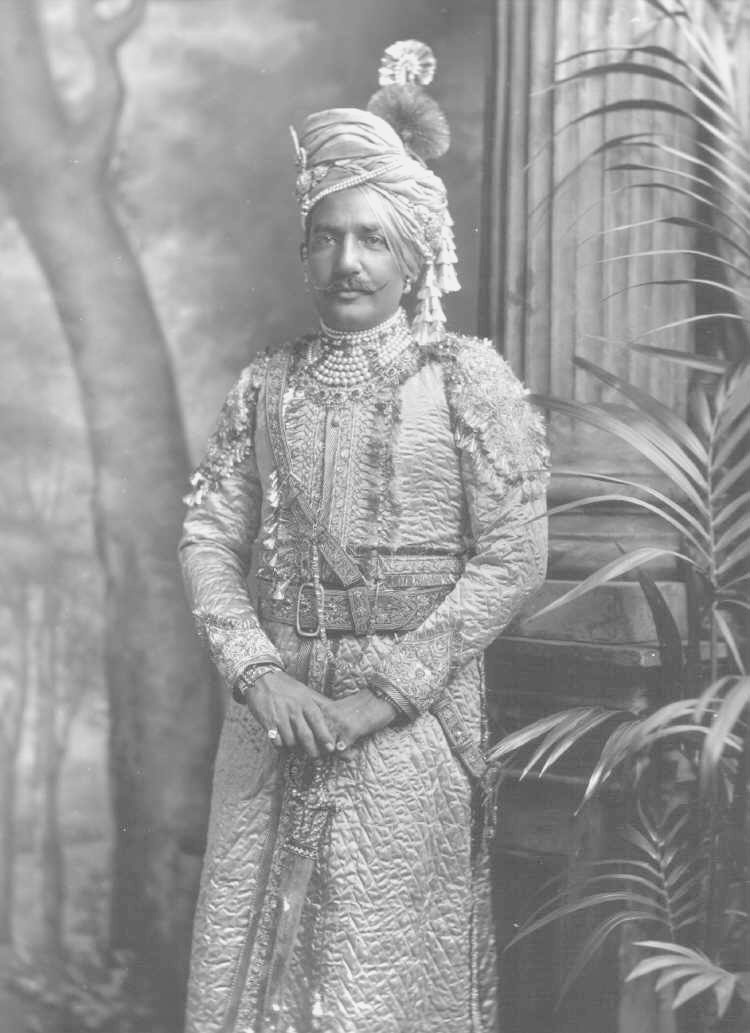
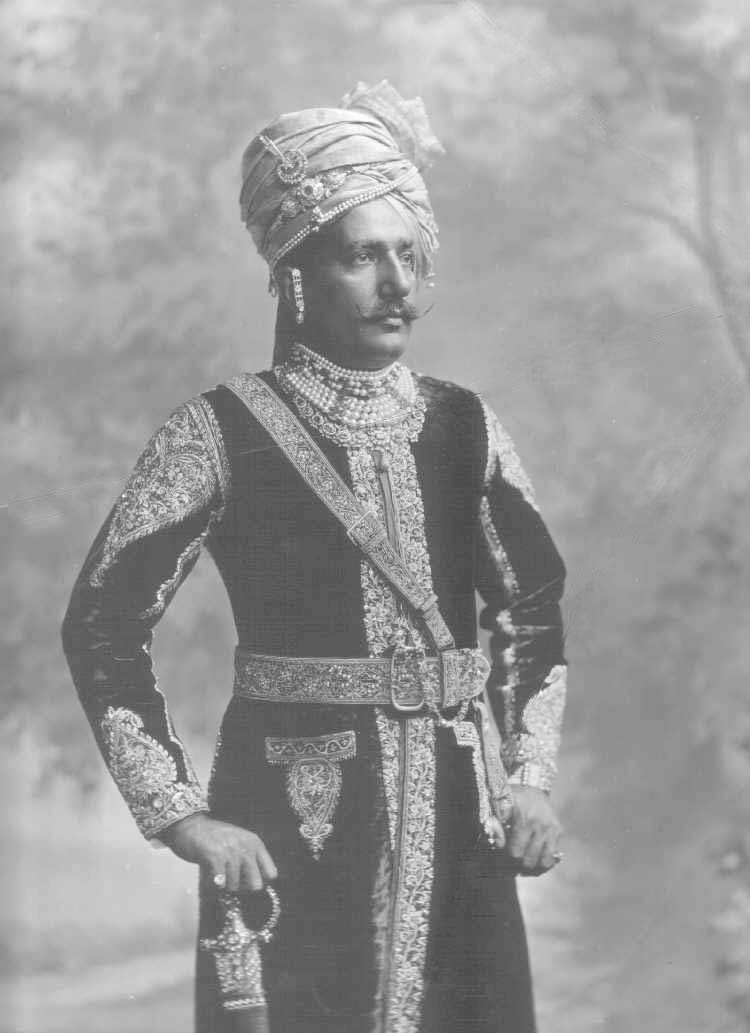
In 1897 Ajit Singh went to England to attend Queen Victoria's diamond jubilee celebration. This image of Ajit Singh was taken on 18 June 1897 at The Lafayette Studio, 179 New Bond Street, London, W.

Ajit Singh was adopted by Raja Fateh Singh, seventh king of Khetri estate. In 1870, after the death of Fateh Singh, Ajit Singh acceded to the throne and became the eighth king of Khetri. Though Khetri was small in size, the state was one of the most advanced and progressed states of Rajasthan of that time. Ajit Singh was a big admirer of arts and music. In 1897 he went to England to attend Queen Victoria's diamond jubilee.

=== Marriage and personal life ===
In 1876 Ajit Singh married Rani Champawatiji Sahiba, daughter of Thakur Devi Singh of Auwa. Rani Champawatiji Sahiba died on 16 May 1904. Ajit Singh and Champawatiji Sahiba had two daughters and one son.

- Their first daughter, Surya Kumari, was born on 16 September 1882, married Rajadhiraja Sahib Umaid Singhji II Bahadur of Shahpura in 1894. Surya Kumari died on 8 August 1913 at Shahpura.
- Their second daughter, Chandra Kumari, was born on 17 January 1889. She married Maan Singh of Pratapgarh in 1903.
- Their only son, Jai Singh Sahib, was born in Agra on 26 January 1893. He studied at Mayo College, Ajmer. In 1901, after the death of Ajit Singh, Jai became the ninth king of Khetri. In 1905, he established Ajit Singh Hospital in memory of his father. He died on 30 March 1910 in Jaipur after suffering from tuberculosis.

=== Death ===
Ajit Singh died on 18 January 1901 due to injuries he sustained from the collapsing of a tower, on which he was standing, at the tomb complex of Mughal emperor Akbar in Agra and was cremated at Mathura. At the time of death he was 39 years 3 months old. Incidentally, Swami Vivekananda too died at the age of 39.

In a letter written to Marhy Hale, on 18 May 1901, Vivekananda informed—

The Raja of Khetri died from a fall a few months ago. So you see things are all gloomy with me just now, and my own health is wretched. Yet I am sure to bob up soon and am waiting for the next turn.

In a separate letter written to Mrs. Ole Bull on 26 January 1901, Swami Vivekananda wrote:

I went to see Mrs. Sevier at Mayavati. On my way I learnt of the sudden death of the Raja of Khetri. It appears he was restoring some old architectural monument at Agra, at his own expense, and was up some tower on inspection. Part of the tower came down, and he was instantly killed.

== Relationship with Swami Vivekananda ==
I have not the least shame in opening my mind to you, and that I consider you as my only friend in this life.

— Swami Vivekananda in a letter
written on 22 November 1898.

Since the first meeting in June 1891 until Ajit Singh's death in January 1901, Ajit Singh remained a very close friend and disciple of Vivekananda. On 22 November 1898 Vivekananda sent a letter to Ajit Singh in which he described Ajit Singh as his only friend in life.

=== First meeting with Swami Vivekananda (1891) ===
After the death of Ramakrishna, in January 1887 Vivekananda (then Narendranath Datta) and eight other disciples of Ramakrishna took their formal monastic vow at Baranagar math. In 1888, Vivekananda left the monastery of Baranagar and started his life as a wandering monk. In June 1891 Vivekananda reached Khetri and there on 4 June 1891 he met Ajit Singh for the first time.

Ajit Singh's first meeting with Vivekananda has been described in detail in some later books. According to Mani Shankar Mukherjee's The Monk As Man: The Unknown Life of Swami Vivekananda, on 4 June 1891, Ajit Singh woke up at 6:30 am. That evening he met Pratap Singh, king of Jodhpur and spent around half an hour with him. After that, he was informed that a monk has come to see him. Ajit Singh met the monk. Ajit Singh found that the monk was proficient in English, Bengali and Sanskrit languages. Ajit Singh and the monk discussed on a wide range of subjects. Then Ajit Singh asked the monk to dine with him. After dinner, around 11 pm at the night, the monk left the palace of Ajit Singh. The monk was Swami Vivekananda and this was the first meeting of Ajit Singh and Vivekananda.

On his first visit to Khetri Vivekananda stayed there from 4 June 1891 to 27 October 1891. During his time as a wandering monk, this was Vivekananda's longest stay at a single place. To protect him from hot wind of Rajasthan, Ajit Singh suggested that Vivekananda wear a turban and showed him how to wear it in the Rajasthani style. Vivekananda learned the technique very quickly and later invented a few other variations of wearing it. Later in his life, the turban became a part of his common dress. During his stay Vivekananda closely observed the culture and lifestyle of Rajputana and later praised it in his lectures and letters.

=== Second meeting with Swami Vivekananda (1893) ===
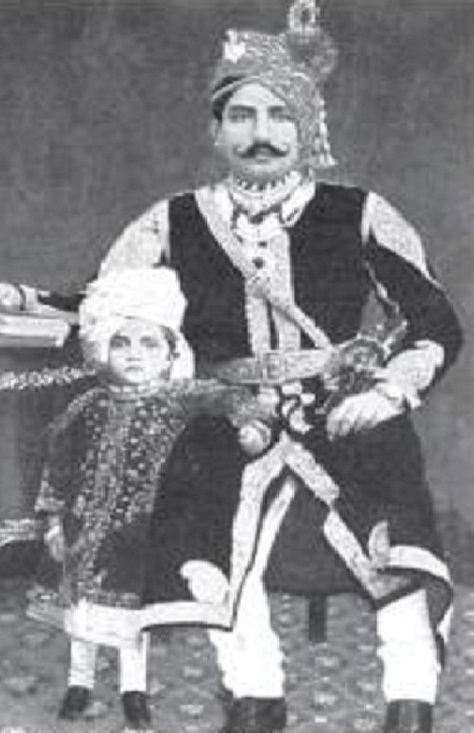
Ajit Singh of Khetri with his young son Jai Singh. After the death of Ajit Singh in 1901, Jai Singh became the ninth king of Khetri.

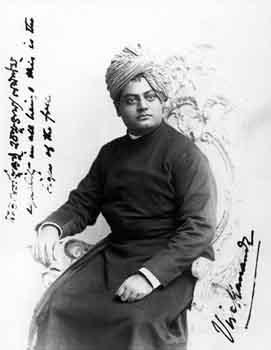
Swami Vivekananda September 1893 Chicago. Ajit Singh financed Vivekananda's tour to the West.

Swami Vivekananda visited Khetri twice more in his lifetime— in April 1893 and in December 1897. In 1893, Vivekananda stayed in Khetri for three weeks— from 21 April to 10 May.

An incident that happened during his second visit, which was later widely analysed, relates to Ajit Singh organizing a function where a courtesan was to sing. Ajit Singh invited Vivekananda to attend the performance, but Vivekananda refused the request, explaining that he was a monk and thus could not attend such performances. The dancing girl heard about this comment and at the function she sang a famous song by Sur—

O Lord, look not upon my evil qualities!
Thy name, O Lord, is Same-Sightedness.
Make us both the same Brahman!

The incident was an eye-opener for Vivekananda, and he realized that everything is but the manifestation of God.

On 9 May, one day before leaving for Bombay, Vivekananda was asked to visit the women's section of the palace where he blessed Jai Singh, the newborn son of Ajit Singh.

==== Assistance and encouragement to join Parliament of World's religions ====
Vivekananda wished to sail to America to attend the Parliament of the World's Religions as a speaker, which was to be held in Chicago in 1893. When Ajit Singh learned about this, he encouraged Vivekananda to join the Parliament as a representative of Hinduism and India and provided him financial aid and the tickets for his voyage. It was on Ajit Singh's request that Swamiji assumed his monastic name Vivekananda in preference to Sachidananda.

In a letter written to Haridas Viharidas Desai in May 1893, Vivekananda wrote—

You may remember that I had from before a desire to go to Chicago. When at Madras, the people there, of their own accord, in conjunction with H.H. of Mysore and Ramnad made every arrangement to send me up. And you may also remember that between H.H. of Khetri and myself there are the closest ties of love. Well, I, as a matter of course, wrote to him that I was going to America. Now the Raja of Khetri thought in his love that I was bound to see him once before I departed, especially as the Lord has given him an heir to the throne and great rejoicings were going on here; and to make sure of my coming he sent his Private Secretary all the way to Madras to fetch me, and of course I was bound to come.

On 10 May 1893, Vivekananda left Khetri for Bombay. Ajit Singh escorted him until Jaipur and Munshi Jagmohahlal, an employee of Khetri, escorted him up to Bombay. Ajit Singh arranged to send more money to Vivekananda after his arrival at Boston, as American dollars. In America Vivekananda lost his money and when Ajit Singh learnt of it, he immediately sent US$ 150 more through telegraph service.

Initially, Vivekananda had a lower-class ticket for his voyage, but Ajit Singh had it exchanged for a first class ticket. He also gave him a substantial amount of money for meeting his personal expenses during the journey.

Vivekananda wrote a stream of letters to Ajit Singh from the West, and later from India. Ajit Singh is known for the financial support he provided to Vivekananda for his social service. On 17 December 1897 at a meeting in Khetri Swamiji noted that whatever little he had done for the uplift of India would not have been possible had he not met the Raja of Khetri. Again, he wrote in a letter to Munshi Jagmohanlal on 11 October 1897, "Certain men are born in certain periods to perform certain actions in combination. Ajit Singh and myself are two such souls—born to help each other in a big work for the good of mankind.… We are as supplement and complement."

=== Third meeting with Swami Vivekananda (1897) ===
In 1897 Ajit Singh sent Vivekananda several letters and invited him to visit Khetri again which Vivekananda accepted. At that time he was staying in Dehradun from where he proceeded to Khetri via Delhi, Alwar and Jaipur. When Ajit Singh got the news of Vivekananda's arrival, he traveled 12 miles (19 km) from his palace to welcome him. There, Vivekananda was formally welcomed and taken in a procession to Khetri. At Khetri, all employees of the palace showed their respect to Vivekananda by touching his feet and giving him a two rupee coin each. Ajit Singh gave Vivekananda 3000 coins as a token of respect and love.

On 17 December 1897 Vivekananda publicly expressed his gratitude to Ajit Singh. He said that "it would not have been possible for me to do what little I have done for India but my friendship with Khetri's Maharaja." On 20 December 1897, Vivekananda delivered a lecture in Khetri which was attended by Ajit Singh and several Europeans.

== Assistance to Vivekananda's family ==
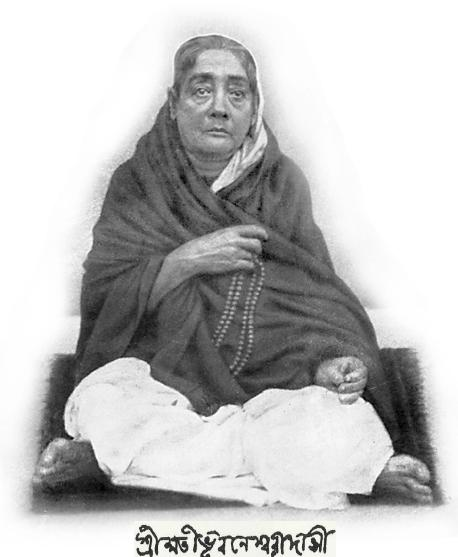
From 1891 Ajit Singh started sending a monthly stipend of ₹ 100 to Vivekananda'a family. On 1 December 1898 Vivekananda wrote to Ajit Singh from Belur requesting him to make the donation permanent so that even after Vivekananda's death his mother Bhuvaneswari Devi would get the financial assistance on a regular basis.

From 1891 Ajit Singh started sending a monthly stipend of ₹ 100 to Vivekananda's family in Kolkata. On 1 December 1898 Vivekananda wrote to Ajit Singh from Belur requesting him to make the donation permanent so that even after Vivekananda's death his mother would continue to get the financial assistance on a regular basis. In that letter Vivekananda wrote—

One thing more will I beg of you – if possible, the 100 Rs. a month for my mother be made permanent, so that even after my death it may regularly reach her. Or even if your Highness ever gets reasons to stop your love and kindness for me, my poor old mother may be provided [for], remembering the love you once had for a poor Sâdhu.

Ajit Singh continued to send the monthly allowance until his death on 18 January 1901. Historians and researchers have estimated the current value of 100 Indian rupees as something between ₹10,000 (US$110) to ₹20,000 (US$210). Mani Shankar Mukherjee in his book The Monk As Man: The Unknown Life of Swami Vivekananda commented— "It is, indeed remarkable that a disciple should be so generous towards his teacher's family". Ajit Singh did not want to publicize this assistance and thoroughly wanted to keep it a secret.

Mahendranath Datta, Swami Vivekananda's brother, wrote in his book—

Khetri's Maharaj used to send 100 rupees to Swamiji's mother on a regular basis. The money was sent every month via Sharat Maharaj, Yogen Maharaj and Mr Sandel. He specially requested that this arrangement be not discussed with others.

The letters stored at Khetri's archive show that Ajit Singh frequently communicated with members of Vivekananda's family from 1892 onwards. On 28 February 1893, Mahendranath Datta, the younger brother of Vivekananda, sent a letter to Khetri in which he expressed his anxiety on not receiving any letter from Ajit Singh for a long time. In his next letter dated 22 March 1893 Mahendranath told Ajit Singh the names of the books he recently read. He also informed him that Bhupendranath Datta (the youngest brother of Vivekananda and Mahendranath) was admitted in Metropolitan School, Kolkata, one of the most reputed schools of the city. This shows the frequency of communication between Ajit Singh and the family members of Vivekananda.

== Founding of the Ramakrishna Mission at Khetri ==
In 1958 the Ramakrishna Mission was started at the Palace of Khetri which was donated by Ajit Singh's grandson, Bahadur Sardar Singh. The building has been renamed as Vivekananda Smriti Mandir and houses marble statues of Ajit Singh and Swami Vivekananda. The room at the topmost storey where Swamiji used to stay and have spiritual discourses with Ajit Singh, has been converted into a prayer room.
