= Parasrampura =

Parasrampura Parsurampura
- town
- Country: India
- State: Rajasthan

Languages
  - Official: Hindi
- Time zone: UTC+5:30 (IST)

Parasrampura is a town in Jhunjhunu district of Rajasthan in India. It is located 43 km south east of Mandawa and has the distinction of having the best-preserved and oldest fresco paintings in the Shekhawati region. A magnificent cenotaph (Chhatri) was erected in Maharao Shardul Singh's (Ruler of Jhunjhunu) memory at Parasrampura by his heirs. Parasrampura was conquered by Maharao Shardul Singh before invading Jhunjhunu. After that Thakur Bhawani Singh (Grand son of Rawal Nawal Singh ji of Nawalgarh and great-grandson of Maharao Shardul Singh set their Thikana as Parasrampura.
