= Nangli Saledi Singh =

Indian village

Nangli Saledi Singh is a village in Shekhawati, Neem Ka Thana in Rajasthan. It is primarily an agricultural village, and serves as a commerce and market for the surrounding hamlets.
