= Mandela, Rajasthan =

Town in Jhunjhunu, Rajasthan, India

Coordinates: 28°19′N 75°26′E

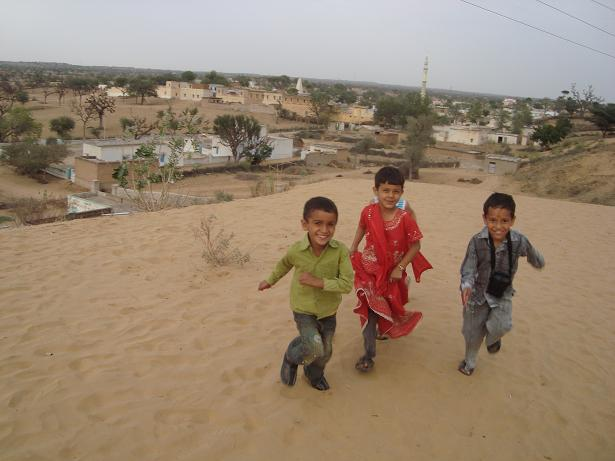
View of the village from a sand dune.

Mandela is a town in the Jhunjhunu district of the Shekhawati region of Rajasthan state in India.

== History ==
Mandrella was established in 1751, as one of the Thikanas of the Panchpana confederation of Jhunjhunu thikana by Raj-Shri Thakur Sahab Doulat Singh ji, third son of Rao Zorawar Singh ji, the ruler of Jhunjhunu state.

== Location ==
It is on the Jhunjhunu-Rajgarh road 25 km (16 mi) from Jhunjhunu. The coordinates are 27°56'42"N and 74°55'31"E.

== Demographics ==
The population of the village is around 30,000.
