= Ladusar =

Village in Rajasthan, India

Ladusar लादूसर
- Village
- Location in Rajasthan
- Coordinates: 28°13′47″N 75°17′58″E
- Country: India
- State: Rajasthan
- Tahsil: Malsisar
- District: Jhunjhunu district
- Police Station: Dhanuri
- Founder: Ladu

Government
  - Type: PRI
  - Body: Gram panchayat
  - Sarpanch: Balveer (Congress)
- PIN: 333011
- Telephone code: +911595,
- Nearest city: Jhunjhunu

Ladusar village is located in Alsisar Taluka and Malsisar Tehsil of Jhunjhunu district in Rajasthan, India. It is located in Alsisar Taluka and Malsisar Tehsil of Jhunjhunu district in Rajasthan, India. It is situated 18 km from Jhunjhunu town. The total area of the village is 924 hectares.

== Panchayat ==
Ladusar is a Gram Panchayat.

== Population ==
The population of Ladusar (as of 2011) is 2659, female population is 1324 and male population is 1335. In this village, Scheduled Tribe population is 13 and Scheduled Caste population is 212. The population of children (0–6 years) is 418, of which the population of girls (0–6 years) is 191 and the population of boys is 227.

== Education ==
Government primary school, Ladusar, was established in 1956. In 1965, it was upgraded to upper primary. In 1981, it was upgraded to a secondary school. In 2007, it was upgraded from secondary to higher secondary.
