= Kant Alsisar =

Kant (Alsisar)
- village
- Location in Rajasthan, India Kant (Alsisar) (India)
- Coordinates: 28°16′12″N 75°16′44″E
- Country: India
- State: Rajasthan
- Region: Alsisar
- Division: Malsisar Tehsil
- District: Jhunjhunu
- Established: About 1947
- Founder: Jhuhar Ram Sihag(Jat)
- Named for: Kant (Sihago ka bas)
- MP, MLA: Mandawa legislature, Jhunjhunu

Government
  - Type: PRI
  - Body: Jury
  - Sarpanch: Suresh Kumar Sihag (BJP)
  - MLA: Narendra Khichar
  - MP: Smt. Santosh Ahlawat (BJP)

Area 00672100
  - Total: 21 km^{2} (8.1 sq mi)

Population
  - Total: 4,297
  - Density: 200/km^{2} (530/sq mi)

Languages
  - Official: Hindi
- Time zone: UTC+5:30 (IST)
- PIN: 331025
- Telephone code: +911595, 00672100
- Vehicle registration: RJ18
- Nearest city: Jhunjhunu
- Literacy: 85.97%
- Avg. annual temperature: 30 °C (86 °F)
- Avg. summer temperature: 40 °C (104 °F)
- Avg. winter temperature: 10 °C (50 °F)

Kant is a small village in the Alsisar mandal of Jhunjhunu district in Rajasthan, India. It is located 24 kilometres (15 mi) away from Jhunjhunu on the North side, and 6 kilometres (3.7 mi) away from Alsisar.

== Description ==
Its area is 741.3 acres (300.0 ha). As of 2010 its population was about 3000. Its boundary stretches 8 kilometres (5.0 mi). Common dishes include green vegetables, mirchi chatani and roti chapati of wheat . The language is Marvari. Rote bazra is the most notable crop. They plant bazra in month June and harvest in October. Farmers who have a well field plant a second crop of mustard, wheat, Radish, gram, palk, gundli onion and other vegetables. Average income of villagers is about 30,000py, mostly from agriculture . Cast practiced include Gour, Sihag, Muslim, Munyan, Jenan, Kaji, Jat, Nain, Rahar, Yadav, Harijan, Nayak, Kumhar, Brahmin etc. There are 6 aldermanries. There are two religions Hindu and Muslims. There temple as Hanumanji ka mandir, Medi, Mosque, Peerji, Sumer bhaya ka mandir, Gusai ji ka mandir, Birahman mandir, Tiku bai ka dham. There some dhanies as gopalka ki dhani, Rahra ki dani, Naina ki dhani jeetu kha ki dhani

Kant is a Gram Panchayat. In this panchayat there are four small villages named as

Aanandpura area code 0067200,

Kant area code 00672100,

Bhagwatpura area code 00672000,

Bidasar area code 00671900,

Bhutiya Bas area code 00671800,

There is a Panchayat Bhawan and library.

The village hosts shops, a library, hospital, a playground, park, agla jhohra, bani, kabristan, jhohri, goga johri, pathsala and Aanganbadi.

Schools include Gour Universal Study Point (products by RS Gour), a government secondary school, Rajiv Gandhi Upper Primary School(till 2011) and Valmiki public school.
