= Rao Shekha =

Rajput ruler (1490–1545)

Maharao Shekha
- Founder of Shekhawati
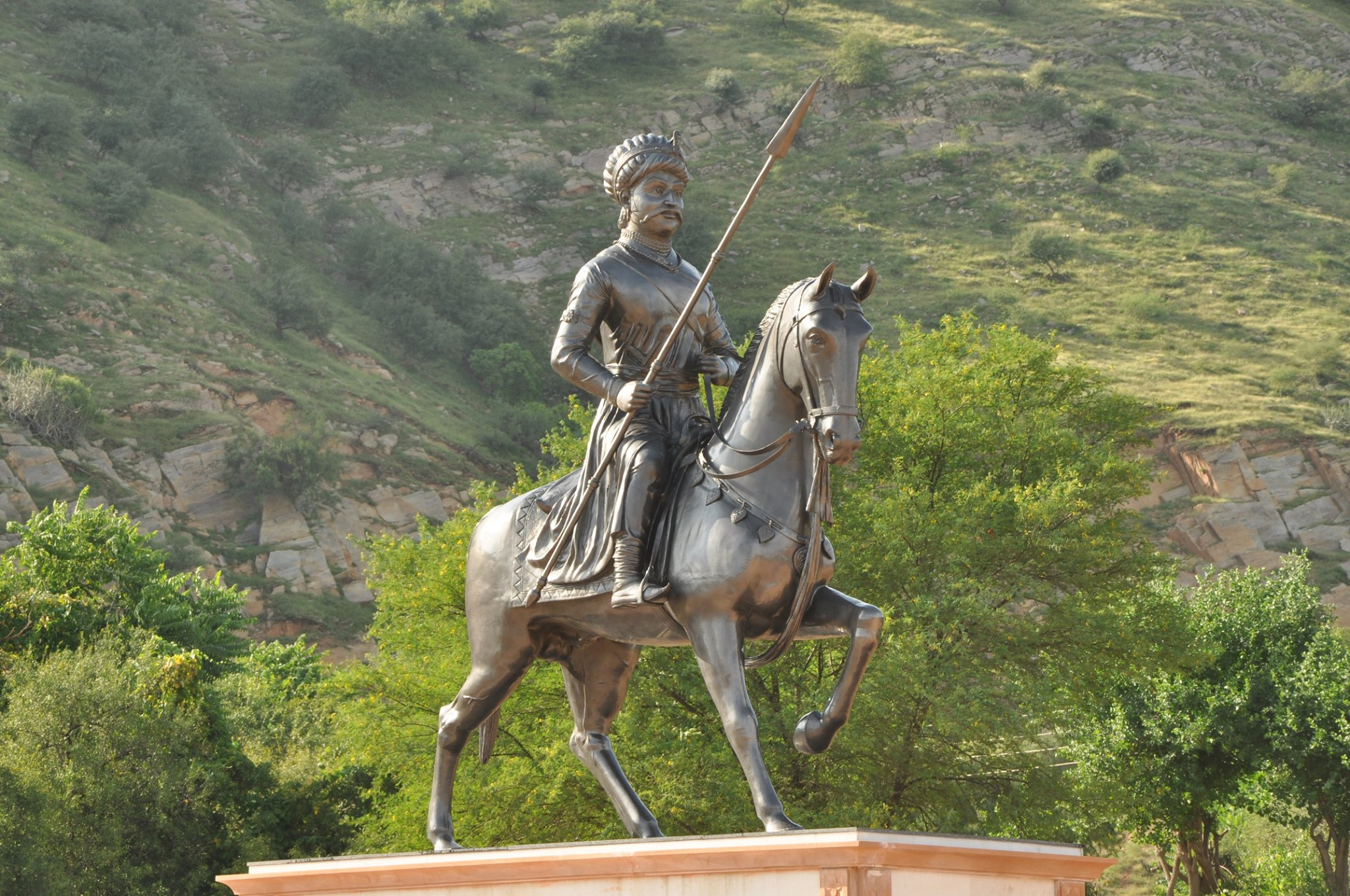
- Maharao Shekha statue in Sikar
- Reign: c. 1450 – 1488
- Coronation: c. 1450
- Predecessor: Title established
- Successor: Rao Raimal
- Born: 1433; Kingdom of Amber
- Died: 1488 (aged 54–55); Amarsar, Shekhawati
- Issue: Durga Ji Ratna Ji Trilok Ji Abhaji Achala Ji Ridmal Ji Kumbha Ji Bharmal Ji Bharat Ji Pratap Ji Pooran Ji Rao Raimal
Names
- Shekha Mokal Singh Kachhwaha
- House: Shekhawat
- Dynasty: Kachhwaha
- Father: Rao Mokal Kachhwaha
- Mother: Rani Nirwan
- Religion: Hinduism

Maharao Shekha (1433–1488) was a 15th-century Rajput chieftain and the founder of the Shekhawati region in present-day Rajasthan, India. A member of the Kachhwaha dynasty of Amber, Shekha asserted his independence and established a principality centered at Amarsar around the mid-15th century. His descendants came to be known as the Shekhawats, one of the most prominent and influential sub-clans of the Kachhwahas.

== Birth ==
Rao Balaji, third son of Maharaja Udaikaran ji of Amer, was given the estate of Nayan and Barwada after the death of his father. Descendants of Rao Balaji are collectively called "Balapota". After the death of Rao Balaji, Kunwar Mokal ji succeeded him as ruler of the estate. He had four wives, but he could not have any heir. He met a hermit who guided him to Brindavan, to pray to God, and to take care of cattle. He followed this. One day in his estate, he met a mysterious man, who was a Sufi saint named Sheikh Burhan Chisti. He gave a boon to him that his son would remain undefeated, but he had to name him after the Sufi saint and wear a tunic. On the day of Vijayadashmi, in Tyondagarh fort in Khetri, Rao Shekha ji was born from the womb of Maharani Nirwan ji, daughter of Rao Lunkaran Nirwan.

Shekhaji succeeded as the head of the Nayan and Barwada estate, along with 24 more villages, at the age of 12, as a result of the untimely death of his father Mokal ji in 1445.

== Life ==
When Shekhaji inherited his father's estate, his reputation and power attracted the jealousy of the Lord Paramount of Amber. He was attacked, but by the aid of he successfully withstood the reiterated assaults of his suzerain lord. Up to this period they had acknowledged the Amber princes as liege lords, and in token of the alliance paid as tribute all the colts reared on the original estate. A dispute on this point was the ostensible cause (though subordinate to their rapid prosperity) of intermittent separations of the Shekhawat colonies from the parent state, which lasted until the reign of Sawai Jai Singh, who brought submission and pecuniary relief from them. Shekhaji left a well-established position to his youngest son Raimal.. After Rao Raimal, Rao Lunkaran (1548-1584) was made the Head of Amarsar. After is Death, the Ancestral seat of Amarsar was succeeded by his Son Rao Manohar. Later Shahpura, became the capital of Old Amarsar - Manoharpur line of Shekhawats.

== Death ==
Shekhaji died in 1488 fighting the Gaur Rajputs in the battle of Ghatwa, reason being a newly lady of Kachwaha clan was ill treated and her husband was killed by Gaur ruler. Shekhaji took his last breath at Ralawta. A cenotaph (Chhatri) was built where he died. A statue of Shekhaji was also inaugurated in the same place by the President of India Smt. Pratibha Patil.

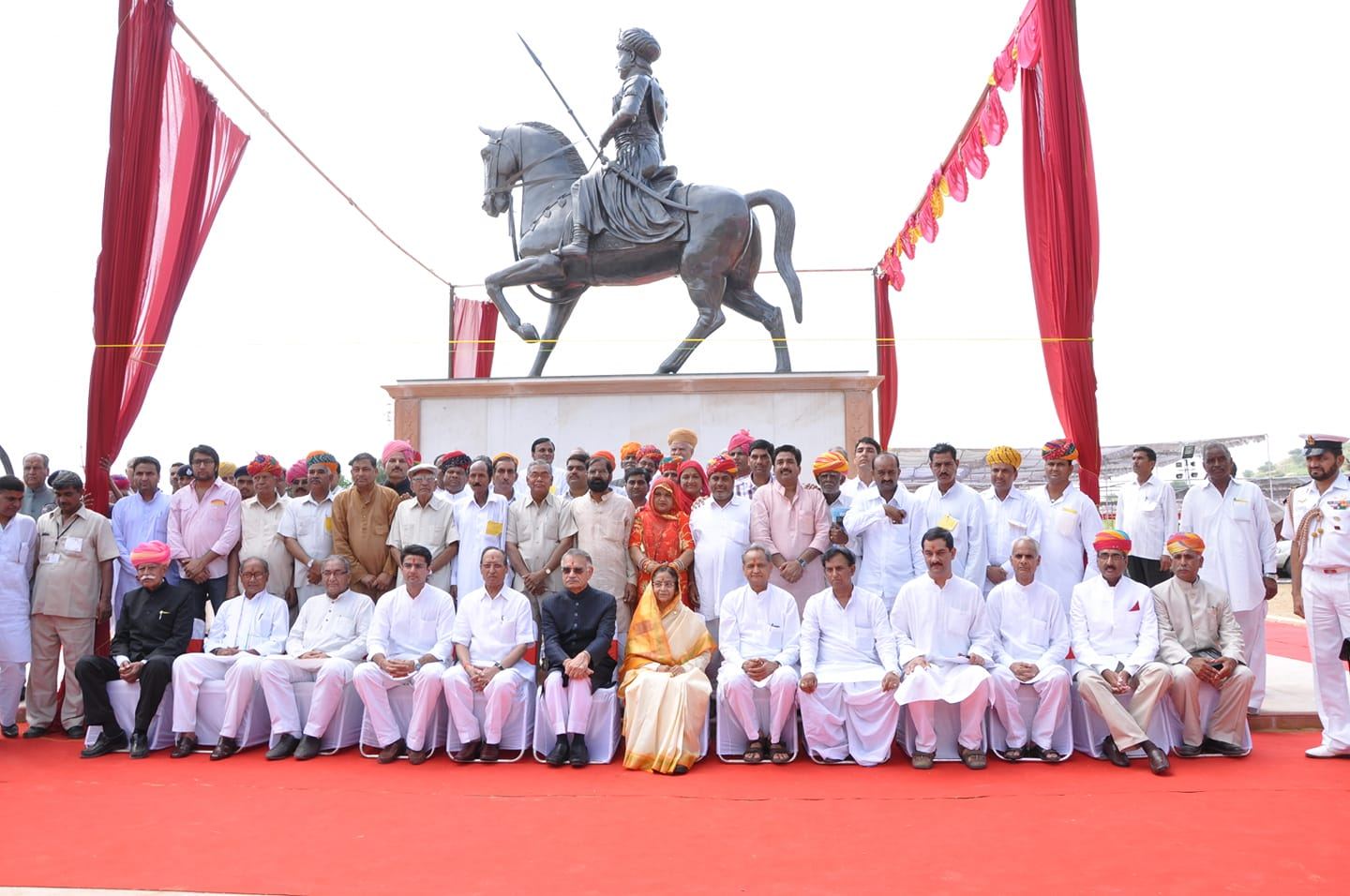
Inauguration of Maharao Shekha statue by Honorable President of India Pratibha Patil

== See also ==
- History of Rajasthan
- Rajput
- Rajputana
- James Tod
- Shahpura
