= Shahpura, Jaipur =

Shahpura
- Town
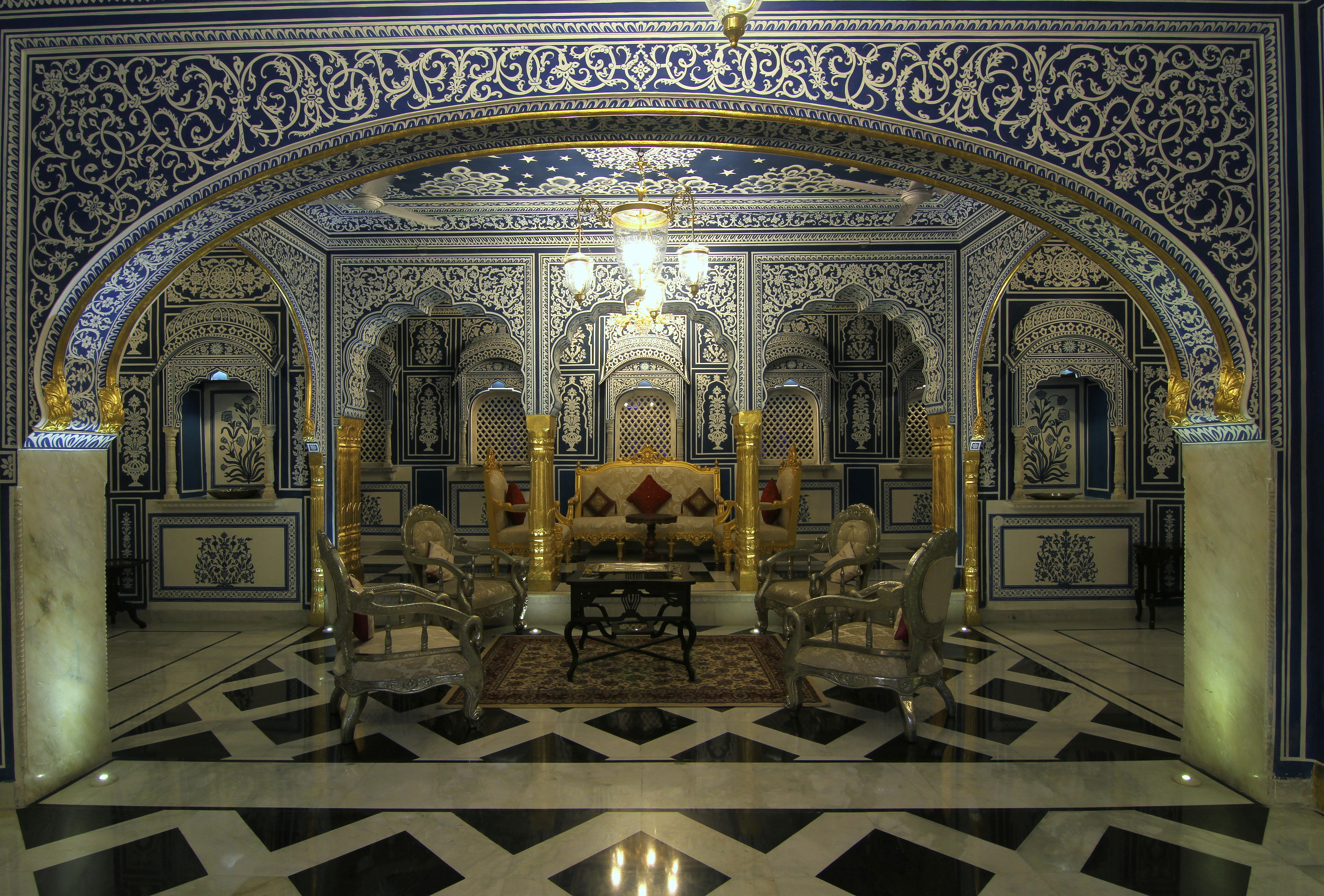
- Shahpura Haveli in Jaipur district, Rajasthan, India
- Nickname: Shahpura
- Location in Jaipur, Rajasthan, India Shahpura (India)
- Coordinates: 27.389678°N 75.959644°E
- Country: India
- State: Rajasthan
- District: Jaipur
- Elevation: 364 m (1,194 ft)

Population (2001)
  - Total: 28,170

Languages
  - Official: Hindi, Rajasthani
- Time zone: UTC+5:30 (IST)
- PIN: 303103
- Telephone code: 01422
- Vehicle registration: RJ-52

Shahpura is a town and a municipality, near the city of Jaipur in Jaipur Rural district in the Indian state of Rajasthan.

== History ==
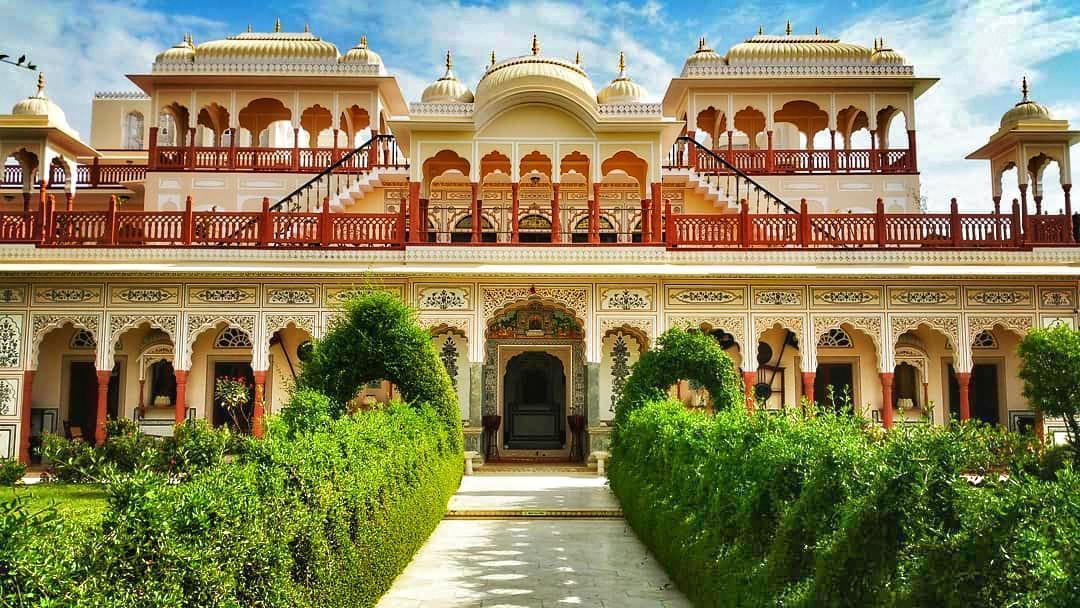
Shahpura Haveli Front Facade Picture

Shahpura is the Head seat of the Shekhawat Clan. Maharao Shekha's Son, Raimal was given Amarsar Seat, which was the Head seat of Shekhawat. After his death, Rao Suja became his successor but he had to leave Amarsar due to Sher Shah but Amarsar was soon taken back by his son Rao Lunkaran. After him, the Ancestral seat of Amarsar was succeeded by his Son Rao Manohar. Later Shahpura, became the capital of Old Amarsar - Manorharpur line of Shekhawats in Rule of Rao Bishan Singh.

== Demographics ==
As of 2001 India census, Shahpura had a population of 28,170. Males constitute 53% of the population and females 47%. Shahpura has an average literacy rate of 58%, lower than the national average of 59.5%: male literacy is 71%, and female literacy is 43%. In Shahpura, 17% of the population is under six years of age.
