= Khetri Nagar =

Khetri Mihot Copper City
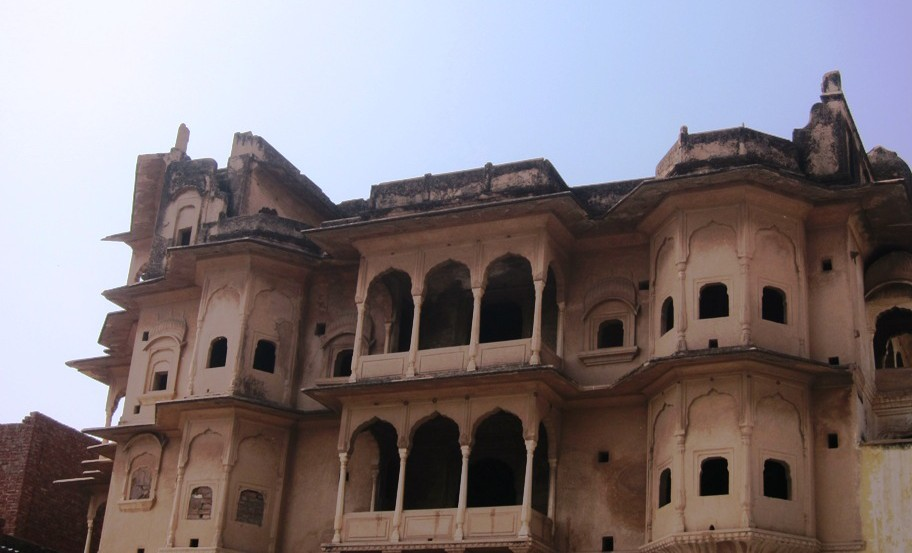
- Khetri Fort

- Location in Rajasthan, India
- Coordinates: 27.98°N 75.8°E
- Country: India
- State: Rajasthan
- District: Jhunjhunu

Government
  - Body: Khetri Municipality and Gothra Panchayat
- Elevation: 484 m (1,588 ft)

Population (2011)
  - Total: 18,209(Khetri) + 16,933(Khetri Nagar) as per 2,011 census of india

Languages
  - Official: Hindi
- Time zone: UTC+5:30 (IST)
- PIN: 333504/333503
- Telephone code: 01593
- Vehicle registration: RJ53

Khetri Nagar is a town and tehsil in the Jhunjhunu district of Rajasthan in India. It is a part of the Shekhawati region. Khetri consists of two towns, "Khetri Town," founded by Raja Bhopal Singh Ji, and "Khetri Nagar," which is about 10 km away from Khetri.

== History ==
Khetri was founded by Raja Khet Singh Ji Nirwan, Raja Bhopal Singh Ji Shekhawat ( Vikram Samvat 1745-1771) Birth Vikram samvat 1792 Son of Jhunjhunu Thakur Kishan Singh Ji Shekhawat ईस्वी 1709 - 45 v.s 1802 as a thikana of Shekhawat rajput ruler of Shekhawati. Thakur Bhopal Singh married thakur Amar Singh Ji Nirwan Jasrapur.

Thakur Amar Singh Ji had celebrated the wedding with great pomp and grandeur. Khet Singh Ji Nirvan—a kinsman of Thakur Amar Singh Nirvan—had established a settlement there; the abundance of grass near the local hills provided excellent grazing facilities for horses.Seeing that hilly place suitable for horse grazing, Bhopal Singh asked for it and after making a good shed there, he left the horses and men. Bhopal Singh liked this hilly part so much that he took it over by deceit, built a small tower on the hill in Vikram Samvat 1812 and later settled Khetri Nagar at the place of Khet Singh's hideout and built Bhopalgarh on the peak.Bhopal Singh was the Thakur of Jhunjhunu, and in Vikram Samvat 1814, he declared Khetri his capital.

Raja Ajit Singh Bahadur (16 October 1861 – 18 January 1901) was the ruler of the Shekhawat estate (thikana) of Khetri.

== Khetri fort ==
Khetri Fort was built in 1754 by the Shekhawat raja, Bhopal Singh (Raja Shri Bhopal Singh Shekhawat Ji Saheb Bahadur).

== Geography ==
Khetri is located at 27.98°N 75.8°E. It has an average elevation of 484 metres (1587 feet). The name of the mountain in Khetri is Bhopalgarh.

== Demographics ==
As of 2011 India census, Khetri had a population of 18,209. Males constitute 51.9% of the population and females 48.1%. Khetri has an average literacy rate of 70.25%, lower than the national average of 74.04%: male literacy is 79.82%, and female literacy is 59.92%. In Khetri, 12.88% of the population is under six years of age. Khetri Population Religion Data: Hindu 89.68% Muslim 10.09% Christian 0.08% Sikh 0.04% Buddhist 0.00% Jain 0.08% Others 0.01% No Religion 0.02%

== Administration ==
Khetri is a tehsil in the Jhunjhunu district of Rajasthan state in India. The total number of villages in this Tehsil is 106.

== Economy ==
Khetri Nagar is under the control of Hindustan Copper Limited, a public sector undertaking under the Government of India. There are many attached villages near Khetri Nagar, such as Manota Khurd; the people of this village were employed in mines.

== See also ==
- Dhundhar
- History of Rajasthan
