= Heerwa =

Place in Rajasthan, India

Thikana Heerwa fortress was built by Thakur Pahar Singh in 1763, Thakur Sahib died in 1771 and was succeeded by his son Inder Singh who ruled Heerwa, Sigra and Balaria. He was succeeded by his son Devi Singh, the next successor was his son Ramnath Singh.
