= Shekhawat =

Rajput clan

Shekhawat शेखावत
- Rajput clan
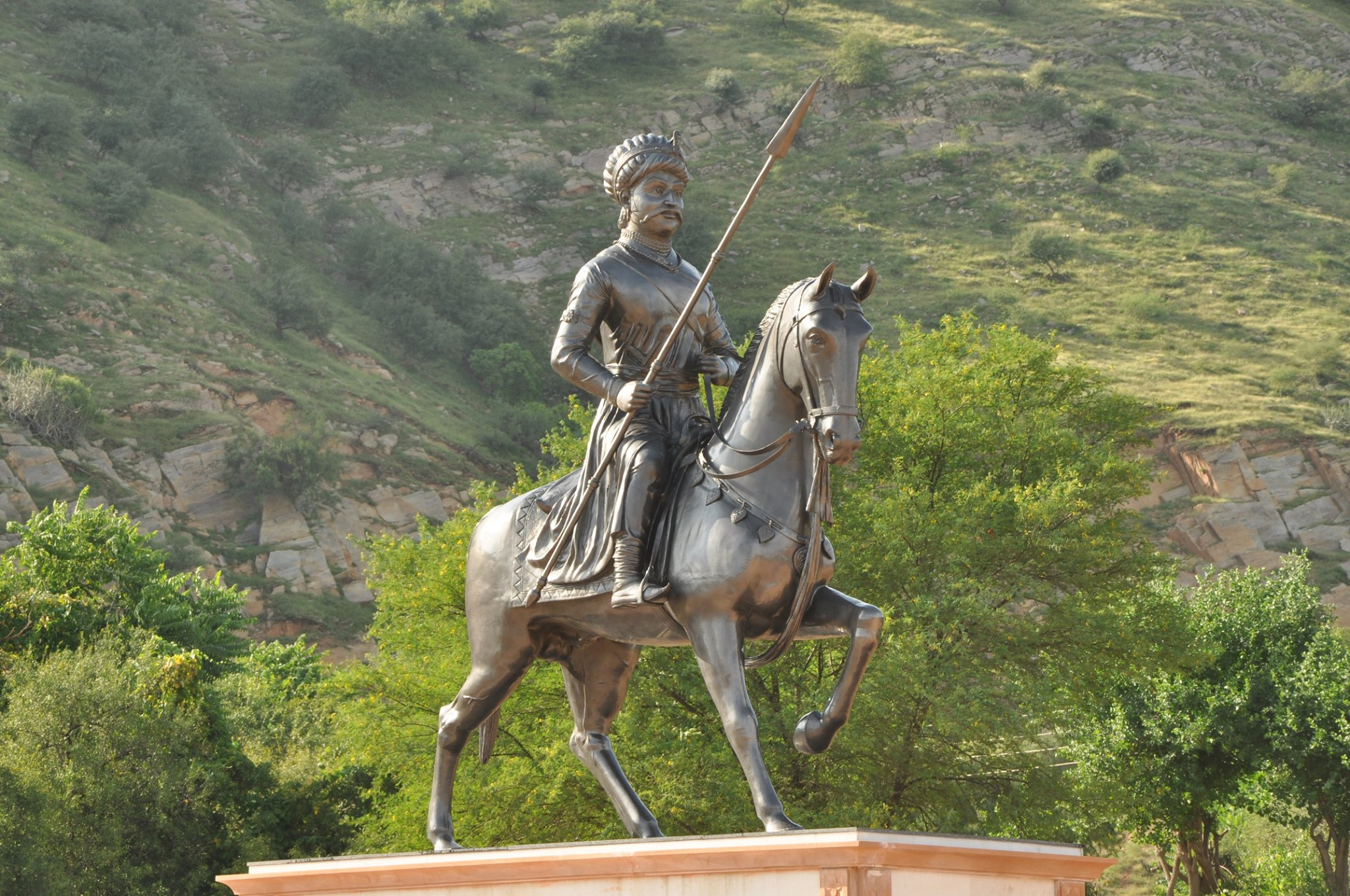
- Statue of Maharao Shekha in Sikar, the founder of the Shekhawat clan
- Parent house: Kachhwaha
- Country: Sikar; Khetri Nagar; Nawalgarh; Mandawa; Alsisar; Dundlod
- Current region: Rajasthan (Shekhawati region)
- Founded: 15th century CE
- Founder: Rao Shekha
- Titles: Rao, Thakur, Rao Raja
- Traditions: Hinduism

Shekhawat is a prominent sub-clan of the Kachhwaha Rajputs, primarily found in the Shekhawati region of Rajasthan, India. The clan traces its lineage to Maharao Shekha, a notable 15th-century Rajput ruler from whom both the clan and the region derive their name.

== History ==
The Shekhawat Rajputs trace their lineage to Rao Shekha, a 15th-century Rajput ruler, and descendant of Rao Kalyan Singh, who belonged to the Kacchawaha clan of the Kingdom of Jaipur.

Rao Shekha established his own principality in the Shekhawati region of Rajasthan, which includes parts of present-day Jhunjhunu, Sikar, and Churu districts. His leadership helped consolidate Rajput power in this region. Over time, the Shekhawat Rajputs expanded their territories and established several forts and palaces. The Shekhawat Rajputs established their dominance in the Shekhawati region in the 15th century, specifically starting around the time of Shekha Rao's rise to prominence in the early 1400s. They played a significant role in regional politics and were known for their martial prowess and resistance against Mughal expansion. Their rule continued until the mid-20th century when the princely states were integrated into the Indian Union. Thus, the Shekhawat Rajputs governed the Shekhawati region for approximately 500 years, from the early 15th century until the 1940s and 1950s, when princely states were absorbed into independent India. Shekhawat is a very common surname in the Indian defence forces.

== Branches ==
Bhojraj Ji Ka, Girdhar Ji Ka, Jagmal Ji Ka, Achaldas Ji Ka, Rao Ji Ka, Ladkhani, Bhairo ji Ka, Taknet, Ratnawat, Khejroliya, Milakpuriya, Tejsi Ka, Jagmalji Ka, Sahasmalji Ka, Lunkaranji Ka, Ugarsenji Ka, Sanwanldasji Ka, Gopalji Ka, Chandapota, Parsuramji Ka, Tajkhani, Hariramji Ka etc.

== Notable people ==
- Thakur Bhojraj, ruler of udaipurwati.
- Ajit Singh of Khetri, Maharaja of Khetri.
- Rao Shekha, the founder of Shekhawat clan. Shekhawati region is named after him.
- Bhairon Singh Shekhawat, former Vice President of India. He served as the Chief Minister of Rajasthan three times, from 1977 to 1980, 1990 to 1992 and 1993 to 1998. He was awarded Padma Bhushan in the year 2003.
- Gajendra Singh Shekhawat, Member of Parliament from Jodhpur and a senior leader of the Bharatiya Janata Party. He served as Union Minister for Jal Shakti (2019–2024). He is currently serving as Union Minister of Culture and Union Minister of Tourism in the Government of India.
- Saurabh Singh Shekhawat, KC, SC, SM, VSM – One of the most decorated officers in the Indian Army; recipient of the Kirti Chakra, Shaurya Chakra, Sena Medal (Gallantry), and Vishisht Seva Medal. A veteran of Special Forces operations and a three-time Mount Everest summiteer, he also led several high-altitude rescue missions and served as Deputy Commandant of High Altitude Warfare School.
- Vijai Singh Shekhawat, Former Chief of the Naval Staff of India.
- Major Thakur Dalpat Singh, Commander of Jodhpur Lancers of the British Indian Army, also known as the "Hero of Haifa" for his actions in the Battle of Haifa during the first World War.
- Piru Singh was awarded the Param Vir Chakra (PVC), India's highest military decoration 3245.
- Shardul Singh, ruler of jhunjhunu.
- Thakur Nawal Singh, ruler of Nawalgarh
