= Thakur Bhojraj =

Ruler of Udaipurwati 1621/1640, Rajasthan

Bhojraj
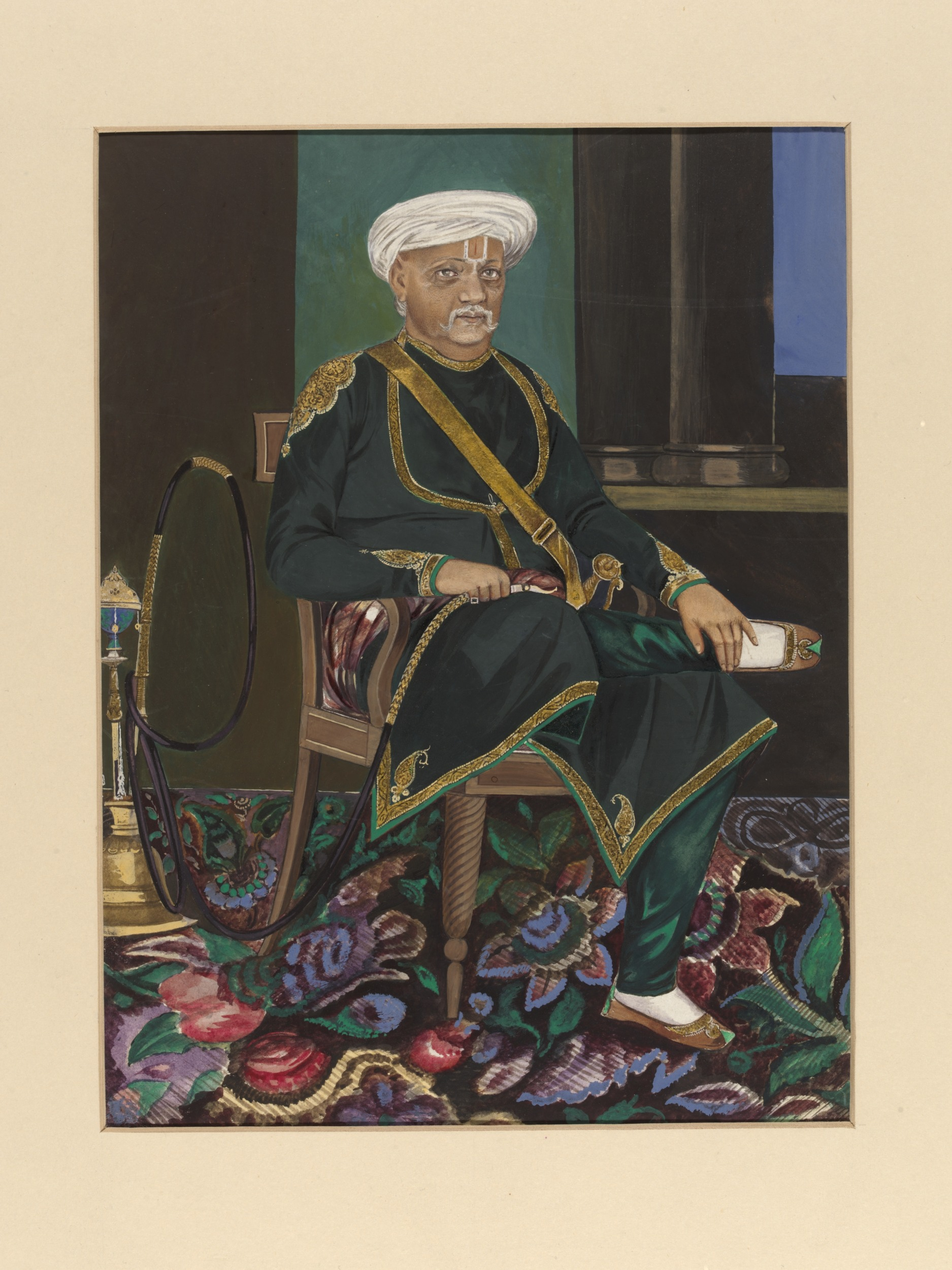
- Portrait of Thakur Bhojraj by Gopal, c. 1874
- Reign: B.S. 1678–1697 (A.D. 1621–1640)
- Successor: Raja Todermal Ji
- Born: B.S. 1697, bhadwa sudi 11, (A.D. 1640),
Names
- Bhojraj Shekhawat
- Dynasty: Shekhawat, Kachwaha
- Father: Raisal Ji, ruler of Khandela
- Mother: Hansa kanwar Ji

Rao Shri Bhojraj Singh Ji Saheb, was born in 1567 (Bhadwa Sudi 11, samwat 1624), Rao Bhojraj Ji was the ruler of Udaipurwati from 1621 to 1640. (Barau)

== Life ==
He was the son of Raja Shri Raisal Ji Saheb of Khandela and his fourth wife, Rani Hansa Kanwar Mertani Ji Sahiba of Merta (daughter of Jagmal Viramdevot of Merta). He received Kosambi region in 1608 as his jagir by his father, where he settled down in 1608 AD (samwat 1665), it was later renamed Udaipurwati, he was granted a mansab of 800 zat and 400 sawars, later raised to 1000 zat and 500 sawars. In 1582 AD (samwat 1639), he represented his father, Raja Raisal in the battle of Kangra.

In 1596, the year of famine, he started the construction of a tank, namely the "Bhoj Sagar" (in Khandela) for the relief of famine sufferers. He constructed the Fort and a famous Bhojbagh Garden.

== Personal life ==
Thakur Bhojraj had 3 sons. Todarmal who succeeded his father as the ruler of Udaipurwati Rao Bhojraj Ji died c. 1640 at Khandela. He was the ancestor of Bhojraj Ji Ka sect of Shekhawats.
