= Bissau, Rajasthan =

Bissau Vishalgarh
- City and municipality
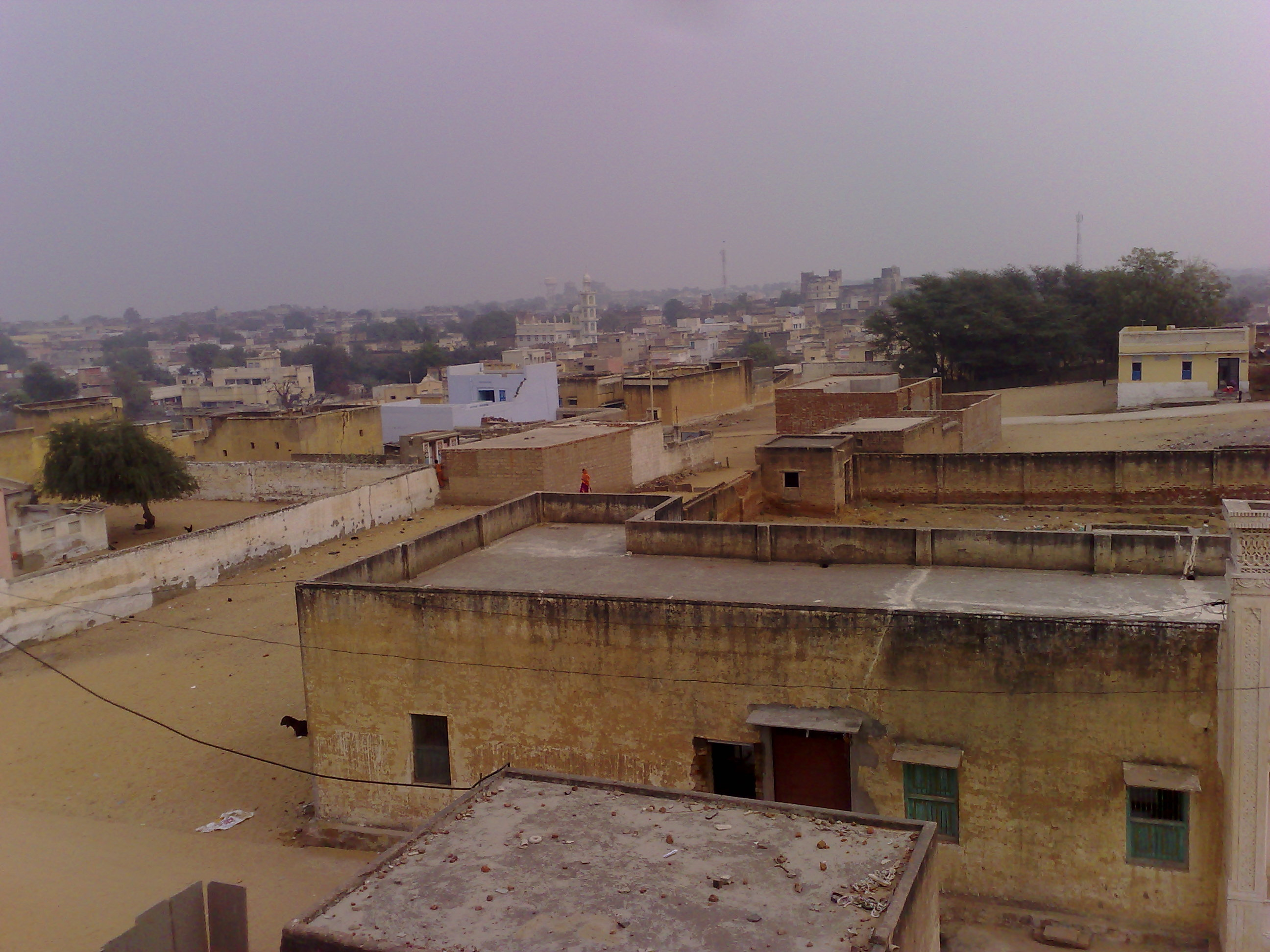
- Bissau, north-east view

- Location in Rajasthan, India Bissau (India)
- Coordinates: 28.25°N 75.08°E
- Country: India
- State: Rajasthan
- District: Jhunjhunun
- Founder: Thakur Kesari Singh of Bissau

Government
  - Type: Democratic
  - Chairman: Mustak khan (INC)
- Elevation: 292 m (958 ft)

Population (2011)
  - Total: 23,227

Languages
  - Official: Hindi
- Time zone: UTC+5:30 (IST)
- Pincode(s): 331027
- Area code: 91-01595
- Vehicle registration: RJ18

Bissau is a town and a municipality in Jhunjhunu district in the state of Rajasthan, India.

== Demographics ==
As of 2011 India census, Bissau had a population of 23,227. Males constitute 51% of the population and females 49%. Bissau has an average literacy rate of 60%, higher than the national average of 59.5%, with male literacy of 70% and female literacy of 50%. 18% of the population is under 6 years of age.
