= Shekhawati =

Region in Rajasthan, India

Shekhawati शेखावटी
- Historical region
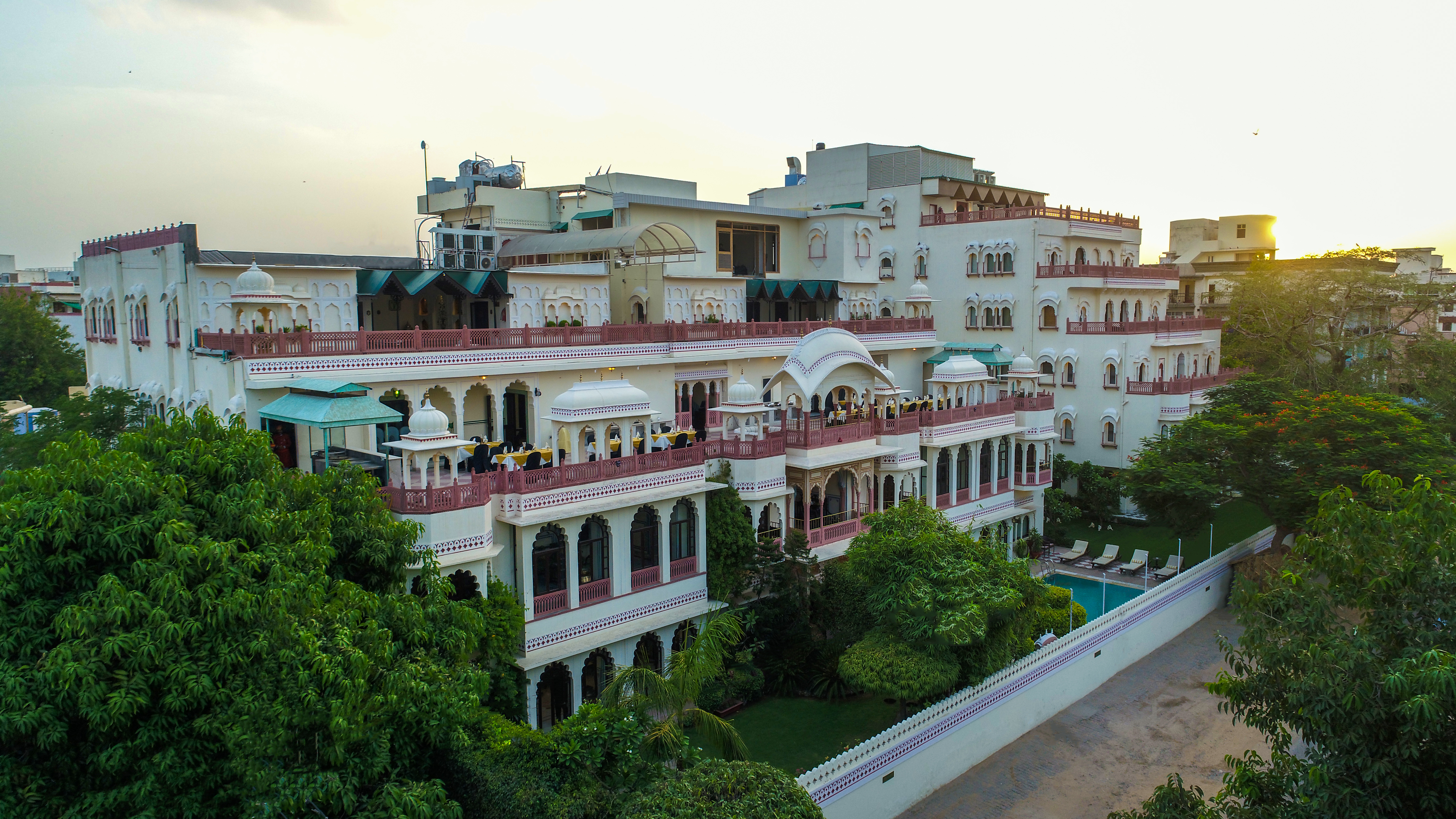
- Shahpura Haveli

- Map of the Shekhwati region in Rajasthan, India
- Continent: Asia
- Country: India
- State: Rajasthan
- Districts: Sikar, Jhunjhunu & Churu
- Founder: Rao Shekha
- Named for: Rao Shekha
- Demonym: Shekhawati
- Regional Language or dialect: Shekhawati (Rajasthani)

Shekhawati is a region in the northern part of the Indian state of Rajasthan, comprising the districts of Sikar, Jhunjhunu, and Churu. The language of this region is also called Shekhawati, which is one of the eight dialects of the Rajasthani language. Shekhawati is known for its grand mansions, their architecture and Shekhawati paintings.

Between the 17th and 19th centuries, Marwari merchants and Shekhawat kings built havelis in the Shekhawati region. It has structures, including houses, temples, and stepwells. All of these structures have painted murals, both inside and out.

== Etymology ==
Shekhawati derives its name from Maha Rao Shekha, a prominent Kachwaha Rajput chieftain who founded the region in the 15th century. The name is derived from the combination of "Shekha" (the name of the founder) and "wati," meaning "garden" or "garden of". Thus, Shekhawati literally translates to "The Garden of Rao Shekha".

Shekhawati was first mentioned in the book Bankidas ki Khyat. A contemporary of Kaviraja Bankidas Colonel W.S. Gardener, used the term "Shekhawati" in 1803. Later, James Tod wrote the first history of Shekhawati. The term "Shekhawati" is also frequently used in Vamsh Bhaskar.

== History ==
=== Ancient history ===
Almost the entire region of Shekhawati was once under the rule of the Gaur Rajput dynasty. After more than 15 wars with Gaur rajput dynasty gaur dynasty rulers lost their large part of kingdom into Shekhawati. Many historians believe this region was part of the Matsya kingdom. Rigveda also provides certain evidence in this matter. Manusmriti has called this land 'Brahmrishi Desha'.

The Shekhawati region was included in 'Marukantar Desha' up to the Ramayana period. Out of 16 mahajanapadas prior to Buddha, only two Janapadas (namely Avanti and the Kingdom of Virata) were counted in the Rajasthan area. This region was also influenced by Avanti, however Nandas of Magadha later defeated Avanti. Historians believe that Mauryas obtained the Rajasthan from Nandas.

In ancient times, Shekhawati was not limited to the present two districts. During the Mahabharata period, the region was known as the Matsya kingdom and extended up to the Sarasvati River. Matsya Kingdom was founded by King Matsya (named Matsya because he was born from an apsra living as a fish), son of King Uparichara Vasu. During ancient times, this region was divided into several janapadas. Dhosi Hill, the revered hill bordering Haryana and famous for Chyavana Rishi's Ashram, as well as the place where Chyawanprash was formulated for the first time, has extensive mentions in the epic Mahabharat in Vanparv.

After the collapse of the Gupta dynasty, the Shekhawati was controlled by the Chauhan Rajputs. Some parts of Shekhawati, Jhunjhunu, Fatehpur, and Narhar were taken from them by Kaimkhanis, which in turn were defeated by Shekhawat Rajputs.

Kaimkhani is a branch emerging from the Chauhans. The first progenitor of Kaimkhanis was Karamchand, born in the family of Moterao of the Chauhan clan, ruler of Dadrewa. Firuz Shah Tughluq converted him to Islam and named him Kaimkhan. Thus, his descendants are called Kaimkhani.

=== Shekhawat rule ===
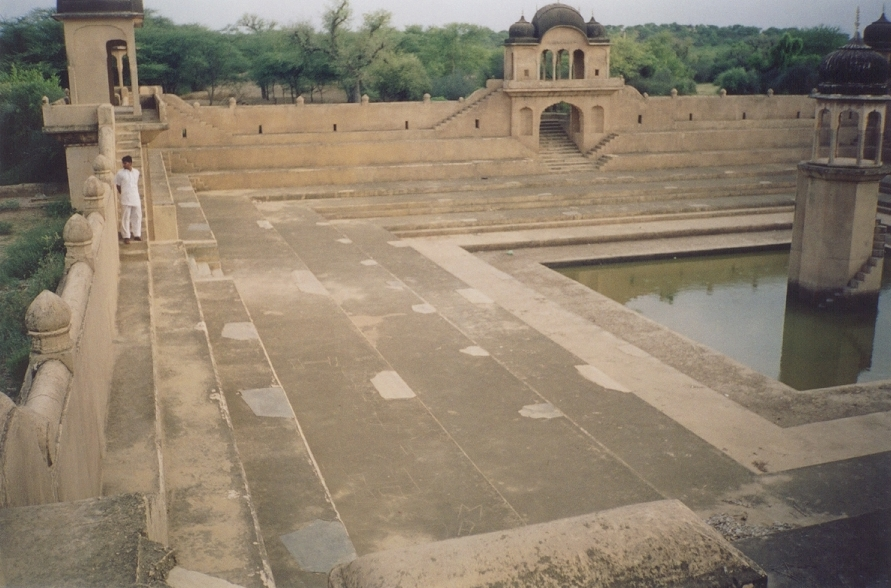
Bawdi in Fatehpur. Fatehpur wthefounded by Nawab Fateh Khan in 1449

Shekhawati was established and ruled by Shekhawat Rajputs until India's independence.

Rao Shekha from Dhundhar established his own independent kingdom with the capital located in Amarsar. He was the first independent ruler. After him, Rao Raimal, Rao Suja, and Rao Lunkaran become the rulers of Amarsar. Rao Manohar succeeded his father, Rao Lunkaran, and founded Manoharpur (later renamed Shahpura). The present ruler of Shahpura is the Tikai of the Shekhawat subclan. The Shekhawats conquered the Jhunjhunu, Fatehpur, and Narhar of the Kaimkhanis, established their rule in 1445, and continued to rule until 1614.

==== Thikanas of Shekhawati ====
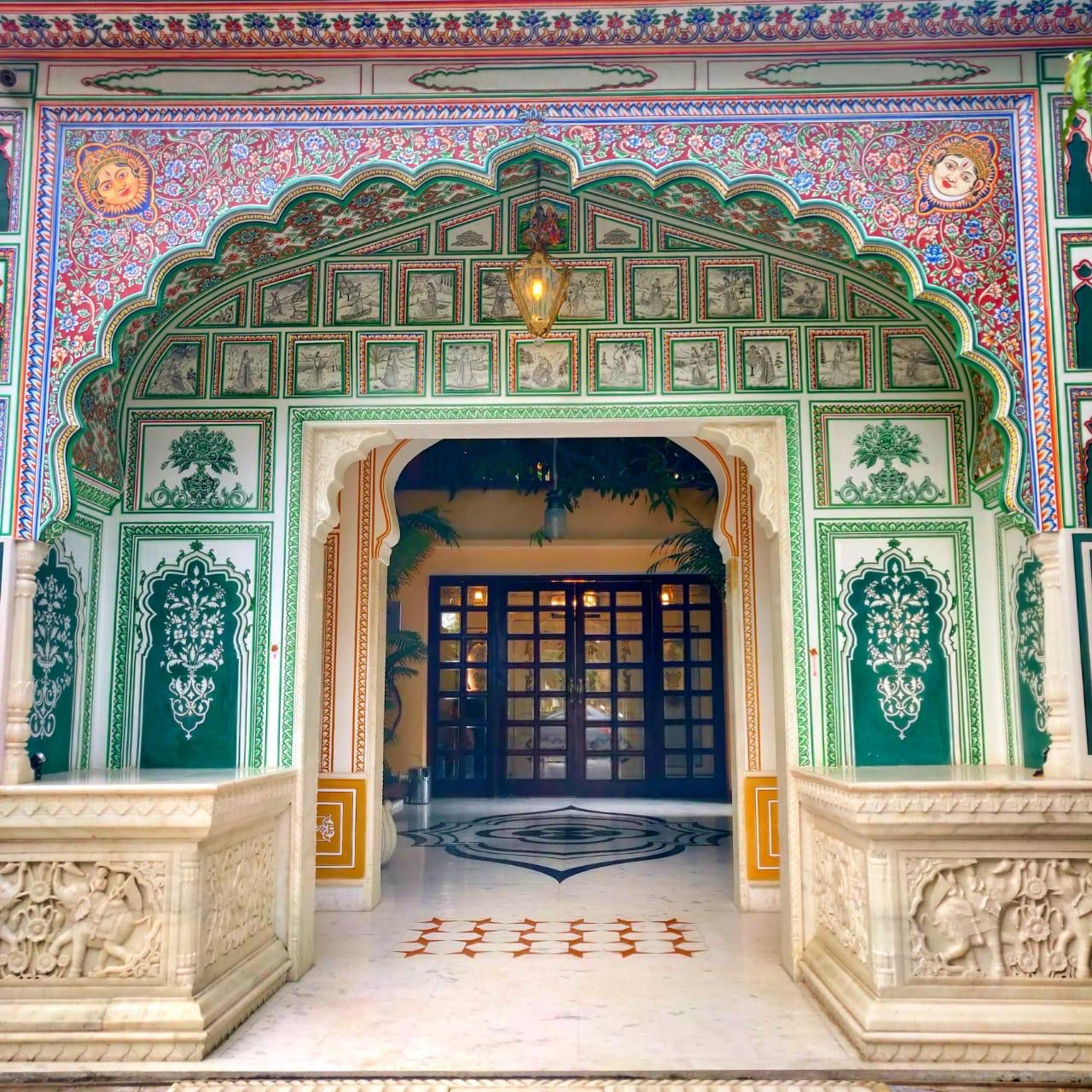
Gate of Shahpura House, Shekhawati, Rajputana build by Shekhawat Ruler

Rao Shekha, a Shekhawat Rajput (sub-branch of Kachhwaha), was the founder of Shekhawati, who originally divided Shekhawati into 33 Thikana (also called a Pargana), each with at least a kutcha mud fort, some of which were later reinforced with stone. Many Thikanas had their own flags and emblems. Shekhawats ruled over the largest number of Thikanas in Jaipur Rajwara.

An alphabetical list of the original 33 Thikana is as follows:

- Baloda Thikana was granted to Raj Shree Thakur Dalel Singh Ji Shekhawat, who received a jagir consisting of 12 villages. He migrated from Pilani Fort and was the son of Raj Shree Thakur Nawal Singh Ji Shekhawat of Nawalgarh and the grandson of Jhunjhunu Raja Shree Shardul Singh Ji Shekhawat. Initially, Thakur Dalel Singh Ji Shekhawat established Pilani and constructed Dalelgarh Fort. He was granted the territories of Pilani and Baloda, along with 12 villages, as part of his jagir. In 1832, he participated in the Mandan War. Subsequently, he and his lineage migrated to Baloda Thikana, where he formally took charge of the estate. Raj Shree Thakur Dalel Singh Ji Shekhawat became the first Jagirdar (Thikanedar) of Baloda Thikana. The Shekhawat rulers of Baloda Thikana belong to the Bhojraji clan and the Shardulsinghot subclan (Panchpana).
- Barau Thikana, founded by Kunwar Kushal Singh, son of Thakur Jagram Singh.
- Bissau Thikana, Bissau and Surajgarh merged to form Bissau
- Chirawa Thikana, Chirawa and Sultana merged to form Chirawa.
- Dundlod Thikana
- Indrapura Ratnawat clan, Churu
- Jhunjhunu Thikana
- Khachariawas Thikana was granted to Raja Raisal's eldest son Lal Singh. As Akbar called Lal Singh the Lad Khan, this name became famous, and his descendants are known as Ladkhani.
- Khatu Thikana was granted to Raja Raisal's second son Kesari Singh.
- Kansarda Thikana was granted to Kanak Singh.
- Khandela Thikana
- Khatushyamji Thikana
- Khelna Thikana
- Khetri Thikana
- Loharu Thikana was the 33rd Thikana, which was granted to Arjun Singh, who constructed a kutcha mud fort there in 1570. It was later converted to a pucca fort in 1803.
- Mandawa Thikana
- Mandela Thikana
- Mukundgarh Thikana
- Mundru Thikana
- Nangali Saledi Singh Thikana was granted by Rao Bhojraj to his youngest son, Saledi Singh Shekhawat.
- Nawalgarh Thikana
- Parasrampura Thikana
- Pentalisa Thikana
- Pilani Thikana was granted Dalel Singh Shekhawat, the third son of Thakur Nawal Singh of Nawalgarh. Dalel Singh was granted Baloda and Pilani with 12 villagea. He built Dalelgarh fort in Pilani, and after some time he migrated to Baloda Thikana.
- Shahpura Thikana was the head seat of Shekhawat clan. Shahpura was a Tazimi Thikana of Shekhawat sub-clan and was granted by Rao Shekha to his youngest son Rao Lunkaran.
- Sikar Thikana was granted to Maharaja Rao Tirmal. His descendants are known as Rao Ji ka.
- Surajgarh Thikana
- Tosham Thikana
- Udaipurwati Thikana was granted by Raja Rtisal to his fifth son, Rao Bhojraj. Rao Bhojraj was the ancestor of the Bhojraj Ji Ka branch of Shekhawats. His descendants founded many Thikanas and ruled over them. The group of 45 villages of Udaipurwati was known as Pentalisa. Pentalisa included Jhajhar, Gudha, Bagholi, Khirod, etc.

== Geography ==
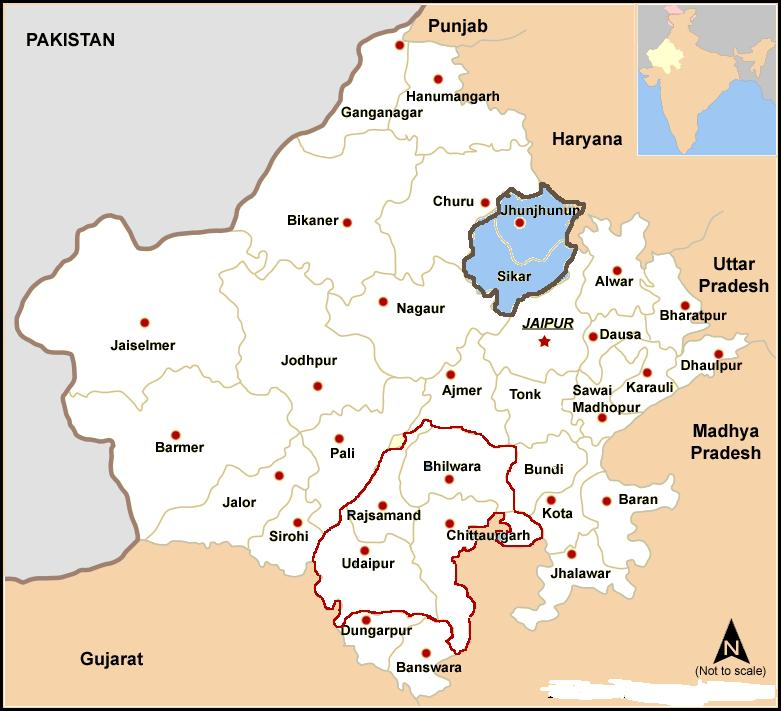
Shekhawati region of Rajasthan (in blue)

Shekhawati is in the Thar Desert of Rajasthan and has special importance in the history of India. It also covers part of the Bagar tract along the Haryana-Rajasthan border.

The climate of the desert region is harsh and extreme. The temperature ranges from below 0 °C (32 °F) in winter to more than 50 °C (122 °F) in summer. The summer brings hot waves of air called loo. Annual rainfall is at around 450 to 600 mm. The groundwater is as deep as 200 feet (60 m), and in some places, the groundwater is hard and salty. The people in the region depend on rainwater harvesting. The harvested rainwater during the monsoon season (July and August) is stored in pucca tanks and used throughout the year for drinking purposes.

=== Major cities ===
Major cities in Shekhawati include:

- Sikar district
  - Sikar
  - Fatehpur
  - Reengus
  - Laxmangarh
  - Ramgarh
  - Sri Madhopur
- Jhunjhunu district
  - Jhunjhunu
  - Chirawa
  - Nawalgarh
  - Pilani
  - Bissau
  - Khetri
  - Mandawa
  - Udaipurwati

== Culture, heritage and tourism ==
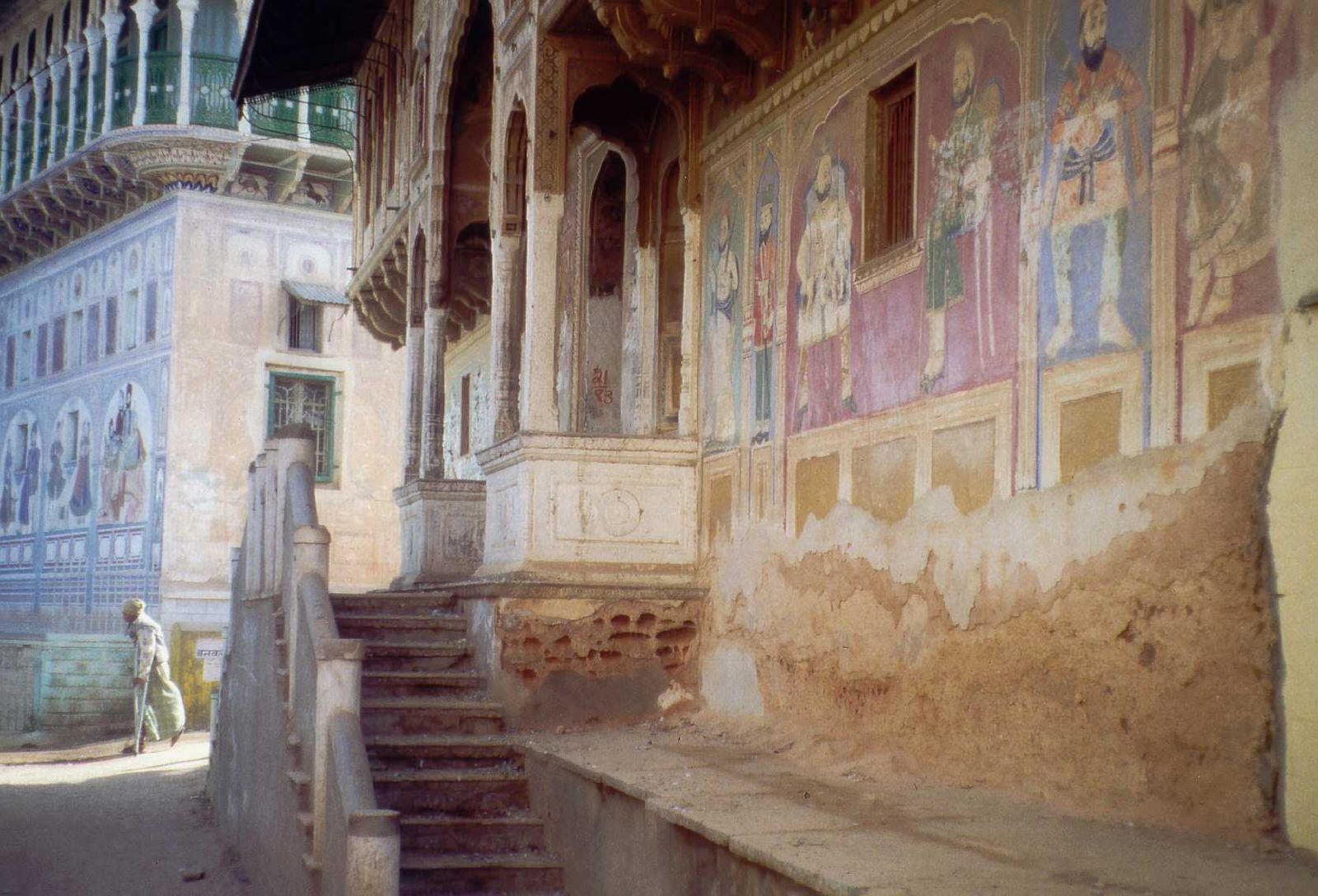
Shekhawati painted houses

=== Architecture ===
Shahpura Haveli is a 300-year-old palace built by Rao Pratap Singh, descendant of Rao Shekha, in the 17th century. In the zenana (women's quarters), various rooms offer different themes. One room has antique murals, another has a marble fountain, while the turret room has walls that are 7 feet (2.1 m) thick. Diwankhana, the formal drawing room, is decorated with family portraits and an array of antique armour. The Haveli was then renovated by Maharaj Surendra Singh and is now running as a Heritage Hotel. The haveli was recognized as one of the Historic Hotels in the World in the year 2018.

=== Havelis, temples and frescos ===
Most of the buildings of the Shekhawati region were constructed between the 18th century and the early 20th century. During the British occupation, traders adapted this style for their buildings. Shahpura Haveli in Shahpura, 65 km from Jaipur on Jaipur - Delhi Highway, and Nangal Sirohi in Mahendragarh district, 130 km from Delhi, are popular for their Shekhawati architecture within the National Capital Region (NCR).

=== Clothes ===
Women wear ghagra lugdi as their traditional dress and men wear usual Rajasthani dress.

== Shekhawati language ==
Shekhawati is a dialect of the Rajasthani language and is spoken by about three million speakers in the Jhunjhunu and Sikar districts of Rajasthan, according to Historical Census of Rajputana provide by Government of India. Even though it is an important dialect from the grammatical and literary points of view, very little work is carried out on it. In 2001 a descriptive compendium of the grammar of Shekhawati was published. Shekhawati, like the Bagri dialect of Anupgarh, Sri Ganganagar, Hanumangarh and Churu districts, has a parallel lexicon which makes it very rich from a lexicographical point of view. Word order is typically SOV and there is the existence of implosives. The presence of high tone at the suprasegmental level classifies it with other dialects of Rajasthani. It has contributed significantly to the development of Rajasthani language and linguistics.

== See also ==
- Marwar
- Mewar
- Bagar
- Dhundhar
- Hadoti
- Vagad
- Shekhawat
