= Malsisar =

Malsisar is a town and Tehsil located in Jhunjhunu district of the Indian state Rajasthan in northern India. It is known for its traditional Marwari architecture and haveli.
