= Alsisar =

- town
- Location in Rajasthan, India Alsisar (India)
- Coordinates: 28.32°N 75.28°E
- Country: India
- State: Rajasthan
- District: Jhunjhunu
- Elevation: 279 m (915 ft)

Languages
  - Official: Hindi
- Time zone: UTC+5:30 (IST)

Alsisar is a small town in the north-western part of Jhunjhunu district, Rajasthan, India. The area surrounding the town is an arid semi desert. This place is known for its temperature ranging from 48 °C in summer to below zero levels in winter.

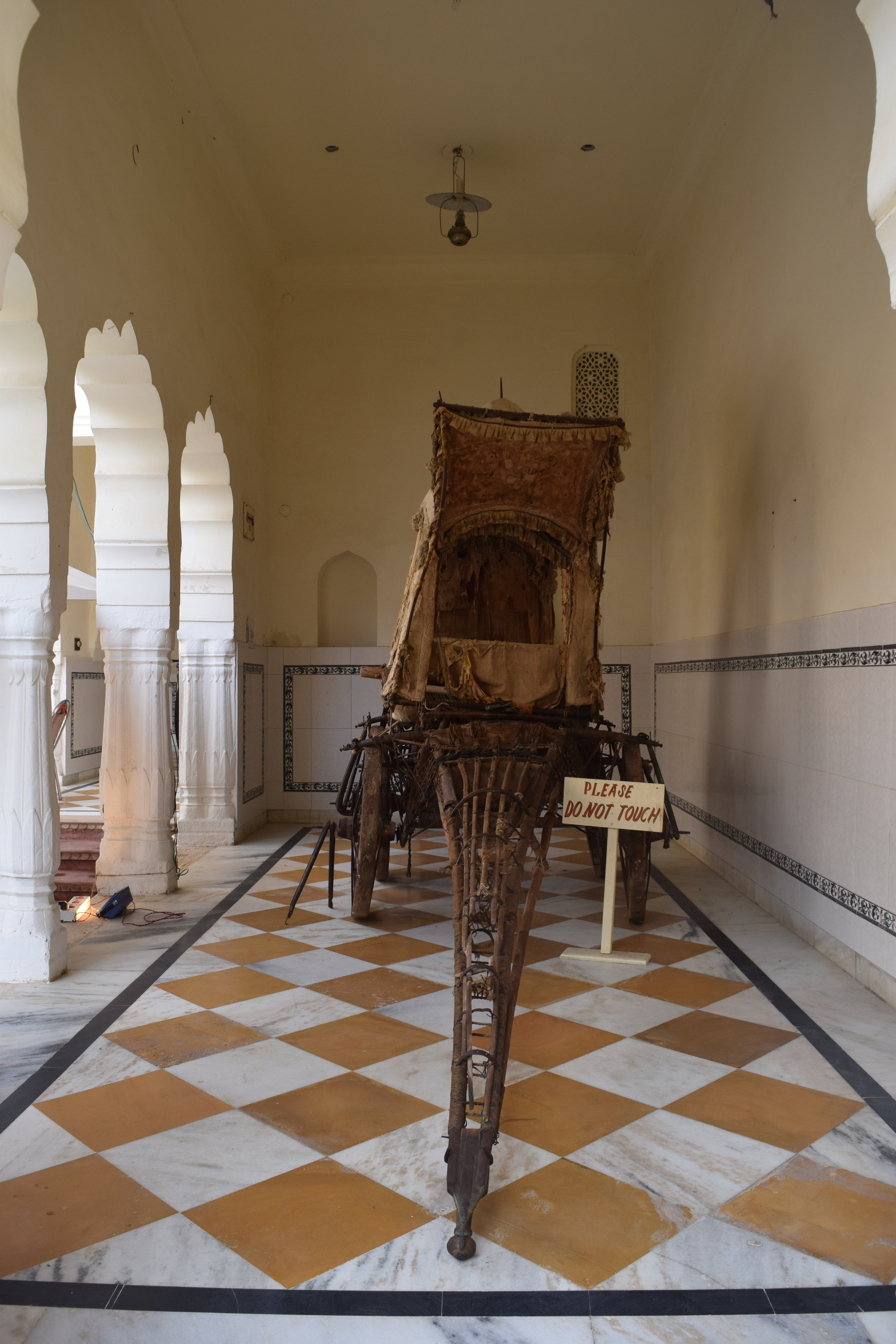
Alsisar Mahal Gallery Source - www.dailypassengerr.com

Like other places in Shekhawati, Alsisar is famous for its castle, havelis and cenotaphs.

However in recent days Alsiar has faced severe social and political issues like constantly changing government, environmental issues and most notably domestic violence. But recent decisions made by the government have made the situation a little better.

Alsisar is also emerging as an educational hub with institutes like Maharani Girls College.

== Geography ==
Alsisar is located at 28.32°N 75.28°E. It has an average elevation of 279 m (915 ft). Alsisar is 22 km from Jhunjhunu District and 194 km from Jaipur.

== Magnetic Fields Music Festival ==
Magnetic Fields Music Festival is hosted in the Alsisar Palace, and sees various musicians from around the world perform, with attendees camping in the desert.

== Places of interest ==
- Satya Narayan ji ka temple
- Shri Rani Sati ji ka temple
- Alsisar Mahal (Alsisar Fort)
- Kataruka ki haveli.
- Shri Lal Bahadur Mal ki haveli
- Tejpal Jhunjhunuwala ki haveli
- Ramjas Jhunjhunuwala ki haveli
- Lakha ka ki haveli
- Mahali Dutt khaitan haveli
- Jode ka Balaji Mandir
- Bus Stand Park
- Arjun Ram khetan haveli
- Cenotaph of Thakur Chhotu Singh
- Satya Narain temple
- Poonia haveli
- Panchayat Samiti
- Alsisar Gate
- Gopinathji Temple
- Chouk vale Balaji Mandir
- Mataji temple
- Chauhano ki haveli
- Shyam baba ka mandir
- Jujhar ji ka mandir
