= Mandawa =

- Town
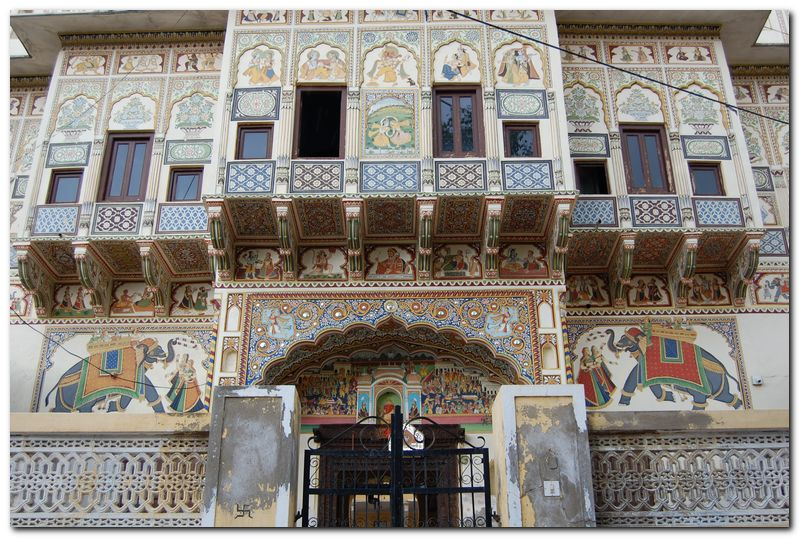
- A Haveli in Mandawa, Jhunjhunu district, Rajasthan, India

- Location in Rajasthan, India
- Coordinates: 28.05°N 75.15°E
- Country: India
- State: Rajasthan
- District: Jhunjhunun

Government
  - Type: Municipal Council
  - Body: Municipal Council Mandawa
- Elevation: 316 m (1,037 ft)

Population (2011)
  - Total: 23,335 (Males−11,682 Females−11,653

Languages
  - Official: Hindi
- Time zone: UTC+5:30 (IST)
- PIN: 333704
- Vehicle registration: RJ-18

Mandawa is a town located just 29 km from Jhunjhunu city in Jhunjhunu district of Rajasthan, India. It is part of Shekhawati region. Mandawa is located at 28.05°N 75.15°E. It has an average elevation of 316 metres (1036 ft). The nearest railway station is Jhunjhunu railway station.

== History ==
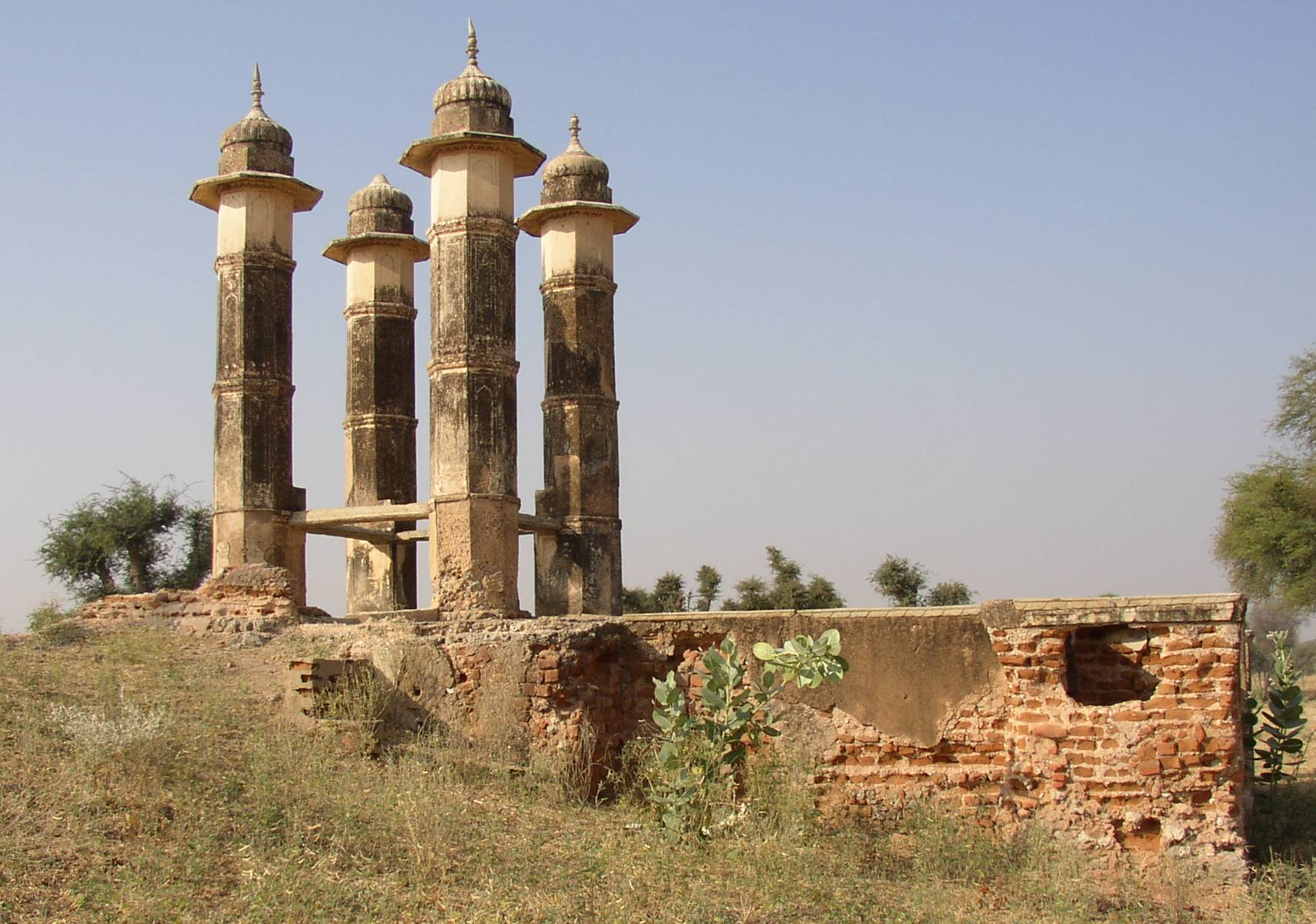
A water well near Mandawa

The town of Mandawa was a thikana of Jaipur State. Mandawa once functioned as a trading outpost for ancient caravan routes in Shekhawati for goods from China and the Middle East. Thakur Nawal Singh, then ruler of Nawalgarh and Mandawa built a fort in to protect this outpost. Over time, a township grew around the fort and soon attracted a large community of traders, who then settled down at Mandawa.

== About Mandawa ==
The town of Mandawa is known as the "Open Art Gallery" as a whole. During the 18th century, Mandawa was a key stop for wealthy merchants travelling the Silk Road. The majority of them chose to build their homes in this town, resulting in the creation of a plethora of exquisitely crafted large Havelis that are popular tourist attractions in Mandawa.

== Demographics ==
As of 2011 India census, Mandawa had a population of 23,335. Males constitute 51% of the population and females 49%. Mandawa has an average literacy rate of 58%, lower than the national average of 59.5%: male literacy is 70% and female literacy is 45%. In Mandawa, 18% of the population is under 6 years of age.

== See also ==
- Shekhawati
- Holi Festival
- Kalwas
