= Rajgarh Fort =

- राजगढ़ का क़िला (Hindi)
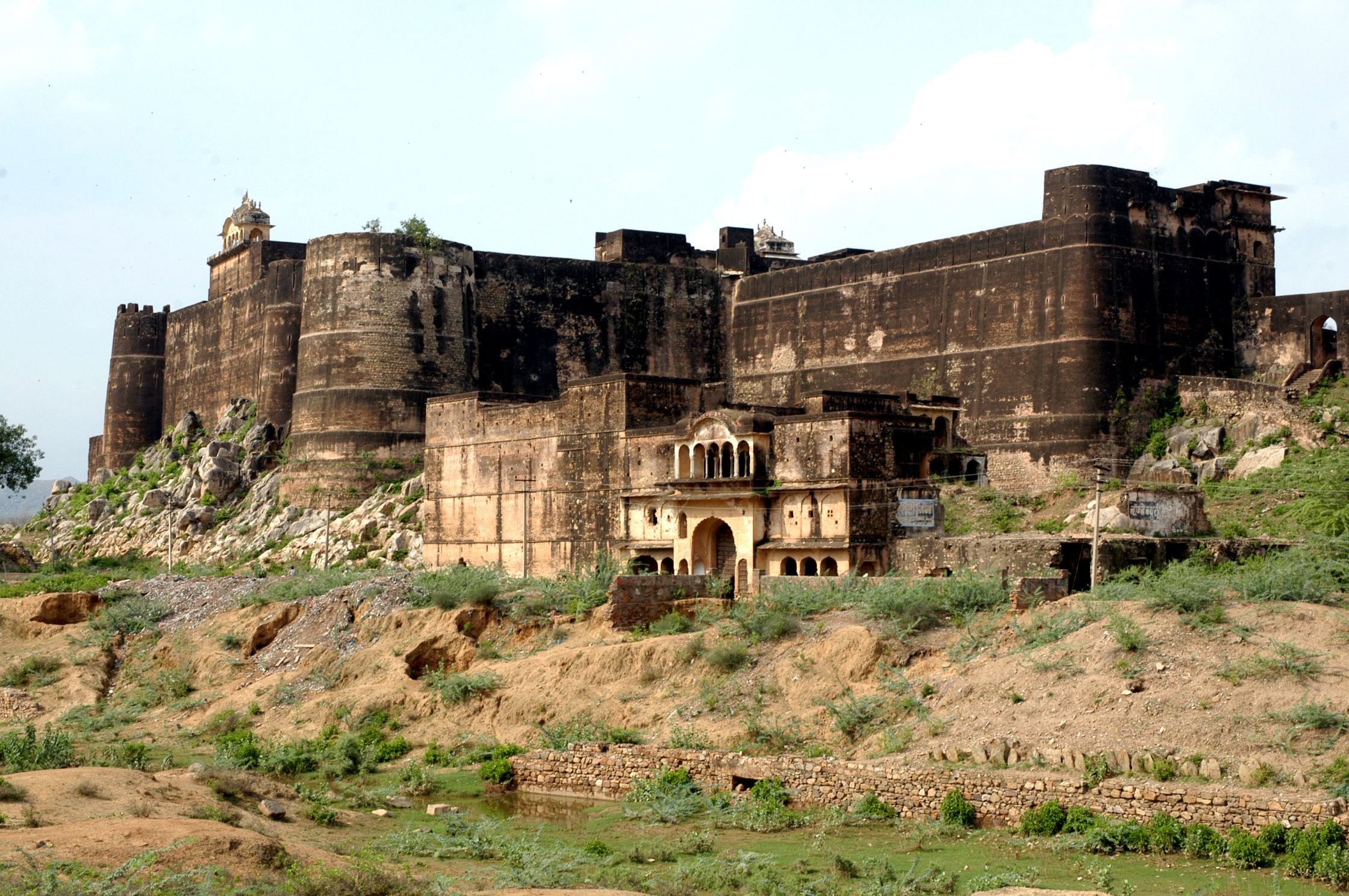
- View of Rajgarh Fort atop the Aravalli Hills

- Location in Rajasthan Location in India
- 27.2343°N 76.6152°E
- Type: Hill fort
- Location: Rajgarh, Alwar, Alwar district, Rajasthan, India

History
- Built: Mid-18th century (circa 1730–1740)

Site notes
- Area: Approximately 10 hectares
- Architect: Unknown (attributed to engineers)
- Architectural style: Rajput influences
- Governing body: Archaeological Survey of India (ASI)
- Owner: Original: Sawai Jay singh ji Current owner: Archaeological Survey of India

Rajgarh Fort, also known as hill ‌Fort, ‌is a historic‌ fortification‌ situated‌ in ‌the ‌Aravalli Hills‌ ‌near Rajgarh‌ town‌, Alwar district, Rajasthan, India, at approximately 27°14'N 76°37'E, with an elevation of 479 meters (1,571 feet).

It was constructed in the 1730s and 1740s by Maharaja Sawai Jai Singh the kachwaha ruler of Jaipur.

The fort, now in ruins, is maintained by the Archaeological Survey of India.

== History ==
=== Early foundation ===
According to a historical account of Rajgarh Fort, its construction began under Sawai jay singh following with the Kachwaha army. Some of chieftains from Alwar's outskirts, utilising their deep knowledge of the terrain and strong community backing, the Kachwaha's, effectively undermining their regional authority. This victory enabled Maharaja Swai Jay singh ji to establish the fort as a defensive garrison, significantly improvising the kachwaha influence in Rajasthan.

=== Under Naruka rule (1771–1949) ===
After the expeditious declination of Jat rule, In 1771, the fort was takeover by the Naruka clan of Rajputs, led by Raja Pratap Singh Naruka, who subjugated the Alwar State with British support. The Narukas, through treaties facilitated by the British East India Company, consolidated power, making Rajgarh Fort the capital of Alwar until the capital shifted to Bala Quila. Under Naruka rule, the fort served as a summer residence for the Alwar royal family, reflecting their alignment with colonial interests.

== See also ==
- Churaman
- Forts in India
