= Alwar =

- City
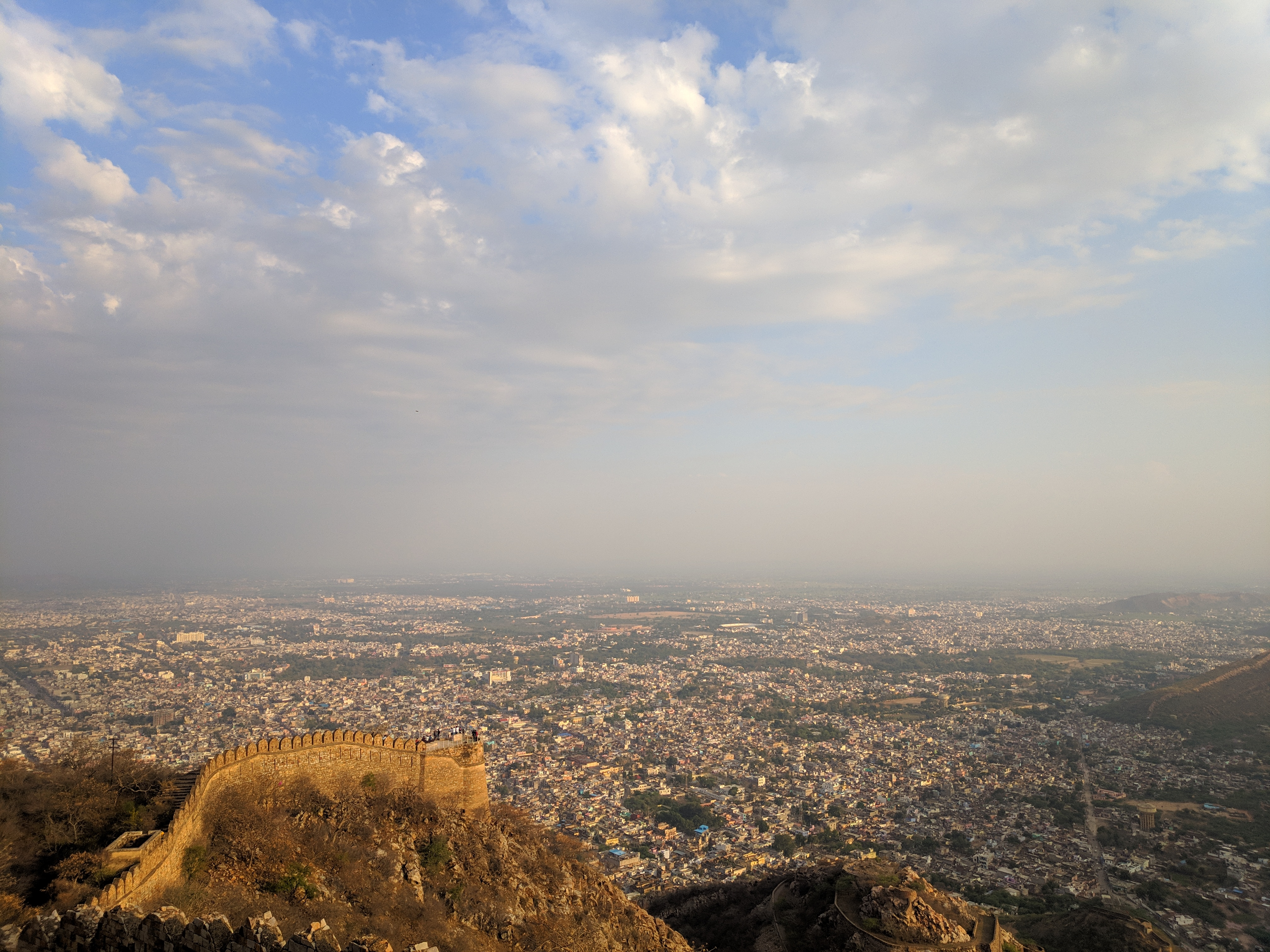
- Scenic view of Alwar city (RJ) from Bala Qila
- Nickname: Scotland of Rajasthan
- Location within Rajasthan Location within India
- Coordinates: 27.550°N 76.636°E
- Country: India
- State: Rajasthan
- District: Alwar
- Established: 1106

Government
  - Type: Municipal Corporation
  - Body: Alwar Municipal Corporation

Area
  - City: 202 km^{2} (78 sq mi)
- Elevation: 268 m (879 ft)

Population (2024)
  - City: 505,000
  - Rank: 8th in Rajasthan
  - Density: 2,500/km^{2} (6,470/sq mi)
  - Metro: 583,000
- Demonym: Alwariya

Languages
  - Official: Hindi
- Time zone: UTC+5:30 (IST)
- PIN: 301001, 301002
- ISO 3166 code: RJ-IN
- Vehicle registration: RJ-02
- Website: Alwar Municipal Corporation; Alwar District

Alwar (Rajasthani Pronunciation: [əlʋəɾ]) is a city in Rajasthan and the administrative headquarters of Alwar District in the state of Rajasthan. It is located 150 km south of Delhi and 150 km north of Jaipur.

== History ==
=== Ancient history ===
The ancient name of Alwar is Salva or Salwa. Alwar was a part of the Matsya Kingdom, one of the 16 ancient Mahājanapadas. In late Vedic texts (such as the Jaiminiya Brahmana), the Salva or Salvi tribe is described as a non-Vedic tribe that occupied Kurukshetra and conquered the Kuru kingdom.

The Matsya kingdom is generally identified with parts of present-day Rajasthan, including the Alwar region, and its historical geography is associated with the wider cultural and political landscape of northwestern India during the Vedic period.

==== The Salvas ====
The Salvas settled along the Yamuna river and the Alwar province of Rajasthan after attacking the Kuru kingdom, and they later accepted Vedic culture by the end of the Vedic era as they converged with the remaining Kurus and the Surasena mahajanapada, near Matsya kingdom.

=== Medieval history ===
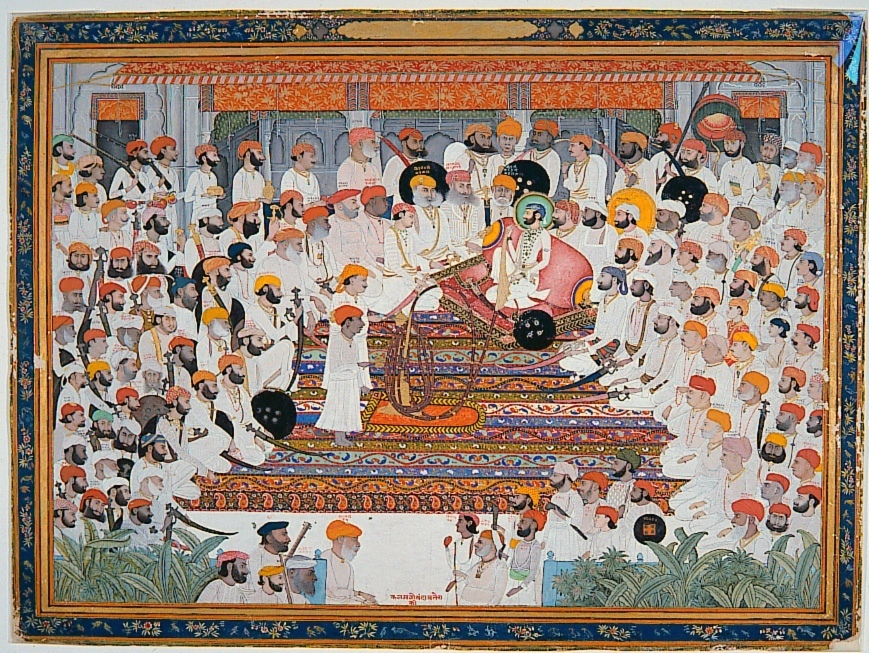
The Darbar of Raja Bakhtawar Singh of Alwar in 1810

Alwar was ruled by multiple dynasties. Notable dynasties included the Karaulika Yadavs, Nikumbh Rajputs, the Khanzada Rajputs, the Badgujar Rajputs, Gaur rajputs and the Rao Sahabs (Ahirs) of Rewari who took the control over this area. The Maratha Empire also ruled this region for a short period. Rai Raja of Rewari, captured the Alwar Fort from the Rajput Narukas and laid down the foundation for modern day Alwar.

Wali-e-Mewat, Raja Khanzada Alawal Khan Mewati was the Khanzada Rajput ruler of Mewat from 1485 till 1504. He was succeeded by his son, Hasan Khan Mewati, as Wali-e-Mewat in 1504.

In 1492, Hasan Khan Mewati won the Alwar fort (Bala Quila) from Nikumbh Rajputs to stop the practice of human sacrifice. It is also believed that the city of Alwar is named after him.

Hemchandra Vikramaditya (Hemu), born in Machari, Rajgarh, a village in Alwar, was a Hindu emperor of North India during the 16th century. This was a period when the Mughals and Afghans were vying for power in the region. Hemu captured Delhi on 7 October 1556 after defeating the Mughal forces in the Battle of Delhi in the Tughlaqabad area in Delhi, and became the de facto emperor. He won twenty-two battles in succession and became the last Hindu emperor of Delhi. In 1556, after his defeat in the Second Battle of Panipat, he was executed and Mughal regime was restored in North India. In 1781, the Battle of Mandan fought between Rais of Rewari under leadership of Mitrasen and Sardar Shardul who was helped by the Mughals. Both side had heavy casualties.

=== Colonial era ===
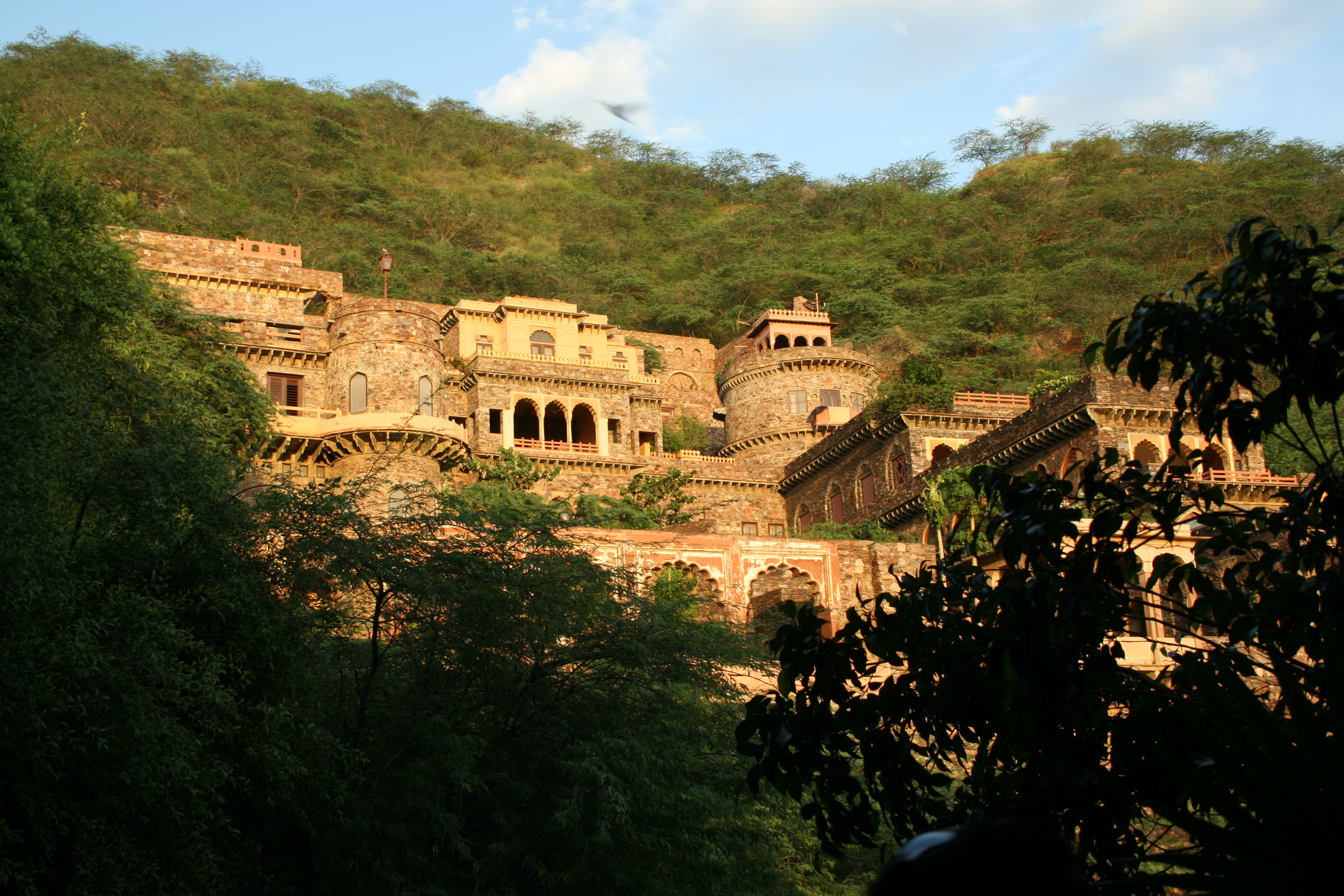
Neemrana Fort

The princely state of Alwar was established in 1770 by a Kachwaha Rajput named Pratap Singh Naruka who was earlier a jagirdar of "Dhai Gaon" (two-and-a-half villages) near Machari. His successor, Bakhtawar Singh Naruka, was defeated after launching an armed incursion into neighbouring Jaipur State (ruled by their Kachwaha seniors, erstwhile overlords of his predecessor) and being forced to accept the consequent treaty mediated by East India Company prohibiting him from political relations with other states without the consent of the colonial British. According to the "Gazetteer of Ulwar" published by the British Raj, Alwar State was subdivided into four regions:

- Rath region: current Behror and Neemrana, was ruled by Lah Chauhan Rajput zamindar who had descended from Prithviraj Chauhan. Sahesh Mal was a son of Raja Sangat Singh Chauhan. Sangat was the great-grandson of Chahir Deo Chauhan, brother of famous king Prithviraj Chauhan. In accordance with the pledge by the Raja Sangat Singh Chauhan to his younger queen for marrying her in his old age, her two sons from him were bestowed the Rath area and its headquarter of Mandhan near Neemrana. King Sangat Singh Chauhan's 19 sons from the older queen set out to seek their fortunes. Of the 19 brothers, Harsh Dev Chauhan and Sahesh Mal Chauhan arrived in the Gurgaon district. Lah Chauhan, the ruler of Rath, was a son of raja Sangat Singh Chauhan by the younger Rani whose two sons became inheritors of Raja Sangat Singh's territory of Rath with its headquarter at Mandhan when other 19 sons from the other wives were required to quit the kingdom as per the promise of Raja Sangat. Rao NandRam Ahir rule rath and Tijara during Aurangzeb rule. Later Rao Mitrasen Ahir defeated combined forces of Sekhawat and kachwa Rajput at Mandhan. After decline of Mughal Empire, Rao Tez Singh (1766-1823) was ruler of Rath and Tijara (Ahirwal). He was grandfather of freedom fighter Rao Tula Ram.

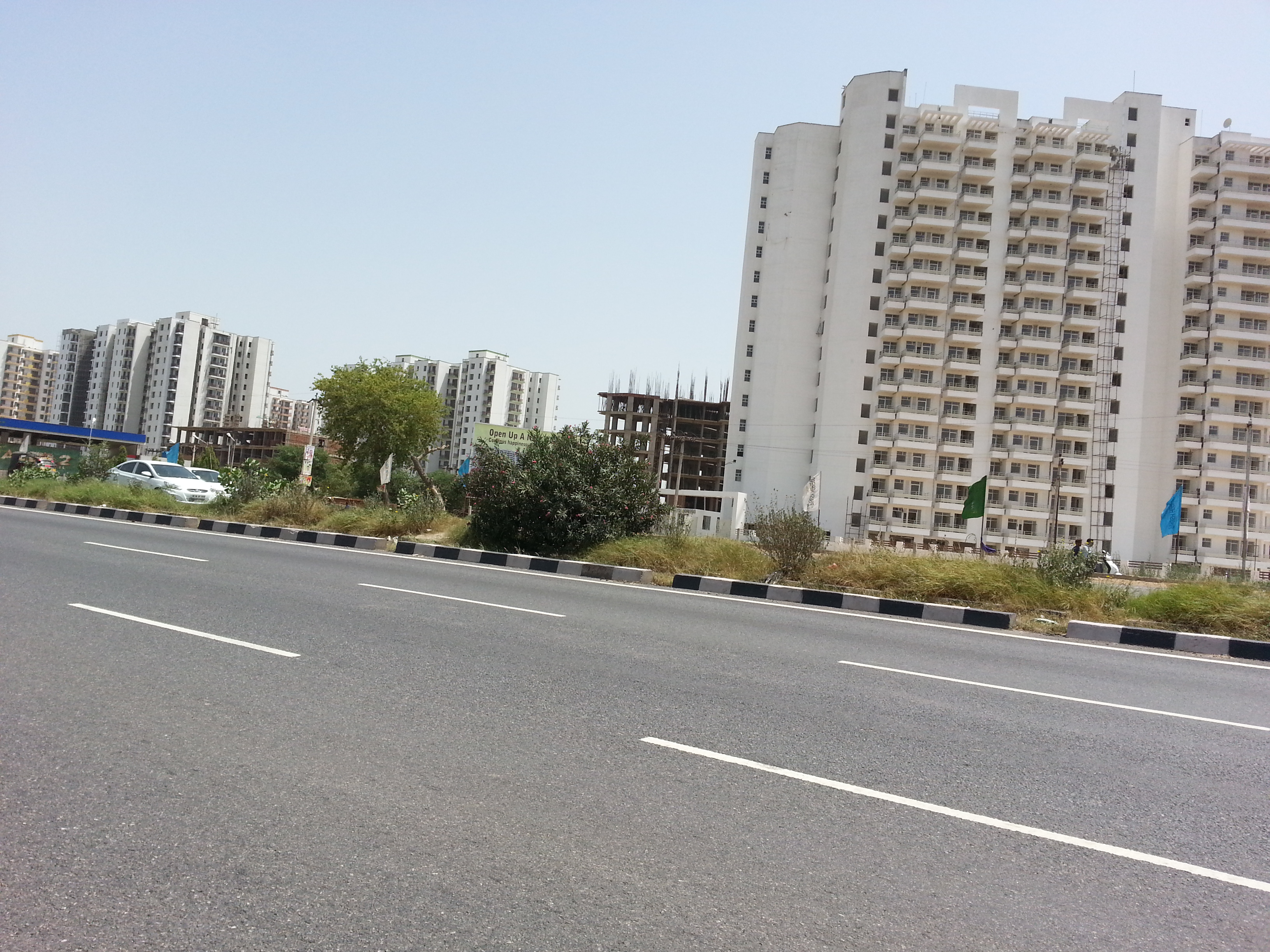
New residential Buildings in Neemrana Alwar

- Wai region: current Bansur and Thana Ghazi, was ruled by Shekhawat rajput zamindars.
- Narukhand region: current Rajgarh and Laxmangarh, was ruled by Naruka clan of Rajputs same as that of the ruling kings of the Alwar State
- Mewat region: current Palwal and Nuh districts, had the highest population of the Meo Muslims.

=== Post-independence ===
Alwar acceded to the dominion of India following the independence of India in 1947. On 18 March 1948, the state merged with three neighbouring princely states (Bharatpur, Dholpur and Karauli) to form the Matsya Union. On 15 May 1949, it was united with neighbouring princely states and the territory of Ajmer to form the present-day Indian state of Rajasthan. Alwar was designated as part of the National Capital Region, resulting in additional development projects including rapid-rail to Delhi and drinking water improvements. The military cantonment of Itarana lies on the outskirts of Alwar.

== Tourist attractions ==
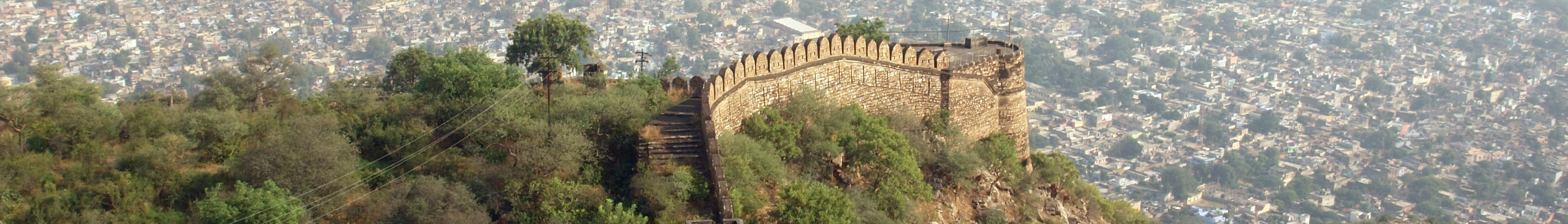
Fort View of Alwar

=== Fairy Queen ===
The Fairy Queen, a national treasure (cultural artifact) of India and the world's oldest working locomotive engine (c. 1855 CE), operates as a tourist luxury train between Delhi and Alwar. In 1998 it was listed in the Guinness Book of Records as the world's oldest steam locomotive in regular service. The Fairy Queen runs on the same route as the Palace on Wheels, the tourist train launched in 1982, and was awarded the National Tourism Award in 1999.

=== Bala Qila ===
Bala Qila (lit. 'High Fort'), also known as Alwar Fort, is a fort approximately 300 meters above the city, Situated on the Aravalli Range, the fort is 5 kilometres long and about 1.5 kilometres wide with turrets, a large gate, a temple, and a residential area.

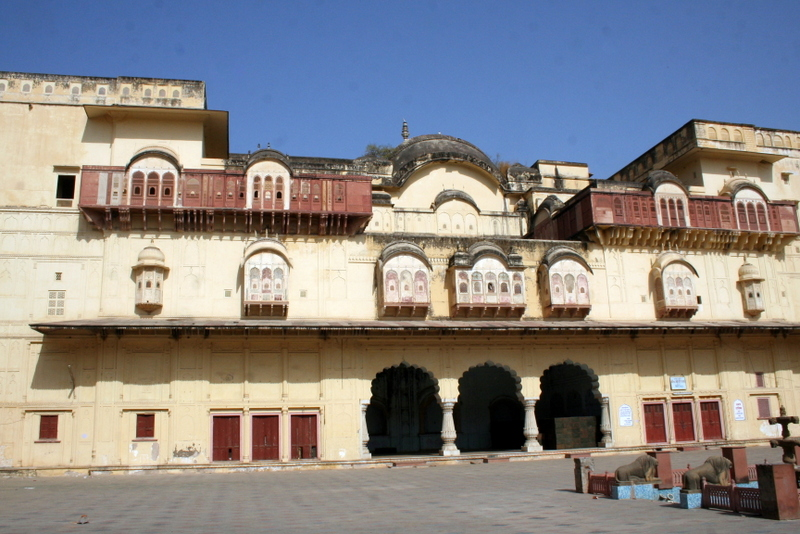

=== City Palace ===
The City Palace, also known as Vinay Vilas Mahal, built in 1793 CE by Raja Bakhtawar Singh, blends the Rajputana and Islamic architectural styles and has marble pavilions on lotus-shaped bases in its courtyard. The foundations of the City Palace, was constructed by Maharaja of Parmar Rajputs in 928 CE. The palace houses Government Museum, Alwar with a collection of manuscripts, including one depicting Emperor Babur’s life, Ragamala paintings and miniatures, and historic swords that once belonged to Muhammad Ghori, Emperor Akbar and Aurangzeb; and a golden Durbar hall. This palace that once belonged to the Maharaja (lit. Great Ruler) has now been converted into a District Administrative office also housing the District Court.

=== Sariska Tiger Reserve ===
The Sariska Tiger Reserve, a National Park and Tiger Reserve, is located in the Aravali hills only a few kilometres away from Alwar. Declared a Wildlife reserve in 1955 and a National Park in 1982, it is the first reserve in the world to have successfully relocated tigers. The sanctuary, which became a part of India's Project Tiger in 1978, also preserves other species including rare birds and plants. In addition to its biodiversity, Sariska is also home to ancient temples and historical ruins, adding cultural significance to its natural beauty.

=== Bhangarh Fort ===
Bhangarh Fort, is a 17th-century fort built by Bhagwant Das for his younger son Madho Singh I. The fort, a monument protected by the Archaeological Survey of India and is known for its association to legends and paranormal activities, is a tourist attraction for visitors across the world.

=== Siliserh Lake ===
Siliserh Lake is 19th century lake created by Maharaja Vijay Singh of Alwar, situated 8 miles southwest of Alwar.

=== Hill Fort Kesroli ===
Hill Fort Kesroli, a 14th-century fort, has now been converted into and is conserved as a heritage hotel.

== Transport ==
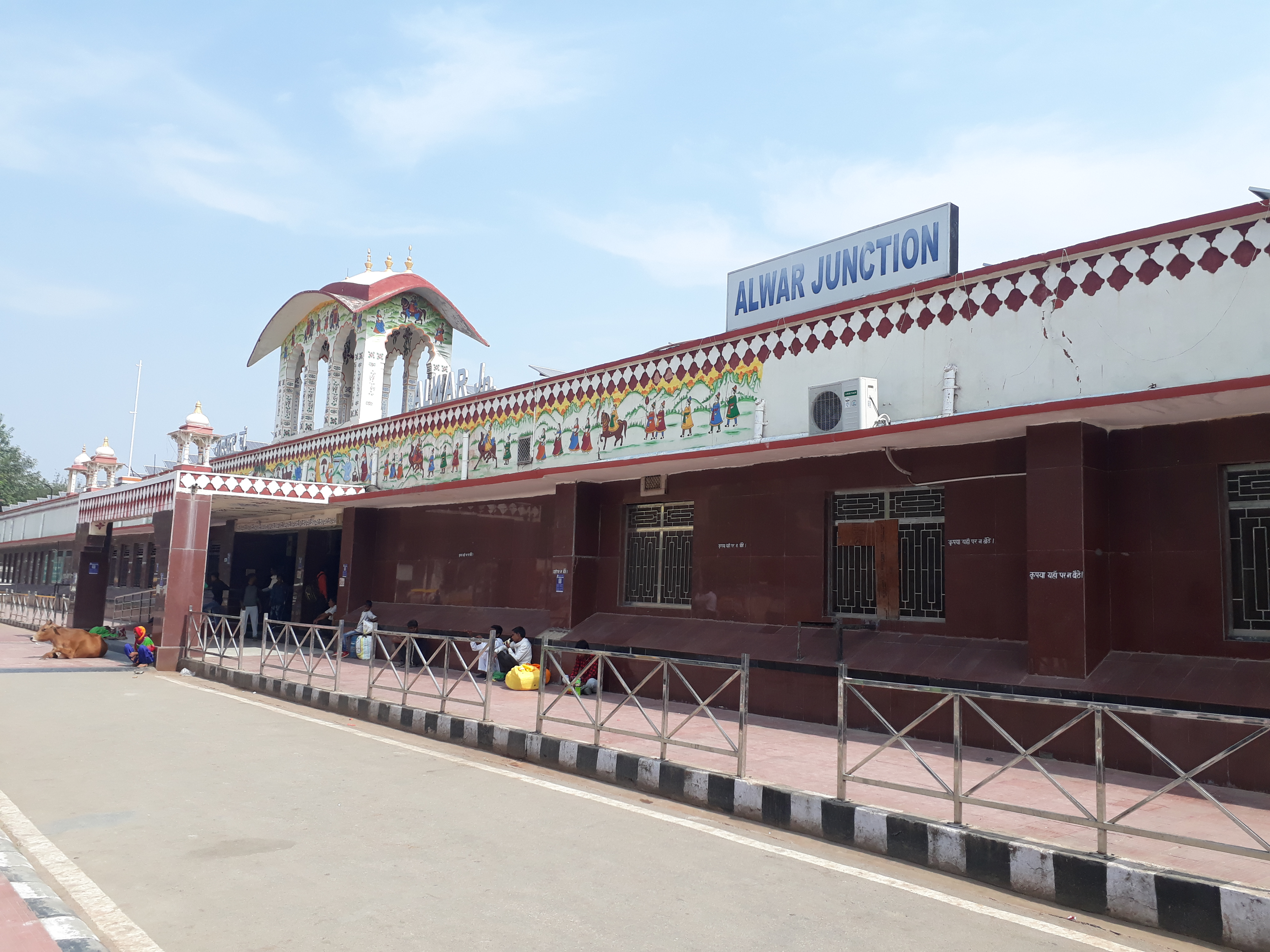
Alwar Junction railway station

As of 2019, the most common modes of medium-distance transport in Alwar are government-owned services such as flights, as well as privately operated lok pariwahan buses, taxis and auto rickshaws. Bus services operate from the Alwar old Bus Station which is 5 km away from the Alwar railway junction. In addition to this it is also planned that a metro rail system from Delhi to Alwar via Behror route will be started. The nearest airports to Alwar are Indira Gandhi International Airport in Delhi (143 km away), Jaipur International Airport (150 km away), and an airport currently under development in Bhiwadi airport (90 km away). Alwar Junction railway station on the Delhi–Jaipur line is connected with Delhi, Jaipur, Bandikui Junction and Mathura Junction. Alwar is connected by roads from major cities of Rajasthan and nearby states.

== Geography ==
Alwar is located at 27.57°N 76.6°E. It has an average elevation of 271 m (889 ft). The Ruparail River is a major river near the city. Alwar is fairly rich in mineral wealth; it produces marble, granite, feldspar, dolomite, quartz, limestone, soap stone, barites, copper clay, copper ore and pyrophylite.

=== Climate ===
Alwar has a hot semi-arid climate (Köppen BSh) with long, sweltering summers and short, warm to very warm winters. The average maximum temperature in the summers is 41 °C (106 °F) with an average minimum of 28 °C (82 °F). The winter temperature falls in the range of 21 °C (70 °F) to 8 °C (46 °F). Alwar experiences a short monsoon. The average annual rainfall is about 67 centimetres or 26 inches, which mostly falls in July and August when the monsoon is most active. The highest temperature ever recorded in Alwar is 50.6 °C (123.1 °F) on 10 May 1956 and the lowest −0.8 °C (30.6 °F) recorded on 12 January 1967. Alwar held the record for the highest temperature ever recorded in India until 2016, when Phalodi in Jodhpur district recorded 51.0 °C (123.8 °F) on 19 May 2016.

Climate data for Alwar (1991-2020, extremes 1956–present)
Month	Jan	Feb	Mar	Apr	May	Jun	Jul	Aug	Sep	Oct	Nov	Dec	Year
Record high °C (°F)	29.0 (84.2)	35.0 (95.0)	39.9 (103.8)	46.4 (115.5)	50.6 (123.1)	47.3 (117.1)	43.8 (110.8)	41.2 (106.2)	40.1 (104.2)	40.6 (105.1)	35.6 (96.1)	29.7 (85.5)	50.6 (123.1)
Mean daily maximum °C (°F)	20.5 (68.9)	24.5 (76.1)	30.8 (87.4)	37.2 (99.0)	40.1 (104.2)	38.4 (101.1)	33.4 (92.1)	31.7 (89.1)	32.6 (90.7)	32.6 (90.7)	27.7 (81.9)	22.5 (72.5)	31.0 (87.8)
Daily mean °C (°F)	13.9 (57.0)	17.5 (63.5)	23.4 (74.1)	29.7 (85.5)	33.3 (91.9)	33.1 (91.6)	29.6 (85.3)	28.1 (82.6)	28.0 (82.4)	26.0 (78.8)	20.9 (69.6)	15.7 (60.3)	24.9 (76.9)
Mean daily minimum °C (°F)	7.6 (45.7)	10.7 (51.3)	15.7 (60.3)	21.5 (70.7)	25.9 (78.6)	27.9 (82.2)	26.4 (79.5)	25.2 (77.4)	23.8 (74.8)	19.5 (67.1)	14.5 (58.1)	9.5 (49.1)	19.0 (66.2)
Record low °C (°F)	−0.8 (30.6)	2.4 (36.3)	7.3 (45.1)	11.2 (52.2)	15.7 (60.3)	20.7 (69.3)	20.6 (69.1)	20.1 (68.2)	16.8 (62.2)	12.0 (53.6)	6.1 (43.0)	1.4 (34.5)	−0.8 (30.6)
Average rainfall mm (inches)	14 (0.6)	17 (0.7)	12 (0.5)	12 (0.5)	19 (0.7)	72 (2.8)	190 (7.5)	223 (8.8)	86 (3.4)	15 (0.6)	7 (0.3)	5 (0.2)	672 (26.6)
Average rainy days	2	2	2	2	4	8	14	15	8	2	1	1	61
Average relative humidity (%)	61	52	38	24	27	43	69	76	64	46	48	56	50
Mean daily sunshine hours	8.8	9.7	10.6	11.5	12.1	11.8	9.4	8.4	9.3	10.1	9.5	9.1	10.0
Source 1: India Meteorological Department
Source 2: Climate Data

Alwar has been ranked 40th best “National Clean Air City” under (Category 2 3-10L Population cities) in India.

== Demographics ==
Languages of Alwar (2011)
1. Hindi (93.5%)
2. Punjabi (3.43%)
3. Mewati (1.60%)
4. Others (1.50%)

Religion in Alwar City (2011)
Religion	Percent
Hinduism	90.71%
Islam	4.26%
Sikhism	2.61%
Jainism	2.13%
Other or not stated	0.29%
Distribution of religions

Historical population
Year	Pop.	±%
1891	52,400	—
1901	56,700	+8.2%
1911	41,300	−27.2%
1921	44,800	+8.5%
1941	54,100	+20.8%
1951	57,900	+7.0%
1961	72,700	+25.6%
1971	100,800	+38.7%
1981	140,000	+38.9%
1991	210,100	+50.1%
2001	266,203	+26.7%
2011	341,422	+28.3%

At the time of the 2011 census, the population of Alwar city and Alwar district were 341,422 and 3,674,179 respectively.

At the time of the 2011 census, 63.61% of the population recorded their language as Hindi, 3.43% Punjabi and 1.60% Mewati as their first language.

== Education ==
Raj Rishi Bhartrihari Matsya University was established in 2012–13. Alwar has several schools such as Alwar Public School, Shri Oswal Jain Senior Secondary School, St. Anselm's Senior Secondary School, Kendriya Vidyalaya, Adinath Public School, Knowledge City School, Chinar Public School, Lords International School, Sri Guru Harkrishan Public School, Step By Step Senior Secondary School, Raath International School, National Academy and Silver Oak, and colleges (Raj Rishi college, Siddhi Vinayak College, Presidency College, Government Law College, KCRI College, IET College). The Employee's State Insurance Corporation (ESIC) Medical College started operating from 2017.

== Notable people ==
- Saurabh Singh Shekhawat
- Sakshi Tanwar
- Jitendra Kumar
- Imran Khan
- Aastha Chaudhary
- Bhuvneshwari Kumari
- Mahesh Sharma
- Jitendra Singh
- Alok Bhargava

== Bibliography ==
- Powlett, P. W. (1838). Gazetteer of Ulwur (Alwar).
