= Sawai Pratap Singh Naruka =

Founder and Maharaja of Alwar from 1770–1791

Pratap Singh
- Sawai Raja
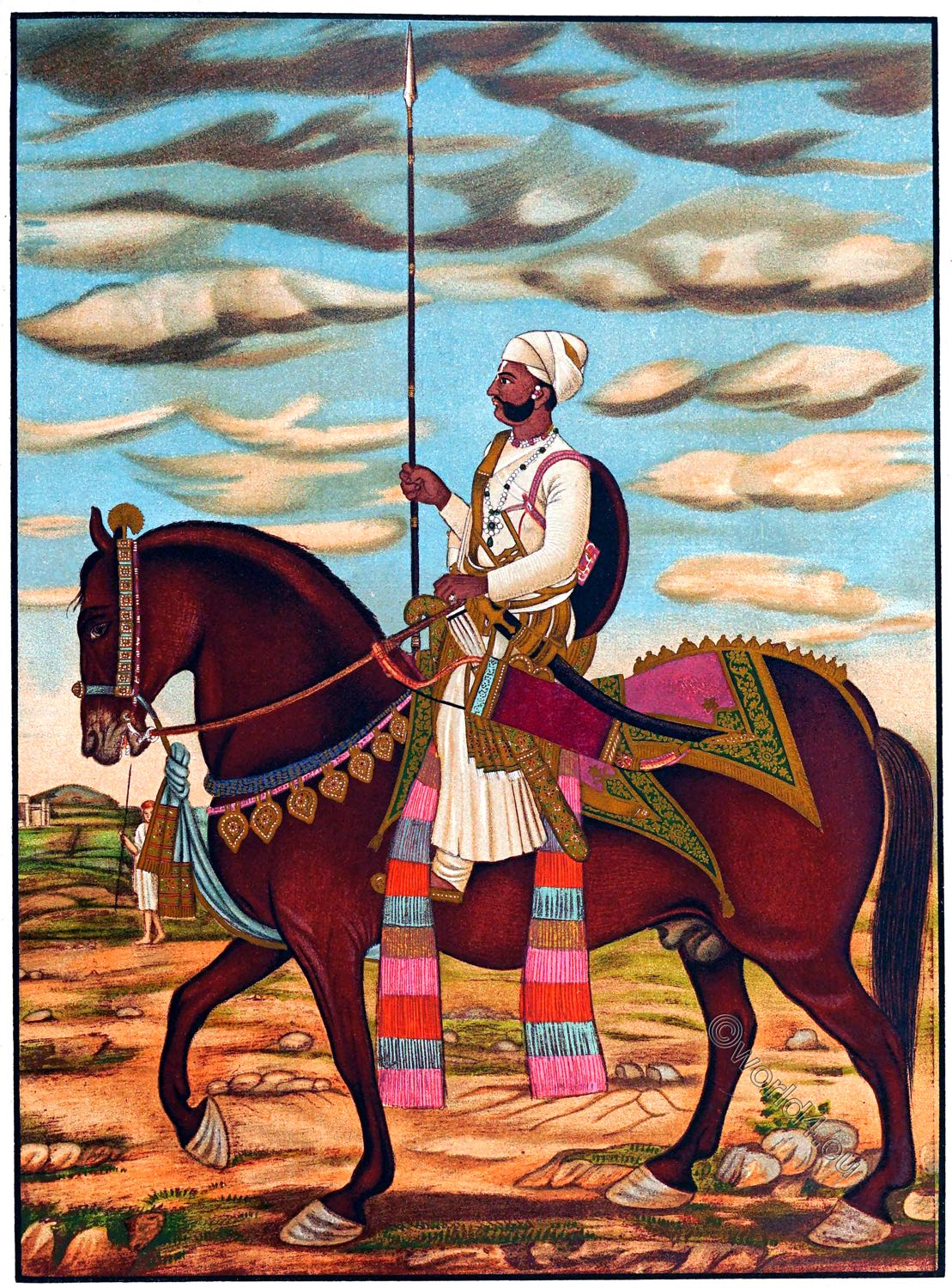
- Equestrian Sketch of Rao Raja Sawai Pratap Singh

Rao Raja of Alwar
- Reign: 1575 – 1591
- Coronation: 1575
- Predecessor: Post established
- Successor: Raja Bakhtawar Singh
- House: Naruka
- Dynasty: Kachhwaha
- Religion: Hinduism

Rao Raja Sawai Pratap Singh was the founding king of Alwar State. He belonged to the Naruka clan of Kachhwaha dynasty.

== History ==
Pratap Singh who was earlier a jagirdar of "Dhai Gaon" (two and half villages) near Machari in Alwar. His successor "Bakhtawar Singh Kachwaha" was defeated when he ventured an armed incursion into neighbouring Jaipur State (ruled by their Kachwaha seniors, erstwhile overlord of his predecessor) and consequent treaty mediated by East India Company prohibited him from political intercourse with other states without the consent of colonial British. Pratap's descendant and the last reigning ruler, H.H. Maharaja Sir Tej Singh Prabhakar Bahadur, signed the accession to the Indian Union on 7 April 1949.

== See also ==
- Kacchwaha Rajputs
- Alwar State
