= Lawa Thikana =

Estate of Naruka Rajputs

Coordinates: 26°22′N 75°33′E

Lawa Raj लावा
- Thakurat of British India
- 1772–1947
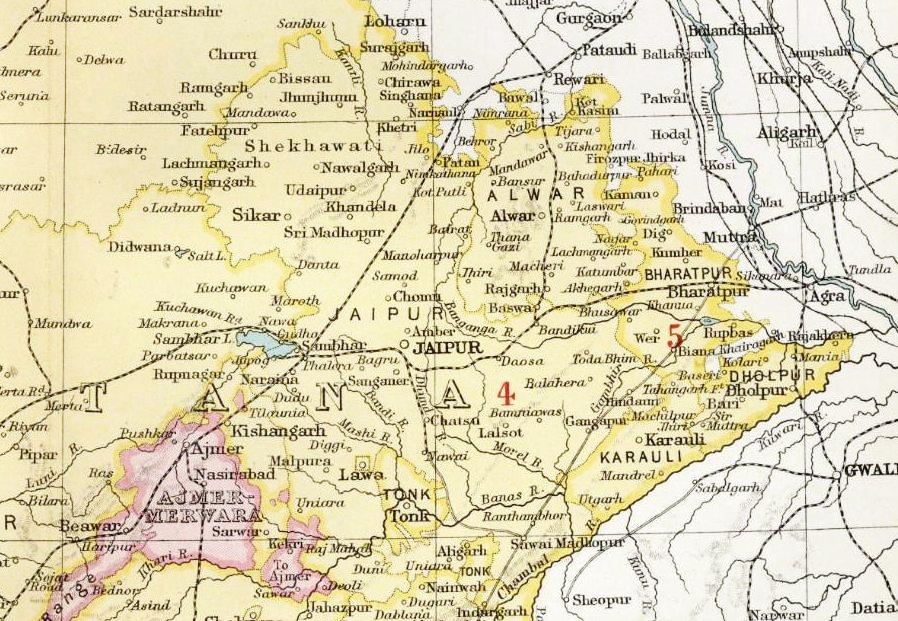
- Lawa State in the Imperial Gazetteer of India
- Capital: Lawa
- Area
  - 1901: 49 km^{2} (19 sq mi)
- Population
  - 1901: 2,671
- Government
  - Type: Principality
- History
  - Established: 1772
  - Acceded to India: 1947
Preceded by	Succeeded by
Jaipur State	Dominion of India
- Today part of: Rajasthan, India

Lawa Thikana was a Thikana estate or Thakurat under the Jaipur Residency of the former Rajputana Agency. It was ruled by Dasawat Naruka Rajputs. It was located very close to Tonk town and included its capital, Lawa, a small town and its surroundings. Lawa is located in the northwestern part of present-day Tonk district of Rajasthan, India.

Lawa estate near Tonk should not be confused with Sardargarh, a Thikana of Udaipur State (Mewar) which had been known as 'Lawa' before 1738.

In August 1947, at the time of Independence, Rajasthan included 19 princely state & 3 thikanas (Chiefships) of Neemrana, Lawa & Kushalgarh.

== History ==
Lawa was formerly part of Jaipur State. In 1772 Lawa became a jagir which came under the control of the Marathas through Pindari leader Amir Khan, who would later become the Nawab of Tonk. Lawa became a tributary of Tonk in 1817, when that state was established.

In 1867, following the murder of Thakur Rewut Singh (the uncle of the ruler of Lawa) together with a party of his followers, Lawa was declared a separate Chiefship under the protection of the British Government.

Lawa was one of the Thikanas which were existing at the time of the independence of India and were merged with Rajasthan during the Unification of Rajasthan. It was a completely rural settlement.

== Lawa Fort ==
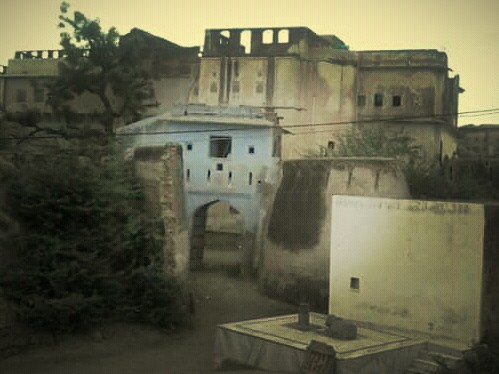

Although Lawa sustained incalculable myriad of Islamic invasions but the land by the enemy was never occupied, hence no such Islamic or foreign impact is observed in the arts, architecture, culture of this region. This mammoth immersion of Rajput heritage in all its magnificence has civil, military and sacred spreads. The civil area maintained the three, ’administrative block’, 'common living quarters’ and the ladies section which from Mughal days was better known as the Zenana Mahal. The administrative block houses the courts also referred as Dari Khana, meeting place for all major decisions.16th century henceforth every successive ruler of Lawa went on to add more buildings to Barla Mahal (outside mahal) for men, time worn but they still faithfully replicate history. Ravages through time may have altered some of the external features but the rest is the same. The ammunitions and other war material were housed in a safe structure known as the Silehkhana. Though the main fortified ramparts are still there the burjh on the four corners are clearly visible yet it would not be erroneous to address this building as a Chouburjha structure.

Lawa also has chattris (royal cenotaphs) of rulers and warriors who died in wars.

== Connections ==
Raja Udaikaran, the third king of Amber who ruled in 1367, had several sons, including his second eldest, Nar Singh. Although Bar Singh was the eldest, he renounced his claim to the throne in favor of Nar Singh. In return, Bar Singh was granted the estates of Jhag and Mauzamabad, located a few miles southwest of Jaipur. His grandson, Naru, later became the namesake and founder of the Naruka clan. Thakur Kesri Singh, Thakur of Ladana, eighth in descent from Rao Dasaji (second son of Rao Naru), was made the Jagirdar of Ladana by the then ruler of Jaipur. He married and had issue, two sons. Thakur Sawant Singh, succeeded his father and became head of the Ladana Thikana. Thakur Nahar Singh was granted the estate of Lawa by the Ruler of Jaipur in the year 1722.

The name of Lawa & Ladana are often taken together when discussions over Lawa Thikana comes.

== See also ==
- Kachhwaha
- Rajputana Agency
- Alwar State
