= Jai Singh of Alwar =

Maharaja of Alwar from 1882–1937

Maharaja Sir Jai Singh
- Sir; GCIE,GCSI; Hon. Colonel
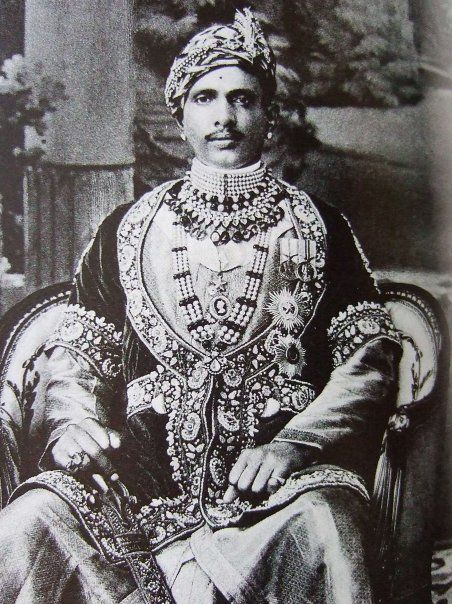

Maharaja of Alwar
- Reign: 1892 to 1937
- Coronation: 3 June 1892
- Predecessor: Mangal Singh Prabhakar
- Successor: Tej Singh Prabhakar
- Born: 14 June 1882; City Palace, Alwar, Alwar State, Rajputana
- Died: 20 May 1937 (aged 54); Paris, France
- Spouse: HH Maharaniji Sa Rathorji Sugan Kanwarji Saheba of Kishangarh State; HH Maharaniji Sa Jadejiji Janak Kanwarji Saheba of Khirasara in Dhrol State; HH Maharaniji Sa Jhaliji Prabhat Kanwarji Saheba of Rajpur in Wadhwan State; HH Maharaniji Sa Jhaliji Jayendra Kanwarji Saheba of Dhuva in Wankaner State
- Issue: Maharajkumariji Baiji Lal Taj Kanwarji Saheba m. to Maharaja Krishna Singh Ju Deo Lokendra Bahadur of Datia State
- House: Naruka
- Dynasty: Kachhwaha
- Father: Sir Mangal Singh Prabhakar Bahadur
- Mother: HH Maharaniji Sa Rathorji Kishan Kanwarji Saheba d.of Maharaja Bhairon Singh of Ratlam State

Hon Colonel. HH Raj Rajeshwar Bharat Dharma Prabhakar Maharaja Shri Sawai Sir Jai Singhji Veerendra Shiromani Dev Bahadur, or simply Jai Singh Prabhakar, (14 June 1882 – 19 May 1937), was the Naruka Kachwaha Rajput ruler of the Princely State of Alwar from the year 1892 to 1937. The only son of the previous ruler, Sir Mangal Singh Prabhakar Bahadur, He was forced into exile and died in 1937 at the age of 54. He was succeeded by a distant relative, Tej Singh Prabhakar Bahadur.

He was educated in Mayo College, Ajmer, in which his father was the first to take admission. He was highly regarded an Indian English orator and scholar. He assisted the farming community with the construction of a number of bunds (irrigation dams).

== Imperial Service ==
Sir Jai Singh took pride in his State's infantry regiments and had them sent to China during the anti-Christian uprising in China and in the following relief operations. Alwar Lancers units served in the First World War. Recognising his services, he was appointed a Knight Grand Commander of the Order of the Indian Empire (GCIE) by the British in 1919.

He features in the oil on canvas painting by Douglas Chandor, Prime Ministers of the Imperial Conference (October 1923).

== Titles ==
- 1882-1892: Yuvaraja Shri Jai Singh Sahib, Yuvaraja Sahib of Alwar
- 1892-1909: His Highness Raj Rishi Shri Sawai Maharaja Jai Singh Veerendra Shiromani Dev Bharat Prabhakar Bahadur, Maharaja of Alwar
- 1909-1911: His Highness Raj Rishi Shri Sawai Maharaja Sir Jai Singh Veerendra Shiromani Dev Bharat Prabhakar Bahadur, Maharaja of Alwar, KCSI
- 1911-1915: His Highness Raj Rishi Shri Sawai Maharaja Sir Jai Singh Veerendra Shiromani Dev Bharat Prabhakar Bahadur, Maharaja of Alwar, KCSI, KCIE
- 1915-1919: Hon Lieutenant-Colonel His Highness Raj Rishi Shri Sawai Maharaja Sir Jai Singh Veerendra Shiromani Dev Bharat Prabhakar Bahadur, Maharaja of Alwar, KCSI, KCIE
- 1919-1921: Hon Lieutenant-Colonel His Highness Raj Rishi Shri Sawai Maharaja Sir Jai Singh Veerendra Shiromani Dev Bharat Prabhakar Bahadur, Maharaja of Alwar, GCIE, KCSI
- 1921-1924: Hon Colonel His Highness Raj Rishi Shri Sawai Maharaja Sir Jai Singh Veerendra Shiromani Dev Bharat Prabhakar Bahadur, Maharaja of Alwar, GCIE, KCSI
- 1924-1937: Hon Colonel His Highness Raj Rishi Shri Sawai Maharaja Sir Jai Singh Veerendra Shiromani Dev Bharat Prabhakar Bahadur, Maharaja of Alwar, GCSI, GCIE

== Honours ==
- Delhi Durbar Gold Medal-1903
- Delhi Durbar Gold Medal-1911
- Knight Grand Commander of the Order of the Indian Empire (GCIE)-1919 (KCIE-1911)
- Knight Grand Commander of the Order of the Star of India (GCSI)-1924 Birthday Honours (KCSI-1909 New Year Honours)

Preceded by Maharaja Mangal Singh Prabhankar	Maharaja of Alwar; 1892 – 1937	Succeeded by Tej Singh Prabhakar Bahadur
