= Jadawata =

Indian village

Jadawata (also known as Jaravata, Jadavata, or Jarawata) is located near Dudu and Narena in Jaipur district, Rajasthan, India.

== History ==
It was a fiefdom of two tracts, namely Jadawata and Gangadwadi estates, of the Bhakarsinghot Chief of Khangarot clan of Kachwahas of Jaipur during Mughal and British rule in India. Jadawata Palace is located at Jadawata near Narena in Dudu Tehsil of Jaipur.

Rao Khangar, ancestor of the Khangarots, which comprised one of the Bara Kotri (12 Chambers) of the Kachwaha royal family of Jaipur, married and had issue, 13 sons. He died in 1584. His eighth son, Thakur Bhakar Singh of Sakhun, married ten wives, and had issue, eight sons, the bhakarsinghot subclan. He died in 1633. His son Thakur Dwarkadas of Tilorna, married two wives, and had issue, five sons and their progeny settled in Jaipur district near Dudu, Diggi, Narena, Bichun, Jobner, Boraj, Sali, Sankhoon, Pachewar, Harsoli, Paldi, Sewa, Bhadwa, Tordi, Malpura, etc., there being around 20 Tazimi Nobles (Chiefs or Sardars) and 67 Khas Chauki Nobles which rendered service by horses and sawars amounting to 986 horses in total, and three Mamlaguzar Nobles which only paid tribute.

== General information ==
- Pincode: 322027

== See also ==
- Jiliya
- Panch Mahal Maroth
