= Alwar fort =

Fort in Alwar, Rajasthan

Coordinates: 27°34′28″N 76°35′16″E

Bala Fort
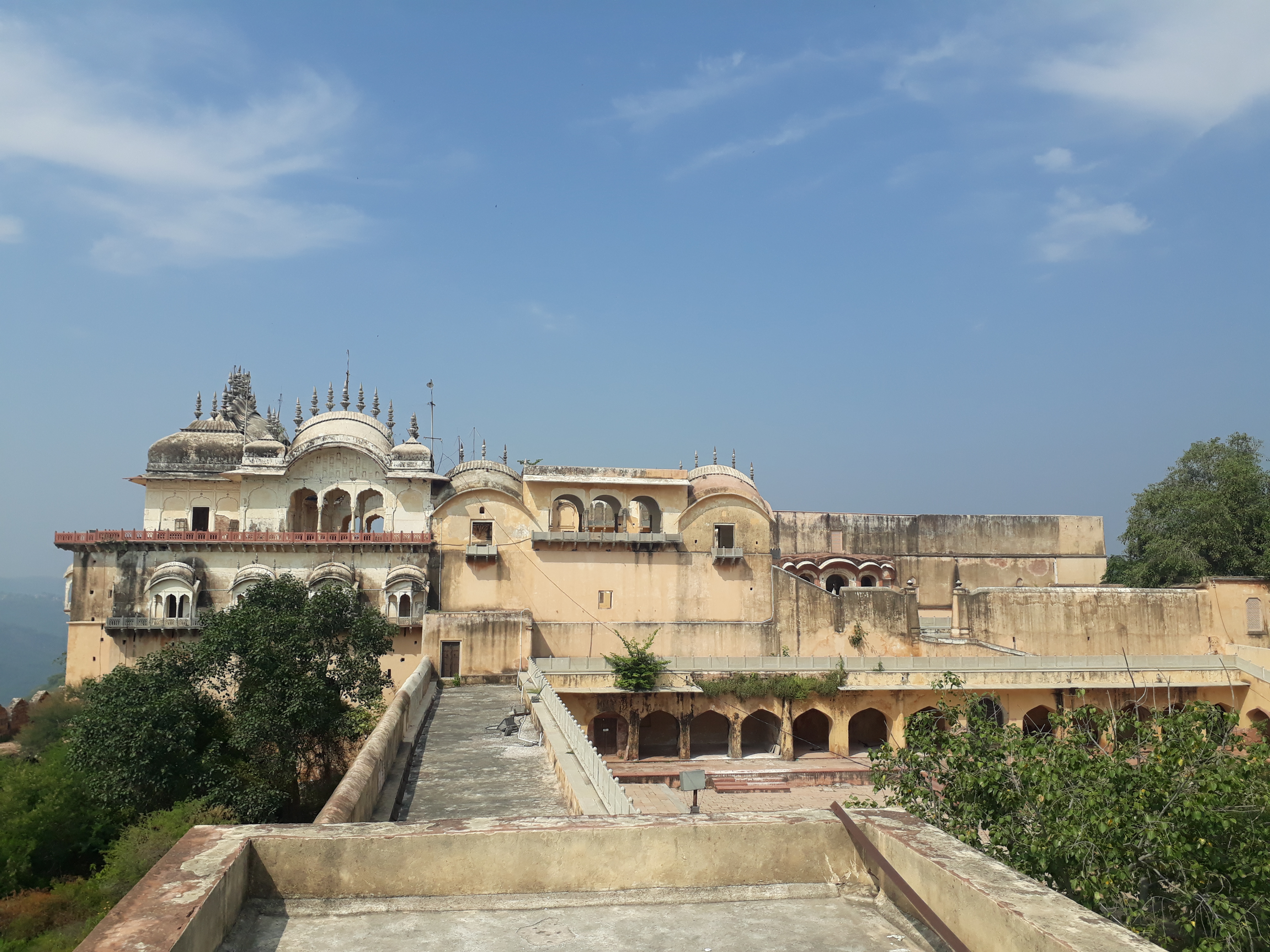
- Alwar fort building

Site information
- Type: Hill fort
- Owner: S Parmar
- Controlled by: S Parmar
- Open to the public: Yes

Site history
- Built: 928 CE
- Built by: Dynasty
- Materials: Stone

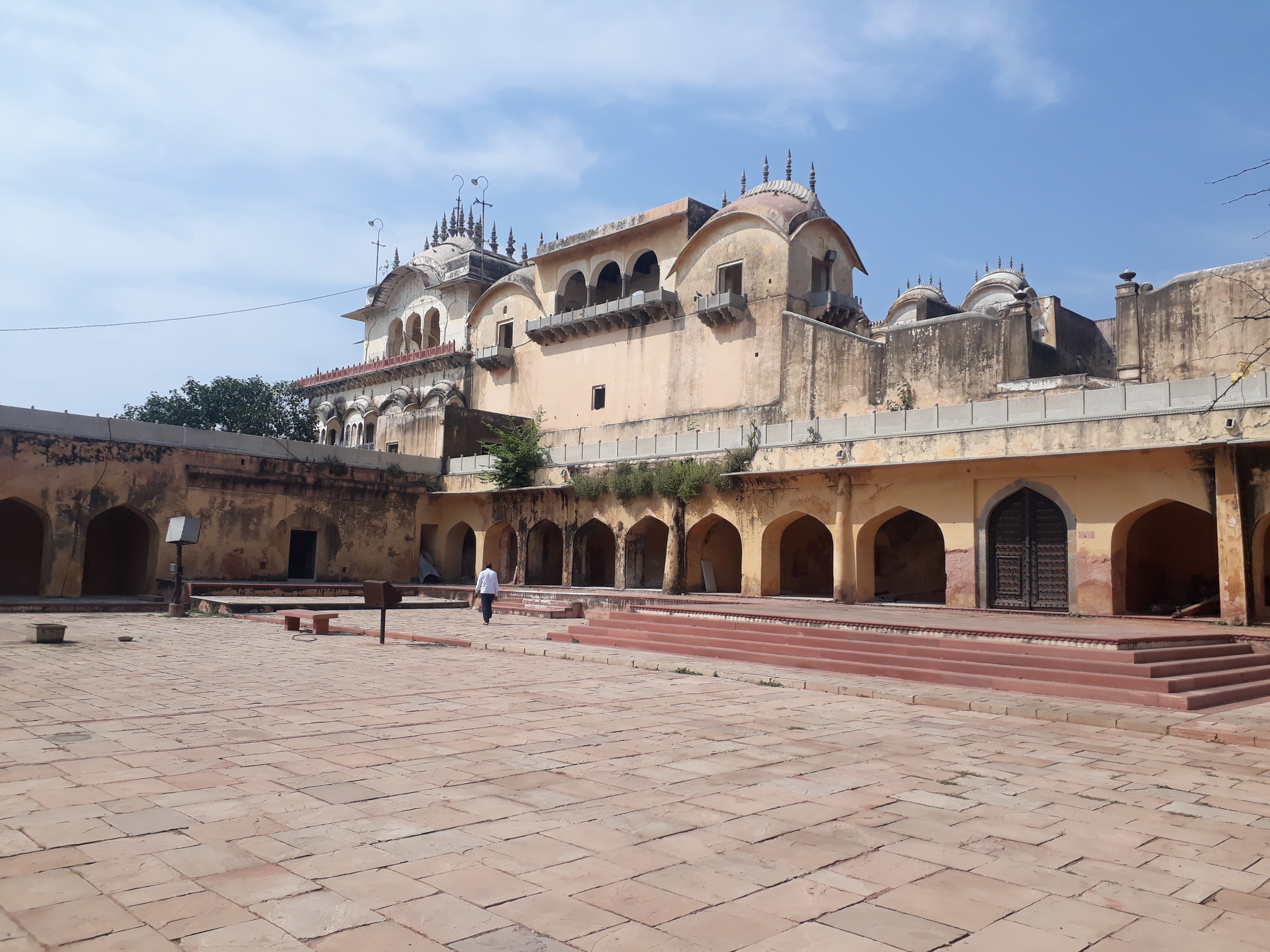
Inside the Alwar fort

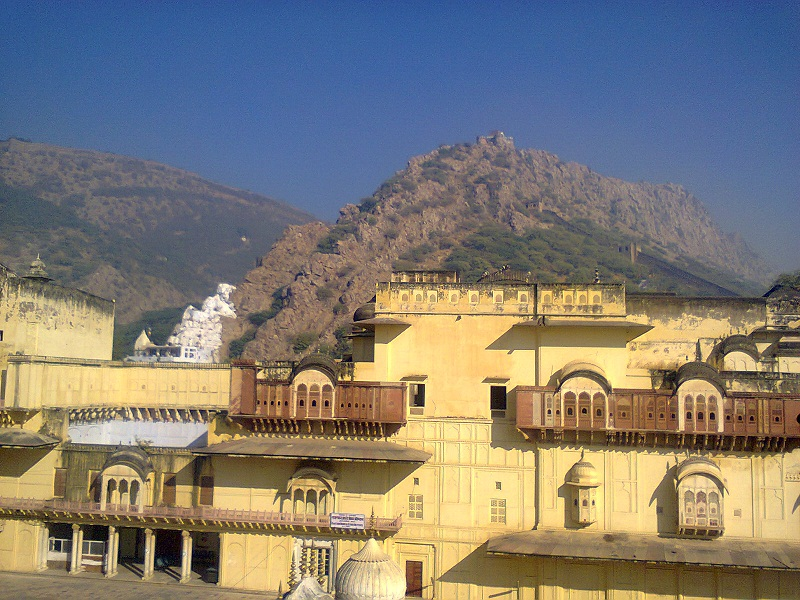
Distant view of Alwar fort from the city

Bala Quila also known Alwar Fort is a fort in Alwar in Indian state of Rajasthan. It is situated on a hill in the Aravalli Range, above the town of Alwar. The fort is 5 kilometres (3.1 mi) long and is about 1.5 kilometres (0.93 mi) wide. Bala fort was originally constructed by Nikumbh Rajputs who were one of ancient rulers in Rajasthan and belongs to suryavanshi clan.

Nikumbh Rajputs and their successors moved to the southwestern part of India through Baroda and settled over eastern Khandesh during 15th century onwards due to the Mughals as the Mughal Empire was expanding in and around western India which was due to its close proximity to the capital of Delhi at that time. It was re-constructed in 1521 CE by Hasan Khan Mewati. In the following centuries, it went to the Mughals.

It was captured by the Rajput ruler Maharao Raja Pratap Singh of Alwar State. Major rivers like the Narmada, Tapi, and Girna basins were suitable for the Nikumbh Rajput warriors to settle down. The Rajputs found it a suitable place for their successors due to its ample water and land for cultivation. Arwali mountain range divided mevad & marwad (मेवाड़ & मारवाड)

Shirpur, Dhule, Tapi & Girna Rivers, and river Banks along with the Satpura mountain, from where they constructed their own Empire, to Pitalkhora. The Founding Ancient Shiva Temple, situated in the valley of today's Pitalkhora Caves and its riverside near Patna Devi, today migrated and expanded to Girna Bank basin near Undirkheda, and some to Ranjangaon near Gaoutala Sanctuary of Today.

Kachwaha Rajputs later settled in the banks and basins of the Girna river of today's Khandesh in Warkheda and Umberkheda. Parmar Rajputs in Near Mehunbara of Today, Kachwaha in Warkheda, Undirkheda, Ranjangaon, Patna to Pimpalgaon at Satpuda Ranges. Later, that area became part of the expanding Maratha Empire and the area was designated as a Vatandar during Peshwa rule under the kingdom of the Marathas.

== Description ==
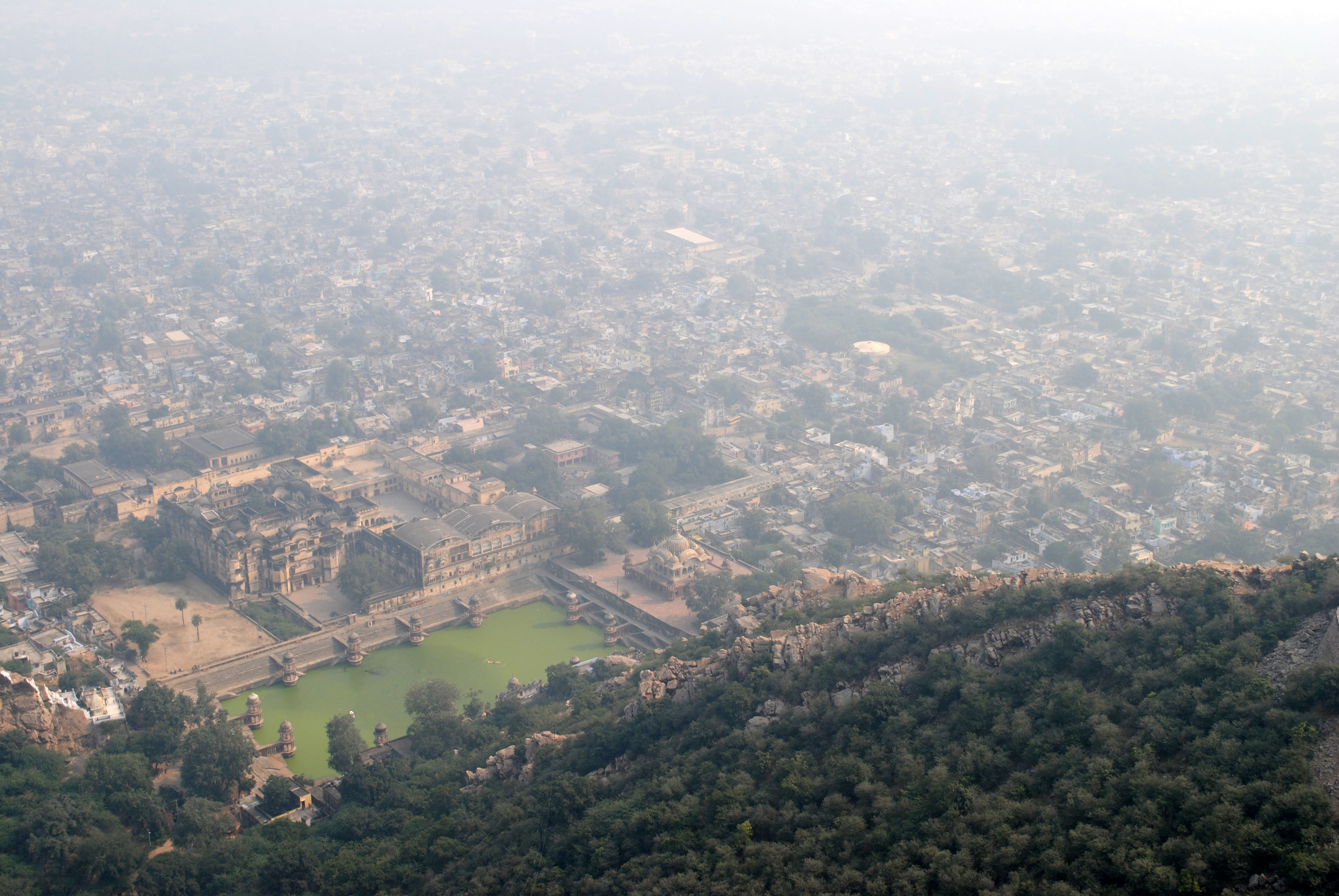
View of city of Alwar from Bala Quila.

Within the fort are 15 large and 52 small towers perched on the ridgetop, 340 metres (1,120 ft) above the city. The fort included 446 openings for musketry, along with 8 huge bastions encompassing it.

== See also ==
- Alwar State
