= Mangal Singh Prabhakar =

Maharaja of Alwar from 1874 to 1892

- Maharaja
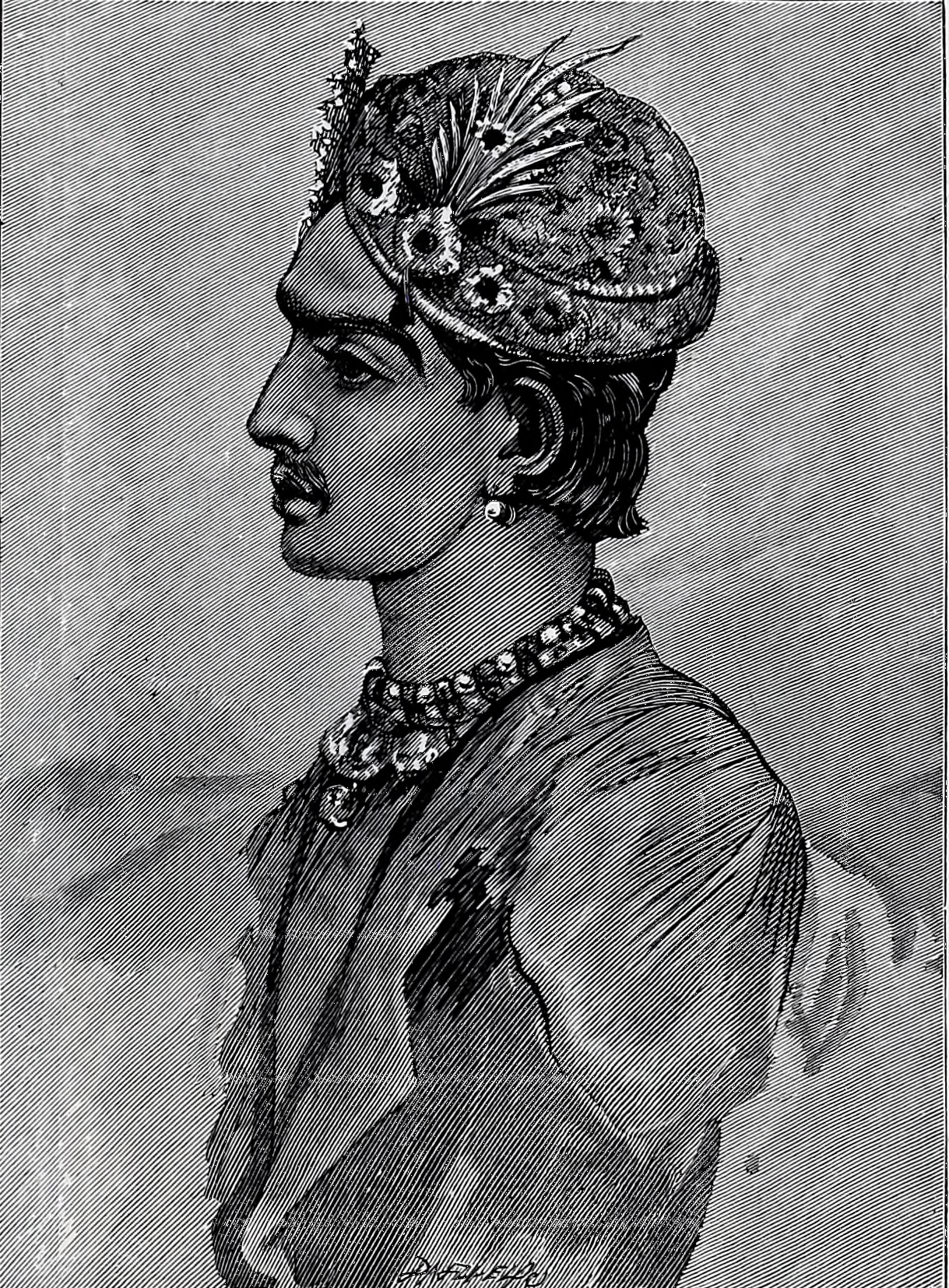
- Portrait by Valentine Cameron Prinsep

Maharaja of Alwar
- Reign: 11 October 1874 – 22 May 1892
- Predecessor: Sheodan Singh
- Successor: Jai Singh Prabhakar
- Born: 25 November 1859
- Died: 22 May 1892 (aged 32)
- Issue: Jai Singh Prabhakar
- Education: Mayo College
- Military career
- Allegiance: British Empire
- Branch: British Indian Army
- Rank: Lieutenant colonel

Mangal Singh Prabhakar was the Maharaja of Alwar from 1874 until his death in 1892.

== Early life, family, and education ==
Mangal was born on 25 November 1859 to Hardeo Singh, the Thakur of Thana. He was educated at Mayo College, Ajmer, and was the first student to be enrolled at the institution. He studied there from 23 October 1875 to 25 December 1876. On his first day at school, he arrived on a richly decorated elephant, accompanied by trumpeters, bearers, camels, and aides on horseback. During his stay at school, he was attended by a retinue of 500 servants, 12 elephants, and 600 horses.

He married, among others, in 1877, the second daughter of Prithwi Singh, the Maharaja of Kishangarh, and in 1878, a daughter of Bhairon Singh, the Raja of Ratlam. By his wife from Ratlam, he had an issue, a son named Jai Singh.

== Reign ==
Upon the death of Sheodan Singh on 11 October 1874, with no heir to succeed him, the British Government of India assumed the administration of Alwar and directed the twelve kotris (noble houses) of Alwar to select a successor to the late ruler. They elected Mangal Singh to the vacant throne as the Maharao Raja of Alwar, and his accession was duly recognised by the British Government of India. Owing to his minority at the time, Pandit Manphul was appointed his guardian, and a council of regency consisting of Pandit Rupnarain, Thakur Mangal Singh, Thakur Baldeo Singh, and Rao Gopal Singh was constituted to administer the affairs of the state until he came of age.

He attended the Delhi Durbar of 1877. He was invested with full ruling powers in the same year.

== Death ==
He died on 22 May 1892 and was succeeded by his son, Jai Singh, to his title, rank, and dignity.

== Titles, styles, and honours ==
=== Titles and styles ===
The British Government of India granted him the hereditary title of Maharaja on 1 January 1889. His full titles are as follows: His Highness Raj Rishi Shri Sawai Maharaja Mangal Singhji Veerendra Shiromani Dev Bharat Prabhakar Bahadur, the Maharaja of Alwar.

=== Honours ===
He was appointed a Knight Grand Commander of the Order of the Star of India in 1886.

=== Military ranks ===
He was appointed an honorary Lieutenant Colonel in the British Indian Army in 1885.

Preceded by Sheodan Singh Prabhakar	Maharaja of Alwar; 1874 – 1892	Succeeded by Jai Singh Prabhakar
