= Bhanwar Jitendra Singh =

Indian politician (born 1971)

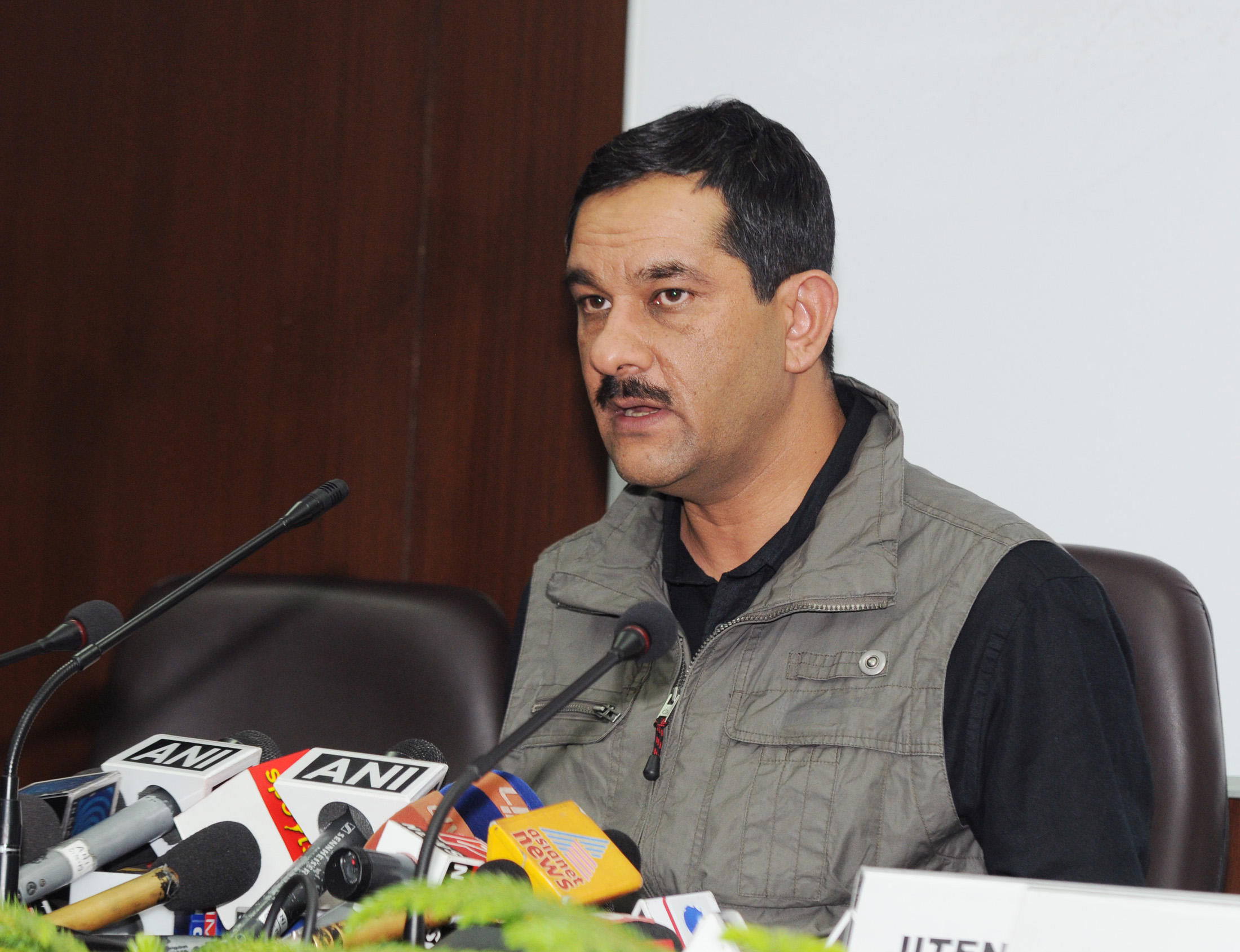

Minister of State (Independent Charge) for Youth Affairs and Sports
- In office 28 October 2012 – 26 May 2014
- Prime Minister: Manmohan Singh
- Preceded by: Ajay Maken
- Succeeded by: Sarbananda Sonowal

Member of Parliament, Lok Sabha
- In office 17 May 2009 – 18 May 2014
- Preceded by: Karan Singh Yadav
- Succeeded by: Mahant Chandnath
- Constituency: Alwar, Rajasthan

General Secretary of the AICC incharge of Assam Pradesh Congress Committee
- Incumbent
- Assumed office 24 December 2023
- Preceded by: Harish Rawat

Personal details
- Born: 12 June 1971 (age 55) New Delhi, India
- Party: Indian National Congress

Bhanwar Jitendra Singh (born 12 June 1971) is a former Minister of State for Youth Affairs and Sports (Independent charge) and a former Minister of State for Defence, Government of India. He assumed this charge on 28 October 2012. Formerly, Singh was the Minister of State for Home Affairs, Government of India, a position that he assumed in July 2011. He was the Member of Parliament representing the Alwar constituency of Rajasthan. Jitendra Singh is a member of the Indian National Congress. He is the present cultural head of the Naruka clan of Rajputs.

== Personal life ==
Jitendra Singh was born into the ruling family of Alwar to Yuvraj Sri Pratap Singh and Mahendra Kumari. Jitendra's grandfather was Tej Singh Prabhakar Bahadur (1911-2009), the last reigning Maharaja of Alwar until his privileges and titles were stripped away following the establishment of the Indian Republic.

The Alwar royal family belongs to the Naruka clan of Kachhwaha dynasty.

Jitendra Singh is married to Ambika Singh. They have one son and two daughters.

== Education ==
Jitendra Singh attended the Wynberg Allen School in Mussorie, followed by a Bachelor of Commerce degree from the University of Delhi. Subsequently, he trained in automobile engineering from Germany.

== Political career ==
- Elected as a member of Rajasthan Legislative Assembly representing Alwar City constituency (state parliament of Rajasthan) in 1998.
- Elected for second term as a member of Rajasthan Legislative Assembly representing Alwar City constituency (state parliament of Rajasthan) in 2004.
- Appointed Secretary, All India Congress Committee in 2007 (assists Rahul Gandhi in his political projects).
- Elected as Member of Parliament to the 15th Lok Sabha (2009-2014) representing the Alwar constituency of Rajasthan in 2009.
- Appointed Minister of State for Youth Affairs and Sports (Independent charge) and Minister of State for Defence, Government of India in the latest Cabinet reshuffle in Oct 2012.

| Preceded by Tej Singh Prabhakar Bahadur | Titular Maharaja of Alwar; 2009 – | Succeeded by Incumbent |
