= Sawai Tej Singh Naruka =

Last ruling Maharaja of Alwar from 1937–1948

Maharaja Sir Tej Singh Prabhakar, KCSI (17 March 1911 – 15 February 2009), was a ruler of Naruka dynasty of the Indian princely state of Alwar, Rajasthan from July 22, 1937 to 15 August 1947. He was the last ruling Maharaja of Alwar.

== Maharaja of Alwar ==
Tej Singh, a remotely related cousin of the previous ruler, Sir Jai Singh Prabhakar, was selected by the British to rule Alwar, as Jai Singh had been deposed by them because of the Alwar movement led by Yasin Khan and Meos due to his gross misrule. Initially he had limited administrative control, but was given executive authority eventually in the last days of the British Raj by the Viceroy of India in 1944.

Tej Singh was a supporter of Hindu nationalism through the Akhil Bharatiya Hindu Mahasabha, and hosted the Akhil Bharatiya Kshatriya Mahasabha, serving as its president in 1947. He opposed Mahatma Gandhi's Non-cooperation movement. There is speculation that he supported and funded the Rashtriya Swayamsevak Sangh. He appointed Dr N.B. Khare as his prime minister who failed to prevent, and some say encouraged pushing, Alwar into sectarian violence that saw Muslims forcefully converted, forced out, and in some cases murdered during the Partition of India. He was accused but found innocent of playing a role in the assassination of Mahatma Gandhi, with a claim (never upheld) that the revolver used in the assassination came from Sir Tej Singh. His association with the implicated Hindu Mahasabha and a prominent suspect at the time, Dr N.B. Khare (his Prime Minister), added to the suspicion. The issue remains controversial to this day.

Tej Singh ruled for a decade, from 1937-1947, with administrative control only granted in 1944, before the coming of Indian independence in 1947.

In 1948, possibly under pressure during the Gandhi assassination investigation, Tej Singh agreed that Alwar be merged with other Eastern Rajputana princely states to form the Matsya Union; the union merged into that of Greater Rajasthan the following year. After 1948, Sir Tej retired to his New Delhi residence, Alwar House, where he lived for the next six decades, visiting his former kingdom but rarely.

== Derecognition ==
H.H. Sir Tej Singh Bahadur was formally dispossessed of his titles in 1971 as part of the mass derecognition drive of the royal families' status. During the Indian Emergency, tax inspectors under the Indira Gandhi regime forcibly searched the Alwar palaces.

Sir Tej Singh died at his Alwar House, New Delhi residence, on 15 February 2009, a month away from his 98th birthday. He was cremated at Delhi. He was one of the last surviving princely rulers of the old British Raj and was the last living member of the Order of the Star of India. He was succeeded as Maharaja of Alwar by his grandson, Jitendra Singh, though the title no longer comes with any authority or power.

== Personal life ==
In the year 1931 while he was still part of the Thana family of Alwar State, Tej Singh married Maharaniji Sa Rathorji Shri Chand Kanwarji of Raoti in Jodhpur State (d. 1998). The couple had two sons and three daughters:

- 1.Yuvraj Pratap Singh (17 June 1938 – 27 March 1976). Killed under mysterious circumstances at Alwar during the Indian Emergency. Married on 26 April 1962 to the Princess of Bundi State Hadiji Mahendra Kumari, MP (6 February 1942 – 27 June 2002), and had one son and one daughter:
  - Bhanwar Jitendra Pratap Singh (12 June 1971-), who succeeded as HH Raj Rishi Sawai Maharaja Jitendra Pratap Singh Veerendra Shiromani Dev Bharat Prabhakar Bahadur, Maharaja of Alwar upon his grandfather's death on 15 February 2009 (see article)
  - Bhanwar Baiji Lal Minakshi Kumari.
- 2. Maharaj Kumar Yashwant Singh (19 September 1939-). Married Gohelji Brinda Kumari (1942-) Princess of Palitana State, and has one son and two daughters:
  - Baiji Lal Yogendra Singh (3 March 1959-)
  - Baiji Lal Bhuvneshwari Kumari (1960-)
  - Baiji Lal Sohini Kumari (5 January 1968-)
- 3. Maharaj Kumariji Baiji Lal Pratap Kanwarji m.into Wankaner State
- 4. Maharaj Kumariji Baiji Lal Bhan Kanwarji m.into Pratapgarh State
- 5. Maharaj Kumariji Baiji Lal Man Kanwarji m.into Rajkot State

== Titles ==
- 1911-1937: Sri Tej Singh
- 1937-1943: His Highness Raj Rishi Sri Sawai Maharaja Tej Singh Veerendra Shiromani Dev Bharat Prabhakar Bahadur, Maharaja of Alwar
- 1943-1944: His Highness Raj Rishi Sri Sawai Maharaja Sir Tej Singh Veerendra Shiromani Dev Bharat Prabhakar Bahadur, Maharaja of Alwar, KCSI
- 1944-1945: Captain His Highness Raj Rishi Sri Sawai Maharaja Sir Tej Singh Veerendra Shiromani Dev Bharat Prabhakar Bahadur, Maharaja of Alwar, KCSI
- 1945-1946: Lieutenant-Colonel His Highness Raj Rishi Sri Sawai Maharaja Sir Tej Singh Veerendra Shiromani Dev Bharat Prabhakar Bahadur, Maharaja of Alwar, KCSI
- 1946-1971: Colonel His Highness Raj Rishi Sri Sawai Maharaja Sir Tej Singh Veerendra Shiromani Dev Bharat Prabhakar Bahadur, Maharaja of Alwar, KCSI

== Honours ==
(ribbon bar, as it would look in 1950)

- King George V Silver Jubilee Medal-1935
- King George VI Coronation Medal-1937
- Knight Commander of the Order of the Star of India (KCSI)-1943
- War Medal 1939-1945-1945
- Africa Star-1945
- Italy Star-1945
- 1939-1945 Star-1945
- India Service Medal-1945
- Indian Independence Medal-1947

Preceded by Jai Singh Prabhakar Bahadur	Maharaja of Alwar; 1937 – 1971; 1971 – 2009 (titular)	Succeeded by Jitendra Singh
