= Khangarot =

The Khangarot is a Kachhwaha Rajput clan in India.
