= Bhuvneshwari Kumari =

Indian squash player (born 1960)

Bhuvneshwari Kumari (born September 1, 1960) is a former women's squash champion from India. She is a recipient of prestigious awards like Padma Shri and Arjuna Award. She is also a record holder of Guinness Book of World Records for being India's national champion 16 consecutive times. She belongs to the former royal family of Alwar.

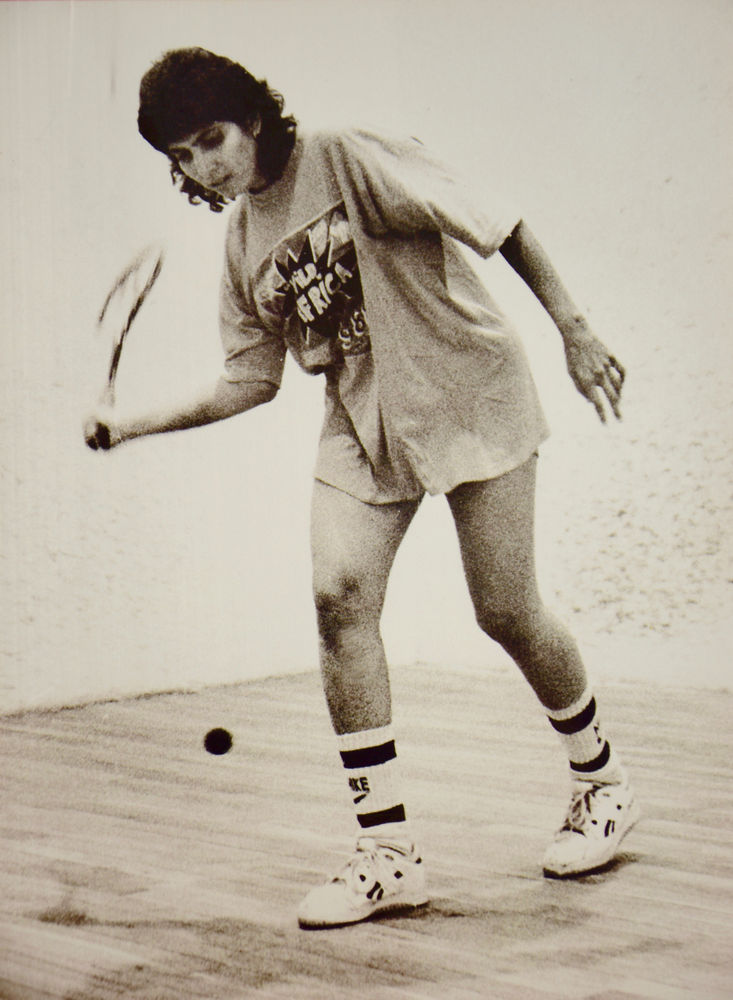
Bhuvneshwari Kumari on the squash court

== Early life ==
Kumari, also known as Princess Candy, was born at New Delhi on 1 September 1960 to Yashwant Singh and Brinda Kumari. She is the granddaughter of Maharaja Tej Singh Prabhakar Bahadur of Alwar. She has done her B.A. from St. Stephen's College of Delhi University.

== Career ==
She was Women's National Squash Champion for 16 consecutive seasons (1977-1992).

She is winner of 41 State titles and two International titles (Kenyan Open 1988 and 1989).

She was awarded the Arjuna Award in 1982 and the Padma Shri in 2001.

She is also co-Coach for the Indian Women's Squash team with Cyrus Poncha. They trained the team for Asian Games 2018 that were held in Jakarta, Indonesia.

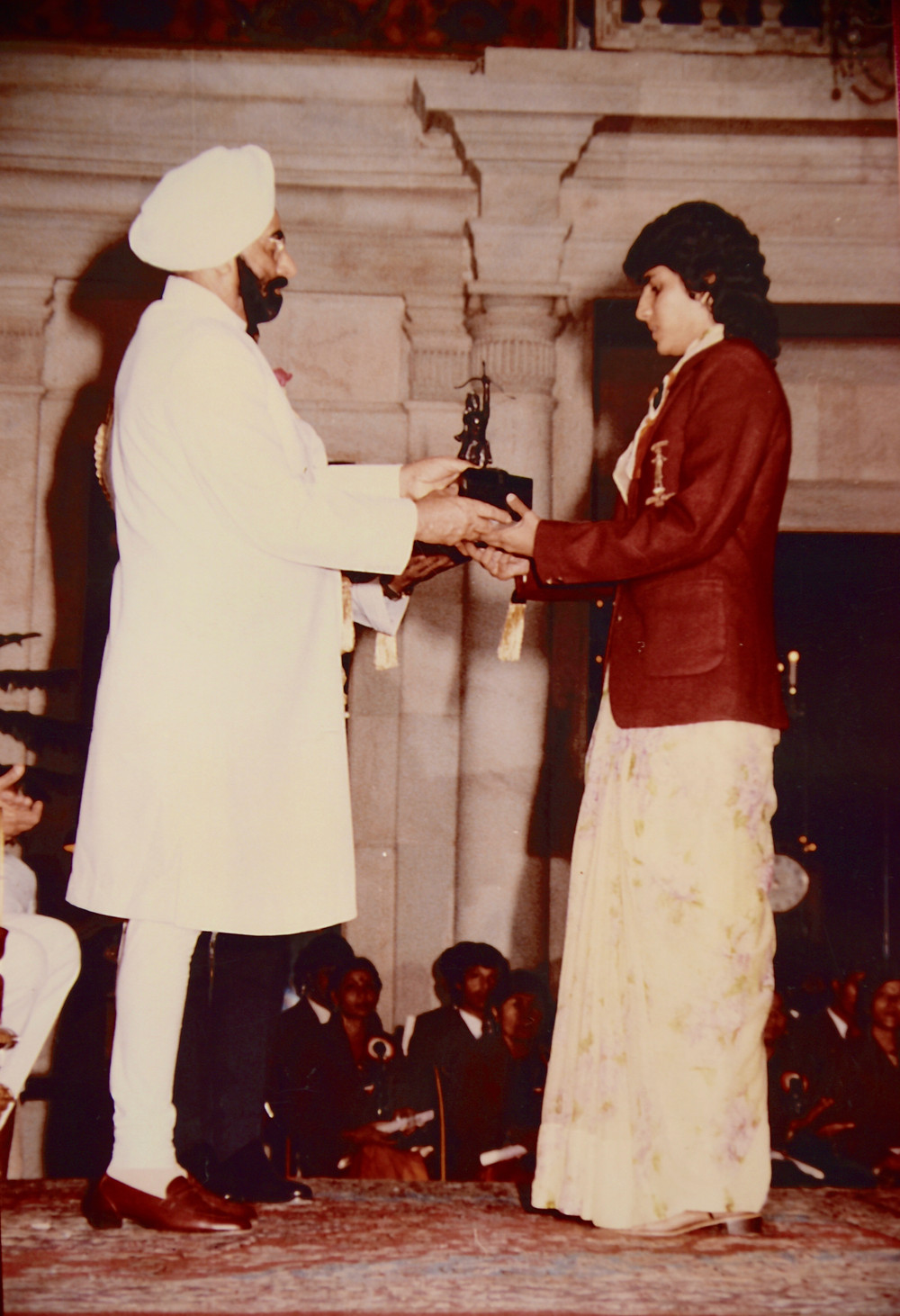
Kumari receiving her Arjuna Award (29.08.1982)

== Recognition ==
- Arjuna Award in 1982
- Padma Shri in 2001
- Delhi Sports Journalist Association Award (For The Best Sports Woman 1983)
- Rajasthan Sports Award Council 1984
- Maharana Mewar Foundation "Aravali Award" (For the most Outstanding Sportswoman of the year 1990)
- K.K. Birla Foundation Award for Sports (For Outstanding Performance in 1991)
- Bombay Sports Journalist Association Award (For Best Sportswoman for the year 1992)
- Listed in the Limca Book of Records (For Sports Person of The Year 1992 and for The Most Number of Titles Won in Indian Sports)
- Rajasthan Olympic Association Award -For Best Woman Player 1993–94
- Maharaja Sawai Madho Singh Award for excellence in sports

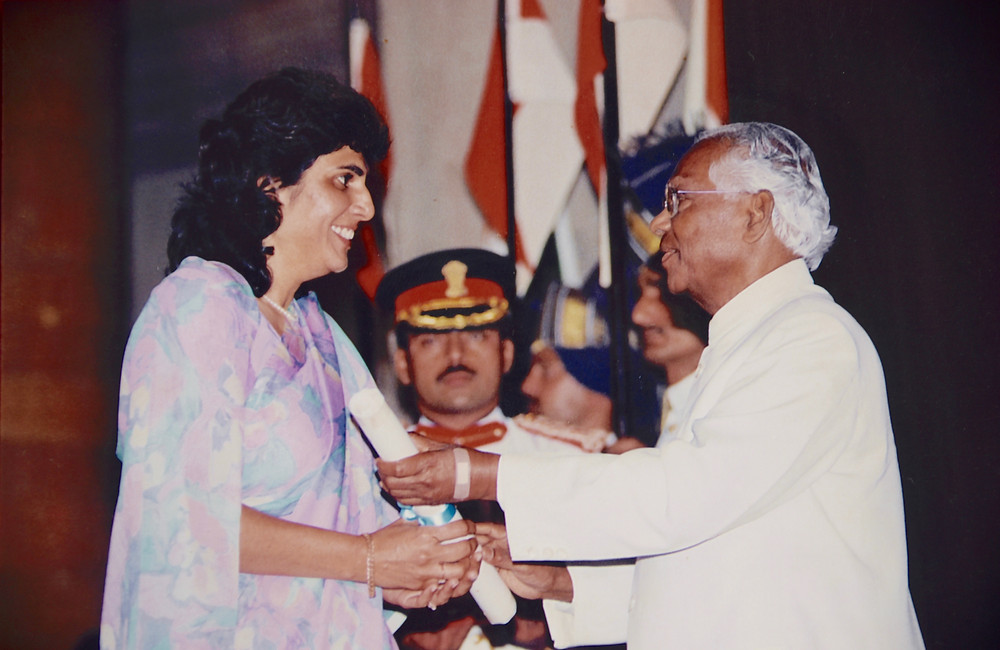
Kumari receiving her Padma Shri (25.01.2001)
