= State of Alwar =

Indian princely state (est. 1775)

State of Alwar रियासत-ए-अलवर
- Princely State of British India
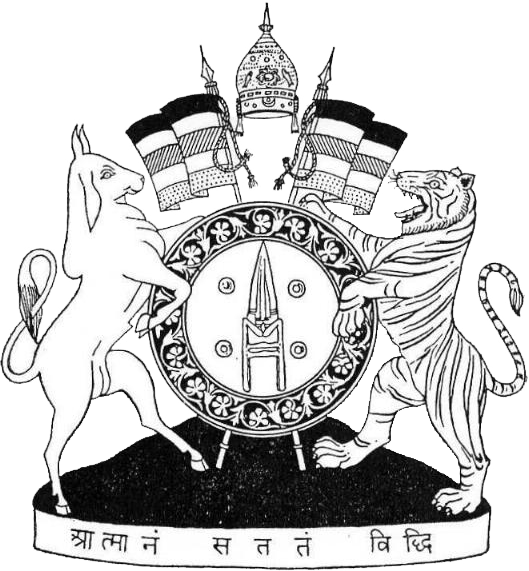
- Flag Coat of arms

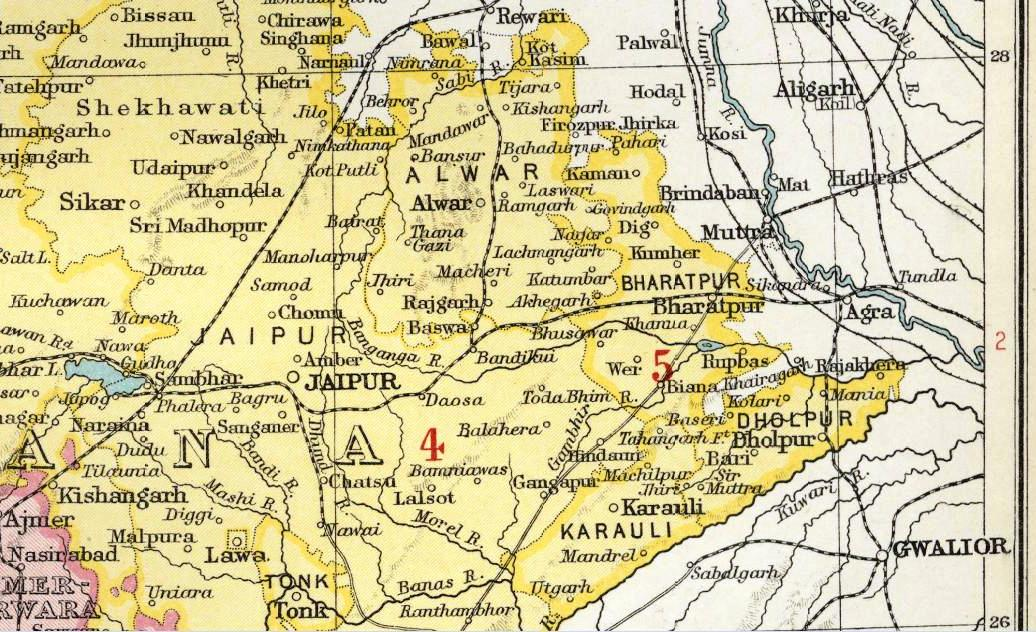
- State of Alwar, as shown in the Imperial Gazetteer of India (1909)
- Capital: Alwar
- Area
  - 1945: 8,331.992 km^{2} (3,217.000 sq mi)
- Population
  - 1941: 823,055
- History
  - Established: 1775
- Today part of: India

The State of Alwar, or Alwar State, was a princely state that was ruled by the Rajputs of the Naruka clan of the Kachhwaha dynasty.

== History ==
Bar Singh, the eldest son of Udaikaran, the Raja of Amber, took offence when his father became interested in a woman Bar Singh was meant to marry. He asked his father to marry her instead and relinquished his claim to the throne of Amber in favour of any offspring from that union. Nar Singh, the son born from that union, succeeded to the throne of Amber after Udaikaran's death, while Bar Singh received an estate of 84 villages as his appanage. Bar Singh was succeeded by his son Mairaj, who in turn was succeeded by Naru. It was after Naru that his descendants came to be known as Naruka.

Naru had five sons: Lala, Dasa, Tejsi, Jeta, and Chitar. The descendants of Lala came to be known as Lalawat, and the rulers of Alwar are descended from him. Although Lala was the eldest son of his father, he was not treated accordingly and received only Jhak and 12 villages as his patrimony. Lala received from him the title of Rao and a banner in recognition of the loyal spirit he displayed towards his chief, Bharmal. Lala's son, Udai Singh, served under Bharmal and usually led the vanguard in battle. Udai's son, Lar, was often with Man Singh I and is said to have received the title of Khan from Akbar. Lar Khan had a son, Fateh Singh, who in turn had four sons: Kalyan Singh, Karan Singh, Akhai Singh, and Ranchor Das.

Sons of Fateh Singh
- Fateh Singh
  - Kalyan Singh
  - Karan Singh
  - Akhai Singh
  - Ranchor Das

After the death of his father, Kalyan succeeded to his ancestral estate. However, when he did not support Jai Singh I against a rival, his estate was confiscated, and he was banished to Macheri. He later served at Kama, which had originally been conferred on Jai Singh I by Aurangzeb, and tried to take control of it. His attempt failed, and a son of Jai Singh I succeeded his father in Kama, forcing Kalyan to return to Macheri.

Kalyan’s son, Anand Singh, had two grandsons, Zorawar Singh and Zalim Singh, who divided Macheri between them. Zorawar, the elder, received Macheri, and from him the rulers of Alwar claim descent, while Zalim, the younger, received Bijawar in his appanage. Zorawar Singh's grandson, Pratap Singh, received an estate comprising two and a half villages and, with the permission of the Maharaja of Jaipur, built a fort at Rajgarh. In the years that followed, he constructed several forts and maintained cordial relations with Mirza Najaf Khan. When the rulers of Bharatpur failed to pay the arrears for the Alwar fort, Sawai Pratap Singh Naruka was summoned by the fort commandant to take possession of the fort, and following his acquisition, his kin began to pay homage and present him with nazars, or offerings. One Swarup Singh opposed Pratap, and when Andha Naik brought him as a prisoner before Pratap, the latter asked Swarup to present the nazar. When he failed to comply, Pratap put him to death and took possession of his estates. Pratap was granted the Mahi Maratib, and he renounced his allegiance to Jaipur. He established the State of Alwar in 1775.

=== Under the British Empire ===
In the year 1803, during the reign of Bakhtawar Singh, Alwar entered into a mutual offensive and defensive alliance of permanent friendship with the East India Company. By doing so, Alwar became the first state in Rajputana to enter into permanent treaty relations with the East India Company.

=== Accession ===
On 3 June 1947, Lord Mountbatten announced that the British would transfer power to the representatives of the Dominion of India and the Dominion of Pakistan on 15 August 1947. The princely states were given the following options: depending on their geographical location and demographic composition, they could either accede to the Dominion of India or the Dominion of Pakistan, or remain independent. Following the partition of India in 1947, Tej Singh Prabhakar acceded the Alwar State to the Dominion of India.

=== Merger ===
Alwar State was merged on 18 March 1948 with three other princely states, namely Bharatpur, Dholpur, and Karauli, to form the Matsya Union. On 15 May 1949, the Matsya Union was merged with Greater Rajasthan to create the United State of Greater Rajasthan, which later became Rajasthan.

== Geography ==
Alwar State covered an area of 3,217 square miles, with an extreme length of 80 miles and a breadth of 60 miles. Of the total area, approximately 2,627 square miles consisted of plains, while the remaining 590 square miles comprised hilly tracts.

It lay between 27° 5′–28° 10′ N and 76° 10′–77° 15′ E, and was bounded on the north by Gurgaon, Bawal of Nabha State, and Kotkasim of Jaipur State; on the east by Bharatpur State and Gurgaon; on the south by Jaipur; and on the west by Nabha State, Patiala State, and Jaipur State.

== Composition ==
For administrative purposes, the Alwar State was divided into ten nizamats, or administrative sub-areas, which were distributed between the Northern District and the Southern District. The Northern District consisted of the following nizamats: Alwar, Behror, Mandawar, Kishangarh, and Tijara. The Southern District consisted of the following nizamats: Ramgarh, Lachhmangarh, Rajgarh, Thanagazi, and Bansur.

No,	Name of District	Name of Nizamat	Principal Towns	Number of villages	Reference
1	Northern District	Alwar	Alwar	249	
1	Northern District	Alwar	Malakhera	249	
1	Northern District	Behror	Behror	152	
1	Northern District	Behror	Mandhan	152	
1	Northern District	Behror	Barrod	152	
1	Northern District	Mandawar	Mandawar	133	
1	Northern District	Mandawar	Ajarka	133	
1	Northern District	Kishangarh	Kishangarh	167	
1	Northern District	Kishangarh	Harsauli	167	
1	Northern District	Kishangarh	Khairthal	167	
1	Northern District	Tijara	Tijara	208	
1	Northern District	Tijara	Tapukara	208	
2	Southern District	Ramgarh	Ramgarh	175	
2	Southern District	Ramgarh	Govindgarh	175	
2	Southern District	Lachhmangarh	Lachhmangarh	259	
2	Southern District	Lachhmangarh	Kathumar	259	
2	Southern District	Lachhmangarh	Kherli	259	
2	Southern District	Rajgarh	Rajgarh	239	
2	Southern District	Rajgarh	Tehla	239	
2	Southern District	Thanagazi	Thanagazi	175	
2	Southern District	Thanagazi	Pratapgarh	175	
2	Southern District	Bansur	Bansur	101	
2	Southern District	Bansur	Narayan Pur	101	
Total number of villages				1858	

== Population ==
According to the 1941 census, the population of Alwar was 823,055.

Population of Alwar in 1941										Reference
Hindus			Muslims			Christians			Grand Total	Reference
Males	Females	Total	Males	Females	Total	Males	Females	Total	Grand Total	Reference
3,17,530	2,85,052	6,02,582	1,17,828	1,02,507	2,20,335	53	85	138	8,23,05	
(Include Sikhs)			1,17,828	1,02,507	2,20,335	53	85	138	8,23,05	

== Forces ==
Alwar had one Lancer regiment, the Mangal Lancers, and two infantry battalions, namely, the Alwar Jey Paltan, and the Alwar Pratap Paltan. The Mangal Lancers, the Alwar Jey Paltan, and the Alwar Pratap Paltan continued in the Class-A (Note: Class-A referred to troops that were organised according to the Indian Army system and establishment and, with some exceptions, were armed with the same weapons as the corresponding units of the regular Indian Army.) category of the Indian States Forces up to October, 1939.

Expenditure on the maintenance of the State's Forces (All figures are in Rupees)
Sr.	Item	Financial Year						References
Sr.	Item	1938–39	1939–40	1940–41	1942–43	1943–44	1944–45	References
1	Establishment	355563	364096	257743	745927	824487	811708	
2	Ammunition and Equipment	24961	24933	22040	10,890	15677	14147	
3	Other contingent expenditure	72361	59322	160104	1,05,511	122567	128221	
4	Extra grant for replacement of equipment			9978				
5	Emergency Commissioned Officers			1960				
Total		452885	448351	451825	862328	962731	954076	

=== Mangal Lancers ===
This unit was raised in Alwar in 1884. It was reorganised as Imperial Service Troops in 1884 and as Indian States Forces in 1922. Its officers wore red uniforms with blue facings. It was composed of both Rajputs and Muslims.

=== Alwar Jey Paltan ===
This unit, originally known as Fateh Paltan, was raised in 1825. It was reorganised as Imperial Service Troops in 1888 and as Indian States Forces in 1922. Its officers wore scarlet uniforms with white facings.

During the Indian Rebellion of 1857, it assisted the East India Company in quelling the insurgents at Bharatpur. It later took part in the Boxer Rebellion. During World War I, it served in Egypt and Palestine, and during World War II, in the Middle East.

=== Alwar Pratap Paltan ===
This unit was raised after World War I, at Alwar, in 1919, by Jai Singh Prabhakar. It was reorganised as the Indian States Forces in 1922.

== Rulers ==
The rulers of Alwar belong to the Naruka branch of the Kachhwaha clan of the Rajputs. Like the royal house of Jaipur, the royal house of Alwar claims descent from Kush, the eldest son of Rama of Ayodhya. The ancestors of the family eventually settled in Amber, from where the house later divided into two branches: Alwar and Jaipur. Alwar represented the senior branch of Amber. The ruler of the state was entitled to a permanent gun salute of 15.

No.	Name	Portrait	Reign	Notes	References
Rao Raja					
1	Pratap Singh		c. 1775 – c. 1791		
2	Bakhtawar Singh		c. 1791 – c. 1815		
3	Vinay Singh		c. 1815 – c. 1857		
Maharao Raja
4	Shivdan Singh		c. 1857 – 11 October 1874		
5	Mangal Singh		11 October 1874 – 22 May 1893		
Maharaja
6	Jai Singh		22 May 1893 – 20 May 1937		
7	Tej Singh		20 May 1937 – 15 February 2009		
Pretender
8	Jitendra Singh		15 February 2009 – present		

=== Titles and styles ===
The ruler of Alwar bore the title Raj Rishi Shri Sawai Maharaja (personal name) Singhji Veerendra Shiromani Dev Bharat Prabhakar Bahadur, Maharaja of Alwar, with the style of His Highness.

== Bara Kotri ==
Bara Kotri, meaning the twelve fiefs or houses, was a term Alwar took from its parent state, Jaipur. It referred to the families closely related to the ruler of Alwar on his paternal side. Rao Kalyan Singh had five sons, and those sons established five families, collectively known as the panch thikanas or five fiefs, while the offshoots of these families are referred to as bara kotri. In all, 25 families belong to this class. Succession in these families followed the rule of primogeniture, and suitable provisions were made for the younger sons out of the income of the estates.

Sons of Kalyan Singh
- Kalyan Singh
  - Anand Singh
  - Shyam Singh
  - Jodh Singh
  - Amar Singh
  - Ishri Singh

Panch Thikanas	No.	Name	Founder	Notes	Reference
Panch Thikanas	1	Macheri	Anand Singh		
Panch Thikanas	2	Para	Shyam Singh		
Panch Thikanas	3	Pai	Jodh Singh		
Panch Thikanas	4	Khora	Amar Singh		
Panch Thikanas	5	Palwa	Ishri Singh		

They were hereditary nobles of Alwar and would, in durbar, take their seats to the right of the ruler. In times when there was no heir to succeed in Alwar, they also decided collectively who should become the new ruler.
