= Rajgarh, Alwar =

Rajgarh
- Town
- Location in Rajasthan, India Rajgarh (India)
- Coordinates: 27.236°N 76.622°E
- Country: India
- State: Rajasthan
- District: Alwar
- Elevation: 479 m (1,572 ft)

Population (2011)
  - Total: 26,631

Languages
  - Official: Hindi
- Time zone: UTC+5:30 (IST)
- Postal code: 301408
- Vehicle registration: RJ 02

Rajgarh is a town and a tehsil in Alwar district in the Indian state of Rajasthan. Bhangarh, Asia's most haunted place, is also present in Rajgarh, Alwar tehsil. It is a small town set in scenic hills dotted with forts, and features waterfalls, a valley, and the hills of Aravalli. There is a railway station in Rajgarh itself, and just 25 km away from Rajgarh is Bandikui Junction, an important railway junction of Rajasthan.

== History ==
Rajgarh is a small town on State Highway 25, close to Sariska National Park, in Alwar district of Rajasthan. It lies on the main train route between Delhi and Jaipur. Rajgarh Fort was built by Raja Pratap Singh Naruka, the founder of the State of Alwar who is often referred to as the "Bismarck of Alwar". In 1771, Rajgarh Fort was the site of the old capital of Alwar state. Later the new capital was set up at Bala Kila, Alwar and Rajgarh was turned into the summer residence of the Alwar Royal family. Rajgarh boasts of the famous Baghraj Temple, a Step Well, historic fort, palaces and a bustling market. A 19th century British traveler described Rajgarh valley as "A Perfect Earthly Paradise" with the walls of the well-kept fort of Rajgarh, picturesquely perched on a hill rising out of a green and fertile. Mostly 80% population in Rajgarh is Meena

Rajgarh has the tomb of the father of famous Urdu Poet Mirza Ghalib within town limits. Rajgarh Tehsil also contains the historic town of Rajore, now called Rajorgarh, where an inscription was found of Maharadhiraj Parmeshwara Matthandeva of Gurjara-Pratihara lineage, dated to 960 AD. Rajgarh is the birthplace of freedom fighter Bhawani Sahai Sharma who was a senior member of Hindustan Socialist Republican Army. He served a jail term of more than 9 years at the hand of the British during the Indian Independence struggle. Bhawani Sahai Sharma later became an MLA from Thana Gazi, Alwar.

== Geography and attractions ==
Rajgarh has an average elevation of 479 metres (1571 feet). It is a major agricultural centre with a RIICO rajasthan mineral industrial park.

Famous and Attractive places of Rajgarh are as follows.

1. Bhangarh
2. Kala daata
3. Alewa waterfall
4. Govind Dev Ji Temple
5. jagganath ji temple
6. Rajgarh Fort
7. jharna
8. The Haunted 7 chauk ki haweeli
9. The temple of Bairuji in Ratanpura Village
10. Baghraj Temple
11. Machari(Machadi) Birth Place -Raja Hemchandra Vikramaditya..
12. Ajabgarh
13. sarsa mata mandir
14. Narayani mata Mandir
15. Naga Baba Ka mandir Dhigawara
16. Bhartari Baba Tapostali

== Educational Institutions ==
Rajgarh has an early college of the British era, Rajgarh PG college, which provides up to post graduate level education. Another college is Government college of Agriculture Machari. In Rajgarh for early and sr. Sec education before Independence Two schools established First one is Govt. Girls school Rajgarh near Old police station, and second is PyareLal Gupta sr. Sec. School near Mahal bagh machari road Rajgarh. Now This school Name renamed as PM Shree Pyarelal Gupta Rajgarh. Near this School is a prestigious ground known as Pratap Stadium Rajgarh. It hosts many games like block, district and State games.
