= Kachhwaha =

Clan of Rajputs in India

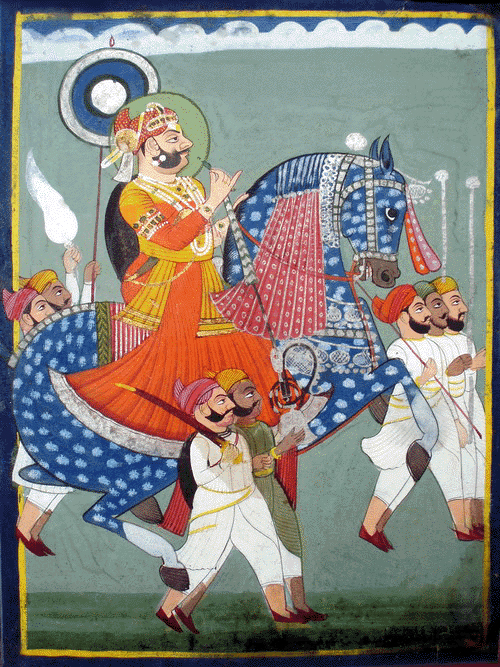
Painting depicting Raja Man Singh Kacchwaha

The Kachhwaha is a Rajput clan found primarily in India. They claim to be descendants of Kusha, hence from the Suryavanshi (Solar) dynasty. The Kachhwahas ruled the Kingdom of Amber in present-day Rajasthan, India.

== Etymology ==
According to Cynthia Talbot, Kachhwaha is a Sanskrit word which means tortoise. According to other sources, the clan name ‘Kacchwaha’ has been derived from the name of Kusha, Rama’s son, so they also claim descent from Rama’s son Kusha and thus from the Suryavanshi lineage.

== Origin ==
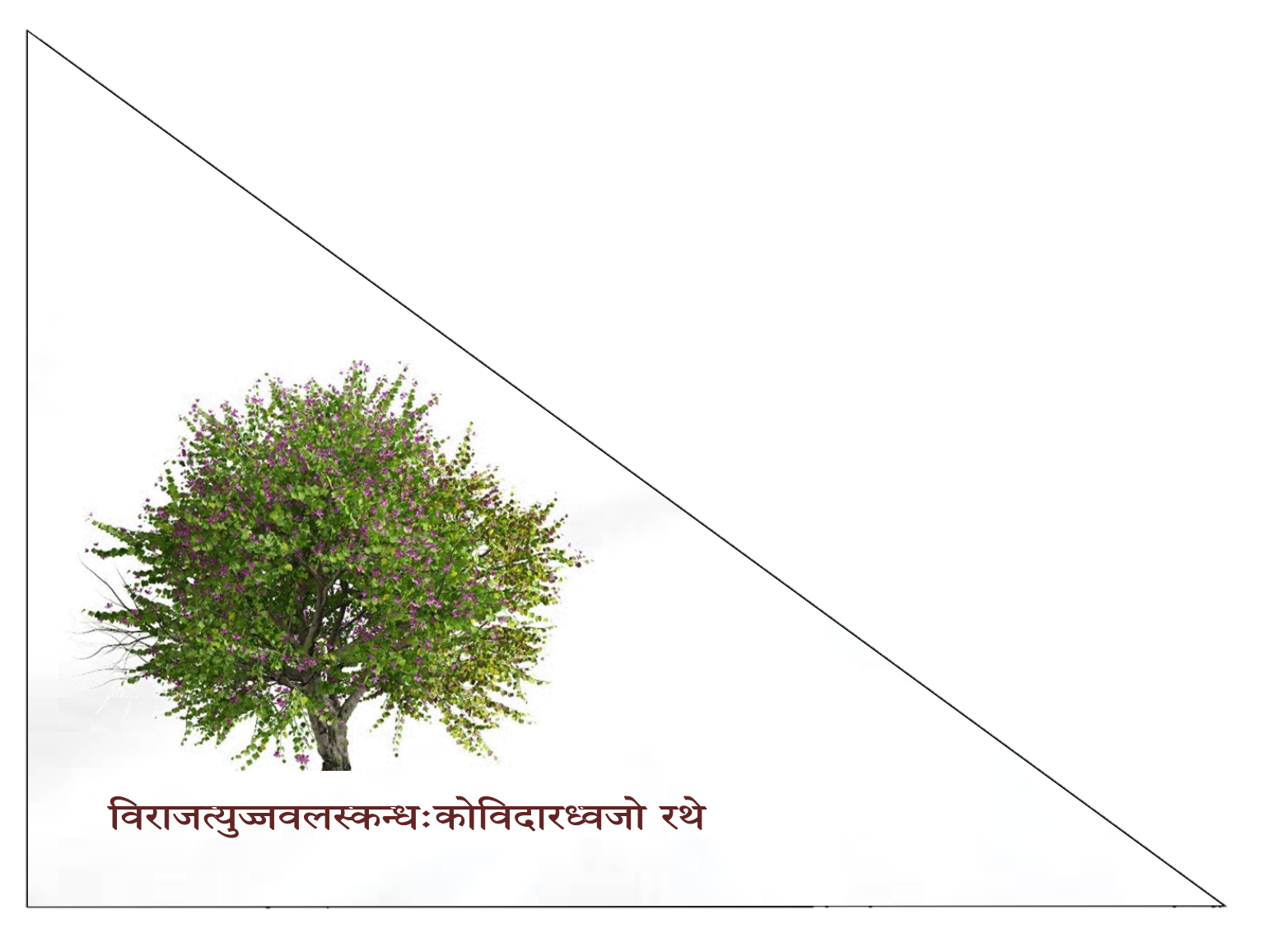
Original Jharshahi Flag (Kovidar/kachnar dhvaj)

The Kacchwahas claim descent from Kusha, son of the Hindu God Rama{{. According to James Mills, the ancestors of Kacchwaha Rajputs had migrated from Kosala and established a new dynasty at Gwalior and later migrated to Rajasthan in 1028 AD. Some historians associate Dulha Rao, the founder of the Jaipur-Kachhwaha lineage, with the Kachchhapaghata dynasty of 10th century.

According to Rima Hooja, the Kachhwahas were initially referred to by names such as Kachhapaghata, Kachwaha and Katsawaha. The variant Kachawa became popular in the late 16th century during the reign of Raja Man Singh, a Mughal Subahdar of Bihar Subah (1587-1594), and of Bengal Subah (1595-1606. Several inscriptions and manuscripts, such as those found in Balvan, Chatsu, Sanganer and Rewasa are cited in support of this theory.

.

== Sub-Clans ==
There are approximately 71 subclans of the Kachhwahas. The prominent ones are:

- Rajawat - The Rajawats hold the right of succession to the Jaipur throne, and the Maharaja of Jaipur belongs to this subclan.
- Shekhawat - Descendants of Rao shekha.
- Naruka - Descendants of Rao Naru .
- Nathawat - Descendants of rao natha.
- Khangarot- Descendants of Rao khangar.

== Notable people ==
=== Khoh Kingdom ===
- Dulha Rai
- Kakil

=== Amber Kingdom ===
- Pajawan
- Prithviraj Singh I
- Bharmal
- Bhagwant Das
- Man Singh I
- Mirza Raja Jai Singh I

=== Jaipur State ===
- Maharaja Sawai Jai Singh II
- Maharaja Ram Singh I
- Maharaja Sawai Madho Singh I
- Maharaja Sawai Pratap Singh
- Maharaja Sawai Man Singh II
- Maharani Gayatri Devi
- Maharaja Sawai Bhawani Singh
- Princess Diya Kumari
- Maharaja Padmanabh Singh

=== Alwar State ===
- Rao Raja Pratap Singh
- Colonel HH Raj Rishi Shri Sawai Maharaja Sir Jai Singh
- HH Raj Rishi Shri Sawai Maharaja Jitendra Singh
- Rajkumari Bhuvneshwari Kumari

=== Kohra Estate ===
- Babu Himmat Sah
- Babu Bhoop Singh

=== Amethi Estate ===
- Raja Lal Madho Singh
- Raja Bhagwan Baksh Singh
- Raja Sanjaya Sinh

=== Shekhawati Region ===
- Rao Shekha of amarsar
- Ajit Singh of Khetri

== See also ==
•Rajput clans

•Rajputana
