= Naruka =

Rajput clan

Naruka नरुका
- Rajput clan
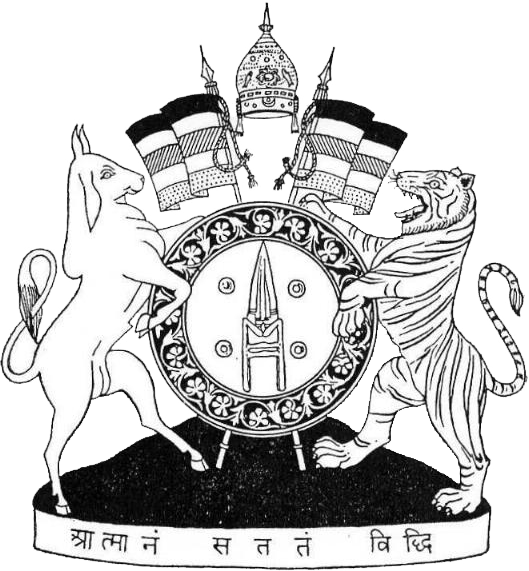
- Coat of arms
- Parent house: Kachhwaha
- Country: Narukas of Alwar; Macheri; Lawa Thikana; Uniara Jagir
- Current region: Rajasthan (Alwar, Jaipur, Dausa)
- Founded: 16th century CE
- Founder: Rao Naru Singh
- Titles: Maharaja, Rao, Thakur
- Traditions: Hinduism (Vaishnavism, Shaivism)

The Naruka is a Rajput clan found in the Indian state of Rajasthan. It is a prominent Sub-Clan of Kachhwaha dynasty of Rajputs. The clan traces its origin to Rao Naru Singh, a descendant of the rulers of Kingdom of Amber (modern-day Jaipur).

== History ==
Naruka Rajputs are offshoots of Maharao Naru Singh of Mojad (now called Mozamabad), a Rajput warrior from 15th century Dhundhad region. He was great-grandson of Raja Udaykaran of Amer who reigned 1366-1388 AD.

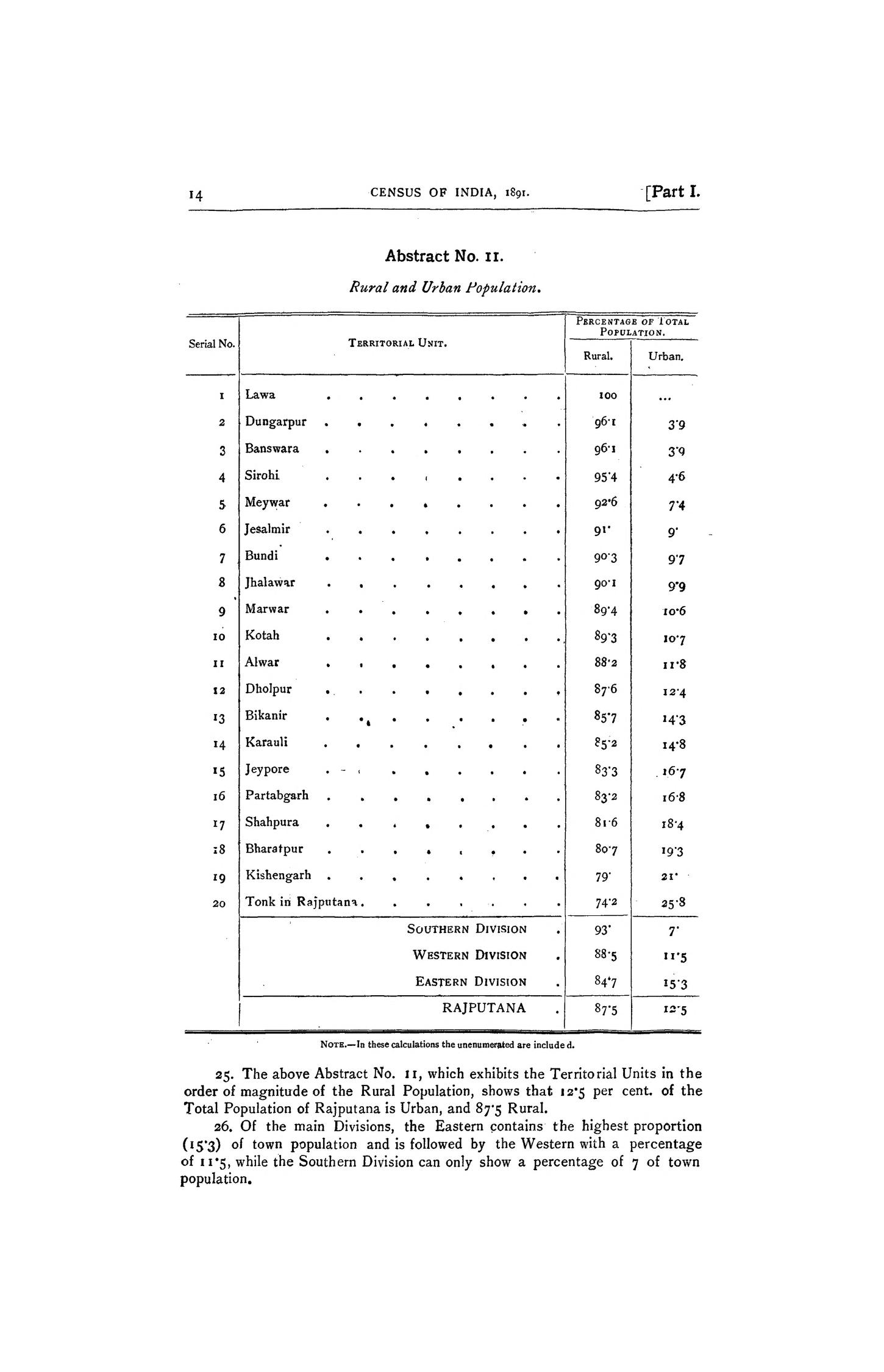
Census of India (1891), showing the independent states of Rajputana Agency in colonial times

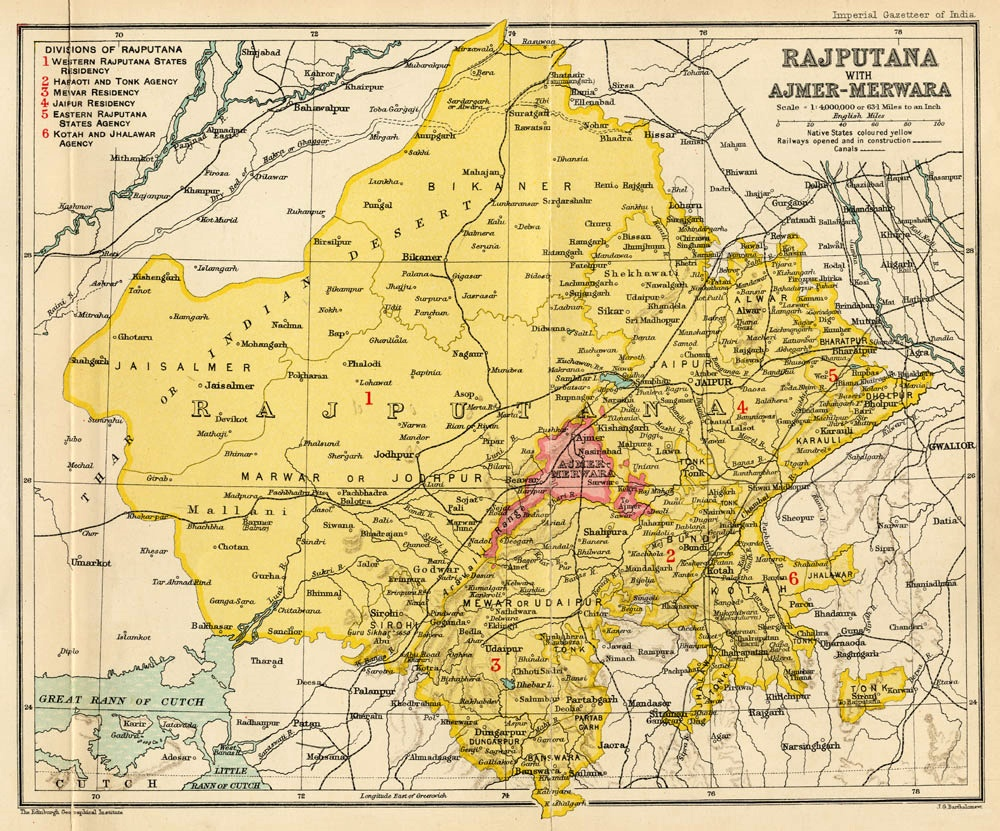
Map of modern-day Indian state of Rajasthan in 1909 AD

At the time of Indian Independence, Rajasthan included 19 princely states (including Alwar), 3 chiefships (Lawa, Neemrana and Kushalgarh) and 1 centrally-administered territory of Ajmer-Merwara. Among these total 23 territories, 3 were ruled by Kachhwaha dynasty - Jaipur, Alwar and Lawa.

Naru Singh had several issues which included - Dasa, Lala, Teja, Jeta and Chitar.

The territories of which Naruka Rajputs kept hold were collectively called Narukhand. In initial history of the clan it is mentioned as territories centered around Mojad (Mozamabad) but later history defines it as a region which was part of the former princely state of Alwar.

== See also ==
- Rajput clans
- Shekhawat
