= List of by-elections to the Rajasthan Legislative Assembly =

The following is a list of by-elections held for the Rajasthan Legislative Assembly, India, since its formation in 1956.

== 14th Assembly ==
=== 2014 ===
S.No	Date	Constituency	MLA before election	Party before election	Elected MLA	Party after election
1	13 September 2014	Nasirabad	Sanwar Lal Jat	Bharatiya Janata Party	Ramnaryan	Indian National Congress
2	13 September 2014	Surajgarh	Santosh Ahlawat	Bharatiya Janata Party	Sharwan Kumar	Indian National Congress
3	13 September 2014	Weir	Bahadur Singh Koli	Bharatiya Janata Party	Bhajan Lal Jatav	Indian National Congress
4	13 September 2014	Kota South	Om Birla	Bharatiya Janata Party	Sandeep Sharma	Bharatiya Janata Party

=== 2017 ===
S.No	Date	Constituency	MLA before election	Party before election	Elected MLA	Party after election
79	9 April 2017	Dholpur	B.L. Kushwah	Bahujan Samaj Party	Shobha Rani Kushwah	Bharatiya Janata Party

=== 2018 ===
S.No	Date	Constituency	MLA before election	Party before election	Elected MLA	Party after election
1	29 January 2018	Mandalgarh	Kirti Kumari	Bharatiya Janata Party	Vivek Dhakar	Indian National Congress

== 15th Assembly ==
=== 2019 ===
S.No	Date	Constituency	MLA before election	Party before election	Elected MLA	Party after election
1	21 October 2019	Mandawa	Narendra Kumar	Bharatiya Janata Party	Rita Choudhary	Indian National Congress
2	21 October 2019	Khinwsar	Hanuman Beniwal	Rashtriya Loktantrik Party	Narayan Beniwal	Rashtriya Loktantrik Party

=== 2021 ===
S.No	Date	Constituency	MLA before election	Party before election	Elected MLA	Party after election
24	17 April 2021	Sujangarh	Bhanwarlal Meghwal	Indian National Congress	Manoj Meghwal	Indian National Congress
175	17 April 2021	Rajsamand	Kiran Maheshwari	Bharatiya Janata Party	Deepti Maheshwari	Bharatiya Janata Party
179	17 April 2021	Sahara	Kailash Chandra Trivedi	Indian National Congress	Gayatri Devi Trivedi	Indian National Congress
155	30 October 2021	Vallabhnagar	Gajendra Singh Shaktawat	Indian National Congress	Preeti Shaktawat	Indian National Congress
157	30 October 2021	Dhariawad	Gautam Lal Meena	Bharatiya Janata Party	Nagraj Meena	Indian National Congress

=== 2022 ===
Date	S.No	Constituency	MLA before election	Party before election	Elected MLA	Party after election
5 December 2022	21	Sardarshahar	Bhanwar Lal Sharma	Indian National Congress	Anil Kumar Sharma	Indian National Congress

== 16th Assembly ==
=== 2024 ===
Date	Constituency		Previous MLA		Reason	Elected MLA	
26 April 2024	165	Bagidora	Mahendrajeet Singh Malviya	Indian National Congress	Resigned on 19 February 2024	Jaikrishn Patel	Bharat Adivasi Party
13 November 2024	27	Jhunjhunu	Brijendra Singh Ola	Indian National Congress	Elected to Lok Sabha on 4 June 2024	Rajendra Bhamboo	Bharatiya Janata Party
13 November 2024	67	Ramgarh	Zubair Khan	Indian National Congress	Died on 14 September 2024	Sukhavant Singh	Bharatiya Janata Party
13 November 2024	88	Dausa	Murari Lal Meena	Indian National Congress	Elected to Lok Sabha on 4 June 2024	Deen Dayal Bairwa	Indian National Congress
13 November 2024	97	Deoli-Uniara	Harish Chandra Meena	Indian National Congress	Elected to Lok Sabha on 4 June 2024	Rajendra Gurjar	Bharatiya Janata Party
13 November 2024	110	Khinwsar	Hanuman Beniwal	Rashtriya Loktantrik Party	Elected to Lok Sabha on 4 June 2024	Rewant Ram Danga	Bharatiya Janata Party
13 November 2024	156	Salumber	Amrit Lal Meena	Bharatiya Janata Party	Died on 8 August 2024	Shanta Amrit Lal Meena	Bharatiya Janata Party
13 November 2024	161	Chorasi	Rajkumar Roat	Bharat Adivasi Party	Elected to Lok Sabha on 4 June 2024	Anil Kumar Katara	Bharat Adivasi Party

=== 2025 ===
Date	Constituency		Previous MLA		Reason	Elected MLA	
11 November 2025	193	Anta	Kanwar Lal Meena	Bharatiya Janata Party	Disqualified on 23 May 2025	Pramod Jain Bhaya	Indian National Congress
