= Vallabhnagar Assembly constituency =

Legislative Assembly constituency in Rajasthan State, India

Coordinates: 24.67°N 74.01°E

Vallabhnagar
- Constituency No. 155 for the Rajasthan Legislative Assembly

Constituency details
- Country: India
- Region: North India
- State: Rajasthan
- District: Udaipur
- Lok Sabha constituency: Chittorgarh
- Established: 1951
- Total electors: 264,780
- Reservation: None

Member of Legislative Assembly
- 16th Rajasthan Legislative Assembly
- Incumbent Udailal Dangi
- Party: Bhartiya Janata Party
- Elected year: 2023

Vallabhnagar Assembly constituency is one of the 200 Legislative Assembly constituencies of Rajasthan state in India.

It is part of Udaipur district.

== Member of the Legislative Assembly ==
Year	Member	Party
1957	Gulab Singh Shaktawat	Indian National Congress
1962	Har Prasad	Indian National Congress
1967	Gulab Singh Shaktawat	Indian National Congress
1972	Gulab Singh	Indian National Congress
1977	Kamlendra Singh	Janata Party
1980	Kamlendra Singh	Janata Party
1985	Gulab Singh Shaktawat	Indian National Congress
1990	Kamlender Singh	Janata Dal
1993	Gulab Singh Shaktawat	Indian National Congress
1998	Gulab Singh Shaktawat	Indian National Congress
2003	M. Randhir Singh Bhinder	Bharatiya Janata Party
2008	Gajendra Singh Shaktawat	Indian National Congress
2013	M. Randhir Singh Bhinder	Independent politician
2018	Gajendra Singh Shaktawat	Indian National Congress
2021 (Note: by-poll)	Preeti Singh Shaktawat	Indian National Congress
2023	Udailal Dangi	Bharatiya Janata Party

== Election results ==
=== 2023 ===
2023 Rajasthan Legislative Assembly election: Vallabhnagar
Party	Candidate	Votes	%	±%
BJP	Udailal Dangi	83,227	40.82	+16.0
INC	Preeti Gajendra Singh Shaktawat	63,167	30.98	−4.28
JSR	Ra. Deependra Kunwar Bhindar	47,032	23.07	
BAP	Sukhsampat Bagdi Meena	3,387	1.66	
BSP	Suresh Kumar Meghwal	1,849	0.91	−0.35
NOTA	None of the above	2,209	1.08	−0.42
Majority		20,060	9.84	+7.86
Turnout		203,903	77.01	+0.75
BJP gain from INC		Swing		

=== 2021 ===
Bye-election, 2021: Vallabhnagar
Party	Candidate	Votes	%	±%
INC	Preeti Gajendra Singh Shaktawat	65,713	35.90	+0.64
RLP	Udailal Dangi	45,107	24.65	new
Independent	M. Randhir Singh Bhindar	43,817	23.94	−9.34
BJP	Himmat Singh Jhala	21,433	11.71	−13.11
Margin of victory		20,606		
Turnout		1,83,132	72.12	
INC hold		Swing		

=== 2018 ===
2018 Rajasthan Legislative Assembly election: Vallabhnagar
Party	Candidate	Votes	%	±%
INC	Gajendra Singh Shaktawat	66,306	35.26	
anta Sena Rajasthan	M. Randhir Singh Bhinder	62,587	33.28	
BJP	Udai Lal Dangi	46,667	24.82	
Independent	Babaru Meena	4,538	2.41	
BSP	Mukesh	2,366	1.26	
NOTA	None of the above	2,813	1.5	
Majority		3,719	1.98	
Turnout		188,049	76.26	
INC gain from Independent		Swing		

=== 2013 ===
2013 Rajasthan Legislative Assembly election: Vallabhnagar
Party	Candidate	Votes	%	±%
Independent	M Randhir Singh Bhinder	74,899	42.98	
INC	Gajendra Singh Shaktawat	61,732	35.42	
BJP	Ganpat Lal Menaria	21,579	12.38	
NPP	Bhanwarlal Rawat	8,297	4.76	
Majority		13,167	7.77	
Turnout		1,74,285	78.55	
Independent gain from INC		Swing		

=== 2008 ===
2008 Rajasthan Legislative Assembly election: Vallabhnagar
Party	Candidate	Votes	%	±%
INC	Gajendra Singh Shaktawat	59,995	42.81	
BJP	M. RANDHEER SINGH BHINDAR	53335	38.06	
Independent	GANPAT LAL MENARIYA	12757	9.10	
Independent	BABAROO LAL	5027	3.59	
BSP	MANISHAKAR VYAS	3247	2.32	
LJP	BHERA	2392	1.71	
Independent	ISHAK MOHAMMAD	1277	0.91	
Loktantrik Samajwadi Party	MOHAN SINGH RAWAT	1093	0.78	
Bharatiya Jan Shakti	RAM SINGH	1028	0.73	
Margin of victory		6660	4.75	
Turnout		140151	68.73	
INC win				
INC gain from BJP		Swing		

=== 2003 ===
2003 Rajasthan Legislative Assembly election: Vallabhnagar
Party	Candidate	Votes	%	±%
BJP	M. RANDHEER SINGH BHINDAR	73,612	62.03	
INC	GULAB SINGH	41511	34.98	
NCP	RAM SINGH	3545	2.99	
Margin of victory		32101	27.05	
Turnout		118668	76.57	
BJP win				

== See also ==
- List of constituencies of the Rajasthan Legislative Assembly
- Udaipur district
