= Nathuram Mirdha =

Indian politician

Member of the Rajasthan Legislative Assembly
- In office 1952–1967 and 1985–1990
- Succeeded by: Ram Karan
- Constituency: Merta Assembly constituency

Member of the Lok Sabha
- In office 1971–1997
- Succeeded by: Bhanu Prakash Mirdha
- Constituency: Nagaur

Personal details
- Born: 20 October 1921 Kuchera, Nagaur, Rajasthan
- Died: 30 August 1996 (aged 74)
- Party: Indian National Congress
- Spouse: Kesar devi
- Education: Lucknow University
- Profession: Politician, freedom fighter, social reformer

Nathuram Mirdha (20 October 1921 – 30 August 1996) was an Indian politician, freedom fighter, social reformer and popular farmer leader from Marwar region in Rajasthan. He was elected as member of Lok Sabha for six terms between 1971 and 1997 from Nagaur. He served as member of Rajasthan Legislative Assembly. He was a popular face of Jat Politics in Rajasthan. He is also Known as Gandhi of Rajasthan. He served in the Union Council of Ministers in 1979–80 and 1989–90. He was Chairman of Maharaja Suraj Mal Institute, New Delhi for ten years.

== Education ==
Mirdha passed his matriculation from Darbar High School, Jodhpur. He earned an M.A. (Economics) and completed an LLB degree in 1944 from Lucknow University.

== Farmer leader ==
Mirdha organised a massive farmer gathering at Jodhpur under the Chairmanship of Chhotu Ram. He joined the Institution of farmers "Kisan Sabha" founded by Baldev Ram Mirdha as Secretary in 1946. He was made the Revenue minister in the Jodhpur state. Nathuram Mirdha had an intimate association with Justice Kan Singh Parihar.

== Freedom fighter and political leader ==
On 15 August 1947, with the independence of India, a popular Ministry was installed in Jodhpur. Recognising the importance of the Kisan Sabha, Mirdha, as its general secretary, was included in the Ministry. He won his first assembly election in 1952 from Merta assembly constituency with a huge majority. He was a Member of the Rajasthan Legislative Assembly from 1952 to 1967 and 1984 to 1989 and held several important portfolios in the Government of Rajasthan. He is known for strengthening agriculture and cooperative sectors in Rajasthan. Commencing from 1972, he was returned to the Lok Sabha six times. He served in the Union Council of Ministers in 1979–80 and 1989–90. He served also as the Chairman of the National Agricultural Prices Commission.

== Chairman of National Agricultural Prices Commission ==
As Chairman of National Agricultural Prices Commission, he implemented a number of schemes in the interest of farmers.

He was Chairman of Maharaja Suraj Mal Institute, New Delhi for ten years.

== Family ==
He was married to Kesar Devi in 1936 and they had two sons and two daughters.

- His younger son Bhanu Prakash Mirdha was elected to the Lok Sabha in 1996. – Senior Farmer's Leader Rajasthan
- Manish Mirdha – Grandson of Nathuram Mirdha- Young Congress leader Nagaur
- Jyoti Mirdha – Granddaughter of Nathuram Mirdha- Young Congress leader and she was MP from Nagaur in 15th Loksabha

Nathuram Mirdha died on 30 August 1996 in New Delhi, aged 75.
