= Hanuman Beniwal =

Indian politician (born 1972)

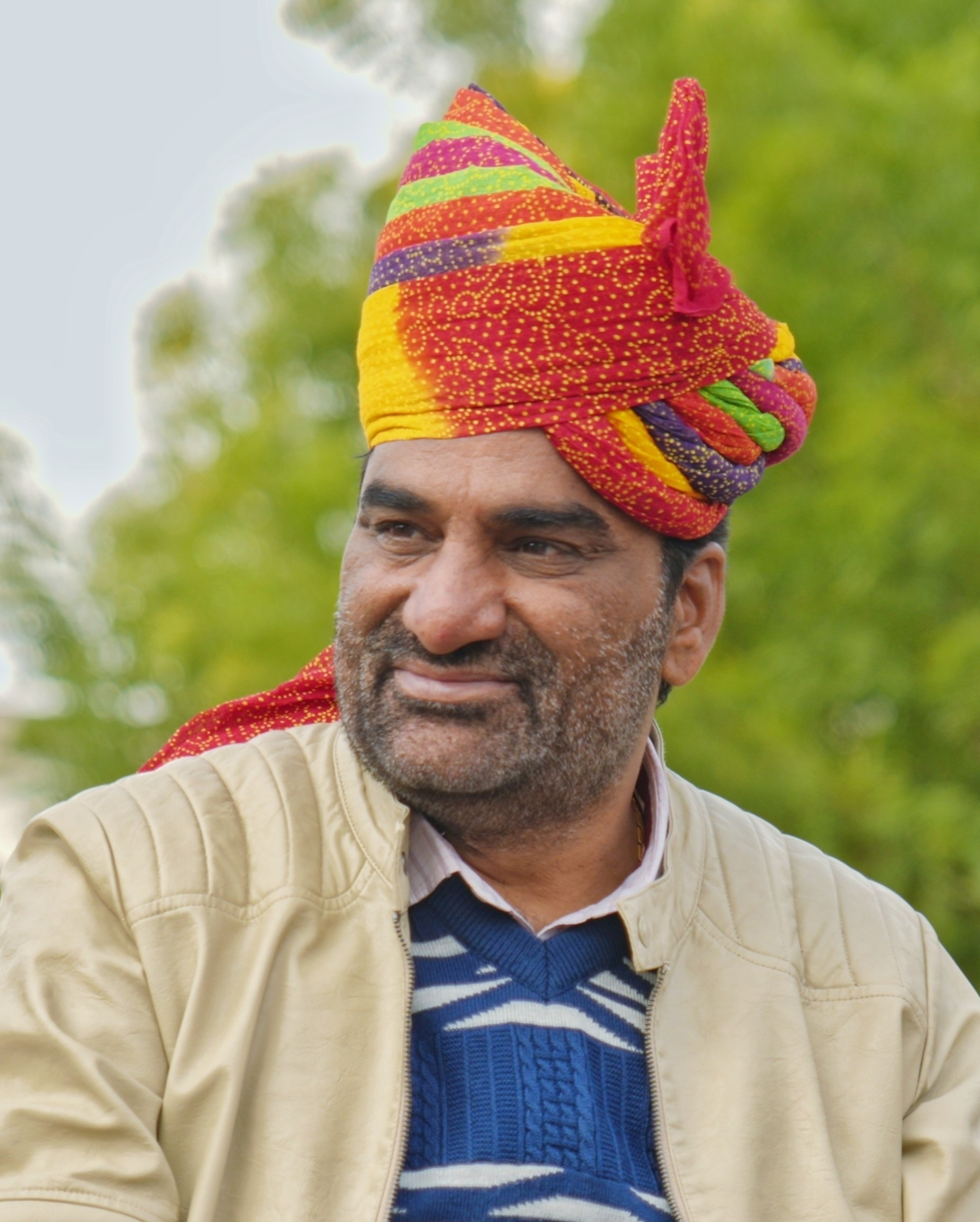
- Beniwal in 2024

Member of Parliament, Lok Sabha
- Incumbent
- Assumed office 4 June 2024
- Preceded by: Self
- In office 23 May 2019 – 15 December 2023
- Preceded by: C. R. Chaudhary
- Succeeded by: Self
- Constituency: Nagaur

Member of the Rajasthan Legislative Assembly
- In office 16 December 2023 – 18 June 2024
- Preceded by: Narayan Beniwal
- Succeeded by: Rewant Ram Danga
- In office 2008–2019
- Preceded by: Constituency established
- Succeeded by: Narayan Beniwal
- Constituency: Khinvsar

President of the Rashtriya Loktantrik Party
- Incumbent
- Assumed office 29 October 2018

President of the Rajasthan University Student Union
- In office 1997–1998

Personal details
- Born: 2 March 1972 (age 54) Barangaon, Rajasthan, India
- Party: Rashtriya Loktantrik Party (2018–present)
- Other political affiliations: Bharatiya Janata Party (2004–2013); Indian National Lok Dal (2003)
- Spouse: Kanika Beniwal (m. 2009)
- Children: 2
- Parent: Ramdev Beniwal (father)
- Education: University of Rajasthan (B.A, L.L.B)
- Occupation: Social worker, agriculturist
- Profession: Politician

Hanuman Beniwal (Hindi pronunciation: [ɦənʊˈmaːn beːˈɳiːʋaːl]; born 2 March 1972) is an Indian politician and founder of the Rashtriya Loktantrik Party (RLP). Beniwal has served as a Member of Parliament in the Lok Sabha from Nagaur since 2019. He is the founder and national convener of the Rashtriya Loktantrik Party, the third political party of Rajasthan besides the Indian National Congress and the Bharatiya Janata Party. He has been elected to the Rajasthan Legislative Assembly for four-terms from the Khinvsar constituency since 2008.

His political career began during his student life as the president of the Rajasthan University Student Union. He later entered the Politics of Rajasthan with the Bharatiya Janata Party in 2008. Beniwal later formed the Rashtriya Loktantrik Party, after accusing BJP leaders of corruption.

Beniwal is an agrarian rights activist. He resigned from the parliamentary committees and National Democratic Alliance (NDA) in opposition to the 2020 Indian agriculture acts. He has led various protests on public issues, most notably against the Rajasthan Public Service Commission (RPSC), over paper leaks, illegal sand mining in the state, and the central government’s Agnipath military recruitment scheme.

== Early life ==
Beniwal was born on 2 March 1972 to Ramdev Beniwal and Mohini Devi in Barangaon village of Nagaur district in Rajasthan. His father was a two-term member of the Rajasthan Legislative Assembly from Mundwa constituency. He belongs to the Hindu Jat community. He acquired a Bachelor of Arts degree from University of Rajasthan in 1993 and then he obtained a Bachelor of Laws degree in 1998.

== Early political career (1994–2008) ==
=== Student politics ===
Beniwal began his political career as a student leader at Rajasthan University. In 1994, Beniwal was elected president of Maharaja College, Jaipur student union, a position he held again in 1995. Beniwal became president of the Law College, Jaipur in 1996.

During the 1996 Rajasthan University student union elections, Beniwal and Mahendra Chaudhary opposed a proposed university shutdown by opposition groups. Later, a confrontation at the university gate led to a clash with police, resulting in a lathicharge. Beniwal and over a dozen students were arrested and detained at Jaipur Central Jail. They were subsequently released by the state government.

In September 1997, following a gang rape at JC Bose Hostel, public outrage grew in Jaipur. Beniwal led protests against the incident, gaining support among students. Beniwal contested and won the 1997 Rajasthan University student union elections as an independent candidate.

During his tenure as student union president, Beniwal advocated for a five percent bonus in marks for rural students during Rajasthan University's admissions, addressing disparities in educational resources. After winning the Rajasthan university elections, Beniwal launched a movement for this, leading to clashes with police and his arrest during a protest, following the protests, the university implemented the five percent bonus marks policy for rural students.

=== Jeevan godara case (2006) ===
In 2006, Beniwal and Ruparam Dudi led protests demanding justice for Jeevan Ram Godara, a student leader from Rajasthan, who was murdered along with his friend Harphool Jat by the gang of Anandpal Singh. Their protests sought a fair investigation into the killings. After prolonged legal proceedings, on 12 March 2018, the Didwana ADJ Court sentenced Sanjay Pandey, Datar Singh, and Srivallabh to life imprisonment for their role in the double murder.

== State politics (2008–present) ==
In 2003, Beniwal contested his first Rajasthan Assembly election from the Mundwa constituency on an Indian National Lok Dal (INLD) ticket. This constituency held personal significance, as it was previously represented by his father, Ramdev Beniwal, who was elected twice in 1977 and 1985. During the 2003 campaign, INLD leader and the then chief minister of Haryana, Om Prakash Chautala campaigned in Rajasthan to support Beniwal. Despite securing 35,724 votes, Beniwal was defeated by the Bharatiya Janata Party (BJP) candidate. Beniwal was first elected to 2008 Rajasthan Assembly election from Khinwsar constituency as a BJP candidate.

=== Tensions with the Bharatiya Janata Party leadership (2010s) ===
In the early 2010s, tensions escalated between Beniwal and the Bharatiya Janata Party (BJP) leadership in Rajasthan. Beniwal accused senior party members, including then-opposition leader Vasundhara Raje and Rajendra Rathore, of corruption, alleging they maintained illicit ties with Congress chief minister Ashok Gehlot. These allegations were made during a period of internal BJP factionalism in Rajasthan ahead of the 2013 state elections. The BJP leadership deemed Beniwals statements as an act of indiscipline, leading to his suspension and eventual expulsion from the Bharatiya Janata Party. No independent investigation substantiated Beniwals claims, and neither Vasundhara Raje nor Rajendra Rathore faced legal action based on these allegations. The controversy prompted Beniwals to form the Rashtriya Loktantrik Party (RLP).

After Beniwal's suspension from the Bharatiya Janata Party, he contested the 2013 assembly elections as an independent candidate and won with a margin of 23,020 votes, securing his seat in assembly for second term. During his second term, Beniwal continued to target both BJP and Congress leaders, accusing them of corruption and neglecting farmers' issues. Beniwal also demanded a CBI inquiry against state cabinet minister Yunus Khan, alleging that Khan aided gangster Anandpal Singh in escaping police custody in exchange for electoral support in 2013. However, no evidence was presented to support Beniwal's claims, and the CBI inquiry he demanded did not materialise. Khan denied the allegations, and no legal proceedings were initiated against him in connection with this matter.

On 23 September 2015, Beniwal was attacked by unidentified assailants while travelling from Jaipur to Nagaur. In response to the attack, around 500 students organised a “Kisan Yuva Aakrosh Rally” at Rajasthan University to protest the attack on Beniwal. The rally turned violent when police intervened, preceding a lathi-charge that injured 30 students and 18 policemen. The National Students Union of India (NSUI) staged a follow-up protest against police brutality.

=== Formation of the Rashtriya Loktantrik Party (2018) ===
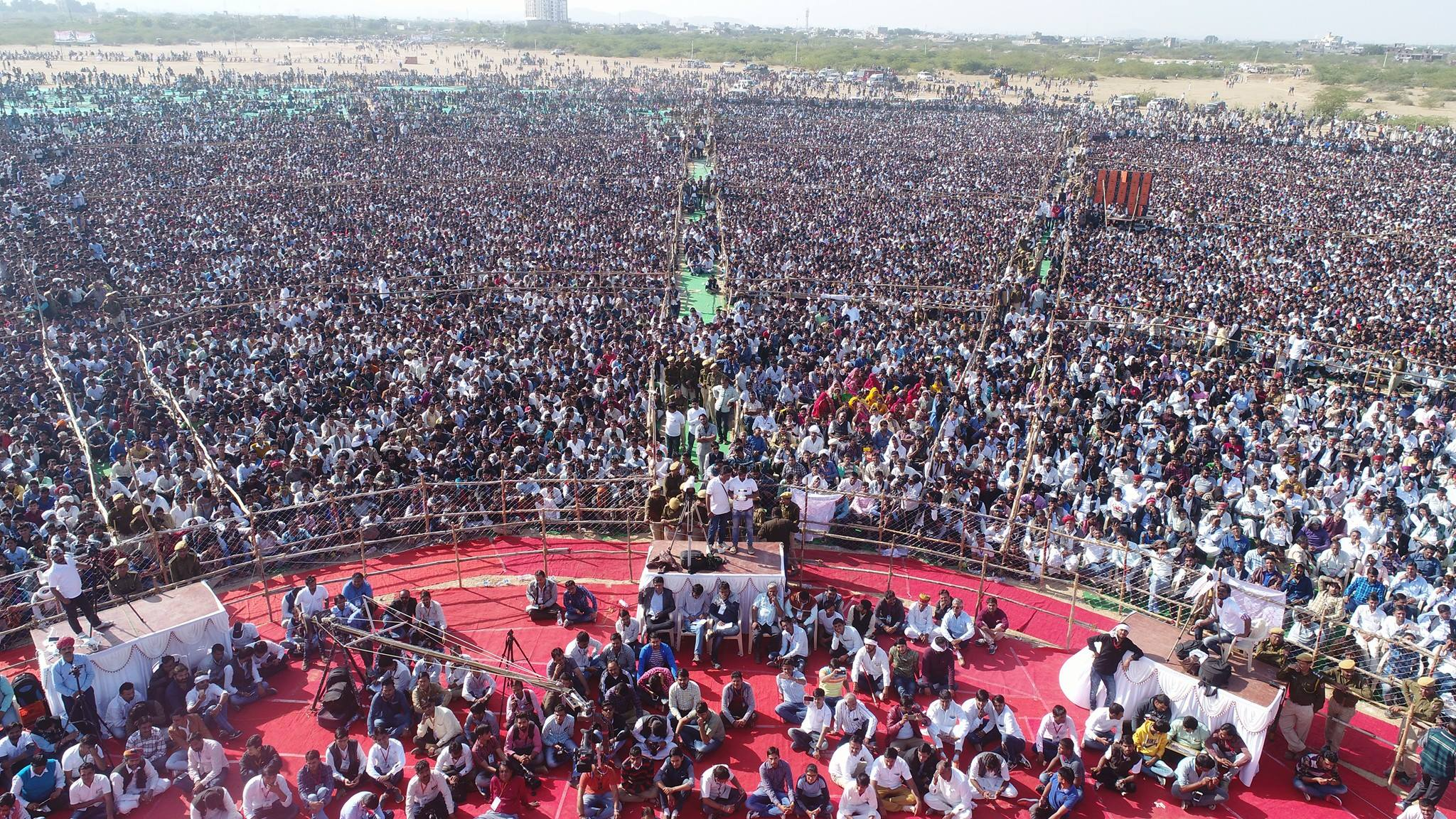
Aerial view of Kisan Hunkar Maharally at Barmer in 2018

Beniwal led the Kisan Hunkar Maha rallies in Barmer, Nagaur, Bikaner, Sikar, and Jaipur to advocate for farmers’ rights before the 2018 state elections. He demanded a complete farmer’s loan waiver, free electricity for irrigation, fair MSP, and better irrigation infrastructure, criticising the Raje government’s policies. These rallies pushed the newly elected Gehlot government to announce a partial ₹2 lakh loan waiver, which Beniwal called insufficient.

On 29 October 2018, Beniwal founded the Rashtriya Loktantrik Party (RLP) in Jaipur, and became its president and national convenor. The Rashtriya Loktantrik Party become the third-largest political party in Rajasthan, following the Indian National Congress and Bharatiya Janata Party. Beniwals party gathered support from agrarian groups, with support from leaders like Kirodi Lal Meena, Ghanshyam Tiwari and Jayant Chaudhary during its formative rallies. Beniwal contested the 2018 Rajasthan assembly elections as a member of the Rashtriya Loktantrik Party, and won the Khinwsar seat for the third term with a margin of 16,948 votes.

Beniwal then won the 2023 assembly elections by defeating BJP’s Rewant Ram Danga, who left his own Rashtriya Loktantrik Party and secured his seat in assembly for consecutive fourth term with a margin of 2059 votes. As a member of the Rashtriya Loktantrik Party (RLP), Beniwal won four elections, out of which two were assembly elections (2018 and 2023) while two were Indian general elections (2019 and 2024). RLP fielded their candidates in two assembly elections (2018 and 2023). In 2018 state elections, three members of RLP won while in 2023 state elections, seats reduced to one.

RLP also contested two bye-elections on Khinwsar constituency of Nagaur in 2019 and 2024. Beniwal fielded his brother Narayan and wife Kanika, respectively, after he vacated the seat for Lok Sabha. In the 2019 by-election, Narayan Beniwal (RLP) defeated Congress Harendra Mirdha by a margin of 4,630 votes. However, in the 2024 by-election, Kanika Beniwal (RLP) lost to BJP’s Rewant Ram, a former RLP defector, by 13,901 votes, marking the first time since 2008 that a non-Beniwal won the Khinwsar seat. The defeat, exacerbated by opposition from Jat families like the Midas and Madernas and RLP defections.

== National politics (2019–present) ==
Beniwal's entry into national politics began after the 2019 general election, when he won from Nagaur constituency, as an RLP candidate in alliance with the Bharatiya Janata Party (BJP)-led NDA. He defeated Congress candidate Jyoti Mirdha by a margin of 181,260 votes, securing his first term in Lok Sabha. Previously he unsuccessfully contested the 2014 general election and came to third position with 159,980 votes as an independent candidate. Beniwal focused on farmers’ issues and brought them in the Parliament, advocating for policies to address agricultural distress, such as loan waivers and better minimum support prices (MSP).

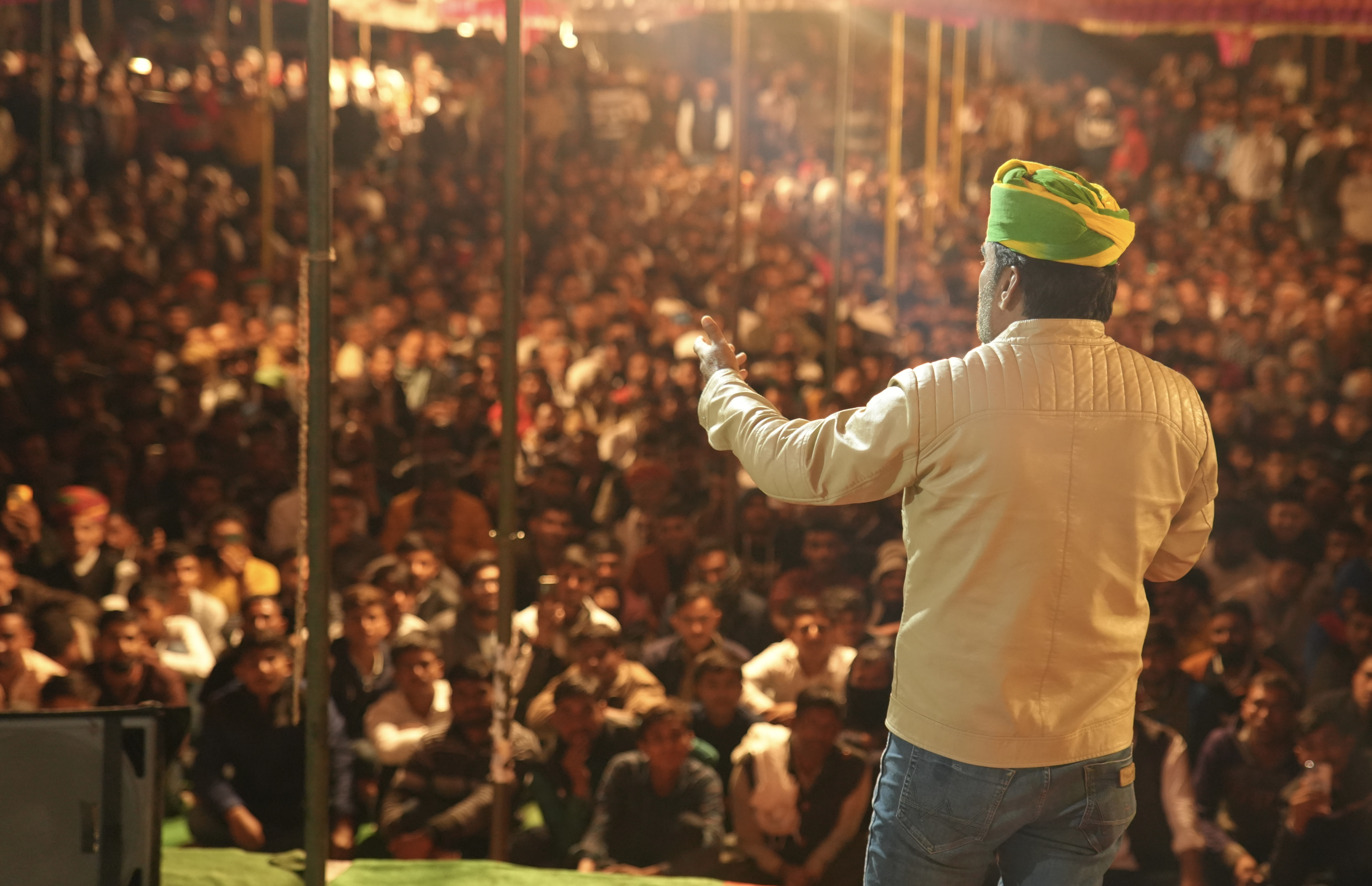
Beniwal addressing public in 2021

In 2020, Beniwal opposed to the three farm laws introduced by the modi government. At the time, Beniwal was a Member of Parliament in alliance with the Bharatiya Janata Party. Despite his alignment with the BJP, Beniwals deep ties to the agricultural community and his history of advocating for farmers’ rights positioned him as a natural ally for the nationwide farmer protests.

Beniwal mobilised farmer communities in the Shekhawati and Nagaur regions, to join the protests against the farm laws. He organised rallies, including a march from Rajasthan to Delhi. On 8 December 2020, Beniwal supported the Bharat Bandh, a nationwide strike called by farmer unions. He subsequently resigned from three parliamentary committees—on agriculture, food processing, and the public accounts committee. On 26 December 2020, Beniwal announced the RLP’s withdrawal from the NDA, accusing the central government of betraying farmers and ignoring their trouble. He stated:

Despite the farmers' protests, the Narendra Modi government is not withdrawing farm laws because it has 303 MPs. Farmers from 1,200 kilometres away in Rajasthan are moving towards Delhi to be a part of the agitation. As the issues remained unheard and due to the farmers' agitation, I am tendering my resignation from the committees.

— Hanuman Beniwal, India Today

On 13 December 2023, an attack occurred in chamber of the Indian Parliament, coinciding with the anniversary of the 2001 Parliament attack. Two intruders, Sagar Sharma and Manoranjan D, jumped from the public gallery into the chamber, releasing yellow smoke canisters and shouting slogans, while two others sprayed coloured gas outside the Parliament premises. Beniwal was among the first parliamentarians to react when the intruders entered the Lok Sabha chamber during zero hour, around 1:01 PM, as BJP MP Khagen Murmu was speaking. Alongside other MPs, including Gurjeet Singh Aujla and Malook Nagar, Beniwal intercepted and detained one of the intruders. During this incident around 150 MPs, including prominent leaders like Rahul Gandhi and defence minister Rajnath Singh, were present in the house at the time. In a statement to the media, Beniwal, describing the events of the attack, stated “Herogiri unki utar di” (which roughly translates to “taught them a lesson”).

Beniwal then contested the 2024 general election in alliance with the Congress-led INDIA bloc and won the election against BJP candidate Jyoti Mirdha with a margin of 42,225 votes.

After the results of general elections, Beniwal expressed disappointment over being sidelined by the Indian National Developmental Inclusive Alliance (INDIA) bloc. Beniwal criticised his exclusion from INDIA bloc meetings in Delhi on 1 and 5 June 2024, attributing it to the RLP’s smaller size. While reaffirming his alliance commitment, Beniwal hinted at future uncertainty, stating, "Today I am with the INDIA bloc, but no one can be certain about tomorrow." He also denied immediate plans to join the NDA. Later, the Congress president, Mallikarjun Kharge, apologised to Beniwal for not inviting him. Congress general secretary K. C. Venugopal also spoke to Beniwal regarding his disappointment.

Beniwal served as member of institute body at the All India Institute of Medical Sciences, Jodhpur.

Beniwal addressed a Jat community maha-panchayat on the Jaipur-Agra National Highway in Bharatpur, Rajasthan on 29 June 2025. He demanded OBC reservation for the Jat community of Bharatpur, Dholpur, and Deeg districts in central government services. Bharatpur MP Sanjna Jatav, also participated in the maha-panchayat, and a memorandum was submitted to the district collector, addressed to prime minister Narendra Modi, highlighting the exclusion of these districts’ Jats from the 1998 central OBC reservation granted to Jats of Rajasthan.

== Electoral performance ==
Beniwal in his career contested eight elections, out of which five of them were assembly elections (2003, 2008, 2013, 2018 and 2023), while three were general parliamentary elections (2014, 2019 and 2024), and he won six elections out of these eight elections, had lost one assembly election in 2003 and then a general election in 2014.

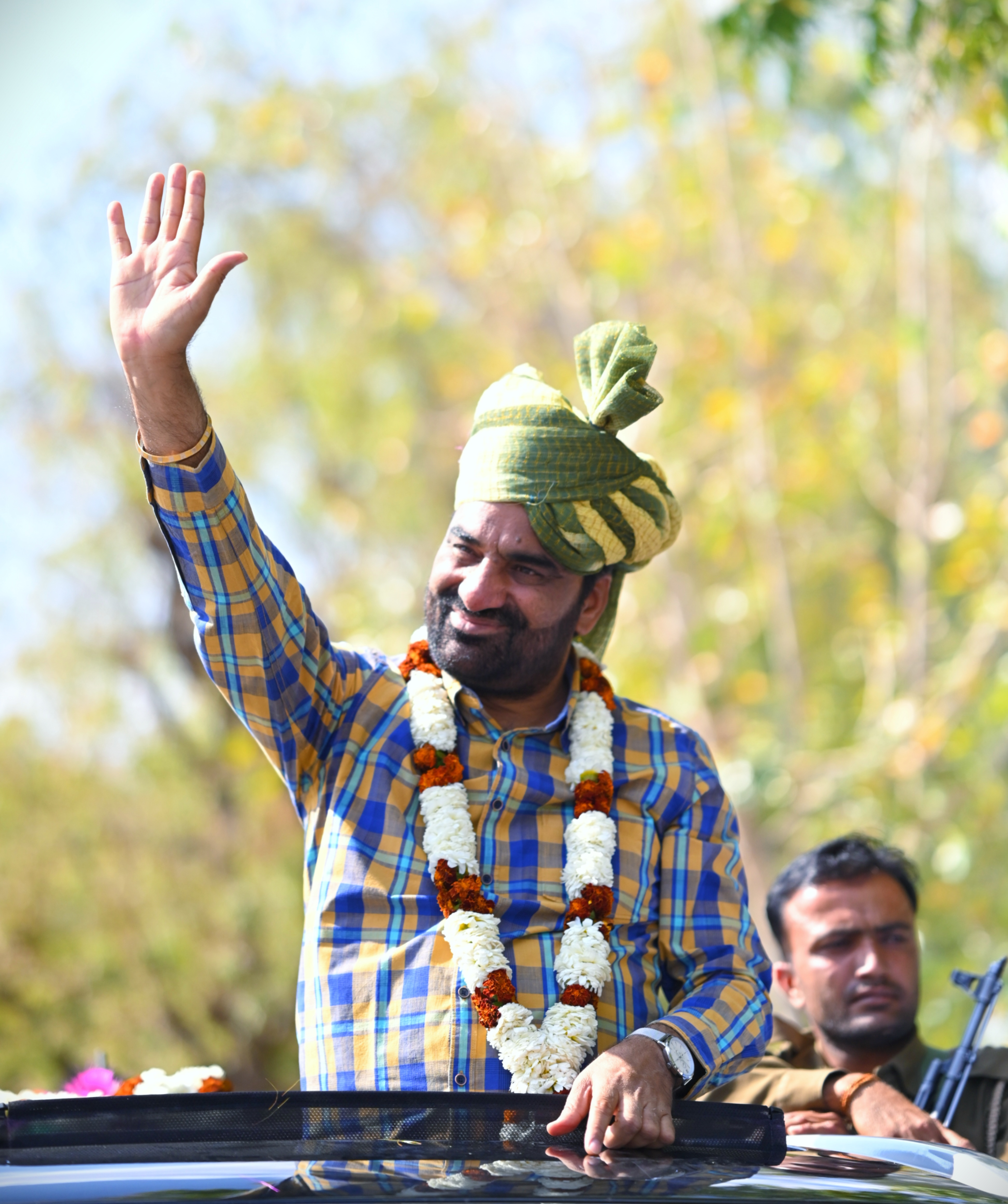
Beniwal in a rally on the eve of 2023 Rajasthan Assembly elections

Beniwal first contested an assembly election in 2003 on ticket of Indian National Lok Dal (INLD), later contesting the 2008 assembly election as a Bharatiya Janata Party (BJP) candidate. After being suspended from the BJP, Beniwal contested the 2013 assembly election and 2014 general elections as an independent candidate. Later he founded his own party on the eve of 2018 Rajasthan Assembly elections and since then he contested all elections under RLP banner.

=== Summary ===
Year	House	Constituency	Party	Votes	Result	Source
2003	Rajasthan Legislative Assembly	Mundwa	INLD	35,724	Lost	
2008	Rajasthan Legislative Assembly	Khinwsar	BJP	58,760	Won	
2013	Rajasthan Legislative Assembly	Khinwsar	Independent	65,399	Won	
2018	Rajasthan Legislative Assembly	Khinwsar	RLP	83,096	Won	
2023	Rajasthan Legislative Assembly	Khinwsar	RLP	79,492	Won	
2014	Lok Sabha	Nagaur	Independent	159,980	Lost	
2019	Lok Sabha	Nagaur	RLP	660,051	Won	
2024	Lok Sabha	Nagaur	RLP	596,955	Won	

== Positions held ==
Key

- ^{RES} Resigned

Year	Position
2008–2013	Member, 13th Rajasthan Legislative Assembly: Member, Home Committee; Member, Public Accounts Committee
2013–2018	Member, 14th Rajasthan Legislative Assembly: Member, Question and Reference Committee; Member, Committee on Welfare of Backward Classes
2018–2019	Member, 15th Rajasthan Legislative Assembly: Member, Business Advisory Committee; Member, Committee on Welfare of Backward Classes; Member, Home Committee
2019–2023	Elected to the 17th Lok Sabha: Member, Consultative Committee, Petroleum and Natural Gas ^{[RES]}; Member, Standing Committee on Industry ^{[RES]}; Member, Standing Committee on Defence; Member, Committee on Petitions ^{[RES]}
2023–2024	Member, 16th Rajasthan Legislative Assembly
2024–present	Elected to the 18th Lok Sabha: Member, Committee on Industry
	Source:

=== Other positions held ===
Year	Position
1994–1995	President of student union Rajasthan College, Jaipur
1995–1996	President of student union Rajasthan College, Jaipur
1996–1997	President of student union Law College, Jaipur
1997–1998	President of student union Rajasthan University
1998–2009	Member, State Executive Committee, BJP, Rajasthan
2005–2008	Member, Zila Parishad, Nagaur (Rajasthan)
2018–present	President of the Rashtriya Loktantrik Party
2024–present	Member, Institute Body, AIIMS Jodhpur
	Source:

== Personal life ==
He married Kanika Beniwal on 9 December 2009. The couple has two children; a son Ashutosh and a daughter Diya. Kanika hails from Sri Ganganagar and did Bachelor of Science from Mohanlal Sukhadia University, Udaipur.

On the eve of 2024 Rajasthan Assembly By-elections, Kanika contested from Khinwsar on Rashtriya Loktantrik Party ticket, but lost to BJP Rewant Ram Danga by 13,901 votes.

Beniwal is a follower of folk deity Veer Teja, and Indian revolutionary Bhagat Singh.

His younger brother, Narayan Beniwal, is a former member of the Rajasthan Legislative Assembly representing Khinwsar constituency in Nagaur.
