= Mandukara =

Village in Nagaur District, Rajasthan, India

- village
- Location in Rajasthan, India Mandukara (India)
- Coordinates: 27.1656°N 74.4504°E
- Country: India
- State: Rajasthan
- District: Nagaur

Government
  - Type: Panchayati raj (India)
  - Body: Gram panchayat
- Elevation: 342 m (1,122 ft)

Population (2011)
  - Total: 2,793

Languages
  - Official: Marwari, Hindi
- Time zone: UTC+5:30 (IST)
- PIN: 341319
- Nearest city: Didwana

Mandukara or Mandukra is a village located in Didwana tehsil in Nagaur of Rajasthan state, India.

It is located 161 kilometres (100 mi) from Jaipur, 220 kilometres (137 mi) from Jodhpur, and 446 kilometres (277 mi) from Mount Abu.

The village is administrated by a sarpanch (head of the village) who is elected every five years. In 2011 the population of the village was 2,793, with 519 households.

Mandukara village is the birthplace of Chetan Dudi who is an MLA from Deedwana Assembly constituency.
