= Merta Assembly constituency =

Legislative Assembly constituency in Rajasthan State, India

Coordinates: 26.65°N 74.03°E

Merta
- Constituency No. 111 for the Rajasthan Legislative Assembly

Constituency details
- Country: India
- Region: North India
- State: Rajasthan
- District: Nagaur
- Lok Sabha constituency: Rajsamand
- Established: 1957
- Total electors: 286,760
- Reservation: SC

Member of Legislative Assembly
- 16th Rajasthan Legislative Assembly
- Incumbent Laxmanram Meghwal
- Party: BJP
- Elected year: 2023

Merta Assembly constituency is one of the 200 Legislative Assembly constituencies of Rajasthan state in India. It is in Nagaur district and is reserved for candidates belonging to the Scheduled Castes. It is also part of Rajsamand Lok Sabha constituency.

== Members of the Legislative Assembly ==
Election	Member	Party
1957	Gopal Lal	Indian National Congress
1962	Nathu Ram	Indian National Congress
1967	Gordhan	Swatantra Party
1972	Ram Lal	Indian National Congress
1977	Ram Lal	Indian National Congress
1980	Ram Lal	Indian National Congress
1985	Nathu Ram	Lok Dal
1990	Ram Karan	Janata Dal
1993	Bhanwar Singh Dangawas	Bharatiya Janata Party
1998	Mangi Lal Danga	Indian National Congress
2003	Bhanwar Singh Dangawas	Bharatiya Janata Party
2004 (By-election)	Ramchandra	Indian National Congress
2008	Sukharam Netdiya	Bharatiya Janata Party
2013	Sukharam Netdiya	Bharatiya Janata Party
2018	Indira Devi	Rashtriya Loktantrik Party
2023	Laxmanram Meghwal	Bhartiya Janata Party

== Election results ==
=== 2023 ===
2023 Rajasthan Legislative Assembly election: Merta
Party	Candidate	Votes	%	±%
BJP	Laxman Ram	77,493	38.36	+15.12
INC	Shivratan (Chiman Valmiki)	59,978	29.69	+16.35
RLP	Indira Devi	56,761	28.1	−3.92
Abhinav Rajasthan Party	Madan Lal Balotiya	3,540	1.75	
NOTA	None of the above	1,939	0.96	−0.69
Majority		17,515	8.67	+1.54
Turnout		202,030	70.45	−0.9
BJP gain from RLP		Swing		

=== 2018 ===
Rajasthan Legislative Assembly Election, 2018: Merta
Party	Candidate	Votes	%	±%
RLP	Indira Devi	57,662	32.02	
Independent	Laxman Ram Meghwal	44,827	24.89	
BJP	Bhanwraram Rithadiya	41,860	23.24	
INC	Sonu Chitara Choudhary	24,018	13.34	
AAP	Jagdish Kumar Nayak	3,180	1.77	
NOTA	None of the above	2,970	1.65	
Majority		12,835	7.13	
Turnout		180,092	71.35	

== See also ==
- Merta City
- Nagaur district
- List of constituencies of Rajasthan Legislative Assembly
