= G. H. Somani =

Indian politician

G H Somani

Member of Parliament, Lok Sabha
- In office 1957–1962
- Preceded by: Raj Bahadur
- Succeeded by: Prithvi Raj
- Constituency: Dausa, Rajasthan.
- In office 1952-1957
- Succeeded by: Mathuradas Mathur
- Constituency: Nagaur

Personal details
- Born: April 1908
- Party: Indian National Congress
- Spouse: Bhagwati Devi

Gajadhar Hajarilal Somani was an Indian politician. He was elected to the Lok Sabha, the lower house of the Parliament of India from Dausa, Rajasthan as a member of the Indian National Congress.
