= Nagaur Lok Sabha constituency =

Lok Sabha constituency in Rajasthan

Coordinates: 27.2°N 73.7°E

Nagaur
- Lok Sabha constituency
- Interactive Map Outlining Nagaur Lok Sabha Constituency

Constituency details
- Country: India
- Region: North India
- State: Rajasthan
- Assembly constituencies: Ladnun; Deedwana; Jayal; Nagaur; Khinwsar; Makrana; Parbatsar; Nawan
- Established: 1952
- Reservation: None

Member of Parliament
- 18th Lok Sabha
- Incumbent Hanuman Beniwal
- Party: RLP
- Alliance: INDIA
- Elected year: 2024

Nagaur Lok Sabha constituency (Hindi pronunciation: [n̪aːgɔːɾ]) is one of the 25 Lok Sabha (parliamentary) constituencies in Rajasthan state in India. Hanuman Beniwal is incumbent member of the Lok Sabha from Nagaur.

== Assembly segments ==
Presently, Nagaur Lok Sabha constituency comprises eight Vidhan Sabha (legislative assembly) segments. These are:

| # | Name | District | Member | Party | 2024 Lead |
|---|---|---|---|---|---|
| 106 | Ladnun | Nagaur | Mukesh Bhakar | INC | BJP |
| 107 | Deedwana | Nagaur | Yoonus Khan | IND | RLP |
| 108 | Jayal (SC) | Nagaur | Manju Baghmar | BJP | RLP |
| 109 | Nagaur | Nagaur | Harendra Mirdha | INC | RLP |
| 110 | Khinwsar | Nagaur | Rewant Ram Danga | BJP | RLP |
| 113 | Makrana | Nagaur | Zakir Hussain Gesawat | INC | RLP |
| 114 | Parbatsar | Nagaur | Ramniwas Gawriya | INC | BJP |
| 115 | Nawan | Nagaur | Vijay Singh | BJP | BJP |

Degana and Merta are the other tehsils (Vidhansabha Constituency) of Nagaur district which are not part of Nagaur Lok Sabha Constituency. Constituency delimitation commission before 2009 General Election, Separated Degana and Merta from Nagaur Loksabha Constituency and made them part of Rajsamand (Lok Sabha constituency).

== Members of Parliament ==
| Year | Member | Party |
|---|---|---|
| 1952 | G. D. Somani | Independent |
| 1957 | Mathuradas Mathur | Indian National Congress |
| 1962 | S. K. Dey | Indian National Congress |
| 1967 | N. K. Somani | Swatantra Party |
| 1971 | Nathuram Mirdha | Indian National Congress |
| 1977 | Nathuram Mirdha | Indian National Congress |
| 1980 | Nathuram Mirdha | Indian National Congress (U) |
| 1984 | Ram Niwas Mirdha | Indian National Congress |
| 1989 | Nathuram Mirdha | Janata Dal |
| 1991 | Nathuram Mirdha | Indian National Congress |
| 1996 | Nathuram Mirdha | Indian National Congress |
| 1997^ | Bhanu Prakash Mirdha | Bharatiya Janata Party |
| 1998 | Ram Raghunath Choudhary | Indian National Congress |
| 1999 | Ram Raghunath Choudhary | Indian National Congress |
| 2004 | Bhanwar Singh Dangawas | Bharatiya Janata Party |
| 2009 | Jyoti Mirdha | Indian National Congress |
| 2014 | C. R. Chaudhary | Bharatiya Janata Party |
| 2019 | Hanuman Beniwal | Rashtriya Loktantrik Party |
| 2024 | Hanuman Beniwal | Rashtriya Loktantrik Party |

== Election results ==
=== 2024 ===
2024 Indian general election: Nagaur
| Party | Candidate | Votes | % | ±% |
|---|---|---|---|---|
| RLP | Hanuman Beniwal | 596,955 | 48.20 | ▼6.59 |
| BJP | Jyoti Mirdha | 554,730 | 44.79 | ▲3.48 |
| BSP | Gajendra singh Rathore | 24,008 | 1.94 | ▼N/A |
| NOTA | None of the above | 8771 | 0.71 | ▼0.37 |
| Majority | | 42,225 | 3.41 | ▼11.65 |
| Turnout | | 1,238,473 | 57.69 | ▼4.55 |
| RLP hold | | Swing | | |

=== 2019 ===
2019 Indian general elections: Nagaur
| Party | Candidate | Votes | % | ±% |
|---|---|---|---|---|
| RLP | Hanuman Beniwal | 660,051 | 54.79 | New |
| INC | Jyoti Mirdha | 4,78,791 | 39.74 | |
| NOTA | None of the above | 13,049 | 1.08 | |
| IND | Saroj Prajapat | 12,785 | 1.06 | |
| Majority | | 1,81,260 | 15.06 | |
| Turnout | | 12,03,124 | 62.24 | |
| RLP gain from BJP | | Swing | | |

=== 2014 ===
2014 Indian general elections: Nagaur
| Party | Candidate | Votes | % | ±% |
|---|---|---|---|---|
| BJP | C. R. Chaudhary | 414,791 | 41.31 | |
| INC | Jyoti Mirdha | 3,39,573 | 33.82 | |
| IND | Hanuman Beniwal | 1,59,980 | 15.93 | |
| NOTA | None of the above | 12,185 | 1.21 | |
| Majority | | 75,218 | 7.49 | |
| Turnout | | 10,05,523 | 59.81 | |
| BJP gain from INC | | Swing | | |

=== 2009 ===
2009 Indian general elections: Nagaur
| Party | Candidate | Votes | % | ±% |
|---|---|---|---|---|
| INC | Jyoti Mirdha | 333,261 | 54.59 | |
| BJP | Bindu Chaudhary | 1,78,124 | 29.18 | |
| BSP | Abdul Aziz | 68,434 | 11.21 | |
| IND | Vinod Kumar Pitti | 8,892 | 1.46 | |
| Majority | | 1,55,137 | 25.44 | |
| Turnout | | 6,09,879 | 41.03 | |
| INC gain from BJP | | Swing | | |

=== 2004 ===
2004 Indian general elections: Nagaur
| Party | Candidate | Votes | % | ±% |
|---|---|---|---|---|
| BJP | Bhanwar Singh Dangawas | 456,789 | 45.08 | +13.94 |
| INC | Ram Raghunath Choudhary | 2,14,006 | 33.89 | −4.13 |
| BSP | Mool Chand | 1,07,757 | 17.06 | −12.43 |
| Independent | Bhanwar Singh Rathore | 9,888 | 1.57 | |
| NLP | Nawab Khan | 7,677 | 1.22 | |
| Independent | Kailash | 3,842 | 0.61 | |
| Independent | Bhanu Prakash | 3,620 | 0.57 | |
| Majority | | 70,627 | 11.19 | +4.31 |
| Turnout | | 6,31,471 | 44.02 | −13.64 |
| BJP gain from INC | | Swing | +13.94 | |

== See also ==
- Nagaur district
- List of constituencies of the Lok Sabha
