= Veron ka Math =

Veron ka Math is the originating point of Banas River, situated in the Kumbhalgarh block of Rajsamand district in the state of Rajasthan. It is 8 km west of the Kumbhalgarh on the NH 162 Ext. There is a Shiva temple and other deities in the temple complex.

== See also ==
- Kumbhalgarh Wildlife Sanctuary
