= Sukharam Netdiya =

Indian politician

- सुखराम नेटड़िया

Member of 13th Rajasthan Assembly
- In office 2008–2013
- Preceded by: Pancharam Indawar
- Succeeded by: Sukharam Netdiya
- Constituency: Merta

Member of 14th Rajasthan Assembly
- In office 2013–2018
- Preceded by: Laxmanram Meghwal
- Succeeded by: Indira Devi
- Constituency: Merta

Personal details
- Party: Bhartiya Janta Party
- Occupation: Politician

Sukharam Netdiya is an Indian politician who served as a member of the 13th Rajasthan Legislative Assembly and 14th Rajasthan Legislative Assembly. He is a member of Bhartiya Janta Party.

He represented Merta Assembly constituency in Nagaur district from 2008 to 2018.
