= Rundera =

Village In Udaipur, Rajasthan

Rundera is a town in the Vallabhnagar tehsil of the Udaipur district, in Rajasthan, India. It is 12 km from Vallabhnagar and 45 km from Udaipur. Rundera is known for its Rang Teras festival and the folk dance Gair. Rang Teras is one of the chief Hindu festivals that is celebrated on the 13th day of Holi or during the Krishna Paksha of the Hindu month of Chaitra.

Many of the people from Rundera live abroad {like Dubai, Oman, Hong Kong, UK, US and Russia}. This village is a rich village in terms of per capita income.

People from Menaria, Jat, Janwa, Tiwari, Lohar, Suthar, Nai and Meghwal community reside in Rundera. The town is well connected to nearby cities and villages by means of road transportation facilities. It is located on the Udaipur-Ahmedabad-Kishangarh expressway. Common languages spoken include Rajasthani (Mewari) and Hindi.

The town has also been included under the Smart Village mission initiated by the Government of India.

Area: 2120 hectares.
