= C. R. Chaudhary =

Indian politician

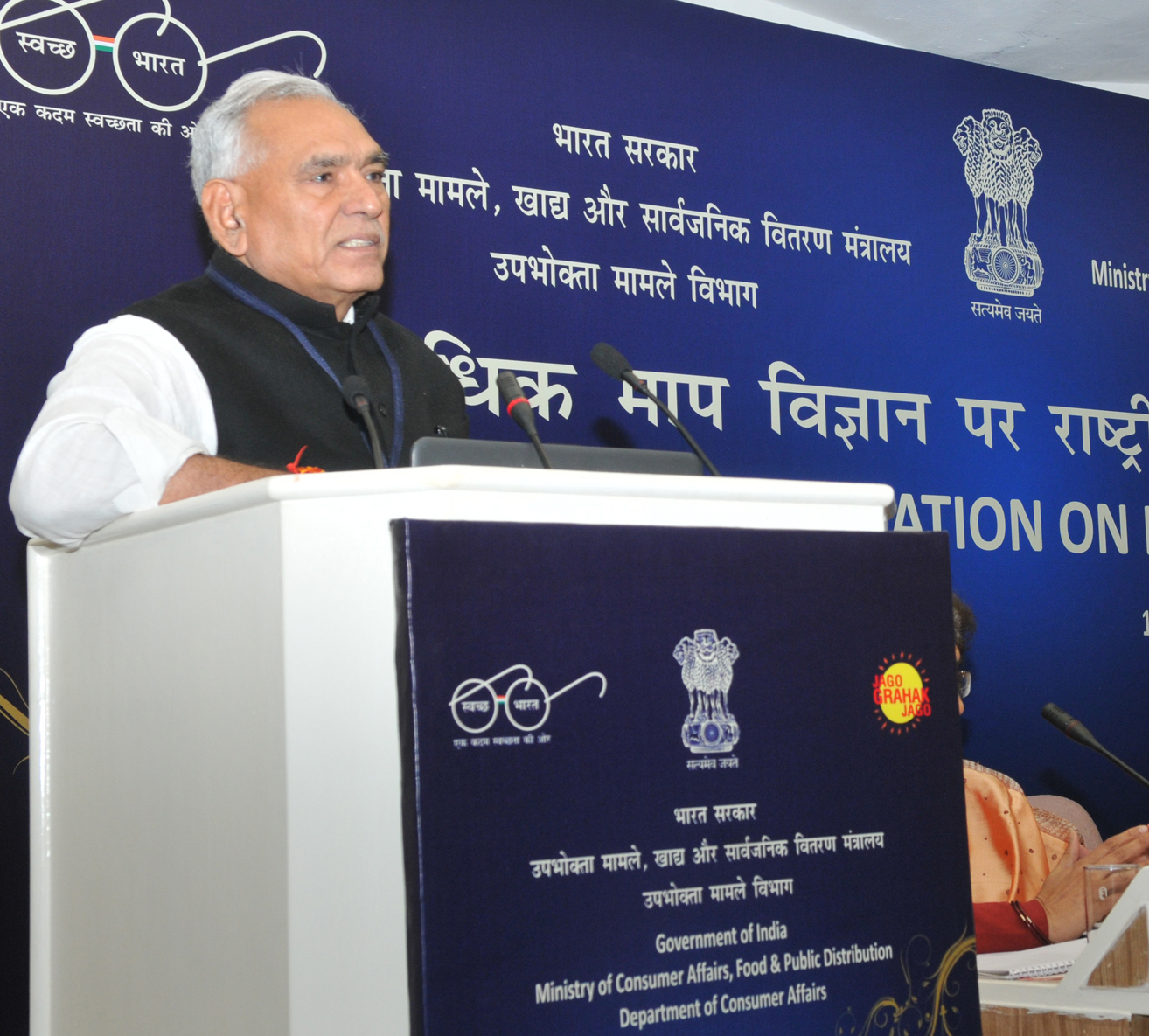

Ministry of state for Commerce and Industry
- In office 3 September 2017 – 30 May 2019
- Prime Minister: Narendra Modi
- Minister: Suresh Prabhu

Minister of state for Consumer Affairs, Food & Public Distribution
- In office 5 July 2016 – 30 May 2019
- Prime Minister: Narendra Modi
- Minister: Ram Vilas Paswan

Member of Parliament, Lok Sabha
- In office 16 May 2014 – 23 May 2019
- Preceded by: Jyoti Mirdha
- Succeeded by: Hanuman Beniwal
- Constituency: Nagaur

Personal details
- Born: 1 March 1948 (age 78) Dhandhlas, Jodhpur State, India (now Rajasthan)
- Party: Bharatiya Janata Party
- Spouse: Mala Chaudhary (m. 1958; died 2020)
- Children: 2
- Education: Rajasthan University
- Occupation: civil servant (Retd), Politician
- Website: www.crchaudharynagaur.com

Chhotu Ram Chaudhary (born 1 March 1948) better known as C.R. Chaudhary is an Indian politician and a retired IAS officer who served as member of 16th Lok Sabha, the lower house of the Indian Parliament. He is a member of the Bharatiya Janata Party. He won 2014 Indian general elections from the Nagaur Constituency in Rajasthan. He is currently president of Rajasthan Kisan Aayog since March 2024. He served as Minister of State of the Department of Consumer Affairs, Food and Public Distribution. In the cabinet expansion of September 2017, he was also named Minister of State for the Ministry of Commence and Industry. He started career as College Lecturer in Government College Sirohi, Dausa and Ajmer from 1971–1977. He is also a Retd. IAS and Ex- Chairman of Rajasthan Public Service Commission from 2006–2010.

== Early life and education ==
Chaudhary was born in a traditional Marwari family on 1 March 1948 in Dhandhalas, Nagaur, Rajasthan to Late Shri. R.L Chaudhary and Smt. Gavri Devi. He married Smt. Mala Chaudhary on 1 May 1958. He pursued his education at the University of Rajasthan in Jaipur and received a Master of Arts degree in Geography.

== Early professional career ==
After completing his education, Chaudhary started his professional career as a college lecturer in 1971. He had an enriching experience of teaching in Govt. College Sirohi, Dausa and Ajmer from 1971–1977.

== Administrative career ==
Chaudhary was selected in the prestigious Rajasthan Administrative Service in 1978 and he left his job as a Lecturer to pursue the career of an administrator. During his tenure in Rajasthan Government he served as S.D.M., Additional Collector & Additional Magistrate at various locations in the state. In recognition of his persistent and committed effort towards corruption free government and good governance he was awarded Merit Certificate in 1988 by the Government of Rajasthan in state level function of 15 August by Chief Minister of Rajasthan.

Later, he worked as Head of Department & Director in Lotteries, Government of Rajasthan from 1996-1997; Head of department and Executive Director Rajasthan State Road Transport Corporation from 2000 to 2011; and Head of department and Director in Agricultural Marketing from 2001 to 2002. Upon his promotion as an Indian Administrative Service (I.A.S.) officer, he was nominated as member of Rajasthan Public Service Commission (R.P.S.C.) in 2002. He served as member in RPSC till 2006. In 2006 he was made chairman of RPSC and served the commission till 2010.

== Member of Parliament ==
Chaudhary was elected to the 16th Lok Sabha of Indian Parliament as a Member of Parliament (MP) from Nagaur Constituency, Rajasthan. As a member of parliament he served as Member of the following committees:

(i) Committee on Subordinate Legislation

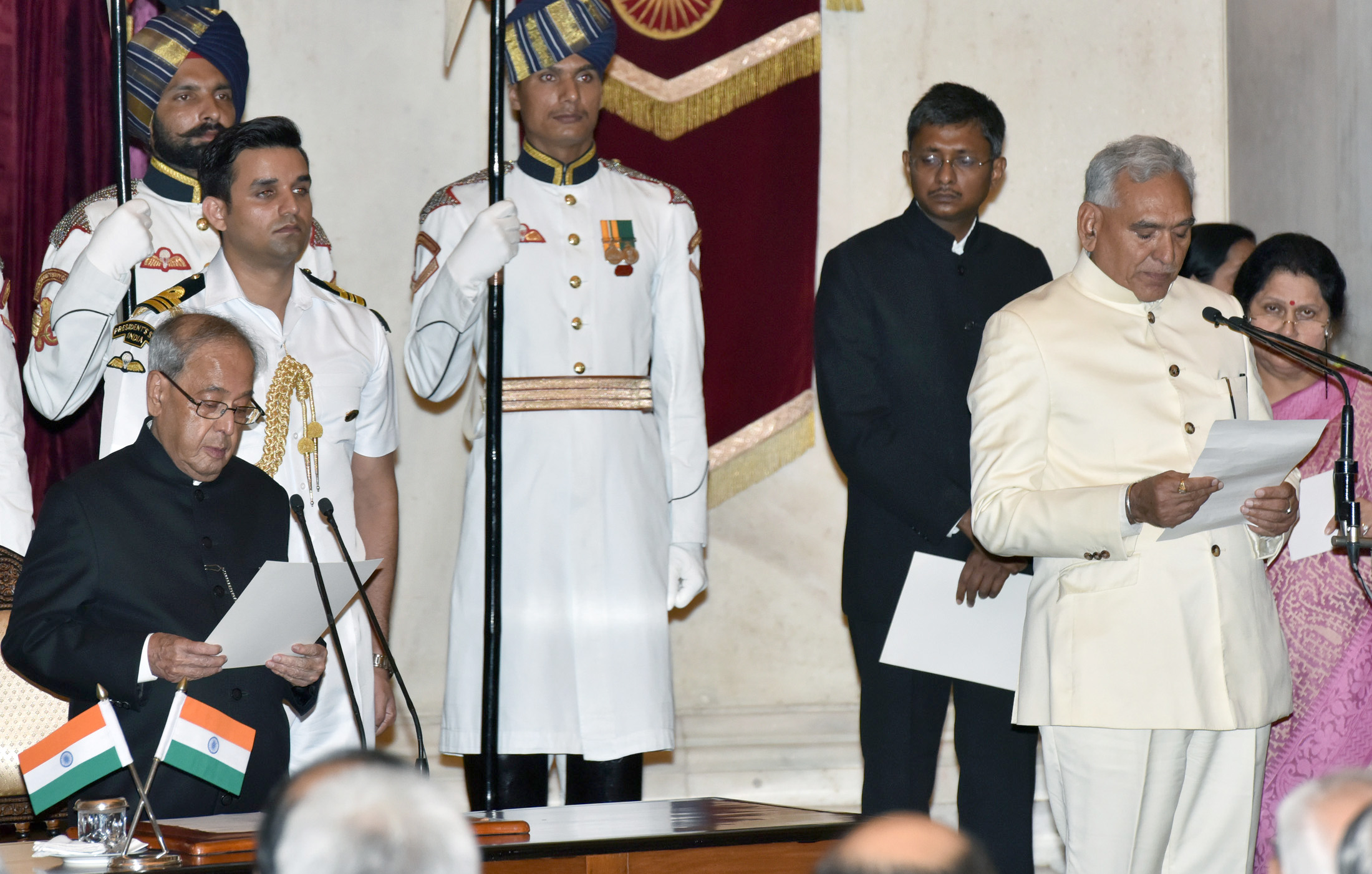
Oath Taking Ceremony of CR Chaudhary

(ii) Standing Committee on Human Resource development

(iii) Consultative Committee, Ministry of Road Transport and Highway & Shipping.

As a parliamentarian he had attendance record of 97%, participated in 133 debates, and asked 322 questions. He was one of the foremost of all the parliamentarians in terms of these performance parameters.

== Minister of State, Commerce and Industry (Additional Charge) ==
In September 2017 Chaudhary was given additional charge of Minister of State, Commerce and Industry. While he was in office the Foreign Direct Investments (FDI) of India increased from $152 billion in year 2010-2014 to $218 billion in 2014- Feb 2018. 25 Sectors covering 100 areas of FDI policy have undergone reforms. The process of granting FDI approval has been erased with dissolution of FIPB. During his tenure India rank improved from 142 to 100 on world Banks Doing Business Assessment. In a boost to Make in India Campaign of Government of India a jump of 15 places was seen by India in Global Innovation Index. While in Logistic Performance index a jump of 19 places was seen. On global competitiveness index a jump of 32 places was seen.

== Personal life ==
Chaudhary is vegetarian by diet, an adherent of his religion and a strong believer of symbiotic relation between art of spiritualism and science of governance. He has been a proponent of education for girls and has served as Honorary Chairman of Veer Teja Mahila Shikshan & Shoudh Sansthan Marwar Mundwa. In these institutions girls are provided education from class VI to B.Ed. at a very affordable cost. Very poor and orphaned girls are provided free education.

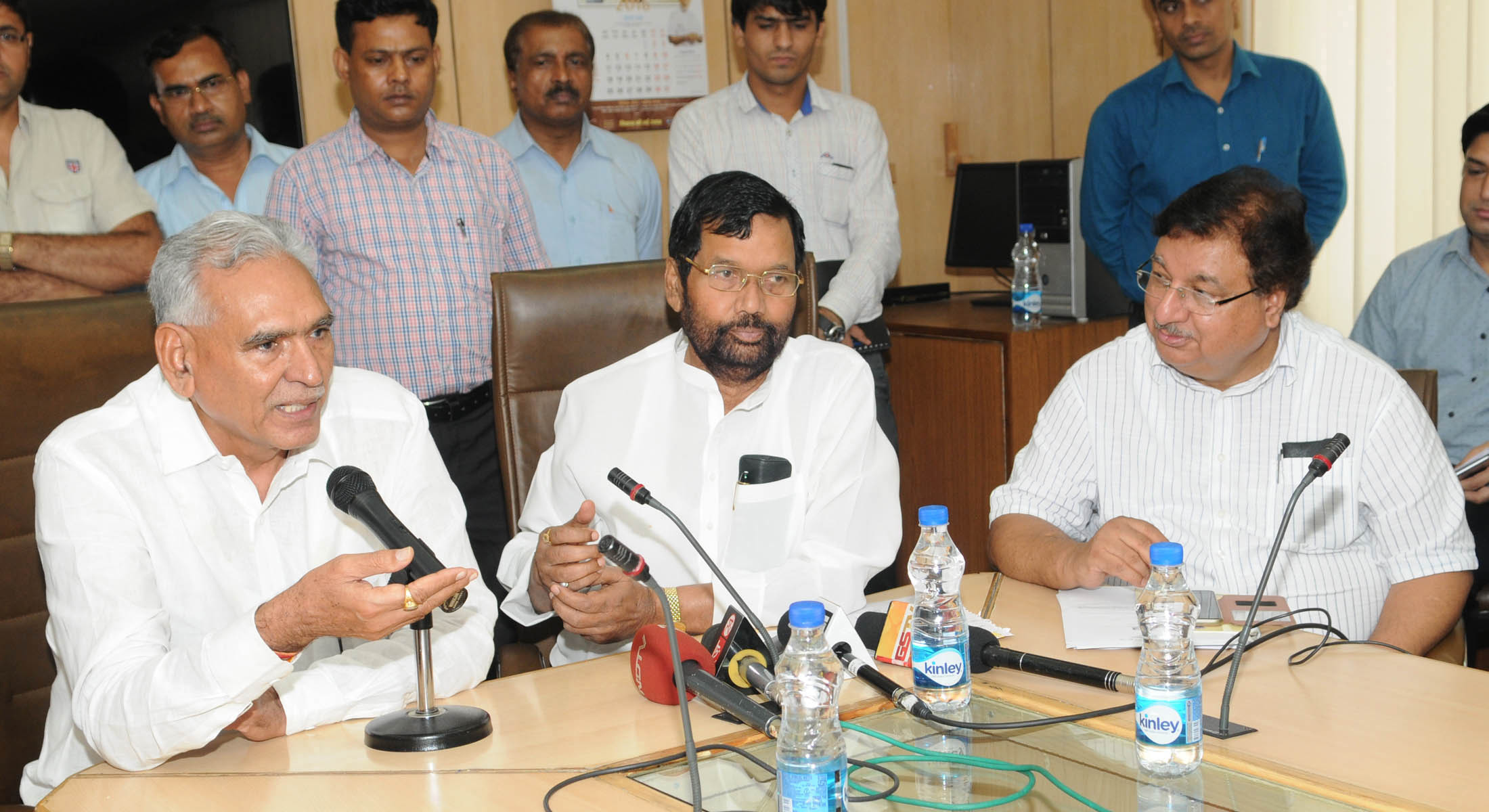
CR Chaudhary with Minister of Consumer Affair Food and Public Distribution Mr Ramvilas Paswan.

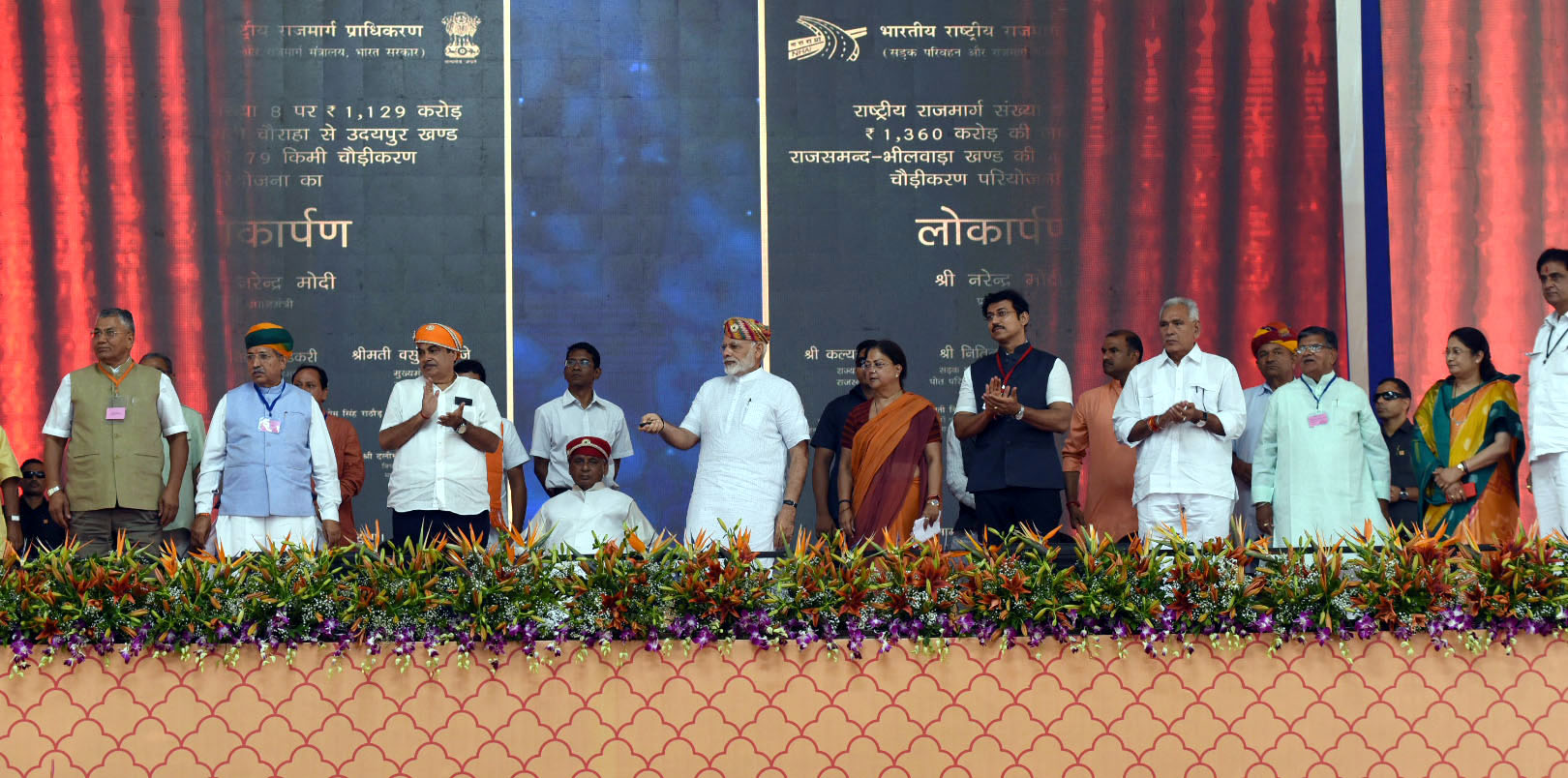
The Prime Minister, Shri Narendra Modi inaugurating and laying the foundation stone of several major highway projects, at Udaipur, in Rajasthan

His favorite pastimes include reading, writing, travelling, yoga and sports. He played volleyball at school, college and university level.

== Constituency works ==
=== Connectivity ===
==== Starting Makrana Parbatsar Railway Service ====
The railway line was closed for the past 23 years. The rail line started on 19 January 2016. A provision of Rs 968 Crore has been made in the budget for survey and construction of railway line from Parbatsar to Kishangarh.

==== Railway Bridge Construction as crossing C-61 and C-64 ====
An allocation of Rs 26 Crore and Rs 29.23 Crore has been made for long pending demand.

==== Railway Bridge Connectivity at Nawan ====
For Construction of Railway Bridge (Over Bridge Number 21) near Nawan Railway Station an allocation of Rs 33 Crore was approved.

==== Doubling of Phulera (Jaipur) to Degana (Nagaur) Railway Line ====
The inauguration of railway line was done on 9 December 2017 at Borawad Makrana by Mr. Rajen Gohain MoS, Railway ministry, GOI. A sum of Rs 611.53 Crore was sanctioned for this project.

==== Installation of benches at Railway Stations in Nagaur ====
A total of 138 benches at a cost of Rs 14 Lakhs have been installed in different railway stations of Nagaur for comfort of passengers.

=== Education and sports ===
==== Indoor Stadium Construction ====
An allocation of Rs 85 Lakh was made for construction of indoor stadium. The stadium was inaugurated on 18 September 2015. Also, an allocation of Rs 11 Crore was made for development of sports facility at Nagaur, Khimasar, Makrana and Deedwana.

==== Construction of Toilets in Schools ====
Under Swachh Bharat Abhiyaan all the Secondary and Higher Secondary Schools were inspected. A total of 40 Government schools which did not have toilets were sanctioned Rs 76 Lakh in 2014-15 out of MP Fund for the first time.

==== Opening of Kendriya Vidyalaya ====
A long pending demand of the city was quality education. The demand of Kendriya Vidyalaya was accepted on 12.05.2017 and 37.5 Bigha of land was allotted for it. The school was started on 25.07.2018 from class I to class VI with total strength of 248.

=== Financial Inclusion, Governance and Tourism ===
==== Banking ====
A total of 42 Bank Branches have been opened in last 4 years in various villages paving way for financial inclusion.

==== Tourism ====
To develop Nagaur as a tourism hub sanction of rs 15 lakh from MPLAD was made. Under this Veer Tejaji Panaroma Kharnal, Guru Jameshwar Panorama Peepasar, Amarsingh Rathore Panorama have been made.

==== Safety ====
For installation of CCTV and help desk a total of Rs 750 Lakhs were sanctioned from PMLAD Funds.

==== Passport Office ====
A passport office was opened on 24 February 2018 in the city. More than 1000 passports have been issued in 2 months.

== Gallery ==
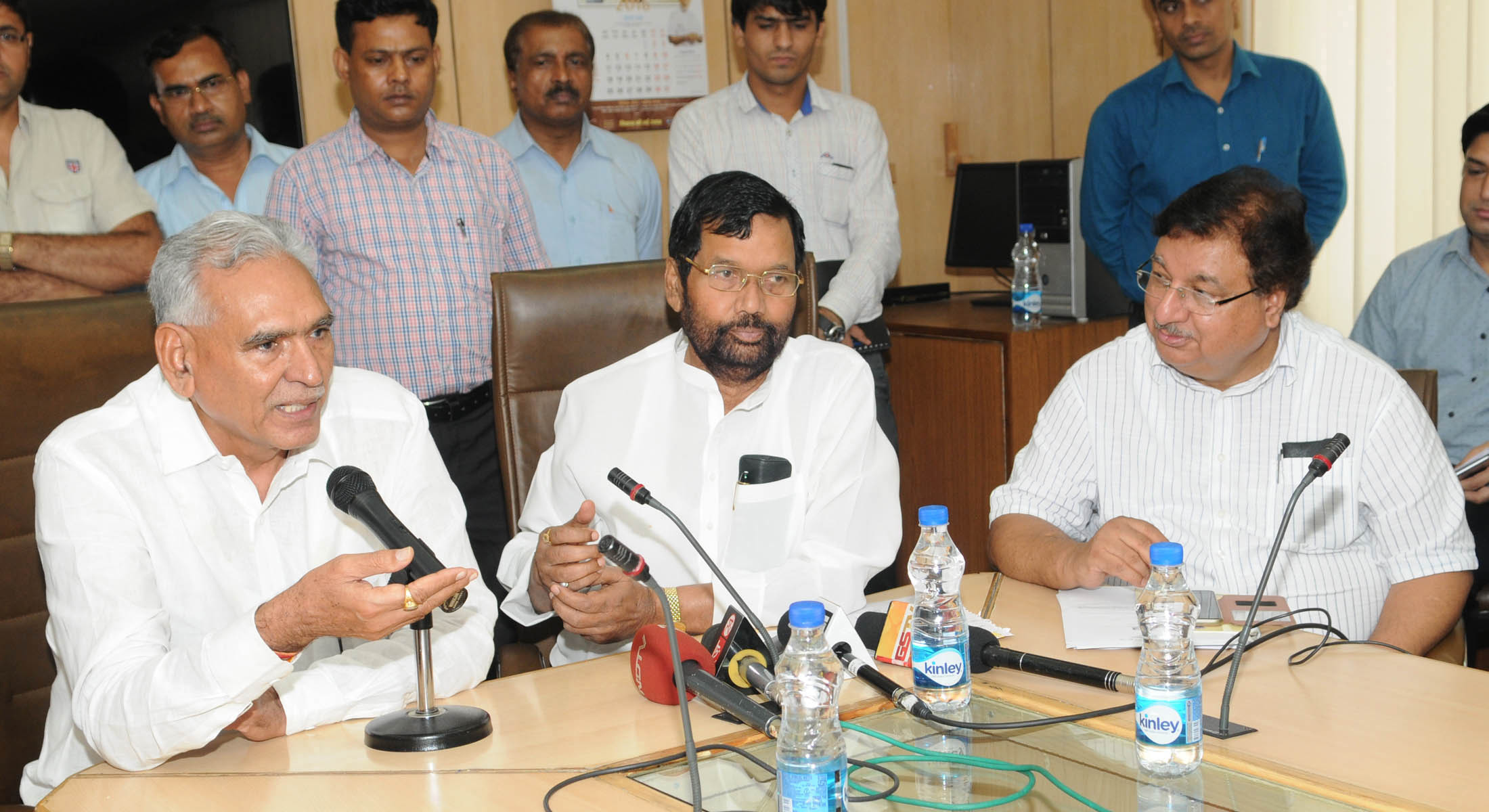

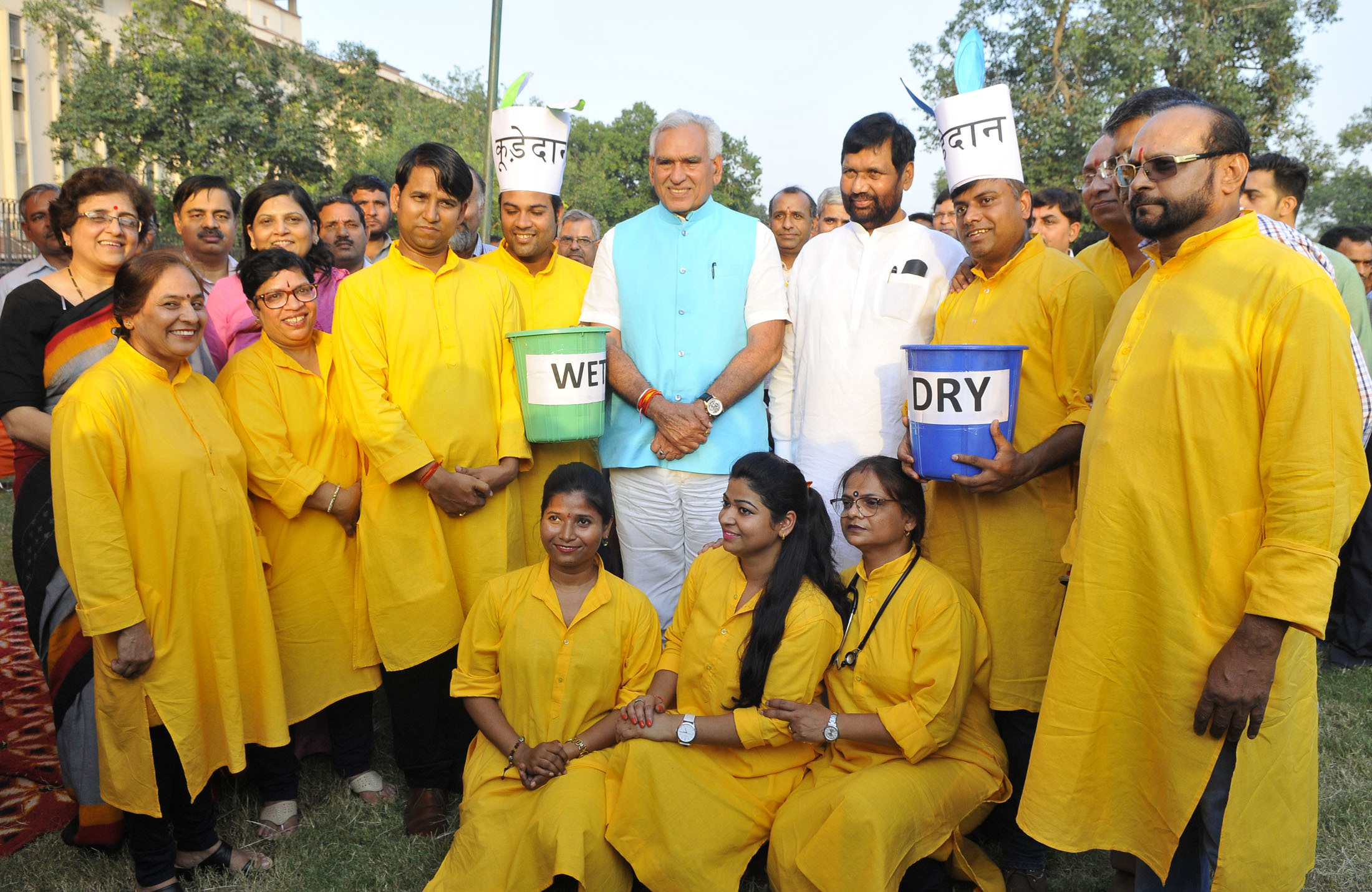

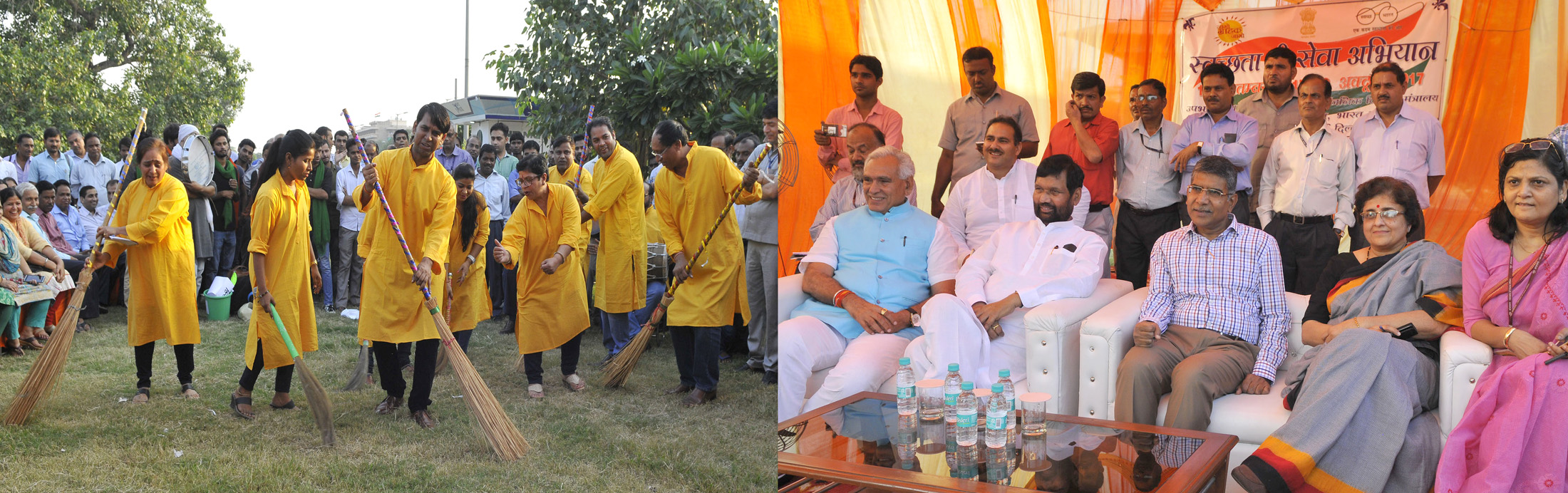

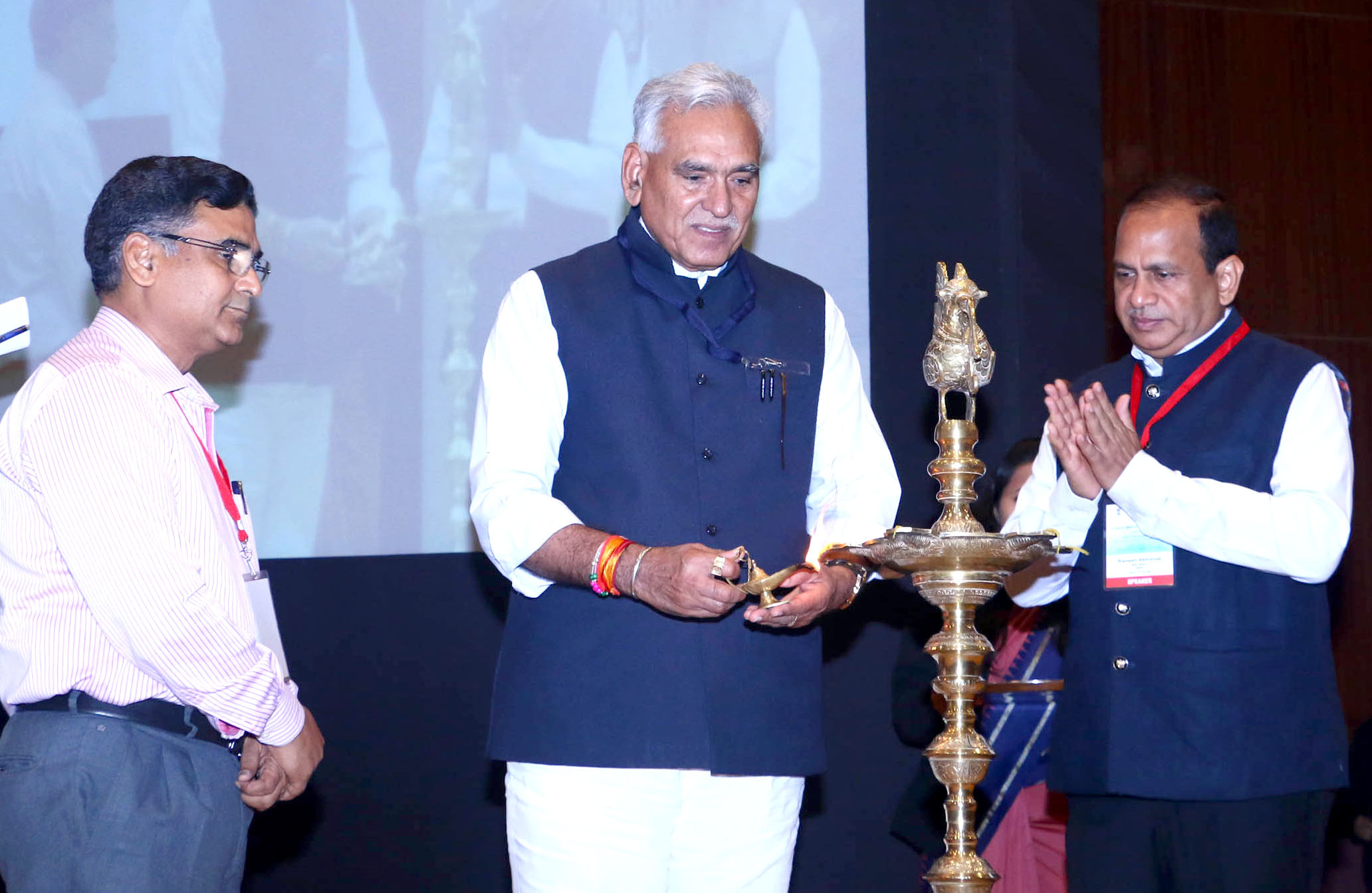

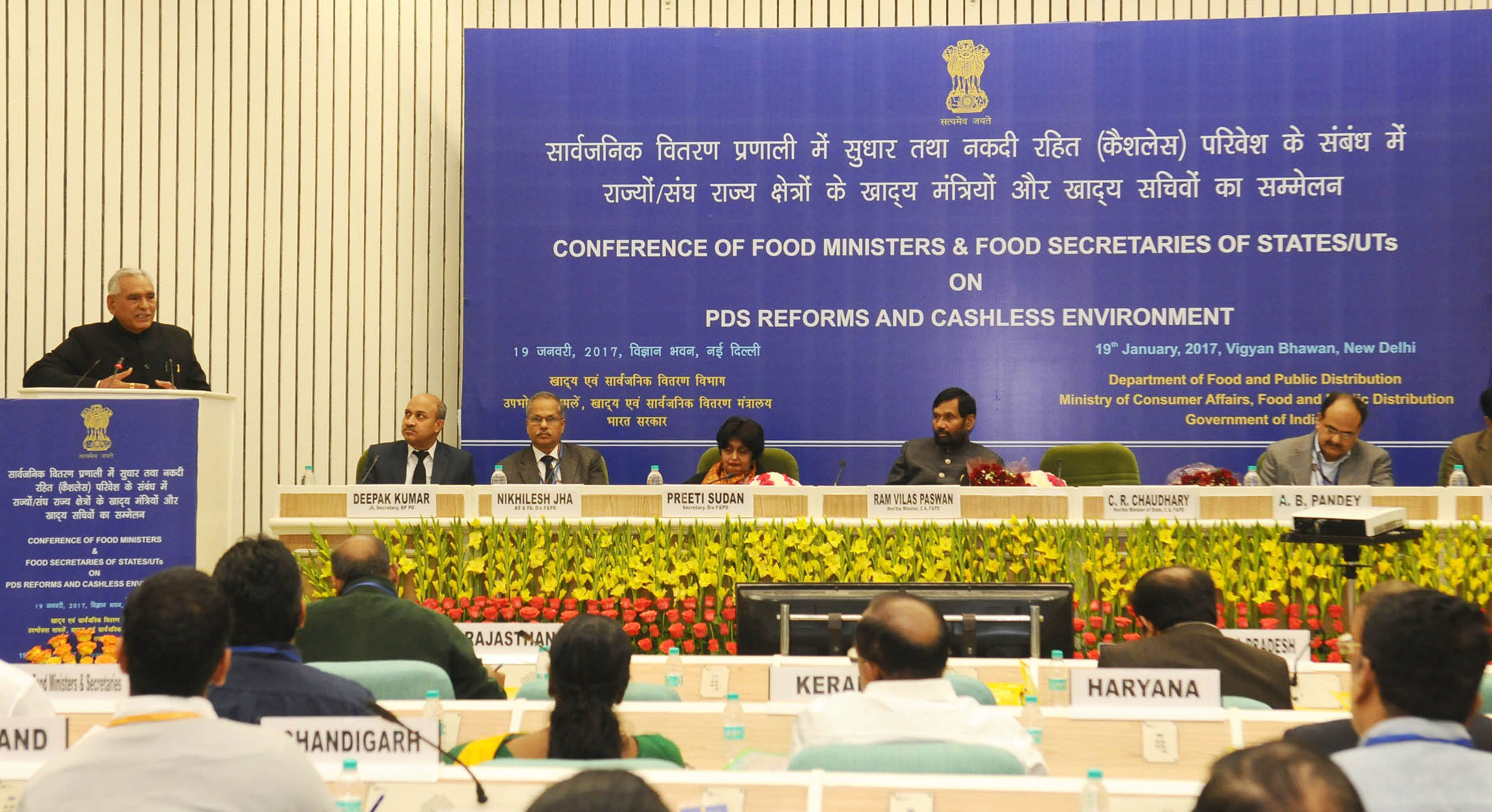

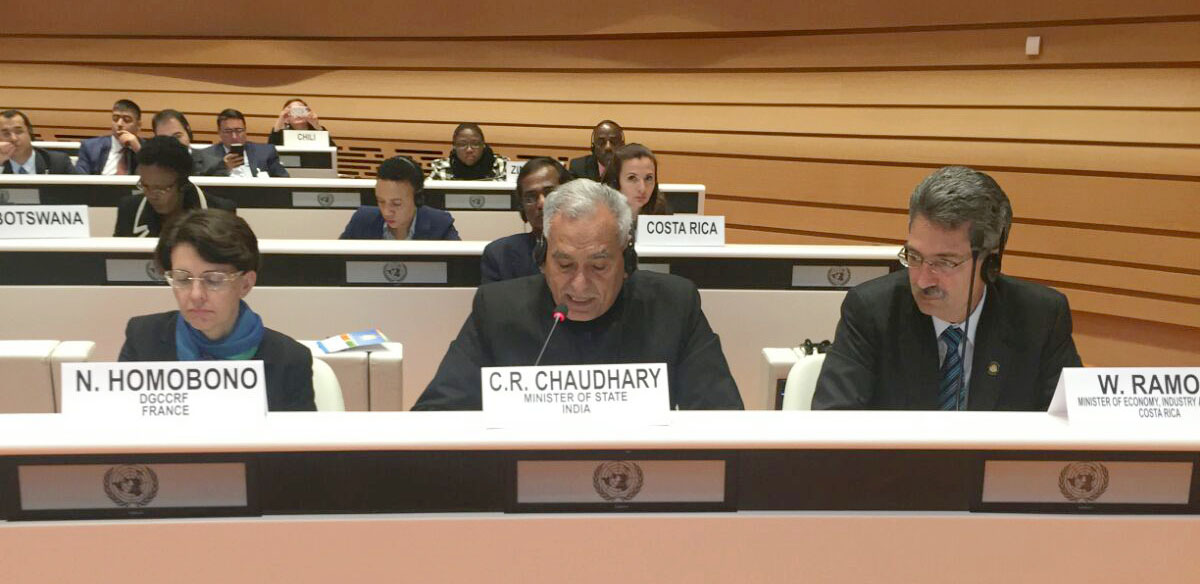

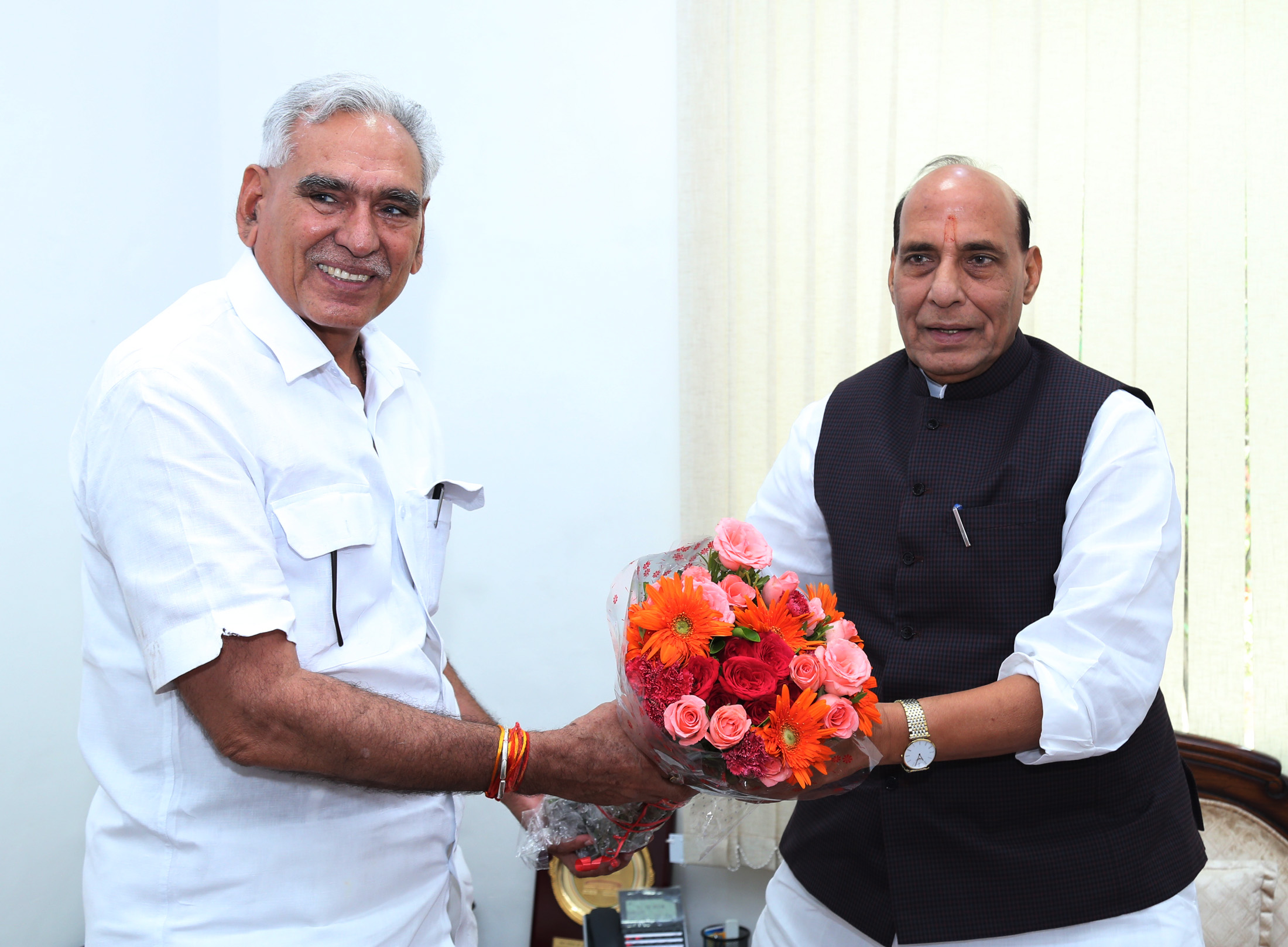
