= Deedwana Assembly constituency =

Constituency of the Rajasthan legislative assembly in India

Coordinates: 27.40°N 74.58°E

Deedwana
- Constituency No. 107 for the Rajasthan Legislative Assembly

Constituency details
- Country: India
- Region: North India
- State: Rajasthan
- District: Nagaur
- Established: 1951
- Reservation: None

Member of Legislative Assembly
- 16th Rajasthan Legislative Assembly
- Incumbent Yunus Khan
- Party: Independent
- Elected year: 2023

Deedwana Assembly Constituency is one of the constituencies of the Rajasthan Legislative Assembly in Nagaur. Yunus Khan is the MLA.

== Members of the Legislative Assembly ==
Year	Name	Party
1951	Mathura Das	Indian National Congress
1957	Moti Lal	Indian National Congress
1962	Moti Lal	Indian National Congress
1967	M. D. Mathur	Indian National Congress
1972	Bhomaram	Swatantra Party
1977	Mathura Das	Indian National Congress
1980	Umed Singh	Janata Party
1985	Bhanwara Ram	Indian National Congress
1990	Ummed Singh	Janata Dal
1993	Chena Ram	Independent politician
1998	Rupa Ram Dudi	Indian National Congress
2003	Yunus Khan	Bharatiya Janata Party
2008	Rupa Ram Dudi	Indian National Congress
2013	Yunus Khan	Bharatiya Janata Party
2018	Chetan Dudi	Indian National Congress
2023	Yunus Khan	Independent

== Election results ==
=== 2023 ===
2023 Rajasthan Legislative Assembly election: Deedwana
Party	Candidate	Votes	%	±%
Independent	Yunus Khan	70,952	36.21	
INC	Chetan Dudi	68,560	34.99	−21.02
BJP	Jitendra Singh Jodha	48,814	24.91	−6.64
AAP	Ramniwas Royal	2,516	1.28	−3.04
NOTA	None of the above	1,778	0.91	+0.0
Majority		2,392	1.22	−23.24
Turnout		195,933	73.7	+2.16
Independent gain from INC		Swing		

=== 2018 ===
2018 Rajasthan Legislative Assembly election: Deedwana
Party	Candidate	Votes	%	±%
INC	Chetan Dudi	92,981	56.01	
BJP	Jitendra Singh	52,379	31.55	
AAP	Hakeem Khan	7,177	4.32	
Independent	Raju Ram	3,339	2.01	
Independent	Mangej Singh	3,101	1.87	
BSP	Ganesha Ram	2,748	1.66	
Independent	Sher Singh	1,499	0.9	
NOTA	None of the above	1,506	0.91	
Majority		40,602	24.46	
Turnout		166,011	71.54	
INC gain from BJP		Swing		

=== 2013 ===
- Yunus Khan (BJP): 68,795
- Chetan Chaudhary (Chetan Dudi): 57,351
