= NH 162 Ext =

NH 162 Ext is a 250 km long highway starting from Pali and terminating at bhatewar located in Vallabhnagar tehsil of Udaipur district. It passes through Bhatewar, Mavli, Nathdwara, Haldighati, Kumbhalgarh, Desuri, Nadol, Marwar and Pali at NH 14.
