= Gajendra Singh Shaktawat =

Indian politician (1973–2021)

Member of the Rajasthan Legislative Assembly
- In office 2018–2021
- Preceded by: M. Randhir Singh Bhinder
- Constituency: Vallabhnagar

Personal details
- Born: 24 May 1973 Bhindar, Udaipur, India
- Died: 20 January 2021 (aged 47) Delhi, India
- Party: Indian National Congress
- Spouse: Preeti Singh Shaktawat
- Children: 3

Gajendra Singh Shaktawat (24 May 1973 – 20 January 2021) was an Indian politician and MLA from Vallabhnagar, Udaipur. He was the son of former home minister Gulab Singh Shaktawat.

== Early years ==
Shaktawat was the younger son of Late Shri Gulab Singh Shaktawat [ Former Home Minister in the Rajasthan Government]. He completed his schooling in Udaipur city, at St. Paul’s school Udaipur and graduated from Mohanlal Sukhadia University.

== Career ==
Shaktawat was a youth leader in his college days.He was elected as the Member of the Legislative Assembly from Vallabhnagar in 2008 and served as State Minister in the Gehlot Government in 2008 - 2013 and was re-elected as MLA for the second time in 2018 Vidhanshabha elections.

== Family ==
He was married to Preeti Jhala, daughter of Shrimati Bhagwati Jhala and Late Maharaj Anand Singh Jhala of Bari Sadri, Bhagwati Jhala was a prominent BJP leader. Bhagwati served as Vice President of BJP Rajasthan for four years. Shaktawat had two daughters and one son; Hiteshi Shaktawat [ Married to Lt. Commander Abhijeet Singh Bhati], Gaurvi Shaktawat and Vindhyaraj Singh Shaktawat.

== Death ==
Shaktawat died of COVID-19.
