= Indira Devi Bawari =

Indian politician

Member, Rajasthan Legislative Assembly
- In office 2018–2023
- Preceded by: Sukharam Netdiya
- Succeeded by: Laxmanram Meghwal
- Constituency: Merta, Rajasthan

Personal details
- Born: 1 October 1987 (age 38) Merta City, Rajasthan, India
- Party: Rashtriya Loktantrik Party
- Occupation: Politician

Indira Devi Bawri (born 1 October 1987) is an Indian politician. A member of the Rashtriya Loktantrik Party, Bawri served as the Member of the Rajasthan Legislative Assembly representing Merta from 2018 to 2023. She also served as member of committee on welfare of Scheduled Castes in the Rajasthan Legislative Assembly.
