= Bhanu Prakash Mirdha =

Indian politician

Member of the 11th Lok Sabha
- Succeeded by: Ram Raghunath Chaudhary
- Constituency: Nagaur Lok Sabha constituency

Personal details
- Born: 27 March 1953; Nagaur, Rajasthan
- Political party: Bhartiya Janata Party
- Parent: Nathuram Mirdha (father)
- Education: B.A.
- Alma mater: Delhi University

Bhanu Prakash Mirdha (born 27 March 1953) is an Indian politician from Nagaur, Rajasthan. He is a former member of 11th Lok Sabha. In 1997, he was elected to the 11th Lok Sabha By-election from Nagaur constituency defeating his uncle Ram Niwas Mirdha.

== Early life and education ==
He was born on 27 March 1953 in Nagaur, Rajasthan to Nathuram Mirdha. He did Bachelor of Arts from Delhi University. He is agriculturist by profession. He is married to Smt. Indira Mirdha and has two sons.
