= Preeti Singh Shaktawat =

Indian politician (born 1973)

Preeti Gajendra Singh Shaktawat

Member of the Rajasthan Legislative Assembly
- Incumbent
- Assumed office November 2021
- Preceded by: Gajendra Singh Shaktawat
- Constituency: Vallabhnagar

Personal details
- Party: Indian National Congress
- Spouse: Gajendra Singh Shaktawat
- Occupation: Politician

Preeti Singh Shaktawat is an Indian politician and member of the Indian National Congress. She is a member of the Rajasthan Legislative Assembly from the Vallabhnagar constituency in Udaipur district.
