= Gordhan =

Gordhan is a name. It can be both a surname and a masculine given name. Notable people with this name include:

== As a surname ==
- Pravin Gordhan (1949–2024), South African politician
- Sheila Gordhan, vocalist for the 2015 song Smile

== As a given name ==
- Gordhan Verma, Indian politician
- Gordhan Zadafia (born 1954), Indian politician
