= Rewant Ram Danga =

Indian politician

Member of the Rajasthan Legislative Assembly
- Incumbent
- Assumed office 23 November 2024
- Preceded by: Hanuman Beniwal
- Constituency: Khinwsar

Personal details
- Party: Bharatiya Janata Party (2023 - present)
- Other political affiliations: Rashtriya Loktantrik Party (before 2023)
- Spouse: Geeta Devi
- Profession: Politician

Rewant Ram Danga is an Indian politician. He is a member of the Rajasthan Legislative Assembly representing Khinvsar, Nagaur as a member of the Bharatiya Janata Party.

== Political career ==
Danga began his political career with the Rashtriya Loktantrik Party but joined the Bharatiya Janta Party ahead of the 2023 Rajasthan Assembly elections and was a BJP candidate from Khinwsar. He lost the 2023 Rajasthan assembly election to Hanuman Beniwal by a margin of 2,059 votes. He won the bypoll in 2024 by a margin of 13,870 votes to become MLA again. In December 2025, he was caught behind camera asking for 40% bribe for development projects under the Member of Legislative Assembly Local Area Development Fund scheme.
