= Khinwsar Assembly constituency =

Legislative Assembly constituency in Rajasthan State, India

Coordinates: 26.99°N 73.4°E

Khinvsar
- Constituency No. 110 for the Rajasthan Legislative Assembly

Constituency details
- Country: India
- Region: North India
- State: Rajasthan
- District: Nagaur
- Lok Sabha constituency: Nagaur
- Established: 2008
- Total electors: 283,052
- Reservation: None

Member of Legislative Assembly
- 16th Rajasthan Legislative Assembly
- Incumbent Rewant Ram Danga
- Party: Bharatiya Janata Party
- Elected year: 2024

Khinvsar Assembly constituency is one of the 200 Legislative Assembly constituencies of Rajasthan state in India. It is in Nagaur district and is a part of Nagaur Lok Sabha constituency.

== Members of the Legislative Assembly ==
Election	Member	Party
2008	Hanuman Beniwal	Bharatiya Janata Party
2013	Hanuman Beniwal	Independent
2018	Hanuman Beniwal	Rashtriya Loktantrik Party
2019^	Narayan Beniwal	Rashtriya Loktantrik Party
2023	Hanuman Beniwal	Rashtriya Loktantrik Party
2024^	Rewant Ram Danga	Bharatiya Janata Party

^By-Poll

== Election results ==
=== 2008 ===
2008 Rajasthan Legislative Assembly election: Khinwsar
Party	Candidate	Votes	%	Result
BJP	Hanuman Beniwal	58,760	45.3	Won
INC	Sahdev	17,150	13.2	Lost
Independent	Hari Ram	2,925	2.3	Lost
BSP	Durg Singh	34,317	26.5	Lost
Independent	Bhagirth	11,918	9.2	Lost

=== 2013 ===
2013 Rajasthan Legislative Assembly election: Khinwsar
Party	Candidate	Votes	%	Result
Independent	Hanuman Beniwal	65,399	43.3	Won
INC	Rajendra	9,257	6.1	Lost
BJP	Bhagirth	28,510	18.9	Lost
BSP	Durg Singh	42,379	28.1	Lost
Independent	Jaita Ram	530	0.4	Lost

=== 2018 ===
2018 Rajasthan Legislative Assembly election: Khinwsar
Party	Candidate	Votes	%	Result
RLP	Hanuman Beniwal	83,096	45.2	Won
INC	Savai Singh Chaudhary	66,148	36.0	Lost
BJP	Ramchandra	26,809	14.6	Lost
BSP	Rampal Meghwanshi	1,181	0.6	Lost
Independent	Dr Anita	2,279	1.2	Lost

=== 2023 ===
2023 Rajasthan Legislative Assembly election: Khinwsar
Party	Candidate	Votes	%	±%
RLP	Hanuman Beniwal	79,492	37.97	−6.68
BJP	Rewant Ram Danga	77,433	36.99	+22.59
INC	Tejpal Mirdha	27,763	13.26	−22.28
Independent	Durg Singh	15,872	7.58	
NOTA	None of the above	2,130	1.02	−0.24
Majority		2,059	0.98	−8.13
Turnout		209,361	73.97	−1.56
RLP hold		Swing		

=== 2024 bypoll ===
Rajasthan Legislative Assembly by-election, 2024: Khinwasar
Party	Candidate	Votes	%	±%
BJP	Rewant Ram Danga	108,402	50.06	+13.07
RLP	Kanika Beniwal	94,532	43.65	+5.68
INC	Ratan Choudhary	5,434	2.51	−10.75
NOTA	None of the Above	2,155	1.00	−0.02
Majority		13,870	6.41	+5.43
Turnout		216,549	N/A	
BJP gain from RLP		Swing		

== See also ==
- Khinvsar
- Nagaur district
- List of constituencies of Rajasthan Legislative Assembly
