= Mathura Das Mathur =

Indian politician

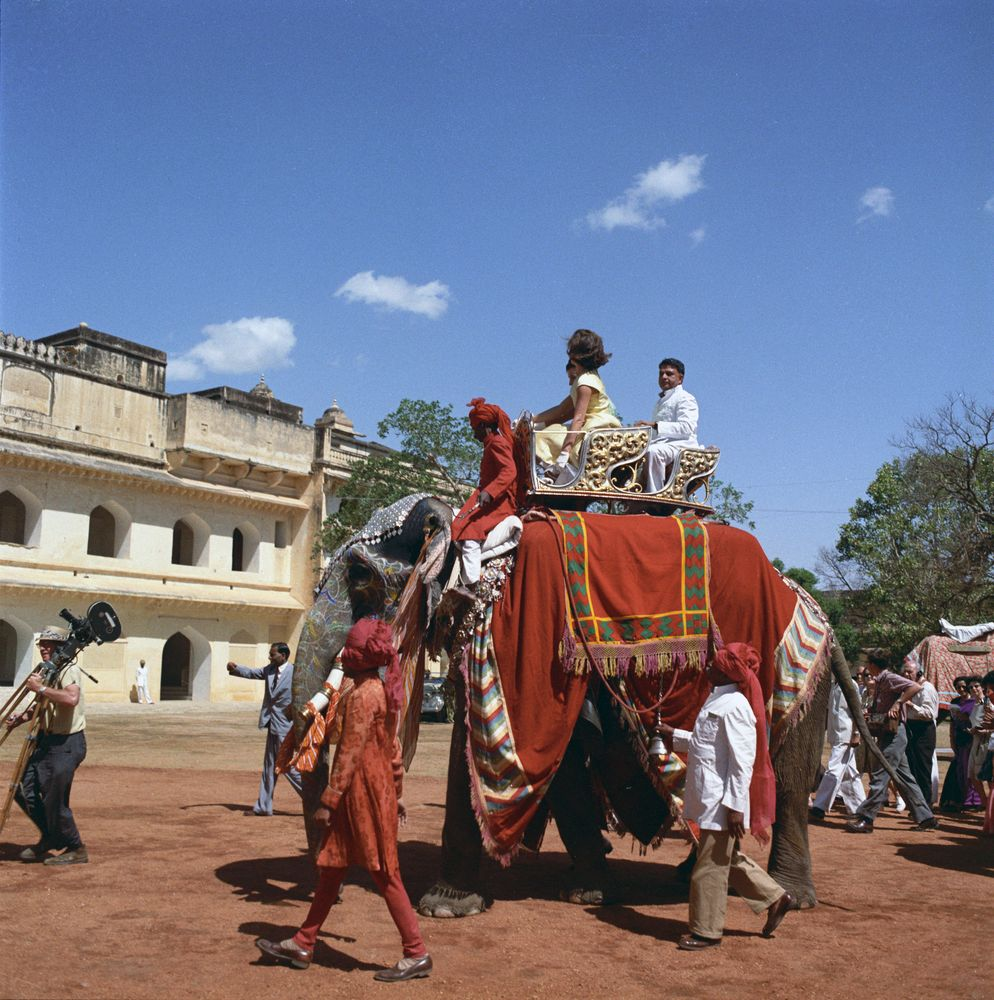
- Mathur, sitting behind U.S. First Lady Jacqueline Kennedy on an elephant in the courtyard of Amber Palace in Jaipur, 19 March 1962.
- Born: 6 September 1918; Rajasthan, India
- Died: 14 April 1993 (age 75)

Mathura Das Mathur (6 September 1918 – 14 April 1993) was an Indian politician from Rajasthan. He was born at Jodhpur and studied at Lucknow University. He joined Indian National Congress. In 1948, he became the Health and Education minister of the first government of Marwar state. He was elected to the 2nd Lok Sabha from Nagaur in 1957. He was the Home Minister in the Rajasthan government from 1962 to 1967. He was the First Chief Whip in the Rajasthan Legislative Assembly from 1952 to 1957.

In honor of Mathuradas Mathur, the Rajasthan government presents the "Mathuradas Mathur Award" every year to talented cricketers from the region.
