= Chetan Dudi =

Indian politician

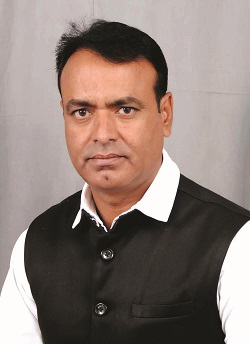

15th Rajasthan Assembly
- In office 11 December 2018 – 3 December 2023
- Preceded by: Yunus Khan
- Succeeded by: Yunus Khan
- Constituency: Deedwana

Personal details
- Born: 4 July 1979 (age 46) Nagaur, Rajasthan, India
- Party: Indian National Congress
- Children: 2
- Parent: Rooparam Dudi (father)
- Education: Delhi University (BA, LLB)
- Occupation: Advocate

Chetan Singh Choudhary (born 4 July 1979), also known as Chetan Dudi, is an Indian politician from Rajasthan. He is a member of the Indian National Congress. He was elected to the 15th Rajasthan Legislative Assembly in 2018 from district headquarters Deedwana.

== Political career ==
Dudi began his political career in late 2009, and was elected president of Nagaur Youth Congress that November. He was elected to the same position for the second time in February 2013.

Dudi contested and won the Member of Legislative Assembly election from Deedwana constituency in 2018 with 92,981 (56.01%) votes. He defeated Jintendra Singh of Bharatiya Janata Party.

He was State Secretary of Rajasthan Congress from 22 December 2014 to July 2020.
