= Ramdev Beniwal =

Indian politician

MLA
- Constituency: Mundwa Assembly constituency

Personal details
- Born: Nagaur ,Rajasthan

Ramdev Beniwal was an Indian politician Mundwa Assembly constituency from Nagaur District, Rajasthan State.

He was two term Member of MLA in Rajasthan in 1977 and 1985. His sons are MP Hanuman Beniwal and MLA Narayan Beniwal.
