= Mundwa Assembly constituency =

Former Legislative Assembly constituency in Rajasthan, India

Mundwa
- Former constituency for the Rajasthan Legislative Assembly

Constituency details
- Country: India
- Region: North India
- State: Rajasthan
- District: Nagaur
- Lok Sabha constituency: Nagaur
- Established: 1977
- Abolished: 2008
- Reservation: None

Mundwa is a former constituency of the Rajasthan Legislative Assembly. It existed from 1977 to 2008.

== Members of the Legislative Assembly ==
Year	Member	Party
1977	Ramdev Beniwal	Indian National Congress
1980	Harendra Mirdha	Indian National Congress
1985	Ramdev Beniwal	Lokdal
1990	Habibur Rahman	Indian National Congress
1993	Habibur Rahman	Indian National Congress
1998	Habibur Rahman	Indian National Congress
2003	Usha Poonia	Bharatiya Janata Party

== See also ==
- Nagaur district
