= Bhanwar Singh Dangawas =

Indian politician

Member of parliament, Lok Sabha
- In office 2004 – 2009
- Preceded by: Ram Raghunath Choudhary
- Succeeded by: Jyoti Mirdha
- Constituency: Nagaur

Personal details
- Born: 7 June 1929 Nagaur, Rajasthan, India
- Died: 2 July 2012 (aged 83) Dangawas, Merta City, Nagaur, Rajasthan, India
- Party: BJP
- Spouse: Sugni Devi
- Children: 4 Son's
- As of 14 September, 2006

Bhanwar Singh Dangawas (7 June 1929 – 2 July 2012) was a member of the 14th Lok Sabha from 2004 to 2009 representing the Nagaur Constituency of Rajasthan. During that time he was a member of the Bharatiya Janata Party (BJP) political party. Shri Dangawas was also a member of Rajasthan Legislative Assembly during 1993 to 1998 and 2003 to 2004. He was Minister of State for Home Affairs in the Government of Rajasthan in 1998. An able parliamentarian, Shri Dangawas served as a member of Standing Committee on Water Resources during 2007 to 2009. Shri Dangawas had been honoured by the President of India with Police Medals for gallantry and for distinguished and meritorious Police Service. Shri Bhanwar Singh Dangawas died on 2 July 2012 at the age of 83.
