= Rashtriya Loktantrik Party =

Political party in India

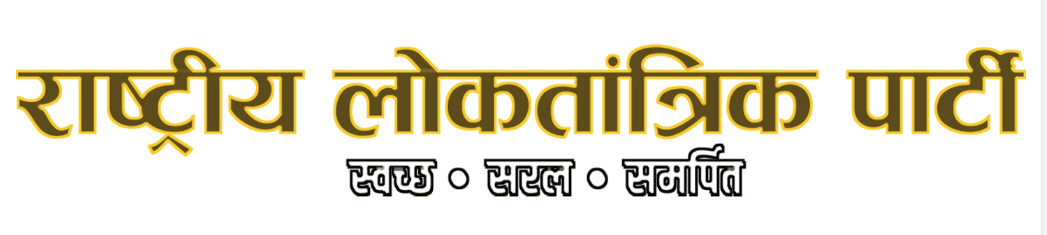
- Abbreviation: RLP
- Leader: Hanuman Beniwal
- President: Hanuman Beniwal
- Secretary: Narayan Beniwal
- Founded: 29 October 2018
- Headquarters: Jaipur
- Ideology: Jat caste mobilization
- Colours: Green Yellow
- ECI status: State party
- Alliance: INDIA (2024–present); NDA (2019–20)
- Seats in Rajya Sabha: 0 / 245
- Seats in Lok Sabha: 1 / 543
- Seats in Rajasthan Legislative Assembly: 0 / 200

Election symbol

Website
- https://rlpindia.org

The Rashtriya Loktantrik Party (RLP; lit. 'National Democratic Party') is a recognised Indian political party in the state of Rajasthan. It is the third political party of Rajasthan after the Indian National Congress and the Bharatiya Janata Party. RLP was founded by Hanuman Beniwal on 29 October 2018, with the aim of addressing the regional issues, particularly of the farmer community and youths.

== History ==
Hanuman Beniwal was initially exposed to politics due to his family political background, as his father, Ramdev Beniwal, was elected to the Rajasthan Legislative Assembly. He then became president of the student union of the Rajasthan University which marked his step into the politics.

Hanuman Beniwal was elected to the Rajasthan Legislative Assembly for first time in 2008 as a member of the Bharatiya Janata Party. In 2013, Beniwal's persistent claims against prominent party leaders, such as Rajendra Rathore and Vasundhara Raje, led to his suspension from the Bharatiya Janata Party (BJP). According to Beniwal, they were thoroughly corrupt, and there was a corrupt relationship between Raje and Ashok Gehlot, the chief minister at that time.

Hanuman Beniwal successfully organised five Kisan Hunkar Maha Rallies in Nagaur, Barmer, Bikaner, Sikar, Jaipur and this rally aimed at addressing the grievances of farmers in Rajasthan and the focused on issues such as loan waivers, fair prices for crops and better irrigation facilities for farmers of Rajasthan and launched a political party called Rashtriya Loktantrik Party with an election symbol of "Bottle" in Jaipur on 29 October 2018. The Kisan Hunkar rally was supported by some political leaders such as, Ghanshyam Tiwari, Jayant Chaudhary and Sanjay Lathar.

RLP party received support from the farmer community, and was able to have its representatives elected on three seats of the Rajasthan legislative assembly in 2018. In 2019, the Rashtriya Loktantrik Party entered into an alliance with the Bharatiya Janata Party before the 2019 Indian general election. RLP contested on the Nagaur seat and extended support to the Bharatiya Janata Party on all other seats of the state.

Hanuman Beniwal who had contested from the Nagaur seat was elected to the Lok Sabha in 2019. Following the passage of the 2020 Indian agriculture acts, Beniwal resigned from three parliamentary committees, and the party extended its support to the Indian farmers' protest and supported the 2020 Indian general strike. On 26 December 2020, Rashtriya Loktantrik Party quit NDA alliance in 2020-21 farmers protest to three farmer laws and the party said them as Anti-farmer laws.

On 27 October 2023, the Rashtriya Loktantrik Party announced their alliance with Chandra Shekhar Ravan's Azad Samaj Party for the 2023 Rajasthan Assembly elections.

Following 2024 Indian general elections, the Rashtriya Loktantrik Party announced their alliance with INDIA bloc to protect the democratic system in country. Hanuman Beniwal was announced as the candidate of INDIA bloc from Nagaur on 25 March 2024.

On 11 January 2025, the Rashtriya Loktantrik Party announced their alliance with Aam Admi Party for the 2025 Delhi Legislative Assembly elections and also supported the Arvind Kejriwal demand to include the Jats across the country into the central list of OBC.

== Electoral performance ==
Lok sabha election results
Year	Lok sabha	Party leader	Pre-poll alliance	Seats contested	Seats won	Change in seats	Total votes	Overall vote %	Vote swing	Outcome	Ref.
2019	17th	Hanuman Beniwal	NDA	1	1 / 543	▲1				Government Later Opposition	
2024	18th	Hanuman Beniwal	INDIA	1	1 / 543	Steady				Opposition	

State assembly election results
Year	Party leader	Pre-poll alliance	Seats contested	Seats won	Change in seats	Total votes	Overall vote %	Vote swing	Outcome
Rajasthan
2018	Hanuman Beniwal	none	58	3 / 200	▲3	856,038	2.40%	▲2.40	Opposition
2023	Hanuman Beniwal	ASP(KR)+	78	1 / 200	▼2	946,209	2.38%	▼0.02	Opposition

== Members of Parliament ==
Year	Map	Lok Sabha	MP	Portrait	Constituency	Margin
2019		17th Lok Sabha	Hanuman Beniwal		Nagaur Lok Sabha constituency	1,81,260
2024		18th Lok Sabha	Hanuman Beniwal		Nagaur Lok Sabha constituency	42,225

== Members of Legislative Assembly ==
Members of the Rajasthan Legislative Assembly
Year	Name	Constituency	Margin
2018	Indira Devi	Merta	12,835
2018	Pukhraj Garg	Bhopalgarh	4,962
2018	Hanuman Beniwal	Khinwsar	16,948
2019 By-election	Narayan Beniwal	Khinwsar	4,680
2023	Hanuman Beniwal	Khinwsar	2,059

== See also ==
- List of political parties in India
