= Narayan Beniwal =

Indian politician

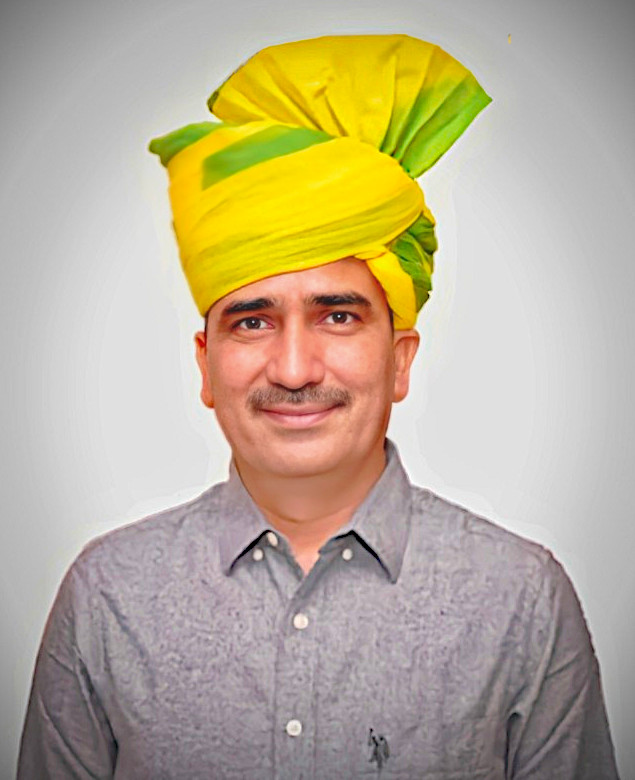

Member of the Rajasthan Legislative Assembly
- In office 24 October 2019 – 2 December 2023
- Preceded by: Hanuman Beniwal
- Succeeded by: Hanuman Beniwal
- Constituency: Khinwasar

Personal details
- Born: 11 July 1975 (age 50) Barangaon, Nagaur district, Rajasthan, India
- Party: Rashtriya Loktantrik Party
- Spouse: Sumesh Beniwal (m. 2000)
- Children: 1
- Parent: Ramdev Beniwal
- Relatives: Hanuman Beniwal (brother)

Narayan Beniwal (born 11 July 1975) is an Indian politician. He was elected to the Rajasthan Legislative Assembly from Khinwasar on 24 October 2019 in by poll elections. He is member of the Rastriya Loktantrik Party. He is younger brother of Hanuman Beniwal.

== Early life and education ==
Beniwal was born on 11 July 1975, to Ramdev Beniwal and Mohini Devi, in Barangaon village of Nagaur district in Rajasthan. He graduated with a Bachelor of Science degree from Rajasthan University. He is younger brother of RLP leader Hanuman Beniwal.

== Personal life ==
He married Dr Sumesh Beniwal on 14 April 2000; The couple had a child.
