= Laxmanram Meghwal =

Indian politician

Member of the Rajasthan Legislative Assembly
- Incumbent
- Assumed office 3 December 2023
- Preceded by: Indira Devi
- Constituency: Merta

Personal details
- Born: 1 January 1973 (age 53) Kalru, Merta City, Nagaur, Rajasthan
- Party: Bharatiya Janata Party (2019–present)
- Other political affiliations: Indian National Congress
- Spouse: Santosh Devi Meghwal
- Children: 2
- Occupation: Politician

Laxmanram Meghwal (1 January 1973) is an Indian politician currently serving as Member of the 16th Rajasthan Legislative Assembly from Merta in Nagaur district. He is a Member of the Bhartiya Janta Party.

== Career ==
Following the 2023 Rajasthan Legislative Assembly election, he was elected as MLA from the Merta assembly constituency, defeating Shivratan (chiman Valmiki) the candidate from the Indian National Congress (INC).
