= Jyoti Mirdha =

Indian politician

Member of the Parliament, Lok Sabha
- In office 16 May 2009 — 17 May 2014
- Preceded by: Bhanwar Singh Dangawas
- Succeeded by: C. R. Chaudhary
- Constituency: Nagaur

Personal details
- Born: 26 July 1972 (age 53) New Delhi
- Party: Bharatiya Janata Party
- Other political affiliations: Indian National Congress (till 2023)
- Spouse: Narender Gehlaut
- Children: 1
- Education: Bachelor of Medicine, Bachelor of Surgery
- Alma mater: Sawai Man Singh Medical College

Jyoti Mirdha (born 26 July 1972) is an Indian politician. She was elected to the 15th Lok Sabha from Nagaur Lok Sabha constituency as a member of the Indian National Congress. She is a member of Bharatiya Janata Party since September 2023.

== Career ==
Mirdha represented the Nagaur Lok Sabha constituency in the 15th Lok Sabha. She won the seat with 6,10,003 votes. During these elections she was member of Indian National Congress.
