= Yunus Khan (politician) =

Indian politician (born 1964)

Member of the Rajasthan Legislative Assembly
- In office 2003 - 2008
- Constituency: Deedwana
- In office 2013 - 2018
- Constituency: Deedwana
- Incumbent
- Assumed office December 2023
- Constituency: Deedwana

Personal details
- Born: 1 August 1964 (age 62)
- Party: Bharatiya Janata Party

Yunus Khan (born 1 August 1964), also known as Yoonus Khan, is an Indian politician belonging to the Bharatiya Janata Party. He was a cabinet minister in the government of Rajasthan under Vasundhara Raje ministry. He has been elected to the Rajasthan Legislative Assembly for third term in 2023, previously elected in 2003 and 2013 from Deedwana constituency.

== Personal life ==
Khan was born to Taju Khan. He is post graduate and did his Master of Commerce from Rajasthan University, Jaipur in 1986. Khan is a farmer by profession.

== Political career ==
In the 2018 Rajasthan Assembly election, Khan ran against Sachin Pilot from Tonk, and lost the election. Pilot received 109,040 votes and Khan received 54,861. In the Vidhan Sabha election of 2023, Khan left the BJP Party, ran as an independent candidate from the district headquarters Didwana, and won against the major political parties. He defeated Jeetendera Singh of BJP and Chetan Dudi of Indian National Congress.
