= Gulab Singh Shaktawat =

Gulab Singh Shaktawat was an Indian freedom fighter, social and political worker of Indian National Congress. A long serving MLA and a Minister in the Govt. of Rajasthan from Mewar region, Member PCC, Member AICC, remained Vice President of Rajasthan Congress.
