= 1993 Rajasthan Legislative Assembly election =

Election in Indian state

- 11 November 1993

All 199 seats in the Rajasthan Legislative Assembly 100 seats needed for a majority
- Registered: 28,340,937
- Turnout: 60.59% (▲3.5 %)
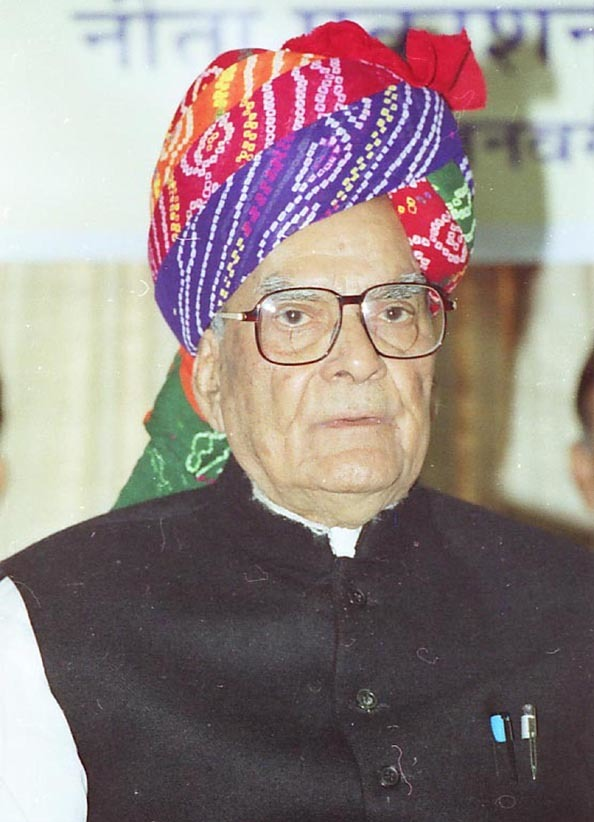

	Majority party	Minority party
Leader	Bhairon Singh Shekhawat
Party	BJP	INC
Leader's seat	Bali and Ganganagar lost
Last election	85	50
Seats won	95	76
Seat change	▲10	▲26
	Third party	Fourth party
		CPI(M)
Party	JD	CPI(M)
Last election	55	1
Seats won	6	1
Seat change	▼49	Steady
Chief Minister before election
Bhairon Singh Shekhawat
BJP
Elected Chief Minister
Bhairon Singh Shekhawat
BJP

Legislative Assembly elections were held in the Indian state of Rajasthan in 1993. The Bharatiya Janata Party (BJP) and Indian National Congress emerged as the two major political parties in this election. The election in Rajakhera Assembly constituency had to be postponed due to the death of BJP candidate Mahendra Singh. This election was held in 1994 and Manorama of the BJP won with 40,054 votes.

== Results ==
Party	Votes	%	Seats
Bharatiya Janata Party	6,498,330	38.60	95
Indian National Congress	6,442,721	38.27	76
Janata Dal	1,167,392	6.93	6
Communist Party of India (Marxist)	164,583	0.98	1
Others	390,173	2.32	0
Independents	2,171,870	12.90	21
Total	16,835,069	100.00	199
Valid votes	16,835,069	98.05	
Invalid/blank votes	334,696	1.95	
Total votes	17,169,765	100.00	
Registered voters/turnout	28,340,937	60.58	

== List of winners ==
Constituency	Reserved for (SC/ST/None)	Member	Party
Bhadra	None	Gyan Singh	Independent
Nohar	None	Ajay	Janata Dal
Tibi	SC	Shashi Dutt	Independent
Hanumangarh	None	Ram Pratap	Bharatiya Janata Party
Sangaria	None	Gurjant Singh	Independent
Ganganagar	None	Radheshyam Hardayal	Indian National Congress
Kesrisinghpur	SC	Hira Lal Indora	Indian National Congress
Karanpur	None	Jagtar Singh	Indian National Congress
Raisinghnagar	SC	Mulk Raj	Indian National Congress
Pilibanga	None	Ram Pratap Kasniya	Bharatiya Janata Party
Suratgarh	None	Amar Chand Middha	Bharatiya Janata Party
Lunkaransar	None	Bhim Sen Choudhary	Indian National Congress
Bikaner	None	Nandlal Vyas	Bharatiya Janata Party
Kolayat	None	Devi Singh Bhati	Bharatiya Janata Party
Nokha	SC	Rewat Ram	Bharatiya Janata Party
Dungargarh	None	Kishana Ram Nai	Bharatiya Janata Party
Sujangarh	SC	Rameshwar Lal Bhati	Bharatiya Janata Party
Ratangarh	None	Hari Shankar Bhabhara	Bharatiya Janata Party
Sardarshahar	None	Narendra Budania	Indian National Congress
Churu	None	Rajendra Rathore	Bharatiya Janata Party
Taranagar	None	Chandanmal Ved	Indian National Congress
Sadulpur	None	Indersingh Poonia	Indian National Congress
Pilani	None	Sharwan Kumar	Independent
Surajgarh	SC	Sunder Lal	Independent
Khetri	None	Jitendra Singh	Indian National Congress
Gudha	None	Shivnath Singh	Independent
Nawalgarh	None	Bhanwar Singh	Indian National Congress
Jhunjhunu	None	Sis Ram Ola	Indian National Congress
Mandawa	None	Ram Narain Choudhary	Indian National Congress
Fatehpur	None	Banwari Lal	Bharatiya Janata Party
Lachhmangarh	SC	Parasram	Indian National Congress
Sikar	None	Rejendra Pareek	Indian National Congress
Dhod	None	Amra Ram	Communist Party of India
Danta - Ramgarh	None	Narayan Singh	Indian National Congress
Srimadhopur	None	Deependra Singh Sekhawat	Indian National Congress
Khandela	None	Mahadeo Singh	Independent
Neem-ka-thana	None	Mohan Lal	Indian National Congress
Chomu	None	Ghanshyam Tiwari	Bharatiya Janata Party
Amber	None	Gopiram	Bharatiya Janata Party
Jaipur Rural	None	Ujala Arora	Bharatiya Janata Party
Hawamahal	None	Bhanwar Lal Sharma	Bharatiya Janata Party
Johribazar	None	Kalicharan Saraf	Bharatiya Janata Party
Kishanpole	None	Rameshwar Bharadwaj (murtikar)	Bharatiya Janata Party
Bani Park	None	Rajpal Singh Shekhawat	Bharatiya Janata Party
Phulera	None	Hari Singh	Indian National Congress
Dudu	SC	Babu Lal	Bharatiya Janata Party
Sanganer	None	Indira Mayaram	Indian National Congress
Phagi	SC	Laxminarayan Bairwa	Bharatiya Janata Party
Lalsot	ST	Parsadi Lal	Indian National Congress
Sikrai	ST	Mahendra Kumar Meena	Indian National Congress
Bandikui	None	Shelender Joshi	Indian National Congress
Dausa	SC	Jeeyalal Bansiwal	Bharatiya Janata Party
Bassi	None	Kanhiya Lal Meena	Bharatiya Janata Party
Jamwa Ramgarh	None	Ram Rai Sharma	Bharatiya Janata Party
Bairath	None	Kamala	Indian National Congress
Kotputli	None	Ram Chander Rawat	Indian National Congress
Bansur	None	Rohitashwa	Independent
Behror	None	Sujan Singh	Independent
Mandawar	None	Ghasi Ram Yadav	Indian National Congress
Tizara	None	Amamuddin Ahamad Khan	Indian National Congress
Khairthal	SC	Madan Mohan	Bharatiya Janata Party
Ramgarh	None	Zuber Khan	Indian National Congress
Alwar	None	Meena Agarwal	Bharatiya Janata Party
Thanagazi	None	Ramakant	Bharatiya Janata Party
Rajgarh	ST	Samrath Lal	Bharatiya Janata Party
Lachhmangarh	None	Nasaru	Janata Dal
Kathumar	SC	Mangal Ram Koli	Independent
Kaman	None	Tayyab Hussain	Indian National Congress
Nagar	None	Gopi Chand	Bharatiya Janata Party
Deeg	None	Arun Singh	Independent
Kumher	None	Hari Singh	Indian National Congress
Bharatpur	None	R. P . Sharma	Indian National Congress
Rupbas	SC	Moti Lal	Bharatiya Janata Party
Nadbai	None	Vishwender Singh	Indian National Congress
Weir	SC	Revti Prasad	Bharatiya Janata Party
Bayana	None	Brij Raj Singh	Janata Dal
Dholpur	None	Banwari Lal	Indian National Congress
Bari	None	Daljeet Singh	Indian National Congress
Karauli	None	Hansraj	Independent
Sapotra	ST	Rang Ji	Bharatiya Janata Party
Khandar	SC	Hari Narayan	Bharatiya Janata Party
Sawai Madhopur	None	Narender Kanwar	Independent
Bamanwas	ST	Heera Lal	Indian National Congress
Gangapur	None	Harish Chand	Indian National Congress
Hindaun	SC	Kamal	Bharatiya Janata Party
Mahuwa	None	Hari Singh	Indian National Congress
Toda Bhim	ST	Ramswaroop	Indian National Congress
Niwai	SC	Banwari Lal Barwa	Indian National Congress
Tonk	None	Mahavir Prasad	Bharatiya Janata Party
Uniara	None	Jagdish Prasad Meena	Bharatiya Janata Party
Todaraisingh	None	Nathu Singh	Bharatiya Janata Party
Malpura	None	Jeet Ram	Bharatiya Janata Party
Kishangarh	None	Jagdeep Dhankhar	Indian National Congress
Ajmer East	SC	Shrikishan Songara	Bharatiya Janata Party
Ajmer West	None	Kishan Motwani	Indian National Congress
Pushkar	None	Vishnu Modi	Indian National Congress
Nasirabad	None	Govind Singh	Indian National Congress
Beawar	None	Ugam Raj Mehta	Bharatiya Janata Party
Masuda	None	Kishan Gopal Kogra	Bharatiya Janata Party
Bhinai	None	Sanwar Lal	Bharatiya Janata Party
Kekri	SC	Shambhu Dayal	Bharatiya Janata Party
Hindoli	None	Shantikumar Dhariwal	Indian National Congress
Nainwa	None	Ramnarayan Meena	Indian National Congress
Patan	SC	Mangilal Megawal	Bharatiya Janata Party
Bandi	None	Om Prakash Sharma	Bharatiya Janata Party
Kota	None	Lalit Kishore Chaturvedi	Bharatiya Janata Party
Ladpura	None	Arjun Das Madan	Bharatiya Janata Party
Digod	None	Vijay Singh	Bharatiya Janata Party
Pipalda	SC	Ram Gopal Bairwa	Indian National Congress
Baran	None	Raghuvir Singh	Bharatiya Janata Party
Kishanganj	ST	Heera Lal Sahariya	Independent
Atru	SC	Madan Dilawar	Bharatiya Janata Party
Chhabra	None	Pratap Singh	Bharatiya Janata Party
Ramganjmandi	None	Ram Kishan Verma	Indian National Congress
Khanpur	None	Bharat Singh	Indian National Congress
Manohar Thana	None	Jagannath	Bharatiya Janata Party
Jhalrapatan	None	Anang Kumar	Bharatiya Janata Party
Pirawa	None	Kanhaiya Lal Patidar	Bharatiya Janata Party
Dag	SC	Babulal Verma	Bharatiya Janata Party
Begun	None	Chhunni Lal	Bharatiya Janata Party
Gangrar	SC	Arjun Lal Jingar	Bharatiya Janata Party
Kapasin	None	Shanker	Bharatiya Janata Party
Chittorgarh	None	Narpat Singh Rajavi	Bharatiya Janata Party
Nimbahera	None	Udai Lal Ajana	Indian National Congress
Badi Sadri	None	Gulabchand Katariya	Bharatiya Janata Party
Pratapgarh	ST	Nand Lal	Bharatiya Janata Party
Kushalgarh	ST	Fateh Singh	Janata Dal
Danpur	ST	Dali Chand	Janata Dal
Ghatol	ST	Jitendra Neenama	Indian National Congress
Banswara	None	Harideo Joshi	Indian National Congress
Bagidora	ST	Poonjalal	Janata Dal
Sagwara	ST	Bheekha Bhai	Indian National Congress
Chorasi	ST	Shankar Lal Ahari	Indian National Congress
Dungarpur	ST	Nathuram Ahari	Indian National Congress
Aspur	ST	Bhimraj Meena	Bharatiya Janata Party
Lasadia	ST	Narayan Lal	Bharatiya Janata Party
Vallabhnagar	None	Gulab Singh	Indian National Congress
Mavli	None	Shanti Lal Chaplot	Bharatiya Janata Party
Rajsamand	SC	Shanti Lal Khoiwal	Bharatiya Janata Party
Nathdwara	None	Shiv Dan Singh Chauhan	Bharatiya Janata Party
Udaipur	None	Shiv Kishor Sandhya	Bharatiya Janata Party
Udaipur Rural	ST	Chunni Lal Garasiya	Bharatiya Janata Party
Salumber	ST	Phool Chand	Bharatiya Janata Party
Sarada	ST	Raghuvir Singh	Indian National Congress
Kherwara	ST	Daya Ram Parmar	Indian National Congress
Phalasia	ST	Kuber Singh	Indian National Congress
Gongunda	ST	Mahaveer Bhagora	Bharatiya Janata Party
Kumbhalgarh	None	Surendra Singh Rathore	Bharatiya Janata Party
Bhim	None	Laxman Singh	Indian National Congress
Mandal	None	Kalu Lal Gujar	Bharatiya Janata Party
Sahada	None	Rampal Upadhyaya	Indian National Congress
Bhilwara	None	Jagdish Chandra Darak	Bharatiya Janata Party
Mandalgarh	None	Badri Prasad Guruji	Bharatiya Janata Party
Jahazpur	None	Ratan Lal Tambi	Independent
Shahpura	SC	Kailash Meghawal	Bharatiya Janata Party
Banera	None	Parakram Singh	Bharatiya Janata Party
Asind	None	Vijayendra Pal Singh	Bharatiya Janata Party
Jaitaran	None	Surendra Goyal	Bharatiya Janata Party
Raipur	None	Sukh Lal Saneha	Indian National Congress
Sojat	None	Madhav Singh Diwan	Indian National Congress
Kharchi	None	Khangar Singh Choudhary	Bharatiya Janata Party
Desuri	SC	Achala Ram	Bharatiya Janata Party
Pali	None	Bhim Raj Bhati	Independent
Sumerpur	None	Beena Kak	Indian National Congress
Bali	None	Bhairon Singh Shekhawat	Bharatiya Janata Party
Sirohi	None	Tara Bhandari	Bharatiya Janata Party
Pindwara Abu	ST	Prabhu Ram Graseeya	Bharatiya Janata Party
Reodar	SC	Jayanti Lal Koli	Bharatiya Janata Party
Sanchore	None	Heera Lal Vishnoi	Indian National Congress
Raniwara	None	Arjun Singh Deora	Bharatiya Janata Party
Bhinmal	None	Pura Ram Choudhary	Bharatiya Janata Party
Jalore	SC	Jogeshwar Garg	Bharatiya Janata Party
Ahore	None	Bhagraj Choudhary	Indian National Congress
Siwana	SC	Tikamchand Kant	Bharatiya Janata Party
Pachpadra	None	Amara Ram	Independent
Barmer	None	Ganga Ram Choudhary	Independent
Gudamalani	None	Paras Ram	Indian National Congress
Chohtan	None	Bhagwan Das	Independent
Sheo	None	Hari Singh	Bharatiya Janata Party
Jaisalmer	None	Gulab Singh	Bharatiya Janata Party
Shergarh	None	Khet Singh Rathor	Indian National Congress
Jodhpur	None	Surya Kanta Vyas	Bharatiya Janata Party
Sardarpura	None	Rajender Gahlot	Bharatiya Janata Party
Sursagar	SC	Mohan Meghwal	Bharatiya Janata Party
Luni	None	Jaswant Singh	Bharatiya Janata Party
Bilara	None	Rajendra Choudhary	Indian National Congress
Bhopalgarh	None	Ram Narain Dudi	Indian National Congress
Osian	None	Narender Singh	Indian National Congress
Phalodi	None	Punam Chand	Indian National Congress
Nagaur	None	Harendra	Indian National Congress
Jayal	SC	Mohan Lal	Indian National Congress
Ladnu	None	Harji Ram Burdak	Indian National Congress
Deedwana	None	Chena Ram	Independent
Nawan	None	Rameshwar Lal	Indian National Congress
Makrana	None	Roopa Ram	Independent
Parbatsar	SC	Rakesh Meghwal	Bharatiya Janata Party
Degana	None	Richhpal Singh	Indian National Congress
Merta	None	Bhanwar Singh	Bharatiya Janata Party
Mundwa	None	Habiburehman / Haziusman	Indian National Congress

== See also ==
- Elections in Rajasthan
