= Vallabhnagar =

Vallabhnagar Untala
- city
- Location in Rajasthan, India Vallabhnagar (India)
- Coordinates: 24°40′23″N 74°00′09″E
- Country: India
- State: Rajasthan
- District: Udaipur

Languages
- Time zone: UTC+5:30 (IST)
- PIN: 313601
- Telephone code: 02957
- ISO 3166 code: RJ-IN
- Vehicle registration: RJ 27
- Lok Sabha constituency: Udaipur

Vallabhnagar is a city in municipal council/nagar palika in Udaipur district of Rajasthan, India. The historical name of Vallabhnagar was Unthala. The population of Vallabhnagar is 8,053.
