= Music of Rajasthan =

This type of music originates from the Rajasthan, one of the states of India and home to several important centers of Indian musical development, including Udaipur, Jodhpur and Jaipur. The region's music shares similarities both with nearby areas of India and the other side of the border, in the Pakistani province of Sindh.

== Overview ==
Rajasthan has a diverse collection of musician castes, including Langas, Sapera, Bhopa, and Manganiar. There are two traditional classes of musicians: the Langas, who stuck mostly exclusively to Muslim audiences and styles, and the Manganiars, who had a more liberal approach.

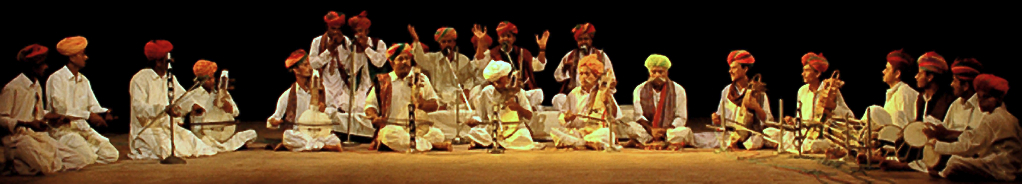
Rajasthani artists

Traditional music includes the women's Panihari songs, which lyrically describes chores, especially centered on water and wells, both of which are an integral part of Rajasthan's desert culture. Other songs, played by various castes, normally begin with the alap, which sets the tune and is followed by a recital of a couplet (dooba). Epic ballads tell tales of heroes like Devnarayan Bhagwan, Gogaji, Ramdeoji, Pabuji and Tejaji. The celebration of changing seasons is also very central to folk music of Rajasthan. Celebration of the coming of the Monsoon or the harvest season are central to most traditional folk songs. Songs also revolve around daily activities of the local people—for instance, a song about not sowing Jeera (Cumin) as it is difficult to tend. Or, for instance, another song about Podina (Mint) and how it is liked by various members of the family (an allegorical reference to a local liquor extracted from mint is also made). Every day common themes are the center of traditional rajasthani folk music.

Komal Kothari was a pioneering scholar who worked for roughly 25 years researching and recording the local practices of Western Rajasthan musicians. The Modern Endangered Archives Program funded a team at the Archives and Research Center for Ethnomusicology (ARCE) at the American Institute of Indian Studies (AIIS) to digitize nearly 1200 sound recordings documenting ballads, oral epics and storytelling by hereditary musician castes. This collection is available digitally through the UCLA library.

=== List of Rajasthani folk singers ===
One of the most famous Rajasthani Maand singers is Allah Jilai Bai of the Bikaner Gharana.

- Allah Jilai Bai
- Kutle Khan
- Kheta Khan
- Mame Khan
- Seema Mishra
- Prakash Mali
- Satkeer
- Chotu Singh Rawna
- Anupriya Lakhawat
- Hemraj Goyal
- Dapu Khan
- Ila Arun

== See also ==
- Jaipur-Atrauli gharana
- Rapperiya Baalam
- Musical Instruments of Rajasthan
- Veena Music
