= Lekin... =

1991 film directed by Gulzar

- Film poster
- Directed by: Gulzar
- Written by: Gulzar
- Based on: Kshudhit Pashaan by Rabindranath Tagore
- Produced by: Lata Mangeshkar; Hridaynath Mangeshkar; Bal Phule
- Starring: Vinod Khanna; Dimple Kapadia
- Cinematography: Manmohan Singh
- Edited by: Subhash Sehgal
- Music by: Hridaynath Mangeshkar (music); Gulzar (lyrics)
- Release date: 11 October 1991
- Running time: 171 minutes
- Country: India
- Language: Hindi

Lekin... (transl. But...) is a 1991 Hindi drama mystery film, loosely based on the 1895 short story Kshudhit Pashaan ("The Hungry Stones") by Rabindranath Tagore and directed by Gulzar. It stars Vinod Khanna, Dimple Kapadia, Amjad Khan, Alok Nath, and Beena Banerjee, and features a special appearance by Hema Malini. The film tells the story of Reva, a restless ghost who seeks liberation and haunts the ancient palace of Raja Param Singh in Rajasthan when she is discovered by Sameer, a museum curator sent by the government to salvage valuables in the region. As she recreates a visual representation of the history of the palace which reveals her tragic story, Sameer becomes determined to help set her free.

Produced by Indian singer Lata Mangeshkar (and co-produced by Hridaynath Mangeshkar and Bal Phule), the film took four years to release in theaters. It opened to positive reviews, with particular praise directed at Dimple Kapadia's performance. The soundtrack, composed by Hridaynath, was well-received, with Lata's rendition of "Yaara Seeli Seeli" becoming particularly popular. At the 38th National Film Awards, the film won five awards, a record for that year, including Best Music Direction for Hridaynath, Best Female Playback Singer for Lata, and Best Lyricist for Gulzar. At the 37th Filmfare Awards, the film won the Best Lyricist award, and Kapadia was nominated for Best Actress for her performance.

== Plot ==
Government officer Sameer Niyogi is sent to Rajasthan to take inventory of items in the abandoned haveli (mansion) of the long-deceased Maharaja Param Singh. When he arrives in Rajasthan, he meets his old friend Shafi who is a tax collector in the area and lives with his wife Sharda.

En-route his journey to Jasor, Sameer begins seeing what he thinks could very well be visions of another time and place, visions that he is shown by a beautiful woman he encounters by the name of Reva. She keeps appearing and disappearing during his stay in Jasor. The mysterious appearance and disappearance initially shakes Sameer but reassurance that spirits exist from an expert on the field gives him an unknown inner motivation to find out the truth behind Reva and his own self, as well as find out the reason he is connected with this story.

The next time Sameer meets Reva, she trasports him into her past by presenting to him an apparitional display from ancient days in the palace. According to the story revealed through her recreation, Reva is a spirit stranded in a period of time, attempting to cross the desert to meet her long-lost sister Tara. The older sister, Tara, comes to Maharaja Param Veer's palace for a singing and dancing performance one night. The Maharaja eyes her malevolently and orders his men to not let her go out of the palace that night so he can rape her. Ustad Miraj Ali, the musical maestro in the king's court, who also happens to be Tara and Reva's music teacher, learns of the king's plan. He warns the father of Tara and Reva and advises them to run away from the town by crossing the desert. The King learns of this and imprisons Miraj Ali and Reva in the castle dungeons while Tara's camel runs ahead in the desert but is never heard of. The cruel Maharaja also orders Tara and Reva's father to be lashed till he bleeds to a near-death condition and then orders his men to put him on a camel's back and send him into the desert.

The lecherous King then turns his attention to Reva. He would wait until she would grow into a young woman. Reva spends 8 years in captivity and one day the King wishes to sexually gratify himself with her. Ustad Miraj Ali along with the help of one of the king's servants hatch a plan to help Reva run away from prison to save herself from the King. We learn that Reva narrowly escaped the clutches of indulgent King Param Singh. Her mentor Ustad Miraj Ali gives an oath of the Quran to one of his acquaintances, Mehru, who is supposed to help Reva cross the desert. But in the attempt to cross the desert, Mehru is caught by the King's men and punished by lashes and dropped to his village in a near-dead condition. Reva is killed in a severe desert sandstorm. She gets frozen in a moment of time. As events unfold towards the end, we come to know that Sameer is the rebirth of Mehru and that Reva's elder sister, Tara successfully managed to cross the desert when her camel ran ahead. Tara is now older and has a daughter named after her dead, lost sister, Reva. Ustad Miraj Ali also is alive and at Tara's house although he is very old. As soon as Sameer reaches Tara's house with the news about Reva, Ustad Miraj Ali recognises him as Mehru and dies in his arms. Sameer also discovers a skeleton of Raja Param Singh in the castle dungeons. The 2 gold teeth in the skull help establish the identity of that skeleton as belonging to King Param Singh. It remains a mystery how King Param Singh died in the castle dungeon and how Ustad Miraj Ali managed to escape.

Sameer eventually ends up fulfilling his commitment to help Reva's spirit not only cross the desert but also liberate her from the period of time in which she was stranded.

== Cast ==
The film's cast is as follows:

- Vinod Khanna – Sameer Niyogi
- Dimple Kapadia – Reva
- Amjad Khan – Shafi Ahmed Siddiqui
- Beena Banerjee – Sharda, Shafi's wife
- Alok Nath – Ustad Meraj Ali
- Hema Malini – Tara (guest appearance)
- Moon Moon Sen – Pammi
- Vijayendra Ghatge – Raja Param Singh

== Production ==
Lata Mangeshkar's initiative to produce a film revolved solely around the idea of making a film with good music, as she was devastated by the quality of the songs that prevailed in the film industry and that she had to sing throughout the past decade. She approached Gulzar to direct the planned film. Having accepted her offer, he decided to adapt Rabindranath Tagore's 1895 spiritual short story Kshudhit Pashaan, also known as The Hungry Stones. Gulzar later explained his choice of Tagore: "I wanted to capture Tagore’s original voice, the voice that found expression only in Bangla and that was not replicated in the English translations." In their conversations, Lata and Gulzar would often discuss supernatural phenomena. Those were the days when cases of supposed reincarnation were being reported on in the press. Educated intellectuals would often accept them albeit with certain degrees of doubt and skepticism, and their arguments would often end with "Lekin..." (But...), hence the title of the film.

As soon as Kapadia learned about the project, she repeatedly called Gulzar and Mangeshkar insisting to be cast as Reva until she finally got the part. Vinod Khanna, who had been on a hiatus from acting and planned a comeback, approached Gulzar and asked if there was a role for him. Incidentally, the casting had almost completed by that time except for that of the male lead, and Khanna signed on to play Sameer. The film took four years to get made and released. The mahurat clap was given by cricketer Sunil Gavaskar in 1987. The film was shot during 1989. Gulzar had travelled extensively in Rajasthan (around 5,000 kilometers) looking for shooting locations. To make Kapadia's character more truthful to its ghost-like nature, Gulzar forbade Kapadia to blink during filming in order to capture an "endless, fixed gaze" that would give her "a feeling of being surreal".

== Soundtrack ==
All the songs from Lekin... were composed by Hridaynath Mangeshkar and the lyrics were written by Gulzar. Cine Blitz magazine described the soundtrack as Hridaynath's "most realised work yet" which allows to emerge as "a fully rounded personality". Gulzar was noted for his work as a lyricist. "Suniyo Ji Araj Mhario" is based on the composition in Raga Vihanginee by Pt. Mani Prasad. India Today described the soundtrack as "a blend of Hindustani classical and Rajasthani folk" which is "soothing and soulful".

No.	Title	Artist(s)	Length
1.	"Kesariya Baalma Oji Ke Tumse Laage Nain (Raga Mand)"	Lata Mangeshkar	5:24
2.	"Kesariya Baalma Mohe Bawari Bole Log (Raga Mand)"	Lata Mangeshkar	6:08
3.	"Surmai Shaam (Raga Pahadi)"	Suresh Wadkar	5:50
4.	"Yaara Seeli Seeli"	Lata Mangeshkar	5:05
5.	"Suniyo Ji Araj (Raga Bhupali)"	Lata Mangeshkar	5:04
6.	"Joothe Naina (Raga Bilakshani Todi)"	Asha Bhosle, Satyasheel Deshpande	6:18
7.	"Main Ek Sadi Se"	Lata Mangeshkar	5:32
8.	"Ja Ja Re (Raga Gurjari Todi)"	Lata Mangeshkar, Hridaynath Mangeshkar	3:17
9.	"Dil Mein Lekar Tumhari Yaad Chale"	Lata Mangeshkar	4:00

== Release, reception and legacy ==
Prior to its theatrical release a year later, the film was first among the 19 films selected for the Indian panorama section to be screened at the 22nd International Film Festival of India. Released in cinemas on 11 October 1991, Lekin... was a critical success in contrast to its modest commercial income. The film drew praise from critics for its story, music, costumes, and particularly Kapadia's lead performance as Reva. Writing for The Indian Express, Subhash K. Jha concluded his review of the film at the time of its release saying, "Lekin is a deeply satisfying work of incandescent beauty." He further wrote of the character of Reva and Kapadia's portrayal of the part: "Trapped in the no-man's land is the spiritual named, Reva. Filmed in the golden expanses of the Rajasthani desert and played with intense tragedy by Dimple, the insubstantial character is the essence of evanescence." India Today described it as a watchable film about "the bewitching Dimple who traverses time". Indian Cinema, a catalogue by the National Film Development Corporation of India wrote that Lekin is "a superbly well-made film, but then, when it thematically strays into the field of fantasy we are forced to recognise this strand which is promoting 'elite masses'." The same publication wrote in the same year of Kapadia's performance: "the role requires more than a simplistic understanding of the character and the actress ... approaches it with an instinctive maturity. Dimple Kapadia's eyes speak volumes."

Throughout the years, Kapadia has maintained that the part of Reva is her personal favourite, calling it "the most fantastic role" of her career, and wished it had been given more screen time in the film. Actress Raveena Tandon called the part a dream role rarely found in Hindi films. Filmfare's Devesh Sharma listed it as one of Kapadia's best films and described it as "a supernatural love story where the desert of Rajasthan too becomes a character". The Times of India hailed her as "exceptional" and further wrote that she "looked real, convincing and incredible - all at the same time, in her very authentic Rajasthani attire". According to Jha in the book The Essential Guide to Bollywood, "The film is made memorable by Dimple Kapadia's unblinking portrayal of the ghost, rendered immeasurably ethereal by the underrated composer Hridayanath Mangeshkar's haunting melodies sung with ravishing resonance by the composer's sister Lata Mangeshkar." In a 2021 article for the National Herald, Jha included Lekin in the list of Kapadia's best performances. Sukanya Verma of Rediff.com wrote, "Dimple achieves a soulful embodiment of Gulzar's enigmatic apparition and melancholy in Lekin."

In a piece about the film's costume designer Bhanu Athaiya, Lekha J. Tandon of The Indian Express wrote, "Lekin is striking, not just for its haunting story and music, and Dimple Kapadia's performance, but also for its mood and tone. Athaiya can claim credit for this, because her costumes, especially the heroine's, fully capture the mysterious mood and ambiguous tone of the film." In 2000, M.L. Dhawan listed the film as one of the best films of 1991, labelling it a "celluloid classic". Verma of Rediff.com wrote that "Gulzar's exquisite poetry combined with the stark surroundings give a haunting quality to the film." Author and journalist Rasheed Kidwai, in his book Neta–Abhineta: Bollywood Star Power in Indian Politics, called the film an "underrated metaphysical melodrama". According to Kidwai, the film is known as one of Vinod Khanna's "greatest works". In his book Hero, author Ashok Raj praised Khanna for delivering "an impressive performance" in the lead part. Lata Mangeshkar said that she considers Lekin "a very proud achievement" for her.

The film's music maintains considerable popularity. Rajiv Vijayakar of The Indian Express lauded the film's soundtrack as Hridaynath Mangeshkar's "career-best Hindi film score" in what he considered a "stupendous album". Rineeta Naik of Scroll.in praised the "combination of Gulzar’s lyrics and Hridaynath Mangeshkar’s music", which is "adequately ghostly". She elaborated, "The music follows, with Rajasthani folk tunes enhanced and embellished by Gulzar’s poetry and the komalswars (half notes) of Maand, Todi and the rarely performed Vihangini (a form of Raga created by Pt. Mani Prasad), all lending pathos and mystery, the essential elements of the film." "Yaara Seeli Seeli", pictured on Kapadia, became the most popular song of the soundtrack. In 2015, author Ganesh Anantharaman wrote of Gulzar's lyrics, "At a time when film lyrics and music had coarsened to a point of no return, Gulzar retained his integrity as lyricist and wrote "Yaara Seeli Seeli" and other haunting songs for Lekin." A 2015 film directed by Subhash Sehgal was titled Yaara Silly Silly in humorous tribute to the song's lyrics.

== Analysis ==
Gulzar said about the film, "Lekin, for me, is special because of its element of mystery. Usually, when you make a mystery film, you provide a solution at the end. Lekin however doesn't - it just leaves you wondering." Subhash K. Jha said Lekin is "a film of hints, allusions and illusions". Writing for Scroll.in, Damini Kulkarni wrote, "Lekin draws a powerful analogy between a ghost frozen in time and a woman repeatedly victimised by men." Meheli Sen, in her book Haunting Bollywood: Gender, Genre, and the Supernatural in Hindi Commercial Cinema labelled the film as an "iteration of the Gothic film". According to Encyclopedia of Indian Cinema, the film "adds to the horror iconography" through the use of "ruins, dungeons, suggestive music and fluttering pigeons", as well as its portrayal of the tribal Banjaras.

Ruth Vanita, author of the book Dancing with the Nation, claims that Lekin is "a good example of the merry mix that is Hindu–Muslim hybridity in Bombay cinema". She explained that kind Muslims dominate the background of the story, often saving the Hindu characters, and the order is reversed in present times with good Hindus. Discussing the film's themes, Vanita writes that the film's main element are ghosts, which are common in both popular Hinduism and Islam, but believes that "rebirth provides the enclosing framework". Vanita further notes the fact that unlike previous ghost stories in Hindi films, in this film the ghost is real. In the same book, the author mentions the way the erotic undertone of the story is built, where the male lead is attracted more to the ghost than his wife, with "death and liberation portrayed as almost orgasmic experiences".

== Awards ==
Lekin... was the major winner at the 38th National Film Awards, winning five awards, the maximum of awards won at that ceremony. Mangeshkar won the Best Female Playback Singer for "singing with outstanding expressions with the rarest and purest of styles"; Nitish Roy won the Best Art Direction for "maintaining the era, etching the characters against the canvas, with perfect colour, design and execution"; Bhanu Athaiya was named Best Costume Designer for her "texture and tone of the costumes, which heighten the visual quality of the film"; Hridaynath Mangeshkar's won the Best Music Direction for "using traditional tunes and instruments creatively, with litting melody and haunting perfection", and Gulzar was awarded the Best Lyrics for "evoking beautiful imagery, created through lyrical poetry". Dimple Kapadia's performance was said to have lost the Best Actress award at the same function by one vote. It was nominated for three Filmfare Awards, winning one for Gulzar's lyrics. At the 55th Bengal Film Journalists' Association Awards, the film won three awards in the Hindi section, where Kapadia herself won the Best Actress award for another film.

Award	Category	Recipient(s) and nominee(s)	Result	Ref.
38th National Film Awards	Best Female Playback Singer	Lata Mangeshkar	Won	
38th National Film Awards	Best Art Direction	Nitish Roy	Won	
38th National Film Awards	Best Costume Design	Bhanu Athaiya	Won	
38th National Film Awards	Best Music Direction	Hridaynath Mangeshkar	Won	
38th National Film Awards	Best Lyrics	Gulzar	Won	
37th Filmfare Awards	Filmfare Award for Best Actress	Dimple Kapadia	Nominated	
37th Filmfare Awards	Best Music Director	Hridaynath Mangeshkar	Nominated	
37th Filmfare Awards	Best Lyricist	Gulzar for "Yaara Seeli Seeli"	Won	
55th Bengal Film Journalists'; Association Awards	Best Lyricist (Hindi)	Gulzar	Won	
55th Bengal Film Journalists'; Association Awards	Best Female Playback Singer (Hindi)	Lata Mangeshkar	Won	
55th Bengal Film Journalists'; Association Awards	Best Art Director (Hindi)	Nitish Roy	Won	

== See also ==
- Moti Shahi Mahal
- Kshudhita Pashan

== Bibliography ==
- Anantharaman, Ganesh (2008). Bollywood Melodies: A History of the Hindi Film Song. Penguin Books India. ISBN 978-0-14-306340-7.
- Arunachalam, Param (14 April 2020). BollySwar: 1981 - 1990. Mavrix Infotech Private Limited. ISBN 978-81-938482-2-7.
- Gulzar, Meghna (2004). Because he is ... Rupa & Co. ISBN 81-291-0364-8. Archived from the original on 20 October 2020.
- Jha, Subhash K.; Bachchan, Amitabh (2005). The Essential Guide to Bollywood. Lustre Press. ISBN 978-81-7436-378-7.
- Kidwai, Rasheed (5 September 2018). Neta–Abhineta: Bollywood Star Power in Indian Politics. Hachette India. ISBN 978-93-5009-803-5.
- Rajadhyaksha, Ashish; Willemen, Paul (1999). Encyclopedia of Indian Cinema. Routledge. ISBN 978-1-135-94325-7.
- Raj, Ashok (1 November 2009). Hero Vol.2. Hay House, Inc. ISBN 978-93-81398-03-6.
- Sen, Meheli (2017). Haunting Bollywood: Gender, Genre, and the Supernatural in Hindi Commercial Cinema. University of Texas Press. ISBN 978-1-4773-1158-5. Archived from the original on 16 August 2021.
- Vanita, Ruth (22 February 2018). Dancing with the Nation: Courtesans in Bombay Cinema. Bloomsbury Publishing USA. ISBN 978-1-5013-3444-3.
