= Gavri Devi =

Indian folk singer (1928–2026)

- Born: Gavri Devi; 14 April 1928
- Died: 11 June 2026 (aged 98)
- Other name: Gavari Bai
- Occupation: Folk singer
- Notable work: Mand singing
- Awards: Rajasthan Ratna (2013); Sangeet Natak Akademi Award(1986)

Gavri Devi (also known as Gavari Bai) (14 April 1928 – 11 june 2026) was an Indian folk singer from Rajasthan, India, known for her Mand, a singing style of folk music. In addition to Mand singing, she used to sing Thumri, Bhajan and Ghazal. She was also known as Rajasthan's Maru Kokila. The Government of Rajasthan honored her posthumously with Rajasthan Ratna, the highest civilian award of Rajasthan in 2013 for her contribution to art and music.

At the age of 20, she was married to Mohanlal Gameti from Jodhpur, with whom she had a daughter. She also received encouragement from Umaid Singh, the Maharaja of Jodhpur to pursue music. She performed music across India, including states such as Orissa, Karnataka, Maharashtra, Goa, Bengal, Kerala, Tamil Nadu.

In the year 1957, Gavri Devi started giving the program of Mand Singing on Radio and Doordarshan, which became quite popular. She presented the program of Mand singing at the ceremony organized by the Department of Tourism, Government of Rajasthan every year. In 1983, She gave her special performance, Kesariya Balam Aavo Hamare Des' at the Festival of India, which was organized by India, in Moscow, Russia. She was listed in Who's Who in Asia in 1980.

In 1986, the Government of India honored her with Sangeet Natak Akademi Award, the highest Indian recognition given to practicing artists for her contribution to folk music. The award was bestowed by then Indian president R. Venkataraman. Gavri Devi died on 11 june 2026.
