= Paner (disambiguation) =

Paner is a village in Ajmer district in Rajasthan, India

Paner may also refer to:

- Danita Paner (born 1989), Filipino pop-rock singer and actress
- Kristina Paner (born 1971), Filipina actress and singer
- Manuel Paner (born 1949), better known as Manny Paner, Filipino basketball player
