= Veena Music =

Indian music label

- Native name: Oriental Audio Visual Electronics
- Type: Private
- Industry: Music; Entertainment
- Genre: Traditional folk, regional
- Founder: Kesari Chand Maloo
- Headquarters: Jaipur, Haldia House, Johari Bazaar, Jaipur, (Rajasthan), India
- Key people: K. C. Maloo (chairman), Hemjit Maloo (director), Seema Mishra
- Products: Music
- Services: Music, Cultural programs
- Owner: K. C. Maloo
- Website: www.veenamusiconline.com

Veena Music (Oriental Audio Visual Electronics) is a music label based in Rajasthan, India. It is owned by K. C. Maloo and is headquartered at Jaipur. Since its establishment, it has released many albums in Rajasthani and Hindi languages. and has also acquired music rights of many Rajasthani films. Its main aim is to promote true Rajasthani music in today's music scenario of adulterated, poor and high-noise music. It was established 25 years ago, and has since been a pioneer in fostering Rajasthani music through its albums and various cultural programmes held across the state and abroad.

It is a music label in Rajasthan. Many regional and non-regional artists are associated with the label which includes regional artists Seema Mishra, Deepali, Supriya and O. P. Vyas while non-regional singers include Shreya Ghoshal, Sunidhi Chauhan, Kavita Krishnamurthy, Udit Narayan and Sadhana Sargam etc. As of March 2016, the label is also a member of Phonographic Performance Limited. The Rajasthani singer Seema Mishra was launched by Veena. She is known as Maru-Kokila (The Desert Cuckoo).

== Albums ==
Veena group has released various albums since its inception centered mainly on Rajasthani culture and traditions. Its main focus is to bring out the true essence of Rajasthani folk music. The albums showcase an amalgam of Rajasthani folk with the contemporary music and is received positively by people in Rajasthan and also other states. The main genres of album include romance, devotional, fun & joy, wedding, dance, celebration etc. Veena's album Ghoomar which was released in 4 parts from 2000 to 2001 was very well received and became the biggest selling Rajasthani album of the year which also promoted the folk dance "Ghoomar" of Rajasthan. It has also released various Maand albums sung by Allah Jilai Bai. Their song "Pallo Latake" from the album of the same name was featured in the Star Plus soap Diya Aur Baati Hum and the song "Mhari Bahu Ae" was featured in Colors soap Balika Vadhu. It has also released folk albums sung by Manganiars. Following is the list of some most notable albums released by the label.

- Gorband
- Ghoomar (4 parts)
- Balam Chhoto So
- Kuve Par Aekali (2 parts)
- Chudi Chamke

== Awards ==
- "Dagar Gharana Award" by Maharana of Mewar Charitable Foundation, 2012
- "Rajasthani Film Award" by the then Governor of Rajasthan Pratibha Patil.
