= Batool =

Batool is a surname and given name. Notable people with the name include:

== Surname ==
- Sidra Batool (born 1985), Pakistani actress
- Zehra Batool (born 1955), Pakistani politician

== Given name ==
- Batool Begam, Indian folk singer
- Batool Fatima (born 1982), Pakistani cricketer

== See also ==
- Mariam Al-Batool Mosque, in Malta
