= Musical instruments of Rajasthan =

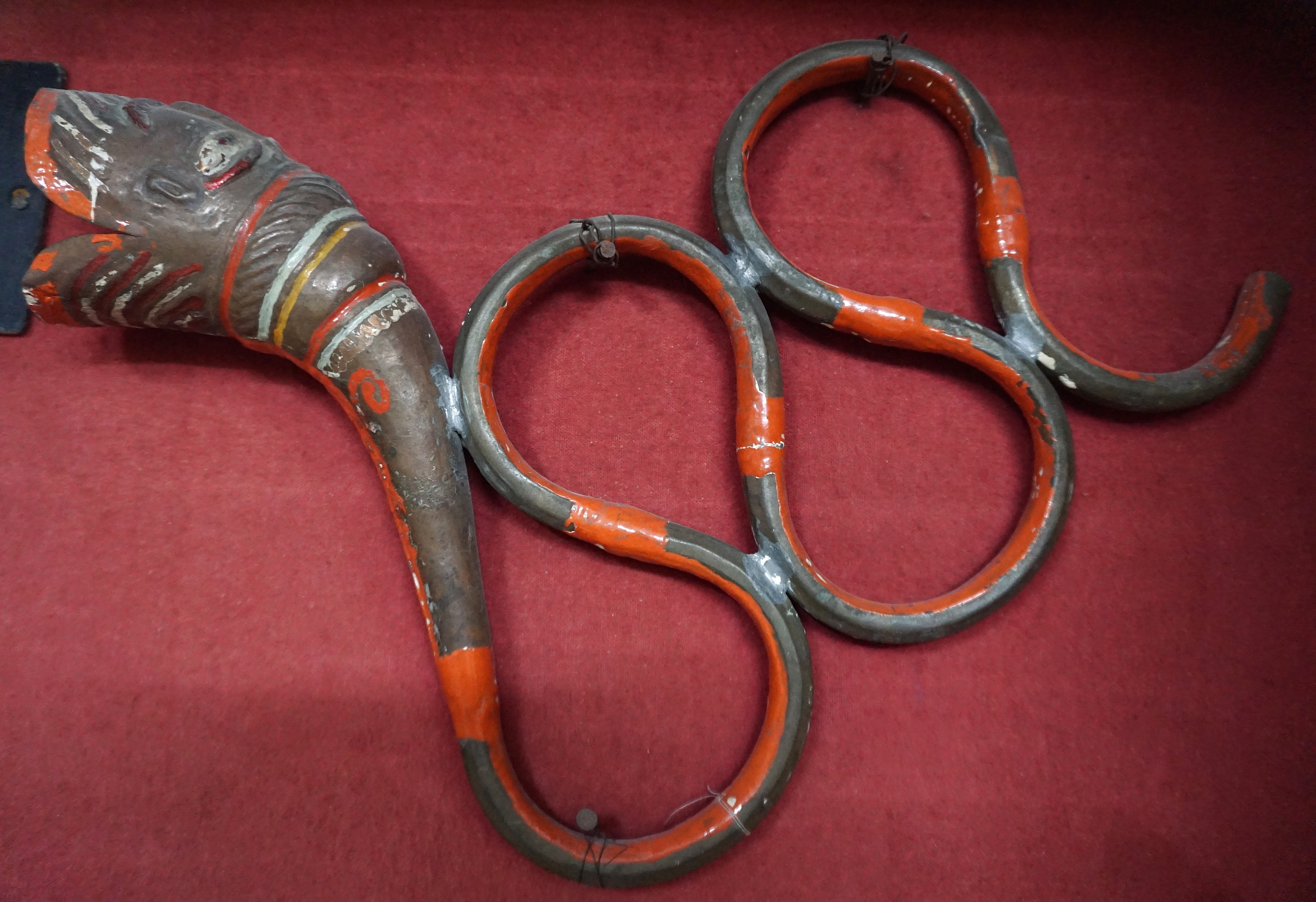
A nagphani

The musical instruments of Rajasthan include: ravanahatha, kamayacha, Sindhi sarangi, morchang, algoze, bin, nagphani, bankia, tarpi, chautara, ghara, jantar, chikara, ektara, murali, murli, gujari sarangi, deru, bapang, bhapang and khartal.

== List of Rajasthani musical instruments ==
=== Algoza ===
Alghoza, also known as Algoza, is a traditional double-flute woodwind instrument prominent in the folk music of Sindhi, Kutchi, Saraiki, Punjabi, Rajasthani, and Baloch cultures. It consists of two beak flutes—one producing the melody and the other providing a continuous drone. These flutes are either bound together or held side by side while playing. The instrument requires a constant stream of air, as both flutes are blown simultaneously to create a rhythmic and melodic soundscape.

=== Bin ===
Bin is the Rajasthani word for mashak, which means bagpipes in Hindi. They are a type of bagpipe native to Rajasthan, and are similar to the algoza. Its name also means water bag, as the bag was originally used to carry water. The bin is also heavily used in Kumaon, Garhwal, and parts of Uttar Pradesh.

=== Bhapang ===
Bhapang is an instrument that looks like a drum, but uses string. They are made from gourd shells, and use a flexible cloth to cover the gourd, like goat skin. Then strings hang from the skin and are tied at the middle of the 2 shells. A bamboo stick is then used to produce pitches.

=== Chautara ===
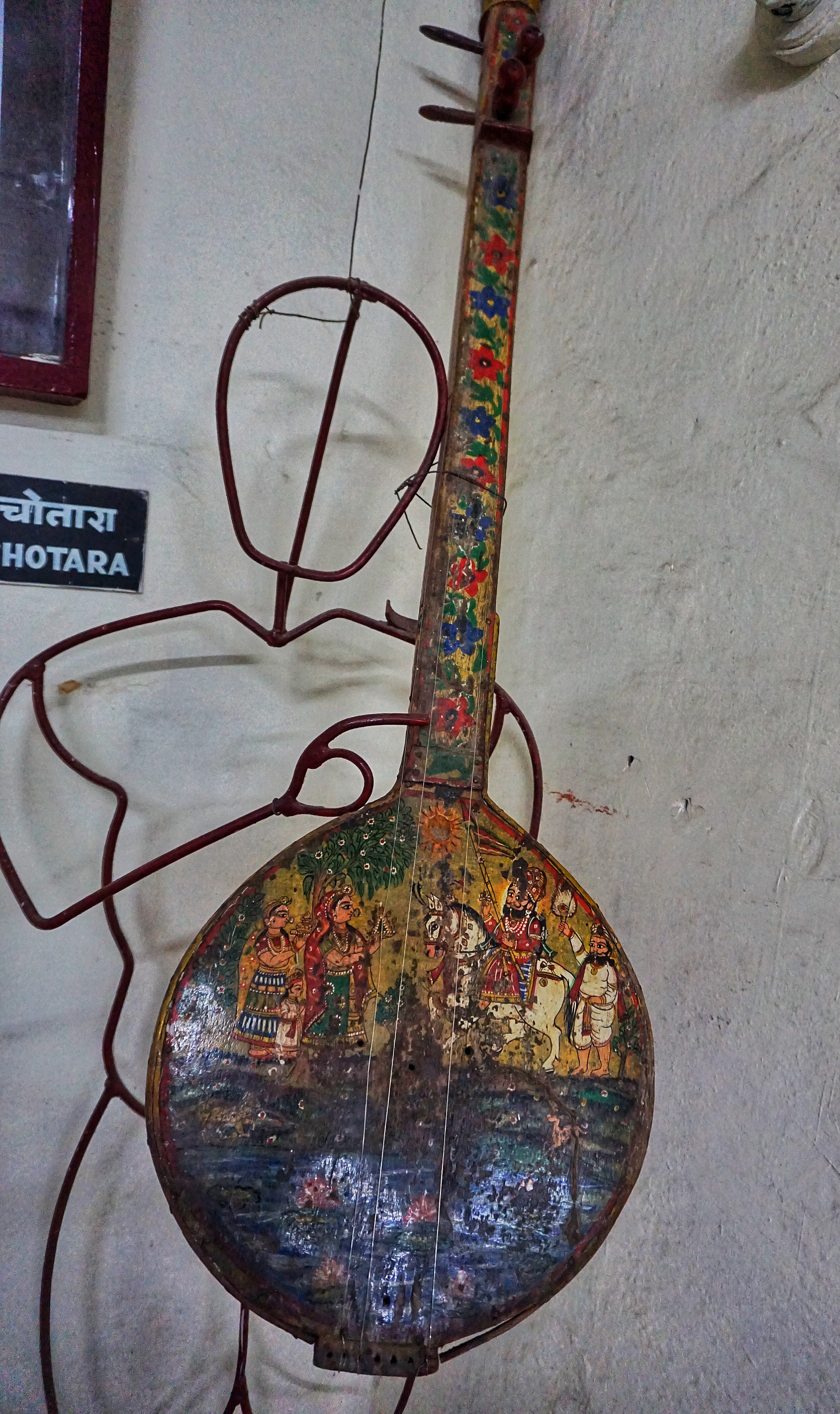
An image of a decorated chautara along with a human figure.

The Chautara, as shown from its name, has four strings and is similar to the tanpura in its use. It is made of light wood and used as an accompaniment in singing.

=== Deru ===
A corn hand percussion instrument that is like the bhapang. The drum is made from mango wood, and the drum's sides have skin covering them. Strings are attached, and the player uses these to change pitch.

=== Jantar ===
A type of veena, with 2 resonators. These resonators are made of gourd or wood. The rest of the jantar uses wood, steel, and horsehair, traditionally. It is considered an early form of veena, and is closest to the Rudra veena and Saraswati veena.

=== Kamayacha ===
The seventeen-string kamayacha, or khamaycha, is a string instrument constructed out of a piece of mango wood, featuring a round resonator covered in goat leather. It is also related to the sarangi and chikara, but has its own unique sound.

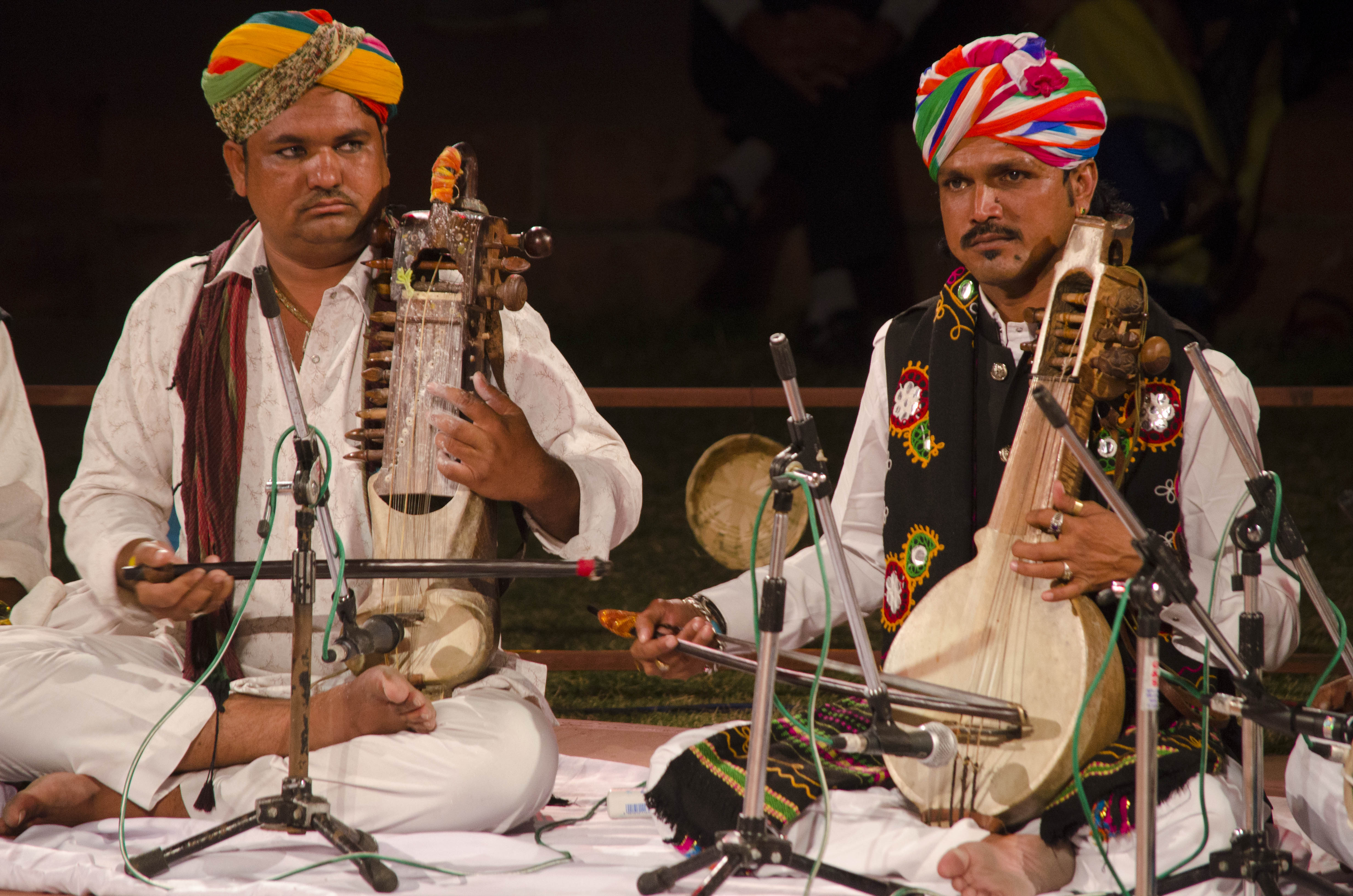
The man on the left is playing the sarangi. The man on the right is playing the kamayacha.

Three of its strings are made of goat intestine, while the other fourteen are made of steel. It is a key presence in Rajasthani folk music, and is heard in Jaisalmer and Barmer. Sakar Khan, who received Padma Shri for his work with kamayacha, and Dapu Khan are some of its most well-known players.

=== Khartal ===
Khartal also known as Kartals are a traditional percussion instrument used in Rajasthan, consisting of a pair of thin, hard wooden pieces. They are similar in function to percussion bones and are commonly used in folk music and devotional performances.

=== Pungi ===
Murali is also known as bansuri, and Murli is known as Pungi. The bansuri is the Indian flute made of bamboo. The pungi is the instrument that was once used by snake charmers, but still used by musicians today. It is made out of bamboo with a gourd at its top.

=== Nagphani ===
Nagphani is a traditional wind instrument belonging to the Kumaon region in Uttarakhand. This is also played in Gujarat and Rajasthan. It is shaped like a serpent (Nag means serpent in Sanskrit, thus giving it the name) with a metal tongue painted with bright colours. This instrument resembles a snake with a round and open mouth, is made of copper and bronze and is smaller in size than other wind instruments. It is used by tantrik ritual performers. Nagphani was also played during battles to boost the morale of the troops and is occasional during weddings and gatherings.

=== Raavanhatha ===
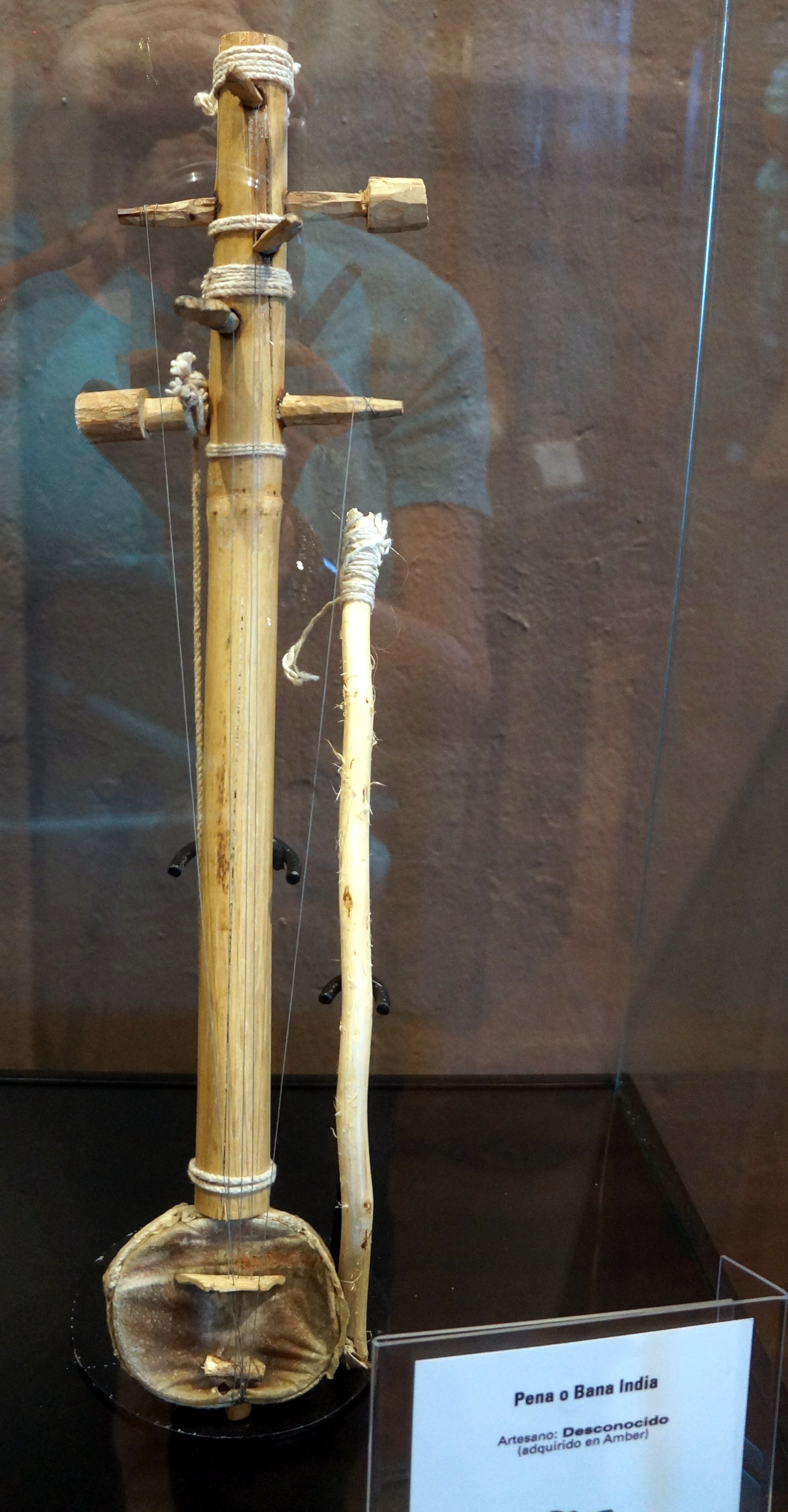
Indian Ravanhatha at the Casa Museo Del Timple, Lanzarote, Spain

Raavan hatha, or 'Raavan's hand' is a string instrument modelled from a legend telling the story of Raavan came upon his death by Lord Rama in Sri Lanka. Fifteen metallic pegs run along the stem of the instrument representing Raavan's fifteen fingers. The two wooden pegs behind the stem represent his thumbs. The coconut base represents the shoulder and the strings represent the nerves.

=== Sarangi ===
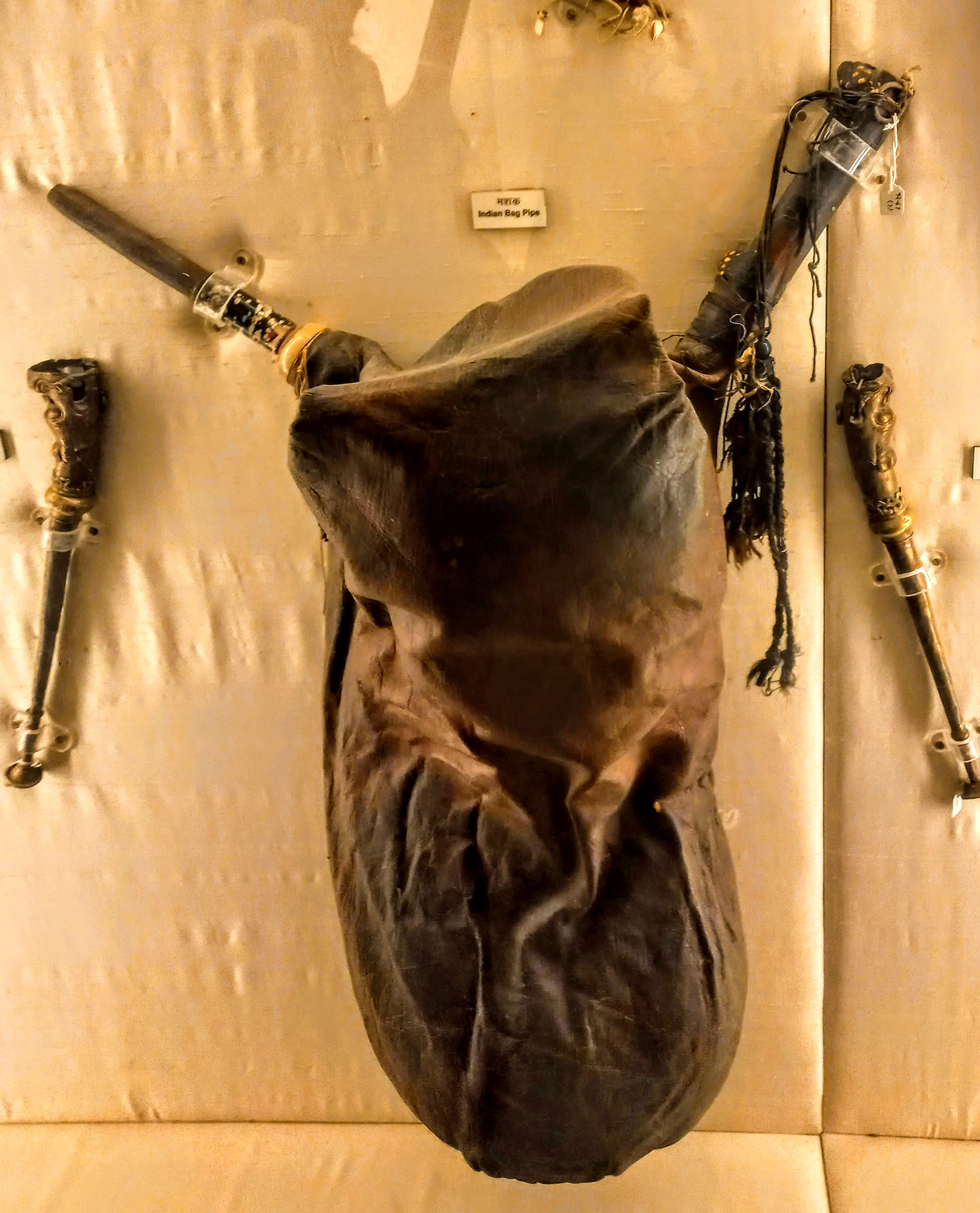
An image of mashak, the traditional Indian bagpipe.

There are two instruments which are known as sarangi in Rajasthan. The first is Sindhi sarangi. It is the real sarangi with many strings, pegs, and the sound of a human voice. It resembles a Western violin. The Gujari sarangi is shaped like a smaller Ravanahatha, but is called a sarangi.
