= Rajasthan Ratna =

Civilian award

Rajasthan Ratna Award
- State Civilian award
- Awarded for: Services of personalities in various fields
- Sponsored by: Government of Rajasthan
- Location: Rajasthan
- Reward: ₹100,000

Rajasthan Ratna (Jewel of Rajasthan or Gem of Rajasthan) is the highest civilian award of Rajasthan. Any person without distinction of race, occupation, position, or sex is eligible for the award.

Awardees are given one hundred thousand rupees, a shawl, and a citation by the state governor, chief minister, and minister of art and culture. The award mirrors the Bharat Ratna which is conferred by the Government of India.

== Recipients ==
The following Rajasthanis were given the award:

== 2012 ==
- Allah Jilai Bai, singer
- Kanhaiyalal Sethia, poet
- Komal Kothari, author
- Lakshmi Kumari Chundawat, author
- Vijaydan Detha, author
- Jagjit Singh, singer
- Vishwa Mohan Bhatt, musician

Except for Chundawat, Detha and Bhatt, the award was conferred posthumously.

== 2013 ==
- D. R. Mehta, social service
- Jasdev Singh, commentary
- Ram Narayan, sarangi player
- Nagendra Singh, law
- Kailash Sankhala, environment protection
- Hasrat Jaipuri, Urdu Hindi poet
- Gavri Devi, Maand singer
