= Sursura =

- Village
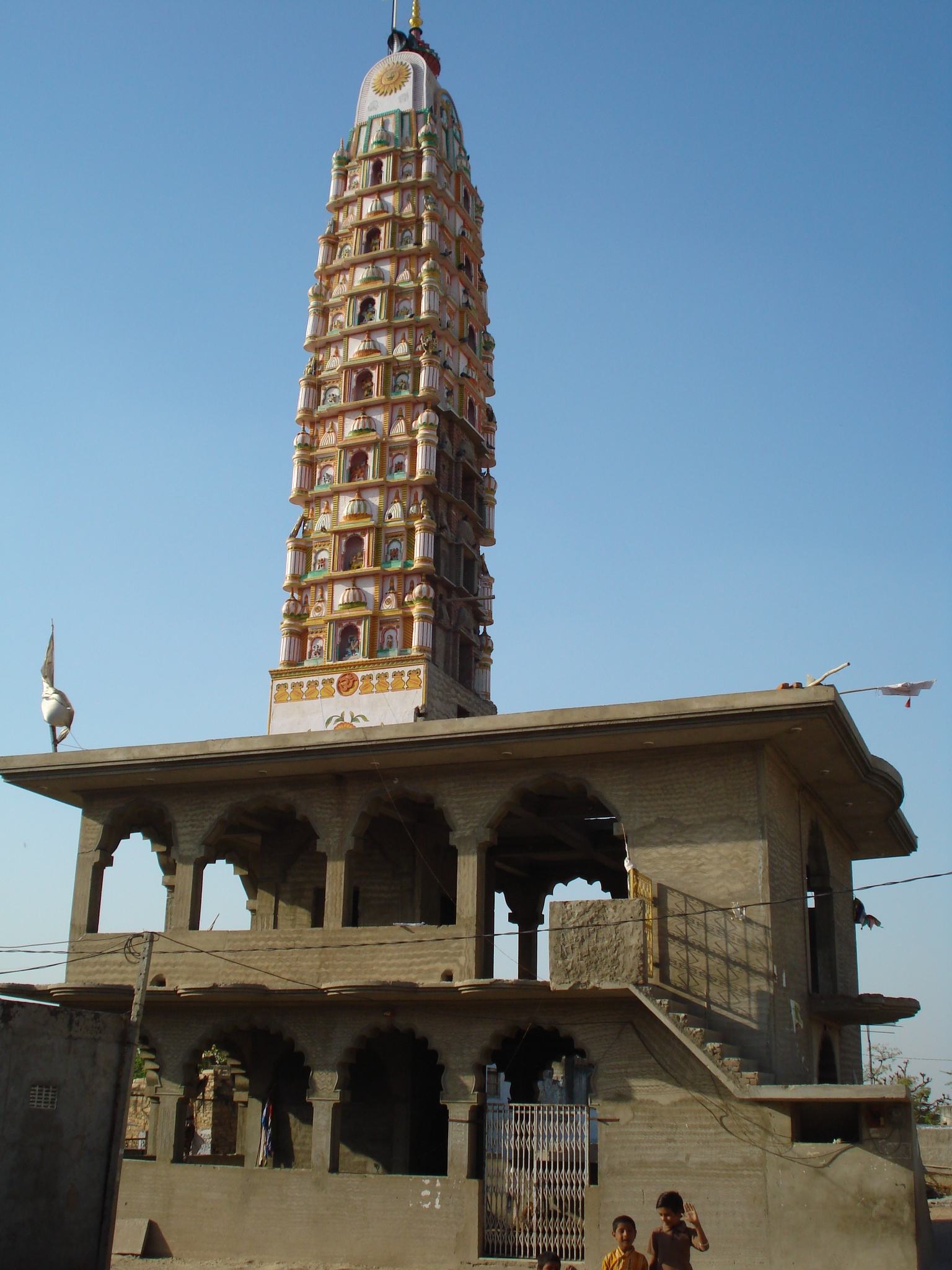
- Shree Veer Tejaji samadhi sthala Temple
- Nickname: Teja Dham
- Location in Rajasthan, India Sursura (India)
- Coordinates: 26.80°N 75.04°E
- Country: India
- State: Rajasthan
- District: Ajmer

Languages
  - Official: Hindi
- Time zone: UTC+5:30 (IST)
- PIN: 305801
- Telephone code: 01497
- ISO 3166 code: RJ-IN
- Vehicle registration: RJ - 42

Sursara, also known as Sursura, is a village in Kishangarh tehsil in Ajmer district in the Indian state of Rajasthan, situated 8 km south of Rupangarh town on Parbatsar - Kishangarh road. This is the place where the Jat folk-deity Tejaji died from a snakebite when he back on the way after fighting with the enemies on 28 August 1103.

== Geography ==
Sursura is located 16 km north from Kishangarh on Parbatsar Road. It has Rupangarh in its north, Kishangarh in south and Harmara in east. It has an average elevation of 416 meters (1365 ft).

Sursura has a hot semi-arid climate. March to July are summer months and the temperature goes up to 45 °C. The winter months of October to February are mild and pleasant, with minimum temperature 0°, and with little or no humidity.

== Infrastructure ==
There is gau shala. There are four government schools in Sursura. There is also a Dharamshala in front of tejaji's Temple in which life of Tejaji is depicted, as well as Dadu's Temple and Tejaji's Temple.

== Demography ==
Sursura is home of 1100 families and population of about 8,000. Majority of population are Hindus and small minority is Muslim and Sindhi. Marwari and Hindi are majorly spoken languages.

== Transport ==
The village is centrally located. State Highway 7 links Kishangarh and Parbatsar, passes through Sursura. It is also connected to Harmara. Bus service is operated from the bus stand situated at main entrance.

== See also ==
- Tejaji
- Paner
- Kharnal
