= Veer Teja =

Indian folk deity (1074–1103)

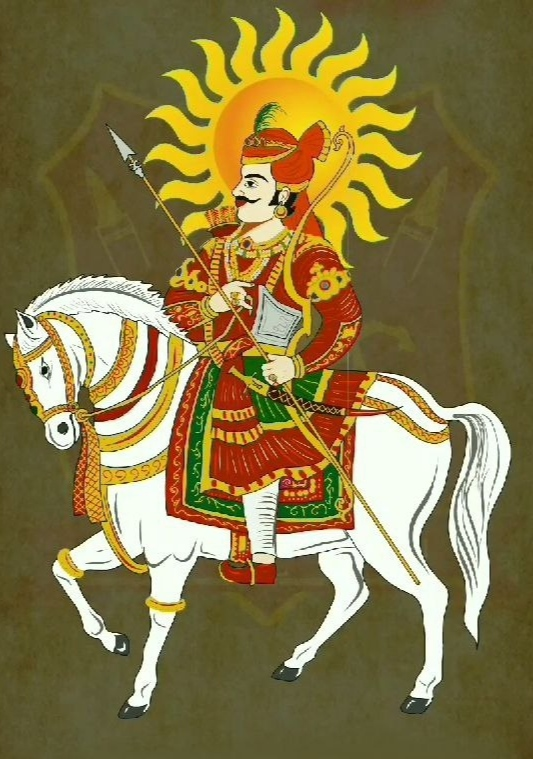
- Veer Teja riding his Leelan
- Affiliation: Avatar of Shiva
- Weapon: Spear
- Animals: Leelan (mare)
- Gender: Male
- Festivals: Teja Dashmi

Genealogy
- Born: 29 January 1074; Kharnal, Nagaur (now in Rajasthan, India)
- Died: 28 August 1103 (aged 29); Sursura, Ajmer
- Parents: Tahar Dev (father); Ram Kunwari (mother)
- Siblings: Rajal (sister)
- Spouse: Pemal

Veer Teja (29 January 1074 - 28 August 1103) also known as Tejaji Maharaj, or simply Tejaji, was a great warrior, social reformer, cow protector and folk-deity in Rajasthan. In rural parts of northern Rajasthan, he is revered as a deity and is considered to be one of Shiva's eleven primary incarnations. He is mainly worshipped in the states of Rajasthan, Madhya Pradesh, Haryana, Uttar Pradesh, and Gujarat. He is commonly known as the God of Snakes in Rajasthan, because it protect against snake bites or also worshipped as Dhauliya Veer.

== Early life ==
As per historians, he was born on Friday, Magha Shukla 14 samvat 1130 (29 January 1074) in the family of Tahar Dev Jat, Jat chieftain in Kharnal, Nagaur and Ram Kunwari in Kharnal village of Nagaur district in Rajasthan.

As per the historians, it is believed that Ram Kunwari, Teja mother, got a boon from Nagaraja and gave birth to a baby named, Teja. His parents were worshippers of Shiva.

== Story ==
=== Halsotia: The Sacred Duty ===
In the rural heartland of Rajasthan, tradition dictated that the chieftain Teja, must initiate the ploughing of fields after the first monsoon rains in the month of Jyestha. This ritual, known as “halsotia,” held immense significance. Tejajembraced this duty with unwavering determination, ready to turn the soil and honour age-old customs.

=== Bhabhi’s Taunts and the Quest for Pemal ===
Teja’s mother urged him to perform the ploughing, known as Halsotia, because his father and brother were out of village due to some work. So, Teja started ploughing his fields and his sister-in-law was responsible for bringing him food in fields during ploughing (locally known as “Chhak”), one day she arrived late. Frustrated, Teja’s anger flared when she taunted him about his wife’s absence- Pemal (Teja wife) was still at her father’s home. Determined to rectify this perceived shame, Teja resolved to retrieve his wife from her in-laws’ abode. Before bringing Pemal back, Teja faced another task: reuniting with his sister, Rajal. Pemal had requested that Rajal be there to welcome her.

=== War with Meenas ===
When Teja was on his way to bring his sister, Rajal back he encountered some meena dacoits. In fight Teja emerged victorious and proceeded to Tabiji, Ajmer, securing permission from his sister’s husband, to bring Rajal back to Kharnal.

=== Journey to Paner ===
When Teja arrived at his in-laws house, he found his mother-in-law was busy in milking cows. His entry on his leelan mare startled the animals, disrupting their peaceful routine. Unfortunately, his mother-in-law failed to recognise him because Teja was married to Pemal when he was only nine months old. Teja's mother-in-law gave Teja a curse that he would be bitten by a black snake for disturbing her cows.

Teja’s anger flared, and he decided to return to Kharnal without Pemal. However, Pemal was upset by her mother's reaction and requested that her father and brother stop Teja. Lachha Gujari, Pemal’s friend, stepped forward and shared the story of Pemal’s suffering to Teja. Then Teja stayed at Lachha’s Gujari house, where he met Pemal for the first time.

=== Lachha Cows Incident ===
When Teja and Pemal are talking to each other at Lachha House, a knock is echoed by Lachha Gujari. Lachha urgently informed Teja that the Meenas from Chang had stolen all her cows and requested help from Teja. Without hesitation, Teja mounted his Leelan and rode off alone to confront the dacoits who had taken Lachha's cows.

When Teja was on his way to confront the dacaits, Basak Naag, a snake, was burning in the fire, and he saved him from burning. That snake cursed and wanted to bite him. Teja assured that he would come back after taking Lachha cows back.After that, he fought with the Meenas in the valley of Chang, about 15 km from Sursura. He killed all 350 Meenas in the fight and got back the cows of Lachha Gujari.

=== Death of Teja Ji ===
Teja, after returning cows to Lachha, produced himself before Basak Naga, the snake, and asked the snake to bite his body. Basak Naga did not find any unwounded places on Teja's body, and then Teja asked him to bite on his tongue. Basak Naga gave a boon to Teja that he will be a deity of Kalyug and will be worshipped. That’s why Teja is also called a man of words. Teja died on Bhadrapada Shukla Dashmi Saturday, V.S. 1160, or 28 August 1103 at the age of 29. The date of the martyrdom of Teja is celebrated as Teja Dashmi.

Teja is also known as God of Snakes, because of this when anyone gets bitten by snake, then there are rituals to visit Tejaji temple and seek blessings from Teja. Apart from being called as God of Snakes, Teja was also a great protector of cows.

== Commemoration ==
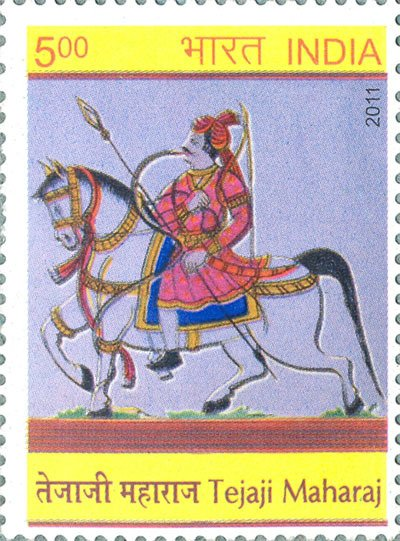
India Post, Government of India releases commemorative postage stamp of Veer Teja

Teja Dashami is a festival celebrated in Rajasthan and Madhya Pradesh on the Dashami Tithi (tenth day) of the Shukla Paksha (bright fortnight of the Moon) in the month of Bhadrapada. The occasion commemorates the life and sacrifice of Teja, who is revered as a folk-deity and hailed for his commitment to truth and promise.

In September 2011, India Post issued a commemorative postage stamp depicting Teja. The Government of Rajasthan later constituted the Rajasthan State Veer Tejaji Welfare Board for Farmers, comprising seven members including a chairman and vice-chairman. The board is tasked with reviewing the socio-economic conditions of farmers and recommending measures to address their backwardness.

Teja’s life has also been depicted in cultural media. A Rajasthani-language film titled Veer Tejaji was produced in the 1980s. In November 2023, Prime Minister Narendra Modi visited the Tejaji Temple at Kharnal village, Nagaur, Rajasthan, to pay homage to the folk deity.

== Personal life ==
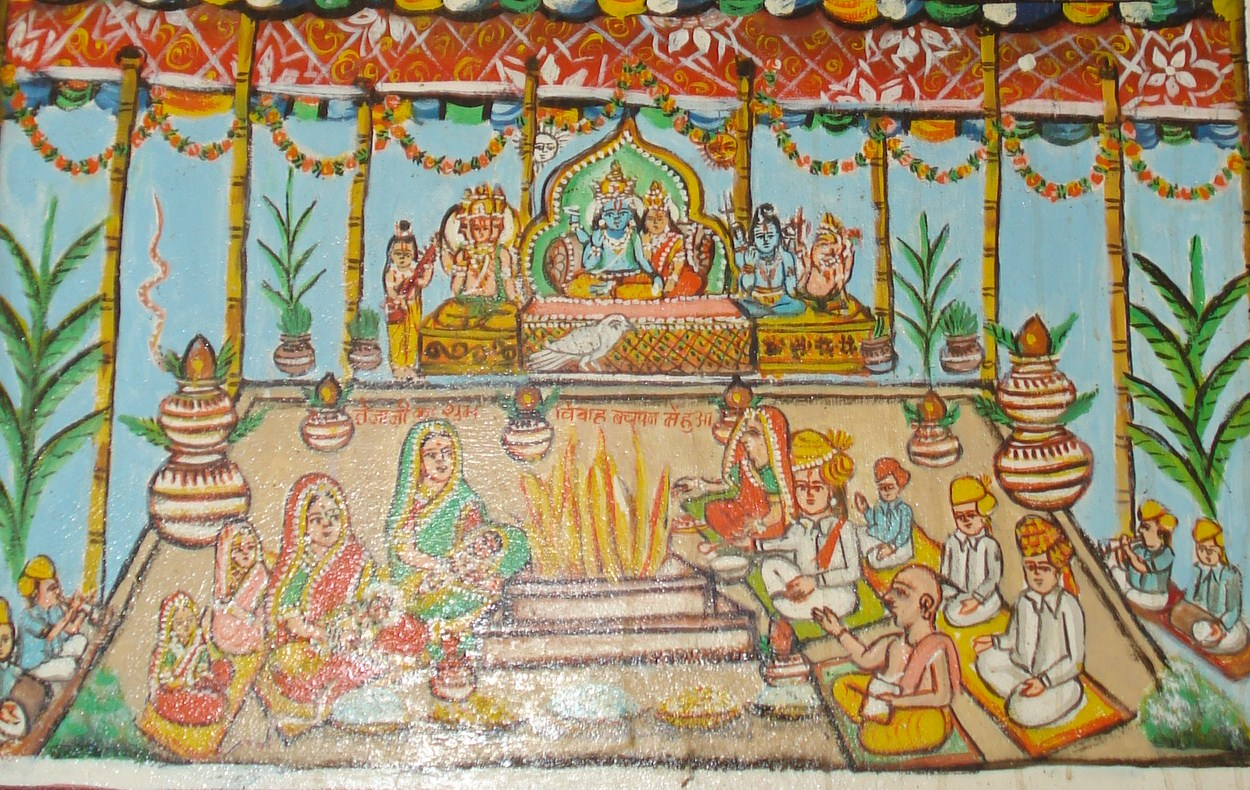
Veer Teja's marriage in Pushkar, Rajasthan

Teja married Pemal, daughter of Raimal, chieftain of Paner village in the Ajmer district of Rajasthan. He was just nine months old at the time of marriage, while Pemal was six months old, and they got married at Pushkar Ghat on Pushkar Purnima in 1074. His wife, Pemal, and his sister, Rajal, practised sati pratha when Tejaji sacrificed his life for cows.

== Gallery ==
This section includes pictures of some temples dedicated to Veer Teja.

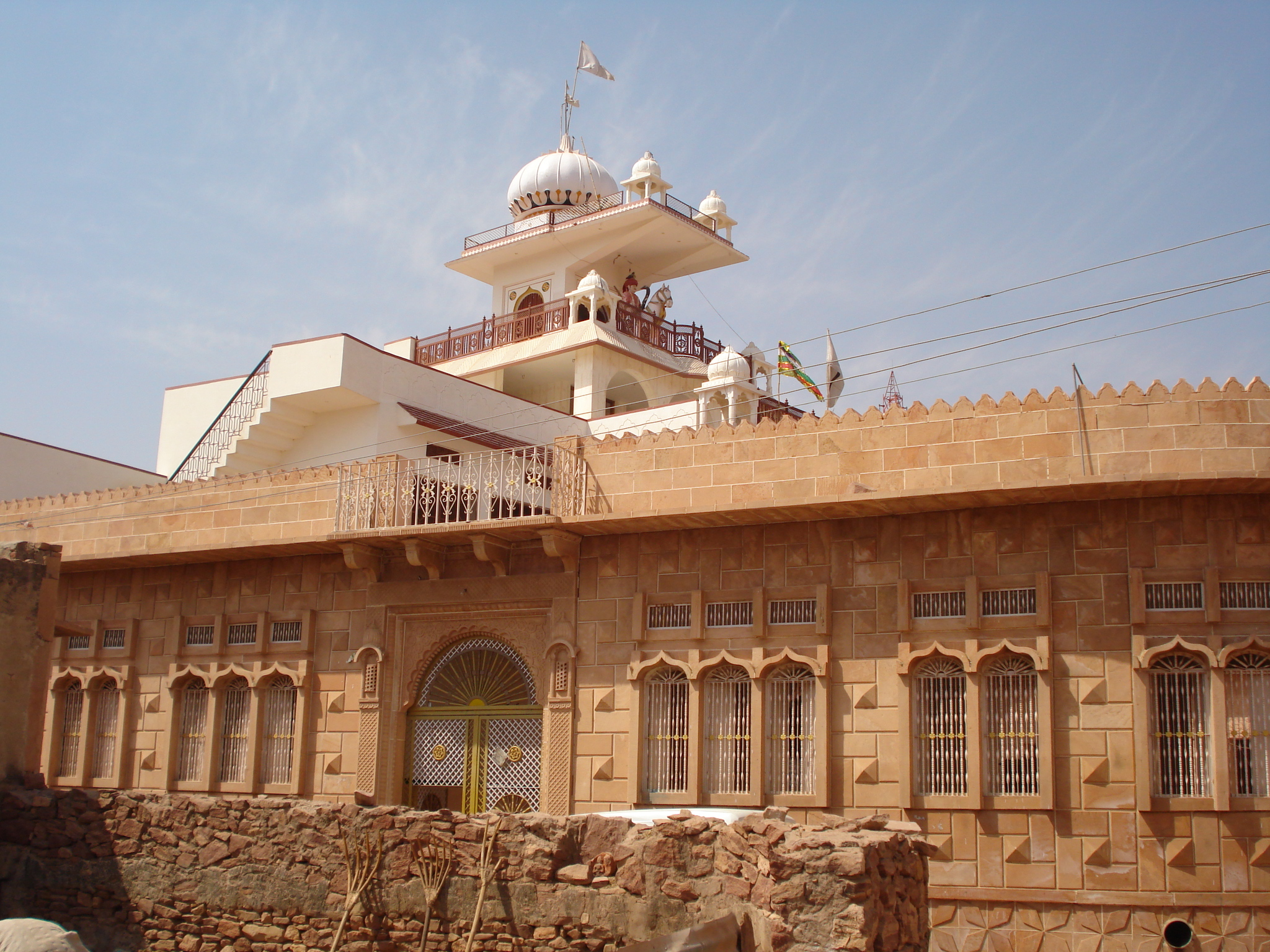
Tejaji temple at Kharnal, Nagaur, Rajasthan

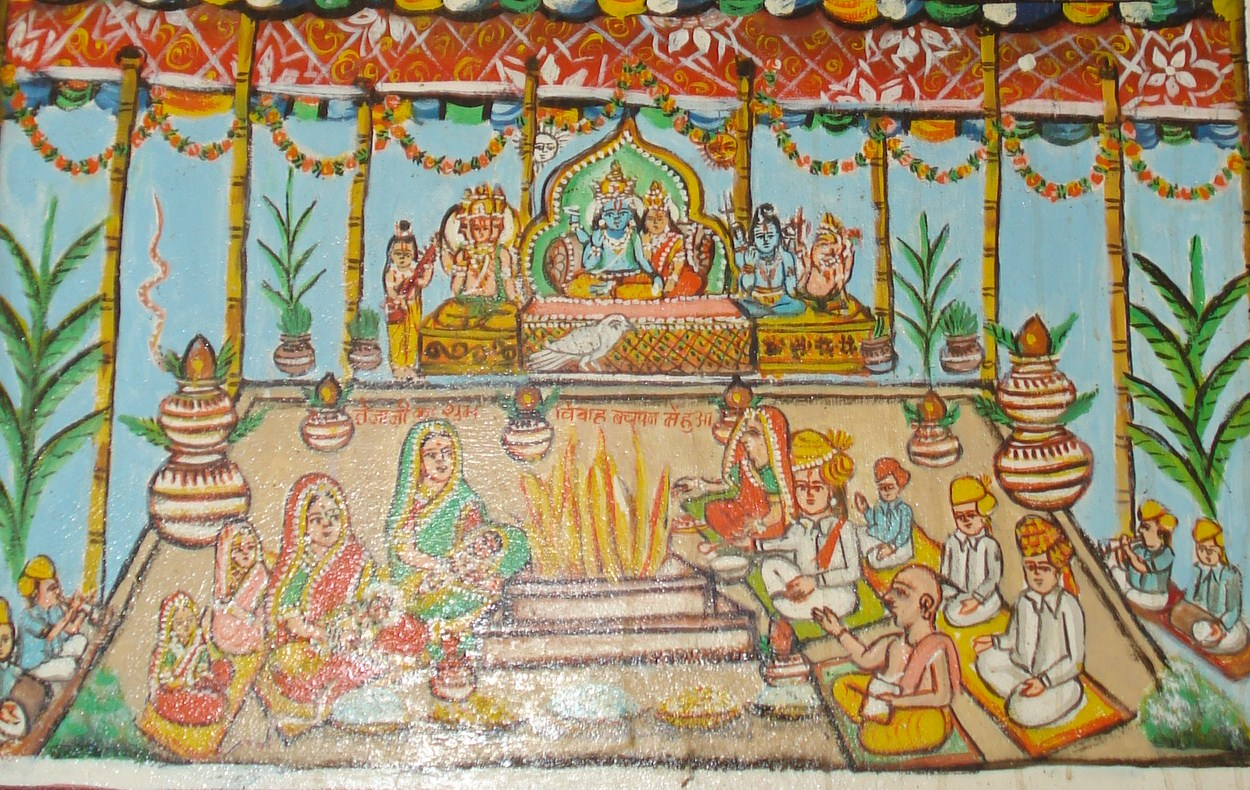
Painting depicting Veer Teja's marriage in Pushkar, Rajasthan

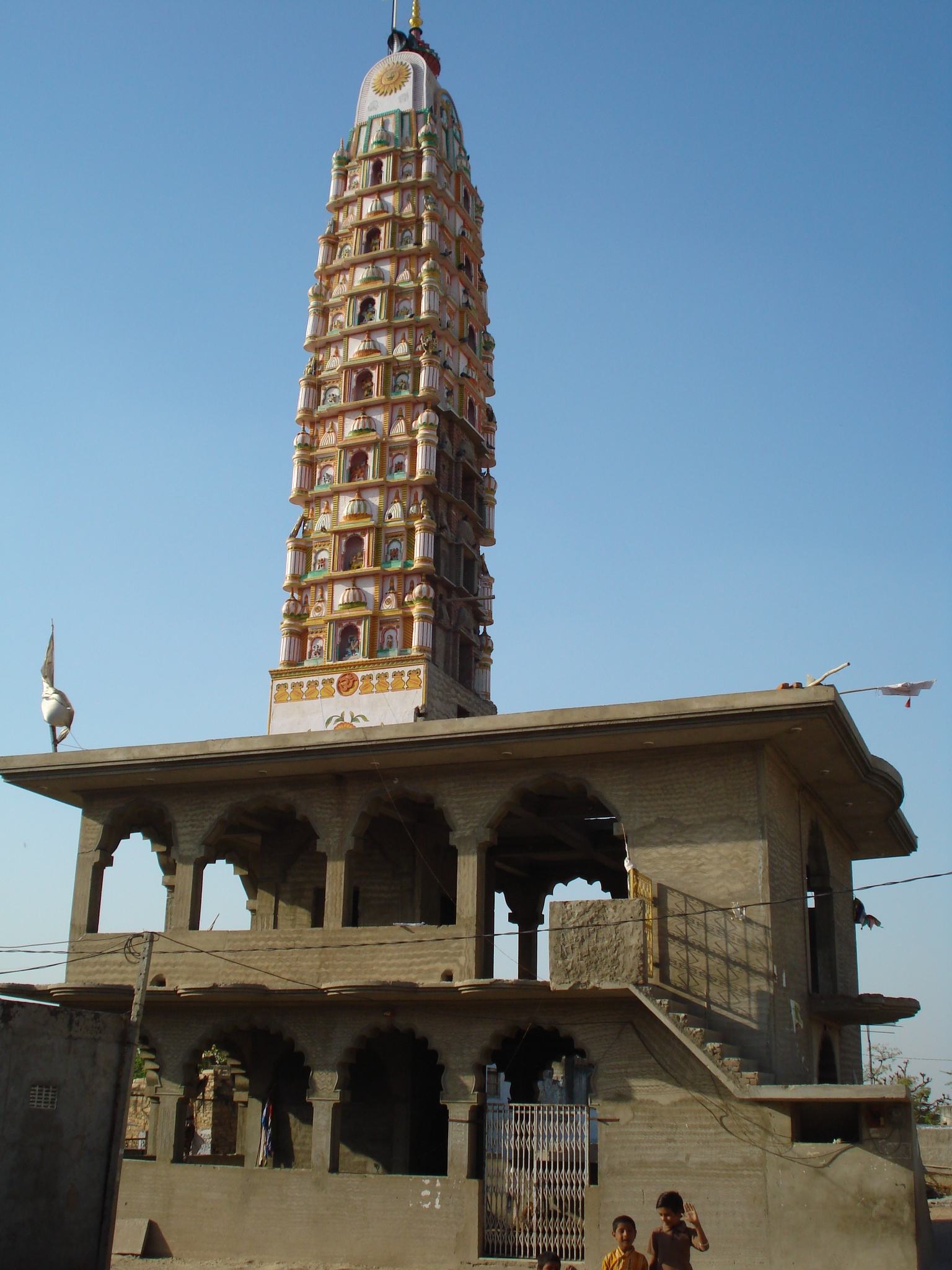
Teja Dham at his death place in Sursura, Ajmer

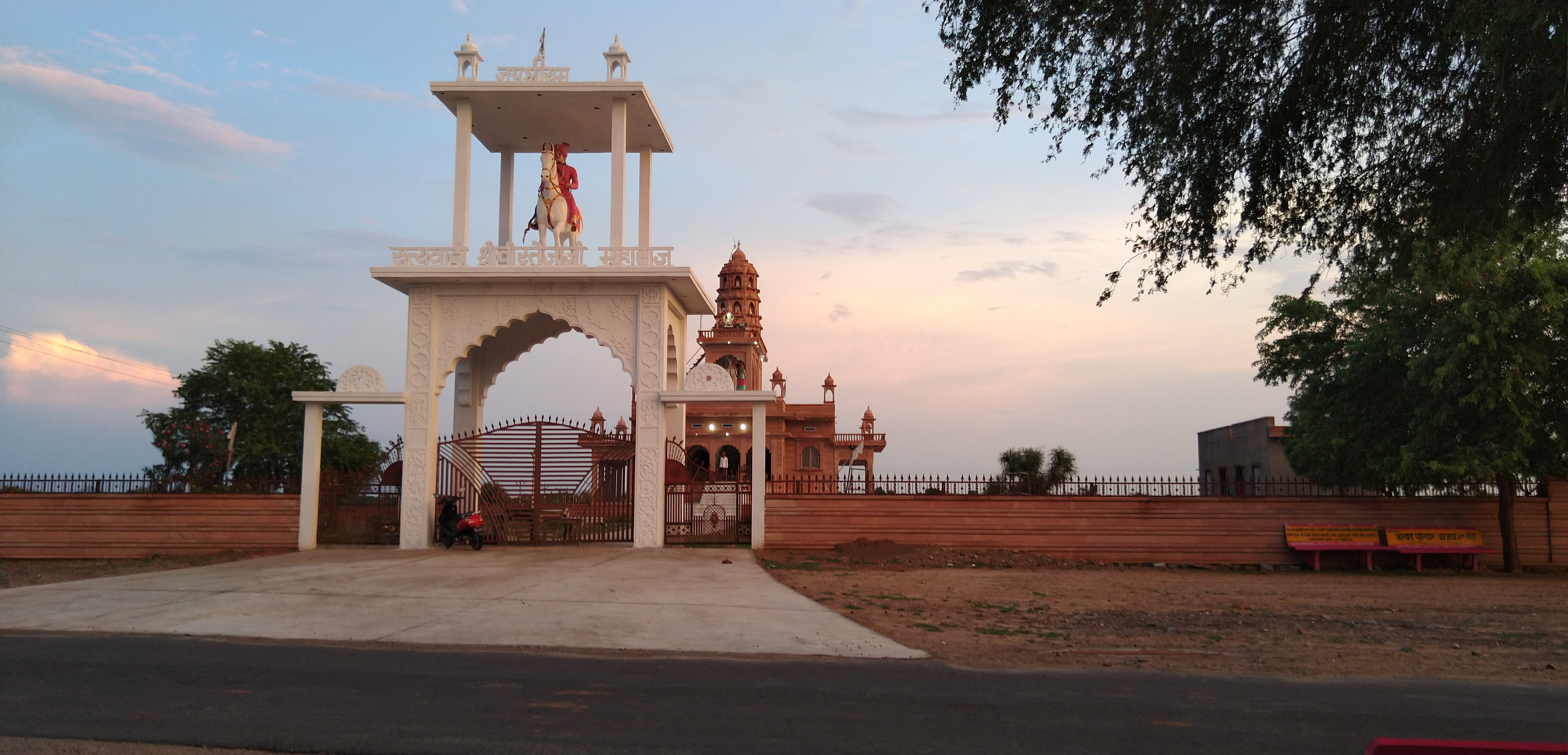
Tejaji temple at Palot village
