= Bankia (instrument) =

Traditional Indian wind instrument

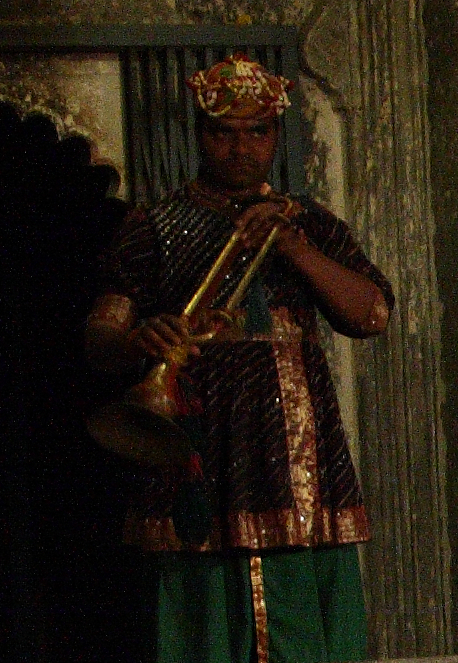
- A musician plays the Bankia during the Udaipur Chari dance

Brass
- Other names: Bankiya
- Classification: Aerophone
- Hornbostel–Sachs classification: 423.1 (Natural trumpet)
- Developed: Rajasthan, India
- Timbre: Powerful, resonant
- Volume: Loud
- Attack: Sharp
- Decay: Gradual

Musicians
- Bhopas, Dhadhi community

The Bankia is a traditional wind instrument from Rajasthan, India. It is made of bronze. It consists of a bugle-like tube and a saucer-shaped bell with an integrated mouthpiece. It produces powerful sound. It is commonly used during folk performances like the Chari and Kachchhi Ghodi dances.

Bankia is also commonly played during weddings, religious ceremonies, and processions in Rajasthan. In earlier times, it was used to signal the arrival of royalty, and this association with grand occasions has continued over the years. It continues to be an important part of cultural and ceremonial events, particularly in folk performances.

== See also ==
- Music of India
- Musical instruments of Rajasthan
- List of Indian musical instruments
