= The Hungry Stones =

1895 short story by Rabindranath Tagore

- Short story by Rabindranath Tagore
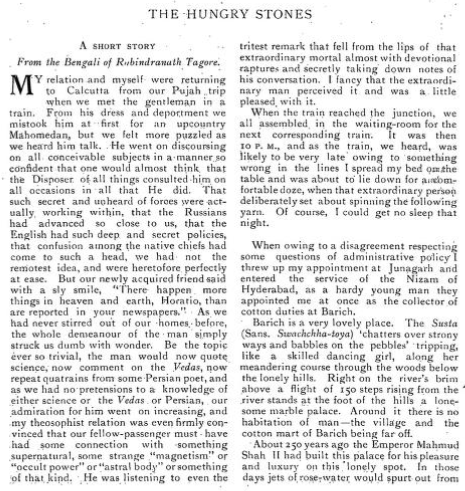
- The first page of "The Hungry Stones" as it appeared in The Modern Review in 1910.

Text available at Wikisource
- Original title: Kshudhita Pashan; Khudito Pashan
- Country: India
- Language: Bengali

Publication
- Publication date: 1895

"The Hungry Stones" (Bengali: Kshudhita Pashan or Khudito Pashan) is a Bengali short story written by Rabindranath Tagore in 1895. The story is about a tax collector who is sent to a small town and stays at a former palace which is believed to be haunted. Every night, he becomes more consumed by the spirits of the inhabitants of the palace from the Mughal times and a beautiful Persian woman.

== Background ==
Tagore was inspired to write this story after he had stayed in Shah Jahan's Moti Shahi Mahal palace Shahibaug, Ahmedabad, Gujarat, situated near the Sabarmati River (in the story this became the Shusta River). This was where Tagore's elder brother, Satyendranath, was serving as a judge at the time.

== Plot summary ==
While returning to Calcutta from a pilgrimage, the narrator and his theosophist companion meet a mysterious but captivating man on the train. The three disembark at a junction and, while waiting for a delayed connection, the man begins to tell them about his past.

In his tale, told as a story within a story, the mysterious man takes a post as a cotton tax collector in Barich. He stays in an abandoned marble palace built 250 years prior by Emperor Muhammad Shah II. Though warned never to spend the night there, he moves in. Isolated and eerie, the palace begins to affect him. He hears ghostly footsteps, glimpses spectral figures, and senses the presence of past lives—especially that of a veiled Persian woman. He starts to feel the palace is slowly consuming him. Night after night, he experiences increasingly vivid visions: women laughing, fountains splashing, music, scents, and encounters with spectral beings. These episodes become more immersive, blurring the boundary between dream and reality. When eventually he resolves to escape, however, the man finds himself unable to leave. An old clerk, Karim Khan, explains that the palace is cursed—haunted by unfulfilled desires and passions that have made its very stones "hungry." When asked how to break the spell, the clerk begins to tell the story of a young Persian girl.

Returning to the frame narrative, the mysterious man's story is interrupted when the train arrives and he departs in a first-class carriage. The original narrator and his companion never hear the end of the tale, and—in the end—it is unclear whether the mysterious man's experience was pure fiction, a supernatural encounter, or a descent into madness.

== Adaptations ==
The story has been adapted a number of times as listed below:

- Kshudhita Pashan by Tapan Sinha, 1960 Bengali film
- Lekin... by Gulzar, 1991 Hindi film

== Other ghost stories by Tagore ==
Tagore wrote several other ghost stories, including The Skeleton, Lost Jewels, In the Middle of the Night, and False Hope.

== See also ==
- List of works of Rabindranath Tagore
