= Chari Dance =

Folk dance in the Indian state of Rajasthan

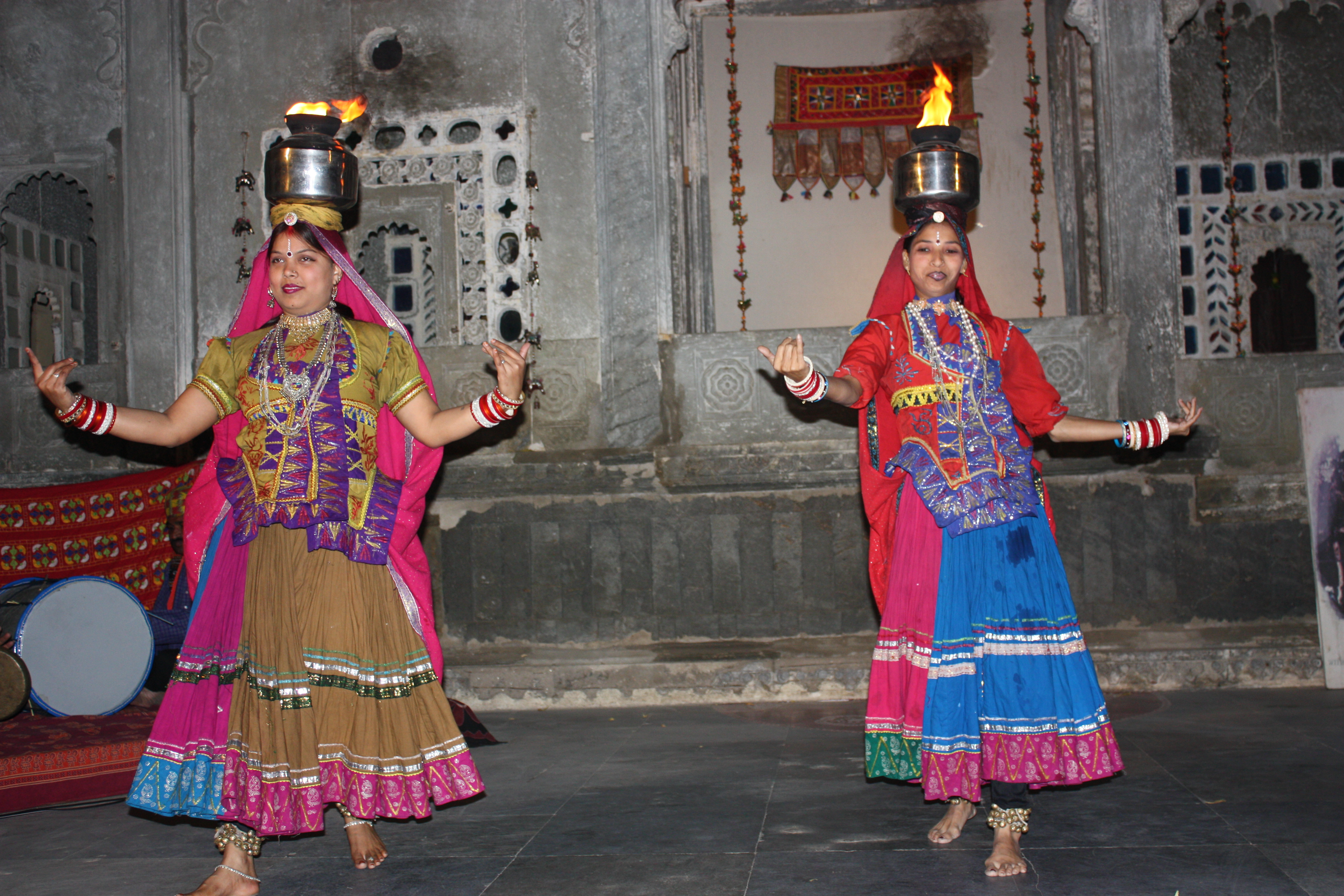
- Chari dance costume
- Genre: Folk dance
- Instruments: Dholak; Nagada; Harmonium; Bankia; Thali
- Origin: Rajasthan, India

Chari dance is a folk dance in the Indian state of Rajasthan. Chari dance is a female group dance. It is related to Ajmer and Kishangarh. Chari dance is prominent in Gurjar community of Kishangarh and Ajmer and known all over Rajasthan. The Chari dance is performed at marriage celebrations, on the birth of a male child and at celebrations and festivals of goodness.

== Performance ==
During the Chari dance, colorfully dressed, bejeweled women hold earthenware or brass Chari pots on their heads. Often, the Chari are set on lit Diya (oil lamp) or fire with cotton seeds immersed in oil. Dancers carry a flaming pot on their head without touching it, while performing graceful movements of limbs and deep swirls of knees. To make the dance look more attractive lines of lighted patterns are created as the dancers move quietly around the floor.

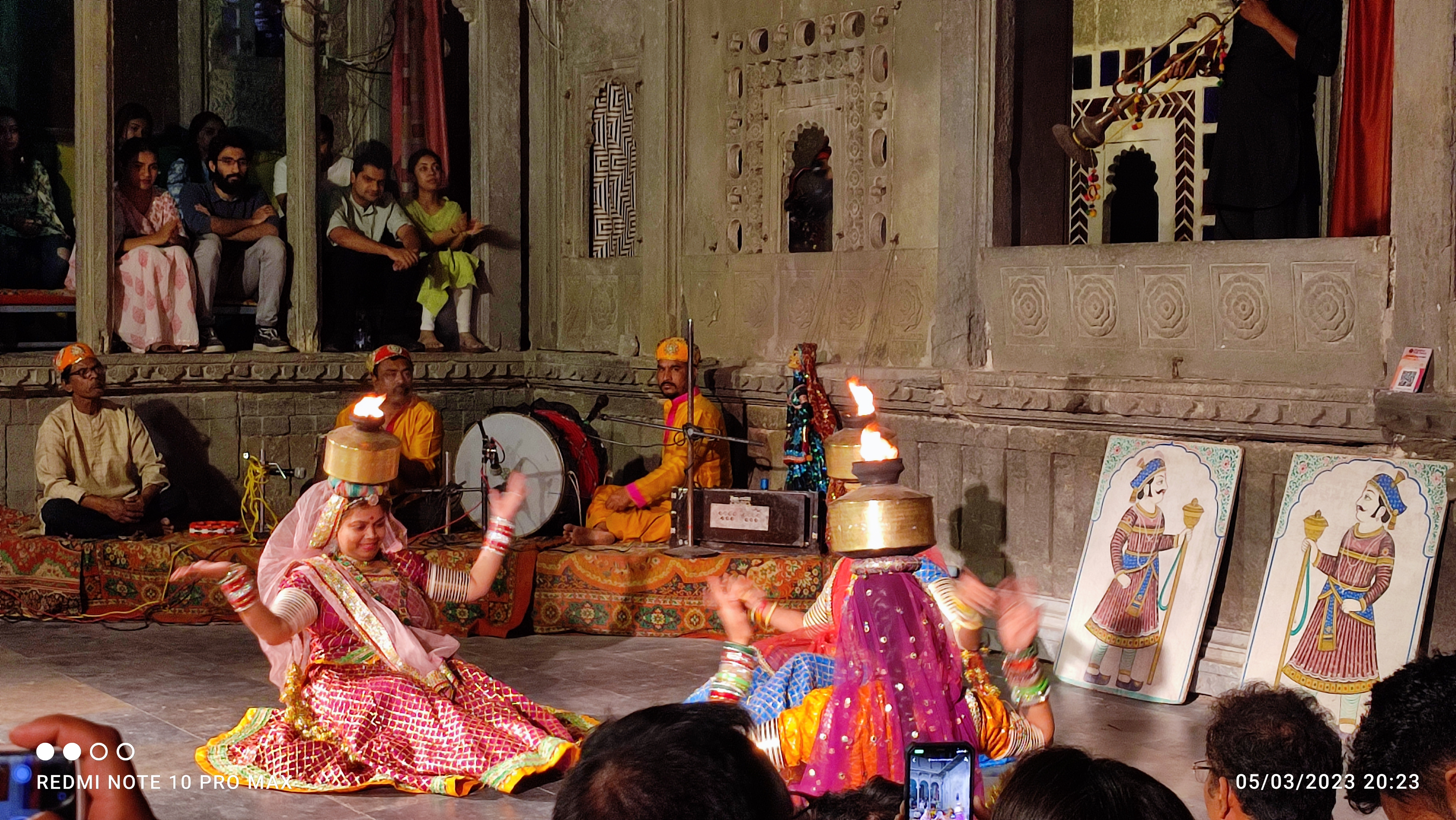
Chari_dance_in_bagore_ki_haveli

== Origin ==
Rajasthan is a desert where women walk for many miles to collect water for their families. They collect their daily water in Chari. The dance celebrates this lifelong ritual of collecting water.

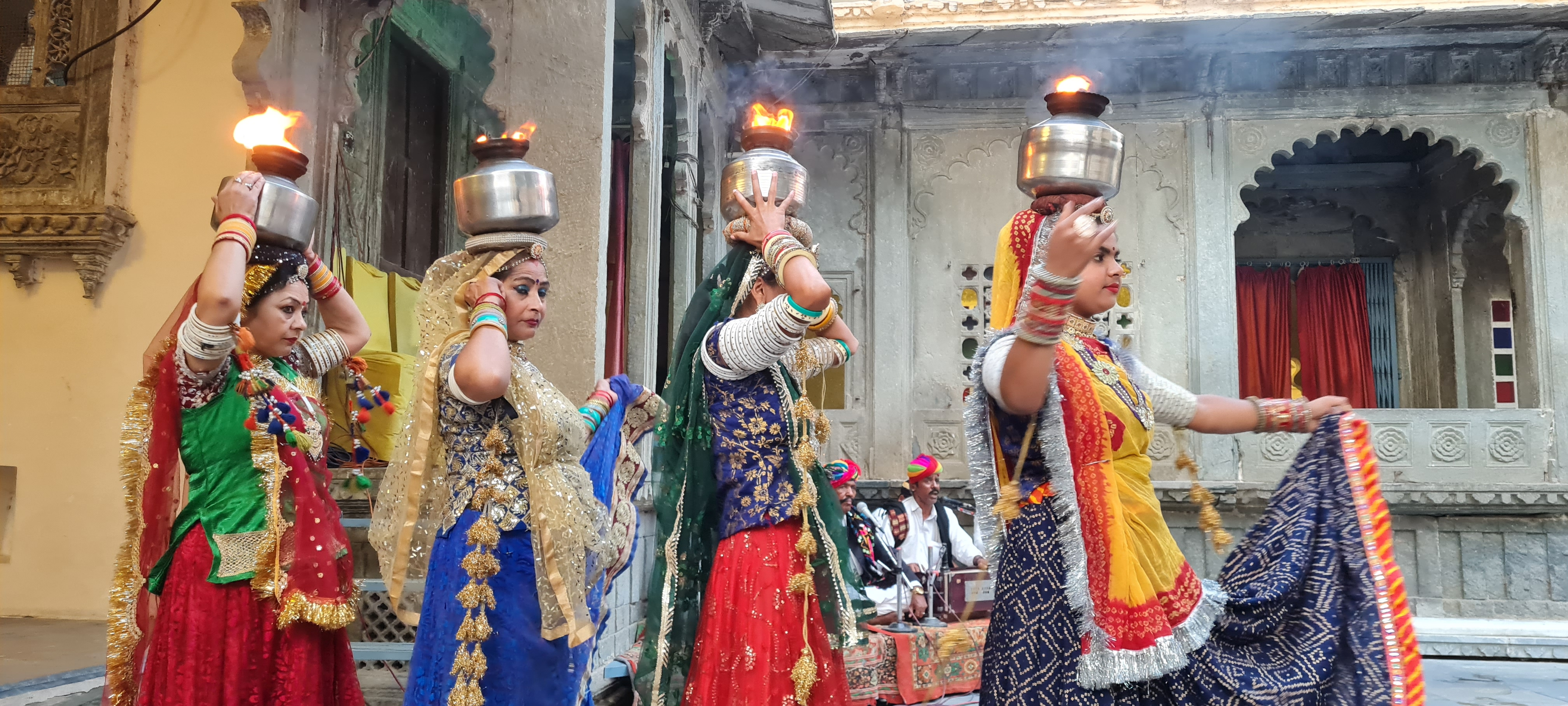
Chari_Dance

== Dress and ornaments ==
Dancers wear Rajasthani golden ornaments named Hansli, Hansli, Timniya, Mogri, Punchi, Bangdi, Gajra, Armlets, Karli, Kanka and Navr.

== Instruments ==
Chari dance is played with Nagada, Dholak, Dhol Harmonium, Thali (an autophonic instrument) and Bankia. Bankia is the most common. It produces a powerful, eerie sound in dexterous hands.

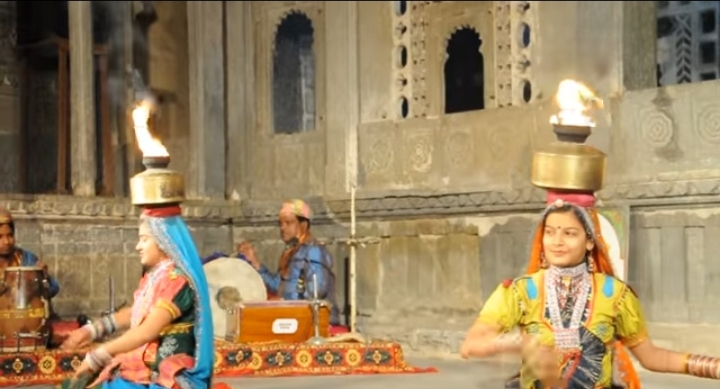
It is famous Gujar women of rajasthan.In this dance, cotton seed, are burnt inside the pot and the dance is performed.
