= Kesariya Balam =

Single by Allah Jilai Bai
- Genre: Folk

Kesariya Balam is an Indian folk song from Rajasthan. It is one of the most popular Rajasthani folk music narrations. The song is sung in Mand singing style.

== In popular culture ==
Earliest available recording of this song wrote by unknown and sung by singer Allah Jilai Bai.It was first sung by {MANGIBAI[UDAIPUR]}.The song was also used in Hindi film, Lekin... (1991) set in Rajasthan, as Kesariya Baalma, in which it was sung by Lata Mangeshkar, set to music by Hridaynath Mangeshkar . It was used in Hindi film Dor. It was also used in the title of TV series, Kesariya Balam Aavo Hamare Des (2009).
