= Lakshmi Kumari Chundawat =

Indian author and politician

Rani Lakshmi Kumari Chundawat
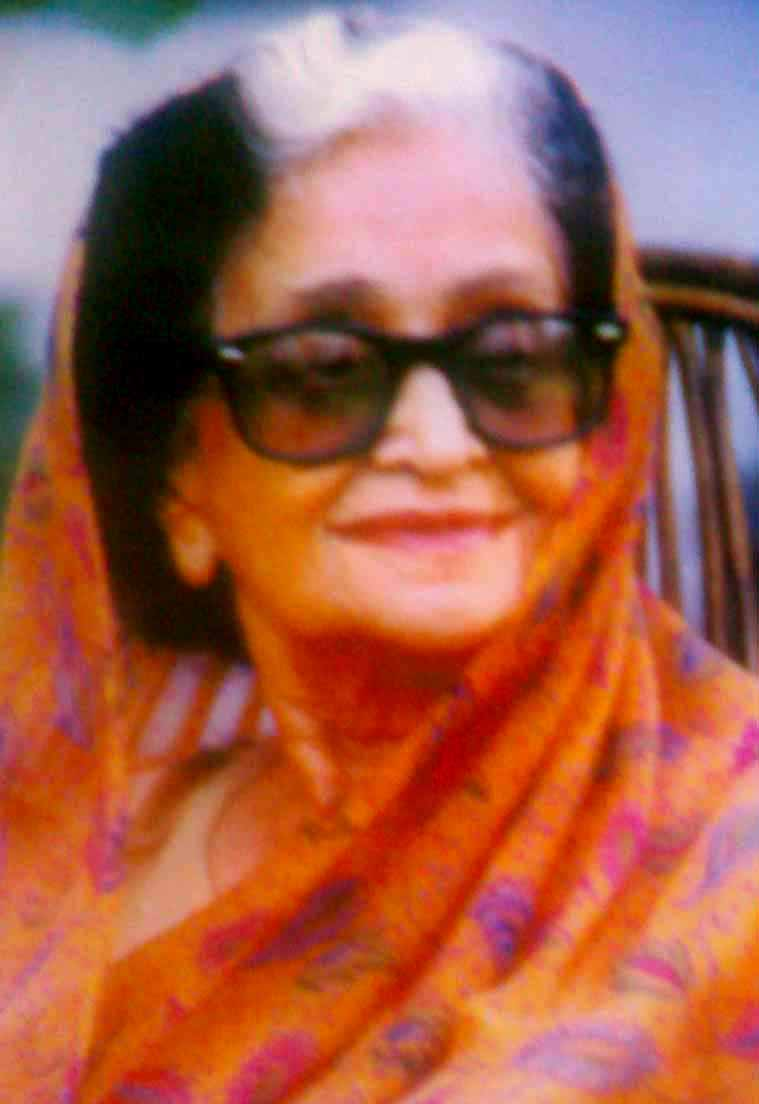

Member of the Rajasthan Legislative Assembly
- In office 1962–1972
- Constituency: Bhim, Rajasthan

President of the Rajasthan Pradesh Congress Committee
- In office 1971–1972
- Succeeded by: Parasram Maderna

Member of the Rajya Sabha
- In office 1972–1978
- Constituency: Rajasthan

Personal details
- Born: 24 June 1916; Deogarh, Rajasthan
- Died: 24 May 2014 (aged 97); Jaipur, Rajasthan
- Political party: Indian National Congress
- Spouse: Rawat Tej Singh (m. 1934)
- Occupation: Author, politician, scholar
- Awards: Padma Shri (1984); Rajasthan Ratna (2012)

Lakshmi Kumari Chundawat (24 June 1916 – 24 May 2014) was a veteran Indian politician, author, and scholar. She is known for her contributions to the Rajasthani literature and her role in Rajasthan politics. She was Member of Parliament in the Rajya Sabha from 1972 to 1978 from Rajasthan. She served as president of the Rajasthan Pradesh Congress Committee (RPCC) from 1971 to 1972. She was also elected to the Rajasthan Legislative Assembly for two terms representing Bhim constituency from 1962 to 1972. She was a member of the Indian National Congress. She was awarded with the Padma Shri, fourth highest civilian award in India by the Government of India in 1984 for her contribution to the Rajasthani literature and with Rajasthan Ratna in 2012.

== Early life ==
Chundawat was born on 24 June 1916 in Deogarh, a prominent thikana (feudal estate) in the princely state of Mewar, Rajasthan. She married Rawat Tej Singh of Rawatsar, a chief in the former Bikaner state, becoming the Rani of Rawatsar. Although initially bound by the purdah system, she later abandoned it with the encouragement of her husband and family, marking the beginning of her transition from a sheltered life to one of public service.

== Political career ==
Chundawat entered politics in 1962, joining the Indian National Congress and as one of Rajasthan’s first female politicians. She was elected to the Rajasthan Legislative Assembly from Bhim, Deogarh (1962–1971) and later served as a member of the Rajya Sabha (1972–1978). During her tenure, she briefly held the position of president of the Rajasthan Pradesh Congress Committee from 1971 to 1972.

== Books ==
Rani Lakshmi Kumari's books include:

- From Purdah to the people: Memoirs of Padma Shri Rani Laxmi Kumari Chundawat
- Folklore of Rajasthan
- Samskrtika Rajasthan
- Mumal
- Devnarayan Bgdawat Mahagatha
- Mumal
- Lenin ri Jeevani
- Hindukush ke Us Paar
- Shanti ke Liye Sangharsha
- Antardhvani
- Rajasthan ke Ritee Rivaj
- के रे चकवा बात
- हुकारो दो सा
- गजबन
- माँजल रात
- पाबूजी री बात
- गिर ऊँचा- ऊँचा गढ़ा
- अमोलक बातां
- टाबरा री बाता
- बगड़aवात
