= Yaara Seeli Seeli =

1991 Indian Hindi song

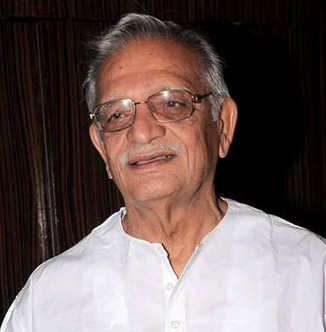
- Gulzar, the lyricist of the song

Song by Lata Mangeshkar
- Language: Hindi
- Released: 1990
- Composer: Hridaynath Mangeshkar
- Lyricist: Gulzar

"Yaara Seeli Seeli" (transl. This smouldering night of separation) is an Indian Hindi song from the Bollywood film Lekin... (1990). The lyrics of the song was written by Gulzar. the music was composed by Hridaynath Mangeshkar and Lata Mangeshkar was the playback singer. The song fetched Lata Mangeshkar a national award (best female playback singer) and Gulzar a Filmfare award (best lyrics).

== Theme ==
The song remembers the loved one. Neeraj Sharma in his book Gulzariyat - Gulzar's Songs: Discover What’s Beneath translated the first two lines of this song as: "The night of separation burns slowly like wet wood, neither complete ablaze nor wholly extinguished. It is more painful because this is neither complete death nor complete life, just hung in between."

== Awards ==
The song brought several national awards. Lata Mangeshkar won her third National Film Award for Best Female Playback Singer in 1990 for this song. Gulzar won a Filmfare Award for Best Lyricist (1992).
