= Kharnal =

- Village
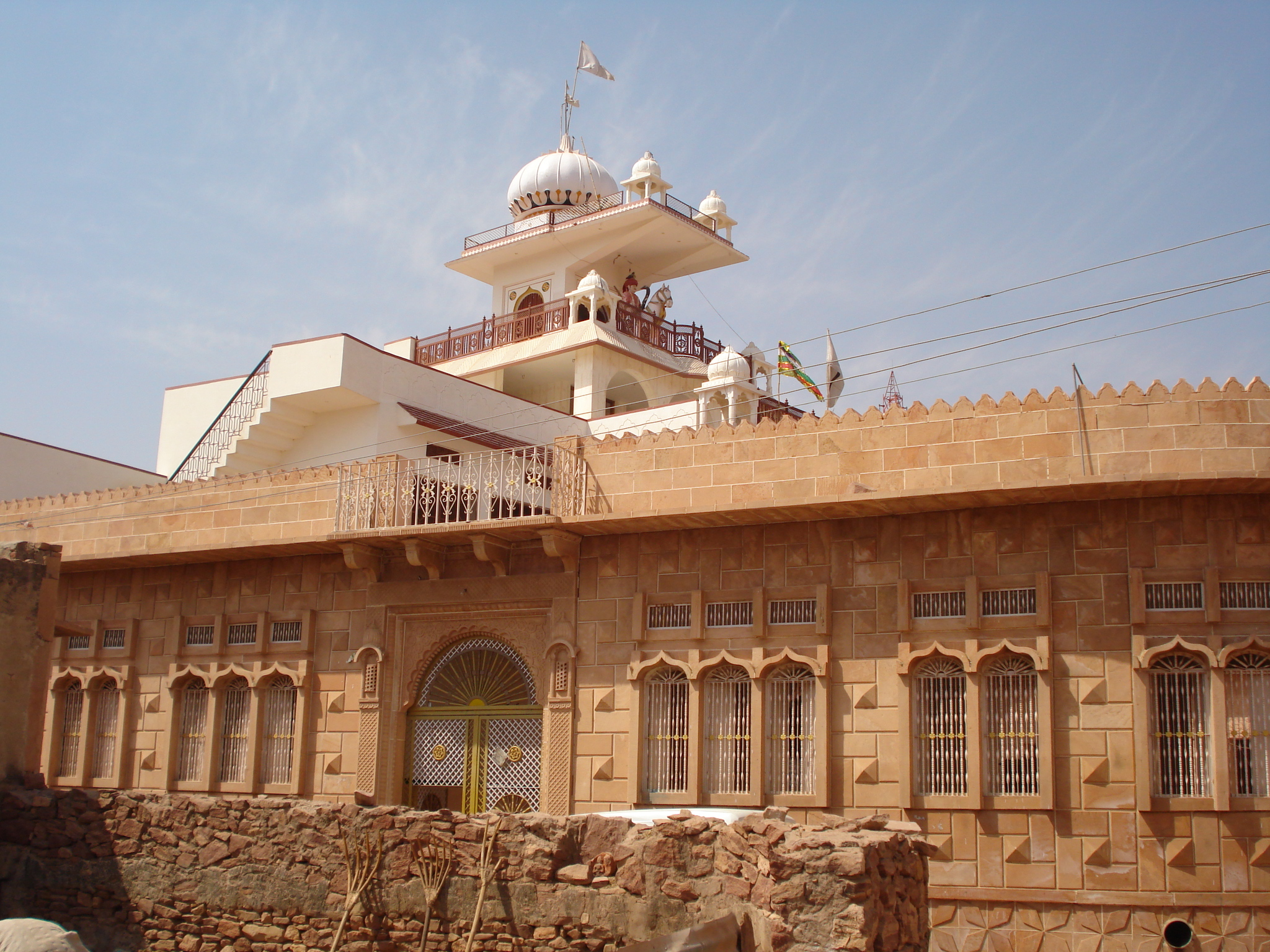
- Tejaji Temple at Kharnal

- Location in Rajasthan, India Kharnal (India)
- Coordinates: 27.08576°N 73.644705°E
- Country: India
- State: Rajasthan
- District: Nagaur

Area
  - Total: 2,650.68 ha (6,550.0 acres)

Population (2011)
  - Total: 2,812
  - Density: 106.1/km^{2} (274.8/sq mi)

Languages
  - Official: Rajasthani; Hindi
- Time zone: UTC+5:30 (IST)
- Postal code: 341001
- ISO 3166 code: RJ-IN
- Vehicle registration: RJ-21

Kharnal is a village in Nagaur district of Rajasthan, India. It is birthplace of popular folk deity Veer Tejaji. He was born in the family of Tahar Dev and Ramkunwari Devi, who were Dhauliya Jats.

== Demography ==
It is the main village of Dhaulya Jats. There are four branches of Dhaulyas descendants of Hema, Dulha, Dhanna and Pipa. Other Jat gotras in the village are Dahiya, Mahiya, Jakhar, Karvir and Benda.

Other castes dwelling in the village are Muslims, Teli, Nayak, Balai, Luhar, Sunar, Brahman and Baniya. There is no Rajput. Kharnal has a total population of 2,812 peoples according to Census 2011.

There is a big temple of Tejaji in Kharnal facing north direction. In the temple there is a brass statue of Tejaji with mukut and kalgi and a bhala in hand. Outside the village there is a small temple of Tejaji at a distance of 1.5 km from big temple. People of this village tell that the statue of Tejaji had come out of soil naturally. This statue is believed to be about 1000 years old. This temple is located in Dhawa johar, the water of which is used for drinking by the villagers.

− Temple of Rajal, sister of Tejaji, who became sati with Tejaji, is situated at a distance of 1 km from village in the east direction.

Kharnal is also a village in Doda district in Jammu and Kashmir.

== See also ==
- Tejaji
- Sursura
- Paner
