= Palot =

- Village
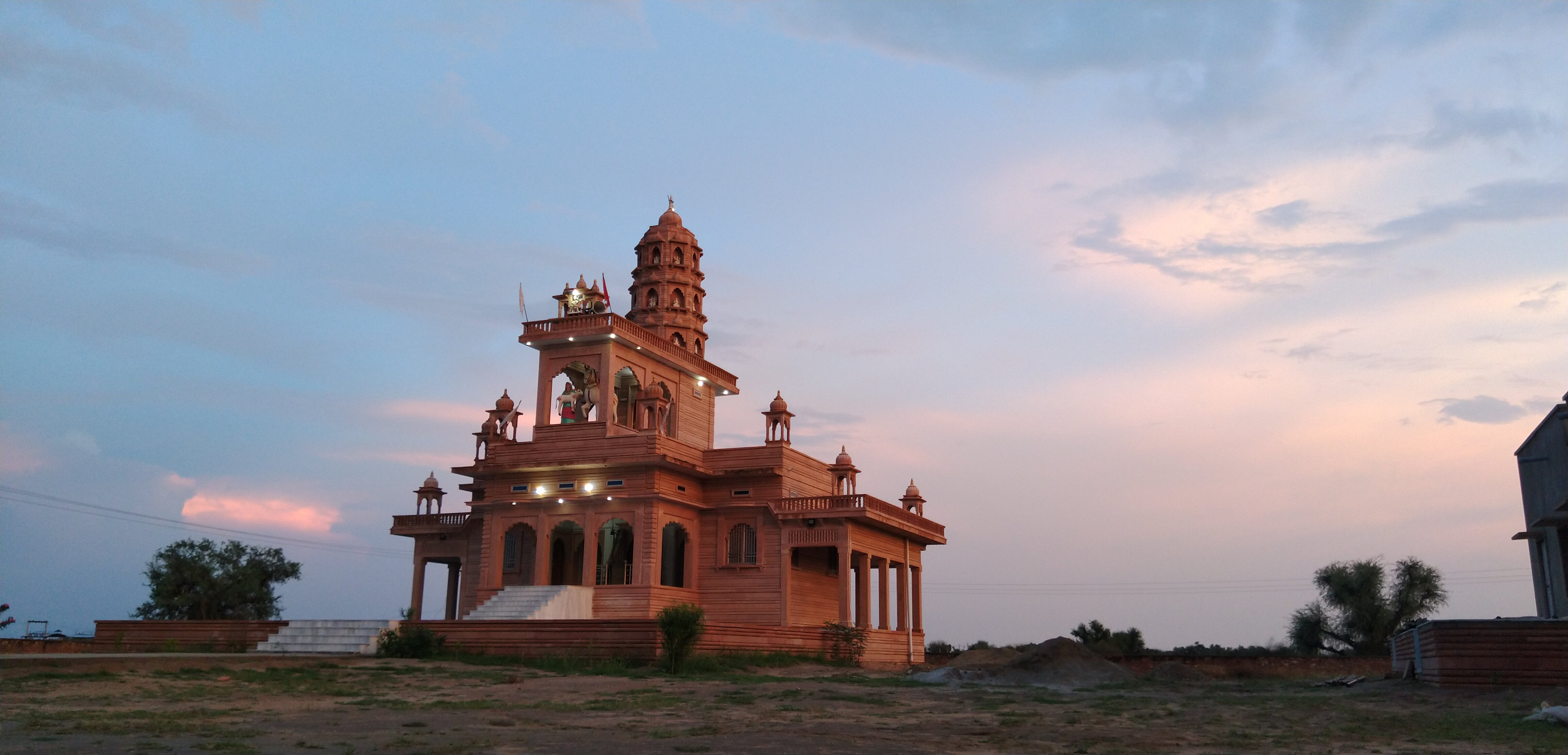
- Veer Tejaji Temple

- Location of Palot in Rajasthan, India Palot (India)
- Coordinates: 27.24°N 74.26°E
- Country: India
- State: Rajasthan
- District: Nagaur
- Named for: Palot

Area
  - Total: 18.1609 km^{2} (7.0120 sq mi)
- Elevation: 1,072 m (3,517 ft)

Population (2019)
  - Total: 2,232
  - Density: 122.9/km^{2} (318.3/sq mi)

Languages
  - Official: Hindi
  - Local: Marwari
- Time zone: UTC+5:30 (IST)
- PIN: 341305
- Vehicle registration: RJ-37
- Website: www.panchayatportals.gov.in/web/40422_palot-gram-panchayat

Palot is a village in Didwana tehsil in Nagaur district of Rajasthan. It is located 85km towards East from district headquarters Nagaur district. 13km from Didwana and 184km from the state capital Jaipur. Pin code is 341305 and postal head office is Koliya.

== Gallery ==
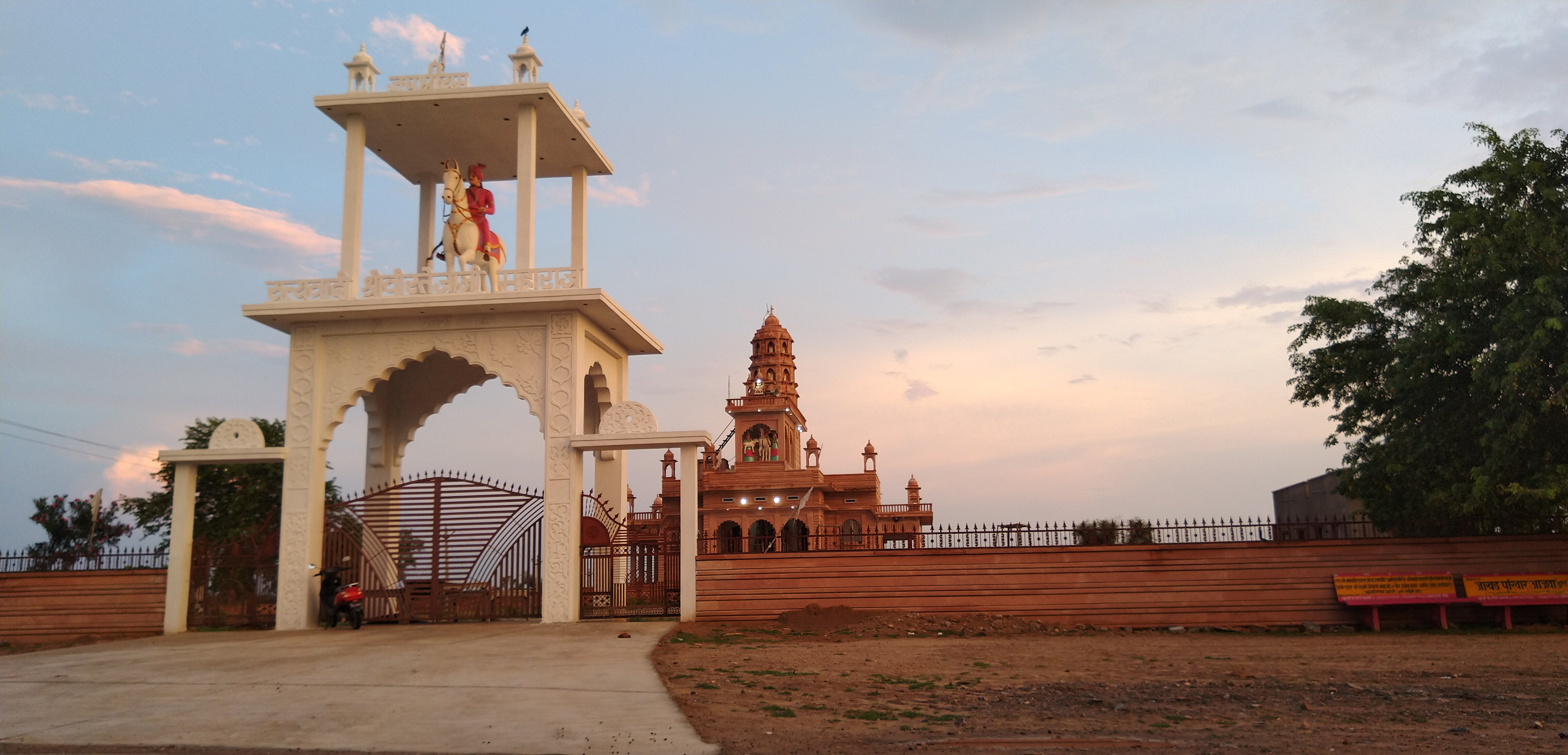
Veer Tejaji Temple

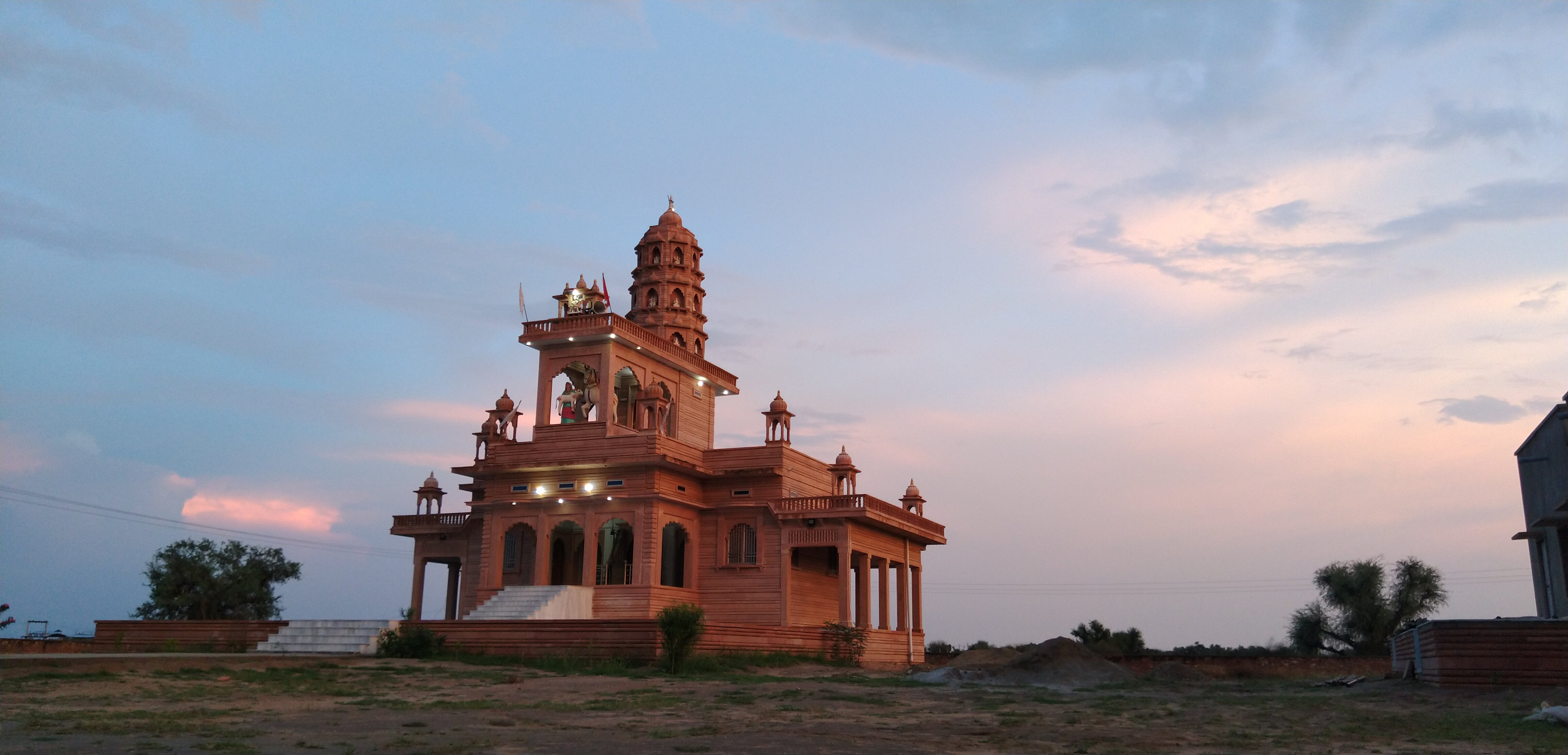
Veer Tejaji Temple

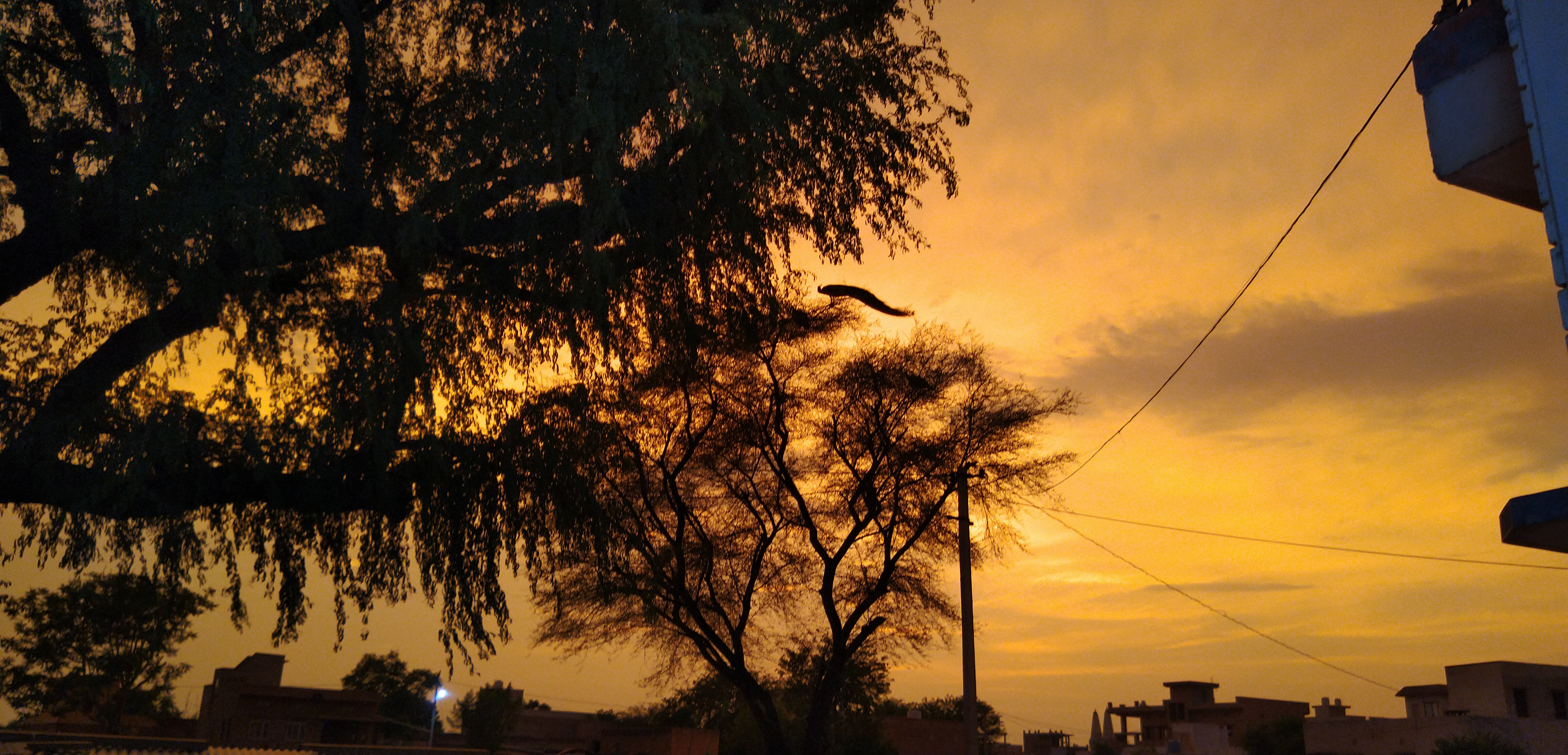
Sunset view

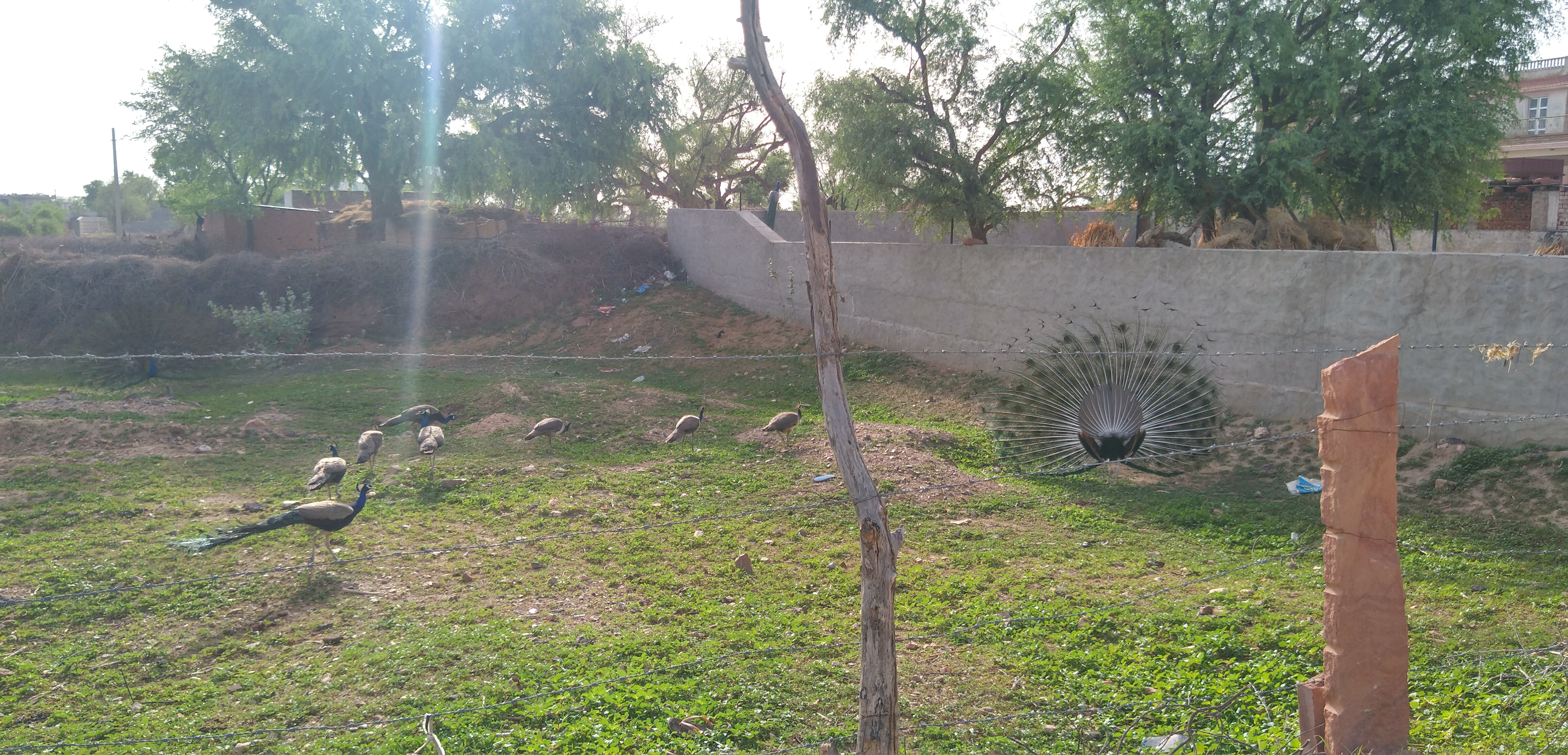
Peacocks

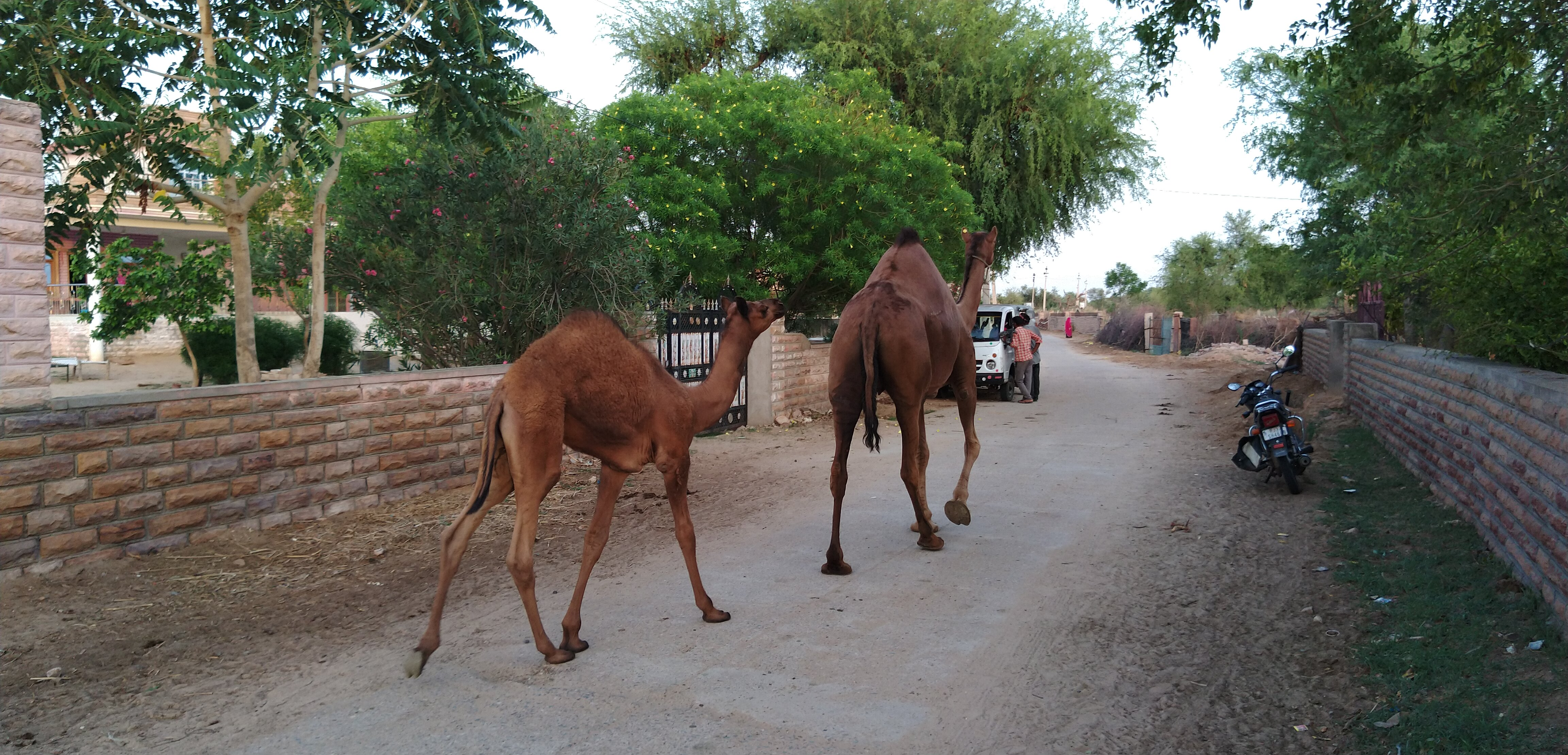
Camels
