= Dapu Khan =

Indian folk singer (died 2021)

- Born: Jaisalmer, Rajasthan, India
- Died: 13 March 2021
- Occupation: Folk Singer
- Known for: Playing Kamaicha (Instrument)
- Notable work: Mumal

Dapu Khan was a Rajasthani Folk singer known for entertaining tourists from India and abroad in the fort of Jaisalmer over 30 years. He died at the age of 62 on 13 March 2021, after reportedly suffering a heart attack. Dapu is one of the very few exponents of the Kamaicha, which is often termed as one of the oldest bowed instruments in the world.

== Life ==
Khan lived in Bhadli Village, 127 km from Jaisalmer City in Fatehgarh District.

== Death ==
Dapu Khan died on 13 March 2021, due to a heart attack.
