= Allah Jilai Bai =

Indian singer (1902–1992)

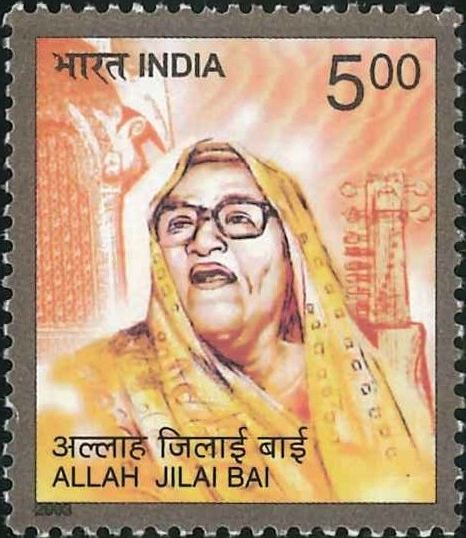
- Allah Jilai Bai on a 2003 Indian stamp

Background information
- Born: 1 February 1902; Jaisingh Desar Magra, Bikaner, Bikaner State, British India
- Died: 3 November 1992 (aged 90)
- Genres: Folk

Allah Jilai Bai (1 February 1902 – 3 November 1992) was a folk singer from Rajasthan, India.

== Early life ==
Born in Bikaner to a family of singers, by the age of 10 she was singing in the Durbar of Maharaja Ganga Singh. She took singing lessons from Ustad Hussain Baksh Khan and later on from Achhan Maharaj. At one time she sang in the court of Ganga Singh, the Maharajah of Bikaner.

She was well versed in Maand, Thumri, Khayal and Dadra.

== Awards and recognition ==
In 1982, the Indian Government awarded her the Padma Shri in Arts field, one of the highest civilian awards. She was also given the Sangeet Natak Akademi Award in 1988 for Folk Music, and was posthumously awarded the Rajasthan Ratna in 2012.

== Songs ==
Perhaps her best-known piece is "Kesariya Balam". Her most known songs include:

- "Kallali"
- "Kesariya Balam"
- "Bai Sara Beera"
- "Moomal"
- "Kurja"
- "Chhappar Purana"
- "Aaj to Naina Ro Lobhi"
- "Aayo Aayo Sanina Ro Sath"
- "Poojan Dyo Gangaur"

== See also ==
- Music of Rajasthan
