= Kshudhita Pashan =

1960 film by Tapan Sinha

- Directed by: Tapan Sinha
- Based on: Kshudhita Pashan (short story) by Rabindranath Tagore
- Screenplay by: Manmatha Roy
- Story by: Rabindranath Tagore
- Produced by: Hemen Ganguly
- Starring: Soumitra Chatterjee; Arundhati Devi; Chhabi Biswas; Radhamohan Bhattacharya; Dilip Roy
- Cinematography: Bimal Mukherjee
- Edited by: Subodh Roy
- Music by: Ali Akbar Khan
- Production company: Eastern Circuit Pvt. Ltd.
- Release date: 6 May 1960
- Running time: 102 minutes
- Country: India
- Language: Bengali

Kshudhita Pashan is a Bengali-language epic period horror film directed by Tapan Sinha. Produced by Hemen Ganguly, it is based on an eponymous 1895 short story of Rabindranath Tagore.(Eng: "The Hungry Stones"). This film was released in 1960 and received National Film Award for Second Best Feature Film. Music direction was done by Ustad Ali Akbar Khan.

== Plot ==
A young tax collector is posted to a small town. He starts to reside in an abandoned old palace which is rumoured to be haunted. Local people try to warn him that whoever has attempted to stay there has either gone mad or died because the stones of the building are hungry. He realizes that a mysterious beautiful lady roams around the building at night.

== Cast ==
- Soumitra Chatterjee
- Arundhati Devi
- Chhabi Biswas
- Radhamohan Bhattacharya as Karim Khan
- Dilip Roy
- Padma Devi
- Robin Banerjee
- Arun Mukherjee

== Awards ==
- 1960: National Film Award for Second Best Feature Film
- 1960: Best Film-Cork festival, Ireland
