= Paner =

- village
- Location in Rajasthan, India
- Coordinates: 26.846549°N 74.825842°E
- Country: India
- State: Rajasthan
- District: Ajmer

Government
  - Body: Gram panchayat

Population
  - Total: 1,398 (males−705 females−693) as per census 2,011

Languages
  - Official: Hindi
- Time zone: UTC+5:30 (IST)
- PIN: 305814
- ISO 3166 code: IN-RJ

Paner is a village in Ajmer district in Rajasthan. This village is associated with the folk-deity Tejaji, as it was his sasural.

== See also ==
- Tejaji
- Sursura
- Kharnal
