= Batool Begam =

Indian folk singer

Batool Begum
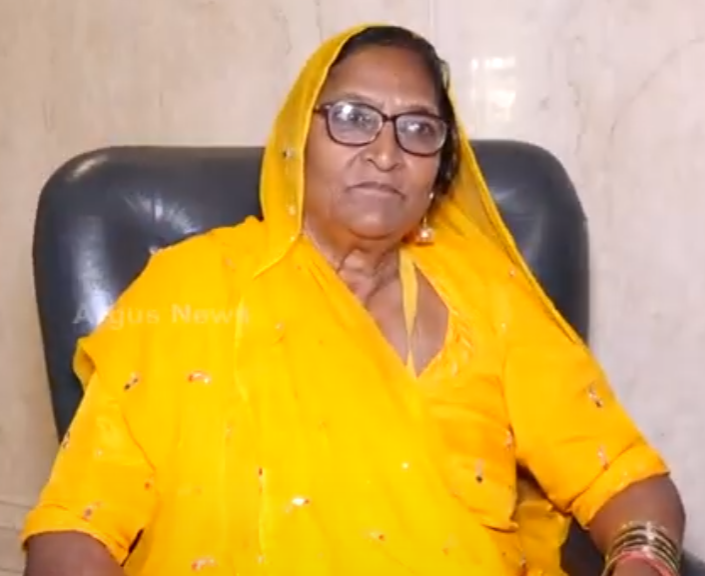
- In a 2022 interview
- Other names: Batool Begam
- Occupation: Folk singer
- Known for: Mand and bhajan singing
- Awards: Nari Shakti Puruskar (2021); Padma Shri (2025)

Batool Begum is a folk music singer from Jaipur in the Indian state of Rajasthan. She sings mand and bhajan songs and has become internationally famous. She plays instruments such as the dhol, dholak and tabla.

== Biography ==
Begum Batul was born in Kerap village in Didwana district of Rajasthan. She dropped out of school in the fifth grade. She belongs to the Mirasi community of Rajasthan. Her interest in singing mand is a family tradition. But Bhajans are not like that. At the age of eight, she used to go in front of Thakur Ji's temple in Kerap village of Nagaur every day with her friends, which is how she developed a passion for singing Bhajans. Later, she started singing Bhajans herself.

=== Personal life ===
Begum got married at the age of 16. She and her husband, Feroz Khan, who was a conductor on the roadways, have three sons. She currently lives with her family in Vidyadhar Nagar, Jaipur.

== Career ==
Begum, a singer of Maand and Bhajan style folk songs, also plays Indian musical instruments like the tabla, dholak, and dhol. Born into the Muslim faith and starting singing Hindu bhajans, Begum conveys a message of communal unity through her songs, she gives a message of communal harmony through her songs.

Apart from various stages in India Begum Batul has performed in 56 countries outside India, including France, Germany, Tunisia, Italy, Switzerland, the US, and the UK. She is member of the Bollywood Klezmer, an international fusion folk music band consisting of artists from different religions performing fusion music from different cultures.

She performed at the Olympics in France, with other folk artists of her group Basant. Begum is the only woman from Rajasthan to have performed at the Town Hall in Paris.

== Awards and honors ==
Batool Begam was awarded the 2021 Nari Shakti Puruskar on International Women's Day in 2022. In 2025 January, she received the Padma Shri. Begum has also been honoured by the governments of France and Tunisia. On International Women's Day 2021, she received the GOPIO Achievers Award - 2021 and the Certificate of Excellence Award.
