= Rasheed Kidwai =

Indian writer and political analyst (born 1967)

- Born: 20 July 1967 (age 59); Lucknow
- Occupation: Writer
- Spouse: Farah Kidwai
- Writing career
- Genre: biography/memoir
- Notable works: SONIA - A Biography, 24 Akbar Road, Neta Abhineta: Star Power in Indian Politics, Ballot - Ten Episodes That Have Shaped India's Democracy

Rasheed Kidwai (born 20 July 1967, in Lucknow) is an Indian journalist, author and political analyst. He is a visiting Fellow with the Observer Research Foundation.

Kidwai has appeared on News 18, Times Now, ABP news and NDTV.

Kidwai tracks Indian government, political parties, community affairs and Hindi cinema. He also reports on the Indian National Congress, Sonia Gandhi, Rahul Gandhi, and Priyanka Gandhi.

Kidwai is the author of Sonia, A Biography and 24 Akbar Road.

== Personal life ==
=== Education ===
Kidwai is a graduate from St Stephen’s College, Delhi [1989]. His school was Centennial School, Lucknow [1980], Anglo Arabic School, Delhi [1984] and Bhartiya Vidya Bhawan, New Delhi [1986].

Kidwai did his master's in mass communication research at University of Leicester where had gone on a fellowship given by British and Commonwealth Office, UK.

=== Family ===
Kidwai's family comes from Daryabad, Barabanki, Kidwai's maternal grandfather was Maulana Abdul Majid Daryabadi, a noted English and Urdu commentator of the Quran. Kidwai's wife Dr Farah Kidwai is Scientist 'G' DRDO, ministry of Defence, Government of India.

== Career ==
Formerly Associate Editor of The Telegraph, Calcutta, Kidwai is a regular political commentator on various television networks, radio programmes and newspapers. Kidwai is a columnist with The Tribune Chandigarh, Mumbai Mirror, ThePrint, ABP News Blog, Network 18, Inquilab, Dainik Jagran, Amar Ujala, Prabhat Khabar, Rediff, The Quint and a range of other English, Hindi and Urdu publications.

== Selected bibliography ==
- The House of Scindias -a saga of Power, Politics and Intrigue
- A Biography [Penguin India 2003]. The book has been translated into Hindi, Telugu, Marathi, Punjabi, Tamil and revised in 2009 and 2011.
- 24, Akbar Road, -- A Short History of The People Behind The Fall and Rise of The Congress [Hachette 2011] is considered as an important source of Congress history.
- Neta Abhineta: Star Power in Indian Politics, [Hachette India 2018] tracked political journey of Prithviraj Kapoor, Nargis, Sunil Dutt, Amitabh Bhachan, Jaya Bachchan, Rekha, Mithun Chakraborty, Dharmendra, Hema Malini, Govinda, Shatrughan Sinha, Rajesh Khanna, Vinod Khanna, Dev Anand, Dilip Kumar, Jaya Prada, Javed Akhtar, Shabana Azmi, Paresh Rawal and Raj Babbar.
- Ballot: Ten Episodes that Have Shaped India's Democracy [Hachette India 2018] tracing how elections are fought in the country. The anecdotal account has also focussed on many leading players of Indian politics such as N T Ramarao, Bal Thackeray, Mayawati and Mamata Banerjee.

=== Writings ===
- What's eating the congress
- The complex narratives of 'Ghazwa-e-Hind'
- COVID-19 and Indian Muslims
- Cow Slaughter
- Why we need a special law to curb mob lynching
- Sachin Pilot & Co will be 49th breakaway from Congress. But only 16 survived on their own
