= Mand (singing style) =

Mand or Maand (Hindi: मांड गायकी) (Rajasthani: मांड गाणौ) is a style of singing in Rajasthan, used in folk songs. It is similar to the thumri and the ghazal.

Well known Mand singers include Allah Jilai Bai from Bikaner (awarded Padma Shri-1982 and Sangeet Natak Akademi Award-1988 in Folk Music), Mangi Bai Arya from Udaipur (awarded Sangeet Natak Akademi Award-2008 in Folk Music), and Gavari Bai from Jodhpur (awarded by Sangeet Natak Akademi Award-1975-76 and 1986 in Folk Music), Begam Batool from Jaipur (awarded Nari Shakti Puraskar-2021 in Bhajan & folk music).

Mand is a combination of Classical and Cultural Singing. it is full of emotions and have a test of Rajasthani rural traditions, In ancient ara of Rajputs, mand was sung in various cultural and festival related programs organized by Maharajas.

== Film songs ==
Song	Movie	Composer	Singers
Ab To Hai Tumse Har Khushi Apni	Abhimaan (1973 film)	S. D. Burman	Lata Mangeshkar
Tu Chanda Main Chandani	Reshma Aur Shera	Jaidev	Lata Mangeshkar
Bachpan Ki Mohabbat Ko Dil Se Na Judaa Karna	Baiju Bawra (film)	Naushad	Lata Mangeshkar
Jo Me Jaanthi Bisarat	Shabaab (film)	Naushad	Lata Mangeshkar
Kesariya Balma	Lekin...	Hridaynath Mangeshkar	Lata Mangeshkar
Piya Piya Bole Mora Kangana	Swarg Narak	Rajesh Roshan	

Song	Movie	Composer	Singers
Nee Daana nannadiraa	Jayabheri	Pendyala (composer)	Ghantasala (musician)
