= List of villages in Ladnu tehsil =

Villages located in Ladnu Tehsil, Rajasthan State, India.

- Anesariya
- Asota
- Badela
- Bader
- Baldoo
- Balsamand
- Bakaliya
- Ber
- Bhamas
- Bharnawa
- Bhidasari
- Bhiyani
- Bithooda
- Chak Goredi
- Chandrai
- Chhapara
- Chundasar
- Dabri Jodha ratnot
- Datau
- Deora
- Dheengsari
- Dholiya
- Dhurila
- Dhyawa
- Dobron Ka Bas
- Dujar
- Genana
- Gheerdoda Khara
- Gheerdoda Meetha
- Girdharipura
- Godaron Ka Bas
- Goredi
- Gunpaliya
- Hirawati
- Hudas
- Husenpura
- Indrapura
- Jaswant Garh
- Jeslan
- Jhardiya
- Jhekariya
- Kasan
- Kasumbi Alipur
- Kasumbi Jakhlan
- Kasumbi Naliya
- Kasumbi Upadara
- Khamiyad
- Khangar
- Khanpur
- Khindas
- Khokhari
- Koyal
- Kumasiya
- Kushalpura
- Kusumbi Alipur
- Kusumbi Upadra
- Kusumbi Jakhala
- Kusumbi Naliya
- Lachhri
- Ladnu
- Ledi
- Lodsar
- Lukas
- Malasi
- Malgaon
- Mangalpura
- Manu
- Manu Ki Dhani
- Meendasari
- Meethari Marwar
- Nandwan
- Natas
- Nimbi Jodhan
- Odint
- Padampura
- Peepakuri
- Phirwasi
- Raidhana
- Rampura
- Ratau
- Ratheel
- Reengan
- Rewaron Ka Bas
- Ridmalas
- Rodu
- Roja
- Sandas
- Sanwrad
- Sardi
- Seenwa
- Shimla
- Shyampura
- Sikrali
- Silanwad
- Sunari
- Tanwara
- Tiloti
- Tipani
- Titri
- Toki
- Tilokpura
- Udrasar
- Vishwanathpura
