= List of villages in Nawa tehsil =

Villages located in Nawa Tehsil, Rajasthan State, India.

- Abas
- Abhaypura
- Adaksar
- Ajeetpura
- Anandpura (Anatpura)
- Asanpura
- Aspura
- Bajna
- Bangarh
- Banwali
- Baori
- Baralpura
- Barjan
- Batliya
- Begpura
- Bhagwanpura
- Bhairupura
- Bhanwarpura
- Bhanwata
- Bhatipura
- Bhawanipura
- Bheenchron Ka Bas
- Bheevpura
- Bhilal
- Bhooni
- Bijapura
- Budhdeopura
- Butinathpura
- Chak Daron Ka Bas
- Chandpura city
- Charanwas
- Chawandiya
- Chhapri
- Chitawa
- Chosla
- Dabsi
- Danpura
- Daron Ka Bas
- Daulatpura
- Dediya Ka Bas
- Deeppura
- Deola
- Devli Kalan
- Deonagar
- Daipur
- Deusar
- Dhuto Ki Dhani
- Gandhi Gram
- Gauravpura
- Gawariya
- Gharwani
- Ghatwa
- Gogor
- Gopal Pura
- Govindi
- Gugarwar
- Gurha Rajawata
- Gurha Salt
- Hanumanpura
- Haripura
- Haritpura
- Hariya Joon
- Hirani
- Hudeel
- Indali (Nirmal Gram Panchayat)
- Indokha
- Jabdi Nagar
- Jasrana
- Jaswantpura
- Jawanpura
- Jeejot
- Jeenwar
- Jiliya
- Joshipura
- Kakot
- Kaliyawas
- Kaloli
- Kanchanpura
- Kankariya
- Kanpura
- Kansera
- Kantiya
- Karkeri
- Kasari
- Keriyawas
- Kerpura
- Khakharki
- Khardapura
- Khardiya
- Khariya
- Khoranda
- Khorandi
- Khushiya
- Kokpura
- Kooni
- Kotra
- Kuchaman City
- Kukanwali
- Lakhanpura
- Lakhji Ka Bas
- Lalas
- Lamba
- Lichana
- Lohrana
- Loonwa
- Lora Ka Bas
- Lorpura
- Maharajpura
- Mandawara
- Mangalpura
- Manglodi
- Manji Ki Dhani
- Manpura
- Maroth (see Panch Mahal Maroth)
- Matasukha
- Meethri
- Minda
- Mohanpura
- Moondgasoi
- Moonpura
- Moti Ram Ki Dhani
- Motipura
- Muwana
- Nagwara
- Nalot
- Nanana
- Narayanpura
- Narsinghpura
- Nawa
- Naya Bas
- Nehru Nagar
- Nolasiya
- Nonpura
- Ompura
- Palara
- Palri
- Panchota
- Panchwa
- Panwari
- Parewadi
- Piprali
- Prempura
- Purohiton Ka Bas
- Rajas
- Rajliya
- Rajpura
- Ramnagar
- Rampura
- Ram pura
- Ranasar
- Ranwa
- Rasal
- Rewasa Dalelpura
- Riksa
- Rooppura
- Rughnathpura
- Sabalpura
- Samoton Ka Bas
- Sanwatgarh
- Saranpura
- Sardarpura
- Sargoth Padampura
- Sawaipura
- Shekhawatpura
- Sherpura
- Sheshma Ka Bas
- Shimbhoopura
- Shiv
- Shivdanpura
- Shivpurvi
- Shrawanpura
- Shri Nagar
- Shyamgarh
- Sidiyas
- Sindhupura
- Sirsi
- Solaya
- Sujanpura
- Suratpura
- Takiya
- Thathana
- Thikariya Kalan
- Thikariya Khurd
- Tirsingiya
- Todas
- Torda
- Udaipura
- Ugarpura
- Ukhamasar
- Ulana
- Vijay Nagar
