= Pabolav =

Coordinates: 27°39′13.65″N 74°27′37.43″E

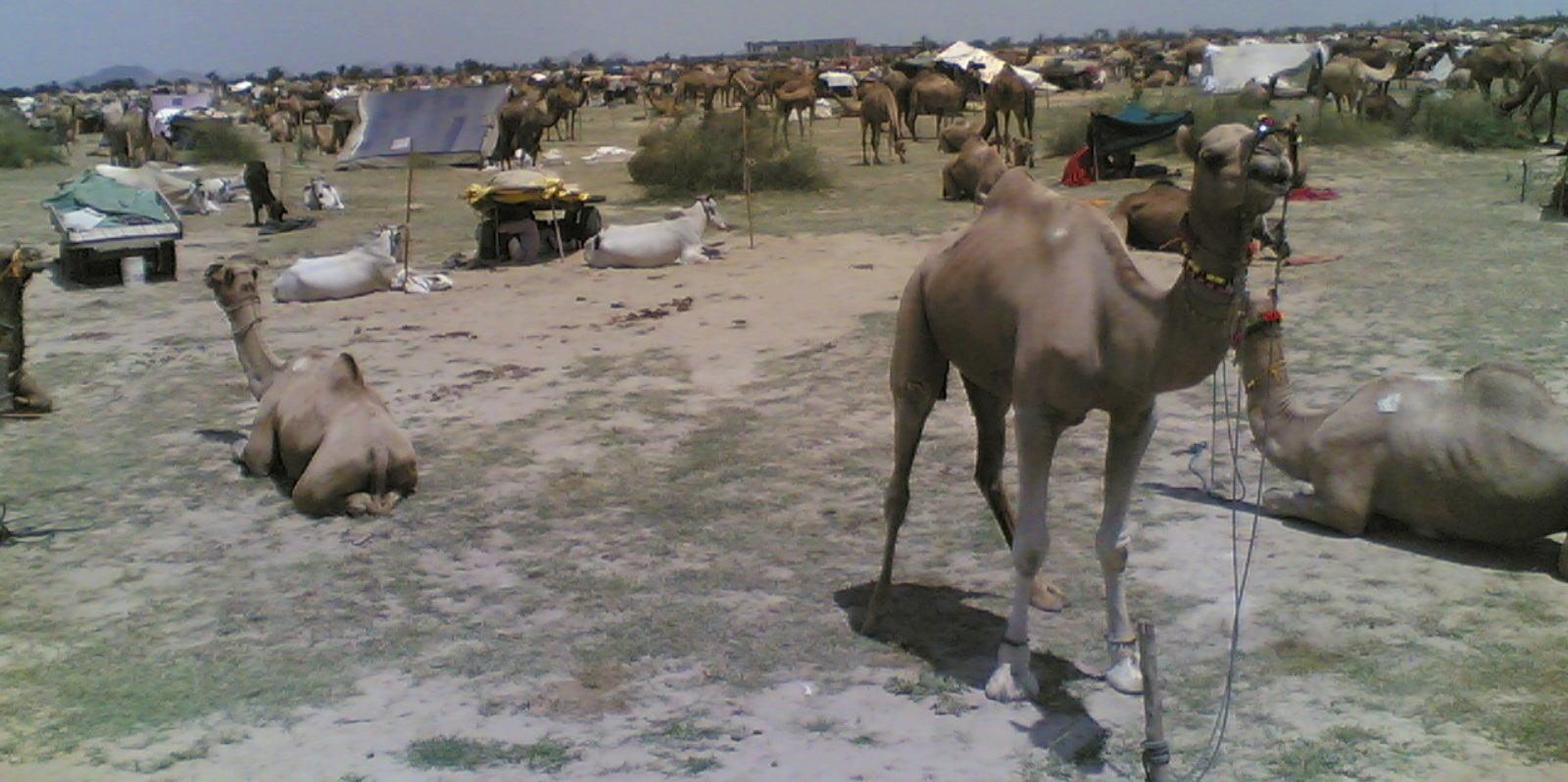
Hanuman Cattle Fair of Sujalanchal

Pabolav is a village in Nagaur district in the Indian state of Rajasthan, located between three cities, Sujangarh, Jaswantgarh and Ladnun. The combination is called Sujala.

== Temples ==
Its main shrine is Lord Hanuman's temple beside a pond. This is called a holy Shree Sidha Pith. It is near the birthplace of Salasar Balaji (Asota). Shree Kamleshwar bharati is Present peethadheswar of Pabolav dham.

== Cattle fair ==
Every year a cattle fair runs for 10 days. It occurs in the Bhadra month of lunar calendar (August–September). The fairground is on National Highway No. 6 5 Jaswantgarh - Ladnun, Surajmal Tapdiyha ITI is located near the fairground. The fair operates under the auspices of the Panchayat Samiti Ladnun. Fair merchants come from Uttar Pradesh, Punjab, Haryana, Madhya Pradesh and Rajasthan, comprising thousands of cattle merchants.

Cattle breeds include Marwari breed, Nagauri and Shekhawati bull, bull-buffalo. Camel breeds include Bikaneri, Jaisalmeri and Tordiyia. Horses are also traded.

Events include camel racing, horse racing, bull calf racing and utni racing. Kalbelia dance and Teja gayan provide entertainment.
