= Dayalpura =

- Village
- Location within Rajasthan
- Coordinates: 27°28′58″N 74°44′03″E
- Country: India
- State: Rajasthan
- District: Didwana Kuchaman District
- Gram Panchayat: Dayalpura

Government
  - Type: Gram Panchayat

Area
  - Land: 1,450.36 ha (3,583.9 acres)

Population
  - Total: 3,363
- Time zone: UTC+5:30 (IST)
- PIN: 341303
- Telephone code: 01580
- Website: https://didwana-kuchaman.rajasthan.gov.in/home/dptHome/1277

Dayalpura is a village in the Didwana Tehsil of Didwana-Kuchaman, Rajasthan, India. It falls under the Didwana development block and is 18 km away from the Didwana which is the nearest town to Dayalpura. The village is administrated by a sarpanch, who is an elected representative of the village. Dayalpura is the seat of local village panchayat government.

== Demographics ==
According to the 2011 census, the population of village Dayalpura was 3,363, of which 1,755 are males and 1,608 are females.

- Dayalpura has 500 children, 259 boys and 241 girls.
- Scheduled caste counts for 1069 (31.79%) males constitute 562 (16.71%) of the population and females 507 (15.08%).
- Scheduled tribe counts for 23 (0.68%) males constitute 11 (0.33%) of the population and females 12 (0.36%).
- Population density of Dayalpura is 230.6 persons per square kilometer.

== Education ==
As per the census 2011 report, 2033 people are literate in Dayalpura out of which 1269 are males and 764 are females. Dayalpura has the following educational facilities:

- 1 Government Senior secondary school {Co-Ed}
- 1 Government Primary school {Co-Ed}
- 1 Upper primary school {For Girls}
- 2 Private Schools, one secondary and senior secondary

For higher education, students depend on nearby cities such as Didwana, Shahpura, Sikar, etc.

== Medical facilities ==
Dayalpura has one Primary Healthcare Center and one Ayurvedic Health Center. For the treatment of severe disease, residents rely on hospitals in larger cities as there are no specialist doctors or advanced medical facilities available in the village.

== Economy ==
According to a census 2011 report, 1503 people of the total population are employed. Out of that, 902 are male, and 601 are female, with 35.73% (537) of all workers being employed full-time.

Residents of Dayalpura also migrate to nearby cities for seasonal employment.
