= Meethari Marwar =

- Village
- Meethari Marwar in Rajasthan Meethari Marwar (India)
- Coordinates (Meethari Marwar): 27.575975°N 74.687235°E
- Country: India
- State: Rajasthan
- District: Didwana-Kuchaman district
- Tehsil: Ladnun
- Settled: 900 years ago
- Founder: Unknown

Government
  - Type: Panchayat
  - Sarpanch: Laxmi Devi Bazari

Area
  - Total: 1,035 ha (2,560 acres)
  - Rural: 1,035 ha (2,560 acres)

Dimensions
  - Length: 3 km (1.9 mi)
  - Width: 1 km (0.62 mi)

Population (census of India 2011)
  - Total: 3,906
  - Density: 377.4/km^{2} (977.4/sq mi)
- Time zone: UTC+5:30 (IST)
- PIN: 341303
- Telephone code: +91 1581
- ISO 3166 code: RJ-IN
- Website: meetharimarwar.blogspot.in

Meethari Marwar is a village in Ladnun tehsil of Didwana-Kuchaman district in the Indian state of Rajasthan.

== History ==
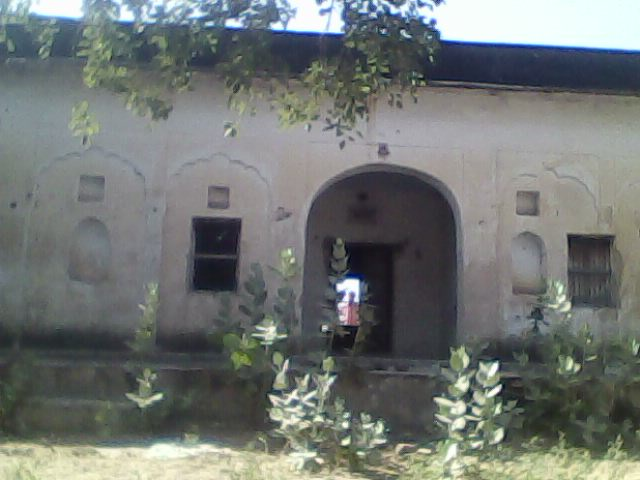
Shree Darbar Lower Hindi Primary School was established by Jodhpur State in 1929. At present this building hosts the Shree Jeevan Boys Hostel.

The date of establishment, and information about founders of the village, are unclear. However, some evidence and historical accounts indicate that this area was settled about 1100–1150 AD, during the Rajput princely era. According to local evidence, there was a pond on the site long before the village was founded. The pond is known as Piparni Nadi or Pipaly Nadi and is regularly replenished with rainwater; so, it became a resting point on the route that was used between two principalities, Shekhawati and Marwar. Evidence shows that when traders, the army, banjaras, or others travelling along this way, they rested and took shelter here, because they always found sweet and clean drinking water for themselves and their animals. So, it was soon called Meethari. Because this was also the entrance to Marwar state, people started to call it Meethari Marwar.

== Geography ==
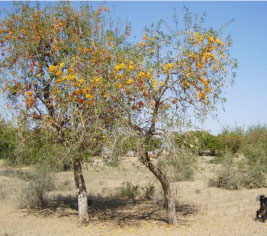
Rohida Flower : (Tecomella Undulata) In 1981 it was declared the state flower of Rajasthan.

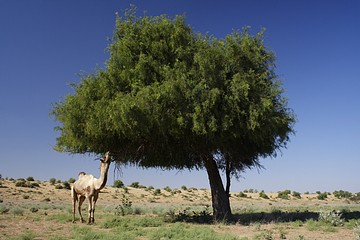
Khejari (Prosopis cineraria) State Tree of Rajasthan.

Meethari Marwar village is in Ladnun tehsil of Nagaur district in Rajasthan state. It is 124 kilometres (77 mi) northeast of Nagaur on the Salasar–Didwana section of Rajasthan State Highway 60.

The village experiences Thar Desert regional climate.

The main plants and trees are Acacia senegal and Acacia leucophloea, the Khejari Prosopis cineraria, Kankera, Rohida (the state flower of Rajasthan), Kair, Khair, etc., with some big trees such as Peepal, Bargad, Neem, Sheesam, Saresh. Despite large-scale forest clearances, a few mammals, such as foxes and jackals, still remain. The forested part of the village is home to other wild animals, such as big cats, mice, geckos, monitor lizards, and other reptiles, such as the king cobra, viper, and chameleon.

== Demographics ==
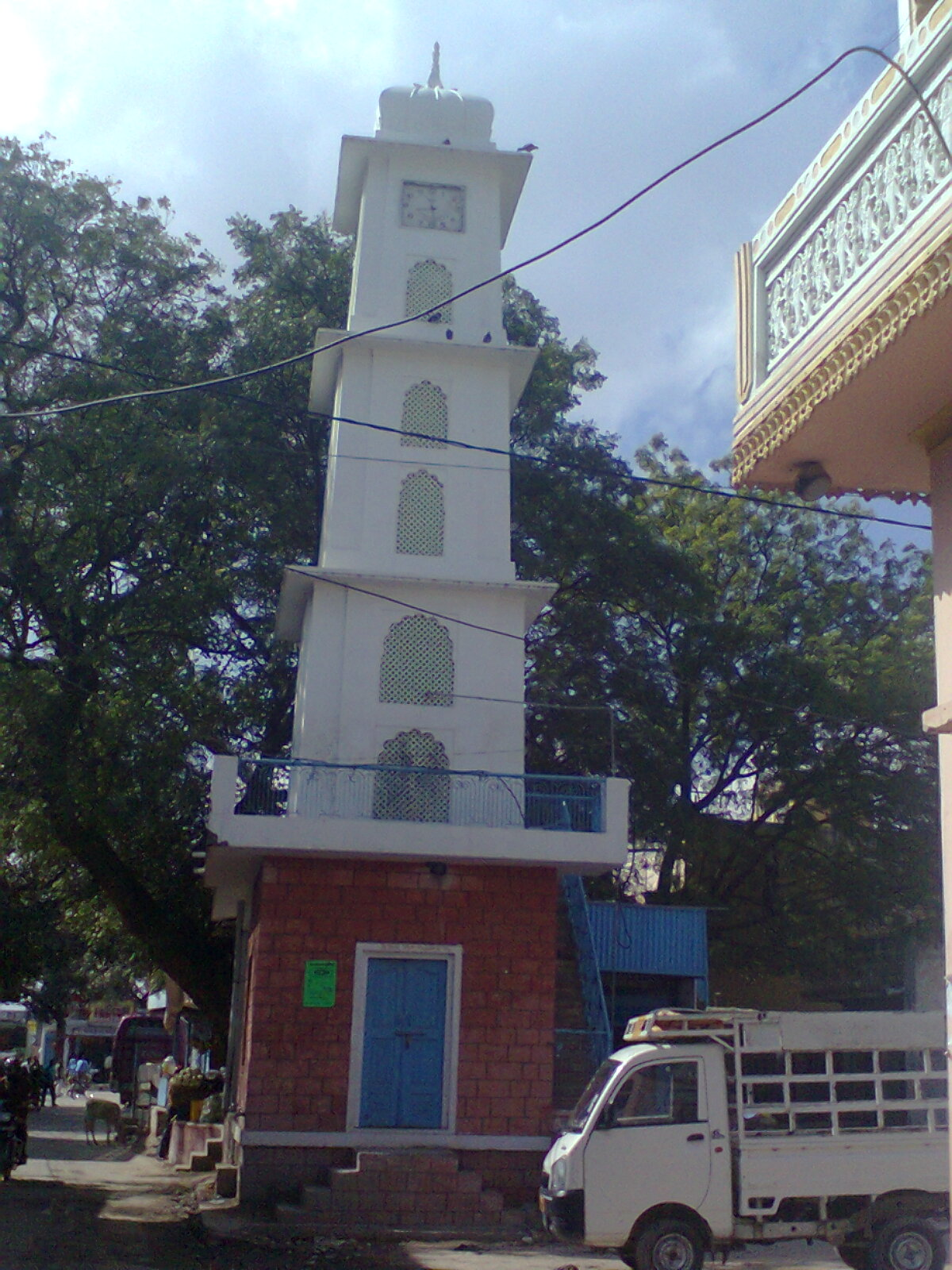
Clock Tower, Meethari Marwar

According to the 2001 Indian census, the population of Meethari Marwar village is as follows:

1. Total Population – 3236 Persons
2. Total Male Population – 1623 Male
3. Total Female Population – 1613 Female
4. Scheduled castes population – Persons 1,095
5. Scheduled castes population – Male
6. Scheduled castes population – Females 544
7. Scheduled tribes population – Persons 55
8. Scheduled tribes population – Males 28
9. Scheduled tribes population – Females 27

Meethari Marwar is a representative village of the traditional Rajasthani social and cultural rural environment.

There are mainly two communities—Hindu and Muslim—who live together in communal harmony. Hindu castes such as Agarwal, Brahmins, Jats, Rajput, Meghwal, Goldsmith, Suthar, potters, and Meena live here. There are some Muslim clans in the village, such as the Qaimkhani, Chhinpa, and Maniyars.

Almost all Hindu families worship the regional folk gods and goddesses, which is the usual practice in village life in Rajasthan. Gogaji, the god of snakes, is the most recognized folk god. Traditional Rajasthani villages have Gogaji dwelling worship palaces that are generally referred to as Goga Meri. Tejaji, Pabuji, Durga mother, Rajalbai, Shyam Ji, Thakur ji, Balaji, Shiv Darbar, Bhomiaji, and Bharavji are also some of the local deities are worshiped in the village.

== Economy ==
Almost 60 percent of the village's population depends on agriculture for their livelihood. The total land area is 1,055 hectares (2,610 acres) of which 1,035 hectares (2,560 acres) (98 percent) are farmed. All fields are small holdings and farming is entirely dependent on monsoon rains.

Many villagers have served and are currently serving in various branches of the Indian army, air force, and navy; in rural, state, and federal civil government; as well as there being teachers, bankers, etc.

The Agarwal caste is representative of the merchants in the village and were the highest caste; but they are slowly moving to other areas of the country, such as Mumbai, Surat, Silwasa, Asam, Bengal, Nagaland, and Hyedrabad. The Qaimkhani clan have served in various branches of the Indian army.

Some castes, such as goldsmiths, Suthar, potters, etc., still work in their traditional roles; but they very small in number.

== Government and politics ==
The village is a Gram Panchayat under Panchayat Samitee Ladnu. The Gram Panchayat is divided into 12 wards. Every five years the entire panchayat sarpanch is up for election, along with the heads, or panchon, of the 12 wards. In the 2020 panchayat election, Laxmi Devi Bajari was elected the village sarpanch.

== Public facilities ==
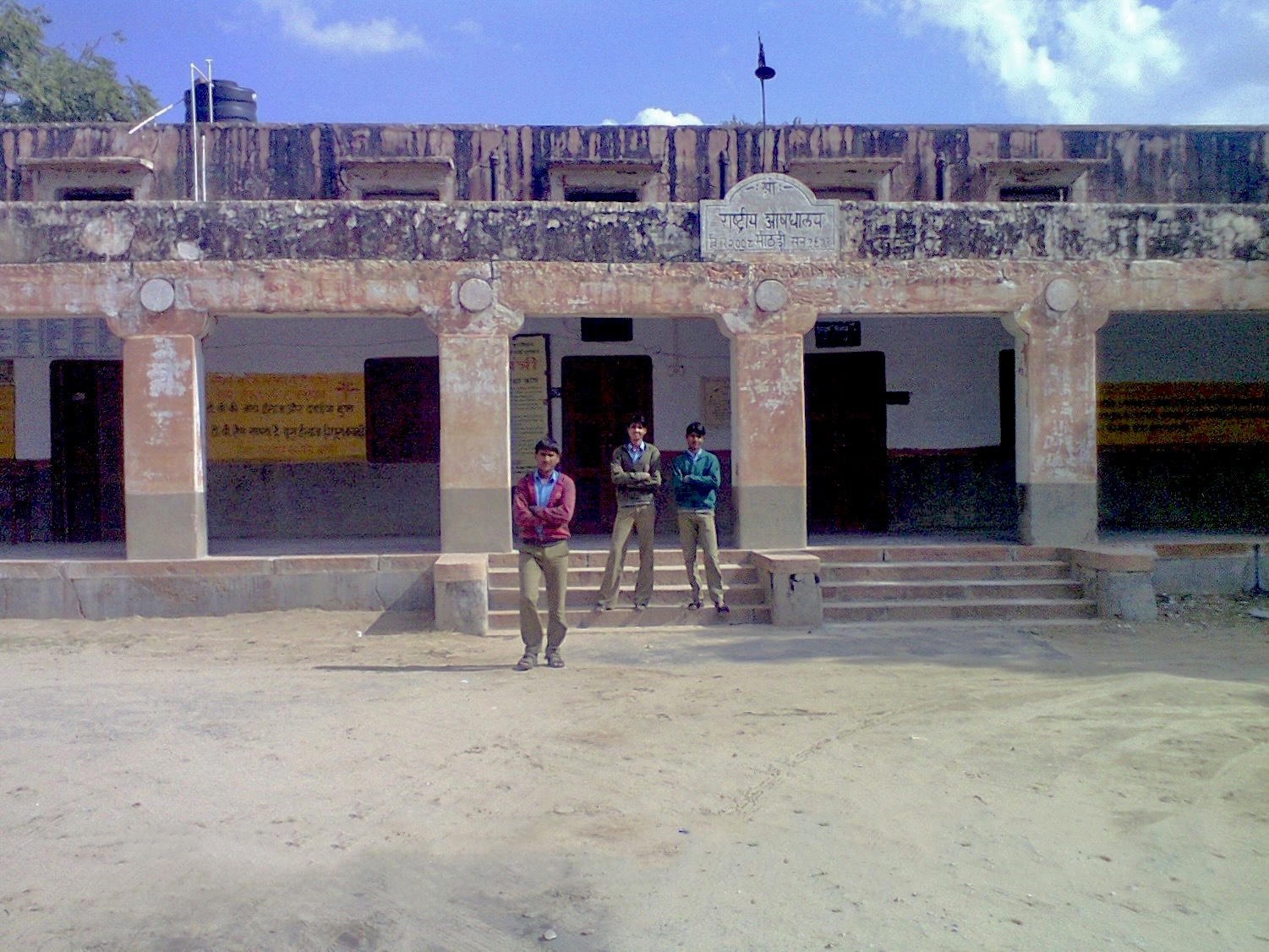
Government Community Health Centre, Meethari Marwar

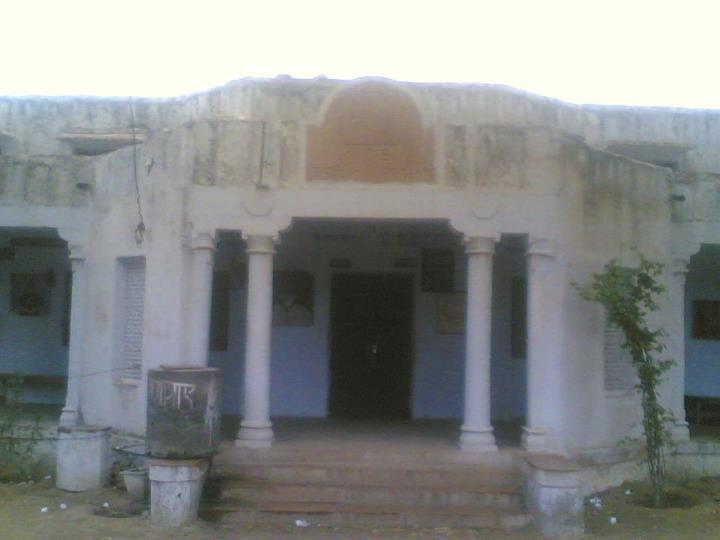
Government Senior Secondary School Meethari Marwar

The village has many public facilities.

Educational institutions:

- Rural Public Senior Secondary School
- Government Senior Secondary School
- Government Girls Secondary School (upgraded in August 2013)
- Government Upper Primary School
- Government Primary School No. 1
- Government Primary School No. 2 (Indira colony)
- Madarsa Islamiyan (K.K. Colony)
- Prince School (Lachhari Road, Rajput Colony)

Hospitals and clinics:

- Government Community Health Center
- Government Veterinary Hospital

Community halls and cultural centers:

- Jat Society Hall
- Parshuram Bhawan
- Bharech Bhawan
- Meghwal Dharma Shala
- Community Hall (Didwana Road)
- Bharat Nirman Rajiv Gandhi Sewa Kendra (Didwana Road)
- Shree Balaji Gau Seva Samiti Trust

Water distribution and management:

The level of underground water is very deep, 300 to 350 feet. Due to its increased salinity, it is unsuitable for agricultural or human consumption. Water is supplied from nearby Nechhwa town, via a tubewells system, as well as rain water harvesting for drinking water.

Integrated Watershed Management Programme (IWMP):

Since financial year 2011–15, the village's total arable land (1035 ha) has been placed under the Integrated Watershed Management Programme (IWMP), which is the erstwhile Drought Prone Areas Programme (DPAP) modified. The village is also a part of the Desert Development Programme (DDP) and Integrated Wastelands Development Programme (IWDP) of the Department of Land Resources.
