= Ladnu =

Ladnun Chanderi Nagari
- City
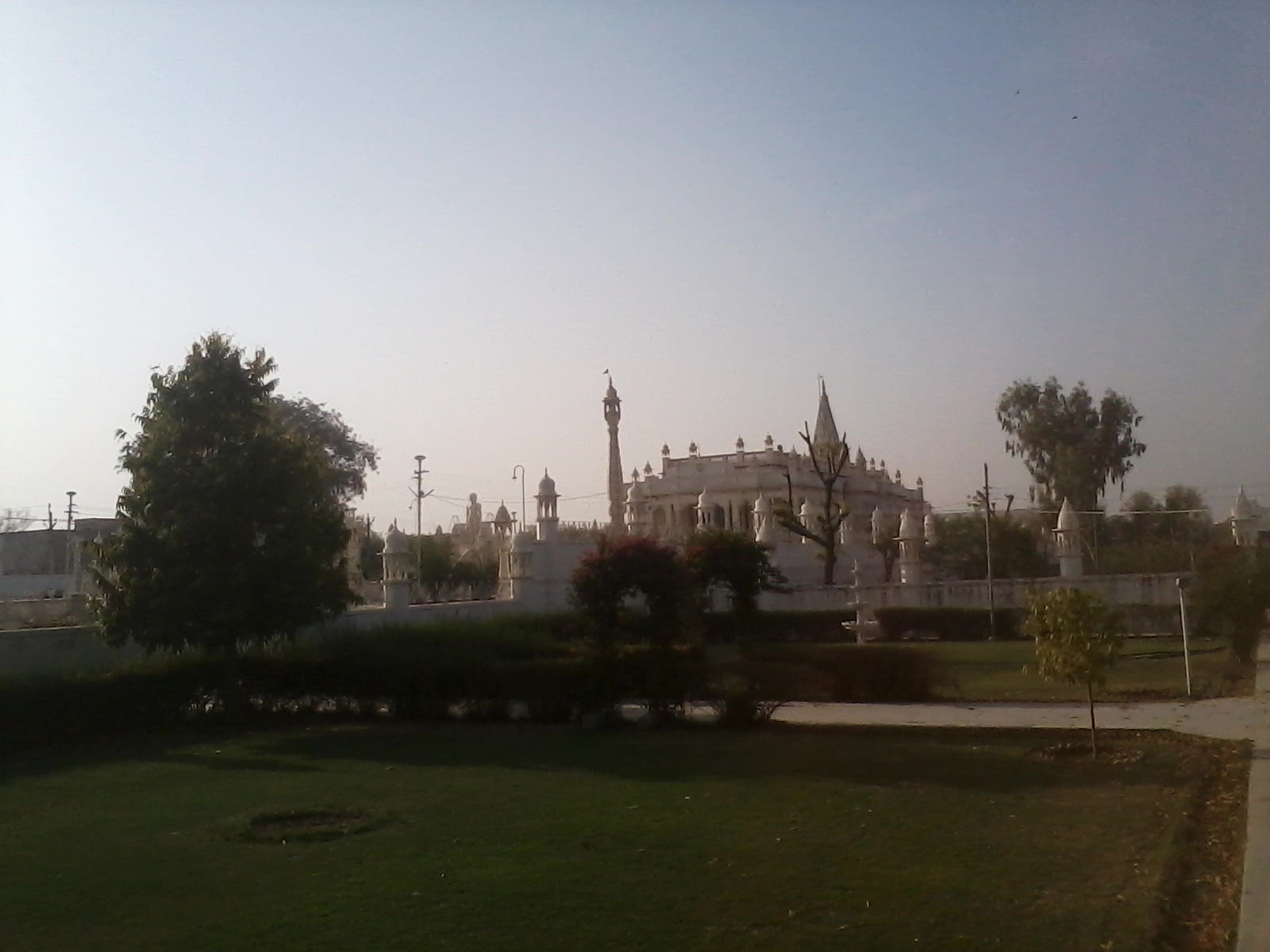
- Adinath Digambara Jain Temple, Ladnun, Nagaur (RJ)
- Nickname: Chanderi Nagari
- Location in Rajasthan, India
- Coordinates: 27.6500°N 74.3833°E
- Country: India
- State: Rajasthan
- District: Didwana Kuchaman
- Elevation: 328 m (1,076 ft)

Population (2011)
  - Total: 90,575

Languages
  - Official: Hindi, Rajasthani
- Time zone: UTC+5:30 (IST)
- PIN: 341306
- Telephone code: 01581
- Vehicle registration: RJ-37

Ladnu, also Ladnun, is a city and a municipality, in Didwana-Kuchaman district, (previously Nagaur District), in the Indian state of Rajasthan. It is a Tehsil headquarters of Didwana Kuchaman District. It is home to the Jain Vishva Bharati University.

== Introduction ==
Ladnun is a town and a municipality in Didwana district in the Indian state of Rajasthan. It is also the tehsil's headquarters and subdivision. Ladnun tehsil has [139 village] in all. Bakliya, Nimbi Jodha, Jaswantgarh and Sunari are the largest of the villages. Ladnun has a M.L.A seat and 45 elected ward members in Ladnun Municipality.

Ladnun was earlier known as Chanderi Nagari, It is 380 km west of Delhi and 225 km north-west of Jaipur. Its population is approx. 57,047 as of 2001 Indian census. It is situated 329 m above sea level and at 27° 39' 0" north and 74° 23'-1" east longitude.

== Jain Temple ==
The Digambara Bara Jain Temple has an inscription dating to 1229.

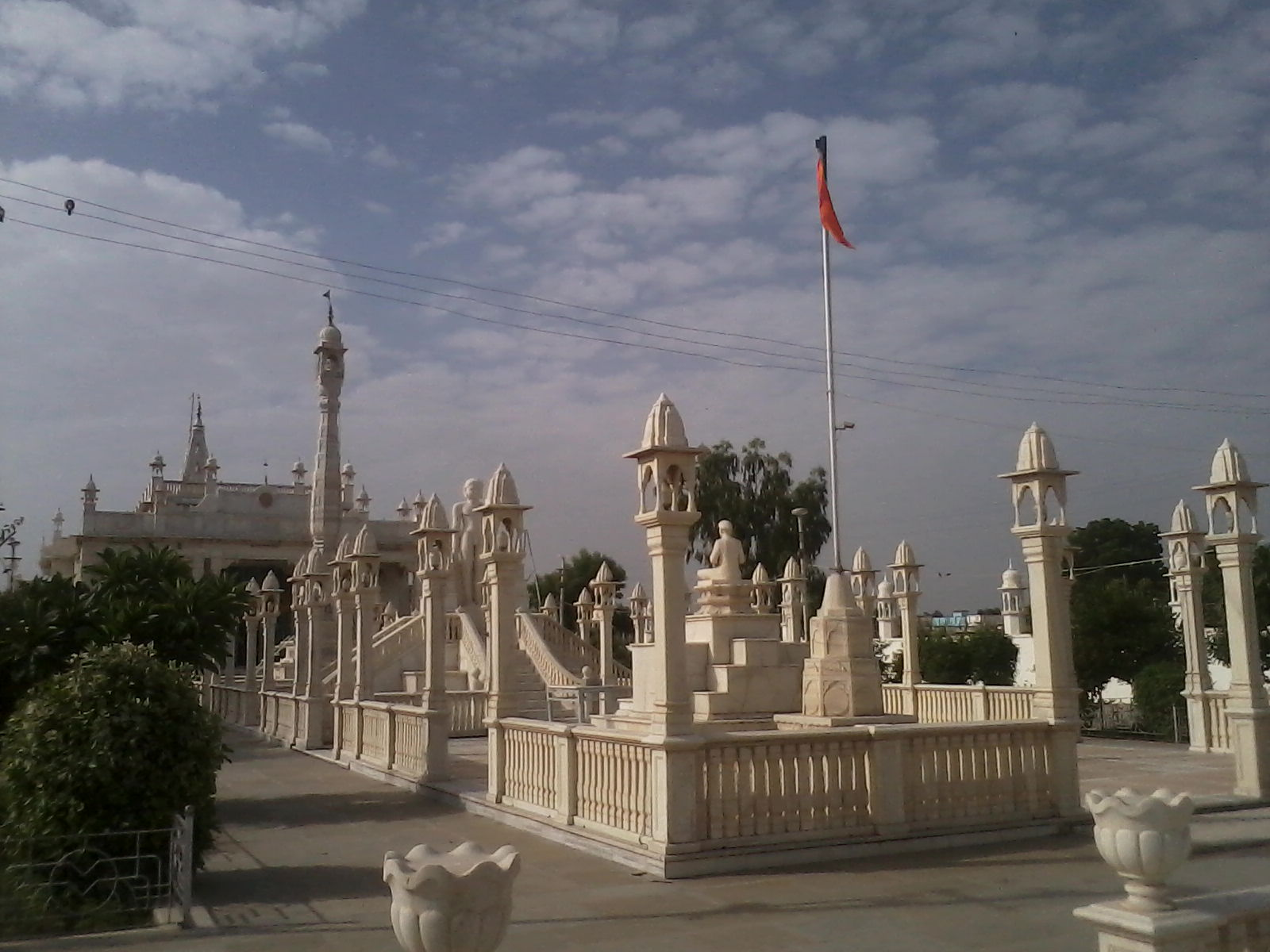
Marble work at the Jain temples

== Climate and rainfall ==
Ladnun has a dry climate with a hot summer. Sand storms are common in summer. The climate of the city is conspicuous by extreme dryness, large variations of temperature and highly variable rainfall. The mercury in the Mercury Barometer keeps on rising intensely from March till June. These are the hottest months. The maximum temperature recorded in the city is 47 °C with 0 °C as the lowest recorded temperature. The average temperature of the city is 23.5 °C. The winter season extends from mid November till the beginning of March. Rainy season is of a short duration from July to mid September. The average rainfall in the city is 36.16 cm & 51.5% humidity.

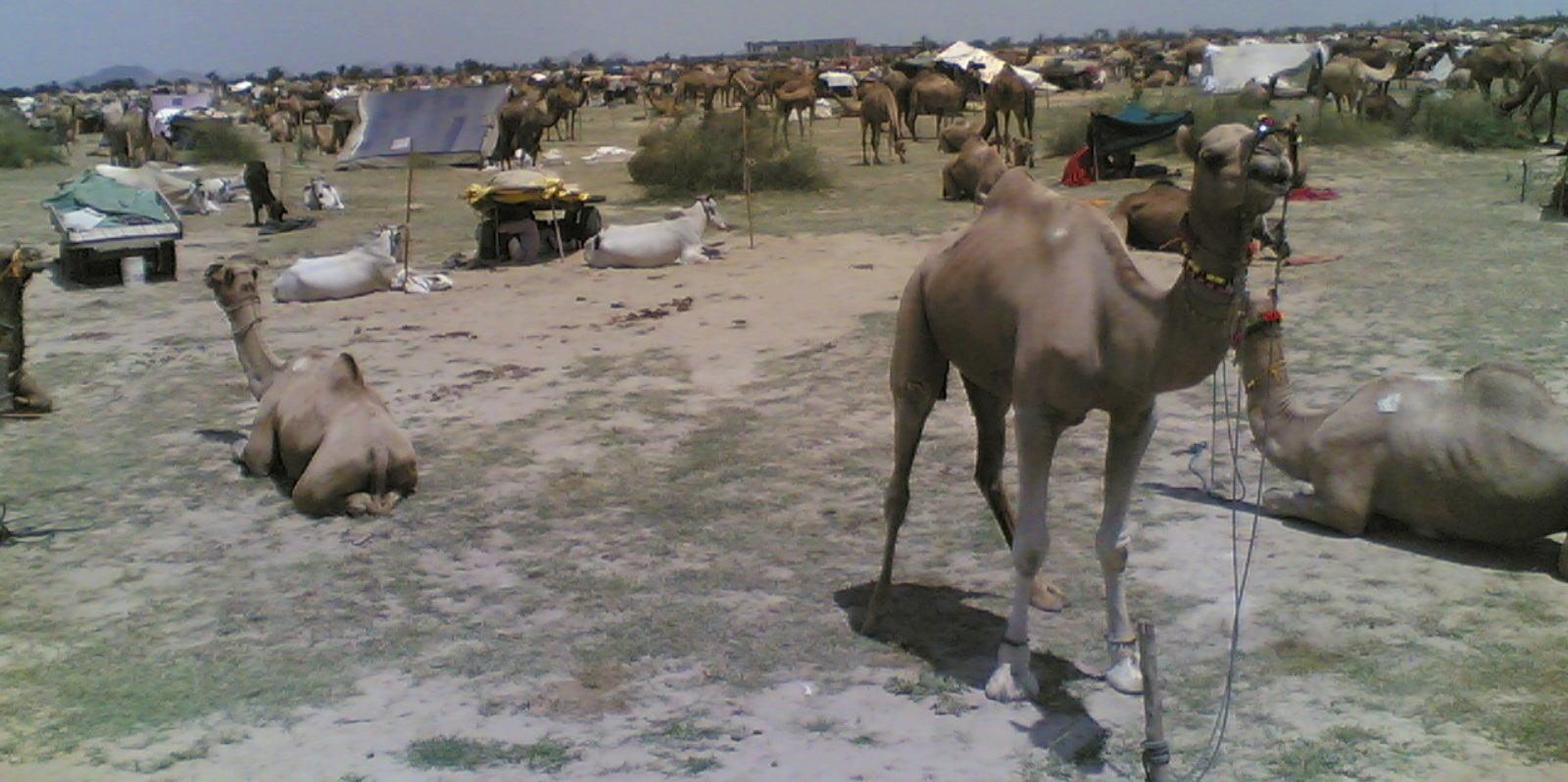
Pabolav cattle Fair

== History ==
History of Ladnun, Rajasthan Ladnun, historically known as Chanderi Nagari, is a town in Rajasthan's Didwana-Kuchaman district. Its history is deeply intertwined with the Rathore and Bhati Rajput clans, reflecting a legacy of power struggles, migrations, and alliances.

== Rathore Rule ==
In the 16th century, Rao Maldeo Rathore of Jodhpur annexed Ladnun, bringing it under the Rathore domain. The town remained a part of Jodhpur State until the mid-20th century. Under Rathore rule, Ladnun developed into an administrative and trade center, benefiting from its strategic location on the Marwar trade route.

== Bhati Clan's Arrival ==
The arrival of Thakur Udai Singh Bhati in Ladnun is a significant event recorded in the historic Pothi (manuscript) maintained by Bhat Rao Uday Singh of Asalpur. Originally from Bhawanda, Thakur Udai Singh Bhati was forced to leave due to the anger of the former Maharaja of Jodhpur. His original plan was to cross Marwar via Ladnun and settle in Churu, which at the time was beyond Jodhpur's direct control.

However, Thakur Padam Singh Rathore, the ruler of Ladnun, recognized the strategic value of Udai Singh's presence. He knew that Thakur Udai Singh was a skilled warrior, and if he settled in Churu, he could become a valuable asset to the ruler of Churu. Instead of letting this opportunity slip away, Thakur Padam Singh invited Udai Singh to settle in Ladnun, ensuring that Ladnun itself benefited from his military expertise and leadership.

This decision not only strengthened Ladnun's defensive and strategic position but also integrated the Bhati lineage into the region, shaping its future alliances and military strength.

== Modern Political Influence of the Rathore Clan ==
The Rathore clan continues to hold a strong reputation in Ladnun. The family has maintained its political influence, with Thakur Manohar Singh previously serving as the MLA of Ladnun. Today, his son, Thakur Karni Singh, carries forward his legacy and is regarded as the "Son of Ladnun", being one of the most popular and respected MLAs in the region.

== Demographics ==
As of 2001 India census, Ladnu had a population of 57,047. Males constitute 51% of the population and females 49%. Ladnu has an average literacy rate of 60%, higher than the national average of 59.5%: male literacy is 71%, and female literacy is 49%. In Ladnu, 17% of the population is under 6 years of age.

Villages located in Ladnu Tehsil, Rajasthan State, India.

- Anesariya
- Asota
- Badela
- Bader
- Baldoo
- Balsamand
- Bakaliya
- Ber
- Bhamas
- Bharnawa
- Bhidasari
- Bhiyani
- Bithooda
- Chak Goredi
- Chandrai
- Chhapara
- Chundasar
- Dabri Jodha ratnot
- Datau
- Deora
- Dheengsari
- Dholiya
- Dhurila
- Dhyawa
- Dobron Ka Bas
- Dujar
- Genana
- Gheerdoda Khara
- Gheerdoda Meetha
- Girdharipura
- Godaron Ka Bas
- Goredi
- Gunpaliya
- Hirawati
- Hudas
- Husenpura
- Indrapura
- Jaswant Garh
- Jeslan
- Jhardiya
- Jhekariya
- Kasan
- Kasumbi Alipur
- Kasumbi Jakhlan
- Kasumbi Naliya
- Kasumbi Upadara
- Khamiyad
- Khangar
- Khanpur
- Khindas
- Khokhari
- Koyal
- Kumasiya
- Kushalpura
- Kusumbi Alipur
- Kusumbi Upadra
- Kusumbi Jakhala
- Kusumbi Naliya
- Lachhri
- Ladnu
- Ledi
- Lodsar
- Lukas
- Malasi
- Malgaon
- Mangalpura
- Manu
- Manu Ki Dhani
- Meendasari
- Meethari Marwar
- Nandwan
- Natas
- Nimbi Jodhan
- Odint
- Padampura
- Peepakuri
- Phirwasi
- Raidhana
- Rampura
- Ratau
- Ratheel
- Reengan
- Rewaron Ka Bas
- Ridmalas
- Rodu
- Roja
- Sandas
- Sanwrad
- Sardi
- Seenwa
- Shimla
- Shyampura
- Sikrali
- Silanwad
- Sunari
- Tanwara
- Tiloti
- Tipani
- Titri
- Toki
- Tilokpura
- Udrasar
- Vishwanathpura
