= Rodoo, Nagaur =

Rodoo
- Village
- Location in Rajasthan, India Rodoo (India)
- Coordinates: 27.6050°N 74.5893°E
- Country: India
- State: Rajasthan
- District: Didwana Kuchaman

Population (2001)
  - Total: 5,613

Languages
  - Official: Hindi
- Time zone: UTC+5:30 (IST)
- PIN: 341304
- Telephone code: 01581
- Vehicle registration: RJ-37
- Sex ratio: 1000/972 ♂/♀

Rodu is a village in Ladnu tehsil of Didwana Kuchaman district in the Indian state of Rajasthan.

== Location ==
Rodu is situated at a distance of 22 km from Ladnu in the east direction.and 160 km from Jaipur

== Occupation ==
Main occupation of people is agriculture and government/private jobs. Some villagers are employed in government services and many people are doing private jobs in other states and countries.

== Transport ==
Rodoo is connected to nearby villages through the road network with presence of State Transport Service and Private Bus Services which link it to Ladnu, Didwana.

== Geography ==
Rodu is located at 27.6050°N 74.5893°E. Rodu is home to people from various castes and religions. Among the Hindu population, the major castes include Rajputs and Jaats (Beniwal, Tandi, Saran, Tholiya, Birda, Godhra, Bijarniya). In addition, a significant number of people from other communities, often grouped under the umbrella term 'Meghwals,' also reside in the region. The village also has a notable population of Brahmins, primarily bearing the title 'Sharma.' Muslims form a significant part of the population as well, with prominent Muslims with surname Bhati, Kayamkhani, Hatikhani, Kazi, and Maniyaar(mugals). Moreover, a small portion of the population is contributed by the Aacharya surnames.

== Demographics ==
As of 2001 India Census, Rodu had a population of 5613. The male population is 2847, while the female population is 2766.
