= Man Singh =

Man Singh may refer to:

- Man Singh Tomar (1443–1516), Maharaja of Gwalior
- Man Singh I (1550–1614), Raja of Amber
- Man Singh of Marwar (1783–1843), Maharaja of Jodhpur
- Raj Man Singh Chitrakar (1797–1865), Nepalese artist
- Man Singh (dacoit) (1890–1955), Indian dacoit
- Man Mohan Singh (pilot) (1906–1942), Indian pilot and Indian Air Force officer
- Man Singh II (1912–1970), Maharaja of Jaipur
- Ganesh Man Singh (1915–1997), Nepalese politician
- Manmohan Singh (1932–2024), Indian economist and prime minister of India
- P. R. Man Singh (born 1938), Indian cricketer and cricket administrator
- Prakash Man Singh (born 1956), Nepalese politician, son of Ganesh Man Singh
- Narendra Man Singh (1958–2009), Nepalese footballer
- Man Singh Kinsariya (born 1960), Indian politician
- Upendra Man Singh (born 1973), Nepalese footballer
