= Harnawa =

Harnawa Harnawa Patti
- Village
- Location in Rajasthan, India Harnawa (India)
- Coordinates: 26.89°N 74.52°E
- Country: India
- State: Rajasthan
- District: Nagaur

Government
  - Body: Gram panchayat

Population (2001)
  - Total: 5,034

Languages
  - Official: Hindi
- Time zone: UTC+5:30 (IST)
- PIN: 341501
- Telephone code: +911588
- ISO 3166 code: IN-RJ
- Vehicle registration: RJ 37
- Website: www.mertiya.in

Harnawa is a village in Parbatsar Tehsil of Nagaur district in the Indian state of Rajasthan.

The village situated midway between Degana railway station and Parbatsar towns Near Gachhipura railway station.

== Geography ==
Harnawa is located at 26.89°N 74.52°E.

== How to reach Harnawa ==
Harnawa can be reached from Parbatsar - Piplod - Kanwlad - Janjila - Badu - Harnawa and another way from Parbatsar is Parbatsar - Huldhani - Badu - Harnawa. One can also come from Merta City - Bherunda - Harsore - Bhakri - Harnawa. From Jaipur, Harnawa can be reached via Kishangarh.

== Demographics ==
As of 2001 India census, Harnawa had a population of 5,034. Males constitute 2527 of the population and females 2507.
