= Chhoti Khatu =

Locality in Rajasthan, India

- Tehsil
- Country: India
- State: Rajasthan
- District: Didwana Kuchaman District

Population (2011)
  - Total: 10,865
- Time zone: UTC+5:30 (IST)
- PIN: 341302

Chhoti Khatu is a new tehsil located in the Didwana Kuchaman District of the northwestern Indian state of Rajasthan. It is 65 km (40 mi) away from Nagaur and 30 km (19 mi) away from Didwana. Chhoti Khatu is a tourist place of archaeological interest. Chhoti Khatu also has a railway station as named Chhoti Khatu railway station. Also Chhoti Khatu's Poornima Pareek won the title of Miss Forever Rajasthan 2022. Chhoti Khatu has a total population of 10865 peoples according to Census 2011.

== See also ==
- Chhoti Khatu railway station
