= Gaur (clan) =

Clan of Rajputs in India

Gaur Rajputs
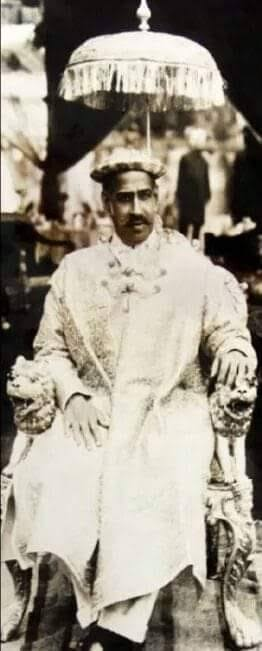
- A Gaur Rajput aristocrat from Powayan.
- Jāti: Rajput
- Gotra: Bhardwaj, Kashyap
- Religions: Hinduism,
- Languages: Hindustani(Hindi-Urdu), Punjabi, Rajasthani languages
- Country: Pakistan, India
- Region: Punjab, Rajasthan, Uttar Pradesh, Madhya Pradesh
- Feudal title: Raja; Rana

Gaur also known as "Gour" is a Rajput clan. They have ancient ancestry and find mention by James Tod as one of 36 royal races in his book Annals and Antiquities of Rajasthan.

== Gaur dynasty rule in India ==
=== Rajasthan ===
The Gaur Rajputs once held a prominent position in Ajmer till the time of Prithviraj Chauhan. The Gorwar and Gaurawati/Gaurati regions gets their name from this clan. In later years they lost the territories of Pali, Jalore, Sirohi, Kuchaman, Maroth, Ajmer, Some area of Shekhawati which was ruled by the Gaur Rajputs of Gaurati. In 15th century, they fought at least 13 battles with Shekhawats. In one of these battles Rao Shekha, the patriarch of shekhawats lost his life fighting against Gaur Rājpūts.

The Rajgarh territory was one of the last bastion of Gaur Rajputs during the times of Britishers. Gaur Rajputs remained allies to Mughal till the time of Aurangzeb, whose political decisions, alienated Rathores, Sisodias, Hadas and Gaur Rajputs from Mughals.

=== Uttar Pradesh ===
Outside, Rajasthan, the Chief of Chamraoli (near Unnao), a Gaur Rajput, was held in high esteem by Alwar Raj and was amongst the very few who were given honor of tazim.

=== Madhya Pradesh ===
Sheopur town and fort was founded by Gaur rulers in 1573.

=== War of Independence ===
During the Indian Rebellion of 1857, Dariyav Chandra Gaur, the Raja of Naar Kahinjari estate near Cawnpore, rebelled against British forces, turning the fort into a local stronghold. From his fort, he and allied forces resisted British EIC troops for several days, reportedly capturing the local tehsil treasury and forcing temporary British withdrawal from parts of the Kanpur region. British forces suffered losses in various attempts to capture him, they then ambushed him using betrayal, captured him and bombarded his fort. He was then hanged from a Neem tree at Rasulabad tehsil compound as a public warning and his ancestral fort was partly demolished. He is remembered locally for his role in the uprising.

== Notable Rulers ==
- Raja Gopal Das Gaud of Raja Lakhari
- Raja Hem Shah of Dhaudhar Riyasat.
- Veer Raja Dariyav Chandra Gaur

== Population ==
Their population today is found in Indian States of Rajasthan, Bihar, Jharkhand, parts of Uttar Pradesh and parts of Madhya Pradesh.
