= Tazimi =

Indian caste system

Tazim was a medieval system of respect given to some noble persons in India mostly rajputs and charans. During the medieval period, not everyone was allowed to wear gold. Among some of those castes who were allowed to wear it, even they were not allowed to wear the gold in the foot, except for the ladies. A Tazimdar was allowed to bear the gold on the foot, and in front of a king. He also enjoyed other respects, therefore Tazimi means a person who enjoyed respect in Royal Court, including wearing gold on the foot.

== Tazimi-sardar in the Shekhawati region ==
"The Marwaris arose from the Shekhawati region and served in the courts of different princely states. The Marwaris continued to remain loyal to their princes who had honoured them with the extremely rare appellation of tazimi-sardar, given to the very select. A tazimi-sardar was allowed to continue sitting in the presence of the maharaja and allowed to wear gold on his feet, a privilege rarely extended to people outside the immediate circle of the royal family. It was the aristocracy which was usually so honoured and for the few Marwari seths who were awarded the title, it became a matter of family prestige."

== Tazimi Sardars in Kashmir ==
The Jammu and Kashmir Constitution Act 1939 specifies two Tazimi Sardars:

1. Jammu Province including Chenani and Poonch Jagirs
2. Kashmir Province including Frontier Districts

== Some prominent tazimi charan sirdars ==
Kaviraj Barisal Ji.—Born on 1st January 1911. Is the eldest son of ‘Kaviraj Muraridan Ji, Charan of the State. Holds a Muat of Rs. 3,015 p. a. Is a hereditary Double Tazimi Sardar.

== See also ==
- Panch Mahal Maroth
- Jiliya
