= Ramniwas Gawriya =

Indian politician

Member of Rajasthan Legislative Assembly
- Incumbent
- Assumed office 11 December 2018
- Preceded by: Man Singh Kinsariya
- Constituency: Parbatsar

Personal details
- Born: 9 October 1991 (age 35) Jasrana, Didwana Kuchaman, Rajasthan, India
- Party: Indian National Congress
- Spouse: Dr. Monika Saran
- Children: 1
- Education: M.A.
- Occupation: Farmer

Ramniwas Gawriya is an Indian politician from Rajasthan. He was elected to the Rajasthan Legislative Assembly from Parbatsar as a member of the Indian National Congress. Previously he has been a member of National Students' Union of India.
