= Matasukha =

Matasukha is a mid sized village located in the district of Nagaur in the state of Rajasthan in India.

According to Census 2011 information, the location code or village code of Matasukha village is 083948. Matasukha is located in Nawa Tehsil of Nagaur district in Rajasthan, India. It is situated 32 km away from sub-district headquarter Nawa and 207 km away from district headquarter Nagaur.

The total geographical area of village is 514 hectares. Matasukha has a total population of 1,479 peoples. There are about 249 houses in Matasukha. Nawa is nearest town to Matasukha which is approximately 32 km away.

Agricultural status of Matasukha village The count of working people of Matasukha village is 641 yet 638 are non-working. And out of 641 working individual 318 peoples are entirely dependent on farming.
