= Maulasar =

- Town
- Location in Rajasthan, India Maulasar (India)
- Coordinates: 27.30°N 74.73°E
- Country: India
- State: Rajasthan
- District: Didwana Kuchaman
- Elevation: 379 m (1,243 ft)

Languages
  - Official: Hindi
- Time zone: UTC+5:30 (IST)
- PIN: 341506
- ISO 3166 code: RJ-IN

Maulasar is a village and block in Didwana tehsil of Didwana Kuchaman District in Rajasthan.
