= Vijay Singh Chaudhary =

Indian politician

Minister of State, Government of Rajasthan
- Incumbent
- Assumed office 30 December 2023
- Chief Minister: Bhajan Lal Sharma
- Ministry and Departments: List: Revenue; Colonization; Sainik Welfare
- Preceded by: Rajendra Singh Gudha

Member of the Rajasthan Legislative Assembly
- Incumbent
- Assumed office 3 December 2023
- Preceded by: Mahendra Chaudhary
- Constituency: Nawan
- In office 2013–2018
- Preceded by: Mahendra Chaudhary
- Succeeded by: Mahendra Chaudhary
- Constituency: Nawan

Pradhan, Panchayat Samiti Kuchaman City
- In office 2011–2013

Personal details
- Born: 20 August 1969 (age 56) Shravanapura, Nawa, Rajasthan, Rajasthan
- Party: Bharatiya Janata Party
- Spouse: Santosh Devi
- Children: 3
- Education: B.A.
- Alma mater: University of Rajasthan
- Occupation: MLA
- Profession: Agriculture

Vijay Singh Chaudhary, also known as Vijay Chaudhary, is an Indian politician from Rajasthan. He is currently serving as Minister of State for Revenue, Colonization and Sainik Welfare in the Government of Rajasthan under the leadership of Chief Minister Bhajan Lal Sharma.

He was elected as a Member of the Rajasthan Legislative Assembly from the Nawan Assembly constituency in 2013 and again in 2023. He is a member of the Bharatiya Janata Party.

== Political career ==
Vijay Singh Chaudhary began his political journey at the grassroots level, serving as the Pradhan of Panchayat Samiti, Kuchaman City, from 2011 to 2013. He contested the Rajasthan Legislative Assembly election in 2013 from the Nawan constituency and was elected as an MLA from the Bharatiya Janata Party. He lost the seat in 2018 but won it back in the 2023 election.

== Minister ==
Following the formation of the BJP-led government in Rajasthan in December 2023 under Chief Minister Bhajan Lal Sharma, Vijay Singh Chaudhary was inducted into the council of ministers as a Minister of State. He was assigned independent charge of the Revenue, Colonization, and Sainik Welfare departments.

== Electoral record ==
Election results
Year	Office	Constituency	Party	Votes (Vijay Singh)	%	Opponent	Opponent Party	Votes	%	Result	Ref
2023	MLA	Nawan	Bharatiya Janata Party	106,159	52.53	Mahendra Choudhary	Indian National Congress	82,211	40.68	Won	
2018	MLA	Nawan	Bharatiya Janata Party	69,912	39.77	Mahendra Choudhary	Indian National Congress	72,168	41.06	Lost	
2013	MLA	Nawan	Bharatiya Janata Party	85,008	55.23	Mahendra Choudhary	Indian National Congress	55,229	35.88	Won	
