= Nimbi Jodha =

Nimbi Jodhan jodha ka shar
- Town
- Nickname: nebi
- Location within Rajasthan Location within India
- Coordinates: 27.533°N 74.343°E
- Country: India
- State: Rajasthan
- District: Nagaur
- Tehsil: Ladnu

Area
  - Water: 474 km^{2} (183 sq mi)
  - Rank: 21
- Elevation: 330 m (1,080 ft)

Population (2011)
  - Total: 11,614

Languages
  - Official: Hindi; English
  - Regional: Marwari
- Pin: 341316
- STD Code: 01581
- Vehicle registration: RJ-37 & RJ-21

Nimbi Jodha is a town in Ladnu, Nagaur District, Rajasthan, India. It belongs to Ajmer Division. It is located 75 km east of the district headquarters, Nagaur, and 51 km from Salasar Balaji.

Established in the 16th century (1627), the total geographical area of village is 6614.51 hectares. As of the last census, Nimbi Jodhan has a total population of 11,614 people, with male population is 5,938 and a female population is 5,676.

== Transport ==
=== Rail ===
The nearest railway station is Ladnun (LAU), part of the North Western Railway.

=== Road ===
A two-lane national highway NH-58 passes through the centre of town. NH-58 connects Nimbi Jodha with Nagaur and Salasar Balaji.

State Highway RJ SH 59 passes through the centre of town.

=== Air ===
The nearest airport to Nimbi Jodha is Jaipur International Airport, which hosts daily flights to Delhi, Mumbai, Hyderabad, Bangalore, Pune, Surat, Indore, Ahmedabad, Shirdi, Chennai, Guwahati, Kolkata, Udaipur, Varanasi, Agra, Dehradun, Cochin, Lucknow, Bhopal, Jaisalmer, Bikaner, Jodhpur, Bangkok, Kuala Lumpur, Dubai, Sharjah, Muscat. Air strip at Parihara village is available for small air craft.

== Notables ==
- Motilal Vora, former Chief Minister of Madhya Pradesh.
- Kishore Biyani, founder of Future Group.

== Administration ==
Nimbi Jodha is governed by a Panchayat Samiti, which comes under the Ladnun tehsil. The Sarpanch is Vijay Singh Sisodiya elected in 2026. It's Member of Legislative Assembly is Mukesh Bhakar INC, elected in 2023 and it's Member of Parliament is Hanuman Beniwal (Rashtriya Loktantrik Party/NDA) elected in 2024.

- Sh Vijay Singh Sisodiya (2026–Present)
- Smt Suman Khichar (2020–2026)
- Sh.Shyam Sunder Panwar (2015–2020)
- Sh.Jhabbar Singh Chauhan (2010–2015)
- Sh. Shri Ram Khichar (2005–2010)
- Smt Rami Devi Khichar (2000–2005)
- Lt. Mahaveer Prasad Bohra (1995–2000)
- Lt. Ratan Das Swami (1975–1990)
- Lt. Nand Lal Pandiya
- Lt. Ummed Singh Jodha
- Lt. Chattar Singh Sisodiya
- Lt. Bhikulal Sarda

== Guest houses ==
- Bhanwar Place (Sadar Bazar)
- Satsang Bhawan (Bus Stand)
- Bansi Atithi Bhawan (Near Govt School)
- Govind Bhawan (Sadar Bazar)
- Maheshwari Bhawan ( Near Govt Hospital)

== Education ==
Nimbi Jodha has Senior Secondary Schools in English and Hindi.
