= Man Singh Kinsariya =

Indian politician

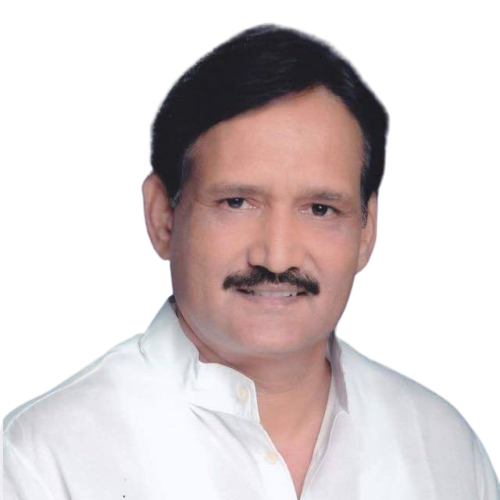
- Man Singh Kinsariya, former MLA Parbatsar

Member of the Rajasthan Legislative Assembly
- In office 8 December 2008 – 11 December 2018
- Preceded by: Rakesh Meghwal
- Succeeded by: Ramniwas Gawriya
- Constituency: Parbatsar

Personal details
- Born: 5 September 1960 (age 65) Kinsariya (किनसरिया), Parbatsar, Nagaur
- Party: Bhartiya Janta Party
- Spouse: Smt. Manju Rathore
- Children: 3
- Education: (B.Com.), S S Jain Subodh College

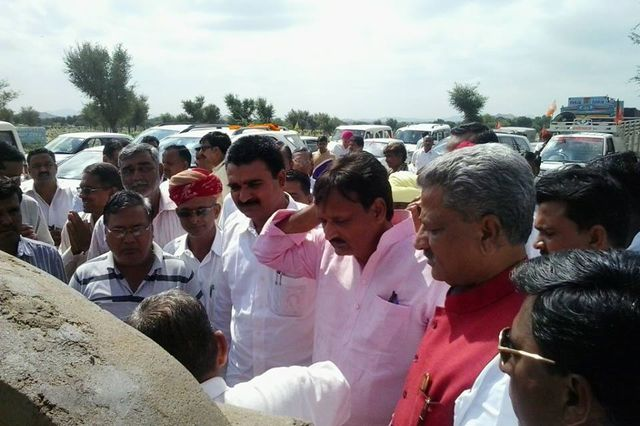
Kinsariya

Man Singh Kinsariya {मान सिंह किनसरिया} is an Indian politician. He was a Member of the Rajasthan Legislative Assembly, from the BJP representing Parbatsar constituency for two terms from 2008 to 2018.

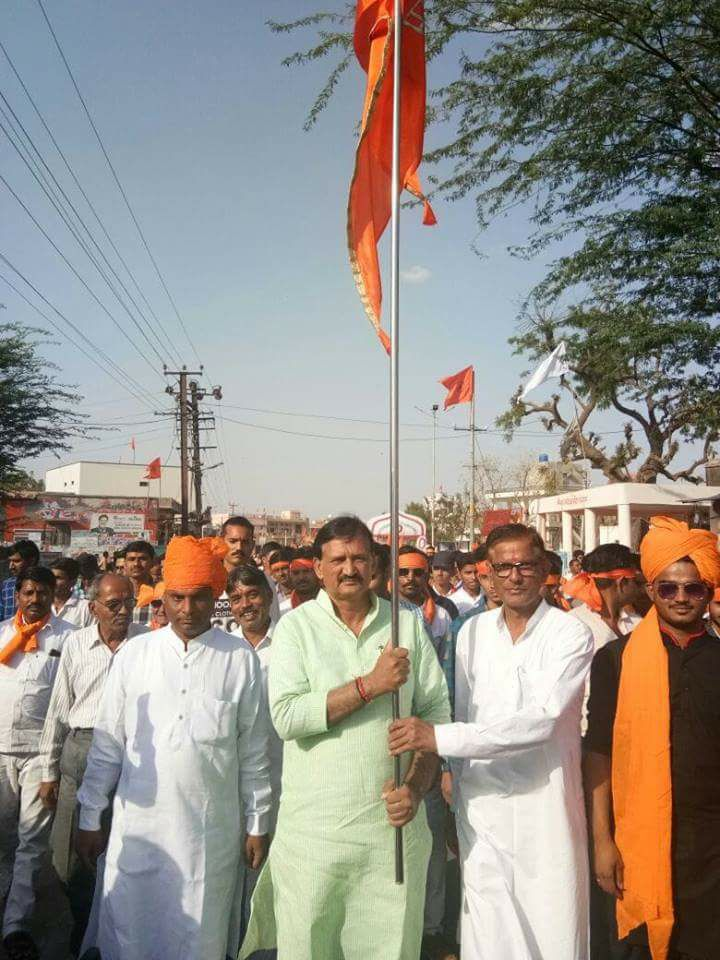
Kinsariya

== Early life ==
Man Singh Kinsariya was born on 5 September 1960 in Kinsariya (किनसरिया) village, Parbatsar, District Nagaur, Rajasthan. Singh was born in (Mertiya) Rathore family. His father is Sheshmal Singh Rathore. He is descendant of Rao Jaimal Rathore. Singh uses Kinsariya as surname to represent his village.

== Education and Career ==
Singh was schooled in his village and then obtained his B.Com. at S S Jain Subodh College, Jaipur. He was elected as parshad at Jaipur Nagar Nigam in 1988–93. He was also the member of Bhawani Niketan Shikshan Sansthan, Jaipur. He was also elected as Pradesh Mantri and Pradesh Mahamantri in Kishan Morcha BJP.

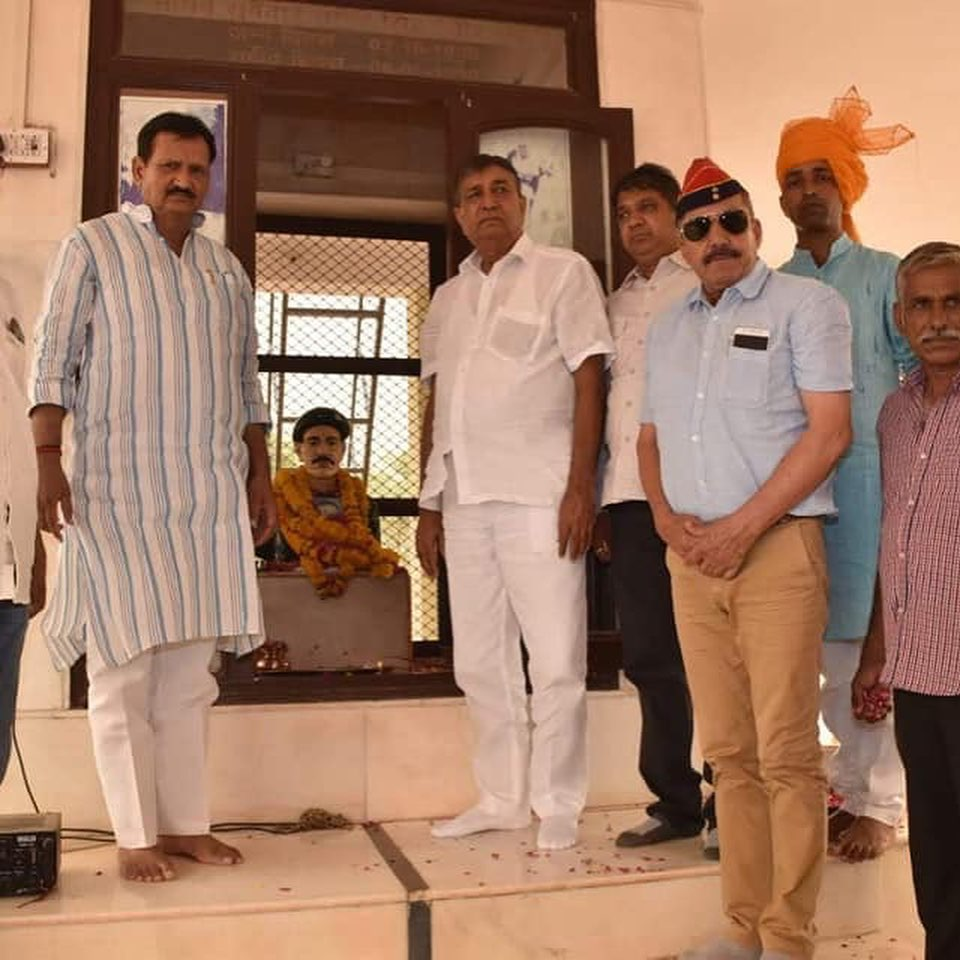
Kinsariya

== Political career ==
SI No.	Assembly	Tenure	Constituency	Party
1.	13th Rajasthan; Legislative Assembly.	2008 – 2013	Parbatsar	Bharatiya Janata Party
2.	14th Rajasthan; Legislative Assembly.	2013 – 2018	Parbatsar	Bharatiya Janata Party
