= Parbatsar Assembly constituency =

Legislative Assembly constituency in Rajasthan State, India

Coordinates: 26.89°N 74.76°E

Parbatsar
- Constituency No. 114 for the Rajasthan Legislative Assembly

Constituency details
- Country: India
- Region: North India
- State: Rajasthan
- District: Nagaur
- Lok Sabha constituency: Nagaur
- Established: 1972
- Total electors: 250,433
- Reservation: None

Member of Legislative Assembly
- 16th Rajasthan Legislative Assembly
- Incumbent Ramniwas Gawriya
- Party: Indian National Congress
- Elected year: 2023

Parbatsar Assembly constituency is one of the 200 Legislative Assembly constituencies of Rajasthan state in India.

It is part of Nagaur district.

== Members of the Legislative Assembly ==
Year	Member	Party
1998	Mohan Lal Chauhan	Indian National Congress
2003	Rakesh Meghwal	Bharatiya Janata Party
2008	Man Singh Kinsariya	Bharatiya Janata Party
2013	Man Singh Kinsariya	Bharatiya Janata Party
2018	Ramniwas Gawriya	Indian National Congress
2023	Ramniwas Gawriya	Indian National Congress

== Election results ==
=== 2023 ===
2023 Rajasthan Legislative Assembly election: Parbatsar
Party	Candidate	Votes	%	±%
INC	Ramniwas Gawriya	91,530	46.52	+1.76
BJP	Mansingh Kinsariya	81,214	41.27	+5.0
RLP	Lachchharam Badarda	20,195	10.26	
NOTA	None of the above	1,342	0.68	−0.78
Majority		10,316	5.25	−3.24
Turnout		196,771	78.57	+1.04
INC hold		Swing		

=== 2018 ===
Rajasthan Legislative Assembly Election, 2018: Parbatsar
Party	Candidate	Votes	%	±%
INC	Ramniwas Gawdiya	76,373	44.76	
BJP	Man Singh Kinsariya	61,888	36.27	
Independent	Rakesh Meghwal	26,006	15.24	
NOTA	None of the above	2,485	1.46	
Majority		14,485	8.49	
Turnout		170,623	77.53	

== See also ==
- List of constituencies of the Rajasthan Legislative Assembly
- Nagaur district
