= Baldoo =

Village in Rajasthan, India

Baldoo (or Baldu) is a village located in Ladnu Tehsil, Didwana Kuchaman District, in Rajasthan, India.

Baldoo is one of the largest villages in Ladnu.
