= Bankliya =

Bakaliya
- Village
- Location in Rajasthan, India Bakaliya (India)
- Coordinates: 27.56°N 74.43°E
- Country: India
- State: Rajasthan
- District: Didwana Kuchaman

Government
  - Body: Gram panchayat

Population (2011)
  - Total: 2,923

Languages
  - Official: Hindi
- Time zone: UTC+5:30 (IST)
- PIN: 341306
- ISO 3166 code: RJ-IN
- Vehicle registration: RJ37

Bankliya Gram Panchayat Bakliya is a village in Ladnu tehsil of Didwana Kuchaman District in the Indian state of Rajasthan.

The village is situated on mega highway Kishangarh to Hanumangarh between Ladnun and Didwana.24 km from Didwana and 09 km from Ladnun. same connected on Sikar to Nagaur state highway.

== Geography ==
Bakaliya is located at 27.56°N 74.43°E.

== School ==
02 Government schools and 03 Private schools.

== Goshala ==
Shree Krishna Goshala in west side of village.

== Temple ==
श्री बाबा रामदेव जी मंदिर, बाकलिया बेड रोड. श्री संकट मोचन बालाजी मंदिर, बाकलिया बेड रोड. श्री तालाब बालाजी मंदिर, मुख्य तालाब. श्री भैरूजी महाराज, टंकी के पीछे. श्री हरिराम जी मंदिर, टंकी के पास. श्री बाबा रामदेव जी मंदिर, गर्ल्स स्कूल. श्री ठाकुर जी मंदिर, मंदिर बास. श्री शिव मंदिर, आम गुवाड़. श्री बाबा रामदेव जी मंदिर, अगुणा बास. श्री मंदिर, पीपल गट्टा अगुणा बास. श्री भैरूजी महाराज (खेजड़ी), बस स्टैंड रोड. सती माता मंदिर, खन्नोई. श्री तेजाजी मंदिर, संगलाई. श्री शिव मंदिर, भेड़ फार्म. श्री बालाजी मंदिर, निश्लाव.

== Demographics ==
As of 2011 India census, Bakaliya had a population of 2,923. Males constitute 1,484 of the population and females 1,439.
