= Ber, Rajasthan =

Village in India

Coordinates: 27.5437°N 74.3942°E

Ber is a village in Nagaur district, Rajasthan, India. According to the 2011 census of India, it had a population of 1,050 people: 538 men and 512 women. It is in the gram panchayat of Bakliya. Its Postal Index Number is 341316 and is organised within the Ladnu Tehsil.
