= Devli Kalan =

Devli Kalan Devli
- Village
- Location in Rajasthan, India Devli Kalan (India)
- Coordinates: 27.103586°N 75.246566°E
- Country: India
- State: Rajasthan
- District: Didwana Kuchaman

Government
  - Sarpanch: Ramnivas Nehra
- Elevation: 394.522 m (1,294.36 ft)

Population (2011)
  - Total: 32,340

Languages
  - Official: Marwari, Hindi
- Time zone: UTC+5:30 (IST)
- PIN: 341507
- Telephone code: 01586
- ISO 3166 code: RJ-IN

Devli Kalan is a village in Nawa Tehsil in Didwana Kuchaman district of Rajasthan State, India. It belongs to Ajmer Division . It is located 176 km towards East from the district headquarters, Nagaur, and 60 km from the state capital, Jaipur.

== Population ==
The Devli Kalan village has total 641 families residing with population of 3361 of which 1721 are males while 1640 are females as per Population Census 2011. In Devli Kalan village population of children with age 0-6 is 421 which makes up 12.53% of total population of village. Average Sex Ratio of Devli Kalan village is 953 which is higher than Rajasthan state average of 928. Child Sex Ratio for the Deoli Kalan as per census is 871, lower than Rajasthan average of 888.

Devli Kalan village has higher literacy rate compared to Rajasthan. In 2011, literacy rate of Devli Kalan village was 67.69% compared to 66.11% of Rajasthan. In Devli Kalan Male literacy stands at 82.35% while female literacy rate was 52.49%.

== Work Profile ==
In Devli Kalan village out of total population, 1353 were engaged in work activities. 82.93% of workers describe their work as Main Work (Employment or Earning more than 6 Months) while 17.07% were involved in Marginal activity providing livelihood for less than 6 months. Of 1353 workers engaged in Main Work, 714 were cultivators (owner or co-owner) while 100 were Agricultural labourer.
