= Mahendra Chaudhary =

Indian politician

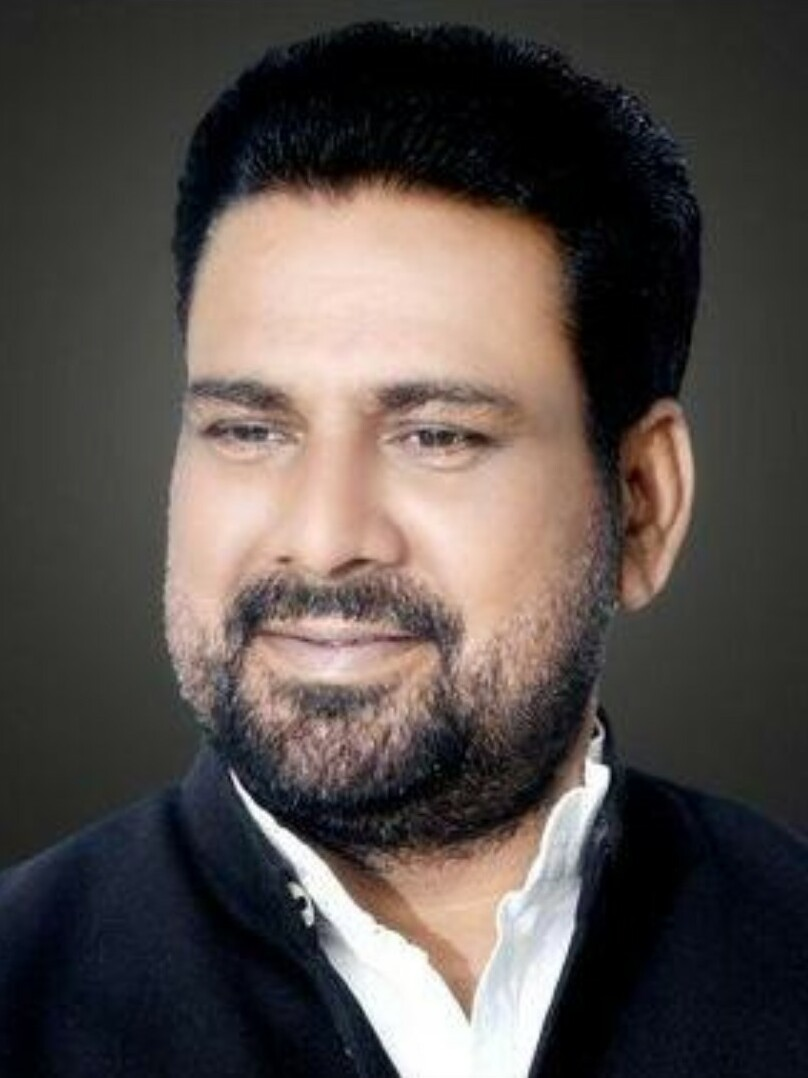
- Mahendra Chaudhary in 2022

Deputy Chief Whip of Rajasthan Legislative Assembly
- In office 15 January 2019 – 03 December 2023

Member, Committee on Public Undertakings of Rajasthan Legislative Assembly
- In office 2009–2013
- Constituency: Nawan

Member of Legislative Assembly
- In office 2018–2023
- Preceded by: Vijay Singh Chaudhary
- Succeeded by: Vijay Singh Chaudhary
- Constituency: Nawan
- In office 2008–2013
- Preceded by: Harish Kumawat
- Succeeded by: Vijay Singh Chaudhary
- Constituency: Nawan

Personal details
- Born: 26 June 1969 (age 57) Maharajpura, Rajasthan, India
- Party: Indian National Congress
- Spouse: Sunita Chaudhary (m. 1999)
- Children: 2
- Parent(s): Hanuman Singh (father); Gumani Devi (mother)
- Education: BA, LLB, Diploma in Criminal Law & Taxation Rajasthan University
- Profession: Politician; Farmer; Lawyer

Mahendra Chaudhary is an Indian politician. He was a member of the 13th Assembly and 15th Assembly of Rajasthan representing the Nawan as an Indian National Congress member.

== Early life ==
Mahendra Chaudhary was born in June 1969 in Maharajpura, Nawan. He is the son of Hanuman Singh (Ex-MLA from Nawan) and Gumani Devi. He completed his school education from Government Senior Secondary School, Nawan. Apart from this, he has completed BA from Lal Bhadur Shastri College, Jaipur and LLB from University College of Law, Rajasthan University.

== Personal life ==
Mahendra Chaudhary is born to Advocate Hanuman Singh and Gumani Devi. He hails from political background. His father was MLA from Nawan Assembly constituency which is the same he is from in fifth Rajasthan Legislative assembly. His mother was Pradhan from Kuchaman Panchyat Samiti. Mahendra was married to Sunita Chaudhary who was the Zila Pramukh of Nagaur Zila Parishad. The couple have 2 children, one daughter and one son.

== Political career ==
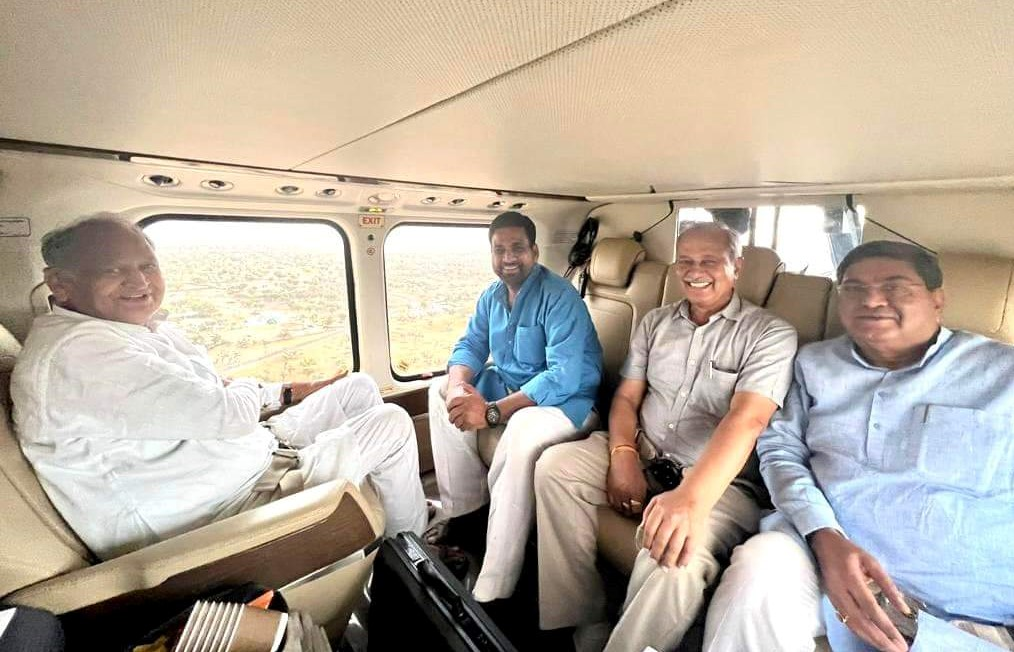
Mahendra Chaudhary with Ashok Gehlot in May 2023

Mahendra Chaudhary started his political career as an independent President of Student Union, Lal Bahadur Shastri College, Jaipur (1986–87); He was also a President Student Union, University of Rajasthan, Jaipur (1995–96). First time he was elected as a member of legislative assembly in 2008–13 and later in 2018 from Nawan, Nagaur. He was Government Deputy Chief Whip, Rajasthan Legislative Assembly and member of Rajasthan Pradesh Congress Committee.

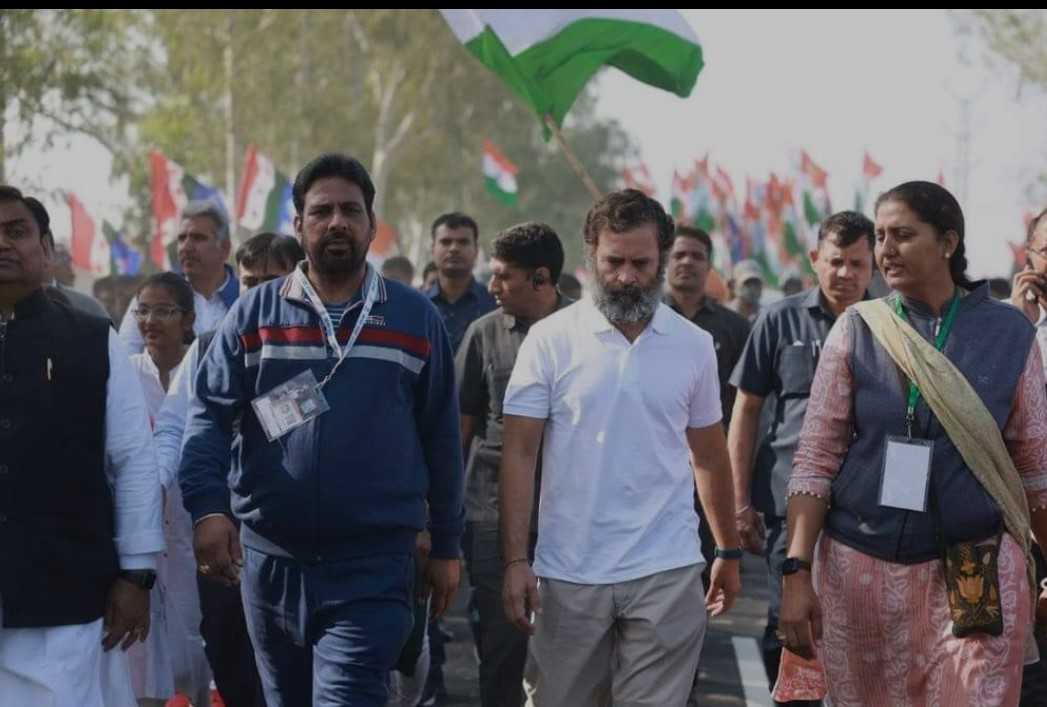
Mahendra Chaudhary with Rahul Gandhi in Bharat Jodo Yatra

== Positions held ==
=== Membership of Legislature ===
Membership of Legislature
2008–2013	Member, 13th Rajasthan Legislative Assembly
2018-2019	Member, 15th Rajasthan Legislative Assembly

=== Government Posts Held ===
Government Posts Held
2009–2013	Member, Committee on Public Undertakings, Rajasthan Legislative Assembly
2019-2023	Government Deputy Chief Whip, Rajasthan Legislative Assembly

=== Party Posts Held ===
Party Posts Held
1985–1998	Vice President, NSUI, Rajasthan
1998–2008	Member, Rajasthan Pradesh Congress Committee
1998–2005	Vice President, Rajasthan Youth Congress

=== Other Posts Held ===
Other Posts Held
1984	President, Student Union, Govt. Senior Secondary School, Nawan
1986–1987	President, Student Union, Lal Bahadur Shastri College, Jaipur
1992–1993	President, Student Union, Law College, Jaipur
1994–1995	Member, Panchayat Samiti, Kuchaman City, Nagaur
1995–1996	President Student Union, University of Rajasthan, Jaipur
