= Nawan Assembly constituency =

Legislative Assembly constituency in Rajasthan State, India

Coordinates: 28.47°N 75.55°E

Nawan
- Constituency No. 115 for the Rajasthan Legislative Assembly

Constituency details
- Country: India
- Region: North India
- State: Rajasthan
- District: Nagaur
- Lok Sabha constituency: Nagaur
- Established: 1972
- Total electors: 269,093
- Reservation: None

Member of Legislative Assembly
- 16th Rajasthan Legislative Assembly
- Incumbent Vijay Singh Chaudhary
- Party: Bharatiya Janata Party
- Elected year: 2023

Nawan Assembly constituency is one of the 200 Legislative Assembly constituencies of Rajasthan state in India.

It comprises part of Nawan tehsil, in Nagaur district. As of 2023, its representative is Vijay Singh Chaudhary of the Bharatiya Janata Party.

== Members of the Legislative Assembly ==
Election	Name	Party
2008	Mahendra Chaudhary	Indian National Congress
2013	Vijay Singh	Bharatiya Janata Party
2018	Mahendra Chaudhary	Indian National Congress
2023	Vijay Singh Chaudhary	Bharatiya Janata Party

== Election results ==
=== 2023 ===
2023 Rajasthan Legislative Assembly election: Nawan
Party	Candidate	Votes	%	±%
BJP	Vijay Singh	106,159	52.53	+12.76
INC	Mahendra Choudhary	82,211	40.68	−0.38
Independent	Ravi Meghwal Lunwa	3,738	1.85	
ASP(KR)	Govind Ram	3,041	1.5	
NOTA	None of the above	1,364	0.67	−0.51
Majority		23,948	11.85	+10.56
Turnout		202,101	75.1	+1.98
BJP gain from INC		Swing		

=== 2018 ===
Rajasthan Legislative Assembly Election, 2018: Nawan
Party	Candidate	Votes	%	±%
INC	Mahendra Choudhary	72,168	41.06	
BJP	Vijay Singh	69,912	39.77	
Independent	Shimbhudayal	12,218	6.95	
CPI(M)	Kanaram	6,717	3.82	
Independent	Govind Ram	5,424	3.09	
BSP	Pramod Kumar	3,029	1.72	
NOTA	None of the above	2,077	1.18	
Majority		2,256	1.29	
Turnout		175,780	73.12	

== See also ==
- List of constituencies of the Rajasthan Legislative Assembly
- Nagaur district
