= Abhaypura =

Indian village

Coordinates: 28°33′N 75°11′E

Abhaypura is a village in Nawa tehsil of Didwana Kuchaman District of Rajasthan state in India, named after Maharaja Abhay Singh of Marwar.
