= Jiliya =

- village
- Location in Rajasthan, India Jiliya (India)
- Coordinates: 27.14°N 74.51°E
- Country: India
- State: Rajasthan
- District: Nagaur
- Elevation: 486 m (1,594 ft)

Population (2001)
  - Total: 7,000

Languages
  - Official: Hindi
- Time zone: UTC+5:30 (IST)
- PIN: 341508
- Telephone code: 01586
- ISO 3166 code: RJ-IN
- Website: uq.net.au/~zzhsoszy/ips/j/jiliya.html

Jiliya is a village in Nagaur District of Rajasthan, India.

== History ==
During British rule in India, Jiliya, Abhaypura, or Maroth (alternative names of the same principality) was a Thikana under the erstwhile Princely State of Jodhpur. As per Indira Gandhi National Centre for the Arts, the paintings of the Man Mandir Temple of Maroth, Rajasthan best depict the art form of the 17th Century Rajputana.

A volunteer program known as the Jiliya Project, run by the Sankalp Volunteer Society NGO, is active in the region as Nagaur is one of the economically underdeveloped districts of the state. Being a desert area, it also suffers from a lack of water which makes the situation even worse for agricultural activities.

== Medical and infrastructure facilities ==
There are few government and private medical aid centers, hospitals, or dispensaries in Jiliya, and nearby hospitals are at Kuchaman City.

- Hospitals & dispensaries in Jiliya.
- Health facilities: Two government hospital & 3-4 dispensaries in Jiliya.

== General information ==
- Religion: 99% of the population are Hindus
- Geographical Location: 13 km from Kuchaman City
- Temperature: Max. 44 °C in June, Min. 1 °C in January
- Monsoon Season: June to July
- Annual Rainfall: 412 mm
- Census Code: 01892800
