= Maroth, Rajasthan =

Maroth Maharashtra Nagara, Maharotha
- Village
- Location in Rajasthan, India Maroth (India)
- Coordinates: 27.096668°N 75.085952°E
- Country: India
- State: Rajasthan
- District: Didwana Kuchaman

Government
  - Body: Gram panchayat
- Elevation: 369 m (1,211 ft)

Population (2011)
  - Total: 8,330

Languages
  - Official: marwari
- Time zone: UTC+5:30 (IST)
- PIN: 341507
- Telephone code: 01586-277***
- ISO 3166 code: RJ-IN
- Vehicle registration: RJ-21

Maroth is a village located in Nawa, Didwana Kuchaman district, in the state of Rajasthan, India. The area surrounding the village is named Gaurati, which means "The Land of Gaurs".

Maroth is located approximately 11 kilometres (6.8 mi) from both Nawa and the railway station of Kuchaman city.

== Location ==
Maroth is located along State Highway Number 19, which links Jodhpur to Jaipur. Maroth has one bus stop which connects the village to Kuchaman City and a railway station near the village in which trains going to Jodhpur from Jaipur stop.

== History ==
In the Hammira mahakavya of Nayachandrasuri (14th century A.D.), its name is mentioned as Maharashtra nagara. This name was used even up to the eighteenth century A.D. as is clear from the epigraphical records. In Apabhraṃśa, it is known as Maharotha.

As Maroth is surrounded by hills, the ruling chiefs, seeing its strategical position, selected it for constructing forts to have a hold over the prized country of salt producing Sambhar Lake. It is said to be ruled by various Rajput dynasties like Chandellas (of Rewasa and Kasumbi-Udaipurwati), Dahiyas (of Parbatsar and Maroth), Pratiharas (of Kuchaman), Chalukyas (i.e., Solankis) and Chauhans (of Ajmer and Sambhar).

This region is called Gaudati/Gaurawati/Gaurati on account of its fierce Gaur Rajputs rulers.The Gaur Rajputs ruled the region around Maroth for centuries. Over the course of history, they increased their influence and expanded their kingdom. The Gaur people fought alongside the Amber Kingdom early in their history. In the early 16th century, a man named Ridhmal became the kiledar of Maroth and the war general of the Gaur rulers of the region. Riddmal was a military commander of the Gaurs and fought several battles against local rival Rao Shekha, consolidating all the Gaur people under his control and fighting against Shekha. However, Ridhmal was forced to enter into a treaty with Raymal, the son of Rao Shekha.
