= Sunari =

- Village
- Location in Rajasthan, India Sunari (Rajasthan)
- Coordinates: 27°38′12.60″N 74°19′57.88″E
- Country: India
- State: Rajasthan
- District: Nagaur

Population (2011)
  - Total: 4,844

Languages
  - Official: Hindi
- Time zone: UTC+5:30 (IST)
- PIN: 341306
- Telephone code: 01581-0222006
- Vehicle registration: RJ-37

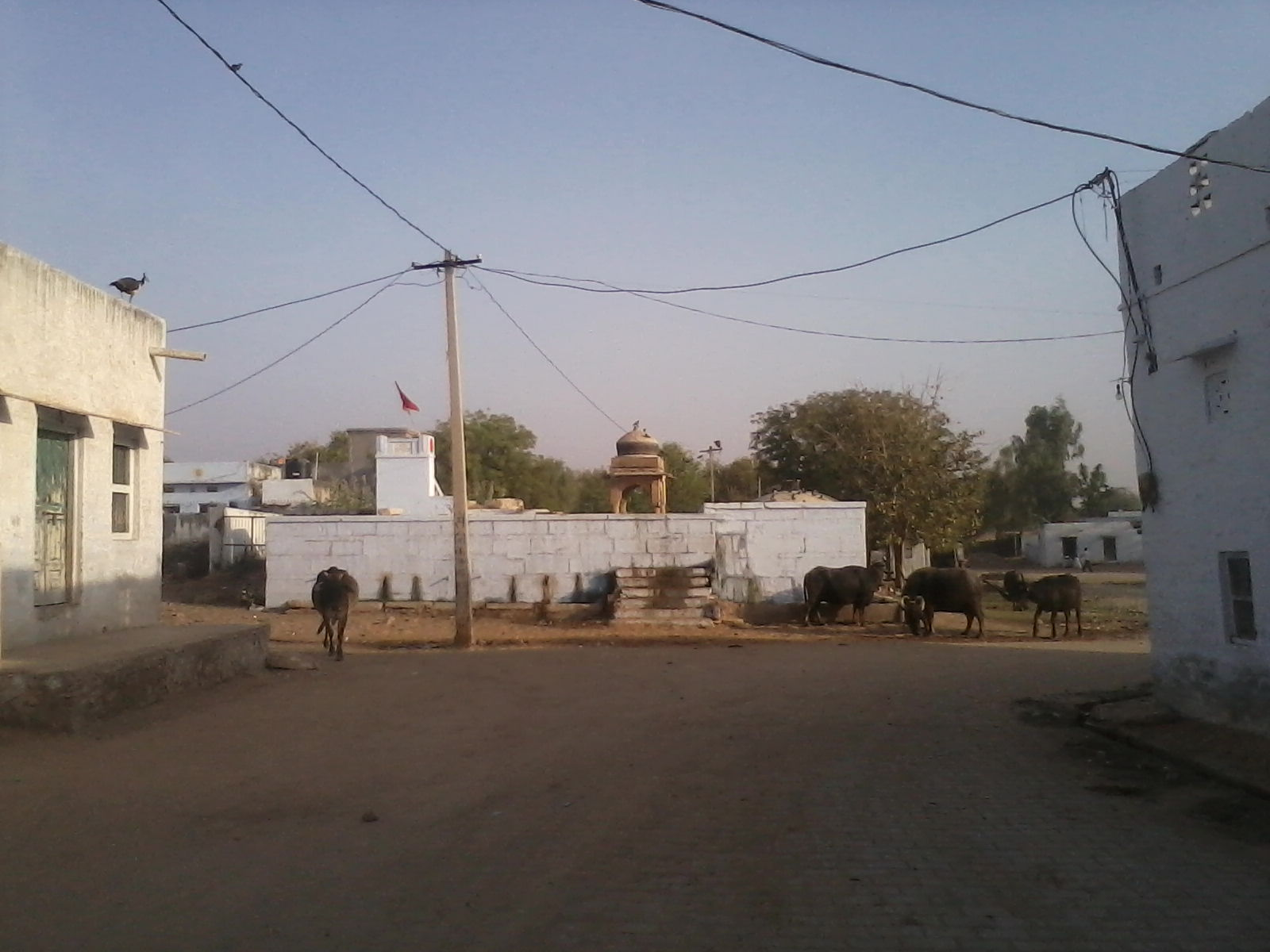
Well at Sunari's historical foundation site.

Sunari is a village in Ladnun tehsil (I sector), Nagaur district, Rajasthan, north west India. Its lok sabha (lower house region of governance) is Nagaur constituency. The residents, numbering between five and six thousand, are Hindu. Sunari lies on the edge of the Thar (Great Indian) Desert.

== Location ==
Sunari village is located in north west India, in Rajasthan state on the edge of the Thar Desert. The nearest service centres are Ladnun, 12 km to the east and Sujangarh 20 km to the north east. The nearest cities are Jaipur, 100 km to the south and Nagaur 82 km away on the Ladnun road. Sariska National Park is located in the distant mountains to the east.

== History ==
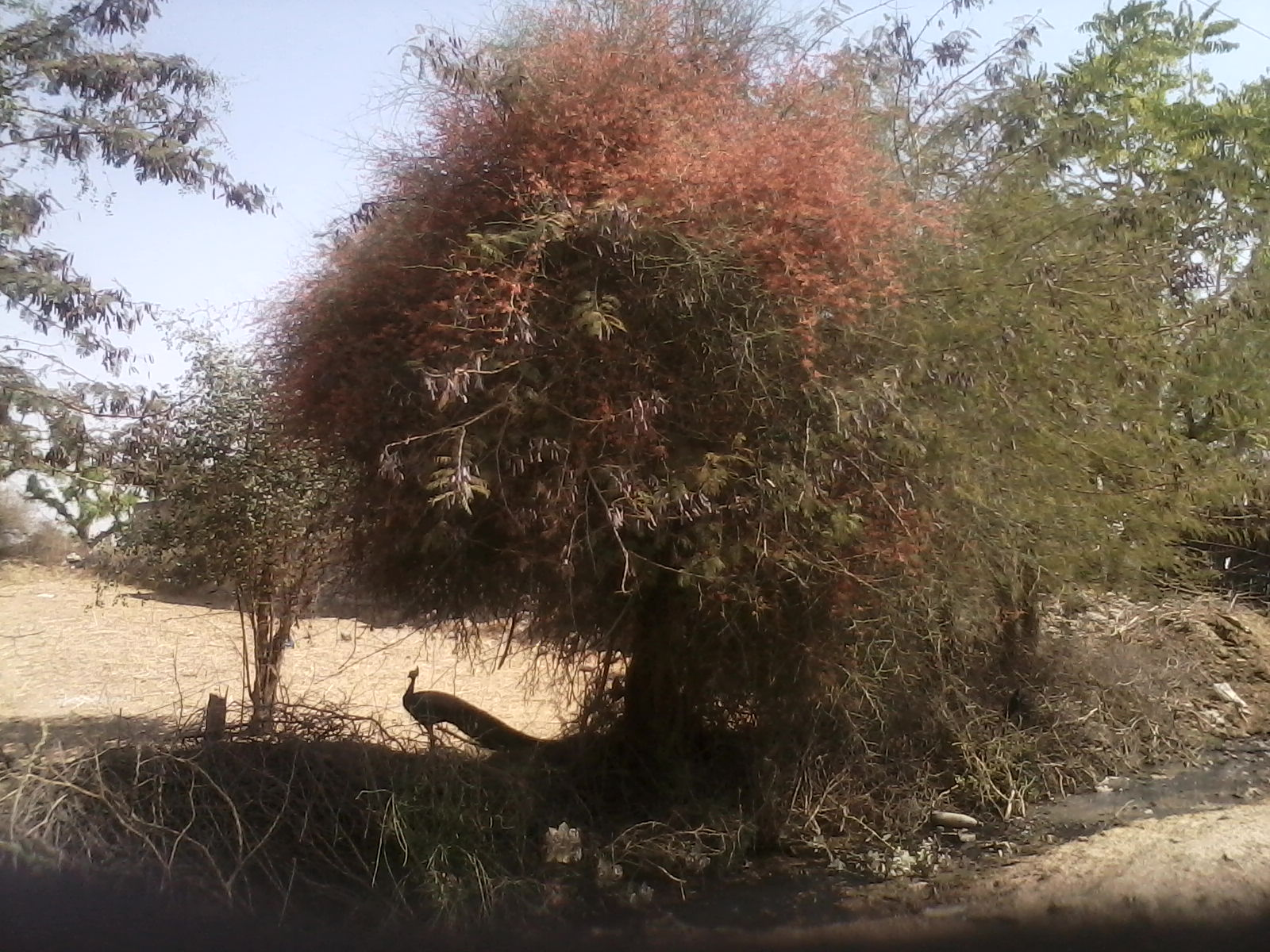
Blossoming ker bush

=== Legend ===
Marwar region (Maru mandal, Marudhara, Maruwad, Maru Desh or Marwad) was once a sea called Drumkulya. When the Lord Rama fired a flaming arrow into the ground, a large part of the sea became a desert.

=== Origin ===
Sunari village was founded by the Birda clan of the Jat community in the 13th century. Four brothers from nearby Bainatha village insulted the son of Thakur who misbehaved with the sister of the Birda boys and cut off the water used to keep their cattle. The Birda family left Bainatha village in search of a new home.

When they came to the Marwar region, they saw a soun chidi, a long-tailed shrike in a Khejri tree on left side of the path. Tradition held that on seeing a shrike, on the left, the journey should stop. So, they made camp there for the night. At dawn, one of the brothers saw a sheep in the ker struggling to protect her new born lamb from a pack of three jackals. The family was so moved by the struggle of the sheep that they decided make that place their new settlement. Initially, the settlement was called Sugnawali after the soun chidi. Gradually, Sugnawali became Sunari.

== Geography ==
Sunari rests at the boundary between semi-arid agricultural land and the Thar Desert.

=== Water ===
Water sources in Sunari are tube wells to a depth of up to 600 feet (180 m) and local precipitation into four large ponds: Nadiya, Chhapli, Kacholiya and Urlai. Canals supplement ground water irrigation.

=== Climate ===
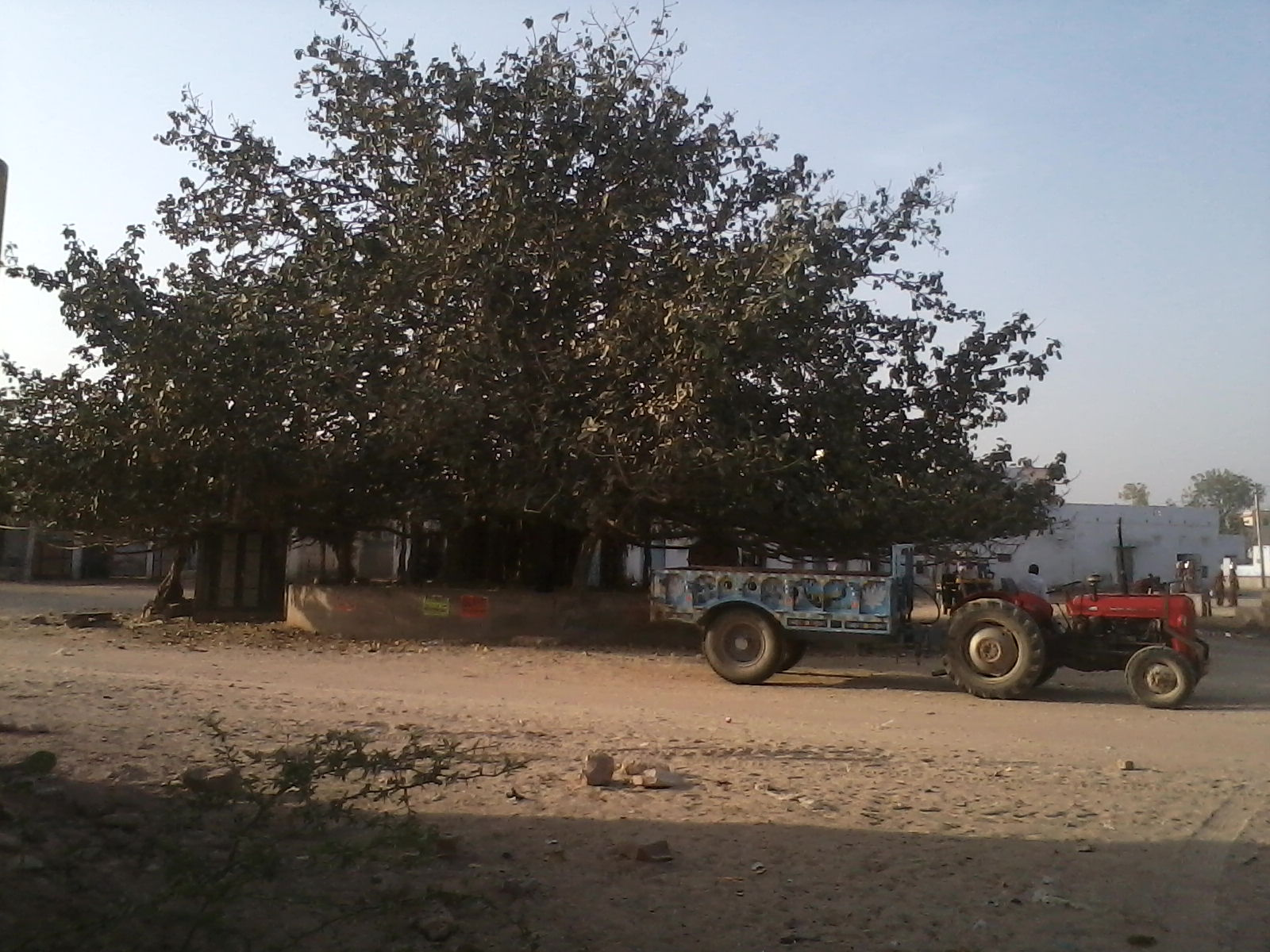
A banyan tree provides shade in Sunari

The climate of Sunari is characterised by its dryness and extremes of temperature. It has very hot summers and cool winters. Summer starts in April and lasts until mid-October. May is the hottest month, with the maximum temperatures to 48 °C. The Loo, the hot winds, blow from May to July. Dust storms are common. The summer monsoon from late June to September is weak. Average yearly precipitation is 15 inches (380 mm). The mild, mostly sunny winter begins in November. Freezing temperatures may be reached at night.

=== Baas ===
The village is divided into ten baas (localities):

- Kuve wala
- Shankhala
- Unchala (upper)
- Godara
- Mandir walo
- Aathuna
- Ratda
- meghwalon ka baas
- Nadiay
- Bawari

=== Transport ===
Sunari lies on national highway 65 from Nagaur to Ladnun.

== Administration ==
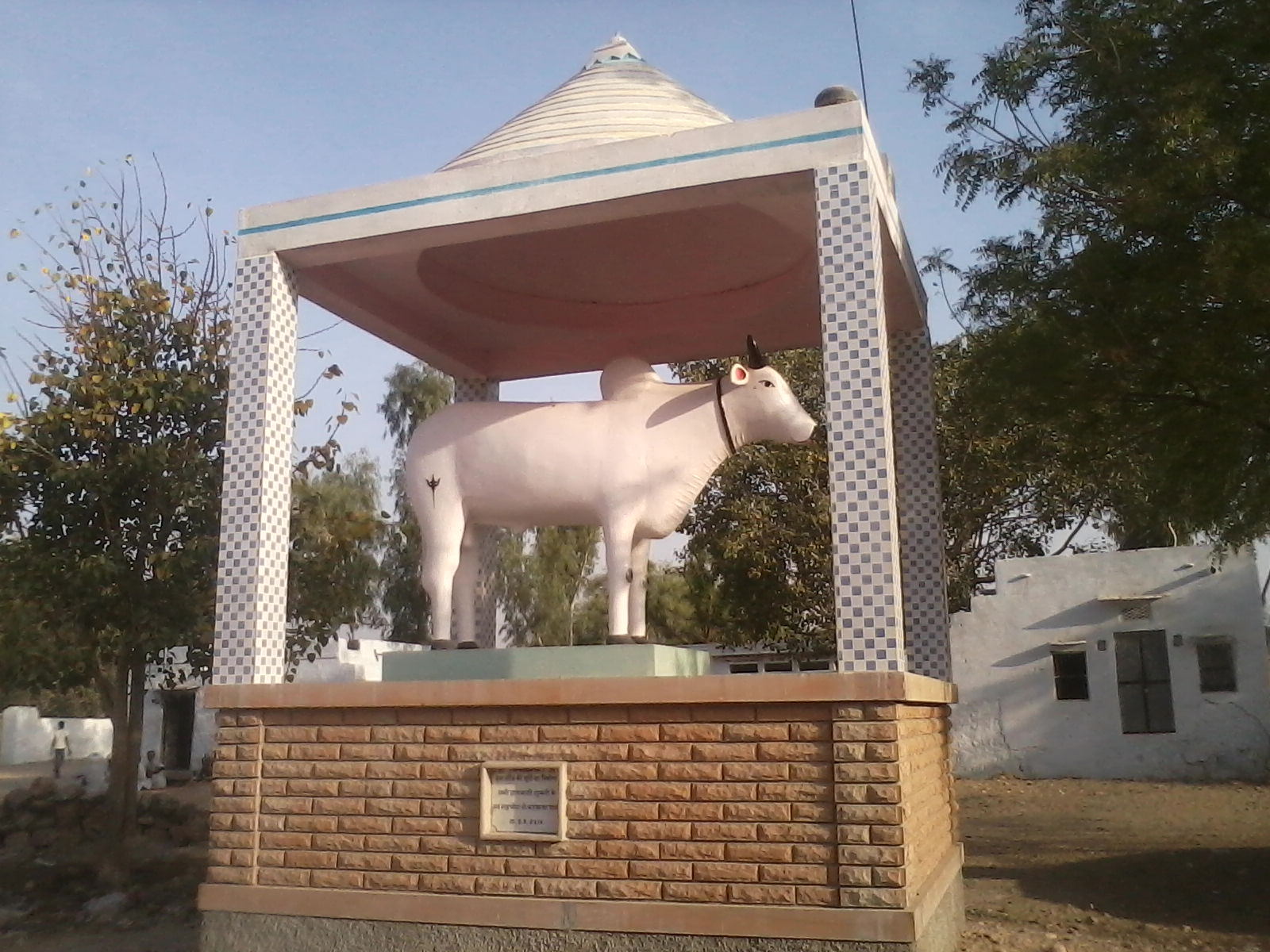
Bull memorial

Local government in Sunari is by its democratically elected panchayat samiti (council) under a Gram Panchayat village code. Sunari's middle level of governance has varied. Sunari has been assigned to Ladnun Tehsil or to Ladnun Vidhan Sabha constituency in Nagaur district, or to the "no reserve for candidates" of Vidhan Sabha constituency in Ladnun. For example, Sunari has been governed by Nagaur Zilla panchayat, Ladnun-I Intermediate panchayat.

Sunari has a patwari (a government land record officer); an agricultural development officer (ADO).; a rural health officer (RHO); and, an Anganbadi worker.

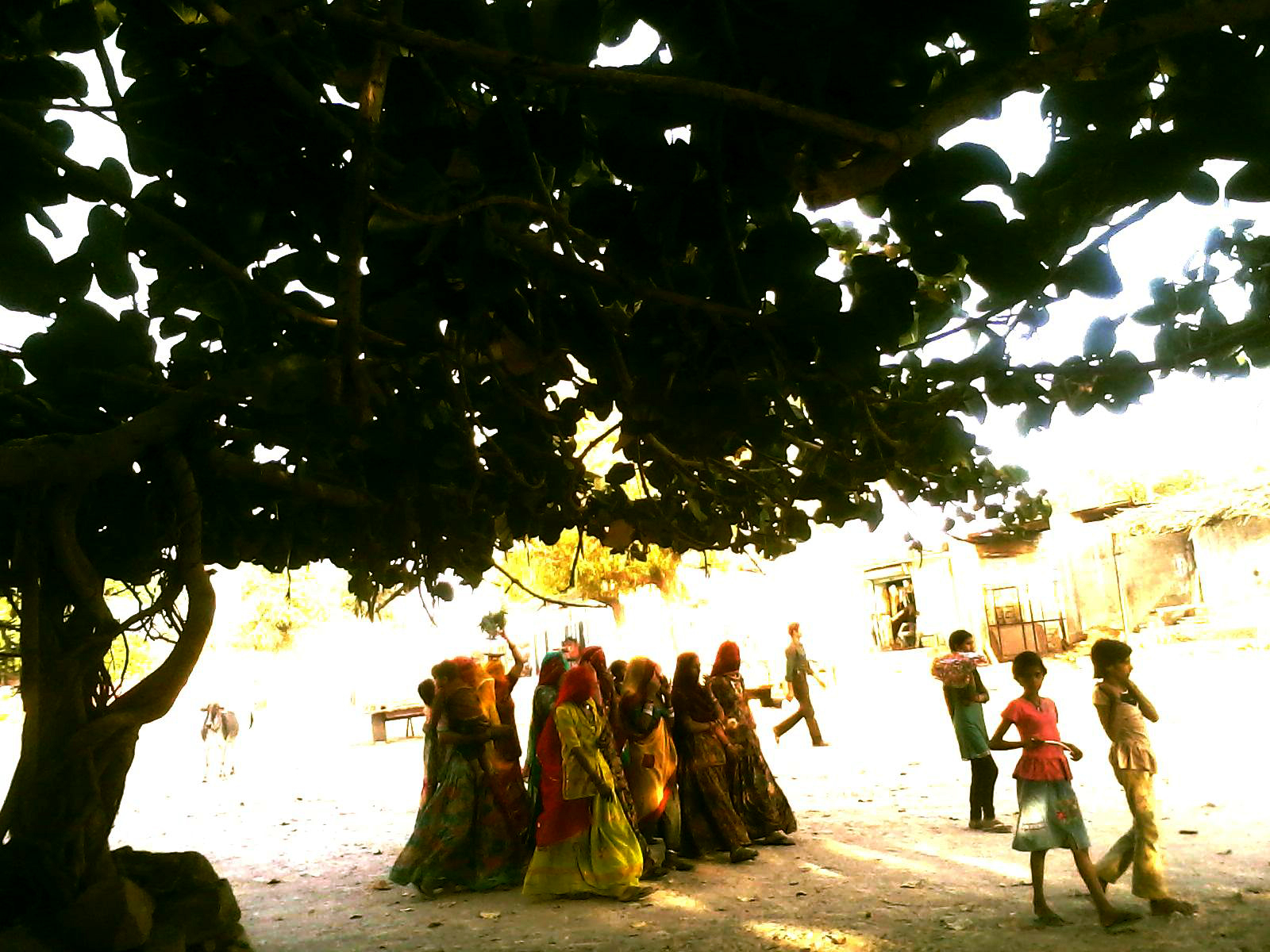
Jalawaa Pujan, the well worshiping ceremony.

== Demographics ==
In 2001, Sunari had 896 households and a population of 5,119. There were 2,712 males and 2,407 females. Children under six years numbered 835. Fifty-one percent of the population were literate. Sixty-five percent of literate people were men and thirty-five percent of literate people were women. The literacy rate for women was thirty-eight percent.

In July 2010, Sunari had 1,147 households and a population of 5,733 with 1,196 Scheduled Caste inhabitants. The inhabitants are Hindus of the Jats clan belonging to a variety of Hindu castes.

Sunari is covered by the Mahatma Gandhi National Rural Employment Guarantee Act. In July 2010, 135 job cards were issued.

== Education ==
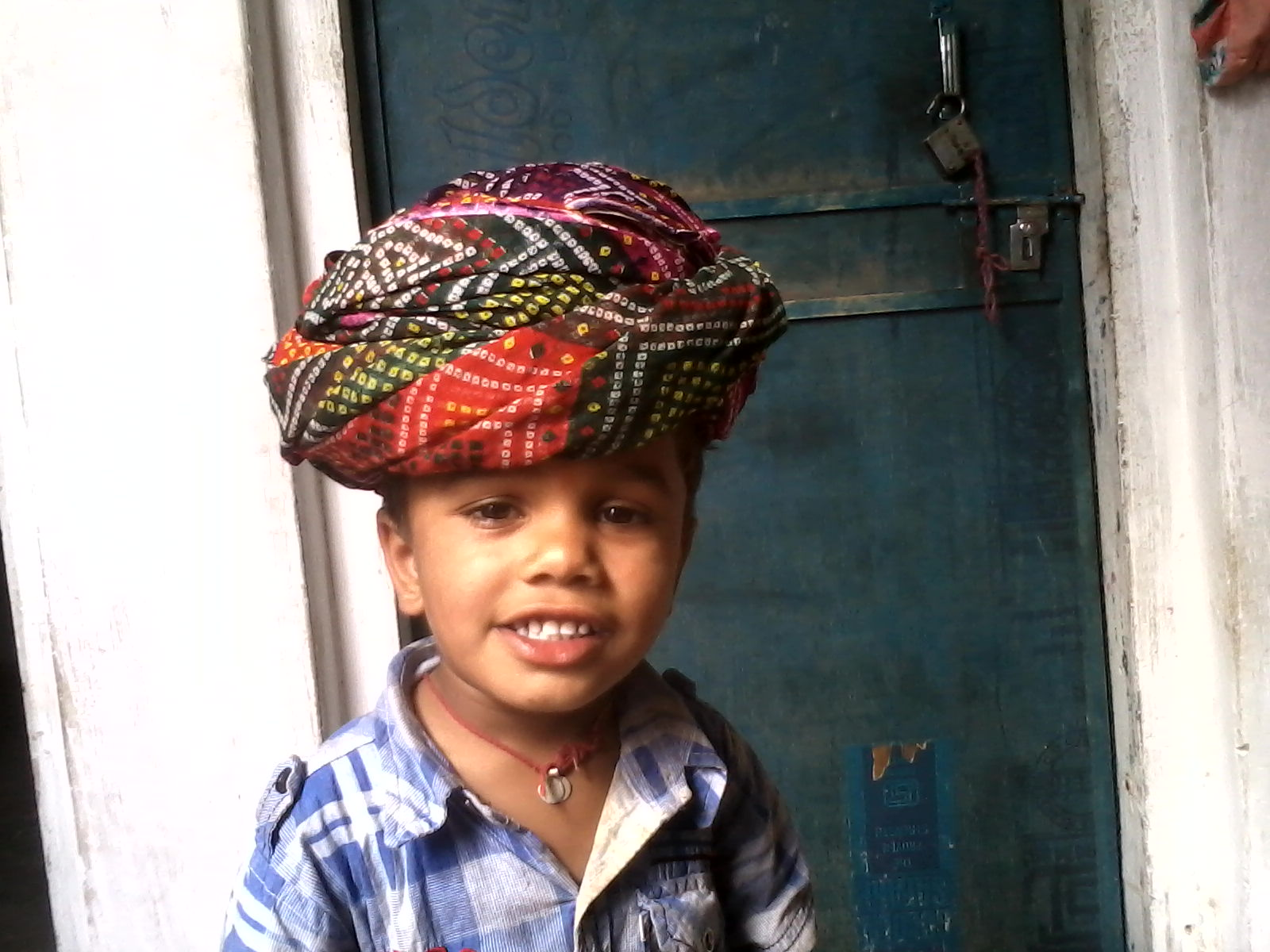
Child in traditional Chundadi turban.

Sunari's schools include two government run schools and two Rajeev Gandhi primary schools funded in the private sector.

- Government primary school.
- Government senior secondary school.
- Rajeev Gandhi primary school, Kacholiya.
- Rajeev Gandhi primary school, Urlai.
- Sharda Bal Vidyamandir secondary school.
- Veer Teja middle school.
- Gyani Ram Harakh Chand P.G. government degree college, Sujala Point (17 km from Sunari)
- Tapadiya ITI College (15 km from Sunari).

== Visitor destinations ==
Sunari hosts ten temples. The Thakur Ji temple was built in the 18th century. It is dedicated to Lord Krishna. Others include: the Baba Hariram temple; Khatu Shyam temple; Hanuman Ji temple; Dadhimati Mata temple; Baba Ramdev temple; Veer Tejaji temple; and the Jahar Veer Goga temple.

== See also ==
- "Sunari." Our Village India organisation.
- "Ramsa Pir" Rainywall.
