= Rampura, Nagaur =

Village in Rajasthan, India

Rampura
- Village
- Location in Rajasthan, India Rampura (India)
- Coordinates: 27.14°N 74.51°E
- Country: India
- State: Rajasthan
- District: Nagaur
- Elevation: 486 m (1,594 ft)

Population (2001)
  - Total: 7,000

Languages
  - Official: Hindi
- Time zone: UTC+5:30 (IST)
- PIN: 341508
- Telephone code: 01586
- ISO 3166 code: IN-RJ

Rampura is a village located in the Nagaur district of Rajasthan state, India.

== Overview ==
Located 15 kilometres (9.3 mi) from Kuchaman City, Rampura is serviced by Kuchaman's Narayanpura railway station and Jaipur International Airport. The village's population is Hindu and the native language is Hindi, though Marwari is also used. Monsoon season takes place in June and July and the annual rainfall is approximately 418 millimetres (16.5 in). The hottest month of the year is June, with a maximum temperature of 44 °C (111 °F), and the coldest month is January, with a mimimum temperature of 1 °C (34 °F).
