= Bader, Rajasthan =

Bader
- Village
- Location in Rajasthan, India
- Coordinates: 27.5441°N 74.4330°E
- Country: India
- State: Rajasthan
- District: Nagaur
- Elevation: 3,200 m (10,500 ft)

Population (2011)
  - Total: 1,617
- Time zone: UTC+5:30 (IST)
- PIN: 341306
- Telephone code: 01581
- Vehicle registration: RJ-37

Bader is a village in Ladnun Tehsil in Nagaur district of Rajasthan, India. It comes under Bakliya Panchayat. It is 90 km east of the district headquarters in Nagaur, 11 km from Ladnu and 179 km from the state capital, Jaipur. Ladnu, Didwana, Sujangarh are the nearby Cities to Bader. Bader has multiple temples of Veer Tejaji, Bheruji Temple.

== Location ==
Bader Village is situated Between Ladnun and Didwana Road. 11 km From ladnun in south and 22 km From Didwana in north.
