= Jaswantgarh =

Coordinates: 27°39′08″N 74°27′33″E

Jaswantgarh is a small town in Nagaur district, Rajasthan, India, situated about 210 km from Jaipur and around 30 km from Salasar. It is in between Ladnun and Sujangarh on National Highway 65.
