= Salasar Balaji Temple =

Hindu Temple in Rajasthan, India

Salasar Balaji
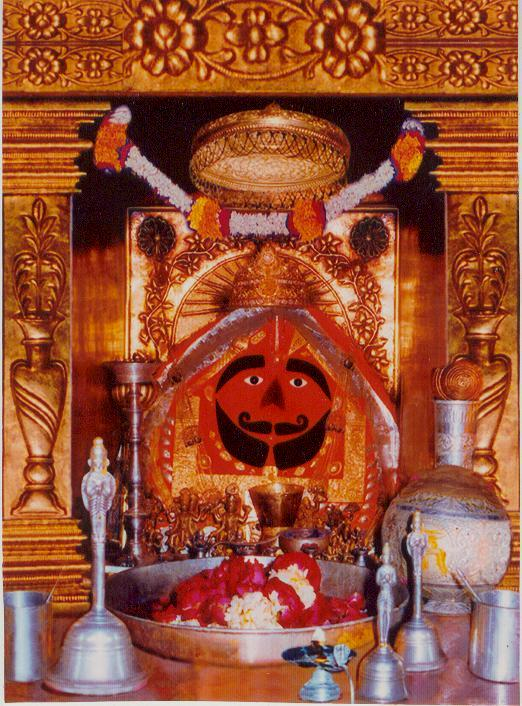
- Idol of Lord Hanuman in the temple

- Salasar Balaji Temple Location in Rajasthan

Religion
- Affiliation: Hinduism
- District: Churu
- Deity: Hanuman

Location
- Location: Salasar
- State: Rajasthan
- Country: India
- Interactive map of Salasar Balaji
- Coordinates: 27.72°N 74.71°E

Website
- shreesalasarbalajimandir.com

Salasar Balaji Temple is a Hindu temple for the devotees of Hindu god Hanuman. It is located in the town of Salasar near Sujangarh, in Churu district of Rajasthan, India. The Hanuman Temple is situated right in the heart of Salasar town. Every year two big fairs are organized during the months of Chaitra (March–April) and Ashwin (September - October).

== Location ==
Salasar is near Sujangarh, Rajasthan. It is located on the Jaipur-Bikaner highway.

== History ==
The story is prevalent in the context of this temple. According to local legend, a long time ago in the village of Asota, Rajasthan, a Ginthala farmer's plough collided with an object while ploughing and stopped. When the farmer looked, he saw a stone. The farmer started digging and found an idol of Balaji or Hanuman. At the same time, the farmer's wife came to the fields with lunch for the farmer. In his lunch, his wife had made Churma of Bajra. The farmer offered the Churma to Shree Balaji Maharaj. From that time until now, it has been a ritual to offer Churma to Shree Balaji Maharaj. The day was Tuesday, and it was Navami (the 9th day) of the Shravan month (July–August) in the bright half (first fortnight). The farmer told the people about this incident.

It is said that the landlord in that place also had a dream on the same day. In the dream, Lord Hanuman ordered the landlord to install the idol in a Mandir in Salasar. On that same night, another person named Mohandas, a resident of Salasar, was also instructed by Lord Hanuman in a dream to establish his presence by taking the idol from Asota to Salasar.

== See also ==
- Mehandipur Balaji Temple
