= Parbatsar =

Parbatsar (Parvatsar)
- Town
- Nickname: PBC
- Location in Rajasthan, India Parbatsar (Parvatsar) (India)
- Coordinates: 26.53°N 74.46°E
- Country: India
- State: Rajasthan
- District: Didwana Kuchaman
- Founder: Dahiya's of SINHADIYA (old name was Derawargarh)
- Named for: Parbatshah Zawar

Government
  - Type: Municipality
  - Body: Legislative Assembly of Rajasthan

Population (2011)
  - Total: 15,172

Languages
  - Official: Hindi
- Time zone: UTC+5:30 (IST)
- PIN: 341512

Parbatsar is a town and a municipality in Didwana Kuchaman District in the Indian state of Rajasthan. The SDM of Parbatsar is Balbir Singh Meel and the MLA is Ramniwas Gawriya.

Presently Parbatsar is located in Didwana Kuchaman District after making new districts by government of Rajasthan. Previously it was in Nagour.

== Demographics ==
As of 2011, Parbatsar had a population of 225413 of which 114898 are males and 110515 are females.
