= Nawa, Rajasthan =

Nawa City, Rajasthan Nawa Salt City
- City
- Nickname: Salt City
- Location in Rajasthan, India Nawa City, Rajasthan (India)
- Coordinates: 27.02°N 75.0°E
- Country: India
- State: Rajasthan
- District: Didwana Kuchaman
- Founder: Amir Pindari
- Elevation: 369 m (1,211 ft)

Population (2011)
  - Total: 22,088

Languages
  - Official: Hindi
- Time zone: UTC+5:30 (IST)
- PIN: 341509
- ISO 3166 code: RJ-IN
- Vehicle registration: RJ 37-
- Nearest city: Jaipur, Ajmer, Sikar Govindi
- Lok Sabha constituency: Nagaur (Hanuman Beniwal RLTP)
- Vidhan Sabha constituency: Nawa (Vijay Singh Choudhary BJP)

Nawa is a city, tehsil headquarters, panchayat samiti, and a municipality in Didwana Kuchaman District in the Indian state of Rajasthan. It is the Biggest Salt Market of Rajasthan.

== Geography ==
Nawa (Nawan) is located at 27.02°N 75.0°E. It has an average elevation of 369 metres (1210 feet). The Nawa City is located at the border of three major district of Rajasthan Jaipur, Ajmer, Sikar. In North of city Arawali mountain's part and in south The Sambhar Lake, In East of town the Turatmati river and in West also Arawali Mountains.

== Demographics ==
As of 2011 India census, Nawa had a population of 22,088. Males constitute 53% of the population and females 47%. Nawa has an average literacy rate of 65%, higher than the national average of 59.5%: male literacy is 73%, and female literacy is 56%. In Nawa, 16% of the population is under 6 years of age.

== Thakurs ==
The area was granted to Rao Bharmalla Singh, fourth son of Rao Prithviraj Singh II of Sikar, who received it in 1496 AD.

1. Rao Bharmalla Singh (1496–1530)
2. Rao Amar Singh (1530–1568)
3. Rao Teja Singh (1568–1597)
4. Rao Sheo Singh (1597–1638)
5. Thakur Rao Dhai Singh (1638–1662)
6. Thakur Nawab Sawai Khan Kayamkhani (1662–1694)
7. Thakur Nawab Bhanwar Khan Kayamkhani (1694–1727)
8. Thakur Nawab Dilawar Khan Kayamkhani (1727–1764)

== Sightseeing and shrines ==
- Public Park
- Shri Balaji mandir(Main Market)
- Zama Masjid (Imam chowk)
- Madina Masjid (Luhar Mohalla)
- Akbari Masjid (Mohanpura Road)
- Digamber Jain temple(Main market)
- Dargah Aasiq Ali Peer Baba
- Dargah Mustaq Ali Baba
- Dargah Kuncha Wale Peer Baba
- Alam Seth mandir
- Shree Jaal ke Balaji mandir
- Shree Bhiwra nada Balaji temple
- Shree Shanidev temple
- Shree Station Nada mandir
- Shakhmbri Devi temple
- Shree Radhe Krishna temple (Azad chowk)
- Radhe Krishna temple (Aasan Jogiyan)
- Shri Neminath Digamber Jain Temple (Pipali bazaar)
- Shri Suparasnath Digamber Jain Temple Pipali bazar
- Shri Pipali wale Balaji (dakidara mohalla)
- Shri Banke Bihari Temple
- Shri Siddhi Vinayak Temple

== Schools ==
A number of schools are located in Nawa:

- Wisdom Public School, Nawa city
- Shree Shyam Bal Niketan Sr Sec School, Nawa City
- Rajasthali Vidyapeeth Sr Sec School, Nawa city
- RVS Academy, Nawa city
- Sharada Bal Niketan Sr Sec School Nawa city
- Vivekanand Sr Sec School Nawa city
- Govt Sr Sec School, Nawa
- Govt Girls Sr Sec School, Nawa
- Good Shepherd English school, Nawa City
- Adarsh Vidhya Mandir, NAWA CITY
- BAL VIDHYA MANDIR SCHOOL English medium school, Nawa city
- Jems Academy Best English medium school
- Bachpan Play School (Best english med school)

== Social groups ==
- SHIKSHA Ek Pehal Ek Paryas NGO
- Shree Aashu Lal Vyas Sewa Samiti
- Friends Club
- Shaheed Bhagat Singh Social Group
- Nawa Social Services Society
- Yuva Muslim Mahasabha
- Shubhash Sewa Samiti
- Veer Bajrangi Sewa Samiti
- Lion's club

== Colleges ==
- Government College, Nawa City
- S.B.S.P.G. College, Nawa City
- S.B.S. College of Nursing, Nawa City
- S.B.S. Teacher Training College, Nawa City
- Govt ITI College, Nawa City
- Govt agriculture college, Nawa City
- Govt polytechnic college, Nawa City
- Govt veterinary college, Nawa City
- Govt Law college, Nawa City
- Pr Mamorial collage Nawa Ciay

== Politics ==
Freedom Fighter Kishan Lal Shah was the first MLA in 1952–57 and was re-elected for second term in 1957–62 and fourth Assembly 1967–72. Hanuman Singh Choudhary was elected for Third Assembly in 1962–67 and later on shri Rameshwar Lal Choudhary, Harish Chandra Kumawat in 1985-1990, 1990-1992, 1998-2003a and 2003-2008. Mahendra Chaudhary and Vijay Singh Choudhary and represented the constituency.

== City officials ==
- MLA - Mahendra Chaudhary
- SDM - Anshul Singh
- Tehsildar - Satish Rao
- Circle Inspector(CI) - Satish Meena
- Chairperson - Sayari Devi
- Block chief Medical officer (BCMO) - DR SAURABH JAIN

== Salt Plants (Since 1984) ==
- Arvind Salt Industries
- Manoj Salt Industries
- Laxmi Salt Works
- Bhagwati Salt Company
- Dhanlaxmi Chemfood, Nawa City
