= Didwana =

City Council in Rajasthan, India

Didwana Abhanagri
- City
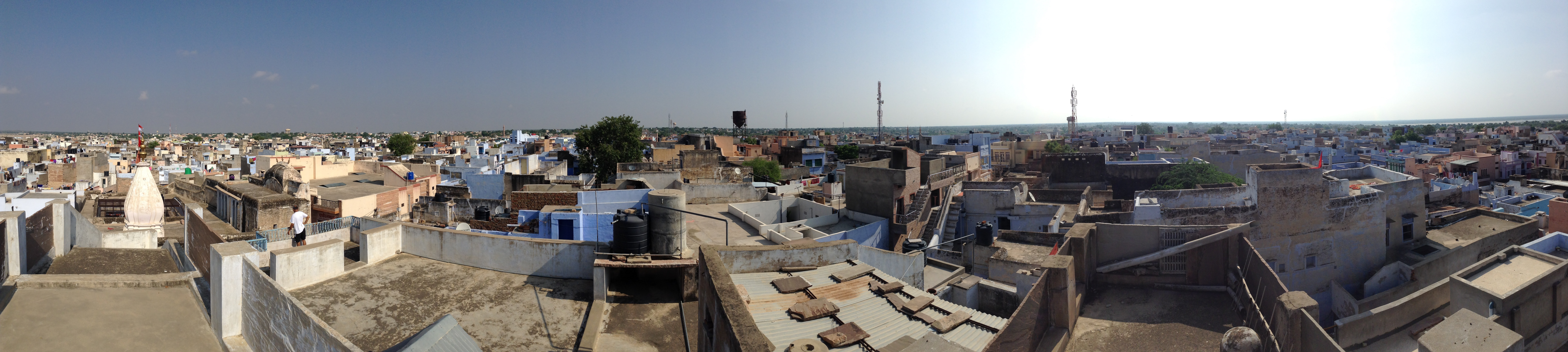
- Didwana (Rajasthan)

- Location in Rajasthan, India
- Coordinates: 27.4°N 74.57°E
- Country: India
- State: Rajasthan
- District: Didwana-Kuchaman
- Established: 12th Century AD
- Founder: Didu Shah

Government
  - Type: Constitution
  - MLA: Yunus Khan
- Elevation: 320 m (1,050 ft)

Population (2021)
  - Total: As per the 2,021 Aadhar estimates Didwana population was 492,284 (including rural and urban)

Languages
  - Official: Hindi, Rajasthani
- Time zone: UTC+5:30 (IST)
- PIN: 341303
- Telephone code: 01580
- Vehicle registration: RJ-37
- Sex ratio: 1000/1000

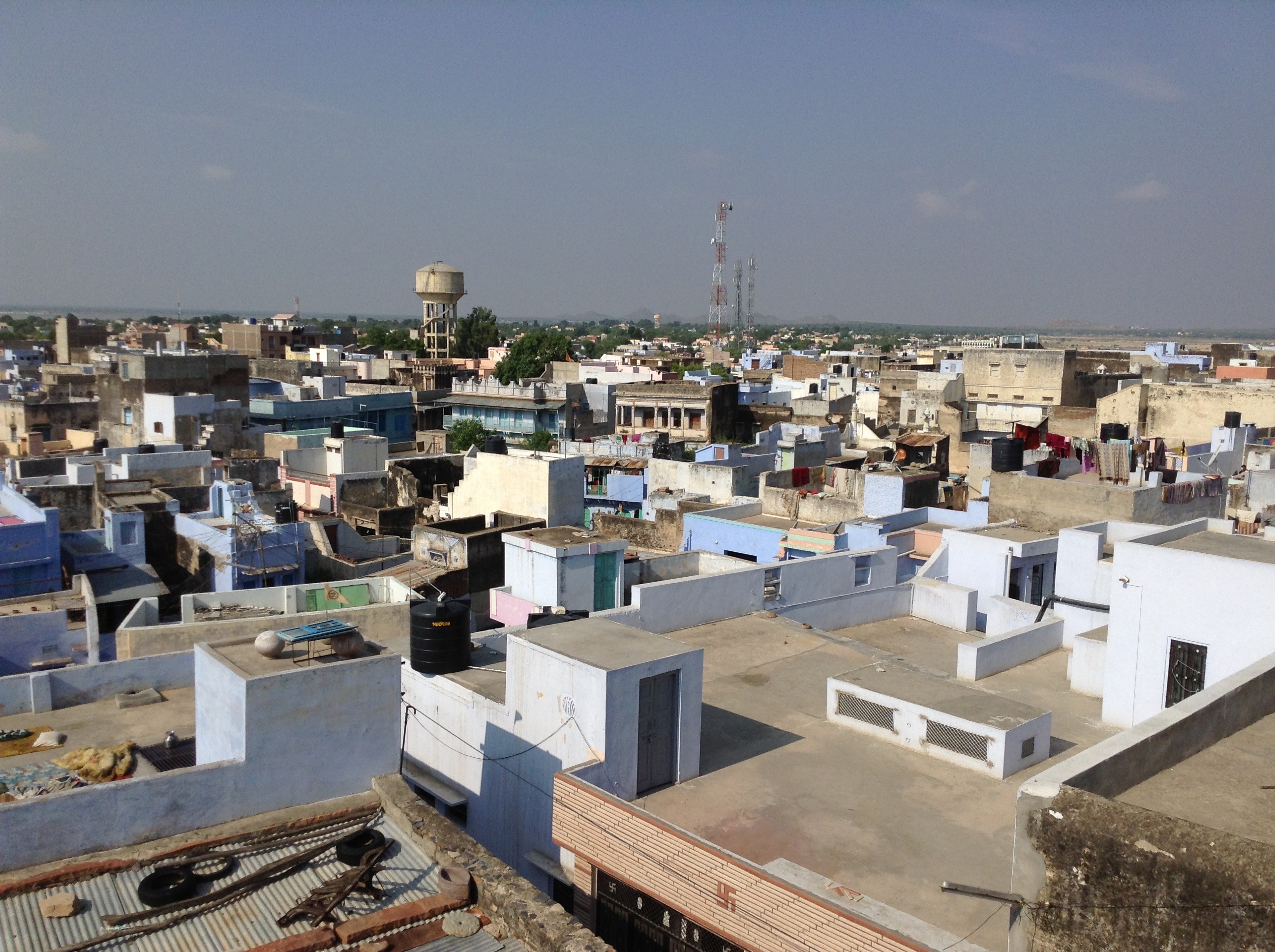
Didwana (2013)

Didwana is a city and the district headquarters of the Didwana-Kuchaman district in the Indian state of Rajasthan. It is known as "the lion gateway" of Marwar and "the archway" of Merta. It is mentioned in Puranic texts such as Abhanagri and Upakashi. It is situated on the northern side of Didwana Salt Lake and was administered as a subdistrict of Nagaur before becoming a separate district on 4 August 2023.

The people of Didwana speak Marwadi, a Rajasthani language.

== Geography ==
The city is divided into 40 wards which are Governed by Nagar Parishad Didwana.

== Transport ==
Didwana is an important station on the Jodhpur-Delhi Broad gauge rail route of the North West Railway Jodhpur division

== Demographics ==
As of 2021, Didwana's population was 492,284. Literate people numbered 226,426, of whom 139,916 were male and 86,510 were female. Total workers were 155,998 out of whom 97,012 were men and 58,986 were women. 43,918 cultivators worked there including14,641 women. Male literacy was 70% and female literacy was 54%. 17% of the population were under 6 years of age.

== Archaeological importance ==
In the Didwana region of Rajasthan, hand axes were discovered that resembled those in the Shiwalik Range. These date to around 400,000 years ago. Analysis of desert soil layers and other evidence uncovered a link between the prevailing climate and the technological progressions observed in the Paleolithic period.

Didwana preserved Lower Paleolithic artifacts in both primary and semi-primary contexts. Through geological stratigraphy of aeolian and playa sediments, hand axes found in stratified contexts have been dated to the Middle Pleistocene. To understand the technological evolution of the Acheulian culture in this area, 301 hand axes from 10 locations were studied using Roe's methodology, supplemented with additional attributes. Variations in size, shape, and refinement were noted among the collections. Statistical analyses, diagrams, factor assessments, and cluster analyses indicated a technological evolution within the assemblages, helping to establish the chronology. These hand axes may align with cultural stages ranging from early Acheulian to very late Acheulian or even early Middle Paleolithic.
