= Didwana-Kuchaman district =

Didwana–Kuchaman district
- District of Rajasthan
- Location of Didwana Kuchaman district in Rajasthan
- Country: India
- State: Rajasthan
- Division: Ajmer
- Established: August 2023
- Headquarters: Didwana

Government
  - Type: Democracy
  - Body: Government of Rajasthan
  - District Collector & Magistrate: Avdhesh Meena, IAS
  - Superintendent of Police: Richa Tomar, IPS
- Website: Deedwana-Kuchaman District

Didwana-Kuchaman district is a district in the Indian state of Rajasthan. Didwana city serving as the district headquarters.

The district was established on 7 August 2023.

== Demographics ==
Religions in Didwana Kuchaman district (2011)
Religion	Percent
Hinduism	82.82%
Islam	16.52%
Jainism	0.44%
Other or not stated	0.22%

At the time of the 2011 census, Didwana-Kuchaman district had a population of 1,625,837. Didwana-Kuchaman district had a sex ratio of 954 females per 1000 males. 359,823 (22.13%) lived in urban areas. Scheduled Castes and Scheduled Tribes made up 326,713 (20.10%) and 6,798 (0.42%) of the population respectively.

Hindus are the majority religion. Muslims mainly live in urban areas and are in majority in several towns such as Makrana.

Languages of Didwana Kuchaman district (2011)
1. Rajasthani (77.7%)
2. Marwari (17.5%)
3. Urdu (2.40%)
4. Hindi (2.20%)
5. Others (0.22%)

At the time of the 2011 census, 77.70% of the population spoke Rajasthani, 17.48% Marwari, 2.40% Urdu and 2.20% Hindi as their first language.

Total population of district as per the 2011 Census of India is as follows:

Population As per Census 2011<(only 5 Tehsils Makrana, Parbatsar, Nawa, Didwana and Ladnu was present during census)
Sl No	Sub Division	Total Population	Male Population	Female Population
1	Makrana	345,569	177,715	167,884
2	Didwana	397,003	202,303	194,700
3	Nawa	404,910	208,912	195,998
4	Parbatsar	225,413	114,898	110,515
5	Ladnun	252,942	128,390	124,552
Total		1,625,837	832,218	793,649

== Tehsils ==
Presently Tehsils are as follows:

Sl No	Sub Division	Tehsil	
1	Makrana	1	Makrana
2	Didwana	2	Didwana
		3	Maulasar
		4	Chhoti Khatu
3	Nawa	5	Nawa
4	Parbatsar	6	Parbatsar
5	Ladnun	7	Ladnun
6	Kuchaman City	8	Kuchaman City
