= Kunjal Mata Temple =

- Location in Rajasthan Kunjal Mata Temple (India)

Religion
- Affiliation: Hinduism

Location
- Location: Deh, Nagaur
- State: Rajasthan
- Country: India
- Interactive map of Kunjal Mata Temple
- Coordinates: 27°18′33″N 73°54′58″E

Kunjal Mata Temple of goddess Kunjal is located in Deh village of Jayal tehsil in Nagaur district of Rajasthan, India, and 1.3 km (1 mi) away from Deh's Bus Station on Nagaur-Ladnun National Highway-65.

Kunjal Mata is kul devi of Pareek Brahmin's (Joshi, Kanthadia, Sakraniya and many other Pareek gotras).

Temple area is 38 Bigha.

It is A Historical Place of Rajasthan.
