= Rol Nagaur =

Rol
- Village
- Location within Rajasthan Location within India
- Coordinates: 27.1667°N 73.9333°E
- Country: India
- State: Rajasthan
- District: Nagaur
- Settled: 500 Years ago

Government
  - Type: Gram panchayat
  - Sarpanch: Manphool Singh Didel
- Elevation: 318 m (1,043 ft)

Population (2011)
  - Total: 7,359
- Time zone: UTC+5:30 (IST)
- Pincode(s): 341027
- Area code: 911583
- ISO 3166 code: RJ-IN
- Vehicle registration: RJ-21
- Spoken languages: Hindi, Marwadi,

Rol is a village in Jayal tehsil of Nagaur district in the Indian state of Rajasthan.

== Location ==
Rol is situated at a distance of 21 km from Nagaur in the east direction on Nagaur-Didwana state highway no.- 19 .

== History ==
Rol was founded about 500 years ago. It was Muslim dominated at that time. There is a big dargah in the village. Muslims organize a fair every year (According to Hindi month Kartik krishn dvitiya). The book Arabic, Persian and Urdu Inscriptions of West India by Dr. Ziyaud-Din Abdul-Hayy Desai provides a comprehensive list of more than 2,000 inscriptions from West Indian states. At S.No. 249, mentions as Rohal Sharif which is same as present Rol in Nagaur district.

== Occupation ==
The main occupations people have are in agriculture and government/private jobs. Some villagers are employed in government services and many people are doing BIG Business and private jobs in other states i.e. Assam, Andhra pradesh, Maharashtra. Seth Ghanshyamdasji Pusaramji Inani of Latur constructed a Govt. Higher Secondary School at ROL which was inaugurated by the then Chief Minister Sri Harideo Joshi.

Rukminidevi Inani Girls Govt. Primary school & Nathi Bai Ramprasadji Inani Govt. Girls High School are other institutions endowed by INANI family in ROL . H.R. Inani family hailing from ROL got constructed a Dharmashala at Prithvi Raj Marg, Ajmer somewhere in 1923 AD.and presently known as Ramsukh Balmukund Inani ROL walon ki Dharmashala.

== Transport ==
Rol is connected to nearby villages through the railway line nearly station is Marwar Mundwa (MDW), equal about 16.5 Km and Nagaur ( NGO ) equal about 22.5 Km.

Division: Jodhpur Railway Division

Zone: North Western Railway

Road network with presence of State Transport Service and Private Bus Services which link it to Nagaur, Jaipur, Jodhpur, Didwana, Delhi, Ajmer, Bikaner, Ratanga, Mundwa, Jayal, Deh, Kuchera, Goth-Manglod.

== Mosques and Temples ==
In Rol Village Many Ramsaenhi People live & also have a temple of Shree Ranabaiji Maharaj.

The village has temples of Hanuman Mandir, Rangnath Mandir, Charbhuja Mandir, Satyanarayan Mandir, Shitla Mata Mandir, Jhawar Mandir etc. As per the inscriptions found during renovation, the Charbhuja Mandir was built by Maheshwari community of ROL village somewhere in 1281 Samvat i.e. 700 years back.

The village also has many mosques, including Shahi Jama Masjid. There is Jubba Mubarak of Muhammad, which is said to possess a holy relic brought by Qazi Hamiduddin Nagauri from Bukhara, Russia. Devotees from various parts of the country gather on urs of Quazi Sahab to celebrate the occasion. There is an annual Urs Mela (Urs Fair) organised in village.

Other mosques include -

Chille Wali Masjid, Aaisha Siddiqua Masjid, Chimpa wali Masjid, Uparlabas Masjid and Peer Pahadi.

== Geography ==
Rol is located at 27.10°N 73.55°E. It has an average elevation of 318 meters (1043 feet).

== Demographics ==
As of 2011 India Census, Rol had a population of 7359. The male population is 3799, while the female population is 3560.
