= Jhunjhala =

Junjala
- Village
- Jhunjhala
- Country: India
- State: Rajasthan
- District: Nagaur
- Tehsil: Jayal

Area
  - Total: 412.04 ha (1,018.2 acres)

Population
  - Total: 740
- Time zone: UTC+5:30 (IST)
- PIN: 341024

Junjala or Jhunjhala is a small village in Nagaur district, Rajasthan, India. Jhunjhala has a total population of 740 peoples according to Census 2011.

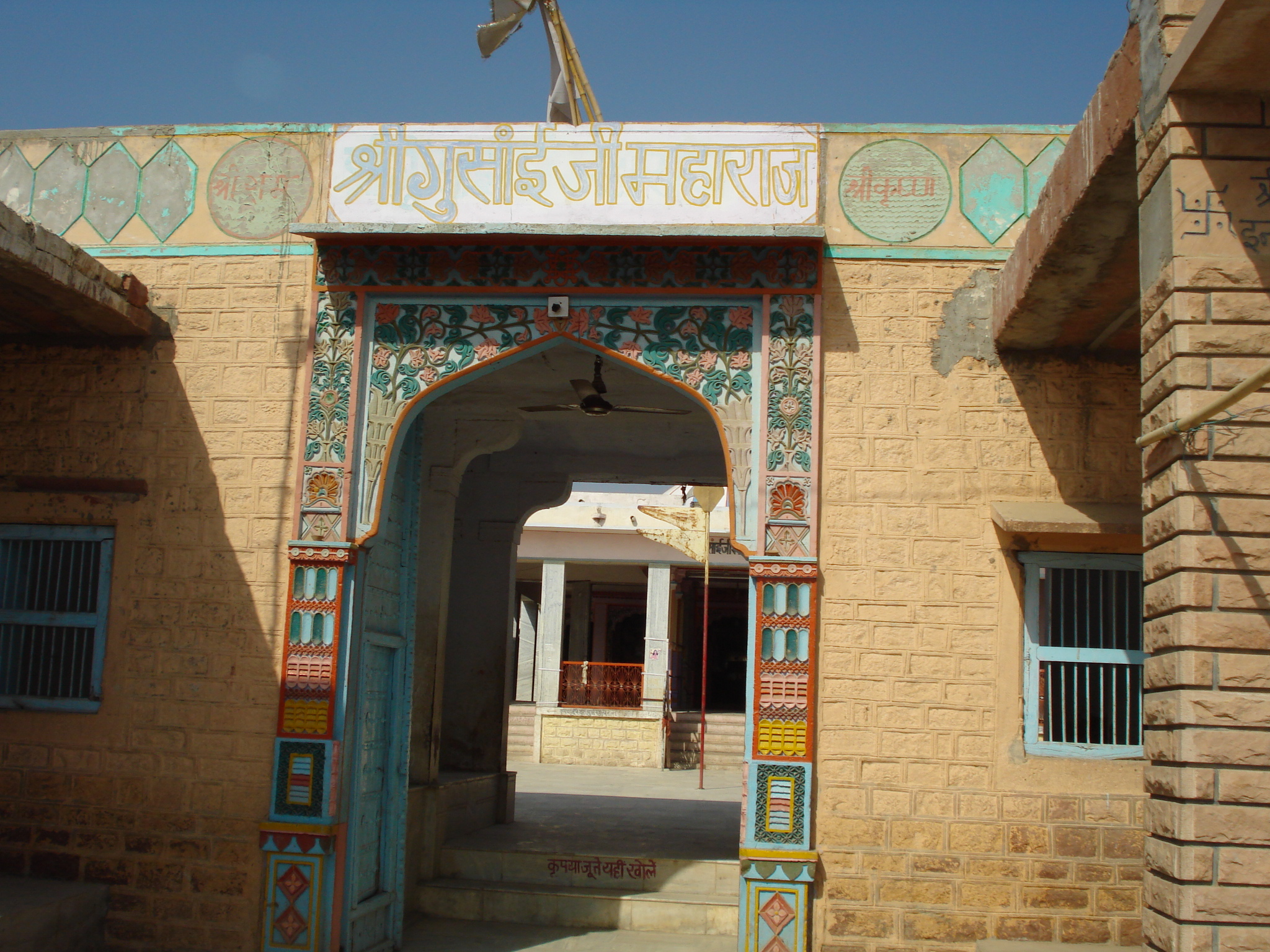
Gusain temple, Junjala

== Location ==
Junjala is located at a distance of 30 km from Nagaur in the south direction on Nagaur - Merta Road. Nearest railway station is also Mundwa or Nagaur.

== Fair ==
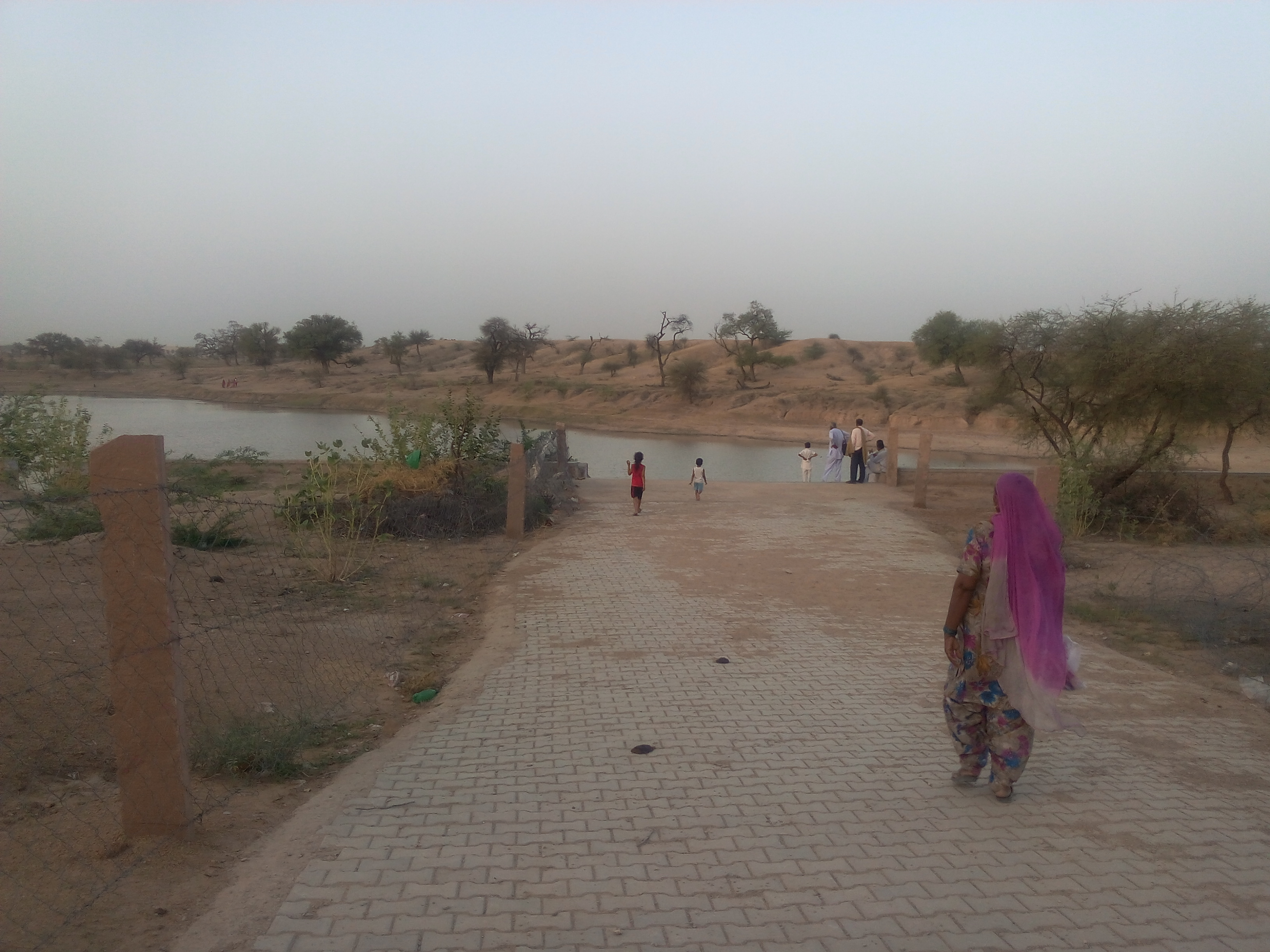
Pond at Junjala village in the west.people consider its water sacred.

Gusainji Maharaj temple is situated at village. People come from Rajasthan, Punjab, Haryana, Gujarat, Madhya Pradesh and Uttar Pradesh. Fairs are organized here twice on chaitra sudi 1-2 and Ashwin sudi 1-2.

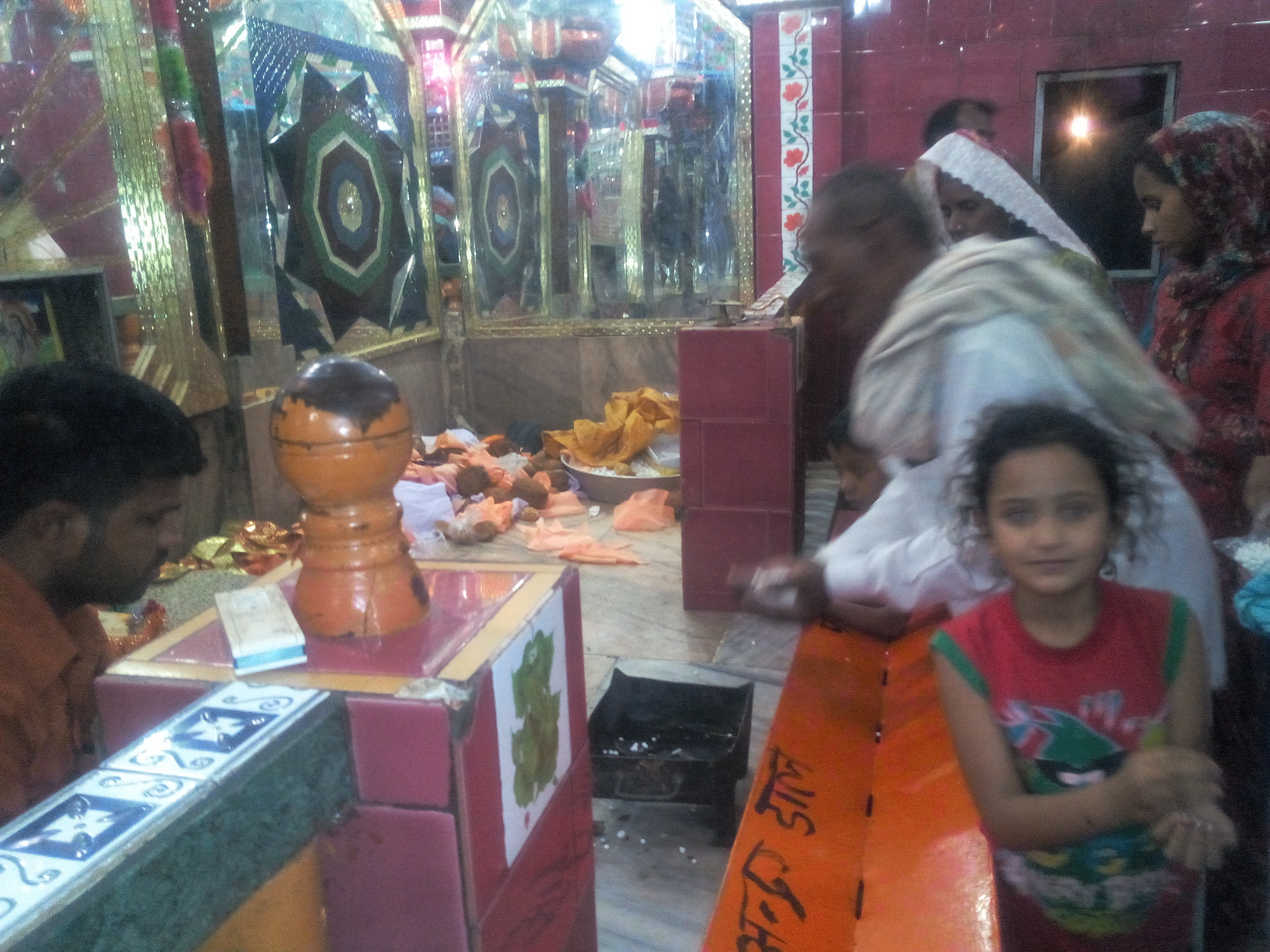
Inside Gusainji temple, Junjala, Rajasthan, India.
