= List of villages in Degana tehsil =

List of Villages

Villages located in Degana Tehsil, district Nagour Rajasthan State, India.

- Aakeli -B
- Achhojai
- Achla Ka Khet
- Alniyawas
- Alwas
- Antroli Kallan
- Antroli Khurd
- Bachhwari
- Bachhwas
- Bamna Kalan
- Bamna Khurd
- Banwara
- Banwarla
- Bari Ghati
- Barna
- Basni Jaga
- Bedas Kalan
- Bhadwasi
- Bharli
- Bhawal Charna
- Bhawariya
- Bherunda
- Bichpuri
- Bikharniya Kalan
- Bikharniya Khurd
- Bofli
- Butati
- Chak Chiknas
- Chak Dhani
- Chanda Roon
- Chandni
- Charanwas
- Chardas
- Chiknas
- Chochiyas
- Choliyas
- Chosali
- Chua
- Chui
- Churiyas
- Daboli Khari
- Daboli Mithi
- Dagra
- Dagari
- Degana
- Deogarh
- Deola Kalan
- Deola Mada
- Dhadhariya Kalan
- Dhanipura
- Dodiyana
- Doodhras
- Dookiyasar
- Doongras
- Dugor Achla
- Dugorchiknas
- Dugor dasa ( Rathore Nagri )
- Gaimaliyawas
- Ghana
- Gol
- Gonarda
- Gonardi
- Goredi Chancha (CT)
- Goredi Karna
- Gothra
- Gulabpura
- Gundisar
- Gunsali
- Gurha Jagmalota
- Gurha Jodha
- Habchar
- Harsor
- Himmat Nagar
- Idwa
- Igyasani
- Itawara Bhoja
- Itawara Ladkhani
- Jakhera
- Jalsoo Kalan
- Jalsoo Khurd
- Jalsoo Nanak
- Jaswantpura
- Jawa Sisodiya
- Jetpura Kalan
- Jetpura Khurd
- Jhagarwas
- Jodhras
- Kalan Ka Was
- Kalni Kumaran
- Kalyanpura
- Kanwal
- Karasora
- Kartasar
- Keriya Rawan
- Khanpura
- Khariya Kalan
- Khariya Khurd
- Kharolwas
- Khatolai
- Kheri Champa
- Kherwa
- Khindas
- Khivtana
- Khiyas
- Khuri Kalan
- Khuri Khurd
- Killa
- Kirad
- Kitalsar
- Kod
- Kodiya
- Kutiyasani Kalan
- Kutiyasani Khurd
- Ladpura
- Lakheena
- Langod
- Lawadar
- Luniyas
- Maharana
- Mandal Deva
- Mandal Jodha
- Mandelpura
- Manjhee
- Mathaniya
- Meora
- Mithriya
- Miyasar
- Modriya
- Mogas
- Mori Kalan
- Moriyana
- Narsingh Basni
- Nathawara
- Nathawari
- Nenas bidsya ki dhani
- Nimbari Chandawatan
- Nimbari Kalan
- Nimbari Kothariyan
- Nimbola Biswa
- Nimbola Kalan
- Nimbola Khurd
- Nimbola Purohitan
- Noond
- karwa ki dhani
- Oriyana
- Pachranda Khurd
- Paliyas
- Palri Kalan
- Pandwala
- Patniya
- Peepliya
- Polas Vishnoiyan
- Poonas
- Pundlota
- Puniyas
- Rajapura
- Rajlota
- Rajod
- Rakiyasani
- Raliyawata
- Ramgarh
- Ramsari
- Ranas
- Rata Dhoondha
- Rawaliyawas
- Rawatkhera
- Rewat
- Rohisara
- Sandas
- Saneriya
- Sanjoo
- Sanwaliyawas
- Sarsanda
- Sathana Kalan
- Sathana Khurd
- Sathani
- Shahpura
- Shekhpura
- Sindhlas
- Sirasana
- Soodwar
- Sukhwasni
- Sundari
- Suraj Garh
- Suriyas
- Surpura
- Tamroli
- Tehla
- Thanwala
- Thata
- Tilanesh
- Udiyas
