= List of villages in Jayal tehsil =

This is a list of villages located in Jayal Tehsil, Rajasthan State, India.

- Aheerpura
- Ajabpura
- Akora
- Ambali
- Khidarpura
- Arsinga
- Bagrasar
- Balaji Nagar
- Barnel
- Barsuna
- Batwari
- Berasar
- Bhawla
- Bhiniyad
- Bhiniyad Chak-1(A)
- Bodind Kalan
- Bodind Khurd
- Borwa
- Boseri
- Bugarda
- Burdi
- Chawad
- Chawali
- Chhajoli
- Chhapra
- Chhawata Kalan
- Chhawata Khurd
- Danta
- Deediya Kalan
- Deediya Khurd
- Deh
- Dehroli
- Dhanani
- Dharna
- Dhatiyad
- Dheejpura
- Dhehari
- Dodoo
- Dotina
- Dugastau, Rajasthan
- Dugoli
- Ewad
- Firozpura
- Gadriya
- Geloli
- Gorau
- Goth
- Gugriyali
- Gujariyawas
- Gumanpura
- Gurharohili
- Hirasani
- Igyar
- Jakhan
- Jalniyasar
- Janewa (East)
- Janewa (West)
- Janwas
- Jayal
- Jhalalar
- Jhareli
- Jocheena
- Jyani
- Kachras
- Kalvi
- Kameriya
- Kangsiya
- Kasari
- Kashipura
- Kasnau
- Kathoti
- Khabariyana
- Khanpura Manjra
- Khangar
- Khara Manjra
- Khari Jodha
- Khatoo Kalan
- Kheraheerawas
- Kherat
- Khinyala
- Khinyawas
- Kishanpura
- Kunwar Khera
- Kubota
- Manglod
- Matasukh
- Meetha Manjra
- Merwas
- Moti Nagar
- Mundi
- Mundiyau
- Neem Nagar
- Nimbora
- Nokha Jodha
- Nooriyas
- Nosariya
- Pannapura
- Peendiya
- Phardod
- Piriyara
- Rajod
- Rampura-A
- Rampura-B
- Ramsar
- Ratanga
- Rohina
- Rol
- Rooniya
- Rotoo
- Sandeela
- Sedau
- Shivnagar
- Silariya
- Somana
- Soneli
- Surpaliya
- Suwadiya
- Talniyau
- Tangla
- Tangli
- Tanwara
- Tarnau
- Tatarwa
- Tatarwi
- Tejasar
- Ubasi
- Unchaira
