= Sarsanda =

- village
- Location in Rajasthan, India Sarsanda (India)
- Coordinates: 26.81488°N 74.16318°E
- Country: India
- State: Rajasthan

Population
  - Total: 1,316

Languages
  - Official: Hindi
- Time zone: UTC+5:30 (IST)
- PIN: 341514
- ISO 3166 code: RJ-IN
- Sex ratio: 0.9685 ♂/♀

Sarsanda is a village in the Aantroli Kalan Gram Panchayat of the Degana Tehsil of the Nagaur District of the Rajasthan State of India. It is 117 km driving distance from Nagaur, at 26.81488°N 74.16318°E.

== Community ==
Sarsanda has a total population of 1,316 or 1,322, of which 49.2% are male and 50.8% are female.
