= Paboosar =

Coordinates: 28°12′44.11″N 74°30′40.22″E

Paboosar is a village located in Khinvsar Tehsil, in the Nagaur district of the Indian state of Rajasthan.

Paboosar is 55 km away from the sub-district's headquarters of Khinvsar and 80 km away from district's headquarters of Nagaur. Paboosar is administered by an elected Sarpanch (Head of Village).

The village occupies 3,689 hectares. As per 2009 stats, Pabusar is the gram panchayat of Paboosar village.

== Population ==
The population of 2,956 is divided into 521 households, including 1551 males and 1405 females as per Population Census 2011. The population of children with age 0-6 is 578 or 19.55%. The sex ratio is 906 which is lower than Rajasthan state average of 928 whereas the Child Sex Ratio is 1007, higher than Rajasthan average of 888.

In 2011, the literacy rate was 54.42% compared to 66.11% of Rajasthan. Male literacy stands at 67.85% while female literacy rate was 39.19%. 32.95% of the population consists of Scheduled Caste(SCs).
