= Basni Belima =

Basni Belima Basni
- town
- Nickname: Basni
- Location in Nagaur Rajasthan, India Basni Belima (India)
- Coordinates: 27.17°N 73.65°E
- Country: India
- State: Rajasthan
- Nagaur: Nagaur
- Basnipur: 4 July 1786
- Named for: Basan Siraj

Government
  - Type: Local Self Government
  - Body: Gram Sabha

Area
  - Total: 4.64 km^{2} (1.79 sq mi)
- Elevation: 291 m (955 ft)

Population (2011)
  - Total: 29,187
  - Density: 6,290/km^{2} (16,300/sq mi)

Hodge Podge Mawrwari
  - Official: Hindi And Marwari And Urdu is widely spoken.
- Time zone: UTC+5:30 (IST)
- PIN: 341021
- Website: www.nagaur.rajasthan.gov.in

Basni Belima (also known as simply Basni) is a census town in Nagaur district in the state of Rajasthan,

Gully Classes Foundation a Non-profit Organization is working from Last 3 Year in Basni Belima for Education and Promotion of Sports in the Village along with Hurmat-E-Taleem Foundation. Gully Classes Foundation working in Basni Belima since 2021 for the Education, Environment, and Personality Development of Students. They also Converted the old closed government School of Bansi Belima into a Library and Reading Room currently Known as the Community Resource Centre. Currently, 70+ students are coming to this Community Resource Centre from 10 nearby Villages.

== Demographics ==
As of 2011 India census, Basni Belima had a population of 43,786. Males constitute 50% of the population and females 50%. Basni Belima has an average literacy rate of 63%, the national average of 74.75%; with 63% of the males and 37% of females literate. 35% of the population is under 18 years of age.

The majority of the residents in the town follow Islam which is 96.01% against the total population and the minorityHinduism which is 3.82%.
