= Rewat =

Coordinates: 26°34′N 74°34′E

Rewat is a small village near Degana, Nagaur district, Rajasthan in northern India, having 500-600 houses.

One of India's most significant deposits of tungsten ore is at Rewat.
