= Inana, Rajasthan =

Inana Nagaur
- Village
- Location in Nagaur, Rajasthan, India
- Coordinates: 27.1302917°N 73.8269627°E
- Country: India
- State: Rajasthan
- District: Nagaur
- Tehsil: Mundwa
- Settled: Ancient
- Founder: Khedadhani Baba
- Elevation: 334 m (1,096 ft)

Population (2020)
  - Total: 9,870

Languages
  - Official: Marwari; Hindi; English
- Time zone: UTC+5:30 (IST)
- PIN: 341026
- Telephone code: 01585
- ISO 3166 code: RJ-IN
- Vehicle registration: RJ-21

Inana is a village in Mundwa Tehsil in Nagaur district in the Indian state of Rajasthan. It belongs to the Ajmer division of Rajasthan. It is located 13 km east from district headquarters in Nagaur, 8 km from Mundwa main town and 232 km from state capital Jaipur. The postal code of Inana is 341026.

== Demographics ==
In 2020, the population of Inana was 9,870, with 51.32% of the population male at 5,065 and 48.68% female at 4,805.

Marwari is the local language in Inana. Hindi and English are additionally spoken as the median of communication.

== Transport ==
Marwar Mundwa railway stations are the nearest to Inana, however, Nagaur and Merta Road railway stations are more major stations further nearby. The nearest airport is Jodhpur Airport in jodhpur.
