= Dahima =

The Dahima is a Rajput clan in India. They are one of the 36 royal races of Rajputs. This clan originated from Nagaur district of Rajasthan. Many of them worship Dadhimati Mata as their family goddess.
