= Khindas =

- Village
- Interactive map of Khindas
- Coordinates: 26°52′4″N 74°11′28″E
- Country: India
- State: Rajasthan
- District: Bikaner

Population (2011)
  - Total: 3,034

Khindas is a village in Bikaner district, Rajasthan, India.

== Politics and governance ==
Khindasar village is administrated by a sarpanch (head of village), Patasi Devi is elected to 178 vote win.

== Demographics ==
Khindas is a small village located in Degana of Nagaur district, Rajasthan. According to the 2011 census of India, the village has population of 1061, comprising 207 families, of which 543 are males and 518 are females.

The population of children aged from 0 to 6 is 148, making up 13.95% of total population of village. The average sex ratio of Khindas is 954, higher than Rajasthan state average of 928. The child sex ratio for the Khindas is 1085, higher than Rajasthan average of 888.

Khindas has a literacy rate of 63.53%, lower than Rajasthan's rate of 66.11%. The male literacy rate was 74.79%, while the female literacy rate was 51.47%.
