= Karnoo =

Karnoo (Karnu) is a village in the Khinvsar Tehsil of Nagaur district in Rajasthan, India. The nearest town is Khinvsar.

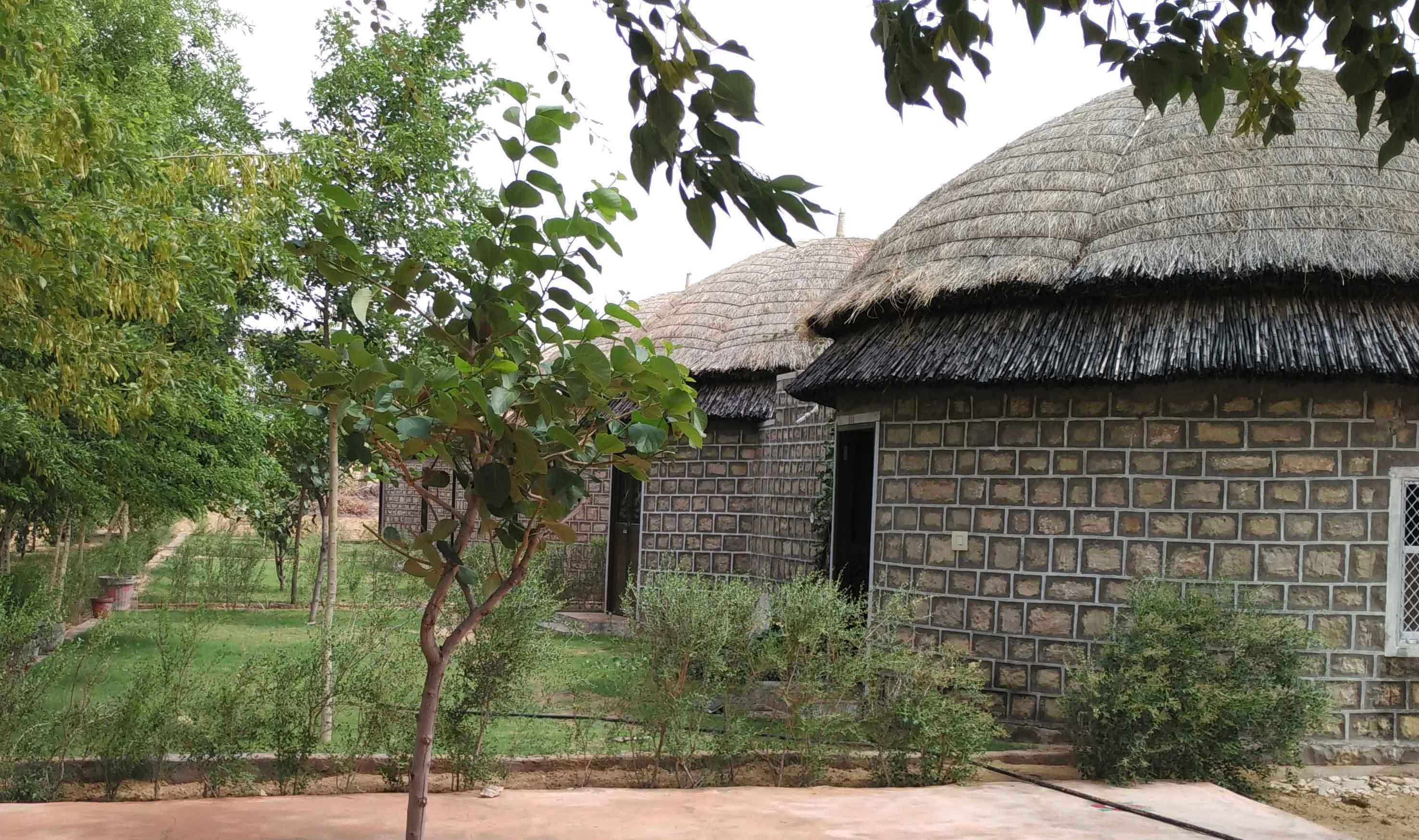
