= Sudrasan =

- Village
- Interactive map of Sudrasan
- Coordinates: 27.4257°N 74.8152°E
- Country: India
- State: Rajasthan
- District: Nagaur
- Tehsil: Didwana

Government
  - Body: Gram panchayat

Area
  - Total: 15.09 km^{2} (5.83 sq mi)
- Elevation: 342 m (1,122 ft)

Population (2011)
  - Total: 3,910
  - Density: 259/km^{2} (671/sq mi)

Languages
  - Official: Hindi
- Time zone: UTC+5:30 (IST)
- Postal code: 341551
- ISO 3166 code: RJ-37
- Vehicle registration: RJ-37-

Sudrasan village is located in Didwana Tehsil of Nagaur district in Rajasthan, India. It is situated 32 km (20 mi) from sub-district headquarters Didwana and 132 km (82 mi) from district headquarters Nagaur. As per 2009 stats, Sudrasan village is also a gram panchayat.

The geographical area is 15.09 km^{2} (5.83 sq mi). Pin code is 341551. The total population is 3,910. There are about 671 houses in Sudrasan village. Losal is the nearest town to Sudrasan, and is approximately 7 km (4.3 mi) away. Local languages include Marwari, Hindi, English, Urdu and Rajasthani.

== Demography ==
Census Parameter	Census Data
Total population	3910
Total No of Houses	671
Female population %	50.9 % (1991)
Total Literacy rate %	59.6 % (2331)
Female Literacy rate	24.5 % (959)
Scheduled Tribes population %	0.2 % (7)
Scheduled Caste population %	16.7 % (653)
Working population %	39.2 %
Children (0 -6) Population by 2011	506
Girl children (0 -6) Population % by 2011	47.6 % (241)
