= Manjhee =

Village in degana tehsil

Manjhee (also spelled Manjhi) is a village in Degana tehsil, Nagaur district in the Indian state of Rajasthan. As of the 2011 Census of India, it has a population of 3,304, with 1,651 males and 1,653 females.

It is located 14 km away from degana tehsil and 81 km from its district Nagaur.

Education:

- Govt. senior secondary school manjhee
- krishna bal niketan school manjhee
- ranabai school manjhee
- government secondary school regaro ki basti, manjhee
