= Ranigaon =

- village
- Location in Rajasthan, India Ranigaon (Rajasthan)
- Coordinates: 27°6′0″N 74°25′0″E
- Country: India
- State: Rajasthan
- District: Nagaur

Population
  - Total: 9,500

Languages
  - Official: Hindi
- Time zone: UTC+5:30 (IST)
- ISO 3166 code: RJ-IN
- Vehicle registration: RJ-37
- Coastline: 0 kilometres (0 mi)
- Nearest city: Makrana
- Sex ratio: 52:48 ♂/♀
- Literacy: 60%
- Lok Sabha constituency: Nagaur
- Climate: Dry (Köppen)
- Avg. summer temperature: 47–48 °C (117–118 °F)
- Avg. winter temperature: 5–10 °C (41–50 °F)

Ranigaon is a village of Makrana in Nagaur district, Rajasthan.It is almost 35 km away from Makrana towards Nagaur.

The Makrana Panchayat Smiti member from the Village is Shri Mahipal Singh..Thakur Shri.Abhay Singh Rathore who was the First Sarpanch of Ranigaon village & he was served as a Sarpanch 30 year continues. Now the current sarpanch of this gram panchayat is Mr.Annaram. In ranigaon there are many facilities available such as primary healthcare centre,emitra services& ration distrubtion centre etc.. Basically the main part of the village is on the road side (highway khatu-makrana)

one can get many facilities here such as transportation to various cities various shops for goods&services like vegetable shop,grocery items,building material,Tyre repair & replace etc.
