= Goredi Chancha =

- Census town
- Location in Rajasthan, India Goredi Chancha (India)
- Coordinates: 26.894°N 74.3185°E
- Country: India
- State: Rajasthan
- District: Nagaur

Population (2001)
  - Total: 9,834

Languages
  - Official: Hindi
- Time zone: UTC+5:30 (IST)
- ISO 3166 code: RJ-IN

Goredi Chancha is a census town in Nagaur district in the Indian state of Rajasthan.

== Demographics ==
As of 2001 India census, Goredi Chancha had a population of 9834. Males constitute 53% of the population and females 47%. Goredi Chancha has an average literacy rate of 64%, higher than the national average of 59.5%: male literacy is 75%, and female literacy is 51%. In Goredi Chancha, 16% of the population is under 6 years of age.
