= Bhawal Charna =

- Village
- Country: India
- State: Rajasthan
- District: Nagaur
- Founder: bhanwar singh khiriya

Government
  - Body: Gram panchayat

Population (2011)
  - Total: 1,500

Languages
  - Official: Hindi
- Time zone: UTC+5:30 (IST)
- PIN: 341021
- Telephone code: 01582
- ISO 3166 code: IN-RJ
- Vehicle registration: RJ 21

Bhawal Charna is a village in Nagaur district, India. As of the 2011 Census of India, its population was 434.
