= Lampolai =

- Village
- Interactive map of Lampolai
- Country: India
- State: Rajasthan
- District: Nagaur
- Municipality: Merta City
- Time zone: UTC+5:30 (IST)

Lampolai is a village in Nagaur District in Rajasthan State in India. It is located on the Ajmer-Nagaur Road, east of Merta City.
