= Gusainji Maharaj =

Hindu holy man

Gusainji Maharaj is a holy figure associated with Hinduism and Islam. One of the prominent temples dedicated to him is situated in Junjala village of Nagaur district in the Indian state of Rajasthan.

According to legend, during the Vamana avatar, a manifestation of God in Hindu mythology, the first step was taken in Mecca and Medina, which became significant locations for Muslim worship and the annual Hajj pilgrimage. The second step took place in Kurukshetra, where a sacred bathing lake is located. The third step came near the Ram Sarovar in the village of Junjala, where the temple dedicated to Gusainji Maharaj stands. This site, known as Tirtha Ram Sarovar, attracts pilgrims. Hindus refer to it as Gusainji Maharaj, while Muslims know it as Baba Kadam Rasool.
