= Sanjoo =

Sanjoo saanju
- City
- Location in Rajasthan, India Sanjoo (India)
- Coordinates: 27.0076°N 74.1636°E
- Country: India
- State: Rajasthan
- District: Nagaur
- Elevation: 296 m (971 ft)

Population (2011)
  - Total: 7,688

Languages
  - Official: Hindi, Marwari
- Time zone: UTC+5:30 (IST)
- PIN: 341503
- Telephone code: 01587
- Vehicle registration: RJ 21

Sanjoo is a town and tehsil in Nagaur district of Rajasthan, India. The town has a population of about 7,688.

== Geography ==
It lies (971 feet) at co-ords 27°00′27″N 74°09′49″E. Sanjoo is located 20.01 km from nearby town, Degana Junction and 58.26 km from its District headquarters Nagaur. It is 163 km far from its State capital, Jaipur.
