= Merta City =

Merta City Medantaka
- City
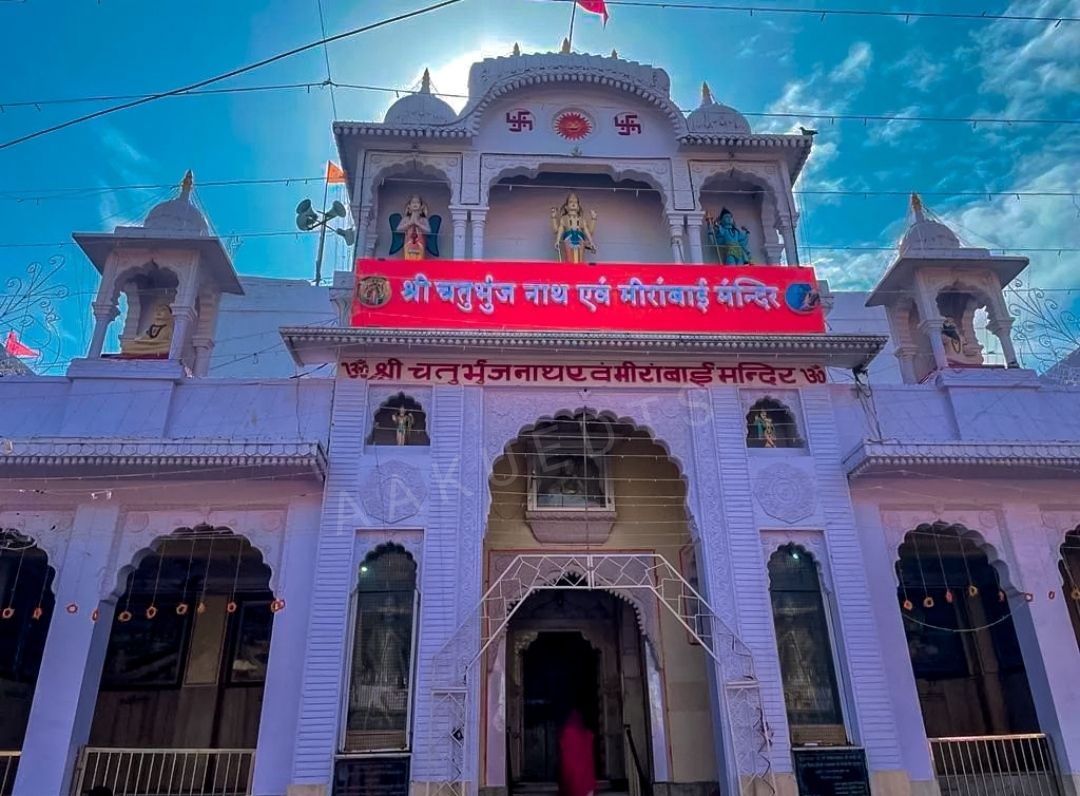
- Charbhuja Nath Temple / Meera Bai Temple
- Nickname: City of Meera
- Location in Nagaur district, Rajasthan Merta City (India)
- Coordinates: 26.6500°N 74.0333°E
- Country: India
- State: Rajasthan
- District: Nagaur
- Founder: Rao Duda (Mertiya) Rathore

Government
  - Type: Democratic
- Elevation: 312 m (1,024 ft)

Population (2001)
  - Total: 40,221

• Official Language - Rajasthani, Hindi
- Time zone: GMT+5:30
- PIN: 341510

Merta City is a city and a municipality located near Nagaur City in Nagaur district in the Indian state of Rajasthan. Merta is also known for its link with Mira Bai, the devotee of Lord Krishna. The Mira Mahal Museum houses memories related to Mira Bai's lifetime.

== History ==
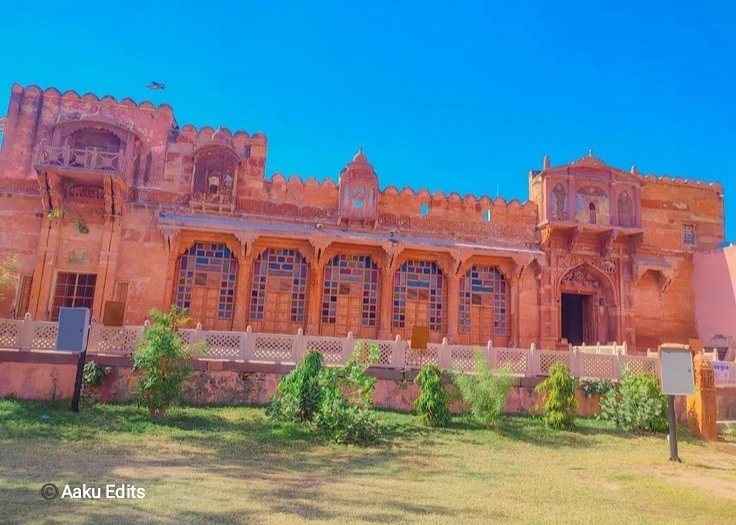
Meera Smarak Merta City

The ancient name of Merta City was Medantaka. Nagabhatta Pratihar from Pratihar Rajput dynasty of Mandore established himself at Medantaka and made the city his capital. In 13th Century, Alauddin Khilji took control of this place and placed Tajuddin Ali as his viceroy at Medantaka. Later, Rao Jodha granted Merta as Jagir to his son Rao Duda. From Merta, Duda's descendant got the name of Mertiya Rathores. Rao Duda built a palace, temple of Chaturbhuj Ji and Dudasar Pond.

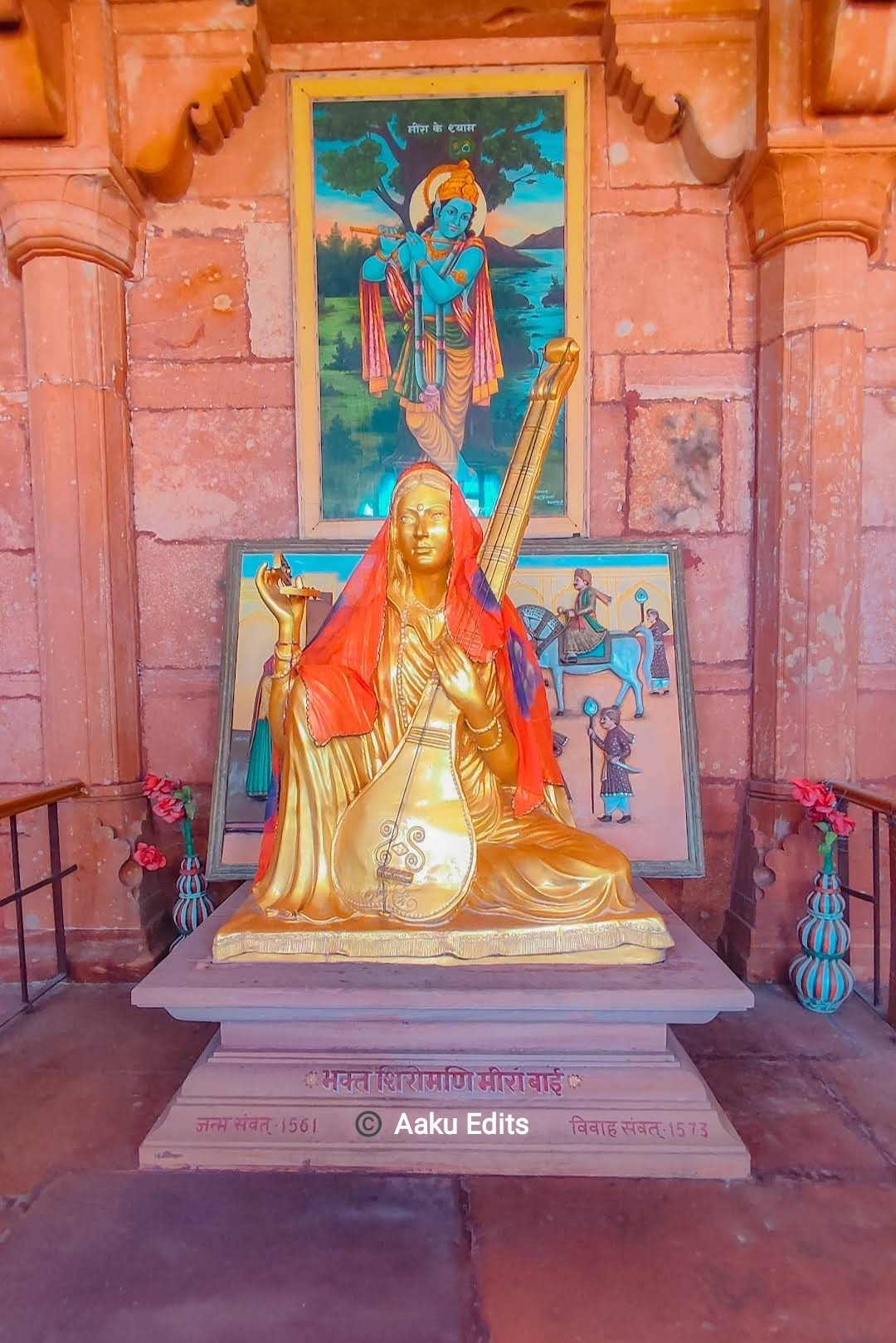
Meera Smarak Meera Bai Ji

After Rao Duda, Rao Veeramdeo ruled in Merta. Veeramdeo's niece was the famous poet and devotee of Krishna, Mira Bai. Veeramdeo also took part in Battle of Khanwa. When Maldev Rathore became the King of Marwar, he expanded his territory and annexed Merta from Viramdeo Mertiya. Rao Maldev built Malkot fort in Merta.

After the Battle of Sammel, Merta came under control of Sher Shah. After sometime, Merta again came under control of Rao Maldeo. Veeramdeo's son Jaimal Mertiya moved to Mewar. Near Dagolai Talab, Capt. De Bourbon's grave is located. He was in Scindia's army and died of wounds he received in Battle of Merta.

=== Brief history of Mertiyas ===
Merta-Estate was soon merged with Jodhpur State and Jaimal's 14 sons were given small principalities nearby. Akbar gave half Merta to Rao Surtan Singh and half to Rao Keshavdas Mertiya sons of Rao Jaimal. Merta was distributed in Jagirs and Thikanas by independently Mertiya's like

Riya, Budsu (4 villages), Borawar (7 villages), Badu-Jagir(13 villages) Mannano, Ladoli, Kalwo, Gular, Jawla, Meethri, Alniyawas, Maroth, Badnore-Jagir, Ghanerao and others

The same spirit was shown by many descendants of the Mertia Royal Family, including the Chiefs of Rian, Methri and Alniyawas who fought against the rebels of Kumpawat clan in the battle of Merta in 1790 AD and suffered mass annihilation. One of the scion of the family who rose to prominence during the reign of Aurangzeb was Maharaja Raghunath Singh Mertiya (1660–1683 AD), who conquered Maroth previous capital of Gaurawati/ Gaurati and is ancestor of the rulers of Panch Mahal Maroth.

== Demographics ==
As of 2001 India census, Merta City had a population of 40,252. Males constitute 53% of the population and females 47%. Merta City has an average literacy rate of 60%, higher than the national average of 59.5%: male literacy is 72%, and female literacy is 48%. About 16% of the population is under 6 years of age. Merta City is a holy city for Hindus as it is the birthplace of Meera Bai, the famous Devotee of God Krishna.

== Transport ==
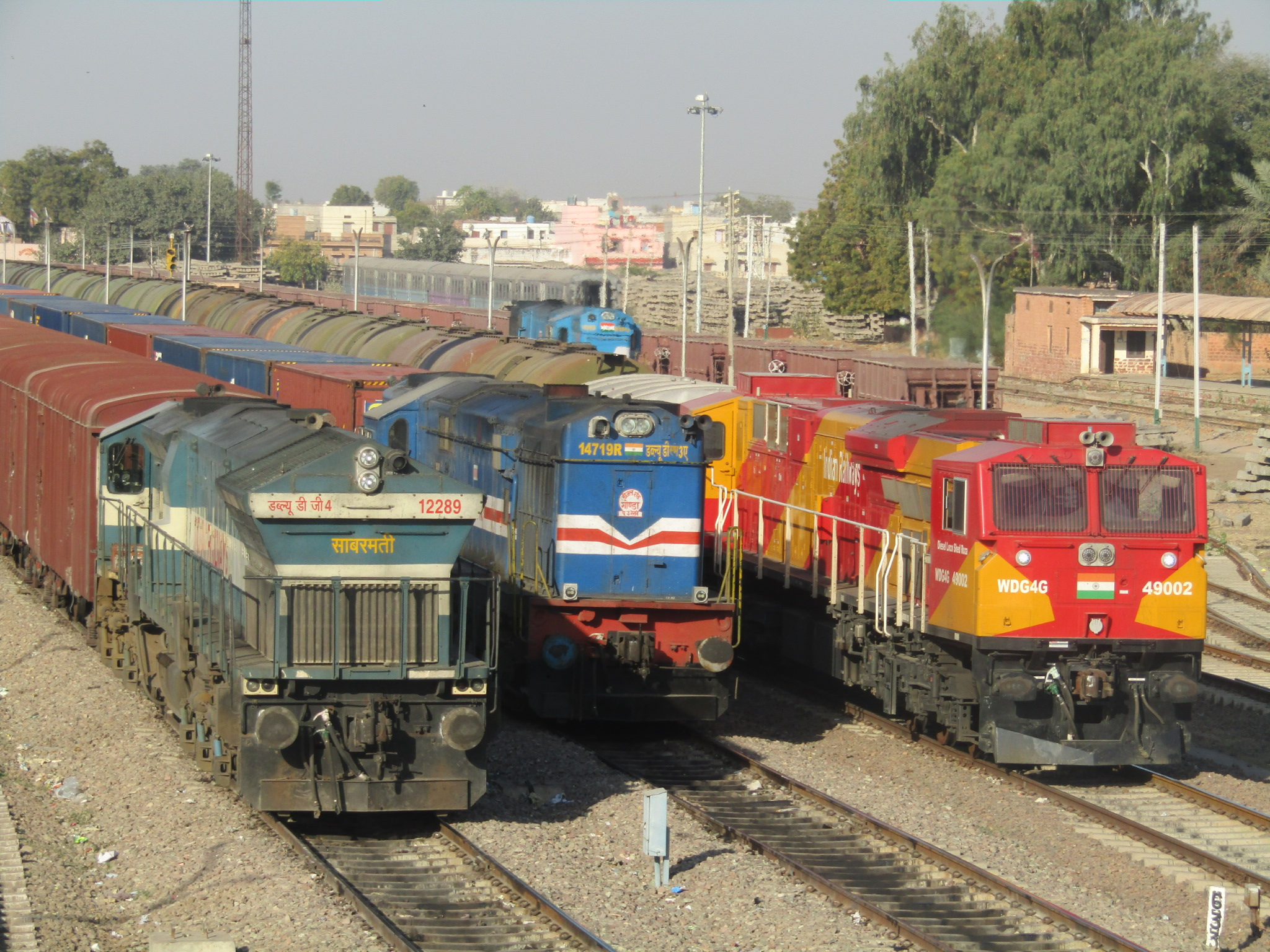
Diesel locomotives halted at Merta Road Junction railway station

Merta City is off the Jodhpur-Bathinda line but with a link. Merta City is middle point of Rajasthan, facilitating easy access.

1) 15 km away from Merta Road Junction Railway Station

2) 80 km away from Nagaur Railway Station

3) 60 km Away from Pushkar (Ajmer) Railway Station

4) 80 km away from Ajmer Junction Railway Station

5) 120 km away from Jodhpur Junction Railway Station

6) 250 km away from Jaipur Junction Railway Station (capital)
