= Raithaliya =

- Village
- Country: India
- State: Rajasthan
- District: Nagaur

Raithaliya is a small village in Nagaur district of Rajasthan, India. Raithaliya comes under Asarwa Panchayat.
