= Inana (disambiguation) =

Inana is the ancient Mesopotamian goddess of love, war, and fertility.

Inana may also refer to:

- Inana, Rajasthan, a village in Rajasthan, India

== See also ==
- Inanna (disambiguation)
