= Rao Gopaldasji =

Thakur of Ransigaon and Pali (now Rajasthan)
- Reign: 1579 - ?
- Predecessor: Rao Mandaldasji
- Successor: Rao Vithaldasji
- Father: Rao Mandaldasji

Rao Gopaldasji was a 16th-century Thakur of Ransigaon and Pali in Rajasthan, India. He succeeded his father Rao Mandaldasji in 1579. When the Marwar region was confiscated by Akbar during the reign of Rao Chandra Sen, Rao Gopaldasji made a diplomatic move by convincing Mota Raja Udai Singh to meet Akbar to restore the throne of Marwar.
