= Nagori (caste) =

Muslim community found in the state of Gujarat in India

The Nagori is a community from Nagaur found in the state of Rajasthan in India. In other parts of India, the people are called Kriyagars.

== See also ==
- Gujarati Muslims
