= Jhorda =

Village in Rajasthan, India

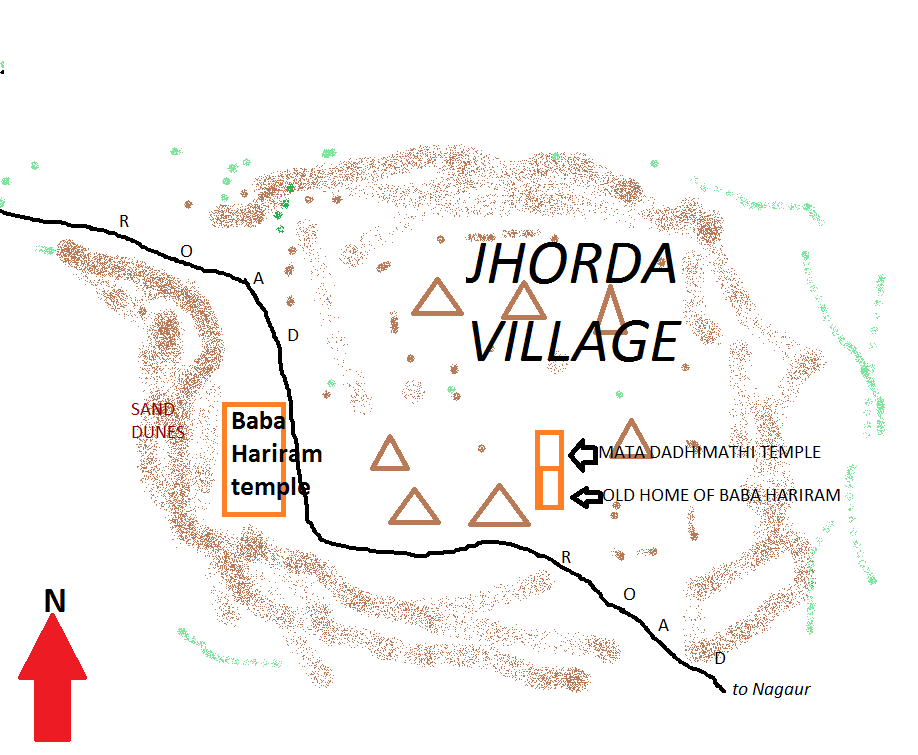
A map of Jhorda village showing HARIRAM temple, the old house of Hariram, and Mata Dadhimathi temple.

Jhorda is a village in Nagaur, a tehsil of Nagaur district in Rajasthan, India. At the time of a census conducted in 2011, the population of Jhorda was 1163 people, with 553 females and 610 males, including 261 families.

The village is located about 35 Km north of Nagaur. Jorda is known for being the birthplace of KandanKalpit ( डब डब भरिया बाईसा रा नैन ), a well-known poet, and of the saint Baba Hariram. A tourist hotspot is the Baba Hariram Temple.
