= Mundwa =

Mundwa Marwar Mundwa
- City
- Location in Rajasthan, India Mundwa (India)
- Coordinates: 27.07°N 73.82°E
- Country: India
- State: Rajasthan
- District: Nagaur
- Elevation: 335 m (1,099 ft)

Population (2001)
  - Total: 16,004

Languages
  - Official: Hindi
  - Other: Marwari, Rajasthani, Urdu, English
- Time zone: UTC+5:30 (IST)
- PIN: 341026
- Telephone code: 01584
- ISO 3166 code: RJ-IN
- Vehicle registration: RJ-21

Mundwa also known as Marwar Mundwa, is a city and a municipality in Nagaur district in the Indian state of Rajasthan. Mundwa is a tehsil in Nagaur district of Rajasthan State, India. It is located 20 km towards South from district headquarters Nagaur. 231 km from state capital Jaipur towards East. Marwari is the Local Language here. Also People Speaks Hindi, English, Urdu and Rajasthani. Mundwa was also a constituency of Rajasthan Assembly before it was changed to Khinvsar because of political reasons. Now Mundwa is made a Tehsil. It is also allotted a Dhan Mandi. It is a pilgrimage centre for the shrine of the Sufi Haz Jana Sahid and is also famous for the lot of temples.

== Politics ==
Mundwa Constituency of Rajasthan Assembly Result Before Delimitations

- 1977 - Ramdev Beniwal
- 1980 - Harendra Mirdha
- 1985 - Ramdev Beniwal
- 1990 - Habibur Rahman
- 1995 - Habibur Rahman
- 1998 - Habibur Rahman
- 2003 - Usha Poonia

== Geography ==
Mundwa is located at 27.07°N 73.82°E. It has an average elevation of 335 metres (1099 feet).
There are four Talabs on all the four directions of Mundwa.
Names of these Talabs are

1. Gyantalav
2. Lakholav
3. Pokhandi
4. Motelav

== Demographics ==
As of 2001 India census, Mundwa had a population of 16,004. Males constitute 51% of the population and females 49%. Mundwa has an average literacy rate of 47%, lower than the national average of 59.5%: male literacy is 61%, and female literacy is 33%. In Mundwa, 18% of the population is under 6 years of age.
