= Kuchera =

- Town
- Location in Rajasthan, India Kuchera (India)
- Coordinates: 26.98°N 73.97°E
- Country: India
- State: Rajasthan
- District: Nagaur
- Elevation: 301 m (988 ft)

Population (2001)
  - Total: 19,563

Languages
  - Official: Hindi
- Time zone: UTC+5:30 (IST)
- Vehicle registration: RJ-21

Kuchera is a town and a municipality in Nagaur district in the Indian state of Rajasthan.

== Notable persons ==
- Baldeo Ram Mirdha (1889-1953), Indian independence activist, social reformer and popularly known as Kisan Kesari
- Ram Niwas Mirdha (1924-2010), Indian statesman and cultural administrator
