= Inanna (disambiguation) =

Inanna is an ancient Mesopotamian goddess.

Inanna may also refer to:

- Inanna Fossa, a fossa on Pluto
- Inanna Publications, a Canadian book publisher
- Inanna Sarkis (born 1993), Canadian social media personality and actress
- Princess Inanna, a character in American adventure comedy film Year One (film)

== See also ==
- Inana (disambiguation)
