= Khimsar Fort =

Fort in Nagaur, Rajasthan

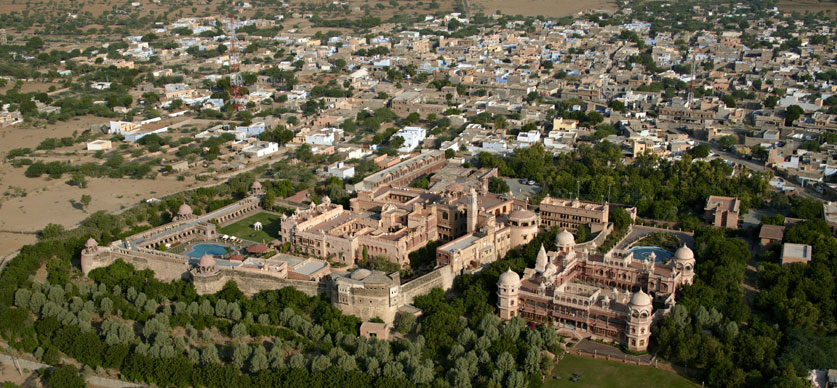

- Location within India
- 26.9769°N 73.4008°E
- Location: Rajasthan, India

History
- Founded: Rao Karamsji, 8th son of Rao Jodha
- Built: 1523 (Early 16th Century)

Site notes
- Area: Khimsar Village, Rajasthan

Khimsar Fort is a fort located near Khinvsar village, in the Nagaur district of Rajasthan in India, halfway between Jodhpur and Nagaur, on the eastern edge of the Thar Desert. The fortress was built in 1523 by Rao Karamsji, the 8th son of Rao Jodha of Jodhpur. Aurangzeb used to stay there while in Nagaur.
