= Borawar =

Town in Rajasthan, India

Coordinates: 27°01′N 74°41′E

Borawar is a town and municipality in Makrana tehsil of Nagaur district in the Indian state of Rajasthan. Its original name (with diacritics) is Borāwar. It is located a few kilometres west of Makrana city. PIN-341502.
