= Shishma =

Shishma Шишма
- Village
- Location within Bashkortostan Location within Russia
- Coordinates: 54°03′N 55°04′E
- Country: Russia
- Region: Bashkortostan
- District: Alsheyevsky District
- Time zone: UTC+5:00

Shishma (Russian: Шишма; Bashkir: Шишмә, Şişmä) is a rural locality (a village) in Ibrayevsky Selsoviet, Alsheyevsky District, Bashkortostan, Russia. The population was 158 as of 2010. There are 2 streets.

== Geography ==
Shishma is located 14 km south of Rayevsky (the district's administrative centre) by road.
