= Dadheech Brahmin =

Brahmin community in India

The Dadheech Brahmins, more usually called Dahima and also spelled Dadhich, which is their preferred spelling, are a subgroup of Brahmins in the Indian states of Rajasthan, Gujarat, Maharashtra and Haryana.

== Origin ==
The Dadheech Brahmin caste has a myth of origin which appears first to have been recorded in the late nineteenth or early twentieth centuries with the publication of the Dadhimathi Puranam, a Sanskrit text comprising 966 verses. The publication was typical of its time, when many castes in India were forming organisations and promoting mythical origins as a response to the social and economic changes under the British Raj administration. Prior to this, the only records of Dadheech people were those of traditional genealogist communities. The work attempts to fuse the creation of the caste itself, based on a genealogy of Hindu mythology, with the origin and deeds of Dadhimati as recounted both in well-known Hindu texts and regional story-telling. It is, according to Lawrence Babb, "a manifestation of an effort on the part of an educated and activist element among the Dadhich Brahmins to reconfigure their identity as a community in a way that diverged significantly from older traditions". Further, it contains problematic logic that undermines the claim to be Brahmin.

== History ==
The Dadheech are named after their patron goddess, Dadhimati, and were once prevalent around the Dadhimati Mata Temple that lies between the villages of Goth and Manglod in Nagaur district, Rajasthan. An inscription dating from 608 CE at that temple refers to a community called the Dadhya, whom the Dadheech believe to be ancestors of their own community. They have both gotras and khampas as subdivisions. Examples of the latter include Gothecha, Mangalodya, Asopa, Inanya, Khatoda, Borada, and Didawanya, all of which refer to ancient villages or localities. The temple inscription mentions gotras but not khampas, which may suggest the khampas were a later development. The Puranam mythology notes 144 Hindu sages who originate the alleged 144 exogamous and patrilineal clans of the Dadheech, although in fact there have never been 144 such clans.

Few Dadheech live in the Nagaur area nowadays, with many of them having already begun a process of moving away from it by the time that the Puranam was published. They were relatively well educated and so could get work as professionals or in service jobs, and it may have been their gradual dispersal that in part gave rise to the publication. Babb refers to it was a "window into the mindset of the caste's identity theorists as they found themselves confronting certain problems", including maintaining caste unity in the face of this dispersal and potential challenges to their claimed Brahminic status once they moved into more cosmopolitan areas.

A Dadheech caste association was formed in 1910. It soon ran into difficulties with other castes who worshipped Dadhimati, who is a goddess for many, perhaps all, castes of the region even though little known elsewhere. Thus, probably in 1912, a dispute evolved between the Dadheech and the Parasar community, who were priests of the Dadhimati Mata Temple and probably had been for at least a century. The Parasars attempted to obtain legal recognition of their rights regarding custodianship of the temple, perhaps in reaction to a sensing that the Dadheech were becoming a more organised, mobilised community. This led to a court ruling in 1918 that they had no such rights. The inscription dating from 608 CE, which mentions the Dadhya, may have been significant evidence in the Dadheech victory but at least equally important was the relative sophistication of the Dadheech, who by then were already entering their cosmopolitan phase and had contacts that the less privileged Parasars could not match.

There is a significance to control of the temple that goes beyond the building itself, since control of that also gives control of the land surrounding it and income from shops and stalls. This appears to have been the cause of another dispute involving the Dadheech, this time with a clan of the Jat people called the Bidyasar, who also claim Dadhimati as an ancestor in an origin myth. Much of the history of this comes from word-of-mouth. As with the Parasars, the Bidyasars were initially at a disadvantage due to their rustic status but nonetheless seem to have become embroiled in a struggle for control from some time in the early twentieth century. This struggle became more evident in the 1950s, by which time the Jats had emerged as a significant political force in the state. Nathuram Mirdha, who was a prominent Jat politician, failed in his attempt to establish a boarding school in the temple grounds during the 1950s, then the Jats were upset in the early 1970s when the Dadheech set up a trust to run the temple. The latter incident appears eventually to have been settled in the Dadheech's favour after a protracted legal battle. As of 2011, Jats continue to protest about the temple management but the Dadheech community remains dominant and in control, coming together both physically and emotionally from a distance in defence of their origin myth as ancestors of the goddess.

== Culture ==
One of the inconsistences in the Puranam noted by Babb is the imposition of a gotra system. He says that few Dadheech even now know of which gotra they belong and that their patriclan exogamy predates it in marriage customs. Gotra knowledge seems never to have previously been a prerequisite for marriage but the introduction of a gotra system was seen by the Puranam intellectuals as a necessary part of the claim to be Brahmin.

The temple of Dadhimati is remotely situated and usually sparsely visited but many Dadheech people, and others, attend it around the time of the spring and autumn melas. Dadhichi-Jayanti, the birth date of Dadhichi, is celebrated each year among Dadheech Brahmins by the offering of prayers to the gods, the organisation of kirtans and havans in temples and also sports events for children. Dadheech are the guru of Maheshwari community with different clans being guru of different Maheshwari clans.
