= Deh, India =

Deh
- Tehsil
- Location in Rajasthan, India Deh (India)
- Coordinates: 27.30°N 73.90°E
- Country: India
- State: Rajasthan
- District: Nagaur

Population (2011)
  - Total: Approximately 10,000+

Languages
  - Official: Hindi
- Time zone: UTC+5:30 (IST)
- PIN: 341022
- ISO 3166 code: RJ-21
- Vehicle registration: RJ-21

Deh is a Tehsil in Nagaur district of Rajasthan India

The town Deh is situated at Nagaur-Ladnun National Highway-58, 20 km away from Nagaur

== Geography ==
Deh is located at 27.30°N 73.90°E. It has an average elevation of 292 metres (958 feet).

== Demographics ==
As of 2011 India census, Deh had a population of 10000+.

== Temples ==
Kunjal Mata Temple of goddess Kunjal is located in Deh village of Jayal tehsil in Nagaur district of Rajasthan, India, and 1.3 km away from Deh's Bus Station on Nagaur-Ladnun National Highway-65.

1. Sri Jain goshala, a state of art cow shelter built and maintained by Sri anat goraksha samiti
2. Kunjal Mata is kul devi of Pareek Brahmin's (Joshi Sakraniya and many other Pareek gotras). Temple area is 38 Bigha. It is A Historical Place of Rajasthan.
3. Old Cenatops and Sati Mata Chabutra of former Rulers of Udawat Rajputs Near Talab (Water Lake).
4. Karni Mata Temple Near Talab (Built by Shri Gopal Singh Ji Udawat S/o Late Kamdar Thk. Shri Dhonkal Singh Ji Udawat).
5. Jain Temple and Nasiyan.
6. Bibi Mai Mosque (500 Meters from Village Bus Stand) This is a historical & holy place for Muslims.

== Caste Factor ==
Schedule Caste (SC) constitutes 20.84% while Schedule Tribe (ST) were 0.04% of total population in Deh village.

== Work Profile ==
In Deh village out of total population, 4425 were engaged in work activities. 59.64% of workers describe their work as Main Work (Employment or Earning more than 6 Months) while 40.36% were involved in Marginal activity providing livelihood for less than 6 months. Of 4425 workers engaged in Main Work, 1549 were cultivators (owner or co-owner) while 472 were Agricultural laborer.
