= Dadhimati Mata Temple =

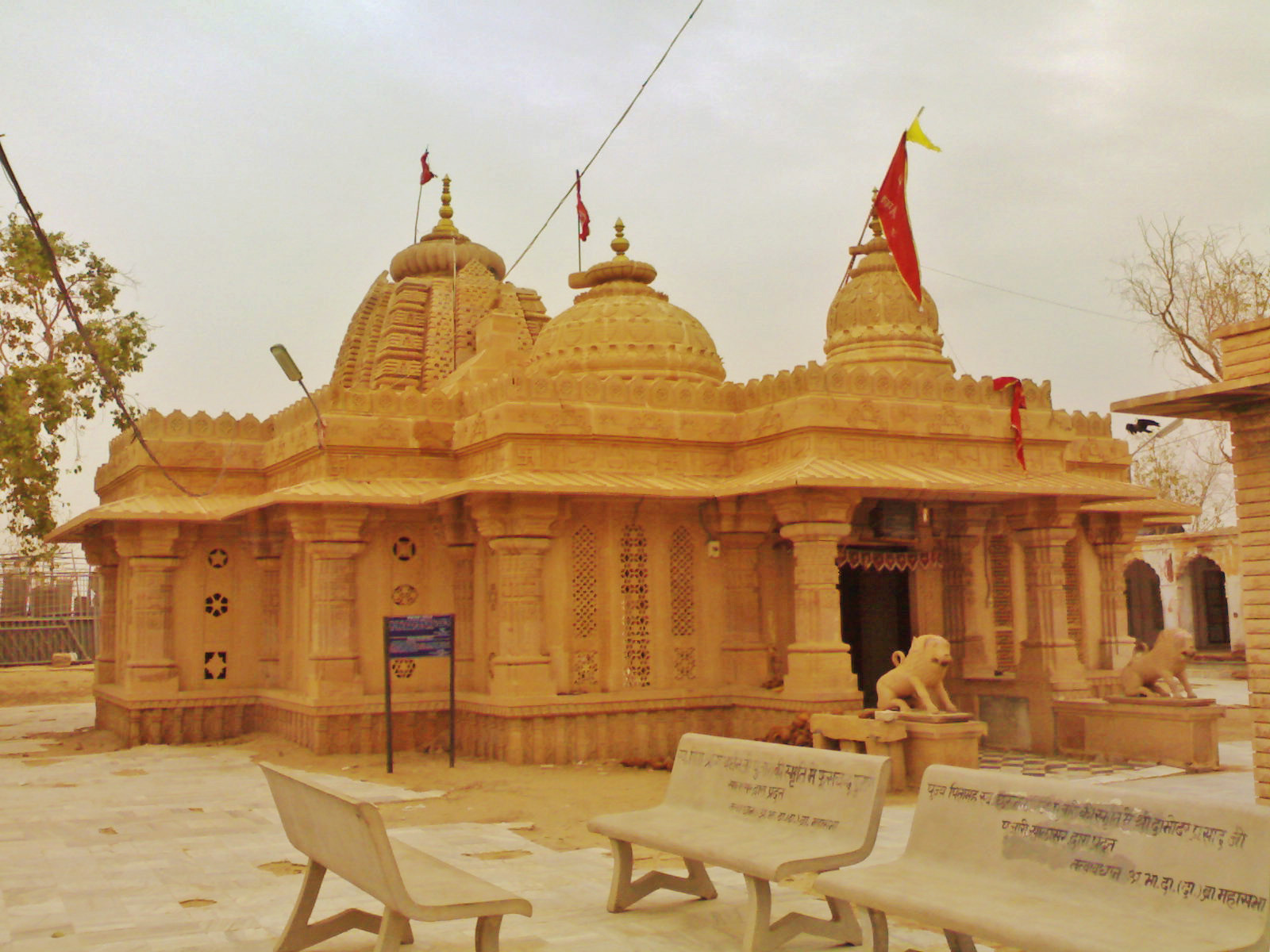
- Temple of Dadhimati Mata in Jayal

Religion
- Affiliation: Hinduism
- District: Nagaur District
- Deity: Goddess Dadhimati ( Incarnation of Goddess Lakshmi)

Location
- Location: Between the villages of Goth and Manglod, Jayal, Nagaur district, Rajasthan, India
- State: Rajasthan
- Country: India
- Interactive map of Dadhimati Mata Temple
- Coordinates: 27.2373°N 74.0755°E

Architecture
- Established: At least 608 CE (as per inscription)

Dadhimati Mata Temple is a Hindu temple of the goddess Dadhimati, located between the villages of Goth and Manglod in the Jayal tehsil of Nagaur district in Rajasthan, India. An inscription found there suggests that it existed at least as long ago at 608 CE.

The only Dadhimati Mata temple in India where devotees perform Abhishek with milk of the mother every day. A huge fair is held twice a year in the Dadhimati Mata temple, during Navratri in the month of Chaitra and Navratri in the month of Ashwin. It is believed that the temple is more than 2000 years old.

The Dadhimati temple is the main center of faith of people from all over the country. Dadhmati Mata is revered since ancient times as the family deity of all castes of this region such as Dahima Brahmin, Dahima Kshatriya, Dahima Vaishya and other castes.

It is an important site for the Dadheech Brahmins, and, as one of 52 shaktipiths, significant to the Shaktism tradition and to Purana-related scholarship.

Dadhimati is said to be the sister of the Rishi (sage) Dadhichi. The legend says she was born on Magha (Indian month) Shukl 7 (Ratha Saptami) due to the churning of the sky. Dadhimati killed Detya Vikatasur on Magha Shukl 8 (Jaya Ashtami) in Dadhi Sagar. Dadhimati is the Avatar of the goddess Laxmi.

The Kapalapitha Mahatmya identifies goddess Dadhimati with Lakshmi. In chapter 8, Dadhimati is described as residing in Vaikuntha as well as the creator of the universe, and explicitly called Mahalakshmi. The text also describes her as the daughter of the ocean (Kshira Sagara). The text further describes Vishnu as her husband, Atharvan as her father and Dadhichi as her brother.

The temple has the oldest depictions of 'Devi mahamatya', which are even older than the Mahalaxmi temple of Kolhapur, Maharashtra. It has a depiction of Valmiki Ramayana in interiors.
