= Bairathal Kallan =

- village
- Location in Rajasthan, India Bairathal Kallan (India)
- Coordinates: 27.0647257°N 73.3804481°E
- Country: India
- State: Rajasthan
- District: Nagaur

Government
  - Type: Panchayti Raj
  - Body: Gram Panchayat
  - Sarpanch: Mrs. Nirma devi

Languages
  - Official: Hindi
- Time zone: UTC+5:30 (IST)
- PIN: 341025
- ISO 3166 code: RJ-IN
- Vehicle registration: RJ21

Bairathal Kallan is a village panchayat located in the Nagaur district of Rajasthan state, India.

== History ==
The Bairathal Kallan village was established about 700–750 years ago. This village was established by the Nath community; At that time the main saint of the Nath community was Bairaginath, and the village was named after him. There are three villages in Bairathal Kallan Gram Panchayats in India - Bairathal Kallan, Bairathal Khurd, and Jagrampura. Khurd and Kalan are Persian language words which mean small and big respectively. When two villages have the same name they are distinguished by adding the word Kalan means Big or Khurd means Small with the village name.

== Population ==
According to Census-2011 information: With total 656 families residing, Berathal Kalan village has the population of 3523 (of which 1819 are males while 1704 are females).

== Notable places ==
=== Government offices ===
- Panchayat Bhawan : Centre of village Government.
- Post Office
- Patwar Bhawan
- Atal Seva Kendra
- Sahkari Bhawan, Gram Seva Sahkari Samiti

=== Educational institutions ===
- Govt. Senior Secondary School, Bairathal Kallan
- Ronak Public Senior Secondary School
- Modern Public Shikshan Sansthan Sen. Sec. School
