= Nagaur railway station =

Railway station in Rajasthan

Nagaur

General information
- Location: SH 19, Nagaur, Rajasthan; India
- Coordinates: 27.2001°N 73.7235°E
- Elevation: 296 metres (971 ft)
- System: Indian Railways station
- Owner: Indian Railways
- Operator: North Western Railway
- Platforms: 3
- Tracks: 3
- Connections: Auto stand

Construction
- Structure type: Standard (on-ground station)
- Parking: Yes
- Cycle facilities: No

Other information
- Status: Functioning
- Station code: NGO
- Zone(s): North Western Railway Zone
- Division(s): Jodhpur
Location
- Location within Rajasthan Location within India

Nagaur is a major railway station in Jodhpur Mandal (Rajasthan, India). Its code is NGO. The district headquarters station Nagaur consists of three platforms. Platforms 2 and 3 are not well sheltered. At present more than 47 trains halt at this station. It is A grade station based on revenue and public footfalls. There is high demand that some luxury trains like Humsafar Express should make stops at this station. Geographically, Nagaur railway station is a central station of Rajasthan and caters to a massive number of travellers. The station lacks many amenities like air-conditioned waiting rooms, restaurant, extra roof-top shelter, solar-based energy system, automatic escalator, digital / analog clocks (platform 2,3) and digital information board (platform 2,3).

Station category: A grade station.
