= Hariram (yogi) =

Pakistani Hindu saint

Baba Hariram (1867–1947) was a Hindu saint who lived in Sindh.

== Birth and early life ==
He was born on Sindh and developed as a guru and saint of Sindh during 19th Century CE (1867–1947). He developed as baba under the guidance, teachings and blessings of Baba Kriparam. He also followed Bhagat Wadhuram, an illiterate shopkeeper turned 'Baba' and considered as "Trader in Truth" by Baba Hariram.

== Devotees and beliefs ==
Devotees of Baba Hariram are mainly found in Sindh.

- "Baba Hariram was a sadhu of high spirituality at the same time a man of aggressive wordliness"

== Disciples ==
=== Sant Hirdaram Sahib ===
Ramchand, son of Sahajram and Rochalbai of Bhiryan village, Navabshah district, Sindh (now in Pakistan) became a disciple of Baba Hariram and took sanyas and renamed by his guru as Sant Hirdaram Sahib (born 21 September 1906); and he later migrated to India during 1948 and first settled in Pushkar and later in Bairagarh, Bhopal, Madhya Pradesh and Bairagarh is renamed as "Sant Hirdaram Nagar" in 1995 by Government of Madhya Pradesh looking to the various benevolent activities being run with his blessings & inspiration by the charitable organization - Jeev Sewa Sansthan & its sister organizations. Rev. Siddh Bhauji is successor of Paramhans Sant Hirdaram Sahib. Like his Guru, Rev. Siddh Bhauji sought sannyasa and decided to remain Bal Brahmchari. He has been devoting every moment of his life for the welfare of suffering humanity.
