= Khinvsar =

Khinwsar khimsar/ kheenvsar
- town
- Location in Rajasthan, India Khinwsar (India)
- Coordinates: 26.9769°N 73.4008°E
- Country: India
- State: Rajasthan
- District: Nagaur
- 16th century by Rao karmasi the first king of this village: 16th century

Government
  - Type: Panchayati raj (India)
  - Body: Gram panchayat
- Elevation: 280 m (920 ft)

Population (2001)
  - Total: 7,319
- Time zone: UTC+5:30 (IST)

Khinvsar is a town and tehsil headquarters in the Nagaur district of Rajasthan state in India. The town is located on the National Highway No. 62 towards Jodhpur 92 km away and from Nagaur 43 km away. Khimsar Fort (16th century) is the chief tourist attraction of this place. Population of Khinvsar is 7,319 according to census 2001, where male population is 3,821 while female population is 3,498.
