= Degana =

- Town
- Location in Rajasthan, India Degana (India)
- Coordinates: 26.895052°N 74.322166°E
- Country: India
- State: Rajasthan
- District: Nagaur
- Elevation: 353 m (1,158 ft)

Population (2011)
  - Total: 34,315

Languages
  - Official: Hindi
- Time zone: UTC+5:30 (IST)
- PIN: 341503
- Telephone code: 911587
- Vehicle registration: RJ 21
- Nearest city: Ajmer
- Sex ratio: 878/1000 ♂/♀
- Literacy: 65%
- Lok Sabha constituency: Rajsamand
- Vidhan Sabha constituency: Ajay Singh Kilak
- Website: www.facebook.com/degana.raj

Degana is a town, subdivision, and Tehsil headquarters in Nagaur district of Rajasthan, India.

== Demography ==
As of 2011 India census, Degana had a population of 34,315. Males constitute 53% of the population and females 47%. Degana has an average literacy rate of 70%, higher than the national average of 59.5%, male literacy is 75% and female literacy is 51%.

== Geography ==
Degana is located at 26.895052°N 74.322166°E. It has an average elevation of 353 metres (1161 ft).

== See also ==
- List of villages in Degana Tehsil
