= Jayal =

- Town
- Nickname: Jael
- Location in Rajasthan, India Jayal (India)
- Coordinates: 27.2167°N 74.1833°E
- Country: India
- State: Rajasthan
- District: Nagaur

Government
  - Type: Municipal Council
- Elevation: 296 m (971 ft)

Population (2011)
  - Total: 17,000

Languages
  - Official: Hindi
- Time zone: UTC+5:30 (IST)
- Postal code: 341023
- Area code: 911583
- Vehicle registration: RJ21
- Spoken languages: Hindi, Rajasthani,

Jayal is a census town and tehsil headquarters in the Nagaur district of Rajasthan state. The town is located 50 km away from Nagaur. One of the oldest Stone Age civilization contemporary to Bagor and Tilwara.

== Geography ==
Jayal is located at 27.2167°N 74.1833°E. It has an average elevation of 296 metres (974 feet).

== Demographics ==
As of 2001 India census, Jayal had a population of 12,218. Males constitute 6,258 of the population and females 5,960.
