= Nagaur =

- City
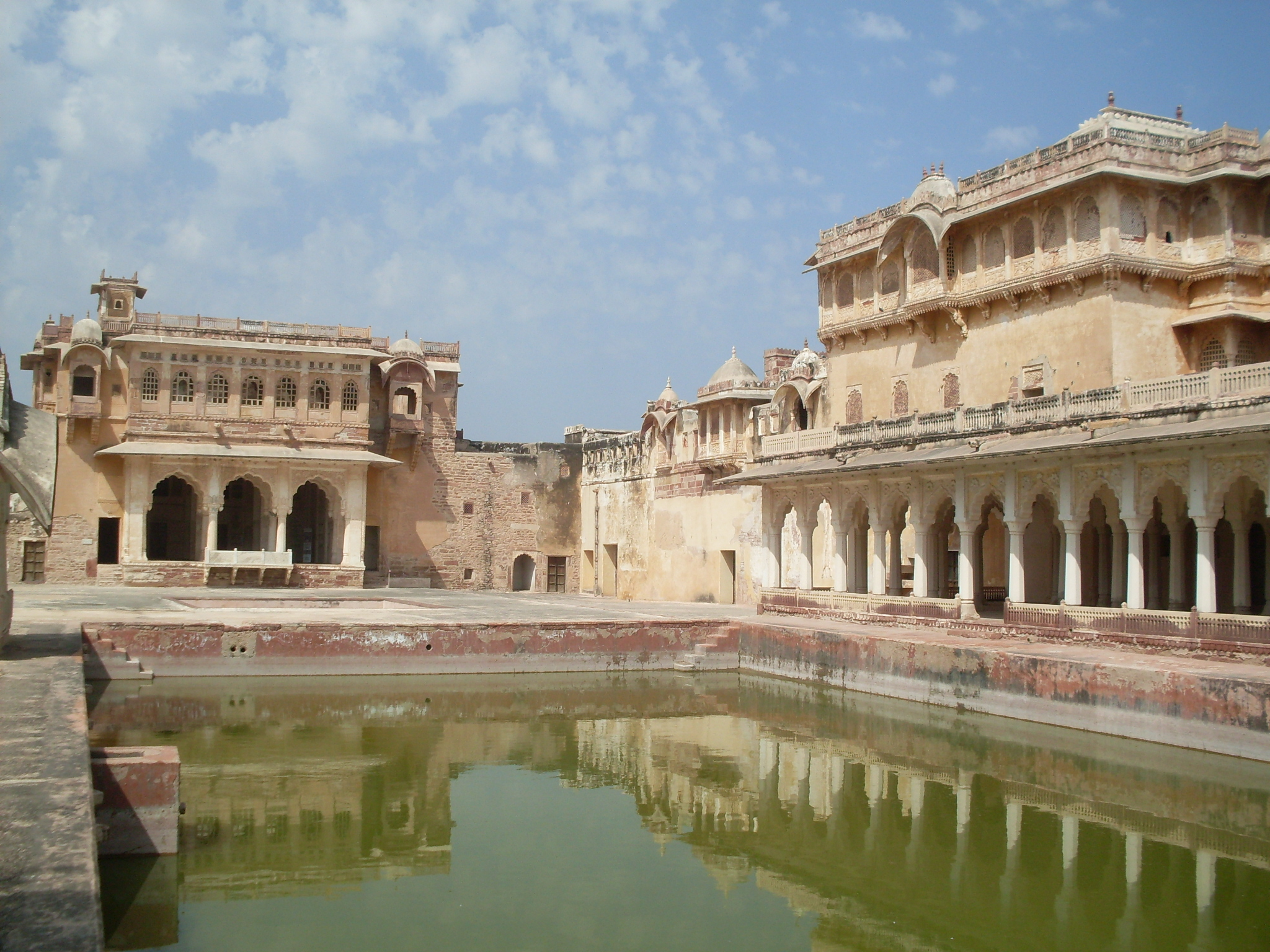
- Nagaur Fort in Nagaur city, Rajasthan, India

- Location in Rajasthan, India
- Coordinates: 27.2°N 73.73°E
- Country: India
- State: Rajasthan
- District: Nagaur
- Founder: Nagvanshi Kshatriya

Government
  - Type: Democracy
  - Chairman, City Council: Meetu Bothra
- Elevation: 302 m (991 ft)

Population (2012)
  - Total: 110,797

Languages
  - Official: Hindi, Rajasthani
  - Local: Marwari

Languages
- Time zone: UTC+5:30 (IST)
- Postal code: 341001
- Vehicle registration: RJ-21
- Website: nagaur.rajasthan.gov.in

Nagaur (also Nagor and Nagore) is a city and municipal council in Nagaur district of the state of Rajasthan in India. It is the administrative headquarters of Nagaur District. The Nagaur city lies about midway between Jodhpur and Bikaner. Nagaur district is located in central region of Rajasthan.

== History ==
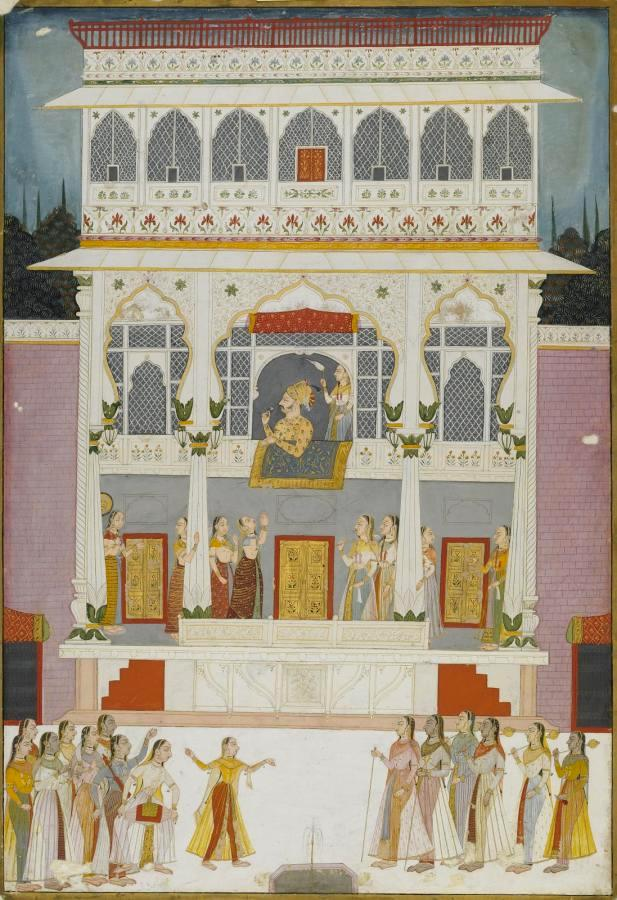
Maharaja Bakht Singh at the Jharokha window of the Bakhat Singh Mahal, Nagaur

Earlier Empire belongs to gaur dynasty rajputs. The Nagaur Fort was built by Maharaja of Parmar Rajputs, and historically important to Kshatriyas of India. Naagvanshi Kshatriya took shelter around Nagaur. The Parmar Rajputs rulers dominated Nagaur for a long period of time. Parmar Rajputs ruler of Nagaur were appreciated by Sisodias of Chittor and Rathore of Jodhpur. The ancient name of the city was Ahichhatrapur.. In the medieval era, the town of Nagaur sat astride trade routes coming north from Gujarat and Sindh and those on the west crossing the Indus from Multan with a dead flat plain all around. The defence of the fort depended on the military and economic power of its rulers. And from the period of the Ghaznavid invasions, Nagaur was under the powerful Chauhan clan. A succession of rulers kept the whole of Jangladesh free from foreign rule down to the reign of Prithviraj Chauhan at the close of the 12th century. That Nagaur town came under the invaders is clear since Balban, before becoming Sultan, was given an estate centered on this desert town. But just as there were petty Hindu chiefs (of numerous castes) in the vast lands between Ajmer and Delhi, it is reasonable to suppose that such landholders were also present in the lands between Ajmer and Nagaur, paying land revenue to the Muslims and probably joining their army.

Another similarity between Ajmer and Nagaur is the early founding of Sufi shrines at both places. One of the earliest Sufis to come to Nagaur was Sultan Tarkin, whose shrine was established during Hindu rule. After Khwaja Moinuddin established the Chishti Sufi order at Ajmer one of his disciples, named Hamiduddin, came to Nagaur. Hamiduddin accommodated some Hindu principles in his teachings—he became a strict vegetarian and lovingly reared a cow in his shrine.

In 1391, during the reign of Násir-ud-dín Muhammad Tughlak, Jalal Khan Khokhar was assigned governor of Nagaur. Between 1405-07, Shams Khan, brother of Muzaffar Shah I founded the Nagaur principality

Following the defeat of combined armies of Shams Khan and the Gujarat Sultanate at the hands of the powerful Rajput ruler Rana Kumbha in 1455, the town and nearby areas subsequently fell under the dominion of the Sisodiya Rajput rulers of Mewar.

During the Mughal reign in the 17th century, Amar Singh Rathore (30 December 1613 – 25 July 1644) was made the emperor's representative (subedar) of Nagaur.

Most of the palatial structures inside the fort were built by Bakht Singh of Marwar. Bakht Singh was made the lord of Nagaur by his elder brother Abhai Singh of Jodhpur. As the lord of Nagaur, Bakht invaded Bikaner and fought Jaipur at the Battle of Gangwana.

In 1755 Jai Appa Sindhia attacked on Nagaur after looting several places in Rajasthan. Jai Appa halted his army near Samas pond of Tausar which was 3.5 Km from Nagaur fort. He surrounded Nagaur fort and cut off food and water supply. Maharaja Vijay Singh ji called the Darbar and asked volunteers to kill Scindia. Gaji Khan Khokhar (Chawata Kallan) and Kan Singh (Dotalai) volunteered and took responsibility to kill Jai Appa Scindia. Both changed their outfit as traders and opened shop near Jai Appaji's army. They observed their activities for two months. On Friday, 25 July 1755 at 11 am, they attacked Jai Appa with daggers and killed him. While fighting, both the loyal soldiers of Jodhpur were martyred. From then on, a common proverb that people still say: "Khokhar bada khuraki; kha gaya appa jaisa daaki" (Khokhar are very voracious, eaten demon like appa). Even after killing of Jai Appa Sindhia, Maratha army continued fighting for few more months near Nagaur but they eventually retreated.

== Climate ==
Nagaur has a dry climate with a hot summer. Sand storms are common in summer. The district's climate is marked by extreme dryness, large variations of temperature & highly irregular rainfall patterns. The maximum temperature recorded in the district is 117F (47.2 °C) with 32F (0 °C) as the lowest recorded temperature. The average temperature of the district is 74 °F (23 °C). The winter season extends from mid-November until the beginning of March. The rainy season is relatively short, extending from July through mid-September. There are ten climatological stations within the district, being within the cities of Nagaur, Khinvsar, Didwana, Merta, Parbatsar, Makarana, Nawa, Jayal, Degana & Ladnun. The average rainfall in the district is 36.16 cm & 59% relative humidity.

== Geography ==
Nagaur is located at 27.2°N 73.73°E. It has an average elevation of 302 metres (990 feet). Nagaur is situated amidst seven districts namely Bikaner, Churu, Sikar, Jaipur, Ajmer, Pali, Jodhpur. Nagaur is the fifth largest district in Rajasthan with a vast terrain spreading over 17,718 km^{2} (6,841 sq mi) Its geographical spread is a good combine of plain, hills, sand mounds and as such it is a part of the great Indian Thar Desert.

== Demographics ==
Religions in Nagaur city
Religion	Percent
Hindus	63.33%
Muslims	33.24%

== Forest, flora and fauna ==
The district of Nagaur is poor in forest resources. The total area under including hills, is reported to be 240.92 km^{2}., which is 1.3 percent of total geographical area of the district. Scanty rainfall & other geographical constraints account for this. The western part of the district is divided of natural vegetation cover except for low herbs & grass which grows on low sand dunes. However, the south-eastern part of the district & part of the northern Tehsil of Ladnun & Didwana have much greater greenery as compared to north-west part of the district. Khejri trees are commonly found in the district. Its leaves are used as fodder. It also gives gum. Apart from commercial value, this tree is considered holy. The tree also plays an important role in checking soil erosion. The other common species found in the district are babul, neem, shishma, peepal, rohira, Kalsi, dhangood, and akara. Rohira & shisham trees provide timber & is used for making furniture. Dhangood is generally used for making cots. A common shrub-phog provides building material from its roots & twigs.

== Tourism ==
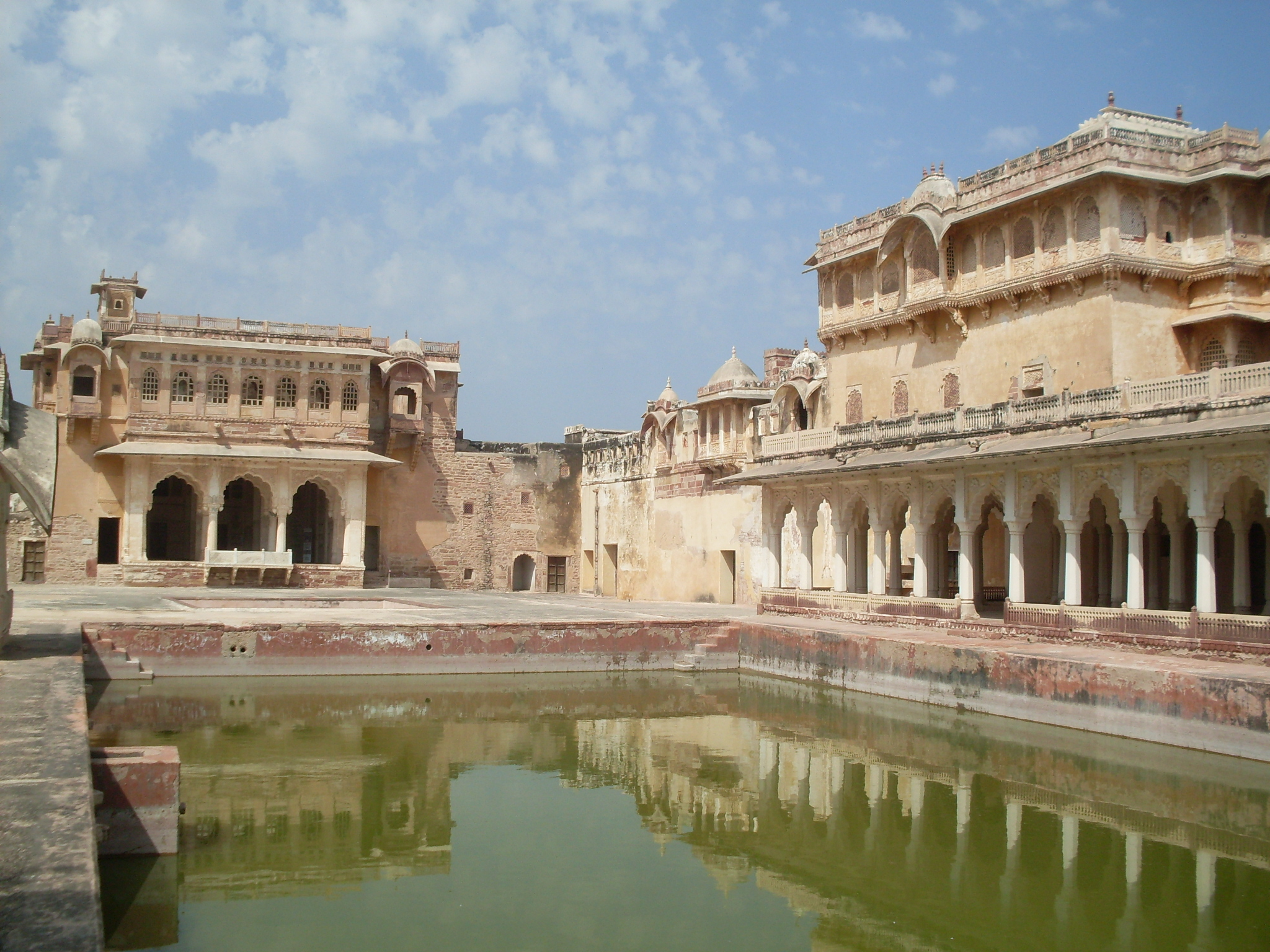
Nagaur Fort

- Nagaur Fort is one of the finest examples of Rajput-Mughal architecture. Built in the early 12th century and repeatedly altered over subsequent centuries, it witnessed many battles. Underwent major renovations in 2007. 90 fountains are now running in the gardens and buildings. The fort's buildings and spaces, both external and internal, serve as venue, stage and home to a Sufi Music Festival.
- Rol, also known as Rol Sharif, is a village in Jayal tehsil of Nagaur district in the Indian state of Rajasthan. The village has many mosques, including Shahi Jama Masjid. There is Jubba Mubarak of Muhammad, which are said to possess holy relic brought by Qazi Hamiduddin Nagauri from Bukhara, Russia. Devotees from various parts of the country gather on urs of Quazi Sahab to celebrate the occasion. There is an annual Urs Mela (Urs Fair) organised in village.
- Ladnun - 10th century's Jain temples are rich with historical attraction. Jain Vishva Bharti University - A centre of Jainism; a school of thought; a centre of spirituality & purification; a society of Ahimsa.

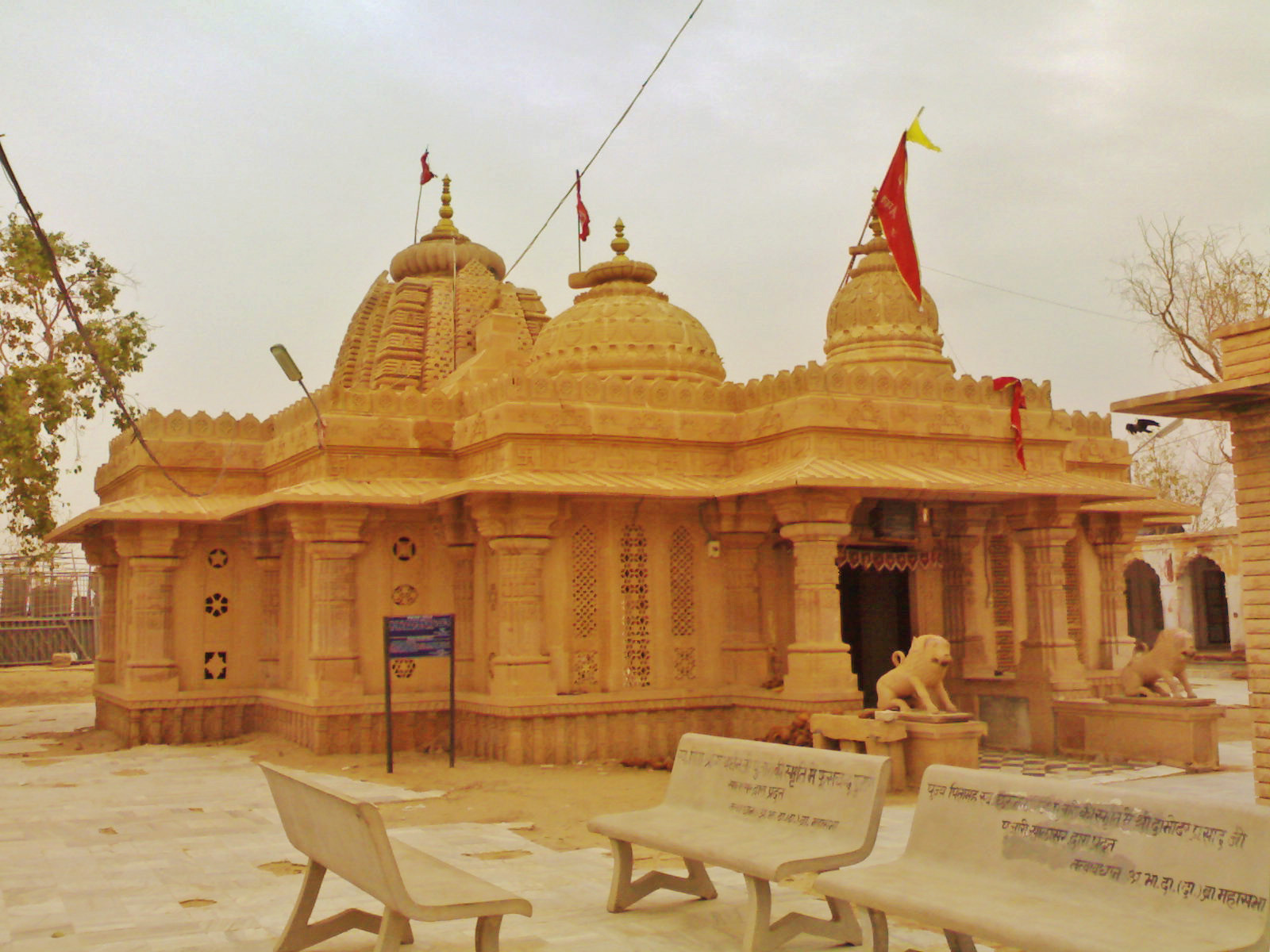
Dadhimati Mata Temple in Nagaur district, Rajasthan.

- Bairathal Kallan - The Bairathal Kallan village was established about 700–750 years ago.
- Khinvsar town - Khimsar Fort - Situated 42 km from Nagaur on the National Highway No. 65 towards Jodhpur; 500-year-old fort in the middle of the Thar Desert; turned into a hotel furnished with modern facilities. Mughal Emperor Aurangzeb used to stay here; Khinvsar town has 25 small temples; black deer roaming in herds are a tourist attraction.
- Jayal- Dadhimati Mata Temple - Also known as Goth-Manglod temple; 40 km from Nagaur; the oldest temple of the district constructed during the Gupta Dynasty (4th Century); Kul Devi of Dadhich Brahmins.
- Merta - Meera Bai Temple - Also known as the Charbhuja temple; 400 years old; evidence how total surrender helps attain godly qualities; how deep faith converts poison to 'Amrit'.
- Merta City (Nagaur) (especially Merta Agricultural Produce Market) holds a prominent place among the most prominent and largest cumin markets of Rajasthan.
- Kuchaman City - Kuchaman Fort - One of the oldest & most inaccessible forts of Rajasthan, situated on top of a straight hill, unique water harvesting system, Jodhpur rulers used to mint their gold & silver currency here. Fort is converted into a hotel.
- Khatu - Khatu's old name was Shatkup (six wells). When Shak rulers came to India then they brought two new wells with them which were called Shakandhu (Stepwell) & Kalandh (Rahat). According to Prathviraj Raso, Khatu's old name was Khatwan. Old Khatu is almost destroyed. Now there are two villages, one is called Bari Khatu & other Chhoti Khatu. On the hillock of Chhoti Khatu a small fort is standing. Fort was built by Prithviraj Chauhan. An old stepwell is located in Chhoti Khatu, known as Phool Bawadi, it is believed that this stepwell was constructed in Gurjara Pratihara period. This stepwell is artistic in its style of architecture.
- Kurki - Kurki is a small village in the Merta Tehsil of Nagaur district. It is the birthplace of the princess and poet, Meera Bai, about 30 km from Merta.
- Kharnal - It is situated on the Nagaur-Jodhpur National Highway near about 15 km from Nagaur. It is the birthplace of Lok Devta Veer Tejaji. It is believed that Kharnal was established by Dhawal Khichi who was in the 5th generation of the Choudhan ruler Gundal Rao Khichi of Jayal state. Veer Tejaji was born in Dholiya Gotra of Jat.
- Untwaliya - It is situated 15 km from Nagaur and 10 km from Alai.
- Jhorda - It is situated on the north of Nagaur about 30 km away. It is the birthplace of the Great Saint Baba Hariram.

== See also ==
- Nagori, a breed of cattle
- Nagori (caste)
- Didwana
- Meethari Marwar
- Gotan
- Lampolai
- Bairathal Kallan
