= Nagaur district =

Coordinates: 27°12′N 73°44′E

- District
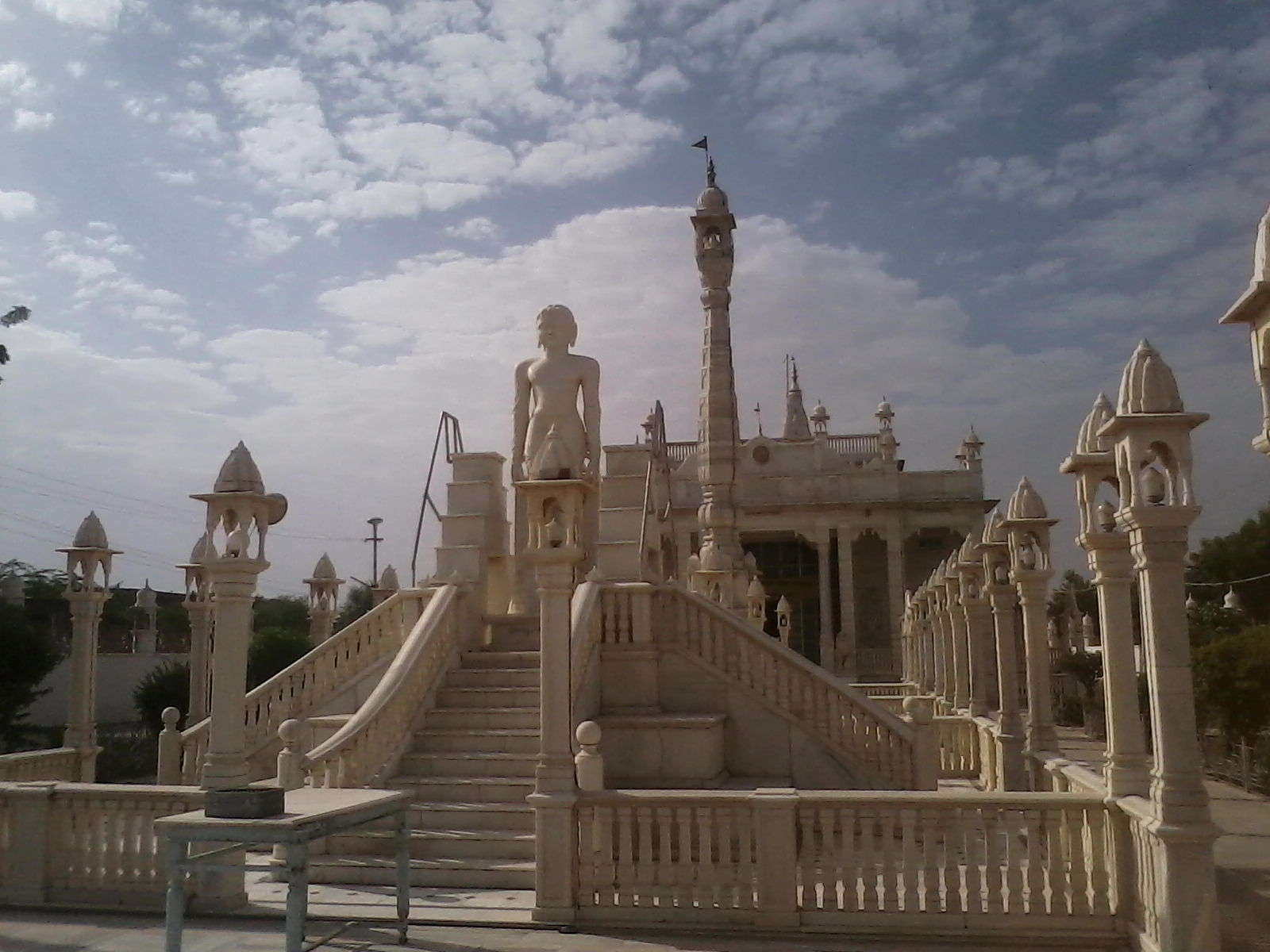
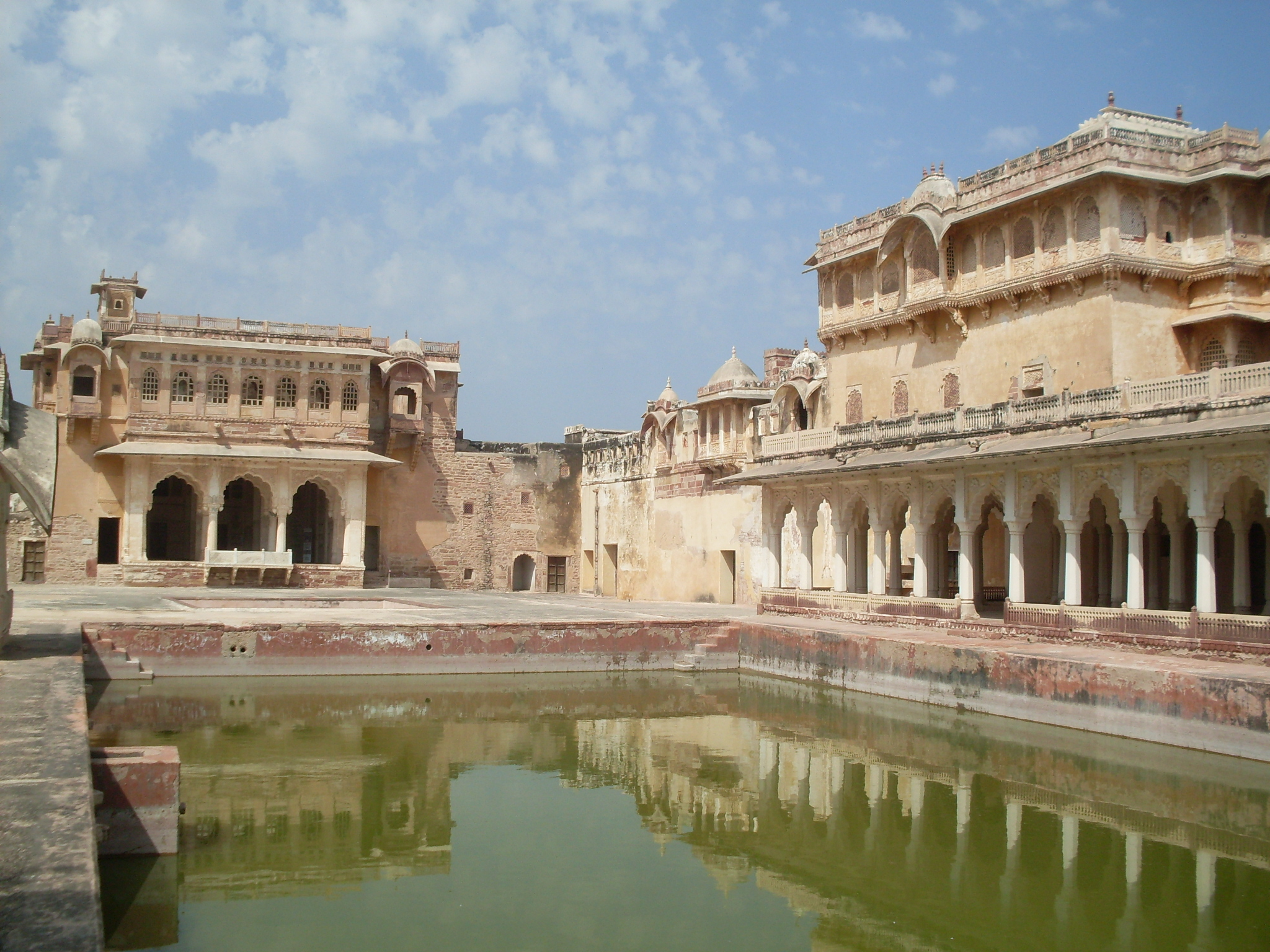
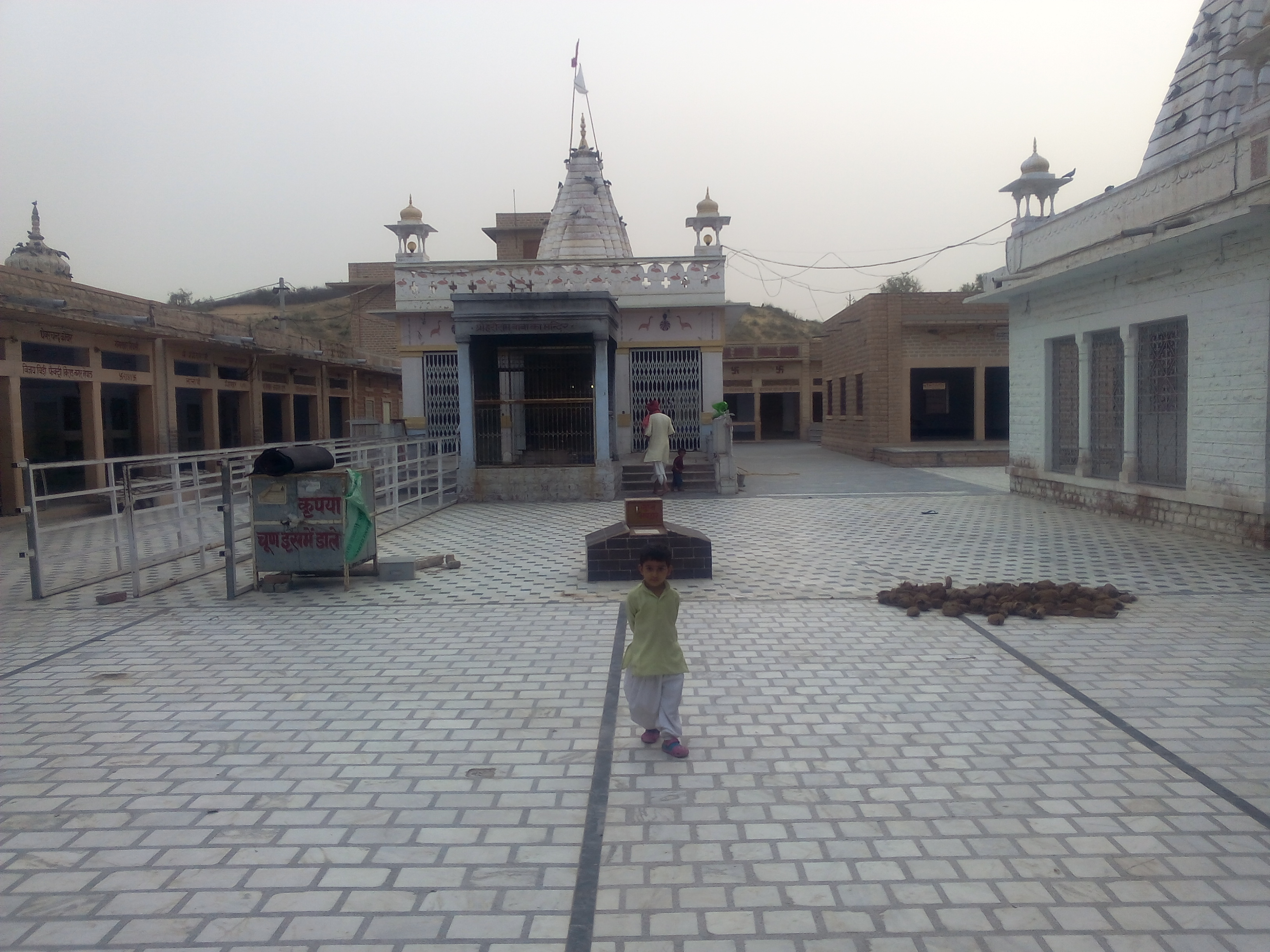
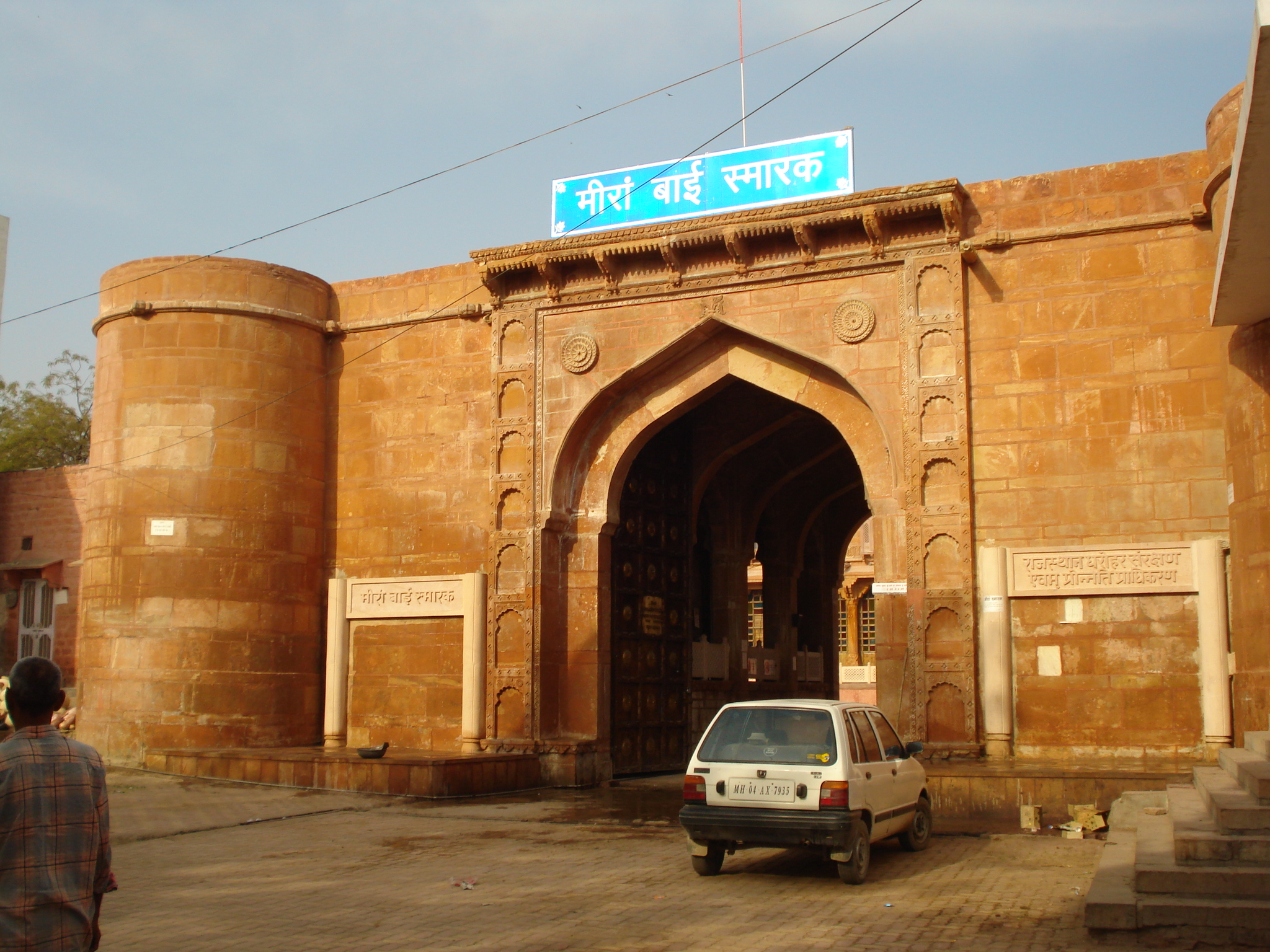
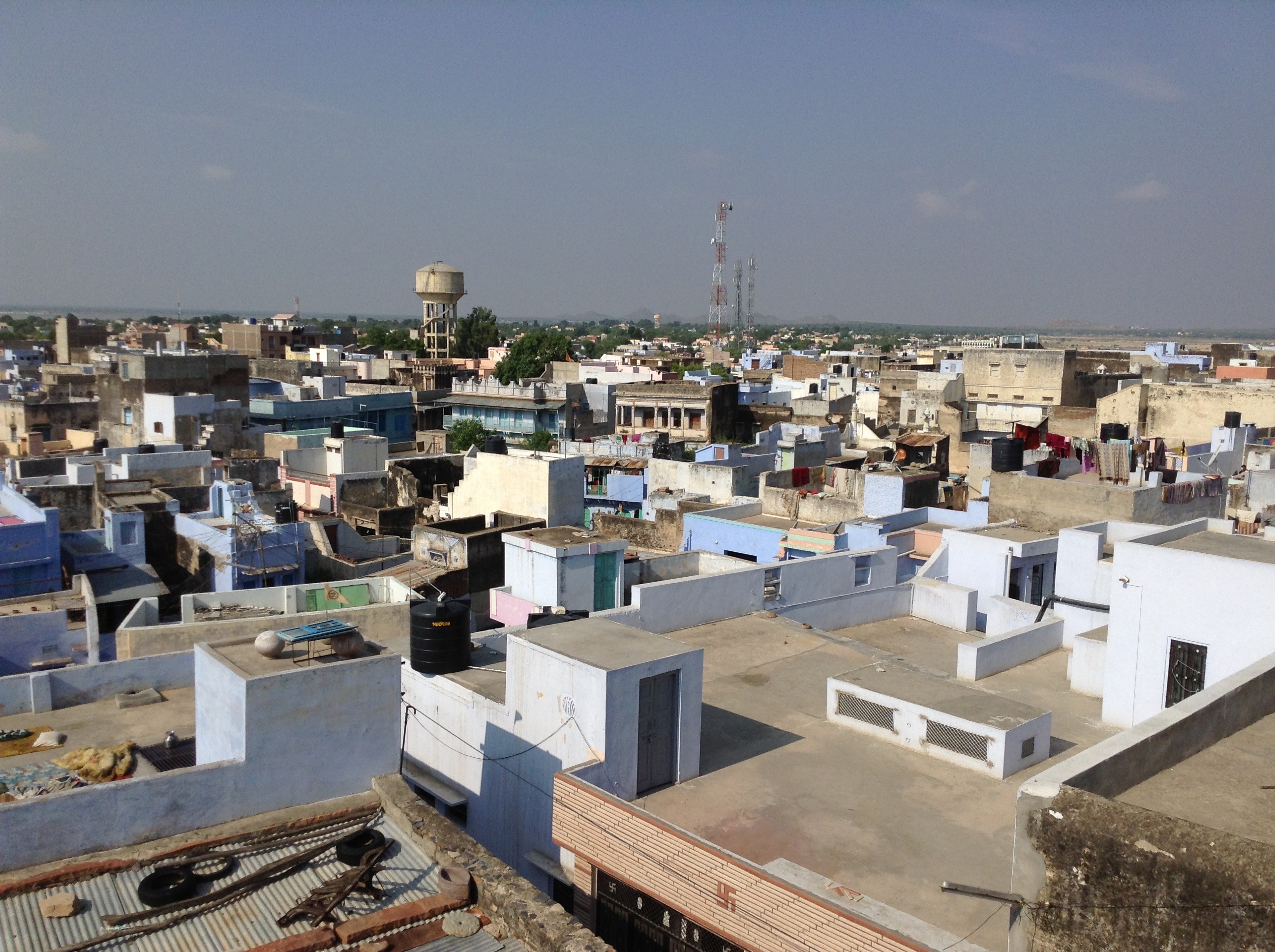
- Clockwise from top-left: Jain Temple in Ladnu, Nagaur Fort, Mirabai Museum at Merta, Skyline of Didwana, Baba Hariram Temple at Jhorda

- Location of Nagaur (Nāgaur) district in Rajasthan
- Country: India
- State: Rajasthan
- Division: Ajmer
- Headquarters: Nagaur
- Tehsils: Nagaur, Khinvsar, Deh, Riyanbari, Jayal, Merta City, Degana

Area
  - Total: 17,718 km^{2} (6,841 sq mi)

Population (2011)
  - Total: 3,307,743
  - Density: 186.69/km^{2} (483.52/sq mi)
- Time zone: UTC+05:30 (IST)
- Website: https://nagaur.rajasthan.gov.in/

Nagaur district is one of the 41 districts of the state of Rajasthan in western India. Panchayati Raj was introduced here. It is the fifth largest district in Rajasthan and the area of the district is 17,718 km^{2} (6,841 sq mi). The city of Nagaur is the district headquarters. Nagaur district is located in central region of Rajasthan.

== Geography ==
Nagaur District is between 26°25' & 27°40' north latitude & 73°.10' & 75°.15' east longitude. The district is bounded by Bikaner District to the northwest, Churu District to the north, Sikar District to the northeast, Jaipur District to the east, Ajmer District to the southeast, Pali District to the south, and Jodhpur District to the southwest and west. The district lies in the Marwar region of Rajasthan, in the Northwestern thorn scrub forests belt surrounding the Thar Desert. The Aravalli Range extends across the southeastern portion of the district, and the saline Sambhar Lake, India's largest salt lake and Rajasthan's largest lake, lies at the southwestern corner of the district, straddling the boundary with Jaipur District. Kheduli is a historic palace where pupil of Khawaja Moiniddin Chisti Hamiduddin Nagouri lived for 10 years and located on the railway line of Jaipur-Jodhpur.

- Luni River

The only river that flows through the Nagaur district is the Luni which is of ephemeral nature. This river originates from the Aravallis, near Pushkar in Ajmer district and follows a WSW course into the Kutch. The river Luni enters into Nagaur district near Ladpura (about 2.5 to 3 km (1.6 to 1.9 mi) southwest of Ladpura) and drains the villages of Alniawas, Jhintia etc. finally crossing the village Kekind to enter into the Jaitaran area of Pali district. Although it has a number of tributaries all but one join it from the south. None of these drain any water into the main river but for a few days during the monsoon. The wide beds of these rivers have been considerably filled by alluvial and aeolicin sediments and in places they have almost been choked by aeolian sand. The river Luni also acts as a barrier against the eastward spread of aeolian sand.

- Soil

The study area is greatly influenced by strong winds and the soil is wind-modified to a varied degree. The effect of arid condition is reflected in the lack of horizonatioi of the soils. The soil material appears to have been formed from mixed sources of igneous, metamorphic and vindhyan systems. The following soil profile is a typical pedon which occupies more than 70 percent of the area.

- Dunes of Nagaur

The main sandy tract of the area lies to the west of the Luni river. The northern and western parts of the district have scattered dunes, these being mostly parabolic, longitudinal barchans and obstructed dunes, oriented in NNE-SSW to NE-SW directions.

- Vegetation

The vegetation consists of a sparse cover of thorny woodland with distinct variations in different topographical areas. The principal trees found on sand dunes are Prosopis cineraria, Acacia senegal, Tecomella undulata, Gymnosporia and Aerva.

Physiographically the district is marked by a low and gentle relief interspersed with the isolated hills and knolls of the Aravallis. The major part of the district is characterised by stabilised sand dunes. Climatologically^the area experiences a semi-arid climate with sparse thorn and scrub type of vegetational cover.

== Tehsils ==
These are Nagaur, Deh, Khinvsar, Jayal, Merta City, Degana, Mundwa, Sanjoo, Riyan badi All of these are Sub-divisions also. There are 15 blocks and 1607 villages in the district. Charbhujanath temple and Meera bai mandir situated at mertacity which is known as the birthplace of bhakta Shiromani Meerabai.

== Demographics ==
Historical population
Year	Pop.	±% p.a.
1901	524,217	—
1911	559,111	+0.65%
1921	487,462	−1.36%
1931	568,434	+1.55%
1941	656,377	+1.45%
1951	763,829	+1.53%
1961	934,948	+2.04%
1971	1,262,157	+3.05%
1981	1,628,669	+2.58%
1991	2,144,810	+2.79%
2001	2,775,058	+2.61%
2011	3,307,743	+1.77%

Religions in Nagaur district (2011)
Religion	Percent
Hinduism	85.66%
Islam	13.74%
Other or not stated	0.60%

According to the 2011 census Nagaur district has a population of 3,307,743, roughly equal to the nation of Uruguay or the US state of Connecticut. This gives it a ranking of 102nd in India (out of a total of 640). The district has a population density of 187 inhabitants per square kilometre (480/sq mi) . Its population growth rate over the decade 2001-2011 was 19.25%. Nagaur has a sex ratio of 950 females for every 1000 males, and a literacy rate of 64.08%. 19.26% of the population lives in urban areas. Scheduled Castes and Scheduled Tribes make up 21.16% and 0.31% of the population respectively.

Languages of Nagaur district (2011)
1. Rajasthani (81.1%)
2. Marwari (14.9%)
3. Hindi (2.05%)
4. Urdu (1.71%)
5. Others (0.21%)

At the time of the 2011 census, 81.09% of the population spoke Rajasthani, 14.94% Marwari, 2.05% Hindi and 1.71% Urdu as their first language.

== Tourism ==
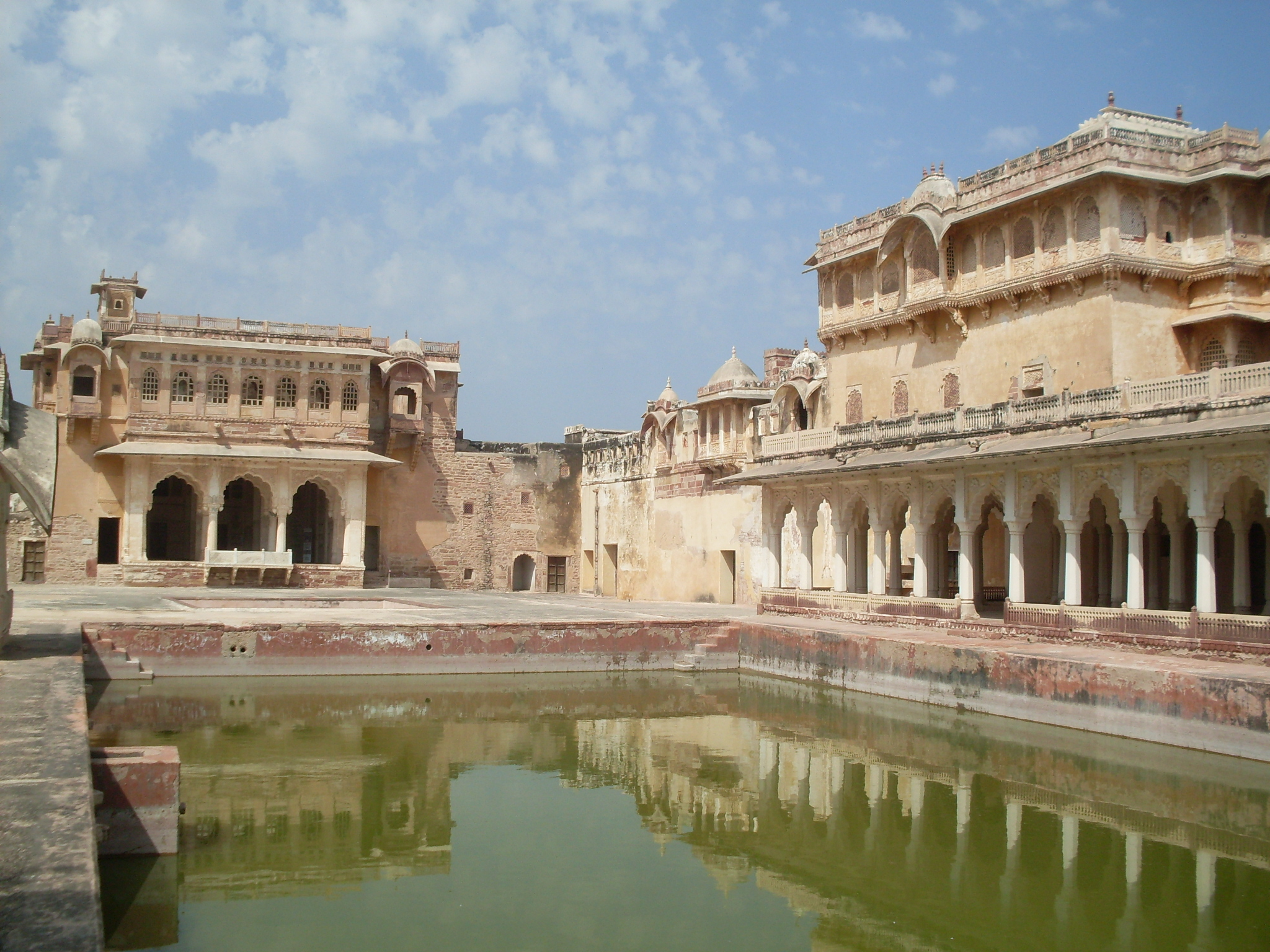
Nagaur Fort

- Nagaur Fort was one of the first Muslim strongholds in northern India and one of the finest examples of early Rajput architecture. Built in the early 12th century and repeatedly altered over subsequent centuries, it witnessed many battles. Underwent major renovations in 2007. 90 fountains are now running in the gardens and buildings. The fort's buildings and spaces, both external and internal, serve as venue, stage and home to a Sufi Music Festival.
- Rol, also known as Rol Sharif, is a village in Jayal tehsil of Nagaur district in the Indian state of Rajasthan. The village has many mosques, including Shahi Jama Masjid . There is Jubba Mubarak of Muhammad, which are said to possess holy relics brought by Qazi Hamiduddin Nagauri from Bukhara. Devotees from various parts of the country gather on urs of Quazi Sahab to celebrate the occasion. There is an annual Urs Mela (Urs Fair) organised in village.
- Ladnu - tenth century's Jain temples are rich with historical attraction. Jain Vishva Bharti University - A centre of Jainism; a school of thought; a centre of spirituality & purification; a society of Ahimsa.

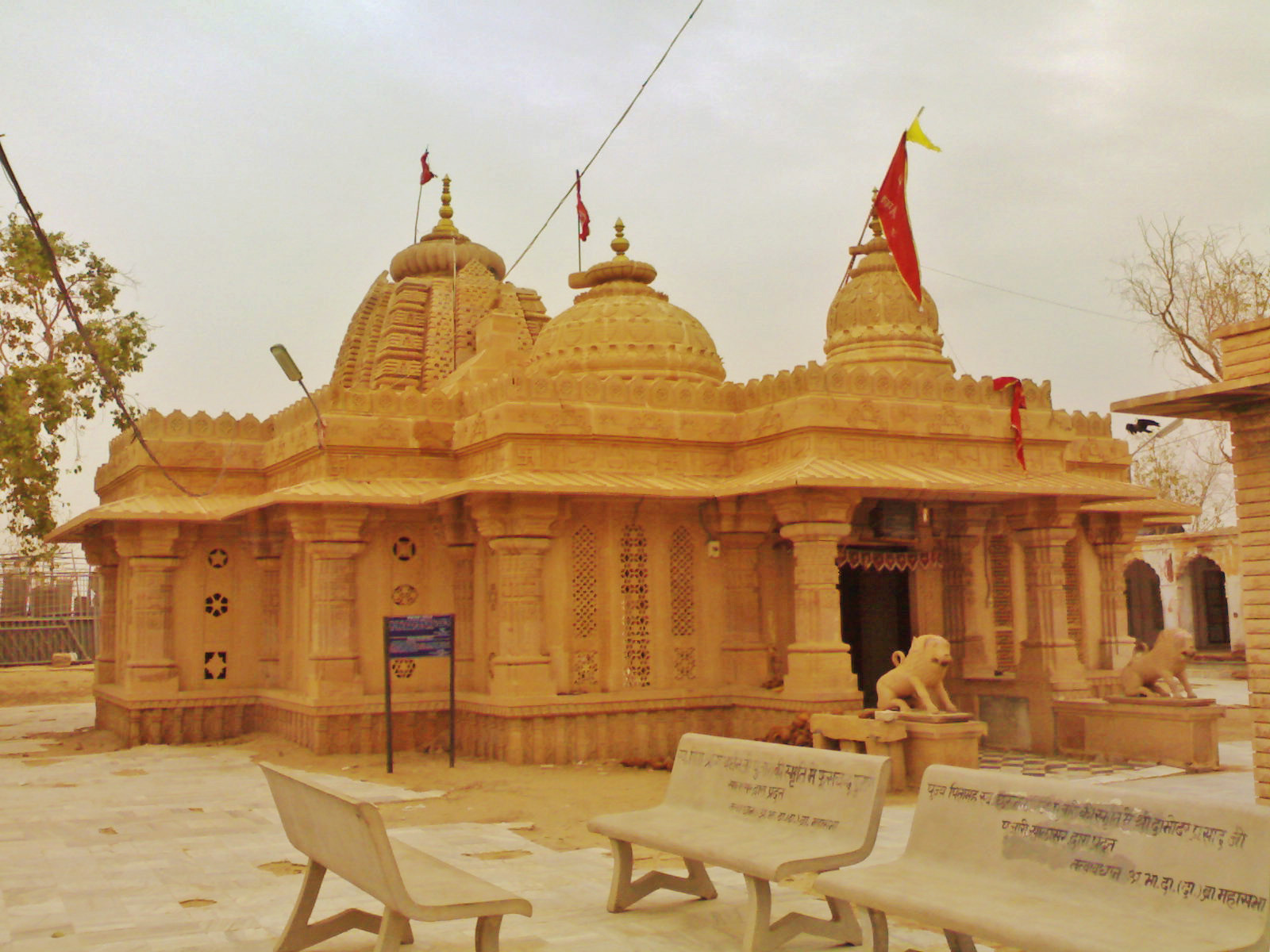
Dadhimati Mata Temple in Nagaur district, Rajasthan.

- Bairathal Kallan - The Bairathal Kallan village was established about 700–750 years ago.
- Khinvsar town - Khimsar Fort - 42 km (26 mi) from Nagaur on the National Highway No. 65 towards Jodhpur; 500-year-old fort in the middle of the Thar Desert, turned into a hotel furnished with modern facilities. Khinvsar town has 25 small temples, black deer roaming in herds are a tourist attraction.
- Deh- Dadhimati Mata Temple - Also known as Goth-Manglod temple, 40 km (25 mi) from Nagaur; the oldest temple of the district constructed during the Gupta Dynasty (4th Century); Kul Devi of Dadhich Brahmins.
- There is also a famous temple of Maa Kunjal in Deh town.
- Meera Bai Temple - Also known as the Charbhuja temple; 400 years old temple.
- Merta City - has the best agricultural market of Rajasthan.
- Kuchaman City - Kuchaman Fort - One of the oldest & most inaccessible forts of Rajasthan, this fort is on top of a straight hill. Jodhpur rulers used to mint their gold and silver currency here. It affords views of the city and has been converted into a hotel.
- Khatu - Khatu's old name was Shatkup (six wells). When Shak rulers came to India then they brought two new wells with them which were called Shakandhu (Stepwell) & Kalandh (Rahat). According to Prathviraj Raso, Khatu's old name was Khatwan. Old Khatu is almost destroyed. Now there are two villages, one is called Bari Khatu & other Choti khatu. On the hillock of badi Khatu a small fort is standing. Fort was built by Prithviraj Chauhan. An old stepwell is located in Chhoti Khatu, known as Phool Bawadi, it is believed that this stepwell was constructed in Gurjara Pratihara period.
- Kurki - Kurki is a small village in the Merta City Tehsil of Nagaur district. It is the birthplace of the princess and poet, Meera Bai, about 30 km (19 mi) from Merta City.
- Kharnal - It is on the Nagaur-Jodhpur National Highway near about 15 km (9.3 mi) from Nagaur. It is the birthplace of Lok Devta Veer Tejaji. It is believed that Kharnal was established by Dhawal Khichi who was in the fifth generation of the Choudhan ruler Gundal Rao Khichi of Jayal state.
- Untwaliya - It is 15 km (9.3 mi) from Nagaur and 10 km (6.2 mi) from Alai.
- Jhorda - It is on the north of Nagaur about 30 km (19 mi)away. It is the birthplace of the Saint Baba Hariram.
- Dhananwan- it is a village in Makrana tehsil. Here is famous Bisram das baba temple.
