= List of villages in Sikar district =

This is a list of villages in Sikar district, a district of Rajasthan state in northern India. Sikar is the administrative headquarters of the district.

== A–D ==
- Alakhpura Bogan
- Balaran
- Basni
- Bau Dham
- Beri
- Bhoodha Ka Bas
- Bhopatpura
- Bhuma
- Bidasar
- Bidsar
- Birania
- Birodi Bari
- Birodi Chhoti
- Chandpura
- Churimiyan

== D–H ==
- Dantla
- Darunda
- Deorala
- Dhandhan
- Dhani Pujariyon Ki
- Fadanpura
- Ganeshwar
- Garinda
- Gothra Bhukaran
- Harsawa
- Harsh

== J–L ==
- Jeenmata
- Jhadhewa
- Karanga Chhota
- Katrathal
- Khatikan Pyau
- Khatushyamji
- Khinwasar
- Khood
- Khuri Bari
- Khuri Chhoti
- Kishor Pura
- Kudan
- Ladhana
- Lampua

== M–P ==
- Mandela Chhota
- Mandholi
- Mangloona
- Maonda
- Mirzwas
- Moondwara
- Mundru
- Nabipura
- Nagardas
- Nangal Abhaypura
- Nangal Bhim
- Neemera
- Nethwa
- Nimakidhani
- Nimera
- Pachar
- Palthana
- Peepli
- Piprali
- Puran Badi

== R–V ==
- Ramjipura
- Ramshisar
- Roru
- Rosawa
- Salamsingh Ki Dhani
- Sankhu
- Sanwali
- Sewad Bari
- Sewad Chhoti
- Singodara
- Singodari
- Sujawas
- Sutot
- Tajsar
- Thikariya
- Tihawali
- Vijaipura
