= Singodari =

Village in Rajasthan, India

- village
- Location in Rajasthan, India Singodari (India)
- Coordinates: 27.62°N 75.15°E
- Country: India
- State: Rajasthan
- District: Sikar

Government
  - Type: Sarpanch
  - Body: Panchayat

Area
  - Total: 269.57 ha (666.1 acres)

Population (2011)
  - Total: 588
  - Density: 218/km^{2} (565/sq mi)
- Time zone: UTC+5.30
- PIN: 332311
- Village Code: 081358
- Sex Ratio: 1000/921 ♂/♀
- Website: sikar.rajasthan.gov.in

Singodari (सिंगोदडी) is a village in the Laxmangarh administrative region of Sikar district of Indian state Rajasthan.

== About Singodari ==
It is situated 5km away from sub-district headquarter Lachhmangarh (tehsildar office) and 33km away from district headquarter Sikar. As per 2009 stats, Singodara is the gram panchayat of Singodari village. According to Census 2011, the location code or village code of Singodari is 081358. The village spans a total geographical area of 269.57 hectares, and the pincode of the locality is 332311. Lachhmangarh is nearest town to Singodari village for all major economic activities, which is approximately 5km away.

== Population ==
588 (Males: 306, Females: 282) (As per Census-2011)

== Nearest villages ==
- Peepli
- Antroli
- Basni
- Singodara
- Dholas
- Shyorana Ka Bas
- Narodara

== See also ==
- Alakhpura Bogan
- Balaran
- Bau Dham
- Bhoodha Ka Bas
- Bhuma
- Beedasar
- Bidsar
- Birodi Bari
- Birodi Chhoti
- Churimiyan
- Jhadhewa
- Khuri Bari
- Khuri Chhoti
- Roru
- Sankhu
