= Singodara =

Village in Rajasthan, India

- village
- Location in Rajasthan, India Singodara (India)
- Coordinates: 27.62°N 75.15°E
- Country: India
- State: Rajasthan
- District: Sikar

Government
  - Type: Sarpanch
  - Body: Panchayat

Area
  - Total: 480 ha (1,200 acres)

Population (2011)
  - Total: 1,400
  - Density: 290/km^{2} (760/sq mi)
- Time zone: UTC+5.30
- PIN: 332311
- Village Code: 01674600
- Sex Ratio: 1000/947 ♂/♀
- Website: sikar.rajasthan.gov.in

Singodara is a village in the Laxmangarh administrative region of Sikar district of Indian state Rajasthan.

== Population ==
Singodara is a census village in Sikar district in Rajasthan. As per Census-2011 data, Singodara village has a total population of 1400 and total administration of over 265 houses.(Out of which 716 are males while 684 are females).Singodara has 184 children, of which 97 are boys and 87 are girls. Scheduled castes number 311 (22.21%) for males 608 (43.43%) and females 297 (21.21%).

== Singodara Gram Panchayat ==
As per the Constitution of India and Panchayati Raj Act, Singodara village is administered by Sarpanch (village head) Mahesh Kumar Dheva (2015 to 2020), (2020 to present) who is the representative of the village.

=== Villages in Singodara Gram Panchayat ===
- Basni
- Peepli
- Singodara
- Singodari

== Literacy ==
Singodara village has higher literacy rate than Rajasthan. As per Census 2011 report, Singodara village had literacy rate of 71.30% compared to 66.11% of Rajasthan. Male literacy in Singodara is 85.46% while female literacy rate is 56.62%.

Singodara has following educational facilities:

- 1 Education Facility
- 1 Primary School
- 1 Upper Primary School

== Nearest Villages ==
- Singodari - 1 km
- Basni - 2 km
- Pipli - 3 km
- Dholas - 3 km
- Antaroli - 3 km
- Bairas - 4 km
- Manasi - 4 km
- Fadanpura - 5 km

== See also ==
- Alakhpura Bogan
- Balaran
- Bau Dham
- Bhoodha Ka Bas
- Bhuma
- Beedasar
- Bidsar
- Birodi Bari
- Birodi Chhoti
- Churimiyan
- Jhadhewa
- Khuri Bari
- Khuri Chhoti
- Roru
- Sankhu
