= Surera =

- village
- Location in Rajasthan, India Surera (India)
- Coordinates: 27.183°N 75.131°E
- Country: India
- State: Rajasthan
- District: Sikar
- Elevation: 409 m (1,342 ft)

Population (2011)
  - Total: 3,570

Languages
  - Official: Hindi
- Time zone: UTC+5:30 (IST)
- Postal code: 332742

Surera is a village in the Dantaramgarh Tehsil, Sikar District of Rajasthan, India. It is famous for a fort established by Thakur Moti singh shekhawat in estimate 1695. And also known for the mytred Jatan Singh Shekhawat in 1962 china war

It falls within the Jaipur Division. It is located 54 kilometres (34 mi) south of the district headquarters, Sikar; 22 kilometres (14 mi) from Dantaramgarh; and 86 kilometres (53 mi) from the state capital, Jaipur.
