= Darunda =

Village in Rajasthan, India

Darunda Dadunda
- Village
- Village in India Darunda (India)
- Coordinates: 28.09°N 74.89°E
- Country: India
- State: Rajasthan
- District: Sikar
- Tehsil: Fatherpur

Government
  - Member of Legislative Assembly: Hakam Ali Khan
- Elevation: 331 m (1,086 ft)

Population (2011)
  - Total: 1,870

Languages
  - Official: Hindi
- Time zone: UTC+5:30 (IST)
- PIN: 332302
- Telephone code: 01571
- Vehicle registration: RJ-23

Darunda is a village located in the Sikar district of Shekhawati region, in Rajasthan state, India. Darunda is within the Fatehpur Tehsil. Sand dunes of the Thar Desert can be seen in Darunda. As of 2011, the village had a total population of 1870.

== Geography ==
Darunda is located at 28°09' North, 74°89' East. The total geographical area of the village is 3600 Bigha (2,252 acres or 911 hectares), and has a forest area of 55.8 hectare. It is located at a distance of 12 km from Fatehpur. Darunda is near to the historical village of Fadanpura, Goras, and Nagardas. The natural climatic conditions in the village are harsh. The temperature ranges from sub-zero in the winter to above 45 °C during summer. Darunda is situated in the Thar Desert area with a rainfall of 500 mm during monsoon season.

== Demographics ==
As per the census of 2011, the population was 1870, of whom 952 were male and 918 were female with literacy rate of 78.9%. The village has a diverse population of different castes, such as Jat, Rajputs, Brahmans, Harijans, Naik, Jangir, Kazi and Mian. Majority of the population depends on the rainwater for the agriculture; its main crops are Bajra, Mung, Guar, Chawla, Wheat, and Mustard. Three temples in the village and oldest among them is of "Shree Bhanwar Singh Medi" situated at the top of the sand dunes. Other temples are Karni Mata temple, Thakur Ji temple, and Goga Medi.
