= Dhandhan =

Village in Rajasthan, India

- Village
- Village in India Dhandhan (India)
- Coordinates: 28.09°N 74.89°E
- Country: India
- State: Rajasthan
- District: Sikar
- Tehsil: Fatherpur

Government
  - Member of Legislative Assembly: Hakam Ali Khan
- Elevation: 331 m (1,086 ft)

Population (2011)
  - Total: 3,271

Languages
  - Official: Hindi
- Time zone: UTC+5:30 (IST)
- PIN: 332302
- Telephone code: 01571
- Vehicle registration: RJ-23

Dhandhan is a village located in the Sikar district of Shekhawati region, in Rajasthan state, India. Dhandhan is within the Fatehpur Tehsil. The village had a total population of 3271.

== Geography ==
Dhandhan is located at 27°62' North, 75°15' East. The total geographical area of the village is 8013 Bigha (2,029 acres or 821 hectares). It is located at a distance of 19 km from Fatehpur. Dhandhan is near to the historical village of Jandwa , Ramsisar, Bagas, and Nagardas. The temperature ranges from sub-zero in the winter to above 44°C during the summer.

== Demographics ==
As per the census of 2011, the population was 3271, of whom 1633 were male and 1638 were female with literacy rate of 70.38%.

- Dhandhan has 418 children, 231 boys and 187 girls.
- Scheduled caste counts for 400 (12.23%) males constitute 196 (5.99%) of the population and females 204 (6.24%).

== Employment ==
According to a census 2011 report, 1315 people of the total population are employed. The workforce is 723 male, 592 female with 876 (66.62%) of all workers being employed full-time, this includes 590 males and 286 females. 394 males and 265 females are considered as the main cultivators with the help of 15 male and 5 female agricultural labor. 439 people are reported to work for a marginal period of time in the year.
