= Harsawa =

- Village
- Tecomella undulata tree in Harsawa village

- Location in Rajasthan, India
- Coordinates: 27.9°N 74.97°E
- Country: India
- State: Rajasthan
- District: Sikar
- Elevation: 332 m (1,089 ft)

Population (2001)
  - Total: 1,695

Languages
  - Official: Hindi
- Time zone: UTC+5:30 (IST)
- PIN: 332301
- Telephone code: 01571
- Vehicle registration: RJ-23

Harsawa is a village located in the Sikar district of Shekhawati region, in Rajasthan state, India. Harsawa is within the Fatehpur Tehsil, 8 km south along National Highway-11 from Fatehpur town. Sand dunes of the Thar Desert can be seen from Harsawa. As of 2001, the village had a total population of 1695.

== Geography ==
Harsawa is located at 27°55' North, 74°59' East. The total geographical area of the village is 4000 bigha (1,600 acres or 650 hectares). National Highway-11, from Bikaner to Jaipur, passes through Harsawa, as does the railway line from Bikaner to Jaipur. Harsawa is near to the historical village of Garinda.

== Demographics ==
As of the census of 2001, the population was 1695, of whom 829 were male and 866 were female. Literacy in the village is at 81.17%. All the villagers belong to the Hindu religion, and about ninety percent are of the Jat caste. castes include Rajputs, Brahmans, Swami, Harijans, Naik and Jangir. There is one temple of Hanumanji, one temple of the Goddess Mawali and one than (a sacred place) of Gogaji.
