= Badalwas =

Badalwas Badalwas city
- village
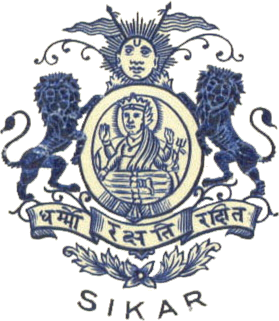

- Location in Rajasthan, India Badalwas (India)
- Coordinates: 27.4647°N 75.0836°E
- Country: India
- State: Rajasthan
- Founder: Thakur Ajit Singh Shekhawat

Government
  - Type: rural

Area
  - Total: 60 km^{2} (23 sq mi)

Population
  - Total: 4,000 approx.

Languages
  - Official: Hindi Marwadi
- Time zone: UTC+5:30 (IST)
- PIN: 332023
- ISO 3166 code: RJ-IN
- Vehicle registration: RJ23

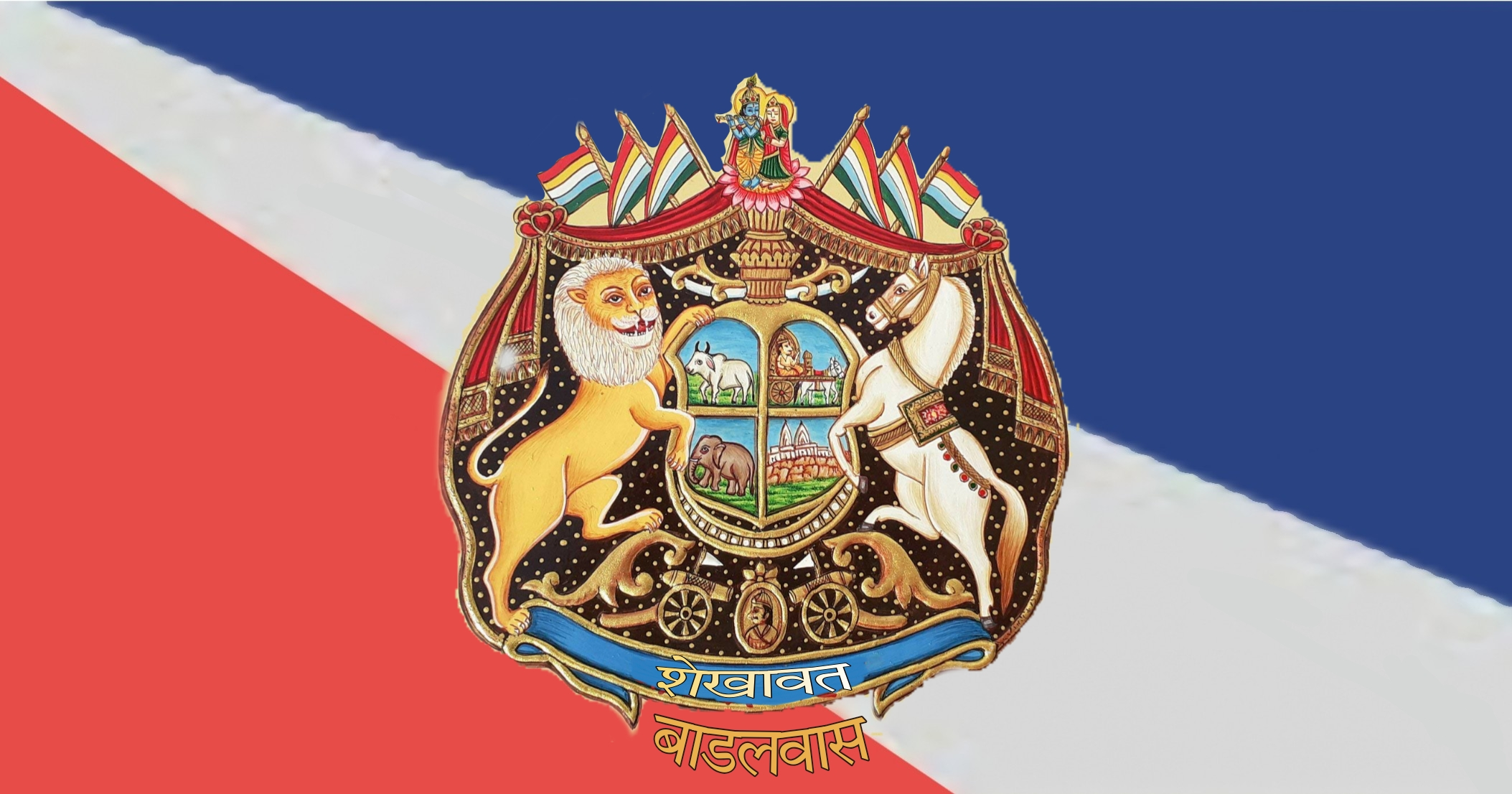

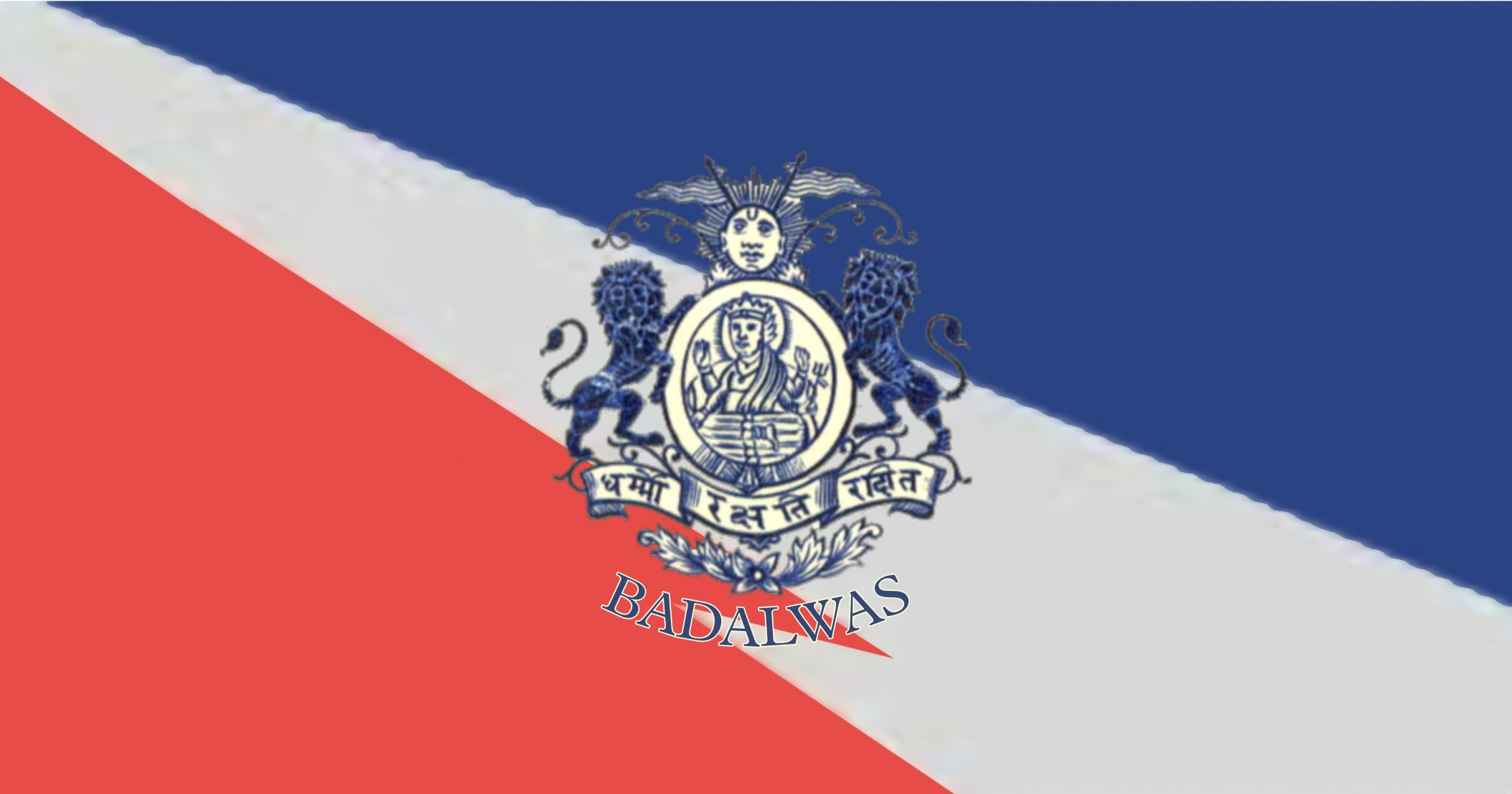

Badalwas is a village in Sikar tehsil of Sikar district in Rajasthan, India. It is situated 18 kilometres from Sikar. This is an old historical village founded 600 years ago.

== Old mansions ==
- Thakur Ranjeet Singh mansion - Jeevraj singh shekhawat
- thakur Deep Singh Mansion
- rao ji ka kotadi

== Popular places ==
- Raghunathji ka Mandir, Badalwas
- Shahid Amarchand Jhunjhar ji temple, Badalwas
- Karni Mata Mandir jalya
- Shivsnakar Mahadev ka mandir
- Shree Shati Mata
- Mawdi Mata Ji, Badalwas
- Baba Ramdevji Temple, Bus stand Badalwas
- Shree krani mata Temple, Badalwas
- Gorana, Badalwas

== Population data ==
The total number of families is 700. In Badalwas village population of children with age 0-18 is 446 which makes up 13.73% of total population of village. Average Sex Ratio of Badalwas village is 947 which is higher than Rajasthan state average of 928. Child Sex Ratio for the Badalwas as per census is 828, lower than Rajasthan average of 888.population data 2011
