= Pachar, Sikar =

Gram Panchayat in Rajasthan, India

Pachar
- Gram Panchayat
- Location within Rajasthan Location within India
- Coordinates: 27°14′47″N 75°22′18″E
- Country: India
- State: Rajasthan
- District: Sikar
- Tehsil: Danta Ramgarh

Government
  - Body: Gram panchayat
  - Sarpanch: Rahul Kumar Kumawat

Area
  - Total: 1,476.22 ha (3,647.8 acres)

Population (2011)
  - Total: 7,256
  - Density: 491.5/km^{2} (1,273/sq mi)
- Time zone: UTC+5:30 (IST)
- PIN: 332710

Pachar is a village and Gram Panchayat in Sikar district in Rajasthan, India. Pachar has a total population of 7,256 peoples according to Census 2011. Pachar 75 km away from district headquarter Sikar.

Also Indian politician Rajpal Singh Shekhawat belong to Pachar, Sikar.
