= Basni, Laxmangarh =

Village in Rajasthan, India

Basni
- village
- Location in Rajasthan, India Basni (India)
- Coordinates: 27.62°N 75.15°E
- Country: India
- State: Rajasthan
- District: Sikar

Government
  - Type: Sarpanch
  - Body: Panchayat

Area
  - Total: 633 ha (1,560 acres)

Population (2011)
  - Total: 1,321
  - Density: 209/km^{2} (541/sq mi)

Languages
- Time zone: UTC+5.30
- PIN: 332311
- Telephone code: 91-1573
- ISO 3166 code: RJ-IN
- Vehicle registration: RJ-23
- Sex Ratio: 1000/947 ♂/♀
- Website: sikar.rajasthan.gov.in

Basni (बासनी, बासणी) is a village in the Laxmangarh administrative region of Sikar district of Indian state Rajasthan.

== Place ==
It is located 5 km from the sub-district headquarter Lachhmangarh and 33 km from the district headquarter Sikar. As per 2009 data, Singodhada is the gram panchayat of Basni village. The total geographical area of the village is 633.22 hectares. The total population of Basni is 1,321. There are about 232 houses in Basni village. The pin code of Basni village is 332311.

== Population ==
1321 (Males: 652, Females: 669) (As per Census-2011)

== About Basni ==
When it comes to administration, Basni village is administered by a Sarpanch who is elected representative of the village by local elections. Currently the Sarpanch of the village is Mahesh Kumar Dheva, As per 2019 data, Basni village falls under Laxmangarh Assembly constituency and Sikar Parliamentary constituency. Laxmangarh is the nearest town to Basni for all major economic activities, which is around 5 km away.

== Nearest villages ==
- Beras (Biras) - 1 kilometer
- Singodara - 2 km
- Rinu - 3 km
- Manasi (Manasi) - 3 km
- Antaroli - 5 km
- Peepli - 5 km

== See also ==
- Alakhpura Bogan
- Balaran
