= Khuri =

Khuri may refer:

== Places ==
- Khuri, Iran, a village in Kerman Province, Iran
- Khuri Bari, a village in Sikar district in Rajasthan state in India
- Khuri Chhoti, a village in Sikar district in Rajasthan state in India
- Khuri Chhoti, a village in Jaipur Division in Rajasthan state in India

== People ==
- Elizabeth Khuri, co-founder of social website Goodreads
- Fadlo R. Khuri, Former chair at Emory University School of Medicine
- Fuad Khuri, Lebanese anthropologist
- Philip Khuri Hitti, Historian and professor at Harvard University
- Yusuf Al-Khuri, ancient translator and mathematician

== Others ==
- Khuri language, one of the Central Iranian varieties of Iran

== See also ==
- Khouri, a surname
