= Ladhana =

- village
- Country: India
- State: Rajasthan
- District: Sikar

Languages
  - Official: Hindi
- Time zone: UTC+5:30 (IST)
- ISO 3166 code: RJ-IN

Ladhana is a village in Danta Ramgarh tehsil in Sikar district in Rajasthan, India. As of 2001 census the population of the village is 7714, out of which 1410 are S.C. and 227 are ST tribes.
