= Neemera =

Neemera Neemeda
- village
- Interactive map of Neemera
- Coordinates: 27.457°N 75.206°E
- Country: India
- State: Rajasthan
- District: Sikar

Population (2009)
  - Total: 4,359

Languages
  - Official: Hindi
- Time zone: UTC+5:30 (IST)
- PIN: 332406
- Telephone code: 0091-1576
- ISO 3166 code: RJ-IN
- Vehicle registration: Rj-23-
- Nearest city: Sikar
- Literacy: 40%%
- Lok Sabha constituency: Sikar
- Avg. summer temperature: 44–45 °C (111–113 °F)
- Avg. winter temperature: 10–5 °C (50–41 °F)

Neemera is a village in Sikar district of Rajasthan, India. It is 27 km from Sikar town in south.

According to the 2011 census it had a population of 96 living in 195 households.

There is a temple dedicated to the Hindu divinity Laxmi Narayan.
