= Kishor Pura =

Kishor Pura Kishorpura-Patan
- Villages
- Location in Rajasthan, India Kishor Pura (India)
- Coordinates: 27.8151°N 75.9351°E
- Country: India
- State: Rajasthan
- District: Sikar
- Block: Neem-Ka-Thana
- Gram Panchayat: Doonga Ki Nangal
- Founder: Thakur PrithviSingh Tanwar

Languages
  - Official: Hindi
- Time zone: UTC+5:30 (IST)
- ISO 3166 code: RJ-IN
- Vehicle registration: RJ-
- Nearest city: Jaipur
- Lok Sabha constituency: Kotputli

Kishor Pura is a village in Sikar district of Rajasthan State, India. It is located 74 km east of district headquarters Sikar and 106 km from the state capital Jaipur. It comes under the Doonga Ki Nangal gram panchayat, in Neem-Ka-Thana block. The village is a part of Torawati state and founded by Thakur PrithviSingh Tanwar son of Rao FatehSingh of Patan, Rajasthan in 1688 A.D.(V.S.1745).
