= Puran Badi =

- Village
- Location in Rajasthan, India Puran Badi (India)
- Coordinates: 27.4892°N 75.1161°E
- Country: India
- State: Rajasthan
- District: Sikar
- Founder: Puraram Bhadhadara

Area
  - Total: 8.512 km^{2} (3.287 sq mi)

Population (2011)
  - Total: 2,591
  - Density: 304.4/km^{2} (788.4/sq mi)

Languages
  - Official: Hindi
- Time zone: UTC+5:30 (IST)
- PIN: 332021
- Vehicle registration: RJ 23

Puran Badi is a village in the Dhod Panchayat Samitii in the Sikar District of Rajasthan region in India. It is 12 kilometers southwest of Sikar. Puran Badi village is older than Sikar City.

== History ==
Puran Badi was founded by Puraram ji Bhadhadara (Brahmin).

Puraram ji laid the foundation stone of Dungari Balaji and Puran Badi village in Kartik Badi Teej 1121(Vikram Samvat) Balaji temple found

== Education ==
There are three government schools in the village: a secondary school and two primary schools. There is a general hospital and an internet room in Puran Badi.

• Tatya Tope in Puran Badi

Tatya Tope, the great freedom fighter associated with the Indian freedom struggle, also once stayed with his soldiers in Puran Badi village for 15 days. The people of Puran Badi village made arrangements for accommodation and food for Tatya Tope and his soldiers. It is said that when the British got information about Tatya Tope's stay, Tatya Tope had to hide his weapons in the pond of Puran Badi.

• Sri Dungari Balaji Temple

Shri Dungari Balaji Temple was established by Puraram Ji Bhadhadara in Kartik Badi Teej 1121 Vikram Samvat. This temple is older than the famous Salasar Balaji. The people of Puran Badi do not use the stones from the mountain of Sri Dungri Balaji.

•Hanuman Sagar

Hanuman Sagar is a historical pond near Shri Dungari Balaji Temple. In ancient times, this pond was the source of drinking water for the people of Puran Badi. The water in Hanuman Sagar comes from small rivers of Harsh Parvat and it is said that till date Hanuman Sagar has never gone dry.

== Demographics ==
Puran Badi, a village within the Dhod Panchayat Samiti, exhibits demographics characteristic of many rural communities in the region. The population is primarily engaged in agriculture and related activities, with traditional practices still playing an integral role in daily life. Over time, gradual improvements in educational infrastructure have led to increased literacy rates, particularly among the younger generation. The village’s social structure reflects a blend of long-standing traditions and evolving aspirations, where family ties and community bonds remain strong even as new opportunities emerge. Local festivities, cultural events, and community gatherings further reinforce these close-knit relationships.

The age distribution in Puran Badi is relatively balanced, with a significant proportion of residents under the age of 30—a factor that promises future growth and dynamism for the local economy. While traditional occupations continue to dominate, there is a noticeable trend toward diversification, as some inhabitants pursue education and migrate to nearby urban centers in search of better prospects. Gender ratios are gradually improving, thanks in part to increased emphasis on female education and healthcare. For a more detailed statistical insight into the village’s demographic profile, you can refer to the official Census of India data available at Census of India.

The total population of the village was estimated in 2011 as 2591, comprising 1451 males and 1140 females.
