= Lampua =

- village
- Interactive map of Lampua
- Coordinates: 27°22′17″N 75°28′56″E
- Country: India
- State: Rajasthan
- District: Sikar

Languages
  - Official: Hindi
- Time zone: UTC+5:30 (IST)
- Postal code: 332404

Lampua or Lampuwa is a village in tehsil Sri Madhopur of Sikar district in Rajasthan, India. It is situated 8 km west of Ringas, on the Ringas-Khatu Road.

== Demography ==
As of 2011, the village has population of 2910 of which 1506 are males while 1404 are females. Its total population (in 2001) was 2,333. There were 550 families. Out of them, Bajiya is the only Jat gotras with total 450 families. As per Census-2011 statistics, Lapuwa village has the total population of 2910 (of which 1506 are males while 1404 are females).[1] Other castes dwelling in the village with number of families are Brahman (1), Harijan (50), Meena (30), Nai (20), Bania (1) came in 1890 named as Phoolchand Gupta.
