= Salamsingh Ki Dhani =

Salamsingh ki dhani
- village
- Country: India
- State: Rajasthan
- District: Sikar

Languages
  - Official: Hindi
- Time zone: UTC+5:30 (IST)
- ISO 3166 code: RJ-IN

Salamsingh Ki Dhani is a small village in the outskirts of the Sikar city in the Indian state of Rajasthan. Half of the village now comes under Sikar municipal corporation. It is surrounded by villages gokulpura, chandpura, dujod and sanwali.
