= Kudan, Rajasthan =

Kudan Koodan
- Village
- Location in Rajasthan, India Kudan (India)
- Coordinates: 27.75°N 75.16°E
- Country: India
- State: Rajasthan
- District: Sikar

Population (2011)
  - Total: 3,929

Languages
  - Official: Hindi
  - Spoken(Colloquial): Shekhawati
- Time zone: UTC+5:30 (IST)
- PIN: 332031
- Telephone code: 91-1572
- ISO 3166 code: RJ-IN
- Vehicle registration: RJ-23
- Nearest city: Sikar
- Avg. summer temperature: 35–40 °C (95–104 °F)
- Avg. winter temperature: 15–18 °C (59–64 °F)

Kudan is a village in Sikar district in Rajasthan, India. It is relatively a well-developed village which is connected by roads and with all forms of modern communication facilities. The majority population of the village belongs to Jat community with Sunda and Maharia representing largest and second largest gotras respectively in terms of numbers. Moreover, other castes are Harijans and Nayaks (Dalits), Rajputs (Shekhawat), Kumhar (Kumawat), Brahmins, Khati, Nai (caste), Jat (Kajla) and Jat (Phogawat). There is also a marginal population of Muslims as well.

== Education ==
Kudan has several educational institutions. There is a Govt. Higher Secondary School, Shaheed Major Surendra Badsara Aadarsh Rajkiya Uchch Madhyamik Vidyalaya (named after Saheed Maj Surendra Badsara, Sena Medal) where Science (Mathematics), Arts and Commerce subjects are available at 11th and 12th standards. The school was established in 1951 and was a major centre of high school education for decades for the nearby villages. Also, there is a Govt. Secondary Girls School and a very old Govt. Primary School (which has been upgraded into an Upper Primary School a few years ago). There are a couple of Private Schools also which provide education in both Hindi and English mediums. Along with a graduate college exclusively for girls, the village has three teacher training colleges. All the schools in the village are affiliated to Board of Secondary Education, Rajasthan.

Kudan is among the educated villages in Sikar district, a significant credit for this may be given to the village elders who owing to their foresightedness recognised the value of education and the impact that it could bring to the socio-economic dynamics of the village.

Kudan is also among equals for serving the nation. Saheed Maj Surendra Badsara, SM(Sena Medal) and Shaheed Subhas Sunda belong to this same village along with other people in uniform who are serving the Nation in Indian Army, Indian Navy, Indian Air Force, Paramilitary forces of India and Police Service on various ranks, positions and designations.
