= Peepli, Laxmangarh =

Village in Rajasthan, India

Peepli
- village
- Location in Rajasthan, India Peepli (India)
- Coordinates: 27.62°N 75.15°E
- Country: India
- State: Rajasthan
- District: Sikar

Government
  - Type: Sarpanch
  - Body: Panchayat

Area
  - Total: 527.89 ha (1,304.4 acres)

Population (2011)
  - Total: 1,229
  - Density: 232.8/km^{2} (603.0/sq mi)
- Time zone: UTC+5.30
- PIN: 332311
- Village Code: 081354
- Sex Ratio: 1000/1011 ♂/♀
- Website: sikar.rajasthan.gov.in

Peepli (पीपली) is a village in the Laxmangarh administrative region of Sikar district of Indian state Rajasthan.

== About Peepli ==
It is situated 10km away from sub-district headquarter Lachhmangarh (tehsildar office) and 38km away from district headquarter Sikar. As per 2009 stats, Singodara is the gram panchayat of Peepli village. According to Census 2011, the location code or village code of Peepli is 081354. The village spans a total geographical area of 527.89 hectares, and the pincode of the locality is 332401. Lachhmangarh is nearest town to Peepli village for all major economic activities, which is approximately 10km away.

== Population ==
1,229 (Males: 611, Females: 618) (As per Census-2011)

== See also ==
- Alakhpura Bogan
- Balaran
- Bau Dham
- Bhoodha Ka Bas
- Bhuma
