= Gokulpura =

Village in Rajasthan, India

- Village
- Location within Rajasthan Location within India
- Coordinates: 27°34′43.644″N 75°10′55.654″E

Government
  - Type: Federal republic
  - Body: Gram panchayat

Area
  - Total: 1,029 ha (2,540 acres)
- Elevation: 450 m (1,480 ft)

Population
  - Total: 4,109

Languages
  - Official: Hindi, Rajasthani, English
- Time zone: UTC+5:30 (IST)
- PIN: 332021
- Telephone code: 91 - 01572
- Vehicle registration: RJ-23

Gokulpura is a village in Sikar Tehsil of Sikar district, in the Indian state of Rajasthan, 8.2 km from the district Sikar and 110 km from Jaipur.

== Demographics ==
In 2011, the village had a total population of 4,109 people, 2,114 of them men and 1,995 women.

== Literacy ==
In 2011, the literacy rate was 74.23%. The male literacy rate was 87.69%, while the female literacy rate was 60.29%.
