= Sujawas =

- village
- Location in Sikar, Rajasthan, India
- Coordinates: 27.528958°N 75.263599°E
- Country: India
- State: Rajasthan
- District: Sikar
- Elevation 1476.36: 528 m (1,732 ft)

Population (2001)
  - Total: 503

Language
  - Official: Shekhawati
- Time zone: UTC+5:30 (IST)
- PIN: 332403
- Telephone code: 91-1575
- Vehicle registration: RJ-23

Sujawas is a village in Piprali tehsil, Sikar district, Rajasthan state, India. It belongs to Jaipur Division . It is located 18 kilometres (11 mi) east from its district headquarters at Sikar and 102 kilometres (63 mi) from the state capital at Jaipur.

== History ==
Nawal Singh of Sikar constructed the Sujawas Fort in 1687, and the town grew around it.

== Geography ==
Sujawas has an average elevation of 222 metres (728 ft).

The area is arid ridden and the main source of their income is agriculture. The agriculture is based on the monsoon rains. The average rainfall in the area is also very less. Certain farmers are now constructing tubewells in the area for irrigation purposes.

Nearby villages include Sherpura, Masudpura, Trilokpura, Ranoli, and Rewasa. Sikar tehsil lies to the west, Kawnat tehsil to the east, and Ranoli tehsil towards the north. Danta Ramgarh tehsil lies southwards.

Sujawas' Pin code is 332403 and postal head office is Danta Ramgarh (Sikar).

== Demographics ==
As of the 2001 census of India, Sujawas had a population of 385. Males constituted 52% of the population and females 48%. The average literacy rate was 64%, higher than the national average of 60.5%: male literacy was 76%, and female literacy was 51%. 17% of the population was under 6 years of age.

== Sujawas Fort ==
The most imposing building in this town is its small fortress which looms over the well laid out township on its west side. Nawal Singh, the Raja of Sujawas, conquered the fort in the early 17th century after Kan Singh dudu besieged the prosperous town. The fort is built upon scattered pieces of huge rocks.
