= Nethwa =

- Village
- Location in Rajasthan, India Nethwa (India)
- Coordinates: 28.14°N 74.97°E
- Country: India
- State: Rajasthan
- District: Sikar
- Tehsil: Ramgarh, Sikar

Government
  - Sarpanch: Nirmala Devi
  - Member of Legislative Assembly: Nand kishore Mahriya
- Elevation: 327 m (1,073 ft)

Population (2011)
  - Total: 2,250

Languages
  - Official: Hindi
  - Regional: Rajasthani or Shekhawati

Religion
  - Religious groups: Hindu
- Time zone: UTC+5:30 (IST)
- PIN: 331024
- Telephone code: 91-1572
- Vehicle registration: RJ-23
- Literacy: 70.25%
- Distance from Jaipur: 194 kilometres (121 mi) (land)
- Distance from Sikar: 75 kilometres (47 mi) (land)
- Climate: Köppen climate classification (Köppen)
- Avg. annual temperature: 20-22 °C
- Avg. summer temperature: 44-46 °C
- Avg. winter temperature: 2-6 °C

Nethwa is a village in the Sikar district of Indian state Rajasthan. It is part of the Shekhawati region.

== Geography ==
Nethwa is located at 28.14°N 74.97°E. It has an average elevation of 327 meters (1,073 ft).

== Economy ==
The main occupation of the villagers is agriculture. Many people also work in government, and some people work in private industry.

== Education ==
There are two schools in Nethwa: Government Secondary School and Karni Bal Mandir (KBM) Senior Secondary School, which is a private school.
