= Dantla, Rajasthan =

Village in Rajasthan, India

Dantla
- Village
- Interactive map of Dantla
- Country: India
- State: Rajasthan
- District: SIkar
- Tehsil: Danta Ramgarh

Dantla is a tiny village located in the Danta Ramgarh Tehsil in the district of SIkar in the state of Rajasthan. The village comes under the division of Jaipur. The village was in the news when all hopes were lost as most of the surface water was found draining out. The answer of this problem was in channelizing the drainage line to feed existing ponds and wells. The renovation of the ponds was quick and the outcome benefited over 15000 villagers. The water table was revitalized and hand pumps and wells of six villages near Dantla now have enough water to meet the daily needs of villagers.

== Water conservation project ==
The surface of the village showed zero water and in order to ensure that every drop of water was conserved, the NGO - Social Action for Rural Advancement (SARA), with the support of Anandana – has successfully implemented the project.

== Coca Cola support ==
Anandana, which is a Coca-Cola India Foundation, has made enormous capacities for the storage of water. It also focused on the rejuvenation of both surface water bodies and water table in the areas where water was scarce. The initiative was aimed to empower people, especially women, by improving their standard of living.

== Demographic ==
It comes under Dantla Panchayath. It is located 31 km towards South from District headquarters Sikar, 6 km from Danta, and 88 km from the state capital Jaipur. As per the Census of 2011, the village Census Location Code Number of 2001 is 01713000 and Census Location Code Number of 2011 is 081806. The village is spread in the area of 1225.6 hectares in which total population was 1835 in which number of households are 256. The village has 1 pre-primary school, 2 primary schools, 1 middle school and 1 secondary school.

== Nearby villages ==
The nearby villages are -

- Raipur, Rajasthan
- Mohammadpur, Rajasthan
- Mudar aur Nisrin Ka Gaav
- Nangal Baola
- Nangal Santokara
- Nangali Ojha
- Pehal
- Ranoth
- Rasgan, Rajasthan
- Shahpur, Rajasthan
- Shital Pur
- Sukhman Heri
