= Lothoo Nitharwal =

Lothoo Singh Nitharwal
- Born: 1804; Ringas, Sikar, Rajasthan
- Died: 1855
- Other names: Lothoo Jat; Lothoo Singh; Lothoo Ram; Loth; Lothan; Lot; Lotia; Lohat
- Occupation: Fighter against British rule
- Known for: Advocacy against the East India Company, Promotion of democracy, Fighting exploitation by jagirdars, Contributions to Indian freedom movement

Lothoo Singh Nitharwal (1804–1855) was a Jat fighter against British rule from what is now Rajasthan, India. He wanted to overturn the role of the East India Company in India, establish democracy and also free people from exploitation by jagirdars.

Nitharwal is referred to by numerous other names, including Lothoo Jat, Lothoo Singh, Lothoo Ram, Loth, Lothan, Lot, Lotia, and Lohat. Lothu Jat was killed by Rajputs who were then friends of British East India company.
