= Sanwali =

- Town
- Location in Rajasthan, India Sanwali (India)
- Coordinates: 27.569113°N 75.156054°E
- Country: India
- State: Rajasthan
- District: Sikar
- Elevation: 486 m (1,594 ft)

Languages
  - Official: Hindi
- Time zone: UTC+5:30 (IST)
- PIN: 332021
- Telephone code: 01572

Sanwali is a small town in Gram Panchayet Chandpura located in Sikar district of Rajasthan, India, 3 km from Sikar. The native language of Sanwali, spoken by most inhabitants, is Hindi. Marwari language is also spoken.

The nearest railway station is Sikar Junction railway station. The nearest airport is Jaipur International Airport.
