= Dhani Pujariyon Ki =

Town in Rajasthan, India

Dhani pujariyon ki is a small town located at 27.649 North latitude, 75.670 East longitude (27°38'56.4"N 75°40'12.0"E) and the Elevation is 1460 feet.

Postal Address - Post Chala, Tehsil Neemkathana, District Sikar, Rajasthan (India) PIN - 332706.

The population of the town is about 160.

== Residence ==
Khichars are residing there. Khichar is a gotra of the caste Jat.
