= Tajsar =

Taaysar Tajsar
- village
- Location in Rajasthan, India Taaysar (India)
- Coordinates: 28.020564°N 75.005246°E
- Country: India
- State: Rajasthan
- District: Sikar

Area
  - Total: 8 km^{2} (3.1 sq mi)

Population (2012)
  - Total: 3,500
  - Density: 440/km^{2} (1,100/sq mi)

Languages
  - Official: Hindi
- Time zone: UTC+5:30 (IST)
- PIN: 332301
- ISO 3166 code: RJ-IN
- Vehicle registration: RJ23
- Nearest city: Fatehpur, Rajasthan

Tajsar is a village in Fatehpur tehsil of Sikar district in Rajasthan, India.
