= Jeenmata =

Rajasthan

Jeen Mata
- Village
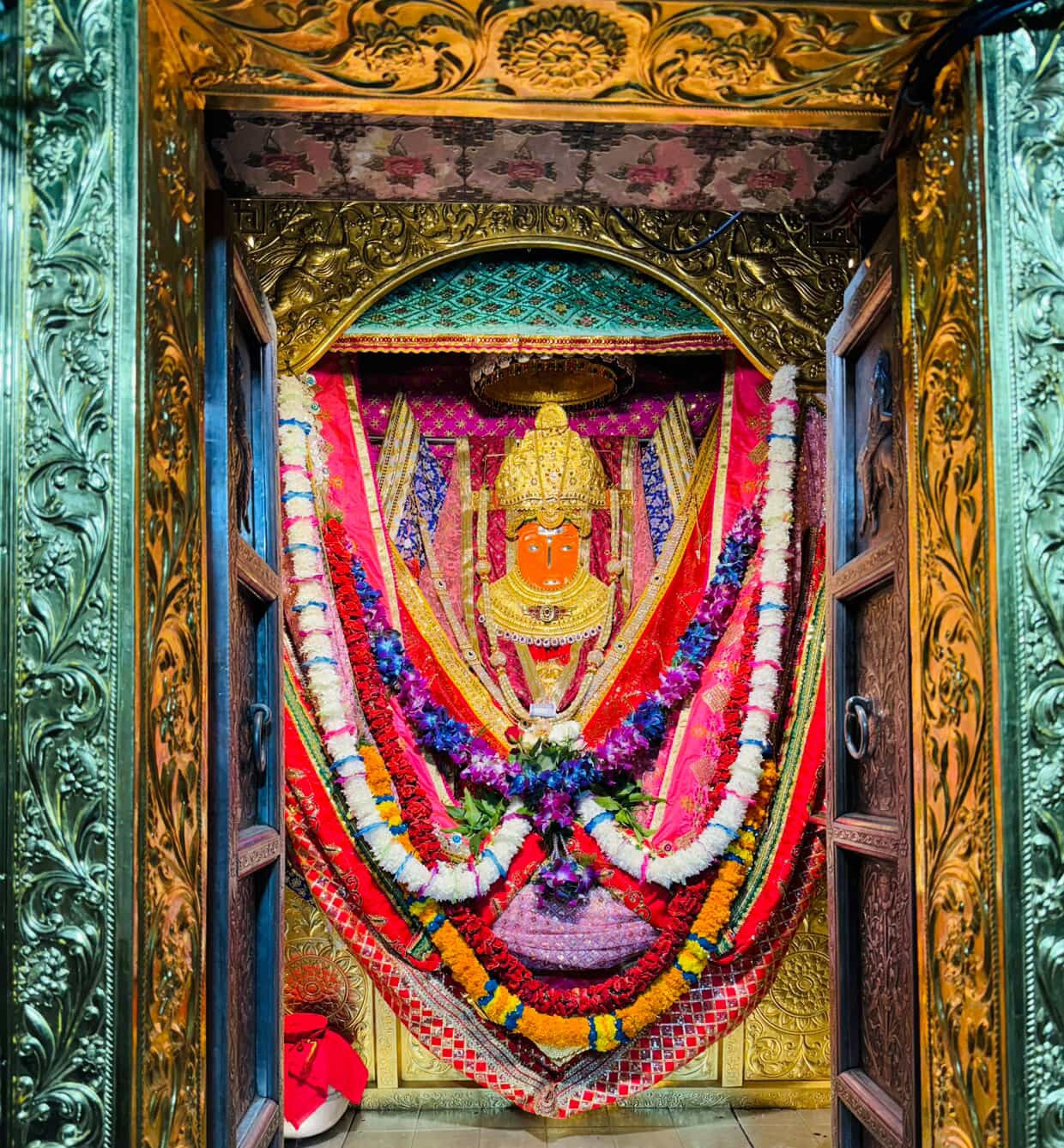
- Jeen Mata Temple idol in Sikar District

- Location in Rajasthan
- Coordinates: 27.444154°N 75.194457°E
- Country: India
- State: Rajasthan
- District: Sikar
- Named for: Jeen Mata

Languages
  - Official: Hindi
- Time zone: UTC+5:30 (Indian Standard Time (IST))
- PIN: 332406
- Vehicle registration: RJ-23
- Lok Sabha Constituency: Sikar

Jeen Mata is a village located in the Sikar district of Rajasthan, India. It is famous for the ancient and revered Jeen Mata Temple, which is dedicated to the goddess Jeen Mata (Jayanti Mata), believed to be a form of the Shakti deity. The village is approximately 29 kilometers south of Sikar city and about 108 kilometers northwest of Jaipur.

== History of the temple ==
According to local legends, Jeen Mata was originally a girl named Jeevan. She later went into deep meditation at a place called "Kajal Shikhar" in the Aravalli mountains. It is believed that she meditated in honor of Goddess Jayanthi and later became revered as Jeen Mata. The temple, which is constructed of marble and limestone, is believed to be over a thousand years old, dating back to the 8th century. Pilgrims flock to the temple during the auspicious months of Chaitra and Ashvin during the Navratri festival.

== Features of the temple ==
- The temple's gates never close, and regular prayers are conducted even during lunar eclipses.
- The temple is situated on a hilltop, surrounded by dense forests, about 10 kilometers from the village of Revsa.
- Within the temple complex, there is also the Harsh Bhairav Nath temple, located at the peak.

== Traditions ==
A popular tradition includes the "Jadula" ritual, a first hair-cutting ceremony for boys, which is performed at the temple.

== Legend of Aurangzeb ==
According to the legend, during the reign of Mughal Emperor Aurangzeb (1658–1707), his forces attempted to desecrate or destroy the Jeen Mata temple as part of his broader temple-demolition campaigns. As the story goes, when the soldiers tried to enter the sanctum, supernatural events occurred — the hill trembled, dust storms rose, and a swarm of bees attacked the intruders. The troops fled in panic, and Aurangzeb, said to be awed by the goddess’s power, ordered the temple left untouched.

After this incident, Aurangzeb pledged to provide oil from the imperial court at Delhi for the temple’s akhand jyoti (eternal flame), which is believed to have been burning for centuries. Owing to the episode in which swarms of bees were said to have attacked Aurangzeb’s troops, the goddess is popularly referred to as the “Bhanwaron ki Devi” (Goddess of the Bees) in the Shekhawati region.

== Gallery ==
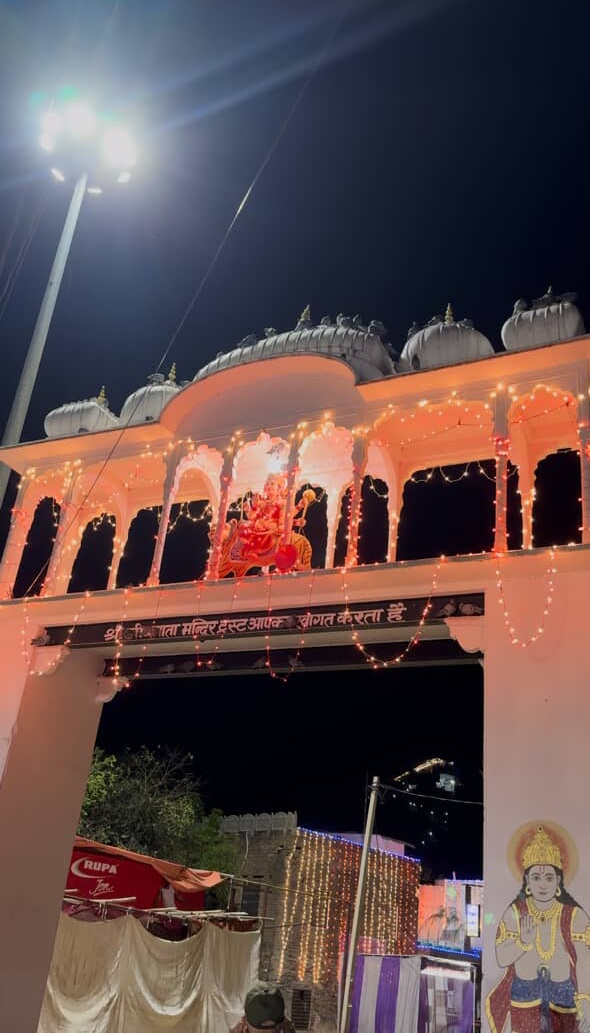
Main entrance of Jeen Mata Temple

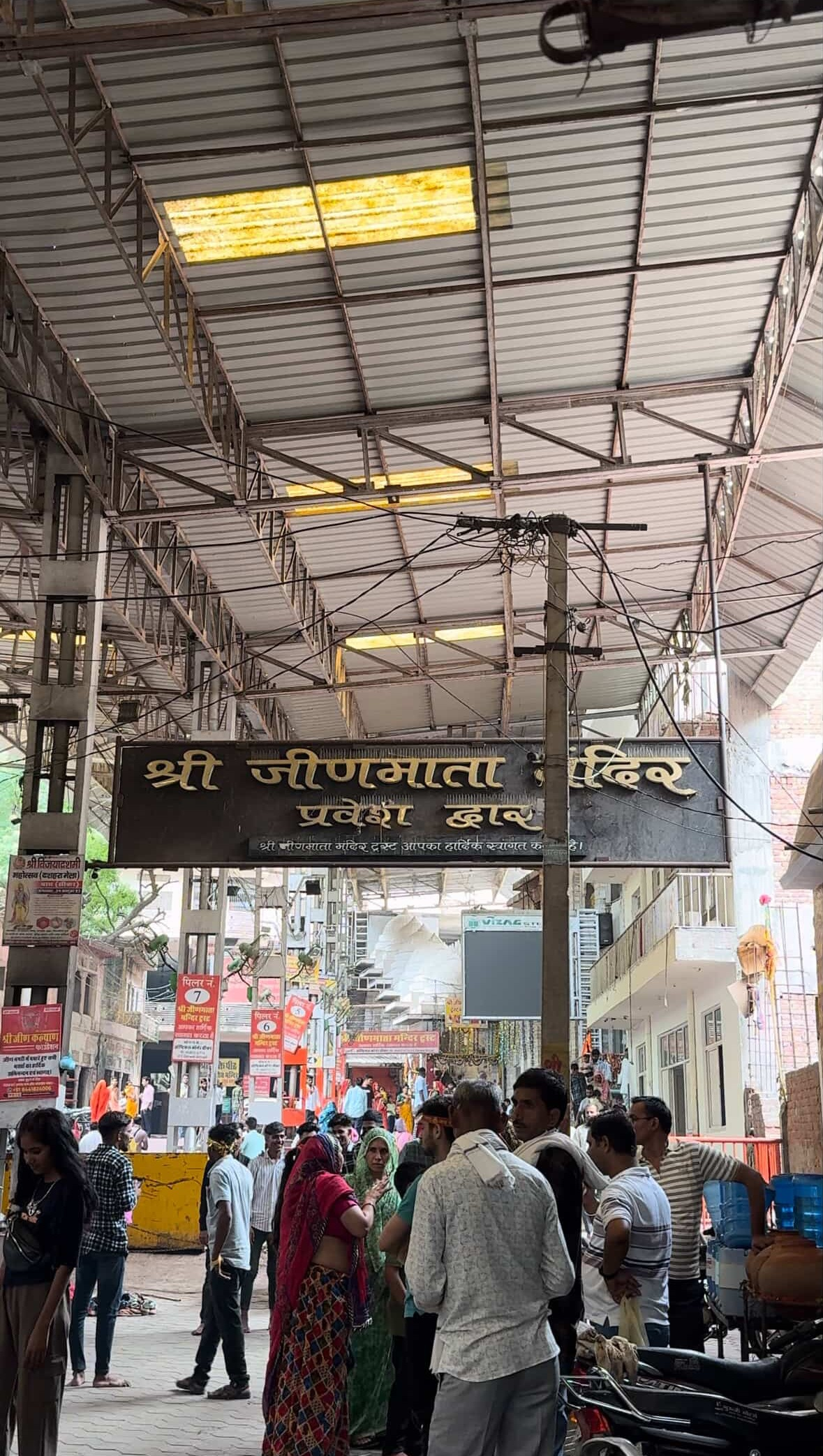
Corridor inside Jeen Mata Temple complex

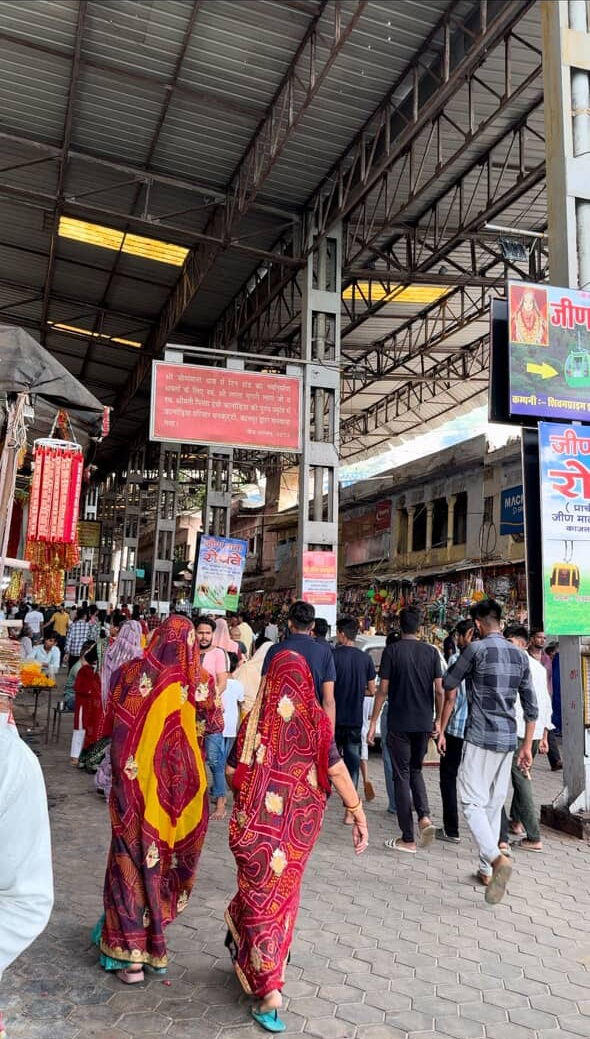
Local market near the Jeen Mata Temple

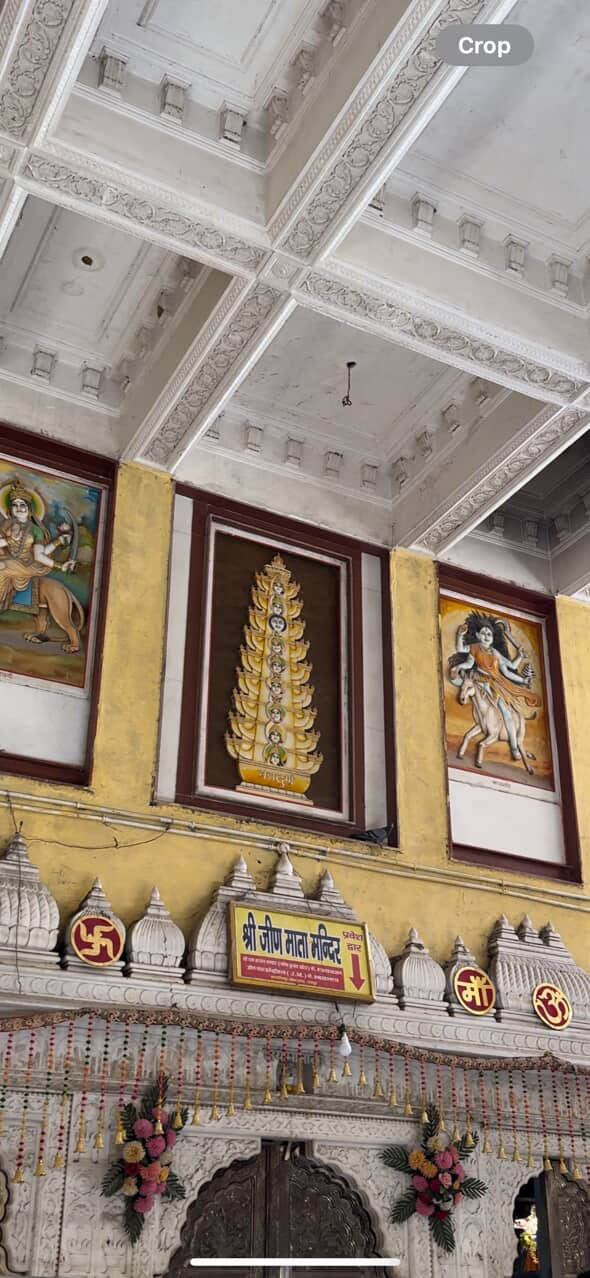
Outer area of the Jeen Mata Temple premises

== See also ==
- Salasar Balaji Temple
- Khatu Shyam Temple
- Rani Sati Temple
