= Sankhu, Sikar =

Sankhu Sankhoo
- Village
- Location in Rajasthan, India
- Coordinates: 27.901294°N 75.173814°E
- Country: India
- State: Rajasthan
- District: Sikar
- Established: 1618AD
- Founded by: Thakurs of Sankhu are descendants of Maharaj Kishan Singhji, second son of Raja Rai Singhji (6th ruler of Bikaner), and brother of Raja Dalpat Singhji (7th ruler of Bikaner), who had conferred the hereditary Dohri Tazim, Hathro Kurab to the thikana

Government
  - Body: Panchayat
  - Sarpanch
- Elevation: 424.24 m (1,391.9 ft)

Languages
  - Official: Hindi
- Time zone: UTC+5:30 (IST)
- PIN: 332401
- Telephone code: 91-1573
- Vehicle registration: RJ-23
- Nearest city: Nawalgarh, Mukandgarh and Laxmangarh
- Distance from Nawalgarh: 11 kilometres (6.8 mi) (land)
- Distance from Sikar: 42 kilometres (26 mi) (land)
- Distance from Jhunjhunu: 33 kilometres (21 mi) (land)
- Distance from Dundlod: 7 kilometres (4.3 mi) (land)
- Distance from Bidsar: 5 kilometres (3.1 mi) (land)
- Avg. summer temperature: 46-48 °C
- Avg. winter temperature: 0-1 °C

Sankhu or Sankhoo is a village in the Laxmangarh administrative region of the Sikar district of Rajasthan state in India. The village lies 17 kilometres (11 mi) east of Laxmangarh and 9 kilometres (5.6 mi) from Nawalgarh. The bordering villages and towns include Bidsar, Mirzwas, Dundlod, Kheri Radan, Churi Miyan and Balaran, Sikar.

== Village government ==
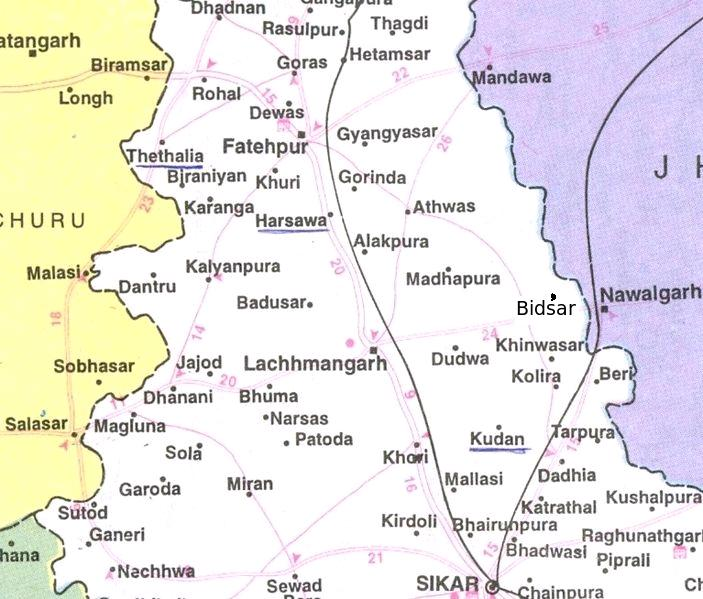
Location of Sankhu in Sikar District

Sankhu falls under Churi Miyan Panchayat. The title of leader is Sarpanch.

== Village economy ==
About 63% of the population are engaged in farming. Village agriculture is dependent on the monsoon rains although today many farms use artesian wells for irrigation.

== Climate ==
Sankhu has a hot summer, scanty rainfall, a chilly winter season and a general dryness of the air, except in the brief monsoon season. The average maximum and minimum temperatures are 28-30 and 15–16 degrees Celsius, respectively.

== Transportation ==
Sankhu is connected by a two lane asphalt road to Laxmangarh, Mukandgarh and Nawalgarh. Nawalgarh Railway station 12 kilometres (7.5 mi) from Sankhu, which is well connected from Jaipur, Delhi and other cities. Asphalt roads connect the village to surrounding villages and to Laxmangarh.

Camel carts and bullock carts were formerly the chief means of transportation and are being replaced by bicycles and other automobiles. Quite a few villagers walked to Nawalgarh and other surrounding places. In the rainy season, womenfolk bring grass on their heads for cows and buffaloes.

== Education ==
The villagers claim to be fully literate while all children now attend school. However, many women remain illiterate, although literacy rates are improving. Many students of the village have obtained admission to pioneering engineering institutes as well as into medical colleges through various competitions run by the AIPMT, IIT, AIEEE etc. Besides these, other careers such as teaching, nursing, and the defense forces are also popular.

== Religion ==
Majority of the citizenry practises Hinduism. Jats, mali(saini), Meena, Meghwals, Brahmins, Jangir live in the village.

== Society and culture ==
Village society is governed solely by Hindu rituals although the younger generation has been affected by western cultural influences.

== Music and entertainment ==
Folk songs are sung by women during weddings and on other social occasions. Menfolk sing dhamaal (traditional Holi songs). Many villagers own TVs as well as radios and satellite dishes. The sound of popular Hindi music emanating from stereos and other devices is heard from different houses during the afternoon and evening.

== Games and sports ==
Most of the children play cricket. Some villagers also play volleyball, Chess and football. Villagers can be seen playing cards in chaupal (village common area).

== Festivals ==
Villagers celebrate all major Hindu festivals. Some of the major festivals are Holi, Deepawali, Makar Sankranti, Raksha Bandhan, Sawan, Teej, and Gauga Peer, Gangaur.

== Religious places ==
- Sankhu Hanuman Mandir
- Gogamedi Mandir
