= Sigdola Chhota =

Sigdola Chhota is a small village in the Laxmangarh tehsil of the Sikar district, Rajasthan, India. It has a small shrine to Baba Ram.
