= Nimera =

Village in Rajasthan, India

Coordinates: 27.518°N 75.529°E

Nimera is a village in Sikar district of Rajasthan, India. According to the 2011 census it has a population of 203 living in 392 households.
