= Khatikan Pyau =

- Village

Other transcription(s)
- Location within Rajasthan Location within India
- Country: India
- State: Rajasthan
- District: Sikar

Government
  - Type: Panchayat raj
  - Body: Gram panchayat
- Elevation: 620 m (2,030 ft)

Population (2011)
  - Total: 10,000
- Sex ratio 517/512 ♂/♀

Languages
  - Official: Hindi
- Time zone: UTC+5:30 (IST)

Khatikan Pyau is a village in Sikar district of Rajasthan, India. It is located 3.2 kilometres from Sikar, 39 kilometres from Nawalgarh, and 2.7 kilometres from Railway Hospital, Sikar. The village is administrated by a sarpanch who is an elected representative of village as per Panchayati raj (India). Khatikan pyau is the type of Khatik Mohalla where Khatik people live.

== Religious places ==
Khatikan Bagichi Hindu temple is just 450 mtr. Sri Vriddheshwar Mahadev Mandir is popular hindu temple there. Harshnath Hindu temple is just 19 kilometers.

== Transport ==
Sikar bus stand is 3.8 kilometers from Khatikan pyau and Jaipur International airport is 130 kilometers away.

== See also ==
- Khatik Mohalla (disambiguation)
