= Sutot =

Sutot Sutot
- village
- Country: India
- State: Rajasthan
- District: sikar

Languages
  - Official: Hindi
- Time zone: UTC+5:30 (IST)
- PIN: 332041
- Telephone code: +9101570262475
- ISO 3166 code: RJ-IN
- Vehicle registration: RJ 23
- Nearest city: sikar

Sutot is a village in tehsil Laxmangarh of Sikar district in Rajasthan, India. It is situated at a distance of 24 km west of Sikar on the Sikar-Salasar road.
