= Nagardas =

Village in Rajasthan, India

- Village
- Village in India Nagardas (India)
- Coordinates: 27.62°N 75.15°E
- Country: India
- State: Rajasthan
- District: Sikar
- Tehsil: Fatherpur

Government
  - Member of Legislative Assembly: Hakam Ali Khan
- Elevation: 316 m (1,037 ft)

Population (2011)
  - Total: 1,149

Languages
  - Official: Hindi
- Time zone: UTC+5:30 (IST)
- PIN: 332302
- Telephone code: 01571
- Vehicle registration: RJ-23

Nagardas is a village located in the Sikar district of Shekhawati region, in Rajasthan state, India. Nagardas is within the Fatehpur Tehsil. As of 2011, the village had a total population of 1149.

== Geography ==
Nagardas is located at 27°62' North, 75°15' East. The total geographical area of the village is 2125 Bigha (1,329 acres or 538 hectares). Village is located at a distance of 14 km from Fatehpur. Nagardas is near to the historical village of Darunda, Bagas, Athidan Charan Ki Dhani and Barwa Ki Dhani. The temperature ranges from sub-zero in the winter to above 45°C during summer.

== Demographics ==
As per the census of 2011, the population was 1149, of whom 596 were male and 553 were female with literacy rate of 92.81%. The village has a total population of 1149 and has total administration over 209 houses which are connected to supplies basic amenities like water and sewerage.

- Nagardas has 161 children, 86 boys and 75 girls.
- Scheduled caste counts for 275 (23.93%) males constitute 137 (11.92%) of the population and females 138 (12.01%).

Majority of the population depends on the rainwater for the agriculture; its main crops are Bajra, Mung, Guar, and Chawla.
