= Pandit Deendayal Upadhyaya Shekhawati University =

State university in Rajasthan, India

- Former name: Shekhawati University
- Type: Public
- Established: August 23, 2012; 14 years ago
- Affiliations: UGC
- Chancellor: Governor of Rajasthan
- Vice-Chancellor: Yudhveer Singh
- Location: Katrathal, Sikar district, Rajasthan, India
- Campus: Rural
- Website: www.shekhauni.ac.in

Pandit Deendayal Upadhyaya Shekhawati University, is a state university situated in the village Katrathal, in Sikar district, 15 kilometres (9.3 mi) from Sikar, in Rajasthan, India. The university caters the study needs of the students from the Shekhawati region.

== History ==
The university was established in the year 2012 by Rajasthan Legislative Assembly by passing Shekhawati University, Sikar Act, 2012. The jurisdiction of university is Shekhawati region which comprises the Sikar, Jhunjhunu and Churu districts of Rajasthan. The university was renamed in 2014 through the Shekhawati University, Sikar (Change of Name) Act, 2014.

== Campus ==
The university was allotted 61 acres (25 ha) of land near to the village Katrathal on state highway 8 to construct its campus. The university operated from a temporary campus in Sikar, behind the Government Girls College, while the campus was under construction. In 2021 the university shifted to the permanent campus.

== See also ==
- List of universities in Rajasthan
- List of state universities in India
