= Rosawa =

- village
- Location in Rajasthan, India Rosawa (India)
- Coordinates: 27.95°N 74.85°E
- Country: India
- State: Rajasthan
- District: Sikar
- Elevation: 319 m (1,047 ft)

Population (2001)
  - Total: 4,662

Languages
  - Official: Hindi
- Time zone: UTC+5:30 (IST)
- PIN: 332301
- Telephone code: 01571
- ISO 3166 code: RJ-IN

Rosawa is a village in Fatehpur tehsil of Sikar district of Rajasthan. It is located in west direction at a distance of about 15 km from Fatehpur.
