= Karanga Chhota =

Village in Rajasthan, India

Karanga Chhota is a village in Fatehpur Shekhawati in Sikar district of Rajasthan in India. Karanga chhota have more than 2000 population
