= Mandela Chhota, Rajasthan =

Village in Rajasthan, India

Mandela Chhota is a small village 10 km from Fatehpur, Shekhawati (District: Sikar) on Fatehpur-Salasar road. Access to nearby town, Fatehpur, is good and transportation means are adequate.

Population of the village is around 3000 comprising two religions, Hindus and Muslims, with almost half population of each. There is remarkable level of religious harmony between the two religious groups and it is quite common that these two groups celebrate festivals with each other. Muslims families belong to mostly Kayamkhani- Khatri, Bhati, Nirban, Gouri, Jamalkhani, Dolatkhani, There are 2 mosques in the village. And there are many temples. There is a lot of camaraderie here.

Villagers are mostly farmers but lately they are shifting to service and trade related occupations. A large segment of working people work in Arab countries.

The village has two primary schools. There is also senior secondary level school in Mandela Bara, Just 200 meter from the village. Mandeal Bara is its sister village and distance between the two is merely 100 meter.

Here summers are hot and arid with temperatures reaching as high as 50C. In these times, sand storms and hot dry winds, called Loo, are common phenomena. In months of May and June, Loo becomes unbearable and may cause heatstroke. Rainfall is scanty and so is vegetation. Landscape consists bare sand dunes and scanty bushes. Winters are severely cold with minimum temperature falling to 0C in January. The crops grown are mainly Bajra, Mung, Moth, Til and Gawar. Famines occur frequently.

January month has very cold every year, just we can add or notice final temp from this village,

Sarpanch of the village:- Saroj Devi Budaniya.

Edit by BEING MUBARIK KHATRI MANDELA CHHOTA
