= Losal =

Small city (Town) in Rajasthan, India

- Town
- Location in Rajasthan, India Losal (India)
- Coordinates: 27.4°N 74.92°E
- Country: India
- State: Rajasthan
- District: Sikar
- Elevation: 410 m (1,350 ft)

Population (2011)
  - Total: 28,504

Languages
  - Official: Hindi & Rajasthani
- Time zone: UTC+5:30 (IST)
- PIN: 332025
- Telephone code: 01577
- ISO 3166 code: RJ-IN

Losal is a town with municipality in the Sikar District in Rajasthan, India.

== Geography ==
Losal is located at 27.4°N 74.92°E. It has an average elevation of 410 meters (1345 feet). Losal lays 100 km northeast of Jaipur.

Losal, located in Sikar District along the Sikar to Salasar highway and intersected by the Sikar to Diwana highway. Losal is organized into thirty-five wards.

== History ==
Losal is holy land of Baba Parmanand and Baba Raghuveer Das ji, both famous saints of Shekhawat. The oldest school here is senior secondary co-ed school, built by the late Seth Shri Dedraj Khaitan. Now there are about 50 schools and colleges in Losal. Total resident population of Losal is about 30,000 in addition to more than 15,000 students studying in local institutions.

Shri Dedraj Khaitan was the brother of Shri Mukha Lal Khaitan, one of the biggest jute traders of Calcutta in pre-independence era. Sri Mukha Lal Khaitan and Shri Dedraj Khaitan then established Losal's first School called Sri Ded Raj Khaitan School and its first Hospital, now both run by State Government of Rajasthan. Smt. Gulab Devi Khaitan, wife of Shri Dedraj khaitan also laid the foundation stone of first and only library in Losal to promote education in the town. They also constructed the first Girls hostel in Sikar today known as Krishna Chatrawaas for Dalit girls. Smt. Gulab Devi Khaitan was the sister of Seth Sri Jamnalal Bajaj, noted industrialist, philanthropist, freedom fighter and a very close associate of Mahatma Gandhi. Haripura is a small village under Losal municipal corporation, is native palace of Kargil sahid Syodana Ram Bijarniya. The town is witnessing accelerated growth recently with the development of several educational institutions, real estate projects and town development activities. Many of these projects are being developed by an infrastructure development company which is part of the business group of Shri Hargovind Khaitan, the only son of late Shri Dedraj Khaitan. The company is working to transform people's lives in rural and semi urban areas by providing better amenities, infrastructure and access to opportunities. The main objectives of these initiatives are:

1. Provide dwelling units to all the village citizens with clean water supply and sanitation facilities,
2. Apart from upgrading existing schools, establishment of few colleges, world class vocational training institutions in construction, carpentry, welding, natural art; computer maintenance and services, IT Enabled Services, BPO and a Call Center,
3. Enable people in the town to get quality healthcare through tele-medicine and also through mobile clinics,

4) Promotion of horticulture products, apart from agriculture in collaboration with nearby agricultural universities and research institutions, 5) Promotion of agro-processing industries for value addition to horticulture produce, 6) Creation of dairy farms for providing additional non-farm revenue to farmers, 7) Provision of employment to all employable people of the village through additional jobs in dairy, agro-processing, construction, handicraft and tourism enterprises. 8) Losal not a village but it is city

Losal is a Municipality city in the Sikar district, Rajasthan. Losal city is divided into 25 wards for which elections are held every 5 years. The Losal Municipality has the population of 28,504 of which 14,185 are males while 14,319 are females as per a report released by Census India 2011.

The population of Children with age of 0-6 is 4267 which is 14.97% of the total population of Losal (M). In Losal Municipality, the female sex ratio is 1009 against state average of 928. Moreover, the child sex ratio in Losal is around 900 compared to Rajasthan state average of 888. The literacy rate of Losal city is 67.69% higher than the state average of 66.11%. In Losal, male literacy is around 82.03% while the female literacy rate is 53.77%.

Losal Municipality has total administration over 4,518 houses to which it supplies basic amenities like water and sewerage. It is also authorized to build roads within Losal Municipality limits and impose taxes on properties coming under its jurisdiction.

There are a lot of temples in Losal: the temple of Ramdev ji, Balaji, Shesh Nag is the main temple. Shesh Nag temple is well known for Krishna Janmasthmi. Here every year shri krishna janmasthmi celebrates by shri krishna bal mandal.
