= Bhopatpura =

Village in Rajasthan, India

- Village
- Interactive map of Bhopatpura
- Coordinates: 27°23′26″N 75°31′52″E
- Country: India
- State: Rajasthan
- District: Jhunjhunu
- Town: Reengus

Bhopatpura is a village in Reengus, Jhunjhunu district, Rajasthan, India.
