= Nabipura =

Village in Rajasthan, India

Coordinates: 28°00′N 75°07′E

Nabipura is a village in India located in the Fatehpur tehsil of the Sikar district of the state Rajasthan. It is located 18 km east of Fatehpur. Nearby villages include: Beswa, Balodi, Dhakali, Maroth Pura, Deenwa Ladh Kani, Malta and Bagroda.

== Demographics ==
According to the 2011 census, there are about 378 homes in the village. The majority of people living in the village are members of the Jat gotra,

Nabipura has a total population of 2071, 1034 men and 1037 women. There are 244 children aged 0–6, i.e. 11.78% of the population.

Nabipura's average sex ratio (male to female) is 1003. This is higher than the Rajasthan state average, which is only 928. Nabipura's child sex ratio, on the other hand, is 755, which is lower than Rajasthan's average of 888.

As of 2011, Nabipura has a literacy rate of 78.6%, while Rajasthan as a whole only has a literacy rate of 66.11%. The village's male literacy stands at 93.52%, while female literacy rate is only 64.27%.

== Caste factor ==
Members of the Scheduled Castes (SC) constitute 10.14% of the total population of Nabipura village. The village currently doesn't have any Scheduled Tribe (ST) in its population. Almost all people belong to the Hindu religion, but there is no caste-based discrimination in the community.

== Work profile ==
In Nabipura village, 767 people work. 41.2% of them describe their work as main work (employment or earning for more than 6 months), 58.80% as marginal activity (providing a livelihood for less than 6 months). Of the 767 workers engaged in main work, 190 are farmers (owners or co-owners) while 28 are agricultural laborers.

== Geography ==
The natural climatic conditions in the village are very harsh. The temperature ranges from sub-zero in the winters to more than 50 °C in the summers. The summers bring heat waves called loo. The village lies in the Thar Desert region and annual rainfall is very low, on the scale of 4.5 cm. The people in the region depend on rainwater for agriculture. There are three major tube-wells in the village (punia ka bass, dhaka ka bass and in the harijana ka mohala). The ground water in the village is in good condition and is supplied in different mohalas (a locality in a village or town) of the village like the Kotri mohala and the Kathi kua mohalla. " Rabiya ka mohalla"

== Administration ==
Fatehpur also serves as a constituency of the Rajasthan legislative assembly. Fatehpur Panchayat Samiti has under it the following villages: Athwas, Almas (Aalmas), Badusar, Balara, Balod, Banthod, Batdanau, Beswa, Bhinchari, Bibipur, Birania, Chudimiyan, Dataru, Deenwa-ladkhani, Dewas, Dhandan, Dhimoli, Dishnau, Gangyasar, Gaarinda, Godiya, Hirna, Hudera, Kayamsar, Khotiya, Mandela, Nabipura, Nayabas, Palas, Rajas, Rajpura, Rohal, Rosawa, Sahnusar, Takhalsar and Tihawali.

As per the constitution of India and the Panchyati Raaj Act, Nabipura village is administrated by the Sarpanch (Head of Village) who is the elected representative of the village.
