= Khood =

Khood is a village at Sikar district in Rajasthan, India. It is located in southwest part of Shekhawati. Khood is a large village located in Danta Ramgarh Tehsil of Sikar district, Rajasthan with total 1072 families residing. The Khood village has population of 6540 of which 3348 are males while 3192 are females as per Population Census 2011.
