= Fadanpura =

Fadanpura Phandanpura
- village
- Location in Rajasthan, India Fadanpura (India)
- Coordinates: 28.07°N 74.93°E
- Country: India
- State: Rajasthan
- District: Sikar

Government
  - Body: Gram panchayat
- Elevation: 313 m (1,027 ft)

Languages
  - Official: Hindi
- Time zone: UTC+5:30 (IST)
- PIN: 332301
- Telephone code: 01571
- ISO 3166 code: IN-RJ

Fadanpura is a village in Fatehpur tehsil of Sikar district in Rajasthan, 5 km away from Fatehpur City by road. There are about 450 houses in the village, with a total population above 1100 people. Five temples in this village and most oldest temple of "THAKUR Ji" made by Shekhawat's situated in middle of this village. Other temples name are Sati Dadi Jamvay Maa Jasnath ji Maharaj and Lord Hanuman. Sati Dadi's temple, made by Khetaram Jangid, is 2 km away from this village. Jasnath ji Mharaj's temple made by Jyani is the first temple you can see when you come in this village by road.

The natural climatic conditions in the village are very harsh. The temperature ranges from sub-zero in winters to more than 50 °C in summers. The summers bring hot waves of air called "loo". The village lies in the Thar Desert region, and annual rainfall is very low, on the scale of 450 mm. The people in the region depend on rainwater for agriculture.
