= Tihawali =

Village in Rajasthan, India

Tihawali is a village in Fatehpur tehsil, Sikar District, in the Rajasthan state of India. As of the 2011 Census of India, it had a population of 3,946 across 672 households.
