= Nangal Abhaypura =

Nangal
- Village
- Country: India
- State: Rajasthan
- District: Sikar
- Elevation: 427 m (1,401 ft)

Population
  - Total: 3,000

Languages
  - Regional: Rajasthani, Hindi
- Time zone: UTC+5:30 (IST)
- PIN: 332402
- Telephone code: 91-1576
- ISO 3166 code: RJ-IN
- Vehicle registration: RJ-23
- Literacy: 80.98%
- Distance from Palsana: 11 kilometres (6.8 mi) (land)
- Climate: Köppen climate classification (Köppen)
- Avg. annual temperature: 16-20 °C
- Avg. summer temperature: 45-46 °C
- Avg. winter temperature: 0-1 °C

Nangal is a village located in the Sikar district of the Indian state Rajasthan. It is 11 km away from Palsana, 10 km from Khandela, 3 km from Bamanwas and 3.5 km away from Dudhwalo ka Bass.16% of Sical's population is under the age of 6.

== Demographics ==
Nangal village has a population of about 3,000 people. However, because it covers a big area, population of the village was 2,287 according to census in 2001. The population density of the village was 29 according to the same census. Males constitute 52% of the population. Nangal has an average literacy rate of 92.98% as per the 2011 census, higher than the state average of 67.05%: male literacy is 86.66%, and female literacy is 58.76%. In Sikar, 16% of the population is under 6 years of age.

The main caste groups are Balai, Kharra, Mawaliya, Kumawats, Jats, Gujjars/Meenas, and functionary caste as Khati, Lohar, Sunar and Nai are also found in Nangal and nearest villages like Abhaypura.

== Education ==
Govt Sr. Sec. School	Nangal Stand
Govt Upper Primary School	Ramsar (Closed)
Sumitra Public School	Nangal (Closed)

== Area ==
Village	3.44 km^{2}
Main Village	0.57 km^{2}

== Population (2001) ==
Male	1329
Female	1100
Total	2856
Growth Rate	24.11%

== Rain ==
Average	459.8 mm

== See also ==
- Sikar district
- Sikar (Lok Sabha constituency)
