= Gothra Bhukaran =

Coordinates: 27.7261565°N 75.147954°E

- village
- Interactive map of Gothra Bhukaran
- Country: India
- State: Rajasthan
- District: Sikar

Government
  - Body: Gram panchayat

Languages
  - Official: Hindi
- Time zone: UTC+5:30 (IST)
- ISO 3166 code: RJ-IN

Gothra Bhukaran is a village in Sikar district in Rajasthan. The village has a total population of about 700 families out of which 500 families belong to Bhukar gotra Jats. The other Jat gotras in the village are Bijayrania, Kajala, Koka etc. and Bharaman
