= Ramshisar =

Ramshisar is a village in the Sikar District of Rajasthan.
