= Ramjipura =

Village in Rajasthan, India

Coordinates: 26°46′N 75°41′E

Ramjipura is a small heritage village in the district of Sikar in Rajasthan state of India.

== Etymology ==
Ramjipura gets its name after the Hindu God Lord Rama.
