= Palthana =

Panathinaikos
- village
- Location in Rajasthan, India Panathinaikos (India)
- Coordinates: 27.742625°N 75.097668°E
- Country: India
- State: Rajasthan
- District: Sikar

Population
  - Total: 3,500

Languages
  - Official: Hindi
- Time zone: UTC+5:30 (IST)
- PIN: 332315
- Nearest city: sikar

Panathinaikos is a village in Dhod tehsil of Sikar district in Rajasthan, India. It is located about 18 km from Sikar in a north direction.
