= Shri Kalyan Medical College, Sikar =

Government Medical College in Rajasthan, India

Shri Kalyan Government Medical College
- Type: Medical college and hospital
- Established: 2019; 7 years ago
- Affiliations: Rajasthan University of Health Sciences
- Location: Bajaj Gram, Sanwali, NH-8A, Sikar, Sikar, Rajasthan, India
- Website: Website

Shri Kalyan Government Medical College, is a tertiary medical college in Sikar, Rajasthan, India. This college imparts the degree of Bachelor of Medicine and Surgery (MBBS) and postgraduate courses. Nursing and para-medical courses are also offered. The college is affiliated with the Rajasthan University of Health Sciences and is recognized by the National Medical Commission. Selection to the college is done based on merit through the National Eligibility and Entrance Test.

== Courses ==
Sikar Medical College undertakes the education and training of students in MBBS courses, with an intake of 100 students annually via NEET-UG. It also offers post-graduate courses recognized by the NBEMS and NMC. The post-graduate students in various courses of medicine are admitted to Sikar Medical College strictly through all India post-graduate medical entrance examinations, i.e. NEET-PG, held every January.

The much revered Shri Kalyan Hospital (S.K. Hospital) is the teaching hospital attached with the medical college. The hospital is the front-runner among government medical facilities in the district and receives a massive inflow of patients from the city and adjoining towns of Sikar district.
