= Churimiyan =

Village in Rajasthan, India

Churimiyan is a village in the Laxmangarh administrative region of the Sikar district of the Rajasthan state in India. The village lies 18 kilometres (10 mi) east of Laxmangarh and 17 kilometres from Nawalgarh. Villages and towns which border Churimiyan include Sankhu, Mirzwas, Balaran, Almas, Bhinchri and Bhagasara. Churi Miyan village was founded in 1170 by ChudSingh Sarawag.

== Climate ==
Churimiyan has a hot summer, scanty rainfall, a chilly winter season and a general dryness of the air, except in the brief monsoon season. The average maximum and minimum temperatures are 45–48 and 0–2 degrees Celsius, respectively.

== Economy ==
About 50% of the population are engaged in farming, Most of living in gulf countries for earning better. Village agriculture is dependent on the monsoon rains although many farms use artesian wells for irrigation. In the rainy season, women carry grass on their heads to feed the cows and buffaloes.

== Government ==
Churimiyan is a Panchayat. The leader is called a Sarpanch.

== Transport ==
Churimiyan is connected by a two lane asphalt road to Laxmangarh, Mukandgarh and Nawalgarh. Nawalgarh Railway station,17 kilometres (11 mi) from Churimiyan, is well connected from Jaipur, Delhi and other cities. Asphalt roads connect the village to surrounding villages and to Laxmangarh. Camel carts and bullock carts were formerly the chief means of transportation and are being replaced by bicycles and other automobiles.

== Culture ==
The major religions practiced in the area are Hinduism and Islam. India second Biggest SHYAM BABA Temple is there in Churimiyan .Villagers celebrate all major festivals including Eid al-Fitr, Holi, Diwali and Mawlid.

== Education ==
The village has recently promoted Govt. Higher secondary school with Science faculty. 2 Hindi medium secondary schools& 1 English medium school also being operated. The villagers claim to be fully literate while all children now attend school. However, many women remain illiterate, although literacy rates are improving. Many students of the village have obtained admission to pioneering engineering institutes as well as into medical colleges through various competitions run by organizations including IIT and AIEEE.
