= Moondwara =

Moondwara ramnagar
- village
- Location in Rajasthan, India Moondwara (India)
- Coordinates: 27.4943°N 75.0881°E
- Country: India
- State: Rajasthan

Population
  - Total: 6,000 approx.

Languages
  - Official: Hindi
- Time zone: UTC+5:30 (IST)
- ISO 3166 code: RJ-IN
- Vehicle registration: RJ23

Moondwara is a village in Sikar tehsil, Sikar district in Rajasthan, India. It is situated at a distance of 18 kilometres from Sikar in the south-west direction on Sikar-Naguor-Jodhpur road. This is an old historical village founded 600 years ago. This is a well-connected village. There are 500 families living in the village. It is a well-designed village. There is one road-crossed the village. There is one bazar in the center of the village.
