= Garinda =

Village in Rajasthan, India

- Interactive map of Garinda

Garinda is a village of Fatehpur Tehsil in the Sikar district. At the 2011 census, it had a total population of 3,637, composed of 1,882 men and 1,755 women.
