= Laxmangarh Fort =

Laxmangarh Fort लक्ष्मणगढ़ किला
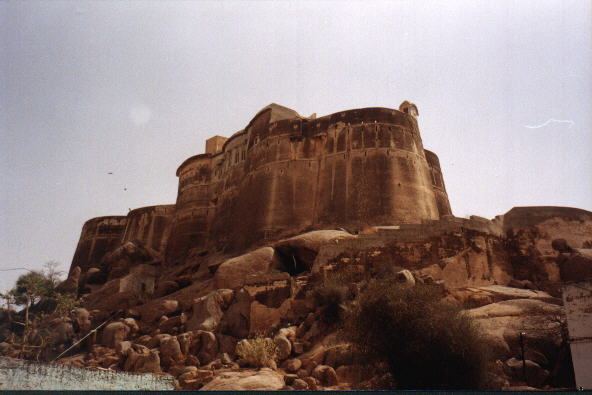
- Laxmangarh Fort

General information
- Location: Laxmangarh, Sikar, India
- Coordinates: 27.823829°N 75.024841°E

Laxmangarh Fort (Hindi: लक्ष्मणगढ़ किला) is a ruined old fort on a hill in the town of Laxmangarh of Sikar district in the Indian state of Rajasthan. Situated 30 kilometres (19 mi) from Sikar, it was built by Rao Raja Lakshman Singh of Sikar in 1805, who also founded a village in his own name as Laxmangarh in 1807.

The most imposing building in this Laxmangarh town is its small fortress (owned by the Jhunjhunwala Family) which looms over the well laid out township on its west side. Laxman Singh, the Raja of Sikar, built the fort in the early 19th century after Kan Singh Saledhi besieged the prosperous town. The fort of Laxmangarh is a unique piece of fort architecture in the whole world because the structure is built upon scattered pieces of huge rocks. The nearest thikana is Hamirpura and it is name on his son Yuvraj Hamir Singh .

== In popular culture ==
- The Laxmangarh Fort is a prominent symbol in Aravind Adiga's debut novel The White Tiger, which won the Man Booker Prize in 2008.
