= Thikariya =

Clan of the Hindu and Muslim Gurjars

Thikariya, Thikaria
- Jāti: Gurjar (Gujjar)
- Religions: Hinduism, Sikhism, Islam
- Languages: Gujari, Punjabi, Gujarati, Haryanvi, Marwari, Pahari, Pashto, Balochi and Hindi
- Country: India, Pakistan
- Region: Gujjarat, Rajasthan Punjab, Kashmir, Sindh, Balochistan, Haryana, Himachal Pradesh, Uttar Pradesh
- Lineage: Gurjar

Thikariya or Thikriya is a subcaste of the Thakkar clan, found among the Muslim and Hindu and possibly some Sikh Gujjars. The variations of the clan name include Thikariya, Thikria, Thikaria, Thekaria, or Thekria.Renowned personalities amongst the Thikaria clan include Baba Jee Chaudhry Ilyas Khan Theekriya Gujjar and Advocate Aftab Ahmed Gujjar

== Ethnography ==
Thikaria Gujjars are found in mainly in Rajasthan, Gujarat, Uttar Pradesh, Himachal Pradesh, Uttarakhand, Madhya Pradesh, Punjab and Jammu and Kashmir. They also found in Pothohar, Khyber and Azad Kashmir, Hazara regions of Pakistan.
