= Khuri Bari =

Khuri Bari Khudi Bari or Khudi Badi or Khuri or Khudi
- Village
- Location in Rajasthan, India Khuri Bari (India)
- Coordinates: 27.744474°N 75.069076°E
- Country: India
- State: Rajasthan
- District: Sikar
- Established: 1940

Government
  - Type: democratic
  - Body: BJP

Area
  - Total: 10 km^{2} (3.9 sq mi)
  - Rank: 8

Population
  - Total: 4,000
  - Density: 400/km^{2} (1,000/sq mi)

Languages
  - Official: Hindi
- Time zone: UTC+5:30 (IST)
- PIN: 332315
- Telephone code: 91-1573
- Vehicle registration: RJ-23
- Nearest city: Laxmangarh

Khuri Bari is a village in Laxmangarh Tehsil, Sikar district in the Indian state of Rajasthan. As of 2011 Khuri Bari had a population of 2194 residents.

== Transport ==
The village is located to the west of National Highway 52, between Sikar–Laxmangarh. Khuri Chhoti is on the west of the NH-52 road between Sikar–Laxmangarh and Khuri Bari is on the east of the NH-11.

== Education ==
The two centers of higher education nearby are Balaji College Ganeri and the Horizon Computer Education Institute & Technology Center.
