= Piprali =

Village in Rajasthan, India

Piprali is a village of Sikar district in Rajasthan. It is situated about 9.5 km in east from Sikar. Its population about 8,000. Presently Piprali is a Panchayat samiti of Sikar.
