= Nangal Bhim =

Village in Rajasthan, India

Nangal Bhim is a small village situated in Sikar District of Rajasthan state of India. This village is situated near Shrimadhopur city.
