= Roru =

- village
- Country: India
- State: Rajasthan

Government
  - Type: Panchayati raj (India)
  - Body: Gram panchayat

Languages
  - Official: Hindi
- Time zone: UTC+5:30 (IST)
- ISO 3166 code: RJ-IN
- Vehicle registration: RJ-23

Roru or Roroo is an ancient village in Laxmangarh tehsil in Sikar district in Rajasthan, India
