= Danta, Sikar =

Danta Danta Shekhawati
- Town
- Location within Rajasthan Location within India
- Coordinates: 27°18′N 75°11′E
- Country: India
- State: Rajasthan
- District: Sikar
- Established: 1410

Population (2011)
  - Total: 35,000+

Languages
  - Official: Hindi
- Time zone: UTC+5:30 (IST)
- PIN: 332702
- Telephone code: 0091-1577
- ISO 3166 code: RJ-IN
- Vehicle registration: RJ-23
- Nearest city: Sikar
- Literacy: 60% (approx)
- Lok Sabha constituency: Sikar
- Avg. summer temperature: 44-45 °C
- Winter temperature: 10 to -5 °C
- Website: http://www.sikar.org

Danta is a town in Rajasthan, India. Danta Fort is a historical site near the village. The fort, known as Danta Dera Fort, is now a heritage hotel.

Karni Mata Temple located near the village, which is made by Thakur Madan Singh Danta, and donated to Sayar Baisa (lady who used to perform the pooja in the temple) along with 300 bega land to meet the expenses to run the temple. Originally the temple building was a hunting lodge. The village was first settled by Thakur Amar Singh Shekhawat, about 1400 AD.

The population consists predominantly of Hindus, Muslims and Jains.

This area of Shekhawati, Rajasthan, is known for the famous personalities who reformed their own as well as the lives of those they touched. The most renowned and by far the most revered is the Akhil Bharat Varshiya Sadhumargi Jain Sangh’s eighth acharya, Acharya Nana lal ji maharaj sa.
