= Khuri Chhoti =

- Village
- Country: India
- State: Rajasthan
- District: Sikar

Population
  - Total: 1,200

Languages
  - Official: Hindi
- Time zone: UTC+5:30 (IST)
- PIN: 332315
- Telephone code: 91-1573
- Vehicle registration: RJ-23
- Nearest city: Laxmangarh
- Sex ratio: 100 Boys 90 Girls ♂/♀
- Literacy: 90%%
- Lok Sabha constituency: Sikar
- Vidhan Sabha constituency: Laxmangarh
- Climate: Winter 0°-10°, Summer 35°-50° (Köppen)

Khuri Chhoti is a small village/hamlet in Laxmangarh tehsil in Sikar, district of Rajasthan, India. It comes under Khuri Chhoti Panchayath. It is located 32 km towards North from District headquarters Sikar. 148 km from State capital Jaipur.

== History ==
Chhoti Khuri was established by Thakur Govind Singh, whose father Thakur Hameer Singh had ascended from the Dantaramgarh region of Sikar. The other son of Thakur Hameer Singh was instrumental in the establishment of Sawalda, a small village nearby. The village has been traditionally divided into five "Paanas".

== Education ==
There are 10 schools in Khuri Panchayat. There are three Senior Secondary schools are located in village and one of them is Government school. A separate girls school was made in time of the British in 1934 which is run by government. B R Memorial Public School, UPS Nechhwa, Little Public Nechhwa and G.G.U.P.S, Palari are the private owned schools. Mody Institute of Technology and Science, Rishikul Vidyapeeth Group of Institution, Shri B.D. Todi PG & BEd College. Bagaria BEd College, Raghunath BEd College Vinayak College, Trilok Singh College, Goenka College are the other institutes in the vicinity of the village.
