= Beedasar =

- Village
- Location in Rajasthan, India Beedasar (India)
- Coordinates: 27.8463334°N 75.1791537°E
- Country: India
- State: Rajasthan
- District: Sikar

Government
  - Body: Panchayat
- Elevation: 424.24 m (1,391.9 ft)

Population (2011)
  - Total: 2,037

Languages
  - Official: Hindi
- Time zone: UTC+5:30 (IST)
- PIN: 332316
- Telephone code: 91-1573
- ISO 3166 code: RJ-IN
- Vehicle registration: RJ-23

Beedasar is a village in the Laxmangarh administrative region of Sikar district of Indian state Rajasthan.

== Location ==
The village situated on the connecting road of town Laxmangarh and Nawalgarh.
