= Neem Ka Thana =

Municipal council in Rajasthan, India

- City
- Neem Ka Thana

- Location in Rajasthan, India
- Coordinates: 27.735018°N 75.779730°E
- Country: India
- State: Rajasthan
- District: Sikar

Government
  - Member of the Legislative Assembly: Suresh Modi
- Elevation: 446 m (1,463 ft)

Population
  - Total: 36,000

Languages
  - Official: Dhundhari, Hindi, Rajasthani
  - Spoken: Shekhawati & Torawati
- Time zone: UTC+5:30 (IST)
- PIN: 332713
- ISO 3166 code: RJ-IN
- Vehicle registration: RJ-23B
- Website: https://neemkathana.rajasthan.gov.in/

Neem Ka Thana is a city in Sikar district located 73 km from Sikar City in the Shekhawati region in the Rajasthan state of India. Sikar, Udaipurwati, Khandela, Sri Madhopur, Kotputli, Khetri, and Narnaul are some major cities and towns near Neem Ka Thana. It is located at a distance of 119 kilometers from Jaipur and 241 kilometers from Delhi. Neem Ka Thana is well connected with others cities in the region with roads and Indian Railways.

== Demographics ==
As of 2011 Indian census, Neem-Ka-Thana had a population 36,000 males constituting 53% of the population and females 47%.16% of the population is under 6 years of age. It has an average literacy rate of 67%, higher than the national average of 59.5%. Male literacy is 77%, and female literacy is 56%. Neem ka thana is an important commercial center of Shekhawati region of Rajasthan. The total area of the current Neem Ka Thana station district in 1016 hectares (as of 2015, when it was a municipality).
