= Danta Ramgarh =

Danta Ramgarh Danta Ramgarh Ramgarh
- Census town
- Danta Ramgarh
- Location in Rajasthan, India Danta Ramgarh (India)
- Coordinates: 27°15′27″N 75°10′48″E
- Country: India
- State: Rajasthan
- District: Sikar
- Founder: ladkhani shekhawat

Population (2011)
  - Total: 7,924

Languages
  - Official: Hindi
- Time zone: UTC+5:30 (IST)
- Postal code: 332703

Danta Ramgarh is a census town and a tehsil of Sikar district in the Indian state of Rajasthan. Ex vice president of India Bhairon Singh Shekhawat, was born in village Khachariyaws near the east of Ramgarh. Dantaramgarh tehsil is the largest tehsil in Sikar district and its population is above 300,000. This village is famous for its strategic fort built by Guman Singh Ladkhani in 1744. The view of the surroundings from the top of the fort is breath-taking. Baba Balinath was a very popular saint about 400 years back. He is regarded as a village deity in the area.

== Demographics ==
As per 2011 census of India, population of Ramgarh, a census town, was 7,924 of which 4,034 were males and 3,890 were females.

== Location ==
Dantaramgarh town is 51 km away from Sikar and 90 km away from Jaipur. Nearby railway station is Renwal railway station and the nearest airport is in Jaipur. Nearby temples are Khatu Shyamji and Jeenmataji.

Current MLA of Dantaramgarh is Virendra Singh Choudhary from Congress Party.

== See also ==
- Danta
