= Bau Dham =

Village in Rajasthan, India

Bau Dham is a village 13 kilometers from Laxmangarh, Sikar district, India.
