= Bhuma =

- village
- Location in Rajasthan, India Bhuma (India)
- Coordinates: 27.78°N 74.93°E
- Country: India
- State: Rajasthan
- District: Sikar
- Elevation: 354 m (1,161 ft)

Population (2001)
  - Total: 5,743

Languages
  - Official: Hindi
- Time zone: UTC+5:30 (IST)
- ISO 3166 code: RJ-IN

Bhuma is a Jat community village in Laxmangarh tehsil in Sikar district in Rajasthan. Bhuma has two habitations : Bhuma Bada and Bhuma Chhota. At the 2001 census the population of the village was 5,743, of which 1,420 are SC people. Bhuma Bara is located 10.9 km dwest of Town Lachhmangarh( also written as Laxmangarh) . Bhuma Bara is 30.2 km far from Sikar and 130 km far from Jaipur.

Nearby villages are Alakhpura Bogan (2.3 km), Bhojasar Bada (4.2 km), Badusar (5.9 km), Patoda (6.6 km), Hameerpura (7.5 km). Nearest Towns are Lachhmangarh (10.9 km), Fatehpur (25.3 km), Sikar (28 km), Dhod (31.8 km).

Lachhmangarh, Bagri, Beedasar, Beerodi Bari, Bhojasar Bada, Dahar Ka Bas, ... . are the villages along with this village in the same Lachhmangarh Mandal Mahala are most popular
