= Reengus =

- Town
- Location in Rajasthan, India Reengus (India)
- Coordinates: 27.37°N 75.57°E
- Country: India
- State: Rajasthan
- District: Sikar
- Elevation: 480 m (1,570 ft)

Population (2011)
  - Total: 26,139
- Postal code: 332404

Reengus is a town in Reengus tehsil of Sikar district.

== Demographics ==
As of 2011 India census, Reengus had a population of 26,139. Males constitute 54% of the population and females 46%. Reengus has an average literacy rate of 72%, higher than the national average of 59.5%: male literacy is 75%, and female literacy is 58%. In Reengus, 16% of the population is under 6 years of age.

== Notable places ==
- Khatushyam Temple
- Bheru ji Temple
