= Alakhpura Bogan =

Village in Rajasthan, India

Coordinates: 27.757°N 74.896°E

- Village and Panchayat
- Interactive map of Alakhpura Bogan
- Country: India
- State: Rajasthan
- District: Sikar

Alakhapura Bogan is a village and panchayat in Lachhmangarh tehsil, Sikar district, Rajasthan, India.
