= Balaran, Sikar =

Balaran Balara
- Village
- Location in Rajasthan, India Balaran (India)
- Coordinates: 27.908424°N 75.133731°E
- Country: India
- State: Rajasthan
- District: Sikar

Government
  - Body: Panchayat
  - Sarpanch
- Elevation: 424.24 m (1,391.9 ft)

Population (2011)
  - Total: 5,427

Languages
  - Official: Hindi
- Time zone: UTC+5:30 (IST)
- PIN: 332401
- Telephone code: 91-1573
- ISO 3166 code: RJ-IN
- Vehicle registration: RJ-23
- Nearest city: Nawalgarh, Mukandgarh and Laxmangarh
- Distance from Nawalgarh: 11 kilometres (6.8 mi) (land)
- Distance from Sikar: 36 kilometres (22 mi) (land)
- Distance from Jhunjhunu: 33 kilometres (21 mi) (land)
- Distance from Dundlod: 10 kilometres (6.2 mi) (land)
- Distance from Laxmangarh: 14 kilometres (8.7 mi) (land)
- Avg. summer temperature: 46-48 °C
- Avg. winter temperature: 0-1 °C

Balaran or Balara is a village in the Laxmangarh administrative region of the Sikar district of Rajasthan state in India. The village lies 13 kilometres (8.1 mi) east of Laxmangarh and 16 kilometres (9.9 mi) from Nawalgarh. It borders other villages and towns including; Bhairunpura, Sankhu, Mirzwas, Kheri Radan, Rajpura, Churi Miyan Swami Ki Dhani and Madopura. The nearby railway stations are Mukundgarh, Dundlod, Laxmangarh, and Sikar.

== Village economy ==
About 80% of the population are farmers. Village agriculture is dependent on the monsoon rains, although today many farms use artesian wells for irrigation.

== Transportation ==
Balaran is connected by a two-lane asphalt road to Laxmangarh, Mukandgarh and Nawalgarh. Nawalgarh Railway station is17 kilometres (11 mi) from Balaran and is well connected from Jaipur, Delhi and other cities. Asphalt roads connect the village to surrounding villages and to Laxmangarh.

Camel carts and bullock carts were formerly the chief means of transportation, now replaced by bicycles and other automobiles. Quite a few villagers walk to Nawalgarh and other surrounding places. In the rainy season, womenfolk carry grass on their heads for cows and buffaloes.
