= Sikar =

Sikar Shekhawati Pradesh
- City
- Location in Rajasthan, India Sikar (India)
- Coordinates: 27.62°N 75.15°E
- Country: India
- State: Rajasthan
- District: Sikar
- Settled: 1687; 339 years ago
- Founded by: Rao Dowlat Singh

Government
  - Type: Municipal Council
  - Body: Sikar Municipal Council
  - Member of Parliament, Lok Sabha: Amra Ram (Communist Party of India (Marxist))

Area
  - Total: 47 km^{2} (18 sq mi)
- Elevation: 427 m (1,401 ft)

Population (2020)
  - Total: 359,293
  - Rank: tenth

Languages
  - Official: Hindi
- Time zone: UTC+5:30 (IST)
- PIN: 332001
- Telephone code: +91-1572 / 01572
- Vehicle registration: RJ-23
- Literacy: 81.25%(2nd)
- Distance from New Delhi: 280 kilometres (170 mi) (land)
- Distance from Jaipur: 114 kilometres (71 mi) (land)
- Website: Sikar Municipal Council; Sikar District; Shekhawati Live

Sikar is a city and municipal council in the Sikar district of the state of Rajasthan in India. It is the administrative headquarters of the Sikar district. It is largest city of the Shekhawati region, which consists of Sikar, Churu and Jhunjhunu. After Kota, Sikar is number one coaching hub in the country for competitive examination preparations and has a number of engineering and medical coaching institutes.It is also known as Rajasthan's 'Mini Kota'.

Sikar is also a major hub for agricultural trade, given it is surrounded by large plains areas west of the Aravalli range. It is also a major rail and road junction.

Sikar has historical significance and contains several traditional havelis. It is 115 km (71 mi) away from Jaipur, 320 km (200 mi) from Jodhpur, 215 km (134 mi) from Bikaner, and 280 km (170 mi) from New Delhi.

Sikar district is also popular for Khatu Shyam Temple, situated in the town of Khatoo, 16 km from Reengus town and 45 km from Sikar city.

Another place for which Sikar is famous is the Harsh Parvat, part of Aravalli Range. Mainly, Harsh Parvat is known for the Harsh Temple, which is historical temple. Moreover, it is a tourist place where people come to enjoy the mansoon season and greenery of mountains.

== History ==
Sikar had been the biggest Thikana (Estate) of the Jaipur state. Previously Sikar was known as Shekhawati pradesh. It was the capital of Thikana Sikar. Sikar is surrounded by fortified walls consisting of seven "Pols" (gates). These historic gates are named: Bawari Gate, Fatehpuri Gate, Nani Gate, Surajpole Gate, Dujod Gate Old, Dujod Gate New, and Chandpole Gate.

== Geography and climate ==
=== Geography ===
Sikar city is the district headquarters of Rajasthan's Sikar district, which is situated in the eastern part of Rajasthan. It is the sixth most populous city of Rajasthan. It is located at27.62°N 75.15°E. It has an average elevation of 427 metres (1,401 ft).

=== Climate ===
Climate data for Sikar (1991–2020, extremes 1946–2009)
Month	Jan	Feb	Mar	Apr	May	Jun	Jul	Aug	Sep	Oct	Nov	Dec	Year
Record high °C (°F)	31.4 (88.5)	37.4 (99.3)	45.0 (113.0)	45.5 (113.9)	49.0 (120.2)	49.7 (121.5)	44.4 (111.9)	41.1 (106.0)	40.0 (104.0)	41.0 (105.8)	37.8 (100.0)	32.5 (90.5)	49.7 (121.5)
Mean daily maximum °C (°F)	21.8 (71.2)	24.7 (76.5)	30.3 (86.5)	36.5 (97.7)	39.5 (103.1)	39.9 (103.8)	35.0 (95.0)	33.3 (91.9)	33.9 (93.0)	32.8 (91.0)	27.8 (82.0)	22.6 (72.7)	31.5 (88.7)
Mean daily minimum °C (°F)	5.9 (42.6)	9.1 (48.4)	15.2 (59.4)	20.3 (68.5)	25.5 (77.9)	27.0 (80.6)	25.5 (77.9)	24.6 (76.3)	23.5 (74.3)	18.3 (64.9)	12.0 (53.6)	6.9 (44.4)	17.8 (64.0)
Record low °C (°F)	−3.0 (26.6)	−4.2 (24.4)	1.3 (34.3)	7.0 (44.6)	10.1 (50.2)	11.9 (53.4)	15.1 (59.2)	16.9 (62.4)	13.1 (55.6)	5.4 (41.7)	0.0 (32.0)	−4.9 (23.2)	−4.9 (23.2)
Average rainfall mm (inches)	3.6 (0.14)	4.8 (0.19)	1.7 (0.07)	4.2 (0.17)	10.4 (0.41)	94.4 (3.72)	202.8 (7.98)	165.8 (6.53)	69.7 (2.74)	10.7 (0.42)	2.1 (0.08)	1.4 (0.06)	511.6 (20.14)
Average rainy days	0.5	0.4	0.2	0.4	1.1	2.8	5.8	5.0	2.2	0.3	0.2	0.1	19.0
Average relative humidity (%) (at 17:30 IST)	52	42	37	34	35	42	56	59	53	39	38	40	44
Source: India Meteorological Department

== Demographics ==
Religion in Sikar (2011)
Religion	Percent
Hinduism	56.26%
Islam	42.43%
Jainism	0.80%
Other or not stated	0.51%
Distribution of religions

Sikar City had a population of about 244,497 people according to the final results of the census of 2011. As per provisional reports of Census India, the population of Sikar in 2011 is 237,579; of which there are approximately 123,156 males and 114,423 females. The sex ratio of Sikar City is 929 females per 1000 males. Regarding education, total literates in Sikar city are 158,413 of which 91,403 are males while 67,010 are females. The average literacy rate of Sikar City is 77.13, male and female literacy status is 86.29 and 67.37, respectively. The total population of children (0–6) in Sikar City is about 32,189, consisting of 17,236 boys and 14,953 girls. The child sex ratio of girls is 868 per 1000 boys.

Languages of Sikar (2011)
1. Rajasthani (68.0%)
2. Urdu (14.8%)
3. Hindi (9.54%)
4. Marwari (7.11%)
5. Others (0.63%)

At the time of the 2011 census, 67.96% of the population recorded their language as Rajasthani, 14.76% Urdu, 9.54% Hindi and 7.11% Marwari as their first language.

== Popular places ==
Sikar, a city rich in cultural heritage, offers several fascinating places to visit:

- Khatu Shyam Temple: A renowned pilgrimage site, this temple is dedicated to Lord Krishna’s incarnation, Khatu Shyam Ji. It attracts devotees from all parts of the country.
- Harshnath Temple: Located about 11 kilo-meters from Sikar, this ancient temple dedicated to Lord Shiva dates back to 973 CE. It offers a hilly area scene with historical significance.
- Lachhmangarh Fort: built by Rao Raja Laxman Singh in 1805.
- Nehru Park: One of the largest parks in Sikar.
- Smriti van: one of the biggest park
- Bheruji Temple, Reengus: A renowned pilgrimage site dedicated to Lord Bhairava.

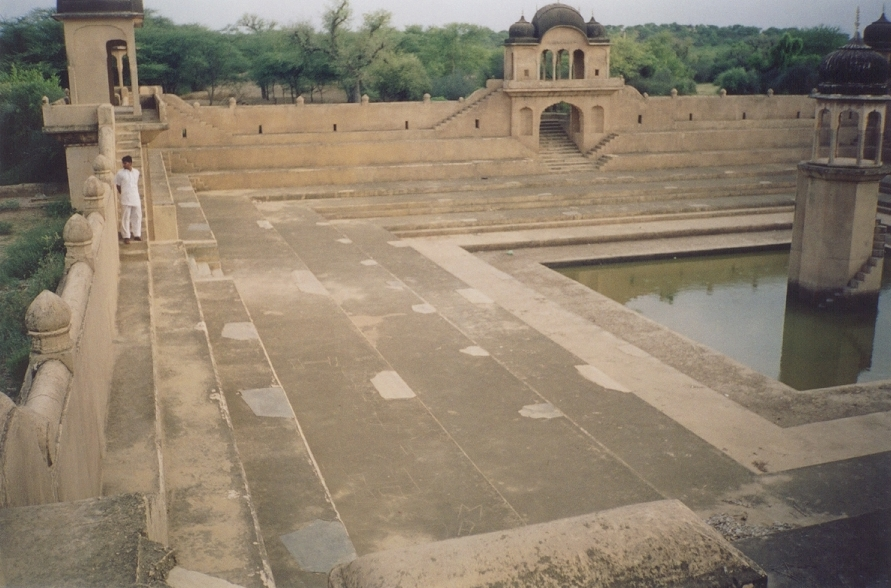
Bawdi at Fatehpur

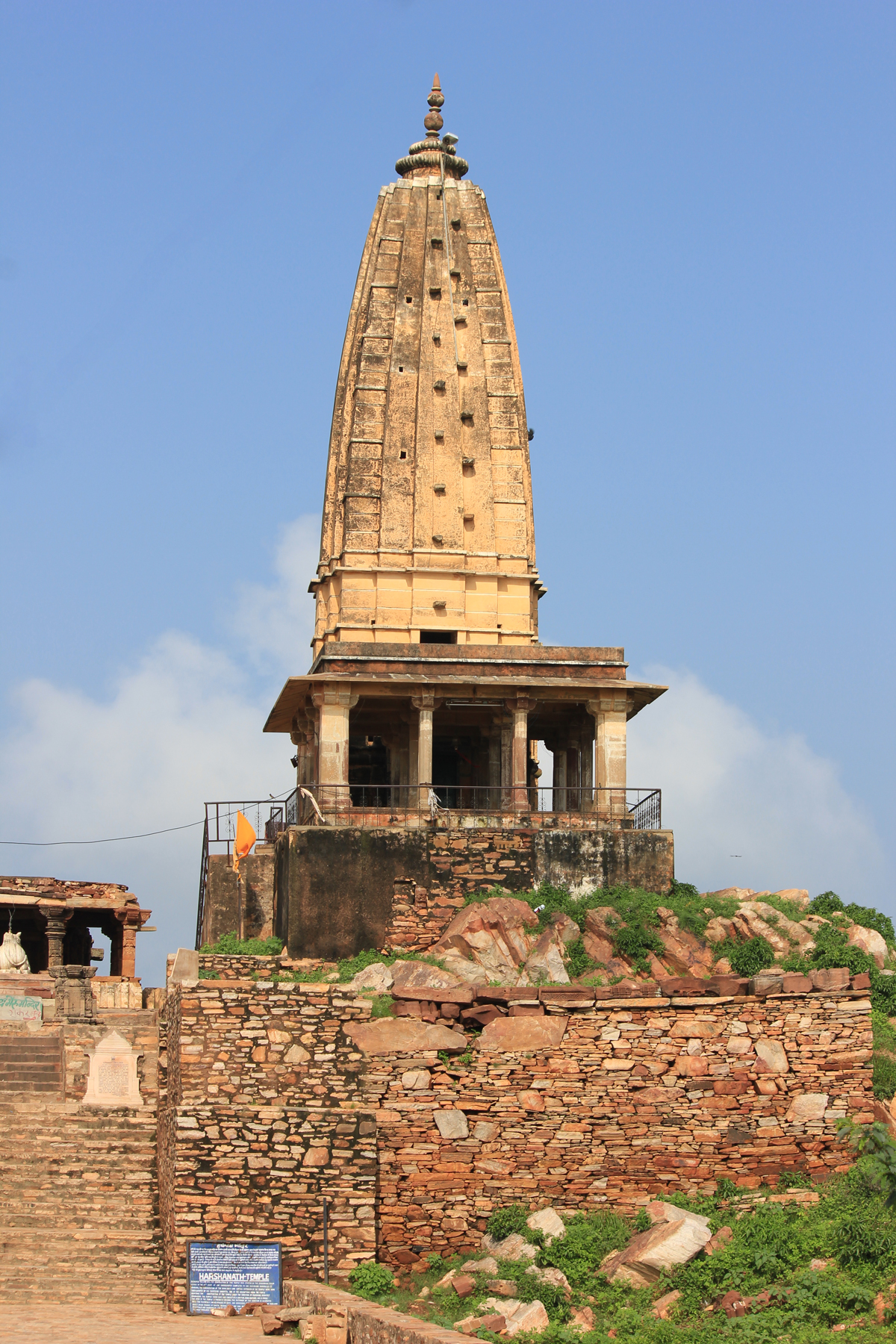
Harshnath Temple, Sikar, made in 973 AD

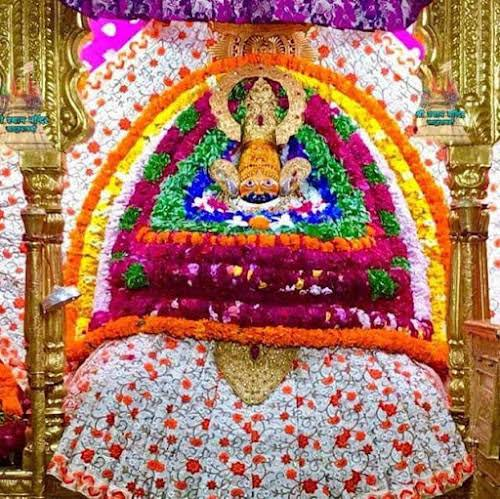
Khatu Shyam Temple in Khatoo village, Sikar district

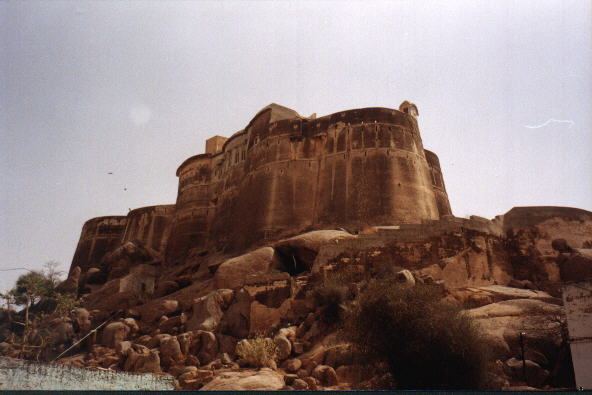
Laxmangarh Fort, Rajasthan, built in 1862 AD

== Administration ==
Sikar city is governed by a Municipal Council, which comes under the Sikar Urban Agglomeration. The new municipal council building is built in Shekhawati style like a mahal or haveli. Sikar city is divided into 60 wards. Although Sikar city has a population of 237,579 (in 2011), its urban/metropolitan population is 244,563 (in 2011). The Sikar metropolitan area includes Chandrapura (Rural), Radhakrishnpura, Samarthpura, Shivsinghpura and Sikar city.

== Education ==
Sikar has emerged as a significant educational hub, particularly for competitive exam preparation. The city of Sikar hosts numerous coaching institutes that offer specialized training for medical and engineering entrance exams such as NEET and IIT-JEE, attracting students from rural areas and neighbouring states, including Haryana, Uttar Pradesh. This approach has been associated with lower stress levels compared to other coaching hubs like Kota.

Sikar is home to Pandit Deendayal Upadhyaya Shekhawati University, which offers higher education programs in various fields. Additionally, government colleges in Sikar provide undergraduate and postgraduate courses in arts, sciences, and commerce, while private institutions contribute significantly to the educational landscape. Notable private institutes include Mody University of Science and Technology in Laxmangarh, which focuses on women’s education, and Bhartiya and Sobhasaria Engineering Colleges. A Government Polytechnic College also operates in the district.

Sikar is also home to Shri Kalyan Government Medical College, a tertiary medical institution offering Bachelor of Medicine and Surgery (MBBS) and postgraduate courses.

Sikar has gained recognition for its success in medical entrance exams, with several students achieving high ranks in NEET, including All India Rank 1 in 2024. In the field of engineering, Sikar achieved its highest rank to date in the IIT-JEE (Advanced) examination, securing All India Rank 11 in 2016.

In NEET UG 2025, Mahesh Kumar of Hanumangarh got All India Rank 1 with 686 marks out of 720, and topped the exam while studying at a private coaching institute in Sikar.

== Forts in Sikar District ==
- Devgarh Fort
- Laxmangarh Fort
- Raghunath Fort
- Danta Fort
- Ramgarh Fort
- Raiwasa Fort
- Badal Mahal Patan
- Roopgarh
- Shyamgarh
- Chota Pana Fort Khandela
- Ajitgarh
- Khachariyawas Fort
- Fatehpur Fort
- Khandela Bada Fort
- Mundru Fort
- Sirohi Sikar Fort
- Dansroli Fort Danta Ramgarh
- Ranoli Gadh
- Gadh Guhala Sikar
- Baral Fort Ranoli Sikar
- Dhod Fort
- Hameergarh (Hameerpura)
- Deeppura Rajaji Fort
- Aloda Fort
- Patoda Fort
- Kasalgarh
- Saladipura Fort
- Losal Citadel
- Sihot Badi Fort
- Bhathot Fort
- Garh Taknet
- Sujawas Fort
- Pachar Fort
- Vijaypura Fort Srimadhopur
- Ringas Fort Srimadhopur
- Thoi Fort
- Choukari Fort
- Garoda Fort
- Jajod Fort
- Surera Fort
- Khoor Fort
- Sami Fort
- Bajyawas Fort
- Singrawat Fort
- Singhasan Fort
- Sarwari Fort

== Notable persons ==
=== Politicians ===
- Narayan Singh Burdak - RPCC Chief and former minister in Government of Rajasthan
- Govind Singh Dotasra - RPCC Chief and former minister in Government of Rajasthan
- Mahadeo Singh Khandela - former union minister in Government of India
- Banshidhar Bajiya - former minister in Government of Rajasthan
- Bhairon Singh Shekhawat - 11th vice president of India
- Subhash Maharia - former union minister in Government of India
- Amra Ram - MP from Sikar
- Jhabhar Singh Kharra - minister in Government of Rajasthan

=== Businesspeople ===
- Jamnalal Bajaj - founder of the Bajaj Group

=== Sportspeople ===
- Arjun Lal Jat, Indian rower
- Bajrang Lal Takhar, Indian rower
- Radhey Shyam, Indian basketball player
- Aditya Garhwal, Indian Cricketer

=== Others ===
- Swami Keshwanand - Indian freedom fighter and social reformer
- Digendra Kumar - Mahavir Chakra recipient for bravery in Kargil War
- Himani Shah - Princess of Sikar (now Former Crown Princess of Nepal)
- Priyan Sain - Indian beauty pageant titleholder
- Jamnalal Bajaj- industrialist and freedom fighter
- Lothoo Nitharwal - freedom fighter
- Roop Kanwar - victim of sati practice
- Sobhagya Singh Shekhawat - Rajasthani language writer

== Modes of transportation ==
=== Rail ===
Sikar Junction railway station comes within the territory of the North Western Railway. Sikar City is connected to Jhunjhunu, Rewari, Delhi, Churu, Bikaner, Sri Ganganagar, Hisar, Jaipur, Kota, Ajmer, Udaipur, Abu Road, Indore, Ahmedabad and Mumbai, Mathura, PrayagrajAlwar. New lines proposed since 2010 are Sikar to Nokha via Sujangarh and Sikar to Neem-Ka-Thana via Udaipurwati.

=== Road ===
Sikar is well connected by roads from all the major cities of Rajasthan and nearby states. A four-lane national highway NH-52 passes through the city. NH-52 connects Sikar with Jaipur and Bikaner. The western freight corridor also pass through Ringas of Sikar, as a main project of the central government. Kotputali Kuchaman Mega Highway also passes through Sikar. Jhunjhunu-Jaipur state highway is also passes through Sikar.

=== Airport ===
The nearest airport to Sikar City is Jaipur International Airport, which operates daily flights to Delhi, Mumbai, Hyderabad, Bangalore, Pune, Indore, Ahmedabad, Chennai, Guwahati, Kolkata, Udaipur, Dubai, Sharjah, and Muscat. A new airport is proposed at Shahpura (a town in Jaipur district) that is very close to Sikar. A small air strip at Tarpura village is also available for the landing of small private planes against payment.

== See also ==
- Sikar district
- Sikar (Lok Sabha constituency)
- Sikar (Rajasthan Assembly constituency)
