= Sikar district =

- District
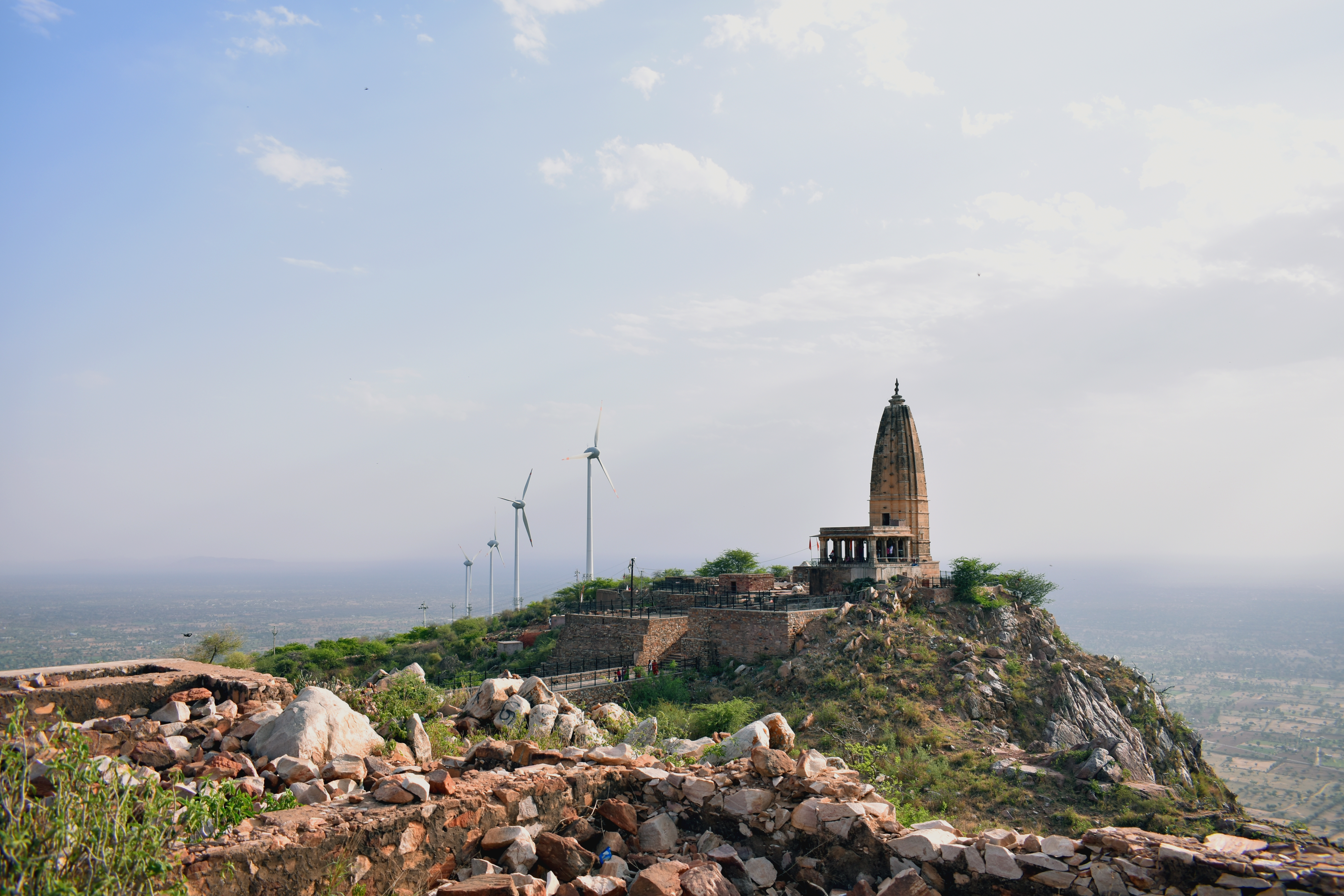
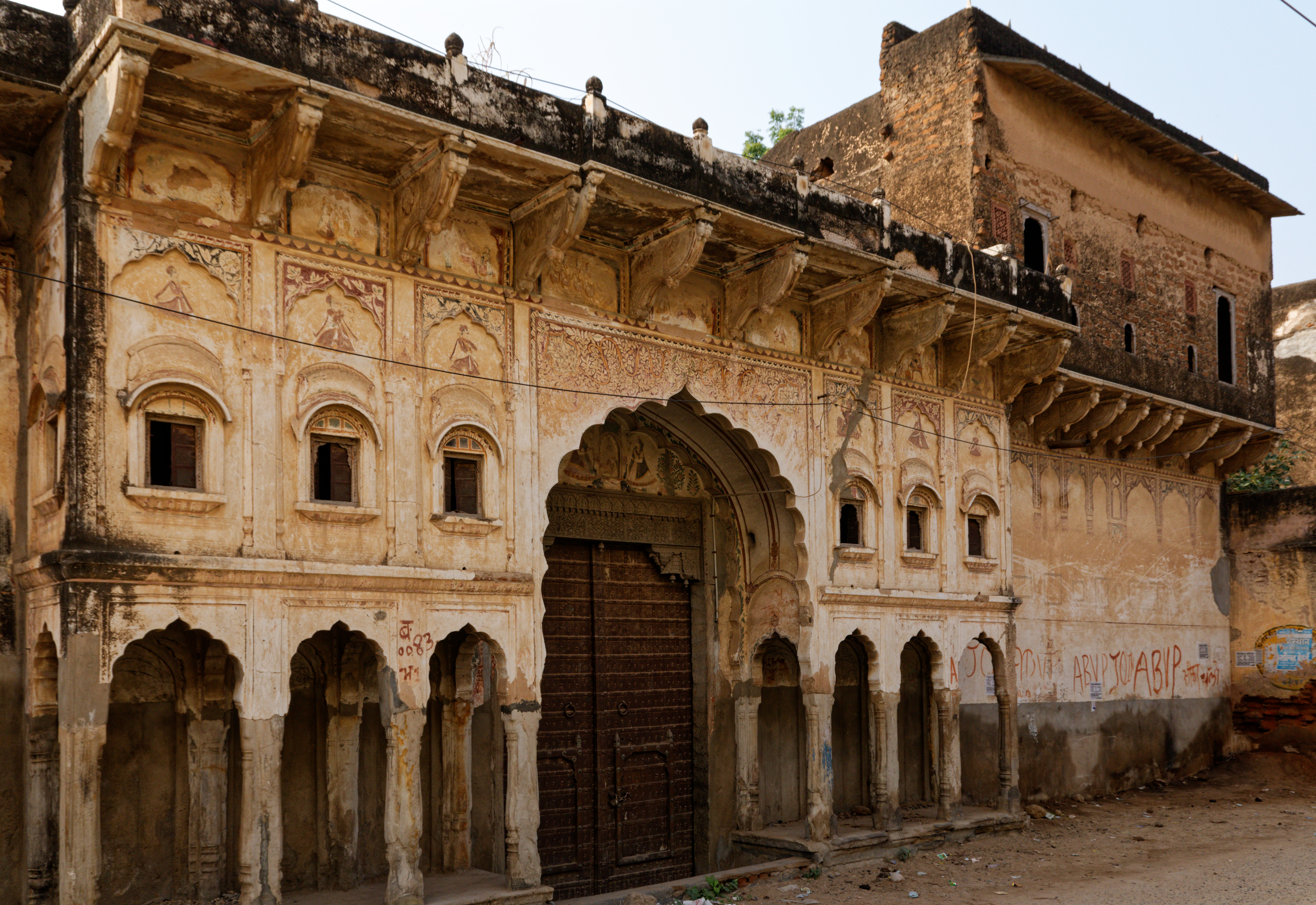
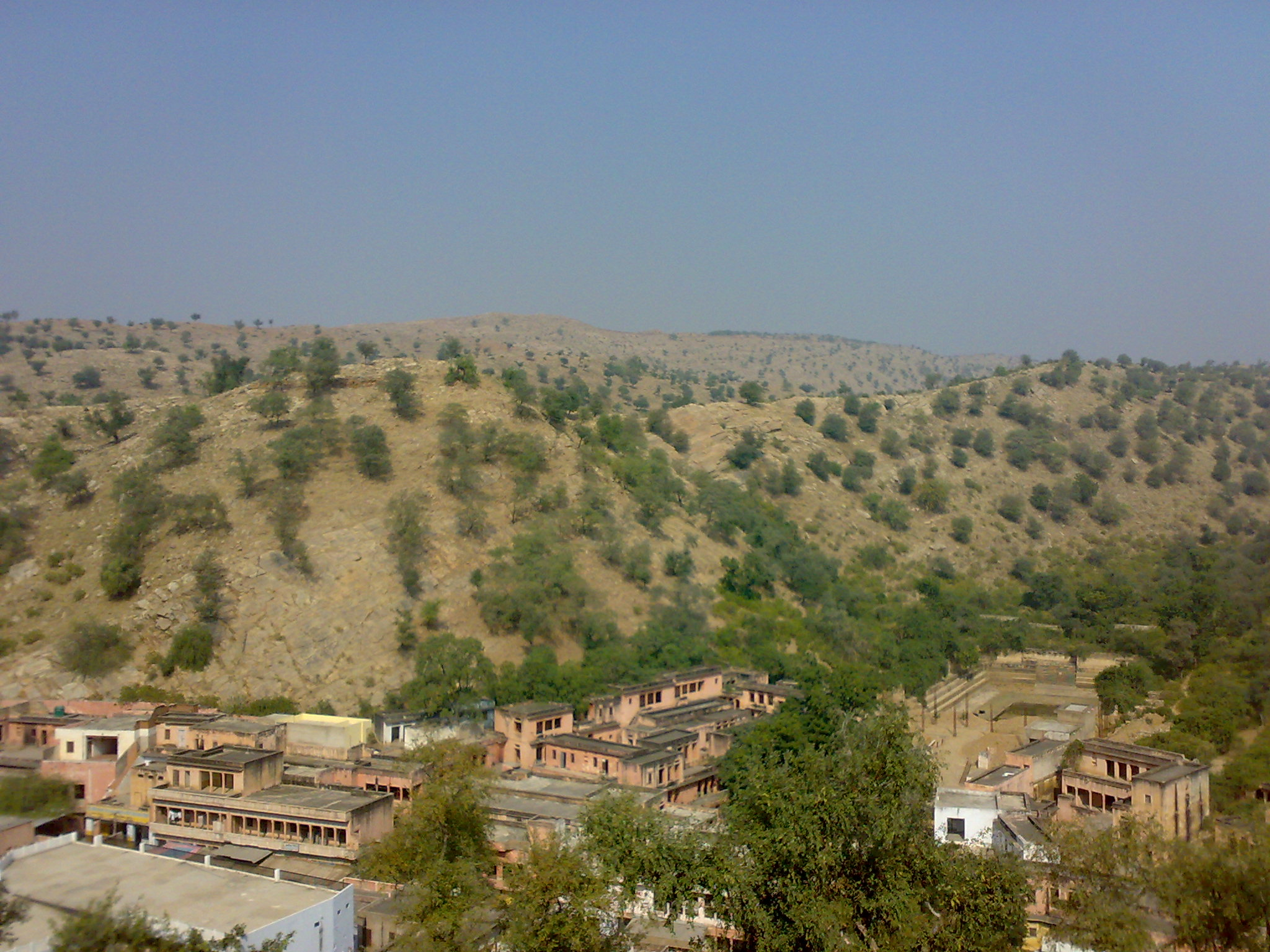
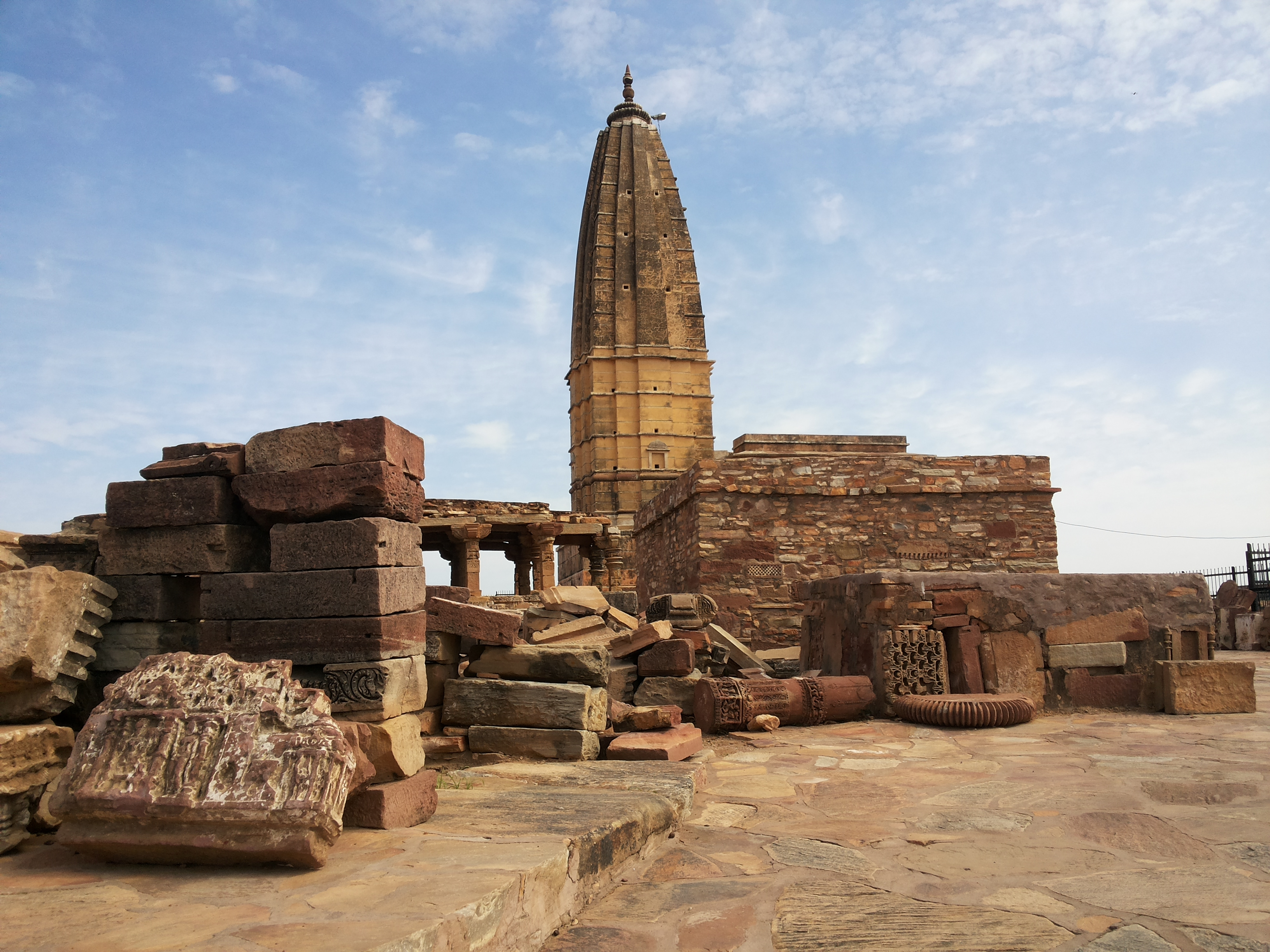
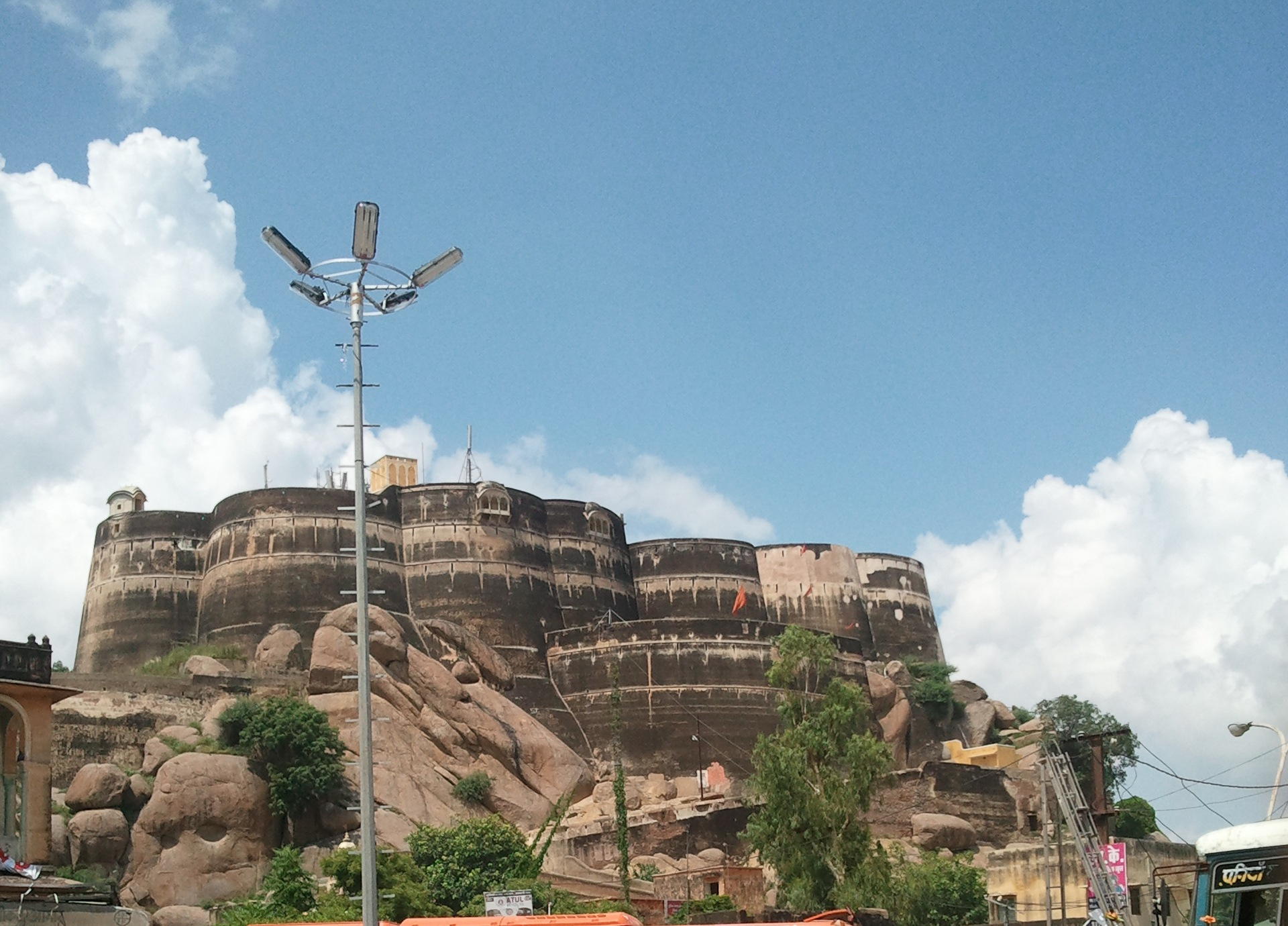
- Clockwise from top-left: Harshnath Temple, Ganesh Haveli in Fatehpur, Harsh Bhairav Mandir, Laxmangarh Fort, Jeen Mata hill

- Location of Sikar district in Rajasthan
- Coordinates (Sikar): 27.21°N 74.44°E - 28.12°N 75.25°E
- Country: India
- State: Rajasthan
- Division: Sikar
- Headquarters: Sikar
- Tehsils: 1. Sikar; 2. Fatehpur; 3. Lachhmangarh; 4. Dantaramgarh; 5. Dhod; 6. Ramgarh; 7. Ringus; 8. Neem ka thana; 9. patan

Government
  - District Collector & Magistrate: Mukul Sharma, IAS
  - Member of the Lok Sabha: Amra Ram, CPI (M)

Area
  - Total: 7,732 km^{2} (2,985 sq mi)

Population (2011)
  - Total: 2,677,333
  - Density: 346.3/km^{2} (896.8/sq mi)

Demographics
  - Literacy: 71.91
  - Sex ratio: 947
- Time zone: UTC+05:30 (IST)
- Vehicle registration: RJ 23
- Major highways: NH-52, State Highway 8
- Average annual precipitation: 469.8 mm
- Website: Sikar District

Sikar district is a district of the Indian state Rajasthan in northern India. It is a part of the Shekhawati region of Rajasthan. Rao Daulat Singh laid down the foundation stone of Thikana Sikar in 1687. District Collector of Sikar is Shri Mukul Sharma while Member of Parliament is Shri Amra Ram. The district headquarters is Sikar.

== Cities and towns ==
=== Cities ===
- Sikar
- Laxmangarh
- Fatehpur
- Khandela

=== Large towns ===
- Laxmangarh
- Reengus
- Losal
- Khatu
- Ramgarh
- Palsana

== Location ==
The district is located in the north-eastern part of the state of Rajasthan. It is bounded on the north by Jhunjhunu district, in the north-west by Churu district, in the south-west by Didwana Kuchaman district, in the south-east by Jaipur Rural district.

The district has an area of 5191.44 km^{2} and a population of 16,94,094 (2011 census, excluding NeemKaThana and Sri Madhopur). Sikar, Churu district and Jhunjhunu district's comprise the Shekhawati region of Rajasthan. The old name of Sikar was "Veer Bhan Ka Bas".

Longitude	74.44 degree to 75.25 degree
Latitude	East 27.21 degree to 28.12 degree North

== Demographics ==
Historical population
Year	Pop.	±% p.a.
1901	466,624	—
1911	469,440	+0.06%
1921	462,595	−0.15%
1931	521,159	+1.20%
1941	614,584	+1.66%
1951	676,318	+0.96%
1961	820,286	+1.95%
1971	1,042,648	+2.43%
1981	1,377,245	+2.82%
1991	1,842,914	+2.96%
2001	2,287,788	+2.19%
2011	2,677,333	+1.58%

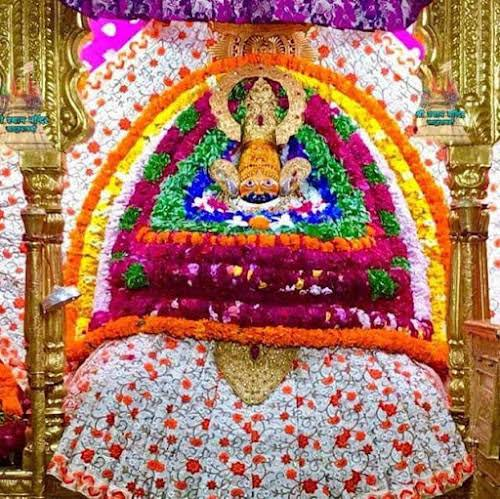
Khatu Shyam Temple in Khatoo village, Sikar district

Religion in Sikar district (2011)
Religion	Percent
Hinduism	87.48%
Islam	12.24%
Other	0.28%

According to the 2011 census Sikar district has a population of 1,694,094, roughly equal to the nation of Equatorial Guinea or the US state of Nevada. This gives it a ranking of 150th in India (out of a total of 640). The district has a population density of 330 inhabitants per square kilometre (850/sq mi). Its population growth rate over the decade 2001-2011 was 17.04%. Sikar has a sex ratio of 944 females for every 1000 males, and a literacy rate of 72.98%. 23.68% of the population lives in urban areas. Scheduled Castes and Scheduled Tribes make up 15.64% and 2.81% of the population respectively.

=== Languages ===
Languages in Sikar district (2011)
1. Rajasthani (92.6%)
2. Hindi (2.78%)
3. Marwari (1.94%)
4. Urdu (1.94%)
5. Others (0.64%)

At the time of the 2011 census, 92.60% of the population spoke Rajasthani, 2.78% Hindi, 1.94% Marwari and 1.94% Urdu as their first language.

== Climate ==
The district has a hot semi-arid climate (Köppen climate classification: BSh), with a hot and humid summer, rainfall confined into the monsoon season, a chilly winter season and a general dryness of the air, except in the brief yet abundant monsoon season. The maximum and minimum temperatures are 47 to 48 and 1 to 0 degrees Celsius, respectively. The average temperature around the year is about 35 degrees Celsius. The normal rainfall, mostly received from the southwest monsoon, is 469.8 mm.

== Education ==
Sikar district has become a hub for education in Rajasthan state. Pandit Deendayal Upadhyaya Shekhawati University situated in the Sikar. Along with government, private colleges providing arts, sciences, and commerce education. Mody Institute of Technology and Science, in Lakshmangarh town imparts girls' education. Bhartiya and Sobhasaria Engineering College is another college in the district. There is only One Government Polytechnic College in Sikar district.

The district is also an emerging hub of coaching IIT-JEE and NEET. Here, some institutes provide coaching for engineering and medical exams. Sikar is the smallest city which has IIT JEE Advance centre. Shri Kalyan Medical College, Sikar, College is a tertiary Medical college in Sikar, Rajasthan, India. Sikar, a small yet academically vibrant city in Rajasthan, has recently made headlines for producing the highest number of selections in the prestigious NEET exam.

In NEET UG 2025, Mahesh Kumar of Hanumangarh got All India Rank 1 with 686 marks out of 720, and topped the exam while studying at a Private coaching institute in Sikar.

== Administration ==
=== Sub divisions, tehsils, sub tehsils, panchayat samitis and villages ===
Total sub divisions	9 (Sikar, Fatehpur, Laxmangarh, Dantaramgarh, Khandela, Nechhwa, Reengus, Ramgarh Sethan, Dhod Assembly constituency)
Total tehsils	10(Sikar, Fatehpur, Laxmangarh, Dantaramgarh, Khandela, Nechhwa, Sikar Gramin, Reengus, Ramgarh Sethan, Dhod Assembly constituency)
Total sub tehsils	2 Palsana, Losal
Blocks (Panchyat Samitis)	8 (Dhod Assembly constituency, Piprali, Fatehpur, Laxmangarh, Dantaramgarh, Khandela, Nechhwa, Palsana, Rajasthan)
Total villages	1183

=== Local bodies ===
Total Gram Panchayat	645
Total Nagar-Palika	7 Ramgarh Sethan, Khatu, Reengus, Danta, Losal, Khandela, Laxmangarh,
Total Nagar-Parishad	2 Sikar, Fatehpur

=== Police ===
Total Police-Thana	23
Police-Chowki	27
Jails (prisons)	333

== Villages ==
- Sigdola Chhota
- Ajeetpura
- Dhod
- Piprali
- Sewad Bari

== Temples ==
- Khatu Shyam Temple
- Harshnath Temple
- Jeenmata
- Shakambhari
