= Sikar Lok Sabha constituency =

Lok Sabha constituency in Rajasthan

Coordinates: 27.6°N 75.2°E

Sikar
- Lok Sabha constituency
- Interactive Map Outlining Sikar Lok Sabha Constituency

Constituency details
- Country: India
- Region: North India
- State: Rajasthan
- Assembly constituencies: Lachhmangarh; Dhod; Sikar; Danta Ramgarh; Khandela; Neem Ka Thana; Srimadhopur; Chomu
- Established: 1952
- Reservation: None

Member of Parliament
- 18th Lok Sabha
- Incumbent Amra Ram
- Party: CPI(M)
- Alliance: INDIA
- Elected year: 2024
- Preceded by: Sumedhanand Saraswati

Sikar (Hindi pronunciation: [siːkəɾ]) is one of the 25 Lok Sabha (parliamentary) constituencies in Rajasthan state in India. Amra Ram is incumbent member of the Lok Sabha from Sikar.

== Assembly segments ==
Number of Parties which represented Sikar Lok Sabha constituency
1. INC (7 terms) (38.9%)
2. BJP (5 terms) (27.8%)
3. CPI(M) (1 term) (5.56%)
4. BJS (1 term) (5.56%)
5. JD (1 term) (5.56%)
6. JP (1 term) (5.56%)
7. JP(S) (1 term) (5.56%)
8. RRP (1 term) (5.56%)

Presently, Sikar Lok Sabha constituency comprises eight Vidhan Sabha (legislative assembly) segments. These are:

#	Name	District	Member	Party	2024 Lead
33	Lachhmangarh	Sikar	Govind Singh Dotasra	INC	CPI(M)
34	Dhod (SC)	Sikar	Gordhan Verma	BJP	CPI(M)
35	Sikar	Sikar	Rajendra Pareek	INC	CPI(M)
36	Danta Ramgarh	Sikar	Virendra Singh Burdak	INC	CPI(M)
37	Khandela	Sikar	Subhash Meel	BJP	CPI(M)
38	Neem Ka Thana	Sikar	Suresh Modi	INC	CPI(M)
39	Srimadhopur	Sikar	Jhabar Singh Kharra	BJP	BJP
43	Chomu	Jaipur	Shikha Meel Barala	INC	BJP

== Members of Parliament ==
Year	Member	Party
1952	Nandlal Sharma	Ram Rajya Parishad
1957	Rameshwar Tantia	Indian National Congress
1962	Rameshwar Tantia	Indian National Congress
1967	Gopal Saboo	Bharatiya Jana Sangh
1971	Shrikrishan Modi	Indian National Congress
1977	Jagdish Prasad Mathur	Janata Party
1980	Kumbha Ram Arya	Janata Party (Secular)
1984	Balram Jakhar	Indian National Congress
1989	Choudhary Devi Lal	Janata Dal
1991	Balram Jakhar	Indian National Congress
1996	Dr. Hari Singh Choudhary	Indian National Congress
1998	Subhash Maharia	Bharatiya Janata Party
1999	Subhash Maharia	Bharatiya Janata Party
2004	Subhash Maharia	Bharatiya Janata Party
2009	Mahadeo Singh Khandela	Indian National Congress
2014	Sumedhanand Saraswati	Bharatiya Janata Party
2019	Sumedhanand Saraswati	Bharatiya Janata Party
2024	Amra Ram	Communist Party of India (Marxist)

== Election results ==
Vote share of Winning candidates
2024	50.68%
2019	58.19%
2014	47.12%
2009	44.78%
2004	47.15%
1999	45.56%
1998	37.24%
1996	43.71%
1991	52.30%
1989	51.84%
1984	52.46%
1980	34.42%
1977	66.16%
1971	55.84%
1967	35.91%
1962	34.94%
1957	42.40%
1951	39.49%

=== 2024 ===
2024 Indian general election: Sikar
Party	Candidate	Votes	%	±%
CPI(M)	Amra Ram	659,300	50.68	▲48.31
BJP	Sumedhanand Saraswati	586,404	45.08	▼13.11
BSP	Amarchand	8,619	0.66	N/A
NOTA	None of the above	7,266	0.56	▼0.03
Majority		72,896	5.60	▼16.80
Turnout		13,00,856	58.73	▼6.45
CPI(M) gain from BJP		Swing		

=== 2019 ===
2019 Indian general elections: Sikar
Party	Candidate	Votes	%	±%
BJP	Swami Sumedhanand Saraswati	772,104	58.19	▲11.07
INC	Subhash Maharia	4,74,948	35.79	▲11.24
CPI(M)	Amra Ram	31,462	2.37	▼2.64
Bhartiya Jan Satta Party	Vijendra Kumar	12,416	0.94	N/A
Margin of victory		2,97,156	22.40	▼0.17
Turnout		13,30,621	65.18	▲4.87
BJP hold		Swing	▲11.07	

=== 2014 ===
2014 Indian general elections: Sikar
Party	Candidate	Votes	%	±%
BJP	Swami Sumedhanand Saraswati	499,428	47.12	▲22.93
INC	Pratap Singh Jat	2,60,232	24.55	▼20.23
IND.	Subhash Maharia	1,88,841	17.81	▲17.81
CPI(M)	Amra Ram	53,134	5.01	▼17.27
AAP	Major Surendra Kumar Punia	15,666	1.47	▲1.47
BSP	Gulab Nazi Azad	4,112	0.38	▼3.80
Majority		2,39,196	22.57	▲7.66
Turnout		10,67,462	60.31	▲7.34
BJP gain from INC		Swing	▲22.93	

=== 2009 ===
2009 Indian general elections: Sikar
Party	Candidate	Votes	%	±%
INC	Mahadeo Singh Khandela	324,832	44.78	▲4.64
BJP	Subhash Maharia	1,75,386	24.18	▼22.97
CPI(M)	Amra Ram	1,61,590	22.28	▲13.78
Independent	Mahesh kumar	8,163	1.12	N/A
BSP	Bharat Singh Tanwar	30,374	4.18	▲3.14
Majority		1,49,426	20.60	14.91
Turnout		7,25,287	48.10	
INC gain from BJP		Swing	▲4.64	

=== 2004 ===
2004 Indian general elections: Sikar
Party	Candidate	Votes	%	±%
BJP	Subhash Maharia	367,546	47.15	▲1.59
INC	Narayan Singh	3,12,863	40.14	▼1.66
CPI(M)	Amra Ram	66,241	8.50	▼2.24
BSP	Ramesh Chandra Sharma	8,072	1.04	▲0.55
Majority		54,683	7.01	▲3.25
Turnout		7,79,471	52.84	▲5.69
BJP hold		Swing	▲1.59	

=== 1999 ===
1999 Indian general election: Sikar
Party	Candidate	Votes	%	±%
BJP	Subhash Maharia	341,445	45.56	
INC	Balram	313,272	41.80	
CPI(M)	Amra Ram	80,491	10.74	
Independent	Ajaypal	5,435	0.73	
SP	Ramswarup	3,909	0.52	
BSP	Mohd. Umarddin	3,643	0.49	
Independent	Shashikant	1,209	0.16	
Majority		28,173	3.76	
Turnout		755,202	58.53	
BJP hold		Swing		

=== 1998 ===
1998 Indian general election: Sikar
Party	Candidate	Votes	%	±%
BJP	Subhash Mahariya	293,502	37.24	
INC	Hari Singh	252,180	32.00	
CPI(M)	Amra Ram	196,432	24.92	
AIRJP	Chatar Singh	20,268	2.57	
BSP	Manohar Singh	11,506	1.46	
Independent	Ajay Pal	6,039	0.77	
Independent	Vinod Kumar Yadav	2,962	0.38	
RJD	Devi Sahai	2,761	0.35	
Independent	Ram Lal	1,426	0.18	
AJBP	Shashi Kant	1,039	0.13	
Majority		41,322	5.24	
Turnout		796,943	64.07	
Swing to BJP from INC		Swing		

=== 1996 ===
1996 Indian general election: Sikar
Party	Candidate	Votes	%	±%
INC	Hari Singh	264,523	43.71	
BJP	Subhash Maharia	226,514	37.43	
CPI(M)	Amara Ram	56,452	9.33	
JD	Narendra Shekhawat Mundru	11,789	1.95	
Independent	27 Independent Candidates	38,718	6.39	
Others	4 Other Party Candidates	7,218	1.20	
Majority		38,009	6.28	
Turnout				
INC hold		Swing		

=== 1991 ===
1991 Indian general election: Sikar
Party	Candidate	Votes	%	±%
INC	Balram	323,153	52.30	
BJP	Harlal Singh Kharra	212,468	34.39	
JD	Dilsukh Rai	58,418	9.45	
Independent	16 Independent Candidates	20,438	3.31	
Others	2 Other Party Candidates	3,428	0.55	
Majority		110,685	17.91	
Turnout				
Swing to INC from BJP		Swing		

=== 1989 ===
1989 Indian general election: Sikar
Party	Candidate	Votes	%	±%
JD	Devi Lal	375,855	51.84	
INC	Balram	329,099	45.39	
Independent	15 Independent Candidates	17,011	2.34	
Others	2 Other Party Candidates	3,009	0.42	
Majority		46,756	6.45	
Turnout				
Swing to JD from INC		Swing		

=== 1984 ===
1984 Indian general election: Sikar
Party	Candidate	Votes	%	±%
INC	Bal Ram	292,132	52.46	
BJP	Ghanshyam Tiwari	112,573	20.22	
LKD	Gopal Singh	108,845	19.55	
JP	Alam Ali Khan	7,877	1.41	
Independent	13 Independent Candidates	35,424	6.36	
Majority		179,559	32.24	
Turnout				
Swing to INC from JP(S)		Swing		

=== 1980 ===
1980 Indian general election: Sikar
Party	Candidate	Votes	%	±%
JP(S)	Kumbha Ram Arya	153,218	34.42	
INC(I)	Shrikishna	119,086	26.75	
JP	Jagdish Prasad Mathur	112,975	25.38	
Independent	12 Independent Candidates	59,877	13.46	
Majority		34,132	7.67	
Turnout				
Swing to JP(S) from JP		Swing		

=== 1977 ===
1977 Indian general election: Sikar
Party	Candidate	Votes	%	±%
JP	Jagdish Prasad Mathur	256,672	66.16	
INC	Shri Kishan	99,479	25.64	
CPI(M)	Trilok Singh	24,199	6.24	
Ram Rajya Parishad	Tej Singh	7,612	1.96	
Majority		157,193	40.52	
Turnout		398,248	58.99	
Swing to JP from INC		Swing		

=== 1971 ===
1971 Indian general election: Sikar
Party	Candidate	Votes	%	±%
INC	Shrikishan	212,263	55.84	
ABJS	Surendra Kumar Taparia	78,354	20.61	
BKD	Moarka Radhe Shyam Ram Kumar	36,791	9.68	
CPI(M)	Trilok Singh	24,101	6.34	
Independent	10 Independent Candidates	28,651	7.54	
Majority		133,909	35.23	
Turnout				
Swing to INC from ABJS		Swing		

=== 1967 ===
1967 Indian general election: Sikar
Party	Candidate	Votes	%	±%
ABJS	S. Saboo	130,945	35.91	
INC	T. Rameshwar	110,837	30.40	
CPI(M)	T. Singh	70,659	19.38	
Independent	6 Independent Candidates	52,207	14.31	
Majority		20,108	5.51	
Turnout				
Swing to ABJS from INC		Swing		

=== 1962 ===
1962 Indian general election: Sikar
Party	Candidate	Votes	%	±%
INC	Rameshwarlal Tantia	88,826	34.94	
ABJS	Sagar Mal	55,719	21.92	
CPI	Trilok Singh	53,123	20.90	
Independent	Bansidhar Sharma	18,956	7.46	
Independent	Mahadeo	16,141	6.35	
Independent	Waras Khan	13,809	5.43	
Ram Rajya Parishad	Bhanwar Singh	7,654	3.01	
Majority		33,107	13.02	
Turnout		265,781	57.11	
INC hold		Swing		

=== 1957 ===
1957 Indian general election: Sikar
Party	Candidate	Votes	%	±%
INC	Rameshwar Tantia	84,163	42.40	
Independent	Sagar Mal	74,500	37.53	
CPI	Tirlok Singh	39,848	20.07	
Independent	Ballu	0	0.00	
Majority		9,663	4.87	
Turnout		198,511	49.42	
Swing to INC from Ram Rajya Parishad		Swing		

=== 1951 ===
1951 Indian general election: Sikar
Party	Candidate	Votes	%	±%
Ram Rajya Parishad	Nand Lal	52,980	39.49	
INC	Bajaj Kamal Nayan Jamna Lal	48,795	36.37	
KLP	Tilak Singh	32,383	24.14	
Majority		4,185	3.12	
Turnout		134,158	41.53	
Ram Rajya Parishad win (new seat)				

== See also ==
- Sikar district
- List of constituencies of the Lok Sabha
