= Amra Ram =

Indian politician

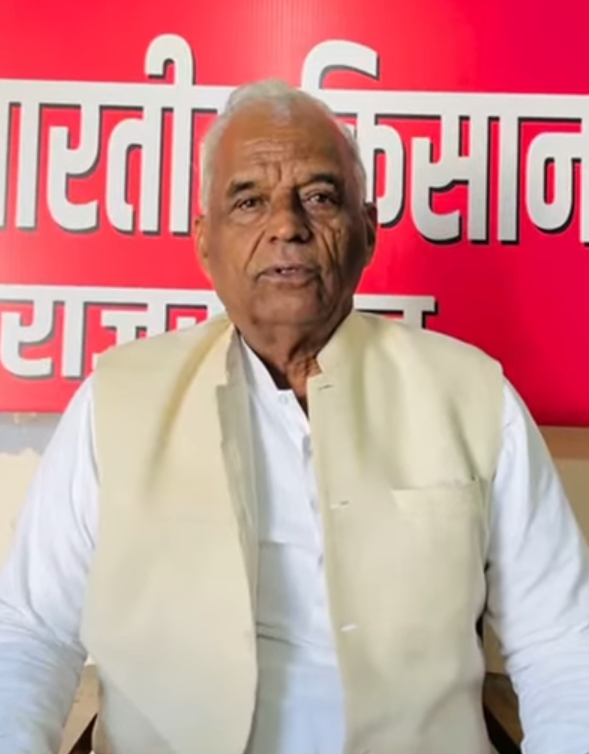

Member of Parliament, Lok Sabha
- Incumbent
- Assumed office 4 June 2024
- Preceded by: Sumedhanand Saraswati
- Constituency: Sikar

President of the All India Kisan Sabha
- In office 2013–2017
- Preceded by: S. Ramachandran Pillai
- Succeeded by: Ashok Dhawale

Member of the Rajasthan Legislative Assembly
- In office 1993–2008
- Preceded by: Ramdeo Singh
- Succeeded by: Pema Ram
- Constituency: Dhod
- In office 2008–2013
- Preceded by: Narain Singh
- Succeeded by: Narain Singh
- Constituency: Danta Ramgarh

Personal details
- Born: 5 August 1955 (age 71) Mundwara, Sikar, Rajasthan, India
- Party: Communist Party of India (Marxist)
- Education: Shri Kalyan Government College, University of Rajasthan
- Occupation: Politician and peasant leader

Amra Ram (born 5 August 1955; Hindi pronunciation: [əm.ɾaː ɾaːm]) is an Indian politician and peasant leader from Rajasthan. He is serving as the Member of Parliament, Lok Sabha from Sikar since 2024. He was elected to the Rajasthan Legislative Assembly for four-terms from 1993 to 2013. He served as president of the All India Kishan Sabha from July 2013 to October 2017. He is currently vice-president of All India Kishan Sabha since October 2017. A member of the Communist Party of India (Marxist), he has been the State Secretary of the CPI(M) Rajasthan unit and a CEC member of CPI(M) since 2014. He won the Best MLA award for the year 2011 from Rajasthan Government.

== Early life and education ==
He was born into a Jat family on 5 August 1955 to Rami Devi and Dallaram in Mundwara village, Sikar District, Rajasthan. His early education started at Govt. Primary School, Mundwara, followed by Govt. Shri Kalyan School for his higher secondary education. In 1973, he enrolled at Shri Kalyan Govt. College, where he obtained a B.Sc. degree. In 1976, he went to Gorakhpur University, earning a Bachelor of Education (B.Ed.) degree. Returning to Shri Kalyan Govt. College in 1979, he furthered his academic pursuits, culminating in an M.Com degree with a specialisation in EAFM (Economics, Accounting, and Financial Management).

He participated in the sport of kabaddi, playing for Rajasthan in the National Open Championship held in Simoga, Karnataka in 1971.

== Political career ==
=== Student politics ===
While studying in college, he joined the Students Federation of India (SFI), the student organisation of the Communist Party of India (Marxist). He was elected Students Union President of Shri Kalyan Govt. College under the banner of SFI in 1979. At that time, Shri Kalyan Govt. College was the second largest college in Rajasthan based on student's strength.

=== Indian mainstream politics ===
- Ram was elected Sarpanch of Mundwada twice from 1983 to 1993.
- In 1985, he contested for the first time for the legislator on CPI(M) ticket and stood in third place with 10281 votes.
- In 1993, he was elected Legislative Assembly Member for the first time, by defeating Congress's Ramdev Singh in the Assembly elections from Dhod constituency of Rajasthan Assembly.
- He was elected legislator (MLA) for three consecutive terms in the year 1993, 1998, and 2003 from Dhod.
- In 2008, he was elected Legislative Assembly Member for the fourth time, by defeating Congress's Narayan Singh in the Assembly elections from the Danta Ramgarh constituency of the Rajasthan Assembly. It was his fourth consecutive term in the Rajasthan Legislative Assembly on CPI(M) ticket.
- He lost the 2013 Assembly elections and stayed in third place, this time Narayan Singh of Congress won the seat.
- In 1996, he contested for the first time for Member of Parliament. He lost, receiving 56,452 votes in the Sikar constituency of Lok Sabha (Lower house of Indian Parliament), trailing in the third position behind Dr Hari Singh (INC candidate, winner) and Subhash Maharia (BJP candidate).
- Since 1996, he has contested for the Sikar Lok Sabha constituency seat seven times and won in 2024.

=== Role in Vidhan Sabha ===
He was elected to the Rajasthan Legislative Assembly for four terms. Amra Ram is known for bringing farmer issues to the notice of the Assembly.

- Farmers were agitating on 20 January 1997 for power supply for wells outside the Rajasthan assembly, Amra raised this demand of farmers in the House and sought a solution. However, this was not discussed before the Governor's address commenced. Amra Ram, however, disrupted the governor's address and insisted that if the assembly won't look after the well-being of the farmers, the assembly proceedings would/should be stopped. For this incident, Amra Ram and 4 other MLAs were suspended from the assembly for 3 months. At that time Baliram Bhagat was the Governor and Bhairun Singh Shekhawat was the Chief Minister of Rajasthan.
- As an MLA, Amra Ram always opposed the proposals for the increase in wages and allowances of legislators.
- Amra Ram opposed the proposal of the Legislative Council in Rajasthan and demanded a division of the house on the issue on 17 April 2012. He argued that doing so would give an additional burden of Rs 500 crore annually to the people of the state. The proposal of the Legislative Council passed in the division of assembly by majority. Ruling Party and opposition were in favour of the proposal, Amra Ram and 4 other MLAs were against the proposal.

== Movements ==
=== Sikar Kisan Movement 2017 ===
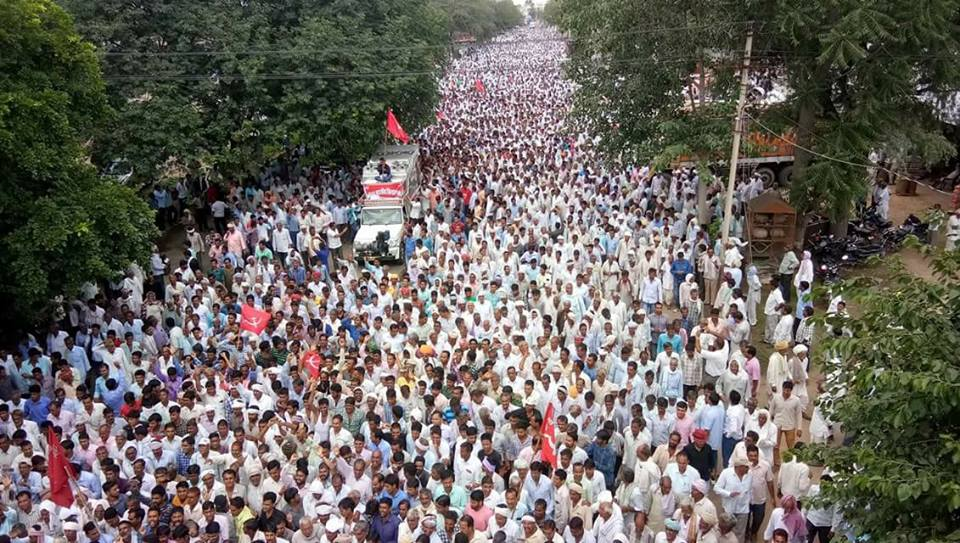
Sikar Kisan Andolan 2017

A large farmer's movement started in Rajasthan on 1 September 2017 to promote farmer's loan waivers, minimum support price and other demands under the leadership of Akhil Bhartiya Kishan Sabha (AIKS). Kisan Sabha, President, Amra Ram, Former MLA Pema Ram, Hetram Benwal, Pawan Duggal, Mangal Singh Yadav, Bhagirath Netar, Sagar Mal Khachariya and others were leading the movement. Sikar was the center of movement, so it is known as "Sikar Kisan Andolan". Thousands of farmers gathered in Sikar Mandhi on 1 September, and said their Padav would continue until demands were accepted. Kishan Padav (Hindi: किसान पड़ाव) continued in Sikar and Other Districts including Bikaner, Nagaur, Jhunjhunu, Churu, Hanumangarh, Shri Ganganagar, Alwar till 10 September. During this, government imposed Section 144 and also blocked Internet services in Sikar. When the demands were not accepted, on 10 September, AIKS called a Statewide Indefinite Highway Strike. After beginning from Sikar, this movement spread throughout Rajasthan, it had a widespread impact in 14 districts. Meanwhile, Sikar and other cities were also kept under strike. Traders and many organisations supported the Farmer's Movement. On the 11th day, on the call of the Kisan Sabha, the farmers blocked highways and all other major and minor roads. Then the government invited the delegation of farmers for the talks on 11 September. After two days of long talks the government accepted the demand of the farmers on 13 September. The movement was withdrawn after the demands were accepted.
