= Sumedhanand Saraswati =

Indian politician

Swami Sumedhanand Saraswati
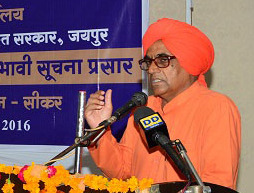
- Saraswati in 2016

Member of Parliament, Lok Sabha
- In office 1 September 2014 – 4 June 2024
- Preceded by: Mahadeo Singh Khandela
- Succeeded by: Amra Ram
- Constituency: Sikar

Personal details
- Born: 1 October 1951 (age 75) Rohtak, Punjab, India (present day Haryana)
- Party: Bharatiya Janata Party
- Education: Chaudhary Charan Singh University (M.A.)
- Profession: Social Service

Religious life
- Religion: Hinduism
- School: Arya Samaj
- Initiation: c.1974

Swami Sumedhanand Saraswati (born 1 October 1951) is an Indian politician. He served as Member of Lok Sabha for Sikar from 2014 to 2024. He belongs to Bharatiya Janata Party and is a member of Arya Samaj.

== Early life ==
Saraswati was born on 1 October 1951 in a Jat family to Maya Ram Arya and Bharti Devi at Rohtak, Punjab (presently Haryana). He received a postgraduation degree from Chaudhary Charan Singh University in Sanskrit.

== Spiritual career ==
Saraswati left home in c. 1974 and joined Arya Samaj. Saraswati is a sadhu (Hindu monk) and has also founded one vedic ashram. He is a former working president of Saarva Deshik Arya Pratinidhi Sabha, a Delhi based organization affiliated with Arya Samaj. Before entering politics, he has organised campaigns for cow protection and education of cultural tradition and Vedas.

== Political career ==
Ahead of the 2014 Indian general election, the Bharatiya Janata Party announced that on the demand of Baba Ramdev, Saraswati would contest from Sikar constituency. However, local party leaders protested as they considered him to be an outsider as he hailed from Haryana. His convoy was also attacked. In the election, he was pitted against Subhash Maharia, an independent candidate and rebel of his party. On 16 May 2014, he was elected to the Lok Sabha after defeating his nearest rival Pratap Singh Jat of Indian National Congress party by a margin of approximately 239,000 votes. In his election affidavit, Saraswati declared assets worth ₹34,311 (US$360), the least amongst other parliamentarians.

During his tenure as an MP, Saraswati spent ₹ 240 million (US$ 3,428,522) from his Members of Parliament Local Area Development Scheme fund for his constituency. He also raised an issue about onion cultivation in Lok Sabha.

== See also ==
- Arya Samajis
- Hindu reformists
