= First Shekhawat ministry =

- Ministry of Rajasthan
- Date formed: 22 June 1977
- Date dissolved: 16 February 1980

People and organisations
- Governor: Raghukul Tilak
- Chief Minister: Bhairon Singh Shekhawat
- Member party: Janata Party
- Status in legislature: Majority government

History
- Predecessor: Hari Dev Joshi ministry
- Successor: Jagannath Pahadia ministry

Bhairon Singh Shekhawat became Chief Minister of Rajasthan thrice. First time in 1977 when Janata Party won 151 of the 200 seats in the state assembly elections of Rajasthan and Shekhawat took over as the first non-Congress Chief Minister of Rajasthan. His government was dismissed by Indira Gandhi in 1980. He was chief minister again for the periods of 1990–1992 and 1993 to 1998. Here is the list of ministers in his first ministry (1977–80).

== Council of ministers ==
Name	Office	Took office	Left office	Party
Bhairon Singh Shekhawat	Chief Minister	22 June 1977	16 February 1980	Janata Party
Prof Kedar Nath	Cabinet minister	22 June 1977	16 February 1980	Janata Party
Lalit Kishore Chaturvedi	Cabinet minister	22 June 1977	16 February 1980	Janata Party
Sampat Ram	Cabinet minister	22 June 1977	16 February 1980	Janata Party
Master Adityendra	Cabinet minister	22 June 1977	16 February 1980	Janata Party
Trilok Chandra Jain	Cabinet minister	22 June 1977	16 February 1980	Janata Party
Digvijay Singh	Cabinet minister	22 June 1977	16 February 1980	Janata Party
Purushottam Mantri	Cabinet minister	22 June 1977	16 February 1980	Janata Party
Surya Narain Chaudhary	Cabinet minister	22 June 1977	16 February 1980	Janata Party
Bhanwar Lal Sharma (politician)	Cabinet minister	22 June 1977	16 February 1980	Janata Party
Manak Chand Surana	Cabinet minister	22 June 1977	16 February 1980	Janata Party
Kalyan Singh Kalvi	Cabinet minister	22 June 1977	16 February 1980	Janata Party
Dr Hari Singh	Cabinet minister	22 June 1977	16 February 1980	Janata Party
Jai Narayan Poonia	Cabinet minister	22 June 1977	16 February 1980	Janata Party
Birad Mal Singhvi	Cabinet minister	22 June 1977	16 February 1980	Janata Party
Mangal Ram Koli	Minister of State	22 June 1977	16 February 1980	Janata Party
Vidya Pathak	Minister of State	22 June 1977	16 February 1980	Janata Party
Mehboob Ali	Minister of State	22 June 1977	16 February 1980	Janata Party
Kailash Meghwal	Minister of State	22 June 1977	16 February 1980	Janata Party
Vigyan Modi	Minister of State	22 June 1977	16 February 1980	Janata Party
Nand Lal Meena	Minister of State	22 June 1977	16 February 1980	Janata Party
Lal Chand	Minister of State	22 June 1977	16 February 1980	Janata Party

== See also ==
- Second Shekhawat ministry
