= First Shiv Charan Mathur ministry =

Government of Rajasthan, India

- 15th Ministry of Rajasthan
- Date formed: 14 July 1981
- Date dissolved: 23 February 1985

People and organisations
- Governor: Raghukul Tilak; K. D. Sharma (acting); Om Prakash Mehra; P. K. Banerji (acting); Om Prakash Mehra
- Chief Minister: Shiv Charan Mathur
- Member party: Indian National Congress
- Status in legislature: Majority government
- Opposition party: Bharatiya Janata Party and others
- Opposition leader: Bhairon Singh Shekhawat

History
- Election: 1980 election
- Legislature term: 7th Rajasthan Assembly
- Predecessor: Jagannath Pahadia ministry
- Successor: Hira Lal Devpura ministry

The First Shiv Charan Mathur ministry was the council of ministers headed by Shiv Charan Mathur in Rajasthan. It succeeded the Pahadia ministry on 14 July 1981 and continued until Mathur resigned on 23 February 1985.

== Background and tenure ==
The ministry served during the seventh Rajasthan Legislative Assembly, in which the Indian National Congress held 133 of 200 seats. He was succeeded by a short caretaker ministry headed by Hira Lal Devpura.

A complete, reliably digitised portfolio allocation for this ministry has not yet been located.

== See also ==
- Government of Rajasthan
- Chief Minister of Rajasthan
- Rajasthan Legislative Assembly
