= Saboo =

Saboo may refer to:

- Saboo (Surname and Gotra in Maheshwari Hindu Caste)
- Gopal Saboo (fl. 1967–1971), Indian politician
- Saboo, a character in The Mighty Boosh
- Saboo, Leh, a village in India
- Sabu, a character in Chacha Chaudhary comics

== See also ==
- Saboo (disambiguation)
