= Ram Chandra Sunda =

Indian politician

Member of the Rajasthan Legislative Assembly
- In office 1962–1967
- Preceded by: Bhairon Singh Shekhawat
- Succeeded by: Hanut Singh
- Constituency: Srimadhopur, Rajasthan
- In office 1967–1972
- Succeeded by: Gopal Singh Khandela
- Constituency: Khandela, Rajasthan

Personal details
- Born: 29 August 1926 Kudan Village, Sikar, Rajasthan, India
- Died: 23 June 2018 (aged 91) Sikar, Rajasthan
- Party: Indian National Congress

Ram Chandra Sunda (29 August 1926 - 23 June 2018) was an Indian politician. He was elected to the Rajasthan Legislative Assembly for two terms. He was a member of the Indian National Congress.

== Early life ==
He was born on 29 August 1926 in the village of Kudan, Sikar district, Rajasthan in family of Govind Ram Sunda. Govind Ram Sunda and his father Kalu Ram Sunda were both freedom fighters, who took part in Shekhawati farmers movement.

== Political career ==
He became member of District Congress Committee in 1959. He has been Member of the Rajasthan Assembly twice:

- 1967-72: from Khandela as Independent.
- 1962-67: from Shrimadopur as Indian National Congress member.
