= Deependra Singh =

Deependra Singh may refer to:

- Deependra Singh Hooda, Indian army officer
- Deependra Singh Negi, Indian footballer
- Deependra Singh Shekhawat, Indian politician
