= Srimadhopur Assembly constituency =

Constituency of the Rajasthan legislative assembly in India

Coordinates: 27.47°N 75.60°E

Sri Madhopur
- Constituency No. 39 for the Rajasthan Legislative Assembly

Constituency details
- Country: India
- Region: North India
- State: Rajasthan
- District: Sikar District
- Established: 1951
- Reservation: None

Member of Legislative Assembly
- 16th Rajasthan Legislative Assembly
- Incumbent Jhabar Singh Kharra
- Party: BJP
- Elected year: 2023

Sri Madhopur Assembly constituency is one of constituencies of Rajasthan Legislative Assembly in the Sikar Lok Sabha constituency.

== Extent ==
Sri Madhopur constituency covers all voters from parts of Sri Madhopur tehsil, which include ILRC Mau, ILRC Ajitgarh, Sri Madhopur Municipal Board, Sri Madhopur Rural, Hanspur, Kotri Shimarla and Jorawar Nagar of ILRC Sri Madhopur; and part of Neem Ka Thana tehsil, which includes ILRC Sanwalpura Tanwaran.

== Members of the Legislative Assembly ==
Year	Name	Party
1. 1952	Roop narayan Lata	Swatantra Party
1. 1957	Bhairon Singh Shekhawat	Bharatiya Jana Sangh
2. 1962	Ram Chandra Sunda	Indian National Congress
3. 1967	Hanut Singh	Bharatiya Jana Sangh
4. 1972	Sanwar Mal	Indian National Congress
5. 1977	Harlal Singh Kharra	Janata Party
6. 1980	Deependra Singh Shekhawat	Indian National Congress
7. 1985	Harlal Singh Kharra	Bharatiya Janata Party
8. 1990	Harlal Singh Kharra	Bharatiya Janata Party
9. 1993	Deependra Singh Shekhawat	Indian National Congress
10. 1998	Deependra Singh Shekhawat	Indian National Congress
11. 2003	Harlal Singh Kharra	Independent
12. 2008	Deependra Singh Shekhawat	Indian National Congress
13. 2013	Jhabar Singh Kharra	Bharatiya Janata Party
14. 2018	Deependra Singh Shekhawat	Indian National Congress
15. 2023	Jhabar Singh Kharra	Bharatiya Janata Party

== Election results ==
=== 2023 ===
2018 Rajasthan Legislative Assembly election
Party	Candidate	Votes	%	±%
BJP	Jhabar Singh Kharra	81,080	41.28	−1.33
INC	Deependra Singh	66,621	33.92	−15.05
Independent	Balram	41,588	21.17	
NOTA	None of the above	2,676	1.36	+0.39
Majority		14,459	7.36	+1.0
Turnout		196,432	70.22	−2.37
BJP gain from INC		Swing		

=== 2018 ===
2018 Rajasthan Legislative Assembly election: Srimadhopur
Party	Candidate	Votes	%	±%
INC	Deependra Singh Sekhawat	90,941	48.97	
BJP	Jhabar Singh Kharra	79,131	42.61	
Independent	Narendra Maharoli	6,285	3.38	
Independent	Durga Prasad Kharra	3,092	1.66	
BSP	Ram Kishor	1,736	0.93	
NOTA	None of the above	1,796	0.97	
Majority		11,810	6.36	
Turnout		185,707	72.59	
INC gain from		Swing		

== See also ==
- Member of the Legislative Assembly (India)
