= Govind Singh Dotasra =

Indian politician (born 1964)

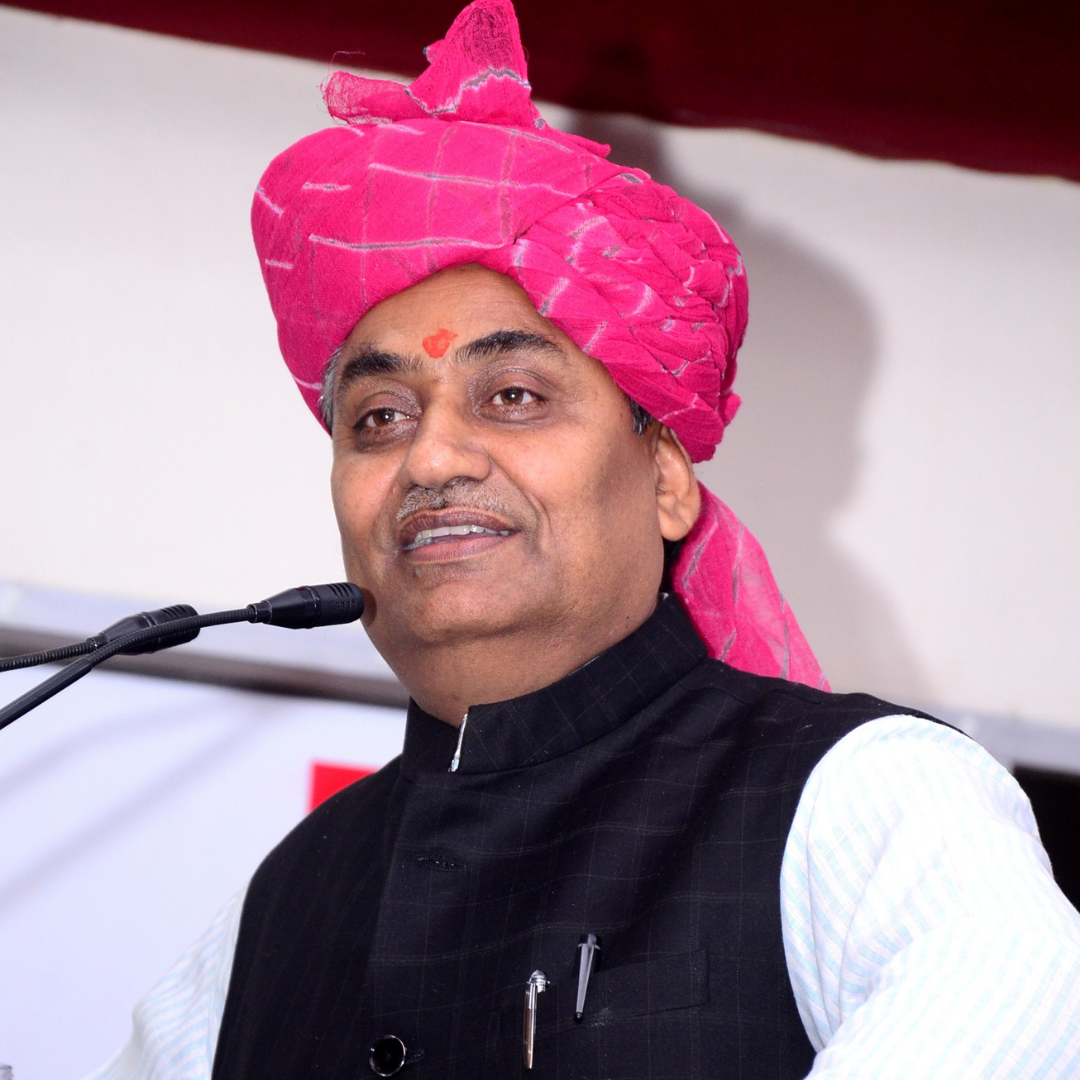

President Rajasthan Pradesh Congress Committee
- Incumbent
- Assumed office 15 July 2020
- Preceded by: Sachin Pilot

Minister of State for Primary & Secondary Education Government of Rajasthan
- In office 28 December 2018 – 20 November 2021
- Preceded by: Vasudev Devnani
- Succeeded by: Bulaki Das Kalla

Member of the Rajasthan Legislative Assembly
- Incumbent
- Assumed office 8 December 2008
- Preceded by: Parasram Mordiya
- Constituency: Lachhmangarh

Pradhan Laxmangarh
- In office 2005–2008

Personal details
- Born: 1 October 1964 (age 61) Laxmangarh, Rajasthan, India
- Party: Indian National Congress
- Children: 2
- Profession: MLA, Politician, Lawyer

Govind Singh Dotasra (born 1 October 1964) is an Indian politician. He is the president of Rajasthan Pradesh Congress Committee. He was appointed Minister of State for primary and secondary education (Independent Charge), Tourism and Devasthan in 2018 Government of Rajasthan. Later on 20 November 2021 he resigned from his ministry post respecting Party's one man one post policy. He is a member of 15th Rajasthan Legislative Assembly and a former chief whip of the Indian National Congress party in that Assembly. He is representing the Lachhmangarh constituency of Sikar district of Rajasthan since 2008 and has been a member of the INC since 1981.

Dotasra was appointed chairman of the media and communication committee ahead of the 2018 Rajasthan polls on 5 October 2018. He served as vice president of Rajasthan Pradesh Congress Committee from 2014 to 2020 and president of District Congress Committee, Sikar, for 7 years (July 2011 to May 2018).

== Early life and education ==
Dotasra was born to Mohan Singh Dotasra and Rupi Devi on 1 October 1964 in the village of Kripa Ram Ji ki Dhani, Sutod, Laxmangarh in Sikar District of Rajasthan. His father was a government teacher. His schooling took place in the native village, and after that, he did B.Com., B.Ed., and LL.B. degrees at the University of Rajasthan. On 4 March 1984, he married Sunita Devi, a teacher. They have two sons. After graduation, he started practicing law in the Sikar Court.

== Political career ==
Dotasra was elected as Pradhan of the Laxmangarh Panchayat Samiti in 2005.

In 2008, he contested the Rajasthan Legislative Assembly election for the first time and won the seat of Laxmangarh by a close margin of 34 votes against independent candidate Dinesh Joshi.

He defeated former union minister of state and 3-time MP Subhash Maharia by a margin of 10,723 votes in the 2013 Rajasthan Legislative Assembly election. In this election, his party Congress, had lost 160+ seats in the state. He is also a member of the Public Accounts Committee of Rajasthan Assembly 2015–16.

In the Assembly, Dotasra has in particular raised issues related to farmers and weaker sections of society.

He won the 2018 Rajasthan Legislative Assembly election - his third win of the Laxmangarh seat - with a margin of 22052 votes, which was the highest in Sikar district.

He won the 2023 Rajasthan Legislative Assembly Election - his fourth win from the Laxmangarh Seat - by a margin of 18,970 votes; he defeated BJP candidate Subhash Maharia.

== Controversies ==
=== Alleged Nepotism in RAS-2018 Recruitment ===
In July 2021, Govind Singh Dotasra faced allegations of nepotism after several of his relatives reportedly scored among the highest marks in the interview stage of the Rajasthan Administrative Services (RAS) 2018 examination. These included his daughter-in-law, Pratibha Poonia, and her siblings, Gaurav Poonia and Prabha Poonia, all of whom reportedly received 80 out of 100 marks in the interview round, despite scoring less than 50 in the written exam. Opposition leaders, including Gulab Chand Kataria, demanded an investigation and accused Dotasra of using his political influence to manipulate results.

Dotasra denied the allegations, stating that the selection process was merit-based and transparent. He claimed that several other candidates also received similar interview scores and that none of his immediate family members were directly selected.

=== REET 2021 Paper Leak Investigation ===
In late 2021, a paper leak scandal surrounding the Rajasthan Eligibility Examination for Teachers (REET) 2021 led to political uproar. While Dotasra was no longer the Education Minister at the time of the investigation, the Bharatiya Janata Party (BJP) demanded a probe into his possible involvement, citing administrative responsibility.

In October 2023, the Enforcement Directorate (ED) conducted raids at properties linked to Dotasra and his relatives in connection with a broader money laundering investigation related to paper leaks. Dotasra called the raids politically motivated and reiterated that he had no role in the incident.

== Rajasthan Legislative Assembly results ==
Govind Singh Dotasra – Rajasthan Legislative Assembly Election Results
SI No.	Year	Assembly	Constituency	Margin	Party	Post
1	2008	13th	Lachhmangarh	34	INC	
2	2013	14th	Lachhmangarh	10,723	INC	Chief Whip, Congress Legislative Party (CLP)
3	2018	15th	Lachhmangarh	22,052	INC	Minister of State
4	2023	16th	Lachhmangarh	18,970	INC	

== Other Activity ==
Dotasra represented Rajasthan Legislative Assembly in 24th Commonwealth Parliamentary Association (CPA) Seminar from 27 May – 1 June 2013 in Singapore. Dotasra participated in 16th and 17th All India Whips' Conference in Goa and Visakhapatnam.
