= Third Hari Dev Joshi ministry =

Government of Rajasthan, India

- 19th Ministry of Rajasthan
- Date formed: 4 December 1989
- Date dissolved: 4 March 1990

People and organisations
- Governor: Sukhdev Prasad; Milap Chand Jain (acting); D. P. Chattopadhyaya
- Chief Minister: Hari Dev Joshi
- Member party: Indian National Congress
- Status in legislature: Majority government
- Opposition party: Bharatiya Janata Party and others

History
- Legislature term: 8th Rajasthan Assembly
- Predecessor: Second Shiv Charan Mathur ministry
- Successor: Second Shekhawat ministry

The Third Hari Dev Joshi ministry was the council of ministers headed by Hari Dev Joshi in Rajasthan from 4 December 1989 to 4 March 1990.

== Background and tenure ==
The ministry governed during the final months of the eighth Rajasthan Legislative Assembly. The Indian National Congress had entered the Assembly with 113 of 200 seats. After the 1990 election, Joshi was succeeded by Bhairon Singh Shekhawat.

A complete, reliably digitised portfolio allocation for this ministry has not yet been located.

== See also ==
- Government of Rajasthan
- Chief Minister of Rajasthan
- Rajasthan Legislative Assembly
