= Ajeetgarh =

Ajeetgarh Ajitgarh
- Town
- position in Rajasthan, India Ajeetgarh (India)
- Coordinates: 27°25′10″N 75°49′23″E
- Country: India
- State: Rajasthan
- District: Sikar
- Tehshil: Shrimadhopur
- Time zone: UTC+5:30 (Indian Standard Time)

Ajeetgarh is a Municipality & Sub-Division of Sikar Division. Ajeetgarh (alternatively spelled Ajitgarh) is a town located in Shrimadhopur tehsil in the Sikar district of Rajasthan, India.

== Demographics ==
According to the 2011 Census of India, the population of Ajeetgarh city is 15,414: 8,082 male and 7,332 female.

== Literacy ==
In the city of Ajeetgarh, the overall literacy rate is 67.96%. Among this, 77.43% of males are literate, while 57.52% of females are literate.
