= Mandha, Rajasthan =

Village in Rajasthan, India

Mandha Madni rahul
- Village
- Location within Rajasthan Location within India
- Coordinates: 27°26′11.5692″N 75°25′6.708″E

Government
  - Type: Federal republic
  - Body: Gram panchayat
  - Rajasthan Legislative Assembly: Virendra Singh (Danta Ramgarh) (Indian National Congress)

Area
  - Total: 1,325.01 ha (3,274.2 acres)
- Elevation: 503 m (1,650 ft)

Population
  - Total: 2,827

Languages
  - Official: Hindi, Rajasthani, English
- Time zone: UTC+5:30 (IST)
- PIN: 332402
- Vehicle registration: RJ-23

Mandha, also known as Mandha Madni, is a village in Danta Ramgarh tehsil in Sikar district in the Indian state of Rajasthan. Its population is 2,827. It is 20.6 km from Reengus and 6.7 km from Khatoo.

== Demographics ==
As per the census of 2011, Mandha village has a population of 2,827, of which 1,462 are males and 1,365 are females.

The sex ratio in Mandha village is 927 on average, which is slightly lower than the state average of Rajasthan, which is 928. Additionally, according to the census, the child sex ratio in Mandha is 868, which is also lower than the state average of 888.

== Literacy ==
According to the 2011 census, Mandha village had a literacy rate of 73.36%, which is higher than the literacy rate of Rajasthan at 66.11%. The male literacy rate in Mandha was 88.59% and the female literacy rate was 57.49%.

== Notable Persons ==
1. Rahul Kumawat - Analyst at ENVIRO LAB, From Mandha, Sikar
2. Jitendra kumawat - Doctor assistant at GHARSANA
3. Dinesh Saini - Student at PDDU Shekhawati University
