= Dadiya Rampura, Rajasthan =

Village in Sikar district in Rajasthan, India

Dadiya Rampura
- Village
- Location within Rajasthan Location within India
- Coordinates: 27°18′20″N 75°28′28″E
- Country: India
- State: Rajasthan
- District: Sikar
- Tehsil: Reengus

Government
  - Type: Federal republic
  - Body: Gram panchayat
  - Rajasthan Legislative Assembly: Mahadeo Singh Khandela (Ind.)

Area
  - Total: 2,016.85 ha (4,983.7 acres)
- Elevation: 503 m (1,650 ft)

Population
  - Total: 7,329

Languages
  - Official: Hindi, Rajasthani, English
- Time zone: UTC+5:30 (IST)
- PIN: 332404
- Telephone code: 91 - 01575
- Vehicle registration: RJ-23

Dadiya Rampura is a village in Reengus tehsil in Sikar district in the Indian state of Rajasthan. Just 13.3 km from Reengus and 63 km from district Sikar.

== Demographics ==
As per the Population Census of 2011, the village of Dadiyarampura has a total population of 7329 individuals, with 3881 being male and 3448 being female.

== Literacy ==
Dadiyarampura village had a literacy rate of 76.49% in 2011, which is higher than the literacy rate of Rajasthan at 66.11%. The male literacy rate in Dadiyarampura was 87.56%, while the female literacy rate was 64.36%.
