= Khandela Assembly constituency =

Constituency of the Rajasthan legislative assembly in India

Coordinates: 27.60°N 75.50°E

Khandela
- Constituency No. 37 for the Rajasthan Legislative Assembly

Constituency details
- Country: India
- Region: North India
- State: Rajasthan
- District: Sikar district
- Established: 1951
- Reservation: None

Member of Legislative Assembly
- 16th Rajasthan Legislative Assembly
- Incumbent Subhash Meel
- Party: Bhartiya Janta Party
- Elected year: 2023

Khandela Assembly constituency is one of constituencies of Rajasthan Legislative Assembly in the Sikar Lok Sabha constituency. Subhash Meel is serving as MLA of Khandela.

== Members of the Legislative Assembly ==
Year	Member	Party
1967	Ram Chandra Sunda	Independent
1972	Gopal Singh Khandela	Independent
1977	Gopal Singh Khandela	Janata Party
1980	Mahadeo Singh Khandela	Indian National Congress
1985	Mahadeo Singh Khandela	Indian National Congress
1990	Gopal Singh Khandela	Janata Dal
1993	Mahadeo Singh Khandela	Independent
1998	Mahadeo Singh Khandela	Indian National Congress
2003	Mahadeo Singh Khandela	Indian National Congress
2008	Banshidhar Bajiya	Bharatiya Janata Party
2013	Banshidhar Bajiya	Bharatiya Janata Party
2018	Mahadeo Singh Khandela	Independent
2023	Subhash Meel Khandela	Bharatiya Janata Party

== Election results ==
=== 2023 ===
2023 Rajasthan Legislative Assembly election
Party	Candidate	Votes	%	±%
BJP	Subhash Meel	114,236	56.0	+27.31
INC	Mahadev Singh	71,597	35.1	+9.16
Independent	Banshidhar Khandela	11,808	5.79	
NOTA	None of the above	1,445	0.71	−0.63
Majority		42,639	20.9	+18.38
Turnout		204,003	76.26	+4.49
BJP gain from INC		Swing		

=== 2018 ===
2018 Rajasthan Legislative Assembly election: Khandela
Party	Candidate	Votes	%	±%
Independent	Mahadeo Singh	53,864	31.21	
BJP	Banshidhar Bajiya	49,516	28.69	
INC	Mahadeo Singh	44,772	25.94	
CPI(M)	Subhash Nehara	16,378	9.49	
NOTA	None of the above	2,306	1.34	
Majority		4,348	2.52	
Turnout		172,575	71.77	
Independent gain from		Swing		

== See also ==
- Member of the Legislative Assembly (India)
