= Hira Lal Devpura ministry =

Government of Rajasthan, India

- 16th Ministry of Rajasthan
- Date formed: 23 February 1985
- Date dissolved: 10 March 1985

People and organisations
- Governor: Om Prakash Mehra
- Chief Minister: Hira Lal Devpura
- Member party: Indian National Congress
- Status in legislature: Caretaker government
- Opposition party: Bharatiya Janata Party and others
- Opposition leader: Bhairon Singh Shekhawat

History
- Election: 1985 election
- Legislature term: Transition from the 7th to the 8th Rajasthan Assembly
- Predecessor: First Shiv Charan Mathur ministry
- Successor: Second Hari Dev Joshi ministry

The Hira Lal Devpura ministry was a short caretaker council of ministers headed by Hira Lal Devpura in Rajasthan from 23 February to 10 March 1985.

== Background and tenure ==
Devpura was appointed after Shiv Charan Mathur resigned during the 1985 Assembly election campaign. The Rajasthan Legislative Assembly Digital Museum describes the appointment as arising from a “constitutional vacuum” and notes that Devpura’s tenure was brief. He was succeeded by Hari Dev Joshi after the election.

A complete, reliably digitised portfolio allocation for this caretaker ministry has not yet been located.

== See also ==
- Government of Rajasthan
- Chief Minister of Rajasthan
- Rajasthan Legislative Assembly
