= Jhabar Singh Kharra =

Indian politician (born 1956)

Minister of State, Government of Rajasthan
- Incumbent
- Assumed office 30 December 2023
- Governor: Kalraj Mishra
- Chief Minister: Bhajan Lal Sharma
- Ministry and Departments: List: * Urban Development (I/C); Self-Governance (I/C)
- Preceded by: Shanti Kumar Dhariwal

Member of the Rajasthan Legislative Assembly
- Incumbent
- Assumed office 3 December 2023
- Preceded by: Deependra Singh Shekhawat
- Constituency: Srimadhopur
- In office 2013–2018
- Preceded by: Deependra Singh Shekhawat
- Succeeded by: Deependra Singh Shekhawat
- Constituency: Srimadhopur

Pradhan, Panchayat Samiti, Sri Madhopur
- In office 2005–2010

Personal details
- Born: 1 October 1956 (age 69) Bharani Sikar, Rajasthan, India
- Party: Bhartiya Janta Party
- Parent: Harlal Singh Kharra
- Education: B.Com.
- Occupation: Politician

Jhabar Singh Kharra (born 1 October 1956) is an Indian politician currently serving as a Minister of State of Urban Development & Self-Governance Department In Government of Rajasthan. He is 14th, & 16th, Member of the Rajasthan Legislative Assembly from Srimadhopur. He is a member of the Bhartiya Janta Party.

== Career ==
From 2013 to 2018, he was elected as MLA from Srimadhopur assembly constituency.

Following the 2023 Rajasthan Legislative Assembly election, he was re-elected as MLA from the Srimadhopur assembly constituency, defeating Deependra Singh, the candidate from the Indian National Congress (INC), by a margin of 14,459 votes.
