= Shrikrishan Modi =

Indian politician (born 1924)

Member of Parliament, Lok Sabha
- In office 1971–1977
- Preceded by: Gopal Saboo
- Succeeded by: Jagdish Prasad Mathur
- Constituency: Sikar

Personal details
- Born: 1924
- Party: Indian National Congress
- Spouse: Kamla Devi

Shrikrishan Modi (born 1924) was an Indian politician. He was elected to the Lok Sabha, the lower house of the Parliament of India, from Sikar in Rajasthan, as a member of the Indian National Congress.
