= Raj Kumari Sharma =

Indian politician

Raj Kumari Sharma is a Bharatiya Janata Party politician from Rajasthan. She has served as a Member of the Rajasthan Legislative Assembly from the Sikar Assembly constituency.
