= Gordhan Verma =

Indian politician

Member of the Rajasthan Legislative Assembly
- In office 2023
- Preceded by: Parasram Mordiya
- In office 2013 - 2018
- Preceded by: Pema Ram
- Succeeded by: Parasram Mordiya
- Constituency: Dhod

Personal details
- Political party: Bharatiya Janata Party
- Spouse: Kanwari Devi
- Children: 2

Gordhan Verma is an Indian politician and Member of the Rajasthan Legislative Assembly from Dhod Sikar district in Rajasthan. He is a Bharatiya Janata Party politician.
