= Shikha Meel Barala =

Indian politician

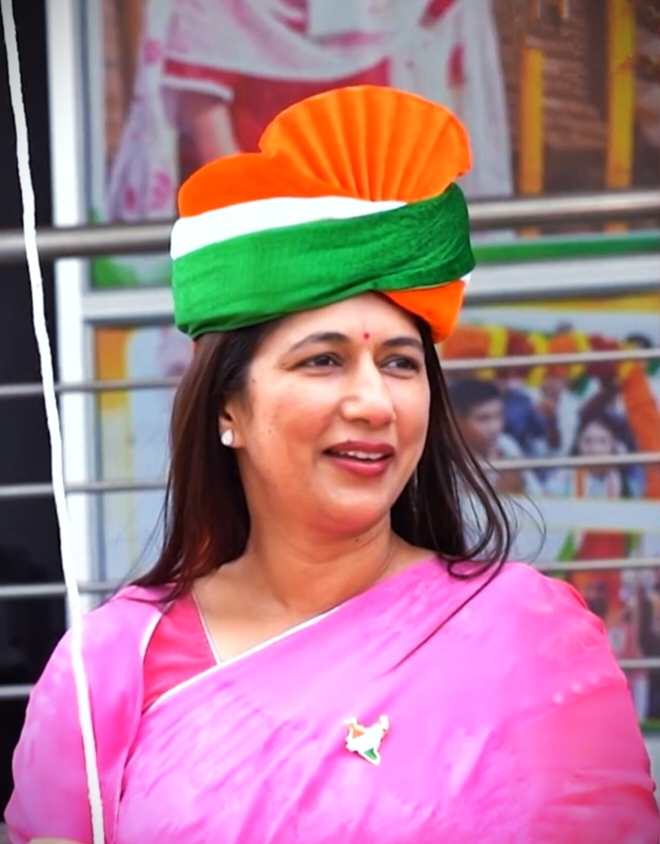

Member of the Rajasthan Legislative Assembly
- Incumbent
- Assumed office 15 December 2023
- Preceded by: Ram Lal Sharma
- Constituency: Chomu

Personal details
- Born: 11 September 1983 (age 42)
- Party: Indian National Congress
- Education: Bachelor of Medicine, Bachelor of Surgery
- Alma mater: Sawai Man Singh Medical College

Shikha Meel Barala (born 11 September 1983) is an Indian politician from the Indian National Congress. She has been serving as a Member of the Rajasthan Legislative Assembly, representing the Chomu Assembly constituency since 2023.

== Medical career ==
After completing her MBBS from Sawai Man Singh Medical College, Jaipur in 2007, Meel pursued a postgraduate degree in Obstetrics and Gynaecology from B.J. Medical College, Ahmedabad. She further specialized in infertility treatment, test-tube baby technology, and laparoscopic surgery at the Institute of Kidney Diseases and Research Centre (IKDRC), Ahmedabad.

In 2014, she joined Barala Hospital and Research Centre in Chomu as a consultant gynaecologist. Over the years, she has provided medical services with a focus on women's health and maternity care.

== Political career ==
Shikha Meel Barala began her political journey with the Indian National Congress. In the 2023 Rajasthan Legislative Assembly election, she contested from the Chomu Assembly constituency and defeated the incumbent Ram Lal Sharma to become the first woman MLA from the constituency. She assumed office on 15 December 2023.

== Election results ==
2023 Chomu Assembly Election Results
Year	Constituency	Candidate	Party	Votes	Percentage	Result
2023	Chomu	Shikha Meel Barala	INC	85,746	40.15%	Elected
2023	Chomu	Ram Lal Sharma	BJP	80,051	37.48%	Runner-up
2023	Chomu	Chhuttan Lal Yadav	RLTP	42,369	19.84%	Lost
