= Dhod Assembly constituency =

Constituency of the Rajasthan legislative assembly in India

Coordinates: 27.49°N 74.99°E

Dhod
- Constituency No. 34 for the Rajasthan Legislative Assembly

Constituency details
- Country: India
- Region: North India
- State: Rajasthan
- District: Sikar district
- Established: 1977
- Reservation: SC

Member of Legislative Assembly
- 16th Rajasthan Legislative Assembly
- Incumbent Gordhan Verma
- Party: Bhartiya Janata Party
- Elected year: 2023

Dhod Assembly constituency is one of the constituencies of Rajasthan Legislative Assembly in the Sikar Lok Sabha constituency.

Dhod constituency covers all voters from parts of Sikar tehsil, which include ILRC Dhod, ILRC Sihot Bari, ILRC Sihot Chhoti, ILRC Doojod, and Gothra Bhookran, Kudan and Raseedpura of ILRC Dadiya; and part of Danta Ramgarh tehsil, which includes Losal Municipal Board, Bhagatpura, Bheema, Jana, Sangalia and Khood of ILRC Losal.

== Members of the Legislative Assembly ==
Election	Name	Party
1977	Ramdev Singh Maharia	Indian National Congress
1980	Ramdev Singh Maharia	Indian National Congress
1985	Ramdev Singh Maharia	Indian National Congress
1990	Ramdev Singh Maharia	Indian National Congress
1993	Amara Ram	Communist Party of India (Marxist)
1998	Amara Ram	Communist Party of India (Marxist)
2003	Amara Ram	Communist Party of India (Marxist)
2008	Pema Ram	Communist Party of India (Marxist)
2013	Gordhan Verma	Bharatiya Janata Party
2018	Parasram Mordiya	Indian National Congress
2023	Gordhan Verma	Bharatiya Janata Party

== Election results ==
=== 2023 ===
2023 Rajasthan Legislative Assembly election: Dhod
Party	Candidate	Votes	%	±%
BJP	Gordhan	85,543	42.3	+17.77
CPI(M)	Pema Ram	72,165	35.69	+3.58
INC	Jagdish Prasad Danodia	34,487	17.05	−22.45
RLP	Mahesh Mordia	3,350	1.66	
NOTA	None of the above	1,383	0.68	−0.25
Majority		13,378	6.61	−0.78
Turnout		202,223	72.45	−2.67
BJP gain from INC		Swing	{{{swing}}}	

=== 2018 ===
2018 Rajasthan Legislative Assembly election: Dhod
Party	Candidate	Votes	%	±%
INC	Parasram Mordiya	75,142	39.5	
CPI(M)	Pema Ram	61,089	32.11	
BJP	Gordhan	46,667	24.53	
NOTA	None of the above	1,775	0.93	
Majority		14,053	7.39	
Turnout		190,239	75.12	
INC gain from		Swing		

=== 2013 ===
2013 Rajasthan Legislative Assembly election: Dhod
Party	Candidate	Votes	%	±%
BJP	Gordhan	88,668	54.91	+30.69
CPI(M)	Pema Ram	43597	27.00	−9.26
INC	Nopa Ram	22507	13.94	−19.94
Majority				
Turnout				
INC gain from		Swing		

=== 2008 ===
2008 Rajasthan Legislative Assembly election: Dhod
Party	Candidate	Votes	%	±%
CPI(M)	Pema Ram	47,840	36.26	
INC	Parasram Mordiya	44695	33.88	
BJP	Gordhan	31948	24.22	
Majority				
Turnout				
INC gain from		Swing		

== See also ==
- Member of the Legislative Assembly (India)
