= Neem Ka Thana Assembly constituency =

Constituency of the Rajasthan legislative assembly in India

Coordinates: 27.74°N 75.78°E

Neem Ka Thana
- Constituency No. 38 for the Rajasthan Legislative Assembly

Constituency details
- Country: India
- Region: North India
- State: Rajasthan
- District: Sikar
- Established: 1957
- Reservation: None

Member of Legislative Assembly
- 16th Rajasthan Legislative Assembly
- Incumbent Suresh Modi
- Party: INC

Neem Ka Thana Assembly constituency is one of constituencies of Rajasthan Legislative Assembly in the Sikar Lok Sabha constituency.

Neem Ka Thana constituency covers all voters from parts of Neem Ka Thana tehsil, which includes ILRC Neem Ka Thana including Neem Ka Thana Municipal Board, ILRC Patan, ILRC Chala, ILRC Dabla.

== Member of the Legislative Assembly ==
Election	Member	Party
1. 1957	Narayan Lal	Indian National Congress
2. 1962	Chhotu	Indian National Congress
3. 1967	Mohan Lal Modi	Indian National Congress
4. 1972	Mala Ram	Bharatiya Jana Sangh
5. 1977	Surya Narain	Janata Party
6. 1980	Mohan Lal Modi	Independent
7. 1985	Phool Chand	Bharatiya Janata Party
8. 1990	Phool Chand	Bharatiya Janata Party
9. 1993	Mohan Lal Modi	Indian National Congress
10. 1998	Mohan Lal Modi	Indian National Congress
11. 2003	Prem Singh Bajor	Bharatiya Janata Party
12. 2008	Ramesh Chand Khandelwal	Indian National Congress
13. 2013	Prem Singh Bajor	Bharatiya Janata Party
14. 2018	Suresh Modi	Indian National Congress
15. 2023	Suresh Modi	Indian National Congress

== Election results ==
=== 2023 ===
2023 Rajasthan Legislative Assembly election
Party	Candidate	Votes	%	±%
INC	Suresh Modi	105,878	53.56	+16.44
BJP	Premsingh Bajore	72,788	36.82	+6.76
RLP	Rajesh Kumar	5,500	2.78	−11.57
JJP	Raghuveer Singh Tanwar	5,202	2.63	
AAP	Mahendra Mandia	3,123	1.58	
NOTA	None of the above	1,283	0.65	+0.17
Majority		33,090	16.74	+9.68
Turnout		197,675	72.15	−0.02
INC hold		Swing		

=== 2018 ===
2018 Rajasthan Legislative Assembly election: Neem Ka Thana
Party	Candidate	Votes	%	±%
INC	Suresh Modi	66,287	37.12	
BJP	Prem Singh Bajore	53,672	30.06	
RLP	Ramesh Khandelwal	25,620	14.35	
BSP	Rajesh Bhaida	13,211	7.4	
Independent	Manju Saini	9,140	5.12	
Swaraj India	Jairam Singh Dabla	3,347	1.87	
NOTA	None of the above	861	0.48	
Majority		12,615	7.06	
Turnout		178,579	72.17	
INC gain from		Swing		

== See also ==
- Member of the Legislative Assembly (India)
