= Subhash Meel =

Indian politician

Subhash Meel is an Indian politician serving as member of Rajasthan Legislative Assembly representing Khandela Assembly constituency. He is member of Bhartiya Janta Party. Meel was born in Sonthaliya, Reengus, Sikar, Rajasthan. He did Bachelor of laws from University of Rajasthan.

In the 2018 Rajasthan Assembly elections, he was a member of Indian National Congress party. He lost the Khandela Assembly elections and Mahadeo Singh Khandela became Member of Rajasthan Legislative Assembly.

In 2023, he was a member of Bhartiya Janta Party and he won assembly elections by defeating Mahadeo Singh Khandela by a margin of 42,639 votes.
