= Jagannath Pahadia ministry =

Government of Rajasthan, India

- 14th Ministry of Rajasthan
- Date formed: 6 June 1980
- Date dissolved: 14 July 1981

People and organisations
- Governor: Raghukul Tilak
- Chief Minister: Jagannath Pahadia
- Member party: Indian National Congress
- Status in legislature: Majority government
- Opposition party: Bharatiya Janata Party and others
- Opposition leader: Bhairon Singh Shekhawat

History
- Election: 1980 election
- Legislature term: 7th Rajasthan Assembly
- Predecessor: President’s rule
- Successor: First Shiv Charan Mathur ministry

The Jagannath Pahadia ministry was the council of ministers headed by Jagannath Pahadia in Rajasthan after the 1980 Rajasthan Legislative Assembly election. It served from 6 June 1980 to 14 July 1981.

== Background and tenure ==
The Indian National Congress held 133 of the 200 seats in the seventh Rajasthan Legislative Assembly; Bhairon Singh Shekhawat was leader of the opposition. Pahadia was Rajasthan’s first chief minister from a Scheduled Caste community. The Assembly archive records a no-confidence motion moved in April 1981.

A complete, reliably digitised portfolio allocation for this ministry has not yet been located.

== See also ==
- Government of Rajasthan
- Chief Minister of Rajasthan
- Rajasthan Legislative Assembly
