= Chomu Assembly constituency =

Constituency of the Rajasthan legislative assembly in India

Coordinates: 27.17°N 75.72°E

Chomu
- Constituency No. 43 for the Rajasthan Legislative Assembly

Constituency details
- Country: India
- Region: North India
- State: Rajasthan
- District: Jaipur district
- Established: 1962
- Reservation: None

Member of Legislative Assembly
- 16th Rajasthan Legislative Assembly
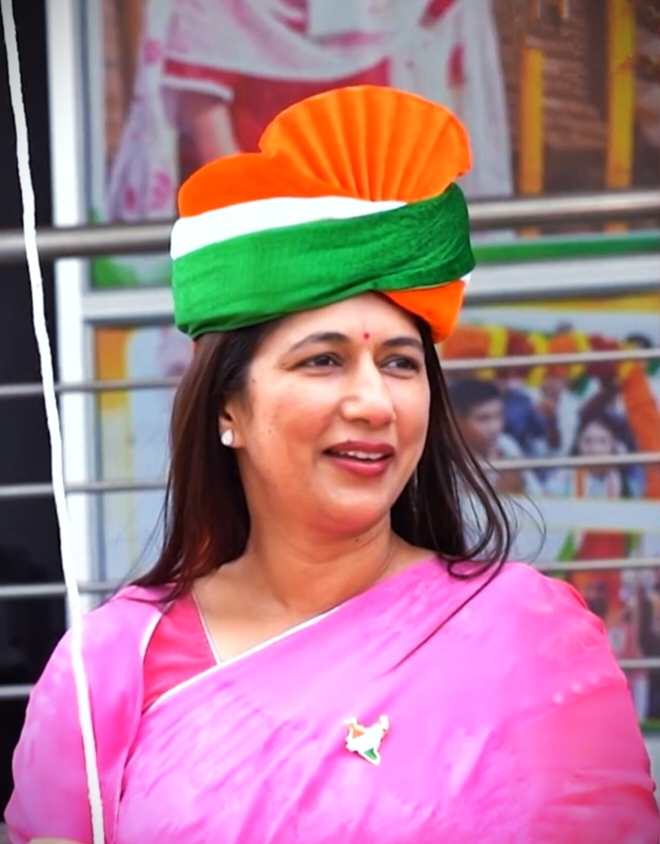
- Incumbent Shikha Meel Barala
- Party: Indian National Congress

Chomu Assembly constituency is one of the constituencies of Rajasthan Legislative Assembly in the Sikar Lok Sabha constituency. Shikha Meel Barala is currently serving as MLA of Chomu.

Chomu constituency covers all voters from parts of Chomu tehsil, which include ILRC Chomu including Chomu Municipal Board, ILRC Govindgarh, ILRC Kaladera; and Singod Kalan, Singod Khurd, Itawa Bhopji and Udaipuriya of ILRC Khejroli.

== Member of the Legislative Assembly ==
Election	Name	Party
1962	Bhanu Prasad	Swatantra Party
1967	Rameshwar Singh	Swatantra Party
1972	Ram Kishore Vyas	Indian National Congress
1977	Rameshwar Singh	Janata Party
1980	Tej Pal	Indian National Congress
1985	Rameshwar Dayal Yadav	Lok Dal
1990	Rameshwar Dayal Yadav	Janata Dal
1993	Ghanshyam Tiwari	Bharatiya Janata Party
1998	Bhagwan Sahai Saini	Indian National Congress
2003	Ram Lal Sharma	Bharatiya Janata Party
2008	Bhagwan Sahai Saini	Indian National Congress
2013	Ram Lal Sharma	Bharatiya Janata Party
2018	Ram Lal Sharma	Bharatiya Janata Party
2023	Shikha Meel Barala	Indian National Congress

== Election results ==
=== 2023 ===
2023 Rajasthan Legislative Assembly election
Party	Candidate	Votes	%	±%
INC	Shikha Meel Barala	85,746	40.15	+3.19
BJP	Ramlal Sharma	80,051	37.48	−0.17
RLP	Chhuttan Lal Yadav	42,369	19.84	−1.11
NOTA	None of the above	987	0.46	−0.54
Majority		5,695	2.67	+1.98
Turnout		213,563	84.42	+0.19
INC gain from BJP		Swing		

=== 2018 ===
2018 Rajasthan Legislative Assembly election: Chomu
Party	Candidate	Votes	%	±%
BJP	Ram Lal Sharma	70,183	37.65	
INC	Bhagwan Sahai Saini	68,895	36.96	
RLP	Chhuttan Lal Yadav	39,042	20.95	
NOTA	None of the above	1,859	1.0	
Majority		1,288	0.69	
Turnout		186,401	84.23	
BJP gain from		Swing		

== See also ==
- Member of the Legislative Assembly (India)
