= Katrathal =

- Village
- Nickname: Katlatar
- Location in Rajasthan, India Katrathal (India)
- Coordinates: 27.9°N 75.2°E
- Country: India
- State: Rajasthan
- District: Sikar

Area shekhawati university
  - Total: 5 km^{2} (1.9 sq mi)

Language
  - Official: Hindi and Rajasthani
- Time zone: UTC+5:30 (IST)
- PIN: 332024
- ISO 3166 code: RJ-IN
- Vehicle registration: RJ-23
- Nearest city: Sikar and Nawalgarh Laxmangarh

Katrathal is a village in Sikar tehsil of Sikar district in Rajasthan, India. It is situated at a distance of 10 kilometres (6.2 mi) from Sikar on State Highway No. 8 (Sikar–Jhunjhunu Road)

Sex ratio - 1189:1000 Literacy- 79% .

== History ==
The history of Katrathal was narrated by Ranmal Singh. According to him This ancient village is believed to be founded about 7000 years back. The ruins of Buddhist temples are found in the village. The village derives its name from combination of Sanskrit words ‘Katra’ (a market surrounded on all sides by walls) + ‘Sthal’ (place). (Katra+Sthal = Katrathal).

The village is believed to be associated with the King Kichak. Kichak was the brother of queen of King Virata, the king of Matsya. Kichak was slain by Bhima during one year of incognito exile spent by Pandavas at the court of king Virata.

In the ancient time the village was inhabited by Buddhist people. In later period there were Jains, Oswals etc but they migrated elsewhere. Muslims destroyed the Buddhist monuments and built fort which later was occupied by Shekhawati. Mjaour cast in village is Dourwal(jaat).

Coins of Allau-din-Khilji and Ibrahim Lodi have been obtained from Harsh and Katrathal respectively. Mughal coins have been obtained from Srimadhopur. Some years back coins of Nagavanshi rulers were obtained from village Sadeensar in Sikar district. On these coins these is image of Naga and palm tree and on other side a man.
