= Banshidhar Bajiya =

Indian politician

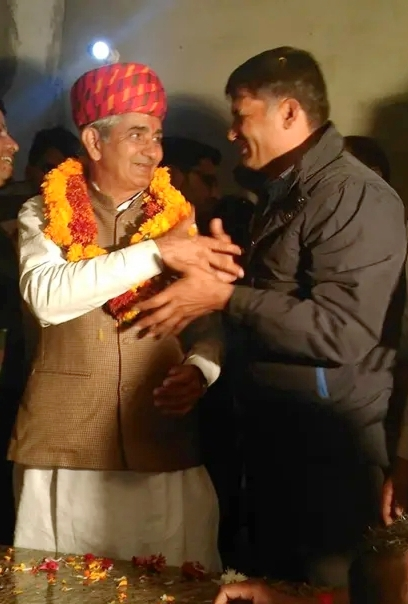

Member of Rajasthan Legislative Assembly
- In office 2013–2018
- Succeeded by: Mahadeo Singh Khandela
- Constituency: Khandela

Personal details
- Born: 10 April 1954 (age 72)
- Party: Bhartiya Janata Party
- Parent: Gopal Singh Khandela
- Education: Bachelor of Commerce
- Alma mater: University of Rajasthan

Banshidhar Bajiya (born 10 April 1954) is an Indian politician who was a member of the Rajasthan Legislative Assembly from Khandela constituency. He is a member of the Bharatiya Janata Party. He is son of former state minister Gopal Singh.
