= Danta Ramgarh Assembly constituency =

Constituency of the Rajasthan legislative assembly in India

Coordinates: 27.26°N 75.18°E

Danta Ramgarh
- Constituency No. 36 for the Rajasthan Legislative Assembly

Constituency details
- Country: India
- Region: North India
- State: Rajasthan
- District: Sikar
- Established: 1951
- Reservation: None

Member of Legislative Assembly
- 16th Rajasthan Legislative Assembly
- Incumbent Virendra Singh
- Party: INC

Danta Ramgarh Assembly constituency is one of constituencies of Rajasthan Legislative Assembly in the Sikar Lok Sabha constituency.

Danta Ramgarh constituency covers all voters from Danta Ramgarh tehsil excluding Losal Municipal Board, Bhagatpura, Bheema, Jana, Sangalia and Khood of ILRC Losal.

== Members of the Legislative Assembly ==
#	Year	Name	Party
1.	1951	Bhairon Singh Shekhawat	Bharatiya Jan Sangh
2.	1957	Madan Singh	Akhil Bharatiya Ram Rajya Parishad
3.	1962	Jagan Singh	Indian National Congress
4.	1967	Madan Singh	Bharatiya Jan Sangh
5.	1972	Narayan Singh Burdak	Indian National Congress
6.	1977	Madan Singh	Independent
7.	1980	Narayan Singh Burdak	Indian National Congress
8.	1985	Narayan Singh Burdak	Indian National Congress
9.	1990	Ajay Singh Chautala	Janata Dal
10.	1993	Narayan Singh Burdak	Indian National Congress
11.	1998	Narayan Singh Burdak	Indian National Congress
12.	2003	Narayan Singh Burdak	Indian National Congress
13.	2008	Amra Ram	Communist Party of India (Marxist)
14.	2013	Narayan Singh Burdak	Indian National Congress
15	2018	Virendra Singh Burdak	Indian National Congress
16.	2023	Virendra Singh Burdak	Indian National Congress

== Election results ==
=== 2023 ===
- Virendra Singh (Congress) : 105,000 votes. won by 7,000 votes near incumbent candidate
- BJP’s Gajanand Kumawat : 98,000 votes.
- Virendra Singh's wife, JJP’s Rita Chaudhary, was a distant fourth, polling 1,597

2023 Rajasthan Legislative Assembly election
Party	Candidate	Votes	%	±%
INC	Virendra Singh Burdak	99,413	45.03	+10.62
BJP	Gajanand Kumawat	91,416	41.41	+7.49
CPI(M)	Amra Ram	20,891	9.46	−14.49
NOTA	None of the above	1,400	0.63	+0.0
Majority		7,997	3.62	+3.13
Turnout		220,759	76.13	+2.31
INC hold		Swing	{{{swing}}}	

=== 2018 ===
2018 Rajasthan Legislative Assembly election: Danta Ramgarh
Party	Candidate	Votes	%	±%
INC	Virendra Singh	64,931	34.41	
BJP	Harish Chand Kumawat	64,011	33.92	
CPI(M)	Amra Ram	45,186	23.95	
BSP	Kalu Ram	3,661	1.94	
Independent	Vijendra	2,782	1.47	
Independent	Hanuman Singh	1,750	0.93	
NOTA	None of the above	1,188	0.63	
Majority		920	0.49	
Turnout		188,701	73.82	
INC gain from		Swing		

=== 2013 ===
2013 Rajasthan Legislative Assembly election: Danta Ramgarh
Party	Candidate	Votes	%	±%
INC	Narayan Singh	60,926	36.84	+5.74
BJP	Harish Chandra	60351	36.49	+11.67
CPI(M)	Amra Ram	30142	18.23	−16.6
NOTA	None of the Above	1999	1.21	
Majority				
Turnout				
INC gain from		Swing		

=== 2008 ===
2008 Rajasthan Legislative Assembly election: Danta Ramgarh
Party	Candidate	Votes	%	±%
CPI(M)	Amra Ram	45,909	34.83	
INC	Narayan Singh	40990	31.1	
Majority				
Turnout				
CPI(M) gain from		Swing		

== See also ==
- Member of the Legislative Assembly (India)
