= Sikar Assembly constituency =

Constituency of the Rajasthan legislative assembly in India

Coordinates: 27.61°N 75.14°E

Sikar
- Constituency No. 35 for the Rajasthan Legislative Assembly

Constituency details
- Country: India
- Region: North India
- State: Rajasthan
- District: Sikar district
- Established: 1951
- Reservation: None

Member of Legislative Assembly
- 16th Rajasthan Legislative Assembly
- Incumbent Rajendra Pareek
- Party: Indian National Congress
- Elected year: 2023

Sikar Assembly constituency is one of constituencies of Rajasthan Legislative Assembly in the Sikar Lok Sabha constituency.

Sikar constituency covers all voters from parts of Sikar tehsil, which include ILRC Sikar including Sikar Municipal Council, ILRC Piprali, and Dadiya, Gothra Beri, Tarpura and Koleera of ILRC Dadiya.

== Members of the Legislative Assembly ==
| No. | Year | Member | Party |
|---|---|---|---|
| 1 | 1952 | Radhakishan Maru | Indian National Congress |
| 2 | 1952 | Ishawar Singh | Krishikar Lok Party |
| 3 | 1957 | Jagdish Prasad | Bharatiya Jan Sangh |
| 4 | 1962 | Swaroop Narain | Indian National Congress |
| 5 | 1967 | Ramdev Singh Maharia | Indian National Congress |
| 6 | 1972 | Gordhan Singh | Swatantra Party |
| 7 | 1977 | Ranmal Singh Dorwal | Indian National Congress |
| 8 | 1980 | Ghanshyam Tiwari | Bharatiya Janata Party |
| 9 | 1985 | Ghanshyam Tiwari | Bharatiya Janata Party |
| 10 | 1990 | Rajendra Pareek | Indian National Congress |
| 11 | 1993 | Rajendra Pareek | Indian National Congress |
| 12 | 1998 | Rajendra Pareek | Indian National Congress |
| 13 | 2003 | Raj Kumari Sharma | Bharatiya Janata Party |
| 14 | 2008 | Rajendra Pareek | Indian National Congress |
| 15 | 2013 | Ratan Lal Jaldhari | Bharatiya Janata Party |
| 16 | 2018 | Rajendra Pareek | Indian National Congress |
| 17 | 2023 | Rajendra Pareek | Indian National Congress |

== Election results ==
=== 2023 ===
2023 Rajasthan Legislative Assembly election
| Party | Candidate | Votes | % | ±% |
|---|---|---|---|---|
| INC | Rajendra Pareek | 97,161 | 45.5 | +1.64 |
| BJP | Ratanlal Jaldhari | 67,123 | 31.43 | −4.45 |
| Independent | Tarachand Dhayal | 40,782 | 19.1 | |
| NOTA | None of the above | 695 | 0.33 | −0.74 |
| Majority | | 30,038 | 14.07 | +6.09 |
| Turnout | | 213,541 | 73.47 | +0.92 |
| INC hold | | Swing | +1.64 | |

=== 2018 ===
2018 Rajasthan Legislative Assembly election: Sikar
| Party | Candidate | Votes | % | ±% |
|---|---|---|---|---|
| INC | Rajendra Pareek | 83,472 | 43.86 | |
| BJP | Ratanlal Jaldhari | 68,292 | 35.88 | |
| RLP | Wahid Chowhan | 28,906 | 15.19 | |
| NOTA | None of the above | 2,031 | 1.07 | |
| Majority | | 15,180 | 7.98 | |
| Turnout | | 190,311 | 72.55 | |
| INC gain from | | Swing | | |

== See also ==
- Member of the Legislative Assembly (India)
