= Ranmal Singh Dorwal =

Indian politician (1923–2024)

Member of the Rajasthan Legislative Assembly
- In office 1977–1980
- Preceded by: Gordhan Singh
- Succeeded by: Ghanshyam Tiwari
- Constituency: Sikar

Personal details
- Born: 19 November 1923; Katrathal, Kingdom of Jaipur, Rajputana Agency, India
- Died: 11 December 2024 (aged 101); Katrathal, Sikar district, Rajasthan, India
- Political party: Indian National Congress
- Spouse: Smt. Kasturi Devi

Ranmal Singh Dorwal (19 November 1923 – 11 December 2024) was an Indian politician and Independence activist. He was elected to the Rajasthan Legislative Assembly from Sikar. Dorwal was a member of Indian National Congress.

== Life and career ==
Dorwal was born on 19 November 1923. He was actively involved in the Shekhawati farmers movement, advocating for the rights of farmers against the exploitation by Jagirdars and Zamindars. His commitment to public service extended to various leadership positions, including serving as Sarpanch, Pradhan, and Chairman of multiple cooperative societies in Sikar.

Dorwal died on 11 December 2024, at the age of 101.
