= Second Hari Dev Joshi ministry =

Government of Rajasthan, India

- 17th Ministry of Rajasthan
- Date formed: 10 March 1985
- Date dissolved: 20 January 1988

People and organisations
- Governor: Om Prakash Mehra; D. P. Gupta (acting); Vasantdada Patil; Jagdish Sharan Verma (acting)
- Chief Minister: Hari Dev Joshi
- Member party: Indian National Congress
- Status in legislature: Majority government
- Opposition party: Bharatiya Janata Party and others

History
- Election: 1985 election
- Legislature term: 8th Rajasthan Assembly
- Predecessor: Hira Lal Devpura ministry
- Successor: Second Shiv Charan Mathur ministry

The Second Hari Dev Joshi ministry was the council of ministers headed by Hari Dev Joshi in Rajasthan after the 1985 Rajasthan Legislative Assembly election. It served from 10 March 1985 to 20 January 1988.

== Background and tenure ==
The Indian National Congress held 113 of the 200 seats in the eighth Rajasthan Legislative Assembly. Joshi was replaced by Shiv Charan Mathur in January 1988.

A complete, reliably digitised portfolio allocation for this ministry has not yet been located.

== See also ==
- Government of Rajasthan
- Chief Minister of Rajasthan
- Rajasthan Legislative Assembly
