= Gopal Saboo =

Indian politician (born 1926)

Member of Parliament, Lok Sabha
- In office 1967–1971
- Preceded by: Rameshwar Tantia
- Succeeded by: Shrikrishan Modi
- Constituency: Sikar

Personal details
- Born: 5 December 1926
- Party: Bharatiya Jana Sangh
- Spouse: Radhadev

Gopal Saboo (born 5 December 1926) was an Indian politician. He was elected to the Lok Sabha, the lower house of the Parliament of India, from Sikar in Rajasthan, as a member of the Bharatiya Jana Sangh.
