= Lachhmangarh Assembly constituency =

Constituency of the Rajasthan legislative assembly in India

Coordinates: 27.82°N 75.03°E

Lachhmangarh
- Constituency No. 33 for the Rajasthan Legislative Assembly

Constituency details
- Country: India
- Region: North India
- State: Rajasthan
- District: Sikar district
- Established: 1951
- Reservation: None

Member of Legislative Assembly
- 16th Rajasthan Legislative Assembly
- Incumbent Govind Singh Dotasra
- Party: INC
- Elected year: 2018

Lachhmangarh Assembly constituency is one of constituencies of Rajasthan Legislative Assembly in the Sikar Lok Sabha constituency.

Lachhmangarh constituency covers all voters from Lachhmangarh tehsil.

== Members of the Legislative Assembly ==
Year	Member	Party
1952	Balbir Singh Jakhar	Krishikar Lok Parishad
1957	Kishan Singh	Indian National Congress
1962	Kishan Singh	Swatantra Party
1967	Nathmal	Swatantra Party
1972	Keshar Deo	Samyukta Socialist Party
1977	Parasram Mordiya	Indian National Congress
1980	Parasram Mordiya	Indian National Congress (I)
1985	Keshar Deo	Lok Dal
1990	Parasram Mordiya	Indian National Congress
1993	Parasram Mordiya	Indian National Congress
1998	Parasram Mordiya	Indian National Congress
2003	Keshar Deo	Bharatiya Janata Party
2008	Govind Singh Dotasra	Indian National Congress
2013	Govind Singh Dotasra	Indian National Congress
2018	Govind Singh Dotasra	Indian National Congress
2023	Govind Singh Dotasra	Indian National Congress

== Election results ==
=== 2023 ===
2023 Rajasthan Legislative Assembly election: Lachhmangarh
Party	Candidate	Votes	%	±%
INC	Govind Singh Dotasra	113,304	52.51	+0.73
BJP	Subhash Maharia	94,334	43.72	+3.57
NOTA	None of the above	1,552	0.72	+0.08
Majority		18,970	8.79	−2.84
Turnout		215,757	77.05	+2.77
INC gain from		Swing		

=== 2018 ===
2018 Rajasthan Legislative Assembly election: Lachhmangarh
Party	Candidate	Votes	%	±%
INC	Govind Singh Dotasra	98,227	51.78	
BJP	Dinesh Joshi	76,175	40.15	
CPI(M)	Brijendra Singh	8,617	4.54	
NOTA	None of the above	1,206	0.64	
Majority		22,052	11.63	
Turnout		189,716	74.28	
INC gain from		Swing		

== See also ==
- Member of the Legislative Assembly (India)
