= Rameshwar Tantia =

Indian politician

Member of Parliament, Lok Sabha
- In office 1957–1967
- Preceded by: Nand Lal Sharma
- Succeeded by: Gopal Saboo
- Constituency: Sikar, Rajasthan.

Personal details
- Born: 26 January 1910
- Died: 22 July 1977 (aged 67)
- Party: Indian National Congress
- Spouse: Durga Devi

Rameshwar Tantia (1910-1977) was an Indian politician. He was elected to the Lok Sabha, the lower house of the Parliament of India from Sikar, Rajasthan as a member of the Indian National Congress.
