= Second Shiv Charan Mathur ministry =

Government of Rajasthan, India

- 18th Ministry of Rajasthan
- Date formed: 20 January 1988
- Date dissolved: 4 December 1989

People and organisations
- Governor: Jagdish Sharan Verma (acting); Sukhdev Prasad; Jagdish Sharan Verma (acting); Sukhdev Prasad
- Chief Minister: Shiv Charan Mathur
- Member party: Indian National Congress
- Status in legislature: Majority government
- Opposition party: Bharatiya Janata Party and others

History
- Legislature term: 8th Rajasthan Assembly
- Predecessor: Second Hari Dev Joshi ministry
- Successor: Third Hari Dev Joshi ministry

The Second Shiv Charan Mathur ministry was the council of ministers headed by Shiv Charan Mathur in Rajasthan from 20 January 1988 to 4 December 1989.

== Background and tenure ==
It governed during the eighth Rajasthan Legislative Assembly, where the Indian National Congress held 113 of 200 seats. Mathur was succeeded by Hari Dev Joshi in December 1989.

A complete, reliably digitised portfolio allocation for this ministry has not yet been located.

== See also ==
- Government of Rajasthan
- Chief Minister of Rajasthan
- Rajasthan Legislative Assembly
