= Second Shekhawat ministry =

Indian state government (1990–1992)

- Ministry of Rajasthan
- Date formed: 4 March 1990
- Date dissolved: 15 December 1992

People and organisations
- Chief Minister: Bhairon Singh Shekhawat
- Member parties: Bharatiya Janata Party; Janata Dal
- Status in legislature: Coalition government

Bhairon Singh Shekhawat became Chief Minister of Rajasthan, India for the second time in 1990 as leader of a Bharatiya Janata Party and Janata Dal alliance. In the 1990 election to the Rajasthan Legislative Assembly, out of total 200 seats, the Bharatiya Janata Party won 85 and Janata Dal won 50 seats. Shekhawat was sworn in as chief minister on 4 March 1990. Here are the names of the ministers:

== Council of ministers ==
Name	Office	Portfolio	Took office	Left office	Party
Bhairon Singh Shekhawat	Chief Minister	Chief Minister	4 March 1990	15 December 1992	Bharatiya Janata Party
Lalit Kishore Chaturvedi	Cabinet minister		4 March 1990	15 December 1992	
Bhanwar Lal Sharma	Cabinet minister	Indira Gandhi Neher Pariyojana	4 March 1990	15 December 1992	
Nathu Singh	Cabinet minister		4 March 1990	15 December 1992	
K. K. Goyal	Cabinet minister	Minister of Industry	4 March 1990	15 December 1992	
Digvijay Singh	Cabinet minister		4 March 1990	15 December 1992	
Sumitra Singh	Cabinet minister		4 March 1990	15 December 1992	
Chaturbhuj Verma	Cabinet minister		4 March 1990	15 December 1992	
Pushpa Jain	Cabinet minister		4 March 1990	15 December 1992	
Vijay Singh Jhala	Cabinet minister		4 March 1990	15 December 1992	
Ram Kishore Meena	Cabinet minister		4 March 1990	15 December 1992	
Dr. Chandra Bhan	Cabinet minister		4 March 1990	15 December 1992	
Bhanwar Lal Sharma	Cabinet minister		4 March 1990	15 December 1992	
Rahul	Cabinet minister		4 March 1990	15 December 1992	
Mohan Meghwal	Minister of State		4 March 1990	15 December 1992	
Jivraj Kataria	Minister of State		4 March 1990	15 December 1992	
Kundan Lai Miglani	Minister of State		4 March 1990	15 December 1992	
Chuni Lai Girasia	Minister of State		4 March 1990	15 December 1992	
Harlal Kharra	Minister of State		4 March 1990	15 December 1992	
Ramzan Khan	Minister of State		4 March 1990	15 December 1992	
Fateh Singh	Minister of State		4 March 1990	15 December 1992	
Kalu Lal Gurjar	Minister of State		4 March 1990	15 December 1992	

== See also ==
- First Shekhawat ministry
