= Suresh Modi =

Indian politician

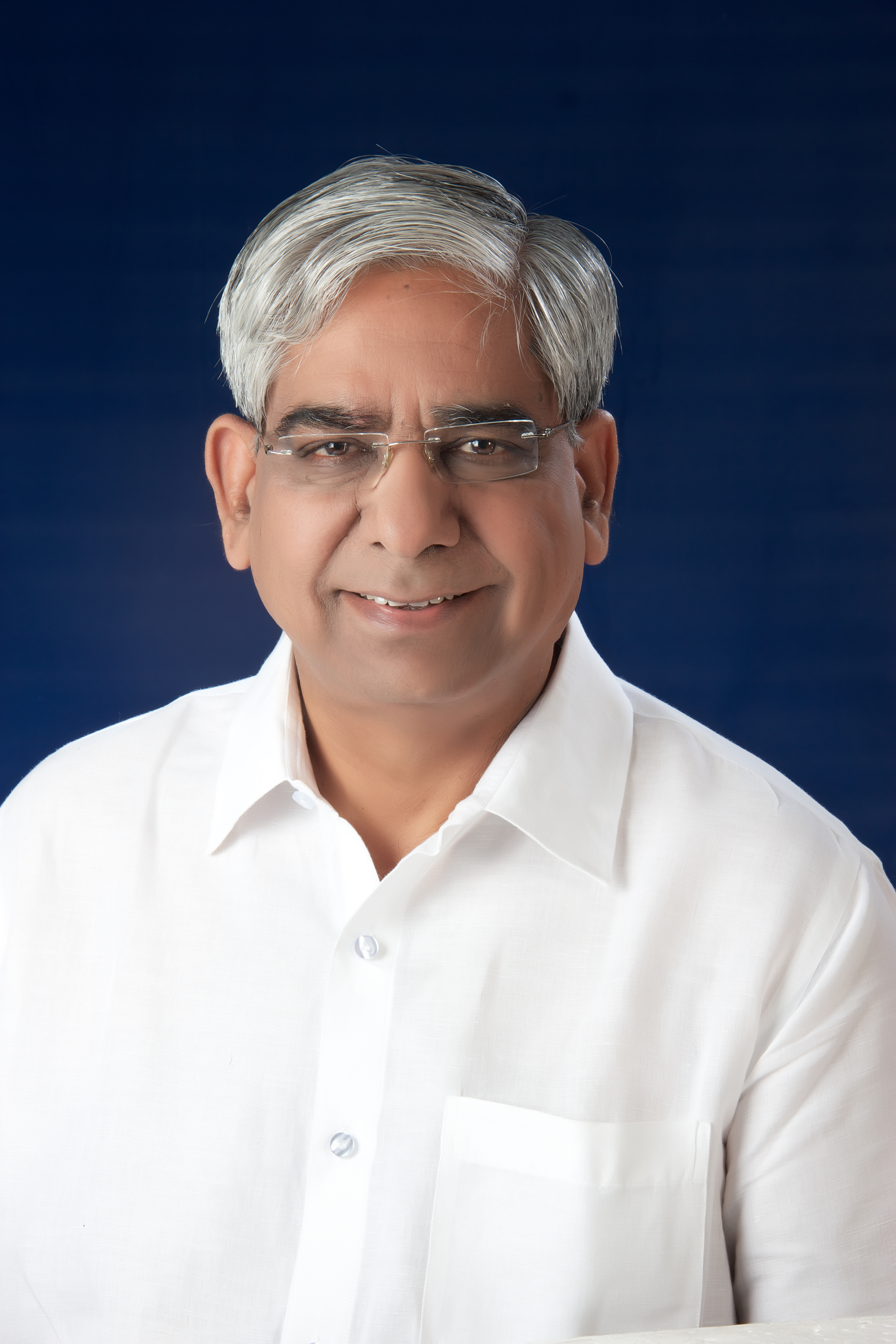

Member of the Rajasthan Legislative Assembly
- Incumbent
- Assumed office 11 December 2018
- Constituency: Neem Ka Thana

Personal details
- Born: 2 March 1950 (age 76) Neem Ka Thana, Sikar Rajasthan
- Party: Indian National Congress
- Education: C.A., B.Com.
- Occupation: politician

Suresh Modi (born 2 March 1950) is an Indian politician who is a member of the Rajasthan Legislative Assembly and elected member from Neem Ka Thana constituency. He is a member of the political party Indian National Congress.

== Political career ==
Suresh Modi started his career in the 2018 Neem Ka Thana constituency, winning by 66,287 (37.12%) votes.
