= Rajendra Pareek =

Indian politician

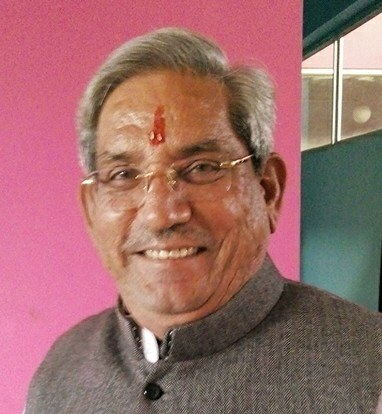
- Rajendra Pareek, MLA of Sikar, Rajasthan

Minister of Industries, Public Undertaking, Economics & Statistics, Excise, NRIs & Mines in Government of Rajasthan
- In office 13 December 2008 – 12 December 2013
- Constituency: Sikar (Rajasthan Assembly constituency), Rajasthan

Personal details
- Born: Sikar, Rajasthan, India
- Party: Indian National Congress
- Spouse: Veena Pareek
- Children: Two
- Profession: Politician

Rajendra Pareek is an Indian politician. He is Member of the Rajasthan Legislative Assembly from Sikar constituency. He served as minister in the Rajasthan Assembly, and has been elected to the Rajasthan Legislative Assembly from Sikar constituency for six terms since 1990.

== Education and early career ==
He graduated with a B.Com degree from the University of Rajasthan in 1972.

== Political career ==
In the elections of 2008, he again won from Sikar. He lost to candidates of the Bharatiya Janata Party in the 2003 and 2013 elections.

Pareek has twice refused to eat cereals for 27 months in support of construction of a railway overbridge connecting the localities of Sikar. His abstentions ended when project was begun.

As of December 2014, he is an Executive Member of Rajasthan Pradesh Congress Committee.
