= Narayan Singh Burdak =

Indian politician (born 1933)

Member of the Rajasthan Legislative Assembly
- In office 1972–1977, 1980–1990, 1993–2008, 2013 – 2018
- Constituency: Danta Ramgarh Assembly constituency

President of Rajasthan Pradesh Congress Committee
- In office 2003–2005
- Preceded by: Ashok Gehlot
- Succeeded by: C.P. Joshi

Forest Minister Government of Rajasthan
- In office 1988–1989

Personal details
- Born: 13 March 1933 (age 93) Dookiya, Sikar, Rajasthan, British India
- Party: Indian National Congress
- Spouse: Mohani Devi
- Children: Virendra Singh

Narayan Singh Burdak (born 13 March 1933) is an Indian politician belonging to the Indian National Congress. He served as Forest Minister in the Government of Rajasthan from 1988 to 1989. He also served as president of the Rajasthan Pradesh Congress Committee. He was elected to the Rajasthan Legislative Assembly for seven terms representing Danta Ramgarh constituency between 1972 and 2018. His political career spans over more than 45 years.

== Political career ==
Burdak has had a long career in Indian politics spanning over four decades, representing the Indian National Congress. His political journey began at the local level, where he served as Sarpanch, Pradhan, and Zilapramukh. He first entered electoral politics in 1954 at the Panchayat level and later served as Zilapramukh for 17 years. During 2000s he was among the prominent leaders of Jat Politics in Rajasthan. He was first elected as an MLA in 1972, representing the Danta Ramgarh constituency. His electoral success continued with subsequent victories in 1980, 1985, 1993, 1998, 2003, and 2013. During his tenure, he held the post of Forest Minister in the Rajasthan government between 1988 and 1989. Additionally, he served as the Pradesh Congress Committee President of Rajasthan.
