= Mehboob Ali (Rajasthani politician) =

Indian politician

- Born: 1931; Bikaner district, Rajasthan
- Died: 2011 (aged 79–80)
- Occupation: Politician
- Political party: Bharatiya Janata Party

Mehboob Ali (1931–2011) was a former leader of Bharatiya Janata Party from Rajasthan. He was a cabinet minister from 1977 to 1980 in the Government of Rajasthan headed by Chief Minister Shekhewat. He hailed from Bikaner district.
