= Deependra Singh Shekhawat =

Member of Legislative Assembly

Member of Rajasthan Legislative Assembly
- In office 1980 - 1985, 1993 - 2003, 2008 - 2013, 2018 – 2023
- Succeeded by: Jhabar Singh Kharra
- Constituency: Sri Madhopur, Rajasthan

Speaker of the Rajasthan Legislative Assembly
- In office 2 January 2009 – 20 January 2014
- Preceded by: Sumitra Singh
- Succeeded by: Kailash Chandra Meghwal

Personal details
- Born: 20 July 1951 (age 75) Jodhpur, Rajasthan
- Party: Indian National Congress
- Education: Bachelor of Science
- Occupation: Politician

Deependra Singh Shekhawat (born 20 June 1951) is an Indian politician who served as speaker of the Rajasthan Legislative Assembly from 2009 to 2014. He has been elected to the Rajasthan Legislative Assembly from Sri Madhopur for five terms between 1980 and 2023. He is a member of the Indian National Congress.
