= Ram Lal Sharma =

Indian politician

Member of the Rajasthan Legislative Assembly
- In office 2013–2023
- Preceded by: Bhagwan Sahai Saini
- Succeeded by: Dr Shikha Meel Barala
- Constituency: Chomu
- In office 2003–2008
- Preceded by: Bhagwan Sahai Saini
- Succeeded by: Bhagwan Sahai Saini
- Constituency: Chomu

Personal details
- Born: 20 June 1973 (age 53) Chomu, Rajasthan, India
- Party: Bhartiya Janata Party
- Education: BA, LLB (Rajasthan University)
- Occupation: agriculture

Ram Lal Sharma (20 June 1973) is an Indian politician. He is member of Bharatiya Janata Party. He is a former three term member of Rajasthan Legislative Assembly.

== Personal life ==
Ram Lal Sharma was born on 20 June 1973 in Chomu. His father's name is Girdhari Lal Sharma. His education qualifications include a B.A degree from the Rajasthan University in the year 1995 and another LLB degree in the year 2000. He is married to Smt. Manju Devi. Manju is a housewife and has two children.

== Political career ==
Ram Lal Sharma contested from Chomu constituency in 2003 as a member of the Bharatiya Janata Party in which he won by 48,043 votes and defeated Bhagwan Sahay Saini.

In 2008, he again contested from Chomu constituency in which he got 45,245 votes but lost to Bhagwan Sahay Saini by 45,380 votes.

He contested from Chomu constituency again in the 2013 election in which he won by 93,516 votes and his runner up Bhagwan Sahay Saini received 49,043 votes.

He contested from Chomu region again in the 2018 election in which he won by 70,183 votes and his runner up Bhagwan Sahay Saini received 68,895 votes.

In 2023 he contested from Chomu region as a member of Bhartiya Janta Party but lost to INC Shikha Meel Barala by a margin of 5695 votes.
