= Nandlal Sharma =

Indian politician

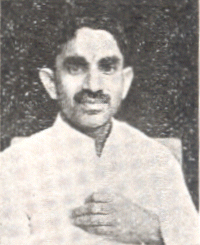
Nandlal Sharma in 1952

Nandlal Sharma (born 2 May 1911) was an Indian politician and shastri. He was born in Alizai, Kohat District, the son of Pandit Harish Chander who settled in Kohat from Khost, Afghanistan. His father was a landlord and a Pandit. Nand Lal Sharma studied at Sanatan Dharma College in Rawalpindi and Benaras Hindu University. He obtained M.A. and LL.B. and Vedant Shastri degrees from BHU. In Benaras, he became the general secretary of the Benaras Hindu Sabha.

Sharma joined the Indian National Congress and was active in the 1930 Non-cooperation movement. After graduation Sharma passed the All India Audits and Accounts Competition, but was not selected due to his involvement in the nationalist movement.

He married Krishna Devi in 1932, the couple had two sons and one daughter. He entered the Bar and began practicing law in Kohat.

He soon gave up legal practice and dedicated himself to religious service, becoming general secretary of the Punjab Pratinidhi Mahasabha. He served as the first secretary of the Sanatan Dharma Degree College in Rawalpindi and as the general secretary of the Sanatan Dharma Pratinidhi Mahasabha.

In 1939, he opposed the Hindu Religious Endowment Bill, that was debated in the North West Frontier Province assembly. Sharma authored 'Criticism of Hindu Code Bill', and opposed divorce rights, arguing that marriage was samskara. Sharma co-founded the All India Anti-Hindu Code Bill Committee. In 1947 he campaigned against the partition of India, cow slaughter and the Hindu Code Bill, being jailed during the latter movement. In 1950 he was again arrested during campaign against cow slaughter.

He also served as the secretary of the Akhil Bharatiya Dharmasangh. He was the Chief Organizer of the Akhil Bharatiya Ram Rajya Parishad. Sharma served as general secretary of the Rishikul Brahmacharyashram in Hardwar. He lived at the Rishikul Brahmacharyashram.

Sharma was elected to the first Lok Sabha (lower house of the parliament of India) from the Sikar constituency of Rajasthan in the 1952 Indian general election. He obtained 52,980 votes (39.49%).

In the midst of the Jammu Parishad agitations, Sharma was arrested in Delhi on 6 March 1953, along with Syama Prasad Mookherjee, Guru Dutt (head of the Delhi Jan Sangh) and N.C. Chatterjee and 18 others for defying court order banning processions. They were released on 12 March 1953.

Sharma unsuccessfully contested the Durg constituency of Madhya Pradesh in the 1957 Indian general election. He finished in third place with 37,324 votes (21.73%).

As of 1961 Sharma was reportedly the President of the Akhil Bharatiya Ram Rajya Parishad. Sharma finished in third place with 39,798 votes (18.76%) for the Durg seat in the 1962 Indian general election. At the time he was living in New Delhi.
