= Subhash Maharia =

Indian politician

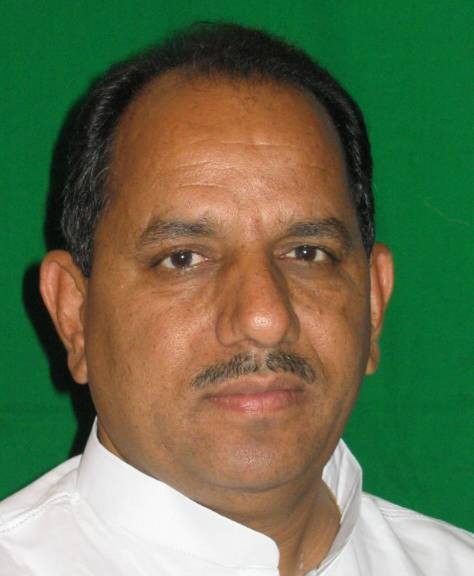
- Mahariya in 1998

Member of Parliament, Lok Sabha
- In office 5 March 1998 – 18 May 2009
- Prime Minister: Atal Bihari Vajpayee (1998–2004); Manmohan Singh (2004–2009)
- Preceded by: Dr. Hari Singh
- Succeeded by: Mahadev Singh Khandela
- Constituency: Sikar, Rajasthan

Union Minister of State, Rural Development
- In office 13 October 1999 – 29 January 2003
- Prime Minister: Atal Bihari Vajpayee

Personal details
- Born: 29 September 1957 (age 69) Sikar, Rajasthan, India
- Party: Bharatiya Janata Party (1998–2013) (2023–present) Indian National Congress (November 2016 – May 2023)
- Spouse: Sushma Maharia
- Education: Shri Kalyan Government College, Sikar
- Profession: Politician

Subhash Maharia (born 29 September 1957) is an Indian politician from Sikar, Rajasthan. He served as union minister of state for Rural Development, Food & Public Distribution in Government of India. He is a member of Bharatiya Janta Party. He was elected to the 12th, 13th and 14th Lok Sabha from Sikar. His Uncle Ramdev Singh Maharia, was a minister in Rajasthan Government.

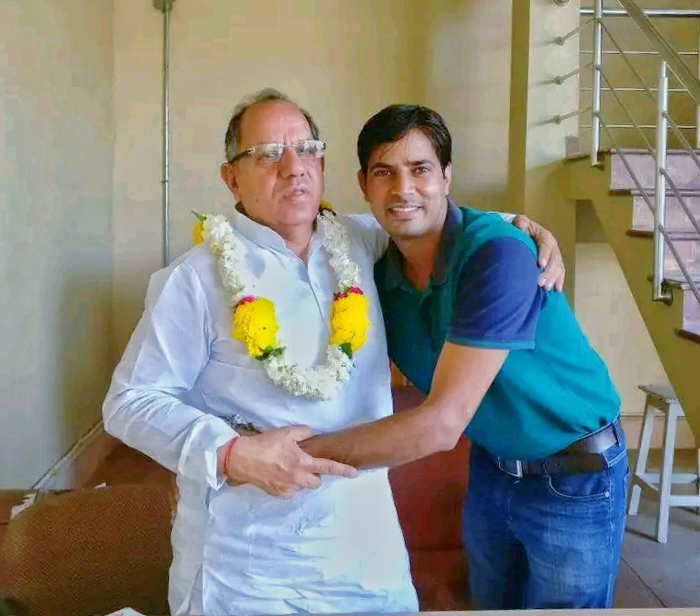
Mahariya in January 2018

== Early life and education ==
He was born on 29 September 1957 in village Kudan in the Laxmangarh, Sikar District, Rajasthan in the family of Brijmohan Maharia. He graduated from S.K. College in Sikar. He is an athlete and represented his state and university in many national level competitions. He married Sushma Maharia on 12 December 1980.

== Political career ==
=== First term in Lok Sabha ===
In 1998, he was elected to the 12th Lok Sabha as a member from the Sikar constituency. During this term, he actively participated in the Committee on Urban and Rural Development and its Sub-Committee-II on Ministry of Rural Areas and Employment. He was also part of the Joint Committee on the Functioning of Wakf Boards and the Consultative Committee for the Ministry of Tourism.

=== Second term in Lok Sabha ===
In 1999, he was re-elected to the 13th Lok Sabha for a second term.

=== Union Minister of State, Rural Development ===
From 1999 to 2004, Subhash Maharia served as the Union Minister of State for Rural Development under Prime Minister Atal Bihari Vajpayee.

=== Third term in Lok Sabha ===
In 2004, Subhash Maharia was re-elected to the 14th Lok Sabha, securing a third term.

=== Switch to INC and Return to BJP ===
In November 2016, he joined the Indian National Congress (INC). Later, in May 2023, he left the INC and rejoined the BJP.
