= Virendra Singh Burdak =

Member of Legislative Assembly

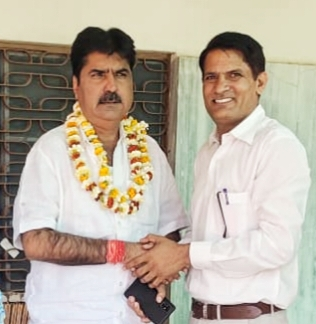
- Virendra Singh in June 2023

Member of the Rajasthan Legislative Assembly
- Incumbent
- Assumed office 2018
- Preceded by: Narayan Singh Burdak
- Constituency: Danta Ramgarh, Rajasthan

Personal details
- Born: 9 February 1968 (age 57) Dookiya , Sikar, Rajasthan, India
- Political party: Indian National Congress
- Parent: Narayan Singh Burdak
- Education: Shri Kalyan Govt. College, Sikar

Virendra Singh Burdak (born 9 February 1968) is an Indian politician. A member of the Indian National Congress, Burdak has been elected to the Rajasthan Legislative Assembly from Dantaramgarh since 2018. During the 2023 Rajasthan Legislative Assembly elections, Burdak made headlines when his estranged wife, Dr. Rita Singh contested against him from the Danta Ramgarh.

== Political career ==
Virendra is an Indian National Congress politician from Rajasthan. He contested the Dantaramgarh constituency in Sikar district, a seat previously held by his father, Narayan Singh Burdak, a senior Congress leader and former Rajasthan Pradesh Congress Committee president. In 2018, Narayan Singh announced retirement from politics, paving the way for his son, Virendra. Virendra won the seat and became the MLA from Dantaramgarh in 2018.

In the 2023 Rajasthan Legislative Assembly election, he again contested from Dantaramgarh on a Congress ticket and faced his estranged wife, Dr. Rita Singh, who contested against him as a candidate of the Jannayak Janata Party (JJP). The couple have been living separately since around 2018, and Dr. Singh had previously served as a district-chief of Sikar as a Congress leader. Virendra won the 2023 assembly election defeating BJP candidate Gajanand Kumawat and his wife and JJP candidate Dr. Rita Singh.
