= Parasram Mordiya =

Indian politician

Member of the Rajasthan Legislative Assembly
- Incumbent
- Assumed office 11 December 2018
- Constituency: Dhod

MLA
- In office 1977-1985, 1990-2003
- Constituency: Laxmangarh

Chairman of the Rajasthan Housing Board
- In office 2008 - 2013

Personal details
- Born: 2 June 1950 (age 75) Sikar, Rajasthan
- Party: Indian National Congress
- Spouse: Bhagwati Devi
- Profession: MLA, Politician, Lawyer

Parasram Mordiya (born 2 June 1950) is a senior Indian politician of Indian National Congress in state of Rajasthan and former chairman in Rajasthan Housing Board. He is former state minister of Rajasthan and former MLA, constituency of Lachhmangarh for five terms, 1977 to 1985 and 1990 to 2003.
