= Sri Madhopur =

- Municipality city

- Location in Rajasthan, India Sri Madhopur (India)
- Coordinates: 27°28′N 75°36′E
- Country: India
- State: Rajasthan
- District: Sikar
- Founder: Khushali Ram Bohra

Population (2011)
  - Total: 31,366

Languages
  - Official: Hindi, Rajasthani
- Time zone: UTC+5:30 (IST)
- PIN: 332715
- Vehicle registration: RJ-23
- Website: smprcity.com

Sri Madhopur is a city and a municipality in Sikar district in the Indian state of Rajasthan. It was founded on 18 April 1761 under the reign of Maharaja Sawai Madho Singh I. It is mainly famous for his temples. Sri Madhopur wheat market is the biggest wheat market in Sikar district. Sri Madhopur Government School is one of the biggest schools of the Sikar district. It is one of the five tehsils of the district. The dedicated Delhi-Mumbai Freight Corridor passes through the city. This city is chosen for the development of a crossing station on this route (Shri Madhopur DFC Station).

== History ==
Sri Madhopur is a city and a municipality in Sikar in the Indian state of Rajasthan. It was founded on 18 April 1761 under the reign of Maharaja Sawai Madho Singh I.

== Demographics ==
As of 2011 India census, Sri Madhopur had a population of 31,366. Males constitute 52.6% of the population and females 47.3%. Sri Madhopur has an average literacy rate of 85.53%, higher than the national average of 74.04%: male literacy is 93.69%, and female literacy is 72.45%. In Sri Madhopur, 12.24% of the population is under 6 years of age.

== Location ==
Sri Madhopur is located 12 km from the National Highway 11 (India). The nearest railway junction is at Sri Madhopur, and the nearest airport is Jaipur International Airport at Jaipur. It is 75 km from the state capital city Jaipur, and 217 km from the national capital Delhi.

=== Connectivity with Metro Cities ===
Shri Madhopur city has direct connectivity with different metro cities such as Delhi, Mumbai through railway network of India. The direct trains are available from Sri Madhopur to Mumbai, Delhi and Chandigarh.

== Temples ==
Sri Madhopur is famous for its temples like Gopinath Temple, Raghunath Temple, Khedapati Temple, Fodadas Temple etc.

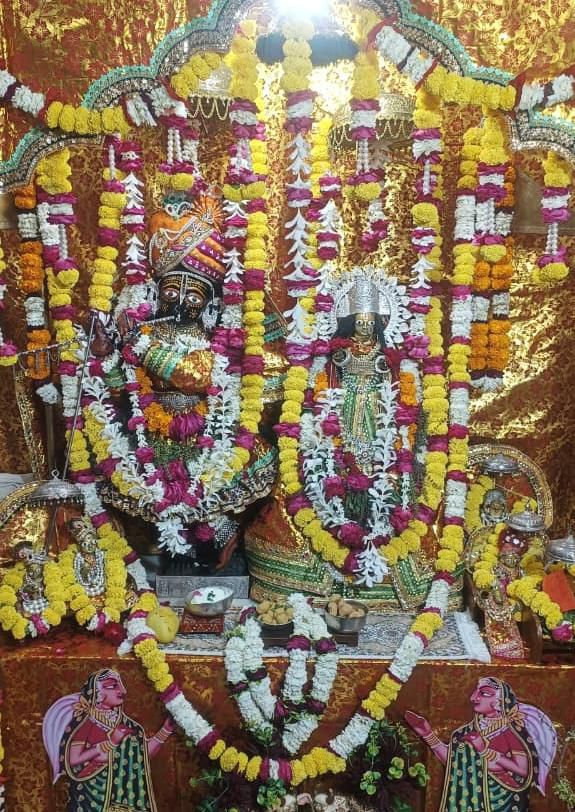
Image of The Gopinath Temple of Sri Madhopur, also called "Nagarseth" which literally means "The owner of the City".

== Ramlila ==
Every year, before 10 days of Dussehra, a Ramlila is performed in Sri Madhopur for 10 days which ends on Dussehra with the death of Ravana. People from neighbouring areas come to see it. It is free of cost, so anyone, rich or poor, higher or lower caste can come to see it. Also, anyone, of male gender, can come to perform it.

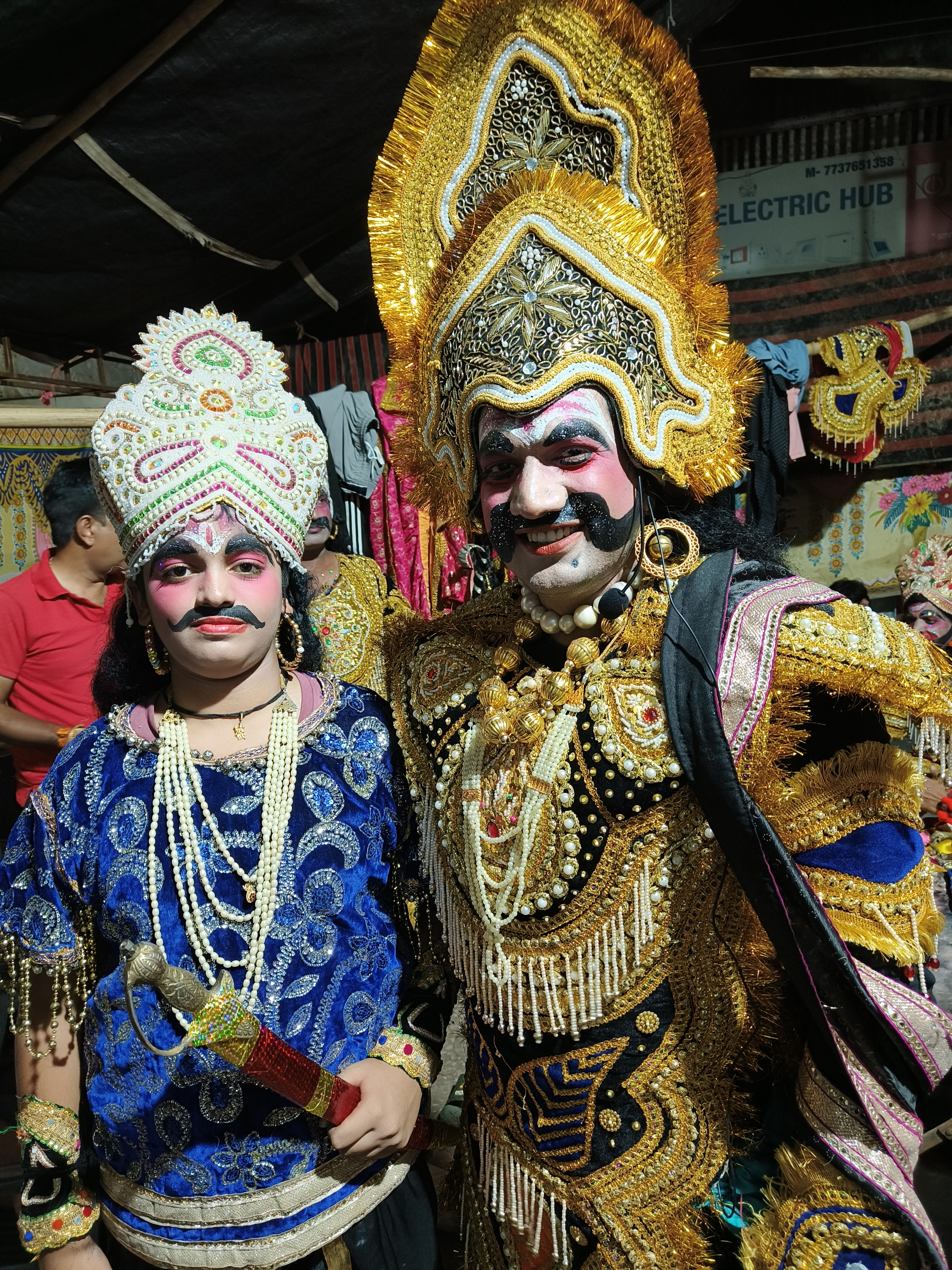
Actors dressed as Akshayakumara (left) and Ravana (right) in the Ramlila of Sri Madhopur
