= Mahadeo Singh Khandela =

Indian politician

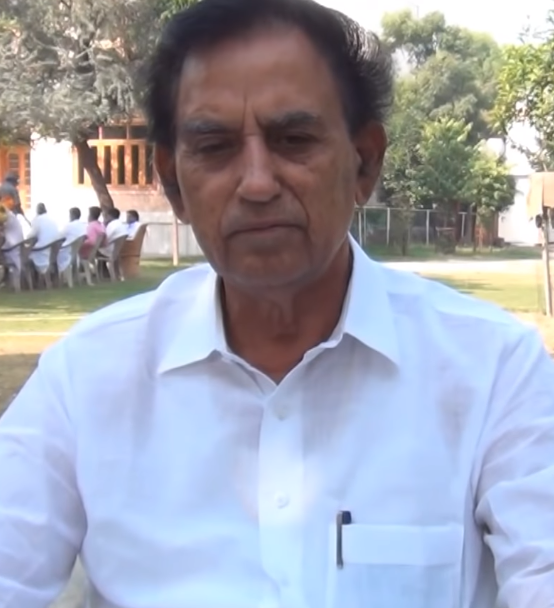

Union Minister of State Minister of Road Transport and Highways
- In office 28 May 2009 – 27 October 2012
- Preceded by: K. H. Muniyappa
- Succeeded by: Sarve Satyanarayana
- Constituency: Sikar, Rajasthan

Union Minister of State Ministry of Tribal Affairs
- In office 19 January 2011 – 27 October 2012
- Constituency: Sikar, Rajasthan

Member of the Rajasthan Legislative Assembly
- In office 1980 - 1990, 1993 - 2008, 2018 – 2023
- Constituency: Khandela, Rajasthan

Personal details
- Born: 23 September 1943 (age 82) Dulhepura Sikar, Rajasthan, India
- Party: Indian National Congress
- Spouse: Parvati Devi

Mahadeo Singh Khandela (born 23 September 1943) is an Indian politician. He served as Minister of State for Tribal Affairs between 2011 and 2012. He also served as Minister of State for Road Transport and Highways between 2009 and 2012. He was elected to the 15th Lok Sabha from Sikar. He was elected to the Rajasthan Legislative Assembly for six terms from Khandela, Rajasthan. He is a member of the Indian National Congress.

== Early life and education ==
Mahadeo Singh Khandela was born on 23 September 1943 in Dulhepura, Sikar, Rajasthan. He did Master of Arts in Economics from University of Rajasthan in 1968.
