= Bhairon Singh Shekhawat =

Vice President of India from 2002 to 2007

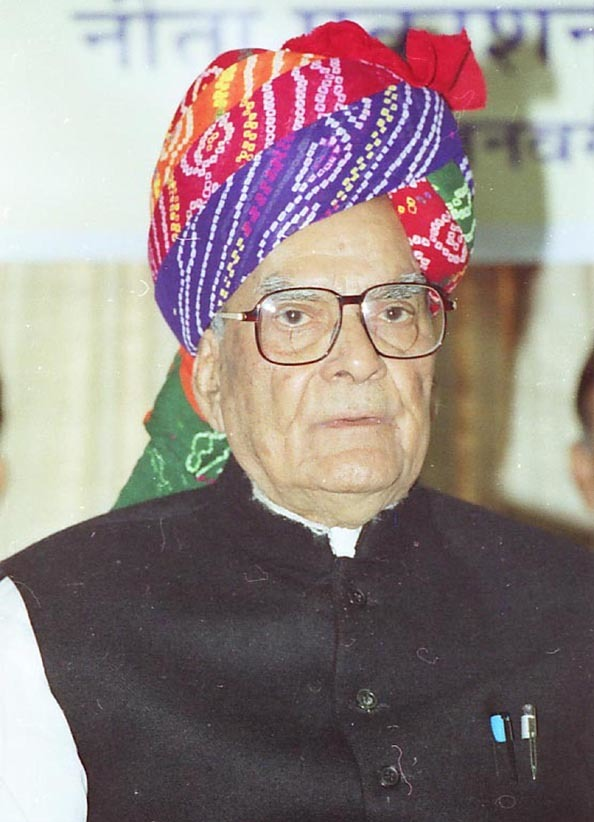
- Shekhawat in January 2004

Vice President of India
- In office 19 August 2002 – 21 July 2007
- President: A. P. J. Abdul Kalam
- Prime Minister: Atal Bihari Vajpayee; Manmohan Singh
- Preceded by: Krishan Kant
- Succeeded by: Mohammad Hamid Ansari

Chief Minister of Rajasthan
- In office 4 December 1993 – 1 December 1998
- Governor: Bali Ram Bhagat; Darbara Singh; Navrang Lal Tibrewal
- Deputy: Hari Shankar Bhabhra (from 6 October 1994)
- Preceded by: President's rule
- Succeeded by: Ashok Gehlot
- In office 4 March 1990 – 15 December 1992
- Governor: D. P. Chattopadhyaya; Sarup Singh; Marri Chenna Reddy
- Preceded by: Hari Dev Joshi
- Succeeded by: President's rule
- In office 22 June 1977 – 16 February 1980
- Governor: Raghukul Tilak
- Preceded by: Hari Dev Joshi
- Succeeded by: Jagannath Pahadia

Leader of the Opposition in Rajasthan Legislative Assembly
- In office 8 January 1999 – 18 August 2002
- Chief Minister: Ashok Gehlot
- Preceded by: Parasram Maderna
- Succeeded by: Gulab Chand Kataria

Member of Rajasthan Legislative Assembly
- In office 1993–2002
- Preceded by: Amrat Lal
- Succeeded by: Pushpendra Singh
- Constituency: Bali
- In office 1990–1993
- Preceded by: Vasundhara Raje
- Succeeded by: Banwari Lal Sharma
- Constituency: Dholpur

Personal details
- Born: 23 October 1923 Khachariyawas, Rajputana Agency, British India (present-day Rajasthan, India)
- Died: 15 May 2010 (aged 86) Jaipur, Rajasthan, India
- Party: Bharatiya Janata Party
- Spouse: Suraj Kanwar
- Children: 1

Bhairon Singh Shekhawat (23 October 1923 – 15 May 2010) was an Indian politician who served as the vice president of India. A member of the Bharatiya Janata Party, he was the first person of the party to be elected Vice President. He served in that position from August 2002, when he was elected to a five-year term by the electoral college following the death of Krishan Kant, until he resigned on 21 July 2007, after losing the presidential election to Pratibha Patil. Prior to this, served as the Chief Minister of Rajasthan three times, from 1977 to 1980, 1990 to 1992 and 1993 to 1998. He represented several constituencies in Rajasthan Vidhan Sabha from 1952 to 2002. He was awarded Padma Bhushan in the year 2003.

== Early life ==
He was born in 1923 to a Rajput family in the village of Khachriyawas, then in Sikar district, Rajputana Agency, British India. His father Devi Singh was a farmer of the village and his mother, Bane Kanwar was a housewife. He was very good in studies and completed high school but was unable to complete college due to his father's death. He had to support his family. He worked as a farmer and an officer sub-inspector of police. After working in Police Department for few years he saw his interest in the politics and joined Bharatiya Jana Sangh in 1950. In the year 1952, he resigned from the position of Police Inspector to contest Elections in Rajasthan Legislative Assembly.

== Legacy ==
Referred to as "Rajasthan Ka Ek Hi Singh" (The only lion of Rajasthan) or "Babosa" (Head of the family of Rajasthan) and affectionately as Bhairon Baba, Bhairon Singh Shekhawat entered politics in 1952. In 1952 he was MLA from Ramgarh, in 1957 from Sri Madhopur, 1962 and 1967 he was MLA from Kisan Pol. In 1972 elections he lost but in 1973 he was elected to Rajya Sabha from Madhya Pradesh. In 1975 during emergency he was arrested and sent to Rohtak jail. He remains the only Non-Congress politician to be the Chief minister of Rajasthan 3 times and was the first Vice President of India from BJP.

== Political career ==
=== Janata Party ===
After emergency in 1977 he became MLA from Chhabra as Janata Party candidate. In that year the Janata Party won 151 of the 200 seats in the state assembly elections of Rajasthan and Shekhawat took over as the first non Congress Chief Minister of Rajasthan in 1977. His government was dismissed by Indira Gandhi in 1980.

=== Bharatiya Janata Party ===
In 1980, Shekhawat joined the Bharatiya Janata Party (BJP) and became MLA again from Chabda and was leader of opposition. In 1985, he was MLA from Nimbahera. However, in 1989 an alliance between the BJP and the Janata Dal won all 25 of the Rajasthan seats in the Lok Sabha and also 138 seats (BJP:84+Janata Dal:54) in the 1990 elections to the Ninth Rajasthan Legislative Assembly. Shekhawat once again became Chief Minister of Rajasthan and was MLA from Dholpur. His government was dismissed in 1992 and President's rule imposed.

In the next elections, in 1993, Shekhawat led the BJP to be the single largest party, winning 96 seats. He himself contested from two seats, becoming MLA from Bali, but he lost from Ganganagar seat where he finished third and Congress candidate Radheshyam Ganganagar won. Three BJP-supported independents also won seats and other independents who supported the BJP took its total to 116. And Shekhawat became Chief Minister of Rajasthan for third time.

In 1998, Shekhawat was elected from Bali again but the BJP lost power and Shekhawat became Leader of Opposition in the legislative assembly. Shekhawat won every election to the Rajasthan Legislative Assembly, except in 1972 when he lost from Gandhi Nagar in Jaipur, and in Ganganagar he lost in 1993 and Congress leader Radheshyam Ganganagar won.

In the 1999 general elections, he had recommended the BJP to give Prem Singh Rathore from Hyderabad, a close friend a ticket from Maharajganj (now goshamahal) and helped him win his elections and established strong BJP presence in North Andhra Region. Shekhawat also helped Rathore in his daughters marriage by fixing the marriage with a relative.

== Vice President of India (2002–2007) ==
Shekhawat was elected as the Vice-President of India in 2002, when he defeated the opposition candidate, Sushil Kumar Shinde by a margin of 149 votes out of the 750 votes polled.

=== Presidential election, 2007 ===
In July 2007, Shekhawat fought the presidential election as an independent candidate backed by National Democratic Alliance as a popular presidential candidate next to A. P. J. Abdul Kalam; but lost to the United Progressive Alliance-Left backed candidate Pratibha Patil. He became the first vice-president to lose presidential election. Following this defeat, Shekhawat resigned from the post of vice-president on 21 July 2007.

== Notable Policies ==
=== Against Sati Pratha ===
Shekhawat played the most crucial role in removing Sati (practice) from Rajasthan as a part of their culture, especially among Rajput community, to which he belonged. At the time of 1987 when an 18 years old girl 'Roop Kanwar' was burnt as sati, then the matter came in controversy. Then at that time without thinking about his votebank, he put a total ban on this practice.

=== Antyoday Yojna ===
Shekhawat started the "Antyoday Yojna" scheme, which was intended to uplift the poorest of the poor. The chairman of the World Bank, Robert McNamara, referred to him as the Rockefeller of India.

=== Administration ===
Shekhawat was also known for his control over bureaucracy and the police. He had involvement in policies designed to improve literacy and industrialisation in Rajasthan, as well as tourism centred on the themes of heritage, wildlife and villages.

== Death ==
Bhairon Singh Shekhawat succumbed to cancer and other related health problems, and died on 15 May 2010 at the Sawai Man Singh Hospital in Jaipur. He was cremated the next day, at a plot of land provided by the government of Rajasthan, where his memorial is now built. His funeral was attended by thousands of people. He was survived by his wife, Suraj Kanwar and his only daughter, Ratan Rajvi who is married to BJP leader Narpat Singh Rajvi.

His wife, Suraj Kanwar (1927–2013), died on 9 March 2013 at the age of 86, after outliving her husband by two to three years and was cremated at Shekhawat's memorial as per her last wish.

== Awards and honours ==
- India:
  - Padma Vibhushan (2003)

== Electoral history ==
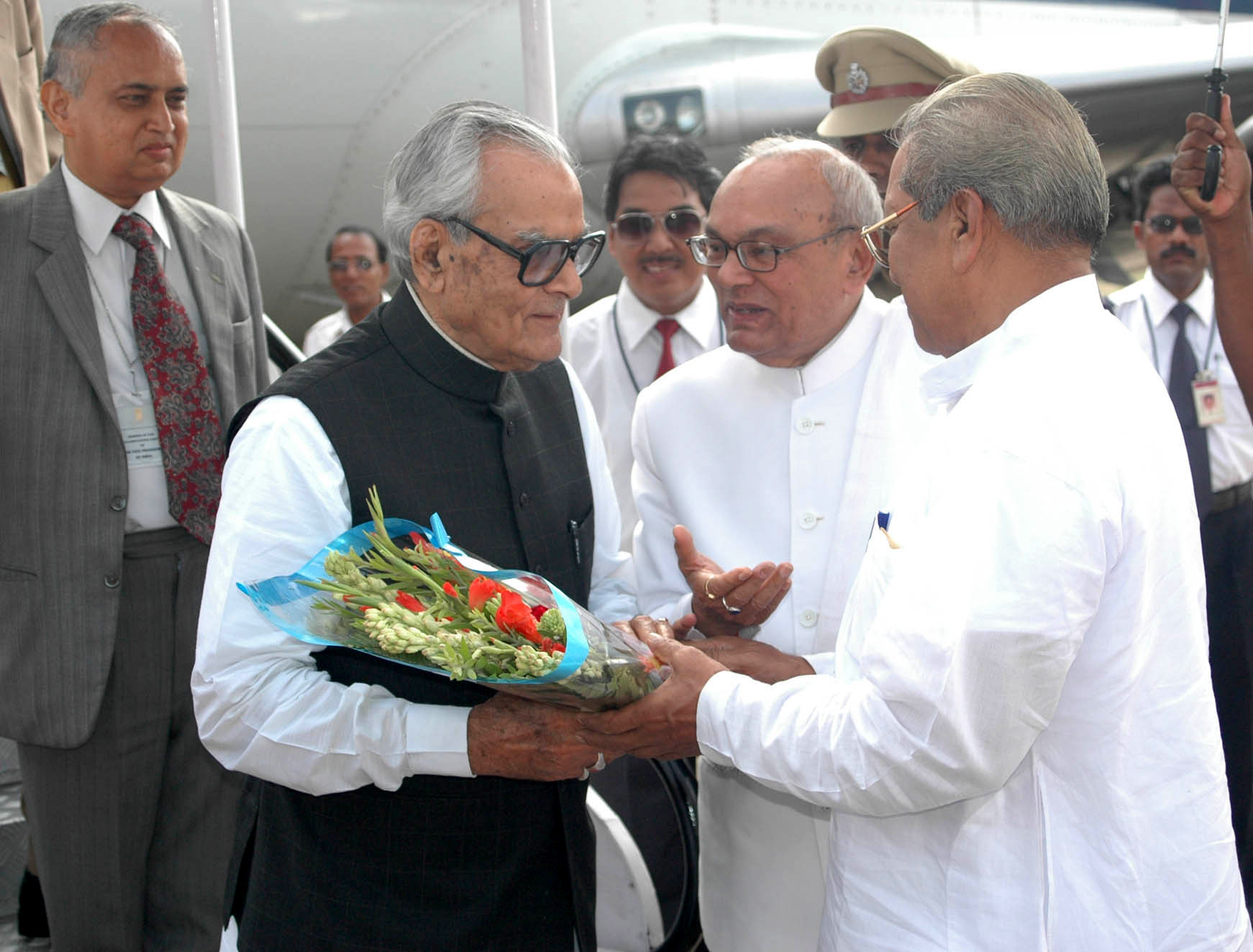
Vice President Shekhawat along with former Governor of Odisha Rameshwar Thakur.

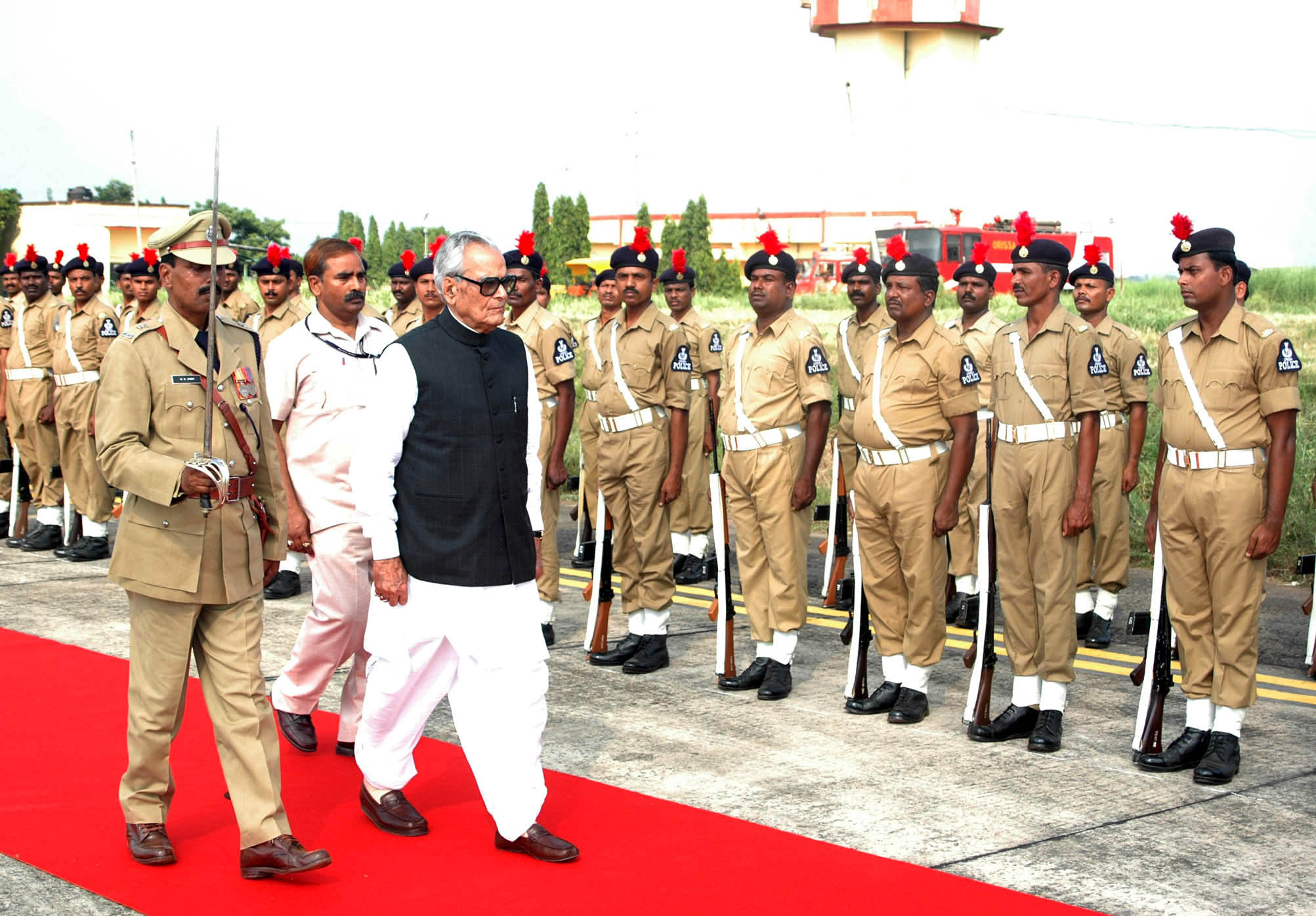
Vice President Shekhawat inspecting guard of honor at Biju Patnaik International Airport.

Shekhawat was a member of the Rajasthan Legislative Assembly on the following occasions:

- 1952 - 1957, Jana Sangh MLA from Danta-ramgarh.
- 1957 - 1962, Jana Sangh MLA from Sri Madhopur.
- 1962 - 1967, MLA from Kishanpole.
- 1967 - 1972, MLA from Kishanpole.
- 1972 : Lost from Gandhinagar as Jana Sangh candidate.
- 1974 - 1977, Rajyasabha MP from Madhya Pradesh.
- 1977 - 1980, Janata Party MLA from Chhabra, via a bypoll.
- 1980 - 1985, Bharatiya Janata Party MLA from Chhabra.
- 1985 - 1990, BJP MLA from Nimbahera. (Also won from Amber, but resigned from that seat)
- 1990 - 1992, BJP MLA from Dholpur. (Also won from Chhabra, but resigned from that seat)
- 1993 - 1998, BJP MLA from Bali. (Also contested from Ganganagar but lost that seat, finishing third)
- 1998 - 2002, BJP MLA from Bali.

== Offices held ==
He held the following offices:

- 22 June 1977 – 16 February 1980: Chief Minister of Rajasthan.
- 1980 – 90 Leader of the Opposition, Rajasthan Legislative Assembly.
- 4 March 1990 – 15 December 1992: Chief Minister of Rajasthan.
- 4 December 1993 – 29 November 1998: Chief Minister of Rajasthan.
- December 1998 – August 2002: Leader of the Opposition, Rajasthan Legislative Assembly.
- 19 August 2002 – 21 July 2007: Vice-President of India.

== See also ==
- First Bhairon Singh Shekhawat ministry
- Bhairon Singh Shekhawat ministry (1990–1992)

Political offices
Preceded by Hari Dev Joshi	Chief Minister of Rajasthan; 1977–1980	Succeeded by Jagannath Pahadia
Preceded by Hari Dev Joshi	Chief Minister of Rajasthan; 1990–1992	Succeeded by President's rule
Preceded by President's rule	Chief Minister of Rajasthan; 1993–1998	Succeeded by Ashok Gehlot
Preceded by Krishan Kant	Vice-President of India; 2002–2007	Succeeded by Mohammad Hamid Ansari
