= Chand Singh of Sikar =

Rao of Sikar from 1756 to 1763

Chand Singh

Rao of Sikar
- Reign: 1756 – 1763
- Predecessor: Nahar Singh
- Successor: Devi Singh
- Died: 1763
- Issue: Devi Singh
- House: Sikar
- Dynasty: Shekhawat
- Father: Shiv Singh
- Mother: Mertaniji

Chand Singh was Rao of Sikar (in Rajputana) from 1756 until his death in 1763.

== Early life ==
Chand Singh was born to Shiv Singh and his third wife, Mertaniji, who was from Loonwa. While his father was in Jaipur, a dispute occurred in Fatehpur, during which his eldest brother, Samrath Singh, killed two of his half-brothers, Kirat Singh and Medh Singh. To save himself, he fled with his brother, Budh Singh. When his father was severely wounded in 1748 during the Battle of Bagru, he traveled to Jaipur to care for him. Before his death, his father, in the presence of Ishwari Singh, disowned Samrath Singh due to his involvement in the fratricidal killing of his half-brothers and appointed Chand as his heir and successor. Following the death of Shiv Singh, Ishwari Singh recognized and declared him as the Rao of Sikar. However, Samrath also proclaimed himself as the Rao of Sikar. To prevent any conflict, he went to Sikar and began residing peacefully with his eldest brother, Samrath Singh. When Ishwari Singh traveled to Merta to assist Ram Singh, he, along with Samrath, had joined forces with him. Their absence from Fatehpur provided an opportunity for the Qaimkhanis to seize control of the city. Upon learning of this, Samrath Singh sent Chand to reclaim Fatehpur. He immediately advanced toward Fatehpur, where, accompanied by the Mertias of Loonwas and Ladkhanis, he launched an attack on the Qaimkhanis and reclaimed Fatehpur. Later, when the Qaimkhanis engaged in battle against Sardul Singh at Loomas, he, along with his brother Budh Singh, supported Sardul Singh. He then stayed in Fatehpur, but Samrath Singh objected to this and instructed him to move to Balaran. He immediately complied and relocated there. In 1751, he constructed a fortress at Balaran.

== Succession ==
Two years after the death of Samrath Singh in 1746, during the rule of his nephew Nahar Singh over Sikar, Chand Singh and his brother Budh Singh conspired to overthrow him and take control of Sikar. Due to Nahar Singh's incompetence and lack of popularity among his subjects, they also received the support of Madho Singh. He, along with his mother Mertaniji, his brother Budh Singh, and their family, traveled to Harsh under the pretext of visiting the Harshnath temple to conduct the mundan ceremony of his son Devi Singh. Their party arrived at Sikar in the middle of the night and asked Dip Chand, the qiladar, to open the fort gates so they could rest for a few hours. Once the gates were opened, they launched a surprise attack which caught the fort's occupants off guard. In the attack, Dip Chand and his twelve companions were killed. After taking control of the fort, he sent the wives of his brother, Samrath Singh, and his nephew, Nahar Singh, to Fatehpur. Nahar Singh attempted to recapture Sikar but was defeated. To avoid further conflict, a compromise was reached between him and Nahar Singh in which certain estates were granted in perpetuity to Nahar Singh and his brothers. He was subsequently declared the Rao of Sikar.

== Reign ==
One of the first actions he took after assuming the throne was to remove the name of Samrath Singh and his descendants from the family records due to his involvement in the killing of his stepbrothers. Shortly thereafter, he summoned Padam Singh and Bhao Singh, the sons of his late brothers Kirat Singh and Medh Singh, to Sikar, and granted them the jagirs of Bathoth, Patoda, Sarwari, and Deeppura for their maintenance. He rendered valuable services to the state of Jaipur.

== Personal life ==
In 1753, a son named Devi Singh was born to him in Balaran.

== Death ==
He died in 1763 and was succeeded by his son Devi Singh.
