= Shiv Singh of Sikar =

Rao of Sikar from 1721 to 1748

Shiv Singh

Rao of Sikar
- Reign: 1721 – 1748
- Predecessor: Daulat Singh
- Successor: Samrath Singh
- Died: 1748
- Issue: Samrath Singh; Chand Singh; Kirat Singh; Medh Singh; Budh Singh; Suraj Kumari
- House: Sikar
- Dynasty: Shekhawat
- Father: Daulat Singh

Shiv Singh (or Sheo Singh) was the Rao of Sikar from 1721 until his death in 1748, an area within Rajputana.

== Reign ==
In 1721, upon the death of his father, Daulat Singh, he succeeded him as Rao of Sikar. His father began constructing the fort and palace at Sikar during his lifetime but died before they were completed. Shiv oversaw their completion. He built a defensive wall around the town of Sikar and fortified it. He erected the temple of Gopinathji. He also built a Shiva temple near the Harshnath temple. Soon after, a Seth from Agra was looted by robbers who carried away all his silver. Sardar Singh of Kasli sent a false report to the Delhi authorities claiming that it was done by Shiv Singh. To recover the booty and dismantle the fort and defense wall of Sikar, the Delhi authorities sent an army under the command of Jannisbar Khan. Seeing this, he requested Jai Singh II to intervene, and using his influence, Jai Singh sent Khan back to Delhi. He annexed Fatehpur in Sikar following his victory in the war against the Qaimkhanis. Over the years, the Mughal Empire was weakening, and the Marathas were rising in power. Seeing this, and knowing that Shekhawati was always on the verge of attacks, it became necessary to have a powerful ally to rely on in times of war and conflict. He met Jai Singh, his kin, a powerful ruler who held considerable influence. This meeting took place at Mauzmabad, where Shiv accepted Jai suzerainty and became a tributary of Jaipur.

== Personal life ==
=== Marriage ===
He had four wives. He married first Mertaniji from Maroth. His second wife Champawatji was from Pali. His third wife also a Mertaniji was from Loonwa. His fourth wife was Bidawatji from Dantru.

=== Children ===
He was the father of five sons and a daughter. They were:

By his first wife, he had one son and one daughter:

- Samrath Singh
- Suraj Kumari who was married to Umaid Singh, Rajadhiraj of Shahpura.

By his second wife, he had two sons:

- Kirat Singh. He had a son:
  - Padam Singh, born posthumously.
- Medh Singh. He had a son:
  - Bhao Singh, born posthumously.

Both Kirat and Medh were killed by their brother Samrath Singh at Fatehpur. This left Shiv Singh heartbroken, and he never returned to Sikar or Fatehpur afterward. When their mother learned of their killing, she wore white, the color worn in mourning, and took her daughters-in-law and left Sikar. When their father, Shiv, came to know of this episode, he arrived just in time from Jaipur and convinced his wife not to go to her paternal home but to stay at Patoda. He sent his daughter-in-laws to their homes. And that's where, in time, they both gave birth to sons.

By his third wife, he had two sons:

- Chand Singh
- Budh Singh

== Death ==
Following the death of Jai Singh, the Battle of Bagru ensued between Madho Singh and Ishwari Singh. He participated in the battle and received a serious wound while fighting against the Marathas. Ishwari Singh made prompt arrangements for his treatment and visited him daily. His son Chand Singh stayed with him and took care of him. At first, he was recovering, but later his illness worsened, and he died in 1748.
