= Devi Singh of Sikar =

Rao of Sikar from 1763 to 1795

Devi Singh

Rao of Sikar
- Reign: 1763 – 1795
- Predecessor: Chand Singh
- Successor: Lakshman Singh
- Born: 1753
- Died: 1795 (aged 41–42)
- Issue: Lakshman Singh (adoptive)
- House: Sikar
- Dynasty: Shekhawat
- Father: Chand Singh

Devi Singh was the Rao of Sikar (in Rajputana) from 1763 until his death in 1795.

== Early life and family ==
He was born in 1753 in Balaran to Chand Singh. As he had no children, he adopted Lakshman Singh, the son of the Thakur of Shahpura, as his son and heir.

== Succession ==
Upon the death of his father Chand Singh in 1763, Devi succeeded him as Rao of Sikar. At the time of his succession, he was only ten years old. Consequently, his uncle, Budh Singh, was appointed regent to govern on his behalf until he reached the age of majority. When the Battle of Maonda was fought between Madho Singh I of Jaipur and Jawahar Mal of Bharatpur, Budh Singh participated in it with the forces of Sikar. He fell in the battle, and for his meritorious service, Madho Singh permanently reduced the tribute paid by Sikar to Jaipur by 4,000 rupees. To commemorate the memory of his uncle Budh Singh, Devi erected his cenotaph at Katrathal. In 1779[Battleof khatu], when Murtaza Khan Bhadech came to Shekhawati with an army of 52,000 to collect revenue on behalf of the Mughal emperor of Delhi, he wrote to Devi Singh to send him at once the expenditures incurred in the campaign. In response, he wrote back that he was a vassal of Jaipur and Bhadech had nothing to do with Sikar. When Bhadech subsequently marched toward Jaipur, he was blocked by the forces of Jaipur at Khatu. Devi participated in this battle along with the forces of other Shekhawat chiefs and supported Jaipur. The battle was won by Jaipur, and in recognition of the meritorious services rendered by him during it, Pratap Singh exempted 9,000 rupees in perpetuity from the annual tribute that Sikar paid to Jaipur. He renovated the Jamoon Mahal and redecorated the Gopinath temple in the 1780s. He built a fort at Deogarh in 1784. Raja of Khandela objected to its construction and sent a force to stop it but it was of no use. He also built the fort of Raghunathgarh in 1791. He founded the town of Ramgarh in 1793. When Sheo Singh, Thakur of Churu, imposed heavy taxes on the Poddars, they approached him. He asked them to move to Ramgarh. He enlarged his estate by adding no fewer than twenty-five large villages including Lohagarh and Koh. When he found that frequent conflicts between the senior and junior branches of the rulers of Khandela had left the senior branch financially, militarily, and administratively weak, he saw an opportunity. He attacked the senior branch and annexed 28 villages of its estate into Sikar. He had his eyes set on taking Raiwasa, but before he could attack it, he died.

== Death ==
He died in 1795 at Sikar and was succeeded by Lakshman Singh. After his death, a chhatri was erected in his memory. Its dome features the work of Lala Ram Chitera and eighty painted panels.
