= Samrath Singh of Sikar =

Rao of Sikar from 1748 to 1754

Samrath Singh

Rao of Sikar
- Reign: 1748 – 1754
- Predecessor: Shiv Singh
- Successor: Nahar Singh
- Died: 1754
- Issue: Nahar Singh
- House: Sikar
- Dynasty: Shekhawat
- Father: Shiv Singh
- Mother: Mertaniji

Samrath Singh was Rao of Sikar (then part of Rajputana) from 1748 until his death in 1754.

== Early life ==
Samrath Singh was born to Shiv Singh and his wife, Mertaniji, who was from Maroth. When his father became a tributary of Jaipur, he left the management of his estates, including Sikar and Fatehpur, to him and proceeded to Jaipur. Following a quarrel that arose in Fatehpur, he killed his two half-brothers, Kirat Singh and Medh Singh. This act caused his father such grief that he never again returned to Sikar or Fatehpur.

== Reign ==
Upon his father's death in 1748, he declared himself the Rao of Sikar. Soon after, when Ishwari Singh went to Merta to assist his son-in-law Ram Singh, Samrath and his brother Chand Singh joined him with their forces. Taking advantage of his absence, the Qaimkhanis seized Fatehpur. Upon hearing this, he stayed with Ishwari Singh but dispatched Chand Singh to reclaim Fatehpur.

== Death ==
He died in 1754 and was succeeded by his son Nahar Singh.

== Legacy ==
When his half-brother, Chand Singh, ascended the throne of Sikar, he ordered the removal of Samrath and his descendants' names from the family genealogy due to Samrath's involvement in the deaths of their half-brothers, Kirat Singh and Medh Singh.
