= Dowlat Singh =

Rao of Sikar from 1687 to 1721

Rao of Sikar
- Reign: 1687 – 1721
- Successor: Shiv Singh
- Died: 1721
- Issue: Shiv Singh
- House: Sikar
- Dynasty: Shekhawat
- Father: Jaswant Singh

Dowlat Singh (or Daulat Singh) was the Rao of Sikar from 1687 until his death in 1721.

== Birth ==
He was born to Jaswant Singh of Kasli.

== Reign ==
He succeeded his father at the age of 14. To atone for killing his father, Bahadur Singh, the Raja of Khandela, visited Dujodh and took Dowlat, then fourteen-year-old, to Khandela with him. Bahadur hosted him there for a period with warmth and care. In 1687, Bahadur Singh granted him a region known as Virbhan-ka-Bas. He renamed the place Sikar after his ancestor Shekha. In the same year, he laid the foundation of a fort at Sikar. He constructed a temple dedicated to Mohanji. Upon learning that the Thakur of Jagmalpura had captured his mare and mistreated its rider, he led an offensive against Jagmalpura. He was supported in this effort by Fateh Singh from Dujodh and Dip Singh from Kasli. Following his victory, he expelled the Thakur and his family and took control of Jagmalpura, along with Chainpura and Dadi. To avenge his father's murder, he killed Bahadur Singh's younger brother, Bhupat Singh. He subsequently incorporated seven of Bhupat's villages into his estate.

He was a trusted confidant of Jai Singh II.

== Personal life ==
When his eldest son, Shiv Singh, was born, he constructed a Shiva temple on the hill of Harsh.

== Death ==
He died in Sikar in 1721 and was succeeded by his son Shiv Singh.
