= Nahar Singh (disambiguation) =

Nahar Singh (died 1858) was the Raja of the princely state of Ballabhgarh in India.

Nahar Singh may also refer to:

- Nahar Singh of Bharatpur (1672–1697), ruler of Bharatpur state
- Nahar Singh of Shahpura (1855–1932), ruler of Shahpura state
- Nahar Singh of Sikar (died 1756), Rao of Sikar
