= Rampratap Singh =

Rao Raja of Sikar from 1833 to 1850

Ram Pratap Singh

Rao Raja of Sikar
- Reign: 1833 – 1850
- Predecessor: Lakshman Singh
- Successor: Bhairon Singh
- Regent: Rani Rathorji
- Died: 1850
- House: Sikar
- Dynasty: Shekhawat
- Father: Lakshman Singh
- Mother: Rani Rathorji

Ram Pratap Singh (or Rampratap Singh) was the Rao Raja of Sikar from 1833 to until his death in 1850.

== Reign ==
He succeeded his father, Lakshman Singh, at the age of four in 1833. Since he was a minor, his mother, Rani Rathorji, became regent and managed the administration of Sikar on his behalf. His predecessor, Lakshman Singh, had given large estates to his three illegitimate children during his lifetime. They originally possessed the forts of Fatehpur, Laxmangarh, and Ramgarh, which were later taken from them through much diplomacy in exchange for Singrawat, Nechpa, and fifty villages. He requested Colonel J. Sutherland, who was the Agent to the Governor-General for the states of Rajputana, for their restoration to him. The then Government of India found his request reasonable and helped him dispose of his illegitimate brothers and claim their estates. He introduced many reforms.

== Death ==
In 1850 he died without any heirs and was succeeded by Bhairon Singh.
