= Ramji (painter) =

Painter (fl. 1755–1785)

Ramji Das Chitera
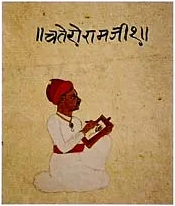
- Painting of the artist Ramji Das, ca.1780
- Style: Jaipur School

Ramji (fl. 1755–1785), also known as Ramji Das, was a painter based in Jaipur State. He specialized in portrait-painting and was active during the reigns of Madho Singh I and Prithvi Singh II (r. 1768–1785). (Note: His name is appended with the suffix with 'Chatera' or 'Chitera'.) He painted in a style which is now known as the Jaipur School. Some of his works depict officials that belonged to the court of the maharaja, without discriminating based on rank or status, even depicting courtesans (kalawants) or performers (bhaktans). Ramji had a group of followers, with another painter named Govinda painted in a similar style to Ramji.

Ramji first appears on record in the early 1760's, with his salary being increased from 6 to 10 rupees in 1762. He was one of the two most-renowned artists of the Jaipur court, alongside Sahibram. Originally from Jaipur, at one point Ramji was sent to work at Jaiselmer.

== Surviving works ==
Some of his surviving works are kept in the collection of the Jaipur Museum and the personal collection of Kumar Sangram Singh. 81 paintings inscribed with Ramji's name can be found in the collection of the Maharaja Sawai Man Singh II Museum whilst a further 200 in other collections can be traced to him. Much of the surviving works are khakhas (smaller sketches or drafts for larger paintings), monochromatic drawings, tinted-line drawings, or coloured figure studies. Many of the works were created with single-layered, hand-made, burnished paper whilst others are coloured paintings on vasli.

== Gallery ==
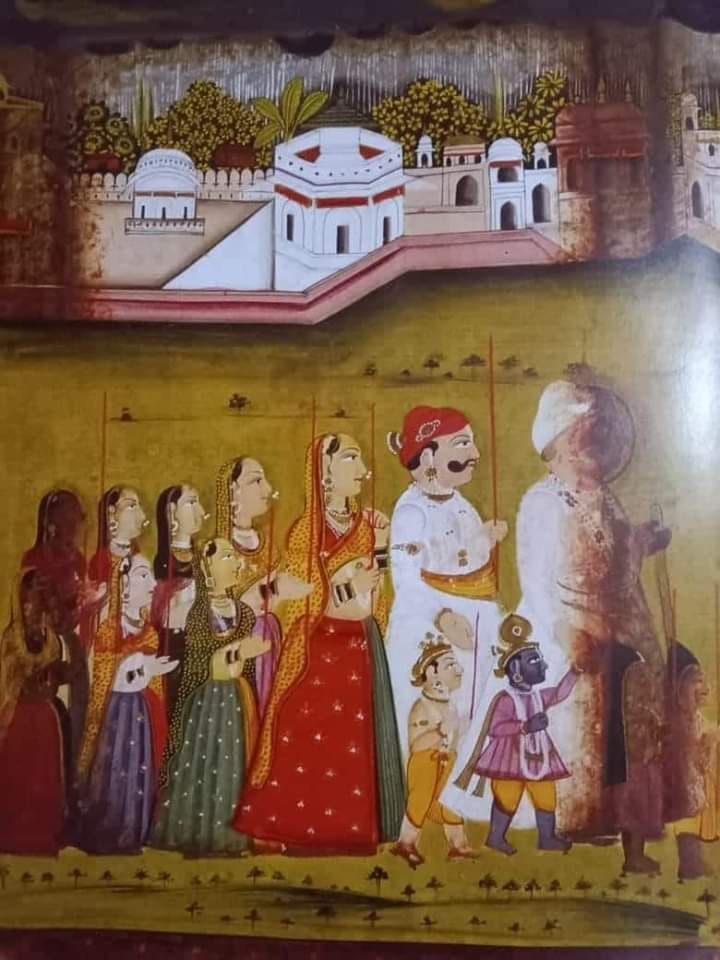
Painting of Raja Badan Singh of Bharatpur State holding hands with Bala Krishna, with prince Jawahar Singh behind him, from an illustrated 'Sujan Charitra' series, by Ramji, Jaipur School, circa mid-to-late 18th century

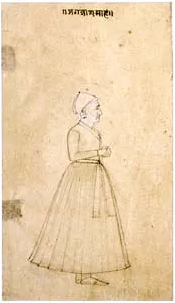
Painting of Pandit Jagannath, by Ramji, ca.1780

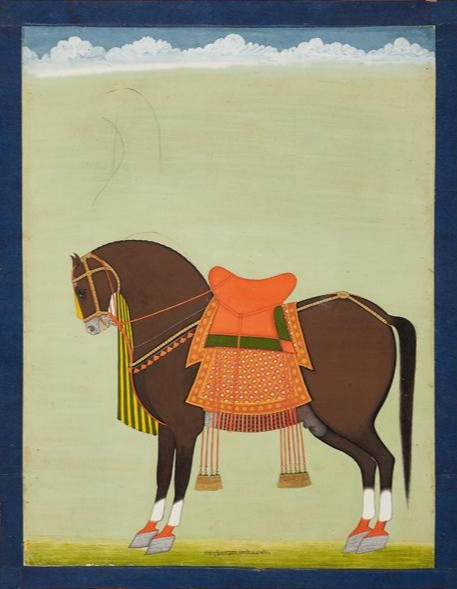
Portrait of the horse Raghunath Prasad, by Ramji, Jaipur, ca.1750–70

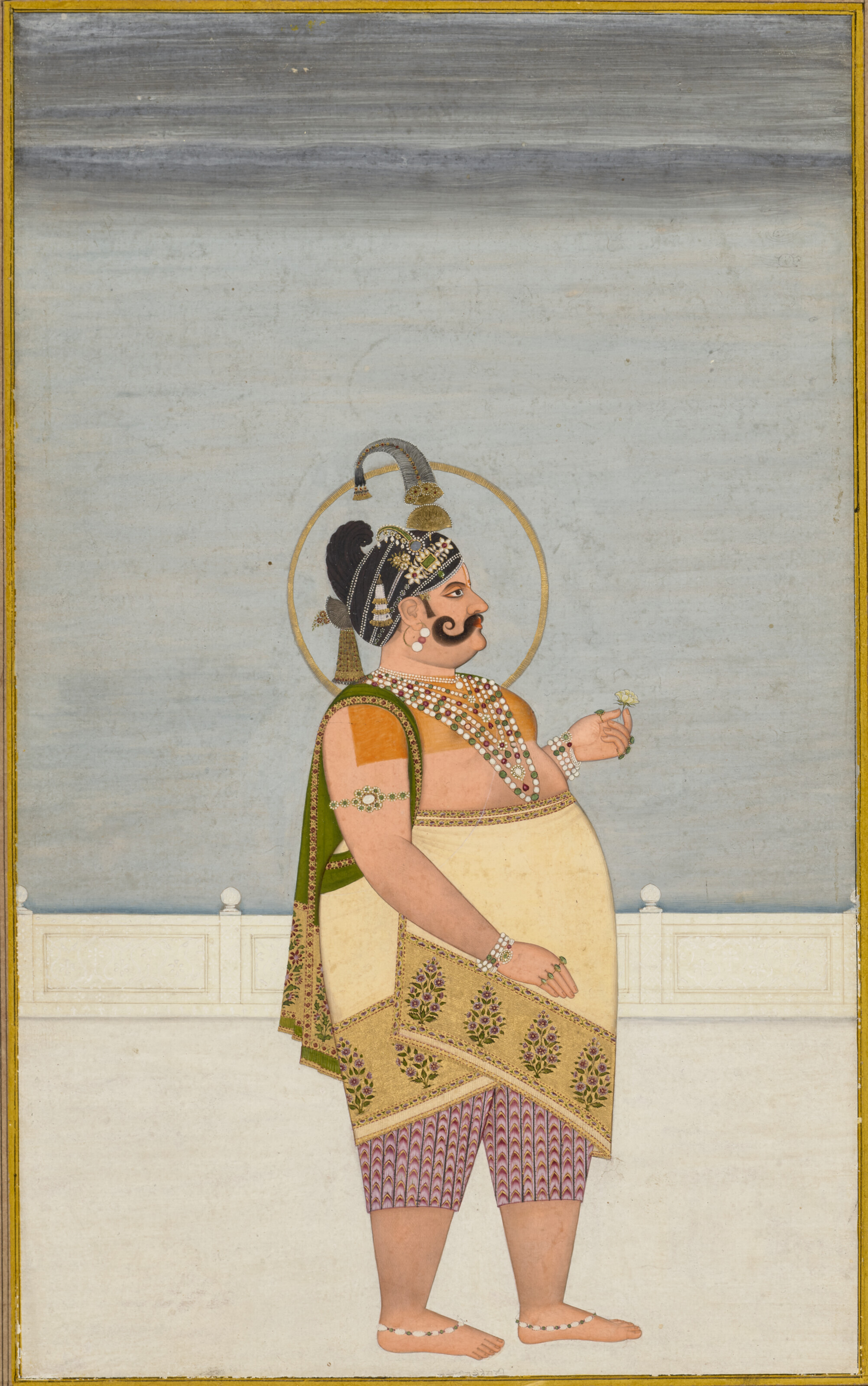
Painting of Madho Singh I of Jaipur State, attributed to Ramji, Jaipur, ca.1760

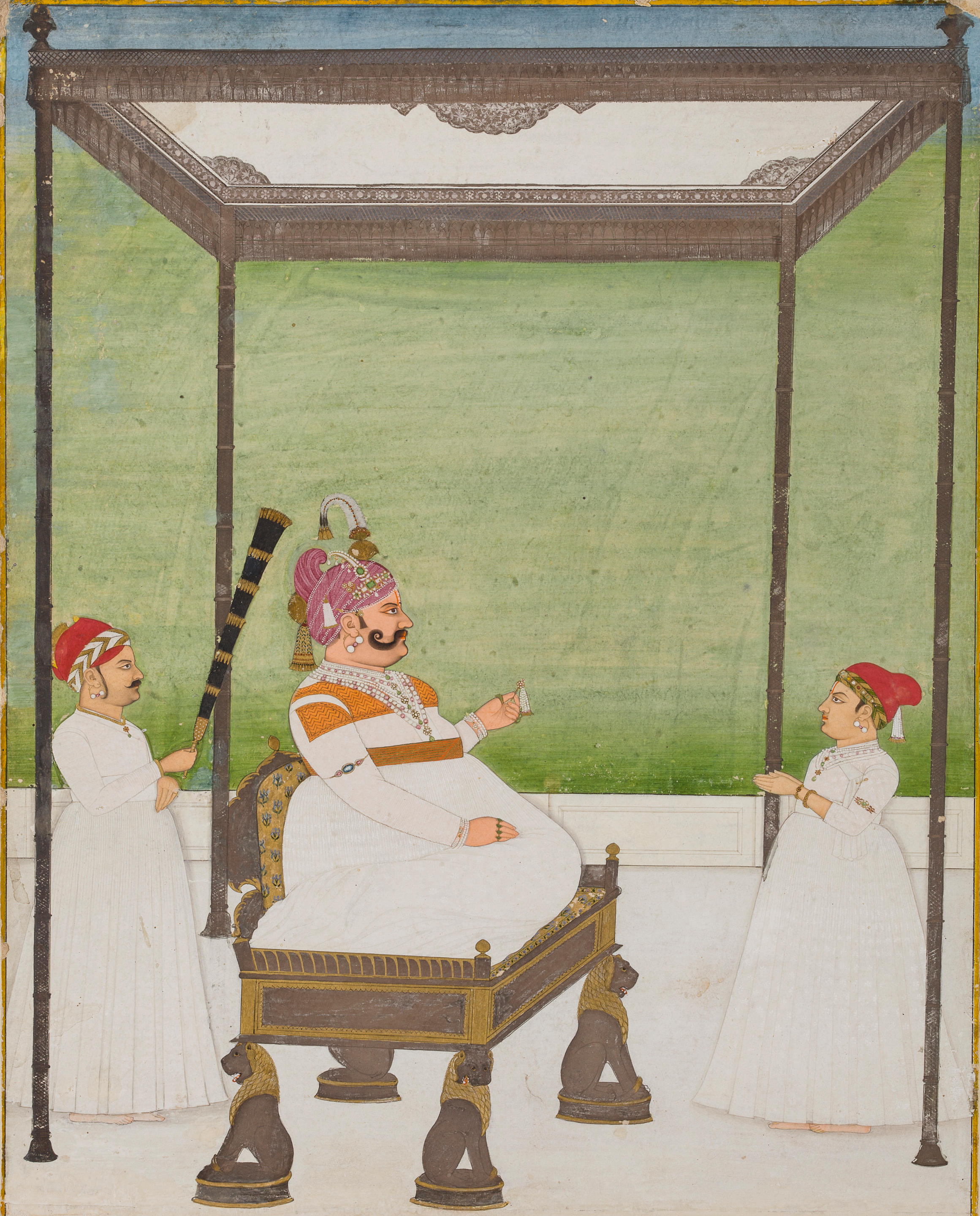
Painting of Madho Singh I of Jaipur State with court attendants, attributed to Ramji, Jaipur, ca.1760

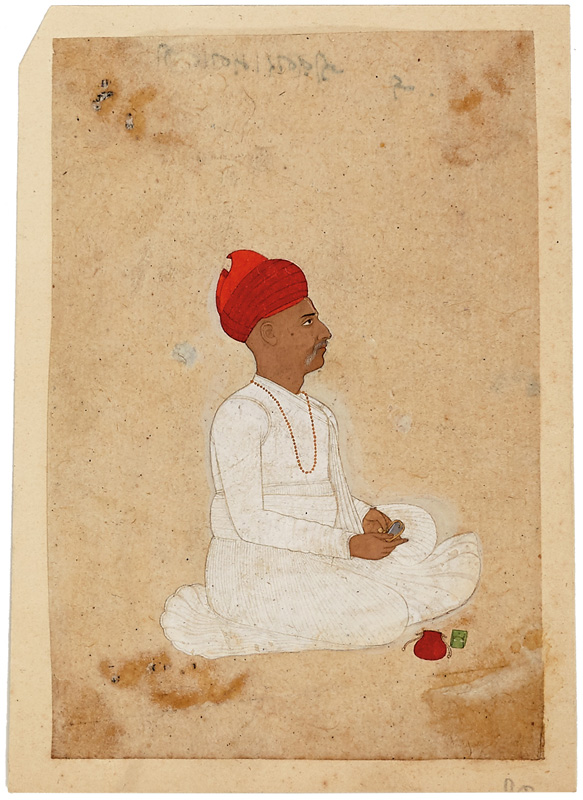
Painting of Jivan Ram, merchant from Jaipur, attributed to Ramji, ca.1780
