= Qaimkhani Boli =

Dialect of the Rajasthani language

- قیَمخانی بولی; कैमख़ानी बोली; قائمخاني ٻولي
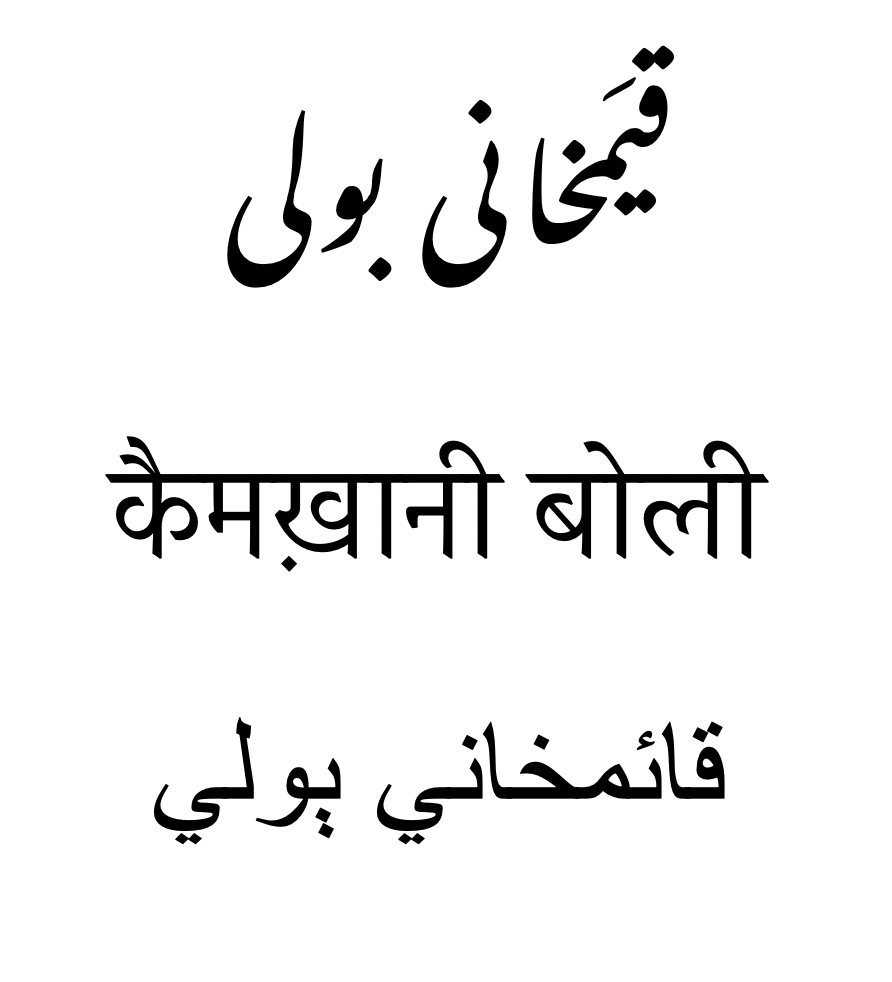
- "Qaimkhani Boli" written in the Urdu (Nastaliq) script, the Devanagari script and Sindhi script
- Native to: India, Pakistan
- Region: Rajasthan, Sindh
- Ethnicity: Qaimkhani
- Language family: Indo-European: Indo-Iranian; Indo-Aryan; Western; Rajasthani; Qaimkhani Boli
- Writing system: Urdu (Nastaliq), Devanagari, Sindhi

Language codes
- ISO 639-3: None (mis)

Qaimkhani Boli (also known as the Qaimkhani dialect) is a dialect of the Rajasthani languages. It is historically associated with the Shekhawati region of Rajasthan, India, and is spoken by the Qaimkhani community of Pakistan and India. Following the partition of India in 1947, a significant population of speakers migrated to Pakistan.

== History ==
The dialect is named after the Qaimkhani ethnic group. The community traces its lineage to Karm Chand, a Chauhan Rajput prince of Dadrera and son of Mote Rao Chauhan. Karm Chand converted to Islam during the reign of Firuz Shah Tughlaq and was renamed Kaimkhan. His descendants, and the dialect they spoke, eventually inherited this name.

Linguistically, the dialect evolved within the Shekhawati region (including areas such as Fatehpur and Jhunjhunu). While it maintains a distinct identity, it is intrinsically linked to Marwari, to the extent that it is sometimes considered a sub-dialect of the Marwari language itself.

== Phonology ==
Qaimkhani Boli exhibits specific phonetic characteristics that distinguish it from standard Urdu and Hindi, often sharing these features with other Rajasthani dialects.

=== Consonants ===
The dialect undergoes specific consonantal shifts.

- Substitution of Qaf (ق): The uvular plosive /q/ is consistently replaced by the velar plosive /k/ (ک). For example, the word قائم خانی (Qaimkhani) is pronounced کیمخانی (Kaimkhani).
- Retroflex Lateral Flap (ݪ): The dialect utilizes the retroflex lateral flap /ɭ/, a sound present in Marwari but absent in standard Urdu. This distinction is phonemic; for instance, جل (Jal - with a standard 'l') means "water", whereas جݪ (Jal - with the retroflex 'L') refers to "burning".

=== Vowels ===
There is a tendency to alter vowel endings compared to standard Urdu:

- Words ending in the long vowel 'a' (Alif) in Urdu often end in 'o' (Waw) in Qaimkhani Boli. For example, کھانا (Khana - food/to eat) becomes کھانو (Khano).
- The 'Ain' (ع) sound is generally dropped or replaced by a simple Alif (ا). For instance, عسراف (Israf) becomes اسراف (Asraf).

== Grammar ==
The morphological structure of Qaimkhani Boli shows significant divergence from Urdu, particularly in its pronoun system, verb conjugation, and tense markers.

=== Pronouns ===
The dialect uses a specific set of personal pronouns that differ from standard Urdu/Hindi forms:

Person	Urdu Equivalent	Qaimkhani Boli
I (1st Singular)	میں (Main)	مھیں / مھاں (Mhe / Mhan)
We (1st Plural)	ہم (Hum)	آپاں / مھانے (Aapan / Mhane)
You (2nd Singular)	تو (Tu)	تھوں / تیں (Thon / Tain)
You (2nd Plural)	تم (Tum)	تھے / تھام (The / Tham)
He/She (3rd Singular)	وہ (Woh)	وو / وا (Wo / Wa)
They (3rd Plural)	وہ (Woh)	وے (We)

=== Verbs and Tenses ===
- Infinitives: The infinitive marker in Qaimkhani is typically -no (نو) rather than the Urdu -na (نا).
  - Urdu: آنا (Aana - to come) → Qaimkhani: آنو (Aano).
  - Urdu: جانا (Jana - to go) → Qaimkhani: جانو (Jano).
- Past Auxiliary: The auxiliary verb for the past tense is ہو (Ho) for masculine singular, compared to the Urdu تھا (Tha).
  - Urdu: وہ گیا تھا (Woh gaya tha - He went).
  - Qaimkhani: وو گیو ہو (Wo gayo ho).

=== Postpositions ===
The dialect employs distinct postpositions (case markers):

- The genitive marker کا (Ka) in Urdu becomes کو (Ko) in Qaimkhani.
- The oblique genitive کے (Ke) often becomes کا (Ka) or را (Ra).
- The dative/accusative marker کو (Ko) in Urdu is replaced by نے (Ne/Nai).

== Vocabulary ==
The vocabulary of Qaimkhani Boli is deeply rooted in Rajasthani and Marwari traditions, with numerous terms that do not exist in Urdu or Hindi.

English	Urdu	Qaimkhani Boli
Here	یہاں (Yahan)	اٹھے (Athey)
There	وہاں (Wahan)	بٹھے (Bathey)
Where	کہاں (Kahan)	کٹھے (Kathey)
When	کب (Kab)	کد (Kad)
Who	کون (Kaun)	کن (Kun)
Good	اچھا (Acha)	چوکھو (Chokho)
Boy	لڑکا (Larka)	چورو (Choro)
Girl	لڑکی (Larki)	چوری (Chori)

== Writing system ==
Qaimkhani Boli is primarily an oral language and does not possess a unique alphabet. Its method of transcription depends on the geographic region of the speaker:

- In Pakistan, it is almost always written using the Urdu (Nastaliq) script. The Sindhi script is utilised occasionally.
- In India, the dialect is mainly written using the Devanagari script.

== Literature ==
The literary heritage of the dialect is linked to the broader Rajasthani tradition. A seminal work is the Qaim Khan Raso (قائم خان راسو), written by Jan Kavi (Naimat Khan), the son of Nawab Alif Khan. This text serves as a poetic history of the Qaimkhani people and illustrates the linguistic blend of the era, incorporating elements of Apabhramsha and local Marwari forms.
