= Sikar (estate) =

Shekhawat Estate in Jaipur

The Estate of Sikar was the largest chiefship in Jaipur, and its head held the title of Rao Raja. Rao Raja was a vassal of Jaipur State and functioned as a subordinate to it. The family seat of administration was at Sikar.

== Area ==
The estate included around 440 villages and covered an area of approximately 1,400 square miles (3,625 km²). The territory was divided into seven tehsils for administrative purposes. These were Reengus, Sikar, Singrawat, Nechwa, Laxmangarh, Fatehpur, and Ramgarh.

== Geography ==
It was bounded to the north by Bikaner State, to the east by Shekhawati, a nizamat of Jaipur, to the south by Sambhar, another nizamat of Jaipur, and to the west by Bikaner State and Jodhpur State. Sikar had a total of nine forts.

== History ==
Raisal, a Shekhawat, was a favorite of Akbar, and his descendants went on to establish a series of estates in Rajputana. His descendants are known by the patronymic Raisalot. One of Raisal's many sons was Rao Tirmul. He accompanied his father in the Battle of Ahmedabad. Akbar, in recognition of his commendable service, conferred upon him the title of Rao and granted him the parganas of Nagaur and Kasli. His descendants came to be known as Raojika. Rao Rajas of Sikar claim descent from Tirmul. A descendant of Tirmul, Jaswant Singh, was killed by Bahadur Singh, the Raja of Khandela, at Sheogarh Fort in Khandela. To atone for the murder, Bahadur Singh granted Virbhan-ka-Bas to Daulat Singh, the son of the deceased, in 1687. Daulat Singh subsequently renamed it Sikar after Rao Shekha.

== Title and flag ==
=== Title ===
The title of Rao Raja was conferred by Jagat Singh on Lakshman Singh.

=== Flag ===
In 1877, Ram Singh II conferred on Madho Singh the Panchranga, a striped standard of five colors.

== List of rulers ==
=== Rulers ===
Name	Reign Start	Reign End
Daulat Singh	1687	1721
Shiv Singh	1721	1748
Samrath Singh	1748	1754
Nahar Singh	1754	1756
Chand Singh	1756	1763
Devi Singh	1763	1795
Lakshman Singh	1795	1833
Ram Pratap Singh	1833	1850
Bhairon Singh	1851	1886
Madho Singh	1886	1922
Kalyan Singh	28 June 1922	1954

=== Titular rulers ===
Name	Reign Start	Reign End
Kalyan Singh	1954	5 November 1967
Bikram Singh	5 November 1967	

=== Other family members ===
- Himani Shah
