= Madho Singh of Sikar =

Rao Raja of Sikar from 1866 to 1922

Madho Singh
- Rao Raja

Rao Raja of Sikar
- Reign: 1886 – 1922
- Predecessor: Bhairon Singh
- Successor: Kalyan Singh
- Died: 1922
- House: Sikar
- Dynasty: Shekhawat
- Father: Birad Singh (biological); Bhairon Singh (adoptive)

Sir Madho Singh KCIE was the Rao Raja of Sikar from 1886 until his death in 1922.

== Early life ==
He was born as the second son of Birad Singh of Deeppura. Since Bhairon Singh, the Rao Raja of Sikar, had no male heir, he adopted him as his son.

== Succession ==
He became the Rao Raja of Sikar at the age of six in 1866. As he was a minor at the time of his succession, Mukand Singh was appointed regent to administer the affairs of the estate. In 1870, when Richard Bourke, the then Viceroy of India, visited Jaipur and a durbar was held to commemorate his visit, Madho attended the durbar as well. In the durbar, he was presented with a khillat. In 1873, he paid a religious visit to Gaya. Later, when Madho grew weary of Mukand Singh's activities, Mukand resigned, and Madho accepted his resignation. He appointed Elahi Bux as his Chief Minister. He attended the Durbar held in 1875 in Jaipur to commemorate the visit of the Earl of Northbrook, the then Viceroy of India. When Edward VII visited Jaipur as Prince of Wales in February 1876, a durbar was held in Jaipur to commemorate the royal visit, and Madho attended it. He accompanied Ram Singh II, his liege lord, to Delhi and attended the Delhi Durbar of 1877 with him. In 1877, Ram Singh II conferred on him the Panchranga, a striped standard of five colors. In the same year, Ram Singh II conferred upon him the Hath-ka-Siropav. While in Jaipur in 1879, he became aware of Elahi Bux's corruption and mismanagement of state affairs. He consulted Ram Singh II in this regard, and upon his suggestion, sent Elahi Bux to jail. He then appointed Rai Parmanand, his Chief Minister, and Chiman Singh as his assistant. When Pane Singh, the son of his regent Mukund, defied the administration of Sikar, Madho confiscated his jagir. However, he later returned it to him after several years when Pane Singh obliged. While traveling in 1880, he received the news that Ram Singh II was ill. Upon hearing this, he rushed to Jaipur but arrived too late, as the Maharaja had died by then. He then attended the coronation of Madho Singh II. When Madho Singh II abolished the transit duties, he, along with the Raja of Khetri and other Panchpana sardars, raised his voice against this. The Government of India, upon hearing them, directed not to interfere with the long-established usage and rights of these estate holders of the Jaipur State. He was granted the title of Bahadur by Madho Singh II as a personal distinction in 1886. He opened a dispensary at Fatehpur and built Trevor Hospital at Sikar which was opened in 1894. When Madho Singh II visited England in 1902 in connection with the coronation of Edward VII he accompanied him.

During World War I, he contributed approximately 800,000 rupees to various funds and loans. He provided the Indian Army with numerous recruits, as well as horses and camels.

== Death ==
He died in 1922 and was succeeded by Kalyan Singh.

== Honours ==
He was made a member of the St John Ambulance Association in 1915. He received a sword of honor from the Government of India on 7 June 1921. He was appointed Knight Commander of the Order of the Indian Empire by George V in the 1922 New Year Honours.
