= Kalyan Singh of Sikar =

Rao Raja of Sikar from 1922 to 1967

Kalyan Singh
- Rao Raja

Rao Raja of Sikar
- Reign: 28 June 1922 – 5 November 1967
- Predecessor: Madho Singh
- Successor: Bikram Singh
- Born: 20 June 1886
- Died: 5 November 1967 (aged 81)
- House: Sikar
- Dynasty: Shekhawat
- Father: Dalip Singh

Kalyan Singh (28 June 1886 – 5 November 1967) was the Rao Raja of Sikar from 1922 until his death in 1967.

== Early and family ==
He was born on 20 June 1880 at Deeppura to Dalip Singh. He married the daughter of Thakur Madho Singh of Sirana in Ajmer before his succession as Rao Raja of Sikar. He had two sons, Narain Singh, who died in infancy, and Hardayal Singh, who died in 1958 in Jaipur, as well as two daughters. His eldest daughter, Phool Kanwar, married Thakur Umaid Singh of Nimaj, and his youngest daughter married Kunwar Chiman Singh of Chanod. As both of his sons had predeceased him, he adopted Bikram Singh as his son and heir.

== Reign ==
When Madho Singh died in 1922 without leaving an heir to succeed him, the Maharaja of Jaipur selected Kalyan to succeed to the rank, title, and dignity of the deceased. He accordingly succeeded him on 28 June 1922. He was the nephew of his predecessor Madho Singh. He received the title of Bahadur from the Maharaja of Jaipur as a personal distinction on 20 November 1922. He constructed a clock tower, Kalyan Hospital, and a college. The relations between him and Man Singh II became strained over the years due to the latter's excessive interference in the administration of Sikar. The dispute escalated further when Man Singh II insisted on sending Kalyan's only son, Hardayal Singh, to England for higher studies and disagreed with the bride chosen for him. To compel him to give up, Kalyan was continuously summoned to Jaipur, and an unsuccessful attempt was made to arrest him by force at Sikar. In the end, Kalyan assembled a force of armed Rajputs and Qaimkhanis in the fort of Sikar to oppose the forces sent by the Jaipur State. Before a clash between them could occur, A.C. Lothian, Agent to the Governor General in Rajputana, visited Sikar, arranged a settlement, and took Kalyan with him to Ajmer. However, at Ajmer, he was declared a lunatic, thus incapable of managing his own property, and was deposed. Afterward, the superintendence of Sikar was placed under the Court of Wards. It was only after five years that Kalyan was allowed to return to Sikar. On 20 July 1948, he celebrated his Silver Jubilee, the twenty-fifth anniversary of his accession to the throne of Sikar. In 1954, the administration of Sikar was taken over by the Government of India, and in return, he was given compensation.

== Philanthropy ==
He was a man of charitable disposition and had spent a large amount for the welfare of the people of Sikar and on charitable institutions. In 1960, when Shree Kalyan Arogya Sadan (T.B. Sanatorium) was constructed in Sikar, he donated land and some buildings for it.

== Death ==
He died on 5 November 1967 at Sikar and was succeeded by Bikram Singh.
