= Bhairon Singh of Sikar =

Rao Raja of Sikar from 1851 to 1865

Bhairon Singh
- Rao Raja

Rao Raja of Sikar
- Reign: 1851 – 1865
- Predecessor: Ram Pratap Singh
- Successor: Madho Singh
- Born: 1834
- Died: 1865 (aged 30–31)
- Issue: Madho Singh (adoptive)
- House: Sikar
- Dynasty: Shekhawat
- Father: Lakshman Singh
- Mother: Mertaniji

Bhairon Singh was the Rao Raja of Sikar from 1851 until his death in 1865.

== Early life ==
When Lakshman Singh died in 1833, one of his wives, Mertaniji, was pregnant and staying at her parents' house in Ghanerao, where she gave birth to Bhairon in 1834. At that time, Berisal of Samode, who was serving as the chief minister of Jaipur, along with the rest of the minority council, decided that Bhairon be granted the jagir of Seemalala as his patrimony and for maintenance purposes.

== Succession ==
When Ram Pratap Singh died in 1850, he succeeded him as Rao Raja of Sikar. However, his succession was not recognized by the Jaipur authorities, as Bhatianiji, one of the widows of the deceased, announced that she was expecting. Bhairon then appealed to the Jaipur authorities to recognize his succession, and after a year, it was decided in his favor. His claim was also supported by the other chiefs of Shekhawati. He was installed as Rao Raja of Sikar in 1851.

== Reign ==
One of his early acts was to appoint Mukand Singh, one of the illegitimate sons of his father Lakshman Singh, as his chief minister. Another action he took was to try to reach congenial settlements with others, such as inviting the Thakurs of Batote, Patoda, and the rest of the illegitimate sons of Lakshman Singh, and resettling them in Sikar. During the Indian Rebellion of 1857, he rendered loyal services to the British Government. Bhairon Singh helped by sending a force to Colonel Eden, the Political Agent at Jaipur. British Government appreciated his services and conferred upon him a khilat and kharita.

== Personality ==
He was a man of simple habits who maintained good relations with his family members and fellow chiefs. Fateh Singh, the Raja of Khetri, mentioned him in his autobiography in the following words: "... by the strictest economy, and leading a life of abstemiousness and want, he left his treasury full."

== Personal life ==
=== Children ===
He had a biological son who died in childhood. He later adopted Madho Singh, the second son of Birad Singh of Deeppura.

== Death ==
He died in 1865 and was succeeded by Madho Singh.
