= Nahar Singh of Sikar =

Rao of Sikar from 1754 to 1756

Nahar Singh

Rao of Sikar
- Reign: 1754 – 1756
- Predecessor: Samrath Singh
- Successor: Chand Singh
- House: Sikar
- Dynasty: Shekhawat
- Father: Samrath Singh

Nahar Singh was Rao of Sikar (in Rajputana) from 1754 until his death in 1756.

== Biography ==
Upon the death of his father, Samrath Singh, in 1754, he succeeded him as the Rao of Sikar. He was disliked by the people due to his ineffectiveness as a ruler. This allowed his uncles, Chand Singh and Budh Singh, to occupy Sikar in 1756 and depose him as its ruler. Later, Nahar Singh attempted to reclaim Sikar, but he was defeated by his uncles. A compromise was reached between him and his uncle, through which certain estates were granted in perpetuity to him and his brothers, thereby resolving the feud. He himself received Balaran for his maintenance.
