= Battle of Rajamahal =

1747 battle in Jaipur, India

Date	1–2 March 1747
Location	Rajamahal near Tonk, India
Result	Jaipur victory

Belligerents
Kingdom of Jaipur	Kingdom of Mewar; Supporters of Madho Singh; Holkar State; Kingdom of Bundi; Kingdom of Kota

Commanders and leaders
Ishwari Singh; Narayandas	Jagat Singh; Madho Singh; Khanderao Holkar; Ummed Singh of Bundi; Bhupati Ram Charan of Kota (WIA); Durjansal of Kota

The Battle of Rajamahal was a military engagement fought in 1747 in Jaipur, India. The battle was fought between the forces of Sawai Maharaja Ishwari Singh and Maharana Jagat Singh, who wanted to make his nephew Madho Singh the Maharaja of Jaipur or secure a Jagir for him, he built an alliance with the Maratha's under Khanderao Holkar and the Hada clan of Bundi and Kota. The battle resulted in a decisive victory for Ishwari Singh's forces.

== Background ==
During the early 18th century, Maharaja Jai Singh II of Jaipur rose to power in India. A member of the prominent Kachwaha caste, Jai transformed his domain into a powerful geopolitical force within the Mughal Empire. However, his death in 1743 resulted in a succession crisis to break out among the Kachawas. Jai's eldest son, Ishwari Singh, was named as the Maharaja of Jaipur per Kachwaha tradition; however, due to a treaty Jai had signed with his second wife's father-in-law, his youngest son Madho also had a claim to the throne.

Despite having a claim to the throne of Jaipur, Madho Singh initially lacked the support to challenge Ishwari's rule. However, when his brother traveled to Delhi to make his introductions to Emperor Muhammad Shah, Madho revolted with the help of his uncle, Jagat Singh. The two began to gather forces around Jahajpur, where they remained for several weeks. Ishwari was alerted to the rebellion and had quickly returned to Jaipur city. He also paid Maratha soldiers so that they would support him if a battle broke out.

Before a battle could take place, both sides agreed to reach a peaceful settlement. Under the terms of this agreement, Madho was given lands in Tonk and Toda to rule over on the condition that he not rebel against his brother. Representatives from both parties signed the peace accord on 19 December 1744, and so Jagat and Madho began to disband their army. However, Jagat Singh was unwilling (and possibly unable) to pay the Maratha mercenaries he had hired; these Maratha mercenaries attacked Madho Singh and burned their supplies, greatly weakening the pair and forcing Madho and Jagat to retreat to Udaipur. Seeing his brother's weakened position, Ishwari reneged on his earlier agreement and returned to Jaipur city, while Madho began to gather support among the Rajputs for a renewed attempt to overthrow his brother.

== Battle ==
In March 1747, Jagat Singh and Madho Singh (with the help of Marathas under Khande Rao Holkar and the Hadas of Bundi and Kota) invaded Jaipur from the south and advanced to the city of Rajmahal. There they encountered an army under the command of Narayandas, a general of the Jaipur army. Not knowing the size of the invading army, the Jaipur general negotiated with Madho and his commanders. However, he soon uncovered that the invading force was relatively small and learned about friendly reinforcements that were approaching from Udaipur, and so he immediately attacked the invading armies. Fighting began on 1 March and continued through to 2 March. While Maharana commanded the vanguard of invading force, the right charge was led by Holkar and Umed Singh of Bundi, and the left wing being commanded by Bhupati Ram Charan, general of the Kota army. The first confrontation took place between forces of Jaipur and Udaipur, resulting in the latter's forces being routed by the Kachwaha cavalry. The Jaipur forces then fell upon the Maratha and Hadas of Bundi, defeating them. Ishwari Singh, who soon arrived with the reserve forces attacked the left wing of the enemy, the Kota army. Bhupati Charan, the commander of the Kota forces made a strong stand but was wounded and carried away from the field. A successive charge was also led by Prithvi Singh Hada.

Narayandas decisively defeated wave after wave of the invading armies, while Khande Rao made an attempt to attack the Jaipur camp with a swift cavalry charge but was repelled by the Shekhawati guards, however he was able to plunder and gather some loot. The battle finally ended at sunset. Under Narayandas' command, the Jaipur army successfully routed the disorganized invading army.

Ishwari Singh arrived on the battlefield on 3 March to oversee the aftermath of his forces' victory. Madho Singh and his supporters were once again forced to flee Jaipur. Ishwari Singh Invaded Mewar and forced the Maharana to pay tribute, and the Rao of Kota also paid tribute to Jaipur.

== Aftermath ==
The Battle of Rajamahal was a major victory for Ishwari Singh, who was able to consolidate his position as Maharaj of Jaipur. However, Madho, his supporters, and regional rivals of Jaipur would return and launch a second invasion of Jaipur in 1748.
