= Lachhman Singh of Sikar =

Rao Raja of Sikar from 1795 to 1833

Lachhman Singh

Rao Raja of Sikar
- Reign: 1795 – 1833
- Predecessor: Devi Singh
- Successor: Ram Pratap Singh
- Died: 1833
- Issue: Hamir Singh; Ram Pratap Singh; Bhairon Singh
- House: Sikar
- Dynasty: Shekhawat
- Father: Devi Singh (adoptive)
- Mother: Kanlotji

Lachhman Singh (sometimes Laxman Singh or Lakshman Singh) was the Rao Raja of Sikar from 1795 until his death in 1833.

== Early life ==
He was born to the Thakur of Shahpura. Since Devi Singh of Sikar had no male heir, he adopted him as his son and successor.

== Succession ==
After the death of Devi Singh in 1795, he became the Rao Raja of Sikar. His mother, Kanlotji, served as regent, and Dhabhai Surajmal was appointed as a ministerial officer. Jaipur authorities were not in favor of his succession and sent a force under the command of Nandram Haldia to remove him from the throne of Sikar. His mother dispatched a delegation to Nandram imploring him not to act against the son of his deceased friend. In response, Nandram explained that he could not disobey the command of his ruler and suggested they gather a large force to oppose him as he approached the place. It was done, and when Nandram approached Sikar, he found a force of 10,000 ready to oppose him. Nandram then informed the Jaipur authorities that Sikar could not be taken without a great loss of time, men, and money. Therefore, the best course of action would be to accept Sikar's submission. Before he received any response from the Jaipur authorities, Nandram lifted the siege after taking 200,000 Rs. as nazrana for his ruler and a present of 100,000 Rs. for himself.

== Reign ==
When he came of age, he demolished all the castles of his inferior feudatories and did not even spare those of Bilara, Bathoti, Kasli, and his biological family of Shahpura. As a result, his own biological father preferred to live in exile rather than under his rule. He built the Laxmangarh Fort in 1805 and founded the town of Laxmangarh in 1807. He had the fort and city built based on the model of Jaipur. He participated in the battle of Fatehpur in 1799 and the relief of Shahpura. Jagat Singh conferred on him the title of Rao Raja. Over the years, he gained influence at the court at Jaipur and received a khillat from Jagat Singh. He seized 28 villages and the town of Khandela from its Rajas. In 1819, he paid 900,000 rupees to Amir Khan on behalf of Jaipur and received the estate of Khandela as a grant from Jaipur. He held it as an istimrari lease from Jaipur. When Jagat Singh died, his wife, Rani Bhatianiji, became the regent of Jaipur. During her administration, court intrigues became widespread, and he was always found on her side. In 1822, Rani Bhatianiji persuaded him to give up Khandela, which was restored to its rightful claimants in 1835. As compensation for building a fort at Khandela, he was granted 12 villages.

== Personal life ==
He had seven wives. Besides them, he had eight paswans (mistresses). He had three legitimate sons: Hamir Singh, Ram Pratap Singh, and Bhairon Singh.

== Death ==
He died in 1833 and was succeeded by his son Ram Pratap Singh.
