= Shri Amrit Nath Ashram =

Religious site in India

Coordinates: 28.0123°N 74.9688°E

Shri Amrit Nath Ashram is an ashram of the Nath Sampradaya of Manna Nathi Panth founded by Shri Amritnathji Maharaj in Fatehpur, Shekhawati, Sikar district of Rajasthan, India.

== Ashram ==
Shri Amrit Nath Ashram is a sacred space for chanting and meditative saints. The saints and devotees who come there have realizations of spiritual, emotional and mental peace. Spearheading the Guru Gorakhnath clan, this ashram belonging to the Mannaathi sect or panth has given knowledgeable saints to society. These saints have governed this Ashram and also Ashrams outside of the Mannaathi sect or panth through which constant social welfare work has been done.

According to the scriptures and mythology, Lord Shiva had manifested as Guru Gorakhnath to make Yoga popular. And by becoming a teacher of yoga and through his knowledge of nutrition and diet, Guru Gorakhnath worked for the welfare of humanity and it is believed that the founder of this ashram Sri AmritNathji Maharaj is one of the form Guru Gorakhnath of by the people, this is what his devotees and followers believe. Sri Amrit Nathji Maharaj lived in the forest for 24 years as he developed the science of yoga and naturopathy by experimenting on his own body.

Alongside is the Dhuna of Shri AmritNathji. This is the place where Shri AmritNathji remained absorbed with penances. The fire burns constantly in the Dhuna. In front of the Samadhi is the newly built hall with pictures of the life of Baba Shri AmritNathji - Shri Amrit Lila. The beautiful mirror work on the ceiling attracts attention. Morning and evening "Aartis" are held in this hall and people use this place for meditation. The atmosphere here is serene, having a calming effect on the mind. The Ashram is spread over a vast area and is surrounded by greeneries and beautiful nature.

== Samadhi ==
The four Samadhi of the divine Gurus that have been the Mahant Shri shri Amrit Nathji maharaj, Shri Jyoti Nathji, Shri Subh Nathji and Shri Hanuman Nathji in shining white marble enhances with beautiful work done on that matching the beauty of the place.

== Agriculture ==
It has agricultural land and most of the food grain and vegetables are grown for the consumption of its inhabitants and visitors. The ashram tries to be self-sufficient. The food grains like wheat, millet (bajra), gram (chana) and vegetables are grown here organically.

The ashram has its own cows. The yogurt prepared from this milk along with bread prepared from bajra is the favorites breakfast for most of the visitors. It is about 320 km from Delhi and 150 km from Jaipur by road. The ashram today has more than 100 rooms with all modern amenities.
