= Shekhawati painting =

Style of wall-painting in the region of Shekhawati in Rajasthan, India

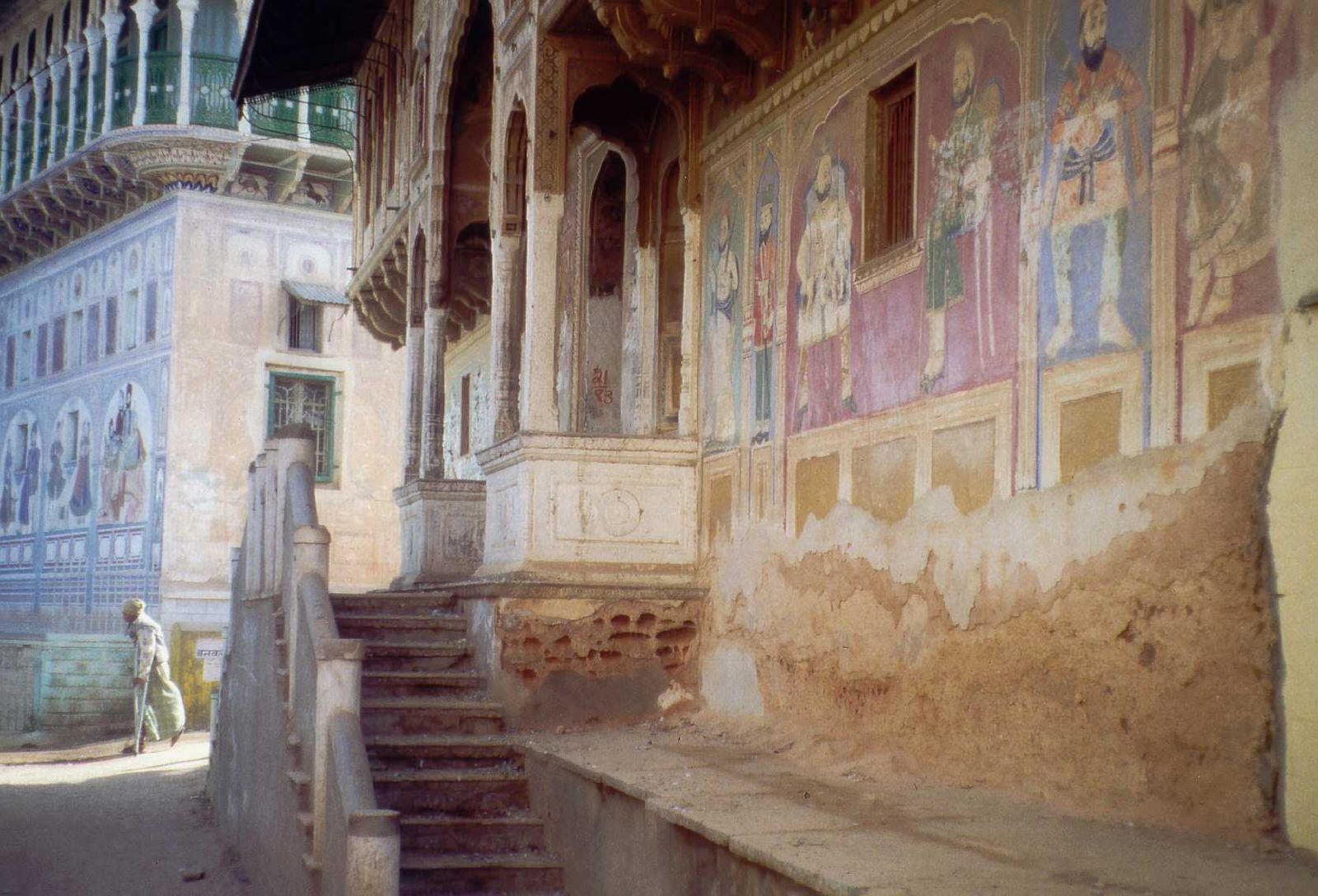
Painted houses

The region of Shekhawati in Rajasthan is remarkable for its wealth of mural paintings which adorn the walls of many buildings, including havelis.

== History ==
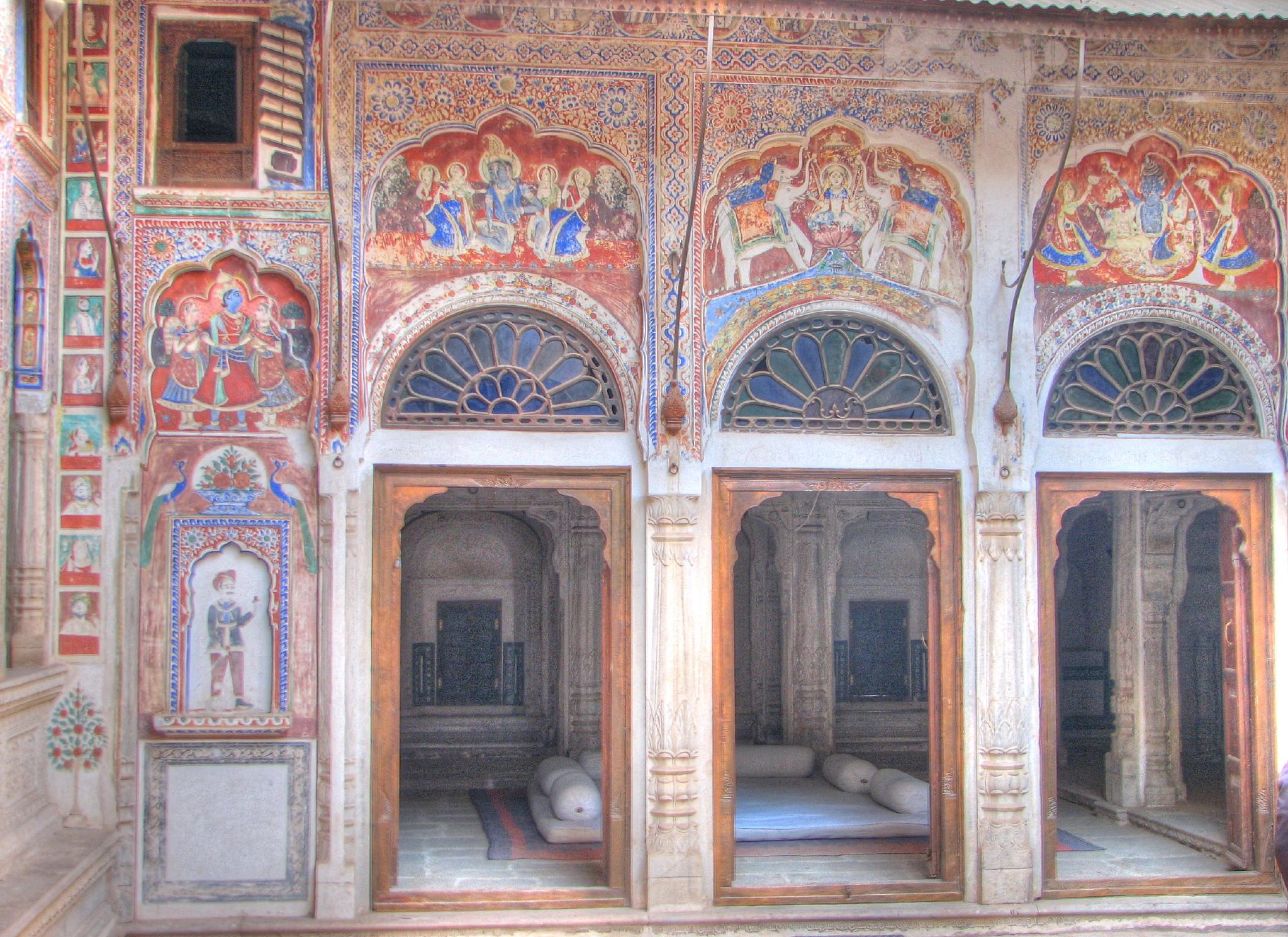
Courtyard

=== Shekhawati region ===
Shekhawati describes a district, or nizamat, of the pre-Independence kingdom of Dhundar or Jaipur. This region was ruled by descendants of the 15th century Rajput baron, Rao Shekha, who were known as Shekhawats. It is covered by the two modern districts of Jhunjhunu and Sikar. Churu district lay in the neighbouring kingdom of Bikaner, but its nearest towns to the north and west, although never part of Shekhawati, contain similar painted buildings.

=== 17th century ===
Traces of wall paintings are found on Shekhawati structures erected by Muslim nawabs, Rajputs and Banias dating back to the 17th century. A local style was influenced by 16th/17th century Mughal work in Agra and Fatehpur Sikri via painted monuments in Amer. The earliest dated Shekhawati work includes the ‘Jaipur fresco’ work, which was employed before Jaipur’s foundation by craftsmen employed by Mughal rulers and in Amer. This involves thick layers of pigment being applied and worked onto a wet plaster surface. The pigment is often incised scraperboard-like with geometric and floral designs. The interior work is usually painted secco, using tempera, onto dry plaster.

In the few surviving 17th-century painted buildings, some popular Jahangir period (1605–27) subjects such as winged-head cherubs (from Baroque Europe via Goa), hatted Persian angels, the pheasant-like simurgh, cypress trees, lotus bud decoration and the Sufi tale of the lovers Laila and Majnu may be integrated with popular Hindu religious and folk themes. Early 18th century structures in Udaipurwati, Jhunjhunu district, such as Jokhi Das ki Chhatri, dated 1702, and the c1700 Chaturbhuj Temple at Nathusar, Sikar district, even include portraits of the emperor Aurangzeb (1658-1707). Most of these early murals are painted in red, yellow and green ochres but green copper carbonate and both white and red lead also feature in the palette.

=== 18th century ===
In the 18th century, under the patronage of Rajput rulers and Vaishya merchants, a number of temples and chhatris were richly decorated with figurative paintings. Some forts also contained painted rooms. Again, ochres formed the general palette and the figures were largely drawn from the Hindu pantheon. Amongst other subjects chosen are stylised portraits, hunting scenes, folk tales and historic battles, particularly the Battle of Maonda 1767, in temples, or in chhatris which commemorated those who fought or died. Good examples are in small c1700 temples east of Sri Madhopur at Bagriawas, Nathusar and Lisaria, both Sikar district, in the chhatri (1750) and temple (1742) at Parasrampura, Jhunjhunu district, the 8-pillar chhatri (1776) in Churu and, perhaps by the same hand, the Bihari Temple in Jhunjhunu (1777). Such painting continued into the 19th century in forts, like those at Mandawa, Nawalgarh and Mahansar, all in Jhunjhunu district, as well as temples and chhatris, often using a richer palette.

Apart from a few temples and chhatris, merchant monuments predating an 1818 treaty between Jaipur and the new British regime were lightly painted externally with floral motifs and arabesques.

=== 19th and early 20th centuries ===
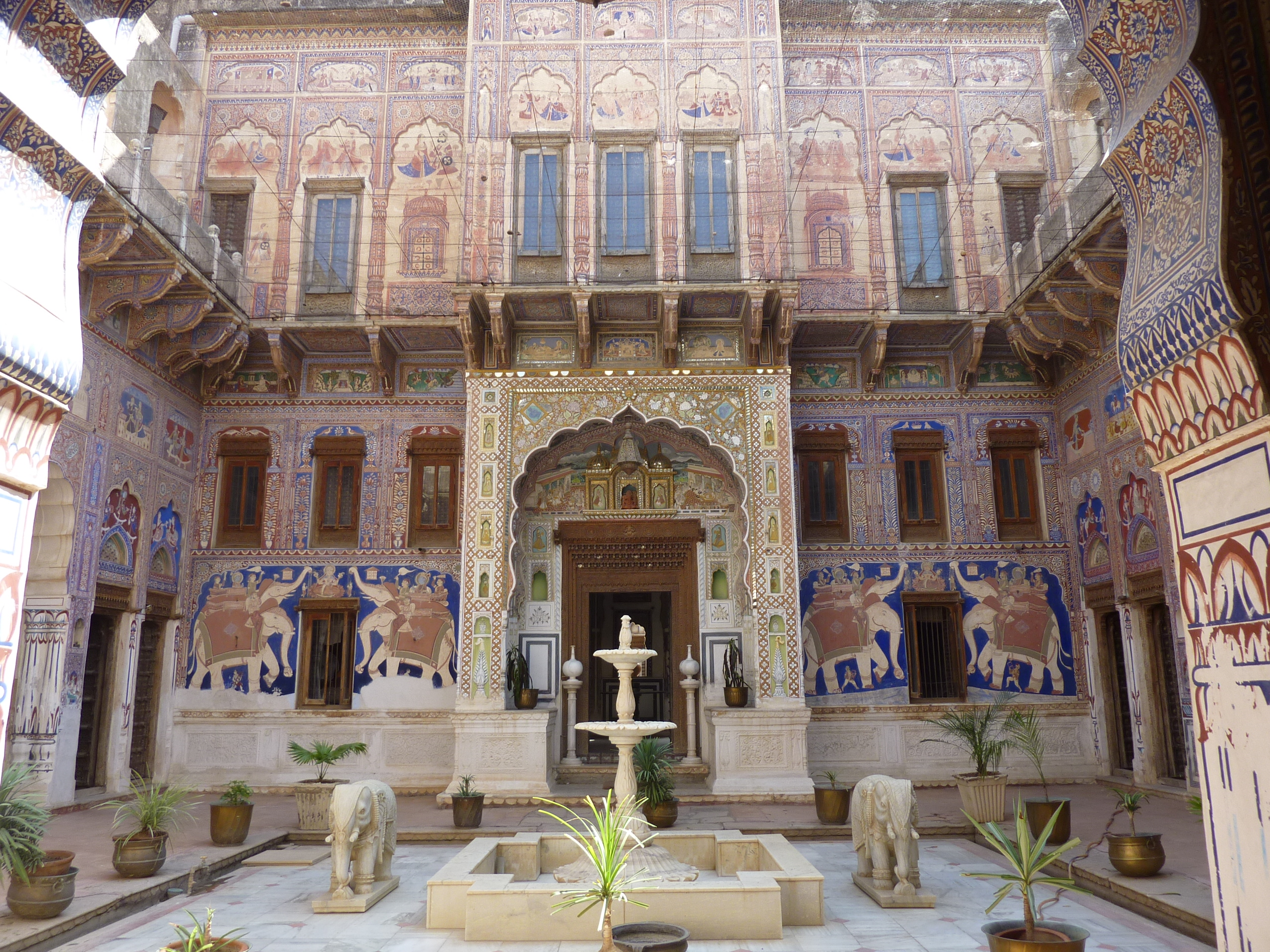
Courtyard of 19th century Nadine Le Prince Haveli

The great merchant era of patronage began around 1830 when Shekhawati merchants, settled in Calcutta and elsewhere, began to pour money back to their hometowns, much of which was turned to conspicuous building. By then, under British protection, they were no longer shy of drawing attention to their wealth. The most obvious blossoming of wall-paintings in Shekhawati is on late 19th and early 20th-century havelis. They aimed to construct five buildings: a haveli, a temple, a memorial chhatri, a well and a caravansarai. Most were painted. The havelis offer the most variable subject matter, but temples, memorial chhatris and cupolas decorating wells are often richly decorated.

== Painters and their methods ==
=== Painters ===
The building boom attracted many Muslim chejaras, masons, and Hindu kumhars, members of the potter caste who became masons, to Shekhawati. The painters were mostly gifted, self-taught men drawn from amongst them. For the finest work, teams of professional painters were called in from the Jaipur direction. Where painters have signed, they are from Jaipur or its vicinity. Masons whose ancestors painted often talk of their family migrating from the southeast.

=== Techniques ===
The walls themselves are the richest source of information on techniques and scientific studies confirm their account. Half-finished work is always informative. Murals on the unfinished ceiling of Gopinath Temple, Parasrampura (1742) show that the pictures, though continuous, were drawn and coloured piecemeal on the dry plaster surface. Lines in charcoal and red ochre were corrected. Outlines of groups of figures were drawn, then corrected and reach their final form when the artist paints them in, colour by colour. There is no trace of drawing away from the tracts of plaster the painter was decorating. Most was done freehand, but on other buildings there are clear signs of dotted stencilled outlines; arcs and straight lines were aided by string. Townscapes were constructed with a straight-edge. Unfinished examples depicting Jaipur survive in a Nawalgarh chhatri and in Khetri’s Bakhtawar Mahal. The pigments were mixed with an adhesive, often gum from the common plant, akra but also egg or saresh, gum made from camel bone. ‘Jaipur Fresco’ work on the outer walls of havelis shows construction lines created by a taut string covered with ochre or charcoal dust flicked against the wet plaster, leaving an imprint and colour. Rapid freehand sketches with a sharp stylus, often corrected, have left their mark in the plaster surface. The paint was applied in blocks of thick pigment massaged against the wet lime surface to be partially integrated with calcium carbonate as it forms. The surface was burnished with agate and polished with coconut flesh. Some fine details such as jewellery were added in tempera and stand proud of the surface.

=== Pigments ===
Until the mid 19th century the paints were mineral or vegetable pigments. Ochres dominated but in finer interior work red and white lead, cinnabar, indigo, lapis lazuli, copper carbonate, vivid Indian yellow. The lead pigments were prone to oxidisation, blackening. From the mid 19th century, Germany’s industrial revolution created chemically synthesised pigments which were soon cheaply available. Ultramarine blue (from artificial lapis) and chrome red dominated external paintings after 1860. By the close of the 19th century many more colours were available, sometimes in jarring combinations.

== Subjects ==
=== Religious themes ===
These dominate all the pictures. Most relate to the ten or twenty-four most common incarnations of Vishnu. Of these Rama and Krishna are by far the most popular. Shaivite subjects, particularly Shiva, Ganesh and Durga are commonplace. Ganesh presides over every doorway. Brahma occurs but his consort, Saraswati, is more frequent. Local deities such as Gugaji, Ramdevji and Pabuji appear infrequently.

=== Folk mythology ===
Folk tales are generally depicted by a single image, the most striking event in the story. In Dhola-Maru, the popular Rajasthani story, Dhola and his wife Maru are shown on a camel fleeing from the wicked bandit, Umra-Sumra. Maru turns to let fly a stream of arrows at him. Punjabi tales such as Heer-Ranjha, Sohni-Mehwal, Sassi-Punu and Binjo-Sorath all feature but the Middle Eastern Sufi tale, Laila-Majnu, is one of the earliest to be depicted. Many other less familiar stories appear, the significance of some now forgotten.

=== Historical themes ===
Recognisable, or labelled, portraits of historical figures, both Indian and British, feature. These range from Mughal rulers and heroes who opposed them, local princes, British monarchs down to Freedom Fighters including Gandhi. Historical events occur, too, one being the Battle of Maonda, 1767. European figures are often used to accompany technical innovations including pumps, cars, ships, planes and bicycles.

=== Everyday environment ===
The painters often draw from their surroundings, depicting farmers at work, folk drawing water from a well, potters, goldsmiths, swordsmiths, carpenters and, occasionally, masons building and painting walls. Domestic and wild animals, birds and plants are commonly depicted.

=== Erotica ===
Pictures of couples making love are usually cheekily hidden amongst murals on external walls. Sometimes there are depictions of bestiality; men with donkeys or dogs, women with dogs. Homosexuality is very rarely depicted; self-conscious householders sometimes obliterate erotic paintings.

=== Map pictures ===
Occasionally a team of painters has been commissioned to paint Jaipur or the local town. An excellent example is in the palace sheesh mahal at Sikar, where the walled town, complete with people and traffic, is neatly depicted as it was in 1864. The most accessible is in a bastion of the main fort in Nawalgarh, where both Jaipur and Nawalgarh were painted c1850 on the domed ceiling. Other pictures show recognisable local or distant buildings, the Taj Mahal being popular.

=== Decorative designs ===
Stylised plants or plant-like arabesques, architectural features and geometric patterns are common, chosen for subjects in panels, friezes dividing walls or in spandrels of arches.

== Decline and destruction ==
Towards the mid 20th century successful merchants committed themselves to a new urban existence, rarely visiting the homeland save for ritual or charity purposes. Investing in industry, some of these families have become amongst the richest in India. Rented out, locked or neglected, havelis and chhatris are suffering. Wells have been superseded by hand-pumps then by tapped water. Buildings collapse, are whitewashed or are demolished to make way for some new structure. Old paintings are replaced by inferior new work. There is currently no legislation to protect such buildings. Interest inspired by the publication of Wacziarg and Nath's book on the paintings in 1982 led to INTACH commissioning a documentation of the buildings; many of those surveyed in 1985-87 have since disappeared. Attempts are being made by some groups, such as the Morarka family of Nawalgarh, to create an interest in preserving some of the buildings.

In recent years, the Government has undertaken some efforts towards spreading awareness about this unique art heritage. Both the Jawahar Kala Kendra in Jaipur and the National Crafts Museum in Delhi have specially commissioned works of Shekhawati frescoes on their walls. Sustainable heritage tourism is being seen as one way of both ensuring the protection and conservation of this art. The hoteliers and heritage conservationists Francis Wacziarg and Aman Nath's Rajasthan: The Painted Walls of Shekhavati and Ilay Cooper's The Painted Towns of Shekhawati are important works on these murals.

In 2012, the Department of Posts issued a stamp commemorating the Shekhawati paintings.

== See also ==
- Rajput painting
- Ramgarh Shekhawati
