= Prithvi Singh II =

Maharaja of Jaipur from 1768 to 1778

Sawai Prithvi Singh II
- Maharaja Sawai of Amber
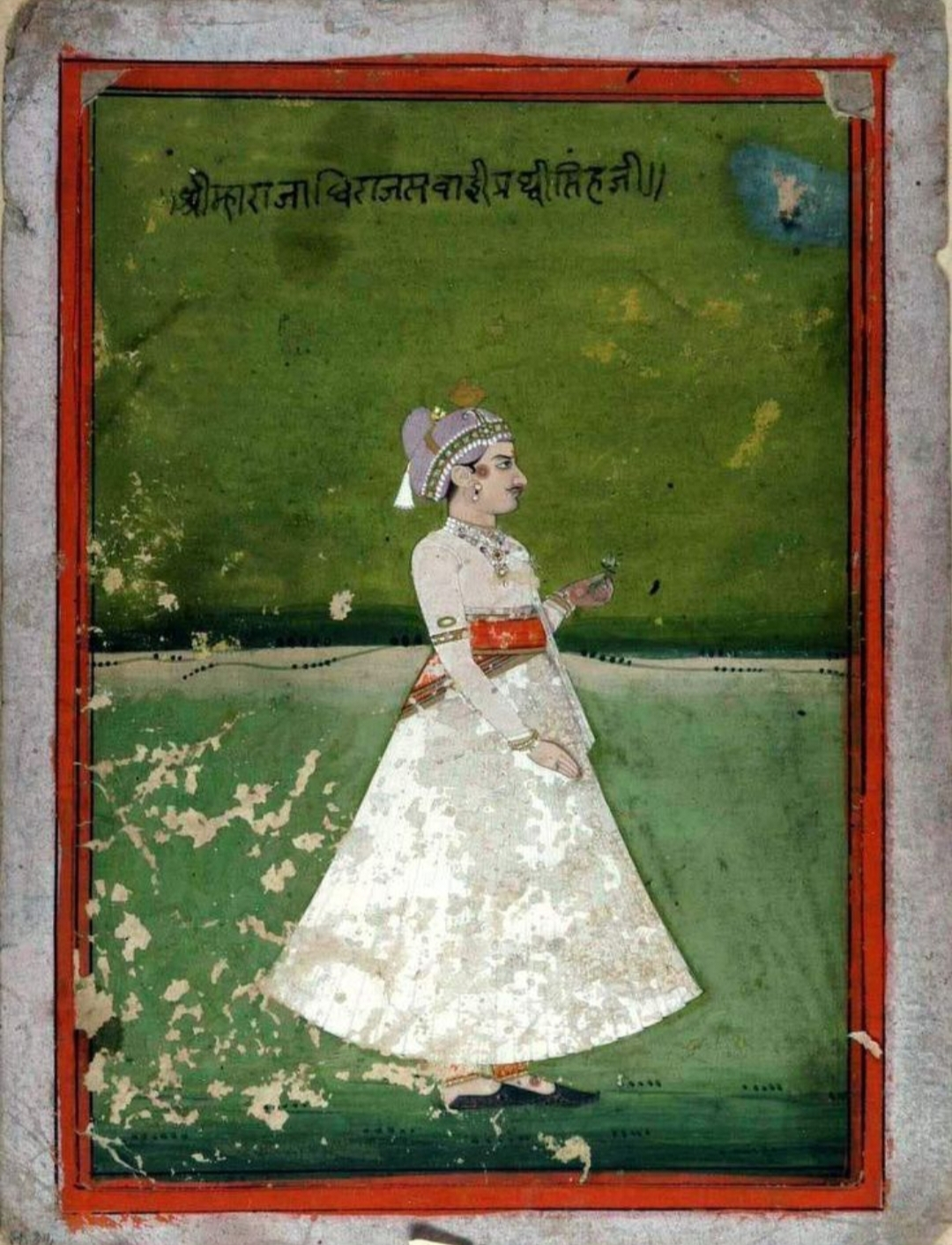
- Mid 19th century imaginary portrait

4th Raja of Jaipur
- Reign: 5 March 1768 – 13 April 1778
- Predecessor: Madho Singh I
- Successor: Pratap Singh
- Born: 9 January 1762; Jaipur Rajputana, Kingdom of Jaipur
- Died: 13 April 1778 (aged 16)
- Spouse: Rathorji (Bikawatji) Sardar Kanwarji d.of Maharaja Raj Singh of Bikaner Rathorji (Udaibhanotji) Abhai Kanwarji d.of Raja Akhai Singh of Bandanwara in Ajmer Rathorji (Kishansinghot) d.of Maharaja Birad Singh of Kishangarh
- Issue: 2 sons including Kunwar Man Singh (born posthumously)
- House: Kachhwaha
- Father: Madho Singh I
- Mother: Sisodiniji (Chundawatji) Kundan Kanwarji d.of Rawat Jaswant Singh of Devgarh in Mewar
- Religion: Hinduism

Sawai Prithvi Singh II (9 January 1762 – 13 April 1778), also known as Prithviraj Singh II, was the Kachwaha ruler of the Kingdom of Jaipur from 5 March 1768 until his death on 13 April 1778. He was the eldest surviving son of his father Sawai Madho Singh I and grandson of Sawai Jai Singh II.

== Biography ==
Maharaja Sawai Prithvi Singh II was six years old when he ascended the throne of the Kachwaha Kingdom of Jaipur in the year 1768 after his father's death. Being elder, Prithvi Singh succeeded his father on the throne and his mother queen Chundawatji became the regent. One of his nobles, Raja Pratap Singh of the Naruka Kachwahabranch of nobility separated himself from the State of Jaipur and established an independent kingdom at Machheri near Alwar and laid the foundation in 1770 which remained an independent ruling territory and later came to known as Alwar State. That is how Alwar became a separate state independent of Jaipur. Sawai Prithvi Singh II ruled for 10 years and died of a fall from his horse in 1778 at the age of 16, leaving behind one widow his third queen the Kishangarh princess who being pregnant was sent to his father's protection giving birth to her late husband's only son Man Singh the undisputed heir to the throne of Jaipur.
