= Battle of Bagru =

1748 battle

Date	20–26 August 1748
Location	Bagru near Jaipur, India
Result	Madho Singh and allied victory: Ishvari Singh sign peace with Marathas; Ishvari Singh agree to pay tribute to Marathas and Gives back Bundi to Ummeed Singh; Marathas allow him to rule Jaipur gaining political victory over Madho Singh

Belligerents
Kingdom of Jaipur; Reinforced By; Kingdom of Bharatpur	Forces of Madho Singh; Reinforced By; Holkar Clan; Kingdom of Bundi

Commanders and leaders
Ishwari Singh; Suraj Mal	Madho Singh; Malhar Rao Holkar; Gangadhar Tatya; Ummed Singh of Bundi

The Battle of Bagru was a military engagement fought between multiple Indian kingdoms in 1748 near the town of Bagru, Jaipur, India. The battle was fought during a succession crisis following the death of Jai Singh II, which left Jaipur without effective leadership. In the battle, Madho Singh defeated ishwari Singh in a 6-day engagement with help of Marathas and Kingdom of Bundi.

== Background ==
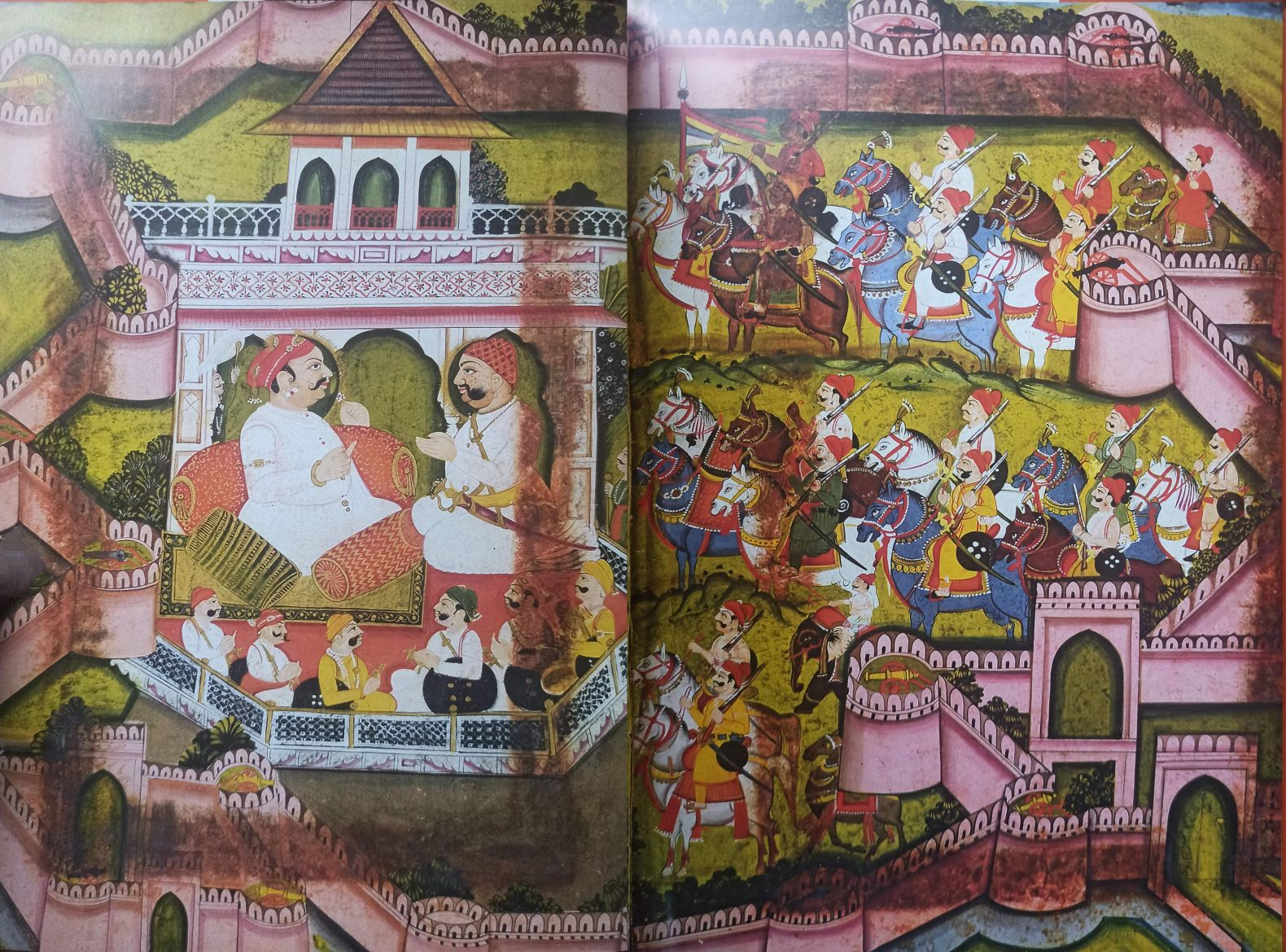
Painting of Suraj Mal of Bharatpur State meeting with his liege Ishwari Singh of Jaipur State before the Battle of Bagru, from an illustrated 'Sujan Charitra' series, by Ramji, circa mid-to-late 18th century

Jai Singh II, Maharajah of Jaipur and head of the powerful Kachhwaha caste, was a major geopolitical force in his lifetime. As a prominent figure within the Mughal Empire, Jai allied himself with several other powerful rajas; he was particularly close to Suraj Mal, Maharajah of Bharatpur, who considered Jai Singh to be like a father. When Jai Singh died on 21 September 1743, his 25-year-old son Ishwari Singh replaced him as Maharajah. However, Madho Singh, another of Jai Singh's sons from a different marriage, disagreed with his brother's accession to the throne and subsequent ruling of Jaipur; in 1747, he rose in revolt against his brother. Madho Singh's revolt was defeated at the Battle of Rajamahal, but the claimant escaped and began to gather forces to assist him in ousting his brother.

Just over a year after his first invasion had failed, Madho Singh again invaded Jaipur. Unlike his previous invasion, Malhar Rao personally led the complete might of his army during his second invasion. He also built up a strong alliance of powers who opposed his brother; Malhar Rao, a rival to the late Jai Singh, joined Madho Singh's efforts to overthrow his brother, feeling he could benefit from Jaipur's weakness. Ummed Singh, the vanquished Raja of Bundi also joined, as he was eager to win back his kingdom. Madho Singh's army also contained a large host of Maratha, Afghan and tribal mercenaries, soldiers from the Maratha Holkar clan, Hada Rajputs from Bundi and several Kachhwaha nobles who defected. This alliance marched against Jaipur in August 1748. Malhar Rao took the lead and captured several strategic Forts and towns of the Jaipur Kingdom.

In Jaipur city, Ishwari Singh amassed his forces for battle; Ishwari Singh, unlike his father and brother, initially had no allies and was badly outnumbered by Madho Singh's coalition. In desperation, Ishwari asked Suraj Mal - a longtime ally of his late father - for aid, and Surajmal readily accepted, personally leading his army of 10,000 men to Jaipur city. Though still heavily outnumbered, the two defenders hoped to attack Madho Singh's army before all of his forces had consolidated.

== Battle ==
According to contemporary source Peshwa Daftar, the two armies engaged each-other around the town of Bagru on 20 August 1748. The fighting lasted for 6 days; for much of the battle, a rainstorm blanketed the area. The first day resulted in heavy losses for both armies before the rain halted the fighting. On the second day, Suraj personally led his forces in a fierce counterattack that routed the Maratha contingent of Modho's army; however, the Marathas were able to spike many Jaipur cannons before they were forced back. While the two armies fought at Bagru, 5000 men from Malhar's army captured a Jaipur supply convoy and blocked the road between Bagru and Jaipur city. With their supplies and line of retreat cut off, Ishwari and Suraj retreated into Bagru's fort, ending the maratha cut the noses and hands of 6000 people.

Having lost the battle, Ishwari chose to sue for peace. Rather than negotiate with the enemy army as a whole, he offered terms to each individual commander. He bribed an ally of the Holkars to arrange for the Holkar forces to withdraw, and agreed to give his brother control over five parganas. He bribed the Maratha soldiers (and allowed them to keep the wealth they had looted), and agreed to surrender the town of Bundi to Ummed Singh. In return for his concessions, Ishwari was allowed to return to Jaipur city and continue his rule.

== Aftermath ==
While Suraj Mal's actions during the battle at Bagru won him praise for his martial skill, the defeat humiliated Ishwari. The Jaipur raj descended into a state of paranoia, resulting in him arresting and executing a number of his officials. He attempted to regain his lost prestige by helping the nearby Kingdom of Marwar against the invading Mughal army, he won a minor victory at the Battle of Raona against the Mughal general Salabat Khan, but was soon bogged down in a stalemate and forced to withdraw. He also failed to pay Holkar his dues from his defeat at Bagru. When he failed to repay these debts, Holkar invaded Jaipur with a large army. Ishwari Singh locked himself in his room for many days and refused to come out. The ministers of Jaipur urged Ishwari Singh to give them orders, but faced with his enemies approaching his capital, Ishwari committed suicide on 12 December 1750, resulting in Madho Singh becoming the Maharajah of Jaipur.
