= Pratap Singh of Jaipur =

Maharaja of Jaipur from 1778–1803

Sawai Pratap Singh
- Maharaja Sawai of Amber
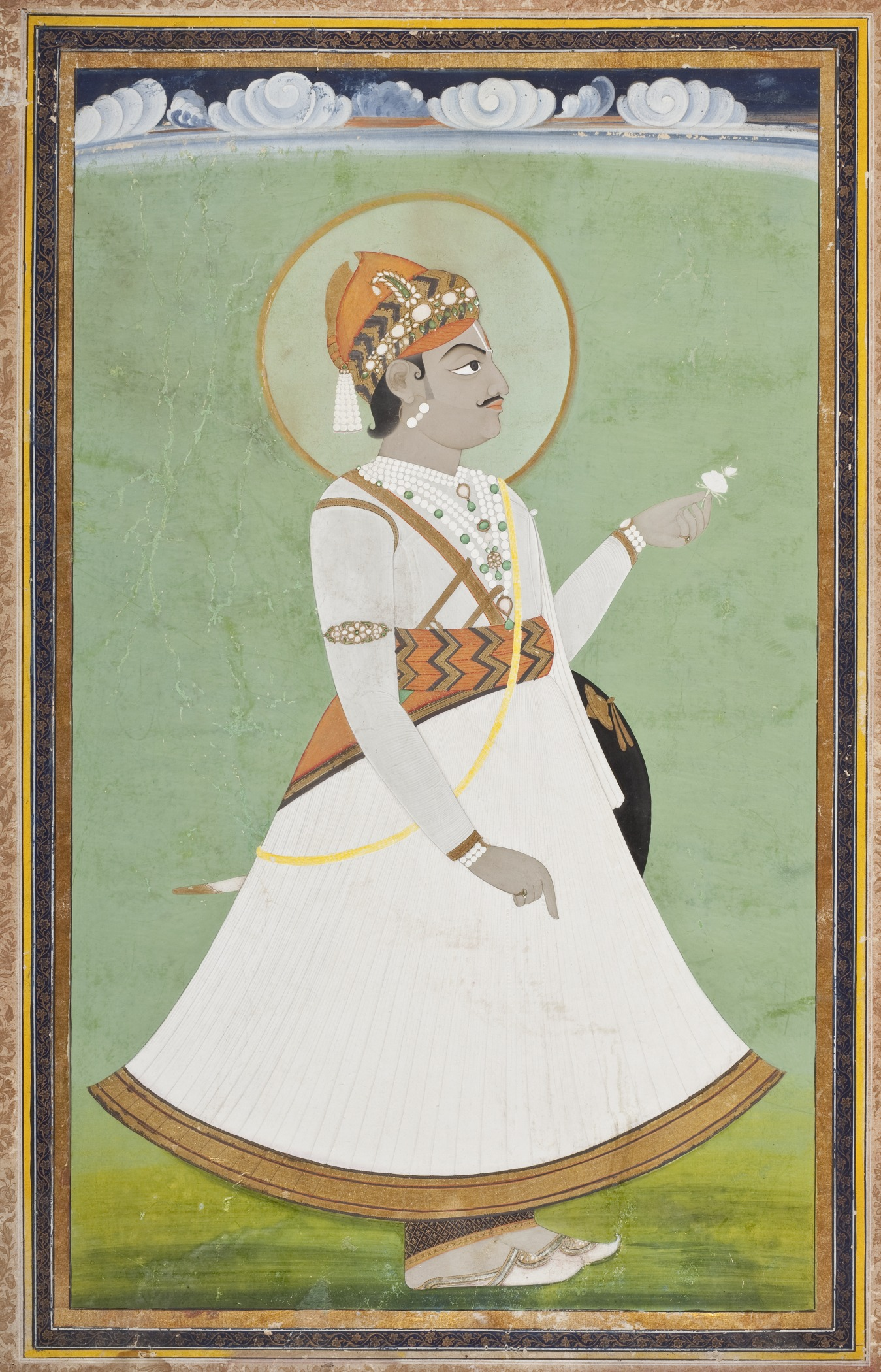

5th Raja of Jaipur
- Reign: 13 April 1778 – 1 August 1803
- Predecessor: Prithvi Singh II
- Successor: Jagat Singh II
- Born: 2 December 1764; Jaipur, Jaipur Kingdom
- Died: 1 August 1803 (aged 38); Jaipur, Jaipur Kingdom
- Spouse: Rathorji Gulab Kanwarji from Ratlam Jadonji Indra Kanwarji of Karauli Sisodiniji Chatra Kanwarji of Bagore in Mewar Tanwarji Nawal Kanwarji of Patan in Jaipur Bhatiyaniji Fateh Kanwarji of Jaisalmer Chandrawatji of Sheopur in Jaipur Chandrawatji of Sankotra in Jaipur Gaurji Lal Kanwarji of Sheopur in Malwa Jhaliji Taj Kanwarji of Dhrangadhra in Gujarat Hadiji Vichitra Kanwarji of Bundi Khichanji Mohan Kanwarji of Raghogarh-Vijaypur in Malwa Rathorji Abhai Kanwarji of Jodhpur-Marwar
- Issue: Jagat Singh Chand Kanwarji (died young) Anand Kanwarji m.to Maharaja Bhim Singh of Marwar Suraj Kanwarji m.to Maharaja Man Singh of Marwar
- House: Kachhwaha
- Father: Madho Singh I
- Mother: Chundawatji Kundan Kanwarji d.of Rawat Jaswant Singh of Devgarh in Mewar

Sawai Pratap Singh (2 December 1764 – 1 August 1803) was the Kachwaha ruler of the Kingdom of Jaipur. He was brought on the throne by his mother Maji Chundawatji after the suspicious death of his elder full brother Sawai Prithvi Singh II in 1778. He is known for constructing the magnificent Hawa Mahal in Jaipur in the year 1799.

== Biography ==
Sawai Pratap Singh was born as a younger son of Sawai Madho Singh I on 2 December 1764. Pratap Singh became the Maharaja at the age of 14 after the death of his elder full brother Sawai Prithvi Singh II. He ruled from the year 1778 to 1803. His 25-year rule witnessed many spectacular achievements and strategic failures. Being constantly goaded by the Marathas and the Mughals, he had to face repeated threats and a heavy drainage of funds by the former. He also made his raj guru Pandit Shiv Narayan Misr the king of Jaipur for 3 days, when he was busy performing religious rituals. Due to court politics, Pandit Shiv Narayan Mishr was later forced to commit suicide.

The fountains behind the Govind Dev temple are credited to him, his poetic talent and patronage of arts and crafts. During his time, the art of paintings reached its peak. By the time of his ascension to the throne, the Mughal Empire was almost in shambles and the artists were fleeing the once imperial capital of Empire i.e Delhi. Maharaja Sawai Pratap Singh gave them patronage and they came and settled in Jaipur. It was these artists who brought recognition to the Jaipur school of painting.

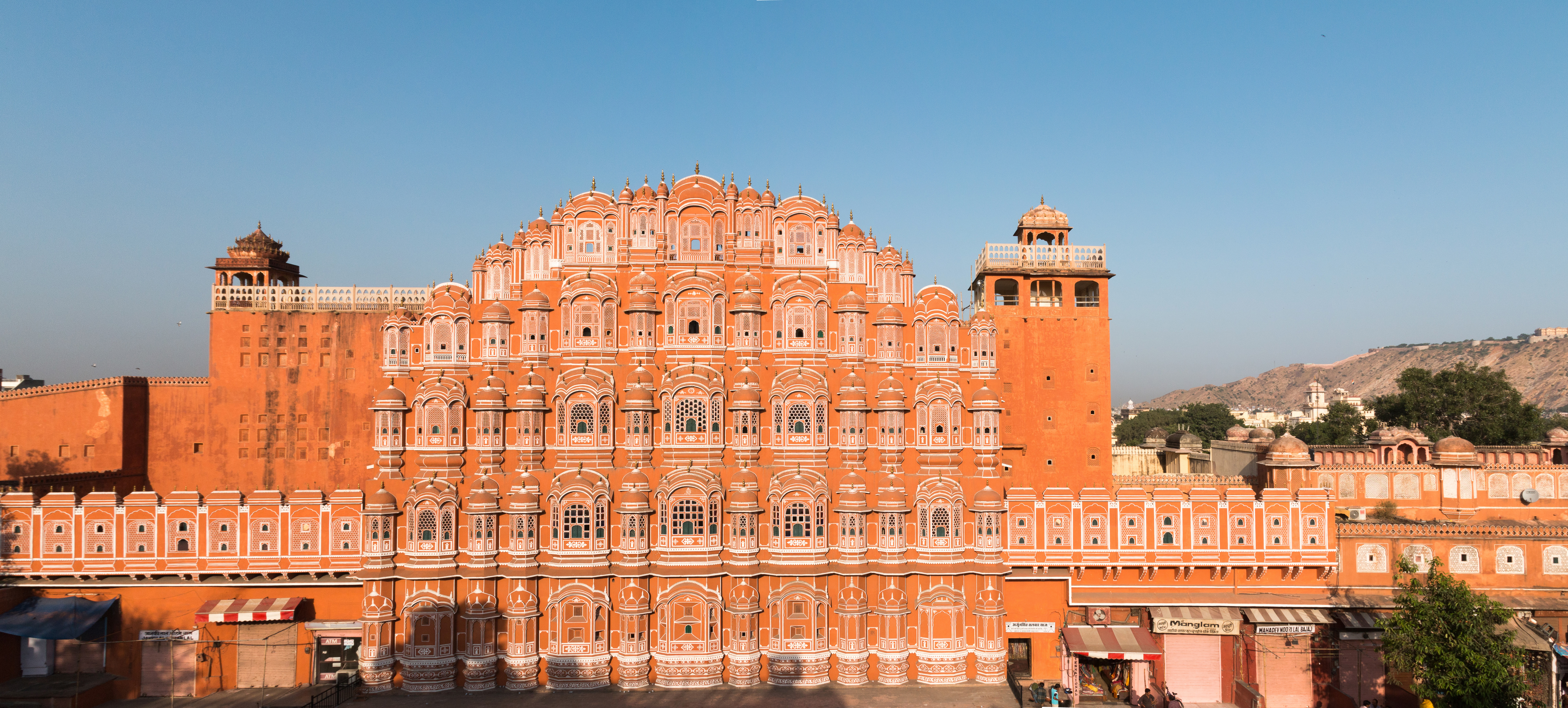
The Hawa Mahal was constructed by Pratap Singh.

The finest example of his connoisseurship is the unique architectural marvel Hawa Mahal (the palace of the Winds) and few rooms of the City Palace, which he got constructed. A large number of scholarly works were produced during his time. He himself was a good poet and wrote poems in Braj Bhasha and Dhundari language under the pen name of Brijnidhi.

== See also ==
- House of Kachwaha
- Hawa Mahal
