= Harsh, Sikar =

Harsh
- mountain
- Location in Rajasthan, India Harsh (India)
- Coordinates: 27.52°N 75.18°E
- Country: India
- State: Rajasthan
- District: Sikar
- Elevation: 944.88 m (3,100.0 ft)

Population (2001)
  - Total: 608,616

Languages
  - Official: Hindi
- Time zone: UTC+5:30 (IST)
- ISO 3166 code: RJ-IN

Harsh is a village in Sikar tehsil in Sikar district in Rajasthan, India. It is a place of religious importance. Harshnath is an old Hindu temple situated in Harsh Village. In 2001, the population of the village was 6016, out of which 772 are Scheduled Caste and 58 are Scheduled Tribe people. It is at latitude 27.52, longitude 75.18 and 554 meters in altitude. The place is known for Harasnath temple at Mt. Harsha (c. mid-10th century). It is known for an inscription created in 961 AD.
