= Ishwari Singh of Jaipur =

Raja of Jaipur from 1743 to 1750

Sawai Ishwari Singh
- Maharaja Sawai
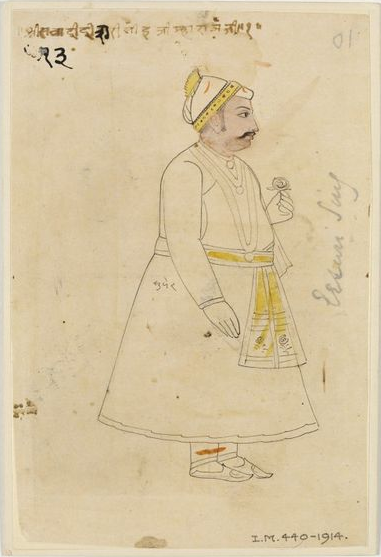
- 19th century portrait of Ishwari Singh

2nd Raja of Jaipur
- Reign: 21 September 1743 – 12 December 1750
- Predecessor: Jai Singh II
- Successor: Madho Singh I
- Born: February 1721; Jaisinghpura, Delhi, Delhi Subah, Mughal Empire
- Died: 12 December 1750 (aged 29); Jaipur, Jaipur Kingdom, Rajputana
- Spouse: Sisodiniji Ajab Kanwarji of Banera in Mewar; Rathorji (Bikawatji) Man Kanwarji of Kalori in Bikaner; Hadiji (Chauhanji) of Kota; Rathoreji from Bandanwara in Ajmer; Virpuriji (Solankiniji) of Lunawada; Jadonji of Ramathra in Karauli
- Issue: Kalkiprasad (died infant); Ari Singh (died infant); Deep Kanwarji (m.to Maharaja Ram Singh of Jodhpur-Marwar)
- House: Kachhwaha
- Father: Jai Singh II
- Mother: Khichanji (Chauhanji) Sukh Kanwarji d.of Raja Dhiraj Singh of Raghogarh-Vijaypur in Malwa
- Religion: Hinduism

Sawai Ishwari Singh (February 1721 – 12 December 1750) was the Kachwaha ruler of Jaipur Kingdom (in Rajputana) reigning for the seven turbulent and highly unstable political years from 1743 to 1750. He was the second son of Sawai Jai Singh II and elder half brother of his immediate successor Sawai Madho Singh I.

== Reign ==
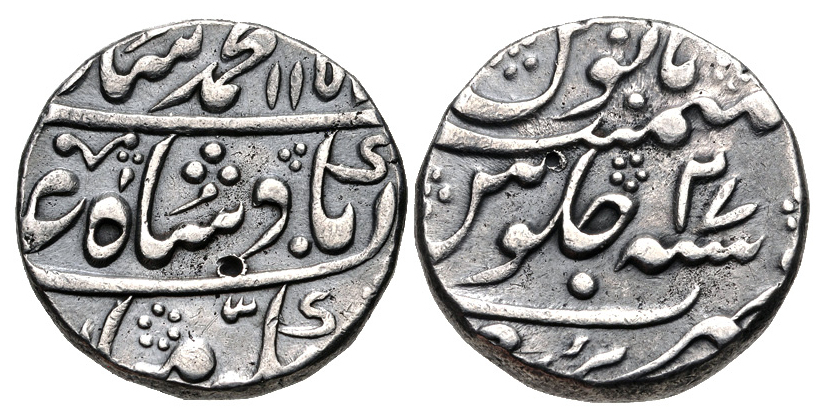
Coinage of Jaipur from the time of Ishvari Singh, in the name of the Mughal emperor Muhammad Shah. Sawau Jaipur mint, dated 1744-1745

After the death of Jai Singh, his 25-year-old son Ishwari Singh ascended the throne. Madho Singh, half brother of Ishwari Singh laid siege around Jaipur in 1748 with the combined forces of the states of Kota, Bundi, Mewar and Marathas. Ishwari singh defeated the combined army at Battle of Rajamahal. The combined forces of Madho Singh got a battering at the hands of Ishwari Singh. It was a major victory for Jaipur and to commemorate this occasion, Ishwari Singh built a second storied tower in 1749 which got the name Isar laat popularly known as Sarga Suli in the Tripolia Bazar. A person named Ganesh Khowal was entrusted with its construction. All the 7 stories of Isat laat are octagonal and after every two storeys is a round gallery. Ishwari Singh lost at the Battle of Bagru, about 20–25 km from Jaipur. He was forced to give lands to Madho Singh and pay tribute to the Holkars.

In 1750, Ishwari Singh, the other contender for the throne committed suicide under the financial pressure, Chauth, by the Marathas, also his queen and concubines committed jauhar fearing loss of honour at the hands of Holkar and Madho Singh was able to capture the throne completely.

On 10 January 1751, 5,000 Marathas entered Jaipur. the pent-up hatred of the Rajputs burst forth and a riot broke out. The Rajputs massacred over 3,000 of them The memorial of this Maharaja, who ruled Jaipur for 7 turbulent years, is situated near the lake Tal Katora near the City Palace complex. It has attractive wall paintings on it.

== Battle of Manupur ==
Ishwari Singh fought alongside the Mughals against the Durrani King Ahmad Shah Abdali in the Battle of Manupur in March 1748. He led the left wing of the Mughal army but was ultimately routed, with Ishwari fleeing the battlefield as a result. The Mughals emerged victorious nonetheless afterward.
