= Qaimkhani =

Muslim community in India and Pakistan

Qaimkhani (also spelled Qayam Khani, Kayamkhani or as Kaimkhani) is a Muslim community originating from India. Most of them migrated to Sindh in Pakistan after the partition of India. They were notable for ruling the Fatehpur and Jhunjhunu regions of Rajasthan from the 1300s to the 1700s.

Qaimkhanis claim to have descended from Chauhan Rajputs who converted from Hinduism to Islam in the 14th century during the reign of Firuz Shah Tughlaq. They ruled between 1384 and 1731 with Fatehpur, Rajasthan as their capital; their territories included Fatehpur, Jhunjhunu and Singhana.

== See also ==
- Muslim Rajputs
