= Ramgarh Shekhawati =

Ramgarh Shekhawati Ramgarh Sethan
- city
- Location in Rajasthan, India Ramgarh Shekhawati (India)
- Coordinates: 28°10′15″N 74°58′40″E
- Country: India
- State: Rajasthan
- District: Sikar
- Established: 1791
- Founder: Poddar family & Ruia Family
- Elevation: 306 m (1,004 ft)

Population (2011)
  - Total: 33,024
  - Density: 2.74/km^{2} (7.1/sq mi)

Languages
  - Official: Hindi
- Time zone: UTC+5:30 (IST)
- Postal code: 331024
- ISO 3166 code: RJ-IN
- Vehicle registration: RJ-

Ramgarh Shekhawati' is a city and a municipality in Ramgarh tehsil of Sikar district in the Indian state of Rajasthan. It is known for more than 125 historic havelis, Temples and Johdas which includes but not limited to Ganga Maiya Temple, Raghunath JI Temple, Jagdish ji Temple, Khemka Balaji Temple, Ramchandra Ji Johda etc., which attracts many tourists.

== History ==
During the second half of the eighteenth century, the prosperous merchant families of the Ruias and the Poddars jointly developed the city of Ramgarh Shekhawati also known as Ramgarh Sethan (Sethon wala Ramgarh).

The Poddars, a family of wool traders from Churu, were the first to establish a settlement there. They had been subjected to heavy taxes by the thakurs of Churu and, in protest, sought to build a more affluent city. The king of Sikar allotted them land for this purpose. The Poddars then built numerous havelis, covered them with imported German paint that have retained their luster for over 230 years.

Later, the Ruias, another wealthy merchant family, arrived. They had been forced from their hometown of Fatehpur after a dispute with the Nawab over trade levies. They joined the Poddars in developing the city.

== Geography ==
Ramgarh Shekhawati is located in Shekhawati region of Rajasthan. The surrounding area is semi-arid. The town sits at the trijunction of Churu district in north, Jhunjhunu district in East and Sikar district in south. Churu is about 17 km from the town. The Nimakidhani, famous as Shri Shivraj Kavia's village, is 3 km from Ramgarh Shekhawati.

== Demographics ==
According to the 2001 Indian census, Ramgarh had a population of 90,124. Males constitute 51% of the population and females 49%. Ramgarh has an average literacy rate of 59%, lower than the national average of 59.5%: male literacy is 69%, and female literacy is 48%. In Ramgarh, 18% of the population is under 6 years of age.

== Economy ==
The city is known for tourism. Mainly for its beautiful havelis. They serve as hotels.

== Transport ==
Ramgarh is connected by road and rail. National Highway 52 passes on western outskirt of town. Ramgarh Shekhawati railway station is located on the eastern part of the town.
