= Fatehpur, Rajasthan =

Fatehpur Fatehpur Shekhawati
- City
- Nickname: Fatehpur
- Location in Rajasthan, India Fatehpur (India)
- Coordinates: 27.98°N 74.95°E
- Country: India
- State: Rajasthan
- District: Sikar

Government
  - Member of Legislative Assembly: Hakam Ali Khan
- Elevation: 324 m (1,063 ft)

Population (2021)
  - City: 305,638
  - Urban: 120,000
  - Rural: 175,000

Languages
  - Official: Hindi or marwari
- Time zone: UTC+5:30 (IST)
- PIN: 332301
- ISO 3166 code: RJ-IN
- Vehicle registration: RJ-23

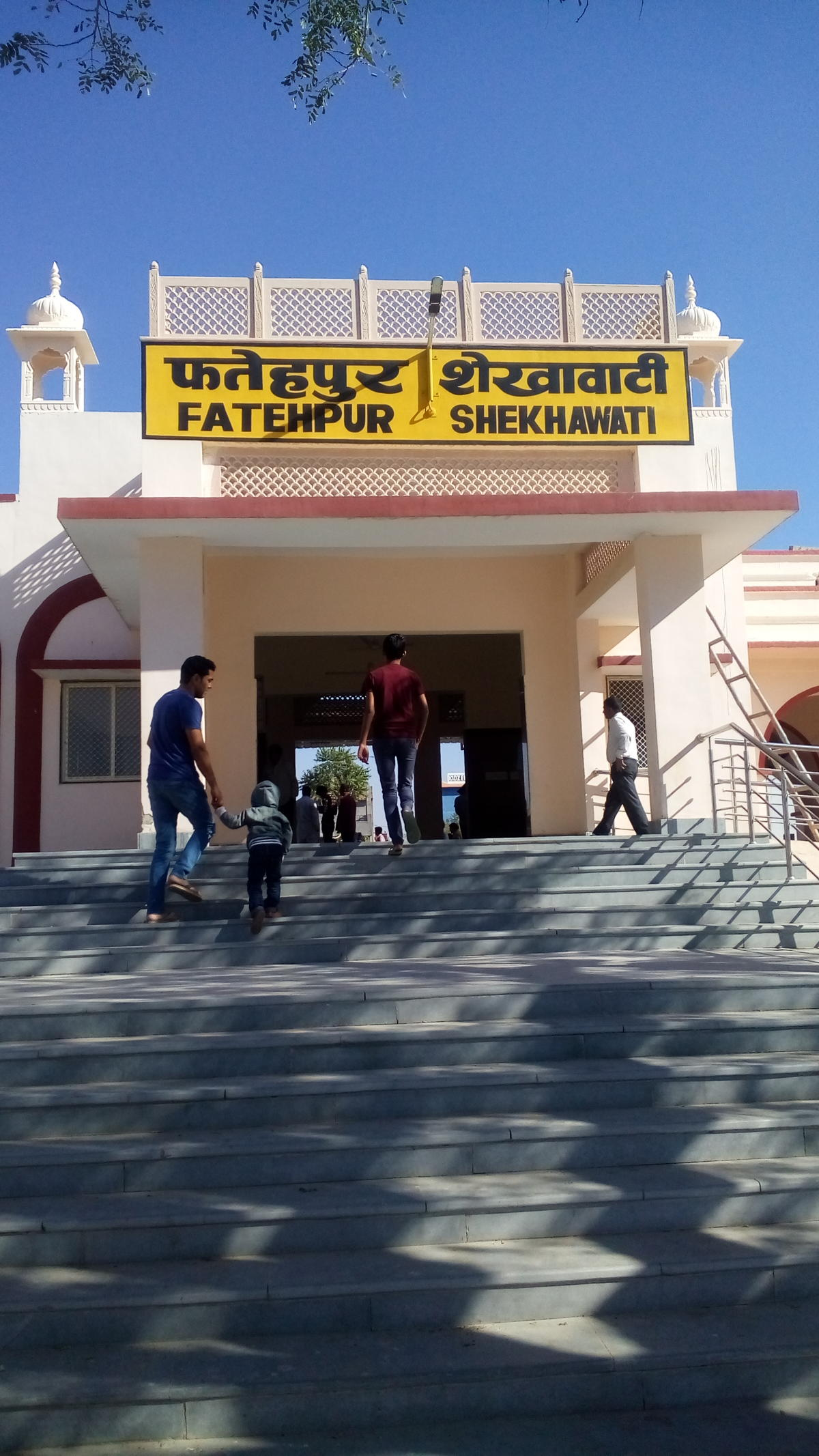
Entrance to Fatehpur Shekhawati Railway Station.

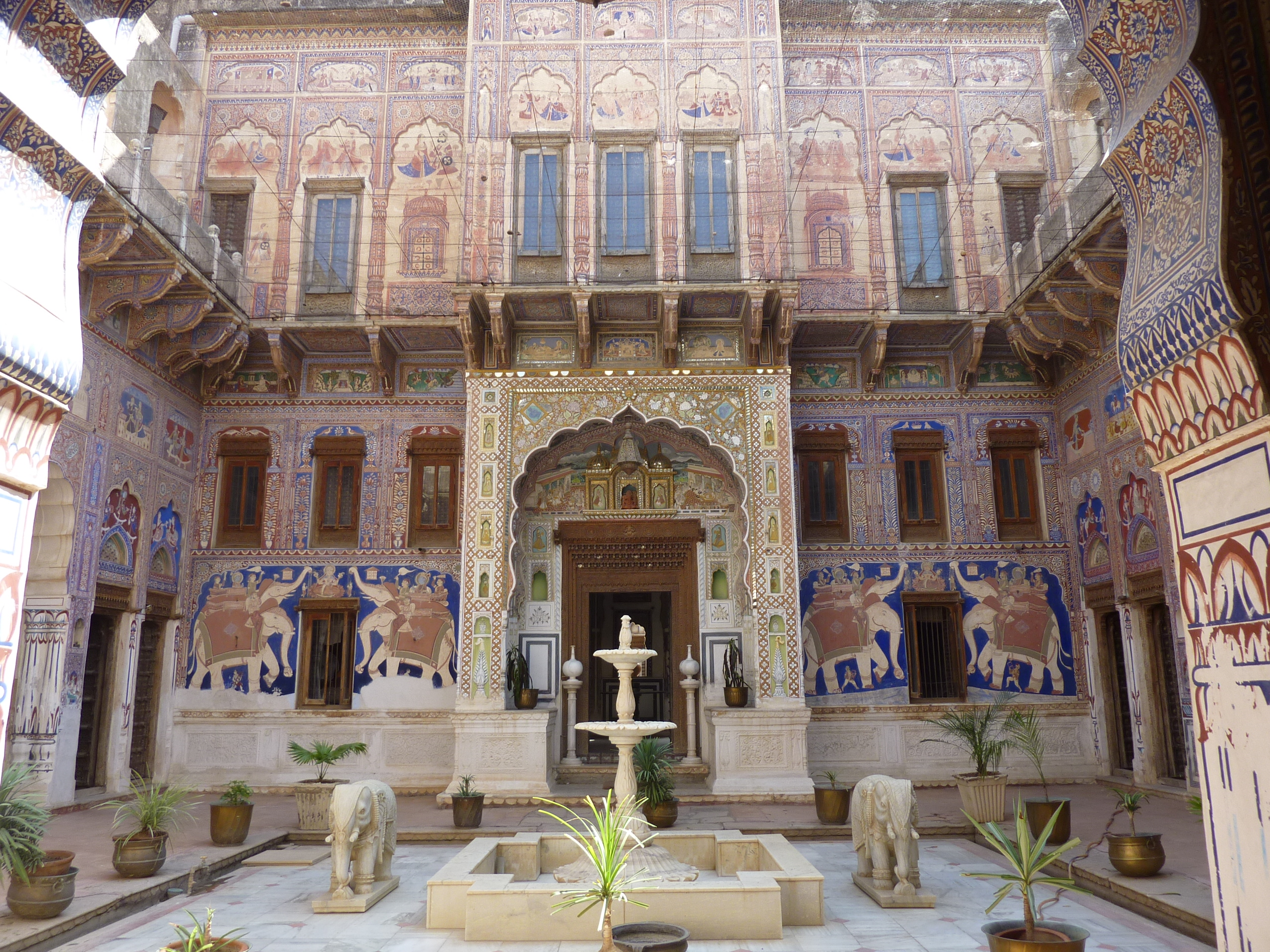
Courtyard of 19th century Nadine Le Prince Haveli.

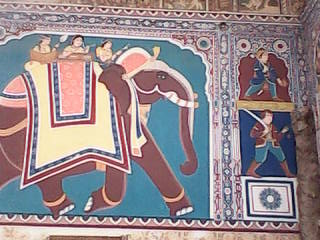
Wall painting in Saraf Haveli.

Fatehpur is a city in the Sikar district of the Indian state of Rajasthan. It is part of the Shekhawati region. It is midway between Sikar city and Bikaner on National Highway 52.

== History ==
In 1449, Fateh Khan Kayamkhani converted muslim rajput founded the city, who was later defeated by Hindu Shekhawat rajputs who took over Fatehpur who ruled the region as Shekhawati till independence of India in 1947.

1799 Battle of Fatehpur, between the Maratha Kingdom of Gwalior led by George Thomas and the Shekhawat Rajput Kingdom of Amber of Jaipur under Sawai Pratap Singh and Rora Ram Ji Khawas was fought here, which resulted in a decisive Jaipur victory.

1739, i.e. samvat 1685, inscriptions shows the Kashthasangh sect of Jainism continued to be practiced in Fatehpur among the Agarwals, and then during the Shekhawat rule in samvat 1861.

1985 Bollywood film Ghulami starting Dharmendra, Naseeruddin Shah, Mithun Chakraborty and Smita Patil was extensively shot here in many of its havelis and the railway station.

It is also the land to Havelis built by Marwaris and many kuldevi temples of the Agarwal community, such as the following:

- Shri Amrit Nath Ashram of the Nath Sampradaya.
- Dwarkadheesh Temple, also known as 'Asharam Temple,' was built in the 19th century and is renowned for its Shekhawati wall paintings, often referred to as an 'Open Air Art Gallery.'
- Nadine Cultural Centre: French artist Nadine Le Prince purchased and restored the "Nand Lal Devra Haveli," a palace built in 1802 by the Devra merchant family, has since transformed it into a local Shekhawati painters art gallery.
- Saraf Haveli: built is approximately 200-year-old ago is known for its original mural oil paintings and aesthetically crafted wooden doors.
- Sitaram Kedia Ki Haveli: Built by Seth Shree Bohitram Kedia, this haveli is known as "Bijliwali Haveli" because it was the first in Fatehpur to have electricity. The family was granted the royal privilege of wearing gold ornaments below the waist after Bohitram Kedia famously used an airplane to scatter invitations for his son's wedding.
- Goenka Haveli: established in 1870, is celebrated for its impressive frescoes, which are considered some of the best in Fatehpur. The paintings, with a focus on stories of Lord Krishna, also feature an excellent painted ceiling in an upstairs room.

== Geography ==
Fatehpur is located at 27.98°N 74.95°E. It has an average elevation of 324 metres (1066 ft). The town is served by the Fatehpur Shekhawati Railway station (code "FPS").

== Climate ==
It has extreme weather conditions throughout the year. In winters, the minimum temperature falls below 0 °C at night. In summer the temperature rises to 50 °C in the afternoon making it one of the hottest places in India.

== See also ==
- List of districts of Rajasthan
