= Madho Singh I =

Maharaja of Jaipur from 1750 to 1768

Sawai Madho Singh I
- Maharaja Sawai of Amber
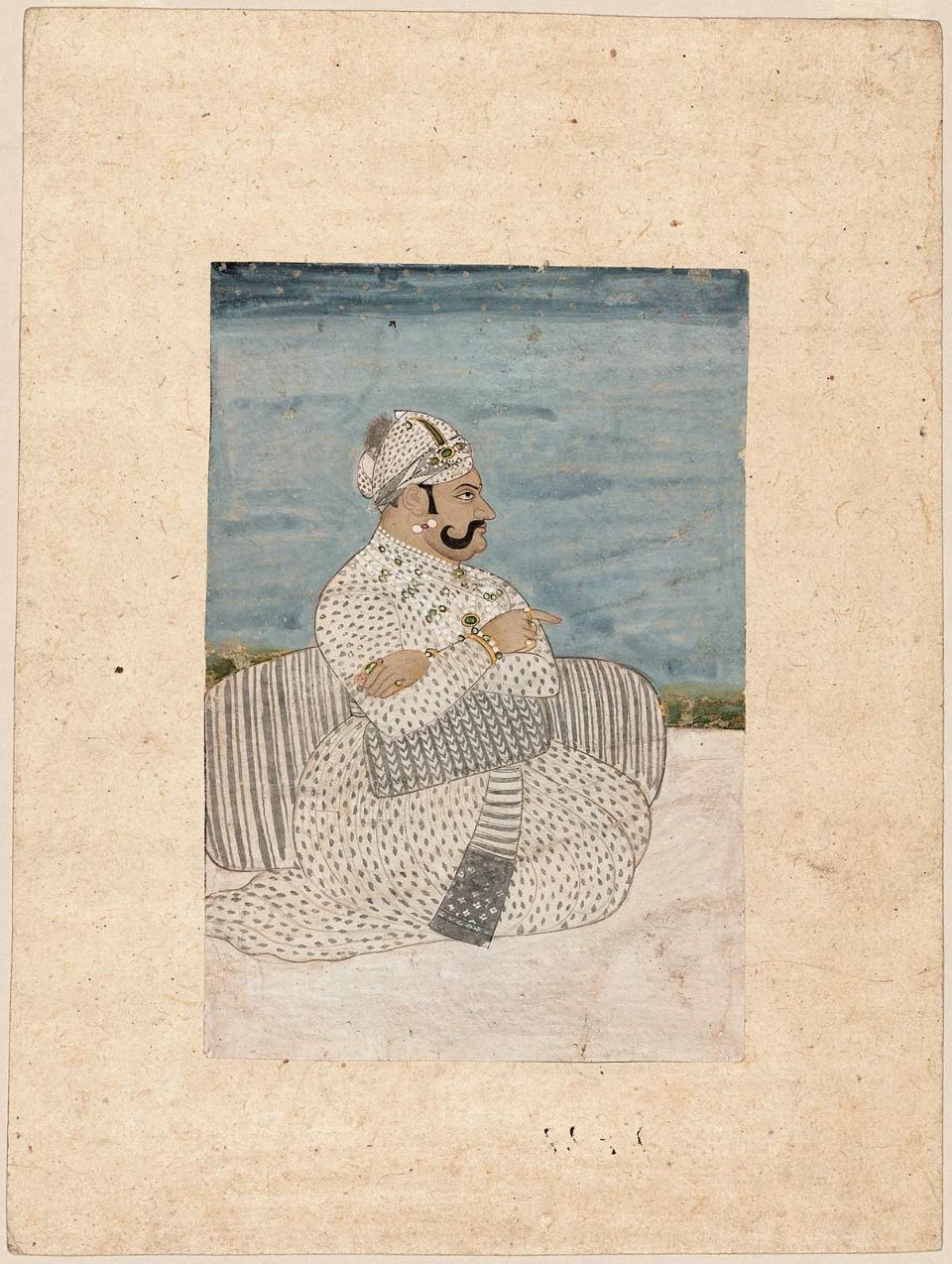
- Portrait of Sawai Madho Singh of Jaipur

3rd Raja of Jaipur
- Reign: 12 December 1750 – 5 March 1768
- Predecessor: Ishwari Singh
- Successor: Prithvi Singh II
- Born: 20 June 1728; Jaipur, Jaipur Kingdom, Rajputana
- Died: 5 March 1768 (aged 39); Jaipur, Jaipur Kingdom, Rajputana
- Spouse: Chundawatji Kundan Kanwarji of Devgarh in Mewar; Sisodiniji Ratan Kanwarji of Banera in Mewar; Bhatiyaniji; Sisodiniji Braj Kanwarji of Banera in Mewar; Rathorji Arjun Kanwarji of Jodhpur-Marwar
- Issue: Man Singh (died infant); Bhawani Singh (died infant); Raghubir Singh (died infant); Prithvi Singh II; Pratap Singh
- House: Kachhwaha
- Father: Jai Singh II
- Mother: Ranawatji Chandra Kanwarji d.of Maharana Amar Singh II of Udaipur-Mewar
- Religion: Hinduism

Sawai Madho Singh I (20 May 1728 – 5 March 1768) was the Kachwaha ruler of the Kingdom of Jaipur. He was the younger son of Maharaja Sawai Jai Singh II and younger half brother of Sawai Ishwari Singh. He became ruler of Jaipur after his brother Sawai Ishwari Singh died in 1750. He established the city of Sawai Madhopur in 1763. He also allied with Vijay Singh Rathore against Ahmad Shah Abdali

== Biography ==
=== Succession dispute and rise to power (1748-1750) ===
Following the death of Maharaja Sawai Jai Singh II in the year 1743, a succession dispute arose in Jaipur. The designated heir, Ishwari Singh, ascended the throne. However, Madho Singh, Jai Singh's younger son from a Mewar princess, contested the claim.

He based his claim on a historical agreement signed in 1708 between Maharana Amar Singh II of Mewar and other Rajput states, including Kingdom of Amber (Jaipur's predecessor). This pact supposedly ensured succession for any son born of a Mewar princess, regardless of birth order. Upholding this tradition, Maharana Jagat Singh II of Mewar supported his grand nephew Madho Singh, and launched a military campaign to enthrone him.

A decisive battle ensued near Rajamahal, where the Mewar forces under Maharana Jagat Singh II clashed with the Marathas, who sided with Ishwari Singh at the Battle of Rajamahal in 1747. The Mewar army suffered defeat. Despite the setback, Ishwari Singh, emboldened by the initial victory, marched against and defeated the Hada Chauhan chiefs of Bundi and Kota with Maratha assistance.

Facing continued opposition from Mewar, Ishwari Singh sought additional Maratha support. However, Malhar Rao Holkar demanded a hefty sum and territorial concessions in exchange for aiding Madho Singh's claim. Unable to bear the pressure and fearing for his safety, Ishwari Singh committed suicide in 1750. This paved the way for Madho Singh's ascension to the throne of Jaipur as Maharaja Sawai Madho Singh I.

Madho Singh I was at Udaipur when his half brother Ishwari Singh committed suicide. Following this Madho Singh was crowned as the new Kachwaha ruler of Jaipur.

Madho Singh invited Jayappa Scindia who arrived in due time along with Malhar Rao Holkar to dinner. Marathas having mindset of getting huge lumpsum from Jaipur,when denied actions changed significantly.Next day on 10 January 1751, about 5,000 Marathas marched through Jaipur and started looting and plunder of the city's temples and monuments. Marathas seemed to have behaved towards Jaipur like city taken by storms. Suddenly the pent-up hatred of the Rajput gentry burst forth and a riot broke out at noon and citizens attacked unsuspecting Marathas. Madho Singh I posted assassins along the escape routes to kill off the Maratha envoys calling for aid.

He won several important battles against other rulers. He later reconciled with the Marathas after rewarding Holkar for his help in gaining the Jaipur throne by giving him the parganas of Rampura, Bhanpura and Tonk in 1753. According to Vir Vinod which is 19th-century creation, Madho Singh gave poison to Maharaja Bakht Singh of Marwar but according to contemporary Persian sources Bakht Singh died due to cholera in 1752.

=== Conflict With Jawahar Singh ===
In December 1765, the Sikhs launched expeditions through Saharanpur, Delhi, and Rewari, causing significant destruction. During this period, Madho Singh was engaged in a conflict with Jawahar Singh of Bharatpur. To strengthen his position, Jawahir Singh hired 25,000 Sikh soldiers. After this truce, Jawahir Singh turned his attention to Dholpur, a region controlled by his step-brother Nahar Singh. He employed 7,000 Sikh soldiers, while Nahar Singh allied with the Marathas. A fierce battle followed on March 13-14, 1766, in which the Sikhs defeated the Marathas. Following their defeat, the Marathas withdrew their support, forcing Nahar Singh to seek refuge with Madho Singh in Jaipur. To avoid further conflict, Madho Singh bribed the Sikhs, who then left Jawahir Singh and returned to Punjab, concluding the hostilities.

In December 1767, Jawahar Singh fought Madho Singh in a Maonda. The Rajputs suffered around 4,000 casualties, while the Jats lost nearly 1,000 men. Jawahar Singh’s army included trained troops with artillery, led by two European officers, Walter Reinhard (known as Sombre and the husband of Begum Samru) and Rene Madec. After this, Madho Singh reorganized his forces and invaded Jawahir Singh’s territory with 16,000 soldiers. In response, Jawahar Singh recruited 5,000 Sikhs. The two armies clashed at Kama on February 29, 1768, where Jawahir Singh was defeated, losing 400 soldiers. The Jats and Sikhs return, but Jawahir Singh recruited an additional Sikhs, bringing his total force to 20,000 at a cost of seven lakh rupees per month. With this reinforced army, he advanced again, causing the Rajputs to fled to Jaipur to take a fortified position and await a military response by the Sikhs and Jats who were too to launch another attack,

== Death ==
He died in 1768 after a rule of 17 years after contracting dysentery. Madho Singh's queen, Chundawatji who belonged to the Chundawat clan, was the daughter of Rawat Jaswant Singh of Deogarh, ruled Jaipur along with her father following her deceased husband's death as the new ruler, Sawai Prithvi Singh II was only five years old at the time. Following Prithvi Singh's death, her second son Sawai Pratap Singh succeeded to the throne.

== Cultural contributions ==
His contribution to the field of art, architecture, town-planning, literature and religion was remarkable. He founded the well planned walled-city of Sawai Madhopur and the well planned town of Sri Madhopur, built several palaces including Madho Niwas in the Chandra Mahal complex of the City Palace, Madho Vilas the leisure palace in the centre of Jai Mahal, the Sisodia Rani Bagh (Queens' Gardens) as well as several temples. The painting atelier (surathkhana) was rejuvenated and a variety of court scenes and several portraits were painted there. He patronized Sportsmen of his State and even sent them to other places within the country to take part in competitions. Likewise, he sent artists from his State to other places to exhibit their skills and produce. He was fond of watching elephant fights, bullfights and other similar sports. He had Shaikh Sadi's Gulistan translated into Sanskrit. A few Sanskrit works were also attributed to him. Many dramas and poetic works were written under his patronage such as Veli Rukmani, Madhav Natakam, Madahava Vijaikavyama, Rajaritinirupana, Sataka, etc. Greatest contribution, at the end of his reign was political stability in the state of Jaipur.

== See also ==
- Kachwaha
