= Rai (title) =

Indian honorific title

Rai is a historical title of royalty and nobility in the Indian subcontinent used by rulers and chieftains of many princely states. It is derived from Raja (king). The Marathi variant Rao/Rav was used as a substitute to King.

When Babur conquered Hindustan, he found many principalities which had been subordinated by the Emperor of Hindustan and innumerable others which never have been effectively subdued. When Akbar ascended to the throne, Hindustan had numerous autonomous and semiautonomous rulers. These hereditary rulers were known by various names such as Rais, Rajas, Ranas, Rao and Rawals.

During Mughal rule, while conferring a title on a Hindu chief the word Raja or Rai was added to the name of person. The Mughals seems to have inherited the practice of bestowing titles from the Sultans of Delhi. The appellation "Rai" is primarily applied to men, while for women the appellation "Rani" is used.

During British Rule, Rai Sahib and Rai Bahadur were titles of honour given for service of visionary leadership to the nation. They were given immense power too and were equivalent to autonomous native rulers within their feudal estates

Other variations of Rai are Roy, Ray and Rao. These are also used as titles by Bhumihar, Karanas, Kayasthas and Ahirs. Rai was the title used by the Zamindars (landowners) of Eastern Uttar Pradesh and Bihar during the colonial rule after the Permanent settlement system introduced in Bengal-Bihar and the state of Benaras.

The descendants of these earlier rulers, chieftains and leaders still use these titles as patronymics, but these titles although having social acceptance and prestige as per local customs, holds no recognition and privilege in the eye of law after the abolition of titles in 1971 from the Indian Constitution.

== See also ==
- Maratha titles

== Bibliography ==
- WorldStatesmen – India
- Jain, Vijay K. (2015), Acarya Samantabhadra's Svayambhustotra: Adoration of The Twenty-four Tirthankara, Vikalp Printers, ISBN 978-81-903639-7-6, " This article incorporates text from this source, which is in the public domain."
- "Sheikhupura Chamber of Commerce & Industry". scci.net.pk.
- Pakistan; Bhatti, R.M.Z.; Mushtaq, M.I. (2013). Federal & Provincial the Minor Acts: Civil & Criminal.
