= Jhadhewa, Sikar =

Jhadhewa
- Village
- Location in Rajasthan, India Jhadhewa (India)
- Coordinates: 27.84310°N 75.23843°E
- Country: India
- State: Rajasthan
- District: Sikar

Government
  - Body: Panchayat
  - Sarpanch: Rajendra Prasad Bhaskar
- Elevation: 424.24 m (1,391.9 ft)

Languages
  - Official: Hindi
- Time zone: UTC+5:30 (IST)
- PIN: 332316
- Telephone code: 91-1573
- ISO 3166 code: RJ-IN
- Vehicle registration: RJ-23
- Nearest city: Nawalgarh
- Distance from Nawalgarh: 2 kilometres (1.2 mi) (land)
- Distance from Sikar: 32.7 kilometres (20.3 mi) (land)
- Distance from Jhunjhunu: 41 kilometres (25 mi) (land)
- Distance from Laxmangarh: 22 kilometres (14 mi) (land)
- Avg. summer temperature: 46-48 °C
- Avg. winter temperature: 0-1 °C

Jhadhewa is a village in the Laxmangarh administrative region of Sikar district of Indian state Rajasthan. It lies 22 kilometres (14 mi) east of Laxmangarh and 2 kilometres (1.2 mi) west of Nawalgarh. It borders Birodi Bari, Birodi Chhoti, Jogiyon ka bas and Bhoodha Ka Bas villages.

== Village government ==
Village fall under Birodi Bari Panchayat. The current sarpanch is Rajendra Prasad Bhaskar.

== Climate ==
Village has a hot summer, scanty rainfall, a chilly winter season and a general dryness of the air, except in the brief monsoon season. The average maximum and minimum temperatures are 28-30 and 15 - 16 degrees Celsius, respectively.

== Transportation ==
Village is connected by a two lane asphalt road to Laxmangarh and Nawalgarh. Nawalgarh Railway station, 2 kilometres (1.2 mi) from village is the nearest railway station, which is well connected to Jaipur, Delhi and other cities. Asphalt roads connect the village to surrounding villages and to Laxmangarh.

== Village location ==
The village lies on road connecting Laxmangarh to Nawalgarh.
