= Birodi Bari =

- Village
- Location in Rajasthan, India Birodi Bari (India)
- Coordinates: 27.842547°N 75.219306°E
- Country: India
- State: Rajasthan
- District: Sikar

Government
  - Body: Panchayat
  - Sarpanch: Manju Devi
- Elevation: 424.24 m (1,391.9 ft)

Population (2011)
  - Total: 1,242

Languages
  - Official: Hindi
- Time zone: UTC+5:30 (IST)
- PIN: 332316
- Telephone code: 91-1573
- ISO 3166 code: RJ-IN
- Vehicle registration: RJ-23
- Nearest city: Nawalgarh
- Distance from Nawalgarh: 3.5 kilometres (2.2 mi) (land)
- Distance from Sikar: 32 kilometres (20 mi) (land)
- Distance from Jhunjhunu: 42 kilometres (26 mi) (land)
- Distance from Laxmangarh: 20 kilometres (12 mi) (land)
- Avg. summer temperature: 35-40 °C
- Avg. winter temperature: 0-5 °C

Birodi Bari or Birodi Badi or Bidodi Badi or Beerodi Bari is a village in the Laxmangarh administrative region of Sikar district of Indian state Rajasthan. It lies 20 kilometres (12 mi) east of Laxmangarh and 3.5 kilometres (2.2 mi) west of Nawalgarh. It borders Khinwasar, Bidsar, Bidasar, Birodi Chhoti, Jhadhewa, Jogiyon ka bas, Ramsingh Pura and Bhoodha Ka Bas (Malio Ki Dhani) villages.

The 500 acres (2.0 km^{2}) village has an overall population of about 4,411 of whom 2,000 are members of the Jat ethnic group, while the main Jat gotra of the village are Sunda, Jakhar, Bhaskar, Beejala, Dudhwal, Kulhadia, Dotasara, Kansujiya, Sewada, Nehra, Godara, Repaswal etc. Other castes include Brahmin, Jangid, Mali, Nayak, Bhopa and Balai (956).

== Village governance ==
Birodi Bari, Birodi Chhoti, Bhoodha Ka Bas, Jhadhewa, Jogiyon ka Bas and Ramsingh Pura fall under Birodi Bari Panchayat. The current sarpanch is Manju Devi . The panchayat has 13 ward members chosen by the people through polling.

=== Villages under Birodi Bari gram panchayat samiti ===
- Birodi Bari (बिड़ोदी बड़ी)
- Jhadhewa (झाडेवा)
- Bhoodha Ka Bas (भूधा का बास)
- Ramsingh Pura (रामसिंह पुरा)
- Birodi Chhoti (बिड़ोदी छोटी)
- Jogiyon ka Bas (जोगियो का बास)
- Chak Birodi (चक बिड़ोदी)

== Village economy ==
Some 1000 people, about 70% of the population, are engaged in farming, many are government teachers, forces personnel, in Food Corporation of India, members of the Delhi Police, state policemen, electricity department workers, army, one soldier is a black belt in karate. Nearly 200 villagers are employed in occupations other than agriculture.

== Climate ==
Birodi has a hot summer, scanty rainfall, a chilly winter season, and general dryness of the air, except in the brief monsoon season. The average maximum and minimum temperatures are 28 - 34 and 15 - 20 degrees Celsius, respectively.

== Transportation ==
Birodi is connected by a two-lane asphalt road to Laxmangarh and Nawalgarh. Nawalgarh Railway station, 3 kilometres (1.9 mi) from Birodi is the nearest railway station, which is well connected to Jaipur, Delhi and other cities. Asphalt roads connect the village to surrounding villages and to Laxmangarh.

Camel carts and bullock carts were formerly the chief means of transportation and are being replaced by Motorcycles and other automobiles. Quite a few villagers walked to Nawalgarh and other surrounding places. In the rainy season, womenfolk bring grass on their heads for cows and buffaloes.

== Education ==
The villagers claim to be fully literate while all children now attend school. However, many women remain illiterate, although literacy rates are improving. Many students of the village have obtained admission to pioneering engineering institutes through various competitions run by the IIT, AIEEE, etc., as well as into medical colleges through various competitions like AIPMT, Rajasthan Pre Medical Test and other exams.

When it comes to the Education among clans, Sunda is the most educated clan in the whole Panchayat & Sunda gave 5 IITians, 1 IFS and 25+ Govt. employees to Central and Rajasthan Government.

== Religion ==
All villagers follow the Hindu religion. Jats, Harijans, Brahmins and members of the Mali caste live in the village. Among the Jats Sunda, Bhaskar, Mahann, Pilania, Meel etc. are all subcastes. The Kamma and Saini are the only subcastes of the Mali caste. Harijans are divided into Kanwalia and Denwal subcastes. There is a single family of Chotiya Gotra Brahmins.

== Society and culture ==
Village society is governed solely by Hindu rituals although the younger generation has been affected by western cultural influences.

== Music and Entertainment ==
Folk songs are sung by women during weddings and on other social occasions. Menfolk sing dhamaal ( traditional Holi songs). Many villagers own TV's as well as radios and satellite dishes. The sound of popular Hindi music emanating from stereos and other devices is heard from different houses during the afternoon and evening.

== Games and sports ==
Most of the children play soccer/football. Few villagers also play volleyball and cricket. Birodi Bari football team is popular in their district with their players' ability and sportsmanship. There are a few national level players and many state level players. Villagers can be seen playing cards in chaupal (village common area).

== Festivals ==
Villagers celebrate all major Hindu festivals. Some of the major festivals are Holi, Deepawali, Makar Sankranti, Raksha Bandhan, Sawan, Teej, Gangaur etc.

== Village location ==
The village lies on road connecting Laxmangarh to Nawalgarh.

== See also ==
- Laxmangarh
- Nawalgarh
- Sikar district
