= Birodi Chhoti, India =

Birodi Chhoti
- Village
- Location in Rajasthan, India Birodi Chhoti (India)
- Coordinates: 27.835997°N 75.230505°E
- Country: India
- State: Rajasthan
- District: Sikar

Government
  - Body: Panchayat
  - Sarpanch: Rajendra Prasad Bhaskar (BJP)
- Elevation: 424.24 m (1,391.9 ft)

Population (2011)
  - Total: 842

Languages
  - Official: Hindi
- Time zone: UTC+5:30 (IST)
- PIN: 332316
- Telephone code: 91-1573
- ISO 3166 code: RJ-IN
- Vehicle registration: RJ-23
- Nearest city: Nawalgarh
- Distance from Nawalgarh: 5 kilometres (3.1 mi) (land)
- Distance from Sikar: 32 kilometres (20 mi) (land)
- Distance from Jhunjhunu: 42 kilometres (26 mi) (land)
- Distance from Laxmangarh: 23 kilometres (14 mi) (land)
- Avg. summer temperature: 46-48 °C
- Avg. winter temperature: 0-1 °C

Birodi Chhoti (also known as Bidodi Chhoti or Beerodi Chhoti) is a village within the Laxmangarh administrative region of Sikar district, Rajasthan, India. Formerly known as Swami ki Birodi, the village is 250 years old and lies 18 kilometres (11 mi) east of Laxmangarh and 3 kilometres (1.9 mi) west of Nawalgarh. Bidodi chhoti (small) borders Khinwasar, Bidsar, Bidasar, Birodi Badi, Jhareva, Jogiyon ka bas, and Brahmino ki Dhani (Ramsingh Pura) and Malio Ki Dhani villages.

The 500 acres (2.0 km^{2}) village has an overall population of about 1,430 of whom most are Jat ethnic group, while the main gotra of the village are Bhaskar, Godara, and Lodha. Other castes include Brahmin, and Harijan.

== Transportation ==
Birodi is connected by a two lane asphalt road to Laxmangarh and Nawalgarh. Nawalgarh Railway station, 2.5 kilometres (1.6 mi) from Birodi is the nearest railway station, which is well connected to Jaipur, Delhi and other cities.

There is a road between Nawalgarh and Birodi chhoti. Asphalt roads connect the village to surrounding villages and to Laxmangarh. Camel carts and bullock carts were formerly the chief means of transportation and are being replaced by motorcycles and other automobiles. Quite a few villagers walk to Nawalgarh and other surrounding places. In the rainy season, womenfolk can be seen bringing grass on their heads for cows and buffaloes.
