= Mirzwas =

Mirjwas
- Village
- Location in Rajasthan, India Mirjwas (India)
- Coordinates: 27.886141°N 75.178691°E
- Country: India
- State: Rajasthan
- District: Sikar

Languages
  - Official: Hindi
- Time zone: UTC+5:30 (IST)
- PIN: 332401
- Telephone code: 91-1573
- ISO 3166 code: RJ-IN
- Vehicle registration: RJ-23
- Distance from Nawalgarh, Rajasthan: 11 kilometres (6.8 mi) NW (land)
- Distance from Laxmangarh: 18 kilometres (11 mi) SE (land)
- Distance from Sikar: 41 kilometres (25 mi) (land)
- Avg. summer temperature: 46 °C (115 °F)
- Avg. winter temperature: 1 °C (34 °F)

Mirzwas, is a village in the Laxmangarh administrative region of the Sikar district of Rajasthan state in India. The village lies 18 kilometres (11 mi) east of Laxmangarh and 11 kilometres (6.8 mi) from Nawalgarh. The borders villages including Bidsar, Bidasar, Kheri Radan, Dundlod, and Sankhu .

== History ==
Pre-Indian Independence
Before independence, the village was inhabited by Jats.

== Village government ==
Mirzwas falls under BidaserPanchayat. The title of leader is Sarpanch, The panchayat has chosen ward members by the people through polling.
