= Jakhal =

- Village
- Jakhal Burj (Fort) in Jhunjhunu district, Rajasthan

- Location in Rajasthan, India Jakhal (India)
- Coordinates: 27.91°N 75.44°E
- Country: India
- State: Rajasthan
- District: Jhunjhunu
- Elevation: 375 m (1,230 ft)

Population (2011)
  - Total: 7,493

Languages
  - Official: Hindi, Rajasthani
- Time zone: UTC+5:30 (IST)
- PIN: 333305
- Telephone code: 01594
- ISO 3166 code: RJ-IN

Jakhal is a village located in the Nawalgarh tehsil of Jhunjhunu district of Rajasthan, India. It is located in Shekhawati region, approx. 35 km south of Jhunjhunu city and 20 km east of Nawalgarh. There is another town with the same name, Jakhal Mandi and with a Jakhal Railway Station in Haryana.

Jakhal was founded by Salehadi Singh Shekhawat on 9 August 1732 (teej of Sravana Shukla 1789). Although hundreds of Jakhal's residents serve in the armed forces, the village's main occupation is farming. In the monsoon seasons, the main crops are bajara (pearl millet), moth, and guar, but in winter, the main crops are wheat, barley, sarson (mustard oil, mustard seed), and chana (chickpeas). The major part of the population belongs to Jat community with Moond, Khedar and garhwal Jat gotras.

As per the constitution of India and the Panchyati Raaj Act, Jakhal village is administrated by a Sarpanch (Head of Village), who is elected representative of village. As of 2020, Manoj Moond is the sarpanch of Jakhal. He is serving his second term after being elected for the first time in 2010. He enjoys great popularity in the village and is also famous for defeating Shrawan Singh by 7 votes, getting a total of 1683 votes in the highly anticipated general elections of January 2020.

== History ==
=== 1732 AD Founder: Thakur Salehadi Singh ===
Jakhal was founded by Thakur Salehadi Singh Shekhawat on 9 August 1732 (Teej of Sravana Shukla 1789). Salehadi Singh was the younger brother of Thakur Shardul Singh (ruler of Jhunjhunu). He was also the commander of his brother's army. He fought several wars on the behalf of his brother. However, he has to stay in Jakhal before attacking Bhorki. He was kind of impressed with the natural beauty of the area and decided to conquer the area from the local warlord. The warlord decided to keep quiet because he knew the stories about Salehadi Singh's bravery.

=== Jakhal Fort ===
In 1735, Salehadi Singh built a bastion (burj) in Jakhal. It is believed that Sikar's king Laxaman Singh destroyed parts of this burj in a cannon attack. The remains of this burj is still there (see photo right). Salehadi Singh's four sons – Samarth Singh, Sangraam Singh, Shev Singh, and Gulab Singh – decided to stay in Jakhal and their descendants still live in Jakhal in "Chaar Paana".

== Geography ==
Jakhal is located at 27.91°N 75.44°E. It has an average elevation of 375 metres (1230 feet).

== Climate ==
Jakhal is located in the Shekhawati region of Rajasthan with predominantly hot and arid climate.Large number of people are involved in farming and most of them are still dependent on monsoon for their crops.

== Neighborhoods ==
To the north of Jakhal is Bugala, Ajari, Baragaon, Jhunjhunu, Udawas. To the east of Jakhal is Sonthali, Titanwar, Gudha Gorji ka,. To the south is Bhorki, Inderpura, Udaipur Shekhawati, Dhamora. To the west is Kari, Barwasi, Nawalgarh, Mukundgarh, Sikar, Dundlod.

== People ==
The Jakhal village has population of 6970 of which 3459 are males while 3511 are females as per Population Census 2011.

In Jakhal village population of children with age 0-6 is 996 which makes up 14.29 % of total population of village. Average Sex Ratio of Jakhal village is 1015 which is higher than Rajasthan state average of 928. Child Sex Ratio for the Jakhal as per census is 818, lower than Rajasthan average of 888.

Jakhal village has higher literacy rate compared to Rajasthan. In 2011, literacy rate of Jakhal village was 72.75 % compared to 66.11 % of Rajasthan. In Jakhal Male literacy stands at 86.53 % while female literacy rate was 59.65 %.
