= Birodi, India =

Birodi, India may refer to:

- Birodi Chhoti, a village in Sikar district in Rajasthan state in India
- Birodi Bari, a village in Sikar district in Rajasthan state in India
