= Hari Baba Ashram, Bidsar =

Religious site in Rajasthan

Shri Hari Baba Ashram
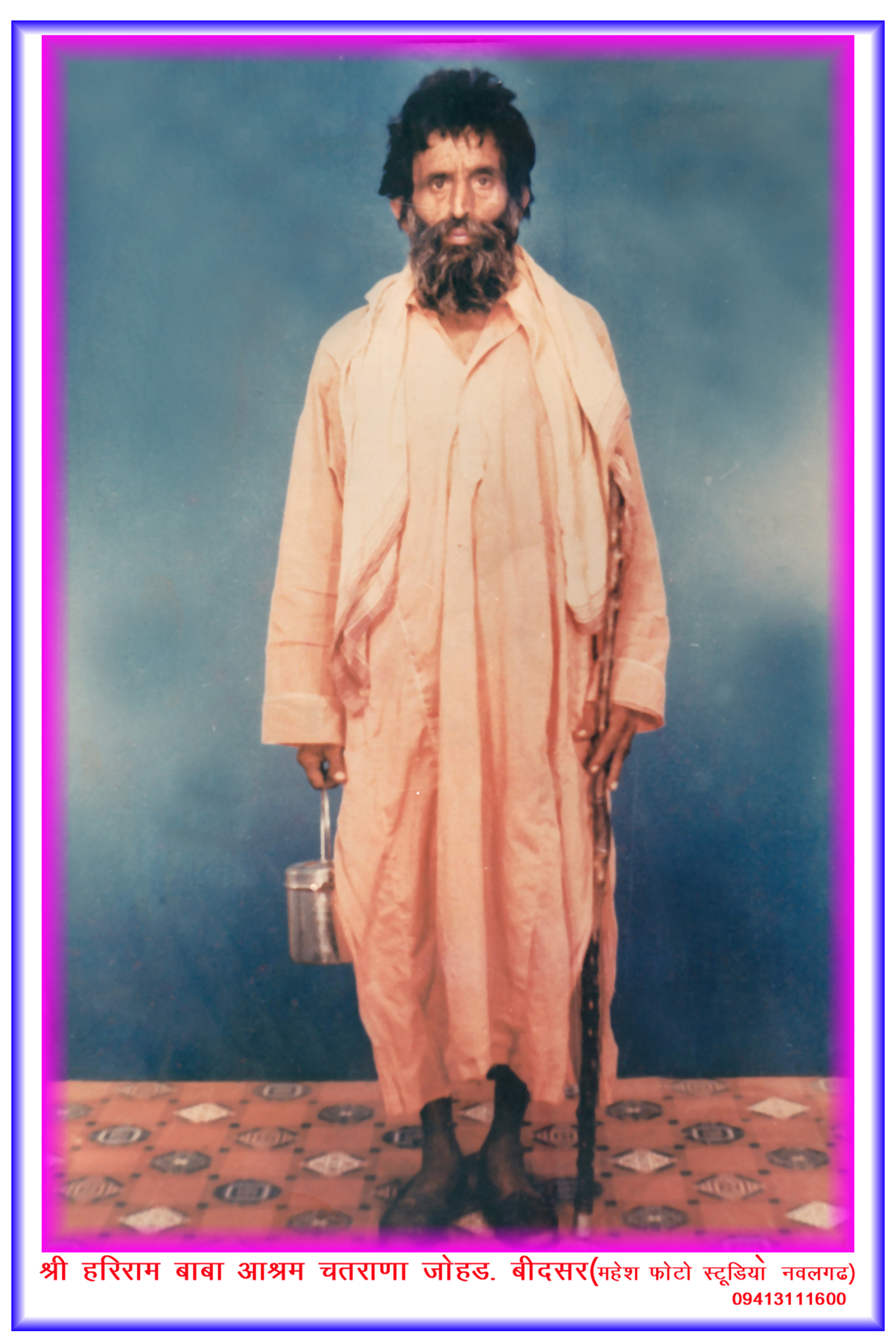
- Photo of Saint Shri Hari Baba
- Worshiper Title: Pujari
- Location: Bidsar, Sikar District, Rajasthan, India
- Name in Native Language: हरिबाबा आश्रम
- Coordinates: 27°52′47.64″N 75°11′47.86″E
- Architecture: Vastu Shastra and Pancharatra scripture
- Date Built: 20th Century
Religion

Hari Baba Ashram (Hindi: हरिबाबा आश्रम) or Hari Ram Baba Samadhi is a religious site for the devotees of Saint Shri Hari Baba. It is situated in Sikar district of Rajasthan.

Hari Baba Ashram (हरिबाबा आश्रम) attracts thousands of Rajasthani worshipers throughout the year. On Chaitra Purnima, large Jagaran are organized every year where more than 2 to 3 thousands of people assemble here to pay their homage to the deity. Hari Baba Ashram Samiti looks after the management of the Ashram and the fairs. The Ashram of Sri Hari Baba is situated right in the north of the Bidsar Village.

== Location ==
Bidsar is a part of the Sikar district Sikar in Rajasthan, and it is situated on the Nawalgarh to Laxmangarh Road in Bidsar (Chatrana Johra) approximately 35 kilometers from Sikar, 8 kilometers from Nawalgarh, and 22 kilometers from Laxmangarh. Bidsar lies under the jurisdiction of the Bidasar Panchayat Samiti and is well connected with Sikar by a regular bus service run by the Rajasthan State Road Transport Corporation. Indian Airlines and Jet Air fly to Jaipur, from where Bidsar is 3.3 hours drive via a taxi or a bus.
