= Nawalgarh =

Nawalgarh may refer to:

- Nawalgarh, Rajasthan, India
- Nawalgarh, former name of Nalagarh, Himachal Pradesh, India
