= Bidsar =

- Village
- Location in Rajasthan, India Bidsar (India)
- Coordinates: 27.869763°N 75.214591°E
- Country: India
- State: Rajasthan
- District: Sikar

Government
  - Body: Panchayat
  - Sarpanch: Smt. Sushila Devi
- Elevation: 424.24 m (1,391.9 ft)

Population (2011)
  - Total: 1,547

Languages
  - Official: Hindi
- Time zone: UTC+5:30 (IST)
- PIN: 332316
- Telephone code: 91-1573
- ISO 3166 code: RJ-IN
- Vehicle registration: RJ-23
- Nearest city: Nawalgarh and Laxmangarh
- Distance from Nawalgarh: 6 kilometres (3.7 mi) (land)
- Distance from Sikar: 36 kilometres (22 mi) (land)
- Distance from Jhunjhunu: 45 kilometres (28 mi) (land)
- Distance from Dundlod: 7 kilometres (4.3 mi) (land)
- Distance from Birodi Bari: 3 kilometres (1.9 mi) (land)
- Avg. summer temperature: 46-48 °C
- Avg. winter temperature: 0-1 °C

Bidsar, or Beedsar is a village in the Laxmangarh administrative region of the Sikar district of Rajasthan state in India. The village lies 21 kilometres (13 mi) east of Laxmangarh and 6 kilometres (3.7 mi) from Nawalgarh. The borders villages and towns including Birodi Bari, Bidasar, Mirzwas, Dundlod, and Nawalgarh. According to the 2011 census the population of Bidsr is 1,547.

== History ==
Before independence, the village was inhabited by Garhwal Jats. It is considered that a person, name Bida established Bidsar. The village was dominated by Garhwal Jats.

== Village government ==
Bidsar falls under Bidasar Panchayat. The title of leader is Sarpanch, The panchayat has 13 ward members chosen by the people through polling.

== Village economy ==
Some 1500 people, about 80% of the population are engaged in farming. Village agriculture is dependent on the monsoon rains although today many farms use artesian wells for irrigation.

== Climate ==
Bidsar has a hot summer, scanty rainfall, a chilly winter season and a general dryness of the air, except in the brief monsoon season. The average maximum and minimum temperatures are 28-30 and 15 - 16 degrees Celsius, respectively.

== Transportation ==
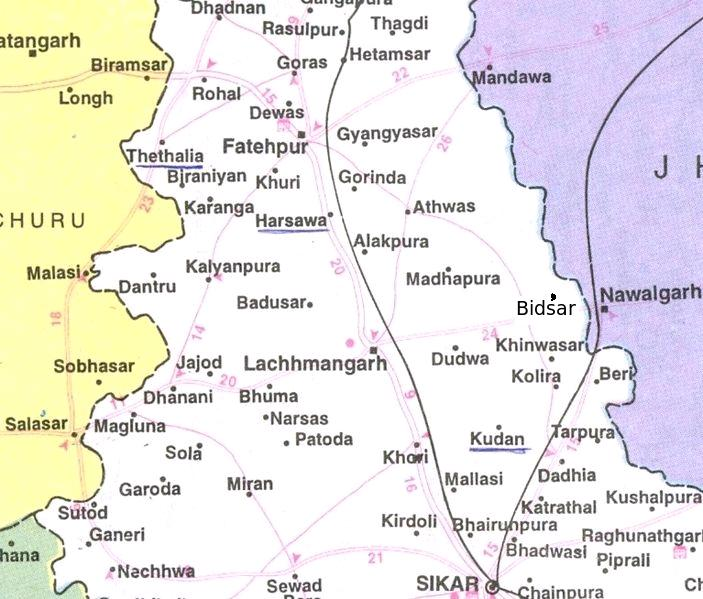
Location within the Sikar district

Bidsar is connected by a two lane asphalt road to Laxmangarh and Nawalgarh. Nawalgarh Railway station 8 kilometres (5.0 mi) from Bidsar, is the nearest railway station, which is well connected from Jaipur, Delhi and other cities. Asphalt roads connect the village to surrounding villages and to Laxmangarh.

Camel carts and bullock carts were formerly the chief means of transportation and are being replaced by bicycles and other automobiles. Quite a few villagers walked to Nawalgarh and other surrounding places. In the rainy season, womenfolk bring grass on their heads for cows and buffaloes.

== Education ==
The villagers claim to be fully literate while all children now attend school. However, many women remain illiterate, although literacy rates are improving. Many students of the village have obtained admission to pioneering engineering institutes as well as into medical colleges through various competitions run by the IIT, AIEEE etc., as well as into medical colleges through various competitions like AIPMT, Rajasthan Pre Medical Test and other exams. Some village students are studying in institutes including the Jawaharlal Nehru University, Indian Institute of Technology, Indian Institute of Management . Besides these, other careers such as teaching, nursing, and the defense forces are also popular. Village has one Govt. Secondary School and one Government Primary School.

== Religion ==
Majority of the citizenry practises Hinduism. Jats, Harijans, Brahmins live in the village. Among the Jats, Garhwal, Khichar, Punia, Rad, Dotasara, Sunda, Asiagh, Kasania, Sewda are all subcastes.

== Society and culture ==
Village society is governed solely by Hindu rituals although the younger generation has been affected by western cultural influences.

== Music and entertainment ==
Folk songs are sung by women during weddings and on other social occasions. Menfolk sing dhamaal ( traditional Holi songs). Many villagers own TV's as well as radios and satellite dishes. The sound of popular Hindi music emanating from stereos and other devices is heard from different houses during the afternoon and evening.

== Games and sports ==
Most of the children play cricket. Some villagers also play volleyball and football. Villagers can be seen playing cards in chaupal (village common area).

== Festivals ==
Villagers celebrate all major Hindu festivals. Some of the major festivals are Holi, Deepawali, Makar Sankranti, Raksha Bandhan, Sawan, Teej, and Gauga Peer, Gangaur.

== Religious places ==
- Hari Baba Ashram, Bidsar (Chatarana Johra)
- Bala Giri Baba (Bhisrana Johra)
- Ganesh Ji Mandir (Kumana Johra)
- Shiv Mandir (Bidsar Bus Stand)

== See also ==
- Sikar District
- Laxmangarh
