= Girdharpura Shahpura =

- Village
- Location in Rajasthan, India Girdharpura Shahpura (India)
- Coordinates: 27.77°N 75.40°E
- Country: India
- State: Rajasthan
- District: Jhunjhunu
- Elevation: 379 m (1,243 ft)

Languages
  - Official: Hindi
- Time zone: UTC+5:30 (IST)
- PIN: 333 307
- Telephone code: 91-1594
- ISO 3166 code: RJ-IN
- Vehicle registration: RJ-18

Girdharpura Shahpura is a village in the district of Jhunjhunu, Rajasthan, India?approximately 22.2 km from Nawalgarh.
