= Sotwara =

- Village
- Sotwara
- Interactive map of Sotwara
- Coordinates: 26.9°N 75.8°E
- Country: India
- State: Rajasthan
- District: Jhunjhunu
- Tehsil: Nawalgarh

Government
  - Type: Democratic
  - Body: Panchayat
  - Surpanch: Heeramani devi
- Elevation: 386 m (1,266 ft)

Population (2011)
  - Total: 3,118

Languages
  - Official: Hindi, Rajasthani
- Time zone: UTC+5:30 (IST)
- Pincode(s): 333707
- Area code(s): 01594
- ISO 3166 code: RJ-IN
- Vehicle registration: RJ-18 (jhunjhunu)
- Website: www.rajasthan.gov.in

Sotwara is a village situated in the Jhunjhunu district, state of Rajasthan, Western India. It is 21 km away from Jhunjhunu and almost 14 km from Nawalgarh, and also 4 km away from Sikar-Loharu State Highway-8, which is one of the best transportation way between Sikar-Jhunjhunu-Loharu.

It has nearly 2500 houses and has its own Gram Panchayat (Local Self Governing Body) which has Nawalgarh, Rajasthan as its Tehsil.

== Language ==
Basically Rajasthani Marwari is more popular here but Hindi also has the same respect.

== Near By Villages ==
Dumra ( 3 km ), Mandasi ( 3 km ), Jejusar ( 5 km ), Kairu ( 5 km ), Kumawas ( 7 km ) are the nearby Villages to Sotwara. deogaon 5 km

== Education ==
This village has around 3 primary schools for kids and a Government Senior Secondary school for high schooling which has Science and Arts streams for high education. And, there are also two private institutions for the same. Many students from outside of the village come here to get better education.

== Pin Code ==
Pin code for this village is 333707 .
