= Kari, Jhunjhunu =

Kari
- village
- Country: India
- State: Rajasthan

Government
  - Body: Gram panchayat

Languages
  - Official: Hindi
- Time zone: UTC+5:30 (IST)
- ISO 3166 code: RJ-IN

Kari is a village located in the Nawalgarh tehsil of Jhunjhunu district of Rajasthan, India. It belongs to Jaipur Division 150 km from state capital Jaipur.

It is located in shekhawati region, approx. 29 km south of Jhunjhunu city and 17 km east of Nawalgarh.

Kari's residents serve in the armed forces, Civil services and other govt. services. But village's main occupation is farming. In the monsoon seasons, the main crops are bajara (pearl millet), moth, and guar, but in winter, the main crops are wheat, barley, sarson (mustard oil, mustard seed), and chana (chickpeas).

It is a 400 year old village. Brahmans are said to be the first inhabitants of the village.

The postal pincode for the village is 333305. Telephone Code / Std Code: 01594.

== Overview ==
Kari Gram Panchayat is a Rural Local Body in Nawalgarh Panchayat Samiti part of Jhunjhunu Zila Parishad. There are total 4 Villages under Kari Gram Panchayat jurisdiction. Gram Panchayat Kari is further divided into 13 Wards. Gram Panchayat Kari has total 15 elected members by people.

The total geographical area of Kari village is 1034 Hectares / 10.34 KM^{2}.

The nearest police station is located in Nawalgarh tahsil.

As per the constitution of India and the Panchyati Raaj Act, Kari village is administrated by a Sarpanch (Head of Village), who is elected representative of village.

Bugala (5 KM), Niwai (7 KM), Kolsiya (7 KM), Chhau (7 KM), Bhorki (8 KM) are the nearby Villages to Kari. Kari is surrounded by Udaipurwati Tehsil towards East, Jhunjhunun Tehsil towards North, Piprali Tehsil towards South, Chirawa Tehsil towards North .

Nawalgarh, Udaipurwati, Jhunjhunu, Mandawa are the near by Cities to Kari.

Kari village is a Jat majority and having different caste comprises sc, st, obc, general and others also. Dhayalon Ka bass, Dudiyon Ka bass revenue village of Kari gram Panchayat. There is a Govt SR sec school, PHC, Ayurveda centre, IT centre, four middle schools and many more primary schools are there.

== Census Codes ==
Indian Census Codes associated with Kari village
Type	Name	Census Code
Suburb	Kari	071629
Taluka	Nawalgarh	00491
District	Jhunjhunun	103
State	Rajasthan	08

== Profile ==
Name	Kari
Local name	
Type	Village Panchayat
Villages	Kari Doodiyon Ki Dhani Gusaiyon Ki Dhani Dhyalon Ka Was
Inter Panchayat	Nawalgarh
Block	Nawalgarh
District Panchayat	Jhunjhunu
State	Rajasthan
LGD Code	39514

== Wards ==
No.	Ward Name	Ward No	LGD Code
1	Ward No. 1	1	879596
2	Ward No. 2	2	879598
3	Ward No. 3	3	879600
4	Ward No. 4	4	879604
5	Ward No. 5	5	879611
6	Ward No. 6	6	879612
7	Ward No. 7	7	879614
8	Ward No. 8	8	879617
9	Ward No. 9	9	879619
10	Ward No. 10	10	879620
11	Ward No. 11	11	879621
12	Ward No. 12	12	879622
13	Ward No. 13	13	879624

== Neighborhoods ==
To the north of Kari is Bugala, Ajari, Baragaon, Jhunjhunu, Udawas. To the east of Kari is Jakhal, Sonthali, Titanwar, Gudha Gorji. To the south is Bhorki, Inderpura, Udaipur Shekhawati, Dhamora. To the west is Gusaiyon ki dhani, Jaisingpura, Barwasi, Nawalgarh, Mukundgarh, Sikar, Dundlod.

== Geography ==
Kari is located at 24.8358°N 78.8553°E. It has an average elevation of 386 metres (1266.4 feet) above sea level

== Climate ==
The summers are excruciatingly hot with temperatures reaching up to 40 degrees Celsius. The winters are relatively cooler with the days having an average temperature of 26 degrees Celsius while the nights are as cool as 9 degrees Celsius.

Kari is located in the Shekhawati region of Rajasthan with predominantly hot and arid climate.

== Language ==
- Hindi
- Rajasthani

== Population ==
Kari is a large village with total 517 families residing. The Kari village has population of 2856 of which 1425 are males while 1431 are females as per Population Census 2011.

In Kari village population of children with age 0-6 is 384 which makes up 13.45% of total population of village. Average Sex Ratio of Kari village is 1004 which is higher than Rajasthan state average of 928. Child Sex Ratio for the Kari as per census is 882, lower than Rajasthan average of 888.

Kari village has higher literacy rate compared to Rajasthan. In 2011, literacy rate of Kari village was 73.02% compared to 66.11% of Rajasthan. In Kari Male literacy stands at 87.80% while female literacy rate was 58.59 %The total village population is 5649 (2001 census).

Most of the villagers are Hindus. 10 percent of the villagers are Harijans, 8% are Brahmins and 1% are Muslims. Moond family, Manth, Dhayal, Dhaka, Shivran, Khedar, pujari Rayal, Achara, Doot, Mahala, Dudi, Pachar, Bhaskar, Gilla, Kuri, Godara are the Jat Gotras in the village. The Rathore Rajputs (Jodha Gotra) also live in this village.

=== Kari Data ===
Particulars	Total	Male	Female
Total No. of Houses	517	-	-
Population	2,856	1,425	1,431
Child (0-6)	384	204	180
Schedule Caste	527	268	259
Schedule Tribe	128	68	60
Literacy	73.02 %	87.80 %	58.59 %
Total Workers	981	592	389
Main Worker	813	-	-
Marginal Worker	168	54	114

=== Caste Factor ===
Schedule Caste (SC) constitutes 18.45% while Schedule Tribe (ST) were 4.48% of total population in Kari village.

== Economy ==
1 person IPS officer,60% of the villagers are dependent on agriculture. 25 villagers work in Gulf countries, mostly in Saudi Arabia and 45 villagers work as teachers. Each family either has a member working in armed forces or having worked in armed forces. Many Poddars, Kedias, Patwaris, Kariwals, Pareeks are doing big business and many working in other states of India

There are 50 shops in the village.

In Kari village out of total population, 981 were engaged in work activities. 82.87% of workers describe their work as Main Work (Employment or Earning more than 6 Months) while 17.13% were involved in Marginal activity providing livelihood for less than 6 months. Of 981 workers engaged in Main Work, 425 were cultivators (owner or co-owner) while 57 were Agricultural labourer.

== Post Office ==
postal head office is Jakhal but Kari has a post office in village.

== Local Govt. ==
Assembly constituency : Nawalgarh assembly constituency

Assembly MLA : Vikram Singh Jakhal

Lok Sabha constituency : Jhunjhunu parliamentary constituency

Parliament MP : Brijendra Sing Ola

Sarpanch Name : Sumer Singh

== Commodities Prices ==
Nawalgarh Market / Mandi

== Education ==
There is a government senior secondary school in the village. There is an English medium primary school (sarswati primary school) in the village.Manush Pareek of this village became 1st IPS in 2020. Jai Prakash was selected in Rajasthan Forest Service officer in 90s.
