= Alashna =

Indian village

Coordinates: 31°02′N 77°35′E

Alashna is a small Indian village located in the Block of Chaupal. This rural village comes under the Shimla district of the state of Himachal Pradesh. It falls under the division of Shimla which is the largest city of Himachal of North India.

== Climate ==
The weather of Alashna is same like Chaupal. It is temperate and warm. It receives maximum rainfall in summers and less during winters. The average temperature in winter: −10 °C (14 °F) to 18 °C (64 °F) and in summer: 20 °C (68 °F) to 32 °C (90 °F).

== Demographics ==
The village of Alashna covers an area of 185.62 hectares with the total number of households 65. As per the Census of 2011 by the Government of India, the total numbers of persons were 290 in which 139 were males and 151 were females. The population in the age-group 0-6 was 30 in which 14 were males and 16 were females.

== Literacy rate ==
Alashna Village has a total 205 people who are literate in which 105 were males and 100 are females.

== Language ==
The natives of this village mostly speak Hindi and Pahari.

== Local information ==
The Postal Index Number of Alashna Village is 17211 with Indian Post Office Matal.
