= Khinwasar =

- Village
- Location in Rajasthan, India
- Coordinates: 27.829437°N 75.19043°E
- Country: India
- State: Rajasthan
- District: Sikar

Government
  - Body: Gram panchayat
  - Sarpanch: Ramswaroop Chalka
- Elevation: 424.24 m (1,391.9 ft)

Population (2001)
  - Total: 2,240

Languages
  - Official: Hindi
  - Additional-official: English
- Time zone: UTC+5:30 (IST)
- PIN: 332316
- Telephone code: 91-1573
- ISO 3166 code: RJ-IN
- Vehicle registration: RJ-23
- Nearest city: Nawalgarh
- Distance from Nawalgarh: 07 kilometres (4.3 mi) (land)
- Distance from Laxmangarh: 17 kilometres (11 mi) (land)
- Avg. summer temperature: 46-48 °C
- Avg. winter temperature: 0-1 °C

Khinwasar or Khiwasar is a village in Sikar district of the Indian state of Rajasthan. It is 15 kilometres (9 mi) east of Laxmangarh which is the village's Tehsil too. It was founded in the early 19th century. It has some signs of old habitations.

== Demographics ==
Of 2,240 people, 1,174 are males and 1,066 are females. There are 367 households, making it 6.10 people per household.

== Village government ==
Villages under Khinwasar gram Panchayat are J P Nagar, Poshani, Ramchandra Ka Baas.

== Transportation ==
Khinwasar is connected by a two lane asphalt road to Laxmangarh and Nawalgarh. Nawalgarh Railway station, 7 kilometres (4.3 mi) from Khinwasar is the nearest railway station, which is well connected to Jaipur, Delhi and other cities.

== Games and sports ==
Most of the villagers play Football and Cricket and also host annual football tournaments. Villagers can be seen playing cards in chaupal (village common area).

== Festivals ==
Villagers celebrate all Hindu and Muslim festivals. Some of the major festivals are Holi, Deepawali, Eid etc.

== NREGA scheme ==
National Rural Employment Guaranteed scheme has been implemented in the village. A total of 25 village households worked under the scheme. A complete list can be found from the NREGA website
