= Seth Gyaniram Bansidhar Podar College =

College in Rajasthan, India

- Podar College, Nawalgarh
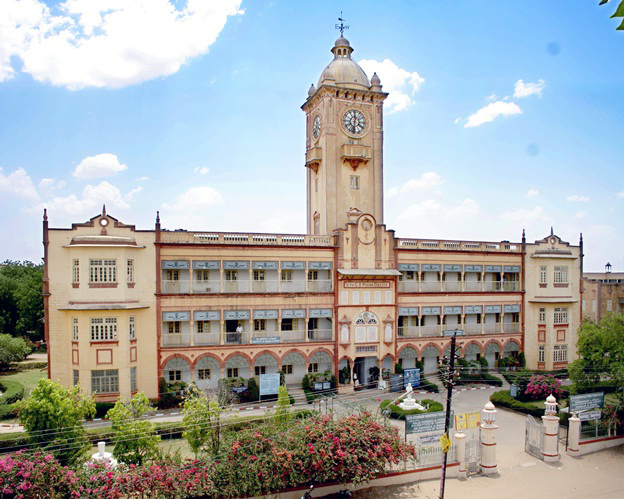
- Main building
- Other name: Podar College
- Motto: Excellence & Growth
- Type: Private
- Established: 1921
- Academic affiliations: University of Rajasthan; Pandit Deendayal Upadhyaya Shekhawati University
- Chairman: Mr.Rajiv Podar
- Principal: Satyendra Singh
- Academic staff: 80
- Students: 2000–2500
- Location: Nawalgarh, Rajasthan, India; 27.8464°N 75.2628°E
- Campus: Urban
- Colors: Light orange
- Website: www.podarcollege.com
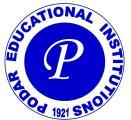

Seth Gyaniram Bansidhar Podar College (Hindi: सेठ ज्ञानीराम बंसीधर पोदार महाविद्यालय) also referred to as Podar College is a private college in the town Nawalgarh of Jhunjhunu district in the Indian state Rajasthan. Its offering education in arts, science and commerce streams at undergraduate and postgraduate levels.

== History ==
Run by the Anandilal Podar Trust, Seth Gyaniram Bansidhar Podar College, Nawalgarh is an educational institution in the Shekhawati region. The college has grown from a Brahmcharyashram established in 1921. Before the formation of University of Rajasthan, the college had been affiliated to Agra University. Mahatma Gandhi as the first Chairman Trustee of the college. The Trust came into being as the result of a benevolent donation by Shri Anandilalji Podar for the uplift of education in the region.

== Faculties ==
1. Faculty of Arts
2. Faculty of Commerce
3. Faculty of Science
4. PIMS (Podar Institute of Management Studies)
