= Bhoodha Ka Bas =

- Village
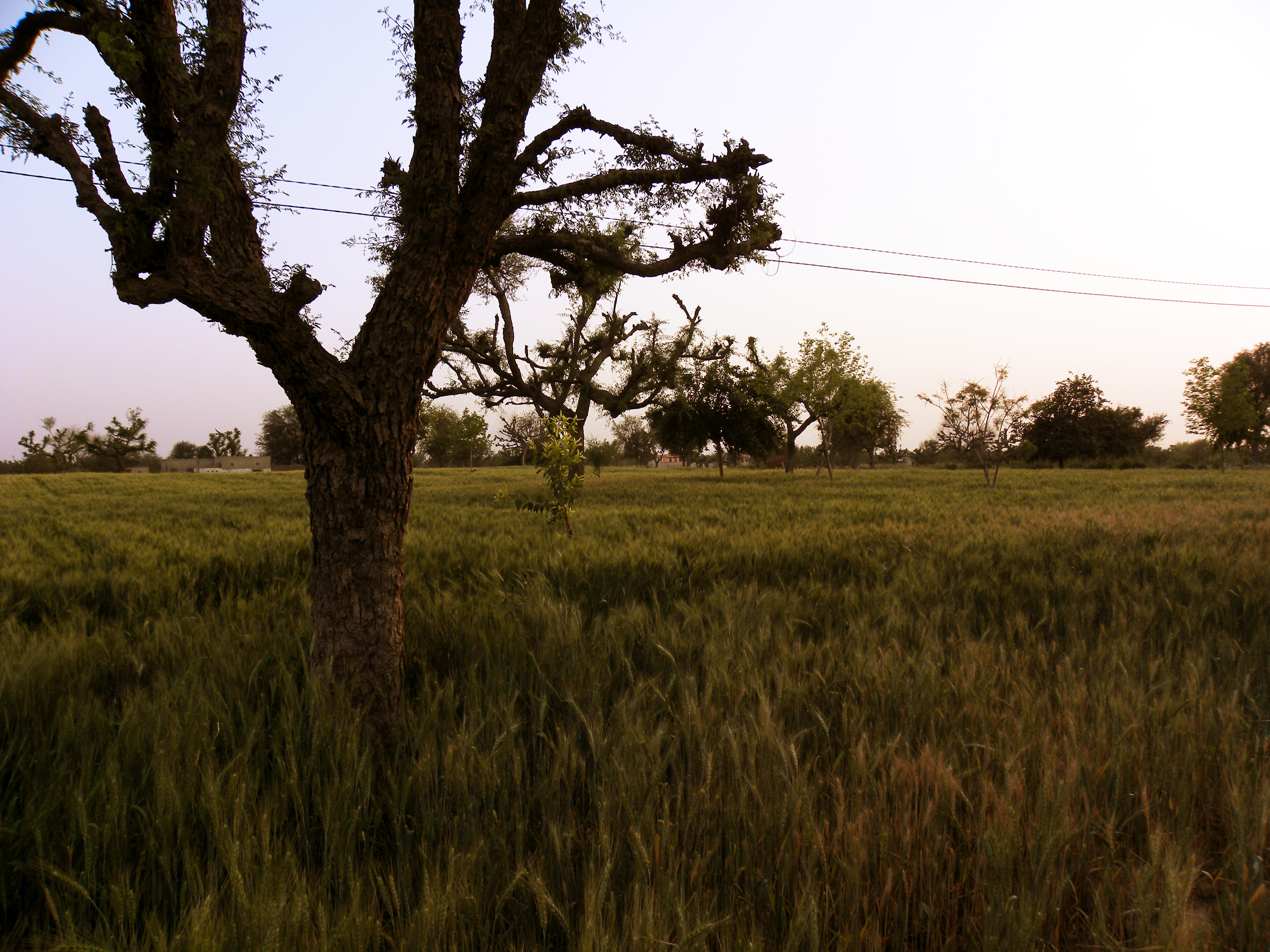
- A Wheat cultivated farm in the village

- Location in Rajasthan, India Bhoodha Ka Bas (India)
- Coordinates: 27.849444°N 75.224722°E
- Country: India
- State: Rajasthan
- District: Sikar

Government
  - Body: Panchayat
  - Sarpanch: Rajendra Prasad Bhaskar (BJP)
- Elevation: 424.24 m (1,391.9 ft)

Population (2011)
  - Total: 317

Languages
  - Official: Hindi
- Time zone: UTC+5:30 (IST)
- PIN: 332316
- Telephone code: 91-1573
- ISO 3166 code: RJ-IN
- Vehicle registration: RJ-23
- Nearest city: Nawalgarh
- Distance from Nawalgarh: 4 kilometres (2.5 mi) (land)
- Distance from Laxmangarh: 22 kilometres (14 mi) (land)
- Avg. summer temperature: 46-48 °C
- Avg. winter temperature: 0-1 °C
- Sex ratio: 1:0.969 ♂/♀
- Literacy: 87.05% 95.83% (male); 77.61% (female)

Bhoodha Ka Bas is a village in the Laxmangarh administrative region of the Sikar district of Indian state Rajasthan. Bhoodha Ka Bas village is separated from the Beerodi Bari village and situated in the north-east side of the Sikar district. Village is situated approximately 22 kilometres (14 mi) east of Laxmangarh town and 4 kilometres (2.5 mi) west of Nawalgarh town.

There are in total 52 families residing in the village. The village has population of 317 of which 161 are males while 156 are females as per 2011 Census of India. Average Sex Ratio of the village is 969 which is higher than Rajasthan state average of 928.

== History ==
The village is not new but until 2008 it was known as Malio Ki Dhani and it was an integral part of the village Beerodi Bari. In year 2008 it was declared as a revenue village by the district collector of Sikar district and its new name Bhoodha Ka Bas came into the existence. Later it was also added into government records.

== Government ==
Village falls under Beerodi Bari panchayat samiti and current sarpanch is Rajendra Prasad Bhaskar. There are total 11 wards in the Beerodi Bari panchayat samiti and Bhoodha Ka Bas comes under ward number 1 and 2 (partially) of the panchayat samiti.

== Economy ==
Most of the people of the village are engaged in the farming activities. Agriculture mainly dependent on the monsoon rains although today many farmers also using artesian wells for irrigation of their crops. Some people doing their own business, few peoples are employed as government teacher or in other state government jobs, there are also some peoples those served in Indian armed forces. Village also have few engineers and doctors as well.

== Geography and climate ==
=== Geography ===
Village is located at 27.849444°N 75.224722°E.

=== Climate ===
Village has a hot summer, scanty rainfall, a chilly winter season and a general dryness of the air, except in the brief monsoon season. The average maximum and minimum temperatures are 28 - 30 and 15 - 16 degrees Celsius, respectively.

== Transportation ==
Village is connected by gravel road to the Beerodi Bari village and Nawalgarh town. The Nearest railway station to the village is Nawalgarh railway station, which is situated on the Sikar-Loharu broad gauge line section. Nawalgarh railway station is approximately 4 kilometres (2.5 mi) far away from the village and well connected from Jaipur, Delhi and other cities. Camel carts and bullock carts were formerly the chief means of transportation and are being replaced these days by bicycles, motorcycle and other four wheeler automobiles. Few villagers also prefer walk to Nawalgarh and other surrounding places of the village due to their proximity. In the rainy season, womenfolk can be seen bringing grass on their heads for cows and buffaloes.

== Education ==
Today young generation of the village claim to be fully literate all children now go to surrounding town Nawalgarh to attend schools, colleges and coaching's. Village has one government primary school. However still many old women's remain illiterate, although literacy rate is improving year by year. Some students of the village studied at various pioneering engineering and medical institutes. Besides this, other careers such as teaching, nursing, and defense forces are also popular among the young generation of the village.

== Literacy rate ==
The overall literacy rate of the village is higher compared to the Rajasthan state. In the year 2011, literacy rate of the village was 87.05% compared to 66.11% of Rajasthan. Village has 95.83% male and 77.61% female literacy rate.

== Religion, society and culture ==
=== Religion ===
All people of the village are hindu and follow Hindu rituals. Moreover, entire population of the village belongs to Kamma gotra, which belongs to mali caste.

=== Society and culture ===
Village society is governed solely by hindu rituals although the younger generation has been affected by western cultural influences. Parda, the practice of using veils to cover the face and other parts of the body is discouraged these days.

== Sports, entertainment and festivals ==
=== Sports ===
Most of the children's and young generation of the village play cricket, volleyball and football. Village have its own playground to play these sports.

=== Entertainment ===
Folk songs are sung by women's during weddings and on other social occasions. Menfolk sing dhamaal (traditional Holi songs). Many villagers own Computers, TV's as well as radios and satellite dishes. The sound of popular Hindi music emanating from stereos and other devices is heard from different houses during the afternoon and evening.

=== Festivals ===
Villagers celebrate all major hindu festivals. Some major festivals which are celebrated by the villagers are a few Holi, Deepawali, Makar Sankranti, Raksha Bandhan, Sawan, Teej, Gangaur and Gauga Peer.

== Gallery ==
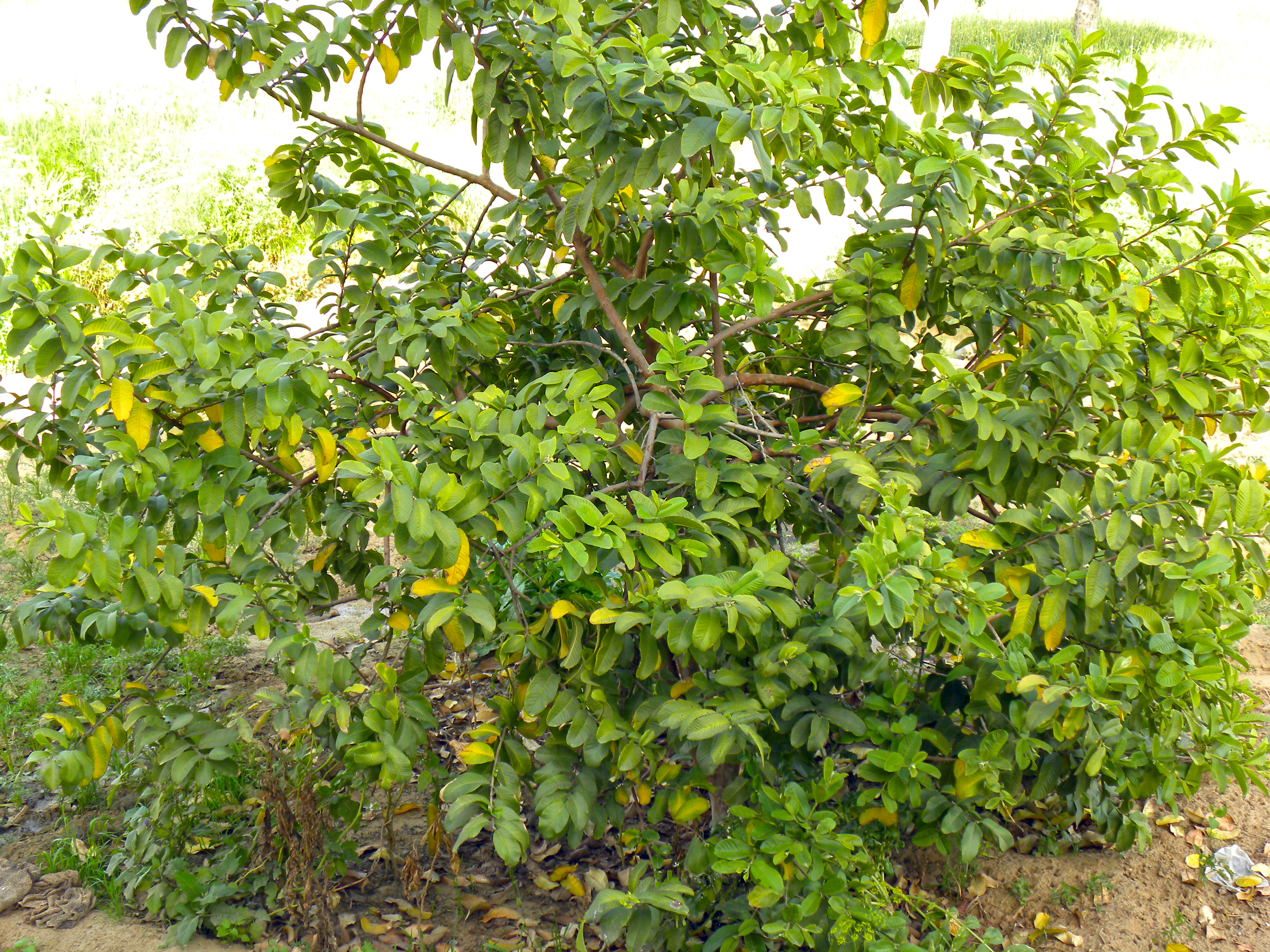
Guava tree in village farm

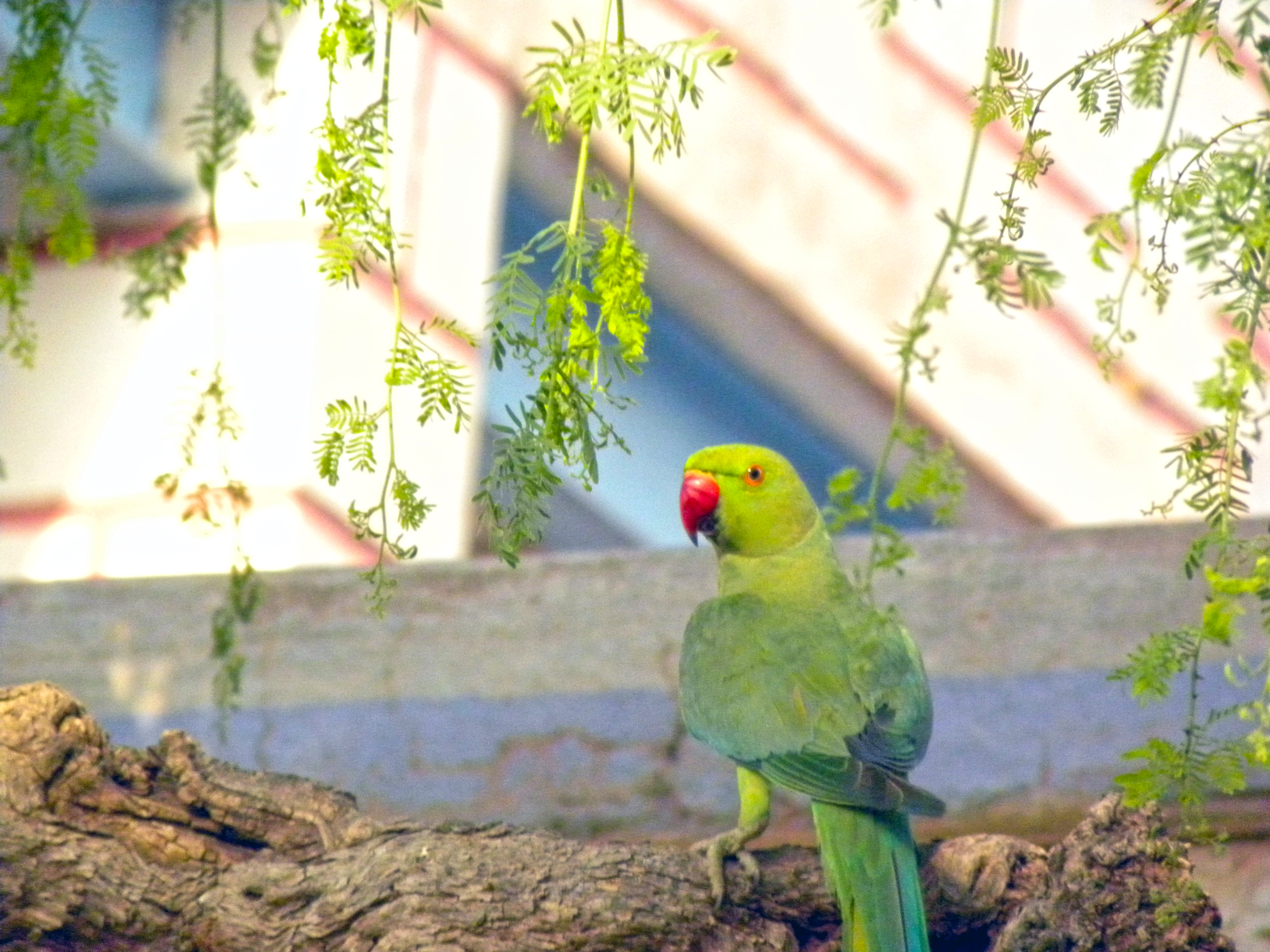
Parrot in village

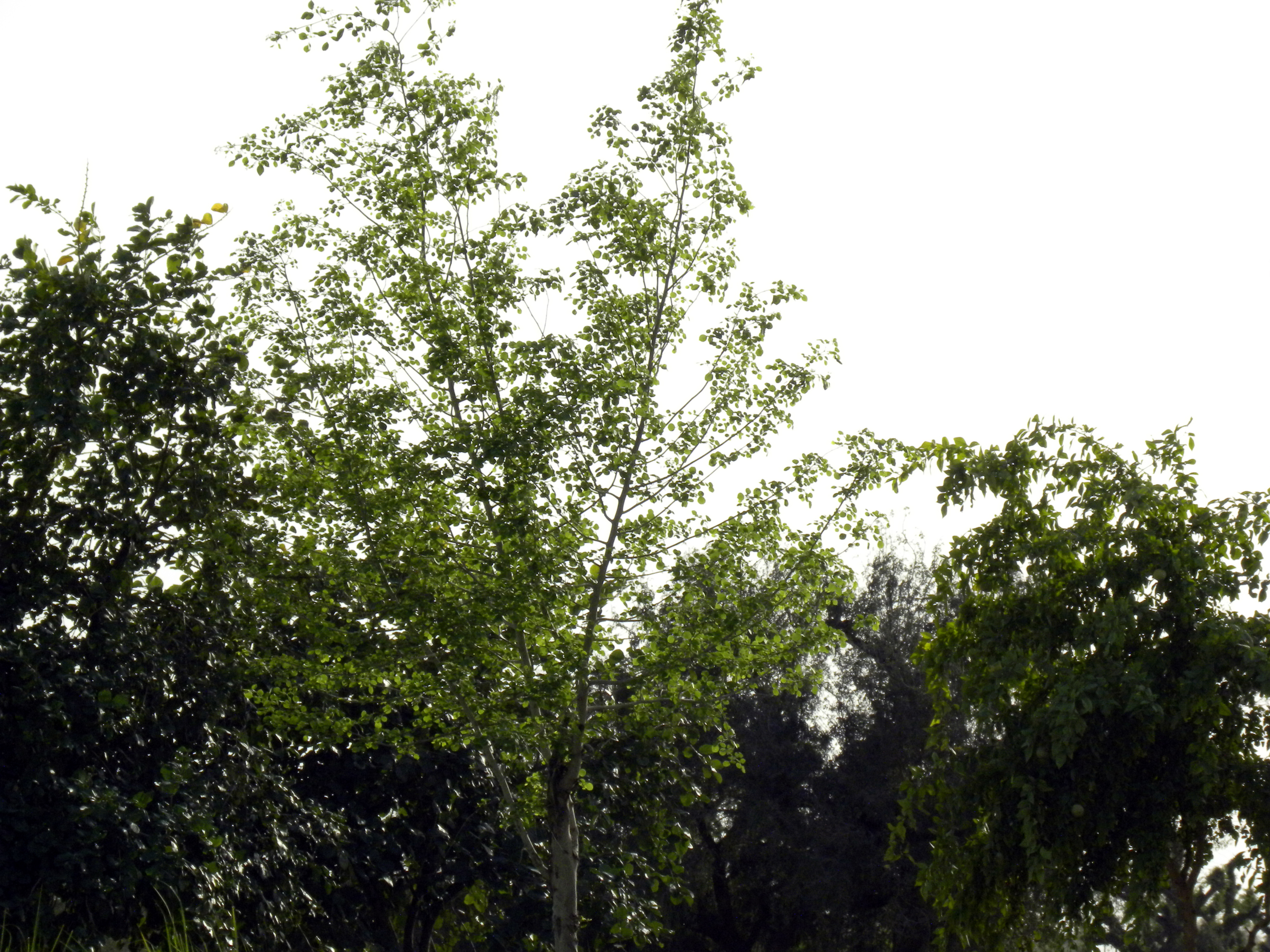
Dalbergia sissoo tree in village

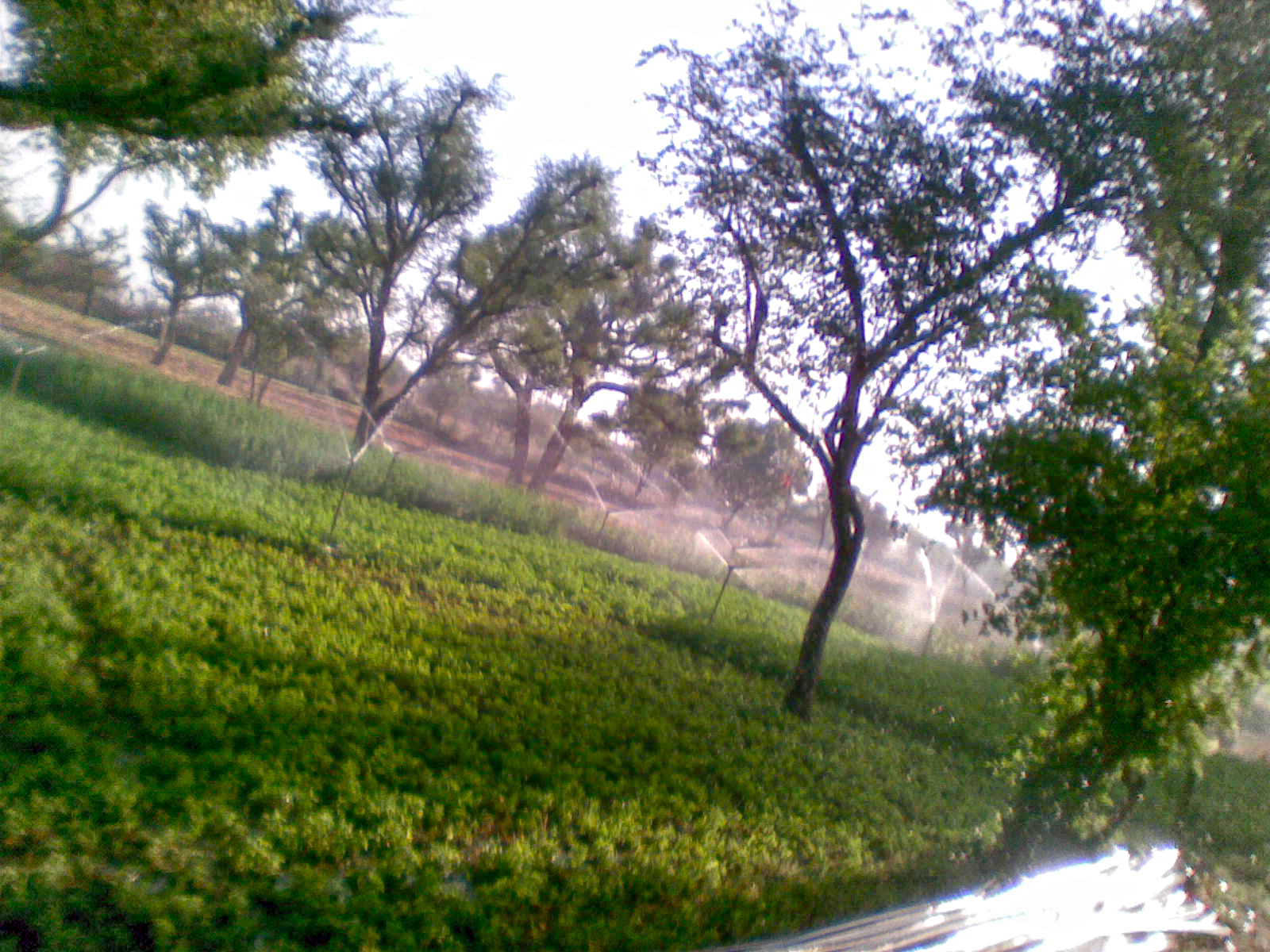
Irrigation Sprinkler in village farm

== See also ==
- Sikar district
- Laxmangarh
