= Pilania =

Pilania is a surname. Notable people with the surname include:

- Naveen Pilania (born 1966), Indian politician
- Gyan Prakash Pilania (1932–2024), Indian politician from Rajasthan
- Priyanka Pilaniya, Indian kabaddi player and gold medalist in the 2014 and 2022 Asian Games
