= Chaupal (public space) =

Community spaces in North India and Pakistan

A Chaupal (Hindustani: चौपाल or چوپال), or chopal, is a community building or space in the rural areas of North India and Pakistan. It is the hub of community life in villages, especially for male inhabitants. In smaller villages, a chaupal can be a simple raised platform that is shaded by a large tree, typically a neem, banyan or pipal fig tree. In larger villages, the chaupal may be an elaborate structure that also doubles as a community guesthouse (or mehmaan khana).

Indian and Pakistani panchayats (village administrative bodies) usually function and hold hearings in the village chaupal. Indian villages have a strong social norm of village exogamy, and the chaupal is often also the site where the groom's party are received and hosted when "a daughter of the village" is married.

Chaupals are constructed and maintained using community funds, sometimes collected in the village using community donations (known as चन्दा, چندا, chanda).

== The notion of chaupal in popular culture ==
Although chaupals are fundamentally a feature of rural life, in the popular perception a chaupal is any place where people "sit and discuss their problems, celebrate their pleasures, share the pains of an individual, family or a particular group, sort out their disputes." It is "a sacred place of secular nature" that "guarantees freedom of speech and expression to everybody." Television talk shows, online websites and forums affiliated with the region sometimes attempt to mirror that atmosphere of free conversation and social engagement by including the term "chaupal" in their names.
