= Dundlod =

Dundlod Shivgarh
- town
- Location in Rajasthan, India Dundlod (India)
- Coordinates: 27.9000°N 75.2165°E
- Country: India
- State: Rajasthan
- District: Jhunjhunu
- Elevation: 354 m (1,161 ft)

Languages
  - Official: Hindi
- Time zone: UTC+5:30 (IST)
- PIN: 333 702
- Telephone code: +91-1594 / 01594
- Vehicle registration: RJ-18
- Nearest city: Nawalgarh
- Distance from Bidsar (बीदसर): 6 kilometres (3.7 mi) (land)
- Avg. summer temperature: 46–48 °C (115–118 °F)
- Avg. winter temperature: 0–1 °C (32–34 °F)

Dundlod (formerly Shivgarh) is a town in Nawalgarh tehsil Jhunjhunu district in the Shekhawati region of Rajasthan in India, about seven kilometers north of Nawalgarh, Rajasthan.

== Geography ==
Dundlod has an average elevation of 354 metres (1164 feet).
