= Laxmangarh =

- city
- Location in Rajasthan, India
- Coordinates: 27.8225°N 75.025278°E
- Country: India
- State: Rajasthan
- District: Sikar
- Founder: Rao Raja laxman Singh

Government
  - Type: Democracy
- Elevation: 424.24 m (1,391.9 ft)

Population (2011)
  - Total: 90,992

Languages
  - Official: Hindi
- Time zone: UTC+5:30 (IST)
- PIN: 332311
- Telephone code: 91-1573
- Vehicle registration: RJ-23

Laxmangarh is a town in the Sikar district of Rajasthan state in India.

== History ==
Laxmangarh was founded by Rao Raja Laxman Singh of Sikar in 1807. He also built a fort there, now called Laxmangarh Fort and there is also a clock tower here, right in the middle of the market.

== Geography ==
Laxmangarh is located at 27.8225°N 75.025278°E. It has an average elevation of 222 metres (728 ft).
