= Nawalgarh, Rajasthan =

City in Rajasthan, India

Nawalgarh
- City
- Location in Rajasthan, India Nawalgarh (India)
- Coordinates: 27.845755°N 75.268021°E
- Country: India
- State: Rajasthan
- District: Jhunjhunu
- Founder: Maharaja Nawal Singh

Government
  - Body: Nagar palika
- Elevation: 379 m (1,243 ft)

Population (2011)
  - Total: 95,346

Languages
  - Official: Hindi
- Time zone: UTC+5:30 (IST)
- PIN: 333042
- Telephone code: 91-1594
- ISO 3166 code: RJ-IN
- Vehicle registration: RJ-18
- Nearest city: Sikar and Jhunjhunu
- Distance from Sikar: 30 kilometres (19 mi) (land)
- Distance from Jhunjhunu: 39 kilometres (24 mi) (land)
- Avg. summer temperature: 46-48 °C
- Avg. winter temperature: 25-30 °C

Nawalgarh is a heritage city in the Jhunjhunu district of the Shekhawati region of the Indian state of Rajasthan, 30.5 km from Sikar and 39.2 km from Jhunjhunu.

== History ==
Thakur Nawal Singh Ji Bahadur founded Nawalgarh in 1737 AD at the village site of Rohili, and his descendants rules there till abolition of Jagirs in Rajasthan. Many business families of Marwari community like Jaipuria, Mansingka, Padias, Birlas, Goenka, Jiwrajka, Khaitan, Nemani, Kariwal, Dharnidharka, Somani, Chhawchharia, Ganeriwala, Murarka, Poddar, Seksaria have their origins from Nawalgarh.

== Demographics ==
As of 2011 India census, Nawalgarh had a population of 95,346. Males constitute 52% of the population and females 48%. Nawalgarh has an average literacy rate of 57%, lower than the national average of 59.5%: male literacy is 68%, and female literacy is 46%. In Nawalgarh, 17% of the population is under 20 years of age.

== Geography ==
Nawalgarh is located at 27.85°N 75.27°E. It has an average elevation of 379 metres (1243 feet).

== Pulwama attack memorial ==
On 16 Feb 2019, a 300 square yard piece of land was donated for a memorial to the 2019 Pulwama attack.

== Education ==
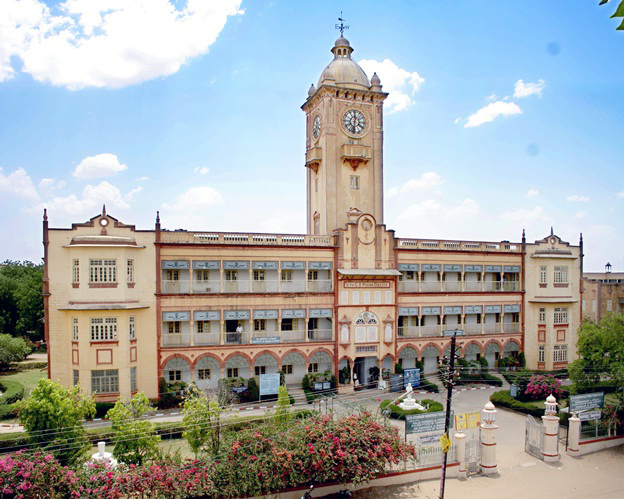
Seth Gyaniram Bansidhar Podar College

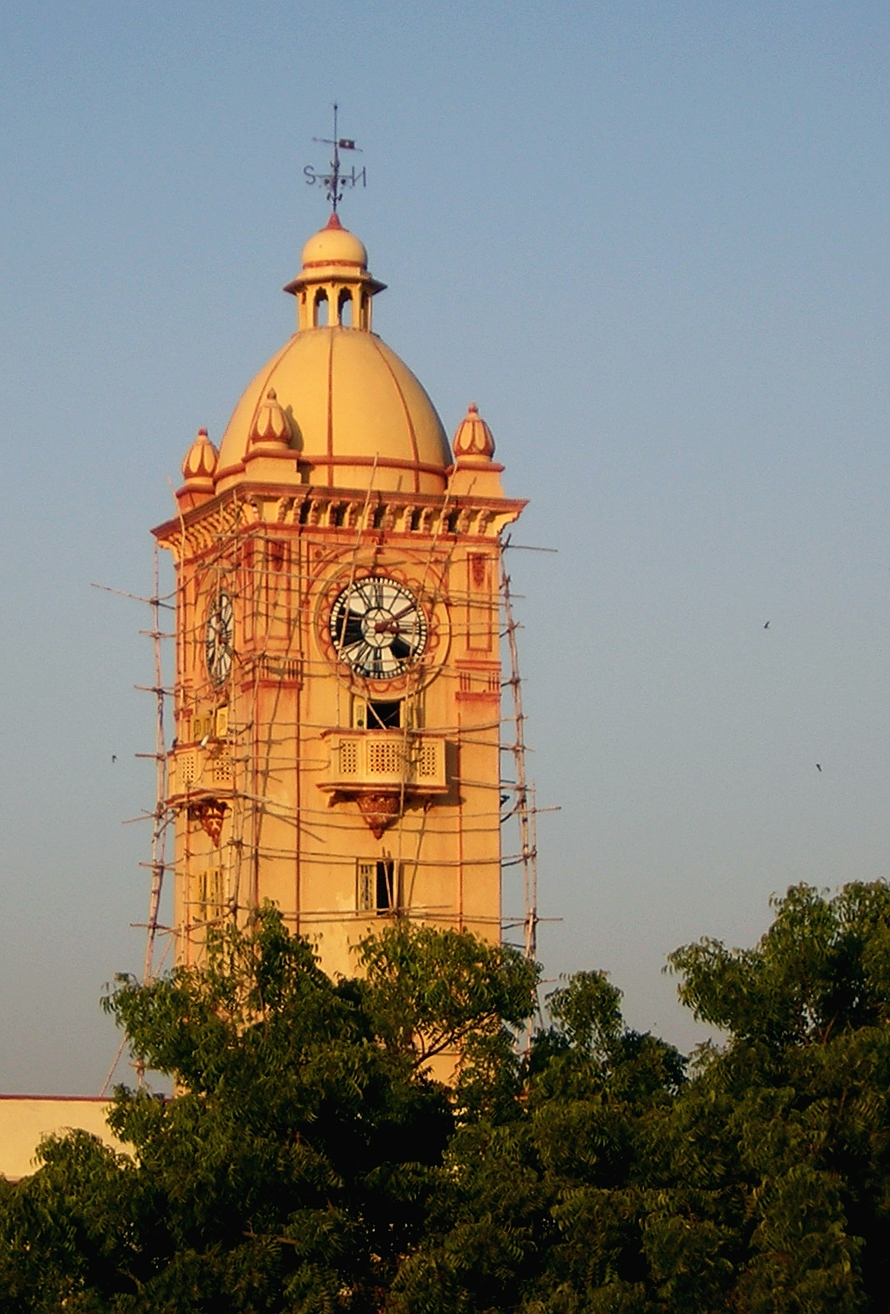
Podar College Tower, Nawalgarh

Shekhawati region is known for education in Rajasthan. Sikar and Jhunjhunu cities are an important education hubs in the entire region. Nawalgarh can also be considered as an important education hubs in this region. '‘Asha Ka Jharna’' is a voluntary non-profit organization working for the cause of disability since 1997 running three special schools for mentally challenged and hearing impaired children. Seth Gyaniram Bansidhar Podar College and Shri Nawalgarh Mahila Mahavidyalaya are the most important higher educational institutions in the city. Apart from these there are few recently opened institutes also offering higher education like Gyan Vihar College. For school education city have some very good schools offering education in Hindi as well as English as a medium of instruction. Here one of the best known school is Jyoti Bal VidyaPeeth Secondary School Nawalgarh and others are Saraswati Senior Secondary School Balwantpura, Subodh Public School, Shri Nawalgarh Senior Secondary School, Prerana Senior Secondary School, Shri Seksaria Saraswati Girls Senior Secondary School, GEMS Gurukul International School, New Indian Senior Secondary School, Podar Matushri Senior Secondary School, Godavaribai Ramdev Podar Senior Secondary School, Gurukripa Public School Ghoriwara Balaji, Gautam Balika Senior Secondary School, Shekhawati Public School, Dundlod Vidyapeeth, Dundlod and Dundlod Public school (in Dundlod), Mother Teresa Senior Secondary School, Vidhya Bharti Shikshan Sansthan are few names in the list. 12th RBSE 2025 result send topper from Gurukripa Ghoriwara Kritika.

Nawalgarh also has a science park that has a planetarium and galleries showcasing dinosaur models, nuclear science and fun science for students.

== Connectivity ==
=== Rail ===
Nawalgarh is connected through broad gauge railway line and situated on the Sikar-Loharu railway line section. The broad gauge section passes through the western corner of the city where the main city railway station situated. Now the city has direct connectivity through broad gauge line section to Delhi via Loharu and to Kota, Jaipur via Sikar and Ringus.

=== Road ===
Nawalgarh city starts from Ghoomchakkar on the state highway 8. Recently Nawalgarh got its own bus depot which is situated on the north-west side of the city along with state highway 8. State Highway-8 passes through center of city which connects city to Sikar and Jhunjhunu. Buses for all the major cities of Rajasthan like Jaipur, Ajmer, Kota, Bikaner, Jodhpur and Delhi and other cities also operated from here. All the buses operated from Sikar and Jhunjhunu depot passes through Nawalgarh as well as other depot buses also passes through Nawalgarh.

Another important addition to the list is the Roadways Bus Terminal in the Memory of Late Sh. Radheshyam R Morarka, in Nawalgarh, which was inaugurated on 21 April 2011 by Rajasthan Minister of Transport and Sanskrit Education, Sh. Brij Kishor Sharma in the presence of Minister of State for Health, and Science & technology Dr. Rajkumar Sharma. The project, constructed under the ‘Development of Tourist Circuit under the Integrated Scheme’ of the central government, has cost about Rs. 1.05 crore to Sewajyoti. Objective behind the development of this complex is important for another reason. Nawalgarh is an important tourist destination and it was important to provide basic transport infrastructure to the tourists visiting the city and the area. The complex has also resulted in generation of new employment opportunities for local youth.

Prior to this bus terminal's development, passengers waiting for buses used to suffer under the broad sunlight. There were no necessary facilities available for the passengers and drivers. However, now Nawalgarh boasts of a well planned bus terminal with all important amenities and facilities such as a canteen, bathroom, resting place, book shops, communication booths etc. The terminal building is surrounded by green lush trees which gives the entire area an attractive look. Construction of bus terminal has also help manage the traffic in the city.

=== Air ===
The nearest airport to Nawalgarh city, Jaipur International Airport, is 154 km (96 mi) away which operate daily flights to Delhi, Mumbai, Hyderabad, Bangalore, Pune, Indore, Ahmedabad, Chennai, Guwahati, Kolkata, Udaipur, Dubai, Sharjah, Muscat. Recently another airport at Kishangarh has started operations is 184 km (114 mi) away from Nawalgarh.

== Gallery ==
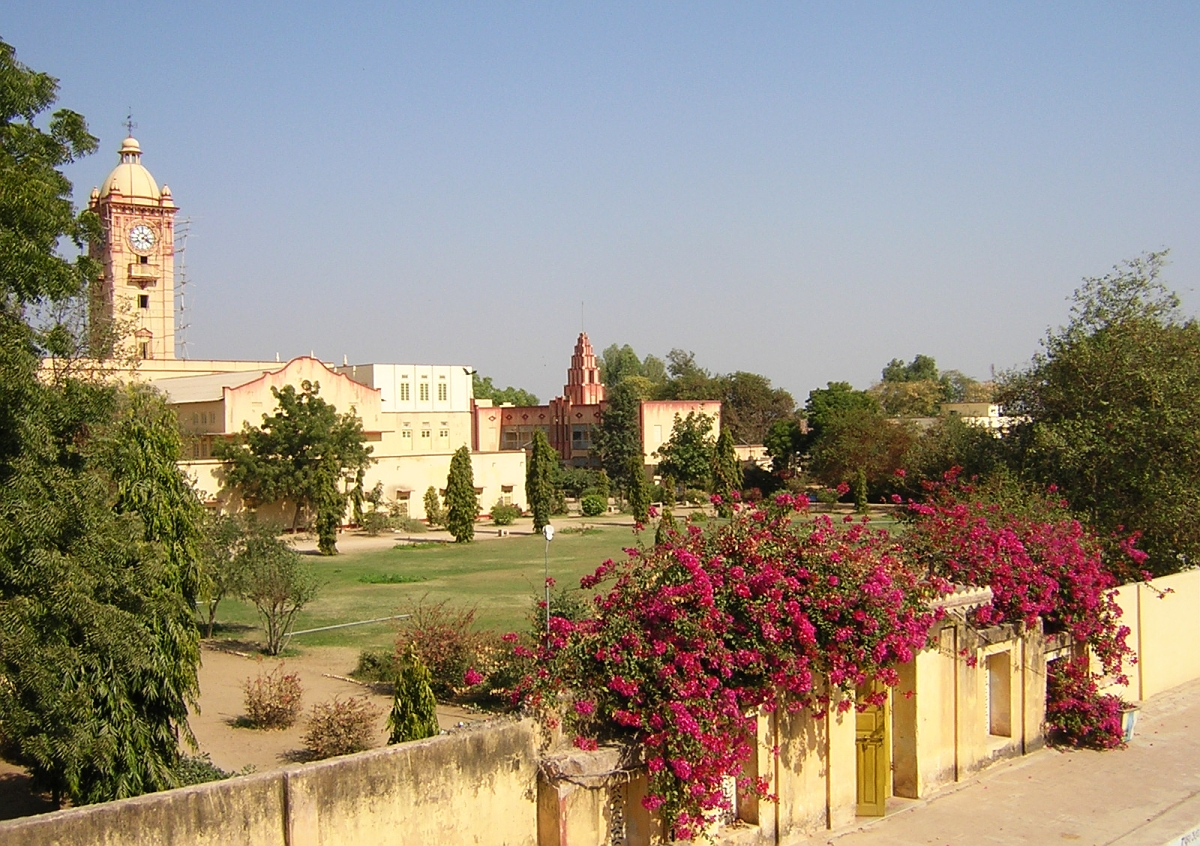
Seth GB Podar College

== See also ==
- Shekhawati
