= Chandpura =

Chandpura may refer to:

- Chandpura, Bhopal, a village in Madhya Pradesh, India
- Chandpura, Sikar, a village in Rajasthan, India
