= Chandpura, Bhopal =

Chandpura
- Village
- Location within Madhya Pradesh Location within India
- Coordinates: 23.8543935°N 77.2972601°E
- Country: India
- State: Madhya Pradesh
- District: Bhopal
- Tehsil: Berasia
- Elevation: 470 m (1,540 ft)

Population (2011)
  - Total: 557
- Time zone: UTC+5:30 (IST)
- ISO 3166 code: MP-IN
- 2011 census code: 482327

Chandpura is a village in the Bhopal district of Madhya Pradesh, India. It is located in the Berasia tehsil.

== Demographics ==
According to the 2011 census of India, Chandpura has 124 households. The effective literacy rate (i.e. the literacy rate of population excluding children aged 6 and below) is 42.49%.

Demographics (2011 Census)
	Total	Male	Female
Population	557	301	256
Children aged below 6 years	91	48	43
Scheduled caste	9	4	5
Scheduled tribe	0	0	0
Literates	198	123	75
Workers (all)	329	190	139
Main workers (total)	296	179	117
Main workers: Cultivators	284	173	111
Main workers: Agricultural labourers	11	6	5
Main workers: Household industry workers	0	0	0
Main workers: Other	1	0	1
Marginal workers (total)	33	11	22
Marginal workers: Cultivators	28	8	20
Marginal workers: Agricultural labourers	5	3	2
Marginal workers: Household industry workers	0	0	0
Marginal workers: Others	0	0	0
Non-workers	228	111	117
