= Chandpura, Sikar =

Chandpura chanpura
- village
- Location in Rajasthan, India Chandpura (India)
- Coordinates: 27.566550°N 75.140756°E
- Country: India
- State: Rajasthan
- District: Sikar
- Elevation: 486 m (1,594 ft)

Languages
  - Official: Hindi
- Time zone: UTC+5:30 (IST)
- PIN: 332021
- Telephone code: 01572

Chandpura is a village located in Sikar district of Rajasthan. It is 3 km away from Sikar. SH 21 passes from Chandpura. The languages Hindi and Marwari are spoken here.
