= Samrawata =

- Village
- Location within Rajasthan Location within India
- Coordinates: 26°16′45″N 75°53′34″E
- Country: India
- State: Rajasthan
- District: Tonk

Population (2011)
  - Total: 1,063

Demographics
  - Literacy: 66.12%
  - Sex ratio: 908

Samrawata is a medium size village located in Uniara Tehsil of Tonk district, Rajasthan with total 268 families residing. In 2011, the Samrawata village had a population of 1,063, of which 553 were males while 510 were females.
