= Kanhaiya Lal Choudhary =

Indian politician

Cabinet Minister, Government of Rajasthan
- Incumbent
- Assumed office 30 December 2023
- Governor: Kalraj Mishra; Haribhau Bagade
- Chief Minister: Bhajan Lal Sharma
- Ministry and Departments: List: Public Health Engineering Department (P.H.E.D.); Ground Water
- Preceded by: Mahesh Joshi

Member of Rajasthan Legislative Assembly
- Incumbent
- Assumed office 2013
- Preceded by: Ranveer Pahalwan
- Constituency: Malpura

Personal details
- Born: Kalyanpura Jatan, Todaraisingh, Tonk district, Rajasthan, India
- Party: Bharatiya Janata Party
- Spouse: Radha Choudhary
- Children: 5
- Education: Civ.Eng.
- Occupation: Politician
- Profession: Agriculture

Kanhaiya Lal Choudhary is an Indian politician currently serving as a Cabinet Minister in the Government of Rajasthan, holding the portfolio of Public Health Engineering and Ground Water under the Bhajan Lal Sharma ministry. He is a three-time elected member of the Rajasthan Legislative Assembly from the Malpura Assembly constituency as a representative of the Bharatiya Janata Party (BJP).

== Political career ==
Choudhary was first elected to the Rajasthan Legislative Assembly in 2013 and subsequently re-elected in year 2018 and 2023 from the Malpura constituency. In the 2023 Rajasthan Legislative Assembly election, he defeated Indian National Congress (INC) candidate Ghasi Lal Choudhary by a margin of 16,189 votes.

On 30 December 2023, Choudhary was sworn in as a Cabinet Minister in the presence of Governor Kalraj Mishra, Deputy Chief Ministers Diya Kumari and Prem Chand Bairwa.

== Electoral performance ==
Rajasthan Legislative Assembly election results for Malpura
Year	Party	Opponent (Main)	Opponent Party	Votes secured	Vote share (%)	Result
2013	BJP	Rambilas Choudhary	INC	76,799	49.40%	Elected
2018	BJP	Ranveer Pahalwan	RLD	93,237	52.10%	Elected
2023	BJP	Ghasi Lal Choudhary	INC	85,915	41.22%	Elected
