= Central Sheep and Wool Research Institute =

Agricultural research center in Rajasthan, India

Central Sheep and Wool Research Institute (CSWRI)
- Other name: CSWRI
- Type: Registered Society
- Established: 1962
- Academic affiliations: Indian Council of Agricultural Research
- Officer in charge: Arun Kumar Tomar
- Location: Malpura, Rajasthan, India; 26.28°N 75.38°E
- Campus: Avikanagar
- Website: CSWRI

The ICAR-Central Sheep and Wool Research Institute (ICAR-CSWRI) is an Indian Council of Agricultural Research subsidiary commissioned for research, training and extension activities related to sheep and rabbits. The institute is an autonomous body and is sponsored by the Department of Agricultural Research and Education (DARE), Ministry of Agriculture, Government of India. It is situated in Avikanagar, Malpura, in Rajasthan, India. It works in close liaison with the other ICAR institutes, Central Wool Development Board, Sheep and Wool Marketing Federation, the Department of Biotechnology (GOI), Small Entrepreneurs, NGOs, State Animal Husbandry and Khadi gram and Cottage industries.

== Profile ==
The Central Sheep and Wool Research Institute was established in 1962 at Malpura, presently known as Avikanagar in Rajasthan, India, with a campus covering an area of 1510 hectares and with the principal objective to enhance the productivity of sheep and rabbit through scientific methods by developing and applying new technologies. The activities of the Institute are spread across three regional centres:

The North Temperate Regional Station (NTRS): NTRS was established in 1963 at Garsa, Kullu in Himachal Pradesh and is engaged in research work on high quality germplasm of Gaddi Synthetic for improvement of sheep for fine wool production.

The Southern Regional Research Centre (SRRC): SRRC was established in 1965 and is located at Mannavanur, app 35 km from Kodaikanal in Tamil Nadu. It is engaged in research on fine wool sheep and broiler rabbits.

Arid Region Campus (ARC): ARC was established in 1974 at Bikaner in Rajasthan with a land area of 636 hectares and has rearing facilities for Magra and Marwari sheep.

== Mandate ==
The mandate of the Central Sheep and Wool Research Institute is to engage in basic and applied research on sheep and rabbit production, health, utilization, training and transfer of technologies to beneficiaries.

The objectives of the Institute are:

- To undertake basic and applied research on all aspects of sheep and rabbit production.
- To develop, update and standardize meat, fibre and pelt technologies.
- To impart training on sheep and rabbit production and utilization.
- To transfer improved technologies on sheep and rabbit production to farmers, rural artisans and development workers.
- To provide referral and consultancy services on production and product technologies of sheep and rabbits.

== Infrastructure ==
The institute is equipped with research laboratories attending to Animal Genetics, Physiology, Reproduction, Biochemistry, Animal Health, Animal Nutrition and Animal climatic chamber. It has a farm area measuring 1591 hectares, cenchrus pasture land of 175 hectares and forest and ravine land extending to 522 hectares. The other infrastructural facilities include administrative building, library building, residential complex, guest house, auditorium, conference hall, committee room, Human dispensary and Kendriya Vidyalaya project school. An Agriculture Knowledge Management Unit (AKMU) operates at the institute.

The Institute rears about 3500 sheep of different breeds, 600 goat of Sirohi breeds and 600 rabbit breeds.

== Departments ==
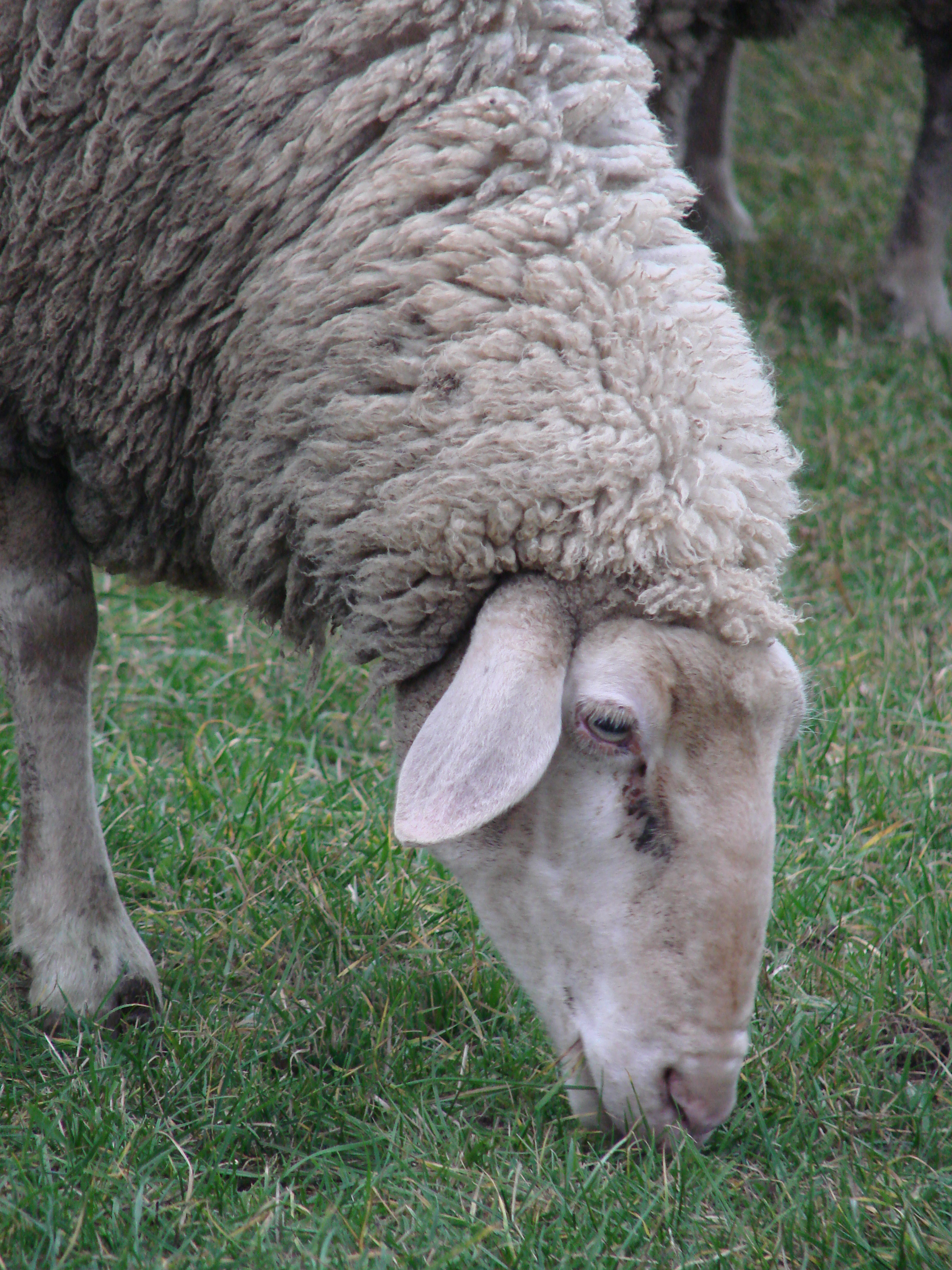

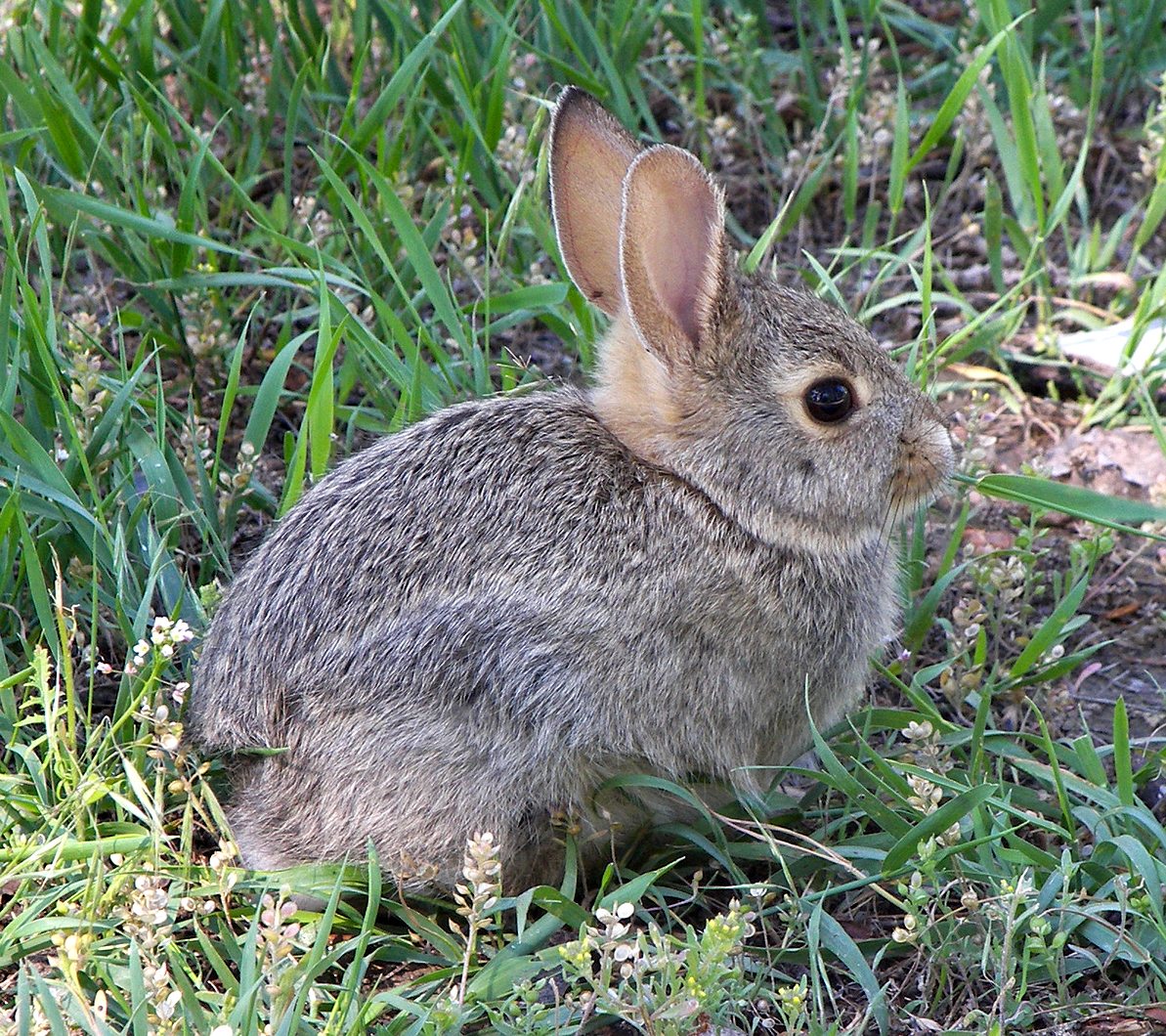

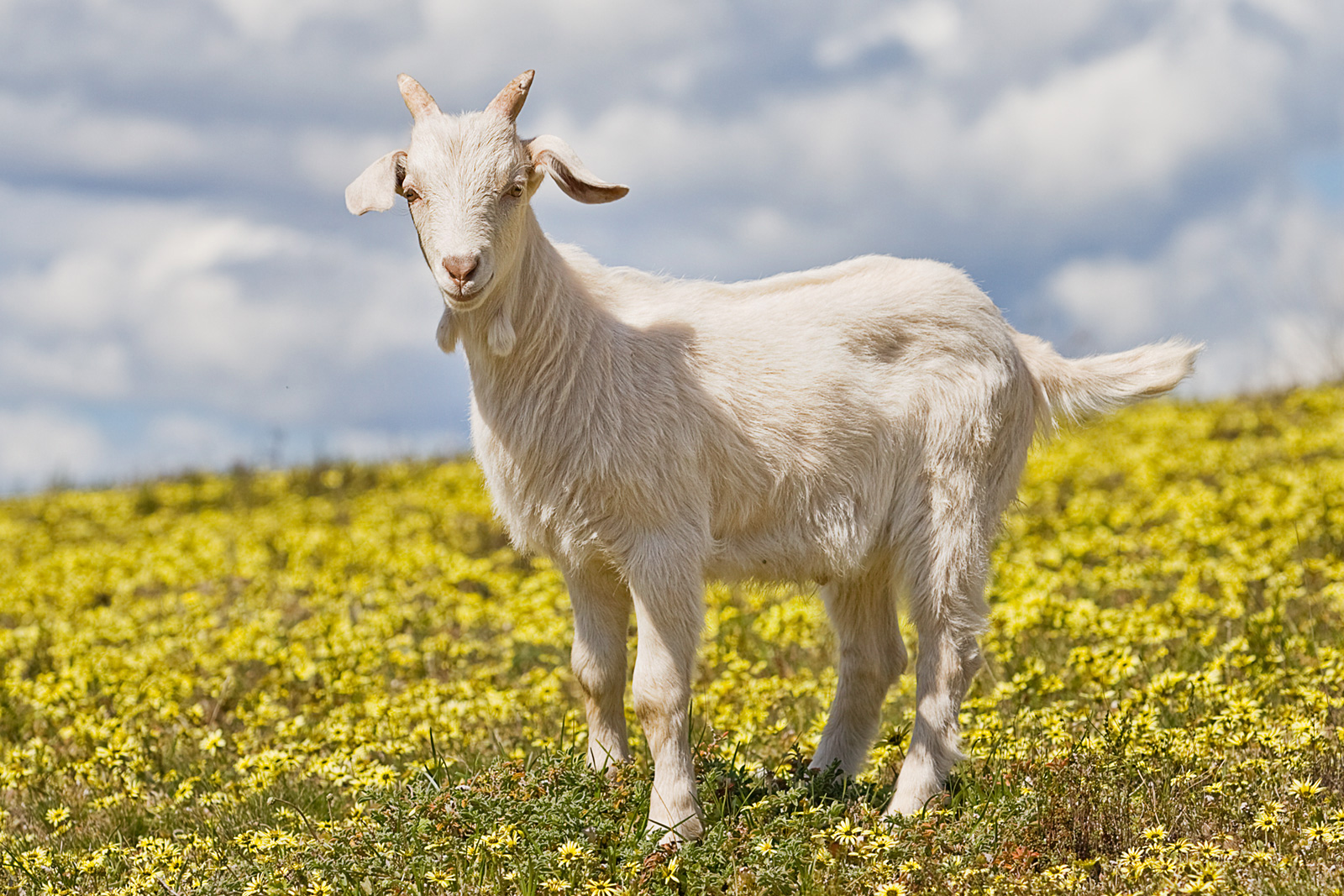

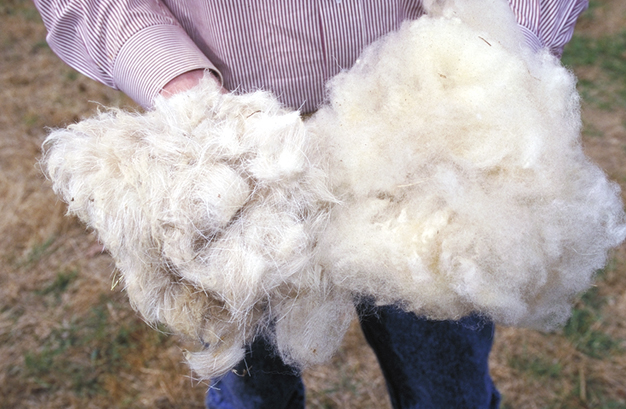
Long and short hair wool

CSWRI is departmentalised into six divisions, each attending to a specific set of activities.

=== Division of Animal Genetics and Breeding ===
Division of Animal Genetics and Breeding was started in 1966 under the name Sheep Genetic Section with a mandate to conduct research on improvement of indigenous breeds of sheep for wool and meat. It was renamed as Division of Animal Genetics and Breeding in 1975. Animal Genetics and Breeding Division carried out pioneer work in the field of crossbreeding for improving the production of mutton, carpet wool, apparel wool and pelt. Various crosses like Avikalin, Bharat Merino, Avimaans, Indian Karakul, Awassi X Malpura and Avivastra were developed at this division. Research was also carried out with indigenous goats (Marwari, Sirohi and Kutchi) to evolve milk and meat producing goats. The biochemical polymorphic studies were undertaken to study the inheritance of various blood constituents and to determine the possible association of these biochemical parameters with economic traits. Cytogenetic studies were initiated in 1982. In 1997, Garole, a prolific microsheep of West Bengal was introduced for increasing prolificacy of Malpura sheep. Marker Assisted Selection (MAS) for prolificacy has been practically used in the routine breeding programme. In 2008, Patanwadi inheritance was introduced into prolificacy project to improve the milk yield and mothering ability. Three breed prolific cross was produced in 2009 and strengthening of prolific flock is in progress. Recently study on understanding the genetic basis of immune response variability in sheep has been initiated. Stalwarts like Dr. M V Krishna Rao, Dr. O N Singh, Dr. R M Acharya, Dr. R Nagercenkar, Dr. A L Chaudhary, Dr. R N Singh, Dr. C L Arora, Dr. S D J Bohra, Dr. B U Khan, Dr. V K Singh and Dr. A L Arora had shaped the development and progress of this division. At present Dr. Arun Kumar is head of the division.

=== Division of Animal Nutrition ===
The division had its origin in 1965 under the name, the Sheep Nutrition Section and was upgraded to cover all aspects of animal nutrition including grass land and forage agronomy. The division is mandated to:

- Evaluate various types of feed resources- pasture (grasses, legumes), top feed resources, agro-industrial by-products and non-conventional feeds.
- Determine nutritional requirements for various production functions in sheep and rabbits.
- Develop feeding strategies for sheep, goat and rabbit production.
- Identify and reduce the adverse effect of various anti-nutritional factors in the feed.
- Improve low grade roughages.

=== Division of Animal Health ===
The Division of Animal Health was originally with Sheep Husbandry section but was upgraded as an independent division in 1987. The initial mandate of the division was to cover the health related aspects of the flocks under the institute. Later, the division was expanded by obtaining diagnostic laboratories and other equipment.

=== Division of Physiology and Biochemistry ===
CSWRI started a Physiology section 1965 for research on ovine physiology and reproduction with special emphasis on environmental physiology and applied reproduction. In 2003, the section was merged with Biochemistry section and the division was formed. Major projects of the division centers around ram semen preservation, artificial insemination and adjudging the physiological adaptability of different strains developed at the institute.

=== Division of Textile Manufacture and Textile Chemistry ===
The division was started in 1962 when the institute was formed and is engaged in basic and applied research on various aspects of wool and other animal fibres. It is mandated to carry out research on:

- Fibre characterization and evaluation
- Grading of wool and scouring
- Woolen spinning
- Worsted spinning
- Weaving
- Chemical and mechanical finishing
- Product development

The division has a wool processing plant at its command since 1968, equipped with a boiler, weaving machinery, worsted spinning machinery and other types of wool and animal fibre processing machineries and produces wool products for sale.

=== Division of Transfer of Technology and Social Sciences ===
TTS Division was established in 1972 and is the controlling centre of the institute on matters related to technology transfer. The division is entrusted with the responsibility to:

- Test and transfer the technologies being developed for increasing meat and wool production of sheep and rabbits.
- Survey and evaluate the productivity of sheep and rabbits in field conditions.
- Motivate farmers to increase sheep and rabbit production by adopting improved practices of breeding, feeding, reproduction, disease control, feed resource, wool utilization, marketing, etc.
- Create awareness in the sheep and rabbit farmers about improved animal husbandry practices.

The division is also active in farmer interaction programs such as health camps, sheep/farmer festivals, farmers' meets, forest festivals, observance of veterinary days and field visits.

== Sections ==
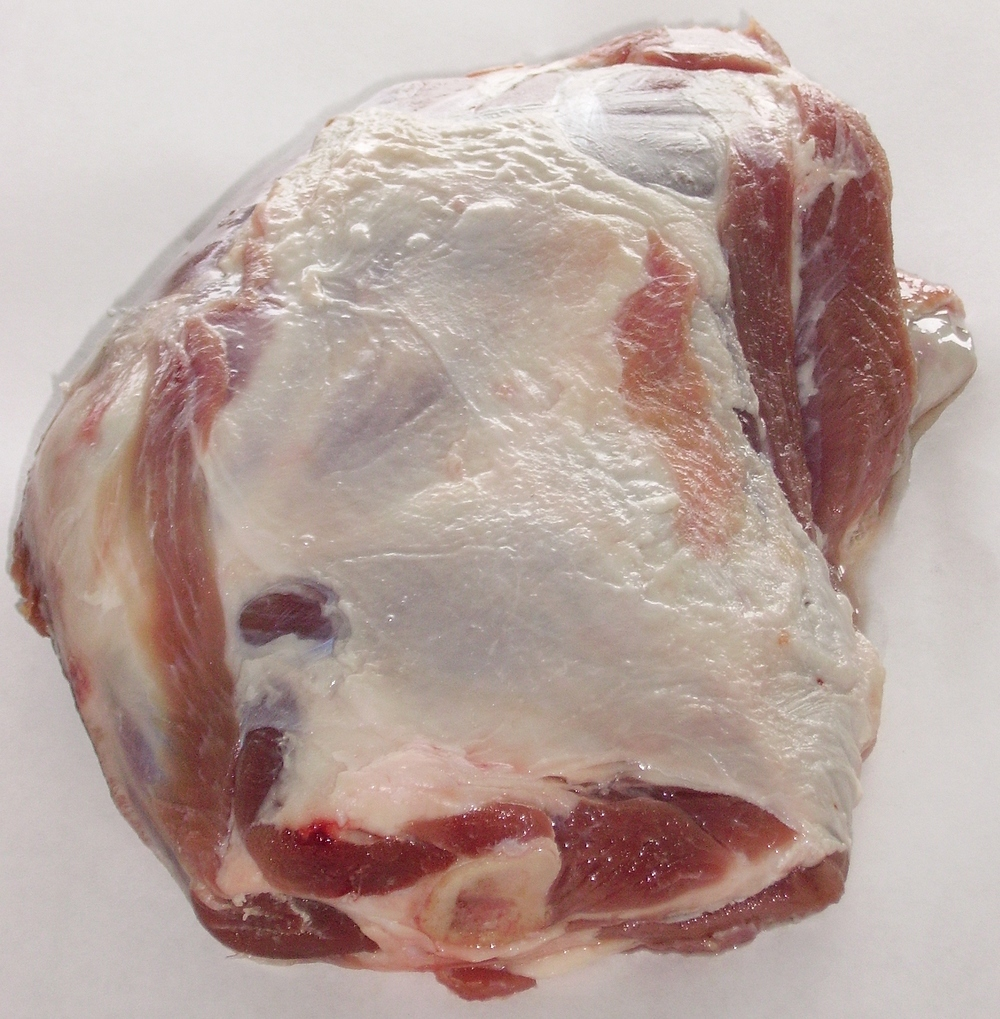
Shoulder of lamb

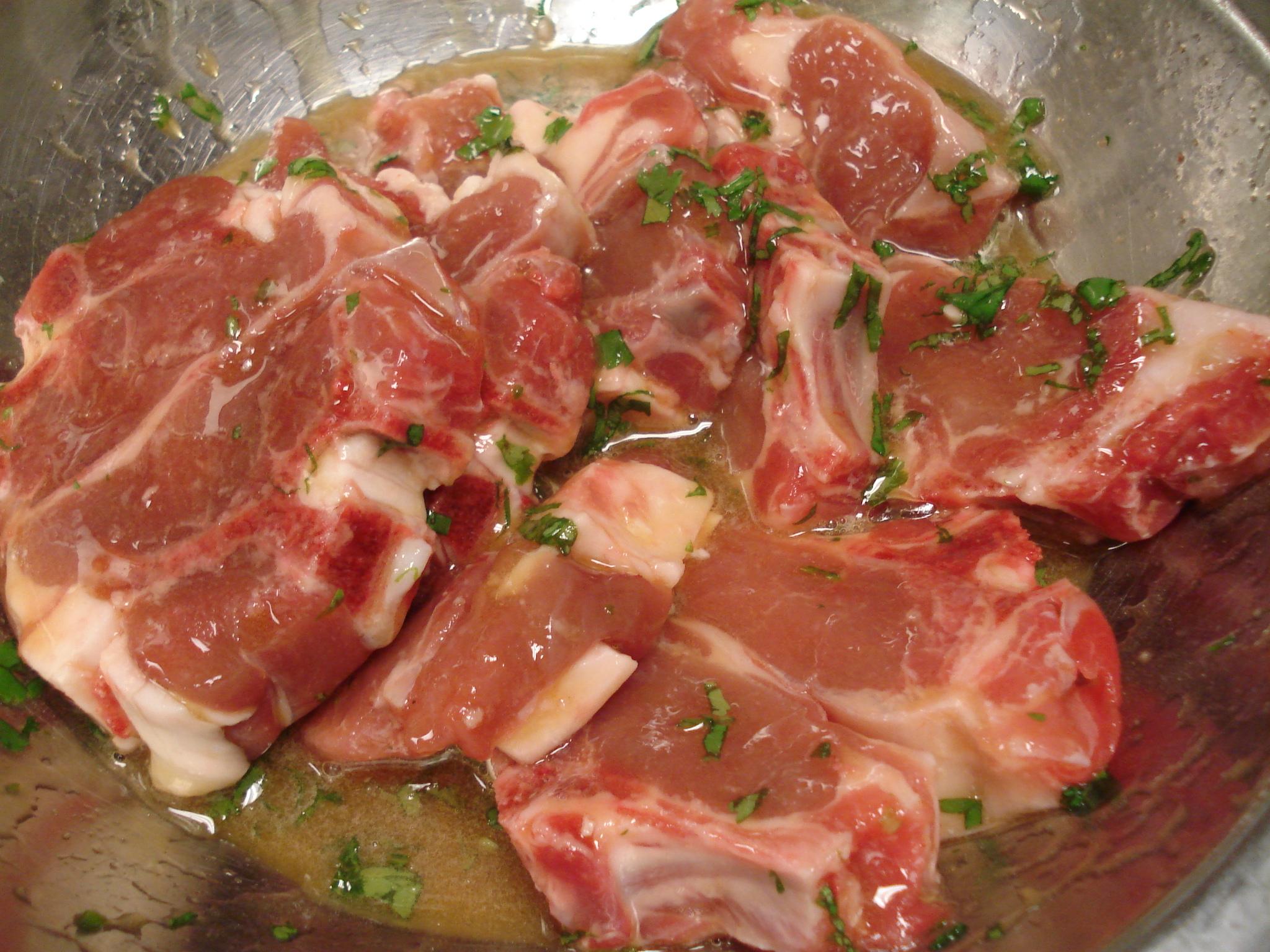
Goat chops

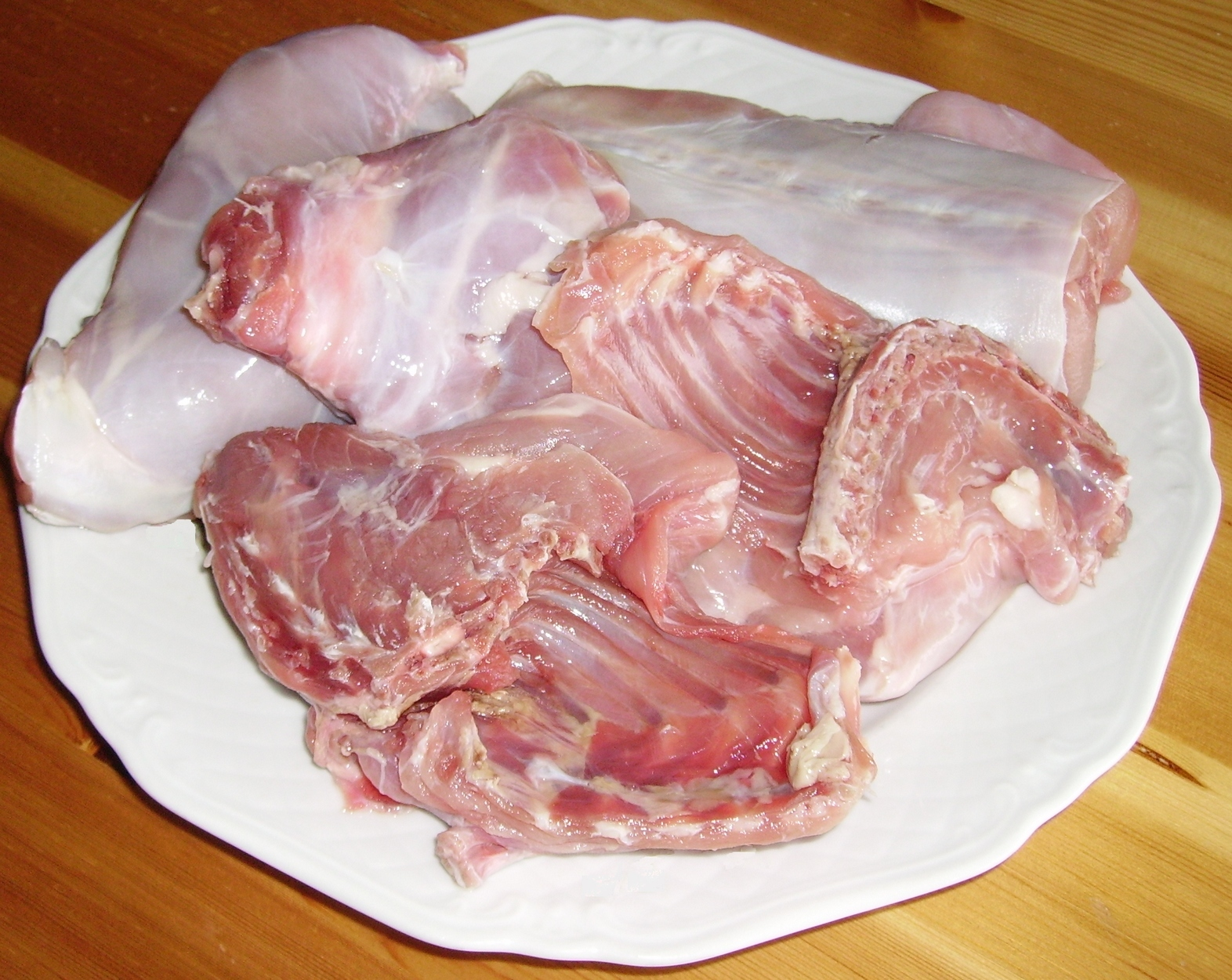
Rabbit meat

In addition to the six divisions, CSWRI has five sections attending to specified responsibilities.

=== Animal Biotechnology Section ===
The section, started in 2002, has a mandate to organise research on sheep genomics, reproductive biotechnology, disease resistance and molecular parasitology. It conducts research at the molecular level on various traits to identify genes/markers for application in the development of commercially viable breeds.

=== Grassland and Forage Agronomy Section ===
The section is entrusted with the responsibility for research and development in the fields of agronomy and soil culture. It attends to the matters such as pasture development, agroforestry, soil and water conservation and management and improvement of fodder cultivation.

=== Meat Science and Pelt Technology ===
The section is primarily engaged in research on meat and meat products. The section has developed many meat and related products and is also involved in pelt related products by effective carcass management.

=== Fibre Physics Section ===
Fibre Physics section is a later addition to CSWRI and is primarily engaged in the research and development of high quality wool and animal fibres.

=== PME Cell ===
The Priority setting, Monitoring and Evaluation cell is the documentation centre of CSWRI and is responsible for the following activities:

- Coordination and synthesis of the recommendations of QRT RAC, IRC vision documents of Institute and ICAR to recommend research priorities of the institution.
- Annual updation and presentation of the report to the Director of the Institution for assigning research projects.
- Coordination and arranging for annual monitoring of each on-going project and evaluation of completed project through internal and external experts.
- Coordination and arranging for technology validation and/or impact assessment of successful technology claimed by Scientist(s) through internal and external experts.
- Regular sensitization and capacity building of research managers and scientists through training programmes.
- Maintenance of a database on all publications, technologies developed, IPRs, consultancies, projects undertaken and on-going projects.

=== PC Cell, Network Project on Sheep Improvement (ICAR-NWPSI) ===
Network Project on Sheep Improvement (NWPSI) was initiated on to undertake survey, evaluation and improvement of indigenous sheep breeds under native environment. Different breeds of sheep are being improved through selection and inter-se mating for wool and mutton production. The mandate of NWPSI is genetic evaluation and improvement of indigenous sheep by selection. Presently, there are six ongoing centres of NWPSI including four farm based units and two field based units located at difference parts of the country. Coordination Cell: Project Coordinator Cell, NWPSI, ICAR-CSWRI, Avikanagar

Cooperating Units:

A. Farm based Cooperating units

1.ARC (CSWRI), Bikaner - Marwari sheep for Carpet Wool

2.CIRG, Makhdoom - Muzaffarnagri sheep for Dual purpose

3.MPKV, Rahuri - Deccani sheep for Dual purpose

4.SVVU, Palamner - Nellore sheep for Mutton

B. Field based Cooperating units

1.TANUVAS, Kattupakkam - Madras Red sheep for Mutton

2.ARC (CSWRI), Bikaner- Magra Sheep for Carpet wool

The objectives of NWPSI is Genetic improvement of indigenous sheep breeds by selection. The technical programme aims at improvement of indigenous sheep breeds under farm conditions wherein the male lambs are first ranked using selection index. Index incorporates body weight and wool yield at six months of age. Each field-based unit has four centres including a ram-rearing centre, covering a sheep population of about 1500 sheep per centre. The superior male lambs are selected from the farmers’ flocks on the basis of GFY1 and 6-month body weigh in Magra sheep and on six-month body weight basis in Madras Red sheep. Male lambs are initially identified at 3 month of age and are finally selected after first shearing. Selected male lambs from improver flocks are supplied for breeding to base flocks.

Breeding rams of high breeding value are produced from farm based unit every year for germplasm distribution. During the XI plan period about 900 improved breeding rams/ram lambs from five Farm Based Units were sold to different farmers/ State Govt/ NGOs for breed improvement programme and about 700 breeding rams / ram lambs were distributed in three Field Based Units for improvement of farmers flock. The Sheep Improvement Programmes will continue and efforts will be made to bring overall improvement in sheep productivity through distribution of superior germplasm and adoption of improved scientific management practices.

== Technological developments ==
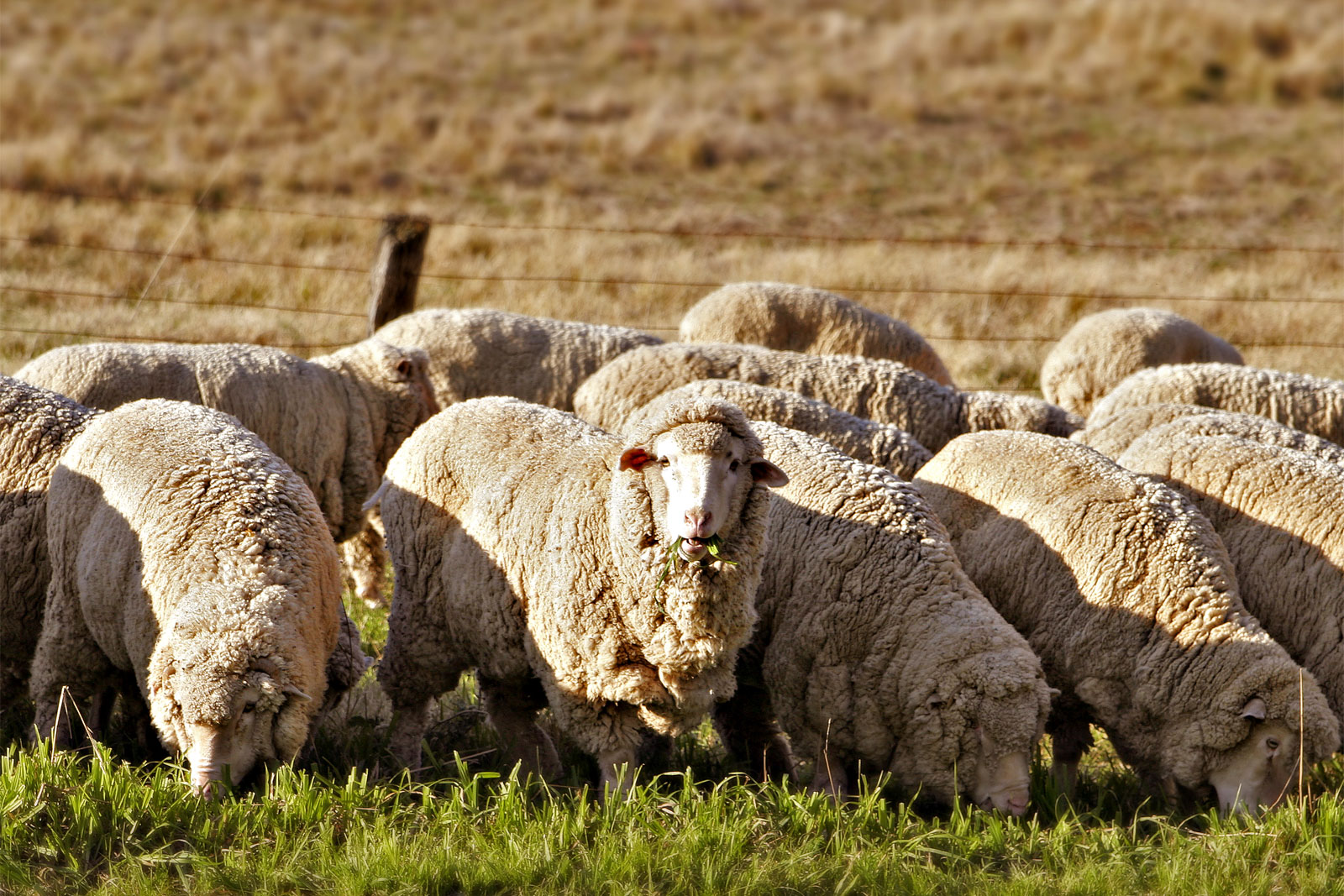
Merino Sheep

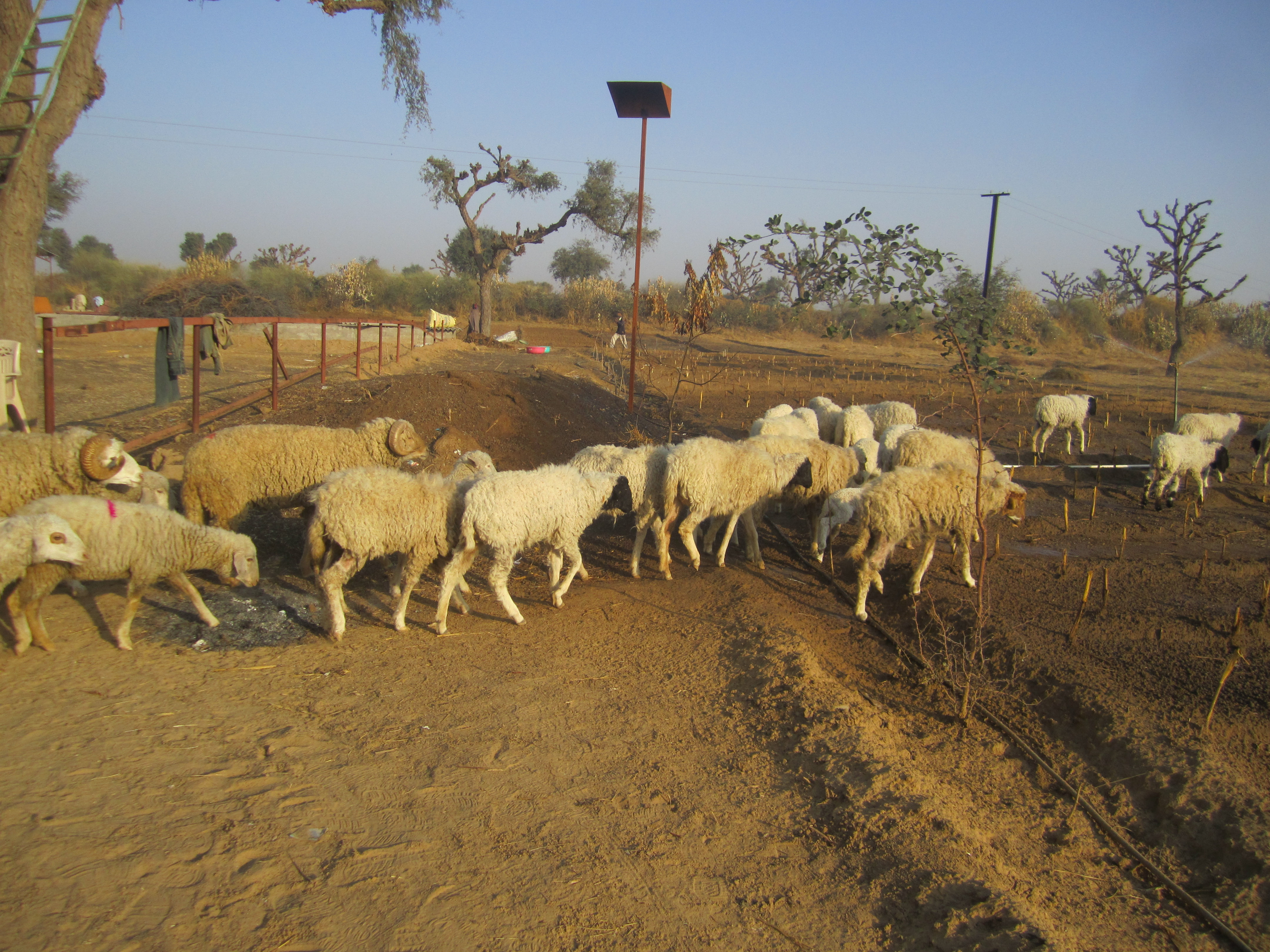
Magra Sheep Flock

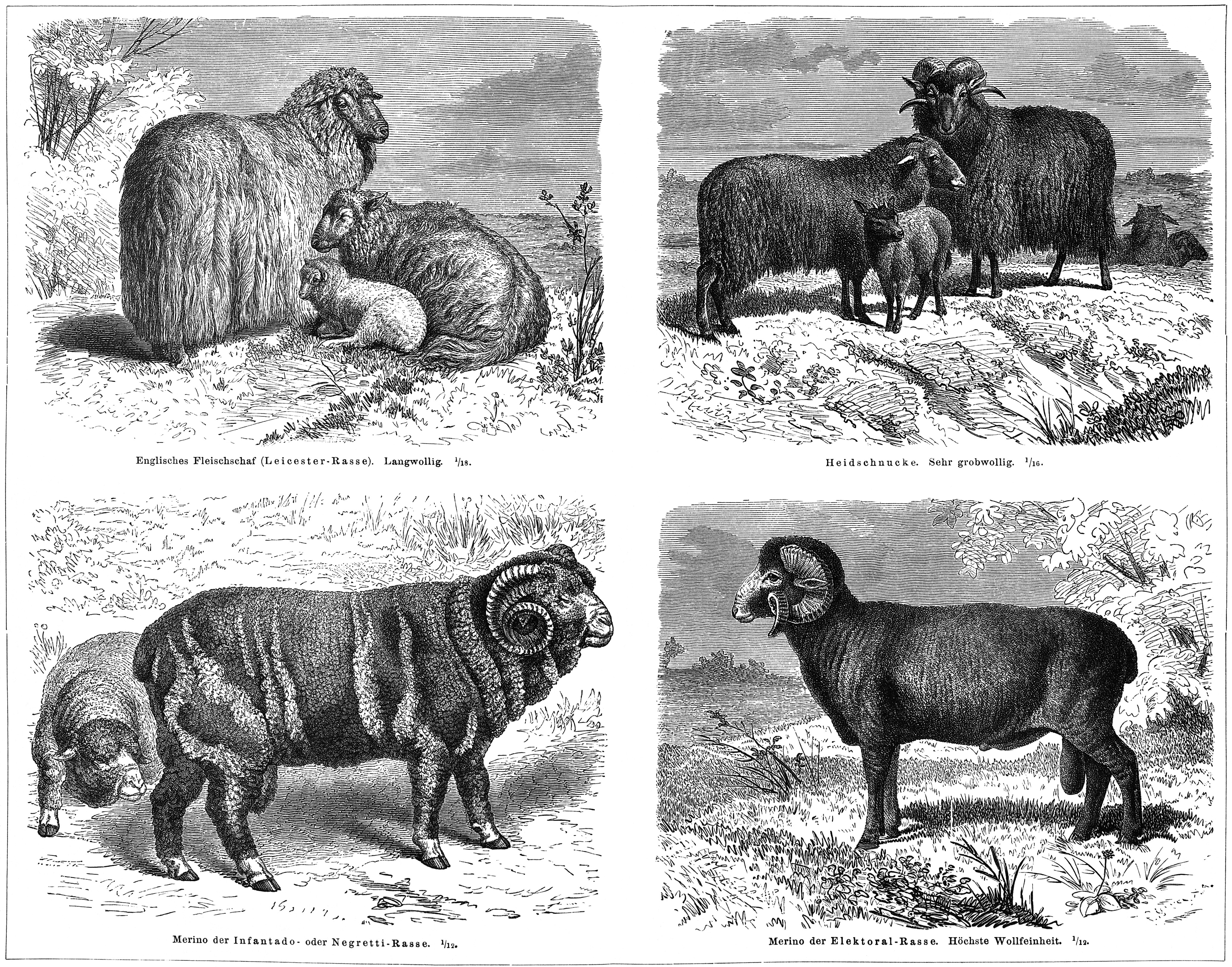
4 breeds of sheep, in the illustrated encyclopedia Meyers Konversationslexikon

CSWRI is credited with scientific animal husbandry efforts in the development of new strains of sheep for wool production such as Avikalin sheep for carpet wool production and Bharat Merino sheep for fine wool production in temperate climate. The institute has also done research work with results in developing scientific breeding techniques of Malpura, Marwari, Magra and Chokla sheep. It has also been successful in crossbreeding of Malpura, Garole and Patanwadi breeds of sheep.

The institute has also developed:

- Development of elite sheep flocks such as Malpura (750), Chokla (550), Avikalin (350), Patanwadi (350), Patanwadi crosses (200), Garole (40) for genetic improvement and other technology development.
- Development of improved germplasm of Malpura sheep breed for meat.
- Development of Chokla sheep breed for carpet wool breed.
- Development of prolific Garole sheep breed.
- Artificial insemination (AI) in sheep with liquid semen.
- Indigenous intra-vaginal sponges for oestrus induction and synchronization.
- Intensive lamb rearing techniques for maximizing mutton production.
- Area-specific mineral mixture.
- Development of complete feed blocks.
- Development of planned flock health calendar for sheep flocks in semi-arid Rajasthan.
- Modified worm management technology.
- Targeted selective treatment (TST) approach for management of haemonchosis in sheep.
- Development of FROGIN: Software for forecasting gastrointestinal nematodiasis in sheep of Rajasthan.
- Development of an ELISA for diagnosis of paratuberculosis (Johne's Disease).
- Development of carpet from indigenous wool and its blends.
- Development of high productivity, low cost and profitable carpet manufacturing techniques.
- Development of dying technology using natural dyes for wool and specialty fibres.
- Value added meat products developed from mutton.

== Institute Technology Management Unit (ITMU) ==
Institute Technology Management Unit is the controlling body of CSWRI with regard to intellectual property rights and technology transfer and operates as per guidelines issued by the ICAR. The unit was established in 2008 and is jointly funded by ICAR and National Agricultural Innovation Projects (NAIP).

== Agricultural Knowledge Management Unit ==
The Agricultural Knowledge Management Unit (AKMU) is the information and knowledge management hub of CSWRI and the unit is mandated to:

- Enhance accessibility of research information.
- Build the capacity to organize, store, retrieve and use the relevant information into the agricultural research infrastructure.
- Provide electronic options to plan, execute, monitor and evaluate research programs.

CSWRI, recognised by the Government of India as a central research institute, is equipped with National Knowledge Network (NKN) connectivity @ one gigabit bandwidth, Internet connectivity to all Divisions & Sections through Broadband, Wired Local Area Network (LAN), Wireless Local Area Network and a secure Fortigate gateway system. It also maintains a library which stocks 10430 books, 11475 back volumes, 1117 office rules and regulations and 111 master and doctoral theses and subscribes 30 foreign journals, 81 Indian journals and 22 free/gratis journals. it also maintains a CD and database collection.

== Patents ==
CSWRI holds patent rights several technological developments in the fields of cattle rearing and related areas.

- Indigenous progesterone impregnated vaginal sponges for estrus synchronization in sheep
- Method to deliver nematophagous fungus, Duddingtonia flagrans to sheep for biological control of Haemonchus contortus.
- Area specific mineral-mixture pellets for augmenting reproduction and production in sheep.
- Production of fermented probiotic feed, production protocol, fermentation conditions, drying, storage and similar uses.
- Fermentation vessel for conducting gas production studies (in vitro): fabrication, protocol and uses.
- Low cost, indigenous cradle for safe restraining of sheep for pregnancy diagnosis.
- Low cost, indigenous vaginal sponges for estrus control in buffaloes.
