= Malpura =

- Town
- Location in Rajasthan, India Malpura (India)
- Coordinates: 26.28°N 75.38°E
- Country: India
- State: Rajasthan
- District: Tonk
- Established: 1216AD 807 years ago
- Founder: Maldev
- Named for: Maldev

Government
  - Type: Municipality
  - Body: Malpura City Municipality
  - Chairman: Mrs. Soniya Manish Soni
  - Administrator: Mr. Manoj Kumar Verma RAS
- Elevation: 332 m (1,089 ft)

Population (2011)
  - Total: 36,028
- Demonyms: Malpurawaale

Languages
  - Official: Hindi
  - Additional: English
  - Regional: Dhundari
- Time zone: UTC+5:30 (IST)
- PIN: 304502 304502
- ISO 3166 code: RJ-IN
- Vehicle registration: RJ-26

Malpura is a town with municipality in Tonk district in the Indian state of Rajasthan. Malpura is known for its Dadabadi, built by the Khartargach Sect of Shewtambar Jain in memory of 3rd Dada Gurudev Shri Jinkushalsurishwarji. Also known for its Forts, Malpura is popular visiting palace in Rajasthan.

== Geography ==
Malpura is at 26.28°N 75.38°E. It has an average elevation of 132 metres (401 feet).

== Demographics ==
As per the Population Census 2011, there are a total 6,252 families residing in the Malpura city. The total population of Malpura is 36,028 out of which 18,605 are males and 17,423 are females thus the Average Sex Ratio of Malpura is 936. Child Sex Ration was 805 which is less than Average Sex Ratio (936 ) of Malpura. As per the Census 2011, the literacy rate of Malpura is 77.5%. Thus Malpura has a higher literacy rate compared to 61.6% of Tonk district. The male literacy rate is 88.19% and the female literacy rate is 66.33%.Scheduled Castes and Scheduled Tribes made up 6,527 (18.11%) and 223 (0.61%) of the population, respectively.

According to Census 2011, there were 4,757 children between aged 0 to 6 years in Malpura. Out of which 2,636 were male while 2,121 were female.

Religion in Malpura City (2011)
Religion	Percent
Hinduism	64.62%
Islam	28.53%
Jainism	6.42%
Sikhism	0.13%
Buddhist	0.09%
Christianity	0.02%
Other or not stated	0.19%
Distribution of religions

=== Language ===
The official language of Malpura is Hindi and the additional official language is English. The native and main dialect of the city is Dhundari with Marwari and Standard Hindi dialects are also spoken, along with English.

=== Religion ===
According to the 2011 census, Hindus form the majority religious group, accounting for 64.62% of the city's population, followed by Muslims (28.53%), Jains (6.42%) and others (0.43%).

== Notable sights ==
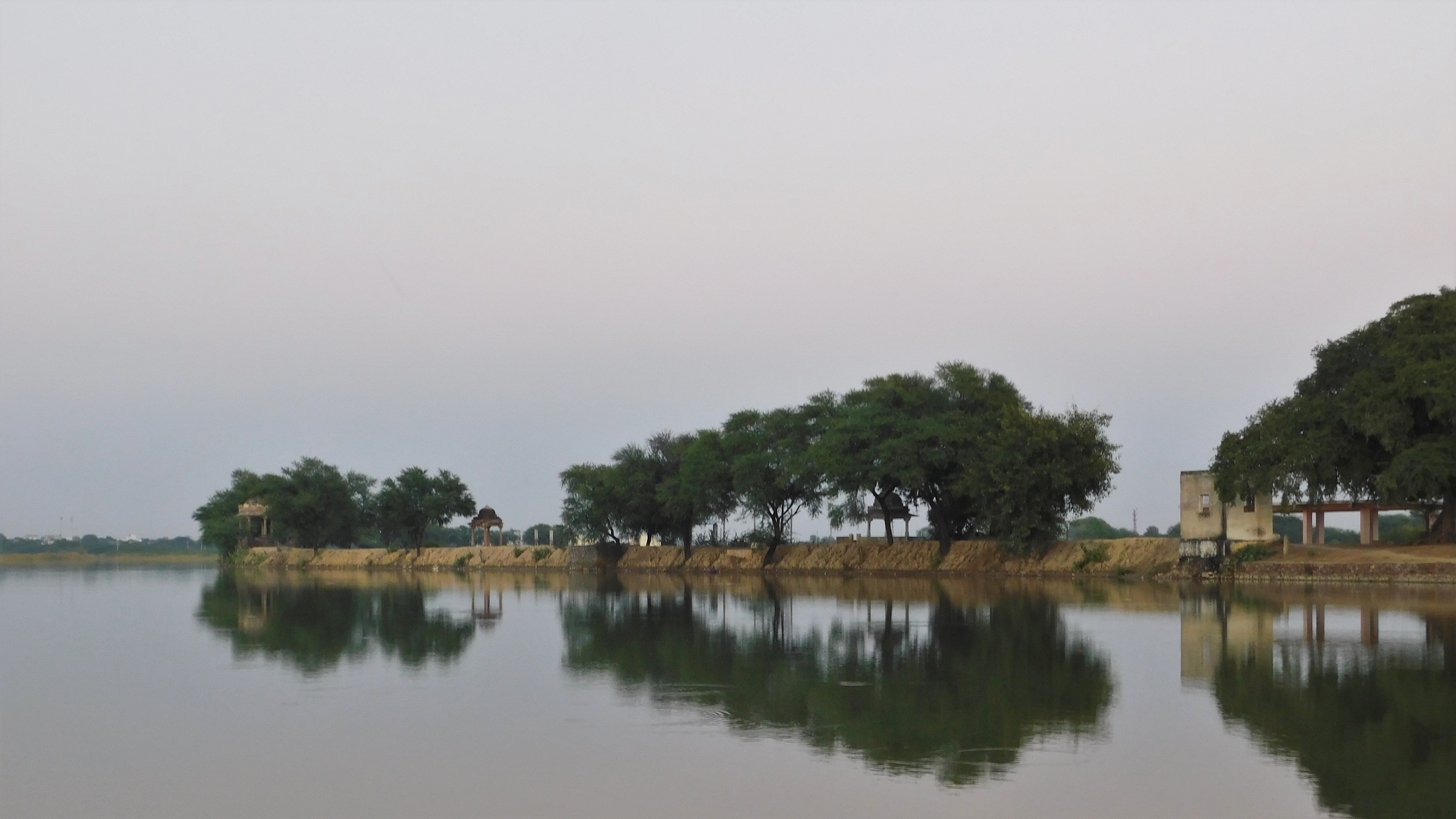
Brahma Taalaab

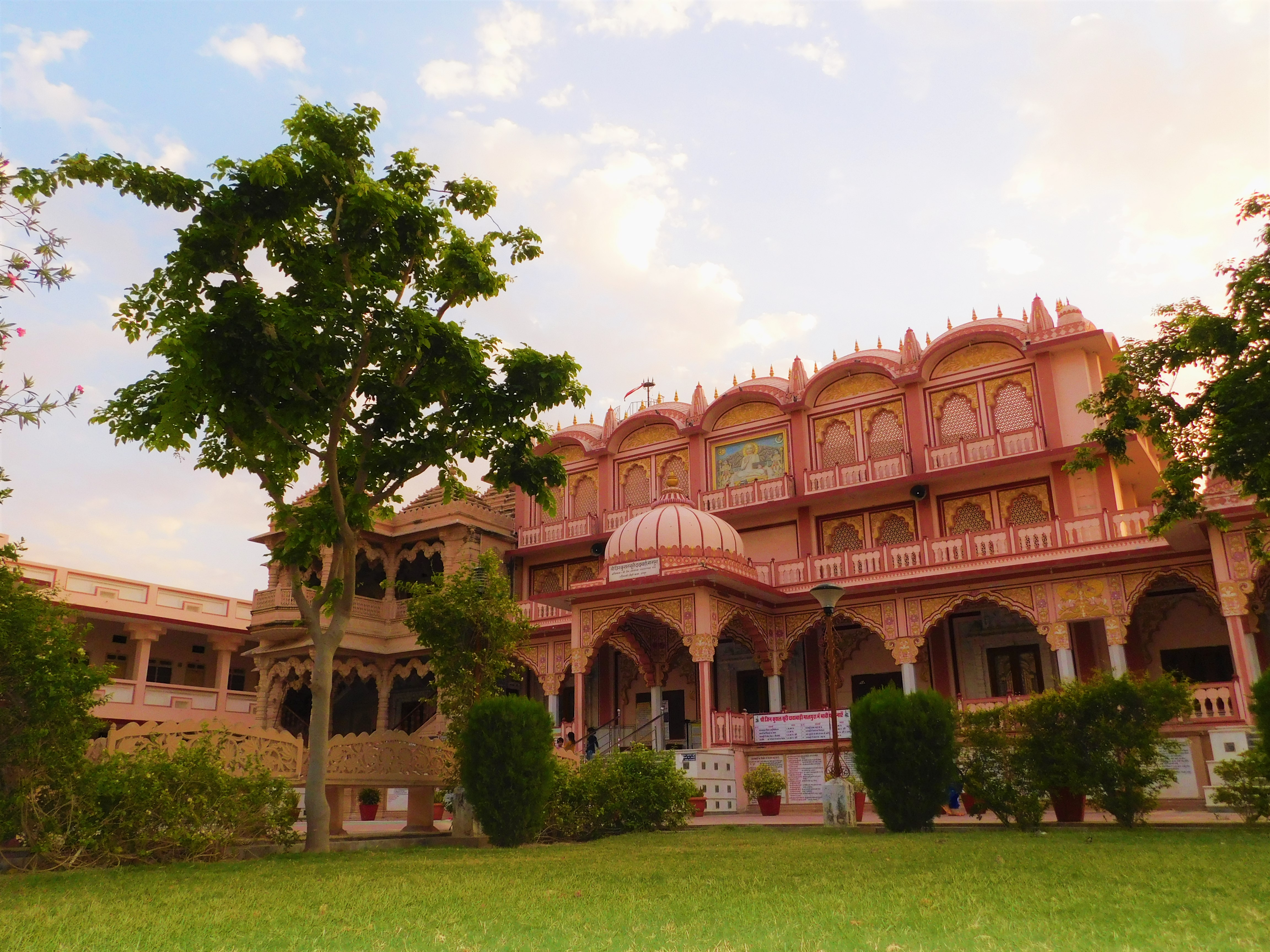
Jain Dadabadi

- Onn mataji temple.
- Shri Kalyan Temple Diggi - a famous temple which is 13 km from Malpura. Here a very ancient temple of god Kalyan (Vishnu) built by king Digva is present.
- Malpura Municipality is headed by Mrs. Sonia Manish Soni
- Gunat Mata Temple [Dhola Ka Kheda]
- Jeen Mata Temple Doongri Khurd
- Bisalpur Dam - situated 48 km from Malpura. It is one of the important dams project in Rajasthan built across Banas river.
- Sindholiya temple
- Lamba harisingh
- Beriya Balaji
- Avikanagar. It is the largest sheep research centre of India located 5 km from Malpura along the Jaipur road. Kendriya Vidyalaya Avikanagar from 1st to 12th standard and Government Secondary School Avikanagar from 6th to 10th standard are also situated in the CSWRI Avikanagar campus.
- Ghati Balaji
- Malpura is famous for its Jain Dadabadi and Adinath Jain temple.
- An important temple, Malpura dadabadi of Dada Jinkushalsuriji is there.
- It has one Government hospital & many private hospital such as Rekha Devi Memorial Hospital and a nursing college.
- Rajasthan patrika founder late Shri Karpoor Chandra Kulish is from nearby Soda village.
- Sindoliya Mataji Ramphool singh
