= Akhtar Sheerani =

Urdu poet and writer (1905–1948)

Akhtar Shirani
- اختر شیرانی
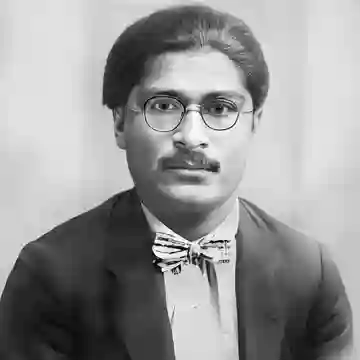
- Akhtar Shirani
- Born: Muhammad Dawood Khan; 4 May 1905; Tonk, Rajputana Agency, British India (present-day Tonk, Rajasthan, India)
- Died: 9 September 1948 (aged 43); Lahore, Pakistan
- Citizenship: British India, Pakistan
- Education: Oriental College, Lahore
- Occupation: Urdu poet
- Relatives: Hafiz Mehmood Khan Shirani (Father)
- Writing career
- Pen name: Akhtar Shirani, Akhtar Sheerani, Akhtar Sherani
- Period: 1905–1948
- Genres: Nazm and Ghazal
- Movement: Urdu poetry

Akhtar Shīrānī (Urdu: اختر شیرانی, romanized: Axtar Śērānī; born Muhammad Dawood Khan; 4 May 1905 – 9 September 1948), also spelled Sheerani or Sherani, was a Pakistani Urdu romance poet and writer.

== Early life and career ==
He was born on 4 May 1905 as Muhammad Dawood Khan, into a family belonging to the Pashtun Shirani tribe, which migrated to India with Sultan Mahmud of Ghazni. The tribe later settled in Tonk, Rajasthan. He was the son of Hafiz Mahmood Shirani, a scholar and teacher who taught at Islamia College, Lahore in 1921, before moving to Oriental College, Lahore in 1928. Dawood moved to Lahore at a young age and spent most of his life there. He completed his Munshi Fazil (منشی فاضل) (Masters degree) in 1921 and Adeeb Fazil (ادیب فاضل) (Postgraduate degree) in 1922, earning degrees in Arabic and Persian also from Oriental College.

He decided to pursue poetry full time after graduating. His ustad (mentor) was Maulana Tajwar Najibabadi, who had been published in literary magazines. Since his birth name was relatively common, he adopted 'Akhtar' Shirani as his pen name.

== Personal life ==
Shirani's son, Javed Mahmood, died at an unknown age. He had another son, Dr. Mazhar Mahmood Shirani, a professor at Government College University, who died in 2020.

== Career ==
Akhtar wrote columns for the daily newspapers Hamdard and Zamindar, published by Maulana Muhammad Ali Johar and Maulana Zafar Ali Khan, respectively. He also published his magazine Romaan, which introduced many emerging writers, including Ahmad Nadeem Qasmi and Qudratullah Shahab.

He became known as شاعرِ رومان (The Poet of Romance) because of his philosophical and inspiring poems.

His best-known poetry collections include Akhtaristan, Nigarshaat-e-Akhtar, Lala-e-Toor, Tayyur-e-Aawara, Naghma-e-Haram, Subh-e-Bahaar, and Shahnaz. From 1923 to 1939, he served as the editor of several literary magazines, including Intikhab, Bahaaristan, Khyaalistan, and Romaan.

== Style and influence on Urdu poetry ==
Much of Akhtar's poetry was in the romantic tradition, similar to the Romanticism movement of European literature. His work focuses on landscape and women. He wrote romantic poetry that described both the physical beauty of women and the role of women in history and wider human existence. He also wrote both poetry and prose for children. He wrote in the nazm, radif and qafiya rhyming style, rather than blank verse.

According to Pakistan Post: "He exhales verse as a flower exhales fragrance. His verses touching colourful subjects flow with such tremendous ease and felicity as the reader is moved to ecstasy...artistic skills of Akhtar Shairani's poetry lend him a distinguished place in modern Urdu poetry".

His better known poems include:

- Aurat (Woman)
- "Ae ishq kahin le chal"
- "O des se aane wale bata"
- "Ae ishq humein barbad na kar", a poem sung by Nayyara Noor
- "Main aarzoo-e-jaan likhoon ya jaan-e-aarzu"
- "Kuchch to tanhaai ki raaton ka sahara hota"
- "Barsaat"
- "Tumhein sitaaron ne be-ikhtiar dekha hai"
- "Woh kehte hain ranjish ki baatain bhula dein", a ghazal sung by Malika Pukhraj
- "Woh kabhi mil jayen toh kya kijiye", a ghazal sung by Ghulam Ali

== Death and legacy ==
On his death, Agha Shorish Kashmiri, a literary, political, and social figure in Lahore at the time, commented that seeing Shirani's physical and mental state would leave one deeply saddened. He was admitted to Mayo Hospital, Lahore, on 3 September 1948, and died in Lahore on 9 September 1948, while visiting a friend, Hakeem Nayyar Wasty, in Masti Gate. Sheerani is buried in Miani Sahib Graveyard. This was two days before the death of Muhammad Ali Jinnah.

=== Commemorative postage stamp ===
Pakistan Postal Services issued a commemorative postage stamp in his honor in 2005 in its 'Poets of Pakistan' series.

== See also ==
- Shahab Nama, a book by Qudratullah Shahab

== Bibliography ==
- Hasani, Yunus (1976). Ak̲h̲tar Shīrānī aur jadīd Urdū adab [Ak̲h̲tar Shīrānī and Modern Urdu Literature] (in Urdu). Karachi: Anjuman Taraqqi-e-Urdu. OCLC 21482347.
- Jahan, Qamar (1987). Ak̲h̲tar Shīrānī kī jinsī aur rūmānī shāʻirī [Romantic Poetry of Akhtar Shirani] (in Urdu). Bhagalpur: Seema Publications. OCLC 21300986.
- Tonki, Mukhtar (2012). Mut̤ālaʻah-yi Ak̲h̲tar Shīrānī: talāsh o tajziyah [Study on the works of Ak̲h̲tar Shīrānī]. New Delhi: Modern Publishing House. OCLC 1023825148.
- Singhal, Hanuman (1993). Akhtar Śhīrānī, fan aura śak̲h̲siyat (in Hindi and Urdu). Tonk: Sāhitya Kalā Saṅgama. OCLC 29316038.
- Nim, Pushpendra Kumar (2019). Rūmānī shāʻir, Ak̲h̲tar Shīrānī [The Romantic Poet: Akhtar Shirani]. Delhi: Educational Publishing House. OCLC 1232011161.
