= Hadi Rani Ki Baori =

Stepwell in Rajasthan, India

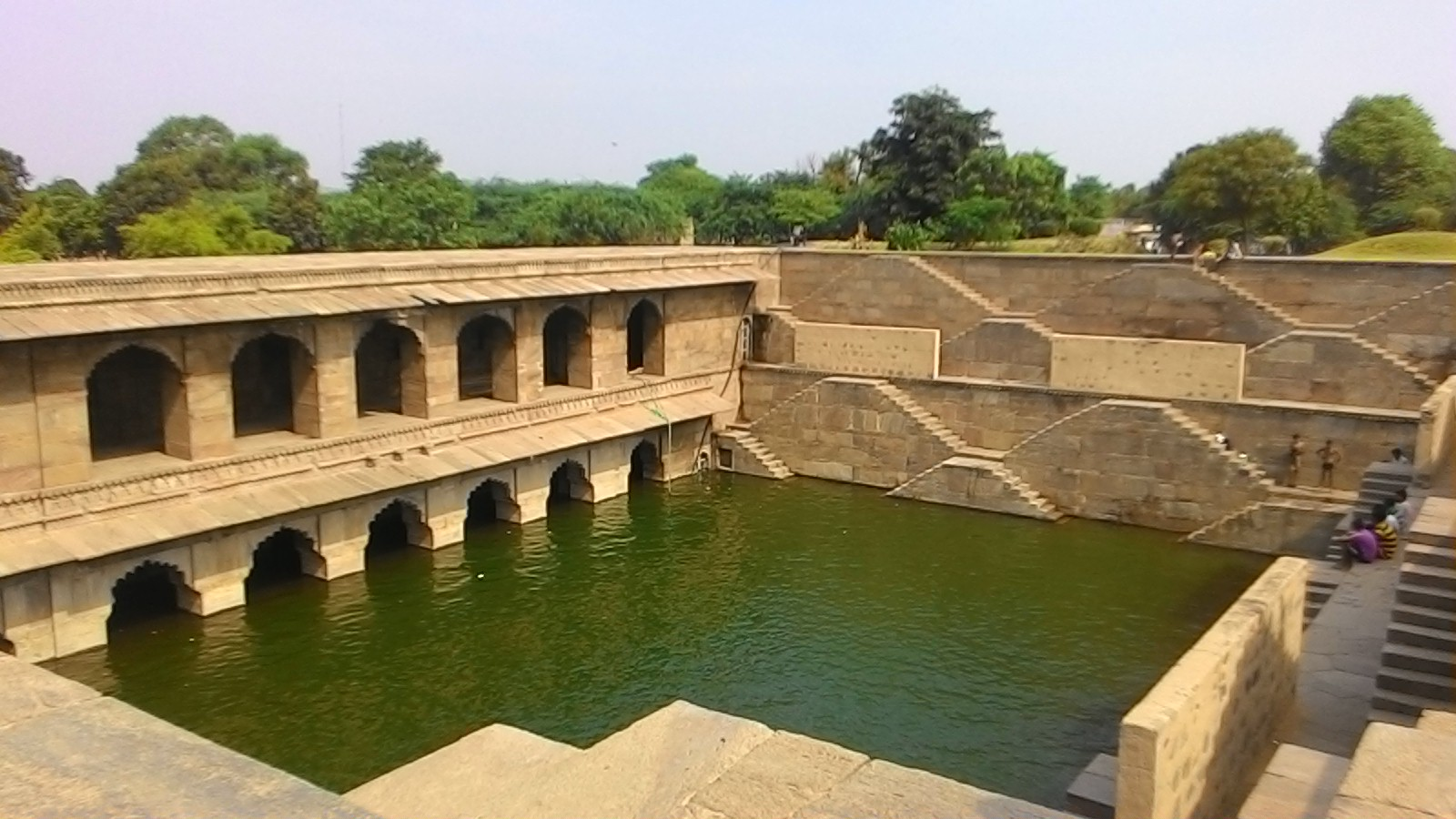

- Location within Rajasthan
- 26°1′13.97″N 75°28′42.43″E
- Location: Tonk district, Rajasthan

Hadi Rani ki Baori is a stepwell located in Todaraisingh town in Tonk district of Rajasthan state in India. It is believed that it was built in 17th century AD.

The stepwell is rectangular in plan with double-storeyed corridors on one side each having arched doorway and below the lower storey there are images of Brahma, Ganesha and Mahishasuramardini.

Bollywood movie Paheli (2005) starring Shahrukh Khan, Rani Mukerji some scenes were shot at this bawri which is located near Bisalpur Dam.

== History ==
The Hadi Rani Ki Baori is a square‑shaped stepwell whose layout departs from strict axial symmetry, instead featuring staggered flights of steps that descend in broad, shallow tiers to the water below. Each side of the well is lined by a double‑storey corridor, the upper level punctuated by arched doorways set within thick sandstone walls that provide shaded promenade and structural support. At mid‑point on the main facade, the lower gallery gives way to a wider stair landing designed to hold larger pools of water during the monsoon, while narrower steps on the other sides regulate water flow as levels recede.

The upper storey of the well houses a sequence of carved niches containing images of Ganesha, Brahma and Mahishasuramardini, reflecting the site's ritual associations and the artisanship of 17th‑century Rajasthani sculptors. Although the well is relatively shallow compared to other baoris in the region, its walls are constructed of finely dressed local sandstone blocks laid in regular courses, retaining crisp joints and minimal mortar joints. A low parapet at the top of the wall encircles the well, offering protection to visitors and a clear vantage point for observing the interplay of light and shadow on the water's surface.
