= Parasiya =

Coordinates: 21°54′N 78°34′E

- village
- Interactive map of Parasiya
- Country: India
- State: Rajasthan
- District: Tonk

Government
  - Type: Panchayati raj (India)
  - Body: Gram panchayat

Languages
  - Official: Hindi
- Time zone: UTC+5:30 (IST)
- ISO 3166 code: RJ-IN
- Coastline: 0 kilometres (0 mi)
- Nearest city: Tonk

See also Manoharpura

Parasiya, is a small village in Tonk District. The village is situated near the 1 km from Lamba village,4 km from Mehandwas village and 16 km from Tonk city of Rajasthan, India.

The village has population about 800 and most from Jat community. Almost 97% people earn their lives from Agriculture.
