= Natwara =

Village in Rajasthan

- Village
- Location within Rajasthan Location within India
- Coordinates: 26°13′05″N 75°57′47″E
- Country: India
- State: Rajasthan
- District: Tonk

Population (2011)
  - Total: 4,086

Demographics
  - Literacy: 66.13%
  - Sex ratio: 944

Natwara is a village located in Newai Tehsil of Tonk district, Rajasthan, India.
