= Chandlai =

Village in Jaipur (Rajasthan), India

- village
- Location in Rajasthan, India Chandlai (India)
- Coordinates: 26.68°N 75.88°E
- Country: India
- State: Rajasthan
- District: Jaipur
- Elevation: 313 m (1,027 ft)

Population (2001)
  - Total: 3,176

Languages
  - Official: Hindi
- Time zone: UTC+5:30 (IST)
- PIN: 303907
- ISO 3166 code: RJ-IN

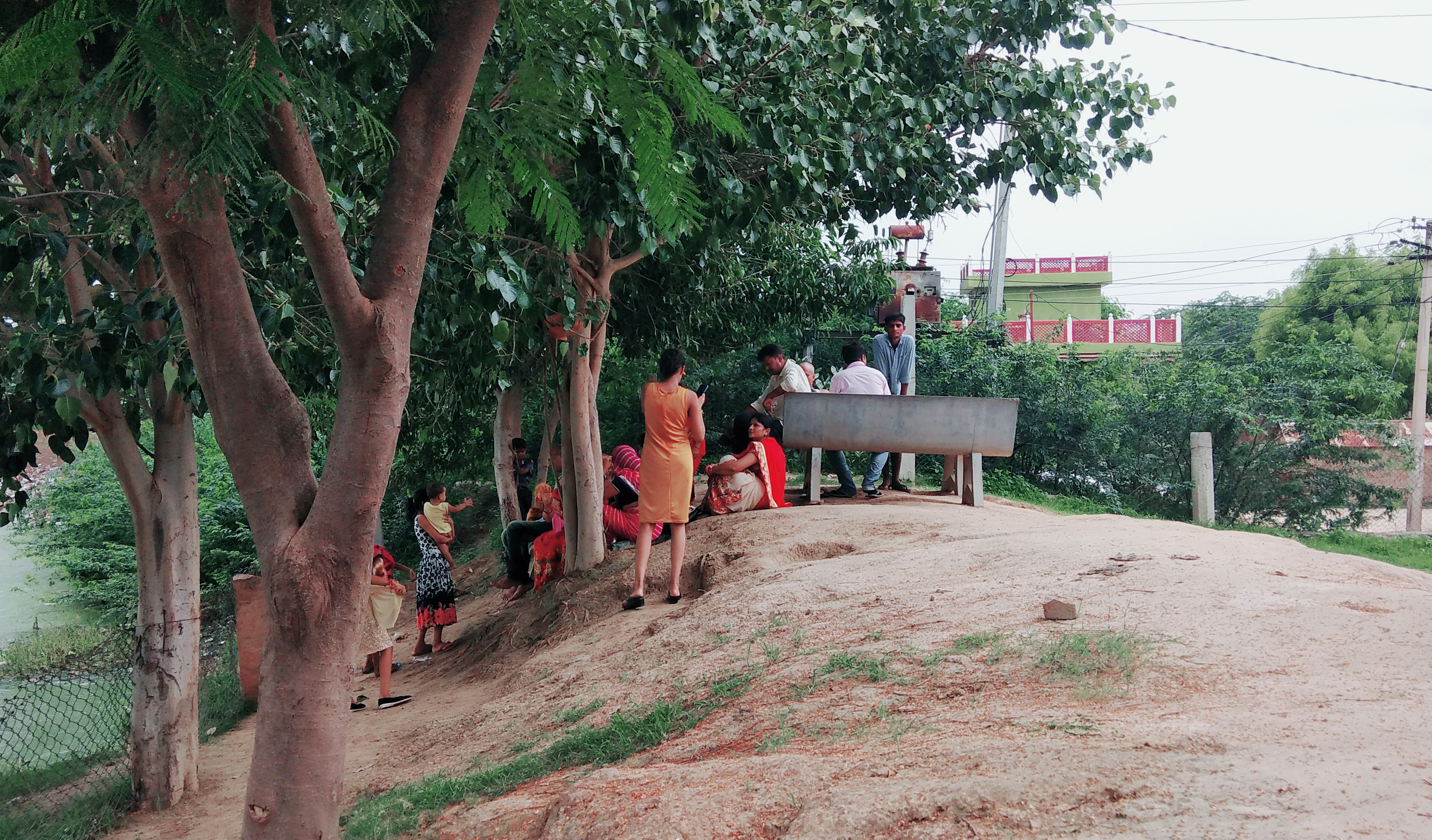
Ramsagar dam situated at Chandlai village

Chandlai is a village in Jaipur district of Rajasthan, India. It is located at latitude 26.68 longitude 75.88 at an elevation of 333 metres (1,093 ft). It is 10 kilometres (6.2 mi) from Tonk on the Tonk – Kota road.
