= Parasia (disambiguation) =

Parasia is a town in the Indian state of West Bengal.

Parasia may also refer to:

- Dongar Parasia, town, municipality and tehsil in Chhindwara district, Madhya Pradesh, India
- Parasiya, village in Tonk district, Rajasthan, India
