= Sardar Singh II =

Rao Raja of Uniara (1913-1969)

Sardar Singh II was the Rao Raja of Uniara from 1913 until his death in 1969.

== Early life and family ==
He was born on 3 October 1894 to Rup Singh, the Thakur of Hardattpura. He married and had three sons—Rajendra Singh, Digvijay Singh, and Jayendra Singh—and two daughters, the eldest of whom married Jorawarsinhji, the Thakore of Wadhwan, and the younger, Phool Kumari, who married the Rao Raja of Garhi. Guman Singh, the Rao Raja of Uniara, who had no male issue, adopted Sardar as his son and heir.

== Reign ==
Upon the death of his adoptive father, he succeeded to his title, rank, and dignity on 13 March 1913. His succession was approved by the Maharaja of Jaipur. He had opened a dispensary at Awan and another at Uniara. He had raised the upper primary school in his estate to a middle school and had opened branch schools in all four tehsils of his estate. During the First World War, he furnished 250 recruits and subscribed Rs. 20,000 to various funds.

== Death ==
He died in 1969 and was succeeded by Rajendra Singh in his title, rank, and dignity.
