= Hafiz Mehmood Khan Shirani =

Indian researcher and poet

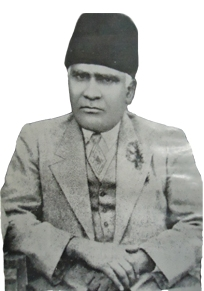
Prof. Hafiz Mahmood Shirani, A renowned scholar of Arabic, Persian & Urdu literature. (Source: Arabic Persian Research Institute, Tonk, Rajasthan)

Hafiz Mehmood Shirani (5 October 1880 – 15 February 1946) was an Indian researcher and poet during the British era.

He was the father of famous Urdu poet Akhtar Sheerani (1905 – 1948).

== Life and career ==
Mehmood Khan Shirani was born on 5 October 1880 in Tonk, Rajasthan, British India. He memorized the Quran at a young age and then first learned the basics of Persian language. Then he finished his basic early school education in Jodhpur, Rajasthan in 1898. After that, he went to Lahore to do his Munshi Alam degree in 1899 followed by a Munshi Faazal degree in 1901.

His son, Muhammad Dawood Khan, later to become a notable Urdu poet by the professional name Akhtar Sheerani (1905-1948) was born on 4 May 1905 in his native town Tonk, Rajasthan.

Mehmood Shirani started teaching Urdu at Islamia College, Lahore in 1921.

In 1928, he started teaching at Oriental College, Lahore. He retired from his teaching profession in 1940. He was a researcher and his "Punjab Mein Urdu" theory and later published book made him famous.

== Death ==
Hafiz Mehmood Khan Shirani died on 15 February 1946 in his native town of Tonk, Rajasthan, British India.

== Works ==
=== Books ===
  - Punjab Mein Urdu (1928)
  - Tanqid-e-Sherul Ajam (1942)
  - Firdausi par char Maqale
  - Rise and progress of Mohammedanism
  - Maqalat-e-Hafiz Mahmood Shirani (1948) (later, after his death, 10 editions of this book were published in Pakistan from 1966 to 2007)
  - Khaliq-e-Bari (1944)

=== Articles ===
  - Eusuf va Zulekha-e Firdausi
  - Firdausi ka mazhab
  - Hijv Sultan Mahmood Ghaznavi
  - Farsi Shayeri aur unki qadamat irtebate Aruz
  - Mirza Ghalib ka kalam (Urdu-Farsi)
  - Mathnavi-e Arwatul Wasqi of Shahabi
  - Hindustan mai Mughlon se qabl farsi Adab
  - Khazain-ul Futuh az Amir Khosrau
  - Number of papers on Daqiqi and Qabusnama

== Origin of Urdu ==
Hafiz Mehmood Shirani is credited with the theory that Urdu was born in Punjab. He claimed that since Mahmud of Ghazni had conquered Lahore and Muslims stayed there for some 200 years before invading Delhi in 1193, Urdu must have taken shape during that period and, in a way, the Punjabi language gave birth to Urdu. The theory goes that the Muslims brought Urdu language from Punjab to Delhi with them.

Two centuries later, Sherani claimed that Muslim conquerors brought the language to Delhi with them. He listed some similarities between Urdu and Punjabi.

Shirani was not the first to reach this conclusion, preceded by linguists such as Suniti Kumar Chatterjee, T. Graham Bailey and Mohiuddin Qadri Zore. However Shirani was the first to deeply research the theory.

== Teacher ==
An article named ''Urdu Tahqeeq Ka Muallam e Awwal'' written by Muhammad Usman Butt, critically analyzed the contributions of Shirani in the field of Urdu linguistics and research.
