= Uniara Jagir =

Jagir under Jaipur

Uniara Jagir उनियारा
- Jagir of Kingdom of Amber
- 1638–1947
- Capital: Uniara
- Area
  - 1935: 971.246 km^{2} (375.000 sq mi)
- Population
  - 1935: 88,782
- History
  - Established: 1638
  - Accession to the Union of India: 1947
| Succeeded by |
| India |
- Today part of: Rajasthan, India

Uniara was a jagir under princely state of Jaipur.

== Area ==
The area of Uniara was approximately 375 square miles (971.246 km²). It comprised 177 villages. It was originally a small estate, but over the years, it was enlarged through subsequent grants.

== Geography ==
It was located approximately 70 miles south of Jaipur, between latitudes 25°40′ and 26°30′, and longitudes 75°30′ and 76°10′. It was bounded to the north and north-west by Tonk, to the south by Bundi, to the east by Tonk, and to the west by Jaipur and Bundi.

== Administration ==
The estate was divided into four tehsils, seven talukas, five police stations, and seven outposts for administrative purposes. It maintained its own contingent of 327 personnel and a police force of 192. The seat of administration was at Uniara.

== History ==
Bar Singh, the eldest son of Udaikaran and heir to the throne of Amber, took offense when his father became interested in a woman Bar Singh was meant to marry. He asked his father to marry her instead and relinquished his claim to the throne in favor of any offspring from that union. Narsingh, the son born from that marriage, succeeded to the throne of Amber after Udaikaran's death, while Bar Singh received an estate of 84 villages as his patrimony. Bar Singh’s son, Mairaj, was once in possession of Amber. However, his son, Naru, did not retain it. When Naru was supplanted by Chandra Sen in 1527, he returned to Mozabad. He had five sons: Dasa, Lala, Tejsi, Jeta, and Chitar. His descendants became known as the Naruka. Dasa was the eldest son of Naru. The descendants of Dasa are called the Dasawat and the Rao Raja of Uniara claims descent from him.

In the 14th or 15th century, the Uniara was under the control of the Sisodias, from whom the ancestor of the family took it through war. In 1638, Shah Jahan confirmed Chandrabhan's possession of Uniara. Uniara's ongoing disputes with the neighboring state of Tonk necessitated the maintenance of a strong military force. Uniara maintained fifteen forts, which were equipped with up to six large guns, seventeen small guns, and a garrison of 995 soldiers. Of all the feudatories of Jaipur, it had the largest army, consisting of 3,183 men.

== Revenue ==
The annual revenue of the estate was about Rs. 300,000 in 1935, out of which Rs. 38,440 was paid annually as tribute to Jaipur.

== Rulers ==
Rao Raja of Uniara belongs to the Kachhwaha clan of Rajputs and is the head of the Naruka branch of the family settled in Jaipur. Like the Maharaja of Alwar and the Thakur of Lawa, the Rao Raja claims descent from Naru, a great-grandson of Udaikaran, the ruler of Amber. Jai Singh II conferred the title of Rao and Madho Singh I that of Raja on the rulers of Uniara.

Succession was governed by the rule of lineal primogeniture. Upon the ruler's death, the eldest son would inherit the estate, and suitable provisions would be made for the younger sons. If the ruler left no heirs, the nearest relative in the line of succession would take his place.

=== List of rulers ===
Rulers were:

| Name | Reign Start | Reign End |
|---|---|---|
| Chandrabhan | 1638 | 1660 |
| Harji | | |
| Fateh Singh | | |
| Sangram Singh | | |
| Ajit Singh | | |
| Sardar Singh I | | 1778 |
| Bishan Singh | | |
| Bhim Singh | | |
| Fateh Singh | | |
| Sangram Singh | | 1886 |
| Guman Singh | 1886 | 1913 |
| Sardar Singh II | 1913 | 1947 |

=== Titular rulers ===
| Name | Reign Start | Reign End |
|---|---|---|
| Sardar Singh II | 1947 | 1969 |
| Rajendra Singh | 1969 | |

== Gallery ==
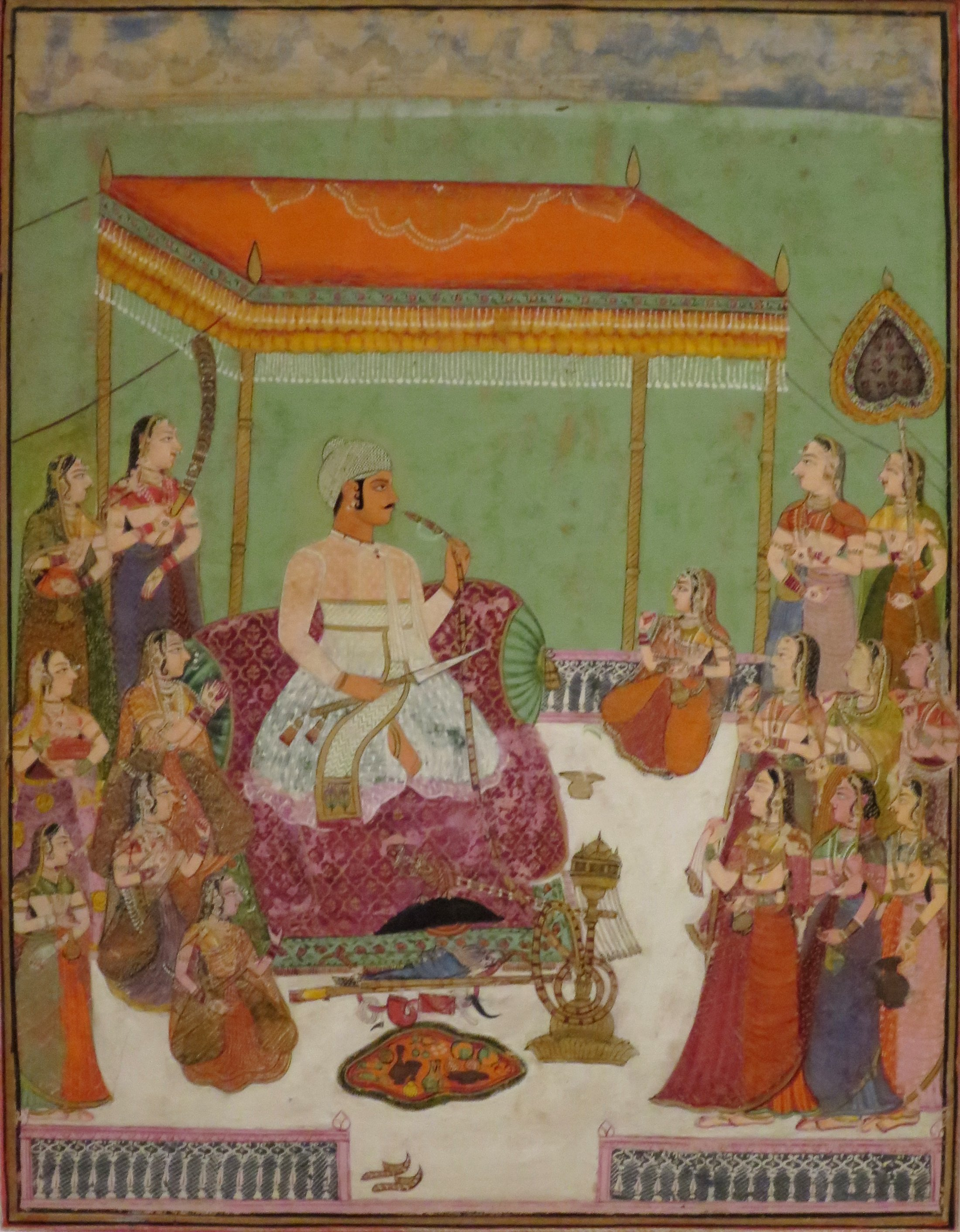
Rao Raja Bishan Singh of Uniara listening to musicians.

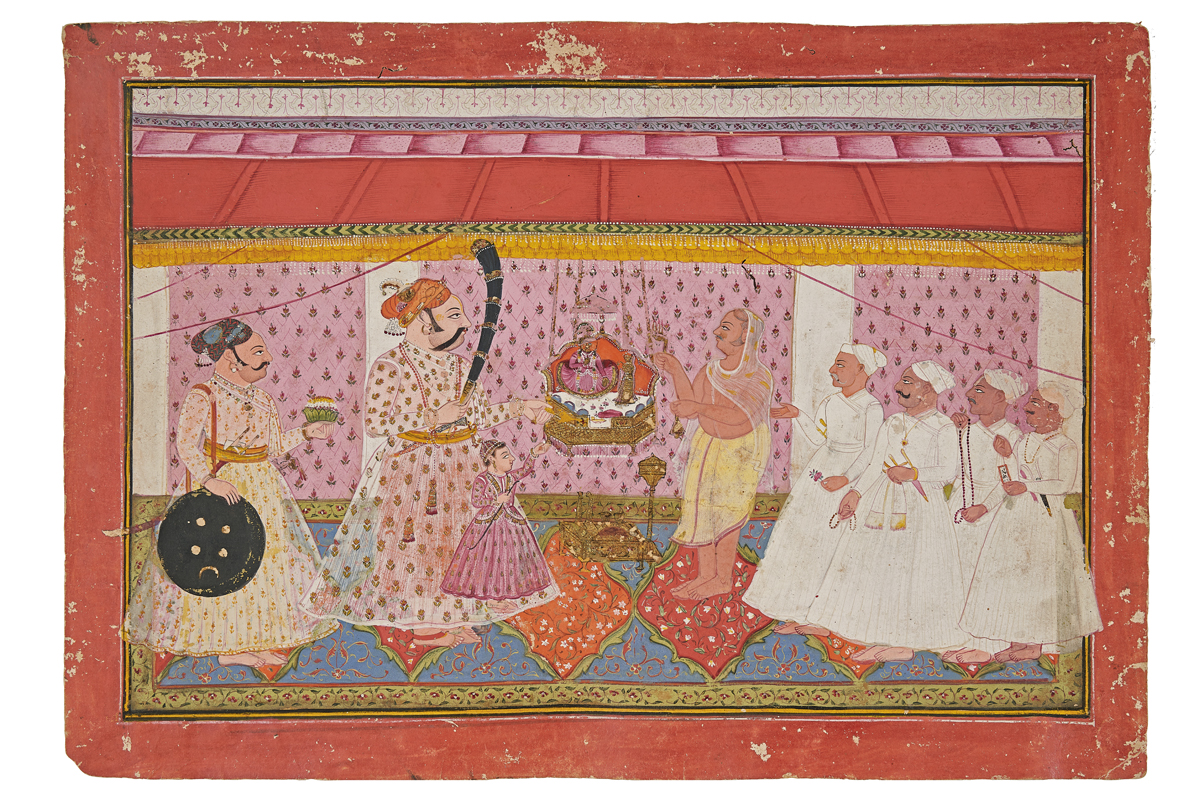
Rao Raja Sardar Singh of Uniara worshiping Lord Krishna.

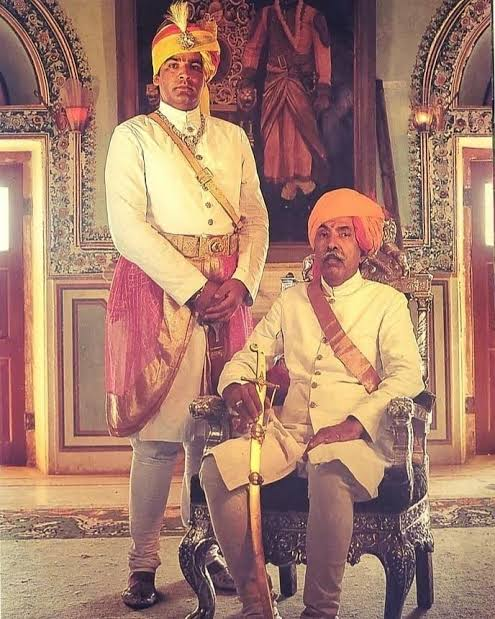
Rao Raja Rajendra Singh of Uniara with his son and successor Dalpat Singh.

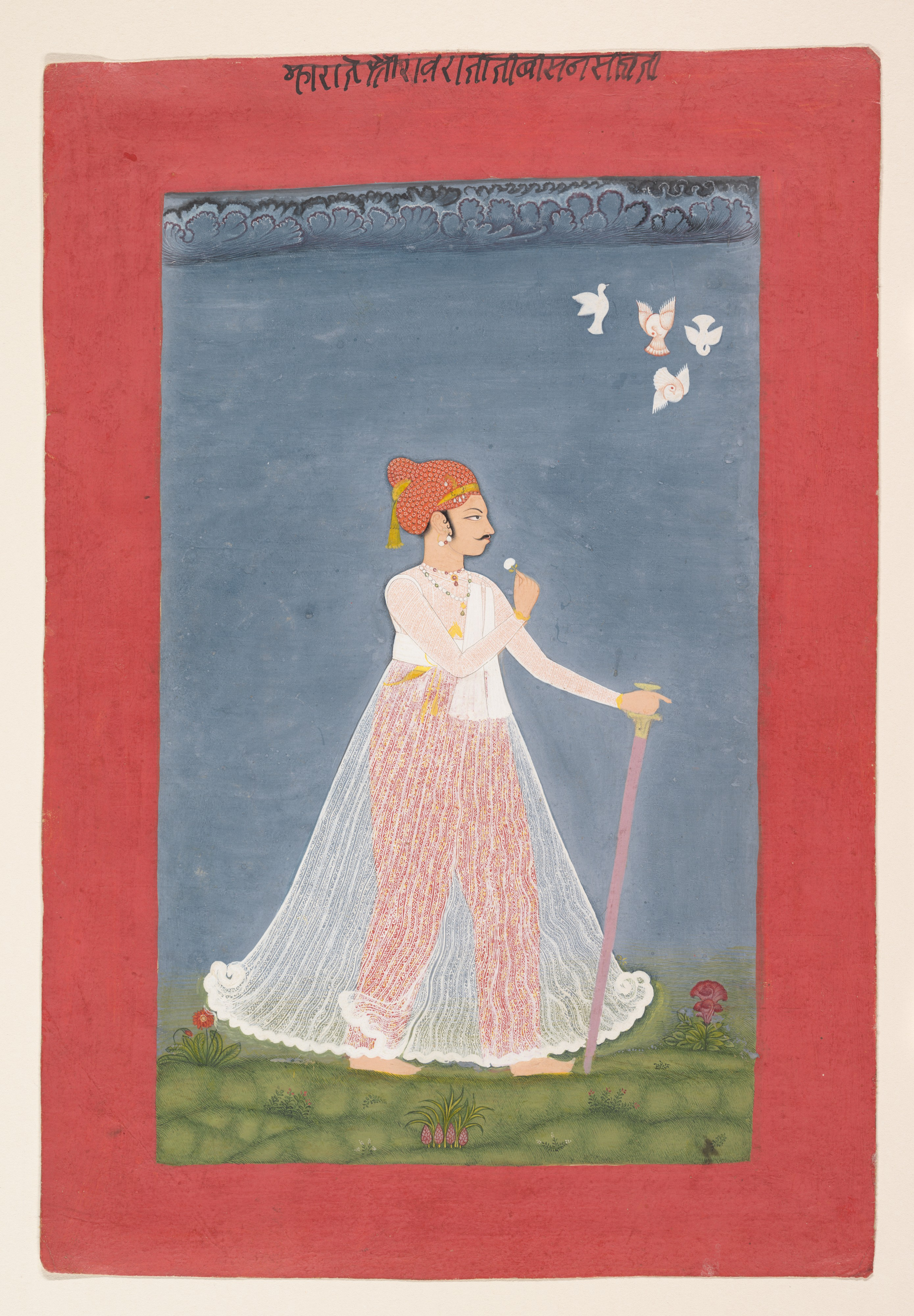
Rao Raja Bishan Singh of Uniara.
