= Manoharpura =

- village
- Nickname: bagri ki dhani
- Interactive map of Manoharpura
- Country: India
- State: Rajasthan
- District: Tonk
- Founder: Naaga bagri

Government
  - Body: Gram panchayat

Area
  - Total: 583.86 ha (1,442.7 acres)

Population
  - Total: 866
  - Density: 148/km^{2} (384/sq mi)

Languages
  - Official: Hindi
- Time zone: UTC+5:30 (IST)
- ISO 3166 code: RJ-IN
- Vehicle registration: RJ-26
- Coastline: 0 kilometres (0 mi)

Manoharpura is a village in the Tonk district of Rajasthan, India, near the River Mashi. The village is near the Jodhpuriya temple of the Hindu deity Devnarayan.
