= Azeem Akhtar =

Indian cricketer (born 1991)

Azeem Ameen Akhtar
Personal information
- Full name: Azeem Ameen Akhtar
- Born: 8 December 1991 (age 34); Tonk, India
- Batting: Right-handed
- Role: Wicketkeeper

Domestic team information
- Years: Team
- 2013–2014: Rajasthan
- Source: ESPNcricinfo, 20 April 2023

Azeem Ameen Akhtar (born 8 December 1991) is an Indian first-class cricketer who plays for Rajasthan. He made his first-class debut for Rajasthan in the 2013-14 Ranji Trophy on 30 December 2013.
