= Diggi =

- Village
- Location within Rajasthan Location within India
- Coordinates: 26°22′40″N 75°26′16″E
- Country: India
- State: Rajasthan
- District: Tonk

Population (2011)
  - Total: 11,070

Demographics
  - Literacy: 66.13%
  - Sex ratio: 944

Diggi village is in Malpura tehsil of Tonk district, Rajasthan, India.
