= Shri Kalyan Temple =

Diggi Kalyan Ji Temple
- श्री डिग्गी कल्याण जी मंदिर
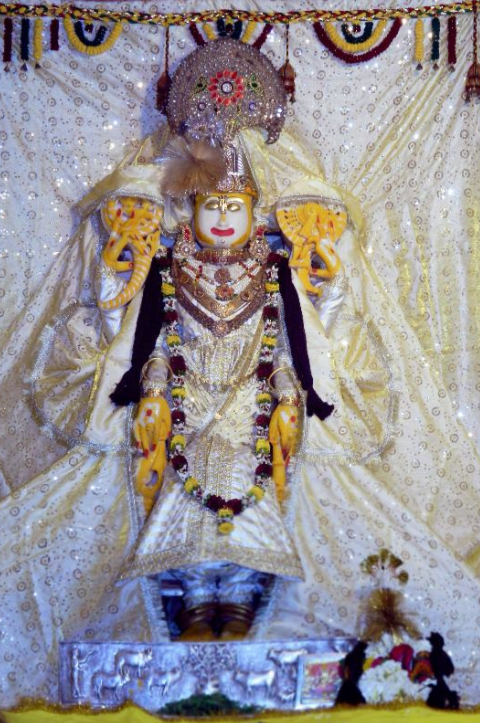
- Kalyanji Temple, Diggi

- Location in Rajasthan, India

Religion
- Affiliation: Hinduism
- District: Tonk
- Deity: Vishnu (Kalyanji)
- Festivals: Vaishakh Purnima, Shravan Ekadashi, Amavasya, Jal Jhulni Ekadashi

Location
- Location: Diggi, Malpura tehsil
- State: Rajasthan
- Country: India
- Coordinates: 26.3781443°N 75.4372723°E

Architecture
- Creator: King Digva (mythological)
- Completed: Reconstructed in 1527 CE

Shri Diggi Kalyan Ji Temple is a Hindu temple to Vishnu in Diggi town of Malpura tehsil, Tonk district, Rajasthan, India.

It is traditionally associated with beliefs regarding the healing of skin ailments. It is a local custom for devotees to bathe with or consume the water used for the deity's rituals, which is believed to possess curative properties.

== Pilgrimage ==
The temple is a destination for regular padayatras (pilgrimages on foot), particularly from Jaipur and nearby regions. Annual padayatras, including the Lakhi Padayatra, are organised, with participants traveling barefoot to the temple.

== See also ==
- Tonk district
