= Peeplu =

- City
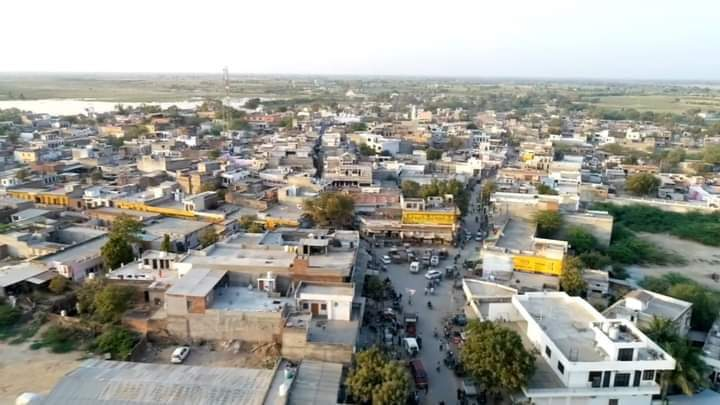
- Aerial View of Peeplu

- Location within Rajasthan
- Coordinates: 26.3014936°N 75.7109746°E
- Country: India
- State: Rajasthan
- District: Tonk

Government
  - Type: Nagar Palika
  - Body: Peeplu Nagar Palika

Population (2011)
  - City: 6,407
  - Rural: 117,644

Language
  - Official: Hindi
- Time zone: UTC+5:30 (IST)
- PIN: 304801
- Vehicle registration: RJ 26

Peeplu is a City with Municipality in Rajasthan State of India. Peeplu serves as the Tehsil and Sub Division, with 126 villages. It belongs to the Tonk District and Ajmer Division. It is 20 km from the National Highway 52 (Jaipur to Kota section), 70 km from Jaipur and 18 km from Tonk District.

== Good Governance ==
National Recognition and Anganwadi Success (2025)

In April 2025, the Peeplu block achieved national prominence when Prime Minister Narendra Modi publicly lauded its success story during his keynote address at the 17th Civil Services Day event held at Vigyan Bhawan, New Delhi. Speaking on the impact of the central government's Aspirational Blocks Programme (ABP); which was launched in January 2023 to uplift underdeveloped regions; the Prime Minister explicitly cited Peeplu as a nationwide benchmark for grassroots developmental turnaround. In his speech, Modi stated:

Two years ago, child measurement efficiency at Anganwadi Centres in the Peeplu block of Tonk, Rajasthan, was just 20 percent. Today, it has soared to over 99 percent.

— Narendra Modi, Vigyan Bhavan, New Delhi

Modi lauded this achievement as definitive proof of how data-driven decisions, a clear administrative direction, and local dedication could combat child malnutrition and outperform state averages. Furthermore, Peeplu’s success story was officially featured in the central government's e-coffee table book on Prime Minister’s Awards for Excellence in Public Administration, documenting how the local administration, under District Collector Dr. Saumya Jha, utilized AI-driven tracking, regular field inspections, and targeted nutritional training to secure the turnaround. The administrative and healthcare teams in Peeplu achieved a landmark milestone by recording a success and improvement rate of over 99.94% in tracking and maintaining children's growth metrics, specifically height and weight efficiency, across local Anganwadi centers. This achievement placed the Tonk district and the Peeplu block as a model exemplar nationwide for effective grassroots implementation of healthcare tracking, earning commendation from the highest levels of the union government for its data-driven progress in combating child malnutrition.

== Religion ==
Religions in Peeplu
Hinduism	92.03%
Islam	6.79%
Jainism	1.09%
others	0.09%

The majority of the population of Peeplu is Hindu. Just around 7 percent are Muslim, and only around 1 percent are Jainist or follow another religion.
