= Jeet Ram Dudi =

Indian politician

Member of the Rajasthan Legislative Assembly
- In office 1993–1998
- Constituency: Malpura, Rajasthan
- In office 2003–2008
- Constituency: Malpura, Rajasthan

Personal details
- Born: Jeet Ram; 16 March 1953 (age 73) Teja Khera, Sirsa, Haryana
- Party: Bharatiya Janata Party

Jeetram Dudi (born 16 March 1953) also known as Jeet Ram is an Indian politician. He was elected to the Rajasthan Legislative Assembly from Malpura, Tonk in 1993 and 1998. He is a member of the Bharatiya Janata Party.
