= Malpura Assembly constituency =

Legislative Assembly constituency in Rajasthan State, India

Coordinates: 26.29°N 75.38°E

Malpura
- Constituency No. 94 for the Rajasthan Legislative Assembly

Constituency details
- Country: India
- Region: North India
- State: Rajasthan
- District: Tonk
- Lok Sabha constituency: Tonk-Sawai Madhopur
- Established: 2008
- Total electors: 271,358
- Reservation: None

Member of Legislative Assembly
- 16th Rajasthan Legislative Assembly
- Incumbent Kanhaiya Lal Choudhary
- Party: Bharatiya Janata Party

Malpura Assembly constituency is one of the 200 Legislative Assembly constituencies of Rajasthan state in India.

It comprises Malpura tehsil, and parts of Todaraisingh tehsil, both in Tonk district. As of 2023, its representative is Kanhiya Lal of the Bharatiya Janata Party.

== Members of the Legislative Assembly ==
Election	Name	Party
1998	Surendra Vyas	Independent
2003	Jeetram	Bharatiya Janata Party
2008	Ranveer Pahalwan	Independent
2013	Kanhiya Lal	Bharatiya Janata Party
2018	Kanhiya Lal	Bharatiya Janata Party
2023	Kanhiya Lal	Bharatiya Janata Party

== Election results ==
=== 2023 ===
2023 Rajasthan Legislative Assembly election: Malpura
Party	Candidate	Votes	%	±%
BJP	Kanhaiyalal	85,915	41.22	−10.88
INC	Ghasi Lal Choudhary	69,726	33.45	
Independent	Gopal Gurjar	48,184	23.12	
BSP	Jitendra Kumar	1,927	0.92	−4.58
NOTA	None of the above	1,816	0.87	−0.14
Majority		16,189	7.77	−8.88
Turnout		208,431	76.81	+3.83
BJP hold		Swing		

=== 2018 ===
Rajasthan Legislative Assembly Election, 2018: Malpura
Party	Candidate	Votes	%	±%
BJP	Kanhiya Lal	93,237	52.1	
RLD	Ranveer Phalwan	63,451	35.45	
BSP	Narendra Singh Aamli	9,836	5.5	
Independent	Jeetram	2,722	1.52	
NOTA	None of the above	1,801	1.01	
Majority		29,786	16.65	
Turnout		178,970	72.98	

== See also ==
- List of constituencies of the Rajasthan Legislative Assembly
- Tonk district
