= Magra sheep =

Breed of sheep

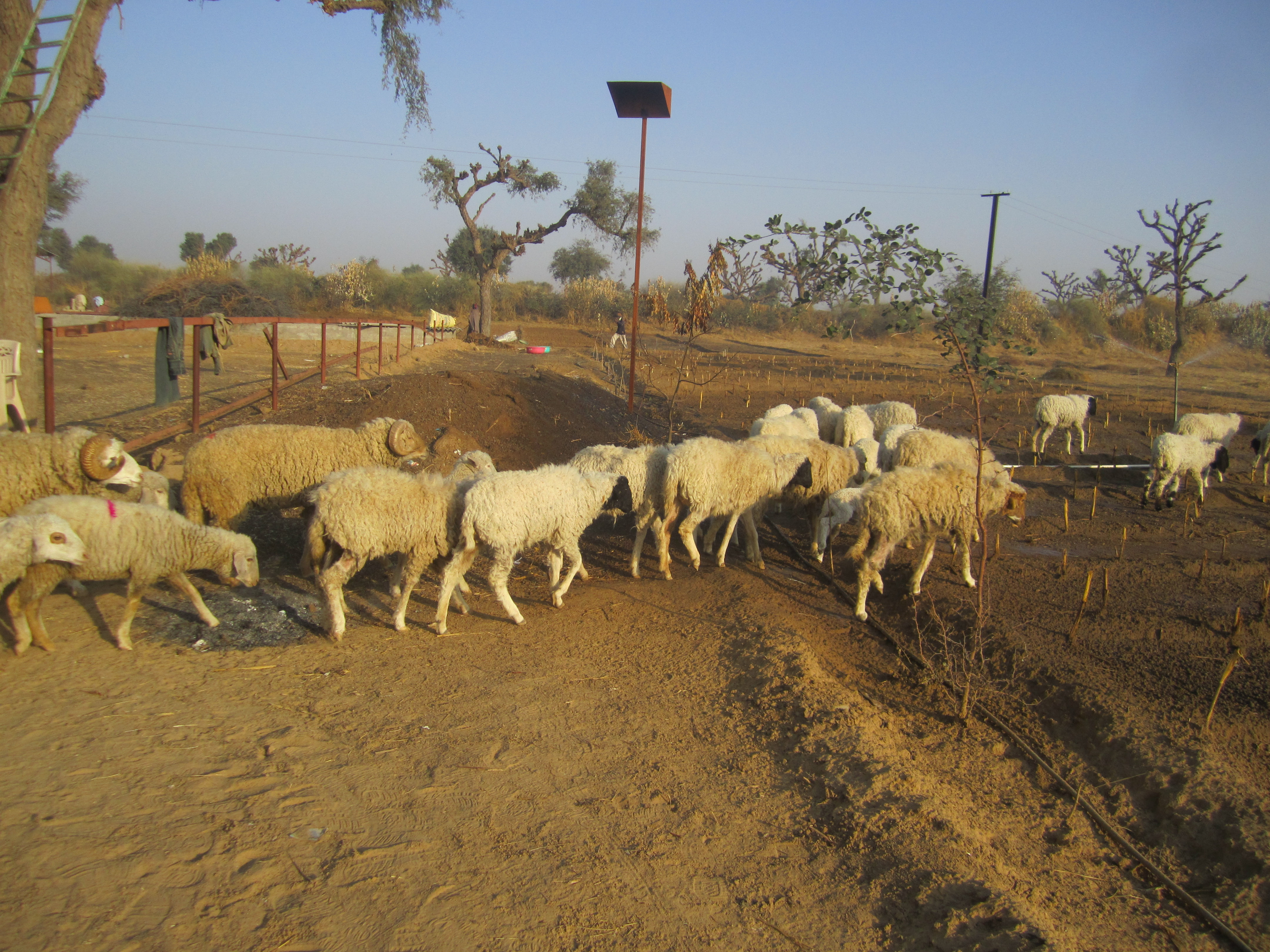
Magra Sheep Flock

The Magra sheep, also known as Bikaneri Chokhla or Chakri and formerly known as the Bikaneri, is a breed of sheep that is found in the Bikaner, Nagaur, Jaisalmer and Churu districts of Rajasthan, India. However, purebreds are only found in the eastern and southern parts of the Bikaner district.

== Significance ==
The Magra sheep is known as the only lustrous carpet wool-producing breed. The most important strain of Magra has flocks with extremely white and lustrous fleece, which can only be found in a few villages around Bikaner. A breeding program aims to improve this breed through selection.

The breeders, wool traders, and industrialists in Bikaner have expressed serious concern at the rapid decline in numbers of Magra sheep. Moreover, the number of purebreds is decreasing due to cross-breeding with other breeds in the area, and consequently there is a serious need for conservation.
