= Tonk district =

Coordinates: 26°09′48″N 75°47′13″E

- District of Rajasthan
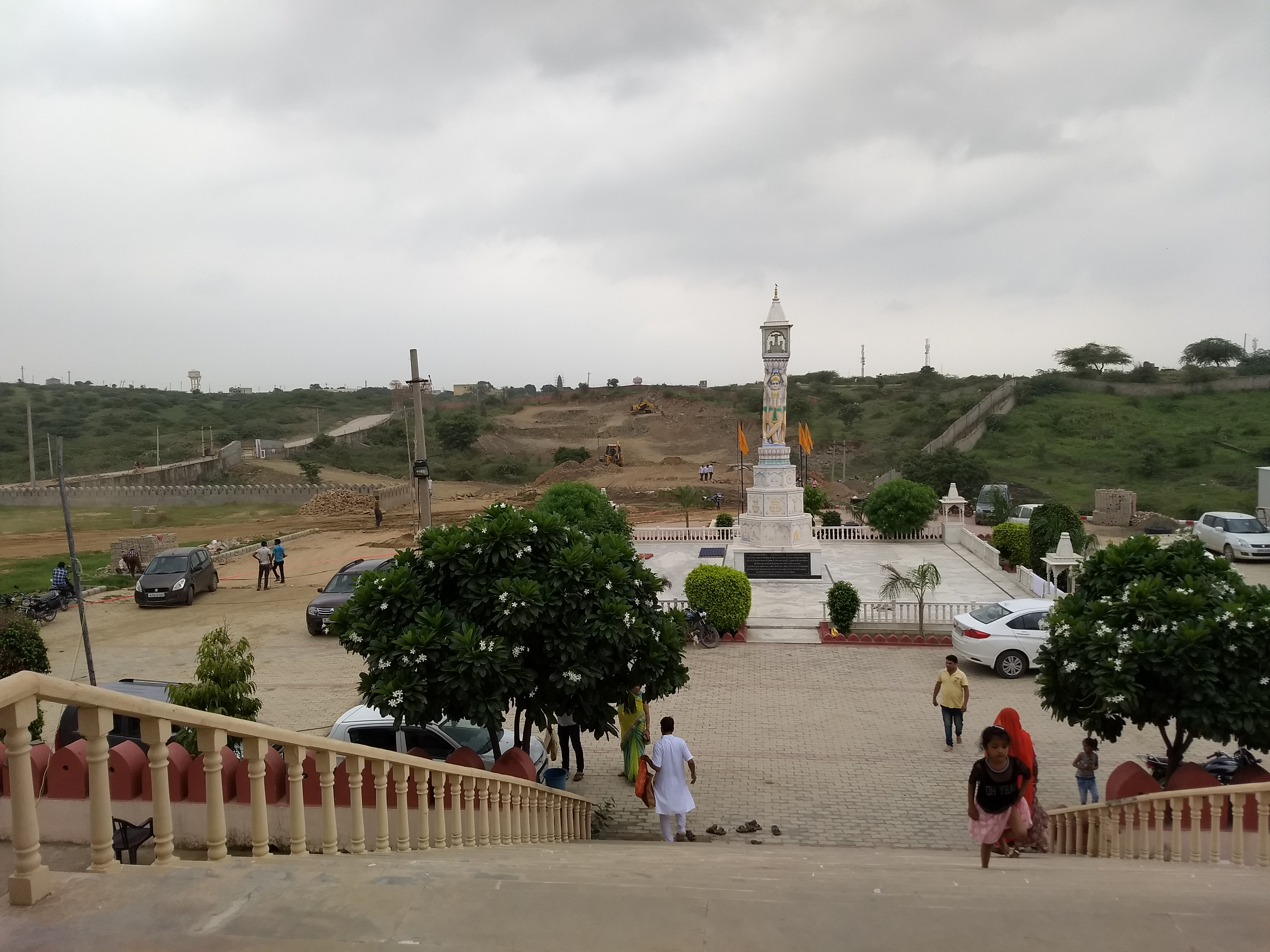
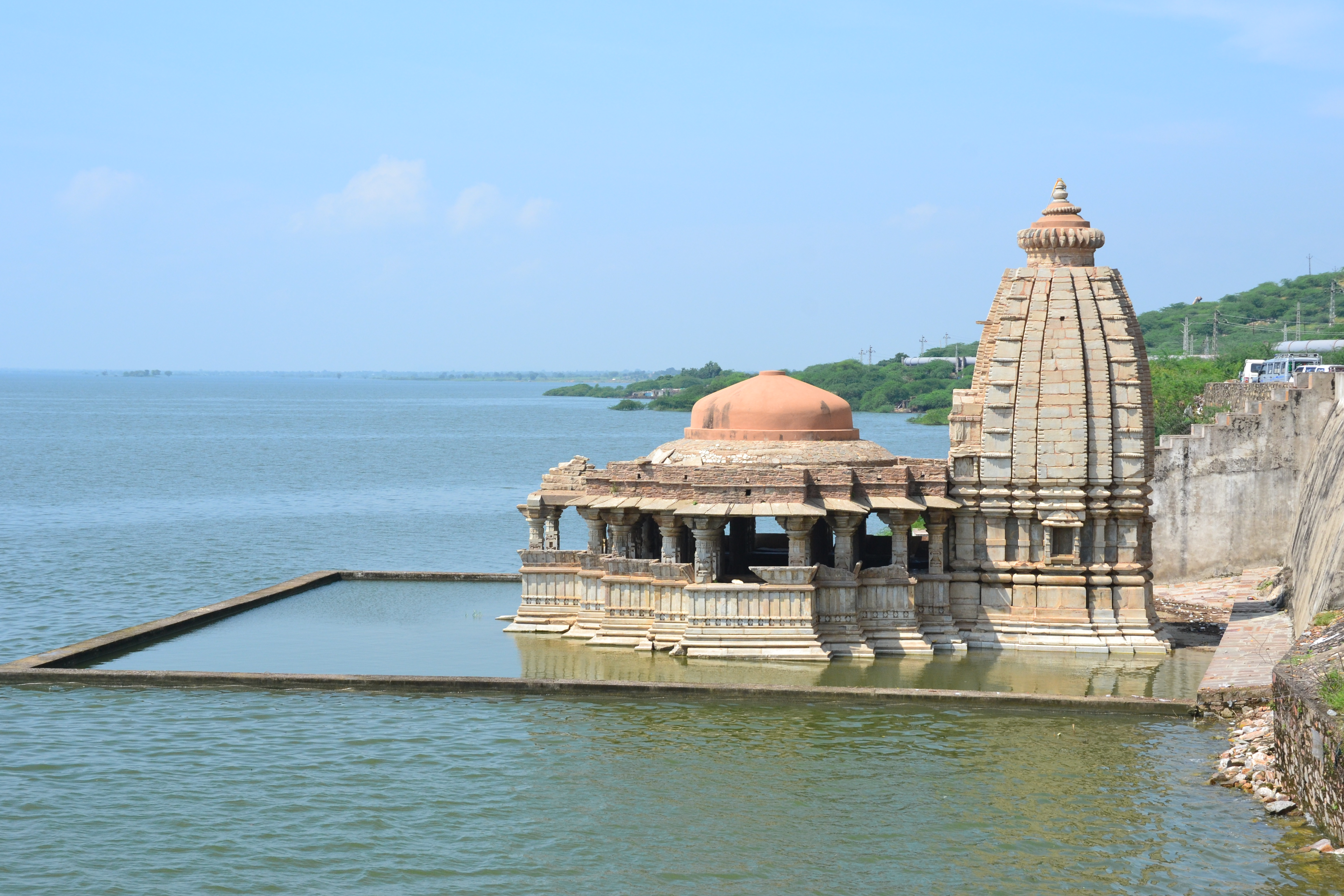
- Top: Sudarshanoday Teerth Kshetra, Anwa; Bottom: Bisaldeo temple

- Location of Tonk district in Rajasthan
- Country: India
- State: Rajasthan
- Division: Ajmer
- Headquarters: Tonk

Government
  - Zila Pramukh: Saroj Bansal

Area
  - Total: 7,194 km^{2} (2,778 sq mi)

Population (2011)
  - Total: 1,421,326
  - Density: 197.6/km^{2} (511.7/sq mi)
- Time zone: UTC+05:30 (IST)
- Website: tonk.rajasthan.gov.in

Tonk district is a district of the state of Rajasthan in western India. The city of Tonk is the administrative headquarters of the district. The district is bounded on the north by Jaipur district, on the east by Sawai Madhopur district, on the southeast by Kota district, on the south by Bundi district, on the southwest by Bhilwara district, and on the west by Ajmer district.

== History ==
It was built in the 12th century by a Brahmin Tunkau, from whom it came to be known as Tunk and later Tonk. According to another version, the town was built by a Brahman called Bhola in 1643

== Geography ==
Tonk is on National Highway 52, 100 km from Jaipur. It is in the northeastern part of the state between 75.19' and 76.16 East longitude and 25.41' and 26.24' North latitude. The total area is 7194 km2 (as per 2002-03).

It is one of the four districts headquarters of Rajasthan state that are not directly connected with rail. The nearest railway station, Newai, is within the district but is 30 km from the district headquarters. Banas River flows through the district.

The district is notable for the Tonk meteorite, a rare carbonaceous chondrite meteorite that fell in 1911.

== Economy ==
In 2006, the Ministry of Panchayati Raj named Tonk one of the country's 250 most backward districts (out of 640). It is one of the 12 districts in Rajasthan receiving funds from the Backward Regions Grant Fund (BRGF).

== Divisions ==
Tonk has 9 tehsils and 7 sub-divisions. The 9 tehsils are Deoli, Malpura, Newai, Todaraisingh, Tonk, Peeplu, Uniara, Dooni and Nagarfort. The 7 sub-divisions are Deoli, Malpura, Newai, Todaraisingh, Tonk, Peeplu and Aligarh (Uniara). Tonk is Nagar-Parishad while Deoli, Malpura, Newai, Todaraisingh and Uniara are Nagar-Palikas. There were 1093 villages in the district according to the 2001 census.At this time new tehsil add dooni

== Notable sights ==
- Rairh
- Shahi Jama Masjid
- Bisalpur Dam
- Bisaldeo Temple
- Diggi Kalyan Ji Mandir
- Hadi Rani Ka Kund
- Hathi Bhata
- Rasiya Ke Tekri
- Shivaji Park
- Sunehri Kothi
- Maulana Abul Kalam Azad Arabic and Persian Research Institute (APRI)

== Culture ==
=== Notable personalities ===
- Ajit Singh Mehta
- Banwari Lal Bairwa
- Masood Ahmed Barkati
- Gulubhai Jasdanwalla
- Karpoor Chandra Kulish
- Kailash Chandra Meghwal
- Chhavi Rajawat
- Jeet Ram
- Prabhu Lal Saini
- Hiralal Shastri
- Akhtar Sheerani
- Hafiz Mehmood Khan Shirani
- Wali Hasan Tonki
- Manikya Lal Verma
- khaleel Ahmad
- Azeem Akhtar
- Irrfan Khan

== Demographics ==
Historical population
Year	Pop.	±% p.a.
1901	260,801	—
1911	276,428	+0.58%
1921	255,216	−0.80%
1931	297,275	+1.54%
1941	329,790	+1.04%
1951	406,921	+2.12%
1961	497,729	+2.03%
1971	625,830	+2.32%
1981	783,635	+2.27%
1991	975,006	+2.21%
2001	1,211,671	+2.20%
2011	1,421,326	+1.61%

Religions in residual Tonk district (2011)
Religion	Percent
Hinduism	86.78%
Islam	11.45%
Jainism	1.61%
Other or not stated	0.16%

According to the 2011 census, Tonk district has a population of 1,421,326, roughly equal to the nation of Timor-Leste or the US state of Hawaii. This gives it a ranking of 347th in India (out of 640). The district has a population density of 198 inhabitants per square kilometre (510/sq mi). Its population growth rate over the decade 2001-2011 was 17.33%. Tonk has a sex ratio of 949 females for every 1000 males and a literacy rate of 62.46%. 22.35% of the population lives in urban areas. Scheduled Castes and Scheduled Tribes make up 20.26% and 12.54% of the population respectively.

After division the district has a population of 1,274,456. The residual sex ratio is 951 females per 1000 males. 294,164 (23.08%) live in urban areas. Scheduled Castes and Scheduled Tribes made up 257,521 (20.21%) and 167,476 (13.14%) of the population respectively.

Languages of residual Tonk district (2011)
1. Dhundhari (36.6%)
2. Rajasthani (29.1%)
3. Hindi (29.0%)
4. Urdu (4.12%)
5. Others (1.10%)

At the time of the 2011 Census of India, 36.65% of the population in the district spoke Dhundhari, 29.11% Rajasthani, 29.02% Hindi and 4.12% Urdu as their first language.

== Villages ==
- Chandlai
- Parasiya
- Samrawata
- dooni
