= Hakim Syed Ali Ahmad Nayyar Wasty =

Practitioner of Eastern System of Medicine

Professor Hakim Syed Ali Ahmad Nayyar Wasty (1901–1982) was a Pakistani scholar of the history of medicine, and a hakeem (practitioner of Tibb/Eastern System of Medicine).

== Life ==
Upon completion of his education in eastern systems of medicine from academies in British India, he moved to Lahore (now in Pakistan) after the independence of Pakistan. He traveled extensively throughout Europe and the Middle East, lectured at foreign universities, mastered several languages, and wrote numerous books on his specialized field of medicine.

== Awards and recognition ==
- Recognized for his services by Government of Pakistan, he was awarded the "Sitara-e-Khidmat" (Star of Service) Award in 1961.
- Shah of Iran gave him an award for his work in the Persian language.

== Career and legacy ==
Additionally, for his contribution to promoting relations between Pakistan and Turkey, the Turkish Government appointed him as its Honorary Consul General in Lahore, Pakistan. Subsequently, he served as a member of the Federal Advisory Council to the President of Pakistan. Professor Wasty was also a member of the Pakistani parliament (Majlis-e-Shura), also called National Assembly of Pakistan.

His biography, Nayyar-e-Hikmat was published in 2010. At the book launching event in Islamabad in 2011, many speakers paid tributes to him and noted that he was a God-fearing man but followed no sect, and always identified himself only as a Muslim. In his practice of medicine, they noted, he had a habit of charging money for his services from the affluent businessmen and feudal landowners but treating the poor for free and providing them free medicines. Among the speakers was Assef Ahmad Ali, a former Education minister and member of National Assembly of Pakistan.

Assef Ahmad Ali is further quoted as saying by a major newspaper of Pakistan, "These are the kind of people who represented what was best about Muslim India".

== Books ==
- Nayyar-e-Hikmat, a book on the life and works of Hakim Nayyar Wasti, written by Asifa Waheed (2011).
