= Uniara =

- Town
- Nickname: Bada Uniara
- Location in Rajasthan, India
- Coordinates: 25.92°N 76.02°E.
- Country: India
- State: Rajasthan
- District: Tonk
- Elevation: 266 m (873 ft)

Population (2001)
  - Total: 10,827

Languages
  - Official: Hindi
- Time zone: UTC+5:30 (IST)
- Postal code: 304024
- ISO 3166 code: IN-RJ
- Vehicle registration: RJ-26

Uniara is a town and a municipality in Tonk district in the Indian state of Rajasthan. It is a tehsil of the Tonk district.

== History ==
Uniara was a jagir under the rule of Jaipur.

== Geography ==
Galwa dam, the eighth largest dam in Rajasthan, is three kilometers from Uniara. Uniara has major forest areas situated along the Aravalli Range passing through the major towns of Banetha and Kakod. The Banas River is a major river passing through the city. Major towns include Banetha, Kakod, Nagarfort, and Aligarh.

The district headquarters of Tonk is 36 km away.

Uniara is near Ranthambhore National Park.

== Culture ==
Tourist attractions include Kheda village, near Kakod. Kheda hosts a life-sized elephant carved of stone. In addition to the Heritage Palace at Uniara, the city has large historical Hindu and Jain temples. Uniara Fort is noted for its architecture.

== Transport ==
Uniara is located on National Highway No. 552.

The nearest railway station is Sawai Madhopur, 39 km away, and the nearest airport is Jaipur, 136 km away.

Uniara is connected to Tonk, Sawai Madhopur, Jaipur, Kota, Bundi and Ajmer by road.

== Demographics ==
As of 2001 India census, Uniara had a population of around 15,827, 51 percent male and 49 percent female. The average literacy rate is 56%, lower than the national average of 59.5%. Male literacy is higher at 70 percent, compared to female literacy at 42 percent. 16 percent of the population is under six years of age. Meenas, Gurjar, Mali, Rajputs, and Jains are the major castes.

== Rajasthan School of Painting ==
Uniara had an important school of Indian painting in the 18th century that was an offshoot of the Bundi school. Prominent painters, who served under the ruler Sirdar Singh, included Dhano and Mira Bagas (Mir Baksh).

== Economy ==
Uniara's economy is based on agriculture. Galwa Dam is a major source of irrigation and provides water for most of the area of the tehsil. Mustard, urad beans and moongs are major crops cultivated in tehsil. The mining of sands and stone also contributes to the local economy.
