= Marwari sheep =

Indian breed of sheep

Marwari
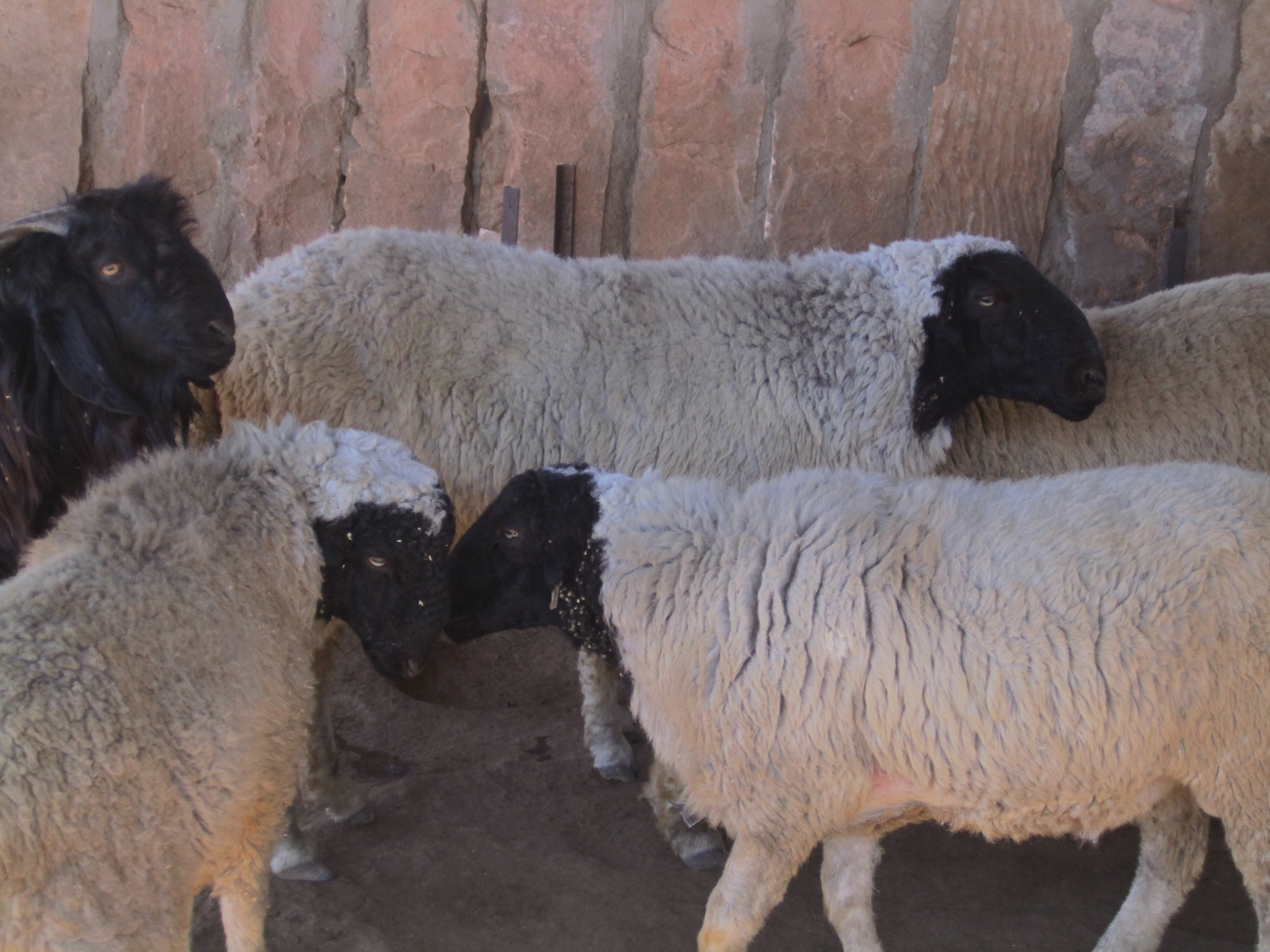
- Conservation status: FAO (2007): not at risk
- Other names: Marwadi (in northern Gujarat); Layda
- Country of origin: India
- Distribution: Marwar region, Rajasthan; Ajmer District, Rajasthan; Udaipur District, Rajasthan
- Use: wool

Traits
- Weight: Male: 31 kg; Female: 26 kg
- Height: Male: 62 cm; Female: 59 cm
- Wool colour: white
- Face colour: black
- Horn status: hornless in both sexes

The Marwari is an Indian breed of domestic sheep. It originates in, and is named for, the Marwar region of south-western Rajasthan, in the north-west of India. It is reared in the five principal districts of Marwar – Barmer, Jalore, Jodhpur, Nagaur and Pali – and also in some neighbouring districts of Rajasthan and Gujarat.

== Characteristics ==
The Marwari is a small sheep, standing approximately 60 cm at the withers. It has white body and a black face. It is a polled breed – both sexes are without horns. The ears are unusually small, and are tubular in shape.

== Use ==
The Marwari is raised for its wool, which is of coarse or carpet quality. Fleeces weigh about 1.8 kg on average.
