= Todaraisingh =

Todaraisingh Toda
- City
- Location in Rajasthan, India Todaraisingh (India)
- Coordinates: 26.0167°N 75.4833°E
- Country: India
- State: Rajasthan
- District: Kekri

Government
  - Type: Bharatiya Janata Party

Area
  - Total: 10 km^{2} (3.9 sq mi)

Population (2011)
  - Total: 23,559
  - Density: 2,400/km^{2} (6,100/sq mi)

Languages
  - Official: Hindi
- Time zone: UTC+5:30 (IST)
- PIN: 304505
- Vehicle registration: RJ-26-XXXX

Todaraisingh is a town and the tehsil headquarters of Tonk district in the Indian state of Rajasthan. Banas River flows adjacent to it. It is of immense importance to the Rajasthan's art and heritage. Todaraisingh is often simply called Toda by local residents.

== Ancient Names ==
Historically, Todaraisingh was known by various names, including Takshakgiri, Takshakgadha, Takshakpur, Todapattan, and Ishtikapur.

== History ==
The town is believed to have been established during the 4th century by the Nagas. It was later ruled by the Yuhilas of Chatsu and the Chauhans of Ajmer. During the 15th and 16th centuries, it served as the capital for the Solanki Rajputs. The town is named after Rai Singh Sisodia, a notable figure who served as a court noble under Mughal Emperor Shah Jahan.

=== Solanki History ===
According to local tradition, in 593 AD (651 Vikram Samvat), Rao Rai Singh Solanki founded Todaraisingh. Rai Singh had two sons: Jai Dev Solanki, who later came to be known as Jai Dada Dev, and Dharamdev Singh Solanki. Jai Dev Solanki is said to have lived as an ascetic for 120 years, meditating on a stone slab in the forest. In 781 AD (838 Vikram Samvat), Rao Karam Chand Solanki, a descendant of Dharamdev Singh, along with other members of the community, migrated to Palam village near Delhi. The descendants later established a temple known as Dada Dev Mandir in Palam.

=== Solanki Dynasty Lineage ===
- Rao Rai Singh Solanki – founder of Todaraisingh (593 AD) - Fulwati – wife of Rao Rai Singh Solanki - Jai Dev Solanki (Jai Dada Dev) – elder son of Rao Rai Singh Solanki - Dharamdev Solanki – younger son of Rao Rai Singh Solanki - Karamchand Solanki – son of Dharamdev Solanki - Panmeshwar Kaur – wife of Karamchand Solanki - Kunwar Sheoraj Singh – son of Karamchand Solanki

=== Monuments of the Solanki Rulers ===
Several forts and stepwells were constructed by the Solanki dynasty in and around Todaraisingh. The samadhi (memorial) of Jai Dev Solanki and a stepwell covering approximately 2.5 acres are located in the area. The stone slab on which Jai Dev Solanki is believed to have meditated was later transported to Palam village by his descendants.

== Demographics ==
As of 2011 India census, Todaraisingh had a population of 23,559. Males constitute 52% of the population and females 48%. Todaraisingh has an average literacy rate of 57%, lower than the national average of 59.5%. Male literacy stands at 70%, while female literacy lags behind at 42%. In Todaraisingh, 19% of the population is under 6 years of age. The town is primarily Hindu.

== Tourism ==
Todaraisingh contains over 50 historic temples, including the Shree Adinath Bhagwan Temple, which houses an ancient idol of Adinath Bhagwan. The town has historical monuments such as a palace estimated to be around 300 years old. Todaraisingh is locally known for four features: *ghatti* (used in flour mills), *patti* (used in construction), *bawdi* (stepwells), and *dawdi* (a term referring to local women).

In earlier times, Todaraisingh was considered comparable to other regional centers of power. Important sites in the town include Shree Kileshwar Mahadev Temple, Pipaji Cave, Aam Sagar, Naharsingh Mata Temple, and Budh Sagar. Surrounded by hills, Todaraisingh is located in the Tonk district and is regarded as a town of archaeological significance. Other places of interest include Kushal Bag, Hadi Rani ki Baori (a stepwell), Raja Rai Singh's Mahal, Isar Baori, Bhopat Baori, and the temples of Kalyanji, Raghoraiji, Gopinathji, and Govinddeoji.

The Bijolia inscription of Vikram Samvat 1226 mentions Toda Rai Singh as a prominent center of Jainism. Nearby, the Hathi-Bhata (Stone Elephant) is a carved stone structure larger than a real elephant, located approximately 30 km from Tonk on the Tonk–Sawai Madhopur road.
