= Dhundari language =

Indo-Aryan language spoken in India

Dhundhari
- ढूंढाड़ी
- Native to: India
- Region: Dhundhar
- Native speakers: 1,476,446 (2011 census)
- Language family: Indo-European: Indo-Iranian; Indo-Aryan; Western; Rajasthani; Dhundhari
- Writing system: Devanagari

Language codes
- ISO 639-3: dhd
- Glottolog: dhun1238

Dhundhari (ढूंढाड़ी), also known as Jaipuri, is a Indo-Aryan language variety of the Rajasthani languages group. It is spoken in the Dhundhar region of northeastern Rajasthan state, India. Dhundari-speaking people are found in four districts – Jaipur, Sawai Madhopur, Dausa, Tonk and some parts of Sikar, Karauli and Gangapur District.

With some 1.5 million speakers, it is not the largest speaking language variety in Rajasthan, though fairly used in the regions mentioned above. Dhundhari is spoken widely in and around Jaipur.

MacAlister completed the grammatical analysis on 24 February 1884. Books on Jain philosophy, such as Moksha Marga Prakashak, have been written in Dhundari by Acharya Kalpa Pt. Todarmalji. The Serampore missionaries translated the New Testament into Jaipuri proper in 1815.

== Etymology ==
It is called Dhundhari as it was mainly spoken in the Dhundhar region. The state was divided into-Marwar, Mewar, Dhundhar, Hadoti, and Vagad. These divisions were based on culture and language. Now there is no such division and the districts which fall in that region are the ones listed above. Most of the Dhundhari-speaking population is in Jaipur and hence, the name Jaipuri.

The derivation of the name ‘Dhundhari’ is thought to be from two origins.

1. According to the first opinion, Dhundhari is believed to have drawn its name from the Dhundh or Dhundhakriti mountain, which is situated near Jobner in Jaipur District or in the West frontier of the State.
2. The other opinion is that it is named after a river called Dhundh flowing through this region. Hence the name became Dhundhar. This tract is the place lying to the southeast of the range of the hills forming the boundary between Shekhawati and Jaipur.

== Geographical Distribution ==
Dhundhari is primarily spoken in the state of Rajasthan. Mewati is another dialect of Rajasthani to the northeast, which assumes the form of Braja Bhasha in Bharatpur. Mewati is actually the language of the former Mewat, the abode of the Meos in Dang is a further sub-dialect of Braja Bhasa in Karauli and that of Bundeli and Malvi in Jhalawar and the southern parts of Kota. Similarly, Ahirwati (also known as Hīrwāṭī) It belongs to the Rajasthani language group and is commonly taken to be a dialect of Haryanvi. It is spoken in Ahirwal region the abode of Ahirs/Heers Behror, Mundawar, Tijara, Bansur (in the district of Alwar, Rajasthan), Kotputli in Jaipur district.

== Lexis ==
Modern Dhundhari [rwr], which is used in the present time, in Rajasthan shares a 75-80% lexical similarity with Hindi (this is based on a Swadesh 207 word list comparison). It has many cognate words with Hindi. It also shares many words with other Rajasthani dialects. In some parts, it is also spoken mixed with Hindi and other similar languages.

== Phonology ==
The phonemic inventory of Jaipuri consists of both segmental phonemes and suprasegmental phonemes. There are 6 vowel phonemes and 32 consonantal phonemes in Jaipuri language. Out of the 32 consonantal phonemes, there are 20 Stops, 2 fricatives, 4 nasals, 2 flaps and 2 lateral and 2 semivowels.

Vowels in Dhundhari
Vowels	Front	Central	Back
Close	i		u
Close-mid	e		o
Open-mid		ɐ	
Open		ä	

Consonants in Dhundhari Language
	Bilabial	Alveolar	Retroflex	Palatal	Velar	Glottal
Stops	p pʰ b bʱ	t tʰ d dʱ	ʈ ʈʰ ɖ ɖʱ	c cʰ ɟ ɟʱ	k kʰ g gʱ	
Fricatives		s				h
Nasals	m	n	ɳ		ŋ	
Laterals		l	ɭ			
Flaps		ɾ	ɽ			
Semi Vowels	w			j		

=== Suprasegmental Phonemes ===
Nasalization is a suprasegmental phoneme found in Jaipuri language which occurs with all vowels. Some of the occurrences of nasalized vowels are given below in contrast with non-nasalised vowels. Examples—'Ãguli' means finger where the first letter A(ɐ) is nasalized; 'bɐgicho' is garden in Dhundhari and ɐ is not nasalized. 'pũ:cʰŋo' is 'to wipe’ and again u is the suprasegmental phoneme.

== Morphology ==
Dhundhari have a structure that is quite similar to Hindustani (Hindi or Urdu). The primary word order is subject–object–verb. Most of the interrogatives used in Dhundhari are different from Hindi.

== Vocabulary ==
Dhundhari vocabulary is somewhat similar to other Western Indo-Aryan languages, especially Rajasthani. A little similarity can be traced between Dhundhari and Gujarati too. However, elements of grammar and fundamental terminology differ enough to significantly impede mutual intelligibility. Dhundhari also uses some words of Sanskrit which are not a part of Hindi now.

== Writing System ==
Dhundhari is generally written in Devanagari script. Though not very much use of written Dhundhari is seen nowadays.

== Usage ==
Though Jaipuri is used as a mother tongue in the home domains, the usage varies since the younger generation use Jaipuri mixed with Hindi. Jaipuri is used in the public places of the locality and the market among the Jaipuri speakers. Though Jaipuri is not taught as a separate subject or as a medium of instruction in the schools, oral communication and teaching is done mostly through Jaipuri language in the rural areas where Jaipuri speakers are in dominance. Many people in the last years have migrated to Hindi and stopped using Dhundhari altogether and this trend continues. It reduces the actual number of speakers in the census.
