= Tonk, India =

Tonk
- City
- Nickname: Nawabi Nagari
- Location within Rajasthan Location within India
- Coordinates: 26.17°N 75.78°E
- Country: India
- State: Rajasthan
- District: Tonk

Government
  - Body: Nagar Parishad
- Elevation: 289 m (948 ft)

Population (2011)
  - Total: 165,294

Languages
  - Official: Hindi
- Time zone: UTC+5:30 (IST)
- ISO 3166 code: RJ-IN
- Vehicle registration: RJ-26
- Website: www.tonk.rajasthan.gov.in

Tonk is a city in Tonk district of the Indian state of Rajasthan. The city of Tonk is situated 95 km (60 mi) by road south from Jaipur, near the right bank of the Banas River. It is the administrative headquarters of Tonk District. Tonk was also the capital of the eponymous princely state of British India from 1817 to 1947. Kamal Amrohi's movie Razia Sultan was shot in Tonk in 1981–82. Famous places in Tonk include: Shahi Jama Masjid, Bisalpur Dam, Arabic Persian Research Institute, Sunhari Kothi, Hathi Bhata, haadi rani ka kund, Annapurna Dungri Ganesh Temple, Rasiya Ki Tekri, Kidwai Park, Ghantaghar, Kamdhenu Circle, Nehru Garden, and Chaturbhuj Talab Lake.

== Demographics ==
Religion in Tonk (2011)
Religion	Percent
Hinduism	50.31%
Islam	47.18%
Jainism	2.34%
Other or not stated	0.17%
Distribution of religions

In the 2011 Indian census, Tonk had a population of 165,294, with 48% being female. 14% of the population is age six and under. Tonk has an average literacy rate of 68.62%: 77.68% in males, and 59.18% in females. In terms of religion, 48% were Muslim, 50% were Hindu, 1.8% were Jain and 0.2% others.

Languages of Tonk (2011)
1. Hindi (59.1%)
2. Urdu (23.6%)
3. Dhundari (8.74%)
4. Rajasthani (7.54%)
5. Others (1.08%)

At the time of the 2011 census, 59.06% of the population spoke Hindi, 23.58% Urdu, 8.74% Dhundari and 7.54% Rajasthani as their first language.

Amir Khan (1769–1834), a leader of Pashtun descent from Salarzai sub-clan of Yusufzai Tribe, Village Jawarai (Jowar) of District Buner, Khyber Pakhtunkhwa. In 1806, Khan conquered the area, taking it from a retreating regime Yashwant Rao Holkar. The British government captured it in turn. Khan then received the state of Tonk from the British Government who returned it. In 1817, after the Third Anglo-Maratha War, Amir Khan submitted to the British East India Company and kept his territory of Tonk while receiving the title of Nawab. Tonk was founded one year later after Khan was granted land by the ruler of Indore.

A municipality was established at Tonk in 1885.

Black deer (Krishna Mrug) are found in abundance in Rani Pura Gram Panchayat in Uniara subdivision of Tonk district. The state government has declared it a protected area for their conservation.

== See also ==
- Tonk State
- Wali Hasan Tonki
