= List of Mayoites =

Alumni of Mayo College and Mayo College Girls School are often referred to as Mayoites.

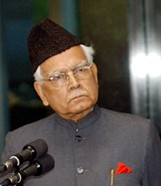
K. Natwar Singh (Diplomat)

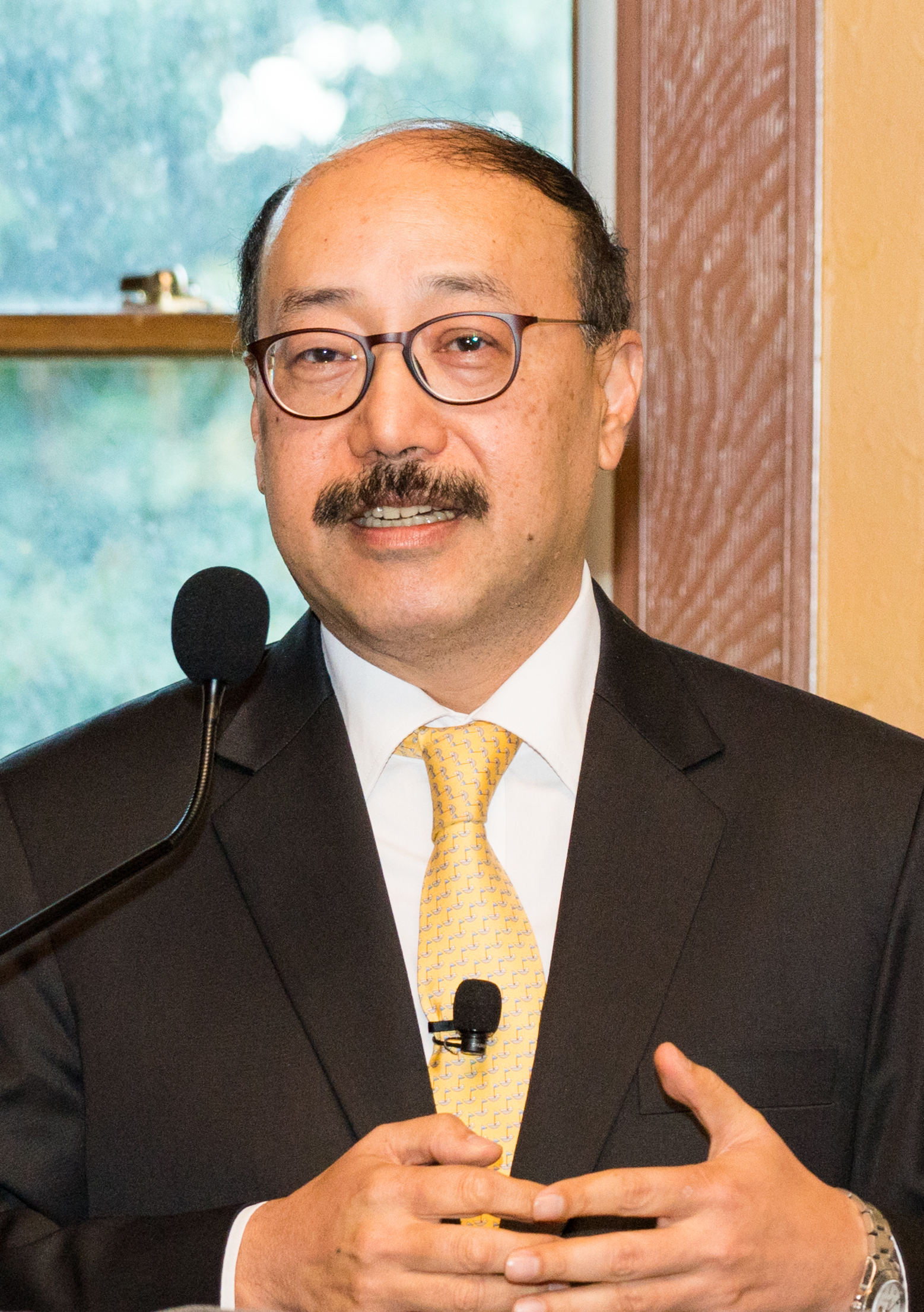
Harsh Vardhan Shringla (Diplomat)

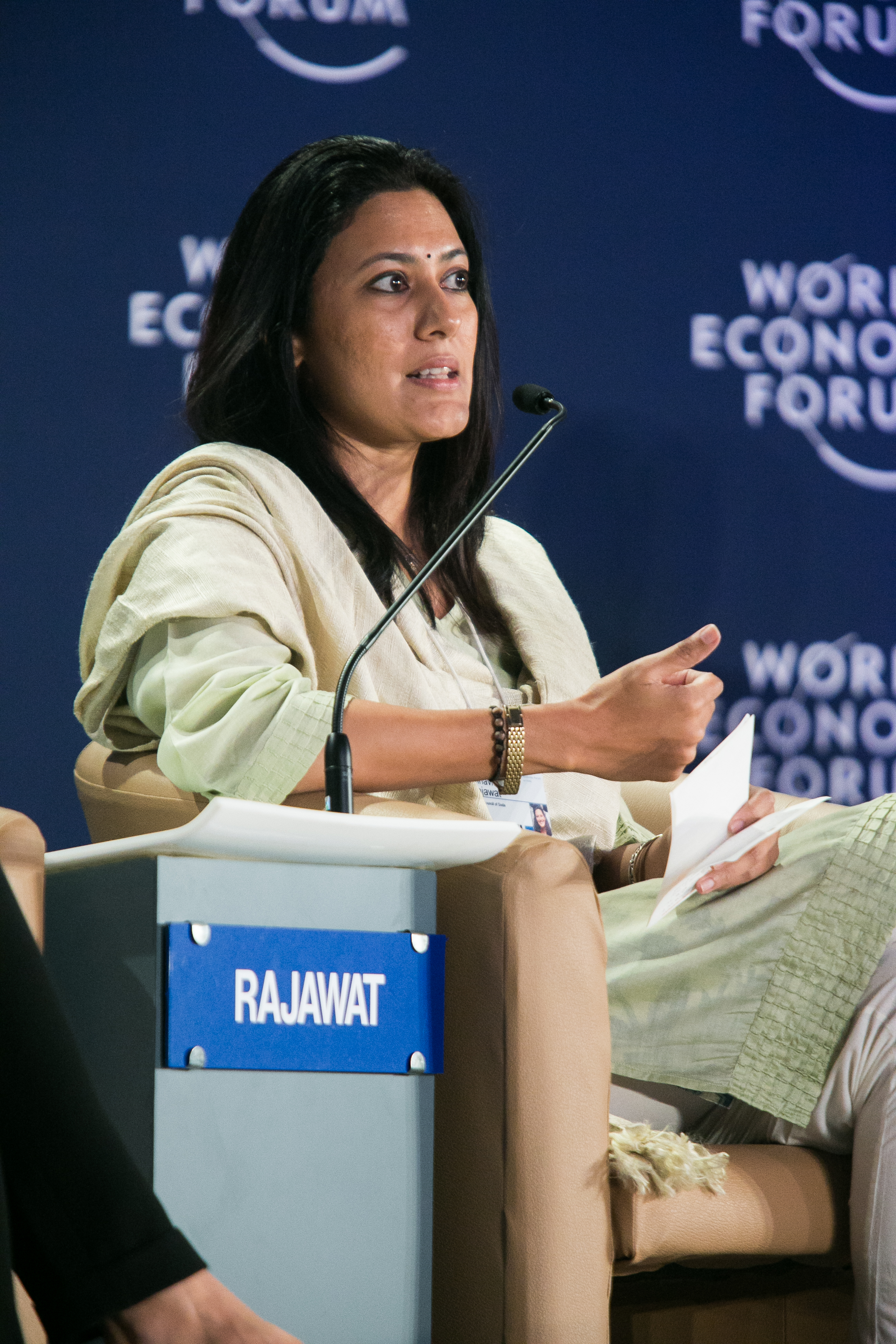
Chhavi Rajawat (Politician)

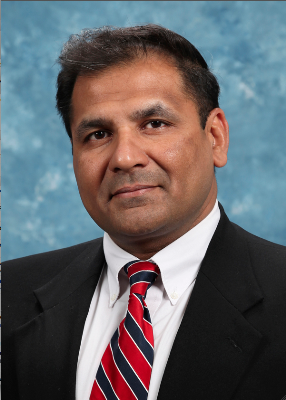
Amit Goyal
(Scientist, Inventor)

V. P. Singh Badnore (Governor of Punjab cum Administrator of Chandigarh)

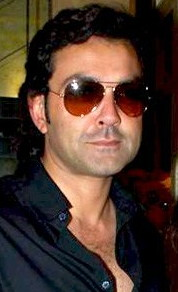
Bobby Deol (Actor)

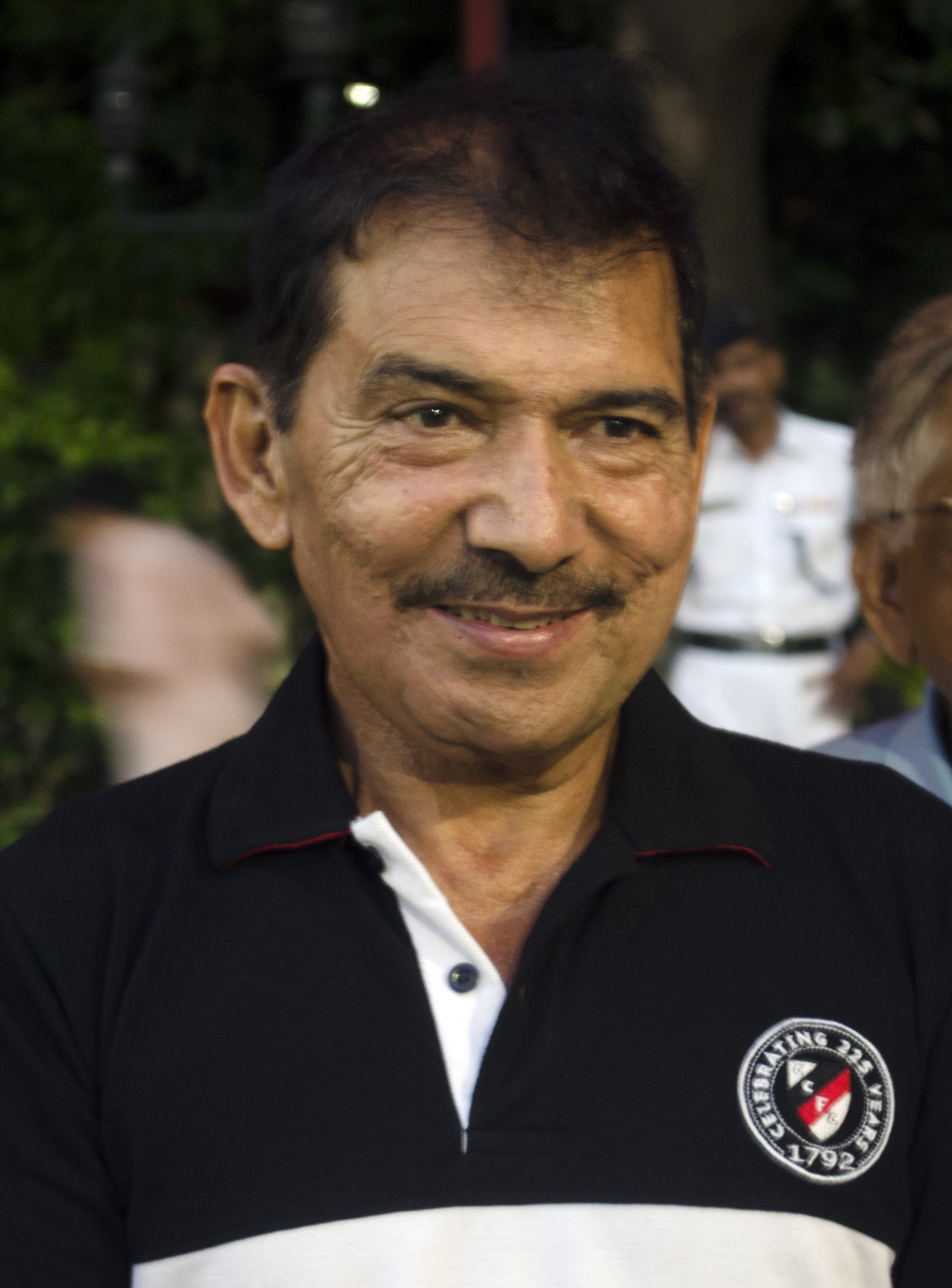
Arun Lal (Cricketer)

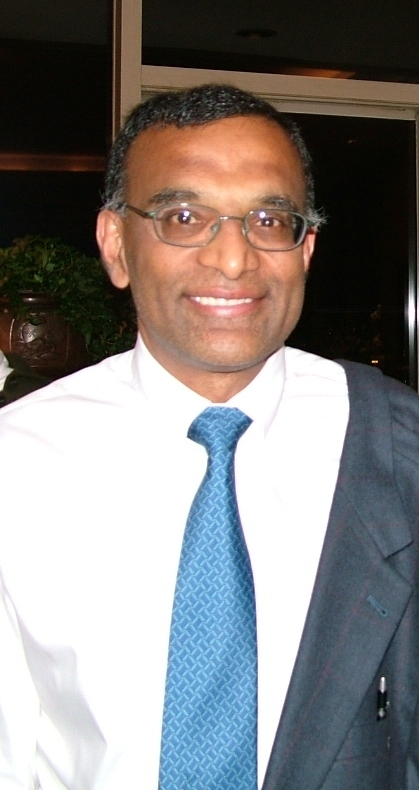
Alok Bhargava (Academician)

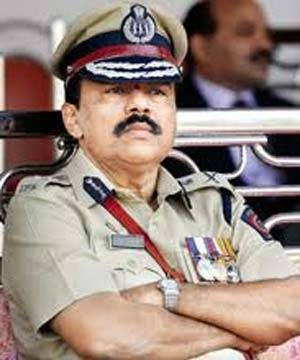
Arup Patnaik
(IPS officer)

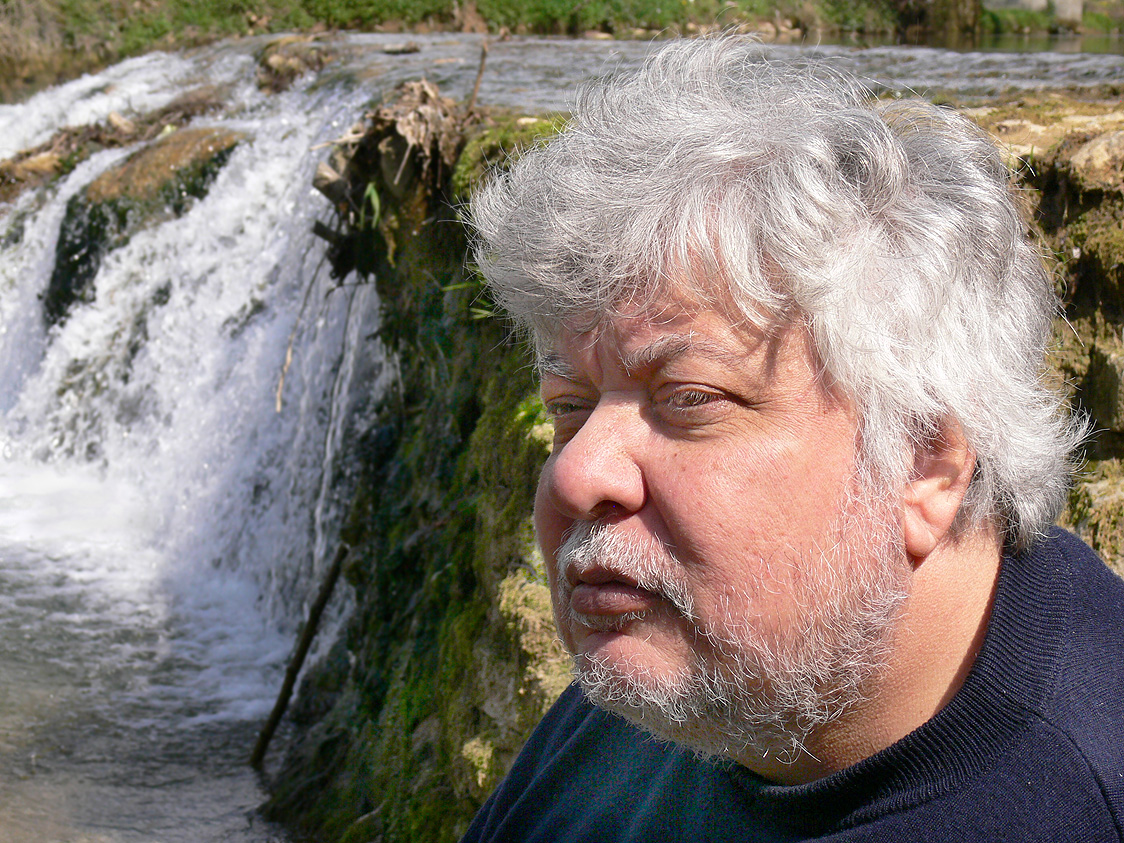
Indra Sinha
(Writer)

== Artists ==
Name	Profession	Notability
Jaideep Mehrotra	Painters and sculptor	Since 1967 he has had 18 solo shows and more than 30 Groups to his credit. A pioneer of digital media in Indian art
Shakti Maira	Sculptor and writer	His work is in the National Gallery of Modern Art and private collections around the world. Author of 'Towards Ananda: Rethinking Indian Art and Aesthetics.'

== Civil servants ==
Name	Profession	Notability
Arup Patnaik	IPS officer	Additional Director-General, Commissioner of Police, Mumbai. Police Medal for Meritorious Service and President's Police Medal for Distinguished Service
K. C. Verma	Secretary (Security)	Served as Director General, Narcotics Control Bureau and director Research and Analysis Wing, India
Probir Sen	Director, India International Centre	Member of the Indian Administrative Service. Served as Principal Secretary, Commerce and Industry in the Government of Madhya Pradesh, former chairman and managing director of Air India and Indian Airlines
Amitabh Kant	IAS officer	Member of Indian Administrative Service. CEO, Niti Aayog

== Conservationists ==
Name	Profession	Notability
HH Nawab Muhammad Mahabat Khan III GCIE, KCSI	Nawab of Junagadh	He is credited with a conservation effort that helped ensure the survival of the asiatic lion.
Priyamvada Singh	Princess of Meja, Rajasthan; and Yuvrani Saheb of Talcher, Odisha. Social Entrepreneur and Media Professional	She is a recipient of the Nari Shakti Puraskar, which is regarded as India's highest civilian honour for women. She is credited with heritage conservation efforts and women empowerment initiatives.

== Diplomats ==
Name	Profession	Notability
Gurjit Singh	IFS Officer	Indian ambassador to Germany and previously Indonesia and Ethiopia Representative of India to the African Union and the United Nations Economic Commission for Africa. Author of 'The Abalone Factor' and 'The Injera and the Paratha'.
Harsh Vardhan Shringla	IFS Officer	33rd Foreign Secretary of India, previously served as Indian Ambassador to the United States, High Commissioner to Bangladesh and Ambassador to Thailand.

== News workers ==
Name	Profession	Notability
Vir Sanghvi	Editor	Ex-Editor, Hindustan Times, Talk-Show Host
Charu Sharma	Anchor	Sports anchor on television
Tunku Varadarajan	Editor	Editor, Newsweek
Siddharth Varadarajan	Editor	Ex-Editor, The Hindu and Visiting Professor of Journalism at the Graduate School of Journalism at the University of California, Berkeley
Dhiren Bhagat (Oxon)	Journalist, Poet	Died at 31 in Delhi. Wrote for the Spectator (London), the Sunday Observer, the Indian Post, and the Illustrated Weekly of India, the Telegraph, the Hindustan Times, the Indian Express, India Today, Sunday, Harpers and Queen, and the London Magazine. Also wrote short stories and poetry.
Manvendra Singh	Member of Parliament, Editor	Ex Assistant Editor, Indian Express

== Royalty ==
Name	Notability
Maharaja Mangal Singh Naruka of Alwar	First student of Mayo College; Maharaja of Alwar State (1874-1892)
Maharaja Hari Singh of Jammu and Kashmir	The last ruler of the state,(father of Dr. Karan Singh)
Maharaja Sawai Man Singh II of Jaipur	Erstwhile Maharaja of Jaipur. Ace polo player, Indian Ambassador to Spain, (married Maharani Gayatri Devi)
Maharaja Vibhuti Narayan Singh of Banares	The last King of Banares (Varanasi in the Indian State of Uttar Pradesh. He was a scholar of Sanskrit, Veda and Purana. He served as Chancellor of Banaras Hindu University.
Maharaja Sawai Kumar Padmanabh Singh	Maharaja of Jaipur
Maharaja Ganga Singh GCSI, GCIE, GCVO, GBE, KCB, GCStJ	Erstwhile Maharaja of the princely state of Bikaner from 1888 to 1943. He is widely remembered as a modern reformist visionary, and he was also the only "non-White" member of the British Imperial War Cabinet during World War I.
Maharajkumar of Vizianagram	Cricketer and politician. Educated at Mayo College and at Haileybury and Imperial Service College. Was knighted although he renounced his knighthood after India gained her independence.
Yuvaraja Sri Sir Kanteerava Narasimharaja Wadiyar, GCIE	Heir Apparent of the princely state of Mysore.
HH Maharaja Rajendra Singh of Rajpipla	Polo player, son of HH Maharaja Sir Vijaysinhji of Rajpipla, Gohil dynasty which traces its lineage to the 6th century A.D.
Maharaj Nagendra Singh of the State of Dungarpur	Born 18 March 1914, was educated at Mayo College, Ajmer, and Cambridge, England. He obtained his Doctorate in Law from the same university and joined the Indian Civil Service. Appointed a Judge, he later became the Chief Justice of the International Court of Justice at The Hague.
HH Maharana Mahendra Singh Mewar	Erstwhile ruler of Udaipur (Mewar Dynasty)
HH Arvind Singh Mewar	From Royal family of Udaipur (Mewar Dynasty)
HH Maharao Brijraj Singh of Kotah	From the erstwhile royal family of Kotah
Prince Shivraj Singh of Marwar-Jodhpur	Prince of the erstwhile Royal Family of Jodhpur, which can trace its lineage back to 1226 A.D.
HH Maharaja Jitendra Singh	From the erstwhile royal family of Alwar
HH Maharaja Martand Singh Ju Deo Bahadur of Rewa	Erstwhile Maharaja of the princely state of Rewa from 1946 to 1995. Indian wildlife conservationist, former member of parliament from Rewa, and former Rajpramukh of Vindhya Pradesh
HRH Princess Shruti	Princess of Nepal. A member of the Shah Dynasty.
Sultan Said bin Taimur	The twelfth Sultan of Oman
Pragmulji III of Cutch	Present titular head of Cutch in Gujarat, India
HH Nawab Muhammad Mahabat Khan III GCIE, KCSI	Babi Bahadur of Junagadh. He is credited with a conservation effort that helped ensure the survival of the asiatic lion.

== Politicians ==
Name	Profession	Notability
Jaswant Singh	Politician	Finance Minister of India (1996 and 2004), External Affairs Minister of India (1998) and Minister of Defence for India
Natwar Singh (Cantab.)	Indian Foreign Service and politician	He was Member of Parliament, has received Padma Bhushan. Served as Ambassador to Pakistan and as Minister of External Affairs, Government of India
Rajendra Narayan Singh Deo	Politician	Former Chief Minister of Orissa
Dinesh Dhamija	Politician	British Indian entrepreneur, Liberal Democrat, and Member of the European Parliament
Manvendra Singh	Politician	Member of Parliament
Jitendra Singh	Politician	AICC Secretary and Maharaja of Alwar
V.P. Singh Badnore	Politician	Honorable Governor of Punjab and Administrator for Chandigarh UT, Former Member of Parliament -13th and 14th Lok Sabha and Rajya Sabha, Four time MLA.
Thakur Ganpat Singh	Politician	Member of Legislative Assembly, Ajmer, 1951.
Bhawani Singh of Pokhran	Politician	Member 1st Lok Sabha (1952)
Deepender Singh Hooda	Politician	Member of Parliament from the Indian National Congress from the Rohtak constituency in Haryana. He is the son of Bhupinder Singh Hooda who served as Chief Minister of Haryana, while his grandfather, Ranbir Singh Hooda, was a freedom fighter, a member of the Constituent Assembly and Minister in Punjab.
Raj Raj Singh Deo	Politician	Former Member of Parliament, 4th and 5th Lok Sabha

== Writers ==
Name	Profession	Notability
Vikram Chandra	Writer	Wrote Red Earth & Pouring Rain (winner of the Commonwealth Writers Prize for Best First Book, and the David Higham Prize for Fiction), Sacred Games, etc. (Senior Lecturer in English at the University of California Berkeley (UCB).
Indra Sinha, Cantab.	Writer	Author, Animal's People, short-listed for the 2007 Man Booker Prize for Fiction, and Winner of 2008 Commonwealth Writers Prize for Europe and South Asia; The Death of Mr Love; The Cybergypsies (non-fiction); Tantra (non-fiction); Kama Sutra (Translation)
Ruchir Joshi	Writer	Author of The Last Jet-Engine Laugh and editor of Electric Feather, India's first anthology of erotica.
Maroof Raza	Defence analyst, writer, educationalist	Defence correspondent at NDTV and associate editor of the Indian Defence Review. Visiting research fellow at the War Studies Department of King's College, London. He graduated from St. Stephen's College, Delhi, King's College London and Cambridge University

== Performing arts and media ==
Name	Profession	Notability
Bobby Deol	Actor	Famous actor
Ajay Mehta	Actor	TV shows, include Eli Stone, Sex and the City, Numb3rs, CSI: NY, Modern Family and Outsourced. Played Citigroup CEO, Vikram Pandit, in the TV movie Too Big to Fail, and the leader of India in G.I. Joe: Retaliation.
Tinnu Anand	Actor, Film Director	He has worked in more than 100 Bollywood movies.
Gauravv K Chawla	Film Director, Screenwriter	Directed Hindi Feature Film Baazaar starring Saif Ali Khan.
Vivek Oberoi	Actor	Known for Shootout at Lokhandwala, Omkara (2006 film), Yuva, etc.
Rishi Kapoor	Actor	Did not graduate. Attended Mayo for less than one year before being transferred to the Campion School in Mumbai due to an illness.
Sagarika Ghatge	Actress	Known for her role in Chak De India
Deeksha Seth	Actress	Active performer in Hindi and regional cinema of India
Aamir Raza Hussain	Director, actor	Well known Theatre Personality, Recipient of the Padma Shree Award
Goldie Behl	Director, producer	He has Directed and written Bas Itna Sa Khwaab Hai and Drona (2008 film). He has also Produced London, Paris, New York.
Aditya Lakhia	Actor and director	Has appeared in Lagaan, Shootout at Lokhandwala, Jo Jeeta Wohi Sikandar, etc.
Samir Karnik	Director, producer	Has Directed Heroes (2008 film), Yamla Pagla Deewana, Kyun! Ho Gaya Na..., etc.
Karan Kundra	TV Actor	Lead role in Kitni Mohabbat Hai
Pradip Krishen	Filmmaker	Married to Booker Prize–winning author Arundhati Roy, Krishen read at St. Stephens College, New Delhi and at Oxford before teaching History at Delhi University
Rahul Singh	Actor	Mayo College Batch of 1990. Has acted in Zubeidaa, 24 (Indian TV series) and various other plays and films.
Priya Wal	TV Actress	Known for her role in Remix, CID, Pyar Kii Ye Ek Kahaani.
Vedita Pratap Singh	Actress	Bhindi Baazaar Inc. and Mumbai 125 KM

== Armed forces ==
Name	Profession	Notability
Admiral Sunil Lanba, PVSM, AVSM	Indian Navy	Chief of Naval Staff of the Indian Navy and the erstwhile Commandant of National Defence College.
Lt. Gen. Nathu Singh Rathore	Indian Army	The first Lt. General of the Indian Army. He was favoured by Field Marshal Claude Auchinleck to be the first Indian Army Chief, but declined the position to Jawaharlal Nehru because he felt it would not be fair to supersede his senior General Cariappa.
Lt Gen (Retd) Ajai Singh, PVSM, AVSM	Indian Army	Governor of Assam
Lt Gen Aditya Singh	Indian Army	C-in-C, Andamans, C-in-C Southern Command
HH Maharao Shri Bhim Singh II	Indian Army	Honorary Brigadier in the Indian Army and also Honorary Colonel of the 17 Poona Horse. During the Second World War, he was a member of the Viceroy's War Council. Up-Rajpramukh of Rajasthan State in 1948/1956. He has also served as India's alternate delegate to the United Nations General Assembly in 1956

== Commerce and industry ==
Manufacturing

Name	Profession	Notability
Ravi Kant	Administration	Vice Chairman and M.D. Tata Motors
Vikram Mehta	Administration	Served as Chairman Shell India
Probir Sen	Board Member	Bharat Petroleum

Hospitality and drinks

Name	Profession	Notability
Karan Grover	Administration	Director, Grover Vineyards Ltd.

Information technology

Name	Profession	Notability
Ashwin Ram	Research	Chief Innovation Officer, Palo Alto Research Center Incorporated.
Probir Sen	Board Member	HCL Technologies Ltd.

Finance and banking

Name	Profession	Notability
Sushil Wadhwani, CBE	Central Banker	Bank of England. Was appointed full-time independent member of the Monetary Policy Committee.
Rakesh Mohan	Central Banker	Deputy Governor, Reserve Bank of India
Brij Singh	Founder and CEO	Baer Capital Partners, UAE

== Law ==
Name	Profession	Notability
Maharaj Nagendra Singh of Dungarpur	Judge	Was Chief Justice of the International Court of Justice at The Hague.
Raghuvendra Singh Rathore	Judge	Rajasthan High Court

== Sportspeople ==
Name	Profession	Notability
Divyakriti Singh	Equestrian	Asian Games Gold medalist' 2022, Arjuna Awardee' 2023
Maharajkumar of Vizianagram	Cricketer	Indian Test captain, cricket administrator and legendary cricket commentator
Apurvi Chandela	Shooter	Won Gold Medal in 2014 Commonwealth Games, Glasgow
HH Maharaja Sawai Padmanabh Singh of Jaipur	Polo Player	Youngest captain of an Indian World Cup team.
Col. Bhawani Singh (Retd.)	Polo Player	Represented India at multiple World Cups, as player, coach and administrator
Lokendra Singh Ghanerao	Polo Player	Indian Polo Team Captain at the World Cup
Arun Lal	Cricketer	Test Cricketer and Sports Broadcaster

== Academics ==
Name	Profession	Notability
Amit Goyal	Scientist, Inventor and Academic Scholar	Scientist and inventor. Awarded the E. O. Lawrence Award for Energy Science and Innovation in the United States.
Alok Bhargava	Academic	Has contributed to research in econometric methodology and food policy issues in developing and developed countries.
Eknath Ghate	Mathematician	Mathematician and winner of the Shanti Swarup Bhatnagar Prize for Science and Technology.
