= Lokendra Singh =

Lokendra Singh may refer to:

- Lokendra Singh (polo player), Indian polo player
- Lokendra Singh (politician) (1976-2018), Indian politician, member of the 16th Legislative Assembly of Uttar Pradesh
- Lokendra Singh Ju Deo (1946-2021), Indian politician from Madhya Pradesh.
