= Vikram Mehta =

Vikram Mehta may refer to:

- Vikram Bhagvandas Mehta (1946–2014), Indian mathematician
- Vikram Singh Mehta, Indian business executive
