= Priyamvada Singh =

Media professional and heritage restorer (born c.1983)

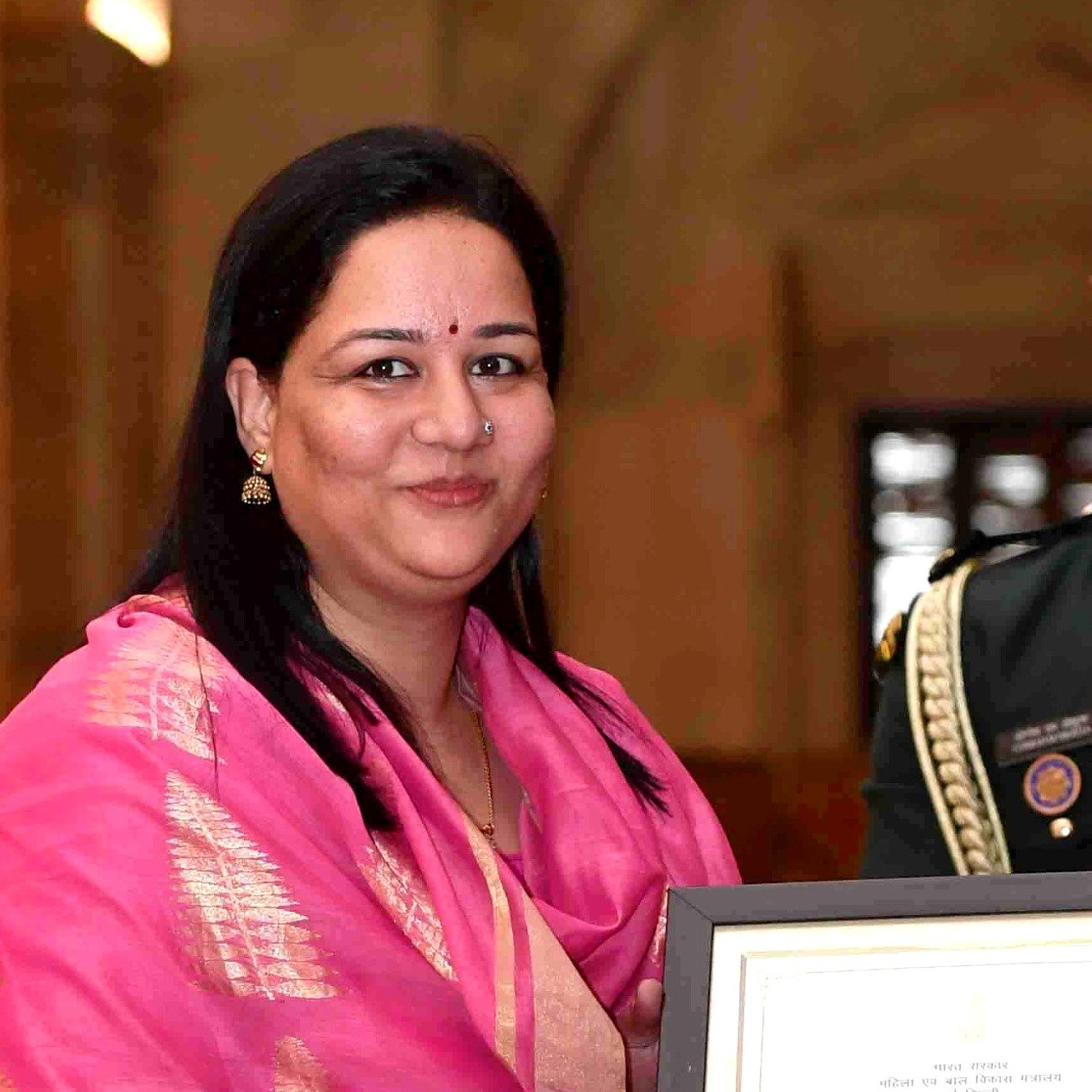
- in 2019
- Born: c. 1983; Ajmer
- Education: Mayo College Girls School
- Occupations: TV Industry and Heritage Restoration
- Known for: Heritage Restoration in Rajasthan
- Spouse: Vijayendra Chandra Deb

Priyamvada Singh (born c. 1983) is a media professional and a heritage restorer based in India. After working in the television industry in Mumbai for a decade, she returned to her ancestral home in Rajasthan, and used the skills of the local community to restore an ancestral fort in her village Meja near Bhilwara. Her use of local skills for the restoration and social upliftment efforts towards the local community won her the Nari Shakti Puraskar from the Indian Government.

== Early years ==
She was born about 1983, and educated at Mayo College Girls School and Sophia College in Ajmer.

Her father Jitendra Singh is a retired bureaucrat and mother Ramma Kumari is a housewife.

== Early career ==
She began her career in the media as an Assistant Director with filmmaker Muzaffar Ali in New Delhi and worked on several projects like an Indo-French Opera, an international music festival series Jahan-e-Khusrau, and a Cultural Festival at the Southbank Centre London. These were followed by some freelance creative projects with DDNE, DD Kashir, ICCR, UNODC, etc. Later she worked in the television industry in Mumbai as a Content Developer for shows such as Kaun Banega Crorepati, Dus Ka Dum and India's Got Talent.

== Restoration ==
However, she decided to give it up on a visit home when she decided to restore the family's ancestral home, a 60 room fort which had not been repaired ever since it was built over 146 years ago. Meja Fort was built by her ancestor, Rawat Amar Singh Ji around 1875 after being granted this Jagir in 1871 by the Maharana of Mewar.

She moved into the fort, and ensured that the restoration process employed local people, and the women in particular benefitted by earning their own income. She used traditional building techniques like dry stone masonry, lime plaster, etc to restore this structure spread across an area of about 50,000 square feet. The Meja Dam is nearby.

The restored fort was used as a location for a short film titled "Blouse". The film put the restored work on show and the local people earned employment and fame by assisting the filmmaker Vijayeta Kumar and appearing as extras in the film. The film got a theatrical release by PVR Cinemas and received the Best Short Film award at the New York Indian Film Festival in 2014-15. One local boy's singing talent spotted by Singh has seen him establish a move to Mumbai.The fort is used as a base for local celebrations like Gangaur, Jal Jhoolni Ekadashi, etc. and it is also being used for community welfare activities like Blood Donation and Yoga Camps. The fort also houses a Community Library for the locals. Eventually the fort may be used as a residence for visiting tourists.

== Recognition ==
In February 2018, Singh was chosen as one of the 25 inspiring women from across India to receive the Advantage Woman Award given by the ICICI Bank. The award was presented to her in Mumbai by actor Vidya Balan for her restoration work and the project's social impact.

In August 2018, the Mehrangarh Museum Trust and Veer Durga Das Smruti Samiti Jodhpur, spearheaded by H.H Gaj Singh Ji of Jodhpur also awarded her efforts towards heritage restoration and its social impact.

On 8 March 2019, she was awarded the Nari Shakti Puraskar for her leadership and example. This award was presented by the Honorable President of India Shri Ram Nath Kovind on the recommendation of the Ministry of Women and Child Development. The Prime Minister Shri Narendra Modi also interacted with her and all the other awardees during this occasion.

== Private life ==
She married Vijayendra Chandra Deb in 2014.
