= Brij Singh =

Indian banker and businessman (born 1963)

Brij Raj Singh
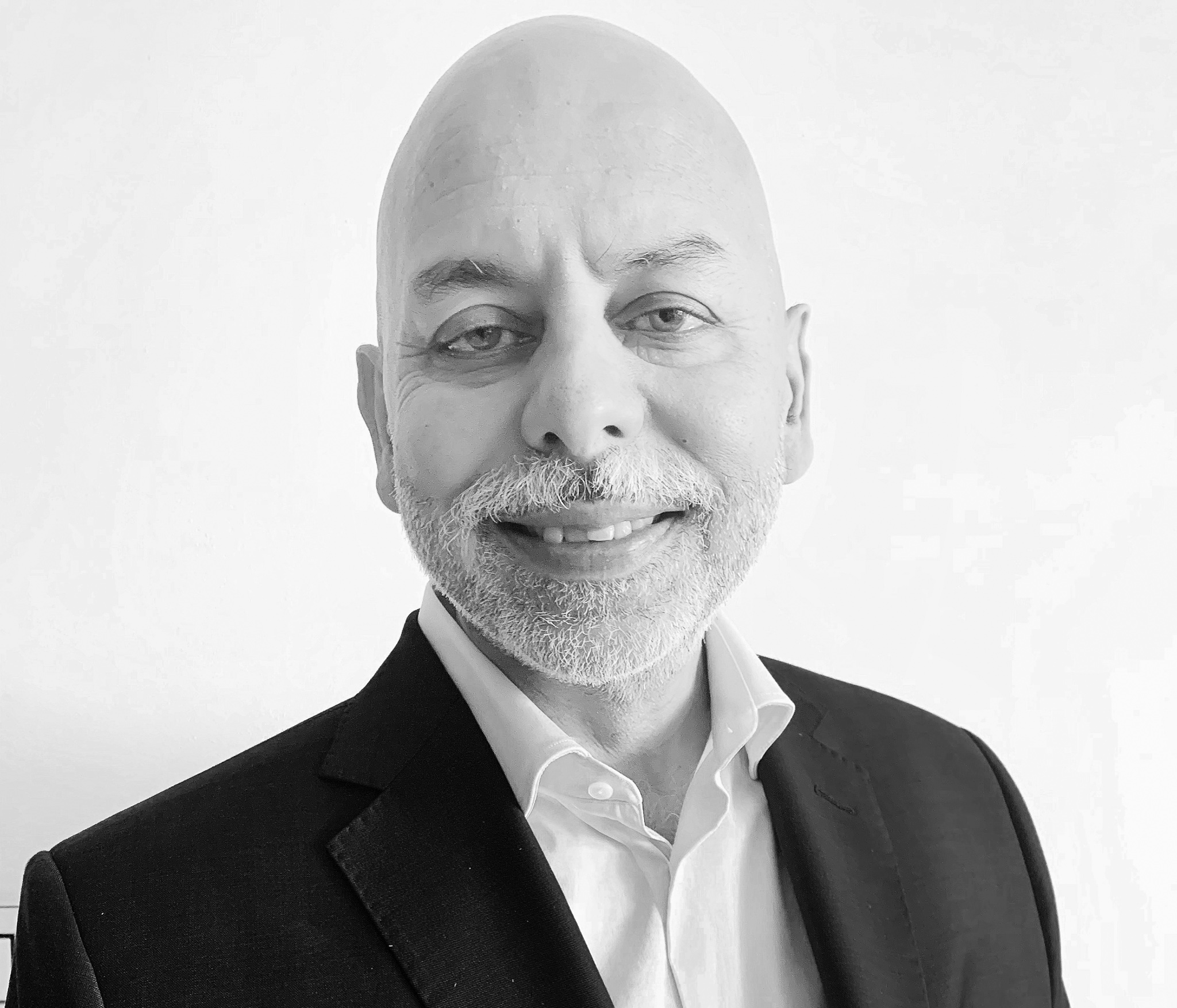
- Founder and CEO of Baer Capital Partners
- Born: 17 November 1963 (age 62); India
- Occupations: CEO and Founder, Baer Capital Partners
- Spouse: Piyali
- Children: 2

Brij Raj Singh is an Indian banker and businessman.

== Personal life and education ==
Brij Raj Singh was born and raised in India. He attended Mayo College in Ajmer, and later was educated at St. Stephen's College, Delhi University and the Amos Tuck School of Business at Dartmouth College. He attended the six-week Advanced Management Program at Harvard Business School.

== Business career ==
Brij Raj Singh has over 20 years of experience working in the financial services industry. He is currently the founding chief executive officer at Baer Capital Partners Ltd. He was the chief executive officer and managing director of Julius Baer Middle East. Julius Baer was granted the first bank license at the Dubai International Financial Centre (DIFC) by Mohammed bin Rashid Al Maktoum. Brij also led Julius Baer to being recognized as the "Best Private Bank" in the region by Banker Middle East.

He was previously a managing director at Merrill Lynch.

Brij had also been the Chairman of the Young Presidents’ Organization (YPO) in the Emirates besides being actively involved with numerous other organizations.

== Author ==
Brij Singh regularly writes articles on strategy and leadership development and is the author of "India Chalo" (2008), "Wisdom Beyond Borders" (2006), both published by HarperCollins, and "Building Successful Organizations – A Directional Approach" (1996).
