= Chhavi Rajawat =

Elected Head of Village Council

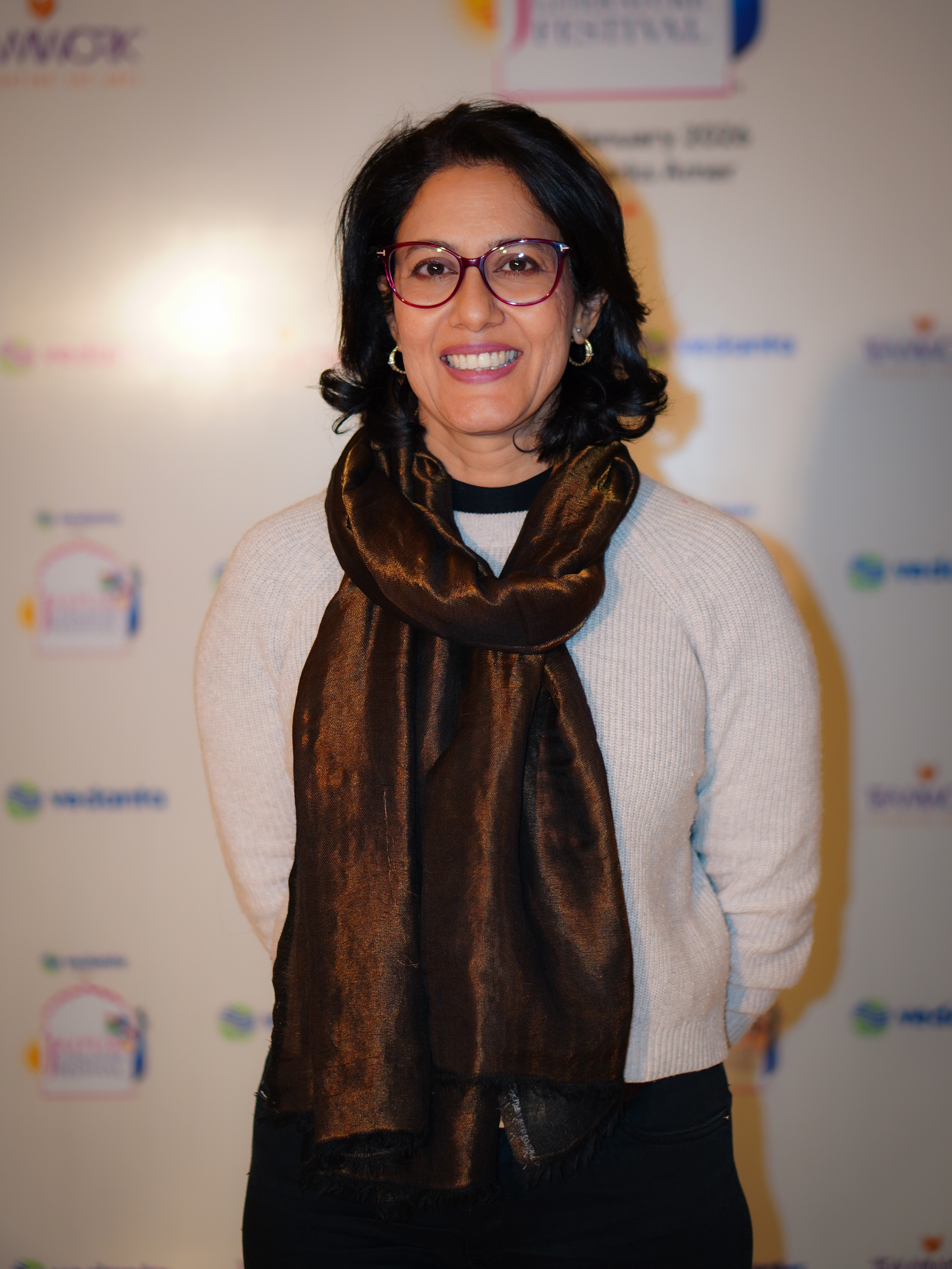
- Chhavi Rajawat at Jaipur Literature Festival 2026

Sarpanch of Soda
- Preceded by: Narendra Singh Rajawat, Harsh Chauhan

Personal details
- Born: Rajasthan, India

Chhavi Rajawat is an Indian politician. She was the former sarpanch of Soda, in Rajasthan, India.

== Early life ==
Rajawat was born in Jaipur, Rajasthan. She is from a small village called Soda in Malpura tehsil, but belongs to a wealthy and nobility linked family.Tonk district. She is an alumna of Rishi Valley School, Mayo College Girls School and Lady Shri Ram College and holds an MBA from Balaji Institute of Modern Management Pune.

== Personal life ==
Rajawat divides her time between her village, Soda, and Jaipur where she lives with her parents. She also tends to a hotel owned by the family and the numerous horses that are part of her riding school.

She studied at Rishi Valley School in Andhra Pradesh; Mayo College Girls’ School in Rajasthan and Lady Shri Ram College for Women in Delhi. After her MBA from Sri Balaji Society Pune, she worked for companies such as the Times of India, Carlson Group of Hotels, and Airtel.

== Career ==
Rajawat left her corporate job and city life to help develop rural India. She became the sarpanch (head of a village) of Soda, a village sixty kilometers from Jaipur, Rajasthan. Her grandfather, Brigadier Raghubir Singh, had been sarpanch of the same village twenty years prior to Rajawat's elections. After becoming sarpanch, she has implemented many projects for the village successfully such as rainwater harvesting and installing toilet facilities in most homes.

Her leadership has extended beyond infrastructure. Recognizing the pivotal role of women and youth in rural development, she launched several initiatives aimed at empowering these groups. She organized skill development workshops for women, providing them with opportunities to learn new trades and become financially independent. These workshops ranged from tailoring and handicrafts to digital literacy, equipping women with skills that could enhance their livelihood. The Times of India, a leading English newspaper in India, credits her as the changing face of rural Rajasthan.

On 25 March 2011, Rajawat made a well-received address to delegates at the 11th Infopoverty World Conference held at the United Nations.

The former and late president of India APJ Abdul Kalam honoured her with an award at the Technology Day function at New Delhi. She was also honoured as a "Young Indian Leader" by IBNLive.
