= Meja Dam (Bhilwara) =

Dam in Rajasthan, India

- Location within Rajasthan
- Location: Bhilwara, Rajasthan, India
- Coordinates: 25.3934°N 74.5405°E
- Type: Dam
- Primary inflows: Kothari River
- Basin countries: India
- Max. length: 30.00 feet (9.14 m)
- Settlements: Bhilwara

The Meja Dam is one of the biggest dams in Bhilwara and is famous for its Green Mount Park. It is located 20 km away from Bhilwara, in the state of Rajasthan, India.

Here Purawat Rajputs rule (before Independence) who belong to Sisodia clan. The present Thakur here is Bhim Singh Purawat.

The Meja Dam was the primary source of drinking water for Bhilwara city and its surrounding areas. For Bhilwara city, 62 tube wells were installed in the submergence area of the dam, but currently, except for 10 tube wells, all are almost dry. According to records from the PHED, sufficient water was available until 1996. However, after 1996, the water receipt in the dam abruptly decreased. The design capacity of the dam is 2930 mcft but water received in 2007, 2008, 2009 was 140 mcft, 21 mcft, 31.67 mcft, respectively.

The main reason for this decline could be the construction of a large number of small ponds in the catchment area of the dam without proper planning, catchment area management or monitoring. The Principal Secretary of PHED informed that more than 27,000 anicuts have been constructed, and 64 major and minor dams have been built over eight streams in the district. The main river flowing through the district is the Banas river, which is dry due to low rainfall in the catchment area. As a result, numerous tube wells sunk in Kankroliya Ghati area could not be recharged sufficiently.

The dam has reportedly filled with 28.9 feet of water level in August 2016.

== Salient features ==
Attribute	Value
Name	Meja Dam
River	Kothari
City	Bhilwara
District	Bhilwara
State	Rajasthan
Basin Name	Ganga
Seismic Zone	Seismic Zone-II
Dam Type	Earthen / Gravity / Masonry
Length of Dam	1270
Spillway Capacity (cumec)	3625
Design Flood (cumec)	3622
Dam Status	Completed
Purpose	Irrigation
Completion Year	1958
Operating and Maintenance Agency	WRD, Govt. of Rajasthan
Max Height above Foundation(m)	19.2
