= Mayo College =

- Coat of arms of Mayo College

Location
- Srinagar Road; Ajmer – 305001; India
- 26°26′42″N 74°39′24″E

Information
- Type: Private boarding school
- Motto: Let there be Light
- Founded: 1875; 151 years ago
- Founder: The 6th Earl of Mayo
- Authority: Board of Governors; Mayo College General Council
- President of General Council: HH Maharaja Gajsingh of Jodhpur
- Principal: Saurav Sinha
- Founder Headmaster: Col. Sir Oliver St. John
- Gender: Boys
- Enrollment: 750
- Language: English
- Campus: 74 hectares (180 acres)
- Houses: 12
- Colour
- Mascot: Peacock
- Nickname: Mayo
- Publication: Mayoor, Cyber Quest
- Annual tuition: ₹15,00,000 (residential); ₹20,00,000 (international)
- Affiliation: Central Board of Secondary Education
- Former pupils: Mayoites
- Website: www.mayocollege.com

Mayo College (informally Mayo) is a boys-only private boarding school in Ajmer, Rajasthan, India. It was founded in 1875 and named after the 6th Earl of Mayo, who was the Viceroy of India from 1869 to 1872, making it one of the oldest public boarding schools in India.

The idea for the college was proposed in 1869 by Colonel Walter. It was founded in 1875 and Colonel Sir Oliver St John became its first principal. The founder intended to create an "Eton of India". The 2nd Baron Lytton, Viceroy of India, said in a speech on campus in 1879:

"The idea was well expressed long ago by Colonel Walter in an excellent and most suggestive report which may have influenced Lord Mayo when he founded the present college. In that very sensible report, Colonel Walter pointed out that what was then most needed for the education of India's young rulers and nobles was an Indian Eton. Mayo is India's Eton and you are India's Eton boys".

It aimed to provide the leaders of the princely states with an education similar to that given by Eton College. The British built Mayo for the sons of the Indian upper classes, particularly the princes and nobles of India. Mayo College holds the privilege of educating many members of the Indian Royal Families and also the Royal family of Oman, Said bin Taimur (the 13th Sultan of Muscat and Oman) attended Mayo College from 1922 to 1927 where he mastered English and Urdu.

== Coat of arms ==
The coat of arms was composed from the design furnished by Lockwood Kipling, a former principal of the School of Arts, Lahore, and father of Rudyard Kipling.

In the upper centre of the shield are Mayo Arms and Quarterings, a Lion Rampant and an open hand. On the right and left are the sun and the moon, typical of Suryavanshi and Chandravanshi, the two great families of Rajputs. Below are the Panch Rang, the five sacred colours of the Rajputs, Red, Gold, Blue, White and Green. In the centre is a Rajput fort – two towers connected by a curtain. The supports are on the right: a Bhil warrior with string bow and full quiver of arrows. On the left a Rajput, armed at all points, wearing a steel helmet with three plumes, a shield on his back, a dagger and katar in his belt, and a suit of chain covered with embroidered cloth and gauntlet on his hand.

The motto "Let there be Light" is derived from the Bible. The badge is a peacock, the sacred bird of Rajputana, standing on a double-edged, two-handed Rajput sword called Khanda.

== History and traditions ==
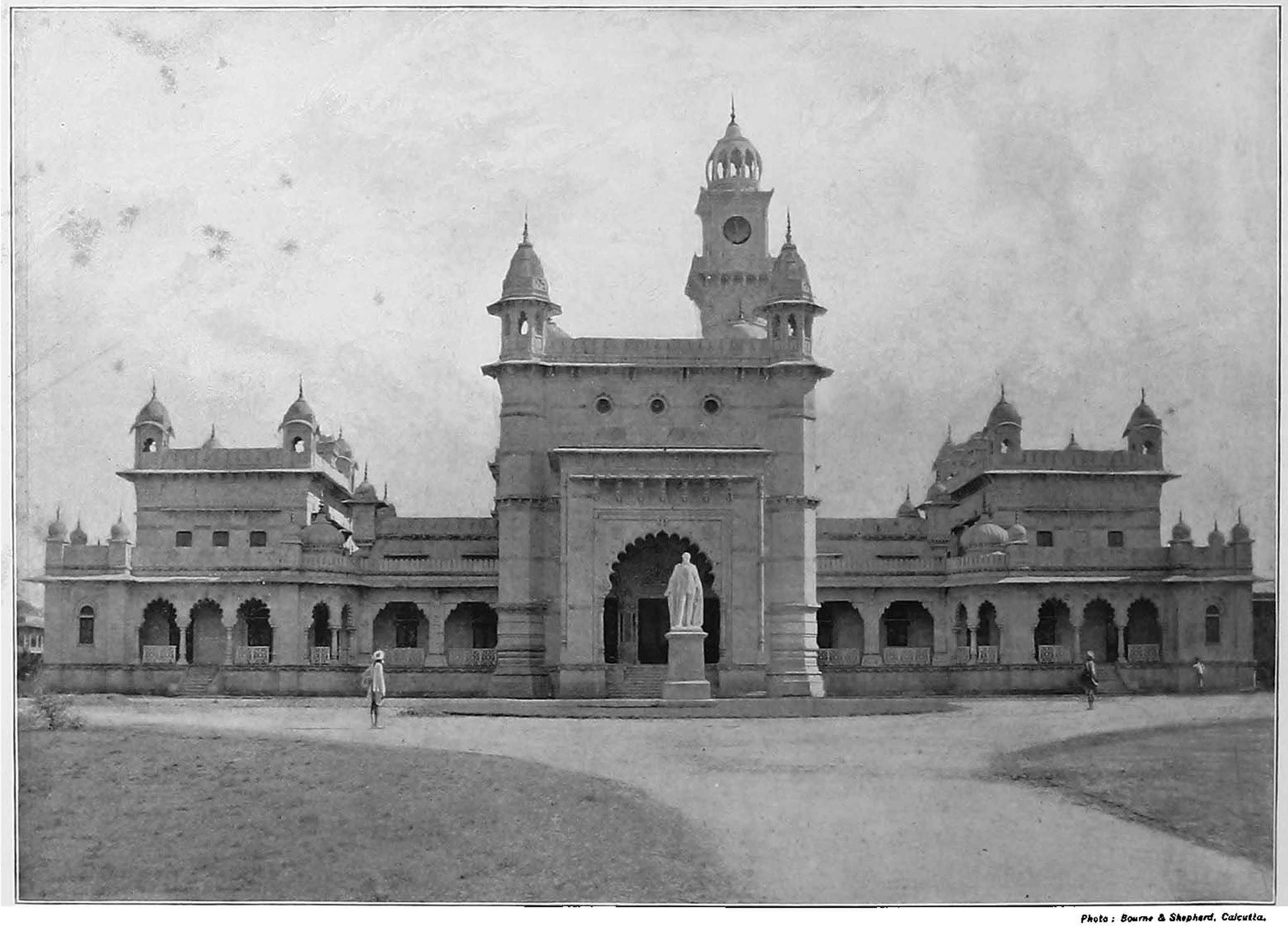
College building c. 1895

- Mayo's first student, H.H. Maharaja Mangal Singh of Alwar, arrived at the school gates in October 1875 on the back of an elephant accompanied by 300 retainers and a menagerie of tigers, camels and horses.
- One of the school's traditions is meeting for tea on the lawns known as Mughal Gardens immediately after the Annual Prizegiving ceremony. It is believed that M.N. Kapur (who went on to become one of Modern School New Delhi's most respected principals) did away with using a rope to divide English and Indian guests at this ceremony.
- The Annual Prizegiving, one of the oldest ceremonies at Mayo, has seen chief guests including Lord Irwin, Viceroy of India, Lord Chelmsford, governor general of India, Maharaja Hari Singh, last ruler of Kashmir, Dr. Rajendra Prasad, ex-president of India, Sawai Man Singh II of Jaipur, Gayatri Devi of Jaipur, Vijayalakshmi Pandit, Zakir Hussain, ex-president of India, Karan Singh, Indira Gandhi, ex-prime minister of India, field marshal Sam Manekshaw, Sayyid Faher Bin Taimur of Oman, Birendra Shah, King of Nepal, Khushwant Singh, Madhavrao Scindia, Peter Ustinov, Jaswant Singh and LK Advani.
- Other traditions at Mayo include an annual horseback parade by the students and sporting fixtures between Old Boys and current students, including a polo match.

== Mayo College General Council ==
There are more than 40 members of the Mayo College General Council including patron, life members, old boys' association representatives and MCGS old girls' representatives.

=== Council of monitors and sports captains ===
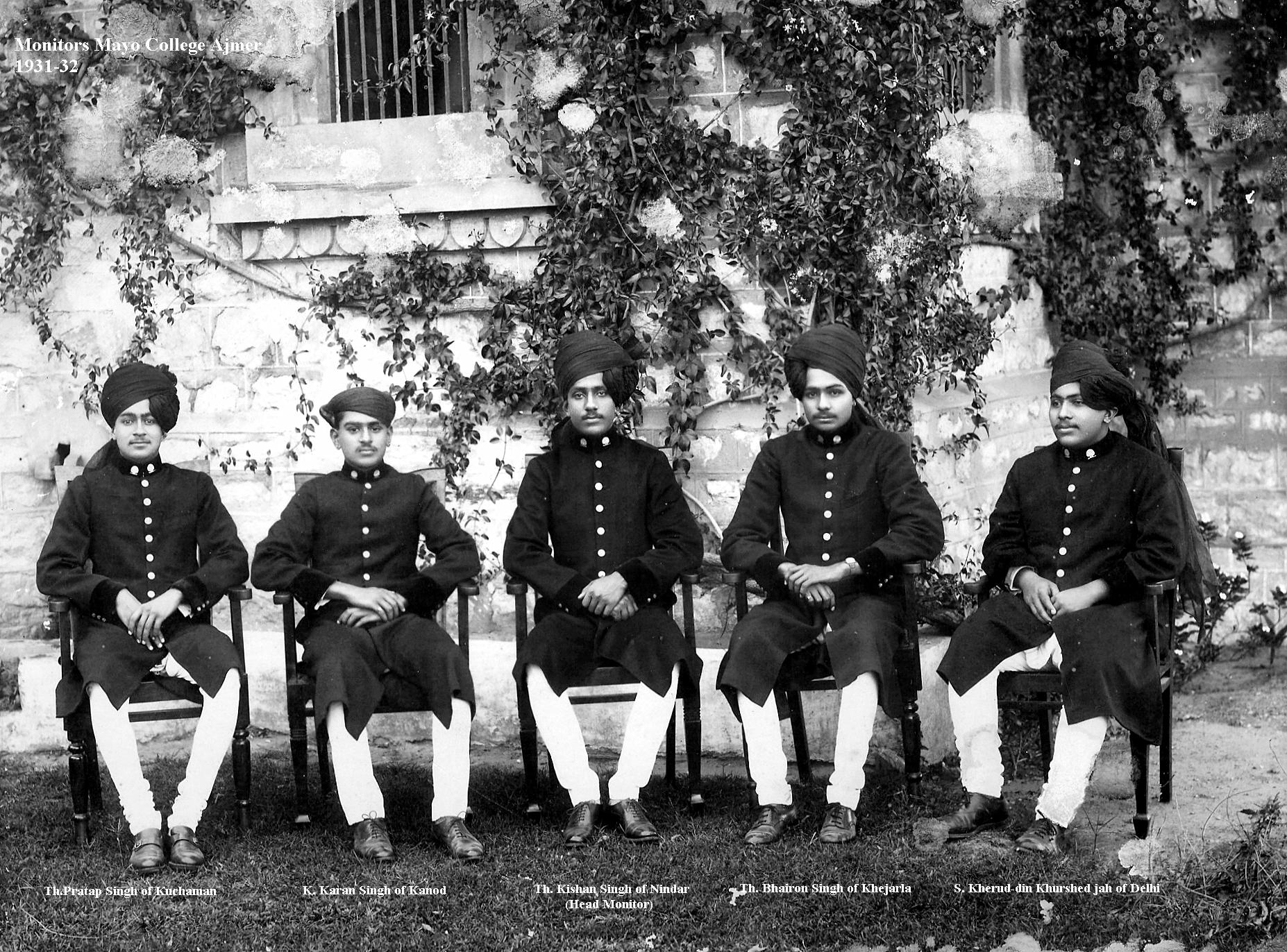
Monitors of batch of 1931-32

The school has a council of monitors consisting of students with posts dealing with school and house duties. There is a monitor and a prefect from each senior house. There are positions held by the students who excel in fields like academics, sports and co-curricular activities. Apart from the council of monitors, there are captains for each sport. Positions are held by the students of 12th class or, rarely, by juniors.

== Houses ==
There are twelve houses of which Eight are senior houses, 1 holding house (for Class 7) and three junior houses (for Class 4, 5 and 6)

The senior houses are Ajmer, Bharatpur, Jaipur, Jodhpur, Kashmir and Rajasthan, Bikaner & Tonk, Colvin. The holding house is Oman. The junior houses are Ajaypal, Durgadas and Prithviraj.

Each house can accommodate 60–75 students, except for Oman which has a capacity of 120–130 students.

== Sports ==
Mayo College has sporting facilities afor students and staff consisting of playing fields for football and hockey and a cricket ground with a view of the Aravali Hills and an old red sandstone pavilion.

Horse riding was discontinued after Independence and revived again in 1993 with ten horses. Today, Mayo College has more than 60 horses and close to 250 boys and girls are trained. Mayo has ten polo players who practice at the Sawai Man Singh II polo ground. Students are trained in events like Show Jumping, Pig Sticking, Tent Pegging, Dressage, etc. Mayo College has participated in national level polo competitions and produced players like Himmat Singh Bedla, Nagender Singh, Pratap Singh, Sarveshwar Singh, Dhruv Singh. The school participated in the SUPA International Polo Tournament held in the UK in 2008. Mayo College actively participates in the Jodhpur polo season and the Delhi Horse Show.

There are sports facilities for students and staff consisting of playing fields for football, hockey and a cricket ground with a view of the Aravali Hills and a beautiful old red sandstone pavilion called Bikaner Pavilion.

The modern glass-backed courts for squash or the historic Fanshawe courts, open to the sky. Mayo College has a nine-hole golf course which was built recently. It also has many basketball courts. There is a standard 400m track. Athletics is one of the major seasonal and coaching sports. There are around 17 tennis courts on the campus. There are 5 all-weather synthetic courts and 4-5 clay courts in the senior school. The junior school has 4 clay courts. The 10m Shooting Range is used by boys and girls (from Mayo Girls) of all classes and is one of the best shooting range available at any school in India.

=== Cricket ===
Mayo College Ground has hosted 19 first-class match stating in 1926 to 1986; since then, the ground has not first-class matches but regularly hosts other matches.

== Publications ==
Publications are supplied internally and sent to other public schools in India and abroad.

=== Mayoor ===
Mayoor was established in the late 1960s by the principal, Jack Gibson. It is a major bi-monthly newsletter with college news, updates and photos. The editorial team consists of an editor-in-chief who is an English teacher in the school and a team of editors from the student community. Mayoor used to have a Hindi section with articles and poems. This was removed when an independent Hindi newsletter called Paridrishya was established in 2006.

=== The Mayo Mail ===
The Mayo Mail is a weekly newsletter, established in 2008 by a group of students of Grade 7. It has become a publication which prints four fresh sheets every week and is called the "newspaper" of Mayo College. It consists of write-ups on school happenings and activities like the trademark Mayo "Tweets" and "Howlers".

=== Paridrishya ===
The independent Hindi magazine called Paridrishya was established in 2006. The magazine consists of articles, poems and jottings written by the school community. It has an editor-in-chief, who is a Hindi teacher in the school, and student editors.

=== Reflection ===
Reflection, established in 2007, is the student magazine. It is filled with poems, articles and facts that are illustrated with pictures. Reflection comes out three times a year.

=== College Magazine ===
The College Magazine is the yearbook of Mayo College. It has English and Hindi sections and contains reports, speeches, photographs, poems, articles and case studies of the school.

=== Other publications ===
- Cyber Quest is the IT magazine of Mayo College that contains technology-related articles and answers.
- Euphoria is an annual publication that reports on activities happening in the prize-giving function of the school.
- Zephyr – An Anthology of Poems is an annual publication that comes out in the prizegiving and contains the best poems written by the students.
- The Mayo Gazette is an annual publication that comes out during the prize-giving and contains the latest trivia of the school.

== School museum ==
The Danmal Mathur Museum is housed in Jhalawar House, which it shares with the Art School. The museum showcases antiques and an armoury section. It is considered one of the best collections found in any in-school museum of the world.

=== Postage stamp ===
Mayo College stamp

On 12 April 1986, the Indian Postal Service released a stamp showing the main building of Mayo College. The multicoloured stamp was designed by India Security Press. The first-day cover shows the emblem of the college. The cancellation was designed by Nenu Bagga.

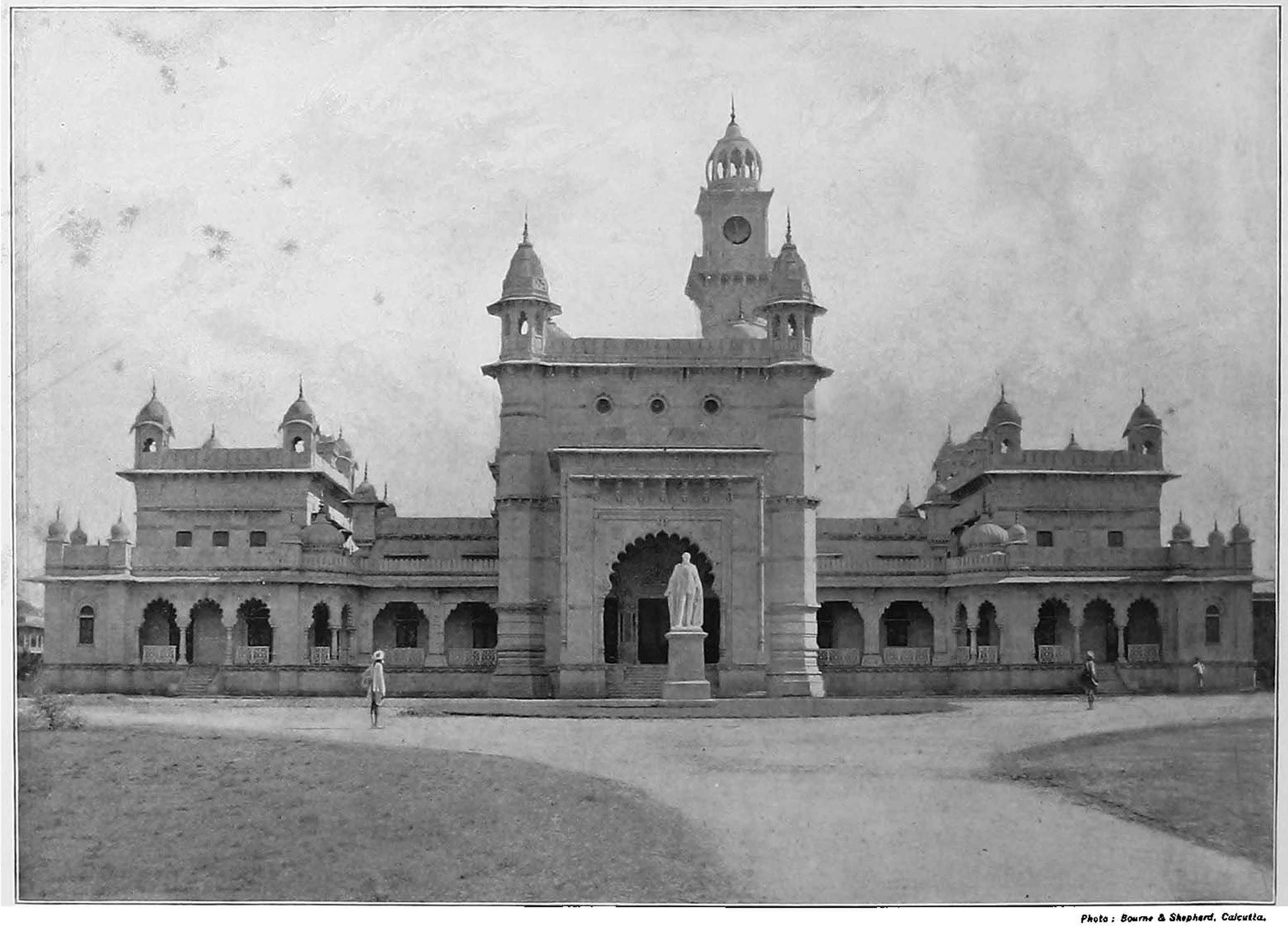
College building c. 1895

== Notable alumni ==
Alumni of Mayo College are known as Old Boys or Mayoites.

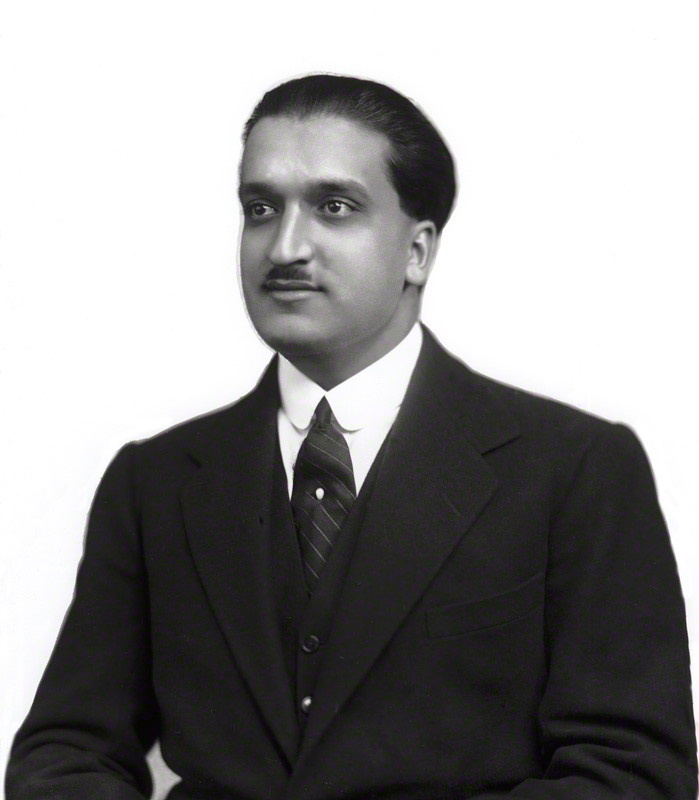
Sir Hari Singh Bahadur, last ruler of Jammu and Kashmir

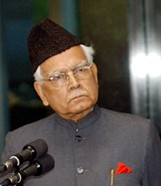
K. Natwar Singh (politician)

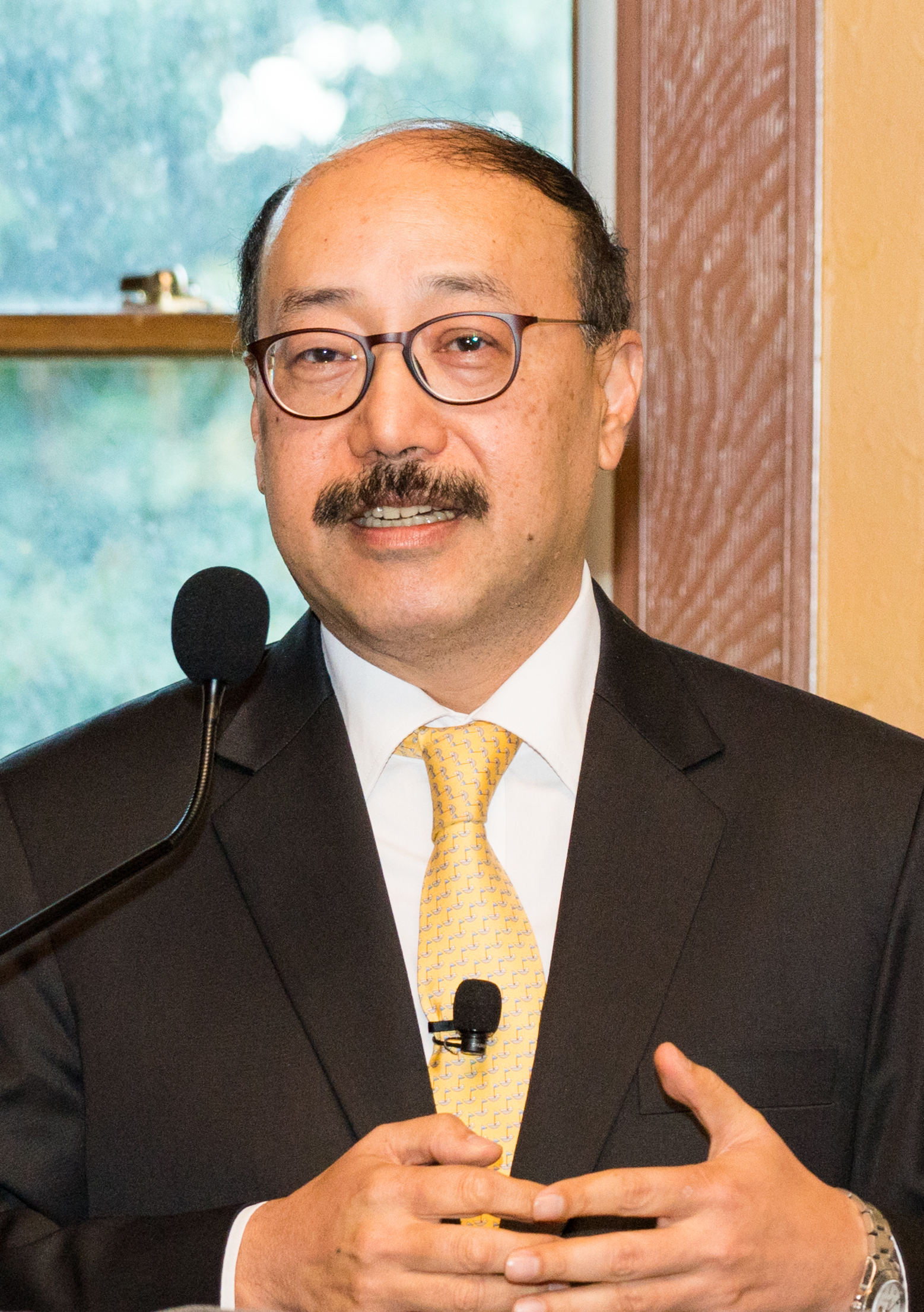
Harsh Vardhan Shringla (Diplomat)

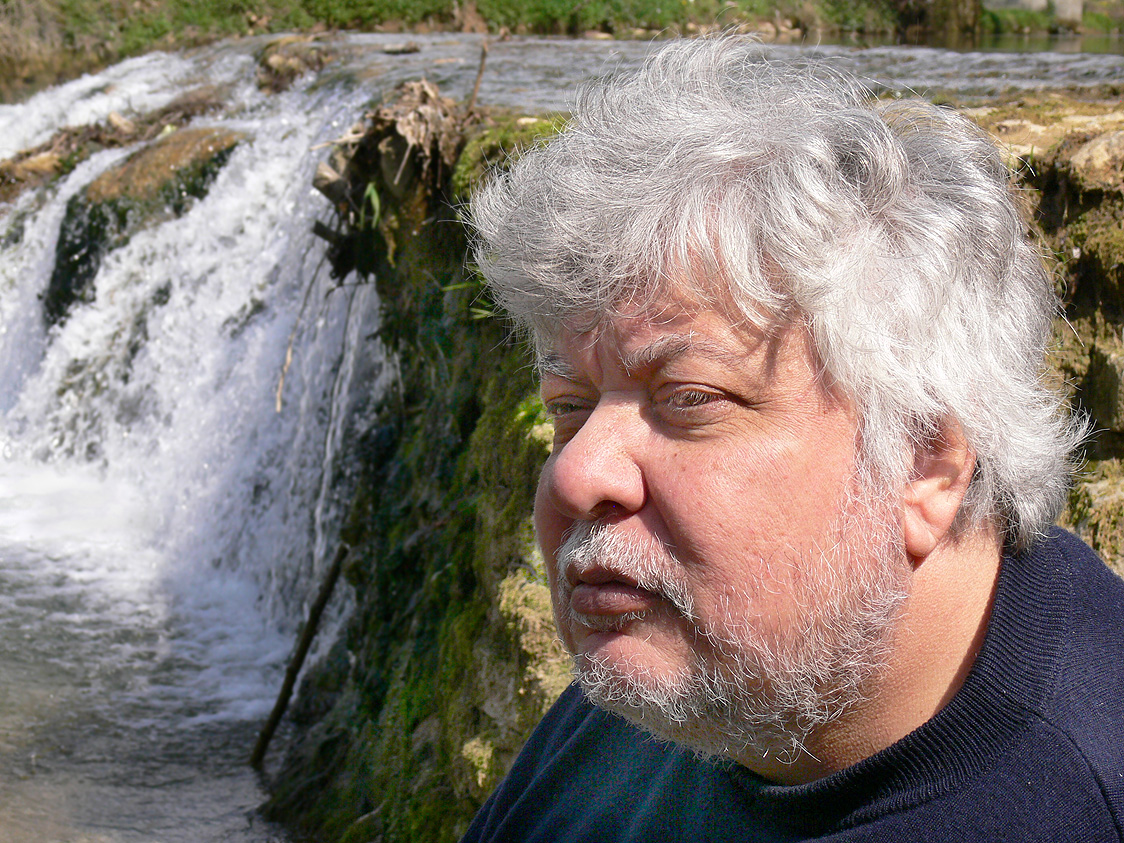
Indra Sinha (writer)

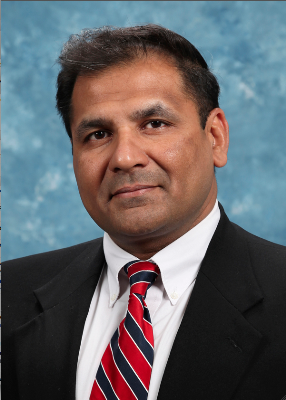
Amit Goyal (scientist and inventor)

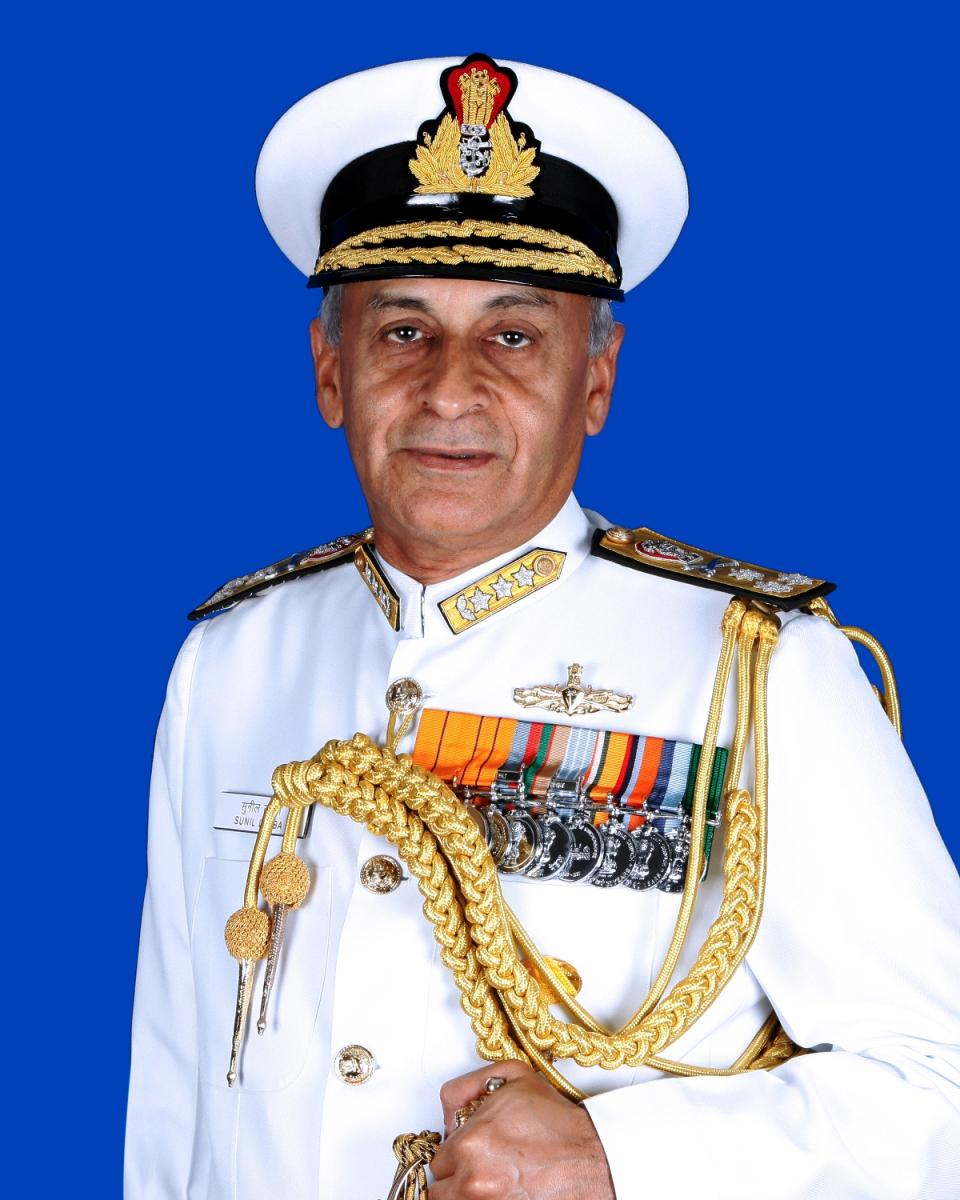
Admiral Sunil Lanba (Chief of Naval Staff)

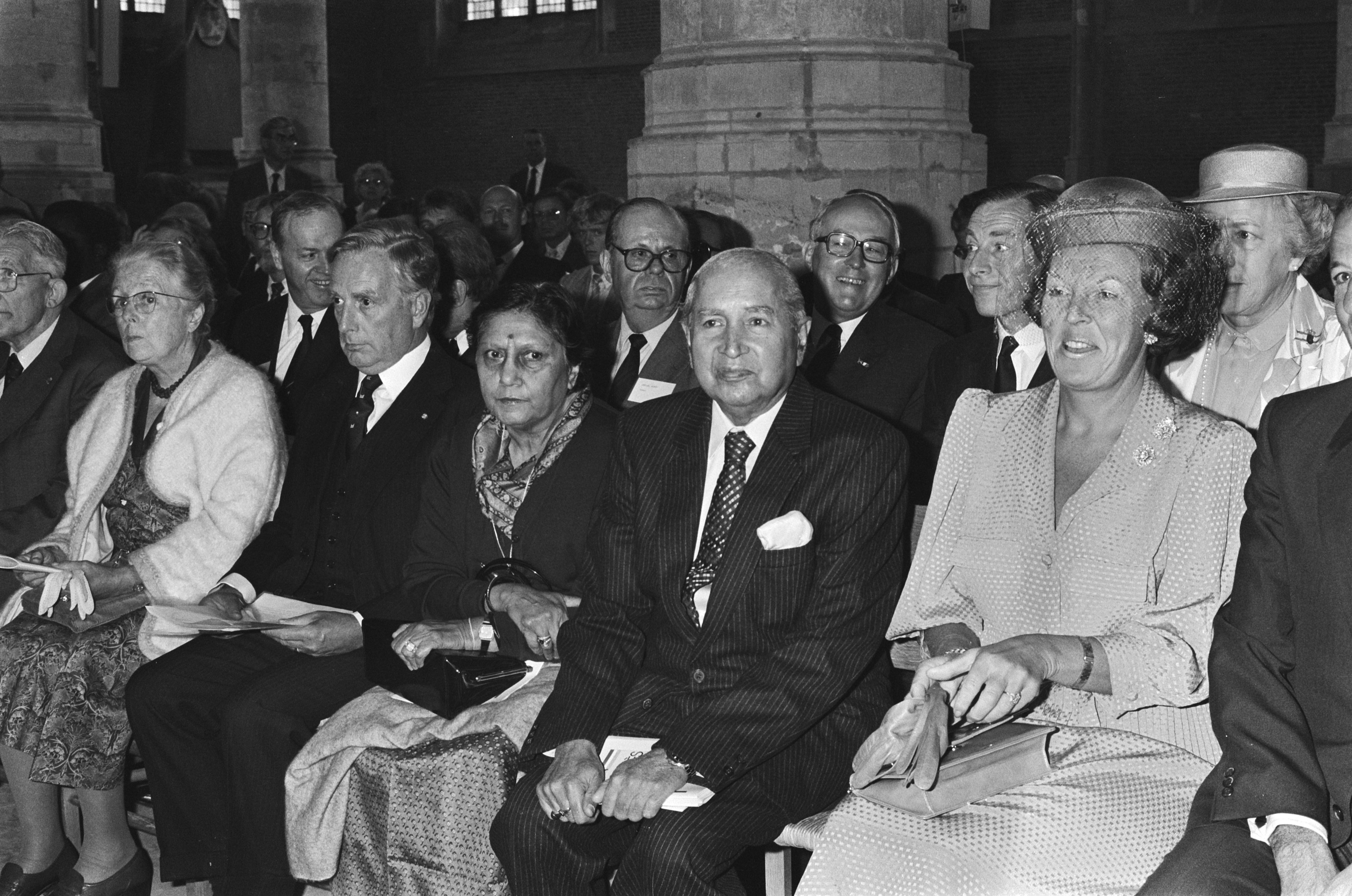
Nagendra Singh (President of the International Court of Justice)

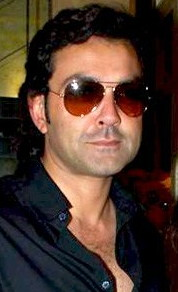
Bobby Deol (Actor)

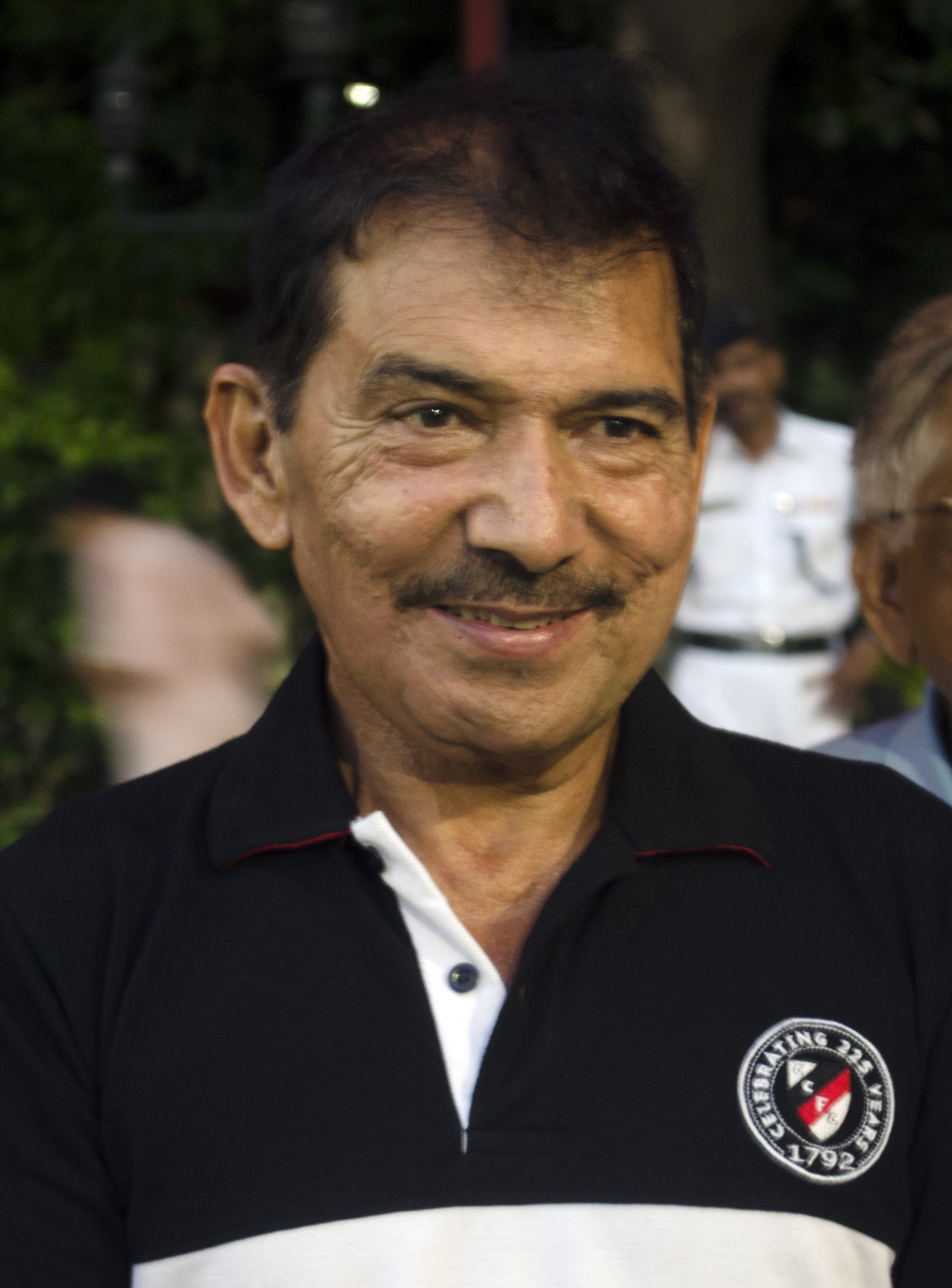
Arun Lal (Cricketer)

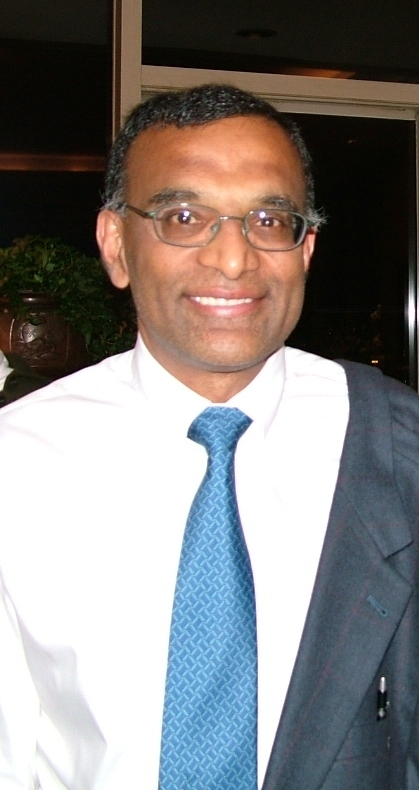
Alok Bhargava (Academician)

Additionally, the school has educated two sultans of Oman, one of whom is Said bin Taimur.

Mayo College has educated members of royal families including Bikaner, Alwar, Jammu and Kashmir, Kishangarh, Jaipur, Benares, Kangra, Udaipur, Jodhpur, Kutch, Kota, Rewa and Dewas (Junior).

Sadashiv Rao II Puar of Dewas (Junior), Muhammad Mahabat Khan III of Junagadh, Yeshwant Rao Puar of Dewas (Junior), Sawai Man Singh II of Jaipur, Hari Singh of Jammu and Kashmir, Martand Singh of Rewa, Maharana Mahendra Singh Mewar, Arvind Singh Mewar of Mewar-Udaipur, Pragmulji III of Kutch, Prince Shivraj Singh of Jodhpur of Marwar-Jodhpur and Kirit Bikram Kishore Deb Barman, erstwhile Maharaja of Tripura from the second oldest continuing ruling lineage after the Mikados of Japan.

Alumni from Mayo have served in the armed forces and others serve as members of parliament and senior civil servants. Jaswant Singh is one of the few Indian politicians to have been the Minister for Defence, Finance and External Affairs; K. Natwar Singh of the Indian Foreign Service was India's Ambassador to Pakistan and as External Affairs Minister, Admiral Sunil Lanba is the former Navy Chief.

Lt. Gen. Nathu Singh Rathore, the second Indian officer to graduate from the Royal Military College, Sandhurst, was a distinguished strategist who served as a Division Commander in Burma during the Second World War. He was offered the position of Commander in Chief of the Indian Army in 1949 but declined the position in favour of his senior, K M Cariappa.

Alumni have been Indian ambassadors to Morocco, Spain, Norway, Brazil, Libya, Switzerland and France.

The vice-chairman of Tata Motors, Ravi Kant, erstwhile chairman of Shell Oil-India, Vikram Singh Mehta, erstwhile chairman emeritus of Nestlé-India, Narendra Singh of Sarila, former chairman of Air India and Indian Airlines, Probir Sen, erstwhile chairman and MD of Axis Bank, P.J. Nayak, member of the Bank of England Monetary Policy Committee, Sushil Wadhwani, the retired chief general manager and executive director of the Reserve Bank of India and erstwhile managing director of NABARD, Yashwant Thorat, as well as Rakesh Mohan, who was deputy governor of the Reserve Bank of India all studied at Mayo. Mayo also has produced academic economists like Alok Bhargava who researches on food policy issues in developing and developed countries for formulating public policies. Mayo has produced scientists such as the eminent scientist in the field of electronic materials, Amit Goyal.

Tikaraj Aishwarya Katoch of Kangra, director of Indiabulls, donated the Kangra Amphitheatre in memory of his great-grandfather Maharaja Jai Chand Katoch who was one of the first few students of Mayo College.

Actors who attended Mayo include Bobby Deol, Vivek Oberoi, Ajay Mehta, Tinnu Anand, the filmmakers Pradip Krishen (also an environmentalist and writer of Trees of Delhi), Samir Karnik, Goldie Behl, Heeraz Marfatia and the theatre personality, Amir Raza Husain.

Journalists who studied here include Vir Sanghvi, Siddharth Varadarajan and Manvendra Singh. Writers include Vikram Chandra (Red Earth & Pouring Rain, Sacred Games) and Indra Sinha (Animal's People, shortlisted for the Man Booker Prize).

Red Fashion designer Raghuvendra Rathore, Celebrity Chef Jiggs Kalra and Artist Jaideep Mehrotra also studied here.

The school has produced sportsmen including Charu Sharma, cricketer Arun Lal, Col. Bhawani Singh, HH Sawai Padmanabh Singh of Jaipur and Lokendra Singh Ghanerao (all 3 captained India at polo over the years).

Eknath Ghate, a mathematician and winner of the Shanti Swarup Bhatnagar Prize for Science and Technology, is an alumnus of Mayo College.

Jai Pratap Singh, politician and cabinet minister in the Government of Uttar Pradesh.

== See also ==
- Mayo College Girls School
- Daly College
- Scindia School
- Rajkumar College, Raipur
- Rajkumar College, Rajkot
- Baldwin Boys High School
- Aitchison College
