= Eknath Prabhakar Ghate =

Indian mathematician

- Education: St. Stephen's College, Delhi Delhi University; University of Pennsylvania; UCLA
- Awards: Shanti Swarup Bhatnagar Award
- Scientific career
- Workplaces: Tata Institute of Fundamental Research
- Doctoral advisor: Haruzo Hida

Eknath Prabhakar Ghate is a mathematician specialising in number theory and working at the School of Mathematics, Tata Institute of Fundamental Research, Mumbai, India. He was awarded the Shanti Swarup Bhatnagar Prize for science and technology, the highest science award in India, for the year 2013 in the mathematical sciences category.

== Early life and education ==
Ghate was schooled at Mayo College, Ajmer and at the International School Manila. He studied at St. Stephen's College, Delhi and obtained his bachelor's degree from the College of Arts & Sciences, University of Pennsylvania in 1991. He earned his Ph.D. from the University of California, Los Angeles, in 1996; his doctoral advisor was Haruzo Hida.

== Career ==
Ghate is a professor at the Tata Institute of Fundamental Research. In number theory, Ghate is mostly interested in problems connected to automorphic forms, Galois representations, and the special values of L-functions.

== Awards ==
Ghate was awarded the Bhatnagar Award in 2013. Ghate was elected a Fellow of the Indian Academy of Sciences in 2014. Ghate was awarded the JTM Gibson Award for Excellence by Mayo College in 2019. He was elected Fellow of the Indian National Science Academy in 2021.
