= Amit Goyal =

American physicist and Director of the multidisciplinary and interdisciplinary RENEW

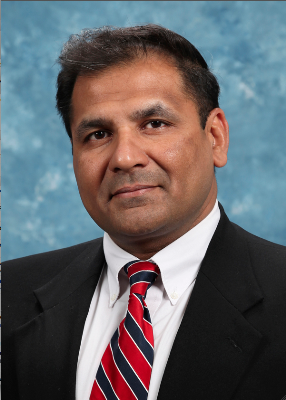
- Born: Rajasthan, India
- Education: Mayo College, IIT Kharagpur, University of Rochester, Purdue University, Tilburg University, MIT
- Occupation: Professor
- Employer: State University of New York (SUNY) at Buffalo
- Known for: Superconducting wires and their applications

Amit Goyal is a SUNY Distinguished Professor and a SUNY Empire Innovation Professor at SUNY-Buffalo. He leads the Laboratory for Heteroepitaxial Growth of Functional Materials & Devices. He is also Director of the New York State Center of Excellence in Plastics Recycling Research & Innovation, an externally funded center with initial funding of $4.5M for three years at SUNY-Buffalo. He is the founding director of the multidisciplinary and transdisciplinary RENEW (Research & Education in Energy, Environment & Water) Institute at SUNY-Buffalo in Buffalo, New York and served as director from 2015-2021. RENEW is an internally funded research institute at SUNY-Buffalo. For his contributions to UB, in 2019, he was awarded the University at Buffalo or SUNY-Buffalo President's Medal, which recognizes “outstanding scholarly or artistic achievements, humanitarian acts, contributions of time or treasure, exemplary leadership or any other major contribution to the development of the University at Buffalo and the quality of life in the UB community.” This is one of the highest recognitions given at the university.

He is a member of the National Materials and Manufacturing Board of the US National Academies. He is also presently an Emeritus Corporate Fellow at the Oak Ridge National Laboratory. Goyal was previously a UT-Battelle Corporate Fellow, a Battelle Distinguished Inventor, and an ORNL Distinguished Scientist at Oak Ridge National Laboratories in Tennessee. He was also the chair of the UT-Battelle-ORNL Corporate Fellow Council.

Goyal is one of the leading scientists worldwide in the field of advanced electronic and energy materials including High Temperature Superconductors. He has over 85 issued patents. He also has over 350 publications. In 2009, an analysis of citations and papers published worldwide in the last decade in the field of high-temperature superconductivity, between 1999–2009, conducted by Thomson Reuters Essential Science Indicators (ESI), ranked him as the most cited author worldwide during those years.

He is a member of the National Academy of Engineering and the National Academy of Inventors.

== Education ==
Goyal did his schooling at Mayo College, in Ajmer, Rajasthan, India. He received the degree of Bachelor of Technology (B. Tech) Honors degree in Metallurgical Engineering from Indian Institute of Technology, Kharagpur in 1986. He completed his M.S. in Mechanical and Aerospace Engineering from the University of Rochester in 1988. He completed his Ph.D. in Material Science and Engineering from the same institute in 1991. He has an Executive MBA from the Krannert Business School at Purdue University, an executive International MBA from Tilburg University, The Netherlands and Executive business training from the MIT Sloan School of Management.

The University of Rochester, New York, awarded him a Distinguished Scholar Medal in 2006 and the Indian Institute of Technology awarded him the Distinguished Alumnus Award in 2009.

== Career ==
Goyal was recruited to SUNY-Buffalo following an international search as founding director of the RENEW Institute and as SUNY Empire Innovation Professor in January 2015. Previously, Goyal was at the Oak Ridge National Laboratory from 1991 to December 2014. He works with the development of clean energy technologies, and in the field of electronic devices such as superconductors and photovoltaics. His research has contributed to the development of single crystal like behaviour in long lengths of superconducting materials, and of wires that allow high-temperature superconductors to allow very high performance to be obtained in a cost-effective manner. He has also made significant contributions to the fields of texture and grain boundary network control and to other electronic materials such as photovoltaics. His scientific interests have now expanded to also include plastics recycling and innovation.

In 2018, he was elected Member of the National Academy of Engineering, USA for “For materials science advances and contributions enabling commercialization of high-temperature superconducting materials.”

In 2014, he was elected Member of the National Academy of Inventors, USA for “having demonstrated a spirit of innovation in creating or facilitating outstanding inventions that have made an impact on quality of life, economic development, and the welfare of society.”

In 2011, Goyal received the inaugural E. O. Lawrence Award for Energy Science and Innovation. The E. O. Lawrence Award is given by the United States Energy Secretary on behalf of the President of the United States, for meritorious contributions to the development, use or control of atomic energy, and is officially awarded by the United States Secretary of Energy. It consists of a certificate, a gold medal and a cash prize of $20,000. The award was officially awarded in a ceremony on May 21, 2012. Goyal's award cites his "pioneering research and transformative contributions to the field of applied high temperature superconductivity, including fundamental materials science advances and technical innovations enabling large-scale applications of these novel materials". Goyal was invited by the Energy Secretary to give a special lecture associated with this award at USDOE. The lecture was live streamed and has been archived on Science Cinema and on YouTube.

In 2010, he received the 2010 R&D Magazine's Innovator of the Year Award. The award recognizes career accomplishments in scientific research and technology development, spanning disciplines from medical technology to information technology. Other recipients include Elon Musk (2007), Dean Kamen (2006) and Google's Larry Page (2012). The Innovator-Of-The-Year award is a special recognition for sustained innovative contributions.

The R&D magazine also awards the R&D100 awards to the 100 most innovative products introduced each year in any field. Goyal has received ten R&D 100 awards.

The NRI today listed him in the top 10 list of "movers and shakers" in 2010. He was also listed in top 50 Coolest Desis of 2010 by DesiClub.com.

He is the Founder, President & CEO of TapeSolar Inc., which develops solar cells. He is also the Founder, President & CEO of TexMat LLC, a Delaware-based intellectual property holding and consulting company.

Goyal's lifetime career achievements and impact have been recognized from the federal to the local level by elected representatives and officials. U.S. Representative Timothy M. Kennedy entered a statement into the Congressional Record celebrating Goyal’s achievements. “Dr. Goyal’s leadership exemplifies the transformative power of science, innovation and technology in addressing the real-world challenges our state and nation face,” Rep. Kennedy said in remarks entered into the Congressional Record. “Dr. Goyal has left an indelible mark on our nation and world, and we thank him for his tireless efforts.” In a proclamation, State Senator Sean Ryan recognized Goyal’s accomplished life in the fields of academia and science. Assemblymember Karen McMahon issued a citation, recognizing Goyal’s recent honors and his notable international contributions to science and innovation and the community. Erie County, N.Y. Executive Mark Poloncarz released an executive proclamation honoring Goyal’s accomplishments and extending “the appreciation and pride of Erie County for his remarkable scientific accomplishments, global leadership and enduring contributions to our community”. The Town of Amherst, N.Y. council, also issued a proclamation for his scientific contributions.

In 2026, Goyal was awarded an International Lifetime or Career Industrial Achievement Award from the High-Temperature Superconductivity Community.. The award notification stated that Goyal “played a central leadership role in bridging fundamental materials research with industrial deployment,” and that he is “internationally recognized as a leading figure in applied superconductivity and coated conductor technologies.” It was noted that his contributions have played a critical role in enabling superconducting applications in power grids, high-field magnets, energy storage systems, and next-generation electrical infrastructure, contributing significantly to global energy efficiency and sustainability.

== Awards and honors ==
- Elected to National Academy of Engineering (2018)
- Presidential Level, DOE's E. O. Lawrence Award in "Energy Science & Innovation" (2011)
- Elected to National Academy of Inventors (2014)
- Elected Foreign Fellow of National Academy of Sciences, India (2025)
- R&D Magazine's Innovator-of-the-Year Award (2010)
- World Technology Award in Advanced Materials (2012)
- Thirteen R&D 100 Awards
- DOE's Energy 100 Award
- Lockheed-Martin's NOVA Award
- Distinguished Scholar Award from the University of Rochester
- Distinguished Alumnus Award from the Indian Institute of Technology
- MIT's Global Indus Technovator Award (2005)
- MIT's Technology Review Magazine's TR-100 Award (1999)
- Elected Fellow of NAI, AAAS, IEEE, MRS, APS, ACERS, ASM, IOP, WTN, WIF

== Board memberships and fellowships of professional societies ==
He currently serves or has served on the advisory boards of NanoTech Briefs, the Journal of the Korean Institute of Applied Superconductivity, Recent Patents on Materials Science and Superconductor Science & Technology. He also serves on the editorial boards of Nature magazine's Scientific Reports, the Journal of Materials Research and the Journal of the American Ceramic Society, and has served as guest editor for the TMS publication, Journal of Minerals, Metals and Materials (JOM). He has served as chair of the electronics division of the American Ceramic Society.

He serves on the National Academies Panel for reviewing the NIST Materials Measurement Laboratory, the National Academies Panel on reviewing the U.S. Army Research Laboratory in the area of lllMaterials lllScience, the Fellows Advisory Committee, National Academy of Inventors (NAI), scientific advisory board, Center for Nanomaterials at Argonne National Laboratory, board of governors for the New York Sea Grant and is a member of the National Academies Intelligence Science and Technology Experts Group. He is also a member of the National Academies, National Materials & Manufacturing Board (NMMB).

He is a fellow of nine prestigious, professional societies, including the Materials Research Society, American Physical Society, the American Association for the Advancement of Science, the Institute of Electrical and Electronics Engineers, the ASM International, the Institute of Physics, the American Ceramic Society, the World Innovation Foundation and the World Technology Network.

He is a member of the National Academy of Engineering (NAE) and the National Academy of Inventors (NAI).
