= Soda, Rajasthan =

Village in Tonk district, Rajasthan, India

Coordinates: 26°24′12″N 75°30′34″E

Soda is a small village in Malpura tehsil, Tonk district, Rajasthan, India.
