= Ravi Kant (Indian executive) =

Indian businessman (born 1944)

Ravi Kant (born 1 June 1944) is an Indian executive who had served as the vice chairman from 2 June 2009 to 31 May 2014 and the managing director of Tata Motors from 29 July 2005 to 1 June 2009. He is known to lead Tata Motors in its tough times.

He is a distinguished professor at IIT Kharagpur and a visiting leader at China Europe International Business School, Shanghai.

== Education ==
Ravi Kant completed his school education from Mayo College, Ajmer. He has a Bachelor of Technology degree from the Indian Institute of Technology, Kharagpur and an MS in Industry from Aston University, UK. He is a distinguished alumnus of Mayo College, Ajmer, IIT Kharagpur and was conferred Honorary D. Sc. from Aston University. He has received distinguished alumnus awards from these institutions and Aston conferred on him a D.Sc. (Hon). He is an Industrial Professor at the University of Warwick, UK. and a distinguished professor at IIT Kharagpur.

== Career ==
Ravi Kant has nearly 50 years of corporate experience in extractive, consumer durable and automobile industries. He spent 15 years in Tata Motors where he was the CEO and managing director and later Vice Chairman of the board. He led the acquisition of Jaguar Land Rover, UK; Tata Daewoo, South Korea and established Tata Motors, Thailand and other companies which helped increase the revenue from $1.5 to $39 bn. Under his watch, Tata Motors launched Tata Ace which nearly doubled the size of the commercial vehicle market in India and Nano small car, a case study in Innovation. He has been chairman of several companies like Tata Advanced Materials, Hispano Carrocera, Spain, Tata Motors European Technical Centre, U.K, Tata Marcopolo, Tata Thailand, Tata Daewoo, etc. and director on several others like Tata Industries, Voltas, Vedanta Ltd. (one of the largest natural resource companies in the world) and Jaguar Land Rover etc.

Prior to Tata Motors, he was a director, Consumer Electronics, on the board of Philips India. He has also worked in senior positions at LML Ltd, Titan Watches, Kinetic Engineering, Hawkins and Hindalco Industries Ltd. Currently, he is on the board of Kone Ltd, Helsinki, one of the top elevator companies in the world, and Hawkins Cookers Ltd, a well-known consumer durable company. He is on the Advisory Board of Accenture India.

He was the chairman of Audit Bureau of Circulations, Advertising Standards Council of India, Society of Indian Automobile Manufacturers and executive member of Confederation of Indian Industries. He has been conferred several distinguished awards and has been invited to diverse platforms for interaction across the world.

Mr. Ravi Kant also takes a keen interest in education and health areas. He was the Chairman of IIM, Rohtak and Chairman of IIIT Allahabad. He is on advisory boards of business schools at IIT Bombay and Kharagpur. He was on the Board of National Institute of Design, Ahmedabad and Centre of Extractive Industry at the Earth Institute University of Columbia and CGIO, Business School, National University of Singapore. He was on the Advisory Board of China Europe International Business School (CEIBS), Shanghai where he is presently a visiting leader. He has been on the board of Enactus, a non-profit US organisation facilitating college students to think and act like entrepreneurs with social orientation. He has been associated with Smile Train, a US-based non-profit supporting correction of cleft palate and was on the board of New York-based WonderWork active in supporting surgeries for blindness, burns and club foot across the world. He is the Chairman of the Advisory Board of Akhand Jyoti Hospital, one of the largest eye organisations in India and that of Med therapy India promoted by doctors from Harvard Medical School and Novartis to enable gene therapy to be available at a more affordable price for the masses. He is also associated with Karkinos Healthcare to enable screening, diagnosis and treatment of cancer to the masses at affordable prices and international quality.
