= Vikram Singh Mehta =

Vikram Singh Mehta is an Indian business executive turned analyst. Best known as a former CEO of Shell India, Mehta has also served as executive chairman of the Brookings Institution. Currently, Mehta a director with the HT Media group and Chairman and Distinguished Fellow at the Centre for Social and Economic Progress (CSEP). Mehta also serves as an independent, non-executive director of Larsen & Toubro, Mahindra & Mahindra, Colgate Palmolive India, and Apollo Tyres. He is an alumnus of Mayo College, Ajmer, Rajasthan, where he completed part of his early education.

== Biography ==
Mehta comes from a family with a feudal background. His ancestors served the rulers of Mewar in present-day Rajasthan. In more recent times, his father, Jagat Singh Mehta, was a career diplomat who retired as Foreign Secretary of India. Mehta's sister, Rani Vijay, is married to Raja Sulaiman Amir Khan, son of Mohammad Amir Ahmed Khan; she is the mother of Ali Khan Mahmudabad.

Mehta completed his schooling from Mayo College in Ajmer. He then graduated from St. Stephen's College, Delhi and post-graduated from Oxford University. At Oxford, Mehta was a classmate and friend of Imran Khan and Benazir Bhutto (two time prime minister of Pakistan). All of them had PPE (Philosophy, Politics and Economics) as their common subject.

Returning to India, Mehta appeared for the UPSC Exam and was selected for the Indian Administrative Service. He joined the service but quit after only a couple of years due to incompatibility of temperament. He then went to study at the Fletcher School of Law and Diplomacy at Tufts University, USA, and secured a Master of Arts in Law and Diplomacy (MALD).

Immediately upon graduating from Tufts, he accepted an offer from Royal Dutch Shell to join its Middle East operations. No part of his extensive education at St. Stephans, Oxford or Fletcher/Tufts had anything to do with business or industry, but this was not a problem, because his job profile at Shell was mainly about high-profile networking. Subsequently, he was moved by Shell from the Middle East to India, where his networking resources would find greater scope. He worked with Shell India for about 24 years. He retired from this position on 1 October 2012 and was succeeded by Yasmine Hilton. After retiring from Shell, Vikram Mehta became the chairman of Brookings India for many years before joining the Centre for Social and Economic Progress as Chairman.
