= Jaideep Mehrotra =

Indian artist

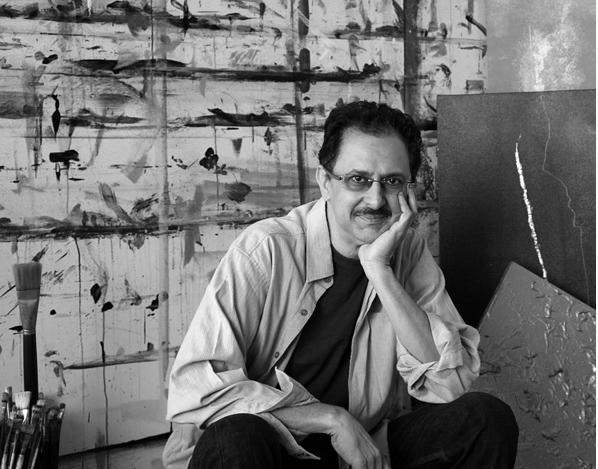
- Born: Mumbai, India
- Known for: Painting, Sculpture

Jaideep Mehrotra (born 1954) is an Indian contemporary artist based in Mumbai, India. He started his artistic career with a solo exhibition at the young age of 13 in 1967. Despite having no formal training in art, Mehrotra managed a parallel career of business and painting up until 1983, when he embraced painting as his solitary profession.

Having been a part of the art world for over four decades, Mehrotra has worked with a profusion of mediums. His works steer away from conforming to the orthodox approaches. His inventive works are both rich in visual portrayal and intense in intellectual ideology, sometimes including socio-political commentary.

He has served as a judge, panelist, jury member on various awards, competitions and various art events. He has also had work sold at various auctions over the years, including Bonhams, Osian's and Saffronart.

== Early life and education ==
Mehrotra was born in Mumbai, India. He did his early schooling at St. Mary's, Mumbai and then at Mayo College, Ajmer after which he pursued business studies from the University of Mumbai.

== Works ==
Pioneer of the digital medium as an art form in India, Mehrotra has continually pushed the conceptual thresholds of his visual language to integrate different elements in his works – the historical with the contemporary, the traditional with the modern.

The creative quest of not confining to parameters, has driven him to experiment with different mediums and subjects, both within and without the two dimensional. This foray has led him to work with oils, acrylics, fabric, resin, the digital domain of installations, web based art, Giclée, audio-visual depiction and short films.

=== Prominent exhibitions ===
- 2003: "Retracked" (Mumbai)
- 2005: "Shadow Play” (Singapore)
- 2006: “Alchemy of Play” (Dubai)
- 2009: "Growing Panes in Solitude" (New Delhi)
- 2009: “Transmogrification of a City” (Mumbai)
- 2011: “Metonymical Subtext” at Tao Art Gallery, Jehangir Art Gallery (Mumbai)
- 2017: “Reflections in Mercury” at Tao Art Gallery (Mumbai)

=== List of solo exhibitions ===
- 1967: Chetna Art Gallery (Mumbai)
- 1972: Cymroza Art Gallery (Mumbai)
- 1976: Taj Art Gallery (Mumbai)
- 1983: Taj Art Gallery (Mumbai)
- 1985: Max Mueller Bhavan (Mumbai)
- 1986: Taj Art Gallery (Mumbai)
- 1988: Taj Art Gallery (Mumbai)
- 1991: Jehangir Art Gallery (Mumbai); The Gallery (Chennai); Gallery Espace (New Delhi); Chitrakoot Gallery (Calcutta)
- 1993: Taj Mahal Hotel, (New Delhi)
- 1995: Jehangir Art Gallery (Mumbai )
- 1997: Cache' Gallery & Studio 51J (Mumbai) [Exhibitions of Giclee' Prints] Jehangir Art
- 1998: Jehangir Art Gallery (Mumbai)
- 2002: "Spanish Impressions” (Mumbai)
- 2004: Jehangir Art Gallery (Mumbai)
- 2005: Asian Civilization Museum – The Arts House (Singapore)
- 2006: 1x1 Art Space (Dubai)
- 2007: Jehangir Art Gallery (Mumbai)
- 2009: Visual Arts Gallery, India Habitat Centre (New Delhi)
- 2015: “Cognitivus" at Art Bahrain (Solo Booth, Bahrain)
- 2015: Digital Works (launch of Good Homes Art Week, Mumbai)

=== Group shows ===
- 1988: “Art for Cry” – Jehangir Art Gallery, Mumbai
- 1992: "A Man & A Woman" – Jehangir Art Gallery, Mumbai
- 1995: "Bombay"- Jehangir Art Gallery, Mumbai
- 1996: "Mother Teresa'" – Jehangir Art Gallery, Mumbai
- 1997: "50 years of Art in Mumbai" – National Gallery of Modern Art, Mumbai
- 1998: "Harmony" – Nehru Centre, Mumbai
- 1999: "Flashback-Flashforward" – Audio-Video Installation at Jehangir Art Gallery, Mumbai
- 2000: "Jesus Christ"- National Gallery of Modern Art, Mumbai
- 2001: The RPG Collection of Self Portraits – National Gallery of Modern Art
- 2002: Artist with a Difference, who influenced the Art in India – NGMA
- 2003: Auction: Of Masterpieces & Museum quality Indian Modern & Contemporary Paintings
- 2004: 50 x 30: Montage Arts, New Delhi
- 2005: "Art for God's Sake", India Habitat Centre, New Delhi
- 2007: "India on Canvas", Khushii, Mumbai
- 2009: "Black & White" Tao Art Gallery, Mumbai
- 2010: "Evolve" Tao Art Gallery, Mumbai
- 2011: Chivas Paintings at the Dubai Duty Free with Yusuf Arakkal from Bangalore and UAE artist Wael Hamdeh
- 2012: Solo Booth at India Art Festival (Tao Gallery, Mumbai)
- 2013: “Tagore, Lost & Found’ Art Bull (Art Gallery & Auction House) New Delhi
- 2013/14/15: India Art Festival (Tao Gallery, Mumbai)
- 2017: "Silent Spectacle" (Tao Gallery, Mumbai)

=== International group shows ===
- 1990: SUPERHUMANISM I & II: Marcus & Marcus Gallery (Amsterdam)
- 1991: Series of Exhibitions with 'Nicholas Treadwell Gallery' (UK)
- 1998: 50 Years of Independence: Hong Kong Land & Leasing and The Indian Consulate (Hong Kong)
- 1998: Indian Contemporary Art: RPG & Bayer, Cologne (Germany)
- 1998: Masters for a Child: Dubai (UAE)
- 1999: Accentuart Group show: London (UK)
- 1999: Towards The New Millennium: London (UK)
- 2005: Colours on Canvas: Dubai (UAE)
- 2005: Reflections Gallery (Hong Kong)
- 2007: Auction for Magic Bus: Victoria & Albert Museum, London (UK)
- 2008: “The Journey” New York Academy of Art (USA)
- 2009: "First Impressions" Art Select, Dubai & Indian Embassy of Oman
- 2009: 'Spectrum 2009' – Indian Art in Abu Dhabi (Emirates Palace) UAE

=== Other works ===
- Mehrotra has produced movie titles and publicity stills for Split Wide Open, a 1999 Dev Benegal film
- Designed book covers for Vikram Chandra's Sacred Games, and Love and Longing in Bombay (Penguin India Ltd.), The Sixth Veda by Prashant Parikh (Hamilton & Co.Publ. London), Rashmi Udaysingh's A Vegetarian in Paris and Young Rangers by Sunjoy Monga
- He has also made short films on Amitabh Bachchan and Mahatma Gandhi, which were screened at the Kala Ghoda Arts Festival
- His short films were screened at The Short Film festival of Kerala and the Indo-British Digital Film festival of the British Council
- His video work ‘Hive’ was screened at Video Wednesday Finale, in Gallery Espace, New Delhi.
- His video works ‘Hive’ and ‘Within’ were screened at ‘Spectrum 2009,’ in Abu Dhabi, Emirates Palace, UAE
- He was commissioned a painting by Chivas Regal “25 Stories High” Exhibited in the Dubai Duty Free, UAE, for the duration of July to September 2011
- In 2001, Sula commissioned Mehrotra for a painting for a signature series. Mehrotra eventually designed the label and the look for the bottle of Sula's “Satori” wine, which is the highest selling wine in India.
- He was chosen to create the corporate calendar for Jindal Steel for the year 2002
- Mehrotra was commissioned by RPG Art Foundation to do two public sculptures on Sachin Tendulkar. The first one, titled “Between the Lines” was composed of 12 vertical bars of carbon fibre and aluminum alloy. The second one, titled “MileStone” depicted Tendulkar's face using text
- Mehrotra's works of art were displayed at the Times of India Lit Fest in 2016

== Influences ==
In his youth, Mehrotra was influenced by the surrealist movement and artists such as Salvador Dalí and Bikash Bhattacharjee

== Accolades ==
- He was the first Indian artist to have his own web site, as well as the first Indian artist to have his own interactive CD-ROM
- One of 50 winners (out of 20,000 entries) in the International Digital Art Awards 2003 Exhibition, Australia
- Mehrotra was approached by a large diamond conglomerate to paint a portrait of Maharani Gayatri Devi. This turned out to be the last portrait of her painted before her death
- In January 2012, Mehrotra was listed as one of the artists whose works should be invested into, by Gulf News, one of the leading newspapers of the Middle East
- His work has been featured in and, in some cases on the covers of, top publications such as Elle Magazine, Reader's Digest, Hindustan Times, Verve, Times of India, etc.
- Was named one of the ‘Top Artists From Mumbai You Ought to Know’ by CultureTrip

== Personal life ==
- He worked in various corporations in Bombay, Dubai and Africa, before returning to India to switch careers from a businessman to an artist
- Mehrotra married his wife Seema in 1989 and they have two daughters Anushka and Mallika.
- Mehrotra's interests in helping the underprivileged and the aged are well-known. His is also known to be environmentally conscious and a concerned citizen of Mumbai. He's helped numerous charitable causes over the years
