= Mayo College Girls School =

Mayo College Girls' School
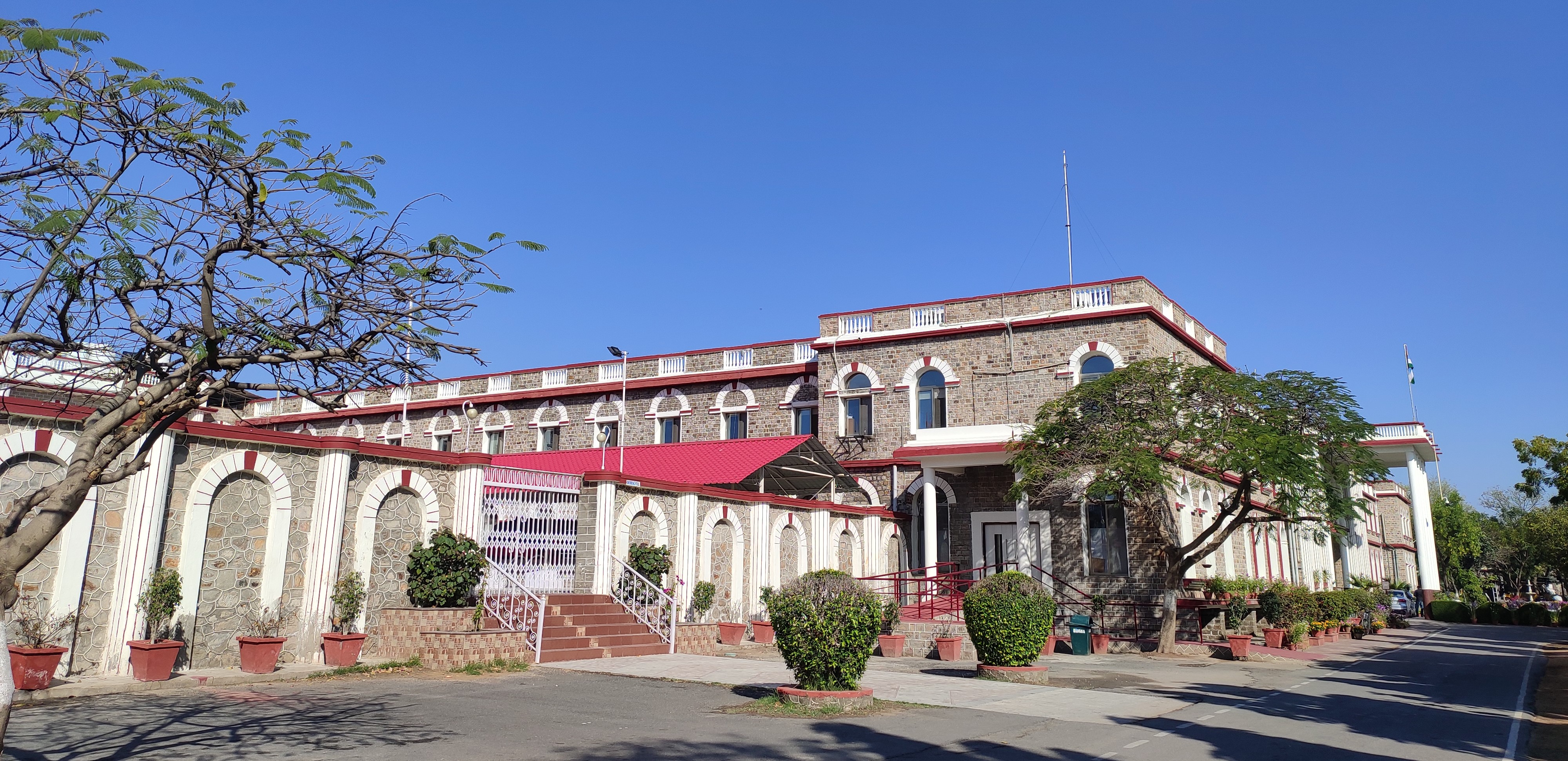
- Ajmer, Rajasthan, India

Information
- Type: Private, residential girls' school
- Motto: Let there be light
- Established: 1 August 1988; 38 years ago
- Founder: Jamila Singh
- Principal: Ms. Neeti Bhalla Saini
- Staff: 100
- Enrollment: 860
- Student to teacher ratio: 9:1
- Alumnae: Mayoites
- Website: www.mcgs.ac.in

Mayo College Girls' School is an all-girl boarding school in Ajmer, Rajasthan, India, founded in 1987. Students of the school are referred to as Mayoites.

== Overview ==
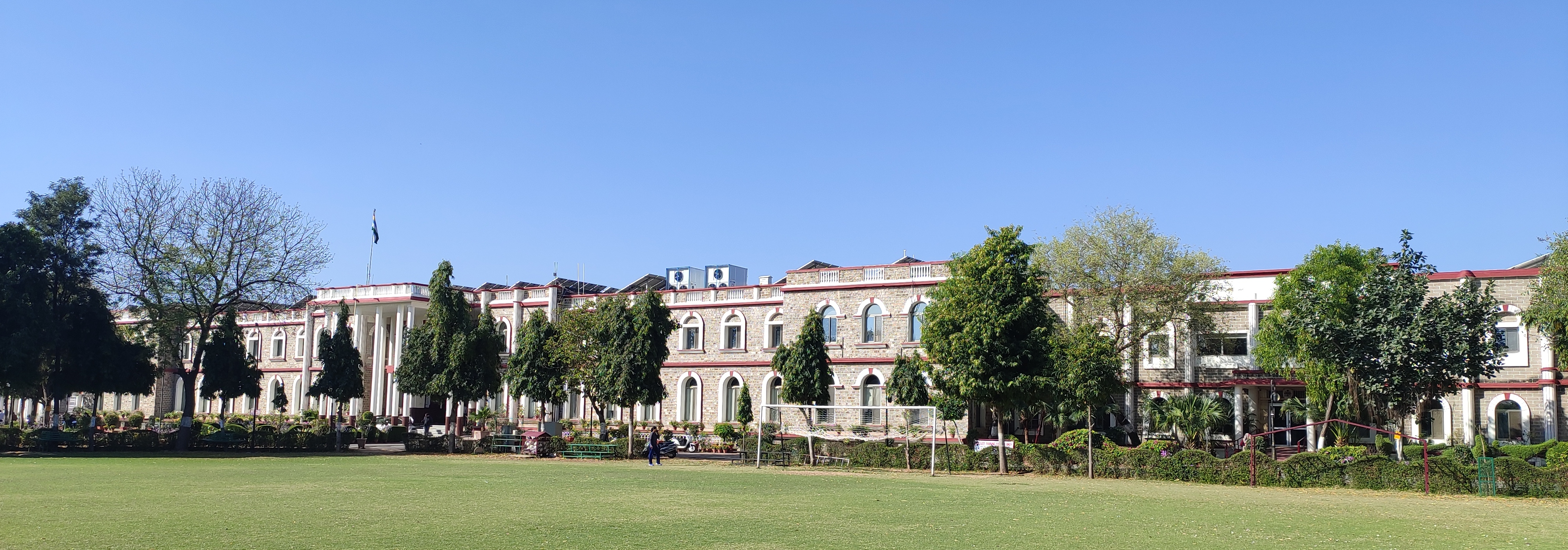

The academic period starts in April and ends in March. New students are admitted mainly in Class IV, V, VII and XI. The school is affiliated to the Council for the Indian School Certificate Examinations (CISCE). Mayo College Girls’ School now also offers the Cambridge Curriculum (IGCSE & Lower Secondary) commencing from April 2022.

Mayo College Girls' School or MCGS follows the House System, with five dormitory-like houses named after princesses of Rajasthan: Sanyogita, Padmini, Meera, Karunawati and Charumati. Additionally, Jamila Singh House accommodates students from Class IV and V in the lower dormitories and VI in the upper dormitories.The school song is called “Let There Be Light” and written by Kelsang Choeki Namgyal and composed by Deeksha Jain.

After the final examinations, students must attend a compulsory midterm educational trip to various parts of India. Students also travel around the country and abroad to take part in competitions such as the Indian Public School Conference (IPSC) and Round Square Conferences. The school also runs student-exchange programmes with schools in the UK and Australia.

During an investiture ceremony at the annual prize giving, the school captain is announced, with a team of captains including the vice captain, games captain, games coordinator, house captains, house vice captains, house prefects and society presidents. A student council mediates between the student body and the teachers, as well as suggesting ideas to improve the school.

School festivals include Holi, Lohri, Eid, Saraswati Puja, Basant Panchami and Diwali. On Gandhi Jayanti, the school helpers are given some time off and students engage in shram daan, ranging from cleaning to cooking. Interhouse Competitions are held in swimming, art and craft, music and dance, dramatics, computer science, cricket, hockey, badminton, tennis, horse riding, and basketball.

Girls from the school have represented Rajasthan in cricket, competing for the Ranji trophy.

== Notable alumnae ==
Alumnae of Mayo College Girls' School are known as Mayoites.

- Princess Shruti, Nepali royalty
- Vedita Pratap Singh, Bollywood actress
- Chhavi Rajawat, India's youngest sarpanch
- Divyakriti Singh, Equestrian (Asian Games' 2022 Gold Medalist, Arjuna Awardee' 2023)

== See also ==
- Mayo College, Ajmer
