= Charu Sharma =

Indian cricket commentator

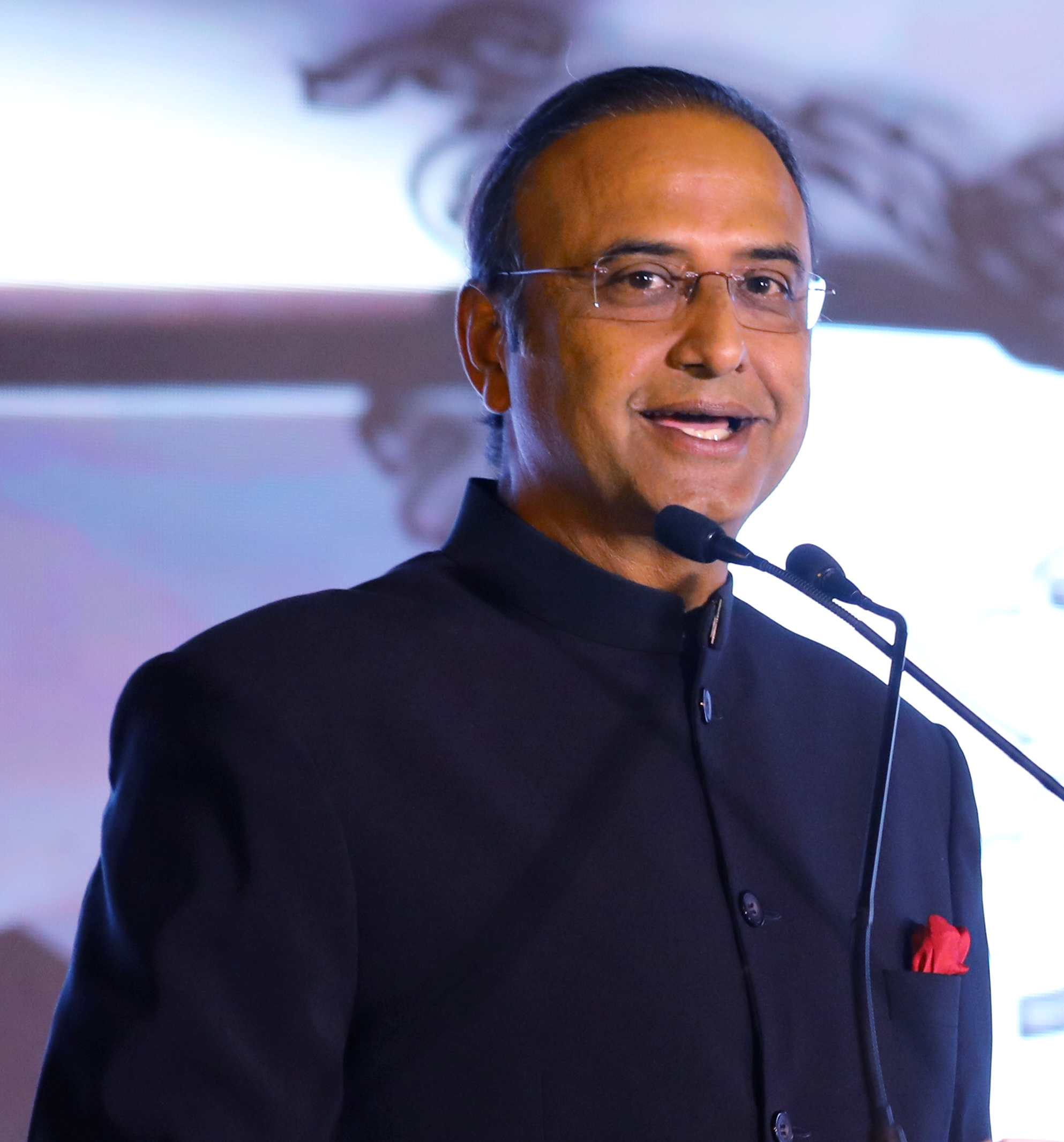
- Charu Sharma at JYOTHI HALL, Southern Star, Mysuru
- Born: Charu Sharma
- Occupations: Sports commentator; Broadcaster; compere; Quizmaster; sports administrator
- Known for: Cricket commentary; Pro Kabaddi League; Stand-in auctioneer at the 2022 Indian Premier League auction
- Spouse: Anuja Sharma
- Relatives: Anand Mahindra (brother-in-law)

Charu Sharma is an Indian sports commentator, broadcaster, compere, and quizmaster. He is a director of the Pro Kabaddi League and co-founder of Mashal Sports.

Sharma was the CEO of the Royal Challengers Bangalore franchise during the inaugural season of the Indian Premier League in 2008. Following the team's poor performance, he left the position amid reports that he had been removed by team owner Vijay Mallya through United Breweries.

In 2022, Sharma was the stand-in auctioneer for the 2022 Indian Premier League player auction after regular auctioneer Hugh Edmeades collapsed due to postural hypotension. Sharma conducted the auction from the post-lunch session on the first day until the final session on the following day, when Edmeades returned.

== Career ==
Charu Sharma is well known for his television presentations (especially on cricket) along with Mandira Bedi. He is also known as a quizmaster in television programmes and other event. He regularly hosts award shows, corporate events and contributes to teamwork and leadership seminar.

When The Economic Times talked to him about his Royal Challengers Bangalore dismissal he said: "I think I worked very hard for it, probably the hardest ever. Few matches were lost earlier and so heads were lost too. I like to believe that I was in the line of the steam of a pressure cooker that was waiting to release."

=== Pro Kabaddi ===
The Pro Kabaddi League is a professional kabaddi league founded in 2014. It is an initiative of Mashal Sports, a company which was co-founded by Anand Mahindra and Sharma, who is also a director of Mashal Sports. Star India acquired a 74% stake in Mashal Sports, and now has control over the entire league as a majority owner of Mashal Sports. Mashal Sports has acquired the rights to organize the league for a period of 10 years from International Kabaddi Federation (IKF) with an option to renew it further.

=== Coca-Cola Bahrain Premier League 2018 ===
Charu Sharma was among the invitees to promote cricket in Bahrain and held the finals of Coca-Cola Bahrain Premier League Quiz 2018.

He is also a member of the Bangalore Political Action Committee (B.PAC).

=== FUH Cast by Fakeeh University Hospital Dubai ===
FUH Cast featured cricket commentator Charu Sharma as a guest on an episode filmed at Fakeeh University Hospital, Dubai. Sharma discussed sports injuries, player health, and other medical topics.

== Personal life ==
Sharma is married to Anuja Sharma (née Mahindra). His wife is the sister of Indian industrialist Anand Mahindra.

His father was the educationist Mr N.C. Sharma, a former vice-principal of Mayo College, Ajmer.
