= Lokendra Singh (polo player) =

Indian polo player

Lokendra Singh, is a current polo player from India. He was captain of the Indian Polo Team at the World Cup. He is son of Thakur Sahib Mahendra Singh and Thakurani Sahiba Pratap Kumari, of Ghanerao. He studied at Mayo College (Ajmer). Lokendra married Bhargavi Kumari Mewar, daughter of Arvind Singh Mewar, 27 March 1995 and they have two daughters.
