= Tonk–Sawai Madhopur Lok Sabha constituency =

Lok Sabha constituency in Rajasthan

Coordinates: 26.0°N 76.0°E

Tonk-Sawai Madhopur
- Lok Sabha constituency
- Interactive Map Outlining Tonk–Sawai Madhopur Lok Sabha Constituency

Constituency details
- Country: India
- Region: North India
- State: Rajasthan
- District: Tonk Sawai Madhopur District
- Lok Sabha constituency: 12 - Tonk-Sawai Madhopur
- Assembly constituencies: Gangapur; Bamanwas; Sawai Madhopur; Khandar; Malpura; Niwai; Tonk; Deoli-Uniara
- Established: 2008
- Reservation: None

Member of Parliament
- 18th Lok Sabha
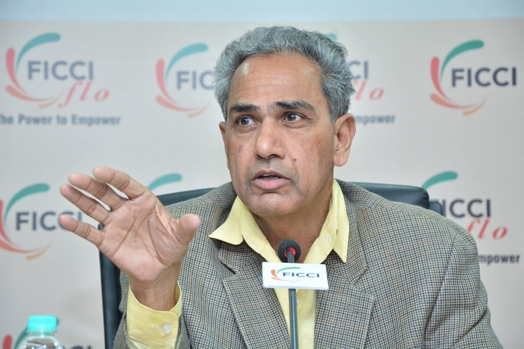
- Incumbent Harish Meena
- Party: Indian National Congress
- Elected year: 2024

Tonk–Sawai Madhopur (Hindi pronunciation: [ʈõːk səʋaːiː maːd̪ʱoːpʊɾ]) is one of the 25 Lok Sabha (Parliamentary) constituencies in Rajasthan state in western India. This constituency came into existence in 2008 as a part of the implementation of delimitation of parliamentary constituencies.

== Assembly segments ==
Presently, Tonk–Sawai Madhopur Lok Sabha comprises eight Vidhan Sabha (legislative assembly) segments. These are:

#	Name	District	Member	Party	2024 Lead
90	Gangapur	Sawai Madhopur	Ramkesh Meena	INC	INC
91	Bamanwas (ST)	Sawai Madhopur	Indira Meena	INC	INC
92	Sawai Madhopur	Sawai Madhopur	Kirodi Lal Meena	BJP	INC
93	Khandar (SC)	Sawai Madhopur	Jitendra Kumar Gothwal	BJP	INC
94	Malpura	Tonk	Kanhaiya Lal Choudhary	BJP	BJP
95	Niwai (SC)	Tonk	Ram Sahay Varma	BJP	BJP
96	Tonk	Tonk	Sachin Pilot	INC	INC
97	Deoli-Uniara	Tonk	Rajendra Gurjar	BJP	INC

Deoli-Uniara assembly segment also came into existence in 2008 as a part of the implementation of delimitation of legislative assembly constituencies. Gangapur City, Bamanwas, Sawai Madhopur and Khandar assembly segments were earlier in erstwhile Sawai Madhopur constituency. Malpura, Niwai and Tonk assembly segments were in erstwhile Tonk constituency.

== Members of Parliament ==
Year	Member	Party
Till 2004 : Constituency did not exist
2004	Namo Narain Meena	Indian National Congress
2009	Namo Narain Meena	Indian National Congress
2014	Sukhbir Singh Jaunapuria	Bharatiya Janata Party
2019	Sukhbir Singh Jaunapuria	Bharatiya Janata Party
2024	Harish Chandra Meena	Indian National Congress

== Election results ==
=== 2024 Indian general election ===
2024 Indian general election: Tonk-Sawai Madhopur
Party	Candidate	Votes	%	±%
INC	Harish Meena	623,763	50.85	+7.64
BJP	Sukhbir Singh Jaunapuria	5,58,814	45.56	−6.68
BSP	Prahalad Mali	13,144	1.07	−0.82
NOTA	None of the above	8,177	0.67	
Majority		64,949	5.29	
Turnout		12,28,602	57.13	
INC gain from BJP		Swing		

=== 2019 Indian general election ===
2019 Indian general election: Tonk-Sawai Madhopur
Party	Candidate	Votes	%	±%
BJP	Sukhbir Singh Jaunapuria	644,319	52.24	
INC	Namo Narain Meena	5,33,028	43.21	
BSP	Laxmi Kant Bairwa	23,301	1.89	
NOTA	None of the Above	8,974	0.73	
Margin of victory		1,11,291	9.03	
Turnout		12,34,467	63.44	+2.42
BJP hold		Swing		

=== 2014 ===
2014 Indian general elections: Tonk-Sawai Madhopur
Party	Candidate	Votes	%	±%
BJP	Sukhbir Singh Jaunapuria	548,537	52.59	
INC	Mohammed Azharuddin	4,13,031	39.60	
NPP	Jagmohan Meena	14,604	1.40	
Independent	Makkhan	10,523	1.01	
Margin of victory		1,35,506	12.98	+12.94
Turnout		10,43,925	61.02	+7.90
BJP gain from INC		Swing		

=== 2009 ===
2009 Indian general elections: Tonk–Sawai Madhopur
Party	Candidate	Votes	%	±%
INC	Namo Narain Meena	375,572	46.82	
BJP	Kirori Singh Bainsla	3,75,255	46.78	
BSP	Surendera Vyas	23,457	2.92	
Independent	Shiv Singh	9,594	0.12	
Margin of victory		317	0.04	
Turnout		8,02,111	53.12	
INC win (new seat)				

== See also ==
- Tonk (Lok Sabha constituency)
- Sawai Madhopur (Lok Sabha constituency)
- Tonk district
- Sawai Madhopur district
- List of constituencies of the Lok Sabha
