= Jaskaur Meena =

Indian politician

Jaskaur Meena MP
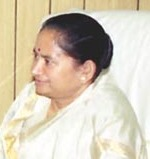
- Official portrait, 2019

Minister of State for Human Resource Development
- In office 29 January 2003 – 22 May 2004
- Prime Minister: Atal Bihari Vajpayee
- Minister: Murli Manohar Joshi
- Preceded by: Rita Verma
- Succeeded by: Mohammad Ali Ashraf Fatmi

Member of Parliament, Lok Sabha
- In office 23 May 2019 – 4 June 2024
- Preceded by: Harish Chandra Meena
- Succeeded by: Murari Lal Meena
- Constituency: Dausa
- In office 1999–2004
- Preceded by: Usha Meena
- Succeeded by: Namo Narain Meena
- Constituency: Sawai Madhopur

Personal details
- Born: 3 May 1947 (age 78) Safipura, Bamanwas, Sawai Madhopur, Rajputana Agency, British India
- Party: Bharatiya Janata Party
- Spouse: Srilal Meena
- Children: 2
- Occupation: Politician, author

Jaskaur Meena (born 3 May 1947) is an Indian politician, a former Union minister of state in Government of India and a leader of Bharatiya Janata Party. She was also in charge of the Scheduled tribes (ST) Morcha (wing) of the party at the national level.

== Positions held ==
- 1999: Elected to 13th Lok Sabha (lower house) from Sawai Madhopur constituency.
- 2003–2004: Union Minister of State, Ministry of Human Resource Development
- 2019: Elected as a Member of Parliament from Dausa constituency.
- 2021: Nominated as BJP's National Executive Council Member from Rajasthan.
- 2019: Member Standing Committee for Indian Railways.
