= Bamanwas Assembly constituency =

Legislative Assembly constituency in Rajasthan State, India

Coordinates: 26.56°N 76.56°E

Bamanwas
- Constituency No. 91 for the Rajasthan Legislative Assembly

Constituency details
- Country: India
- Region: North India
- State: Rajasthan
- District: Sawai Madhopur
- Lok Sabha constituency: Tonk-Sawai Madhopur
- Established: 2008
- Total electors: 243,526
- Reservation: ST

Member of Legislative Assembly
- 16th Rajasthan Legislative Assembly
- Incumbent Indira Meena
- Party: Indian National Congress

Bamanwas Assembly constituency is one of the 200 Legislative Assembly constituencies of Rajasthan state in India.

It is part of Sawai Madhopur district and is reserved for candidates belonging to the Scheduled Tribes.

== Members of the Legislative Assembly ==
Year	Member	Party
2008	Nawalkishor	Indian National Congress
2013	Kunji Lal	Bharatiya Janata Party
2018	Indira Meena	Indian National Congress
2023	Indira Meena	Indian National Congress

== Election results ==
=== 2023 ===
2023 Rajasthan Legislative Assembly election: Bamanwas
Party	Candidate	Votes	%	±%
INC	Indra	80,378	50.64	−1.48
BJP	Rajendra	72,513	45.69	+27.94
BSP	Manoj Kumar	1,881	1.19	−0.12
Independent	Vikas	1,750	1.1	
NOTA	None of the above	1,556	0.98	−0.39
Majority		7,865	4.95	−22.3
Turnout		158,710	65.17	+1.53
INC hold		Swing		

=== 2018 ===
Rajasthan Legislative Assembly Election, 2018: Bamanwas
Party	Candidate	Votes	%	±%
INC	Indira Meena	73,656	52.12	
Independent	Nawal Kishore Meena	35,143	24.87	
BJP	Rajendra	25,076	17.75	
BSP	Manturi	1,853	1.31	
AAP	Rajesh	1,751	1.24	
NOTA	None of the above	1,937	1.37	
Majority		38,513	27.25	
Turnout		141,308	63.64	
INC gain from BJP		Swing		

== See also ==
- List of constituencies of the Rajasthan Legislative Assembly
- Sawai Madhopur district
