= Gurjar agitation in Rajasthan =

Caste-related violence in India

2008 caste riots in Rajasthan
- Part of the Caste-related violence in India
Date	23 May 2008 – 17 June 2008 and 17 December 2010 – 7 January 2011
Location	Rajasthan
Result	37 people dead, several hundred injured, destruction of state property

The Gurjar agitation in Rajasthan were a series of protests in Rajasthan state, India, during 2008, and in later years. Violence erupted in the state of Rajasthan on 23 May 2008 when police fired on protesters belonging to the Gurjar caste who were demanding a special status under India's reservation system. In retaliation, the protesters lynched a policeman in the Bharatpur district of Rajasthan. In response, police shot at protesters as they tried to damage railway lines and government property. At least 15 were killed on the spot.

On 24 May, the Indian army was called in to help address the violence as another 15 people were killed when police shot at a mob of protesters trying to torch a police station in Sikandra.

Thousands of protesters blocked a rail route between Delhi and Mumbai. Highways had also been blocked, and state authorities cancelled many buses. Getting almost nothing from the government for their demand of a 5% quota for government jobs, Gurjars again went on to agitate in 2010. They jammed trains on the Jaipur-Delhi and Mumbai-Delhi routes. Unlike the unrest in 2008, there was no violence in 2010. In May 2015, a similar protest was organized and over thousands of Gujjars blocked railway tracks halting train traffic.

== Background ==
Gurjars— a farming and trading community — are classified by the government as an "Other Backward Class". They are part of the caste system that does not face as much exclusion or discrimination in Indian society. The Gurjar community feels it has been economically and educationally left behind and it wants to be reclassified as a Scheduled Tribe. They demand scheduled tribe status so that they can qualify for government jobs and state college seats reserved solely for such groups. The Indian government has put in place an affirmative action plan that sets aside job and educational quotas for the disadvantaged groups that it classifies as Scheduled Tribes and Scheduled Castes. These tribes, the government believes, need extra assistance to overcome centuries of neglect.

The state government, however, has so far declined to change their status. Instead, it has announced that Rs. 2.82 billion ($ 67 million) will be spent to improve schools, clinics, roads and other infrastructure in Gurjar-dominated areas. However, Gurjar leaders have said that they "do not want money". COL.Kirori Singh Bainsla, the head of the main Gurjar protest organisation issued a statement — "We do not accept the economic package."

In 2007-2008, Gurjars in Rajasthan fought police. At least 72 people were killed in that violence. In the wake of the ongoing Gurjar agitation in neighbouring Rajasthan, high alert had been sounded in the border districts of Madhya Pradesh to check any spread of violence. Rajasthan Chief Minister Vasnundhara Raje called them dacoits and Gunda. Due to elections she agreed for reservation.But in 2008 elections BJP lost in Rajasthan.

In 2015, again Kirodi Singh Bainsla starts protests by stopping trains and roads in Karoli, Dausa, Bhartpur, Sawai Madhopur etc. Then Vasundhara Raje gave 1% reservation to Gujjars, Rebaris, Luhars, Banjaras, Gadiya under MBC category.

In 2019, Congress CM Ashok Gehlot increase reservation of MBC from 1% to 5%. The Gurjar vote bank would have shifted towards the Congress, so the BJP inducted Kirori Singh Bainsla into the BJP to attract the Gurjar votebank.

== Violence ==
Gurjars mainly targeted the Jaipur-Delhi, Jaipur-Agra, and the Mumbai-Delhi transport routes as they believed it would capture the attention of the government and media altogether and resorted to violence when security forces tried to clear the roads and railways. Many Gurjars alleged the role of home minister and chief minister as provocative and oppressive. They blamed the government for giving the agitation a violent turn by firing at people gathering around Patoli village whose bodies were then preserved using salt and ice for the duration of the entire period of agitation. The demand for punishment for those responsible for killing the villagers was added to that of gaining the reservation. The news of dead bodies lying without cremation attracted many Gurjars from far off areas and even other states which added to the numbers of agitators who were now beyond the control of the police or the rapid action force and thus the Indian Army was called in. However, the violence only stopped after some assurances from the government. Police in Sikandra town fired at protesters who torched a police station and two buses and shot and wounded a policeman, said Amanjit Singh Gill, Rajasthan's director-general of police. Protesters also burned down a police station in the nearby village of Chandra Guddaji, Gill said. Fifteen demonstrators died Friday when police fired live ammunition and tear gas to halt rioting, said Singh. A police officer was also beaten to death. At least 70 injured people were hospitalized in Jaipur, the state capital, and the town of Dausa.

Demonstrators blocked a major highway linking Jaipur to Agra — site of the world-famous Taj Mahal monument — stranding thousands of people. Thousands of army, police, and paramilitary forces patrolled villages to control the violence.

Sporadic violence began again on 26 May when more than 36 towns observed a bandh to protest the police firing into the crowds. Six wagons of a goods train on its way to Agra derailed near Bandikui station in Dausa district due to tampering of rail tracks, allegedly by the Gurjars. Northern railway cancelled nine trains passing through Rajasthan and diverted several others to different routes.

== Security forces' action ==
The Indian Army, the Rapid Action Force, jawans of the Rajasthan Armed Constabulary, besides the Rajasthan police, carried out patrolling in the troubled districts of Lalshot Bharatpur, Karauli and Dausa as at least a dozen places, including Alwar, Kotputli, and Kekri in Ajmer, Pali and Rayla in Bhilwara observed bandhs (closure or curtailing of city businesses, offices and civilian activity due to security fears).

== Government's response ==
The Gurjar agitation was the outcome of years of negligence from the government in addressing the demands of Gurjars for their educational and economic progress, according to the Gurjar leaders their demands were just and they deserved reservation as the main occupation of Gurjars in areas where they lived in majority (Karauli, Bharatpur, Sawai Madhopur, Dausa, Dholpur) was agriculture and animal husbandry but they were deprived of reservation due to the political influence of rival communities who were not willing to share the benefits of reservation with the Gurjars and the Gurjar vote bank was considered to be smaller than the other communities by the government. Therefore, it was the mindset of the government to deny any reservation to the Gurjars. The government had earlier crushed a protest of farmers demanding water in Tonk district by firing at them and were employing similar tactics when a small mob was about to gather near Patoli village on the first evening of the agitation. A few villagers were killed in the firing. This incident backfired on the government and the agitation intensified as the Gurjars considered the villagers killed in the firing as 'martyrs' and a sense of sympathy and anger spread throughout the state. Consequently, major national highways (Jaipur-Agra, Jaipur-Delhi) were blocked and the Mumbai-Delhi rail line was also blocked at various places. The government which was not expecting such a backlash was forced to call in the Indian Army to maintain law and order. Jagan Gurjar, a dacoit from the Chambal ravines also participated in the agitation and was seen waving rifles on various T.V news channels. Rajasthan Chief Minister Vasundhara Raje on 25 May said there is a limit to everything and that her government will not allow Gurjars to take the state to "ransom". "It is shocking that notorious dacoits and goonda elements, wielding arms and ammunition, have joined Kirori Singh Bainsla and are indulging in arson and violence. Such things will not be tolerated," Raje stated. The government will not allow anyone to take the state to ransom and law and order into their own hands, she warned. Raje alleged "a political party from a neighbouring state was instigating and pumping money" to fuel the violence in the state. She said the government is open for talks to resolve the issue in a peaceful manner and regretted that Bainsla has been rejecting her appeals. Expressing anguish over the violent incidents that have rocked the state since the past two days resulting in the deaths of 37 people, Raje said there is a limit for "bearing such violence and arson" and warned of stringent action against those who take the state to ransom. She said it was very unfortunate that the violence comes in the wake of the Jaipur bombings which claimed 66 lives.

On 26 February, the Chief Minister announced that she would write to the Prime Minister of India recommending placing Gurjars in the category of de-notified tribes, setting aside a reservation of 4-6 per cent for them. With post-mortem examination and the last rites yet to be performed on the bodies of 18 persons killed in police firing, the Rajasthan government on made it clear that a commando operation would be the "last option" for the recovery of the bodies now in the custody of large congregations of Gurjars at Karwadi village in Bayana tehsil of Bharatpur and at Sikandra in Dausa district. "We could have recovered the bodies in less than two hours using force. However, we will not do that considering the chances of further bloodshed," Home Minister Gulab Chand Kataria said. Parliamentary Affairs Minister Rajendra Singh Rathore told journalists here that the "Gurjar reservation is a national issue. The Cabinet has decided to write to the Prime Minister requesting him to convene a meeting of Chief Ministers to review the National Scheduled Tribe Policy document of 2006."

However, on 27 May Kirori Singh Bhainsla rejected Chief Minister Vasundhara Raje's proposal for additional reservation for the agitating community. Bainsla's rejection of the proposal was unexpected, as he had earlier welcomed Raje's move to recommend in a letter to the Prime Minister four to six percent special reservation for the community.

== Political reactions ==
Congress MP Sachin Pilot, after being denied permission to visit Dausa district to meet agitating Gurjar leaders. He demanded, the Rajasthan government led by Vasundhara Raje must quit as it had lost the moral right to rule after the death of 35 people in clashes, saying, "The Vasundhara Raje government has lost its moral right and constitutional authority to continue in power. It has to admit the misgivings and must quit office now. You cannot terrorize a community."

== Other states ==
Madhya Pradesh, another state with a large Gurjar population, was put on alert after the violence. Delhi was also affected for two days due to heavy agitation of this community in mostly parts of Delhi. Community members, who have decided to assemble at Gwalior in Madhya Pradesh along with the bodies of those killed in the agitation. To keep control of the situation, additional police forces have been deployed in Morena and Chambal, keeping in view the large number of Gurjars residing in the region. Police were also keeping a strict vigil on the Rajghat bridge on the highway of Rajasthan border. In western districts of UP like Ghaziabad, Baghpat and Gautam Buddha Nagar public transport like train and buses was affected till couple of weeks due to agitation of Gurjar Community.

== See also ==
- Caste-related violence in India
