= Namo Narain Meena =

Indian politician

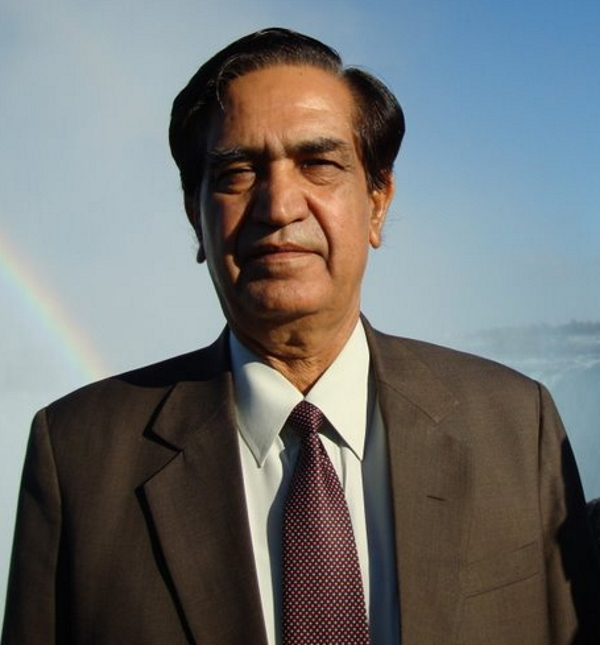

Union Minister of State for Finance
- In office 28 May 2009 – 26 May 2014
- President: A. P. J. Abdul Kalam; Pratibha Patil; Pranab Mukherjee
- Prime Minister: Manmohan Singh

Union Minister of State for Environment and Forests
- In office 23 May 2004 – 22 May 2009
- President: Pratibha Patil; Pranab Mukherjee
- Prime Minister: Manmohan Singh

Member of Parliament, Lok Sabha
- In office 13 May 2004 — 17 May 2014
- Preceded by: constituency established
- Succeeded by: Sukhbir Singh Jaunapuria
- Constituency: Tonk-Sawai Madhopur

Member, Rajasthan State Human rights Commission
- In office 11 September 2003 – 22 March 2004

Personal details
- Born: 24 December 1943 (age 82) Bamanwas, Sawai Madhopur, Rajasthan
- Party: INC
- Spouse: Kesar Meena
- Relations: Laxmi Narayan Meena (Son-in-law)
- Children: 1 son and 4 daughters
- As of 17 August, 2008

Namo Narain Meena (born 24 December 1943) is an Indian politician and retired IPS officer who is a member of Indian National Congress from the state of Rajasthan. He was a member of the 14th Lok Sabha representing the Sawai Madhopur constituency and of the 15th Lok Sabha representing the Tonk-Sawai Madhopur constituency. He served as the Minister of State in the Minister of Environment and Forests in the UPA-I government between 2004 and 2009 and as the Minister of State in the Department of Expenditure, Banking and Insurance of the Ministry of Finance in the UPA-II government between 2009 and 2014.

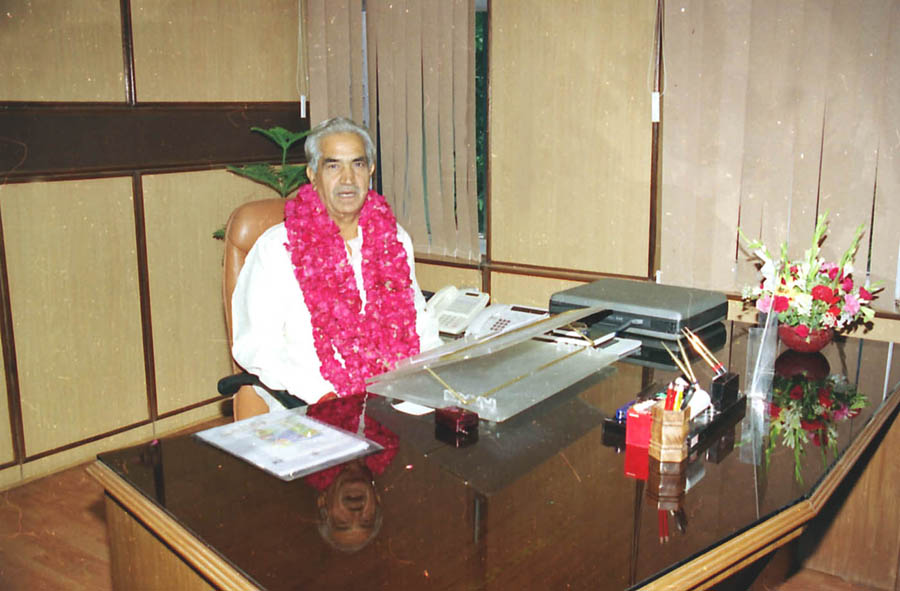
Namo Narain Meena assumes the charge of Union Minister for Environment & Forest in New Delhi on May 24, 2004.

== Political career ==
After resigning as a member of the RSHRC, Namo Narain Meena joined the Indian National Congress party and was nominated to contest from the Sawai Madhopur constituency of Rajasthan in the 2004 general election. He defeated sitting member of parliament and union minister Jaskaur Meena by a margin of 1,11,163 votes. Following his election, he was inducted into the first council of ministers under the premiership of Manmohan Singh as a Minister of State in the Minister of Environment and Forests on 22 May 2004 and served until 23 May 2009.

In the 2009 general election, he contested from the Tonk-Sawai Madhopur constituency and defeated his nearest rival and Bharatiya Janata Party candidate Kirori Singh Bainsla by a thin margin of 317 votes. Following his re-election, he was re-appointed to the union council of ministers. He was appointed the Minister of State in the Ministry of Finance on 28 May 2009 and remained in office till 26 May 2014.

He was nominated by the Indian National Congress to contest from the Dausa constituency in the 2014 general election, however he was defeated by the BJP candidate and his brother Harish Meena who later joined the Congress Party in 2018. He contested from the Tonk-Sawai Madhopur seat in the 2019 general election and was defeated by sitting MP and BJP candidate Sukhbir Singh Jaunapuria.

== Awards ==
- President's Police Medal
- President's Distinguished Service Medal
