= Niwai Assembly constituency =

Legislative Assembly constituency in Rajasthan State, India

Coordinates: 26.36°N 75.93°E

Niwai
- Constituency No. 95 for the Rajasthan Legislative Assembly

Constituency details
- Country: India
- Region: North India
- State: Rajasthan
- District: Tonk
- Lok Sabha constituency: Tonk-Sawai Madhopur
- Established: 1972
- Total electors: 284,986
- Reservation: SC

Member of Legislative Assembly
- 16th Rajasthan Legislative Assembly
- Incumbent Ram Sahay Varma
- Party: Bharatiya Janata Party
- Elected year: 2023

Niwai Assembly constituency is one of the 200 Legislative Assembly constituencies of Rajasthan state in India.

It covers Niwai and Peeplu tehsils of Tonk district and is reserved for candidates belonging to the Scheduled Castes.

== Members of the Legislative Assembly ==
Year	Member	Party
2013	Hira Lal	Bharatiya Janata Party
2018	Prasant Bairwa	Indian National Congress
2023	Ram Sahay Varma	Bharatiya Janata Party

== Election results ==
=== 2023 ===
2023 Rajasthan Legislative Assembly election: Niwai
Party	Candidate	Votes	%	±%
BJP	Ram Sahay Varma (Regar)	92,775	46.53	+10.94
INC	Prashant Bairwa	79,834	40.04	−20.78
RLP	Prahlad Narayan Bairwa	20,362	10.21	
NOTA	None of the above	1,972	0.99	−0.31
Majority		12,941	6.49	−18.74
Turnout		199,385	69.96	−0.47
BJP gain from INC		Swing		

=== 2018 ===
Rajasthan Legislative Assembly Election, 2018: Niwai
Party	Candidate	Votes	%	±%
INC	Prashant Bairwa	105,784	60.82	
BJP	Ram Sahay Verma	61,895	35.59	
NOTA	None of the above	2,253	1.3	
Majority		43,889	25.23	
Turnout		173,928	70.43	
INC gain from BJP		Swing		

== See also ==
- List of constituencies of the Rajasthan Legislative Assembly
- Tonk district
