= Indira Meena =

Indian politician

Member of the Rajasthan Legislative Assembly
- Incumbent
- Assumed office 2018
- Constituency: Bamanwas
- Preceded by: Kunji Lal Meena

Personal details
- Born: 31 October 1987 (age 38) Newai, Tonk district, Rajasthan, India
- Party: Indian National Congress
- Spouse: Ratan Lal Meena
- Children: Rakshit Meena , Dr.Yogita Meena
- Education: Postgraduate
- Committees: Scheduled Castes Welfare Committee (2019–2023)

Indira Meena (born 31 October 1987) is an Indian politician serving as a member of the Rajasthan Legislative Assembly from the Bamanwas constituency. She is affiliated with the Indian National Congress.

== Early life and education ==
Meena was born on 31 October 1987 in Niwai, Tonk district, Rajasthan, to Jagdish Prasad Meena and Prem Devi Meena. She holds a postgraduate degree. She is married to Ratan Lal Meena and has two children.

== Political career ==
Meena held various positions within the Indian National Congress before entering the state legislature, including roles in the party’s women’s and youth wings. She was elected to the Rajasthan Legislative Assembly in the 2018 state election from Bamanwas constituency, defeating the incumbent Kunji Lal Meena.

She was re-elected in the 2023 assembly elections from the same constituency.

Meena has also served in the Scheduled Castes Welfare Committee of the Rajasthan Legislative Assembly from 2019 to 2023.

== Electoral performance ==
Election results
Year	Constituency	Candidate (Party)	Votes	%	Opponent (Party)	Opponent Votes	Opponent %	Result	Ref
2023	Bamanwas	Indira Meena (INC)	80,378	50.64	Rajendra (BJP)	72,513	45.69	Won	Times of India
2018	Bamanwas	Indira Meena (INC)	73,656	52.12	Nawal Kishore Meena (IND)	35,143	24.87	Won	Times of India
