= Chhuttan Lal Meena =

Former member of Indian parliament (1971-1977)

Captain Chhuttan Lal Meena Ex-MP
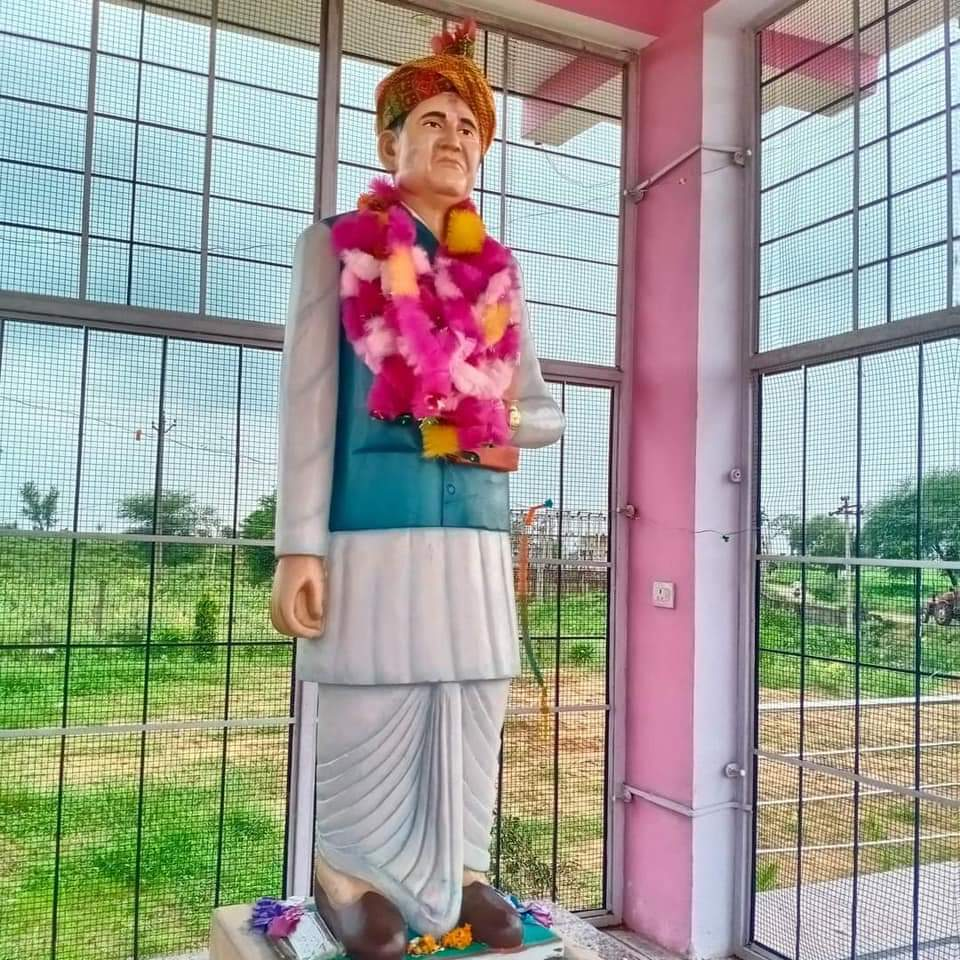
- Statue of Chhuttan Lal Meena

Member of Parliament, Lok Sabha
- In office 1971–1977
- Preceded by: Meetha Lal Meena
- Constituency: Sawai Madhopur

Member of Rajasthan Legislative Assembly
- In office 1962–1967
- Constituency: Nadoti
- In office 1957–1962
- Constituency: Mahwa

Personal details
- Born: 3 September 1920 Alwar
- Died: 8 March 1989
- Party: Indian National Congress
- Spouse: Dhapa Meena (m. 1936)
- Children: Usha Meena
- Parent: Tunda Ram Meena (father)
- Occupation: Commissioner officer; Politicians

Military service
- Allegiance: India
- Branch/service: Indian Army
- Years of service: 1938-1951
- Rank: Captain

Chhuttan Lal Meena (3 September 1920 – 8 March 1989) was a member of the Indian parliament. He represented the Sawai Madhopur, India constituency from 1971 to 1977. Prior to his election to the Indian parliament, Meena was a member of the Rajasthan Legislative Assembly from the Mahua and Nadoti assembly constituencies. Meena served in the Indian Army from 1938 to 1951. He was an ally of Farmer leader Kumbaram arya. Meena was born on 3 September 1920 in Alwar district.
