= Sawai Madhopur Lok Sabha constituency =

Lok Sabha constituency in Rajasthan

Coordinates: 26.0°N 76.4°E

Sawai Madhopur
- Former Lok Sabha constituency

Constituency details
- Country: India
- Region: North India
- State: Rajasthan
- Established: 1952
- Abolished: 2009
- Reservation: ST

Sawai Madhopur was a Lok Sabha parliamentary constituency of Rajasthan.

== Members of Parliament ==
Election	Member	Party
1952	Manik Chand Jatav-vir	Krishikar Lok Party
1957	Jagannath Pahadia	Indian National Congress
1962	Kesar Lal	Swatantra Party
1967	Meetha Lal Meena	Swatantra Party
1971	Chhuttan Lal Meena	Indian National Congress
1977	Meetha Lal Patel(Meena)	Janata Party
1980	Ram Kumar Meena	Indian National Congress
1984	Ram Kumar Meena	Indian National Congress
1989	Kirodi Lal Meena	Bhartiya Janata Party
1991	Kunji Lal Meena	Bhartiya Janata Party
1996	Usha Meena	Indian National Congress
1998	Usha Meena	Indian National Congress
1999	Jaskaur Meena	Bhartiya Janata Party
2004	Namo Narain Meena	Indian National Congress
2009	Namo Narain Meena	Indian National Congress
See: Tonk–Sawai Madhopur

== Election results ==
=== Sawai Madhopur ===
General Election, 2004: Sawai Madhopur
Party	Candidate	Votes	%	±%
INC	Namo Narain Meena	367,553	55.22	+12.58
BJP	Jaskaur Meena	256,390	38.52	−15.64
BSP	Kailash	27,332	4.11	+2.01
SJP(R)	Hari Prasad	7,235	1.09	
JP	Geeta	7,084	1.06	
Majority		111,163	16.70	+28.18
Turnout		665,594	49.67	+5.88
INC gain from BJP		Swing	+12.58	

== See also ==
- Sawai Madhopur
- List of constituencies of the Lok Sabha
- Tonk-Sawai Madhopur (Lok Sabha constituency)
