= Kesar Lal =

Indian politician (born 1929)

Member of Parliament, Lok Sabha
- In office 1962–1967
- Preceded by: Jagannath Pahadia
- Succeeded by: Meetha Lal Meena,
- Constituency: Sawai Madhopur

Personal details
- Born: 16 July 1929
- Party: Swatantra Party
- Other political affiliations: Praja Socialist Party
- Spouse: Janaki Devi

Kesar Lal (born 16 July 1929) was an Indian politician. He was elected to the Lok Sabha, the lower house of the Parliament of India, from Sawai Madhopur in Rajasthan, as a member of the Swatantra Party.
