= Ajit Singh Mehta =

Indian politician

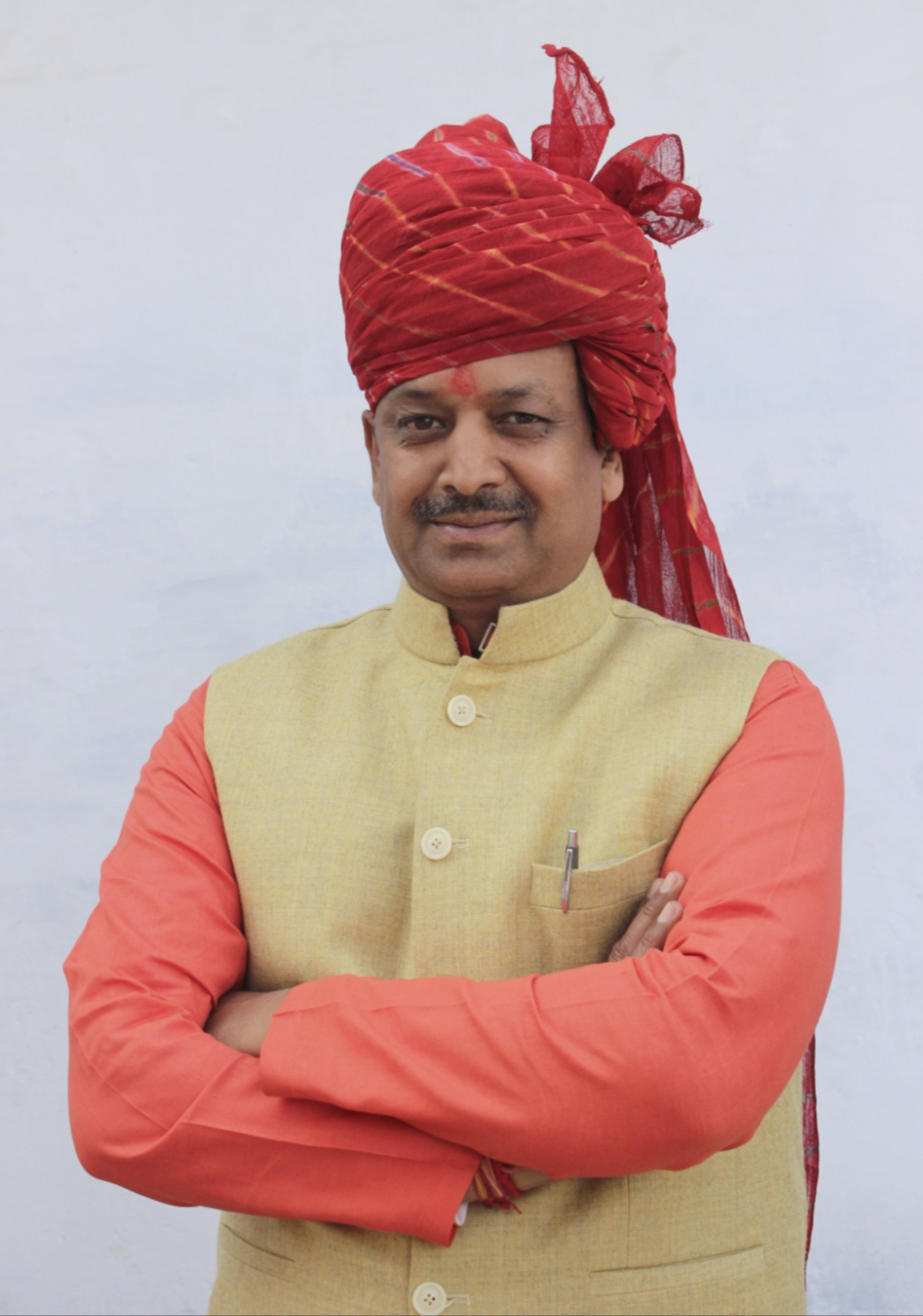

Member of Legislative Assembly, Rajasthan
- Constituency: Tonk
- In office 2013–2018
- Preceded by: Zakiya Imam
- Succeeded by: Sachin Pilot, INC

Personal details
- Born: 9 May 1965 (age 60)
- Spouse: Nirmala Mehta
- Children: Vishal Mehta
- Occupation: Politician

Ajit Singh Mehta is an Indian politician from Bharatiya Janata Party (BJP). He was a Member of Legislative Assembly (MLA) from Tonk. In the Rajasthan Assembly Election of 2013, Ajit Singh Mehta was fielded against Independent candidate Saud Saidi in Tonk. He secured 49.96% of the votes polled and won the election by 30,343 votes.

== Early life and political career ==
Mehta was born on 9 May 1965 in Tonk, Rajasthan. His father's name is Ummed Singh. He is married to Nirmala Mehta and has a son Vishal Mehta and a daughter Nitika Mehta. Prior to being an MLA, he served as the Divisional President and District Vice President.

=== 2013 Assembly election result ===
2013 Rajasthan Legislative Assembly election: Tonk
Party	Candidate	Votes	%	±%
BJP	Ajit Singh Mehta	66,845	46.96	Steady
Independent	Saud Saidi	36,502	25.64	Steady
INC	Zakiya Imam	21,645	15.21	Steady
Independent	Shiv Pratap	10,366	7.28	Steady
None of the Above	None of the Above	2,715	1.91	Steady
NCP	Ajmal Khan	1,216	0.85	Steady
CPI(M)	Akhatar Jung	1,145	0.80	Steady
BSP	Mahesh Joshi	1,036	0.73	Steady
JD(U)	Ram Prasad	881	0.62	Steady
Majority		30,343	21.32	Steady
Turnout		1,42,351	75.04	Steady
BJP gain from INC		Swing	Steady	
