= Tonk Assembly constituency =

Assembly constituency in Rajasthan

Coordinates: 26.17°N 75.80°E

Tonk
- Constituency for the Rajasthan Legislative Assembly

Constituency details
- Country: India
- Region: North India
- State: Rajasthan
- District: Tonk
- Lok Sabha constituency: Tonk-Sawai Madhopur
- Established: 1951
- Total electors: 2,24,106 (2018)
- Reservation: None

Member of Legislative Assembly
- 16th Rajasthan Legislative Assembly
- Incumbent Sachin Pilot
- Party: Indian National Congress
- Elected year: 2023
- Preceded by: Ajit Singh Mehta

Tonk Assembly constituency is a constituency of the Rajasthan Legislative Assembly covering the city of Tonk in the Tonk district of Rajasthan, India.

Tonk is one of eight assembly constituencies in the Tonk–Sawai Madhopur (Lok Sabha constituency). Since 2008, this assembly constituency is numbered 96 amongst 200 constituencies.

Currently, this seat belongs to the INC candidate Sachin Pilot, the former Deputy Chief Minister of Rajasthan who won in 2023 Rajasthan Legislative Assembly election by defeating BJP candidate Ajit Singh Mehta by a margin of 29,475 votes.

== Geographical scope ==
The constituency comprises parts of Tonk tehsil and Todaraisingh tehsil (Partly) – (I) ILRC Khareda (II) ILRC Lamba Kalan.

== Members of the Legislative Assembly ==
#	Member of Legislative Assembly	Party	From	To	Comment
01	Ram Ratan	Indian National Congress	1951	1957	two seat
02	Lalu Ram	Indian National Congress	1951	1957	two seat
03	Narayan Singh	Indian National Congress	1957	1962	two seat
04	Lalu Ram	Indian National Congress	1957	1962	two seat
05	Radha Krishan	Swatantra Party	1962	1967	
06	D. Vyas	Indian National Congress	1967	1970	
07	S.Prasad	NCJ	1970	1972	By election
08	Ajit Singh	Bharatiya Jana Sangh	1972	1977	
09	Ajit Singh	Janata Party	1977	1980	
10	Mahaveer Prasad	Bharatiya Janata Party	1980	1985	
11	Zakiya Imam	Indian National Congress	1985	1990	
12	Mahaveer Prasad	Bharatiya Janata Party	1990	1993	
13	Mahaveer Prasad	Bharatiya Janata Party	1993	1998	
14	Zakiya Imam	Indian National Congress	1998	2003	
15	Mahaveer Prasad	Bharatiya Janata Party	2003	2008	
16	Zakiya Imam	Indian National Congress	2008	2013	
17	Ajit Singh Mehta	Bharatiya Janata Party	2013	2018	
18	Sachin Pilot	Indian National Congress	2018	2023	Former Deputy Chief Minister
19	Sachin Pilot	Indian National Congress	2023	Incumbent	

== Elections result ==
=== 2023 ===
2023 Rajasthan Legislative Assembly election: Tonk
Party	Candidate	Votes	%	±%
INC	Sachin Pilot	105,812	56.12	−7.44
BJP	Ajit Singh Mehta	76,337	40.48	+8.5
SDPI	Abdul Latif	1,737	0.92	
NOTA	None of the above	1,487	0.79	−0.08
Majority		29,475	15.64	−15.94
Turnout		188,557	74.47	−2.09
INC hold		Swing		

=== 2018 ===
In 2018, Tonk legislative assembly constituency had total 2,24,106 electors. Total number of valid vote was 1,71,566. Indian National Congress candidate Sachin Pilot won and became MLA from this seat. He secured total 1,09,040 votes. Bharatiya Janata Party candidate Yunus Khan stood second with total 54,861 votes. He lost by 54,179 votes.

2018 Rajasthan Legislative Assembly election: Tonk
Party	Candidate	Votes	%	±%
INC	Sachin Pilot	109,040	63.56	
BJP	Yunus Khan	54,861	31.98	
BSP	Mohd Ali	1,785	1.04	
NOTA	None of the above	1,485	0.87	
Majority		54,179	31.58	
Turnout		171,566	76.56	
INC gain from BJP		Swing	▲16.60	

=== 2013 ===
In 2013, Tonk legislative assembly constituency had total 1,89,707 electors. Total number of valid vote was 1,42,351. Bharatiya Janata Party candidate Ajit Singh Mehta won and became MLA from this seat. He secured total 66,845 votes. Independent candidate Saud Saidi stood second with total 36,502 votes. He lost by 30,343 votes.

2013 Rajasthan Legislative Assembly election: Tonk
Party	Candidate	Votes	%	±%
BJP	Ajit Singh Mehta	66,845	46.96	Steady
Independent	Saud Saidi	36,502	25.64	Steady
INC	Zakiya Imam	21,645	15.21	Steady
Independent	Shiv Pratap	10,366	7.28	Steady
None of the Above	None of the Above	2,715	1.91	Steady
NCP	Ajmal Khan	1,216	0.85	Steady
CPI(M)	Akhatar Jung	1,145	0.80	Steady
BSP	Mahesh Joshi	1,036	0.73	Steady
JD(U)	Ram Prasad	881	0.62	Steady
Majority		30,343	21.32	Steady
Turnout		1,42,351	75.04	Steady
BJP gain from INC		Swing	Steady	

=== 2008 ===
2008 Rajasthan Legislative Assembly election: Kaman
Party	Candidate	Votes	%	±%
INC	Zakiya	48,452	44.44	
BJP	Mahaveer Prasad	37,916	34.77	
BSP	Ramkishan Gurjar	10,638	9.76	
Independent	Harinarayan Gurjar	2,403	2.20	New entry
NCP	Mohemmad Ajmal	2,306	2.11	New entry
CPI(M)	Akhtar Jang	2,164	1.98	New entry
Majority		10,536	9.67	
Turnout		108,558	62.60	
INC gain from BJP		Swing		
