= Rama Pilot =

Indian politician

Member of the Indian Parliament for Dausa
- In office 2001–2004
- Preceded by: Rajesh Pilot
- Succeeded by: Sachin Pilot

Member of the Rajasthan Legislative Assembly for Hindoli (Rajasthan Assembly constituency)
- In office 1998–2001
- Preceded by: Shantikumar Dhariwal
- Succeeded by: Hari Mohan
- In office 1990–1993
- Preceded by: Ganesh Lal
- Succeeded by: Shantikumar Dhariwal

Personal details
- Born: 12 February 1948 (age 78) Shakalpura, United Provinces, India
- Party: Indian National Congress
- Spouse: Rajesh Pilot
- Children: 2, including Sachin
- Occupation: Politician

Rama Pilot (born 12 February 1948) is an Indian National Congress (INC) politician from the state of Rajasthan. She represented Dausa in the 13th Lok Sabha. She has also represented Hindoli in the Rajasthan Legislative Assembly.

== Early life ==
Rama was born on 12 February 1948 in Shakalpura, Ghaziabad, Uttar Pradesh to Choudhry Nain Singh and his wife Harchandi Devi. She did her MA from Shyam Lal College, New Delhi where she served as General Secretary of the students' union, and LLB from Meerut University.

== Career ==
Rama Pilot was a member of the Youth Congress and was nominated by Prime Minister Indira Gandhi as an executive member of All India Congress Committee (in B.C. Cell).

She won the 1998 Rajasthan Assembly election from Hindoli by a margin of 15,530 against Pokhar Lal Saini of the Bharatiya Janata Party (BJP). Her husband Rajesh Pilot was a member of Lok Sabha. After his death in a car crash in 2000, a by-election was necessitated and the INC fielded Rama as a candidate. Out of the total 6,69,984 valid votes cast, Pilot received 3,49,439 (52.16%). BJP's candidate R. K. Sharma came second with 2,84,175 (42.41%). As an MP, she served on the Committee on Agriculture and Consultative Committee, Ministry of Rural Development.

She contested against Vasundhara Raje for Jhalrapatan but lost. During the 2003 Rajasthan Legislative Assembly election she polled 45,385 votes (36.92%) against Raje's 72,760 (59.20%). After the completion of her term, INC fielded her son Sachin Pilot for the 14th Lok Sabha.

== Personal life ==
Rama married Rajesh Pilot on 12 March 1974 with whom she had one son and one daughter. Rajesh had a car crash on 11 June 2000 at Bhandana. He was rushed to the nearby Sawai Man Singh Hospital where he succumbed to injuries. She wrote a Hindi language biography of her husband titled Rajesh Pilot: A Biography.
