= Khandar Assembly constituency =

Legislative Assembly constituency in Rajasthan State, India

Coordinates: 26.01°N 76.6°E

Khandar
- Constituency No. 93 for the Rajasthan Legislative Assembly

Constituency details
- Country: India
- Region: North India
- State: Rajasthan
- District: Sawai Madhopur
- Lok Sabha constituency: Tonk-Sawai Madhopur
- Established: 1962
- Total electors: 247,830
- Reservation: SC

Member of Legislative Assembly
- 16th Rajasthan Legislative Assembly
- Incumbent Jitendra Kumar Gothwal
- Party: Bhartiya Janata Party
- Elected year: 2023

Khandar Assembly constituency is one of the 200 Legislative Assembly constituencies of Rajasthan state in India.

It is part of Sawai Madhopur district and is reserved for candidates belonging to the Scheduled Castes.

== Members of the Legislative Assembly ==
Year	Member	Party
1962	Harphool	Swatantra Party
1967	C. Lal	Swatantra Party
1972	Ram Gopal	Indian National Congress
1977	Chunni Lal	Janata Party
1980	Chunni Lal	Bhartiya Janata Party
1985	Ram Gopal Sisodiya	Indian National Congress
1990	Chunni Lal	Bhartiya Janata Party
1993	Hari Narayan	Bhartiya Janata Party
1998	Ashok Bairwa	Indian National Congress
2003	Ashok Bairwa	Indian National Congress
2008	Ashok Bairwa	Indian National Congress
2013	Jitendra Kumar Gothwal	Bhartiya Janata Party
2018	Ashok Bairwa	Indian National Congress
2023	Jitendra Kumar Gothwal	Bhartiya Janata Party

== Election results ==
=== 2023 ===
2023 Rajasthan Legislative Assembly election: Khandar
Party	Candidate	Votes	%	±%
BJP	Jitendra Kumar Gothwal	92,059	51.07	▲12.4
INC	Ashok Bairwa	78,044	43.3	▼13.07
RLP	Ankita Verma	2,394	1.33	
AAP	Manphool Bairwa	1,992	1.11	
NOTA	None of the above	2,056	1.14	▼0.59
Majority		14,015	7.77	▼9.93
Turnout		180,253	72.73	▲1.69
BJP gain from INC		Swing		

=== 2018 ===
2018 Rajasthan Legislative Assembly election: Khandar
Party	Candidate	Votes	%	±%
INC	Ashok Bairwa	89,028	56.37	
BJP	Jitendra Kumar Gothwal	61,079	38.67	
BSP	Ramprakash Raigar	2,460	1.56	
NOTA	None of the above	2,736	1.73	
Majority		27,949	17.7	
Turnout		157,944	71.04	
INC gain from BJP		Swing		

== See also ==
- List of constituencies of the Rajasthan Legislative Assembly
- Sawai Madhopur district
