= Sanwar Lal Jat =

Indian politician (1955 - 2017)

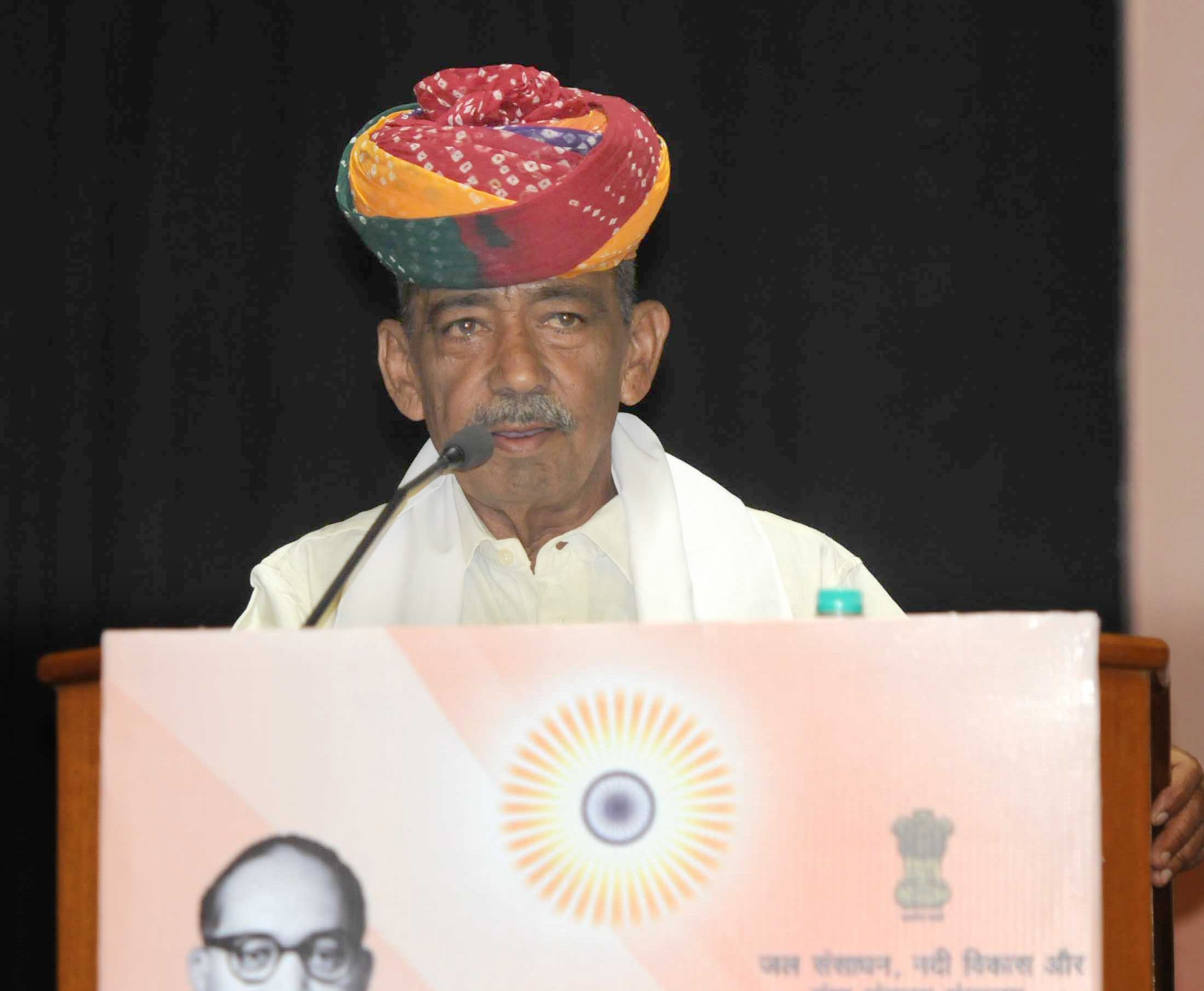
- Sanwar Lal Jat in 2016

Union Minister of State, Water Resources
- In office 9 November 2014 – 5 July 2016
- Prime Minister: Narendra Modi
- Succeeded by: Arjun Ram Meghwal

Member of Parliament for Ajmer
- In office 26 May 2014 – 9 August 2017
- Preceded by: Sachin Pilot
- Succeeded by: Raghu Sharma

Personal details
- Born: 1 January 1955 Ajmer, Ajmer State, India
- Died: 9 August 2017 (aged 62) New Delhi, India
- Party: Bharatiya Janata Party
- Spouse: Narbada Devi
- Children: 3

Sanwar Lal Jat (1 January 1955 – 9 August 2017) was the chairman of Rajasthan Kisan Aayog and MP of constituency from Ajmer, Rajasthan. He was also a cabinet minister in the Government of Rajasthan. He held portfolios of irrigation, Indira Gandhi Nahar Pariyojana, PHED, CAD, Ground Water Dev. He won election to Rajasthan Legislative Assembly from Nasirabad, Ajmer in Ajmer district. He was a senior leader of state Bharatiya Janata Party.

He was born in 1955 and educated to M Com and Ph.D. He was a professor before entering politics. He was married to Narbada and they have two sons and a daughter together. He died on 9 August 2017 in Delhi.

== Career ==
Lal served as Minister of State for Water Resources from November 2014 to July 2016.

Lok Sabha
Preceded by Sachin Pilot	Member of Parliament for Ajmer; 2014 – 2017	Succeeded by Raghu Sharma
