= Rajesh Pilot =

Indian politician (1945–2000)

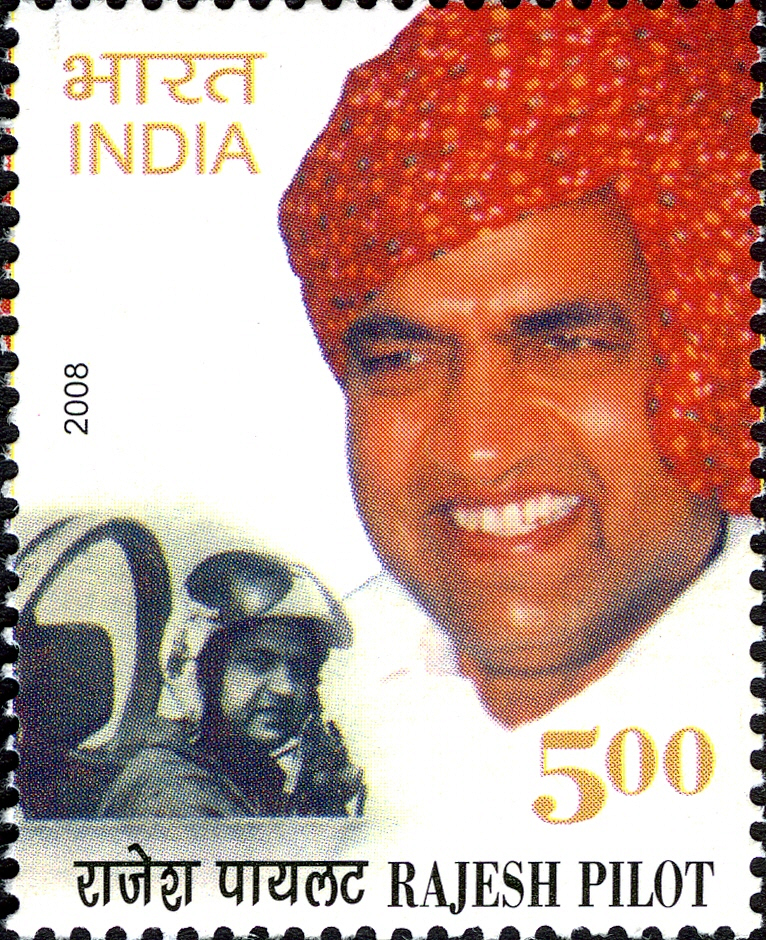
- Rajesh Pilot on a 2008 stamp of India

Minister of state Home affairs
- In office 1993–1995
- Prime Minister: P. V. Narasimha Rao

Minister of Telecommunications
- In office 1991–1993
- Prime Minister: P. V. Narasimha Rao

Minister of Surface Transport
- In office 1995–1996
- Prime Minister: Rajiv Gandhi; P. V. Narasimha Rao
- In office 1985–1989

Member of the Indian Parliament for Dausa
- In office January 1991 – 11 June 2000
- Preceded by: Nathu Singh
- Succeeded by: Rama Pilot
- In office 1984–1989
- Preceded by: Nawal Kishore Sharma
- Succeeded by: Nathu Singh

Member of the Indian Parliament for Bharatpur
- In office 1980–1984
- Preceded by: Ram Kishan
- Succeeded by: Natwar Singh

Personal details
- Born: Rajeshwar Prasad Bidhuri; 10 February 1945 Vedpura, Gautam Buddha Nagar, Greater Noida, Uttar Pradesh, India
- Died: 11 June 2000 (aged 55) Jaipur, Rajasthan, India
- Party: Indian National Congress
- Spouse: Rama Pilot
- Children: 2, including Sachin Pilot
- Military career
- Allegiance: India
- Branch: Indian Air Force
- Service years: 1966–1979
- Rank: Squadron Leader
- Conflicts: Indo-Pakistani War of 1971

Squadron Leader Rajeshwar Prasad Bidhuri (10 February 1945 – 11 June 2000), also known as Rajesh Pilot (UK: /ˈrɑːdʒɪʃ pɑːɪllʌtə/) was an Indian politician, a minister in the Government of India and a former Indian Air Force officer. He belonged to the Indian National Congress party and represented the Dausa constituency in Lok Sabha. His original name was Rajesh Bidhuri. Rajesh Pilot died on 11 June 2000 in a car crash near Jaipur.

== Early life ==
Rajesh Pilot was born in Vaidpura village in Uttar Pradesh on February 10, 1945 and he lost his armyman-father Jai Dayal Singh Bidhuri at an early age. Following the death, Rajesh Pilot moved to Delhi and worked as a milkman at affluent Delhi localities and later went on to join the Indian Air Force. It was in 1979 when Pilot got his ministerial break where his meeting with then Congress President Indira Gandhi began the chapter of politics in his life, and later he registered his first election win in Bharatpur and Dausa, after getting a ticket to contest the elections. Apart from this, he even emerged as a prominent Gurjar leader in the community.

== Military career ==
He enlisted in the Indian Air Force. Rajeshwar Prasad, was commissioned in the General Duties (Pilot) branch of the Indian Air Force as a pilot officer on 29 October 1966. He was promoted to flying officer on 29 October 1967 and to flight lieutenant on 29 October 1971. He fought in the Indo-Pakistan War of 1971 as a bomber pilot, flying a modified de Havilland Canada DHC-4 Caribou. He was promoted to squadron leader on 29 October 1977. On 8 August 1978, he was seconded to the Ministry of Agriculture.

Local residents claimed that Prasad was one of the pilots, along with Suresh Kalmadi, who bombed Mizo insurgents in March 1966 during the Mizo National Front uprising. This issue was mentioned by Prime Minister Narendra Modi in the Parliament in Lok Sabha in August 2023. Sachin Pilot, son of Rajesh Pilot denied his father's involvement.

In late 1979, Prasad resigned his commission while posted in Jaisalmer to enter politics, under the influence of his friend Rajiv Gandhi, who later became the Prime Minister of India.

== Political career ==
He contested the 1980 Lok Sabha elections as an INC candidate from Bharatpur, changing his surname to Pilot at the same time. Pilot emerged as a prominent Gurjar leader in India. In his first election as a candidate, Pilot defeated the former queen of Bharatpur State.

On an official visit to the Netherlands in 1988, his Dutch counterpart, learning Pilot was a former IAF officer, arranged for him to fly a RNLAF F-16; the IAF subsequently invited Pilot to test a new MiG-29 following his return to India.

He sent Chandraswami to prison when he was the Internal Security Minister. Later, he lost the election for the post of Congress president to Sitaram Kesri, but remained in the front line of Congress leaders.

== Death and legacy ==
Rajesh Pilot died at the Sawai Man Singh Hospital in Jaipur on 11 June 2000 after his jeep collided with a State transport bus in Bhandana on his way to Jaipur Airport for a flight to Delhi.

India Post issued a commemorative postage stamp of ₹5.00 in honour of him on 11 June 2008.

In New Delhi and Gurgaon, a road was named in his honour. In Rewari, a roundabout was named after him.

== Political career ==
Year	Event
1980	Won Lok Sabha elections from Bharatpur, Rajasthan
1984	Won Lok Sabha elections from Dausa, Rajasthan
1985–89	Minister for Surface Transport
1987	Set up the Jai Jawan Jai Kisan Trust
1991–93	Minister for Telecommunication, Government of India
1993–95	Minister for Internal Security, Government of India
1995–96	Minister for Surface Transport
1996	Won Lok Sabha elections from Dausa, Rajasthan
1999	Won Lok Sabha elections from Dausa, Rajasthan

== Medals ==

Poorvi Star; Special Service Medal
Sangram Medal	Sainya Seva Medal	25th Anniversary Independence Medal	9 Years Long Service Medal
