= Ram Kumar Meena =

Indian politician

Member of Parliament, Lok Sabha
- In office 1980–1989
- Preceded by: Meetha Lal Patel
- Succeeded by: Kirodi Lal Meena
- Constituency: Sawai Madhopur

Personal details
- Party: Indian National Congress
- Spouse: Keshar Devi

Ram Kumar Meena was an Indian politician. He was elected to the Lok Sabha, the lower house of the Parliament of India, from Sawai Madhopur in Rajasthan, as a member of the Indian National Congress.
