= Kirori Singh Bainsla =

Indian Army officer (1940–2022)

Colonel Kirori Singh Bainsla
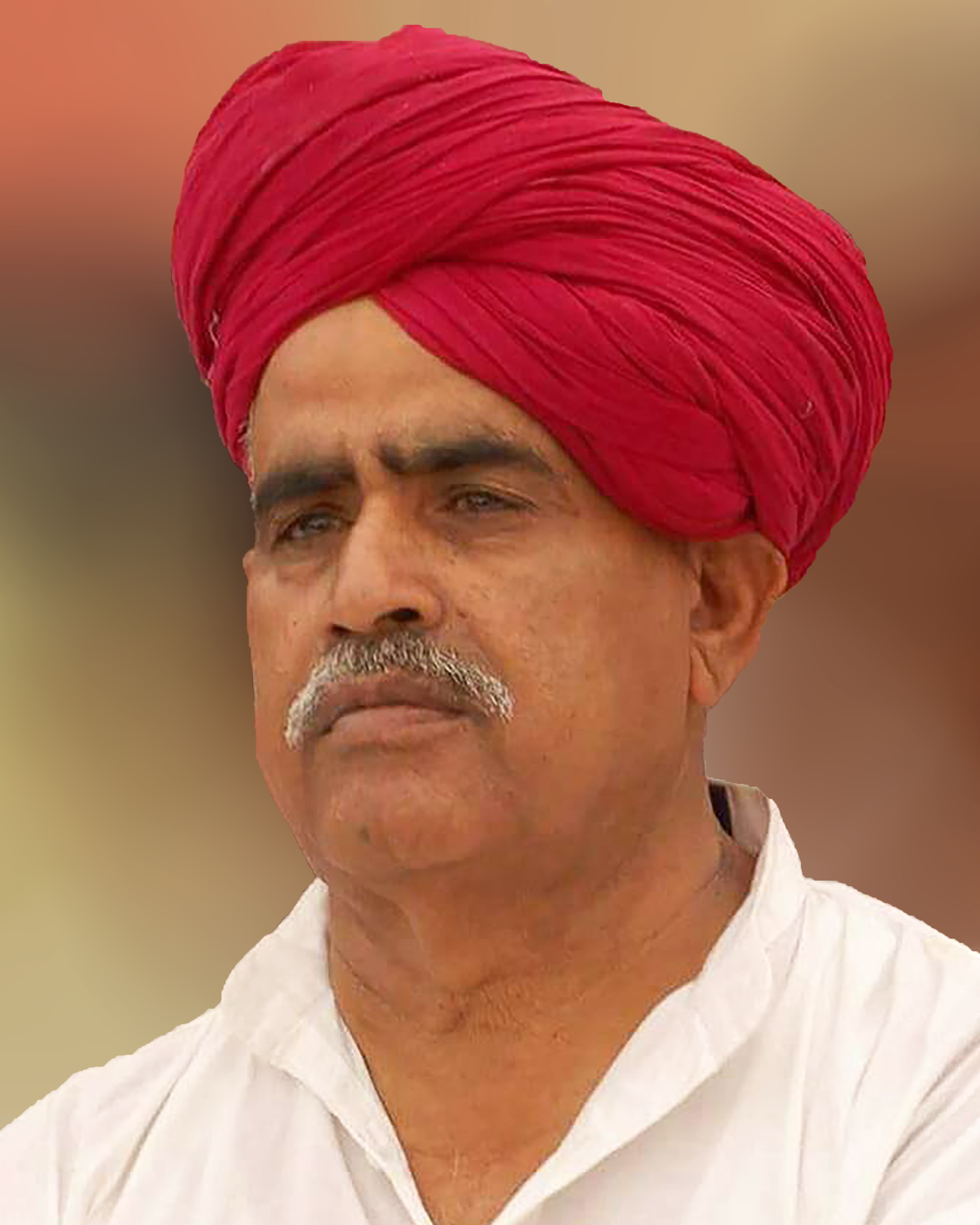
- Bainsla in his white kurta and red turban
- Born: Kirori Singh Bainsla; 12 September 1939; Mundia, Karauli District (post 1997), Rajputana Agency, British Raj
- Died: 31 March 2022 (aged 82); Jaipur, Rajasthan, India
- Other name: Col. Kirori Bainsla
- Citizenship: Indian Prime
- Education: Maharaja College, Jaipur
- Occupations: Defence Personnel, Social worker, Politician
- Years active: 1961-1991 (Indian Army), 1995-2022 (Social movement)
- Known for: Affirmative Action, Social Reform
- Political party: Bharatiya Janata Party
- Movement: Gurjar Reservation Movement
- Spouse: Resham Bainsla (m. 1954; died 1996)
- Children: Son : 1 Daulat Singh Bainsla ( Ret.Colonel) 2 Jai Sigh Bainsla ( Major General ) 3 Vijay Singh Bainsla Daughter: Sunita Bainsla
- Mother: Dhupi Devi
- Military career
- Allegiance: India
- Branch: Indian Army
- Service years: 1961–1991
- Rank: Lieutenant-Colonel
- Conflicts: Sino-Indian War; Indo-Pakistani War of 1965; Indo-Pakistani War of 1971
- Website: https://www.jagran.com/rajasthan/jaipur-kirori-singh-bainsla-of-rajasthan-retired-colonel-passed-away-he-became-colonel-from-soldier-life-profile-jagran-special-22586263.html

Kirori Singh Bainsla (12 September 1939 – 31 March 2022) was a lieutenant colonel of the Indian Army and in 2007 led a caste-based protest movement in the state of Rajasthan, demanding reservation as Scheduled Tribe for the Gurjar community in Rajasthan. He headed the Rajasthan Gurjar Arakshan Sangharsh Samiti which led the wave of protests across the state. Col Bainsla is known for his trademark red pagri (turban) and white dhoti and kurta. He is popularly known as पटरीवाले बाबा (Patriwale Baba).

Protest marches organised by the movement have at times led to violent clashes with civil authorities and have been accompanied by extensive property damage. In 2007, Bainsla led a protest in which 27 people were killed in clashes with police, and as of May 2008, a total of 43 people had died in such clashes, most of them protesters. Bainsla blamed police for the violence. In May 2015, a similar protest was organised by thousands of gurjars under the leadership of Bainsla. 73 people from the community have been killed in the agitation for reservation.

Bainsla was charged for his involvement in the protests. Following one major protest, Rajasthan High Court issued a notice of contempt against him for allegedly violating a previous order to keep the protests within lawful bounds. After 25 days of protest and five days of negotiations, Bainsla's meetings with representatives of the Chief Minister of Rajasthan, Vasundhara Raje, resulted in the Gurjar, Gadia Lohar, Banjara, and Rebari, and Gadaria communities being awarded the status of Special Backward Class. The legislation was challenged in the Rajasthan High Court, and benefits under the legislation were restricted. Under Bainsla's leadership, Rajasthani gurjars continued to campaign for special reservation (5%), which finally was provided in February 2019 with the passing of The Rajasthan Backward Classes (Reservation of Seats in Educational Institutes in the State and of Appointments and Posts in Services under the State) Amendment Bill 2019.

== Personal life ==
=== Early life ===
Kirori Singh was born to Bacchu Singh Bainsla and Dhupi Devi in village Mundia, about 30 km from Hindaun, Rajasthan. He had two older brothers and a younger sister. As a young child, he attended the local village school in Mundia and matriculated from MSJ College, Bharatpur. He graduated from Maharaja College, Jaipur with a Bachelor of Arts.

As per prevailing traditions, Bainsla married at the young age of 14 to Resham (Hindi: रेशम) of village Deolen (Hindi: देवलिन), around 12 km from Mundia. She was sarpanch of Mundia at the time of her demise on 16 November 1996. They have a daughter and three sons. The eldest son,Daulat Singh, retired from the Indian Army as a Colonel. The second son,Jai Singh, serves as a Major General, while the third son, Vijay Bainsla, is a SocioPolitical leader with BJP. His daughter, Sunita Bainsla, retired from the Revenue Service.

In 1960, Kirori Singh Bainsla started teaching English at the Government Multi Purpose Higher Secondary School in Gangapur City, Sawai Madhopur, Rajasthan. Following in the footsteps of his father who served in the British Indian Army and two older brothers already enlisted, Kirori Bainsla joined the Indian Army in 1962. Being ineligible for joining as a commissioned officer due to his marital status, Bainsla enlisted as a sepoy. It is speculated that his military background enabled him to organise the Gurjar agitation movement with precision and on the large scale which characterized it.

=== Military career ===
Bainsla fought in the Sino-Indian war of 1962 and received an emergency commission as a second lieutenant on 2 August 1964. As an infantry officer in the Guards regiment, he fought in the Indo-Pakistani War of 1965 and became a prisoner of war. Promoted to lieutenant on 2 August 1966, Bainsla received a regular commission as a Second Lieutenant on 1 April 1970 (seniority from 20 January 1966), with promotion to Lieutenant from the same date (seniority from 20 January 1968). Dubbed the "Rock of Gibraltar" by his seniors in the army, Bainsla was promoted to captain on 20 January 1972 and to major on 20 January 1979. On 3 April 1988, now in the Indian Army Pioneer Corps, Bainsla was promoted to lieutenant colonel by selection, denoting him as an officer suitable for higher command. He however voluntarily took early retirement from the Army on 10 June 1991, transferring to the reserves.

=== Social service ===
During the agitation movement of 2008, Bainsla once said_{,} "Only a bullet or a letter (granting the demands) can remove me from here." He said that one of the reasons he was engaged in this cause was because his children are settled and so he could think of his "greater family".

Post retirement, Bainsla moved to his native village and began holding small meetings, attending large social gatherings, and addressing the community on the need for educating the children. He spoke against the prevalent practice of child marriage, exhorted women to educate their daughters, and motivated youngsters to prepare for competitive examinations. He spoke against extravagant expenditure, and of making a debt free society. His much acclaimed slogan "Good Health, Good Education, Educated Mothers and a Debt Free Society" resonated well with people within the community. In his social meetings in the rural areas of Rajasthan, Bainsla would often speak on the value of education by asking "How many people take a book or magazine or newspaper back home in the evening for their families to read?".

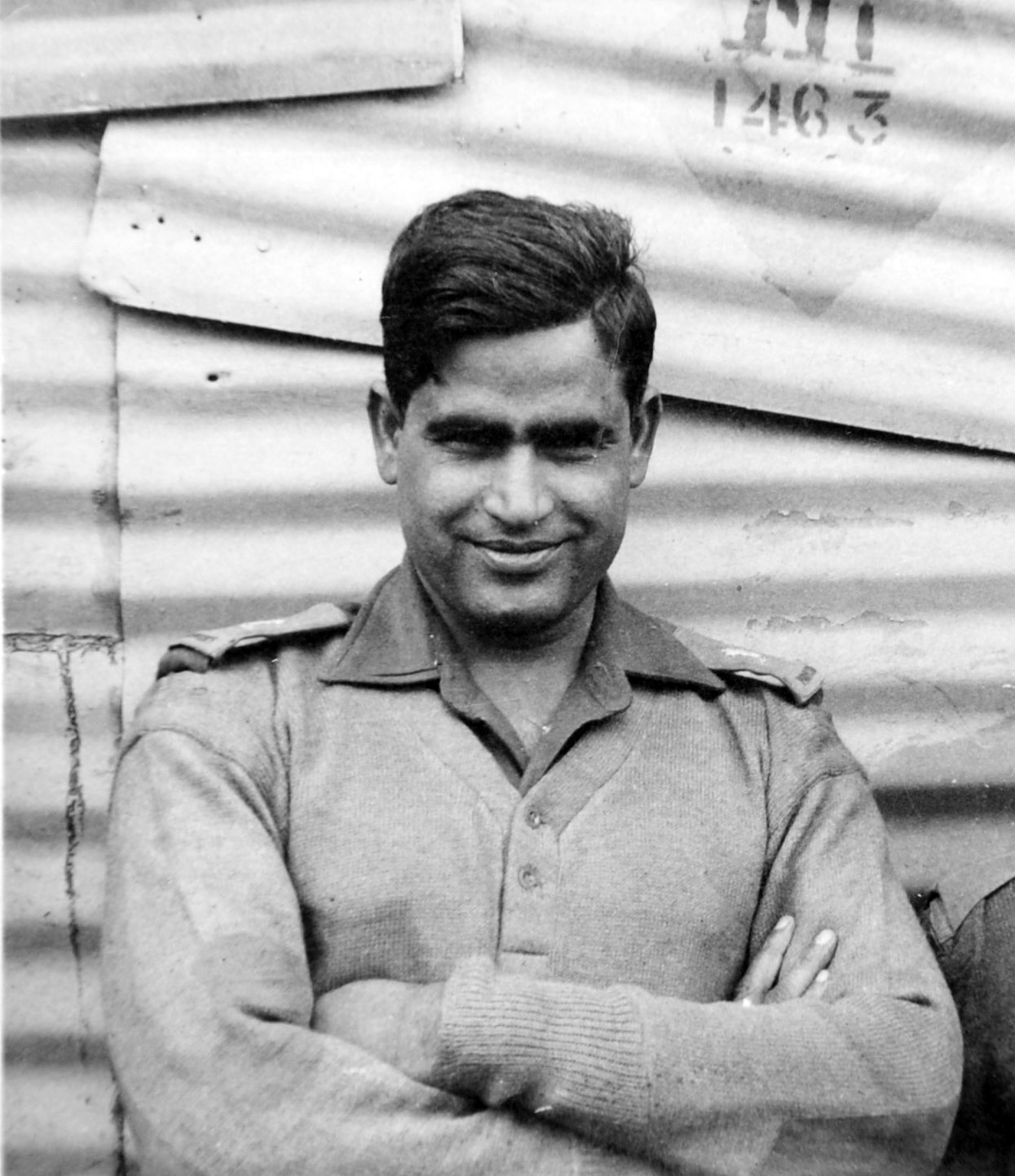
Bainsla as Major, circa 1972

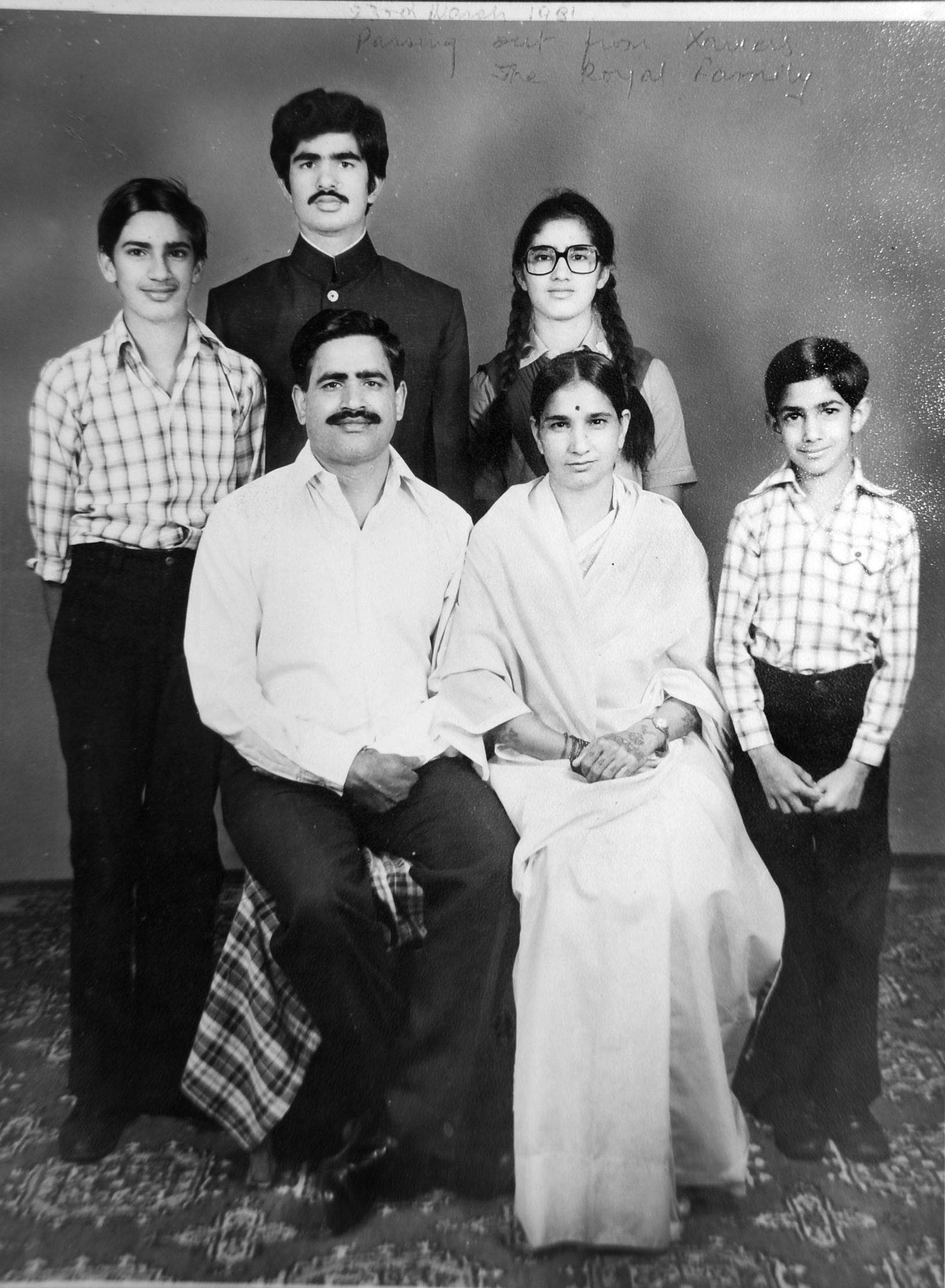
Bainsla family, circa 1981

Bainsla was a well read person with a passion for reading and collecting books. Even during the agitation movement, he could be seen reading a book by the train tracks.

== Gurjar Reservation Movement ==
=== Demand for Scheduled Tribe status ===
Most of our people are illiterate and living in abject poverty. We want better opportunities. For 12 years, I moved from pillar to post crying hoarse with the demands, but the government never listened. So we had to resort to direct action. As a backward class, we have to compete with 123 caste groups for 27 percent of government jobs. Our turn never comes. But as a tribe, we would fight only 15 other groups for about 7 percent of jobs. So it is more beneficial to be called a tribe.

— Kirori Singh in an interview with the Washington Post explained why he demanded scheduled tribe status.

In Rajasthan, Gurjars are officially part of communities that fall under the Other backward castes (OBC) category. However, benefits are mostly availed by other well educated communities in the OBC category. Bainsla believed that Gurjars were eligible to be recognized as a Scheduled Tribe as per the prevalent criteria and that inclusion in the Scheduled Tribe category would provide educational and employment benefits to the Gurjar community. During the initial days he was marked as "mad man" by his own community for raising such a demand.

In 2007, he withdrew the demand for ST status for Gurjars after talks with the Rajasthan Government. However, some sections of the community felt betrayed and accused him of being an agent of the government. In 2008, he renewed the call for ST status, and a new wave of Gurjar protests have since captured the attention of the whole country and put Rajasthan on standstill. Some media outlets have accused other Gurjar leaders of hypocrisy for their alleged lavish lifestyles, but Bainsla largely avoided these accusations.

=== Devnarayan Scheme ===
Bainsla was the man behind and the creator of the Devnarayan Yojna - a government program for the upliftment of Banjara/Baldia/Labana, Gadia-Lohar/Gadalia, Gujjar/Gurjar, Raika/Rebari and Gadaria (Gaadri). The Devnarayan Yojna focuses on imparting education, builds and operates residential schools and colleges, imparts felicitation to meritorious girl students, gives fully funded education to girl students from the classes of 6th onwards- all expenses of education, lodging and boarding are taken up by the Devnarayan Board for these students. He was instrumental in ensuring the opening of Primary Health Centers across the state to ensure medical facilities to the economically backward people in the rural hinterlands of Rajasthan. The Devnarayan Yojna has an approved financial budget outlay of Rs 1000 Crores by the government, which is now being extended to Rs 1500 Crores to take into account additional education and health facilities for the MBC in Rajasthan.

Bainsla played an instrumental role in ensuring the opening of Primary Health Centers across the state to provide medical facilities to economically backward people in the rural hinterlands of Rajasthan. Some achievements of Bainsla's Devnarayan initiative that are directly impacting the community include scholarships, funding for education in residential schools, setting up schools and colleges, and the Scooty (mechanized two wheeler) award.

Based on information obtained from the Rajasthan state government, 787,194 and 356,305 students have availed themselves of the benefits of pre-metric and post-metric scholarships respectively. 14,359 students are studying under the Gurukul Yojna where education, lodging, and boarding are provided free of cost. Under the Scooty Yojna, girls who score over 75% in class 12 exams are awarded a Scooty, functioning as an incentive and a utility to pursue higher education. During the first year of the Scooty initiative (2011), 280 Scootys were awarded, 220 short of the allocation of 500 and the cut off merit percentage was reduced to 53%. In 2017, 1000 Scootys were awarded against 11,000 applications and the merit cut off was adjusted to over 80%. An additional 7,589 girl students were awarded consolation financial awards.

1. 47 Student hostels given in rural and semi-urban locations to aid needy children to get quality education.
2. 2 Colleges have been built and are operational (1) Girls College at Bayana (2) Boys College at Nandauti.
3. 26 + 10, 36 residential schools approved and under different stages of construction. These schools are operational under the RICE pattern where the students are admitted in class 6th and full education is provided until class 12th. Some operational schools are:
  1. Devnarayan Girls Residential School, Suvana ( bhilwara )
  2. Devnarayan Boys Residential School, Baleta ( alwar )
  3. Devnarayan Boys Residential School, Chandapura ( jalore )
  4. Devnarayan Girls Residential School, Hindoli ( bundi )
  5. Devnarayan Girls Residential School, Devlen (karauli )
  6. Devnarayan Girls Residential School, Yusufpura (tonk)
  7. Devnarayan Girls Residential School, Macchipura (sawai madhopur)
  8. Devnarayan Girls Residential School, Amarpur (dausa)
4. Dairy Plant at Khetri under construction, which will give additional means of livelihood to the community that is predominantly dependent on cattle and milk production.
5. Health: 192 Sub-Primary health centers made operational in these backward rural areas. 6 Mobile hospital units operational to bridge the gap between the sub primary and primary health center. 7 Primary health centers operational.

=== OBC Reservation issue in Rajasthan ===
The prevalent OBC reservation prescribes a creamy layer process, wherein the OBC certificate is a prerequisite for availing reservation benefits. Only the incumbents who do not fall into the Creamy Layer (annual income/assets /value above Rs 6 Lacs per annum) will be issued the OBC certificate basis with which they can apply for the benefits of OBC reservation.

The "creamy layer" categorization is currently meant only for the OBCs and is not applicable to the Scheduled Castes and Scheduled Tribes. The reasons cited for this parity is that the provisions for reservations for SC/ST are not for their economical benefits but for their social upliftment. Thus, SC/ST reservations are applicable irrespective of the financial status of the beneficiaries, which in other words means that even if the SC/ST is financially sound, they would get the benefits of reservation regardless.

In Rajasthan, 91 entries (by way of castes, their synonyms, sub-castes etc.) have been notified by the State Government in the State list of Other Backward Classes (OBCs) in Rajasthan. In Rajasthan, the total reservation of 49% included 21% for OBC, 16% for SC (Scheduled Castes), and 12% for ST (Scheduled Tribes). The demand is for logical bifurcation of the 21% based on the population percentage for each OBC caste as the majority of the existing 21% is being availed by the few strong and robust castes in Rajasthan, and the economically backward castes do not get the relevant benefits of OBC reservation. The Justice Rohini Commission has been empowered to look into the bifurcation of the OBC by the center under article 340 of the constitution.

Post Colonel Bainsla demise the mantle of Gurjar Arakshan Sangrash Samiti is now taken up by his son Vijay Singh Bainsla who now leads the Gurjar Arakshan Sangharsh Samiti and leads the Gujjar Community in Rajasthan.

=== 5% Reservation: February 2019 ===
We had a meeting with the minister. We have asked for a written assurance from the government that it will take necessary steps if the bill fails to stand on its feet. Congress had promised a five percent quota in the election manifesto and not a bill. Tomorrow, the government will provide us a draft document after which we will take further decision. Till then, dharna will continue.

In February 2019, the community again protested by blocking the Delhi-Mumbai Rail route at Malarna Dungar, Sawai Madhopur by demanding a 5% quota after Congress came to power in Rajasthan. During this agitation, the Government of Rajasthan passed the bill in the Rajasthan Legislative Assembly granting 5% reservation exclusively to Gurjar, Gadia Lohar, Banjara, Rebari, and Gadaria communities within the state. This 5% reservation is applicable to education and state government appointments.

== MBC - OBC Reservation in TSP ==
The MBC reservation is not being implemented in Tribal Sub Plan region of Rajasthan. There is a growing advocacy since January 2026 by Vijay Bainsla

== Politics ==
Kirori Singh Bainsla contested the 2009 Lok Sabha elections from the Tonk–Sawai Madhopur Lok Sabha constituency on the Bharatiya Janata Party ticket, securing a total of 375,255 votes, losing by 317 votes to Namo Narain Meena. His Son Vijay Singh Bainsla contested the 2023 Vidhan Sabha Elections from Devli Uniara seat from BJP.

== Social Work ==
=== Colonel Bainsla Foundation ===
Colonel Bainsla Foundation is a trust registered under the societies registration act in the year 2018 and founded by Colonel Kirodi Singh Bainsla and Vijay Singh Bainsla as the founding trustees.

== Death ==
Drone footage of Col Bainsla's funeral procession

Col Bainsla's funeral procession, Sikandra, Dausa

Bainsla died on 31 March 2022 due to a prolonged illness. He was 82 years old. He was taken to a private hospital where doctors declared him brought dead, family sources said. He was cremated with military honors at his home village Mundia on 1 April 2022, with large numbers in attendance.
