= Sukhbir Singh Jaunapuria =

Indian politician

Member of Parliament, Lok Sabha
- In office 16 May 2014 – 4 June 2024
- Preceded by: Namo Narain Meena
- Succeeded by: Harish Meena
- Constituency: Tonk-Sawai Madhopur

Personal details
- Born: 18 October 1957 (age 68) Delhi, India
- Party: Bharatiya Janata Party
- Spouse: Dayawati Jaunapuria
- Children: 3
- Education: Delhi University
- Website: Lok Sabha website

Sukhbir Singh Jaunapuria is an Indian politician and a businessman. He was a Member of the Parliament in the Lok Sabha from 2014 to 2024 and owns Gurugram-based real estate group. He began his political career as an independent member of the Haryana Legislative Assembly, representing the Sohna constituency from 2004 to 2009. In 2014, he joined the Bharatiya Janata Party (BJP) and contested the Lok Sabha elections from Tonk-Sawai Madhopur in Rajasthan, defeating former Indian cricket captain Mohammad Azharuddin. He retained his seat in the 2019 elections, defeating former cabinet minister Namo Narayan Meena.
