= Deoli-Uniara Assembly constituency =

Legislative Assembly constituency in Rajasthan State, India

Coordinates: 25.87°N 75.7°E

Deoli-Uniara
- Constituency No. 97 for the Rajasthan Legislative Assembly

Constituency details
- Country: India
- Region: North India
- State: Rajasthan
- District: Tonk
- Lok Sabha constituency: Tonk-Sawai Madhopur
- Established: 2008
- Total electors: 297,316
- Reservation: None

Member of Legislative Assembly
- 16th Rajasthan Legislative Assembly
- Incumbent Rajendra Gurjar
- Party: Bharatiya Janata Party
- Elected year: 2024

Deoli-Uniara Assembly constituency is one of the 200 constituencies of the Rajasthan Legislative Assembly, in India.

It is part of Tonk district and Tonk-Sawai Madhopur Lok Sabha constituency.

== Members of the Legislative Assembly ==
Year	Member	Party
2008	Ram Narayan Meena	Indian National Congress
2013	Rajendra Gurjar	Bharatiya Janata Party
2018	Harish Meena	Indian National Congress
2023	Harish Meena	Indian National Congress
2024^	Rajendra Gurjar	Bharatiya Janata Party

^By-Poll

== Election results ==
=== 2024 bypoll ===
Rajasthan Legislative Assembly by-election, 2024: Deoli-Uniara
Party	Candidate	Votes	%	±%
BJP	Rajendra Gurjar	100,599	50.70	▲11.88
Independent	Naresh Meena	59,478	29.98	New
INC	Kastoor Chand Meena	31,385	15.82	▼31.67
Majority		41,121	20.72	
Turnout		198402	N/A	
BJP gain from INC		Swing	BJP	

=== 2023 ===
Rajasthan Legislative Assembly election, 2023: Deoli-Uniara
Party	Candidate	Votes	%	±%
INC	Harish Chandra Meena	105,001	47.49	▼3.3
BJP	Vijay Bainsla	85,826	38.82	▼0.55
RLP	Vikram Singh Gurjar	19,773	8.94	
NOTA	None of the above	1,475	0.67	▼0.69
Majority		19,175	8.67	▼2.75
Turnout		221,109	74.37	▲3.34
INC hold		Swing		

=== 2018 ===
Rajasthan Legislative Assembly Election, 2018: Deoli-Uniara
Party	Candidate	Votes	%	±%
INC	Harish Chandra Meena	95,540	50.79	
BJP	Rajendra Gurjar	74,064	39.37	
Independent	Uday Lal Gurjar	8,876	4.72	
BSP	Om Prakash Bairwa	3,724	1.98	
NOTA	None of the above	2,566	1.36	
Majority		21,476	11.42	
Turnout		188,125	71.03	
INC gain from BJP		Swing		

=== 2013 ===
Rajasthan Legislative Assembly election, 2013: Deoli-Uniara
Party	Candidate	Votes	%	±%
BJP	Rajendra Gurjar	85,288	53.00	▲13.00
INC	Ram Narayan Meena	55,593	35.00	▼5.00
NPEP	Harakchand	15,495	10.00	New
Majority		29,635	18.00	
BJP gain from INC		Swing		

=== 2008 ===
Rajasthan Legislative Assembly election, 2008: Deoli-Uniara
Party	Candidate	Votes	%	±%
INC	Ram Narayan Meena	55,085	40.00	
BJP	Nathu Singh Gurjar	49,981	32.00	
Independent Candidate	Digvijay Singh	25,932	19.00	
Majority		11,104	8.00	
INC hold		Swing		

== See also ==
- List of constituencies of the Rajasthan Legislative Assembly
- Tonk district
