= Harish Meena =

Indian politician

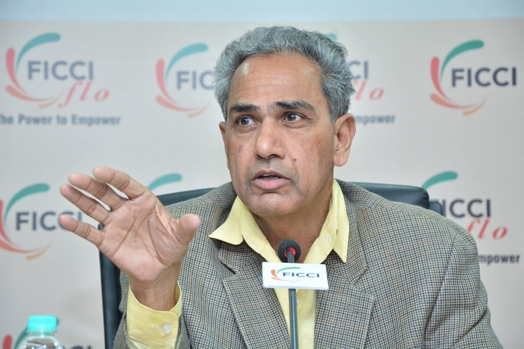
- Shri. Harish Meena speaking at a FICCI event.

Member of Parliament, Lok Sabha
- Incumbent
- Assumed office 4 June 2024
- Preceded by: Sukhbir Singh Jaunapuria
- Constituency: Tonk-Sawai Madhopur
- In office 16 May 2014 – 14 November 2018
- Preceded by: Kirodi Lal Meena
- Succeeded by: Jaskaur Meena
- Constituency: Dausa

Member of the Rajasthan Legislative Assembly
- In office 11 December 2018 – June 2024
- Preceded by: Rajendra Gurjar
- Succeeded by: Rajendra Gurjar
- Constituency: Deoli-Uniara

Secretary to the Government of India Special Protection Group
- In office 2013–2014

DGP, Rajasthan
- In office March 2009 – December 2013
- Preceded by: K.S. Bains
- Succeeded by: Omendra Bhardwaj

Personal details
- Born: 5 September 1954 (age 72) Bamanwas, Sawai Madhopur, Rajasthan
- Party: Indian National Congress (Since 14 November 2018)
- Spouse: Smt. Punit Meena
- Children: 2
- Education: Rajasthan University
- Occupation: IPS Officer (Retd.), Director General of Police (Retd.), Politician
- Website: harishmeena.com

Harish Chandra Meena (Hindi pronunciation: [ɦəɾiːʃ t͡ʃən̪d̪ɾə miːɳaː]) is an Indian politician and a retired Indian Police Service (IPS) officer of 1976 batch who is currently serving as Member of Parliament, 18th Lok Sabha from Tonk-Sawai Madhopur since 2024. He is member of the Indian National Congress. He was a Member of Parliament in the 16th Lok Sabha from Dausa. As an IPS officer he served as DGP of Rajasthan from March 2009 to December 2013 which is recorded to be IUI the longest tenure of a DGP in Rajasthan. He has also been awarded the 1996 Indian Police Medal and 2002 President Medal.

== Early life ==
Meena was born on 5 September 1954 in Bamanwas, Sawai Madhopur in Rajasthan to Narayan Meena and Narayani Devi. He completed Bachelor of Political Science Honors from Rajasthan University. He went to Jawaharlal Nehru University (New Delhi) for his Masters in Political Science. During his final year of Masters he got through Indian Police Service.

== Police career ==
=== Tenure ===
After becoming the IPS Officer in 1976, he was posted in Kharagpur, West Bengal Cadre for 3 years and then later he came to Rajasthan. Following are the details on his posting:

- 1981-1991 Superintendent of Police
- 1991-1997 Dy. Inspector General of Police
- 1997-2003 Inspector General of Police
- 2003-2007 Additional Director General of Police
- 2007-2013 Director General of Police
- 2013-2014 Secretary (Security), Cabinet Secretariat, Government of India

In 1996, he was awarded the Indian Police Medal and in 2002, he was awarded the President's Medal for his distinguished service.

== Initiatives and Reforms ==
Meena reformed the recruitment process of Police Constables in Rajasthan by making it more objective and transparent. In a bid to minimize corruption and biases, he completely removed written tests involving subjective answers, observation based physical examinations and personal interviews. Consequentially, Optical Mark Recognition (OMR) based written tests and objective physical examinations were introduced. The latter required each candidate to run 10 km in 60 minutes to qualify. To completely eradicate the scope of manipulation, a GPS chip was attached on the leg of the candidate. There was widespread criticism and skepticism towards this change. However to demonstrate the feasibility of the new physical tests, Mr. Meena himself started running in all recruitment centers. He completed the 10 km run within 48 minutes in Kota, 12 minutes ahead of the qualifying time. This recruitment pattern was also emulated by various states, Para Military and Armed Forces. As a break from the convention, police recruitment process during Harish Meena's tenure as DGP was never challenged in court.

Meena also focused on improving the track record of Rajasthan police in matters pertaining to human rights. He passed a standing order that stated that the whole police station would be liable to face a punishment posting if there was any death in the custody including suicide. A new post for Addl. Director General was created to overlook a cell that specially monitored crimes against the vulnerable sections of the society which included schedule tribes, schedule castes, women and children.

He also set up 3 independent institutions; Police University (Sardar Patel Police University 2012), Training Institute for Rajasthan Police Intelligence Branch and Commando Training Institute. Village Guard System was introduced in rural area. Police housing Scheme was accelerated and Police Housing Corporation was created. Police Commissionerate System was introduced for the first time in Rajasthan in Jaipur and Jodhpur. Separate wings of law-order and investigation were introduced. His last assignment was secretary (security) Cabinet Secretariat in Govt. of India.

== Political career ==
Meena entered politics and joined BJP in 2014. He served as Member of Parliament from Dausa. He left BJP and joined INC on 14 November 2018 weeks ahead of Rajasthan Assembly election on 7 December 2018. He was elected as Member of Parliament (MP) from Tonk-Sawai Madhopur Parliament Constituency in 18th Lok Sabha by defeating BJP Sukhbir Singh Jaunapuria.

== Tenure as a Parliamentarian ==
Till 16th Lok Sabha of his term, Harish Meena has participated in 65 debates and asked 224 questions in the parliament. He has spoken on diverse issues that include matters of social justice, judicial reforms, constituency development, education reforms etc.

Harish Meena has been involved in the following parliamentary committees during his 1st Lok Sabha tenure:

1. Member, Standing Committee on Transport, Tourism and Culture
2. Member, Consultative Committee on Skill Development
3. Member, Committee on Security in Parliament Complex
4. Member, Lok Sabha Fellowship Committee
5. Ex-Member, Consultative Committee, Ministry of Social Justice & Empowerment
6. Ex-Member, Standing Committee on Home Affairs

=== Key Issues Raised ===
Following are the issues strongly advocated by Mr Harish Meena:

Education: Harish Meena has raised many questions related to the improvement of education standards and amenities in the parliament. All his speeches in the constituency always include a mention of prioritizing education, most of his public events are held in government schools and he has initiated many development works aimed at strengthening the public education system in Dausa.

Judicial Reforms: On 10 May 2016, Harish Meena raised the issue of judicial reforms. He pressed upon the importance of bringing more transparency in judicial processes. He strongly advocates for having All India Judicial Services examinations for selecting judges to ensure that there is fairness and transparency in selection process.

Provision of Basic Amenities: Harish Meena has been proactively working towards ensuring that citizens get access to basic civic amenities. The most notable example being that on 02-Aug-2017 he brought to parliament's attention the state of Rajaurgarh Gram Panchayat which despite being a big panchayat and a popular tourist spot didn't have access to electricity. Through Rajasthan Renewable Energy Corporation's off-grid scheme he has initiated solar electrification of the village. He has consistently been raising the matter of drinking water accessibility for his constituency. He is keenly interested in improvement of healthcare and sanitation practices, and is closely associated with UNICEF for the same. In October 2015, he organized the "Rajasthan Local Legislators Meet in Jaipur on Sanitation and Nutrition" and in November 2017, participated in UNICEF's Planning Meeting of ODF Sustainability.

=== Initiative taken in the Constituency ===
He got a Pradhan Mantri Kaushal Kendra (PMKK ) opened in Dausa through the consultative committee on Skill Development. Only 31 PMKKs have opened in the country and Dausa is one of the few districts to have them. Also, the PMKK in Dausa is the only one in India that has opened at a Gram Panchayat level. Hence, it has a higher outreach in the rural areas.

He has initiated many infrastructure and civic amenity based projects. Key examples are construction of many over-bridges, stoppage of important trains in Bandikui railway junction, getting government of India to sanction a sandstone cluster with a Common Facility Centre between Dausa-Sikandra.

Harish Meena's key focus area is education. Under his tenure, he got 2 central schools sanctioned from Ministry of Human Resource Development in Dausa as it previously never had a central school. One Central School is functional in Dausa with 285 students and 14 staff members. Another central school has been sanctioned in Bandikui and will be functional in the academic session of 2018. More than 70% of Harish Meena's local area development fund is spent on education. He has also launched his own flagship program on girl child development. The program aims to holistically impact a girl child's education, health, and nutrition while sensitizing their families on their welfare. In the 1st phase of the program, he has selected 4 schools from 4 blocks respectively. Through these schools the impact will be on more than 1000 girls and their families.

== Personal life ==
Harish Meena married Smt. Punit Meena on 20 January 1981 and has 2 children, 1 son and 1 daughter. He is a travelling and adventure sports enthusiast. He has travelled to 18 countries and has led 2 mountaineering expeditions in Ladakh. During college days, he captained the Jawaharlal Nehru University team in the Inter-University Basketball Tournament and captained the Rajasthan College Team in Inter College Basket & Hockey Tournaments. Represented the Indian Table Tennis Team as a delegate in the Asian Championship and the World Table Tennis Championship.
