= Ram Sahay Varma =

Indian politician

Member of 16th Rajasthan Assembly
- Incumbent
- Assumed office 3 December 2023
- Preceded by: Prashant Bairwa
- Constituency: Niwai

Personal details
- Party: Bharatiya Janata Party
- Occupation: Politician

Ram Sahay Varma is an Indian politician currently serving as a member of the 16th Rajasthan Assembly, representing the Niwai Assembly constituency, as a member of the Bharatiya Janata Party.

== Political career ==
Following the 2023 Rajasthan Legislative Assembly election, he was elected as an MLA from the Niwai Assembly constituency. He defeated Indian national Congress (INC) candidate Prashant Bairwa with 12,941 votes.
