= Rajendra Gurjar =

Indian politician

Member of Rajasthan Legislative Assembly
- Incumbent
- Assumed office 23 November 2024
- Preceded by: Harish Chandra Meena
- Constituency: Deoli-Uniara

Personal details
- Party: Bharatiya Janata Party
- Profession: Politician

Rajendra Gurjar is an Indian politician from Rajasthan. He is a member of the Rajasthan Legislative Assembly since 2024, representing Deoli-Uniara Assembly constituency as a member of the Bharatiya Janata Party.He was MLA from AC Deoli-Uniara, District Tonk, Rajasthan during 2013-18.

== See also ==
- List of chief ministers of Rajasthan
- Rajasthan Legislative Assembly
