= Kunji Lal Meena =

Indian politician (1936–2019)

Member of Parliament, Lok Sabha
- In office 1991–1996
- Preceded by: Kirodi Lal Meena
- Succeeded by: Usha Meena
- Constituency: Sawai Madhopur

Personal details
- Born: 1936
- Died: 7 January 2019 (aged 82)
- Party: Bharatiya Janata Party
- Spouse: Soma Devi

Kunji Lal Meena (1936 – 7 January 2019) was an Indian politician. He was elected to the Lok Sabha from Sawai Madhopur in Rajasthan, as a member of the Bharatiya Janata Party. He was elected to Rajasthan Legislative Assembly four times.
