= Jitendra Kumar Gothwal =

Indian politician

Member of the Rajasthan Legislative Assembly
- Incumbent
- Assumed office 3 December 2023
- Preceded by: Ashok Bairwa
- In office 2013 - 2018
- Preceded by: Ashok Bairwa
- Succeeded by: Ashok Bairwa
- Constituency: Khandar

Personal details
- Born: 9 October 1973 (age 52) Chhoti Jhapda, Rajasthan
- Party: Bharatiya Janata Party
- Spouse: Sushma
- Children: 2

Jitendra Kumar Gothwal is an Indian politician and current Member of the Rajasthan Legislative Assembly from Khandar Sawai Madhopur in Rajasthan. He is a Bharatiya Janata Party politician.
