= Usha Meena =

Indian politician

Member of Parliament, Lok Sabha
- In office 1998–1999
- Constituency: Sawai Madhopur
- In office 1996–1998
- Preceded by: Kunji Lal Meena
- Constituency: Sawai Madhopur

Personal details
- Born: 1 July 1949
- Party: Indian National Congress
- Spouse: Dharam Singh Meena
- Parent: Chhuttan Lal Meena (father)
- Profession: Politician

Usha Meena (born 1 July 1949) is an Indian politician and a member of parliament elected from the Sawai Madhopur constituency in the Indian state of Rajasthan being an Indian National Congress candidate.

== Early life ==
She was born on 1 July 1949 in the Alwar, Rajasthan. She is the daughter of Late Captain Chhuttan Lal Meena (Ex-Member of Parliament, Congress). She married Dharam Singh Meena (IAS) and has two sons and a daughter.

== Career ==
Usha completed Bachelor of Arts from University of Rajasthan, Jaipur. She was first elected to the 11th Lok Sabha in 1996. Till 1997, she was

- Member, Committee on Industry
- Member, Consultative Committee, Ministry of Water Resources

In 1998, she was re-elected to the 12th Lok Sabha and served as

- Member, Committee on Agriculture
- Member, Consultative committee, Ministry of Water Resources

She has also been a member of Hindi Shiksha Samiti during 1998–99.
