= Kunji Lal =

Indian politician

Member of the Rajasthan Legislative Assembly
- In office 2013–2018
- Constituency: Bamanwas

Personal details
- Party: Bharatiya Janata Party
- Occupation: Politician

Kunji Lal is an Indian politician from the Bharatiya Janata Party and a member of the Rajasthan Legislative Assembly representing the Bamanwas Vidhan Sabha constituency of Rajasthan.
