= Sachin Pilot =

Indian politician (born 1977)

Captain Sachin Pilot
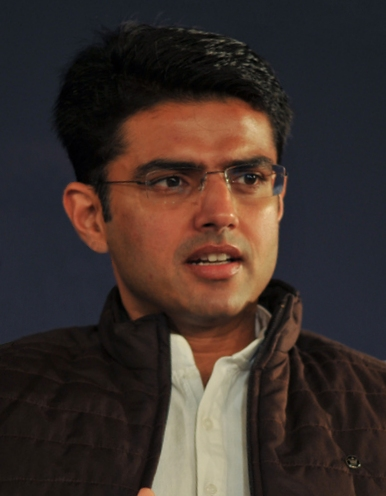
- Pilot in 2010

Member of Rajasthan Legislative Assembly
- Incumbent
- Assumed office 17 December 2018
- Preceded by: Ajit Singh Mehta
- Constituency: Tonk

General Secretary of Indian National Congress for Chhattisgarh
- Incumbent
- Assumed office 23 December 2023
- President: Mallikarjun Kharge
- Preceded by: Kumari Selja

4th Deputy Chief Minister of Rajasthan
- In office 17 December 2018 – 14 July 2020
- Governor: Kalyan Singh; Kalraj Mishra
- Chief Minister: Ashok Gehlot
- Ministry and Departments: Public Works Department; Rural Development & Panchayati Raj; Science & Technology; Statistic
- Succeeded by: Diya Kumari; Prem Chand Bairwa

President of Rajasthan Pradesh Congress Committee
- In office 13 January 2014 – 14 July 2020
- National President: Sonia Gandhi; Rahul Gandhi
- Preceded by: C. P. Joshi
- Succeeded by: Govind Singh Dotasra

Union Minister of State (Independent Charge) for Corporate Affairs
- In office 29 October 2012 – 24 May 2014
- Prime Minister: Manmohan Singh
- Preceded by: Veerappa Moily
- Succeeded by: Arun Jaitley

Union Minister of State for Communications and Information Technology
- In office 28 May 2009 – 28 October 2012
- Prime Minister: Manmohan Singh

Member of Parliament, Lok Sabha
- In office 16 May 2009 – 16 May 2014
- Preceded by: Rasa Singh Rawat
- Succeeded by: Sanwar Lal Jat
- Constituency: Ajmer, Rajasthan
- In office 17 May 2004 – 16 May 2009
- Preceded by: Rama Pilot
- Succeeded by: Kirodi Lal Meena
- Constituency: Dausa, Rajasthan

Personal details
- Born: Sachin Rajesh Pilot; 7 September 1977 (age 49) Saharanpur, Uttar Pradesh, India
- Party: Indian National Congress
- Spouse: Sara Abdullah (m. 2004; div. 2023)
- Children: 2 (Ahaan Pilot , Vehaan Pilot)
- Parent(s): Rajesh Pilot (father); Rama Pilot (mother)
- Education: Delhi University (B.A.); I.M.T. Ghaziabad (PGDM); Pennsylvania University (MBA)
- Profession: Indian Politician

Military service
- Allegiance: India
- Branch/service: Indian Army
- Years of service: 2011–present
- Rank: Captain
- Unit: Territorial Army

Captain Sachin Rajesh Pilot (born 7 September 1977) is an Indian politician. A member of the Indian National Congress, he has been serving as Member of Rajasthan Legislative Assembly from Tonk since 2018. He has previously served as Minister of State (Independent Charge) of Corporate Affairs and Communication and IT in the Government of India under Manmohan Singh. Additionally he served as the Deputy Chief Minister of Rajasthan from 2018 to 2020 under Ashok Gehlot. Pilot became the youngest citizen of India to become Member of Parliament at the age of 26.

Pilot was born to late Congress leader Rajesh Pilot and Rama Pilot. He was previously a member of the Indian Parliament for Ajmer in 2009 and Dausa constituencies of Rajasthan, becoming the youngest member of parliament when he was elected from the latter seat in 2004, aged 26. He was unseated from the Lok Sabha during the 2014 election from Ajmer constituency. He served as the Minister of Corporate Affairs in the UPA-2 government tenure from (2012 to 2014).

He studied at Air Force Bal Bharati School, New Delhi, and holds a B.A. from St. Stephens College, University of Delhi, a diploma in marketing from I.M.T. Ghaziabad and an MBA from the Wharton School of the University of Pennsylvania, Philadelphia, USA. He was employed with the Delhi Bureau of the British Broadcasting Corporation, and then with American multinational corporation General Motors for two years.

== Early life ==
Sachin Pilot was born on 7 September 1977 to the late Congress leader Rajesh Pilot (born Rajeshwar Prasad Bidhuri) and Rama Pilot. He belongs to the Bidhuri clan of the Gurjar community. His ancestral village is Vaidpura in Uttar Pradesh.

== Career ==
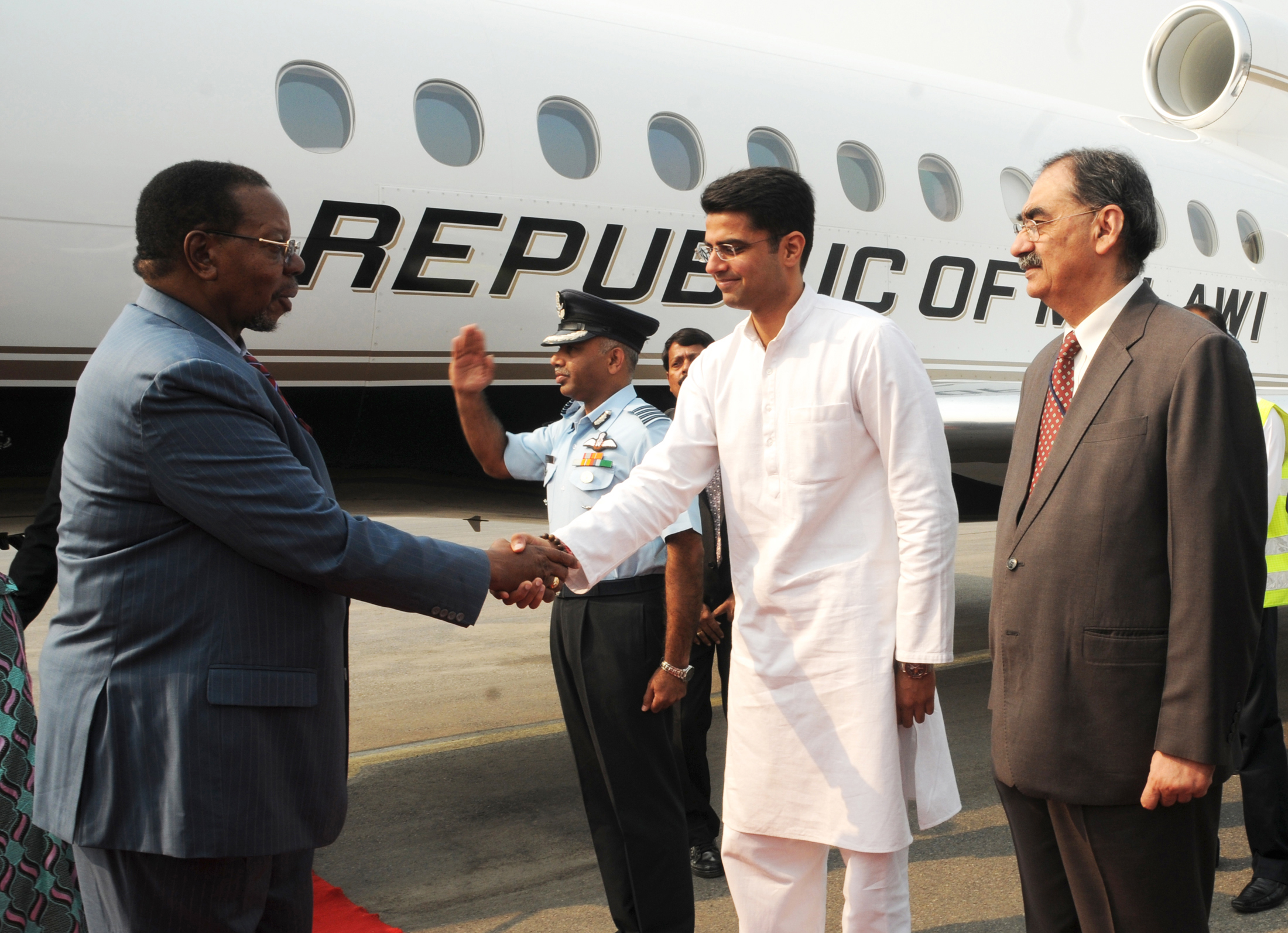
Pilot receives the President of Malawi Bingu wa Mutharika in New Delhi, c. 2010.

In the 2004 Lok Sabha elections, Pilot was elected from the Dausa constituency. At the age of 26, he became the youngest MP in India.

In the 2009 Lok Sabha elections, he defeated the Bharatiya Janata Party's Kiran Maheshwari by a margin of 76,596 votes and won the seat of Ajmer.

Pilot was a member of the Lok Sabha's Standing Committee on Home Affairs and member of the Consultative Committee in the Ministry of Civil Aviation. In 2012, he became the Minister of Corporate Affairs in the second Manmohan Singh ministry.

In the 2014 Lok Sabha elections, he was again nominated from the Ajmer constituency and was defeated by a margin of 1,71,983 votes by Bharatiya Janata Party's sitting MLA Sanwarlal Jat.

In 2014, he was appointed the President of the Rajasthan Pradesh Congress Committee.

== Deputy Chief Minister of Rajasthan ==
=== Early tenure ===
In the 2018 Legislative Assembly elections, Pilot won from the Tonk seat, after defeating Yunus Khan by a margin of 54,179 votes. It was speculated that Pilot, who was considered instrumental in the Congress's victory in the state, would be given the post of chief minister. On 17 December 2018, he was sworn in as Deputy chief Minister of Rajasthan under Ashok Gehlot.

=== 2020 political crisis ===
On 13 July 2020, Pilot's office issued a statement saying that the government of chief minister Ashok Gehlot was in a minority. An aide of Pilot's indicated that he would not be joining the Bharatiya Janata Party.

On 14 July 2020, the Indian National Congress sacked Pilot as the Deputy Chief Minister and Rajasthan Congress President for his revolt against the party and its leadership.

After his revolt there was speculation that he would join the BJP, like his former colleague Jyotiraditya Scindia, but on 15 July 2020 he rejected the rumours and stated: "I am still a member of the Congress party".

The Rajasthan Speaker, C.P. Joshi, issued notices to 19 dissident Congress MLAs including Pilot on 14 July 2020 after the Rajasthan Congress passed a resolution that they be disqualified from the state Assembly as they had defied a party whip to attend two Congress Legislature Party meetings. Pilot challenged this notice in the Rajasthan High Court on 17 July 2020. The High Court asked the Speaker to defer action on disqualification notices till 21 July 2020. The High Court ordered "status quo" to be maintained, essentially putting the disqualification procedure on hold, on 24 July 2020.

== Post 2020 ==
In 2023, before the 2024 Indian general elections Pilot was appointed the general secretary for the Chhattisgarh Congress. ahHe is now general secretary of Punjab since Sep 2026

== Electoral history ==
=== Lok Sabha ===
Year	Constituency	Party	Votes	%	Opponent	Partry	Votes	%	Margin	Margin in %	Result
2004	Dausa	INC	369,935	52%	Kartar Singh Bhadana	BJP	255,070	35.58%	114,865	16.02%	Won
2009	Ajmer	INC	4,05,575	52.59%	Kiran Maheshwari	BJP	3,29,440	42.72%	76,135	9.87%	Won
2014	Ajmer	INC	4,65,891	40.29%	Sanwar Lal Jat	BJP	6,37,874	55.16%	1,71,983	14.87%	Lost

=== Rajasthan Legislative Assembly ===
Year	Constituency	Party	Votes	%	Opponent	Party	Votes	%	Margin	Margin in %	Result
2018	Tonk	INC	109,040	63.56	Yunus Khan	BJP	54,861	31.98%	54,179	31.58%	Won
2023	Tonk	INC	105,812	56.12%	Ajit Singh Mehta	BJP	76,337	40.48%	29,475	15.64%	Won

== Personal life ==
Pilot married Sara Abdullah on 15 January 2004. She is the daughter of Farooq Abdullah, president of Jammu & Kashmir National Conference and ex-Chief Minister of Jammu and Kashmir. Together they have two sons. Later Sachin Pilot and Sara Abdullah have separated after nearly two decades of marriage, according to his poll affidavit for Rajasthan Assembly Election 2023.

His father, Rajesh Pilot, was also member of parliament and was also union minister. The 2023 Rajasthan Legislative Assembly election nomination paper filed by Pilot revealed that he is divorced from his wife.

== Army service ==
On 6 September 2012, Pilot became the first Union minister of India to be commissioned as an officer in the Territorial Army, fulfilling his desire to follow his father's footsteps to be in the armed forces. He is known as Captain Pilot for being an officer in the Territorial Army. After being commissioned he said, "This has been my desire to join the army for very long as I wanted to have my links with the armed forces, like my father and grandfather. I am honoured to be part of this family."

== Books published ==
- Rajesh Pilot: In Spirit Forever, co-authored with sister Sarika Pilot.

Government offices
Preceded by Veerappa Moily	Minister of Corporate Affairs; Minister of State (Independent charge); 29 October 2012 to 26 May 2014	Succeeded by Arun Jaitley
Preceded by Veerappa Moily	Ministry of Communications and Information Technology; Minister of State; 28 May 2009 to 28 October 2012	Succeeded by
Lok Sabha
Preceded by Rasa Singh Rawat	Member of Parliament for Ajmer; 16 May 2009 to 16 May 2014	Succeeded by Sanwar Lal Jat
Preceded by Rama Pilot	Member of Parliament for Dausa; 17 May 2004 to 16 May 2009	Succeeded by Kirodi Lal Meena
