= Political families of India =

List of prominent Indian political dynasties

Although India is a parliamentary democracy, the country's politics has become dynastic with high level of nepotism, possibly due to the absence of party organizations, independent civil-society associations which mobilize support for a party, or centralized financing of elections. The dynastic phenomenon is present at the national, state, regional, and district level. The Nehru–Gandhi family has produced three Indian prime ministers, and family members have largely led the Congress party since 1978. In addition to the major national parties, other national and regional parties are all dominated by families, mostly those of the party founders. The parties include Dravida Munnetra Kazhagam (DMK), Shiromani Akali Dal, Shiv Sena, Samajwadi Party, Rashtriya Janata Dal, Janata Dal Secular, Jharkhand Mukti Morcha, Kerala Congress, Jammu & Kashmir National Conference, Indian Union Muslim League, AIMIM, and the Nationalist Congress Party

== National ==
=== Nehru–Gandhi family ===
Chart illustrating the Nehru-Gandhi Family Tree

The Nehru–Gandhi family's involvement with the Congress Party began with Motilal Nehru in the 1920s, when India was still part of the British Empire. The family became more influential under his son, Jawaharlal Nehru, who became a prominent figure in India's nationalist movement. After Jawaharlal's death, his daughter Indira Gandhi became his political heir, whose surname comes from her husband, Feroze Gandhi. The Nehru-Gandhi dynasty has dominated the Congress Party since Indian independence in 1947. The party was defeated in the 2014 elections, however, and high-level defections took place in Maharashtra, Assam, West Bengal, and Jammu and Kashmir. The family still has widespread name recognition.

- Motilal Nehru - Freedom fighter, politician and lawyer
  - Jawaharlal Nehru - Freedom fighter, first Indian Prime Minister, 1947–1964 (son of Motilal)
  - Vijaya Lakshmi Pandit - Member of Parliament, diplomat (daughter of Motilal)
  - Kamala Nehru - Congress party leader (wife of Jawaharlal)
    - Indira Gandhi - Prime minister, 1966–1977 and 1980–1984 (daughter of Jawaharlal)
    - Feroze Gandhi - Freedom fighter, politician, journalist (husband of Indira)
      - Rajiv Gandhi - Prime minister, 1984–1989 (son of Feroze and Indira)
      - Sonia Gandhi - Former President of the Congress party, leading it to victory in two successive Lok Sabha elections (wife of Rajiv)
        - Rahul Gandhi - Member of Parliament, leader of opposition, former Congress Party president (son of Rajiv and Sonia)
        - Priyanka Gandhi - Member of parliament, Congress party general secretary (daughter of Rajiv and Sonia)
        - Robert Vadra - Businessman, entrepreneur (husband of Priyanka)
      - Sanjay Gandhi - Politician (son of Feroze and Indira)
      - Maneka Gandhi - Cabinet member of Narendra Modi's government (wife of Sanjay Gandhi)
        - Varun Gandhi - Former Member of Parliament (son of Sanjay)
      - Uma Nehru - Member of Parliament (aunt of Indira)
        - Arun Nehru - Former minister (nephew of Indira, grandson of Uma)

== Andhra Pradesh & Telangana ==
=== Kalvakuntla Family ===
- Kalvakuntla Chandrashekar Rao, former chief minister of Telangana
  - Kalvakuntla Taraka Rama Rao, former cabinet minister of Telangana (son of Chandrashekhar Rao)
  - Kalvakuntla Kavitha, former MP from Nizamabad and MLC in Telangana (daughter of Chandrashekhar Rao)
- Thaneeru Harish Rao former cabinet minister of Telangana (nephew of Chandrashekhar Rao)
- Joginapally Santosh Kumar, Rajya Sabha member (nephew of Chandrashekhar Rao)

=== Nandamuri-Nara-Daggubatti Family ===
- Nandamuri Taraka Rama Rao, former Chief Minister of Andhra Pradesh
  - Nandamuri Harikrishna, former Rajya Sabha Member and State Minister (son of Rama Rao)
    - Nandamuri Suhasini, vice president of Telugu Desam Party (daughter of Harikrishna)
  - Nandamuri Balakrishna, MLA from Hindupur (son of Rama Rao)
  - Daggubati Purandeswari, President of Andhra Pradesh BJP, former MP, former Union Minister of State, Human Resource Development, former Union Minister of State, Commerce and Industry (daughter of Rama Rao)
- Daggubati Venkateswara Rao, former Member of Andhra Pradesh State Assembly, former Member of Parliament, former Health Minister (son-in-law of Rama Rao)
- Nara Chandrababu Naidu, Chief Minister Andhra Pradesh and incumbent president of Telugu Desam Party (son-in-law of Rama Rao)
  - Nara Lokesh, General-Secretary of Telugu Desam Party, MLA from Mangalagiri & Cabinet Minister for Panchayat Raj & IT, Andhra Pradesh (son of Chandrababu)
- Nara Ramamurthy Naidu, former MLA from Chandragiri (brother of Chandrababu)
  - Nara Rohit (son of Nara Ramamurthy Naidu)

=== Yeduguri Sandinti Family ===
- Yeduguri Sandinti Rajasekhara Reddy, former Chief Minister of Andhra Pradesh
- Yeduguri Sandinti Vijayamma, President of YSRCP, Former MLA from Pulivendula, (wife of Rajashekara Reddy)
- Yeduguri Sandinti Jagan Mohan Reddy, Chief Minister of Andhra Pradesh, MP from Kadapa and president of YSR Congress Party(son of Rajashekara Reddy)
- Yeduguri Sandinti Vivekananda Reddy, MP from Kadapa, MLA, MLC & State Minister (brother of Rajashekara Reddy)
- Yeduguri Sandinti Avinash Reddy, MP from Kadapa (cousin brother of Jagan Mohan Reddy)
- Yerram Venkata Subba Reddy, Former MP from Ongole (uncle of Jagan Mohan Reddy)
- Pochimareddy Ravindranath Reddy, MLA from Kamalapuram (maternal uncle of Jagan Mohan Reddy)

== Assam ==
=== Gogoi Family ===
- Tarun Gogoi— Former Chief Minister of Assam (2001–2016), Member of Parliament, Lok Sabha from Assam (1971–1984, 1991–1996, 1998–2001), Member of Legislative Assembly in Assam (1996–1998, 2001–2020)
  - Gaurav Gogoi— Member of Lok Sabha from Assam (2014–present), Deputy Leader of Congress in Lok Sabha (2020–present)
- Dip Gogoi— MLA in Assam (2001-2001), Lok Sabha Member (2002–2014)

== Bihar ==
=== Mehta Family ===
- Tulsidas Mehta— five time Member of Bihar Legislative Assembly from Jandaha Assembly constituency, former Minister in Lalu Prasad Yadav cabinet, one of the founder of Rashtriya Janata Dal.
  - Alok Kumar Mehta— multiple times Member of Bihar Legislative Assembly, former Member of Lok Sabha from Ujiarpur Lok Sabha constituency, multiple times minister in Rashtriya Janata Dal government. (son of Tulsidas Mehta)

=== Chaudhary Family ===
- Shakuni Choudhary— five time Member of Bihar Legislative Assembly from Tarapur Assembly constituency and former Minister in Government of Bihar, a close accomplice of Lalu Prasad Yadav.
  - Samrat Choudhary— Chief minister of Bihar, Former Minister in Government of Bihar, President of Bihar wing of Bharatiya Janata Party (son of Shakuni Chaudhary)

=== Prasad Family ===
- Jagdeo Prasad— Founder of Shoshit Samaj Party and Former Deputy Chief Minister of Bihar.
- Satish Prasad Singh— Former Chief Minister of Bihar for shortest tenure. (brother-in-law of Jagdeo Prasad)
  - Nagmani— Former Minister for Social Justice and Empowerment in Atal Bihari Vajpayee's cabinet, several time Member of Bihar Legislative Assembly and Minister in Government of Bihar. (son of Jagdeo Prasad and son-in-law of Satish Prasad Singh).

=== Verma Family ===
- Upendra Nath Verma— Former Minister in Vishwanath Pratap Singh's cabinet, several time Member of Bihar Legislative Assembly, Former Minister For Education in Government of Bihar.
  - Bagi Kumar Verma— Former Minister in Government of Bihar, several time Member of Bihar Legislative Assembly. (son of Upendra Nath Verma)

=== Kushwaha Family ===
- Janardan Manjhi— several times Member of Bihar Legislative Assembly from Amarpur Assembly constituency in Banka district.
  - Jayant Raj Kushwaha— Member of Bihar Legislative Assembly from Amarpur Assembly constituency, served as Minister for Rural Works and Minister for Minor Water Resources in Government of Bihar. (son of Janardan Manjhi)

=== Yadav family ===
- Lalu Prasad Yadav – Former Chief Minister of Bihar and former Railway Minister of India
- Rabri Devi — Former Chief Minister of Bihar (wife of Lalu Prasad Yadav)
  - Tejashwi Yadav — Deputy CM of Bihar and former leader of the opposition (son of Lalu Prasad Yadav & Rabri Devi)
  - Tej Pratap Yadav — Former Minister of Health and Environment, Government of Bihar (son of Lalu Prasad Yadav & Rabri Devi)
  - Misa Bharti — Member of Parliament, Rajya Sabha (daughter of Lalu Prasad Yadav & Rabri Devi)

=== Mishra family ===
- Lalit Narayan Mishra – Former Railway Minister of India
  - Vijay Kumar Mishra – Former MLA from Jale and former MP, Lok Sabha from Darbhanga (son of Lalit Narayan Mishra)
    - Rishi Mishra – Former MLA from Jale (son of Vijay Kumar Mishra)
- Jagannath Mishra – Former Chief Minister of Bihar and former Cabinet Minister, Government of India (younger brother of Lalit Narayan Mishra)
  - Nitish Mishra – Former Rural Development Minister, Government of Bihar (son of Jagannath Mishra) CURRENTLY MINISTER OF TOURISM AND INDUSTRY, GOVERNMENT OF BIHAR

=== Sinha family ===
- Sadhu Sharan Singh - Nationalist, congressman and father of Thakur Jugal Kishore Sinha
  - Thakur Jugal Kishore Sinha – Freedom fighter, member of the first Lok Sabha, known as the father of India's cooperative movement
  - Ram Dulari Sinha – Freedom fighter, member of the first Vidhan Sabha, former Union Minister and governor (wife)
    - Madhurendra Kumar Singh - Member All India Congress Committee, former Director Central Warehousing Corporation and Bihar State Cooperative Bank.
      - Mrigendra Kumar Singh - son of Dr. Madhurendra Kumar Singh. State Secretary of Bihar Pradesh Congress Committee, former President of Sheohar Loksabha Youth Congress.

== Chhattisgarh ==
=== Jogi family ===
- Ajit Jogi – Former Chief Minister of Chhattisgarh
- Renu Jogi – Former MLA from Kota, Chhattisgarh (wife of Ajit Jogi)
  - Amit Jogi – Former MLA from Marwahi, Chhattisgarh (son of Ajit Jogi & Renu Jogi)

=== Shukla family ===
- Shyama Charan Shukla – Former Chief Minister of Madhya Pradesh
  - Amitesh Shukla – Former Rural Development Minister, Government of Chhattisgarh (son of Shyama Charan Shukla)
- Vidya Charan Shukla – Former Cabinet Minister, Government of India (younger brother of Shyama Charan Shukla)

=== Kashyap family ===
- Baliram Kashyap – Former MP, Lok Sabha from Bastar
  - Dinesh Kashyap – Former MP, Lok Sabha from Bastar (son of Baliram Kashyap)

=== Singh (Raman) family ===
- Raman Singh – Former Chief Minister of Chhattisgarh
  - Abhishek Singh – Former MP, Lok Sabha from Rajnandgaon (son)

== Goa ==
=== Alemao family ===
- Churchill Alemao – Fourth Chief Minister of Goa, former MP from South Goa, former MLA from Benaulim and Navelim
- Joaquim Alemao – Former MLA from Benaulim and Cuncolim (brother)
  - Yuri Alemao – MLA from Cuncolim (son)

=== Bandodkar family ===
- Dayanand Bandodkar – First Chief Minister of Goa, former MLA from Mandrem and Marcaim
  - Shashikala Kakodkar – Second Chief Minister of Goa, former MLA from Ponda, Bicholim and Maem (daughter)

=== Dhavalikar family ===
- Sudin Dhavalikar – MLA from Marcaim
- Deepak Dhavalikar – Former MLA from Priol (brother)

=== D'Souza family ===
- Francis D'Souza – Former MLA from Mapusa
  - Joshua D'Souza – MLA from Mapusa (son)

=== Fernandes family ===
- Victoria Fernandes – Former MLA from St. Cruz
  - Rodolfo Fernandes – MLA from St. Cruz (son)

=== Gauns family ===
- Gurudas Gauns – Former MLA from Pale
- Pratap Gauns – Former MLA from Pale (brother)

=== Lobo family ===
- Michael Lobo – MLA from Calangute
- Delilah Lobo – MLA from Siolim (wife)

=== Monserrate family ===
- Atanasio Monserrate – MLA from Panaji, former MLA from Taleigao and St. Cruz
- Jennifer Monserrate – MLA from Taleigao (wife)

=== Rane family ===
- Pratapsingh Rane – Third Chief Minister of Goa, former MLA from Sattari and Poriem
  - Vishwajit Pratapsingh Rane – MLA from Valpoi (son)
  - Deviya Vishwajit Rane – MLA from Poriem (wife)

=== Saldanha family ===
- José Matanhy de Saldanha – Former MLA from Cortalim
- Alina Saldanha – Former MLA from Cortalim (wife)

=== Sequeira family ===
- Jack de Sequeira – First opposition leader from Goa, former MLA from Panaji and St. Cruz
  - Erasmo de Sequeira – Former MP from South Goa (son)

=== Shet family ===
- Anant Shet – Former MLA from Maem
- Premendra Shet – MLA from Maem (brother)

=== Vaz family ===
- John Manuel Vaz – Former MLA from Mormugao
  - Giovanni Karl Vaz – Former MLA from Mormugao (son)

=== Zantye family ===
- Harish Narayan Prabhu Zantye – Former MP from North Goa, former MLA from Bicholim and Maem
  - Pravin Zantye – Former MLA from Maem (son)

== Gujarat ==
=== Patel family ===
- Chimanbhai Patel Family
  - Chimanbhai Patel, Former Chief Minister of Gujarat.
    - Siddharth Patel, Former Member of Legislative Assembly, Former President of Gujarat Pradesh Congress Committee.
- Keshubhai Patel Family
  - Keshubhai Patel, Former Chief Minister of Gujarat.
    - Bharat Patel, BJP member.

== Haryana ==
The Lal Trio denotes the influential trio of politicians originating from the Indian state of Haryana. Consisting of Devi Lal, Bansi Lal, and Bhajan Lal, these figures emerged as central pillars in Haryana's political landscape, shaping its governance and policies over several decades. Their collective influence not only garnered widespread recognition but also catalyzed the establishment of enduring political legacies under their surname. Integral to their political narrative is the phenomenon of "Aaya Ram Gaya Ram" politics, a term originating from an infamous incident in Haryana's political history. This phrase encapsulates the practice of legislators frequently switching political allegiances, often in pursuit of personal gain or ideological convenience. The Lal Trio, adept practitioners of this craft, leveraged it to their advantage, further consolidating their hold on power and influence within the region. Other than the Lal Trio, only other family which emerged as the most dominant and influential family is the Hooda Family. Bhupinder Singh Hooda has served as Chief Minister of the State for two simultaneous terms and is a mass leader dominating state as well as national politics. His son Deepender Singh Hooda emerged as the youth icon of Indian National Congress and is carrying forward his family legacy.

=== Dalbir-Selja Clan ===
This clan is prominent in the politics of Sirsa and Ambala.

- Dalbir Singh, was an MLA, MP and union minister belonging to INC. He died in the year 1987 aged 61 years of age.
- Selja Kumari, is the daughter of Dalbir Singh, former MP and union minister from INC.

=== Hooda Family ===
- Chaudhary Ranbir Singh (1914–2009) - Freedom Fighter, Member of the Constituent Assembly, Former MP Lok Sabha and Rajya Sabha and Former Minister in Punjab Government.
  - Ch. Bhupinder Singh Hooda - Former Chief Minister of Haryana and 4 time MP and 5 time MLA. (Son)
    - Deepender Singh Hooda - 4 time Lok Sabha MP from Rohtak and one time Rajya Sabha. (Son of Bhupinder Singh Hooda)

=== Chaudhary Devi Lal family ===
- Chaudhary Devi Lal (1915–2001) – Deputy Prime Minister of India (1989–91), Chief Minister of Haryana (1977–79 and 1987–1989)
- Sahib Ram Sihag - MLA 1937 & 1946
  - Ranjit Singh Chautala (son)– Former MLA and Minister of Haryana & Rajya Sabha MP
  - Om Prakash Chautala (son)– Former Chief Minister of Haryana (son)
  - Pratap Chautala (son)– Former MLA
  - Mohinder Singh Lather (son-in-law of Sahib Ram) - Lok Sabha & Rajya Sabha MP
    - Abhay Singh Chautala (son of OP Chautala)– MLA in Haryana, LoP, President Indian Olympic Association
    - Ajay Singh Chautala-(son of OP Chautala) MLA from Haryana & Rajasthan, Lok Sabha & Rajya Sabha MP
    - Naina Singh Chautala (wife of Ajay) – MLA in Haryana
    - Amit Sihag - MLA Dabwali
    - Aditya Chautala - MLA Dabwali
      - Dushyant Chautala (son of Ajay) – MLA, former Deputy Chief Minister, former Member of Parliament from Haryana
      - Arjun Singh Chautala - MLA in Haryana

=== Bansi Lal family ===
- Chaudhary Bansi Lal (1927–2006) – Defence Minister of India (1975–77), Railway Minister of India (1984–86), Chief Minister of Haryana (1996–99, 1986–97 and 1968–75)
  - Ch. Ranbir Singh Mahendra – Former MLA (son) & President BCCI
  - Ch. Surender Singh – MLA, Lok Sabha & Rajya Sabha MP, Twice Cabinet Minister Haryana
  - Kiran Choudhry (wife of Surender Singh) – MLA in Haryana & Delhi, Deputy Speaker Delhi, Rajya Sabha MP, Haryana Minister, CLP Haryana
  - Sombir Singh Sheoran – Former MLA (son-in-law)
    - Shruti Choudhry (daughter of Surender Singh) – MLA, Minister Haryana & Lok Sabha MP
  - Anuradha Chaudhary (Sister of Kiran) - In UP - MLA, Minister & Lok Sabha MP
- Manphool Chahar (Brother-in-law of Bansi Lal) - MLA, Minister & Speaker Haryana

=== Bhajan Lal family ===
- Bhajan Lal – Chief Minister of Haryana (1978–86 and 1991–96), Member of Parliament, Rajya Sabha (1986–92), Member of Parliament, Lok Sabha (1989–91, 1998–99 and 2009–11)
- Chander Mohan – former Deputy Chief Minister of Haryana (son)
- Dura Ram – MLA (nephew)
- Kuldeep Bishnoi – former two time MP (son)
  - Renuka Bishnoi – former MLA (wife of Kuldeep)
  - Bhavya Bishnoi – MLA (son of Kuldeep)

== Himachal Pradesh ==
=== Sukhu family ===
Shukuvinder Shuku & his wife Kamlesh Thakur

=== Singh (Virbhadra) family ===
- Virbhadra Singh (23 June 1934 – 8 July 2021), popularly known as Raja Saheb, was Chief Minister of Himachal Pradesh, member of the Himachal Pradesh Legislative Assembly, and a Union Minister in Manmohan Singh and Indira Gandhi's governments. He was a Lok Sabha member from Mandi and Shimla.
- Pratibha Singh (born 16 July 1956) – Congress Lok Sabha MP from Mandi (wife)
  - Vikramaditya Singh (born 17 October 1989) – Congress member of the Himachal Pradesh Legislative Assembly (son)

=== Dhumal family ===
- Prem Kumar Dhumal (born 10 April 1944) – Chief Minister of Himachal Pradesh (March 1998 – March 2003 and 1 January 2008 – 25 December 2012), former Lok Sabha member from Hamirpur
  - Anurag Singh Thakur (born 24 October 1974) – Lok Sabha member from Hamirpur, Minister of State for Finance and Corporate Affairs in Narendra Modi's government (son)

=== Sukh Ram family ===
- Sukh Ram (b. 27 July 1927) – Minister of Communications and Information Technology from 1993 to 1996 in the P. V. Narasimha Rao government, Lok Sabha member from Mandi and an MLA
  - Anil Sharma (b. 30 June 1956) – Congress MLA from Mandi in 1993, 2007 and 2012, and a Bharatiya Janata Party MLA in 2017; rejoined the Indian National Congress in 2019 (son)

== Jammu and Kashmir ==
=== Abdullah family ===
- Sheikh Abdullah – Former Chief Minister of Jammu and Kashmir
- Begum Akbar Jehan Abdullah – Former Member of Parliament, Lok Sabha (wife of Sheikh Abdullah)
  - Sheikh Mustafa Kamal – Former Member of the Jammu and Kashmir Legislative Assembly (son of Sheikh Abdullah & Begum Akbar Jehan Abdullah)
  - Farooq Abdullah – Former Chief Minister of Jammu and Kashmir (son of Sheikh Abdullah & Begum Akbar Jehan Abdullah)
    - Omar Abdullah – Current Chief Minister of Jammu and Kashmir and former Minister of State for External Affairs (son of Farooq Abdullah)
    - Sachin Pilot – Former Deputy Chief Minister of Rajasthan and former Member of Parliament and former Union Minister, Government of India (ex-son-in-law of Farooq Abdullah)

=== Sayeed family ===
- Mufti Mohammad Sayeed – Former Chief Minister of Jammu and Kashmir and former Minister of Home Affairs
  - Mehbooba Mufti – Former Chief Minister of Jammu and Kashmir (daughter of Mufti Mohammad Sayeed)
  - Tassaduq Hussain Mufti – Former member of Jammu and Kashmir Legislative Council (son of Mufti Mohammad Sayeed)

=== Lone family ===
- Abdul Ghani Lone – Former Cabinet Minister of Education and Health (J&K)
  - Sajjad Gani Lone – Former Minister in the J&K Cabinet

== Jharkhand ==
=== Soren family ===
- Shibu Soren – former Member of Parliament, Rajya Sabha and former Chief Minister of Jharkhand
  - Durga Soren – Former member of Jharkhand Legislative Assembly (son of Shibu Soren)
    - Sita Soren – Former member of Jharkhand Legislative Assembly (wife of Durga Soren)
  - Hemant Soren – Current Chief Minister of Jharkhand (son of Shibu Soren)
    - Kalpana Soren – Current member of Jharkhand Legislative Assembly (wife of Hemant Soren)
  - Basant Soren – Current member of Jharkhand Legislative Assembly (son of Shibu Soren)

=== Verma family ===
- Rati Lal Prasad Verma, six time Member of Indian Parliament (Lok Sabha) from Kodarma Lok Sabha constituency in Jharkhand.
- Jagdish Prasad Kushwaha, considered as founding leader of Bharatiya Jana Sangh in Jharkhand. (brother of Rati Lal Prasad Verma)
  - Jai Prakash Verma, Former Member of Jharkhand Legislative Assembly from Gandey Assembly constituency. (son of Jagdish Prasad Kushwaha and nephew of Rati Lal Prasad Verma)

== Karnataka ==
=== Devegowda family ===
- H. D. Devegowda - Former Prime Minister of India, only prime minister from Karnataka, Former Chief Minister of Karnataka and Current Member of Rajya Sabha
  - H. D. Kumaraswamy - MLA and former chief Minister of Karnataka.(Son of H. D. Devegowda)
    - Anitha Kumaraswamy - Member of Karnataka Legislative Assembly. (Wife of H. D. Kumaraswamy)
    - Nikhil Kumaraswamy (Indian actor and politician), Son of Kumarswamy
  - H. D. Revanna - MLA, former Minister of the Karnataka Public Works Department(Son of H. D. Devegowda)
    - Bhavani Revanna - Member of Zilla Panchayth Hassan. (Wife of H. D. Revanna)
    - Prajwal Revanna - Member of the 17th Lok Sabha from Hassan (son of H. D. Revanna)
    - Suraj Revanna - Member of Legislative Council from Hassan Constituency (Son of H. D. Revanna)

=== B. S. Yediyurappa ===
- B. S. Yediyurappa served as the 13th Chief Minister of Karnataka. He became the first CM for the BJP in a South Indian state
  - B. Y. Raghavendra(Son of B. S. Yediyurappa) is a member of the 16th Lok Sabha representing Shimoga district of Karnataka and was a member of 14th Karnataka Legislative Assembly. He previously represented Shikaripura Assembly constituency of Karnataka and is a member of the Bharatiya Janata Party (BJP).
  - B. Y. Vijayendra(Son of B. S. Yediyurappa) is currently the State President of Bharatiya Janata Party, Karnataka from 10 November 2023. He previously served as the General secretary and Vice President of the Karnataka unit of the Bharatiya Janata Yuva Morcha.

=== Mallikarjun Kharge ===
- Mallikarjun Kharge is serving as the President of the Indian National Congress since 2022, and Leader of the Opposition in Rajya Sabha since 2021. He has been a Member of Parliament, Rajya Sabha from Karnataka since 2020.
  - Priyank Kharge(Son of Mallikarjun Kharge) is serving as the Cabinet Minister in the Government of Karnataka. He is 3 time Member of Legislative Assembly (MLA) from Chittapur Constituency in Kalaburagi District of Karnataka.

=== Annasaheb Shankar Jolle ===
- Annasaheb Shankar Jolle is a BJP leader and the current Member of Parliament in the Lok Sabha from Chikkodi
  - Shashikala Annasaheb Jolle (wife of Annasaheb Shankar Jolle) served as a minister in the BJP government led by [B.S. Yediyurappa]. She is a three time Member of the Legislative Assembly for the Nippani Assembly constituency representing [Bharatiya Janata Party].

=== Umesh Jadhav ===
- Umesh Jadhav served as a BJP Member of Parliament in the 17th Lok Sabha from Kalaburagi Lok Sabha constituency.
  - Avinash Umesh Jadhav (son of Umesh Jadhav) is serving as Member of Parliament in the 18th Lok Sabha from Chincholi constituency.

=== L. A. Ravi Subramanya ===
- L. A. Ravi Subramanya s a member of the Karnataka Legislative Assembly from the Basavanagudi constituency in Bangalore district.
  - Tejasvi Surya (nephew of L. A. Ravi Subramanya) is serving as the Member of Parliament in the 17th Lok Sabha from the Bharatiya Janata Party, representing the Bangalore South constituency. He is also the president of the Bharatiya Janata Yuva Morcha since 26 September 2020.

== Madhya Pradesh ==
=== The Rewa Royal Family ===
- Maharaja Martand Singh Ju Deo Bahadur, former member of parliament from Rewa, former Rajpramukh of Vindhya Pradesh
  - Pushpraj Singh Son of Maharaja Martand Singh Ju Deo Bahadur and former minister of education of Madhya Pradesh state
    - Divyaraj Singh(Son of Pushparaj Singh), three time elected Member of the Madhya Pradesh Legislative Assembly, representing Sirmour Assembly constituency

=== Singh family (Churhat) ===
- Rao Shiv Bahadur Singh (1894–1955) from Churhat – Member of Jawaharlal Nehru's cabinet
  - Arjun Singh - Former Union Minister for Human Resources Department and former Chief Minister of Madhya Pradesh (son of Rao)
    - Ajay Arjun Singh – Former cabinet minister in the Madhya Pradesh government and former opposition leader (son of Arjun)

=== Chaudhary family ===
- Chaudhary Dilip Singh Chaturvedi – MLA from Bhind
  - Chaudhary Rakesh Singh Chaturvedi – Former cabinet minister, former leader of the opposition, MLA from Bhind (son)
  - Chaudhary Mukesh Singh Chaturvedi – MLA from Mehgaon (son)

=== Chaturvedi family ===
- Vidyawati Chaturvedi – MLA from Laundi
  - Satyavrat Chaturvedi – Member of the Rajya Sabha (son)

=== Nath family ===
- Kamal Nath – Former Chief Minister of Madhya Pradesh, former Minister of Urban Development, former member of the Lok Sabha from Chhindwara
- Alka Nath – Former Member of the Lok Sabha from Chhindwara (wife)
  - Nakul Nath – Former Member of the Lok Sabha from Chhindwara (son)

=== MP Singh family ===
- Balbhadra Singh – MLA from Raghogarh
  - Digvijaya Singh – 15th Chief Minister of Madhya Pradesh (son)
  - Lakshman Singh – MLA from Raghogarh (son)
  - Mool Singh – MLA from Raghogarh (nephew)
  - Jaivardhan Singh - Ex-Minister for Government of Madhya Pradesh, MLA from Raghogarh (Grandson)

=== Vajpayee family ===
- Atal Bihari Vajpayee – 10th Prime Minister of India
  - Karuna Shukla – Member of the 14th Lok Sabha (niece)

== Maharashtra ==
=== Ambedkar family ===
- B. R. Ambedkar (1891–1956) - Chairman of Drafting Committee of the Constitution of India, first Minister of Law and Justice, Member of Parliament, Rajya Sabha, labour member of the Viceroy's Executive Council, opposition leader in the Bombay Legislative Assembly, member of the Bombay Legislative Council
  - Yashwant Ambedkar (1912–1977) - Leader of the Republican Party of India, member of the Maharashtra Legislative Council (son of B. R. Ambedkar)
    - Prakash Ambedkar - Leader of the Vanchit Bahujan Aghadi, former Lok Sabha and Rajya Sabha MP (son of Yashwant)
    - Anandraj Ambedkar - Leader of the Republican Sena (son of Yashwant)

=== Thackeray family ===
- Bal Thackeray - Founder of the Shiv Sena political party
  - Uddhav Thackeray - Former Chief Minister of Maharashtra (son)
    - Aditya Thackeray - Former Cabinet minister in the Government of Maharashtra (grandson)

=== Pawar family ===
- Sharad Pawar – Former Defence Minister of India and Chief Minister of Maharashtra
  - Supriya Sule – Member of the Lok Sabha From Baramati (daughter)
  - Ajit Pawar – Former Deputy Chief Minister of Maharashtra, Former Leader of Opposition in the Maharashtra Legislative Assembly (nephew)
  - Rohit Rajendra Pawar - Member of Maharashtra assembly (nephew's son)

== Meghalaya ==
P. A. Sangma, Conrad Sangma, Agatha Sangma, James Sangma, Mehtab Sangma

== Mizoram ==
former cm Lal Thanhawla and his brother Lal Thanzara

== Nagaland ==
Shürhozelie Liezietsu former cm & his son Khriehu Liezietsu

== Odisha ==
=== Patnaik family ===
- Biju Patnaik - Former Chief Minister of Odisha (earlier known as Orissa)
  - Naveen Patnaik - Former Chief Minister of Odisha (son)

=== Biswal family ===
- Basant Kumar Biswal - Former Deputy Chief Minister of Odisha
  - Chiranjib Biswal - Former deputy opposition leader of the Odisha Legislative Assembly (son)

== Puducherry ==
=== Reddiar family ===
- V. Venkatasubha Reddiar – Former Chief Minister of Pondicherry and freedom fighter
  - V. Vaithilingam Reddiar – Former Chief Minister of Pondicherry (son)

=== Farook family ===
- M. O. H. Farook – Former Chief Minister of Pondicherry
  - M. O. H. F. Shahjahan – Former Education Minister of Pondicherry (son)

== Punjab ==
=== Former royal family of Patiala ===
- Mohinder Kaur, former member of Rajya Sabha and Lok Sabha
- Bhalindra Singh, former MLA from Patiala
- Capt. Amarinder Singh, former Chief Minister of Punjab
- Preneet Kaur, wife of Amarinder Singh; former minister of state in the External Affairs Ministry, former Member of Parliament
- Raninder Singh, son of Amarinder Singh and Preneet Kaur; contested Lok Sabha election from Bathinda in 2009 and Assembly election from Samana (Punjab) in 2012

=== Badal Family ===
- Parkash Singh Badal, former Chief Minister of Punjab
- Sukhbir Singh Badal, former Deputy Chief Minister of Punjab and President of the Shiromani Akali Dal
- Harsimrat Kaur Badal, wife of Sukhbir and current Member of Parliament from Bathinda
- Gurdas Singh Badal, Member of Parliament from Firozpur
- Manpreet Singh Badal, Finance minister Government of Punjab

=== Chabbewal Family ===
- Raj Kumar Chabbewal - Current Member of Parliament
- Ishank Kumar Chabbewal - Current member of the Punjab Legislative Assembly

=== Chaudhary Family ===
- Late Master Gurbanta Singh, former Agriculture Minister of Punjab. He was Parliamentary Secretary in the Ministry of Malik Khizar Hayat Tiwana, Premier of British Punjab.
- Late Chaudhary Jagjit Singh, former Cabinet Minister and MLA
- Chaudhary Surinder Singh, former MLA Kartarpur
- Late Santokh Singh Chaudhary Member of Parliament from Jalandhar and former Cabinet Minister of Punjab
- Vikramjit Singh Chaudhary, MLA Phillaur and former Chief of Punjab Youth Congress.

=== Chaudhary Sunder Singh family ===
- Late Chaudhary Sunder Singh - Former Member of Parliament
- Santosh Chowdhary - Former Member of Parliament

=== Kaypee Family ===
- Darshan Singh Kaypee - Former Minister and five times elected M.L.A
- Mohinder Singh Kaypee - Former Minister and Member of Parliament.

=== Khalsa Family ===
- Gopal Singh Khalsa - Elected M.L.A in 1937 for Punjab Provincial Assembly and was appointed as Parliamentary Secretary to the British Punjab's Premier Sikandar Hayat Khan. He was first Leader of the Opposition in the first Punjab Legislative Assembly after Independence of India in 1952. He was very close associate of Dr. Ambedkar.
- Harinder Singh Khalsa - Former Diplomat and former Member of Parliament.

=== Majithia Family ===
- Sundar Singh Majithia, landowner and politician. He was a member of Khalsa Nationalist Party and Revenue Member at the first and second legislative councils of the Punjab Legislative Assembly. The first president of the Shiromani Gurdwara Parbandhak Committee
- Wing Commander Sardar Surjit Singh Majithia, Indian politician, diplomat, and air force officer. Son of Sundar Singh Majithia
- Satyajit Singh Majithia, educationist, industrialist, philanthropist, and Chancellor of Khalsa University. Son of Sardar Surjit Singh Majithia, former Deputy Defence Minister
- Harsimrat Kaur Badal, a former Union Cabinet Minister of Food Processing Industries. Daughter of Satyajit Singh Majithia
- Bikram Singh Majithia, a former cabinet minister in the Punjab Government. Son of Satyajit Singh Majithia

=== Kairon Family ===
- Partap Singh Kairon (freedom fighter), (revolutionary), and former Chief Minister of Punjab
- Surinder Singh Kairon MP
- Adesh Partap Singh Kairon, grandson of Pratap Singh Kairon, former Cabinet minister Government of Punjab
- Gurinder Singh Kairon Congress leader

=== Khaira family ===
- Sukhjinder Singh Khaira, former education minister of Punjab and senior Akali Dal leader
- Sukhpal Singh Khaira, son of Sukhjinder Singh Khaira, former leader of opposition in Punjab and incumbent MLA

=== Mann Family ===
- Jathedar Arur Singh Naushera, Jathedar of the Akal Takht. Grandson of Budh Singh Mann
- Simranjit Singh Mann, multiple time Member of Parliament from Sangrur. Son of Joginder Singh Mann

=== Sarai Naga Family ===
- Late Harcharan Singh Brar, former Chief Minister of Punjab, former Minister of irrigation, power and health department, Governor of Orissa and Haryana, five-time MLA
- Gurbinder Kaur Brar, wife of Harcharan Singh Brar; former Leader of the opposition, former Member of Parliament, former Minister of State
- Adesh Kanwarjit Singh Brar, son of Harcharan Singh Brar; Vice president Punjab Pradesh Congress Committee, former MLA, former Youth Congress Chief of Punjab
- Karan Kaur Brar, daughter in law of Harcharan Singh Brar; former MLA

=== Talwandi family ===
- Jagdev Singh Talwandi, former President of Shiromani Akali Dal and Shiromani Gurdwara Parbandhak Committee; former Member of Parliament Lok Sabha from Ludhiana; former Member of Parliament Rajya Sabha; former Cabinet Minister Government of Punjab
- Ranjit Singh Talwandi, son of Jagdev Singh Talwandi; former MLA from Raikot constituency
- Dev Raj Singh Talwandi, brother of Jagdev Singh Talwandi, former MLA

=== Bajwa Family ===
- Late Satnam Singh Bajwa, former Minister in Government of Punjab
- Partap Singh Bajwa, son of Satnam Singh Bajwa; Member of Parliament from Gurdaspur Loksabha constituency and Rajya Sabha, former President of Punjab Pradesh Congress Committee
- Fatehjang Singh Bajwa, son of Satnam Singh Bajwa; MLA
- Charanjit Kaur Bajwa, wife of Partap Singh Bajwa; former MLA

== Rajasthan ==
Bohra family of rajakhera dholpur

1. Seth pratap singh bohra 2 time mla of rajakhera constituency
2. Pradhuman singh bohra Ex finance minister of raj.govt/ex home minister of raj .govt/ present 6th finance commission president/8time mla of rajakhera constituency।
3. Shri Rohit bohra 2 time continue mla of rajakhera

=== Former royal family of Alwar ===
- Mahendra Kumari, Member of Parliament from Alwar
- Bhanwar Jitendra Singh, former Member of Legislative Assembly from Alwar City constituency twice; former Secretary of AICC; former Member of Parliament from Alwar; former Minister of State for Home Affairs, former Minister of State for Youth Affairs and Sports (Independent charge) and former Minister of State for Defence; former AICC In-charge of Odisha, CWC Member and General Secretary AICC, and General Secretary In-charge of Madhya Pradesh.

=== Singh Family ===
- Dr. Digamber Singh, (1 October 1951 - 27 October 2017) Health, Medicine, Family Welfare and Ayurveda Minister of Rajasthan (2003 - 2008). Industries Minister of Rajasthan (2008 - 2009). Vice President of Rajasthan Bharatiya Janata Party (2013 - 2015). Chairman of the Twenty Point Program, Cabinet Minister (2015 - 2017). Additional Charge Ministries of Panchayati Raj, Social Justice, Law and Agriculture, Cabinet Minister (2016 - 2017). MLA, Deeg-Kumher (1993 - 2013).
- Asha Singh, (1 August 1955 - 30 August 2021), BJP leader.
- Dr. Shailesh Digamber Singh, (born 20 July 1980) MLA - Deeg-Kumher (2023–Present).

=== The Beniwal Family (Jats) ===
On 29 October 2018, Hanuman Beniwal founded the Rashtriya Loktantrik Party, becoming its national convenor in the process. This made Beniwal family as one of the most influential political families of Rajasthan since Rashtriya Loktantrik Party (RLP) is the only successful party in the state besides Indian National Congress and Bhartiya Janta Party.

- Ramdeo Beniwal, former two term Member of Rajasthan Legislative Assembly in 1977 and 1985 from Mundwa constituency.
- Hanuman Beniwal, Member of Lok Sabha from Nagaur, former two term Member of Rajasthan Legislative Assembly from Khinvsar, founder and National Convenor of the Rashtriya Loktantrik Party. He is son of Ramdeo Beniwal.
- Narayan Beniwal, Member of Rajasthan Legislative Assembly from Khinvsar, Nagaur, Rajasthan. He is son of Ramdeo Beniwal.
- Kamla Beniwal, former Deputy Chief Minister of Rajasthan in 2003, first women to become minister in Rajasthan at the age of 27 in 1954, former Governor of Tripura, Gujarat and Mizoram between 2009 and 2014.
- Alok Beniwal, Member of Rajasthan Legislative Assembly from Shahpura. He is son of Kamla Beniwal.

=== Bishnoi family ===
- Ram Singh Bishnoi - Former Cabinet Minister and 7 times member of Rajasthan Legislative Assembly
  - Malkhan Singh Bishnoi - Former member of Rajasthan Legislative Assembly (son of Ram Singh Bishnoi)
- Mahendra Bishnoi - MLA from Luni in Jodhpur district (son of Malkhan Singh Bishnoi)

=== Gehlot family ===
- Ashok Gehlot - ex Chief Minister of Rajasthan
  - Vaibhav Gehlot - chairman, Rajasthan Cricket Association (son of Ashok Gehlot)

=== Maderna family ===
- Parasram Maderna - Former cabinet minister Government of Rajasthan and former Speaker of Rajasthan Legislative Assembly
  - Mahipal Maderna - Former cabinet minister Government of Rajasthan (son of Parasram Maderna)
    - Divya Maderna - Member of Rajasthan Legislative Assembly (daughter of Mahipal Maderna)

=== Meena family ===
- Bharat Lal Meena, former cabinet minister in Rajasthan government. 4 time MLA from bamanwas constituency.
- Namo Narain Meena, former minister of state, former union minister of state from congress party
  - Harish Meena, former DGP of rajasthan and MP of Dausa constituency from Bjp party
    - Om Prakash Meena, chief secretary of Rajasthan

•Dr. Kirodi lal meena, 6 times MLA 3 Times MP Loksabha and Rajyasabha 2 times cabinet minister •Golma Devi Meena (wife of Kirodi lal meena, former Minister, 2 times MLA •Rajendra Meena Pradhan (Mahwa nephew), MLA •Jagmohan Meena RAS (brother of Kirodi lal meena), Bjp candidate from Dausa constituency

=== Mirdha family ===
- Baldev Ram Mirdha
  - Ram Niwas Mirdha - Former central cabinet minister (son of Baldev Ram Mirdha)
    - Harendra Mirdha - Former cabinet minister Government of Rajasthan
      - Raghuvendra Mirdha - Member Rajasthan Pradesh Congress Committee
  - Nathuram Mirdha - Former Member of the Rajasthan Legislative Assembly (nephew of Baldev Ram Mirdha)
    - Bhanu Prakash Mirdha - Former MP, Lok Sabha (son of Nathuram Mirdha)
      - Richpal Mirdha - Member of Legislative Assembly
        - Jyoti Mirdha - Member of Parliament

=== Pilot family ===
- Rajesh Pilot - Former Central cabinet minister
- Rama Pilot - Former Member of Parliament (wife)
  - Cap. Sachin Pilot - Member of the Rajasthan Legislative Assembly, Former Deputy Chief Minister and Former Union Minister in Government of India. (son of Rajesh Pilot and son-in-law of Farooq Abdullah)

=== Scindia family ===
- Vasundhara Raje Scindia - Former Chief Minister of Rajasthan
  - Dushyant Singh - MP, Lok Sabha (son of Vasundhara Raje)

=== Sharma family ===
- Banwari Lal Sharma - Former Cabinet Minister and 3 time MLA from Dholpur Assembly constituency
- Ashok Sharma Dholpur President of Congress
- Ritesh Sharma - Mayor of Dholpur
- Murari Lal Sharma - Nagar Palika Chairman of Dholpur

=== Verma family ===
- Manikya Lal Verma - First Prime Minister of Undivided Rajasthan, Former MP, Lok Sabha from Tonk and Chittorgarh
- Naraini Devi Verma - Former Member of Parliament (wife of Manikya Lal Verma)
  - Deen Bandhu Verma - Former Member of Parliament from Udaipur, Former Member of Legislative Assembly from Kapasan, Former Minister of State, Govt of Rajasthan (son of Manikya Lal Verma)

=== Vishnoi family ===
- Poonam Chand Vishnoi - Former Speaker of Rajasthan Legislative Assembly
  - Vijay Laxmi Bishnoi - Member of PCC (daughter of Poonam Chand Vishnoi)

== Sikkim ==
- PS Golay, his wife Krishna Kumari Rai & his son Aditya Tamang. * ex cm Nar Bahadur Bhandari & his wife ex lok sabha mp Dil Kumari Bhandari

== Tripura ==
=== Singh family ===
- Sachindra Lal Singh - Former chief minister of Tripura
  - Asish Lal Singh - State president of Trinamool Congress (son)

== Uttar Pradesh ==
=== Ansari Family ===
- Mukhtar Ahmed Ansari, former President of Indian National Congress (1927–1928) and former President of All India Muslim League (1920–1921).
  - Zohra Ansari, (1915–1988) was an Indian activist and freedom fighter. (Daughter of Mukhtar Ahmed Ansari)
- Subhanullah Ansari, Leader of Communist Party of India (CPI)
    - Afzal Ansari, Lok Sabha MP of Ghazipur (son of Subhanullah)
    - Sibgatullah Ansari, MLA of Mohammadabad (2007–2017) (son of Subhanullah)
      - Suhaib Ansari, MLA of Mohammadabad (2022–Present) (son of Sibgatullah)
    - Mukhtar Ansari, MLA of Mau (1996–2022) (son of Subhanullah)
      - Abbas Ansari, MLA of Mau (2022–Present) (son of Mukhtar Ansari)
  - Abdul Aziz Ansari (nephew of Mukhtar Ahmed Ansari)
    - Hamid Ansari, former Vice President of India (2007–2017) (grand-nephew of Mukhtar Ahmed Ansari) and (2nd cousin of Afzal, Sibgatullah and Mukhtar Ansari)
  - Faridul Haq Ansari, a lawyer and politician who actively participated in the Indian independence movement

=== Maurya family ===
- Swami Prasad Maurya; former minister in Government of Uttar Pradesh, former leader of opposition in Uttar Pradesh Legislative Assembly, National General Secretary of Samajwadi Party
  - Sanghmitra Maurya; Member of Indian Parliament (Lok Sabha) (daughter of Swami Prasad Maurya)

=== Chaudhary Family ===
- Chaudhary Charan Singh, ex-Prime Minister of India
  - Chaudhary Ajit Singh, founder of Rashtriya Lok Dal
    - Jayant Chaudhary, Member of Parliament Rajya Sabha

=== Yadav family ===
- Mulayam Singh Yadav – former Chief Minister of Uttar Pradesh, former Defence Minister of India
  - Akhilesh Yadav – Former chief minister of Uttar Pradesh and current Lok Sabha MP representing Kannauj (son of Mulayam)
  - Dimple Yadav – Lok Sabha MP representing Mainpuri (daughter-in-Law of Mulayam)
- Abhay Ram Yadav (brother)
  - Dharmendra Yadav – Former Lok Sabha MP (nephew of Mulayam)
- Shivpal Singh Yadav – Former Minister in the government of Uttar Pradesh (brother)
- Rajpal Singh Yadav (brother)
  - Abhishek Yadav alias Anshul Yadav - District Panchayat Chairman of Etawah (nephew of Mulayam)
- Ram Gopal Yadav – MP Rajya Sabha (cousin brother)
  - Akshay Yadav – Former Lok Sabha MP (son of Ram Gopal)

=== Khan family ===
- Azam Khan (born 1948), former Leader of the Opposition Uttar Pradesh Legislative Assembly; former Cabinet Minister in the Government of Uttar Pradesh; former MP Lok Sabha and Rajya Sabha; ten-term MLA Rampur constituency
- Tazeen Fatma, former Member of parliament, Rajya Sabha; former MLA Rampur constituency
  - Abdullah Azam Khan, twice elected MLA for the Suar Assembly constituency

=== Khan-Hussain family ===
- Dr. Zakir Husain Khan, (8 February 1897 – 3 May 1969) was an Indian educationist and politician who served as the 2nd Vice President of India from 1962 to 1967 and 3rd president of India from 13 May 1967 until his death on 3 May 1969.
- Mahmud Husain Khan, (5 July 1907 – 12 April 1975) was a Pakistani historian, educationist, and politician, known for his role in the Pakistan Movement, and for pioneering the study of social sciences.
- General Rahimuddin Khan, was a general of the Pakistan Army who served as the 4th Chairman Joint Chiefs of Staff Committee from 1984 to 1987
- Khurshed Alam Khan, former External Affairs Minister of India and former Governor of Karnataka and Goa. (son-in-law of Dr. Zakir Hussain).
  - Salman Khurshid, former External Affairs and Minority Affairs Minister of India and former MP from Farrukhabad (son of Khurshed Alam Khan).

== West Bengal ==
=== Subhas Chandra Bose family ===
- Subhas Chandra Bose – Indian nationalist
- Sharat Chandra Bose
  - Subrata Bose - Member of parliament (MP) from Barasat Lok Sabha constituency 2004-2009 (youngest son of Sarat Chandra Bose and nephew of Subhas Chandra Bose)
  - Sisir Kumar Bose - Indian freedom fighter, pediatrician and legislator (nephew of Subhas Chandra and husband of Krishna Bose)
  - Krishna Bose - MP from Jadavpur 1996-2004 (wife of Sisir Kumar Bose, Subhas Chandra Bose's nephew)
    - Sugata Bose - Lok Sabha MP from Jadavpur 2014-2019 (Sisir Kumar Bose and Krishna Bose's son)

=== Dasmunsi family ===
- Priya Ranjan Dasmunsi - Former cabinet minister in the government of India
- Deepa Dasmunsi - Former Minister of State for Urban Development in the government of India (wife)

=== Konar family ===
- Hare Krishna Konar, freedom fighter and politician, one of the founding members of the Communist Party of India (Marxist), and Minister of Land & Land Revenue
- Benoy Krishna Konar, peasant leader, member of the West Bengal Legislative Assembly, and president of All India Kisan Sabha
- Maharani Konar, communist leader, member of the West Bengal Legislative Assembly, and one of the founding leaders of the All India Federation of Anganwadi Workers and Helpers (wife of Benoy Krishna Konar)

=== Banerjee family ===
- Mamata Banerjee - Former Chief Minister of West Bengal
  - Abhishek Banerjee - MP from Diamond Harbour constituency (nephew)

=== Bandopadhyay family ===
- Sudip Bandyopadhyay - MP from the Kolkata Uttar constituency
- Nayna Bandopadhyay - MLA from Chourangi constituency, (wife of Sudip)

=== Ahmed family ===
- Sultan Ahmed - MP and former Union Minister of State for Tourism Department, government of India
- Sajda Ahmed - MP from the Uluberia constituency (wife)
- Iqbal Ahmed - MLA and former deputy mayor of Kolkata (brother)

=== Chatterjee family ===
- Nirmal Chandra Chatterjee - MP from Hoogly
- Somnath Chatterjee - Speaker of the Lok Sabha and MP from Bolpur (son)

=== Sengupta family ===
- Somnath Sengupta - Self speaker from Kolkata (son)
