= Political families of Rajasthan =

List of Indian political families based in Rajasthan

This is the alphabetical categorised list of statewide, regional and local political families involved in the politics and various elections of Rajasthan, at state (Rajasthan Legislative Assembly) and National level (Lok Sabha).

== Families ==
=== Beniwal Family ===
On 29 October 2018, Hanuman Beniwal founded the Rashtriya Loktantrik Party, becoming its national convenor in the process. This made Beniwal family as one of the most influential political families of Rajasthan since Rashtriya Loktantrik Party (RLP) is the only successful party in the state besides Indian National Congress and Bhartiya Janta Party.

- Ramdev Beniwal, former two term Member of Rajasthan Legislative Assembly in 1977 and 1985 from Mundwa constituency.
- Hanuman Beniwal, Member of Lok Sabha from Nagaur, three term Member of Rajasthan Legislative Assembly from Khinvsar, founder and National Convenor of the Rashtriya Loktantrik Party. He is son of Ramdev Beniwal.
- Narayan Beniwal, Member of Rajasthan Legislative Assembly from Khinvsar, Nagaur, Rajasthan. He is son of Ramdev Beniwal.
- Kamla Beniwal, former Deputy Chief Minister of Rajasthan in 2003, first women to became minister in Rajasthan at the age of 27 in 1954, former Governor of Tripura, Gujarat and Mizoram between 2009 and 2014.
- Alok Beniwal, Member of Rajasthan Legislative Assembly from Shahpura. He is son of Kamla Beniwal.

=== Singh Family ===
- Digamber Singh, former cabinet minister in Government of Rajasthan and MLA from Deeg Kumher.
- Shailesh Singh, son of Digamber Singh, member of the Rajasthan Legislative Assembly from Deeg Kumher.

=== Manikya Lal Verma Family ===
- Manikya Lal Verma, Freedom fighter and second Prime Minister of unified Rajasthan, Member of Loksabha from Tonk and Chittorgarh, former president, RPCC.
- Narayani Devi Verma (Wife), Former Member of Parliament, Founder of Mahila Ashram School in Bhilwara for upliftment of Tribal Children's.
- Deen Bandhu Verma (Son), Former Member of Parliament from Udaipur, Former Member of Legislative Assembly from Kapasan. Former Minister of State, Govt of Rajasthan. General Secretary, RPCC.

=== Jagan Family ===
- Banwari Lal Sharma, Former Cabinet Minister and 5 term MLA from Dholpur Constituency.
- Shilpi Sharma, Indian actress, model and DJ.

=== Pilot Family ===
- Rajesh Pilot, Indian politician, former minister in the Government of India and a former Indian Air Force officer.
- Rama Pilot, Wife of Rajesh Pilot, former Member of Parliament.
- Sachin Pilot, currently Member of the Legislative Assembly from Tonk. Former Deputy Chief Minister of Rajasthan, former Union Minister in Government of India. He is son of Rajesh Pilot.

=== Mirdha Family ===
- Baldev Ram Mirdha, founder of ‘Marwar Kisan Sabha’ and ‘Rajasthan Kisan Sabha’. He is popularly known as Kisan-Kesari.
- Ram Niwas Mirdha, son of Baldev Ram Mirdha, former member of Rajasthan Legislative Assembly and Lok Sabha, former cabinet minister in Government of India.
- Harendra Mirdha, former member of Rajasthan Legislative Assembly and cabinet minister in Government of Rajasthan.
- Raghuvendra Mirdha, Member of Rajasthan Pradesh Congress Committee.
- Nathuram Mirdha, popular freedom fighter, social reformer and farmer leader in Marwar region in Rajasthan.
- Bhanu Prakash Mirdha, former member of Lok Sabha, son of Nathuram Mirdha.
- Richpal Singh Mirdha, former member of Rajasthan Legislative Assembly.
- Jyoti Mirdha, former member of Lok Sabha from Nagaur.

=== Vishnoi family ===
- Poonam Chand Vishnoi, former speaker Rajasthan Legislative Assembly and cabinet minister in Government of Rajasthan.
- Vijay laxmi Bishnoi, Member of PCC, daughter of Poonam Chand Vishnoi.

=== Ram Singh Bishnoi Family ===
- Ram Singh Bishnoi, former Cabinet Minister and 7 times member of Rajasthan Legislative Assembly.
- Malkhan Singh Bishnoi, former member of Rajasthan Legislative Assembly, Son of Ram singh Bishnoi.
- Mahendra Bishnoi, Son of Malkhan Singh Bishnoi, Member of Rajasthan Legislative Assembly from Luni constituency in Jodhpur district.

=== Gehlot family ===
- Ashok Gehlot, former chief minister of Rajasthan, elected 5 times as Member of Parliament and 5 times as Member of Legislative Assembly.
- Vaibhav Gehlot, former chairman, Rajasthan Cricket Association & son of Ashok Gehlot.

=== Raje family ===
- Vasundhara Raje, former Chief minister of Rajasthan (two term as CM), former minister in the Union Cabinet of Atal Bihari Vajpayee.
- Dushyant Singh, member of Lok Sabha, son of Vasundhara Raje.

=== Maderna Family ===
- Parasram Maderna, former nine term Member of Rajasthan Legislative Assembly, former president of Rajasthan Pradesh Congress Committee.
- Mahipal Maderna, former Minister of water resources in Government of Rajasthan.
- Divya Maderna, former member of Rajasthan Legislative Assembly in 2018.

=== Meena Family ===
- Bharat Lal Meena, former cabinet minister in Government of Rajasthan.
- Namo Narain Meena, former Minister of State in the Minister of Environment and Forests, former member of Lok Sabha.
- Harish Meena, former DGP of Rajasthan, former member of Lok Sabha from Dausa
- Om Prakash Meena, former chief secretary of Rajasthan.

=== Kirodi Lal Meena Family ===
- Kirodi Lal Meena, cabinet minister in Government of Rajasthan and former member of the Lok Sabha.
- Golma Devi Meena, former minister in Government of Rajasthan and two term MLA.
- Rajendra Meena, MLA in Rajasthan Assembly

=== Ola Family ===
- Shish Ram Ola:
  - Former Cabinet Minister of Mines in Central Government
  - 9-time elected Member of Legislative Assembly in Rajasthan
  - 5-time elected Member of Parliament from Jhunjhunu constituency
- Brijendra Singh Ola:
  - Member of Legislative Assembly of Rajasthan (2023)
  - Former Transport Minister in Rajasthan Government
  - Currently elected for the 4th time as MLA from Jhunjhunu assembly
