= Jodhpur Lok Sabha constituency =

Lok Sabha Constituency in Rajasthan

Coordinates: 26.3°N 73.0°E

Jodhpur
- Lok Sabha constituency
- Interactive Map Outlining Jodhpur Lok Sabha Constituency

Constituency details
- Country: India
- Region: North India
- State: Rajasthan
- Assembly constituencies: Phalodi; Lohawat; Shergarh; Sardarpura; Jodhpur; Soorsagar; Luni; Pokaran
- Established: 1952
- Reservation: None

Member of Parliament
- 18th Lok Sabha
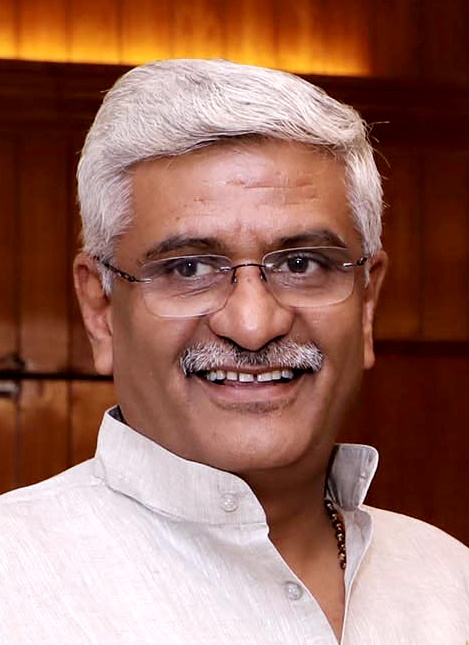
- Incumbent Gajendra Singh Shekhawat; Union Minister of Tourism; Union Minister of Culture
- Party: Bharatiya Janata Party
- Elected year: 2019
- Preceded by: Chandresh Kumari Katoch

Jodhpur Lok Sabha constituency (Hindi pronunciation: [d͡ʒoːd̪ʱ.pʊɾ]) is one of the 25 Lok Sabha (parliamentary) constituencies in Rajasthan state in India.

== Assembly segments ==
Presently, Jodhpur Lok Sabha constituency comprises eight Vidhan Sabha (legislative assembly) segments. These are:

#	Name	District	Member	Party	2024 Lead
122	Phalodi	Jodhpur	Pabba Ram Bishnoi	BJP	INC
123	Lohawat	Jodhpur	Gajendra Singh Khimsar	BJP	INC
124	Shergarh	Jodhpur	Babu Singh Rathore	BJP	BJP
127	Sardarpura	Jodhpur	Ashok Gehlot	INC	BJP
128	Jodhpur	Jodhpur	Atul Bhansali	BJP	BJP
129	Soorsagar	Jodhpur	Devendra Joshi	BJP	BJP
130	Luni	Jodhpur	Jogaram Patel	BJP	BJP
133	Pokaran	Jaisalmer	Mahant Pratap Puri	BJP	INC

== Members of Parliament ==
Year	Member	Party
1952	Jaswantraj Mehta	Independent
1957	Jaswantraj Mehta	Indian National Congress
1962	Laxmi Mall Singhvi	Independent
1967	Narendra Kumar Sanghi	Indian National Congress
1971	Krishna Kumari	Independent
1977	Ranchhordas Gattani	Janata Party
1980	Ashok Gehlot	Indian National Congress
1984	Ashok Gehlot	Indian National Congress
1989	Jaswant Singh	Bharatiya Janata Party
1991	Ashok Gehlot	Indian National Congress
1996	Ashok Gehlot	Indian National Congress
1998	Ashok Gehlot	Indian National Congress
1999	Jaswant Bishnoi	Bharatiya Janata Party
2004	Jaswant Bishnoi	Bharatiya Janata Party
2009	Chandresh Kumari Katoch	Indian National Congress
2014	Gajendra Singh Shekhawat	Bharatiya Janata Party
2019	Gajendra Singh Shekhawat	Bharatiya Janata Party
2024	Gajendra Singh Shekhawat	Bharatiya Janata Party

== Election results ==
=== 2024 ===
2024 Indian general election: Jodhpur
Party	Candidate	Votes	%	±%
BJP	Gajendra Singh Shekhawat	730,056	52.76	▼5.84
INC	Karan Singh Uchiyarda	6,14,379	44.40	▲6.19
BSP	Manju Meghwal	6,395	0.46	
RRP	Pappu Dan	654	0.05	
NOTA	None of the above	10,591	0.77	
Majority		1,15,677	8.36	
Turnout		13,83,838		
BJP hold		Swing		

=== 2019 ===
2019 Indian general elections: Jodhpur
Party	Candidate	Votes	%	±%
BJP	Gajendra Singh Shekhawat	788,888	58.60	▼07.48
INC	Vaibhav Gehlot	5,14,448	38.21	▲10.11
BSP	Mukul Chaudhary	11,703	0.87	−0.38
NOTA	None of the Above	11,688	0.87	−0.53
Margin of victory		2,74,440	20.39	−17.59
Turnout		13,47,933	68.89	
BJP hold		Swing		

=== 2014 ===
2014 Indian general elections: Jodhpur
Party	Candidate	Votes	%	±%
BJP	Gajendra Singh Shekhawat	713,515	66.08	+27.45
INC	Chandresh Kumari Katoch	3,03,464	28.10	−24.96
NOTA	None of the Above	15,085	1.40	N/A
BSP	Gopa Ram Meghwal	13,511	1.25	−2.17
AAP	Vigyan Modi	8,552	0.79	+0.79
Margin of victory		4,10,051	37.98	+23.55
Turnout		10,78,598	62.43	+17.20
BJP gain from INC		Swing	+13.02	

=== 2009 ===
2009 Indian general elections: Jodhpur
Party	Candidate	Votes	%	±%
INC	Chandresh Kumari Katoch	361,577	53.02	
BJP	Jaswant Singh Bishnoi	2,63,248	38.60	
BSP	Raju Ram	23,320	3.42	
Independent	Vijay Kumar	9,539	1.40	
Majority		98,329	14.43	
Turnout		6,81,472	45.23	
INC gain from BJP		Swing		

=== 2004 ===
2004 Indian general elections: Jodhpur
Party	Candidate	Votes	%	±%
BJP	Jaswant Singh Bishnoi	434,352	50.22	−5.95
INC	Badri Ram Jakhar	3,91,857	45.31	−6.43
Independent	Sabir Gauri	10,363	1.20	
JP	Ravi Garg	8,974	1.04	
Independent	Shaitan Singh Chouhan	4,682	0.54	
Independent	Devilal Bheel	3,827	0.44	
Independent	Mahmuda Begum Abbasi	3,118	0.36	−1.61
Independent	Vijay Krishna Sharma	2,684	0.31	
Independent	Dungari Lal Meghwal	1,658	0.19	
Independent	Leela Devi	1,592	0.18	
Independent	Badri Ram	970	0.11	
Independent	Pukhraj Meghwal	850	0.10	
Majority		42,495	4.91	−12.41
Turnout		8,64,927	55.04	+7.76
BJP hold		Swing	-5.95	

=== 1998 ===
1998 Indian general election: Jodhpur
Party	Candidate	Votes	%	±%
INC	Ashok Gehlot	369,780	48.64	
BJP	Jaswant Singh Bishnoi	3,64,336	47.93	
Majority		5,444	0.71	
Turnout		7,60,175	58.86	
INC hold		Swing		

=== 1996 ===
1996 Indian general election: Jodhpur
Party	Candidate	Votes	%	±%
INC	Ashok Gehlot	296,543	50.00	
BJP	Jaswant Singh	2,42,176	40.84	
Majority		54,367	9.16	
Turnout		5,93,043	43.34	
INC hold		Swing		

=== 1991 ===
1991 Indian general election: Jodhpur
Party	Candidate	Votes	%	±%
INC	Ashok Gehlot	275,900	50.92	
BJP	Ram Narain Bishnoi	2,26,332	41.77	
Majority		49,568	9.15	
Turnout		5,41,866	47.39	
INC gain from BJP		Swing		

=== 1984 ===
1984 Indian general election: Jodhpur
Party	Candidate	Votes	%	±%
INC	Ashok Gehlot	282,066	61.16	
BJP	Balveer Singh	1,28,718	27.91	
Majority		1,53,348	33.25	
Turnout		4,61,230	55.02	
INC hold		Swing		

=== 1980 ===
1980 Indian general election: Jodhpur
Party	Candidate	Votes	%	±%
INC(I)	Ashok Gehlot	171,574	43.79	
JP	Balbir Singh Kachhwah	1,19,055	30.38	
INC(U)	Poonam Chand Vishnoi	75,296	19.22	
Majority		52,519	13.41	
Turnout		3,91,838	54.98	
INC(I) gain from JP		Swing		

== See also ==
- Jodhpur district
- List of constituencies of the Lok Sabha
