= Poonam Chand Vishnoi =

Speaker of Rajasthan Legislative Assembly
- In office 1980-1985
- Preceded by: Gopal Singh
- Succeeded by: Hira Lal Devpura

Member of legislative Assembly
- In office 1980 to 1985
- Succeeded by: Mohan Lal Changani
- Constituency: Phalodi
- In office 1990 to 1998
- Preceded by: Mohan Lal Changani
- Succeeded by: Ram Narayan Bishnoi
- Constituency: Phalodi
- In office 1998 to 2003
- Constituency: Bhinmal
- In office 1957 to 1967
- Succeeded by: Ram Singh Bishnoi
- Constituency: Luni

Parliamentary Secretary Govt of Rajasthan
- In office 1998 to 2003

Personal details
- Born: 20 February 1924
- Died: 25 May 2006 (aged 82)
- Party: Indian National Congress

Poonam Chand Vishnoi (20 February 1924 – 25 May 2006) was an Indian politician who was speaker of Rajasthan Legislative Assembly from 7 July 1980 to 20 March 1985. He was a senior leader of Indian National Congress Party in Rajasthan. He hailed from Jodhpur region of Rajasthan. He was elected to Rajasthan Legislative Assembly from Bhinmal, Phalodi and Luni. He also served as deputy speaker of Rajasthan Legislative Assembly and Cabinet Minister in Rajasthan Government.

His daughter Vijay laxmi Bishnoi was Member of Rajasthan Legislative Assembly and Parliament Secretary between 1998 and 2003. She is ex-Chief of the Woman Wing of Indian National Congress and several boards in Rajasthan Government.

Poonam Chand Vishnoi had also contested the 1999 Loksabha election from Jodhpur (Lok Sabha constituency) as an INC candidate and lost to Jaswant Singh Bishnoi by a small margin.

== Early life ==
Poonam Chand Bishnoi was born in Feench village luni (tehsil) in District of Jodhpur. After doing LLB he was a practicing lawyer in Rajasthan High Court Jodhpur. In 1957, he successfully contested MLA election from Luni.
