= Jogaram Patel =

Indian politician

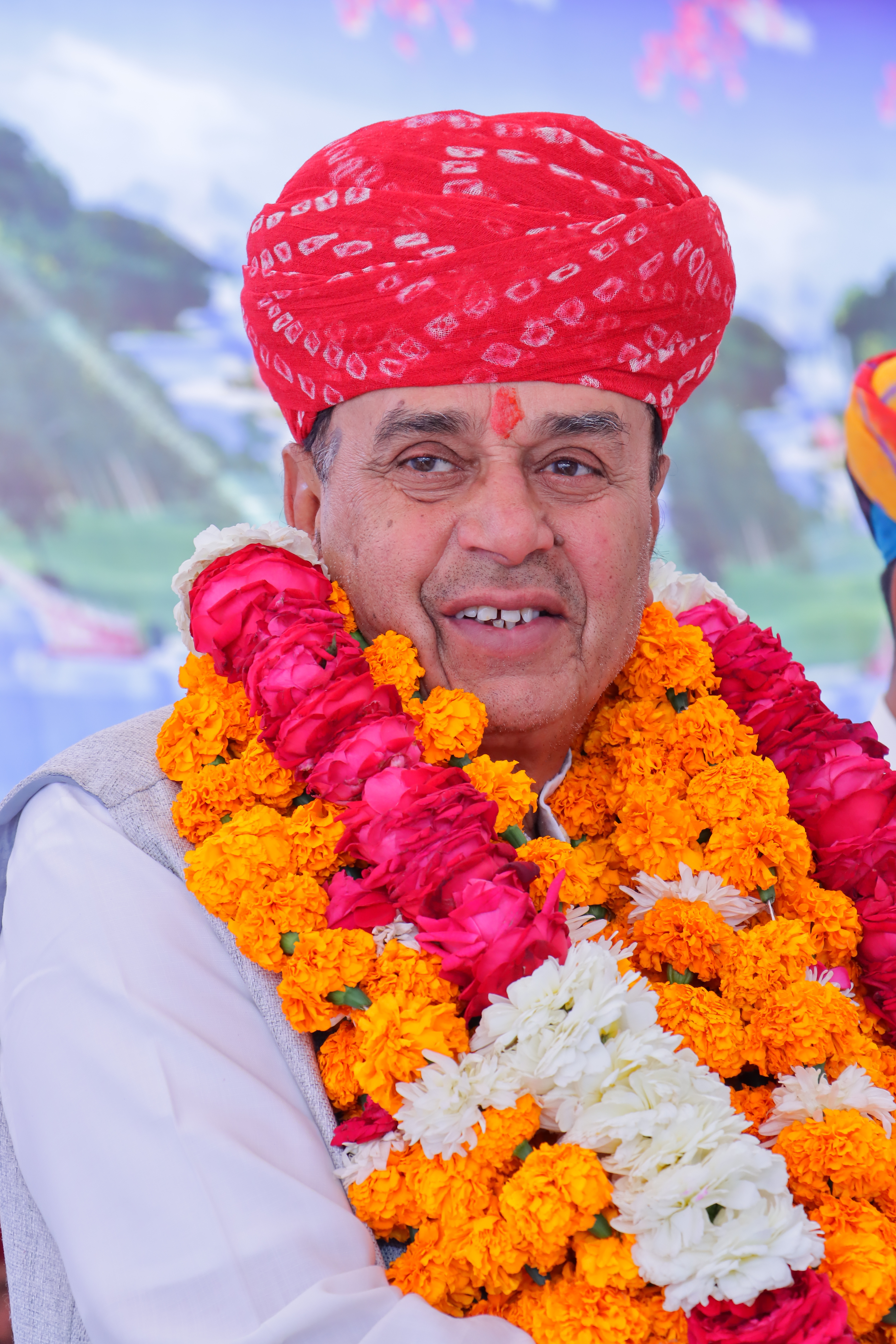
- Jogaram Patel

Cabinet Minister, Government of Rajasthan
- Incumbent
- Assumed office 30 December 2023
- Governor: Kalraj Mishra; Haribhau Bagade
- Chief Minister: Bhajan Lal Sharma
- Ministry and Departments: List: Parliamentary Affairs; Law & Legal Affairs; Legal Consultancy Office; Justice
- Preceded by: Shanti Kumar Dhariwal

Member of the Rajasthan Legislative Assembly
- Incumbent
- Assumed office 15 December 2023
- Preceded by: Mahendra Bishnoi
- Constituency: Luni
- In office 2013–2018
- Preceded by: Malkhan Singh Bishnoi
- Succeeded by: Mahendra Bishnoi
- Constituency: Luni
- In office December 2003 – January 2005
- Preceded by: Ram Singh Bishnoi
- Succeeded by: Malkhan Singh Bishnoi
- Constituency: Luni

Personal details
- Born: 1 December 1954 (age 71) Dundhara, Luni, Jodhpur, Rajasthan, India
- Party: Bharatiya Janata Party
- Spouse: Hira Devi Patel
- Children: 3
- Parent(s): Ramram (father); Gawri Devi (mother)
- Education: B.A. and LL.B.
- Alma mater: Jai Narain Vyas University
- Occupation: Politician
- Profession: Advocate
- Website: Official website

Jogaram Patel (born 1 December 1954) is an Indian politician currently serving as Cabinet Minister for Parliamentary Affairs, Law & Legal Affairs, Legal Consultancy, and Justice in the Government of Rajasthan. A member of the Bharatiya Janata Party (BJP), he represents the Luni Assembly constituency in the Rajasthan Legislative Assembly. He has been elected to the Assembly multiple times, including in 2003, 2013, and 2023.

== Early life and education ==
Patel was born in Dundhara village in Luni, Jodhpur district, Rajasthan. He obtained a Bachelor of Arts and Bachelor of Laws degree from Jai Narain Vyas University. Before entering politics, he worked as an advocate.

== Political career ==
Patel began his political career with the Bharatiya Janata Party. He was first elected to the Rajasthan Legislative Assembly from Luni in 2003. After a gap, he was re-elected in 2013, and again in 2023, defeating Mahendra Bishnoi of the Indian National Congress by a margin of 24,678 votes.

On 30 December 2023, following the BJP’s formation of the state government, he was appointed Cabinet Minister in the Bhajan Lal Sharma ministry. His portfolio includes Parliamentary Affairs, Law and Legal Affairs, Legal Consultancy, and Justice.

== Personal life ==
Patel is married to Hira Devi Patel, and they have three children. He resides in the Jodhpur district of Rajasthan.

== Electoral record ==
Election results
Year	Office	Constituency	Party	Votes (Jogaram Patel)	%	Opponent	Opponent Party	Votes	%	Result	Ref
2023	MLA	Luni	Bharatiya Janata Party	123,498	50.59	Mahendra Bishnoi	Indian National Congress	98,820	40.48	Won	
2018	MLA	Luni	Bharatiya Janata Party	75,822	33.99	Mahendra Bishnoi	Indian National Congress	84,979	38.10	Lost	
2013	MLA	Luni	Bharatiya Janata Party	96,386	51.51	Amri Devi Bishnoi	Indian National Congress	60,446	32.31	Won	
