= Mogra Kalan =

Village in Jodhpur, Rajasthan, India

Coordinates: 26°08′N 73°03′E

- Village
- Interactive map of Mogra Kalan
- Country: India
- State: Rajasthan
- District: Jodhpur
- Tehsil: Luni Tehsil

Population (2011)
  - Total: 4,049
- Postal code: 342802

Mogra Kalan is a village in Luni tehsil of Jodhpur, India, near National Highway 62, the Pali to Jodhpur route in Rajasthan. The village is 18 kilometres (11 mi) from Jodhpur. Its postal code is 342802. According to the 2011 census of India, the population of the village was 4,049 people (2,067 males; 1,982 females).

Thick calcareous deposits were noticed below aeolian formations in the Nadi sections at Mogra Kalan By Archaeological Survey of India.
