= Mahendra Bishnoi =

Indian politician from Rajasthan

Member of the Rajasthan Legislative Assembly
- In office 11 December 2018 – 3 December 2023
- Preceded by: Jogaram Patel
- Succeeded by: Jogaram Patel
- Constituency: Luni

Personal details
- Born: 5 October 1981 (age 44) Bilara, Jodhpur
- Party: Indian National Congress
- Spouse: Indu Bishnoi
- Children: 2
- Occupation: Business

Mahendra Bishnoi (born 5 October 1981) is an Indian politician. He was a member of the Rajasthan Legislative Assembly from Luni. He is a member of the Indian national congress.

== Personal life ==
Bishnoi is the grandson of Marwar's veteran leader Ram Singh Bishnoi and son of former Luni MLA Malkhan Singh Bishnoi. He hails from a political family.

== Political life ==
Bishnoi has carried on the family's legacy by winning from the Luni assembly seat. In 2018, he contested for the first time and won the election.

== See also ==
- Ram Singh Bishnoi
- Malkhan Singh Bishnoi
- Political families of Rajasthan
- Luni (Rajasthan Assembly constituency)
