= Babu Singh (Rajasthan politician) =

Indian politician

Babu Singh Ratore

Member of the Rajasthan Legislative Assembly
- In office 2003–2018
- Preceded by: Khet Singh Rathore
- Succeeded by: Meena Kanwar
- Constituency: Shergarh

MLA
- In office 2003–2008
- In office 2008–2013
- In office 2013–2018
- In office 2023–present

Personal details
- Born: 15 November 1972 (age 53); Nathrau, Jodhpur, Rajasthan
- Party: Bharatiya Janata Party
- Occupation: Politician

Babu Singh Rathore is an Indian politician from the Bharatiya Janata Party and a three-term member of the Rajasthan Legislative Assembly representing the Shergarh Vidhan Sabha constituency of Rajasthan.

In the 2018 election, Babu Singh lost to Indian National Congress candidate Meena Kanwar.

He won the election for the fourth time in 2023 by defeating INC candidate Meena Kanwar.
