= Phalodi Assembly constituency =

Constituency of the Rajasthan legislative assembly in India

Coordinates: 27.13°N 72.36°E

Phalodi
- Constituency No. 122 for the Rajasthan Legislative Assembly

Constituency details
- Country: India
- Region: North India
- State: Rajasthan
- District: Jodhpur district
- Established: 1951
- Reservation: None

Member of Legislative Assembly
- 16th Rajasthan Legislative Assembly
- Incumbent Pabba Ram Bishnoi
- Party: Bharatiya Janata Party

Phalodi Assembly constituency is one of constituencies of Rajasthan Legislative Assembly in the Jodhpur Lok Sabha constituency.

== Members of the Legislative Assembly ==
Year	Member	Party
1951	Himmat Singh	Independent
1957	Suraj Mal	Ram Rajya Parishad
1957	Khet Singh	Ram Rajya Parishad
1962	Lala Ram	Indian National Congress
1967	Deep Chand Chhangani	Independent
1972	Mohan Lal Chhangani	Indian National Congress
1977	Balkrishan	Janata Party
1980	Poonam Chand Bisnhoi	Indian National Congress
1985	Mohan Lal Chhangani	Independent
1990	Poonam Chand Bisnhoi	Indian National Congress
1993	Poonam Chand Bisnhoi	Indian National Congress
1998	Ram Narayan Bishnoi	Bharatiya Janata Party
2003	Ram Narayan Bishnoi	Bharatiya Janata Party
2008	Om Joshi	Indian National Congress
2013	Pabba Ram Bishnoi	Bharatiya Janata Party
2018	Pabba Ram Bishnoi	Bharatiya Janata Party
2023	Pabba Ram Bishnoi	Bharatiya Janata Party

== Election results ==
=== 2023 ===
2023 Rajasthan Legislative Assembly election: Phalodi
Party	Candidate	Votes	%	±%
BJP	Pabba Ram Bishnoi	80,243	44.95	+10.26
INC	Prakash Chandra Chhangani	69,459	38.91	+9.21
Independent	Nirnjan Mehra	12,549	7.03	
RLP	Abdul Mehboob Urf Pappu Khiljee	8,666	4.85	
NOTA	None of the above	1,860	1.04	−0.44
Majority		10,784	6.04	+1.05
Turnout		178,528	69.33	−7.04
BJP hold		Swing		

=== 2018 ===
2018 Rajasthan Legislative Assembly election: Phalodi
Party	Candidate	Votes	%	±%
BJP	Pabba Ram	60,735	34.69	
INC	Mahesh Kumar	51,998	29.7	
Independent	Kumbh Singh	48,306	27.59	
CPI(M)	Kishana Ram Urf Kishan Meghwal	4,318	2.47	
AAP	Ramesh Chand Sahu	2,037	1.16	
BSP	Kamla	1,978	1.13	
Independent	Gopal Urf Gopalram	1,906	1.09	
NOTA	None of the above	2,598	1.48	
Majority		8,737	4.99	
Turnout		175,056	76.37	
BJP gain from		Swing		

== See also ==
- Member of the Legislative Assembly (India)
