= Luni Assembly constituency =

Constituency of the Rajasthan legislative assembly in India

Coordinates: 26.00°N 73.00°E

Luni
- Constituency No. 130 for the Rajasthan Legislative Assembly

Constituency details
- Country: India
- Region: North India
- State: Rajasthan
- District: Jodhpur district
- Established: 1957
- Reservation: None

Member of Legislative Assembly
- 16th Rajasthan Legislative Assembly
- Incumbent Jogaram Patel
- Party: Bhartiya Janta Party

Luni Assembly constituency is one of constituencies of Rajasthan Legislative Assembly in the Jodhpur Lok Sabha constituency. Senior Congress leader Ram Singh Bishnoi used contest election from this seat.

== Members of the Legislative Assembly ==
Year	Member	Party
1957	Poonam Chand Bishnoi	Indian National Congress
1962	Swaroop Singh	Independent
1967	Poonam Chand Bishnoi	Indian National Congress
1972	Ram Singh Bishnoi	Indian National Congress
1977	Ram Singh Bishnoi	Indian National Congress
1980	Ram Singh Bishnoi	Indian National Congress
1985	Ram Singh Bishnoi	Indian National Congress
1990	Ram Singh Bishnoi	Indian National Congress
1993	Jaswant Singh Bishnoi	Bharatiya Janata Party
1998	Ram Singh Bishnoi	Indian National Congress
2003	Ram Singh Bishnoi	Indian National Congress
2003(By Poll)	Jogaram Patel	Bharatiya Janata Party
2008	Malkhan Singh Bishnoi	Indian National Congress
2013	Jogaram Patel	Bharatiya Janata Party
2018	Mahendra Bishnoi	Indian National Congress
2023	Jogaram Patel	Bharatiya Janata Party

== Election results ==
=== 2023 ===
2023 Rajasthan Legislative Assembly election: Luni
Party	Candidate	Votes	%	±%
BJP	Jogaram Patel	123,498	50.59	+16.6
INC	Mahendra Bishnoi	98,820	40.48	+2.38
RLP	Badrilal	16,529	6.77	−6.98
NOTA	None of the above	1,875	0.77	−0.27
Majority		24,678	10.11	+6.0
Turnout		244,113	72.83	−2.93
BJP gain from INC		Swing		

=== 2018 ===
2018 Rajasthan Legislative Assembly election: Luni
Party	Candidate	Votes	%	±%
INC	Mahendra Bishnoi	84,979	38.1	
BJP	Jogaram Patel	75,822	33.99	
RLP	Bhanwar Lal	30,662	13.75	
BSP	Pappu Singh	23,750	10.65	
NOTA	None of the above	2,315	1.04	
Majority		9,157	4.11	
Turnout		223,071	75.76	
INC gain from		Swing		

== See also ==
- Member of the Legislative Assembly (India)
