= Jaswant Singh Bishnoi =

Indian politician

Member of Parliament, Lok Sabha
- In office 1999 – 2009
- Preceded by: Ashok Gehlot
- Succeeded by: Chandresh Kumari Katoch
- Constituency: Jodhpur

Member of the Legislative Assembly
- In office 1993–1998
- Preceded by: Ram Singh Bishnoi
- Succeeded by: Ram Singh Bishnoi
- Constituency: Luni

Minister of Forest and Environment, Govt of Rajasthan
- In office 1993 to 1998

Chairman, Central Wool Development Board
- In office 2014 to 2018

Chairman of Rajasthan Khadi and Village Industries Board
- In office 2018

Personal details
- Born: 1 August 1958 (age 68) Jodhpur, Rajasthan, India
- Party: Bharatiya Janata Party
- Spouse: Sita Devi Bishnoi (m. 1977)
- Children: 2 sons and 2 daughters
- Education: B.A., LL.B
- Alma mater: Jai Narain Vyas University, Jodhpur
- Occupation: Advocate, Agriculturist, Businessperson
- As of 14 September, 2006

Jaswant Singh Bishnoi (born 1 August 1958) was a member of 13th and 14th Lok Sabha from Jodhpur. He is senior leader of Bharatiya Janata Party in Rajasthan.

== Early life ==
He was born in Khawa gotra village Guda Vishnoiyan in Jodhpur district and was educated at Jai Narain Vyas University at Jodhpur.

== Political life ==
He is senior leader of Bharatiya Janata Party in Rajasthan. He lost to Ashok Gehlot in the 1998 by narrow margin in Lok Sabha election but won 1999 and 2004 Lok Sabha elections. In 2009 he lost to Chandresh Kumari in Lok Sabha election. He is a former minister of Government of Rajasthan during Bhairon Singh Shekhawat's government. He defeated Ramsingh Bishnoi in the 1993 MLA election from Luni constituency and held Minister of State, Environment and Forests, Lottery, Small Savings, State Insurance, Public Health and Engineering Department in Government of Rajasthan under Chief Ministership of Bhairon Singh Shekhawat. Since August 2014 he has been Chairman of the Central Wool Development Board. In May 2018 he became chairman of Khadi Gramodhyog board of Rajasthan and after a few days was declared cabinet minister of Rajasthan government by Governor of Rajasthan Shri Kalyan Singh.
