= Gajendra Singh Shekhawat =

Indian politician (born 1967)

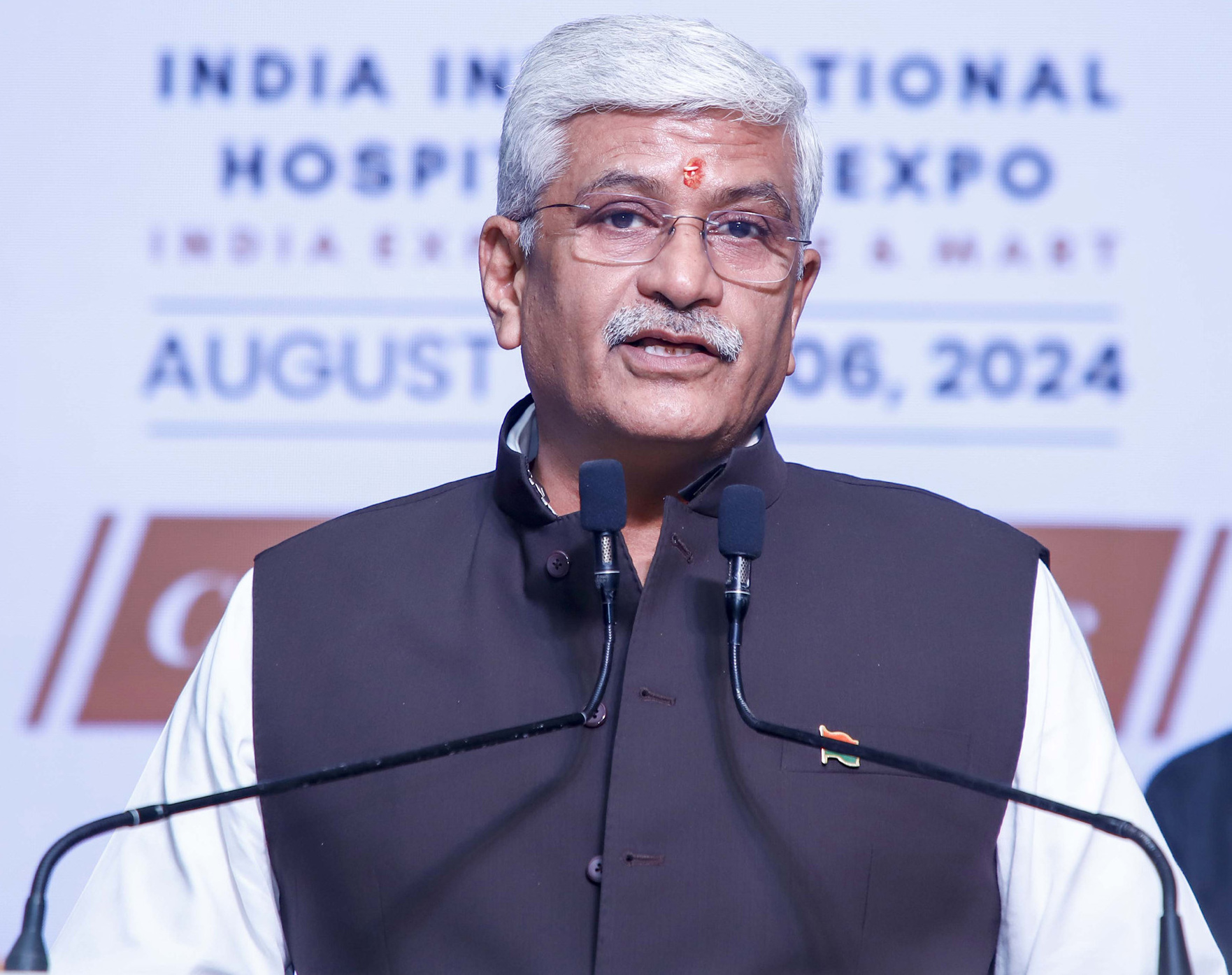
- Shekhawat in August 2024

Union Minister of Culture
- Incumbent
- Assumed office 9 June 2024
- President: Droupadi Murmu
- Prime Minister: Narendra Modi
- Preceded by: G. Kishan Reddy

Union Minister of Tourism
- Incumbent
- Assumed office 9 June 2024
- President: Droupadi Murmu
- Prime Minister: Narendra Modi
- Preceded by: G. Kishan Reddy

Union Minister of Jal Shakti
- In office 30 May 2019 – 9 June 2024
- Prime Minister: Narendra Modi
- Preceded by: Office established
- Succeeded by: C. R. Patil

Union Minister of State for Agriculture and Farmers' Welfare
- In office 3 September 2017 – 30 May 2019
- Prime Minister: Narendra Modi
- Minister: Radha Mohan Singh
- Preceded by: S. S. Ahluwalia
- Succeeded by: Kailash Choudhary

Member of Parliament, Lok Sabha
- Incumbent
- Assumed office 16 May 2014
- Preceded by: Chandresh Kumari Katoch
- Constituency: Jodhpur, Rajasthan

Personal details
- Born: 3 October 1967 (age 59) Jaisalmer, Rajasthan, India
- Party: Bharatiya Janata Party
- Spouse: Nonand Kanwar (m. 1993)
- Children: 3
- Education: Jai Narain Vyas University (M.A & M.Phil)
- Occupation: Politician

Gajendra Singh Shekhawat (born 3 October 1967; Hindi pronunciation: [gəd͡ʒeːn̪d̪ɾə sɪŋgʱ ʃeːkʰaːʋət̪]) is an Indian politician who is serving as the 13th Minister of Culture and 11th Minister of Tourism since 2024. He is a member of parliament from the Bharatiya Janata Party (BJP) representing Jodhpur in the Lok Sabha.

== Early life and education ==
Shekhawat was born in Jaisalmer in the Indian state of Rajasthan. His father, Shankar Singh Shekhawat, was a senior government officer in the water works department and travelled on frequent assignments across the state to several different schools. He received a Master of Arts and Master of philosophy from Jai Narain Vyas University, Jodhpur. He was the second of five children and was the only son, his younger sister is now a leading executive at CitiBank.

== Political career ==
Shekhawat began his political career in student politics when in 1992 he was elected as president of the Student Union at JNVU University, gaining more votes than any other previous Akhil Bhartiya Vidhyarthi Parishad supporter. Shekhawat was appointed National General Secretary of the BJP Kisan Morcha, the farmers wing of the Bharatiya Janta Party. He was also a member of the Rajasthan State Executive of the Bharatiya Janata Party.

He was elected as a member of parliament to the 16th Lok Sabha in 2014, with the highest ever winning margin (4,10,051 votes) from the constituency of Jodhpur.

Known for his use of social media, Shekhawat is the most followed Indian politician on Quora. His Quora profile has more than 83,749 followers and his answers on the social media platform have been viewed 8 million times. He also served as the Chairperson of the Fellowship Committee, member of the All India Council of Sports (AICS) and member of the Standing Committee on Finance.

== Union Minister ==
On 3 September 2017 he was appointed Union Minister of State, Ministry of Agriculture and Farmers Welfare. He defeated Vaibhav Gehlot, the son of Ashok Gehlot, the Chief Minister of Rajasthan from Jodhpur by a margin of 2.74 lakh votes in 2019 Indian general elections. Shekhawat became the Minister of Jal Shakti on 31 May 2019.

On 5 November 2026, Shekhawat welcomed the inclusion of manuscripts of the Mahabharata, Kautilya's Arthashastra and Kalhana's Rajatarangini in UNESCO's Memory of the World Asia-Pacific Regional Register. He described it as "a moment of immense pride for India" and "a landmark recognition of India's extraordinary documentary and civilisational heritage" He also credited Prime Minister Narendra Modi's leadership for bringing greater international recognition to India's civilisational heritage.

== Social works ==
Before entering electoral politics, Shekhawat held many positions in many forums and organisations; he was the co-convener of the Swadeshi Jagaran Manch, the economic wing of the Sangh Parivar and the General Secretary of Seema Jan Kalyan Samiti, an organisation dedicated to strengthening national security by developing border towns and villages. As General Secretary, he was instrumental in building a second line of defence that consisted of civilians residing near the border area of Rajasthan. He was also instrumental in furthering the impact of civil defence by setting up 40 schools and four hostels along the India-Pakistan border.

In October 2024, he launched the first coal gallery at the National Science Centre in New Delhi, India.

Lok Sabha
Preceded by Chandresh Kumari Katoch	Member of Parliament for Jodhpur; 2014 – Present	Succeeded by Incumbent
Political offices
Preceded by N/A; Ministry created by merging Ministry of Drinking Water and Sanitation and Ministry of Water Resources, River Development and Ganga Rejuvenation	Minister of Jal Shakti; 30 May 2019 - Present	Incumbent
