= Shergarh Assembly constituency =

Constituency of the Rajasthan legislative assembly in India

Coordinates: 26.33°N 72.29°E

Shergarh
- Constituency No. 124 for the Rajasthan Legislative Assembly

Constituency details
- Country: India
- Region: North India
- State: Rajasthan
- District: Jodhpur district
- Established: 1951
- Reservation: None

Member of Legislative Assembly
- 16th Rajasthan Legislative Assembly
- Incumbent Meena Kanwar
- Party: Indian National Congress

Shergarh Assembly constituency is one of constituencies of Rajasthan Legislative Assembly in the Jodhpur Lok Sabha constituency.

== Members of the Legislative Assembly ==
Year	Member	Party
1951	Khet Singh Rathore	Independent
1962	Sobhag Singh	Ram Rajya Party
1967	Khet Singh Rathore	Indian National Congress
1972	Khet Singh Rathore	Indian National Congress
1977	Khet Singh Rathore	Indian National Congress
1980	Khet Singh Rathore	Indian National Congress
1985	Ratan Kanwar	Bharatiya Janata Party
1990	Manohar Singh Inda	Bharatiya Janata Party
1993	Khet Singh Rathore	Indian National Congress
1998	Khet Singh Rathore	Indian National Congress
2003	Babu Singh Rathore	Bharatiya Janata Party
2008	Babu Singh Rathore	Bharatiya Janata Party
2013	Babu Singh Rathore	Bharatiya Janata Party
2018	Meena Kanwar	Indian National Congress

== Election results ==
=== 2023 ===
2023 Rajasthan Legislative Assembly election: Shergarh
Party	Candidate	Votes	%	±%
BJP	Babu Singh Rathor	102,868	49.66	+11.54
INC	Meena Kanwar	77,824	37.57	−13.07
RLP	Jora Ram	16,952	8.18	+2.51
BSP	Junjaram	2,206	1.07	+0.13
NOTA	None of the above	1,553	0.75	−1.03
Majority		25,044	12.09	−0.43
Turnout		207,127	75.08	−3.78
BJP gain from INC		Swing		

=== 2018 ===
2018 Rajasthan Legislative Assembly election: Shergarh
Party	Candidate	Votes	%	±%
INC	Meena Kanwar	99,916	50.64	
BJP	Babu Singh Rathore	75,220	38.12	
RLP	Taga Ram Bhill	11,187	5.67	
Independent	Puran Prakash	2,855	1.45	
BSP	Shiva Ram	1,853	0.94	
NOTA	None of the above	3,506	1.78	
Majority		24,696	12.52	
Turnout		197,319	78.86	
INC gain from		Swing		

== See also ==
- Member of the Legislative Assembly (India)
