= Chandresh Kumari Katoch =

Indian politician (born 1944)

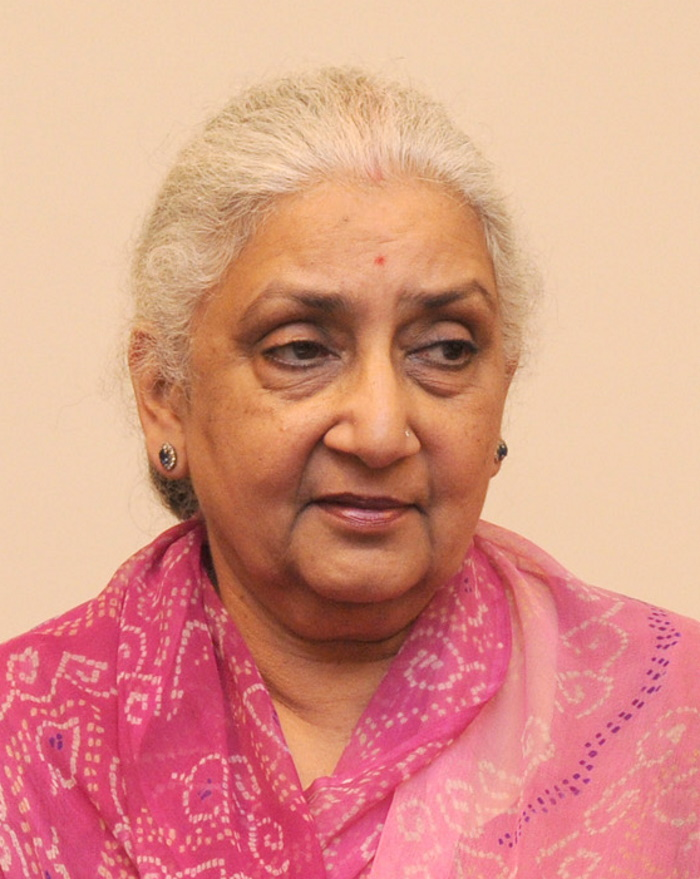
- Katoch in 2012

Minister of Culture
- In office 2012–2014
- President: Pranab Mukherjee
- Prime Minister: Manmohan Singh
- Preceded by: Kumari Selja
- Succeeded by: Shripad Yasso Naik

Member of Parliament
- In office 2009–2014
- President: Pranab Mukherjee
- Prime Minister: Manmohan Singh
- Preceded by: Jaswant Singh Bishnoi
- Succeeded by: Gajendra Singh Shekhawat
- Constituency: Jodhpur
- In office 1984–1989
- President: Zail Singh
- Prime Minister: Rajiv Gandhi
- Preceded by: Vikram Chand Mahajan
- Constituency: Kangra

Personal details
- Born: Chandresh Kumari Singh; 1 February 1944 (age 82) Jodhpur, Jodhpur State, British India
- Party: Indian National Congress
- Spouse: Aditya Katoch (1968–present)
- Children: Aishwarya Singh (born 1970)
- Education: University of Jodhpur (now Jai Narain Vyas University)

Chandresh Kumari Katoch (née Rathore; born 1 February 1944) is an Indian politician belonging to the Indian National Congress party. She is a former Minister of Culture in India's central government. She was a Member of Parliament in the Lok Sabha (the lower house of parliament), representing Jodhpur constituency.

Katoch was sworn in as Cabinet Minister in the Government of India on 28 October 2012, and was given the portfolio of the Ministry of Culture. She is daughter of Maharaja Hanwant Singh of Jodhpur and Maharani Krishna Kumari and is married into the royal family of Kangra with Raja Aditya Dev Chand Katoch, in Himachal Pradesh. She contested but lost the 2014 Indian general election.

== Positions held ==
- 1972–77 Member, Himachal Pradesh Legislative Assembly( from Dharamshala constituency)
- 1977 Deputy Minister, Government of Himachal Pradesh
- 1982–84 Member, Himachal Pradesh Legislative Assembly (second term from Dharamshala constituency)
- 1984 (for 9 Months) Minister of State, Tourism, Govt. of Himachal Pradesh
- 1984 Elected to 8th Lok Sabha from Kangra (Lok Sabha constituency)
- 1996 Elected to Rajya Sabha
- 1998–1999 Deputy Chief Whip, Congress Party in Rajya Sabha
- 1999-03 President, All India Mahila Congress
- 2003–07 Member, Himachal Pradesh Legislative Assembly (third term from Dharamshala constituency)
- 2003–2004 Cabinet Minister, Govt. of Himachal Pradesh
- 2009 Re-elected to 15th Lok Sabha from Jodhpur (2nd term)
- 2012 Cabinet Minister, Ministry of Cultural, Government of India.
