= Pabba Ram Bishnoi =

Indian politician from Rajasthan (born 1951)

Member of Rajasthan Legislative Assembly
- Incumbent
- Assumed office 11 December 2013
- Preceded by: Om Joshi
- Constituency: Phalodi

Personal details
- Born: March 24, 1951 (age 75) Lohawat, Jodhpur, Rajasthan
- Party: Bhartiya Janta Party
- Spouse: Smt. Tulsi Devi
- Children: 2 Sons & 4 Daughters
- Parent: Shri Barsinga Ram (father)
- Education: M.A. B.ed
- Alma mater: Rajasthan University
- Occupation: Agriculture, Ex. Army, Ex. Principal of Govt School Lohawat

Pabba Ram Bishnoi (born 24 March 1951) is an Indian politician from Rajasthan. He is presently a MLA from Phalodi.

== Political career ==
Pabba Ram won the election (14th Vidhan Sabha) in December 2013 from Phalodi constituency, as a candidate of Bharatiya Janta Party. In the Vidhan Sabha, he is a member of Committee, Estimates "A" (2016–17).
