= Meena Kanwar =

Indian politician

Member of the Rajasthan Legislative Assembly
- Incumbent
- Assumed office 11 December 2018
- Constituency: Shergarh

Personal details
- Born: 15 January 1971 (age 55) Gododa, Sikar
- Party: Indian National Congress
- Education: M.A.
- Occupation: Agriculture
- Website: Meena Kanwar profile on Rajasthan Congress Website

Meena Kanwar is an Indian politician who is an elected member from Shergarh in Jodhpur district of Rajasthan and is a member of the Congress Party.

== Political career ==
Meena Kanwar contested the 2018 Rajasthan assembly election from Shergarh in Jodhpur district, where she won by 99,916 votes.
