= Richpal Singh Mirdha =

Indian politician

Member of the Rajasthan Legislative Assembly
- In office 1990–2008
- Preceded by: Kalyan Singh
- Succeeded by: Ajay Singh kilak
- Constituency: Degana

Personal details
- Born: Kuchera,Nagaur, Rajasthan
- Party: Bharatiya Janata Party (2024- Present)
- Other political affiliations: Indian National Congress (till 2024)

Richpal Singh Mirdha is an Indian politician from Nagaur, Rajasthan who served as the member of Rajasthan Legislative Assembly representing Degana constituency from Indian National Congress. He is a member of the Mirdha Dynasty of Nagaur. He joined Bharatiya Janata Party in 2023.

== Political career ==
In the 1990 Rajasthan Assembly elections he was elected for his first term from Degana seat of Nagaur.

He represented the Degana constituency in the Rajasthan Legislative Assembly from 1990 to 2008, serving four consecutive terms:

- MLA – 1990 (Janta Dal),
- MLA – 1993 (Indian National Congress),
- MLA – 1998 (Independent),
- MLA – 2003 (Indian National Congress)

He lost his seat in 2008 by a margin of 1174 votes to Ajay Singh Kilak of BJP.
