= Luni, Rajasthan =

Luni
- City
- Interactive map of Luni
- Location in Rajasthan, India Luni (India)
- Coordinates: 26.0017°N 73.0022°E
- Country: India
- State: Rajasthan
- District: Jodhpur district

Government
  - Member of Parliament: Gajendra Singh Shekhawat ( 2014- Present )
  - Member of the Legislative Assembly (India): Jogaram Patel

Languages
  - Official: Hindi and Rajasthani
- Time zone: UTC+5:30 (IST)
- PIN: 342802
- Telephone code: 02931
- Vehicle registration: RJ 19

Luni is a town in Jodhpur district of the Indian state of Rajasthan. It is located 35 km South from Jodhpur district headquarter. Luni is also the headquarter of Luni tehsil.

== Geography ==
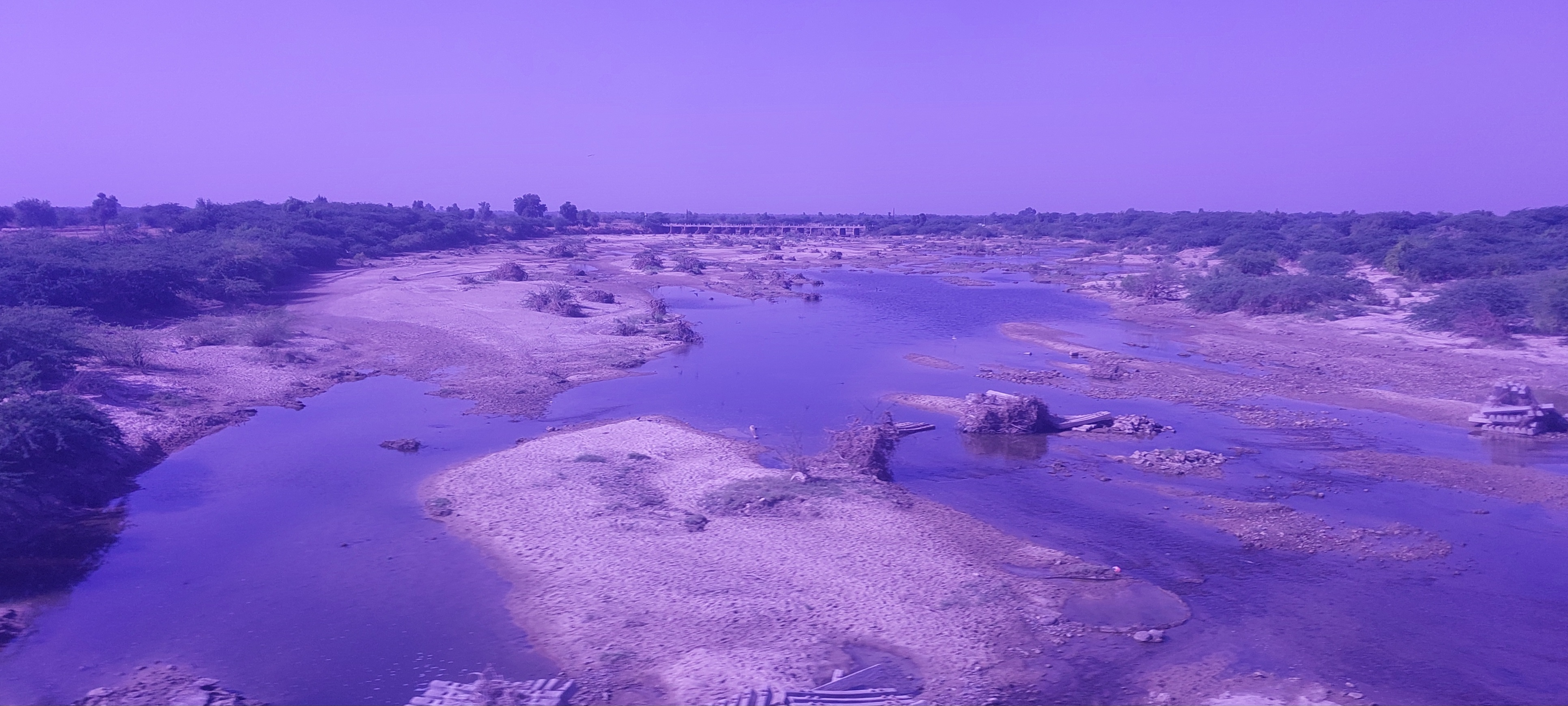
Luni river near Luni town

Luni is located in Central Rajasthan on the banks of the Luni River. Luni is near the villages of Shikarpura, Satlana, French, and Barliya. The nearest city, the District capital of Jodhpur, is 35 km (22 mi) away. The artisans inhabiting the village pursue their ancestral profession of fashioning metal, clay or wood into intricate forms.

== Climate ==
During the summer, the temperature can go as high as 44 °C (111 °F). In the winter, it can range from 15 degrees to 25 degrees. Nights are cool and days are hot and humid.

== Tourist attractions in Luni ==
=== Fort Chanwa ===
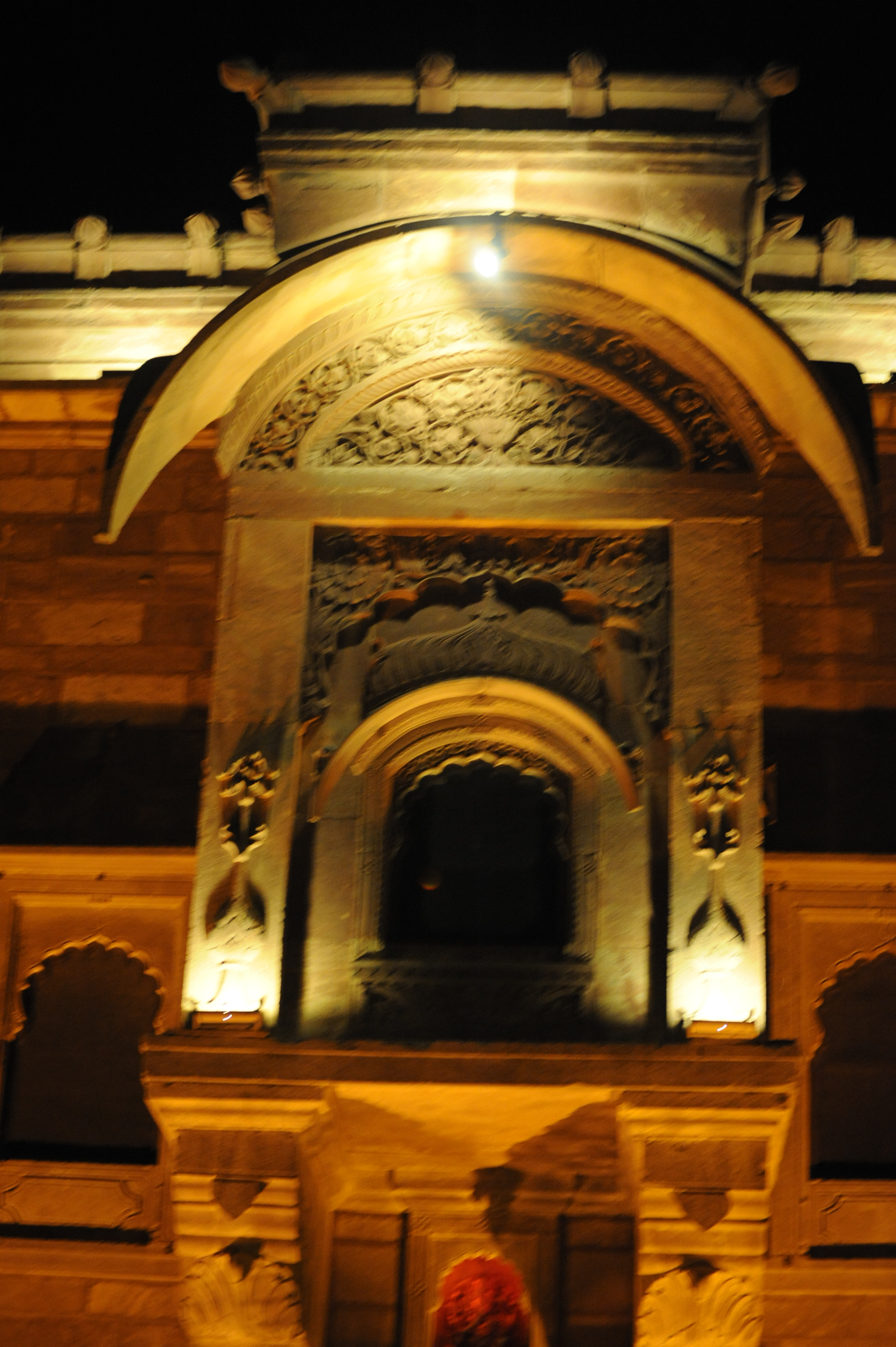
Chanwa Fort in Luni

Fort Chanwa is a red sandstone fort. It was built around 1895 by Kaviraja Muraridan of Bhandiyawas who received Luni as jagir during the rule of Maharaja Jaswant Singh II of Marwar. The red sandstone was brought from Jodhpur for construction. Later the fort became a heritage hotel. Its main features are manicured gardens, carved lattice work friezes and Jharokas (or balconies).

=== Shikarpura ===
In Rajasthan, saint Raja Ram established a Math (Ashram) in Shikarapura near Luni, Jodhpur. This ashram is famous as Shikarpura Ashram.
