= Ram Singh Bishnoi =

Indian politician from Rajasthan

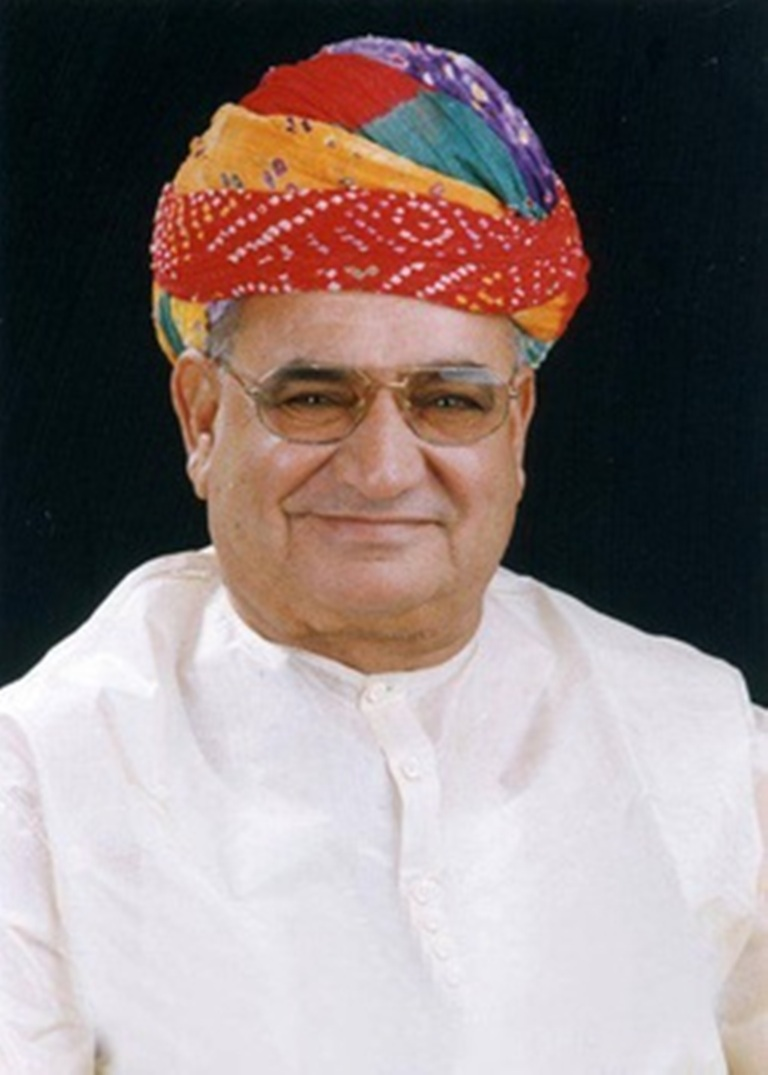
- Ram Singh Bishnoi

Member of the Rajasthan Legislative Assembly
- In office 1998–2003
- Constituency: Luni
- In office 1972–1990
- Constituency: Luni

Personal details
- Born: October 20, 1935 Tilwasni, Jodhpur
- Died: October 22, 2004
- Party: Indian National Congress
- Spouse: Smt. Amri Devi Bishnoi
- Children: 3 Sons & 1 Daughter Grand Child- Sidhi Bishnoi

Ram Singh Bishnoi was an Indian National Congress politician and senior leader from Tilwasni Village in Bilara Tehsil of Jodhpur District in Rajasthan, India. He was an MLA from Luni constituency seven times. His grandson Mahendra Bishnoi is currently an MLA from Luni. His son Malkhan singh Bishnoi was former MLA from Luni and Paras ram Bishnoi was Pcc Member of Rajasthan Congress.

== Personal life ==
Ram Singh Bishnoi was born in village Tilwasni, Bilara, Jodhpur. He was married to Amri devi Bishnoi. Former Luni MLA Malkhan Singh is his son. Son Paras ram Bishnoi was Pcc member from Rajasthan.

== See also ==
- Malkhan Singh Bishnoi
- Mahendra Bishnoi
- Luni VidhanSabha
- Bishnoi Political Family
