= Ashok Gehlot =

Indian politician (born 1951)

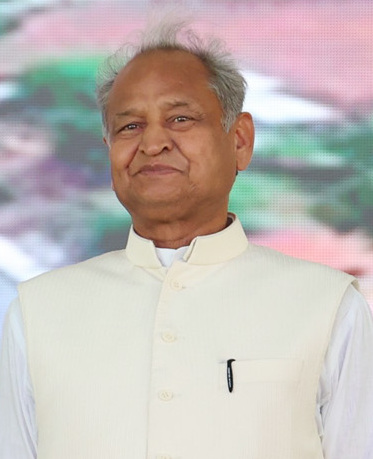
- Gehlot in 2023

12th Chief Minister of Rajasthan
- In office 17 December 2018 – 15 December 2023
- Governor: Kalyan Singh; Kalraj Mishra
- Deputy: Sachin Pilot (until 14 July 2020)
- Preceded by: Vasundhara Raje
- Succeeded by: Bhajan Lal Sharma
- In office 13 December 2008 – 12 December 2013
- Governor: Shilendra Kumar Singh; Prabha Rau; Shivraj Patil; Margaret Alva
- Preceded by: Vasundhara Raje
- Succeeded by: Vasundhara Raje
- In office 1 December 1998 – 8 December 2003
- Governor: Navrang Lal Tibrewal; Anshuman Singh (politician); Nirmal Chandra Jain
- Deputy: Banwari Lal Bairwa, Kamla Beniwal (from 25 January 2003)
- Preceded by: Bhairon Singh Shekhawat
- Succeeded by: Vasundhara Raje

Member of the Rajasthan Legislative Assembly
- Incumbent
- Assumed office 1 December 1998
- Preceded by: Man Singh Deora
- Constituency: Sardarpura

General Secretary (Organisation) of AICC
- In office December 2017 – January 2019
- Succeeded by: K. C. Venugopal

Union Minister of State for Tourism and Civil Aviation
- In office 31 December 1984 – 26 September 1985
- Prime Minister: Rajiv Gandhi

Deputy Union Minister for Sports
- In office 7 February 1984 – 31 October 1984
- Prime Minister: Indira Gandhi

Union Minister of State (Independent Charge) for Textiles
- In office 21 June 1991 – 18 January 1993
- Prime Minister: P. V. Narasimha Rao

Member of Parliament, Lok Sabha
- In office 1991–1998
- Constituency: Jodhpur
- In office 1980–1989
- Constituency: Jodhpur

Personal details
- Born: 3 May 1951 (age 75) Jodhpur, Rajasthan, India
- Party: Indian National Congress
- Spouse: Sunita Gehlot
- Children: 2
- Occupation: Politician
- Nickname: Jaadugar

Ashok Gehlot (born 3 May 1951) is an Indian politician who served as the Chief Minister of Rajasthan from 1998 to December 2003, then again from 2008 to December 2013, and later from 2018 to December 2023. He represents Sardarpura constituency of Jodhpur as Member of Legislative Assembly of Rajasthan since 1998. He was a Member of Parliament, Lok Sabha from Jodhpur from 1991 to 1998 and from 1980 to 1989 and Union Minister of State (Independent Charge) for Textile from 1991 to 1993, Tourism and Civil Aviation from 1984 to 1984 and Deputy Union minister for Sports from 1984 to 1984. He was also a national General secretary of Congress Party, in-charge of organisations and training from March 2018 to 23 January 2019. He was also made in-charge of Gujarat state in 2017 Gujarat Legislative Assembly election.

== Personal life ==
Ashok Gehlot is the son of Laxman Singh Gehlot, a magician who used to travel around the country to show his magic tricks. He belongs to the Mali caste. Gehlot's father served as the president of the Jodhpur Municipal Corporation for two terms, as the vice-president for one term and was a mining contractor. He is a science and law graduate, he also holds an MA degree in economics. He is married to Sunita Gehlot and has a son and a daughter. His son Vaibhav Gehlot is a politician who contested the Lok Sabha elections of 2019 from Jodhpur.

He is a member of the Indian National Congress (INC) party. He was influenced by the teachings of Mahatma Gandhi at a very young age and was actively engaged in social political work even as a student. During the East Bengali refugees crisis in 1971, he served in the refugee camps in the eastern states of India. It is there when former Prime Minister Indira Gandhi first identified his organizational skills during one of her visits to the refugee camps. Gehlot was later appointed the first State President of National Students' Union of India and successfully organised Congress's Student Wing in the state. Gehlot is a staunch Gandhiite and he lived in Wardha to adapt his lifestyle as a Gandhiite. He eats before sunset and is a pure vegetarian and enjoys Satvik Meals, thereby making him a teetotaler.

== Political career ==
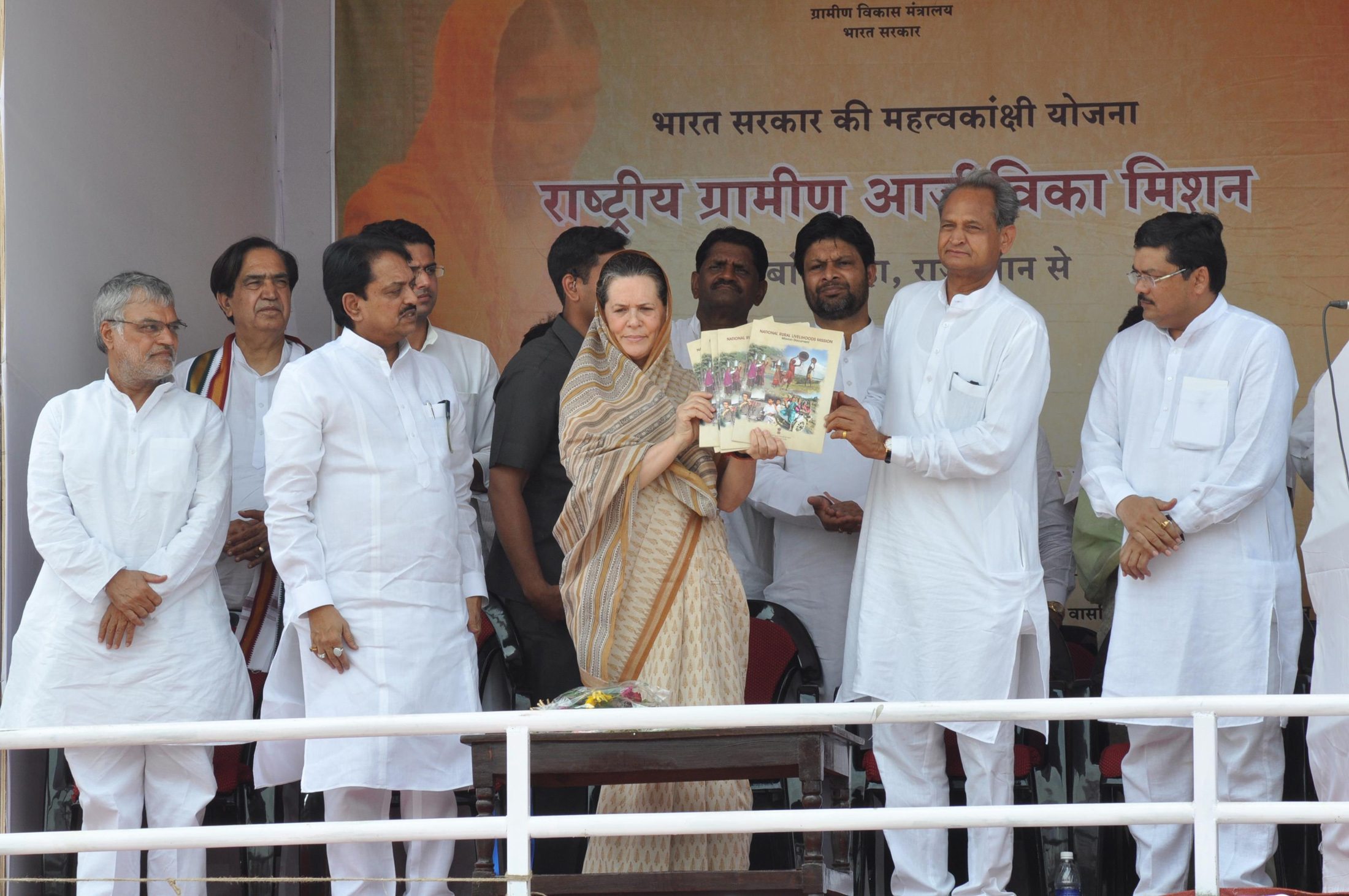
Sonia Gandhi and Chief Minister of Rajasthan, Ashok Gehlot, launching the National Rural Livelihood Mission (NRLM), at Banswara, Rajasthan

He contested his first election for Rajasthan Legislative assembly in 1977 for Sardarpura constituency and lost by a margin of 4426 votes to his closest opponent Madhav Singh of the Janata Party. Gehlot had to sell his motorcycle to contest his first election. In 1980 he contested Lok Sabha election from Jodhpur and won by a margin of 52,519 votes. In 1984 he was appointed the Union Minister. In 1989 he lost the election from Jodhpur.

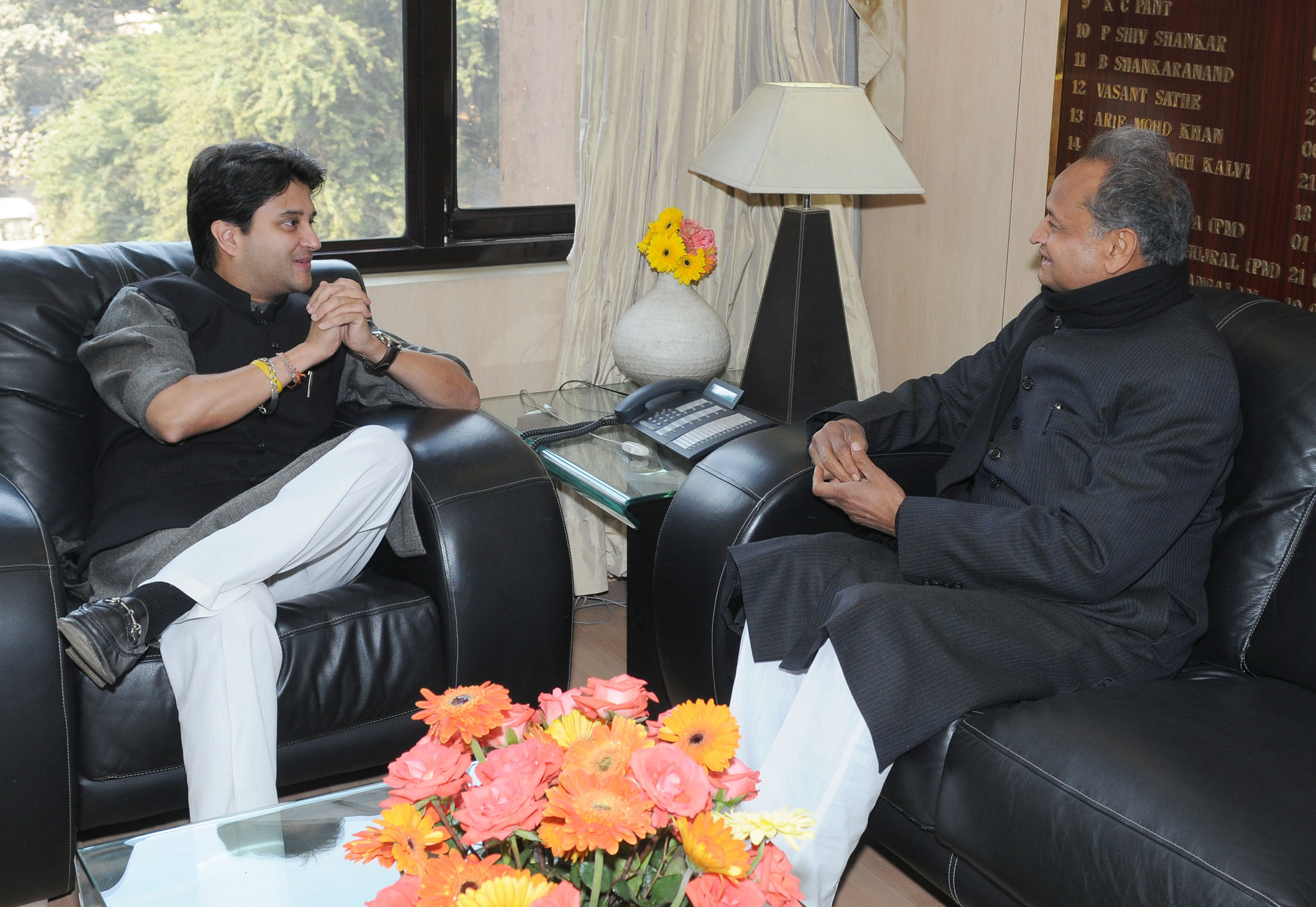
Chief Minister of Rajasthan, Ashok Gehlot meeting the Minister of State (Independent Charge) for Power, Jyotiraditya Scindia, in New Delhi on 8 January 2013

When the Congress party returned to power in 1991 he was appointed Union Minister again by then Prime Minister P.V. Narasimha Rao. He was discharged from his duty in 1993 and headed towards his home state Rajasthan to manage Congress political affairs. In 1998, Congress won a landslide victory by winning 153 out of 200 seats. Ashok Gehlot was appointed the Chief Minister of Rajasthan for the first time. (Note: He was non-elected member of Assembly, that time so Man Singh Deora vacated his seat Sadarpura.)

In 2003, Congress lost Rajasthan and won merely 56 seats. In 2008 Rajasthan Legislative Assembly election Congress was short of a majority by 4 seats and Gehlot who was a well-known troubleshooter in Congress was appointed the Chief Minister to prevent instability and thus he was sworn in for the second time as Chief Minister.

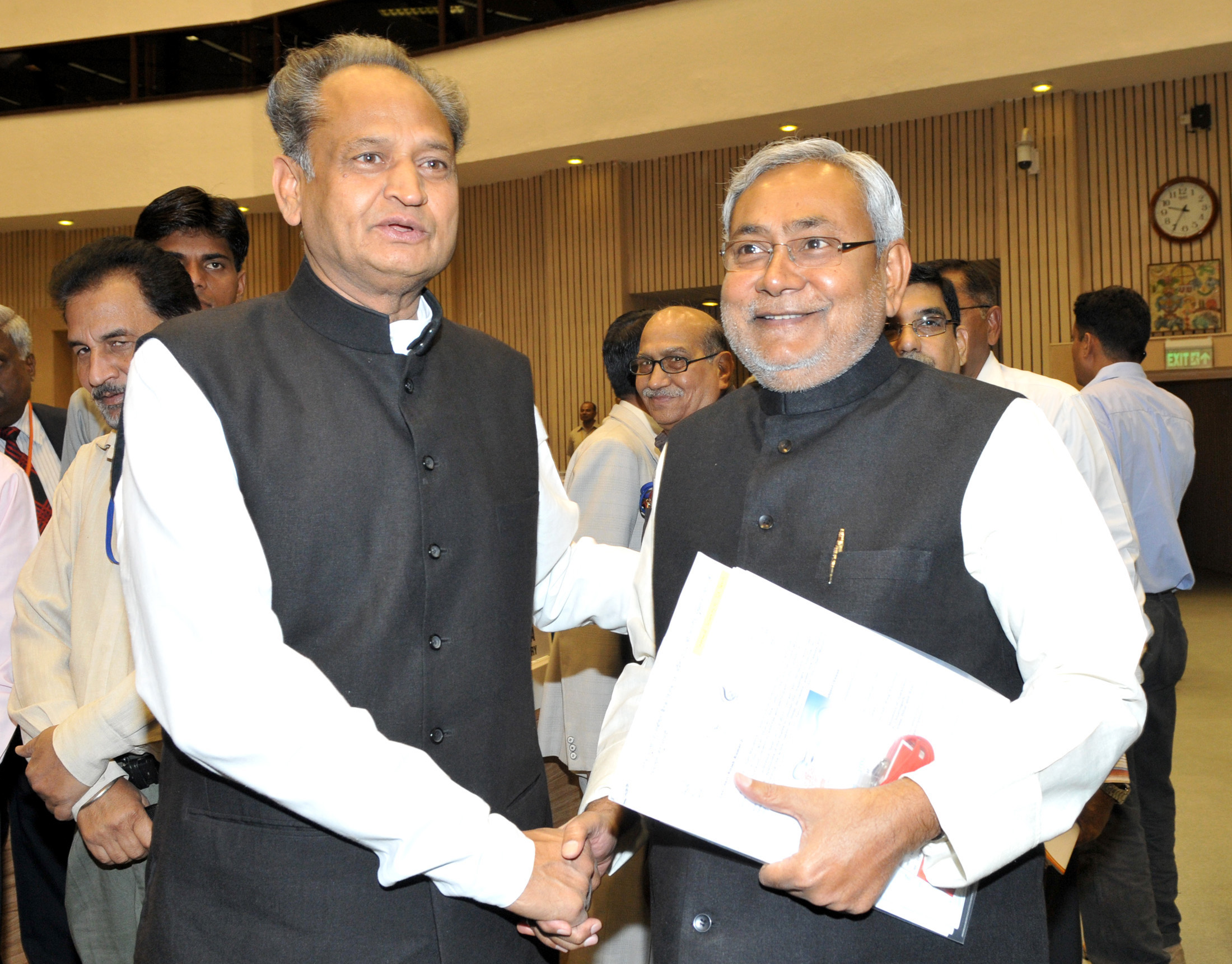
The Chief Minister of Bihar, Nitish Kumar with the Chief Minister of Rajasthan, Ashok Gehlot at the Chief Ministers' Conference on Internal Security, in New Delhi on 16 April 2012

In 2013, Congress suffered its worst-ever defeat by only winning 21 seats in 200 member assembly. Gehlot was then appointed AICC General Secretary in 2013. He remained at the position till 2018 and after 2018 Rajasthan Legislative Assembly election, when Congress returned to power he was appointed the Chief Minister for the third time despite the strong candidacy of Sachin Pilot due to his role in the revival of Congress after its worst-ever defeat in Legislative Elections. Sachin Pilot was appointed Deputy Chief Minister.

In 2022, it was reported that Sonia Gandhi supports Gehlot leading Congress in the 2024 Indian general election.

Gehlot recently announced that he is in favour of conducting a caste census. He announced that a six per cent additional reservation for the most backward castes within the Other Backward Class (OBC) category in the state will be provided. Varta Broadcasting (Tariq M. Kidwai) helps him to interact with public.

In 2023 Rajasthan Legislative Assembly election, he once again won from the Sardarpura constituency.

== Electoral performance ==
Lok Sabha
Year	Constituency	Party	Votes	%	Opponent	Party	Votes	%	Margin	Margin in %	Result
1980	Jodhpur	INC	1,71,574	43.79%	Balbir Singh Kachhwah	JP	1,19,055	30.38%	52,519	13.41%	Won
1984	Jodhpur	INC	2,82,066	61.16%	Balveer Singh	BJP	1,28,718	27.91%	1,53,348	33.25%	Won
1991	Jodhpur	INC	2,75,900	50.92%	Ram Bishnoi	BJP	2,26,332	41.77%	49,568	9.15%	Won
1996	Jodhpur	INC	2,96,543	50.00%	Jaswant Singh Bishnoi	BJP	2,42,176	40.84%	54,367	10.84%	Won
1998	Jodhpur	INC	3,69,780	48.64%	Jaswant Singh Bishnoi	BJP	3,64,336	47.93%	5,444	0.71%	Won

Rajasthan Legislative Assembly
Year	Constituency	Party	Votes	%	Opponent	Party	Votes	%	Margin	Margin in %	Result
1999 (by -election)	Sardarpura	INC			MeghRaj Lohia	BJP			49,280		Won
2003	Sardarpura	INC	58,509	56.74%	Mahendra Kumar	BJP	39,518	38.32%	18,991	18.42%	Won
2008	Sardarpura	INC	55,516	55.42%	Rajendra Gehlot	BJP	40,176	40.10%	15,340	15.32%	Won
2013	Sardarpura	INC	77,835	54.96%	Shambhu Singh	BJP	59,357	41.91	18,478	13.05%	Won
2018	Sardarpura	INC	97,081	63.31%	Shambhu Singh	BJP	51,484	33.57	45,597	29.74%	Won
2023	Sardarpura	INC	96,859	56.67%	Mahendra Rathore	BJP	70,463	41.23	26,396	15.44%	Won

== Administrative policies ==
=== Right to Health bill ===
In 2023, Ashok Gehlot's government brought the "Right to Health" bill, which was aimed at providing free medical facilities to all the residents of Rajasthan in every medical establishment in the state. The bill provided that every health establishment, whether public or private, located in Rajasthan will have to provide health facilities in emergency situation free of cost to patient, who is a resident of Rajasthan. Though hailed as a positive step by many, the bill's provisions were condemned by Indian Medical Association and the private doctors of the state. Many of them took to street against the bill and several concerns were raised upon viability of the scheme. The critics of the bill argued that it will bring the private establishment under tight control of bureaucracy, which will impede their proper functioning. The private medical facilities also protested on the fact that the bill hasn't described that how the private medical facilities will be reimbursed after providing free medical facilities to patients in emergency situation. The bill was also criticised for not defining the term "emergency situation". However, after the talks with the stakeholders, Gehlot's government was able to implement the provisions of bill with certain changes. It was informed by government authorities that the hospitals with less than fifty beds were excluded from enforcement of the provisions and only those private hospitals built with the government's help or subsidies will have to implement the provisions. With the bringing of universal right to health through this bill, Rajasthan became the first state in India to do so.

=== Jaipur Metro Project ===
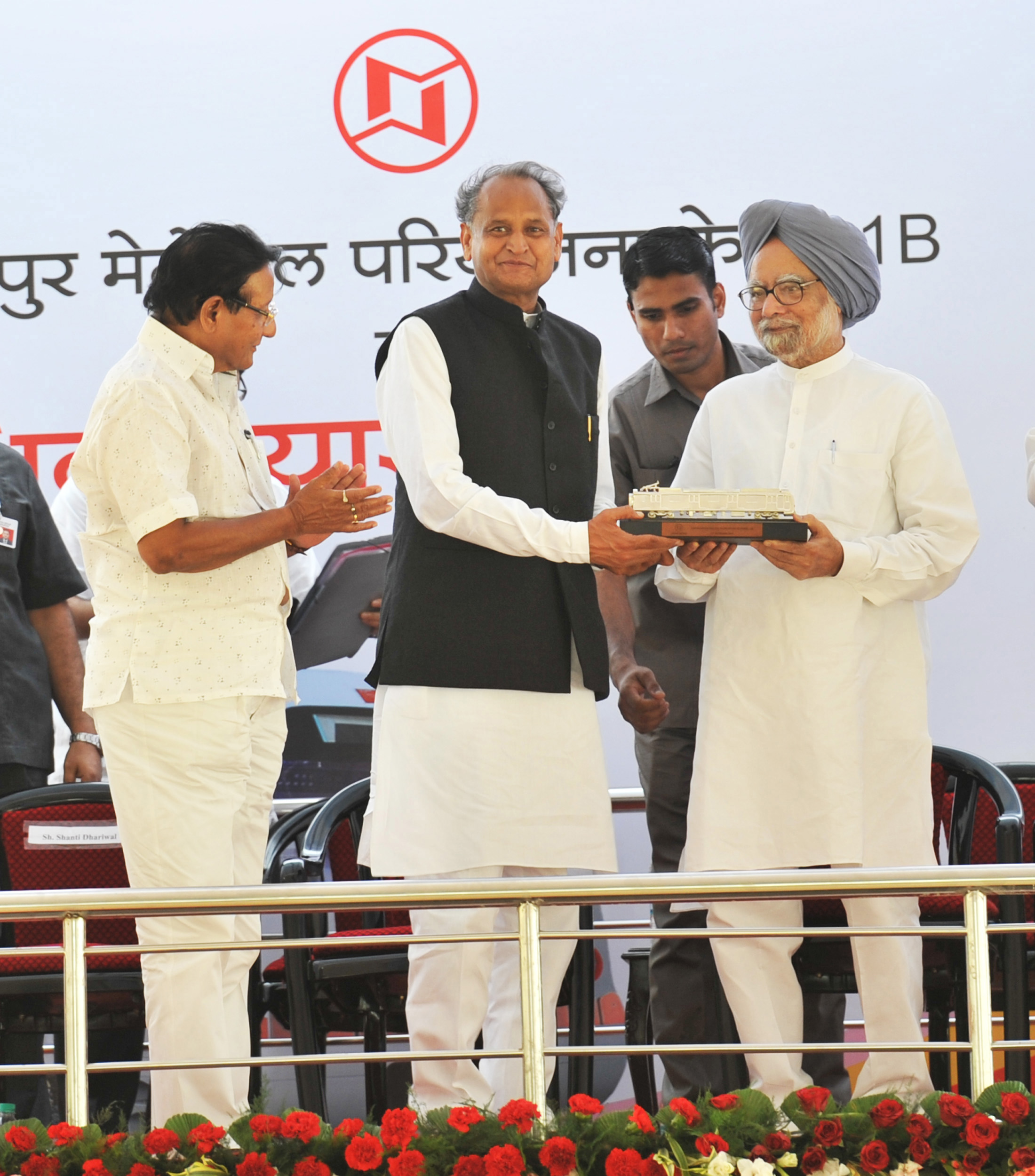
Manmohan Singh being presented a memento by the Chief Minister of Rajasthan, Ashok Gehlot, at the foundation stone laying ceremony of Phase-1B of Jaipur Metro, at Jaipur, Rajasthan on 21 September 2013.

In 2013, Gehlot also inaugurated the Jaipur Metro Project for bringing efficient transport infrastructure in the state of Rajasthan. The phase I-A of the project was laid down from Mansarovar to Chandpole, while the phase I-B was laid between Chandpole to Badi Chaupar.

=== Kamdhenu Pashu Bima Yojna ===
On 12 April 2023, Gehlot launched Kamdhenu Pashu Bima Yojna, an insurance scheme for the dairy animals for the resident cattle owners of Rajasthan. Under this scheme, a farmer needs to have at least two dairy animal and his annual income shouldn't exceed eight lakh per annum for becoming a beneficiary. The government of Rajasthan also made this scheme available to the farmers having more than eight lacs as annual income, but in that case, they had to pay an annual premium of ₹200. The eligible beneficiaries were required to register for the scheme at their nearest Mehngai Rahat Camp (Inflation relief camps). Gehlot also organised the video conferences to connect directly with the people in order to make them aware of the scheme. As per provision of this scheme, on the death of milch animal a compensation of ₹40,000 was announced to be provided per animal to the cattle owner as insurance claim. The scheme was made available to two animals per family, taking total benefits to ₹ 80,000. This scheme, like many others were distributed at the instance of Gehlot through 2,500 Inflation relief camps running across the state, aiming to deliver ten flagship scheme of Gehlot's government to people.

=== Law and order related reforms ===
In 2019, Gehlot chaired a meeting of Rajasthan's home department. The questions that were discussed in this meeting included turning down of the registration of new First Information Reports by the Station House Officers in many instances to keep the crime figure in the state low, apparently. Gehlot announced that in such cases, where a police official in charge has not registered an FIR on the complaint, the complainant can lodge his grievance against the official on a special portal of the government launched for keeping the police officials accountable. The SHO or the officer in charge will have to mandatorily register FIR for all the congnisable offences and if they fail to do so, required action will be taken against them. Gehlot also announced the roadmap to recruit more manpower in the police department and immediate promotion of the constables and other staff that was due for the time. This was done to enhance the pace of investigation and inquiry in the cases which were about to come after the enforcement of mandatory registration of FIR.

During his tenure, Gehlot also prioritised checking of crime against women. In 2023, the Government of Rajasthan brought a policy to debar those committing crimes against women from the government jobs by issuing a character certificate mentioning the type of crime they committed and keeping a record of hooligans by the police department of the state, to be shared with the Staff Selection Commission and State Public Service Commission.

== Leadership ==
Gehlot is known for his political acumen and most often, he is referred to as magician (jadugar) by his party colleagues. In 2022, Gehlot was reported to have ensured victory of three Indian National Congress candidates in Rajya Sabha polls, which were being conducted on four seats in the state. While ensuring that horse trading couldn't happen, he also cornered votes of some of the independent electors, who didn't share affiliation with any political party, to vote in favour of Congress candidates. Pramod Tiwari, the Rajya Sabha member from Rajasthan, credited Gehlot for his political acumen after his victory in 2022 polls. In 2023, prior to Rajasthan Legislative Assembly elections, Gehlot claimed in a public address at Dholpur, that three Bharatiya Janata Party MLAs, which included former Chief Minister of Rajasthan, Vasundhara Raje and Dholpur MLA, Shobha Rani Kushwaha, helped him save his government from being toppled down in 2020, by some rebel leaders of his own party. However, Raje responded to Gehlot's claim by accusing him of plotting conspiracy against her to create distrust between herself and BJP leadership of state. Gehlot's first stint as Chief Minister was witnessed in 1998, the year, which also saw rise of Sonia Gandhi to the presidency of Indian National Congress. In the election held that year, Jat community is reported to have thrown its weight behind Indian National Congress, as the face of party was veteran leader Parasram Maderna, a member of Jat community. Maderna was also one of the contender for the post of Chief Minister then and Jat community had supported Congress, in a bid to get a Chief Minister from their own community. However, Gehlot was able to sideline Maderna, to create a space for him for the premiership of state. Decades later, Gehlot faced similar situation in his political career, when next generation Congress leader, Sachin Pilot opposed him and tried to assume leadership, like Gehlot did to Maderna. However, according to senior journalist and political analyst, Rajendra Bora: " It was Gehlot's political manoeuvre, which helped him save his position, and he refused to give way to next generation leaders to rise up in state politics." It is opined by political analysts that post his rise in Rajasthan as face of Indian National Congress, Gehlot never allowed alternative leadership to develop in the party.

Veteran journalist and political analyst, Narayan Bareth believes that Gehlot is considered as their biggest political adversary by the Jat leadership of the state of Rajasthan. Ever since his appointment as Chief Minister of State, the political future of two biggest Jat families, which had considerable say in the state's politics, was foredoomed. The Mirdha and Maderna political families, which belonged to Jat community were reduced to insignificant position in the politics of state. While the Mirdhas over the time became non important political entity, Maderna family's political clout was destroyed due to Mahipal Maderna's sex scandal, after which he was sacked from ministry by Gehlot. Gehlot however claims that he has no role in political future of Jat leadership of state. It is also admitted by some political analysts that Gehlot, besides playing political manoeuvre, is apt at handing the crisis situation through deliberations. During Gurjar agitation in state, when Gurjar leader Kirori Singh Bainsla came to meet him, Gehlot gave him a portrait of Martin Luther King and persuaded him that the law and order situation shouldn't be distributed during the agitation. It is also alleged that in the Bhanwari Devi murder case, despite knowing that she was blackmailing the Water Resource minister of state, Mahipal Maderna, Gehlot didn't take any step, which resulted in murder of Devi and Maderna along with other convicts were sacked; his conviction, further led to fall in his political graph. Gehlot's political opponent, Vasundhara Raje have also exploited the anguish of Jats against him, as Raje herself is married into Dholpur royal family, which belonged to Jats. It is opined that Congress failed to repeat the electoral victory like 1998 as the support of Jat community to it ceased to exist like earlier, due to Gehlot becoming the Chief Minister in 1998, after sidelining Parasram Maderna.

Gehlot was also able to save his government from being toppled down by rebellion of some of the Congress MLAs, who were considered as loyal to Sachin Pilot, when Pilot claimed in 2020 that Gehlot's government was in minority. In what is called as Rajasthan Political Crisis of 2020, Deputy Chief Minister of Rajasthan, and a colleague of Ashok Gehlot, Sachin Pilot rushed to Delhi, claiming to have support of thirty MLAs. The MLAs of Pilot faction of Congress claimed that Gehlot wanted to oust Pilot from all significant positions, he is holding in Congress party. The Congress leadership, in response to Pilot's activities issued whip and called a meeting of Congress Legislature Party in Jaipur. Pilot, however, refused to attend the meeting, showing complete distrust in Gehlot's leadership. It was later revealed that only twelve MLAs were present in Pilot's camp in Delhi and soon after latter's claim of having support of thirty MLAs, Congress claimed that 109 MLAs have submitted their written consent in favour of Gehlot.

Despite opposition in several corners of the state by several influential communities, Gehlot himself believes that he served as the chief minister for three terms because of the support of all the communities of Rajasthan. Speaking to a gathering in 2022, in Bharatpur district, he said:

If all the communities do not love me, do not bless me, then how can I be made the chief minister 3 times… and the biggest thing is that my caste is called Saini, it is called Kushwaha, it is called Mali.” “There is only one MLA of my caste in the assembly, and that is myself… Sometimes, I think that what a lucky person I am, I am so fortunate that the people of Rajasthan have made me chief minister thrice.

== Positions held ==
Year	Position
1980–84	Elected to the 7th Lok Sabha: Member – Public Accounts Committee 1980–82; Deputy Minister for Tourism 1982–84; Deputy Minister for Civil Aviation 1982–83; Deputy Minister for Sports 1984–84
1984–89	Elected to the 8th Lok Sabha: Union Minister of State for Tourism 1984–85; Union Minister of State for Civil Aviation 1984–85
1991–96	Elected to the 10th Lok Sabha: Minister of State (Independent Charge) for Textiles 1991–93; Member – Consultative Committee on Communication 1991–96; Member – Standing Committee on Railway 1991–96
1996–98	Elected to the 11th Lok Sabha: Member – Standing Committee on Railway 1996–98; Member – Consultative Committee on Communication 1996–98
1998–99	Elected to the 12th Lok Sabha
1999–2003	Member, 11th Rajasthan Legislative Assembly (Elected in by-election): Chief Minister of Rajasthan
2003–08	Member, 12th Rajasthan Legislative Assembly
2008–13	Member, 13th Rajasthan Legislative Assembly: Chief Minister of Rajasthan
2013–18	Member, 14th Rajasthan Legislative Assembly
2018–2023	Member, 15th Rajasthan Legislative Assembly: Chief Minister of Rajasthan
2023–Cont.	Member, 16th Rajasthan Legislative Assembly

=== Other positions held ===
Year	Position
1974–79	State President, Rajasthan NSUI
1979–82	President, City District Congress Committee, Jodhpur
1982	General Secretary, Rajasthan Pradesh Congress Committee
1985–89	President, Rajasthan Pradesh Congress Committee
1994–97	President, Rajasthan Pradesh Congress Committee
1997–99	President, Rajasthan Pradesh Congress Committee
2004–08	General Secretary, All India Congress Committee
2017–2019	General Secretary, All India Congress Committee

== See also ==
- Upendra Kushwaha
- Keshav Prasad Maurya
- Nayab Singh Saini
- Samrat Chaudhary
- Chhagan Bhujbal

Lok Sabha
Preceded by R D Gattani	Member of Parliament for Jodhpur; 1980–1989	Succeeded by Jaswant Singh
Preceded by Jaswant Singh	Member of Parliament for Jodhpur; 1991–1999	Succeeded by Jaswant Singh Bishnoi
Political offices
Preceded by Bhairon Singh Shekhawat	Chief Minister of Rajasthan; 1 December 1998 – 8 December 2003	Succeeded by Vasundhara Raje Scindia
Preceded by Vasundhara Raje Scindia	Chief Minister of Rajasthan; 12 December 2008 – 13 December 2013	Succeeded by Vasundhara Raje Scindia
Preceded by Vasundhara Raje Scindia	Chief Minister of Rajasthan; 17 December 2018 – 15 December 2023	Succeeded by Bhajan Lal Sharma
