= Malkhan Singh Bishnoi =

Indian politician from Rajasthan

Member of 13th Rajasthan Legislative Assembly
- In office 2008 – 2013
- Constituency: Luni

Personal details
- Party: Indian National Congress
- Spouse: Kamla Vishnoi
- Children: 5 Sons & 1 Daughter
- Parent: Ram Singh Bishnoi Amri Devi
- Education: M.A. (Political Science)
- Alma mater: JNVU Jodhpur

Malkhan Singh Bishnoi is an Indian politician. He was an MLA from Luni constituency from Jodhpur Rajasthan.
