= Ansari (surname) =

Ansari or Al Ansari is a typically Muslim surname mainly found in the Middle East and South Asia. People with the surname Al-Ansari or Ansari are said to be the descendants of the Ansar tribesmen of Medina. Notable Ansaris include:

== A–K ==
- Abbas Ansari (born 1992), Indian sportsman and shooter
- Abu Ayyub al-Ansari (died c. 674), standard-bearer of the Prophet Muhammad
- Abdolreza Ansari (1925–2020), Iranian politician
- Abdulaziz Rashid Al Ansari (born 1992), Qatari footballer
- Abdul Haq Ansari (1931–2012), Indian Islamic philosopher
- Abdul Qaiyum Ansari (1905–1973), Indian active in the freedom struggle of India
- Abdur Razzaque Ansari, Indian Muslim nationalist, freedom fighter, and a weavers revolution leader
- Afzal Ansari (born 1953), Indian politician
- Akbar Ansari (born 1988), English cricketer of Pakistani descent
- Akram Ansari (born 1954), Pakistani politician
- Ali Ansari (actor) (born 1987), Pakistani actor and musician
- Ali Ansari (banker) (born 1962), Iranian banker and businessman
- Ali M. Ansari (born 1967), Iranian-British history professor
- Ali Al Ansari, Emirati paralympic athlete
- Allama Mustafa Hussain Ansari, (1945–2006), Kashmiri writer and public speaker
- Amir Ansari (born 1970), American businessman and entrepreneur of Iranian descent
- Anousheh Ansari (born 1966), Iranian-American engineer, businesswoman and entrepreneur
- Asad Ansari, Pakistani-Canadian accused of terrorism
- Aziz Ansari (born 1983), American actor, comedian, writer, producer, and director
- Bushra Ansari, Pakistani television presenter, comedian, singer, actress and playwright
- Doris Ansari, British politician and former chair of Cornwall County Council
- Faheem Ansari, Indian national who was charged with involvement in the 2008 Mumbai attacks
- Fahad Al Ansari (born 1987), Kuwaiti footballer
- Faridul Haq Ansari (1895–1966), Indian attorney active in the Indian independence movement
- Faris Muslim al Ansari (born 1984), Afghan held in Guantanamo
- Farzaneh Ansari (born 19..), Iranian politician
- Furqan Ansari (born 1948), Indian politician
- Iftikhar Hussain Ansari (1936–2014), Kashmiri Shia cleric and politician
- Imran Raza Ansari (born 1972), Kashmiri Shia cleric and politician
- Furkan Ansari (born 1948), Indian politician
- Gholamreza Ansari (born 1956), Iranian politician
- Hamid Ansari (born 1937), former Vice President of India
- Jaber Ansari (born 1987), Iranian footballer
- Jamshed Ansari (1942–2005), Pakistani film, television and radio actor
- Jamshid Ansari (born 1954), Iranian politician
- Karim Ansarifard (born 1990), Iranian footballer
- Khalid A. H. Ansari, Indian entrepreneur, journalist
- Khizar Humayun Ansari, British race relations academic

== M–Z ==
- Majed al-Ansari, Qatari government advisor and spokesperson
- Majid Ansari (born 1954), Iranian cleric and politician
- Mariam Ansari, Pakistani actress
- Maryam Afifa Ansari, Indian neurosurgeon
- Master Taj-ud-Din Ansari, Pakistani politician
- Mateen Ansari (1916–1943), Indian soldier in British army
- Maulana Mohammad Abbas Ansari (1936–2022), Shiite Muslim leader in Jammu and Kashmir
- Maulana Masroor Abbas Ansari (born 1975), Shia Religious leader in Jammu and Kashmir
- Mehdi Siraj Ansari (1895–1961), Islamic writer
- Mohammad Ansari (disambiguation), a number of people
- Mujib Rahman Ansari (1982–2022), Afghan mullah
- Mukhtar Ansari, Indian gangster turned politician
- Mukhtar Ahmed Ansari (1880–1936), Indian nationalist and political leader
- Mustafa al-Ansari, Saudi accused of terrorism
- Murtadha Ansari (1781–1864), Iranian Arab Islamic scholar
- Nazenin Ansari, Iranian journalist in exile
- Noushafarin Ansari (born 1939), Indian-born Iranian librarian, educator and manager
- Rais Ansari, Urdu Indian poet
- Sahar Ansari (born 1939), Pakistani Urdu poet, critic and scholar
- Salim Miya Ansari, Nepalese politician
- Saman Ansari (born 1974), Pakistani television actress
- Sarah Ansari, British professor of history
- Shaukatullah Shah Ansari (1908–1972), Indian politician
- Sheikh Sadiq Ali Ansari (active 1901), Indian politician
- Shina Ansari (born 1972), Iranian politician
- Siamak Ansari (born 1968), Iranian television actor and director
- Sibakatullah Ansari, Indian politician
- S.M.Razaullah Ansari (1932–2023), Indian physicist
- Talal Al-Ansari (born 1996), Kuwaiti football player
- Yassamin Ansari (born 1992), American activist and politician
- Zabiuddin Ansari a.k.a. Abu Hamza or Abu Jundal, an Indian national, accused of being involved in 2008 Mumbai attacks
- Zafar Ansari (born 1991), English cricketer of Pakistani descent
- Zafar Ishaq Ansari (1932–2016), Pakistani scholar of Islamic Studies
- Zeeshan Ansari (born 1999), Indian cricketer
- Zohra Ansari (1915–1988), Indian independence activist
