= Political families of Uttar Pradesh =

List of Indian political families based in UP

The partial list of political families of Uttar Pradesh state of India and their notable members:

== The Ansari Family ==
- Mukhtar Ahmed Ansari, former President of Indian National Congress (1927–1928) and former President of All India Muslim League (1920–1921).
  - Zohra Ansari, (1915–1988) was an Indian activist and freedom fighter. (Daughter of Mukhtar Ahmed Ansari)
- Subhanullah Ansari, Leader of Communist Party of India (CPI)
    - Afzal Ansari, Lok Sabha MP of Ghazipur (son of Subhanullah)
    - Sibgatullah Ansari, MLA of Mohammadabad (2007–2017) (son of Subhanullah)
      - Suhaib Ansari, MLA of Mohammadabad (2022–Present) (son of Sibgatullah)
    - Mukhtar Ansari, MLA of Mau (1996–2022) (son of Subhanullah)
      - Abbas Ansari, MLA of Mau (2022–Present) (son of Mukhtar Ansari)
  - Abdul Aziz Ansari (nephew of Mukhtar Ahmed Ansari)
    - Hamid Ansari, former Vice President of India (2007–2017) (grand-nephew of Mukhtar Ahmed Ansari) and (2nd cousin of Afzal, Sibgatullah and Mukhtar Ansari)
  - Faridul Haq Ansari, a lawyer and politician who actively participated in the Indian independence movement

== The Bhadri Family ==
- Rai Bajrang Bahadur Singh, former Lieutenant Governor of Himachal Pradesh (1955–1963); (He had no child)
  - Uday Pratap Singh (adopted son of Bajrang Bahadur Singh)
    - Raghuraj Pratap Singh (Raja Bhaiya), Founder of Jansatta Dal Loktantrik, former Cabinet Minister In Government of UP, MLA From Kunda (son of Uday Pratap Singh)

Note: The Bhadri family belong to the Royal family of Oudh.

== The Chaudhary Family ==
- Ch Badam Singh Tewatiya of Sihi Village (Grandfather of Ch Charan Singh) - Cousin of Raja Nahar Singh of princely state Ballabgarh
  - Om Prakash Jatrana (Uncle of Gayatri Devi) - MLA 1977 Rohat (Sonipat) & Minister
    - Chaudhary Charan Singh Tewatiya, former Prime Minister of India (1979–1980) and former Chief Minister of UP (1967-1968 and Feb to Oct 1970)
    - Gayatri Devi Jat Rana (wife) MLA Iglas (Aligarh) 1969, MLA Gokul (Mathura) 1974 and Lok Sabha MP Kairana 1980
      - Dr. Gyanwati Singh Tomar nee Tewatiya (Daughter) MLA - Iglas (Aligarh) 1991 and Khair (Aligarh) 1996
      - Saroj Verma nee Tewatiya (Daughter) MLA Chhaprali Baghpat 1985
      - Guru Dutt Solanki (son-in-law) MLA Kheragarh (Agra) 1977
      - Chaudhary Ajit Singh, founder of Rashtriya Lok Dal (RLD), former Lok Sabha MP of Baghpat and former Union Minister of India four times - 1989 Industry, 1995 Food, 2001 Agriculture & 2011 Civil Aviation (son of Charan Singh)
        - Jayant Chaudhary, present Chairman of RLD and Rajya Sabha MP (2022–Present); Lok Sabha MP of Mathura (2009–2014); MLA Mant 2012; Union Minister of State (Independent Charge) for Skill Development & Entrepreneurship & Union Minister of State for Education (grandson of Charan Singh)

== The Chauhan (Narain) Family ==
- Narain Singh, 1st Deputy Chief Minister of Uttar Pradesh
  - Sanjay Singh Chauhan, former MP of Bijnor. (son of Narain Singh)

== The Hasan Family ==
- Akhtar Hasan, former Lok Sabha MP of Kairana (1984–1989) (father of Munawwar)
  - Chaudhary Munawwar Hasan, former Lok Sabha MP of Kairana and Muzaffarnagar; former Rajya Sabha MP (1998–2003).
  - Begum Tabassum Hasan, former MP of Kairana (2009–2014, 2018–2019), (wife of Munawwar)
    - Nahid Hasan, MLA of Kairana (2014–Present) (son of Munawwar)
    - Iqra Choudhary, Lok Sabha MP of Kairana (daughter of Munawwar)

Note: Hasan Family is a Muslim Gurjar family from Kairana, Uttar Pradesh in India.

== The Khan family ==
- Azam Khan, former Leader of the Opposition of UP Legislative Assembly; former Cabinet Minister in Government of UP; former Lok Sabha MP (2019–2022) and Rajya Sabha MP; 10 term MLA of Rampur
- Tazeen Fatma, former MP of Rajya Sabha (2014–2019); former MLA of Rampur (wife of Azam Khan)
  - Abdullah Azam Khan, MLA of Suar (2017–Present) (son of Azam Khan)

== The Khan-Hussain family ==
- Dr. Zakir Husain Khan, (8 February 1897 – 3 May 1969) was an Indian educationist and politician who served as the 2nd Vice President of India from 1962 to 1967 and 3rd president of India from 13 May 1967 until his death on 3 May 1969.
- Mahmud Husain Khan, (5 July 1907 – 12 April 1975) was a Pakistani historian, educationist, and politician, known for his role in the Pakistan Movement, and for pioneering the study of social sciences.
- General Rahimuddin Khan, was a general of the Pakistan Army who served as the 4th Chairman Joint Chiefs of Staff Committee from 1984 to 1987
- Khurshed Alam Khan, former External Affairs Minister of India and former Governor of Karnataka and Goa. (son-in-law of Dr. Zakir Hussain).
  - Salman Khurshid, former External Affairs and Minority Affairs Minister of India and former MP from Farrukhabad (son of Khurshed Alam Khan).

== The Masood Family ==
- Rasheed Masood, 5 time Lok Sabha MP from Saharanpur, former Minister of Health
  - Shahjan Masood, Lok Sabha candidate from Samajwadi Party for Saharanpur (2014) and Kairana (2009)
  - Imran Masood, Lok Sabha MP from Saharanpur, former MLA of Muzaffarabad (2007–2012), (nephew of Rasheed Masood)

== The Singh (Kalyan) Family ==
- Kalyan Singh, former Chief Minister of Uttar Pradesh and former Governor of Rajasthan
  - Rajveer Singh, Lok Sabha MP of Etah since 2014 (son of Kalyan Singh)
    - Sandeep Kumar Singh Lodhi, MLA of Atrauli (2017–Present) and Minister of Basic Education (2022–Present) in Government of UP. (grandson of Kalyan Singh)

== The Singh (Rajnath) Family ==
- Rajnath Singh, Defence Minister of India (2019–Present) and former Chief Minister of Uttar Pradesh (2000–2002).
  - Pankaj Singh, MLA of Noida (2017–Present) (son of Rajnath Singh).
  - Neeraj Singh (son of Rajnath Singh)

== The Singh (Anand) Family (Royal Family of Mankapur) ==
- Raja Anand Singh, Agriculture Minister of Uttar Pradesh (2012–2017), and former 4 time Member of Lok Sabha from Gonda. Also served 3 terms as MLA from Gaura (Married to Veena Singh)
  - Kirti Vardhan Singh, Union Minister of State For External Affairs and Environment, Forest and Climate Change (2024–present) and 5 time Member of the Lok Sabha (son of Anand Singh)
  - Bindumati Devi, Member of Rajya Sabha (1967–1972), and Member of Uttar Pradesh Legislative Assembly (1957–1962) (mother in law of Anand Singh)
  - Raja Raghuraj Singh, OBE, Raja Saheb of Mankapur
  - Niharika Singh (Daughter of Anand Singh)
  - Shivani Singh (Daughter of Anand Singh)
  - Radhka Singh (Daughter of Anand Singh)

Note: The Singh Family belongs To Mankapur Royal Family

== The Yadav Family ==
The Yadav family is extended family of Samajwadi party leader Mulayam Singh Yadav, family lines of his 4 brothers and 1 cousin brother.

- Sughar Singh Yadav (father of Mulayam)
  - Mulayam Singh Yadav, Founder of Samajwadi Party, former Chief Minister of UP (2003–2007) and former Defence Minister of India.
    - Akhilesh Yadav, Lok Sabha MP of Kannauj, former Chief Minister of UP (2012–2017) (son of Mulayam)
    - Dimple Yadav, Lok Sabha MP of Mainpuri, former MP of Kannauj (2012–2019) (wife of Akhilesh)
    - Prateek Yadav, businessman (step-son of Mulayam) and (step-brother of Akhilesh). He died on May 13, 2026, due to massive pulmonary embolism.
    - Aparna Yadav (wife of Prateek)
  - Abhay Ram Yadav (brother of Mulayam)
    - Dharmendra Yadav, Lok Sabha MP of Azamgarh (2024–present), former MP of Badaun (2004–2019) (son of Abhay Ram) (nephew of Mulayam)
      - Vandana Yadav, former chairperson of Hamirpur zila Panchayat (Sister-in-law of Dharmendra Yadav)
    - Anurag Yadav, (nephew of Mulayam)
    - Sandhya Yadav, former Chairperson of Mainpuri Zila Panchayat, (daughter of Abhay Ram) and (niece of Mulayam)
    - Sheela Yadav, Zila Panchayat member, (niece of Mulayam) her son Rahul Yadav is married to Isha Yadav (daughter of Sadhu Yadav)
      - Rahul Yadav, (son of Jitendra Yadav former MLC from the Samajwadi Party). Jitendra is the nephew of former MP D. P. Yadav
  - Rajpal Singh Yadav, (brother of Mulayam)
  - Premlata Yadav, former Chairperson of Etawah Zila Panchayat (2006–2016); (wife of Rajpal) and (sister-in-law of Mulayam)
    - Abhishek Yadav (Anshul), present Chairman of Etawah Zila Panchayat (2016–Present) (son of Rajpal), (nephew of Mulayam) and (cousin of Akhilesh).
    - Aryan Yadav (son of Rajpal Yadav) (nephew of Mulayam) and (cousin of Akhilesh)
  - Shivpal Singh Yadav (youngest brother of Mulayam), MLA of Jaswantnagar; former PWD Minister in Government of UP
  - Sarla Yadav, former chairperson of Etawah Cooperative Bank (Wife of Shivpal Singh Yadav)
    - Dr.Anubha Yadav, wife of Ajay Yadav (IAS), (daughter of Shivpal)
    - Aditya Yadav(Ankur Yadav) Lok Sabha MP of Badaun (son of Shivpal) and (nephew of Mulayam)
  - Ajant Singh Yadav (brother-in-law of Mulayam), Block Vikas Parishad, Etawah
  - Ratan Singh Yadav (elder brother of Mulayam)
    - Ranvir Singh Yadav, former Block Pramukh of Saifai block (son of Ratan Singh) (nephew of Mulayam)
    - Mridula Yadav, Block Pramukh of Saifai block (2016–Present) (wife of Ranvir) and (mother of Tej Pratap)
      - Tej Pratap Singh Yadav, former Lok Sabha MP of Mainpuri (2014–2019), (grand-nephew of Mulayam), (nephew of Akhilesh) and (son-in-law of Lalu)
      - Raj Lakshmi Yadav, (wife of Tej Pratap Singh Yadav) and (daughter of Lalu Prasad Yadav)
- Bachchi Lal Yadav, (brother of Sughar Yadav) and (uncle of Mulayam)
  - Ram Gopal Yadav, Rajya Sabha MP (1992–2004, 2008–Present) (cousin of Mulayam) and (son of Bachchi Lal)
    - Akshay Yadav, Lok Sabha MP of Firozabad (son of Ram Gopal)
  - Geeta Devi, (cousin of Mulayam)
    - Arvind Pratap, former MLC (2016–2022)

Family tree of Mulayam Singh Yadav

Mewa Ram Yadav (grand father)
Murti Devi (Mother) | Sughar Singh Yadav (Father) | Bachchi Lal Yadav (uncle)
Ratan Singh Yadav (elder brother) | Mulayam Singh Yadav | Abhay Ram Yadav (younger brother) | Rajpal Singh Yadav (younger brother) | Shivpal Singh Yadav (youngest brother) | Kamla Devi (sister) | Ram Gopal Yadav (cousin) | Geeta Devi (cousin)
Ranvir Singh Yadav (nephew) | Akhilesh Yadav (son) | Dharmendra Yadav (nephew) | Aditya Yadav | Akshay Yadav | Arvind Pratap
Tej Pratap Singh Yadav (grand nephew)

== See also ==
- Political families of India
