= Munna Bajrangi =

Indian criminal and politician (1967–2018)

- Munna (center)
- Born: 2 June 1967; Jaunpur, Uttar Pradesh, India
- Died: 9 July 2018 (aged 51); Baghpat, Uttar Pradesh, India
- Cause of death: Gunshot wounds
- Other name: Prem Prakash Singh
- Occupation: Politician
- Criminal charges: Murder, attempt to murder and extortion
- Spouse: Seema Singh
- Children: 2
- Father: Paras Nath

Munna Bajrangi or Prem Prakash Singh (2 June 1967 – 9 July 2018) was an Indian politician, a known contract killer and a gang leader from Eastern Uttar Pradesh. In the two decades he was active, he is associated with more than 40 incidents such as murder, attempted murder, and extortion. In 2009, he was jailed for the murder of MLA Krishnanand Rai in 2005 and another BJP leader Ramchandra Singh. For many years, he supported the Samajwadi Party headed by Mulayam Singh Yadav, but the gang switched to Mayawati's Bahujan Samaj Party in the mid-2000s.

He fought elections while imprisoned in Tihar jail under Apna Dal and Peace Party of India in 2012 as trial proceedings were going on. He was shot dead at the District Jail in Baghpat, Uttar Pradesh, on 9 July 2018. He was shot ten times in the head within the jail premises by another prisoner, gangster Sunil Rathi. His death came a week after his wife, Seema Singh, said in a press conference that he would be targeted.

== Criminal career ==
Munna Bajrangi was initially a carpet weaver. After a few independent killings, the first at the age of 17, he committed the first murder. he joined a gang in Uttar Pradesh led by Gajraj Singh. In an atmosphere where the moves of criminals becoming politicians was pioneered by gangsters like Raja Bhaiyya, DP Yadav and others, Bajrangi started his criminal career as a member of criminal-politician Mukhtar Ansari's gang. In the early 1990s, under the governance of Mulayam Singh Yadav's Samajwadi Party, criminals were flourishing in UP. In 1996, Mukhtar was elected from Mau, and the gang, with its arsenal of AK 47and other weapons, became a household name in the districts of Bhadohi Mau, Ghazipur, Varanasi and Jaunpur. The gangs made a living by garnering government contracts with political help.

They soon came into conflict with Brijesh Singh, another established ganglord who worked together with politician Krishnanand Rai of the Bharatiya Janata Party. In 2001, Brijesh Singh's gang ambushed the Mukhtar Ansari gang on the Mau-Lucknow highway; three people died from each mafia gang.

In the 2002 elections, Mukhtar's brother Afzal Ansari, who had won from Mohammadabad in five earlier elections, was defeated by Krishnanand Rai, a rival politician supported by the Bharatiya Janata Party.

On the afternoon of November 2005, Rai was travelling with six aides when they were attacked by seven gangsters in a Tata Sumo. Bajrangi along with associates Firdaus, were Ata-ur-Rahman alias Babu, and Aijazul Haque were identified by some survivors. CBI later identified Vishwas Nepali, Sanjeev Maheshwari, Rakesh Pandey and Ramu Mallah as the other members of the attacking team. Over 400 bullets were fired from six AK-47 rifles, killing Rai and all others travelling in two Qualises. 67 bullets were recovered from seven bodies. A police officer called it the largest "display of firepower" in an Uttar Pradesh mafia battle. Since then, Bajrangi was on the police's most wanted list.

In 2009, after announcing a cash reward of Rs.700,000, Bajrangi was arrested against from the Siddivinayak Residential Society in Mumbai's Malad area. He had been living in the apartment under his real name, Prem Prakash Singh, along with his wife and three teenaged children since 2003.

== Politics ==
In 2012, while imprisoned in Tihar jail with the trial proceeding ongoing, Bajrangi fought in the 2012 Uttar Pradesh Legislative elections from Mariyahu as a joint candidate of the Apna Dal and the Peace Party. He came in third, polling 12% behind winner Shraddha Yadav of Samajwadi Party.

== Death ==
Late in the evening at around 9:30 pm, on Sunday 8 July 2018, Munna Bajrangi was shifted from Jhansi jail to Baghpat jail, as he was to be produced in court for an extortion case on Monday 9 July 2018. In the early hours of Monday, 9 July 2018, at around 5:30 am he was shot in the head inside the jail premises by an inmate, another gangster named Sunil Rathi. Sunil Rathi alleged that he shot and killed Munna Bajrangi since the latter made comments over his appearance, calling him 'chubby'.

The Chief Minister of Uttar Pradesh, Yogi Adityanath, reacted by ordering a judicial inquiry and suspending jail officials.

== See also ==
- D. P. Yadav
