= Sibgatullah Ansari =

Indian politician

Member (MLA) in Uttar Pradesh Legislative Assembly
- In office 2007–2017
- Preceded by: Alka Rai
- Succeeded by: Alka Rai
- Constituency: Mohammadabad

Personal details
- Born: Sibgatullah Ansari; 1951 (age 74–75) Ghazipur, Uttar Pradesh, India
- Party: Samajwadi Party (2021–present)
- Other political affiliations: Bahujan Samaj Party
- Relations: Abbas Ansari (nephew); Afzal Ansari (brother); Mukhtar Ansari (brother); Mukhtar Ahmed Ansari (grandfather)
- Children: 2 Salman Ansari Suhaib Ansari
- Education: PG College Ghazipur
- Profession: Politician

Sibghatullah Ansari is an Indian politician and a former two-term MLA from the Mohammadabad constituency who is prominently recognized as the eldest brother in the influential Ansari family of eastern Uttar Pradesh.

== Early Life ==
Sibghatullah Ansari is an Indian politician and a former two-term MLA from the Mohammadabad constituency who is prominently recognized as the eldest brother in the influential Ansari family of eastern Uttar Pradesh. Born to Subhanullah Ansari, he inherits a notable nationalist lineage; his grandfather was Dr. Mukhtar Ahmed Ansari, a pioneering freedom fighter who served as the President of the Indian National Congress (1927) and co-founded Jamia Millia Islamia, while his second cousin is the former Vice President of India, Mohammad Hamid Ansari. Raised in Ghazipur alongside his younger brothers, MP Afzal Ansari and the late gangster-politician Mukhtar Ansari, Sibghatullah initially focused on local agrarian affairs and completed his Bachelor of Arts degree in 1975. Unlike his younger siblings, his early life was defined by a quieter, community-oriented profile before he ultimately transitioned into formal electoral politics in 2007.

== Political Career ==
Ansari established a significant political footprint in eastern Uttar Pradesh by serving two terms as a Member of the Legislative Assembly (MLA) representing the Mohammadabad constituency in Ghazipur district. His electoral career began with a victory in the 2007 Uttar Pradesh Assembly elections under the Samajwadi Party (SP) banner. He successfully retained his seat in 2012 as a candidate for the Qaumi Ekta Dal (QED), a regional party co-founded by his brothers to consolidate their localized political influence. Although he suffered an electoral defeat in 2017 after contesting on a Bahujan Samaj Party (BSP) ticket, Ansari maintained his prominent political presence. In August 2021, he officially rejoined the Samajwadi Party ahead of the state elections. Shortly thereafter, the family chose to pass their regional political baton to the next generation, leading Sibghatullah to step back from running so that his son, Suhaib Ansari, could successfully contest and win the Mohammadabad seat under the SP banner in 2022.

== Positions held ==
Sibgatullah Ansari has been elected 2 times as MLA.

#	From	To	Position	Party
1.	2007	2012	MLA (1st term) from Mohammadabad	SP
2.	2012	2017	MLA (2nd term) from Mohammadabad	QED

== See also ==
- Mukhtar Ansari
- Afzal Ansari
- Hamid Ansari
- Mukhtar Ahmed Ansari
- Shaukatullah Shah Ansari
- Faridul Haq Ansari
