= Mohammad Usman =

Indian Army Officer

Brigadier Mohammad Usman MVC Haider-e-Nowshera or Nowshera Ka Sher
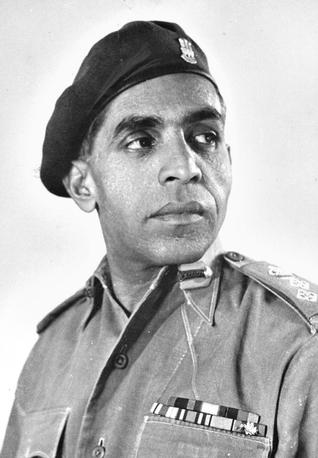
- Born: 15 July 1912; Bibipur (now Mau district), United Provinces, British India
- Died: 3 July 1948 (aged 35); Nowshera, Jammu and Kashmir, India
- Military career
- Allegiance: British India; India
- Branch: British Indian Army; Indian Army
- Service years: 1934–1948
- Rank: Brigadier
- Units: 10th Baluch Regiment; Dogra Regiment
- Commands: 50 Para Brigade; 77 Para Brigade; 14/10 Baluch
- Conflicts: Second Mohmand Campaign; World War II; Indo-Pakistani War of 1947
- Awards: Maha Vir Chakra

Brigadier Mohammad Usman, MVC (15 July 1912 – 3 July 1948) was the highest ranking officer of the Indian Army killed in action during the Indo-Pakistani War of 1947. As a Muslim, Usman became a symbol of India's inclusive secularism. At the time of the partition of India he with many other Muslim officers declined to move to the Pakistan Army and continued to serve with the Indian Army. He was killed in July 1948 while fighting Pakistani soldiers and militia in Jammu and Kashmir. He was later awarded the second highest Indian military decoration for gallantry in the face of enemy, the Maha Vir Chakra.

== Birth and Education ==
Mohammad Usman was born in Bibipur, now Mau (Ghosi Tehsil), Uttar Pradesh, in the United Provinces, British India on 15 July 1912 to Jamilun Bibi and Mohammad Farooq Khunambir. Usman's maternal family was a large land-owning zamindar family from Yusufpur, more commonly known as the Ansaris of Yusufpur. Through this side he was a distant relative of Dr. Mukhtar Ahmed Ansari, Faridul Haq Ansari, Hamid Ansari and Mukhtar Ansari. Usman and his younger brothers, Subhan and Gufran, were educated at Harish Chandra Bhai School, Varanasi. At the age of 12, he jumped into a well to rescue a drowning child.

Usman later decided to join the army, and despite intense competition and the limited opportunities for Indians to get commissions, he succeeded in gaining admission to the prestigious Royal Military Academy Sandhurst (RMAS). He entered RMAS in 1932, was commissioned as a Second Lieutenant and appointed to the Unattached List for the Indian Army on 1 February 1934. He was attached in India to the 1st battalion of the Cameronians on 12 March 1934 for a year.

== Military career ==
At the end of his year with the Cameronians, on 19 March 1935, he was appointed to the Indian Army and posted to the 5th battalion of the 10th Baluch Regiment (5/10 Baluch). Later in the year he saw active service on the North-West Frontier of India during the Mohmand campaign of 1935. He qualified as a 1st class interpreter in Urdu in November 1935.

Usman was promoted to the rank of Lieutenant on 30 April 1936 and Captain on 31 August 1941. From February to July 1942, he attended the Indian Army Staff College at Quetta. By April 1944, he was a temporary Major. He served in Burma and was mentioned in dispatches as a temporary Major in the London Gazette 25 September 1945. He commanded the 14th battalion of the 10th Baluch Regiment (14/10 Baluch) from April 1945 to April 1946.

When the Indian Army was split during the Partition of India, Pakistan offered him the prospect of becoming the army chief in Pakistan. However, he opted to remain in India.

=== Indo-Pakistani War of 1947 ===
In 1947 Pakistan sent tribal irregulars into the princely state of Jammu and Kashmir in an attempt to capture it and accede it to Pakistan. Usman, then commanding the 77th Parachute Brigade, was sent to command the 50th Parachute Brigade, which was deployed at Jhangar in December 1947. On 25 December 1947, with the odds stacked heavily against the brigade, Pakistani forces captured Jhangar. Located at the junction of roads coming from Mirpur and Kotli, Jhangar was of strategic importance. On that day Usman took a vow to recapture Jhangar – a feat he accomplished three months later, but at the cost of his own life.

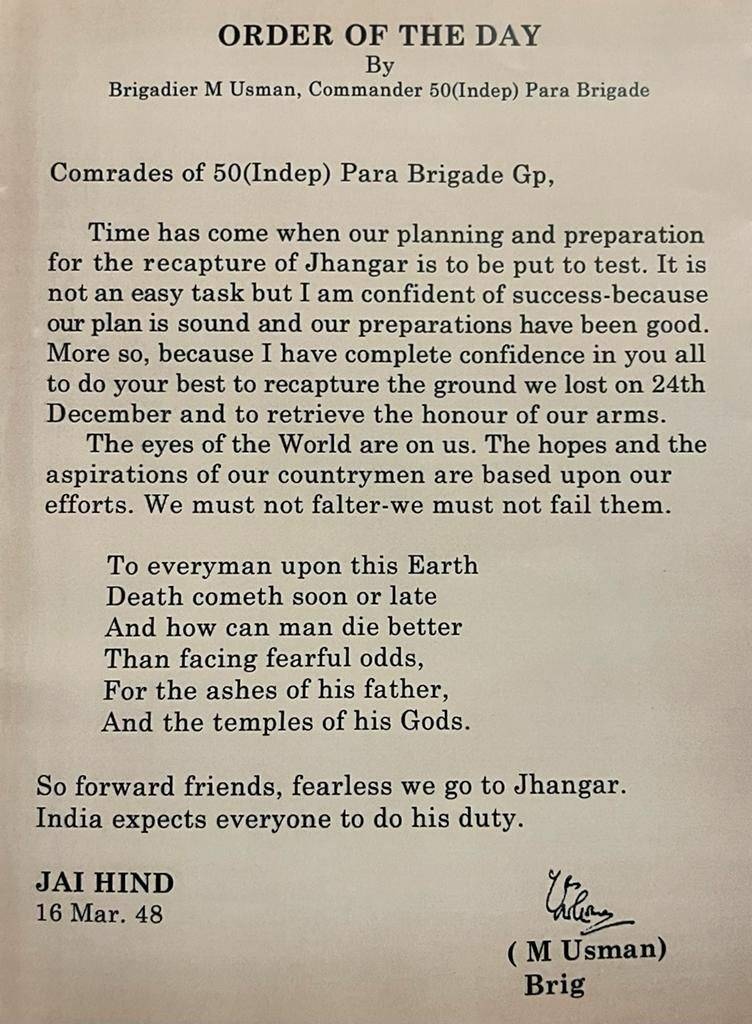
Order of the day by Brigadier M Usman led to a victory ensuring integration of Nowshera & Jhangar with India. Brig M Usman an epitome of valour, led the Battle and dislodged the enemy.

In January–February 1948 Usman repulsed fierce attacks on Nowshera and Jhangar, both highly strategic locations in Jammu and Kashmir. During the defence of Nowshera against overwhelming odds and numbers, Indian forces inflicted around 2000 casualties on the Pakistanis (about 1000 dead and 1000 wounded) while Indian forces suffered only 33 dead and 102 wounded. His defence earned him the nickname Lion of Nowshera. Pakistani forces then announced a sum of Rs 50,000 as a prize for his head. Unaffected by praise and congratulations, Usman continued to sleep on a mat laid on the floor as he had vowed that he would not sleep on a bed till he recaptured Jhangar, from where he had to withdraw in late 1947.

The enemy was eventually driven from the area, and Jhangar was recaptured. Pakistan brought its regular forces into the fray in May 1948. Jhangar was once again subjected to heavy artillery bombardment, and many determined attacks were launched on Jhangar by the Pakistan Army. However, Usman frustrated all their attempts to recapture it. It was during this defence of Jhangar that Usman was martyred on 3 July 1948, by an enemy 25-pounder shell. He was 12 days short of his 36th birthday. His last words were "I am dying but let not the territory we were fighting for fall for the enemy". For his inspiring leadership and great courage, he was awarded the Maha Vir Chakra posthumously.

Indian Prime Minister Jawaharlal Nehru and his Cabinet colleagues attended the funeral of Usman — "the highest ranking military commander till date" to lay down his life in the battlefield. He was given a state funeral of a martyr. An Indian journalist, Khwaja Ahmad Abbas, wrote about his death, "a precious life, of imagination and unswerving patriotism, has fallen a victim to communal fanaticism. Brigadier Usman's brave example will be an abiding source of inspiration for Free India".

== Memorial ==
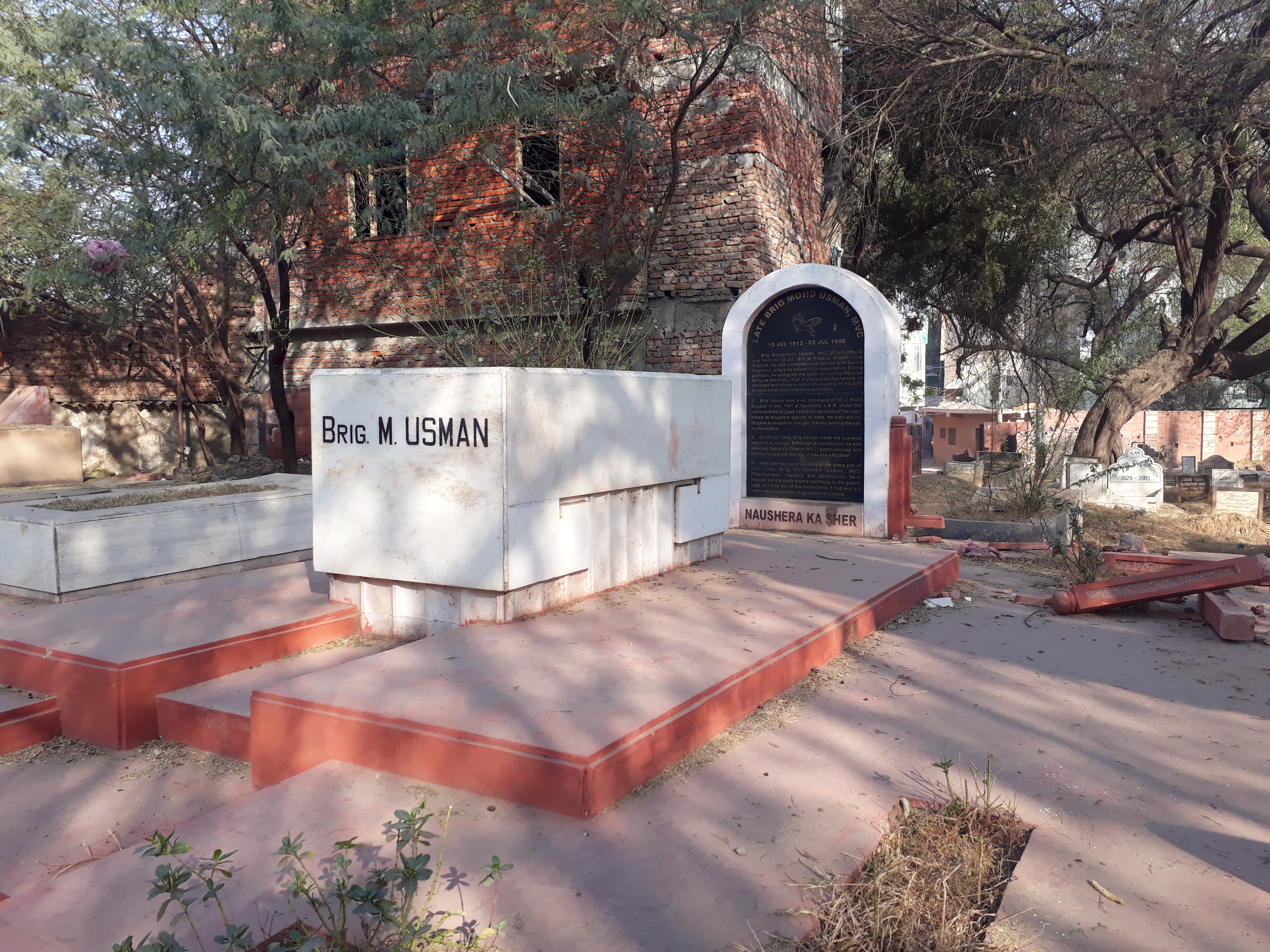
Grave of Mohammad Usman

Usman is buried in the Okhla cemetery near the Jamia Millia Islamia campus in New Delhi. Film directors Ranjan Kumar Singh and Upendra Sood produced a film on Brigadier Usman's life. In 2020, photos of the grave's defaced headstone were widely circulated and triggered outrage on social media. This led several Army veterans to condemn the dishonour done to his memory, ultimately leading the Army to initiate the restoration of the vandalised grave.

His birth centenary was celebrated in 2012 by the Indian Army at Jhangar, Jammu and Kashmir. A Paramotor Expedition was organized by Gorkha Training Centre in the memory of Brigadier Usman.

== See also ==
- Indo-Pakistani War of 1947–1948
- List of recipients of Maha Vir Chakra
- Battle of Nowshera

== Bibliography ==
- Singh, V. K. (2005), Leadership in the Indian Army: Biographies of Twelve Soldiers, SAGE Publications, pp. 160–, ISBN 978-0-7619-3322-9
