= Shailendra =

Shailendra (IAST: Śailendra) is a Sanskrit combined words Śaila and Indra, meaning "King of the Mountain", It is often used as an epithet of the Hindu god Shiva. It is commonly used as a male given name in the Indian subcontinent. Shailendra may refer to:

== People ==
- Shailendra (lyricist) (1923–1966), Indian Hindi-Urdu poet, lyricist and film producer
- Shailendra Gaur, Indian actor
- Shailendra Kumar (born 1960), Samajwadi Party politician from Uttar Pradesh
- Shailendra Kumar Upadhyaya (1929–2011), Nepali politician
- Shailendra Mahato (1929–2011), Jharkhand politician
- Shailendra Mohan Singhal, Bharatiya Janata Party politician from Uttarakhand
- Shailendra Nath Shrivastava (1936–2006), Lok Sabha member from Bihar
- Shailendra Raj Mehta (born 1959), Indian economist
- Shailendra Singh (disambiguation)
  - Shailendra Singh (police officer), Indian former police officer
  - Shailendra Singh (singer) (born 1952), Indian playback singer

== Other ==
- Shailendra dynasty, an influential Indonesian dynasty that emerged in 8th century Java
