= Khojatpur =

Village in Uttar Pradesh, India

Coordinates: 27.738886°N 78.835963°E

Khojatpur is a village in Ambedkar Nagar district, Uttar Pradesh, India. Its post office is in Karampur.
