= Radhe Mohan Singh =

Indian politician

Member of Parliament, Lok Sabha
- In office 2009 - 2014
- Preceded by: Afzal Ansari
- Succeeded by: Manoj Sinha
- Constituency: Ghazipur, Uttar Pradesh

Personal details
- Born: 3 April 1967 (age 59) Village Karampur, Ghazipur, (Uttar Pradesh)
- Died: n/a
- Citizenship: India
- Party: Bharatiya Janata Party
- Spouse: Mrs. Anjana Singh
- Children: Alok K. Singh, Shubham Singh, Aniket Singh
- Parent(s): Lt. Sh. Megh Baran Singh (Father), Lt. Smt. Lalmuni Devi (Mother)
- Education: Lalit Narayan Mithila University
- Profession: Agriculturist, Transporter & Politician
- Committees: Member of several committees

Radhe Mohan Singh is an Indian Politician and is Member of Parliament of the 15th Lok Sabha of India. He represents the Ghazipur constituency of Uttar Pradesh and is a member of the Bharatiya Janata Party political party.

== Early life and education ==
Radhe Mohan Singh was born in village Karampur, Ghazipur district, in the state of Uttar Pradesh. Singh is a graduate and has a B.A degree from Lalit Narayan Mithila University in Bihar. By profession, Singh is an agriculturist and a transporter.

== Political career ==
Singh is a first time M.P. Prior to 2009, he has served as Chairman, Zila Panchyat of Ghazipur.

== Posts held ==
#	From	To	Position
01	2000	2005	Chairman, Zila Panchyat, Ghazipur
02	2009	2014	Member, 15th Lok Sabha
03	2009	2014	Member, Committee on Urban Development
04	2009	2014	Member, Committee on Petroleum

== See also ==
- 15th Lok Sabha
- Politics of India
- Parliament of India
- Government of India
- Samajwadi Party
- Ghazipur (Lok Sabha constituency)
