= Alka Rai =

Indian politician

Member (MLA) in Uttar Pradesh Legislative Assembly
- In office 2017–2022
- Preceded by: Sibakatullah Ansari
- Succeeded by: Suhaib Ansari
- Constituency: Mohammadabad
- In office 2006–2007
- Preceded by: Krishnanand Rai
- Succeeded by: Sibakatullah Ansari
- Constituency: Mohammadabad

Personal details
- Party: Bharatiya Janata Party
- Spouse: Krishnanand Rai
- Occupation: Politician

Alka Rai is an Indian politician. She is a member of the Bharatiya Janata Party (BJP). She served as a member of the Legislative Assembly for the Mohammadabad constituency from 2006 to 2007 and again from 2017 to 2022.

Her husband Krishnanand Rai was allegedly murdered by Mukhtar Ansari however Ansari could not be prosecuted due to witnesses turning hostile. The judgement observed that "the case is another example of prosecution failing due to hostile witnesses. If the witnesses in this case had the benefit of the Witness Protection Scheme, 2018, during trial, the result may have been different."

== Electoral history ==
After her husband's murder, Rai contested the by-polls for Mohammadbad constituency in 2005, winning against Samajwadi Party's Sri Krishnkan Urf Gama Ram. She subsequently lost the 2007 elections against Ansari's brother, Sibagtullah Ansari. She won the seat again in the 2017 elections against Sibagtullah Ansari. In the 2022 elections, she lost the seat to Suhaib Ansari.

== Posts held ==
#	From	To	Position	Comments
01	2006	2007	Member, 14th Legislative Assembly	
01	2017	2022	Member, 17th Legislative Assembly	

== See also ==
- Uttar Pradesh Legislative Assembly
