= Abbas Ansari =

Indian sports shooter, politician

Member of Uttar Pradesh Legislative Assembly
- Incumbent
- Assumed office September 2025
- Preceded by: Vacant
- In office 10 March 2022 – 01 June 2025
- Preceded by: Mukhtar Ansari
- Succeeded by: Expelled from office
- Constituency: Mau

Personal details
- Born: 12 February 1992 (age 34) Uttar Pradesh, India
- Party: Suheldev Bharatiya Samaj Party (2022–present)
- Other political affiliations: Bahujan Samaj Party (before 2022)
- Spouse: Nikhat Bano (m. January 2021)
- Relations: Afzal Ansari (uncle); Sibgatullah Ansari (uncle); Mukhtar Ahmed Ansari (great-Grandfather); Suhaib Ansari (cousin)
- Children: 1
- Parents: Mukhtar Ansari (father); Afsha Ansari (mother)
- Occupation: Politician

Abbas Ansari (born 12 February 1992) is a former Indian national shooter and politician. He is the elder son of Indian gangster turned politician Mukhtar Ansari. He won the 2022 Uttar Pradesh Legislative Assembly election from Mau representing Suheldev Bharatiya Samaj Party. He was later disqualified as MLA after his conviction for the 2022 hate speech case by a special MP-MLA court but later stayed.

== Background ==
The elder son of Indian gangster turned politician Mukhtar Ansari, Abbas Ansari's mother is Afsha Ansari. He is the great-grandson of Mukhtar Ahmed Ansari – a political leader and former president of the Indian National Congress and the Muslim League during the Indian Independence Movement. One of the founders of the Jamia Millia Islamia University, he remained its Chancellor from 1928 to 1936. Abbas's uncles, Afzal Ansari and Sibgatullah Ansari, have been very active in Indian politics and have held various positions in the Uttar Pradesh Legislative Assembly.

== Political career ==
Abbas is the former MLA of Mau Assembly constituency. He was removed from office following his termination. Later his membership was restored by Uttar Pradesh legislative assembly.

== Other representations ==
Ansari has also represented India at international level as a sport shooter in shotgun shooting.

== Arrests and controversies ==
=== Money laundering case ===
Ansari was arrested in November 2022 by the Enforcement Directorate in connection with money laundering activities. He has been held without bail as of 2024. During his incarceration, Abbas allegedly met his wife, Nikhat Ansari, illegally within the prison premises and ran his business from jail through his wife's phones. He was subsequently transferred from Chitrakoot prison to Kasganj district jail.

The Supreme Court on 7 March 2025 granted interim bail with "stringent" riders to the MLA of Suheldev Bharatiya Samaj Party Abbas Ansari in a case under the Uttar Pradesh Gangsters and Anti-Social Activities (Prevention) Act, 1986. Ansari was released from Kasganj district jail on Friday after he obtained interim bail from the Supreme Court under the Gangster Act. Jail Superintendent Vijay Vikram Singh has confirmed that he was released at 2 pm, with tight security arrangements during the process. After his release, Abbas, along with his family, left for Lucknow.

=== 2022 hate speech case and arrest ===
On 31 May 2025, a trial court in Mau concluded the trial and awarded two years jail term to Ansari, resulting in the termination of his Assembly membership. Mau police booked Ansari and others under Section 171F (offence of undue influence at an election) and Section 506 (criminal intimidation) of IPC.
