= S. M. Razaullah Ansari =

Indian Scientist (1932–2023)

Razaullah Ansari
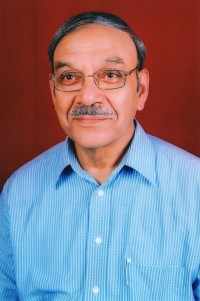
- Born: 8 April 1932; Delhi
- Died: 25 February 2023 (aged 90); New Delhi
- Occupation(s): Teaching, and research

Shaikh Mohammad Razaullah Ansari (8 April 1932 – 25 February 2023) was an Indian historian of science, physicist, astronomer and writer.

== Biography ==
Shaikh Mohammad Razaullah Ansari was born to a family of scholars. He got his B.Sc.(Honours) and M.Sc. in Physics from Delhi University in 1953 and 1955 respectively. In 1956, he joined as a lecturer in Physics in Delhi College, Delhi (now renamed as Zakir Hussain College). He secured a research fellowship of Alexander von Humboldt Foundation (Bonn, Germany) in 1959.

He worked there first at the Institute of Theoretical Physics and later shifted to Eberhard Karl University at Tübingen (Germany), where he completed his D.Sc. (Dr. rer. nat.) in 1966 in Mathematical Physics. During his sojourn in Germany, he specialized also in the history of exact science in India and Islamic countries. He researched during 1966-1969 as a research scholar/associate of German Council of Research in various capacities.

In 1969, he was invited by the Aligarh Muslim University to join the Physics Department as a Reader in theoretical physics. There he established a research group of astrophysics. His astrophysical work in Solar physics and Interstellar Matter was recognized both nationally and internationally by his election as a Fellow of the Royal Astronomical Society (UK) in 1972 and as a Member of International Astronomical Union (IAU) in 1973. Besides joining IAU Commissions of his specialty, Ansari joined also IAU Commission 41 (History of Astronomy) in which he became so active that he was elected as its Vice-president for 1991–1994, and President for 1994-1997. Ansari was the first Indian/Asian President of Commission 41 since its inception.

In 1997, he organized a symposium on History of Oriental Astronomy at the General Assembly of IAU, held in Kyoto, the proceedings of which were edited by him and published. Thereafter, Ansari shifted his research field to history of astronomy and mathematics, particularly of Medieval India, which, after his retirement in 1994 from Aligarh Muslim University, has become his passion for researching primary sources of history of science.

Ansari died on 25 February 2023, at the age of 90.

== Works and achievements ==
His works are extant in the field of Venus and it's transit, the sun, astronomy in medieval islam and indian astronomy where he is well cited

He was awarded Humboldt Fellowship, Alexander von Humboldt Foundation to work in Germany

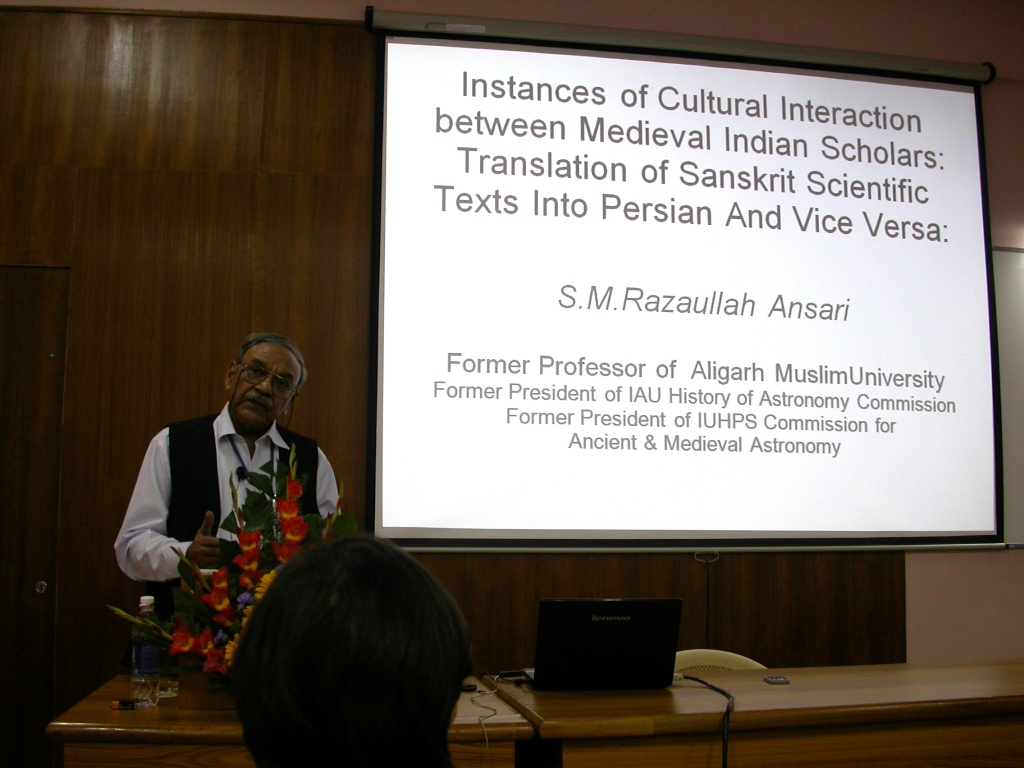
Razaullah Ansari giving a lecture at Centre for the Study of Culture and Society (2009)

== Books ==
He contributed many chapters on history of science in many books, but here are some of his books based on Zij, Avempace, Qotb al-Din Shirazi that he edited:

1. History of oriental astronomy: proceedings of the joint discussion-17 at the 23rd General Assembly of the International Astronomical Union, organised by the Commission 41 (History of Astronomy), held in Kyoto, August 25–26, 1997, Springer, ISBN 1-4020-0657-8
2. History of oriental astronomy, Kluwer Academic Publishers, ISBN 1-4020-0657-8, Netherlands
3. Quasi-binomial Representations of Clebsch-Gordan Coefficients, Fortschritte der Physik 1967; Volume 14, Issue 12, pages 729-751
4. History of Science in Medieval India, Idarah-i Adabiyat-i Delli - Jayyad Press, India
5. Science and technology in the Islamic world with a proceedings, 2002 by Brepols in Turnhout, Belgium

== Association with learned bodies ==
1. Fellow, Royal Astronomical Society (London), 1972
2. Founder Secretary-general, Ibn Sina Academy of Medieval Medicine and Sciences
3. Founder Editor (1985–2000), ‘Studies in History of Medicine and Science’ (ISSN 0970-5562), Jamia Hamdard, New Delhi
4. Founder Editor, 'Newsletter of Ibn Sina Academy' (NISA), Aligarh (ISSN 0972-6411)
5. Member secretary, Indian Committee of International Union for History and Philosophy of Science (IUHPS)
6. President, International Union for History and Philosophy (IUHPS) Commission for Science and Technology in Islamic Civilization, 1993–97
7. President, International Astronomical Union (IAU) Commission for History of Astronomy, 1994–97
8. President, IUHPS-IAU Joint Inter-Union Commission for History of Astronomy, 1997–2001
9. President, IUHPS Commission for History of Ancient and Medieval Astronomy, 2001–2005; re-elected from 2005–2009
10. Elected Assessor, IUHPS Council for 1989-93; re-elected for 1994-97
11. First Vice-President, Council of the International Union for History and Philosophy of Science
12. Board Members Affiliates, The Islamic Scientific Manuscripts Initiative (ISMI)
13. Executive Member, Indian National Commission for History of Science
14. President, International Commission for Astronomy
15. Elected President, Commission for History of Ancient and Medieval Astronomy (CHAMA)
16. Member, International Congress of History of Science
17. Member, Indian National Commission for History of Science
18. Member, International Astronomical Union (IAU), 1973
19. Member, International Academy of the History of Science (AIHS), 1986
20. Member, Indian National Science Academy
21. Member, Commission of Islamic Sciences
22. Member, Indian Delegation to the 500th Anniversary Celebration of Nicolaus Copernicus, Torun, Poland, 1973

== See also ==
- Hakim Syed Zillur Rahman, scholar of history of medicine
