= Ansari (nesba) =

Islamic community

Ansaris
الأنصار
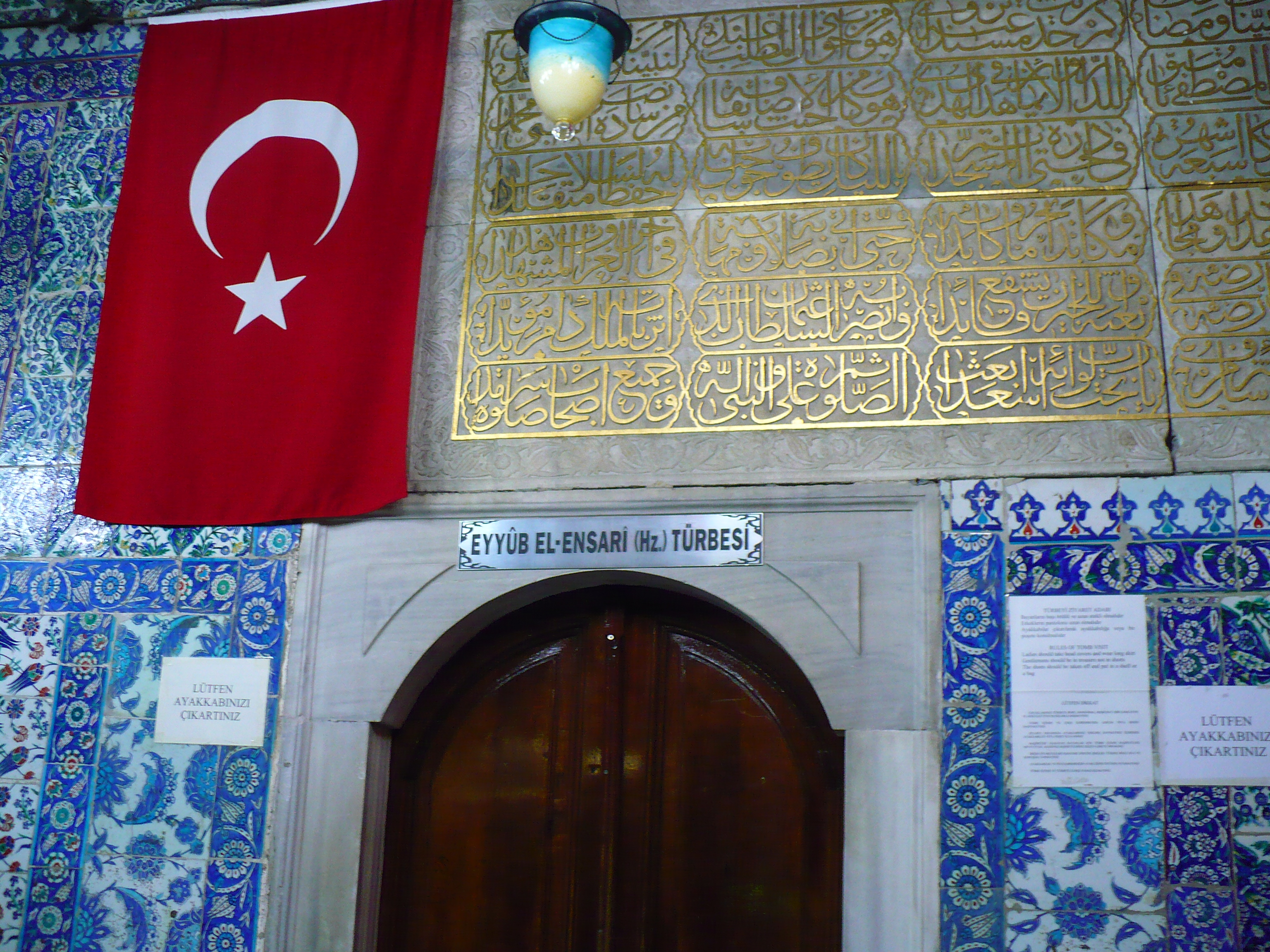

Regions with significant populations
- Arab world, Turkey, South Asia, Iran

Languages
- Arabic, Turkish, Gujarati, Urdu, Persian, Hindi, Sindhi

Religion
- Islam

Al-Ansari or Ansari is an Arab community, found predominantly in the Arab and South Asian countries. They are descended from the Ansar of Madinah. The Ansaris are an Arabic speaking community, though the descendants of those who settled elsewhere outside of Arabia, speak the native language of the regions they settled in.

== History ==
The Ansaris are the descendants of the Ansar tribe of Madinah. They are found throughout the Middle East and South Asia. The Ansaris that are still living today in Arabia have migrated to other places such as Qatar, Bahrain and other parts of Saudi Arabia. The people of the Ansari tribe in South Asia are few. They arrived there when the son of Abu Ayyub al-Ansari took part in the Muslim conquest of Khorasan and settled in Herat. They are descended from the Sufi saint Abdullah Ansari and migrated to India in 1526 under the Mughal Sultan Babur. Some Ansari settlements in south Asia can be found in, Yusufpur, Saharanpur, Lucknow Firangi Mahal and Panipat.

== Notable Ansaris ==
=== Medieval ===
- Abu Ayyub al-Ansari, a prominent companion of Muhammad
- Ansari (other companions of Muhammad)
- Sa'id ibn Aws al-Ansari (died 830), Arab linguist and narrator of hadith
- Yaqub ibn Ibrahim al-Ansari (d.767), Hanafi Muslim Jurist and scholar
- Abu al-Qasim al-Zahrawi (936–1013), also known as Albucasis, Arab Muslim physician and surgeon who lived in Al-Andalus
- Alāʾ al-DīnʿAlī ibn Ibrāhīm al-Ansari (1304–1375), also known as Ibn al-Shatir, prominent Arab astronomer and instruments maker.
- Khwaja Abdullah Ansari (1006–1088), Perso-Arab mystic and poet, and one of the descendants of Abu Ayyub al-Ansari
- Shams al-Din al-Ansari al-Dimashqi (1256–1327), Syrian Arab geographer
- Zakariyya al-Ansari (1420–1520), Egyptian Sufi mystic

=== Modern ===
- Khwaja Muhammad Latif Ansari (b. 1887-d. 1979), was a scholar and descendant of Khwaja Abdullah Ansari, the descendant of Abu Ayyub al-Ansari
- Morteza Ansari (1781–1864), Shia jurist from Dezful, Iran
- Muhammad Mian Mansoor Ansari (1879–1946), Indian freedom fighter, Hero of the Silken Letters Movement-1904-1916, diplomat, jurist, political scientist Deoband-India, Kabul-Afghanistan, Ankara-Turkey.
- Abidullah Ghazi, (1936-2021), Indian-American Academic, syllabus developer, author, Chicago, Illinois, USA.
- Rashid Ahmad Gangohi, (1839–1905). Indian Islamic scholar, jurist, academic, freedom fighter in 1857 War of Independence. Gangoh, Uttar Pradesh, India.
- Abdulrahman al-Ansary, (b. 1935-d. 2023), Saudi Arabian archaeologist.
- Hamid Ansari is an Indian politician and retired Indian Foreign Service (IFS) officer who was the 12th vice president of India from 2007 to 2017.
- Mukhtar Ansari (b.1963-d. 2024) was a convicted Indian gangster and politician from Uttar Pradesh.

== Naats in Islam ==
- Tala‘ al-Badru ‘Alaynā (Arabic: طلع البدر علينا) is a traditional Islamic song known as nasheed that the Ansar sang to Muhammad upon his arrival at Yathrib after completing the Hijra in 622 CE. The naat is currently over 1400 years old, and one of the oldest in the Islam.

== See also ==
- Islam in India
- Banu Khazraj
- Banu Aws
- Alawites
- Tala' al Badru 'Alayna
- Ansar (Islam)
- Brotherhood among the Sahabah
