= Imitiyaz Ahmad =

Indian politician

Imtiyaz Ali
- امتیاز علی

11th Legislative Assembly of Uttar Pradesh
- In office June 1991 – Dec 1992
- Constituency: Mau

Personal details
- Party: Communist Party of India

Imtiyaz Ahmad is an Indian politician of the Communist Party of India. He was elected as a member of the Uttar Pradesh Legislative Assembly, from Mau Assembly constituency, in 1991.
