= Shaukatullah Shah Ansari =

Indian politician (1908–1972)

Dr. Shaukatullah Shah Ansari शौकतुल्ला शाह अंसारी
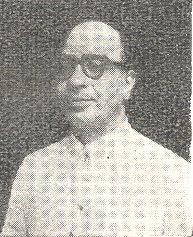

8th Governor of Orissa
- In office 31 January 1968 – 20 September 1971
- Preceded by: Ajudhia Nath Khosla
- Succeeded by: Jogendra Singh (politician)

Member of Parliament, Lok Sabha
- In office 1951–1957
- Succeeded by: None
- Constituency: Bidar

Personal details
- Born: 12 May 1908 Yusufpur, Ghazipur, India
- Died: 29 December 1972 (aged 64)
- Spouse: Zohra Ansari
- Occupation: Indian independence activist, politician, diplomat

Dr. Shaukatullah Shah Ansari (12 May 1908 – 29 December 1972) was an Indian politician, physician, diplomat, and physician who was elected to the Indian Parliament from the Bidar parliamentary constituency for the first Lok Sabha of India.

== Early life ==
Shaukatullah Shah was born on 16 June 1908 in Yusufpur-Mohammadabad in Ghazipur, Uttar Pradesh. His father, Amjadulla Shah, was a district judge at Mirzapur, and his mother was Qamrun Bibi the sister of Mukhtar Ahmed Ansari. Shaukatullah Shah received his early education at home. Thereafter he got enrolled at Aligarh Muslim University for higher studies. He obtained his bachelor's degree in sciences and doctor of medicine from Geneva high school, Switzerland and University of Paris, France. He was adopted by the former president of Indian National Congress Mukhtar Ahmed Ansari. He started practicing medicine in Delhi in 1937 with his dispensary in Chandni Chowk near fountain. Educated in Paris at a time when the European intellectual atmosphere was surcharged with socialism and its struggle against fascism (with the Second World War about to break out), Shaukat studied socialism under the influence of the Popular Front before his return to India. When he left Paris there was a growing threat of politicized right-wing violence in the streets of the city, while on the left, there was the Popular Front pulling together Radicals (a centrist group), socialists and communists.

In 1938, on his return to India, Shaukat moved to 41-Rajpur Road in a rented house after his uncle died. Dar-as-Salam, the haveli of Dr. Mukhtar Ahmed Ansari was sold. Shaukat House at Rajpur Road was a shelter for political activists and progressive writers like Majaz and Suryakant Tripathi. Shaukat regularly helped Communist Party of India (CPI) with financial support due to his commitment towards socialism. He drifted away from the CPI in 1939 when the demand of Pakistan surfaced and the left party supported it. Shaukat fought a losing battle organizing the Nationalist Muslims under the banner of the Azad Muslim Board. As the president of AMB, he rejected the very idea of the two-nation theory and its demand for the creation of Pakistan.

== Career ==
As an Indian independence activist he actively participated in the Non-cooperation movement. After independence was achieved he was appointed to the position of Counsellor in the Indian Embassy in Ankara, Turkey, in 1948. In 1951, Ansari was elected to the first Lok Sabha from Bidar, Hyderabad State. As a member of Parliament, he served on the Advisory Committee for External Affairs. In 1954 and 1955, he went to the United Nations as member of the Indian delegation. In 1957, Dr Ansari went to Laos as Chairman of the International Control Commission. From July 1958 to September 1960 he served in similar capacity on the International Control Commission in Vietnam. He represented India at the International Labour Conference in Geneva in 1955. In 1960, he was appointed Ambassador of India to Sudan and Congo. He assumed office as Governor of Orissa on 31 January 1968 and held the post until 1971.

Agreeing with the request of Jawaharlal Nehru, he contested Second Lok Sabha general election in 1957 from his native Rasra Constituency but lost to Sarjoo Pandey, the candidate from Communist Party of India. In this electoral contest former Prime Minister of India Chandra Shekhar secured the third spot garnering twenty percent of the total votes.

== Positions held ==
- Counsellor, Indian Embassy in Turkey, 1947–48
- Member, Delhi University Court, 1947—49
- Member of Parliament (Lok Sabha), Bidar 1951-1957
- Member of the Indian Delegation to the United Nations, 1954, 1955
- Chairman, International Commission for Supervision and Control, Laos and Vietnam 1957 - 1960
- Ambassador to Sudan, 1960
- Ambassador to Congo, 1960
- Governor of Odisha, 1968-71

== See also ==
- Hamid Ansari
- Mukhtar Ansari
- Dr Mukhtar Ahmed Ansari
- Syed Akbaruddin
