= Sheikh Sadiq Ali Ansari =

Indian government official

Sheikh Sadiq Ali was a Deputy Collector in the Upper Sind Frontier District, Vazir of Khairpur State and was also a Muslim Elected Member of the Bombay Legislative Council for three terms from Sindh along with Rai Bahadur Udhwdas Tarachand. He belonged to the Ansari family of Madina.

Sadiq Ali wrote the book Muslim Tribes in Sindh, Balochistan and Afghanistan, published in 1901.
