= Krishnanand Rai =

Indian politician (1956-2005)

Member (MLA) in Uttar Pradesh Legislative Assembly
- In office 2002–2005
- Preceded by: Afzal Ansari
- Succeeded by: Alka Rai
- Constituency: Mohammadabad

Personal details
- Born: 11 December 1956 Ghazipur, Uttar Pradesh, India
- Died: 29 November 2005 (aged 48) Baswania, Uttar Pradesh, India
- Cause of death: Assassination
- Party: Bharatiya Janata Party (1999–2005)
- Spouse: Alka Rai
- Profession: Politician

Krishnanand Rai (11 December 1956 – 29 November 2005) was an Indian politician from Uttar Pradesh. He served as a MLA from 2002 to 2005 representing Mohammadabad Assembly constituency located at Ghazipur district. His first stint in electoral politics was in 1999 from the same constituency, which he lost. He was the member of the Bharatiya Janata Party (BJP).

== Early life and education ==
Rai was the youngest of three brothers born to Lalita Rai and Jagannath Rai in the village of Gondaur, Ghazipur district, Uttar Pradesh. With ample farm land around rich and fertile gangetic basin, the primary source of earning and livelihood for the family was agriculture. His mother died when he was a year old and thereafter he was raised by his grandmother. His early schooling was done at the native village. At the age of 13 he moved to Varanasi to join the Central Hindu School and later attended Banaras Hindu University, planning to study medicine. This was the time when he came across people like Manoj Sinha (Lok Sabha MP), Narendra Singh (Professor of BHU) who later became his close friends. Due to financial constraints and series of untoward incidents at college, he ended up dropping out of school and sought work.

== Career and politics ==
Rai began work as a contractor and became a well-known builder in Varanasi. His initial work included government funded roads, bridges etc. but later on he moved towards construction of residential buildings.

After several ventures, he finally decided to do something he pined. He kept his aspirations of becoming a politician alive and represented Mohammadabad in the Uttar Pradesh Assembly, becoming a member of the Purvanchal unit of the Bharatiya Janata Party (BJP). His close proximity to Manoj Sinha was initial thrust for him to venture into politics. He promoted Hindu sentiments and the fact that he was a Bhumihar, increased his influence. In 2002, he was elected to the Legislative Assembly of Uttar Pradesh from the Mohammadabad constituency in Ghazipur. There he was a member of the Bharatiya Janata Party. He discovered politics to be a way to reward people.

In 2017, his wife, Alka Rai won the assembly seat from Mohammadabad.

== Assassination and aftermath ==
A memorial at Basaniya commemorating Rai and others who died.

Rai was murdered on 29 November 2005, while attending a family wedding in his native village. He had been made aware of a death threat by Special Task Force officers, who warned him of hired killers at the residence of a local politician and gangster Mukhtar Ansari. He was coaxed to start a cricket match in Siyari and was persuaded not to use his bullet-proof vehicle or guards. He was ambushed on his way back home by assailants who used automatic rifles. Seven people died in total.

The killing caused an outrage in the region. Senior BJP leaders such as Atal Bihari Vajpayee, L. K. Advani, Rajnath Singh, Kalyan Singh and Manoj Sinha demanded a CBI inquiry but the government initially rejected their calls for fear of being indicted. First Information Reports were filed against Mukhtar Ansari and Afzal Ansari but Bhajani Ram Meena, the Superintendent of Police (SP) appointed to investigate, left the case. He alleged undue pressure and asked for it to be transferred to the CBCID. After six months even the CBCID gave up the case complaining undue pressure. Finding no remedy, the wife of Krishnanand Rai filed a writ in Allahabad High Court demanding a CBI inquiry into the killing of her husband. The writ petition in Allahabad High Court by Alka Rai provides detail of thirty criminal cases against the Ansari brothers. The Court ordered a CBI inquiry in May 2006.

Ansari was accused of ordering the killing and was placed in Agra jail in 2010. He was convicted in April 2023 and sentenced to ten years in prison. However, Mukhtar Ansari died a year later, on 28 March 2024 while he was serving his sentence in Banda Jail. Another person alleged to have been involved in the murder - Afroz, also known as Chunnu Pehlwan - was arrested in June 2014 and placed in judicial custody.

== See also ==
- List of assassinated Indian politicians
