= Mohammadabad Assembly constituency =

Constituency of the Uttar Pradesh legislative assembly in India

Coordinates: 27.31°N 79.43°E

Mohammadabad
- Constituency No. 378 for the Uttar Pradesh Legislative Assembly

Constituency details
- Country: India
- Region: North India
- State: Uttar Pradesh
- District: Ghazipur
- Total electors: 4,24,837
- Reservation: None

Member of Legislative Assembly
- 18th Uttar Pradesh Legislative Assembly
- Incumbent Suhaib Ansari
- Party: Samajwadi Party
- Elected year: 2022

Mohammadabad is a constituency of the Uttar Pradesh Legislative Assembly, and a segment of Ballia Lok Sabha constituency, covering the city of Mohammadabad (also spelled Muhammadabad) in the Ghazipur district of Uttar Pradesh, India. It should not be confused with the assembly segment Muhammadabad-Gohna which falls under Ghosi Lok Sabha seat in Mau district.

Mohammadabad is one of five assembly constituencies in the Ballia Lok Sabha constituency. Since 2008, this assembly constituency is numbered 378 amongst 403 constituencies.

== Members of the Legislative Assembly ==
Year	Member	Party
1957	Sarju Pande	Communist Party of India
1957	Raghubir	Communist Party of India
1962	Vijay Shankar Singh	Indian National Congress
1967	Vijay Shankar Singh	Indian National Congress
1969	Vijay Shankar Singh	Indian National Congress
1974	Ram Janam Rai	Bharatiya Kranti Dal
1977	Ram Janam Rai	Janata Party
1980	Vijay Shankar Singh	Indian National Congress (I)
1985	Afzal Ansari	Communist Party of India
1989	Afzal Ansari	Communist Party of India
1991	Afzal Ansari	Communist Party of India
1993	Afzal Ansari	Communist Party of India
1996	Afzal Ansari	Samajwadi Party
2002	Krishnanand Rai	Bharatiya Janata Party
2006^	Alka Rai	Bharatiya Janata Party
2007	Sibgatullah Ansari	Samajwadi Party
2012	Sibgatullah Ansari	Quami Ekta Dal
2017	Alka Rai	Bharatiya Janata Party
2022	Suhaib Ansari	Samajwadi Party

== Election results ==
=== 2027 ===
2027 Uttar Pradesh Legislative Assembly election: Mohammadabad
Party	Candidate	Votes	%	±%
INDIA				
NDA				
BSP	Atul Rai			
NOTA	None of the above			
Majority				
Turnout				
gain from		Swing		

=== 2022 ===
2022 Uttar Pradesh Legislative Assembly election: Mohammadabad
Party	Candidate	Votes	%	±%
SP	Suhaib Ansari	111,443	45.26	
BJP	Alka Rai	92,684	37.64	▼15.44
BSP	Madhvendra Rai	32,440	13.18	▼25.68
Jan Adhikar Party	Sanjay Singh Kushwaha	2,522	1.02	▲0.78
INC	Dr. Arvind Roy	2,458	1.0	▼3.31
NOTA	None of the above	1,567	0.64	▼0.36
Majority		18,759	7.62	▼6.6
Turnout		246,214	57.95	▼0.36
SP gain from BJP		Swing		

=== 2017 ===
- Alka Rai (BJP) : 122,156 votes* Sibgatulla Ansari (BSP) : 89,429 (Lost by 32,727 votes)

2017 Uttar Pradesh Legislative Assembly Election: Mohammadaba
Party	Candidate	Votes	%	±%
BJP	Alka Rai	122,156	53.08	
BSP	Sibgatulla Ansari	89,429	38.86	
INC	Janak Kumar	9,910	4.31	
CPI	Surendra	2,503	1.09	
NOTA	None of the above	2,283	1.0	
Majority		32,727	14.22	
Turnout		230,144	58.31	

=== 1977 ===
- Ram Janam Rai (JNP) : 22,371 votes
- Krishna Nand Rai (INC) : 20,378 (He was not the same person as 2002 winner from this seat.)
