= Shailendra Singh =

Shailendra Singh may refer to:

- Shailendra Singh (police officer), former policeman, Right to Information Commissioner
- Shailendra Singh (singer) (born 1952), Indian playback singer
- Shailendra Singh (producer), Indian film producer, entrepreneur
