= Suhaib Ansari =

Indian politician

Member of the Uttar Pradesh Legislative Assembly
- Incumbent
- Assumed office 10 March 2022
- Preceded by: Alka Rai
- Constituency: Mohammadabad

Personal details
- Born: Uttar Pradesh, India
- Party: Samajwadi Party
- Parent: Sibgatullah Ansari (father)
- Education: Integral University
- Occupation: Politician

Suhaib Ansari is an Indian politician and businessman. He is a member of the 18th Legislative Assembly of Uttar Pradesh, representing the Mohammadabad Assembly constituency of Uttar Pradesh. He is a member of the Samajwadi Party, a socialist political party in India. He is son of Sibghatullah Ansari. He is Nephew of Mukhtar Ansari and Afzal Ansari. He is the great-grandson of Mukhtar Ahmad Ansari.

== Posts held ==
#	From	To	Position	Comments
03	2022	Incumbent	Member, 18th Legislative Assembly	elected first time

== See also ==
- 18th Uttar Pradesh Assembly
- Mohammadabad Assembly constituency
- Uttar Pradesh Legislative Assembly
