= Mau Assembly constituency =

Constituency of the Uttar Pradesh legislative assembly in India

Coordinates: 25.94°N 83.56°E

Mau
- Constituency No. 356 for the Uttar Pradesh Legislative Assembly

Constituency details
- Country: India
- Region: North India
- State: Uttar Pradesh
- District: Mau
- Lok Sabha constituency: Ghosi
- Total electors: 4,81,715
- Reservation: None

Member of Legislative Assembly
- 18th Uttar Pradesh Legislative Assembly
- Incumbent Abbas Ansari
- Party: SBSP
- Alliance: NDA
- Elected year: 2022

Mau is a constituency of the Uttar Pradesh Legislative Assembly covering the city of Mau in the Mau district of Uttar Pradesh, India.

Mau is one of five assembly constituencies in the Ghosi Lok Sabha constituency. Since 2008, this assembly constituency is numbered 356 amongst 403 constituencies.

== Members of Legislative Assembly ==
| Year | Member | Party |
|---|---|---|
| 1957 | Beni Bai | Indian National Congress |
| 1957 | Sudama Prasad Goswami | Indian National Congress |
| 1962 | Beni Bai | Indian National Congress |
| 1967 | Brij Mohan Das Agarwal | Bharatiya Jana Sangh |
| 1969 | Habibur Rahman | Bharatiya Kranti Dal |
| 1974 | Abdul Baqi | Communist Party of India |
| 1977 | Ram Ji | Janata Party |
| 1980 | Khairul Bashar | Independent |
| 1985 | Aqbal Ahmad | Communist Party of India |
| 1989 | Mobin Ahmad | Bahujan Samaj Party |
| 1991 | Imitiyaz Ahmad | Communist Party of India |
| 1993 | Naseem Khan | Bahujan Samaj Party |
| 1996 | Mukhtar Ansari | Bahujan Samaj Party |
| 2002 | Mukhtar Ansari | Independent |
| 2007 | Mukhtar Ansari | Independent |
| 2012 | Mukhtar Ansari | Quami Ekta Dal |
| 2017 | Mukhtar Ansari | Bahujan Samaj Party |
| 2022 | Abbas Ansari | Suheldev Bhartiya Samaj Party |

== Election results ==
=== 2027 ===
2027 Uttar Pradesh Legislative Assembly election: Mau
| Party | Candidate | Votes | % | ±% |
|---|---|---|---|---|
| INDIA | | | | |
| NDA | | | | |
| BSP | | | | |
| NOTA | None of the above | | | |
| Majority | | | | |
| Turnout | | | | |
| gain from | | Swing | | |

=== 2022 ===
2022 Uttar Pradesh Legislative Assembly election: Mau
| Party | Candidate | Votes | % | ±% |
|---|---|---|---|---|
| SBSP | Abbas Ansari | 124,691 | 44.69 | +11.57 |
| BJP | Ashok Singh | 86,575 | 31.03 | |
| BSP | Bheem Rajbhar | 44,516 | 15.96 | −20.43 |
| INC | Madhavendra Singh | 6,589 | 2.36 | |
| Janta Kranti Party (Rashtravadi) | Ram Kishor | 6,576 | 2.36 | |
| CPI | Fakhre Alam | 2,640 | 0.95 | +0.38 |
| NOTA | None of the above | 1,310 | 0.47 | −0.18 |
| Majority | | 38,116 | 13.66 | +10.39 |
| Turnout | | 278,996 | 57.92 | −2.23 |
| SBSP gain from BSP | | Swing | | |

=== 2017 ===
2017 General Elections: Mau
| Party | Candidate | Votes | % | ±% |
|---|---|---|---|---|
| BSP | Mukhtar Ansari | 96,793 | 36.39 | |
| SBSP | Mahendra Rajbhar | 88,095 | 33.12 | |
| SP | Altaf Ansari | 72,016 | 27.07 | |
| NOTA | None of the above | 1,725 | 0.65 | |
| Majority | | 8,698 | 3.27 | |
| Turnout | | 266,015 | 60.15 | |
| BSP gain from QED | | Swing | | |

=== 2012 ===
2017 Uttar Pradesh Legislative Assembly election: Mau
| Party | Candidate | Votes | % | ±% |
|---|---|---|---|---|
| QED | Mukhtar Ansari | 70,210 | 31.24 | |
| BSP | Bheem Rajbhar | 64,306 | 28.61 | |
| SP | Altaf Ansari | 54,216 | 24.12 | |
| BJP | Arijeet Singh | 9,888 | 4.40 | |
| Majority | | 5,904 | 2.63 | |
| Turnout | | 224,749 | 58.25 | |
| QED gain from Independent | | Swing | | |

=== 2007 ===
2007 Uttar Pradesh Legislative Assembly election: Mau
| Party | Candidate | Votes | % | ±% |
|---|---|---|---|---|
| Independent | Mukhtar Ansari | 70,226 | 46.78 | |
| BSP | Vijay Pratap Singh | 63,208 | 42.10 | |
| SBSP | Binod Kumar | 3,712 | 2.47 | |
| INC | Gopal | 3,082 | 2.05 | |
| Majority | | 7,018 | 4.68 | |
| Turnout | | 150,131 | | |
| Independent hold | | Swing | | |

=== 2002 ===
2002 Uttar Pradesh Legislative Assembly election: Mau
| Party | Candidate | Votes | % | ±% |
|---|---|---|---|---|
| Independent | Mukhtar Ansari | 70,687 | 46.06 | |
| SP | Sita Rai | 37,645 | 24.53 | |
| BSP | Salim Ansari | 26,045 | 16.97 | |
| CPI | Imtiyaz Ahmed | 6,520 | 4.25 | |
| INC | Hakim Irfan | 1,342 | 0.87 | |
| Majority | | 33,042 | 21.53 | |
| Turnout | | 153,452 | 58.03 | |
| Independent gain from BSP | | Swing | | |

=== 1996 ===
1996 Uttar Pradesh Legislative Assembly election: Mau
| Party | Candidate | Votes | % | ±% |
|---|---|---|---|---|
| BSP | Mukhtar Ansari | 67,731 | 46.85 | |
| BJP | Vijay Pratap Singh | 41,758 | 28.89 | |
| SP | Hafiz Mobin | 22,179 | 15.34 | |
| Independent | Abubakar | 11,266 | 7.79 | |
| BHJS | Phool Chand | 1,019 | 0.70 | |
| Majority | | 25,973 | 17.96 | |
| Turnout | | 144,561 | 57.92 | |
| BSP hold | | Swing | | |
