= Post Graduate College, Ghazipur =

College in Uttar Pradesh, India

PG College Ghazipur is a postgraduate college situated in Ghazipur, Uttar Pradesh, India. The college was established in July 1957 as the first Degree College of Ghazipur. Initially it was affiliated with University of Gorakhpur but since 1987 its affiliated with VBS Purvanchal University, Jaunpur. Currently it offers courses in four main streams: arts, science, agriculture, Commerce and education.

The college is recognised by UGC and accridiation by NAAC with B++ status.

== Location ==
The college is situated on the western edge of Ghazipur. Near the college is the famous archeological site tomb of Lord Cornwallis. Maharshi Vishwamitra Autonomous State Medical College is located nearby. The college has some large farms in its surroundings which are owned by the college's agricultural department. Its campus has a mango grove and a garden which has many varieties of Gulab flower.

The college is situated about 3.6 km to Ghazipur city railway station and approximately 3 km to Lanka bus stand.

== History ==
The college was founded as a degree college in affiliation with Gorakhpur University in 1957. Before becoming a college, it was a secondary school run by Theosophical Society Affiliates.

The statue of the founder of the college Babu Rajeshwar prasad singh in the campus was inaugurated by chief minister of the state shree Yogi Adityanath ji on 9 September 2022.

== Courses ==
Courses are offered in the arts (both bachelors (B.A.) and masters (M.A.)), sciences (B.Sc. and M.Sc.), agriculture (B.Sc.Ag.and M.Sc.Ag) and education (B.Ed.). Commerce( B.com and M.Com. ) The college has a new wing which is offering technical and professional courses (BCA, MCA, BBA and MBA), which are currently being run as a separate institution named TERIPGC. Degrees are offered from PTU.

=== Department of Agriculture science ===
==== Bachelors of Agriculture Bsc (hons.) Ag. ====
The degree in Bachelors of Agriculture [Bsc (hons.)Ag ] is one of the most demanded and prestigious course at the college. It is a four-year regular degree program that follows semester system i.e. 8 semesters.

The admission is taken on 120 seats every year at the college based on cutoff/merit released by college on the basis of PAT(pre Admission test) entrance which is self – conducted by the college. The entrance exam is given by approximately 2500 to 3000 students every year making it little hard to get in.

The Bsc Ag (hons.) course at the college runs according to ICAR [5th Dean committee] guidelines and plans. The college has various experience facilities and they have their separate departments related to the different agriculture subjects.Such as- Department of Agronomy, Department of horticulture, Department of plant breeding and genetics, Department of Soil science and Agriculture, Department of Agricultural economics, Department of Plant pathology, Department of Agricultural engineering & Department of Agriculture extension.

The college has its own vast field area for the Agriculture practical where practicals related to subjects are done. Departments have their own labs for practicals. Theory class are regular and timely conducted by faculties.

==== Master of Agriculture science [Msc Ag] ====
The college also offers master's degree in some Agriculture subjects. Some courses offered in Msc. AG by the college : Horticulture, Plant breeding and genetics and Agriculture economics.

== Notable alumni ==
- Mukhtar Ansari
- Afzal Ansari
