= Yusufpur, Ghazipur =

Yusufpur
- Town
- Location in Uttar Pradesh, India Yusufpur (India)
- Country: India
- State: Uttar Pradesh
- District: Ghazipur
- Settled: 350–400 BCE
- Founded: 1592
- Founder: Qazi Najmuddin Siraj Ansari

Government
  - Type: Municipal Council
  - Body: Nagar Palika Parishad Mohammadabad

Area
  - Total: 6.35 km^{2} (2.45 sq mi)

Population (2020)
  - Total: 194,806
  - Rank: 391
  - Sex ratio: 810♀/♂
- Demonym: Yusufpuri

Languages
  - Official: Hindi
- Time zone: UTC+5:30 (IST)
- PIN: 233227
- 05493: 233227
- Vehicle registration: UP61

The Ansari Family of Yusufpur

Yusufpur (युसुफपुर یوسف پور) and Mohammadabad is a Twin Town/Qasba in Mohammadabad Tahsil of the Ghazipur district of Uttar Pradesh, India.It belongs to Varanasi Division. Coordinates: 25°37′22″N 83°45′27″E It is located 21 km East of District headquarters Ghazipur and 347 km from the state capital, Lucknow. It borders the Ballia District, Mau District and Buxar District of Bihar. Yusufpur has a railway station which lies on the railway line linking Varanasi to Chhapra via Ghazipur and Ballia in the North Eastern Railway Zone. Yusufpur was founded by Qazi Ahmed Ansari in 1593.

== History ==
The land that would become Yusufpur was conquered in 1526 by the Mughals, specifically by the descendants of Abu Ismaïl Abdullah al-Harawi al-Ansari or Abdullah Ansari Peer E Herat. in the 9th generation of Khalid Bin Zaid Abu Ayyub al-Ansari.

Sheikh Jamal Ahmed Makki was a scholar and spiritual figure in the Mughal era. He resided in Rasoolpur Jamal of Mohammedabad Pargana and claimed descent from 1st Khalifa of Islam Hazrat Abu Bakr R.A. He had thousands of disciples and was also held in high esteem by the Mughals. His presence and teachings helped spread Islam in the area during the reign of the first three Mughal emperors, Babur, Humayun and Akbar.

Shaikh Jamal was a disciple of Sheikh Abdul Quddoos Gangohi and settled in Ghazipur. He joined Humayun's army and left on the expedition to subdue Nasir Khan Lohani, the ruler of Ghazipur. Passing through Ghazipur he reached Muhammadabad Parhar Bari. He liked the place and got permission from the king to let him stay.

At that time, the area was surrounded by jungle and was inhabited by aboriginal tribes such as Seori, Cheero and Rajbhar. As per the history of Rasoolpur Jamal, some of these tribes accepted Islam and lived peacefully. However, a number of them continued in their old ways. They used to rob the travellers passing by, and, on resistance, killed them. It was a time of great uncertainty and chaos. Sheikh Jamal tried to convince them to mend their ways; but to no avail. Finally, and as a last resort, he wrote a letter to the King Humayun as follows:

“This area now known as Mohammedabad Parhar Bah parganah is steeped in ignorance and infidelity. There is nobody here who could make these inhabitants follow the right path without the use of sword. To rectify this situation we need a strong and powerful ruler who can crush them ”.

On receipt of Sheikh Jamal's letter, the King despatched Khwaja Najmuddin Siraj Ansari as the Qazi & Nazim E Paragna of the area, Mirza Adil Baig as Minister of Finance & The Army was under command of Alawal Khan Afga. After a bloody battle, they were successful in crushing the miscreants. The King rewarded the two with official letters of appointment and Jageers (Large tracts of land). These two established a number of places such as Adilabad and Qazipur Siraj & a fort was built in a suburb of Yusufpur now known as Village Alawalpur Afga. Khwaja Najmuddin Siraj, who was the Qazi & Nazim E Paragna of the entire area called Qazipur Siraj, had no son. At the same time, his brother Khwaja Mobin alias Mitthan had married a woman from the Ansari family that had settled at Saiket, Shikohabad. He had with a son who was named Khwaja Hameeduddin Saadullah Alias Qazi Yusuf. Qazi Najmuddin Siraj married his daughter Fatima Bibi to Qazi Yusuf, Shaikh Jamal Makki's daugheter Ayesha Bibi was also married to Qazi Yusuf as Second Wife.

After the death of Khwaja Najmuddin Siraj, Qazi Yusuf was appointed Qazi & Nazim E Paragna by Akbar in 968H/1568CE. Qazi Yusuf is known as the ancestor of Ansaris of Yusufpur. His son Qazi Ahmed enhanced the area to the level of parganah and named it Yusufpur after him in 1593.

== Notable Individuals ==
Notable people from Yusufpur include:

- Dr. Mukhtar Ahmed Ansari, was an Indian nationalist and political leader, and former president of the Indian National Congress and the Muslim League during the Indian Independence Movement.
- Brigadier Mohammad Usman, was the highest-ranking officer of the Indian Army killed in action during the Indo-Pakistani War of 1947.
- Afzal Ansari, is an Indian politician of the Bahujan Samaj Party and currently an incumbent Senior Member of Parliament (MP) of India for the Ghazipur constituency, Uttar Pradesh.
- Sibakatullah Ansari, Indian politician who has served as an MLA representing Mohammadabad in Ghazipur district, Uttar Pradesh, India from 2007 to 2017.
- Mohammad Hamid Ansari, is an Indian politician and retired Indian Foreign Service (IFS) officer who was the 12th vice president of India from 2007 to 2017.
- Mukhtar Ansari, was a convicted Indian gangster and politician from Uttar Pradesh.[3] He had been elected as a Member of the Legislative Assembly from the Mau constituency five times, including twice as a Bahujan Samaj Party candidate.
- Faridul Haq Ansari, was a lawyer and politician who actively participated in the Indian independence movement.
- Suhaib Ansari, is an Indian politician and businessman. He is a member of the 18th Legislative Assembly of Uttar Pradesh, representing the Mohammadabad Assembly constituency of Uttar Pradesh.
