= Manoj Sinha =

2nd Lieutenant Governor of Jammu and Kashmir

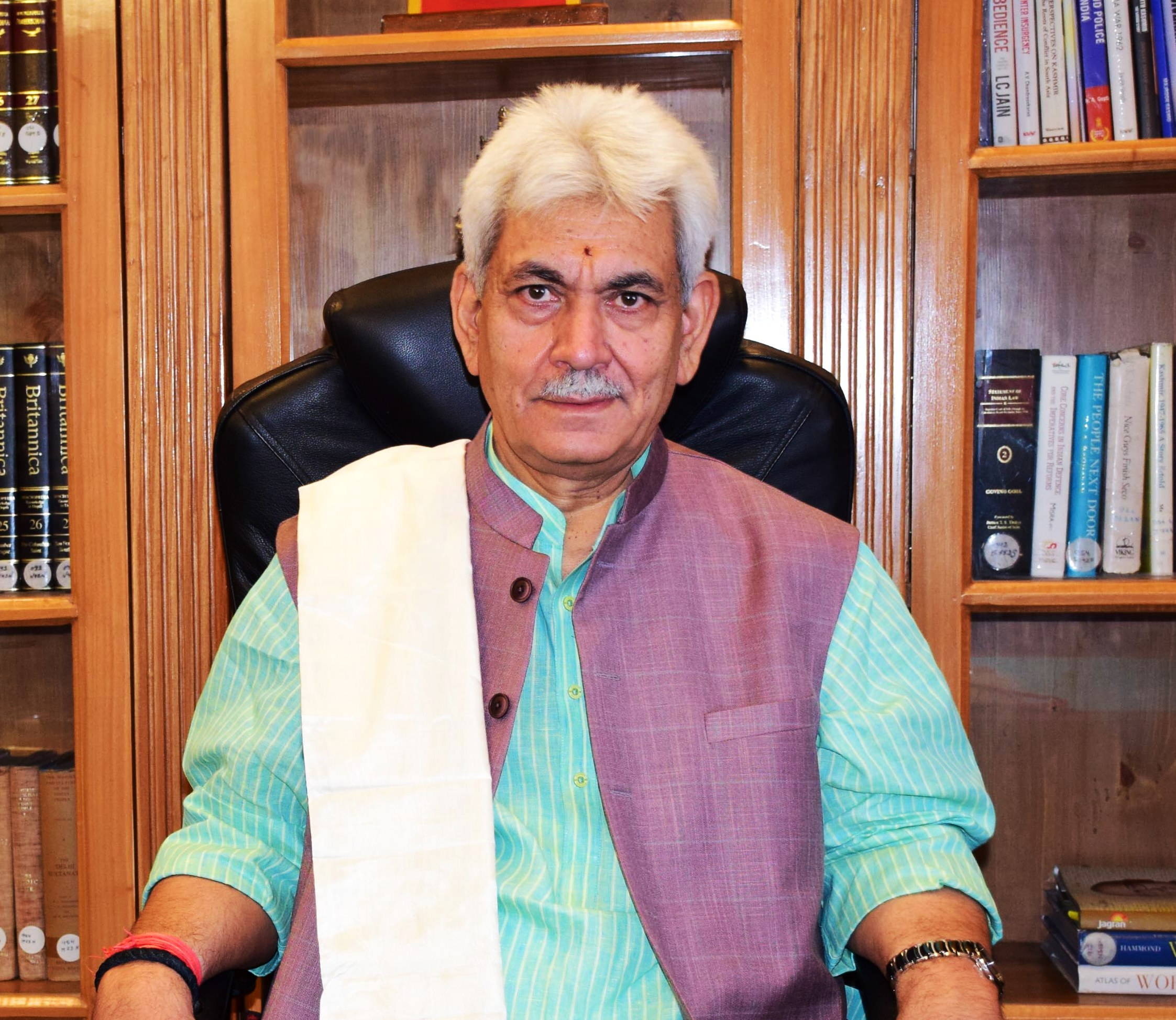
- Sinha in 2024

2nd Lieutenant Governor of Jammu and Kashmir
- Incumbent
- Assumed office 7 August 2020
- Appointed by: Ram Nath Kovind
- President: Ram Nath Kovind; Droupadi Murmu
- Chief Minister: Vacant (till 2024); Omar Abdullah (from 2024)
- Preceded by: G. C. Murmu

Union Minister of State
- In office 16 May 2014 – 24 May 2019
- Prime Minister: Narendra Modi
- Ministry: Term
- Railways (MoS): 26 May 2014 – 30 May 2019
- Communications (MoS I/C): 5 July 2016 – 30 May 2019

Member of Parliament, Lok Sabha
- In office 16 May 2014 – 23 May 2019
- Preceded by: Radhe Mohan Singh
- Succeeded by: Afzal Ansari
- Constituency: Ghazipur, Uttar Pradesh
- In office 6 October 1999 – 16 May 2004
- Preceded by: Omprakash Singh
- Succeeded by: Afzal Ansari
- Constituency: Ghazipur, Uttar Pradesh
- In office 10 May 1996 – 10 Match 1998
- Preceded by: Vishwanath Shastri
- Succeeded by: Omprakash Singh
- Constituency: Ghazipur, Uttar Pradesh

Personal details
- Born: 1 July 1959 (age 67) Mohanpura, Uttar Pradesh, India
- Citizenship: Indian
- Party: Bharatiya Janata Party
- Spouse: Neelam Sinha (m. 1977)
- Education: Indian Institute of Technology (BHU) Varanasi
- Profession: Civil engineer

Manoj Sinha (born 1 July 1959) is an Indian politician serving as the 2nd and the current lieutenant governor of Jammu and Kashmir in the disputed Kashmir region. He served as the minister of state for Communications (independent charge) and minister of state for Railways in the government of India. Sinha was elected to the Lok Sabha, representing Ghazipur parliamentary constituency for three terms from the Bharatiya Janata Party. Sinha was in the race for the post of Uttar Pradesh chief minister after the 2017 Uttar Pradesh Legislative Assembly election.

== Early life and education ==
Sinha was born in Mohanpura of Ghazipur district of Uttar Pradesh on 1 July 1959. He has a B.Tech And M.Tech degree in Civil Engineering from the Indian Institute of Technology (BHU) Varanasi (earlier called IT-BHU). During his student days, Sinha was the students' union president in the Banaras Hindu University.

== Political career ==
His political career began when he was elected as the president of Banaras Hindu University Students Union in 1982. He was elected to the Lok Sabha for the first time in 1996 and repeated the term in 1999. Sinha has been a member of the BJP national council from 1989 to 1996. He was elected to the Lower House for a third term in national politics when the BJP swept the Lok Sabha elections in 2014.

Prior to joining active politics, he was a member of the General Council, School of Planning during 1999–2000. He has also been a member of committee on Energy and member of committee on Government Assurances.

He was inducted as a member of the BJP National Council in 1989. He was elected for successive terms in 1996 & 1999 and again in 2014 to the Lok Sabha from Ghazipur Constituency in Uttar Pradesh. He was made the Minister of State for the Railways Ministry in the first set of ministers inducted into Narendra Modi government in May 2014. In July 2016, during the second cabinet reshuffle, he was also made Minister of State (Independent Charge) of the Communications Ministry.

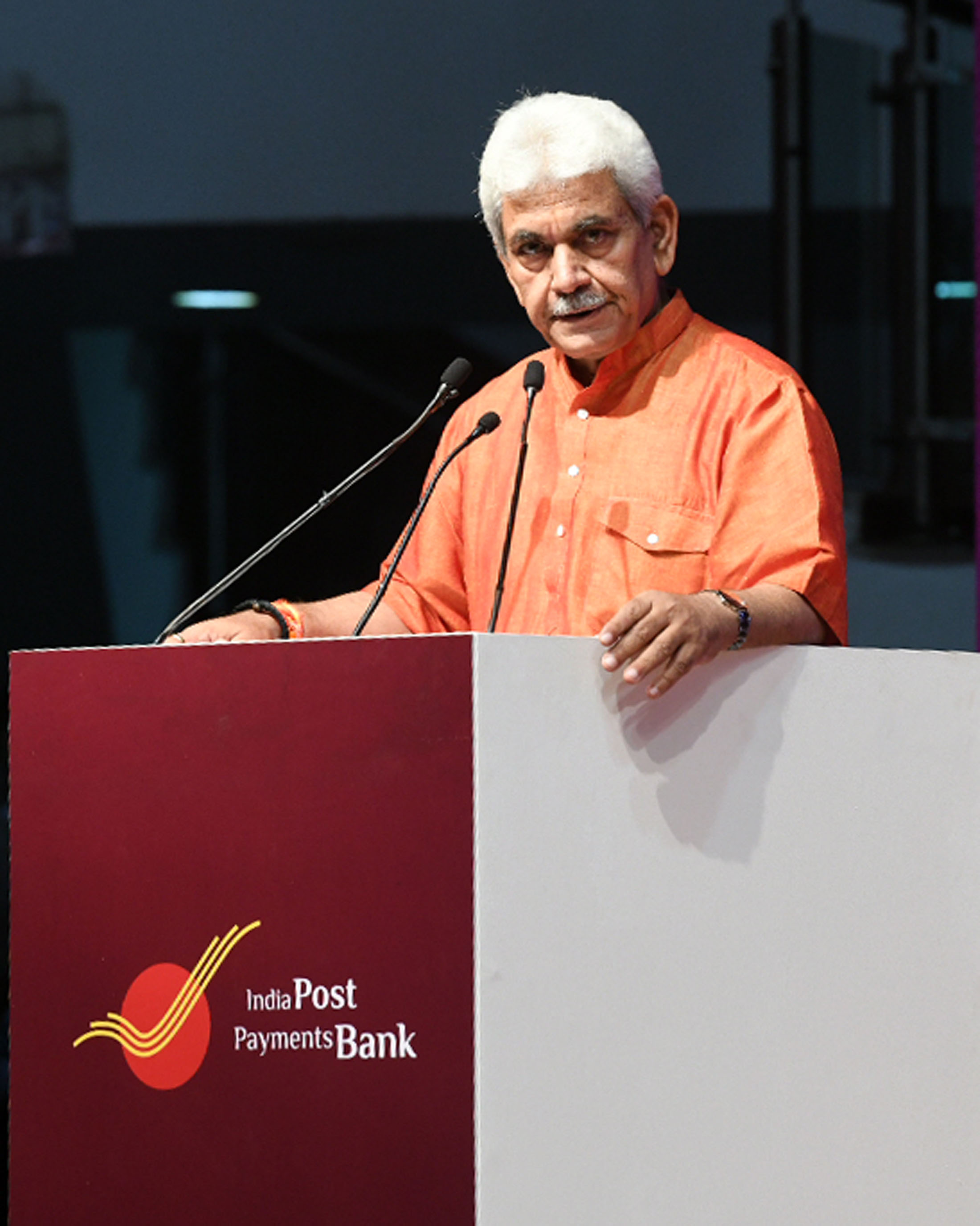
Manoj Sinha at the launch of the India Post Payments Bank, in New Delhi on 1 September 2018

An agriculturalist at heart and a silent performer who consciously maintains a low profile, Sinha has been among the best performing members of Parliament in the 13th Lok Sabha in 1999.

Recently, he was counted among the seven most honest MPs by a leading magazine. Sinha, a civil engineer and an IIT-BHU alumnus, has set a rare example by utilising his entire MPLAD Fund for the welfare of the people of his constituency.

He is both recognised for a strong ability to connect with masses, especially at the rural level along with being a firm administrator.

== As Lieutenant Governor of Jammu and Kashmir ==
Manoj Sinha was appointed the Lieutenant Governor of Jammu and Kashmir by the President of India, a day after G. C. Murmu resigned. On 7 August 2020, Sinha completed his oath of office.

== Accusations ==
Ashok Kumar Parmar, an IAS officer, has accused Manoj Sinha of inflicting 'harassment, humiliation, intimidation, atrocious behaviour and frequent transfers for his being a Scheduled Caste solely for the reason that he highlighted bungling in implementation of Jal Jeevan Mission.

In October 2023, Parmar alleged that Sinha Administration amended a multi-crore insurance contract to favour Bajaj Allianz General Insurance Company.

On 7 July 2024, a Letter from Jammu and Kashmir's resident commissioner in New Delhi to principal secretary in Raj Bhawan alleged misuse of public funds by Manoj Sinha to fund a "personal function" reportedly on the eve of his son's engagement ceremony in 2021.

== Personal life ==
Manoj Sinha married Neelam Sinha on 8 May 1977. They have a daughter and a son, Abhinav Sinha.

Lok Sabha
Preceded by Vishwanath Shastri	Member of Parliament for Ghazipur; 1996–1998	Succeeded by Omprakash Singh
Preceded by Omprakash Singh	Member of Parliament for Ghazipur; 1999–2004	Succeeded by Afzal Ansari
Preceded by Radhe Mohan Singh	Member of Parliament for Ghazipur; 2014–2019	Succeeded by Afzal Ansari
Political offices
Preceded by Ravi Shankar Prasad	Minister of Communications; 5 July 2016 - 24 May 2019; Minister of State (Independent Charge)	Succeeded by Sanjay Shamrao Dhotre
Government offices
Preceded by G. C. Murmu	Lieutenant governor of Jammu and Kashmir; 6 August 2020 - Present	Incumbent
