= Islamic Scientific Manuscripts Initiative =

Catalogs Islamic scientific manuscripts

- Abbreviation: ISMI
- Type: Digital humanities project
- Purpose: Research in the history of the mathematical sciences in the Islamic world
- Region served: Worldwide
- Official language: Arabic, Persian, Turkish, and other languages
- Parent organization: Max Planck Institute for the History of Science
- Website: ISMI

The Islamic Scientific Manuscripts Initiative (ISMI) (Arabic: مبادرة المخطوطات العلمية الإسلامية) is an online database that supports research on mathematics history in the Islamic world to 1350 CE. The initiative aims to provide accessible information on all Islamic manuscripts in the exact sciences, including astronomy, mathematics, theories, mathematical geography, music, mechanics, and related subjects.

It is an initiative of the Max Planck Institute for the History of Science (MPIWG), which is dedicated to advancing scientific knowledge and research.
