= Zohra Ansari =

Indian freedom fighter (1915 – 1988)

- बेगम ज़ोहरा अंसारी
- Born: 1915; Delhi, India
- Died: 28 July 1988 (aged 72–73); England
- Occupations: activist, freedom fighter.
- Spouse: Shaukatullah Shah Ansari
- Relatives: Mukhtar Ahmed Ansari (uncle)

Zohra Ansari (Urdu: بیگم زہرہ انصاری, Hindi: बेगम ज़ोहरा अंसारी, 1915–1988) was an Indian activist and freedom fighter. Mahatma Gandhi affectionately called her Vasthad Bi.

== Early life ==
Born in Delhi, originally from Yusufpur, Ghazipur, to Mohammad Asghar Ansari and Ayesha Bibi but, was raised by her uncle and aunt, freedom fighters Dr. Mukhtar Ahmed Ansari and Begum Shamsunnisa Ansari. She was born into an influential family known as the Ansaris' of Yusufpur.

== Life ==
She was a key figure in the National Movement, with her parents hosting leaders, activists, and scholars at their residence 'Dar-us-Salam'. The spaciousness of their home resembled that of a royal palace. She dedicated herself to Wardha Ashram for an extended period, where Mahatma Gandhi recognized her proficiency in Urdu and sought to learn from her. Referring to her as 'Vastad Bi' and 'Beti' in his letters, Gandhi valued her insights.

The correspondence between her and Mahatma Gandhi covered a range of topics. In a letter dated 22 December 1932, Gandhi expressed his anticipation of Zohra's weekly letters. When Zohra expressed her eagerness to join the National Movement by going to jail like her parents, Gandhi advised her to be patient and assured her of the opportunity to do so.

== Personal life ==
She married Dr. Shaukatulla Shah Ansari, who was both her relative and a prominent figure in the Indian National Movement. She experienced the loss of her father in 1936 and her mother in 1938.

== Death ==
She died on 28 July 1988 in England.
