= Mehdi Siraj Ansari =

- Born: Tehran
- Died: 1961; Tehran, Iran
- Other name: Ayatollah Haj Mehdi Siraj Ansari

Mehdi Siraj Ansari (Persian:مهدی سراج انصاری), (ad: 1895–1961) was involved with cultural-political elements in the period of Mohammad Reza Pahlavi. He was the founder of Muslim Union.

== Biography ==
Born in 1895, he was the son of Ayatollah Abdul Rahim Ansari Jaberi, and a student of Akhund Khorasani. He traveled to Tabriz in 1922, where he began his studies. After completing his training, he worked in advertising. He also traveled to Iraq and worked in Kadhimiya with people like Seyyed Hiba al-Shahristani. In 1943 he traveled to Tehran and remained there until his death in 1961.

== Press activities ==
Mehdi Ansari was a guiding force in the field of Islamic publication. He became part of the movement "Combat Against Irreligion" in 1944. He founded the Muslim League in 1945.

== Death ==
He died in August 1961 of a heart attack.
