= Mohammad Ansari =

Mohammad Ansari or Mohammed Ansari may refer to:

- Mohammad Ansari (cricketer), Pakistani cricketer
- Mohammad Ansari (footballer) (born 1991), Iranian football defender
- Mohammad Abbas Ansari (1936–2022), political leader and Shia cleric from Indian-administered Jammu and Kashmir
- Mohammad Bagher Ansari (born 1946), Iranian Twelver Shi'a Islamic theologian, Islamic law scholar and philosopher
- Mohammad Ebrahim Ansari (1936–2011), Iraqi Twelver Shi'a Marja
- Mohammad H. Ansari, Canadian theoretical physicist
- Mohammad Hamid Ansari (born 1937), 12th Vice President of India
- Mohammed Jaber Al-Ansari (born 1939), Bahraini philosopher and political thinker
- Mohammad Jasmir Ansari (born 1968), Indian politician, Member of the Legislative Assembly
- Muhammad Latif Ansari (1887–1979), Pakistani Shia Muslim scholar, poet, historian, and cleric who emigrated to Kenya
- Mohammad Yusuf Ansari (born 1958), Indian politician in Uttar Pradesh
- Mohammed Yusuf Ansari (born 1970), Indian footballer for the national team
