= Rais Ansari =

Urdu Indian poet (born 1951)

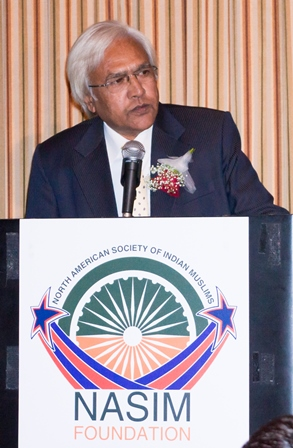
- Rais Ansari attending function in North America, society of Indian Muslims
- Born: Syed Abdul Qavi; 20 March 1951 (age 75); Lucknow, Uttar Pradesh, India
- Occupation: Poet
- Years active: 1970–2026 Died on 27.01.2026

Syed Abdul Qavi (born 1951 in Lucknow, India), better known by his stage name Rais Ansari (or Rayees Ansari), is an Urdu Indian poet who has performed at the Indian poetic festivals and at festivals in New Delhi and Qatar.
