= Karampur =

- Deh
- Location in Sindh Karampur (Pakistan)
- Coordinates: 26.466194°N 67.846169°E
- Country: Pakistan
- Region: Sindh
- District: Jamshoro
- Taluka: Sehwan

Population (2017)
  - Total: 7,303
- Time zone: UTC+5 (PST)
  - Summer (DST): UTC+6 (PDT)

Karampur is a village and deh in Sehwan taluka of Jamshoro District, Sindh. Said to have been founded by the Talpur dynasty ruler Mir Karam Ali Talpur, it is located just north of Sehwan on the road to Larkano. The village contains the shrine of Hussain Shah, a Muslim saint who was buried here in the early 20th century.

As of 2017, Karampur has a population of 7,303, in 1,436 households. It belongs to the tappedar circle of Channa.

Around 1874, Karampur was described as a predominantly agricultural village with a small police thana. Its population was estimated to be about 1,000 people, including about 850 Muslims (mostly Utas) and 150 Hindus (mostly Lohanos). Local trade included various types of grain, ghee, milk, and butter, while the goods manufactured in Karampur mainly consisted of coarse cloth and shoes.

The 1951 census recorded the village of Karampur as having an estimated population of about 1,990, in about 350 houses. It had a school at that point.

In the 1990s, in order to combat waterlogging and increasing soil salinity on the right (west) bank of the Indus, a major drainage channel called the Right Bank Outfall Drain was planned to discharge into the Indus at Karampur. After a major backlash from local residents, however, the plan was changed to discharge the channel directly into the Arabian Sea.
