= Faridul Haq Ansari =

Indian Lawyer

Member of Parliament, Rajya Sabha
- In office 3 April 1958 – 2 April 1964

Member of Parliament, Rajya Sabha
- In office 3 April 1964 – 4 April 1966

Personal details
- Born: 1 July 1895 Yusufpur, Ghazipur, India
- Died: 4 April 1966 (aged 70) New Delhi
- Relations: Nezamul Haq Ansari (father); Mukhtar Ahmed Ansari (cousin) Hamid Ansari Mukhtar Ansari
- Children: Zaheer Ul Haq Ansari
- Education: St. Stephen's College, Delhi, University of Oxford, England
- Occupation: Barrister, politician

Faridul Haq Ansari (Urdu:فرید الحق انصاری)(1 July 1895 – 4 April 1966), popularly known as Farid Ansari, was a lawyer and politician who actively participated in Indian independence movement. He was a prominent socialist leader who got special mention in Jayprakash Narayan's writings. He served two terms as Member of Parliament in Rajya Sabha.

== Early life ==
Faridul Haq Ansari was born in 1895 in Yusufpur town of Ghazipur district of Uttar Pradesh. His father Nezamul Haq Ansari was a zamindar. Faridul Haq Ansari was a descendant of an illustrious family of Ansari sheikhs who settled in south asia in 1526, he traced his lineage to the sufi saint of Herat Abdullah Ansari. Faridul Haq got his education at St. Stephen's College, Delhi, Aligarh Muslim University and Oxford University. After returning to India he started practicing as lawyer at Delhi High Court in 1925. He joined Indian National Congress in 1927 and served as the Secretary of Delhi Pradesh Congress Committee. He was cousin of former president of Indian National Congress Mukhtar Ahmed Ansari.

== Career ==
Faridul Haq actively participated in Indian independence movement and got arrested many times. He was one of the prominent leader of Quit India Movement who was sent to jail during 1942–1945. As a barrister he pleaded the defense in Meerut Conspiracy Case Trail (1929–33) along with Jawahar Lal Nehru and Kailash Nath Katju as a member of Central defence Committee setup by the Congress Working Committee. Within Congress Party he was known for his left-leaning. He was elected as the member of policy and programme drafting committee of Congress Socialist Party.

After India's independence he joined Socialist party (India) and became the member of its national executive. In the year of 1952 he became the member of Praja Socialist Party and served as the Joint Secretary of Praja Socialist Party during 1954–1958. In 1952 at the invitation of Marshal Tito he led a delegation of socialist leaders to Yugoslavia, which included Karpoori Thakur, Banke Bihari Das, Shanti Narayan Naik and Madhu Dandavate.

Faridul Haq along with Asaf Ali made a major contribution for expansion of Congress Party. They initiated mass contact campaign which resulted in many Muslims joining the Congress Party and deserting the membership of Muslim League. After independence Faridul Haq served two terms as the Member of Parliament in Rajya Sabha between 1958 and 1966. He died on 4 April 1966 in Delhi due to coronary thrombosis.

== Position held ==
- Secretary, Delhi Pradesh Congress Committee, 1927
- Secretary, Praja Socialist Party, 1954–58
- Member of Parliament (Rajya Sabha), 1958–64
- Member of Parliament (Rajya Sabha), 1964–66
