= Shailendra Singh (police officer) =

Indian police chief

Shailendra Singh is a former Deputy Superintendent of Police (DSP) of Uttar Pradesh Police in India. Following his 2004 resignation, the Congress Party appointed him the chair of its Right to Information Task Force for the province of Uttar Pradesh.

Singh was arrested in September 2008. Authorities claimed he had been arrested while he tried to lead a gang in ransacking the offices of the State Information Commission. Political colleagues asserted he had been arrested in his own home, at 1:30am, and that his arrest was politically motivated. Singh was released on bail on 2008, October 2.
