= Quami Ekta Dal =

- Founded: 2010
- Dissolved: 2017
- Merged into: Bahujan Samaj Party
- Colours: Green
- Alliance: Ekta Manch

Election symbol

Quami Ekta Dal, (Hindi: कौमी एकता दल; English: Religious Unity Party; abbreviated QED) was a regional party in Uttar Pradesh, India, founded in 2010. The QED's president was Afzal Ansari and was affiliated with Ekta Manch of Indian national Congress.

The QED managed to muster 354,578 votes of Muslims in the 2014 Indian general election.

The QED merged with the Samajwadi Party of Mulayam Singh on 21 June 2016. The Samajwadi Party parliamentary board, however, cancelled the merger and revoked the expulsion of the Balram Yadav from the cabinet. On 26 January 2017, the QED merged with the Bahujan Samaj Party.
