= Afzal Ansari =

Indian politician (born 1953)

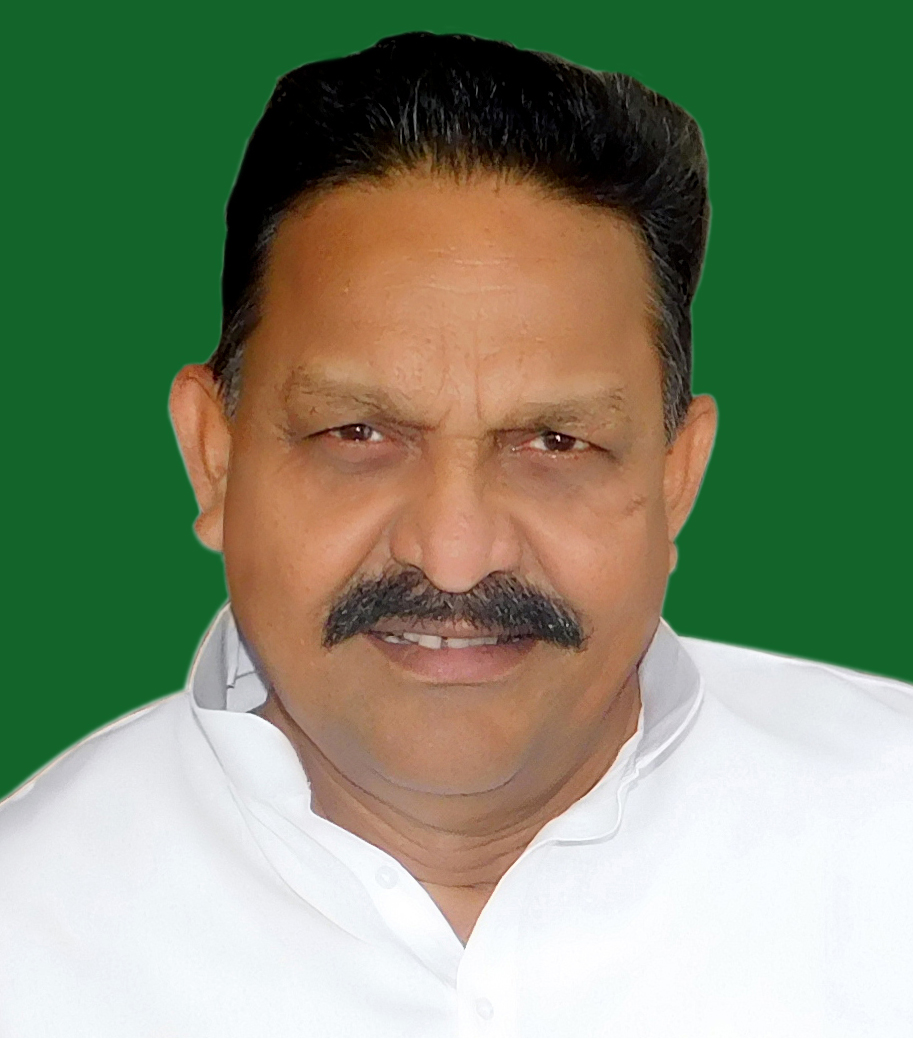
- Official portrait, 2019

Member of Parliament, Lok Sabha
- Incumbent
- Assumed office 23 May 2019
- Preceded by: Manoj Sinha
- Constituency: Ghazipur, Uttar Pradesh
- In office 22 May 2004 – 16 May 2009
- Preceded by: Manoj Sinha
- Succeeded by: Radhe Mohan Singh
- Constituency: Ghazipur, Uttar Pradesh

Member of Uttar Pradesh Legislative Assembly
- In office 1985–2002
- Preceded by: Sarju Pandey
- Succeeded by: Krishnanand Rai
- Constituency: Mohammadabad

Personal details
- Born: 14 August 1953 (age 73) Yusufpur, Uttar Pradesh, India
- Party: Samajwadi Party
- Other political affiliations: Quami Ekta Dal; Bahujan Samaj Party; Communist Party of India
- Spouse: Farhat Ansari (m. 1991)
- Relations: Mukhtar Ansari (brother); Sibgatullah Ansari (brother); Hamid Ansari (Uncle); Mukhtar Ahmed Ansari (grandfather); Abbas Ansari (nephew); Umar Ansari (Nephew)
- Children: 3
- Parents: Subhanullah Ansari (father); Begum Rabia (mother)
- Education: Deen Dayal Upadhyay Gorakhpur University
- Profession: Politician

Afzal Ansari (born 14 August 1953) is an Indian politician of the Samajwadi Party and the incumbent Member of Parliament (MP) of India for Ghazipur constituency, Uttar Pradesh, having won the Lok Sabha election from the constituency in 2024. He has been MLA for five consecutive term and MP for three.

== Early life ==
Afzal Ansari was born in Yusufpur–Mohammadabad town in Ghazipur district, Uttar Pradesh to Subhanullah Ansari and Begum Rabia. He received his school education. For higher studies, he enrolled in the local post-graduate college and completed Post Graduation from the University of Gorakhpur.

== Family ==
Afzal Ansari's father Subhanullah Ansari was the chairman of Nagar Palika Parishad, Mohammadabad, and was elected unopposed. His grandfather Mukhtar Ahmed Ansari served as the president (1926–1927) of the All-India Muslim League, as well as the Indian National Congress (INC), and was one of the founders of the Jamia Millia Islamia, New Delhi.

Former Vice President of India Mohammad Hamid Ansari is Afzal Ansari's cousin.

Afzal Ansari is married to Farhat Ansari since 26 October 1991 and the couple have 3 daughters.

Ansari's elder brother Sibgatullah Ansari and his younger brother Mukhtar Ansari both were involved in politics and became MLA's in different constituencies.

== Political career ==
=== Member of Legislative Assembly ===
Ansari started his political career with the Communist Party of India. He contested Uttar Pradesh Legislative Assembly election in 1985 for the first time and defeated Abhay Narayan Rai from Indian National Congress with a margin of 3,064 votes. From 1985 to 2002, Ansari served five terms as Member of the Legislative Assembly for Mohammadabad Assembly constituency.

=== Member of Parliament ===
Afzal Ansari contested the 2004 Lok Sabha general election on the Samajwadi Party ticket and defeated Manoj Sinha of the Bharatiya Janata Party with a margin of 226,777 votes. He contested the 2009 general election on the Samajwadi Party (SP) ticket for Ghazipur but lost to the Bhartiya Janta Party's Radhe Mohan Singh.

After some political differences, Ansari left the Samajwadi Party and founded a new political party called Quami Ekta Dal and served as its Secretary-General before merging it with Samajwadi Party. Ansari rejoined the SP in 2019 and contested the general election in Ghazipur; he won the seat, becoming the 17th Lok Sabha member from Ghazipur.

On 1 May 2023, Ansari was disqualified as a Member of Parliament following being given a 4 year jail sentence. His suspension was revoked on 15 December 2023 by the Supreme Court of India.

== Positions held ==
Afzal Ansari has been elected 5 times as MLA and 3 times as Lok Sabha MP.

#	From	To	Position	Political party
1.	1985	1989	MLA (1st term) from Mohammadabad	Communist Party of India
2.	1989	1991	MLA (2nd term) from Mohammadabad	Communist Party of India
3.	1991	1993	MLA (3rd term) from Mohammadabad	Communist Party of India
4.	1993	1996	MLA (4th term) from Mohammadabad	Communist Party of India
5.	1996	2002	MLA (5th term) from Mohammadabad	Samajwadi Party
6.	2004	2009	MP (1st term) in 14th Lok Sabha from Ghazipur	Samajwadi Party
7.	2019	2024	MP (2nd term) in 17th Lok Sabha from Ghazipur (Note: Disqualified in May 2023, but suspension revoked on 15 December 2023.)	Bahujan Samaj Party
8.	2024	--	MP (3rd term) in 18th Lok Sabha from Ghazipur	Samajwadi Party

== Criminal cases ==
After inaugurating a cricket tournament in 2005, MLA Krishnanand Rai's cavalcade was ambushed while he was returning home. Krishnanand Rai and six of his aides were killed by AK-47 bullet fires. Both Ansari (Mukhtar Ansari and Afzal Ansari) brothers were booked under Gangster act in connection with murder of BJP legislator Krishnanand Rai in November 2005 and kidnapping-murder of trader from Varanasi in 1997.

On 1 May 2023, Ansari was disqualified as a Member of Parliament following being given a 4-year jail sentence. His suspension was revoked on 15 December 2023 by the Supreme Court of India.
