= Mukhtar Ansari =

Indian politician (1963–2024)

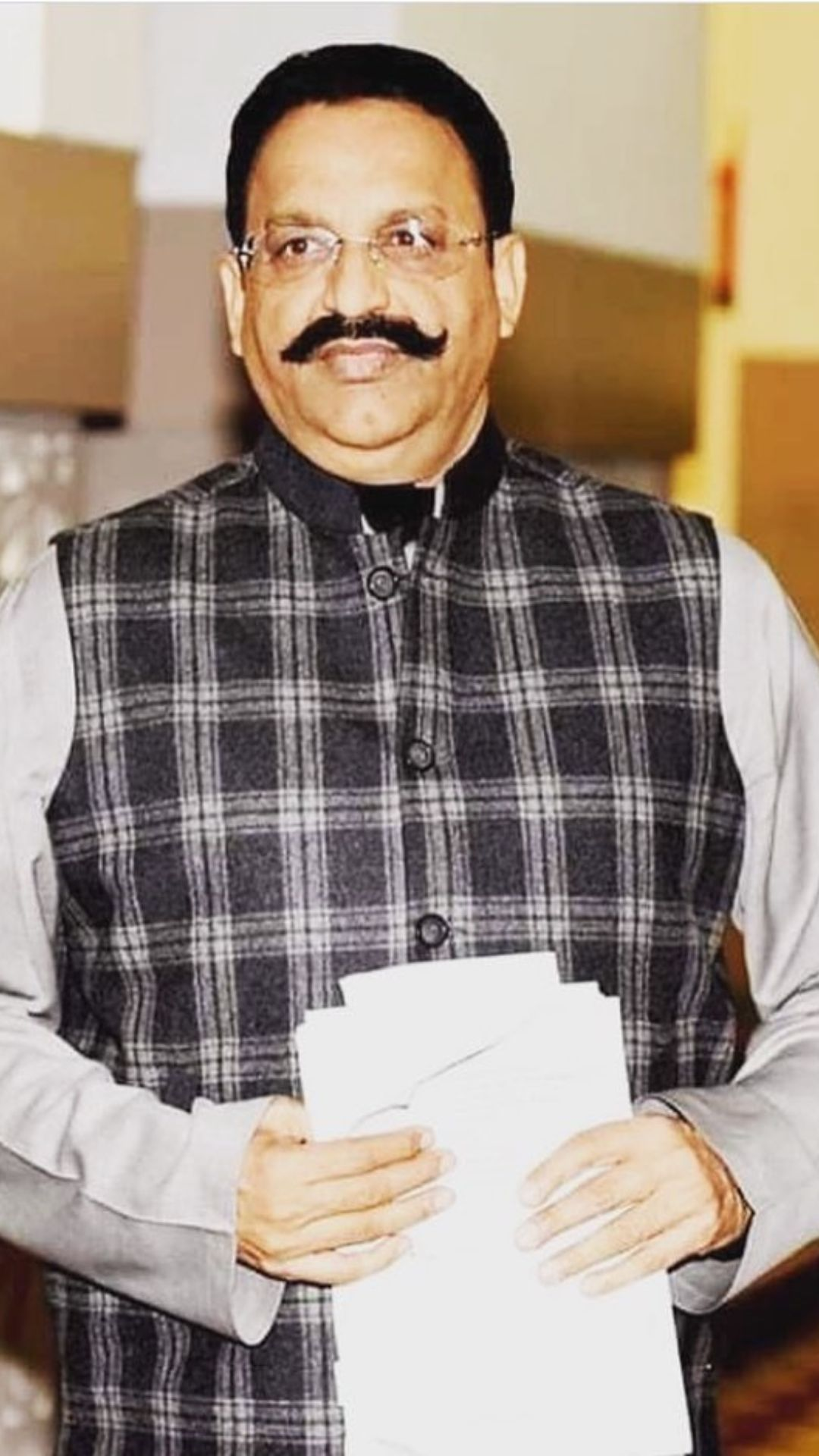
- Mukhtar Ansari

Member of Uttar Pradesh Legislative Assembly
- In office October 1996 – March 2022
- Preceded by: Naseem
- Succeeded by: Abbas Ansari
- Constituency: Mau

Personal details
- Born: 30 June 1963 Ghazipur, Uttar Pradesh, India
- Died: 28 March 2024 (aged 60) Banda district, Uttar Pradesh, India
- Party: Quami Ekta Dal
- Other political affiliations: Bahujan Samaj Party
- Spouse: Afsa Ansari (m. 1989)
- Relations: Sibgatullah Ansari (brother); Afzal Ansari (brother); Mukhtar Ahmed Ansari (grandfather); Hamid Ansari (Uncle)
- Children: 2 (including Abbas Ansari Umar Ansari)
- Parent: Subhanullah Ansari (father)
- Education: Post Graduate College, Ghazipur
- Occupation: Politician

Mukhtar Ansari (30 June 1963 – 28 March 2024) was an Indian gangster and politician, based in Uttar Pradesh. He was elected as a Member of the Legislative Assembly from the Mau constituency five times, including twice as a Bahujan Samaj Party candidate.

== Background and family ==
Ansari's paternal grandfather was Mukhtar Ahmed Ansari, a surgeon, and an early president of the Indian National Congress in 1927 and of All-India Muslim League in 1918 and 1920. His father was Subhan Ullah Ansari, who was a leader of the Communist Party. Mukhtar Ansari's grand-uncle was Mohammad Usman, who was a brigadier in the Indian Army; he never married and remained bachelor all his life.

Ansari's family claim patrilineal lineage from the 11th century Sufi saint Abdullah Ansari of Herat in Afghanistan, who was a direct descendant of Abu Ayyub al-Ansari, a companion of the Islamic prophet Muhammad.

== Early life ==
In the early 1970s, the government commissioned several development projects in the Purvanchal area (eastern part of Uttar Pradesh). This resulted in the rise of organised gangs that competed with each other to grab the contracts for these projects. Ansari was originally an alleged member of the Makhanu Singh gang. In the 1980s, this gang clashed with another gang led by Sahib Singh over a plot of land in Saidpur, resulting in a series of violent incidents. Brijesh Singh, an alleged member of Sahib Singh's gang, later formed his own gang and took over Ghazipur's contract work mafia in the 1990s. Ansari's gang competed with Brijesh Singh for the control of the ₹100 crore contract business, which spanned areas such as coal mining, railway construction, scrap disposal, public works, and the liquor business. The gangs were also allegedly involved in running protection ("goonda tax") and extortion rackets, besides other criminal activities such as kidnapping.

== Early political career ==
Ansari entered politics around 1995 through a student union at Government PG College, Ghazipur, became an MLA in 1996, and started challenging Brijesh Singh's dominance. The two became the main gang rivals in the Poorvanchal region. In 2002, Singh allegedly ambushed Ansari's convoy. Three of Ansari's men were killed in the resulting shootout. Brijesh Singh was critically injured and presumed dead. To counter Ansari's political influence, Singh supported the election campaign of the BJP leader Krishnanand Rai. Rai defeated Ansari's brother and five-time MLA Afzal Ansari from Mohammadabad in the 2002 Uttar Pradesh Assembly elections. Mukhtar Ansari later claimed that Rai used his political office to award all the contracts to Brijesh Singh's gang, and the two planned to eliminate him.

Ansari capitalised on the Muslim voter bank to secure his electoral triumph during the Ghazipur-Mau area elections. The amalgamation of crime, politics, and religion instigated several outbreaks of communal violence within the region. Consequently, Ansari faced charges of inciting violence following one such riot. He was subsequently acquitted of these charges by the court.

While Ansari was lodged in jail, Krishnanand Rai was shot dead in public along with his six aides after Special Task Force officers warned him of hired killers at the residence of Mukhtar Ansari. The attackers fired over 400 bullets from six AK-47 rifles; 67 bullets were recovered from the seven bodies with the help of Ramashrey Giri. Shashikant Rai, an important witness in the case, was found dead under mysterious circumstances in 2006. He had identified Ansari and Bajrangi's shooters, Angad Rai and Gora Rai, as the two gunmen who attacked Rai's convoy. The police dismissed his death as a suicide. Ansari's rival, Brijesh Singh, escaped from the Ghazipur-Mau area after Rai's murder. He was later arrested in 2008 in Orissa, and later entered politics as a member of the Pragatisheel Manav Samaj Party.

In 2008, Ansari was booked for ordering an attack on Dharmendra Singh, a witness in a murder case. However, later, the victim submitted an affidavit requesting the proceedings against Ansari be dropped. On 27 September 2017, Ansari was acquitted of murder.

== Bahujan Samaj Party ==
Ansari and his brother Afzal joined the Bahujan Samaj Party (BSP) in 2007. The party allowed them in after they claimed that they had been framed in criminal cases for fighting against the "feudal system" and promised to refrain from participating in any crimes. The BSP chief Mayawati portrayed Mukhtar Ansari as Robin Hood and called him "a messiah of the poor". Ansari fought the 2009 Lok Sabha elections from Varanasi on the BSP ticket while still lodged in the jail. He lost to BJP's Murli Manohar Joshi by a margin of 17,211 votes; he received 27.94% of the votes, compared to Joshi's 30.52%.

Ansari and two other people were charged for the murder of Kapil Dev Singh in April 2009. The police also found that he had ordered the murder of a contractor, Ajay Prakash Singh in August 2009. In 2010, Ansari was booked for the murder of Ram Singh Maurya. Maurya was a witness to the murder of Mannat Singh, a local contractor allegedly killed by Ansari's gang in 2009.

The two brothers were expelled by the BSP in 2010 after the party realized that they were still involved in criminal activities. A raid at Ghazipur jail, where he was lodged, revealed that Mukhtar was living a luxurious life: items like air coolers and cooking equipment were found from his cell. He was shifted to the Mathura prison soon after the raid.

In 2004, an FIR was logged by DSP Shailendra Singh against Mukhtar Ansari under POTA after recovering a light machine gun (LMG) from his premises. DSP Shailendra Singh was later implicated in the fake case of vandalism for recommending the arrest after falling out with the then ruling Samajwadi Party government led by Mulayam Singh Yadav in Uttar Pradesh. The former DSP was exonerated from fake case by the Yogi Adithyanath Government in 2021.

== Quami Ekta Dal ==
After being expelled from the BSP and being rejected by other political parties, the three Ansari brothers (Mukhtar, Afzal, and Sibkatillah) formed their own political party called the Quami Ekta Dal (QED), in 2010. Earlier, Mukhtar had launched an outfit called the Hindu Muslim Ekta Party, which was merged with QED. In 2012, he was charged under the Maharashtra Control of Organised Crime Act for being a member of an organised crime syndicate.

In March 2014, Ansari announced that he would contest the 2014 Lok Sabha elections against Narendra Modi from Varanasi and lost there with by a huge margin, besides contesting from Ghosi. However, in April, he withdrew his candidature stating that he wanted to prevent the division of "secular votes".

== Back in the BSP ==
On 26 January 2016, Ansari rejoined the Bahujan Samaj Party (BSP) before the 2017 Uttar Pradesh Legislative elections. There was widespread speculation about the Ansari brothers joining the Samajwadi party a couple of months before. BSP chief Mayawati defended his entry into the party, stating that the criminal charges against Ansari had not been proven, and that the party gives people a chance to reform themselves.

Eventually, Ansari merged his Quami Ekta Dal with the BSP in 2017 and won the state elections as a BSP candidate from the Mau assembly seat. He defeated his nearest rival, Mahendra Rajbhar of the Suheldev Bharatiya Samaj Party (a BJP ally) by 6464 votes.

== Electoral performance ==
=== Uttar Pradesh Legislative Assembly ===
Year	Constituency	Party	Votes	%	Opponent	Party	Votes	%	Margin	Margin in %	Results
1996	Mau	BSP	67,731	46.85	Vijay Pratap Singh	BJP	41,758	28.89	25,973	17.96	Won
2002	Mau	Independent	70,687	46.06	Sita	SP	37,645	24.53	33,042	21.53	Won
2007	Mau	Independent	70,226	46.78	Vijay Pratap	BSP	63,208	42.10	7,018	4.68	Won
2012	Mau	QED	70,210	31.24	Bheem Rajbhar	BSP	64,306	28.61	5,904	2.63	Won
2017	Mau	BSP	96,793	36.39	Mahendra Rajbhar	SBSP	88,095	33.12%	8,698	3.27	Won

=== Lok Sabha ===
Year	Constituency	Party	Votes	%	Opponent	Party	Votes	%	Margin	Margin in %	Results
2009	Varanasi	BSP	185,911	27.94	Murli Manohar Joshi	BJP	203,122	30.52	-17,211	-2.58	Lost
2014	Ghosi	QED	166,443	16.01	Harinarayan Rajbhar	BJP	379,797	36.52	-2,13,354	-20.51	Lost

== Criminal cases ==
After inaugurating a cricket tournament in 2005, MLA Krishnanand Rai's cavalcade was ambushed while he was returning home. Krishnanand Rai and six of his aides were killed by AK-47 bullet fires. Ansari was acquitted of the murder in 2019.

Ansari was in jail from 2005 in Uttar Pradesh and Punjab states for another criminal case. Mukhtar Ansari was awarded a life sentence on 13 March 2024 in connection with a fake arms licence case.

== Death ==
On 28 March 2024, while in prison, Ansari died of a heart attack, at the age of 60. An autopsy carried out by the panel of doctors from AIIMS Delhi over his body confirmed that Ansari died of a heart attack. His son, Umar Ansari, has claimed that his father was given a slow poison that led to the heart attack. 10 days prior to his death, on 19 March 2024, Mukhtar Ansari reported to the Barabanki Court that he was experiencing continuous pain in his nerves and limbs. He attributed this discomfort to some poisonous substance he claimed had been introduced into his food. The Uttar Pradesh government ordered a three-member magisterial investigation into the allegations.

=== Reaction ===
Krishnanand Rai's son, Piyush Rai, in an interview, stated "God has considered his fate in the month of Ramzan," and termed Mukhtar Ansari a "tyrant." Akhilesh Yadav, the leader of the Samajwadi Party, has urged that a judge of the Supreme Court look into Mukhtar Ansari's death.

Asaduddin Owaisi: "Mukhtar Ansari was in judicial custody, and he was killed by giving poison. He is a martyr, don't call him dead. It was the responsibility of the BJP govt to protect him."

Akhilesh Yadav: Samajwadi Party (SP) president Akhilesh Yadav on Sunday visited the family of Ansari at his ancestral house in Mohammadabad Yusufpur town of Ghazipur district and offered condolences. Praising the Ansari family for its contribution in India’s freedom struggle, Yadav questioned the circumstances under which the former five-time MLA died, and hoped truth would come out and the family would get justice. “Mukhtar Ansari himself said he was being poisoned and that is what has come to light. We hope that the government will bring out the truth and the family will get justice. Ever since the BJP government has come to power, trust in institutions has decreased,”Yadav told reporters. He added, “Did Mukhtar Ansari’s grandfather not contribute to the country’s independence? Are the administration and the government not discriminating? Will we accept that it was a natural death?”

== See also ==
- Vohra Report on criminalisation of politics in India
- Mafia Raj
- Rent-seeking
