= Mukhtar Ahmed Ansari =

Indian Freedom fighter and political leader (1880–1936)

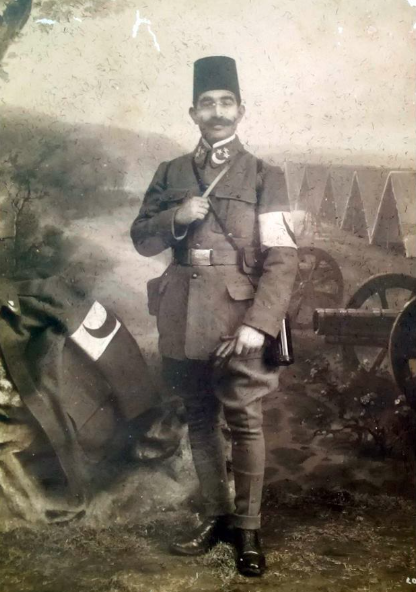

President of the Indian National Congress
- In office 1927–1928
- Preceded by: S. Srinivasa Iyengar
- Succeeded by: Motilal Nehru

Chancellor of Jamia Millia Islamia
- In office 1928–1936
- Preceded by: Hakim Ajmal Khan
- Succeeded by: Abdul Majeed Khwaja

President of the All-India Muslim League
- In office 1920–1921
- Preceded by: Hakim Ajmal Khan
- Succeeded by: Maulana Hasrat Mohani

Personal details
- Born: 25 December 1880 Mohammadabad, North-Eastern Provinces, British India
- Died: 10 May 1936 (aged 55) Delhi, British India
- Cause of death: Heart attack
- Resting place: Jamia Millia Islamia
- Party: Indian National Congress, All-India Muslim League
- Children: Zohra Ansari
- Education: Madras Medical College (M.D, M.S); University of Edinburgh (ChM)
- Occupation: Physician, politician, activist
- Known for: Founder of Jamia Millia Islamia, Indian independence movement, president of the Indian National Congress, president of the All-India Muslim League

Mukhtar Ahmed Ansari (25 December 1880 – 10 May 1936) was an Indian nationalist and political leader, and former president of the Indian National Congress and the Muslim League during the Indian Independence Movement. He was one of the founders of Jamia Millia Islamia University. He remained its chancellor from 1928 to 1936.

== Early life and medical career ==
Mukhtar Ahmed Ansari was born on 25 December 1880 in Yusufpur-Mohammadabad town in eastern Uttar Pradesh).

He hailed from an influential and famous family of Qazis' and Zamindars known as the Ansaris of Yusufpur. The family was descended from the Sufi saint of Herat, Abdullah Ansari, and had migrated to India with the Mughal emperor Babur in 1526.

Educated at the Victoria School, Ansari and his family moved to Hyderabad. Ansari obtained a medical degree from the Madras Medical College and went to England on scholarship studies. He achieved the M.D. and M.S. degrees in 1905. In 1910 Ansari earned a Master of Surgery (ChM) from the University of Edinburgh for his thesis Treatment of syphilis by arylarsonates with special reference to recent research. He was a top-class student and worked at the London Lock Hospital and the Charing Cross Hospital in London. He was an Indian pioneer in surgery, and today there is an Ansari Ward in the Charing Cross Hospital, London, in honour of his work.

From 1921 to 1935, Ansari visited Vienna, Paris, Lucerne and London to meet with famed urologists, including Robert Lichtenstern, Eugen Steinach and Serge Voronoff, some of the pioneers of grafting animal testicles onto humans. In the last decade of his life, Ansari performed over 700 such grafting operations, meticulously recording 440 of them. From these experiments he published his book Regeneration of Man, which he shared with his close friend Mahatma Gandhi.

== Nationalist activities ==
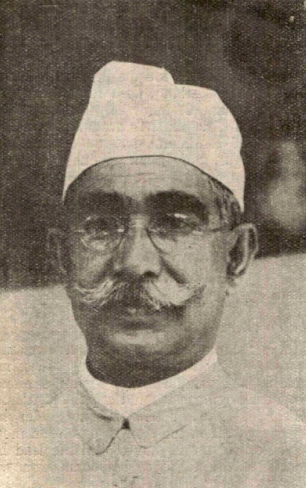

In 1898, being a student in Madras, Ansari attended his first All India Congress Session, which was presided over by Ananda Mohan Bose. In 1927, when the Sessions were held again in Madras, Ansari presided over the session.

Dr. Ansari became involved in the Indian Independence Movement during his stay in England. He moved back to Delhi and joined both the Indian Congress and the Muslim League. He played an important role in the negotiation of the 1916 Lucknow Pact and served as the Muslim League's president in 1918 and 1920. He was an outspoken supporter of the Khilafat movement, and led the Indian medical mission to treat the wounded Turkish soldiers during the Balkan Wars. In March 1920, he led a Khilafat Delegation that was sent to England. This delegation made speeches, met with cabinet ministers and the prime minister Lloyd George.

Ansari served several terms as the general secretary of All India Congress Committee (AICC) and the president of the Indian National Congress during its 1927 session. As a result of in-fighting and political divisions within the League in the 1920s, and later the rise of Muhammad Ali Jinnah and Muslim separatism, Ansari drew closer to Mahatma Gandhi and the Congress Party. When he became the president of the Indian National Congress in 1927 on the invitation of Mahatma Gandhi, he spent all of his wealth for the Indian National Congress activities, which left him almost bankrupt. He spent his later life writing and developing the Jamia Milia Islamia.

Ansari was one of the founders of Jamia Millia Islamia university and also served as the chancellor of the Jamia Millia Islamia university in Delhi, soon after the death of its primary founder, Hakim Ajmal Khan in 1927.

== Personal life ==
Ansari lived in a palatial house, called the Darus Salaam or Abode of peace, which was the Delhi manor of the Ansari family. Mahatma Gandhi was a frequent guest when he visited Delhi, and the house was a regular base for Congress political activities.

Ansari died in 1936 en route from Mussoorie to Delhi on a train due to a heart attack. He is buried within the premises of Jamia Millia Islamia, a university in New Delhi.

=== Progeny ===
Many members of Ansari's family remained in India after partition in 1947, while others moved to Pakistan. Those who remained in India received patronage from the Nehru-Gandhi family and became prominent politicians and leading lights of the Congress party. They demonstrated pugnacious street fighter characteristics and flourished in the politics of Uttar Pradesh.

Ansari's immediate family members include:

- Daughter: Zohra Ansari, freedom fighter
- Qazi Faridul Haq Ansari, MP Rajya Sabha
- Shaukatullah Shah Ansari, former MP And Governor of Odisa
- Abdul Aziz Ansari, freedom fighter and founder of Ansari Memorial Society
- Grandson: Afzal Ansari, former MLA and MP
- Grandson: Mukhtar Ansari, gangster turned politician from Uttar Pradesh

Ansari's other relatives include:

- Grand-nephew: Mohammad Hamid Ansari, former vice president of India

== Honours ==
Ansari Road in Daryaganj, old Delhi was named after him. Ansari Nagar near AIIMS, New Delhi was also named after him. The auditorium and the hospital of Jamia Millia Islamia were named after him as well.
