= Bilaniyasar =

Village in Rajasthan, India

- Village
- Location within Rajasthan Location within India
- Coordinates: 27.6164°N 73.8685°E
- Country: India
- State: Rajasthan
- District: Bikaner
- Sub-District: Jasrasar

Government
  - Type: Panchayati Raj
  - Body: Gram Panchayat

Area
  - Total: 20.62 km^{2} (7.96 sq mi)

Population (2011)
  - Total: 1,388

Language
  - Official Language: Hindi
- Time zone: UTC+5:30 (IST)
- PIN: 334802
- Vehicle registration: RJ-50, RJ-07

Bilaniyasar is a village located in Jasrasar Tehsil of Bikaner District, Rajasthan, India.

People residing in this village rely on agriculture, consists both irrigated and non-irrigated farming.

== Demographics ==
According to the 2011 Census, conducted by the Government of India, the population of this village was 1,388, out of which 721 were males and 667 were females. The literacy rate was 52.67%.

Inhabitants of this village follows Hinduism.

Religion in Bilaniyasar village (2011)
Religion	Percent
Hinduism	100%
Distribution of religions in Bilaniyasar Village

Bagri is the most spoken language here. Hindi, and English are officially used languages.

Languages of Bilaniyasar village(2011)
1. Bagri (96.0%)
2. Hindi (2.50%)
3. English (1.50%)

Pin Code (Postal Index Number Code) of this village is 334802.

== Transportation ==
Transport facilities in this village are good. This village is located near SH-20, and SH-20(B).

== See also ==
- Dudawas
- Gajsukhdesar
- Jasrasar
