= Lalamdesar Chhota =

Village in Rajasthan, India

- Village
- Location in Rajasthan, India Lalamdesar Chhota (India)
- Coordinates: 27.8589°N 73.7590°E
- Country: India
- State: Rajasthan
- District: Bikaner
- Sub-District: Jasrasar
- Assembly Constituency: Dungargarh

Government
  - Type: Panchayati Raj
  - Body: Gram Panchayat

Area
  - Total: 21.21 km^{2} (8.19 sq mi)

Population (2011)
  - Total: 2,525

Language
  - Official Language: Hindi
- Time zone: UTC+5:30 (IST)
- PIN: 334802
- Vehicle registration: RJ-50, RJ-07

Lalamdesar Chhota is a small village located in the Bikaner District, Rajasthan, India.

Inhabitants of this village majorly depend on agriculture which includes both irrigated and non-irrigated farming. Although, there're a number of population, who also involves in running other businesses.

== Demographics ==
Total population of this village is 2525, out of which male population is 1325 and female population is 1190. Literacy rate of this village is 42.97%

Population of this village follows Hinduism.

Religion in Lalamdesar Chhota Village (2011)
Religion	Percent
Hinduism	100%
Distribution of religions in Lalamdesar Chhota Village

People residing in this village mostly speaks Bagri, a dialect of Rajasthani. Hindi is the official language.

1. Bagri (97.0%)
2. Hindi (2.50%)
3. English (0.50%)

== Transportation ==
Road transport facility in this village is at good condition. Village directly connected to Bikaner-Napasar-Ladnun Highway also known as SH-20(B).

As of now, railway facility is not available in this village, inhabitants need to travel to Nokha(60 km), Bikaner(60 km), Napasar(40 km) or Dungargarh(40 km).
