= Mansoori, Rajasthan =

Village in Rajasthan, India

Mansoori
- Village
- Location within Rajasthan Location within India
- Coordinates: 27.8115°N 73.8332°E
- Country: India
- State: Rajasthan
- District: Bikaner
- Sub-District: Jasrasar
- Assembly Constituency: Dungargarh

Government
  - Type: Panchayati Raj
  - Body: Gram Panchayat

Area
  - Total: 29.39 km^{2} (11.35 sq mi)

Population (2011)
  - Total: 3,436

Language
  - Official Language: Hindi
- Time zone: UTC+5:30 (IST)
- PIN: 334802
- Vehicle registration: RJ-50, RJ-07

Mansoori is a village located in Jasrasar Tehsil of Bikaner District, Rajasthan, India.

People residing in this village basically depend on agriculture, and some inhabitants have their own businesses.

== Demographics ==
According to the 2011 census, conducted by Federal Government, the village had a total population of 3436 people, out of which 1794 was the male population and 1642 was the female population residing in this village. The Literacy rate was 43.95%.

Religion in Mansoori Village (2011)
Religion	Percent
Hinduism	99.50%
Islam	0.50%
Distribution of religions in Mansoori Village

Almost 99.5% of total inhabitants population follows Hinduism and there're some followers of Islam also.

Bagri, a dialect of Rajsthani is the most spoken language here. The village administration follows Hindi as their official language.

Languages of Mansoori village(2011)
1. Bagri (97.0%)
2. Hindi (2.90%)
3. English (0.10%)

Pin Code (Postal Index Number Code) of this village is 334802.

== Transportation ==
Mansoori is directly connected to Bikaner-Napasar-Ladnun highway, known as SH-20(B) through Road. This highway is located 6 km away from the village, although; connected via road.

As of now, there's no Railway transportation available near this village, inhabitants have to travel to Nokha(60 km) or Dungargarh(45 km) for railway transportation.
