= Thawariya =

Village in Rajasthan, India

- Village
- Location in Rajasthan, India Thawariya (India)
- Coordinates: 27.6221°N 73.7491°E
- Country: India
- State: Rajasthan
- District: Bikaner
- Sub-District: Jasrasar

Government
  - Type: Panchayati Raj
  - Body: Gram Panchayat

Area
  - Total: 42.09 km^{2} (16.25 sq mi)

Population (2011)
  - Total: 4,408

Language
  - Official Language: Hindi
- Time zone: UTC+5:30 (IST)
- PIN: 334802
- Vehicle registration: RJ-50, RJ-07

Thawariya is a village located in Jasrasar tehsil in the Bikaner district of Rajasthan, India.

== Demographics ==
According to the 2011 census conducted by the Government of India, the population of this village was 4,408, with 2,291 males and 2,117 females. The village had 699 houses, and the literacy rate was 41.27%.

99.9% of the village population follows Hinduism, with a few Muslims.

Religion in Sadhasar Village (2011)
Religion	Percent
Hinduism	99.8%
Islam	0.20%
Distribution of religions in Thawariya Village

Bagri, a dialect of Rajsthani is the most spoken language although the village administration uses Hindi.

Languages of Thawariya village(2011)
1. Bagri (96.0%)
2. Hindi (3.90%)
3. English (0.10%)

PIN Code (Postal Index Number Code) of this village is 334802.

== Transportation ==
Thawariya is near the Sikar-Nokha Highway, also known as SH-20. Road transportation is adequate, but there is no railway. Inhabitants travel to Nokha or Bikaner for the train.
