= Basi Udawatan =

Village in Rajasthan, India

- Village
- Location within Rajasthan Location within India
- Coordinates: 27.7576°N 73.7191°E
- Country: India
- State: Rajasthan
- District: Bikaner
- Sub-District: Jasrasar

Government
  - Type: Panchayati Raj
  - Body: Gram Panchayat

Area
  - Total: 7.27 km^{2} (2.81 sq mi)

Population (2011)
  - Total: 248

Language
  - Official Language: Hindi
- Time zone: UTC+5:30 (IST)
- PIN: 334802
- Vehicle registration: RJ-50, RJ-07

Basi Udawatan is a small village located in Jasrasar Tehsil of Bikaner District, Rajasthan, India.

People residing in this village rely on agriculture, consists both irrigated and non-irrigated farming.

== Demographics ==
According to the 2011 Census, conducted by the Government of India, the population of this village was 248, out of which 137 were males and 111 were females. The literacy rate was 28.50%.

Inhabitants of this village follows Hinduism.

Religion in Basi Udawatan village (2011)
Religion	Percent
Hinduism	100%
Distribution of religions in Basi Udawatan Village

Bagri is the most spoken language here. Hindi, and English are officially used languages.

Languages of Basi Udawatan village(2011)
1. Bagri (99.0%)
2. Hindi (1.00%)

Pin Code (Postal Index Number Code) of this village is 334802.

== Transportation ==
Transport facilities in this village are good. This village is located 10 km away from SH-20, and SH-20(B).

== See also ==
- Sadhasar
- Jasrasar
