= Sajanwasi =

Village in Rajasthan, India

- Village
- Location in Rajasthan, India Sajanwasi (India)
- Coordinates: 27.7320°N 73.7318°E
- Country: India
- State: Rajasthan
- District: Bikaner
- Sub-District: Jasrasar
- Assembly Constituency: Dungargarh

Government
  - Type: Panchayati Raj
  - Body: Gram Panchayat

Area
  - Total: 8.12 km^{2} (3.14 sq mi)

Population (2011)
  - Total: 2,304

Language
  - Official Language: Hindi
- Time zone: UTC+5:30 (IST)
- PIN: 334802
- Vehicle registration: RJ-50, RJ-07

Sajanwasi is a village in Jasrasar Tehsil within the Bikaner district of the Indian state of Rajasthan. Villagers primarily rely on agriculture, and many of them own their own enterprises.

== Demographics ==
As per the 2011 Census, the population numbered 2,304, including 1,216 males and 1,088 females. The Literacy rate of this village is 60.75%.

100% of the village follows Hinduism.

Religion in Sajanwasi Village (2011)
Religion	Percent
Hinduism	99.8%
Distribution of religions in Sajanwasi Village

Bagri, a dialect of Rajsthani is the most spoken language here. The village administration follows Hindi as their official language.

Languages of Sajanwasi village(2011)
1. Bagri (96.0%)
2. Hindi (3.90%)
3. English (0.10%)

== Transport ==
Sajanwasi is located near the Bikaner-Napasar-Ladnun Highway, SH-20(B). The roads are in good condition. No railway services reaches the village. Inhabitants travel to Nokha or Bikaner for railway transportation.
