= Utmamdesar =

Village in Rajasthan, India

- Village
- Location in Rajasthan, India Utmamdesar (India)
- Coordinates: 27.8225°N 73.7511°E
- Country: India
- State: Rajasthan
- District: Bikaner
- Sub-District: Jasrasar
- Assembly Constituency: Dungargarh

Government
  - Type: Panchayati Raj
  - Body: Gram Panchayat

Area
  - Total: 23.85 km^{2} (9.21 sq mi)

Population (2011)
  - Total: 2,031

Language
  - Official Language: Hindi
- Time zone: UTC+5:30 (IST)
- PIN: 334802
- Vehicle registration: RJ-50, RJ-07

Utmamdesar is a village located in Bikaner District, Rajasthan, India.

The primary source of income for the residents of this village is agriculture, both irrigated and non-irrigated. A few of them also run their own companies.

== Demographics ==
According to 2011 - Census, conducted by Government of India; total population of this village is 2031, out of which male population is 1053 and female population is 978. Literacy rate of this village is 54.20%.

Population of this village follows Hinduism.

Religion in Utmamdesar Village (2011)
Religion	Percent
Hinduism	100%
Distribution of religions in Utmamdesar Village

Bagri, a dialect of Rajasthani is the most spoken language in this village. Hindi is the official language.

Languages of Utmamdesar village(2011)
1. Bagri (98.0%)
2. Hindi (1.90%)
3. English (0.10%)

== Transportation ==
This village is located on the Bikaner-Napasar-Ladnun Highway also known as SH-20(B). This village is well connected to Road Transportation, but as of now, there's no railway transportation facility available in this village. Inhabitants have to travel to either Nokha or Bikaner for railway transportation.
