= Siniyala =

Village in Rajasthan, India

- Village
- Location in Rajasthan, India Siniyala (India)
- Coordinates: 27.7330°N 73.6705°E
- Country: India
- State: Rajasthan
- District: Bikaner
- Sub-District: Jasrasar

Government
  - Type: Panchayati Raj
  - Body: Gram Panchayat

Area
  - Total: 27.68 km^{2} (10.69 sq mi)

Population (2011)
  - Total: 3,092

Language
  - Official Language: Hindi
- Time zone: UTC+5:30 (IST)
- PIN: 334802
- Vehicle registration: RJ-50, RJ-07

Siniyala is a village in Jasrasar Tehsil within the Bikaner district of the Indian state of Rajasthan.

Villagers primarily rely on agriculture, with many owning their own enterprises.

== Demographics ==
As per the 2011 Census, the population numbered 3,092, including 1,595 males and 1,497 females. The Literacy rate was 48.03%.

100% of the village follows Hinduism.

Religion in Siniyala Village (2011)
Religion	Percent
Hinduism	99.8%
Distribution of religions in Siniyala Village

Bagri, a dialect of Rajsthani, is the most spoken language, although the village administration uses Hindi.

Languages of Siniyala village(2011)
1. Bagri (96.0%)
2. Hindi (3.90%)
3. English (0.10%)

== Transport ==
Siniyala is near the Sikar-Nokha Highway, SH-20. The roads are in good condition. No railway services reaches the village. Inhabitants travel to Nokha or Bikaner for the train.
