= Dudawas =

Village in Bikaner (Rajasthan), India

- Village
- Location within Rajasthan Location within India
- Coordinates: 27.6107°N 73.8628°E
- Country: India
- State: Rajasthan
- District: Bikaner
- Sub-District: Jasrasar

Government
  - Type: Panchayati Raj
  - Body: Gram Panchayat

Area
  - Total: 8.13 km^{2} (3.14 sq mi)

Population (2011)
  - Total: 1,424

Language
  - Official Language: Hindi
- Time zone: UTC+5:30 (IST)
- PIN: 334802
- Vehicle registration: RJ-50, RJ-07

Dudawas is a small village in Jasrasar Tehsil of Bikaner District, Rajasthan, India.

People residing in this village rely on agriculture, consisting of irrigated and non-irrigated farming.

== Demographics ==
According to the 2011 Censuss conducted by the Government of India, the population of this village was 1,424, out of which 744 were males and 680 were females. The literacy rate was 59.72%.

Inhabitants of this village follows Hinduism.

Religion in Dudawas village (2011)
Religion	Percent
Hinduism	100%
Distribution of religions in Dudawas Village

Bagri is the most spoken language here. Hindi, and English are officially used languages.

Languages of Dudawas village(2011)
1. Bagri (97.5%)
2. Hindi (1.00%)
3. English (1.50%)

The Pin Code (Postal Index Number Code) is 334802.

== Transportation ==
Transport facilities in this village are good. This village is located near SH-20, and SH-20(B).

== See also ==
- Gajsukhdesar
- Jasrasar
