= Adsar Purohitan =

Village in Rajasthan, India

- Village
- Location in Rajasthan, India Adsar Purohitan (India)
- Coordinates: 28.2493°N 74.1876°E
- Country: India
- State: Rajasthan
- District: Bikaner
- Sub-District: Shri Dungargarh
- Assembly Constituency: Dungargarh

Government
  - Type: Panchayati Raj
  - Body: Gram Panchayat

Area
  - Total: 29.69 km^{2} (11.46 sq mi)

Population (2011)
  - Total: 4,328

Language
  - Official Language: Hindi
- Time zone: UTC+5:30 (IST)
- PIN: 331801
- Vehicle registration: RJ-07

Adsar Purohitan is a village located in Shri Dungargarh Tehsil within the Bikaner district of Rajasthan, India. This village's population primarily rely on agriculture, and many of them own their own enterprises.

== Demographics ==
As per 2011 Census, conducted by Government of India; population of this village is 4,328, out of which 2,240 is male population and 2,088 is female population. There're total 634 houses in this village. Literacy rate of this village is 49.93%.

99.8% of the village population follows Hinduism, while there're a few followers of Islam also reside in this village.

Religion in Adsar Purohitan Village (2011)
Religion	Percent
Hinduism	99.8%
Islam	0.20%
Distribution of religions in Adsar Purohitan Village

Bagri, a dialect of Rajsthani is the most spoken language here. The village administration follows Hindi as their official language.

Languages of Adsar Purohitan village(2011)
1. Bagri (96.0%)
2. Hindi (3.90%)
3. English (0.10%)

The PIN Code (Postal Index Number Code) of this village is 331801.
