= Lalamdesar Bara =

Village in Rajasthan, India

- Village
- Location in Rajasthan, India Lalamdesar Bara (India)
- Coordinates: 27.8300°N 73.7887°E
- Country: India
- State: Rajasthan
- District: Bikaner
- Sub-District: Jasrasar
- Assembly Constituency: Dungargarh

Government
  - Type: Panchayati Raj
  - Body: Gram Panchayat

Area
  - Total: 31.18 km^{2} (12.04 sq mi)

Population (2011)
  - Total: 4,153

Language
  - Official Language: Hindi
- Time zone: UTC+5:30 (IST)
- PIN: 334802
- Vehicle registration: RJ-50, RJ-07

Lalamdesar Bara is a village located in the Bikaner District, Rajasthan, India.

The people who live in this village are primarily dependent on agriculture; they engage in both irrigated and non-irrigated farming, and some also run their own enterprises there.

== Demographics ==
As per Census - 2011, conducted by Government of India; population of this village is 4153, out of which male population is 2209 and female population is 1944. Literacy rate of this village is 50.59%

Population of this village follows Hinduism.

Religion in Lalamdesar Bara Village (2011)
Religion	Percent
Hinduism	100%
Distribution of religions in Lalamdesar Bara Village

Bagri is the most spoken language in this village, Hindi is the official language.

1. Bagri (95.0%)
2. Hindi (4.50%)
3. English (0.50%)

PIN Code(Postal Index Number Code) of this village is 334802.

== Transportation ==
This village is well connected to Road Transportation. This village is connected to Bikaner-Napasar-Ladnun also known as SH-20(B) via road.

Railway transportation facility is not available in this village as of now.
