= Baniya, Rajasthan =

Village in Rajasthan, India

Baniya
- Village
- Location within Rajasthan Location within India
- Coordinates: 27.8004°N 73.6042°E
- Country: India
- State: Rajasthan
- District: Bikaner
- Sub-District: Jasrasar

Government
  - Type: Panchayati Raj
  - Body: Gram Panchayat

Area
  - Total: 14.46 km^{2} (5.58 sq mi)

Population (2011)
  - Total: 2,395

Language
  - Official Language: Hindi
- Time zone: UTC+5:30 (IST)
- PIN: 334202
- Vehicle registration: RJ-50, RJ-07

Baniya is a village located in Jasrasar Tehsil of Bikaner District, Rajasthan, India.

People residing in this village mainly rely on agriculture, consists both irrigated and non-irrigated farming.

== Demographics ==
As per 2011-Census, conducted by Government of India; total population of this village is 2395, out of which, 1235 are males and, 1160 are females. Total literacy rate of this village is 50.10%.

Inhabitants of this village follows Hinduism.

Religion in Baniya Village (2011)
Religion	Percent
Hinduism	100%
Distribution of religions in Baniya Village

Bagri is the most spoken language in this village. Hindi, and English are officially used languages.

Languages of Baniya village(2011)
1. Bagri (98.0%)
2. Hindi (1.90%)
3. English (0.10%)

== Transport ==
Road transport facilities is at good condition in this village.

For railway transport facilities, inhabitants need to travel to either Nokha or Bikaner.
