= Bagseu =

Village in Rajasthan, India

- Village
- Location within Rajasthan Location within India
- Coordinates: 27.5940°N 73.8058°E
- Country: India
- State: Rajasthan
- District: Bikaner
- Sub-District: Jasrasar

Government
  - Type: Panchayati Raj
  - Body: Gram Panchayat

Area
  - Total: 18.28 km^{2} (7.06 sq mi)

Population (2011)
  - Total: 2,056

Language
  - Official Language: Hindi
- Time zone: UTC+5:30 (IST)
- PIN: 334802
- Vehicle registration: RJ-50, RJ-07

Bagseu is a village located in Jasrasar Tehsil of Bikaner District, Rajasthan, India.

People residing in this village rely on agriculture, consists both irrigated and non-irrigated farming.

== Demographics ==
According to the 2011 Census, conducted by the Government of India, the population of this village was 2,056, out of which 1,110 were males and 946 were females. The literacy rate was 54.35%.

Inhabitants of this village follows Hinduism.

Religion in Bagseu village (2011)
Religion	Percent
Hinduism	100%
Distribution of religions in Bagseu Village

Bagri is the most spoken language here. Hindi, and English are officially used languages.

Languages of Bagseu village(2011)
1. Bagri (97.0%)
2. Hindi (2.50%)
3. English (0.50%)

Pin Code (Postal Index Number Code) of this village is 334802.

== Transportation ==
Transport facilities in this village are good. At present, railway transportation facilities are not available. Inhabitants need to travel to other cities.

== See also ==
- Dudawas
- Gajsukhdesar
- Jasrasar
