= Mainsar =

Village in Rajasthan, India

- Village
- Location within Rajasthan Location within India
- Coordinates: 27.5367°N 73.8152°E
- Country: India
- State: Rajasthan
- District: Bikaner
- Sub-District: Jasrasar

Government
  - Type: Panchayati Raj
  - Body: Gram Panchayat

Area
  - Total: 46.35 km^{2} (17.90 sq mi)

Population (2011)
  - Total: 6,264

Language
  - Official Language: Hindi
- Time zone: UTC+5:30 (IST)
- PIN: 334802
- Vehicle registration: RJ-50, RJ-07

Mainsar is a village in Jasrasar Tehsil of Bikaner District, Rajasthan, India.

People residing in this village rely on agriculture, consisting of irrigated and non-irrigated farming.

== Demographics ==
According to the 2011 Census conducted by the Government of India, the population of this village was 6,264, of which 3,347 were males and 2,917 were females. The literacy rate was 39.69%.

Inhabitants of this village follows Hinduism.

Religion in Mainsar village (2011)
| Religion | Percent |
| Hinduism | 100% |
Distribution of religions in Mainsar Village

Bagri is the most spoken language here. Hindi, and English are officially used languages.

Languages of Mainsar village(2011)
1. Bagri (97.5%)
2. Hindi (1.00%)
3. English (1.50%)

Pin Code (Postal Index Number Code) of this village is 334802.
