= Badhnoo =

Village in Rajasthan, India

- Village
- Location in Rajasthan, India Badhnoo (India)
- Coordinates: 27.5529°N 73.4635°E
- Country: India
- State: Rajasthan
- District: Bikaner
- Sub-District: Jasrasar
- Assembly Constituency: Dungargarh

Government
  - Type: Panchayati Raj
  - Body: Gram Panchayat

Area
  - Total: 67.02 km^{2} (25.88 sq mi)

Population (2011)
  - Total: 6,846

Language
  - Official Language: Hindi
- Time zone: UTC+5:30 (IST)
- PIN: 334202
- Vehicle registration: RJ-50, RJ-07

Badhnoo is a village located in Jasrasar Tehsil within the Bikaner district of Rajasthan, India. Population of this village majorly rely on Agriculture, and also involves in other premises.

== Demographics ==
As per 2011 Census, conducted by Government of India; population of this village is 6846, out of which 3618 is male population and 3228 is female population. There're total 888 houses in this village. Literacy rate of this village is 52.72%.

Village population follows Hinduism

Religion in Badhnoo Village (2011)
Religion	Percent
Hinduism	100%
Distribution of religions in Badhnoo Village

Bagri, a dialect of Rajsthani is the most spoken language here. The village administration follows Hindi as their official language.

Languages of Badhnoo village(2011)
1. Bagri (97.0%)
2. Hindi (2.50%)
3. English (0.50%)

PIN Code (Postal Index Number Code) of this village is 334202.
