= Bhagwanpura, Rajasthan =

Village in Rajasthan, India

Bhagwanpura
- Village
- Location within Rajasthan Location within India
- Coordinates: 27.6004°N 73.8694°E
- Country: India
- State: Rajasthan
- District: Bikaner
- Sub-District: Jasrasar

Government
  - Type: Panchayati Raj
  - Body: Gram Panchayat

Area
  - Total: 9.25 km^{2} (3.57 sq mi)

Population (2011)
  - Total: 754

Language
  - Official Language: Hindi
- Time zone: UTC+5:30 (IST)
- PIN: 334802
- Vehicle registration: RJ-50, RJ-07

Bhagwanpura is a village in Jasrasar Tehsil of Bikaner District, Rajasthan, India.

People residing in this village rely on agriculture, consisting of irrigated and non-irrigated farming.

== Demographics ==
According to the 2011 Census conducted by the Government of India, the population of this village was 754, out of which 401 were males and 353 were females. The literacy rate was 60.16%.

Inhabitants of this village follows Hinduism.

Religion in Bhagwanpura village (2011)
| Religion | Percent |
| Hinduism | 100% |
Distribution of religions in Bhagwanpura Village

Bagri is the most spoken language here. Hindi, and English are officially used languages.

Languages of Bhagwanpura village(2011)
1. Bagri (97.0%)
2. Hindi (2.00%)
3. English (1.00%)

== See also ==
- Jasrasar
