= Meusar =

Village in Rajasthan, India

- Village
- Location within Rajasthan Location within India
- Coordinates: 27.7937°N 73.7119°E
- Country: India
- State: Rajasthan
- District: Bikaner
- Sub-District: Jasrasar

Government
  - Type: Panchayati Raj
  - Body: Gram Panchayat

Area
  - Total: 16.95 km^{2} (6.54 sq mi)

Population (2011)
  - Total: 1,313

Language
  - Official Language: Hindi
- Time zone: UTC+5:30 (IST)
- PIN: 334802
- Vehicle registration: RJ-50, RJ-07

Meusar is a village in Jasrasar Tehsil of Bikaner District, Rajasthan, India.

People residing in this village rely on agriculture, consisting of irrigated and non-irrigated farming.

== Demographics ==
According to the 2011 Census conducted by the Government of India, the population of this village was 1,313, of which 717 were males and 596 were females. The literacy rate was 50.70%.

Inhabitants of this village follows Hinduism.

Religion in Meusar village (2011)
| Religion | Percent |
| Hinduism | 100% |
Distribution of religions in Meusar Village

Bagri is the most spoken language here. Hindi, and English are officially used languages.

Languages of Meusar village(2011)
1. Bagri (97.5%)
2. Hindi (1.00%)
3. English (1.50%)
