= Moondar =

Village in Rajasthan, India

- Village
- Location within Rajasthan Location within India
- Coordinates: 27.5606°N 73.8559°E
- Country: India
- State: Rajasthan
- District: Bikaner
- Sub-District: Jasrasar

Government
  - Type: Panchayati Raj
  - Body: Gram Panchayat

Area
  - Total: 10.92 km^{2} (4.22 sq mi)

Population (2011)
  - Total: 1,436

Language
  - Official Language: Hindi
- Time zone: UTC+5:30 (IST)
- PIN: 334802
- Vehicle registration: RJ-50, RJ-07

Moondar is a village in Jasrasar Tehsil of Bikaner District, Rajasthan, India.

People residing in this village rely on agriculture, consisting of irrigated and non-irrigated farming.

== Demographics ==
According to the 2011 Census conducted by the Government of India, the population of this village was 1,436, of which 752 were males and 684 were females. The literacy rate was 61.19%.

Inhabitants of this village follows Hinduism.

Religion in Moondar village (2011)
Religion	Percent
Hinduism	100%
Distribution of religions in Moondar Village

Bagri is the most spoken language here. Hindi, and English are officially used languages.

Languages of Moondar village(2011)
1. Bagri (97.5%)
2. Hindi (1.00%)
3. English (1.50%)
