= Jaisingh Desar Kaliyan =

Village in Rajasthan, India

- Village
- Location within Rajasthan Location within India
- Coordinates: 27.8295°N 73.6096°E
- Country: India
- State: Rajasthan
- District: Bikaner
- Sub-District: Jasrasar

Government
  - Type: Panchayati Raj
  - Body: Gram Panchayat

Area
  - Total: 12.06 km^{2} (4.66 sq mi)

Population (2011)
  - Total: 664

Language
  - Official Language: Hindi
- Time zone: UTC+5:30 (IST)
- PIN: 334802
- Vehicle registration: RJ-50, RJ-07

Jaisingh Desar Kaliyan is a small village located in Jasrasar Tehsil of Bikaner District, Rajasthan, India.

The village is agricultural.

== Demographics ==
According to the 2011 Census conducted by the Government of India, the population of this village was 664, out of which 339 were males and 325 were females. The literacy rate was 51.09%.

Inhabitants of the village follow Hinduism.

Religion in Jaisingh Desar Kaliyan village (2011)
Religion	Percent
Hinduism	100%
Distribution of religions in Jaisingh Desar Kaliyan Village

Bagri is the most spoken language there. Hindi, and English are used officially.

Languages of Jaisingh Desar Kaliyan village(2011)
1. Bagri (97.5%)
2. Hindi (1.00%)
3. English (1.50%)
