= Jhareli =

Village in Rajasthan, India

- Village
- Location within Rajasthan Location within India
- Coordinates: 27.6616°N 73.7551°E
- Country: India
- State: Rajasthan
- District: Bikaner
- Sub-District: Jasrasar

Government
  - Type: Panchayati Raj
  - Body: Gram Panchayat

Area
  - Total: 39.85 km^{2} (15.39 sq mi)

Population (2011)
  - Total: 4,962

Language
  - Official Language: Hindi
- Time zone: UTC+5:30 (IST)
- PIN: 334802
- Vehicle registration: RJ-50, RJ-07

Jhareli is a village in Jasrasar Tehsil of Bikaner District, Rajasthan, India.

People residing in this village rely on agriculture, consisting of irrigated and non-irrigated farming.

== Demographics ==
According to the 2011 Census conducted by the Government of India, the population of this village was 4,962, out of which 2,627 were males and 2,335 were females. The literacy rate was 50.67%.

Inhabitants of this village follows Hinduism.

Religion in Jhareli village (2011)
Religion	Percent
Hinduism	100%
Distribution of religions in Jhareli Village

Bagri is the most spoken language here. Hindi, and English are officially used languages.

Languages of Jhareli village(2011)
1. Bagri (97.0%)
2. Hindi (2.50%)
3. English (0.50%)

Pin Code (Postal Index Number Code) of this village is 334802.
