= Kurjadi =

Village in Rajasthan, India

- Village
- Location within Rajasthan Location within India
- Coordinates: 27.7258°N 73.7174°E
- Country: India
- State: Rajasthan
- District: Bikaner
- Sub-District: Jasrasar

Government
  - Type: Panchayati Raj
  - Body: Gram Panchayat

Area
  - Total: 17.28 km^{2} (6.67 sq mi)

Population (2011)
  - Total: 352

Language
  - Official Language: Hindi
- Time zone: UTC+5:30 (IST)
- PIN: 334802
- Vehicle registration: RJ-50, RJ-07

Kurjadi is a village in Jasrasar Tehsil of Bikaner District, Rajasthan, India.

People residing in this village rely on agriculture, consisting of irrigated and non-irrigated farming.

== Demographics ==
According to the 2011 Census conducted by the Government of India, the population of this village was 352, of which 191 were males and 161 were females. The literacy rate was 60.69%.

Inhabitants of this village follows Hinduism.

Religion in Kurjadi village (2011)
Religion	Percent
Hinduism	100%
Distribution of religions in Kurjadi Village

Bagri is the most spoken language here. Hindi, and English are officially used languages.

Languages of Kurjadi village(2011)
1. Bagri (97.0%)
2. Hindi (2.50%)
3. English (0.50%)
