= Bagar (region) =

Region in north-western India

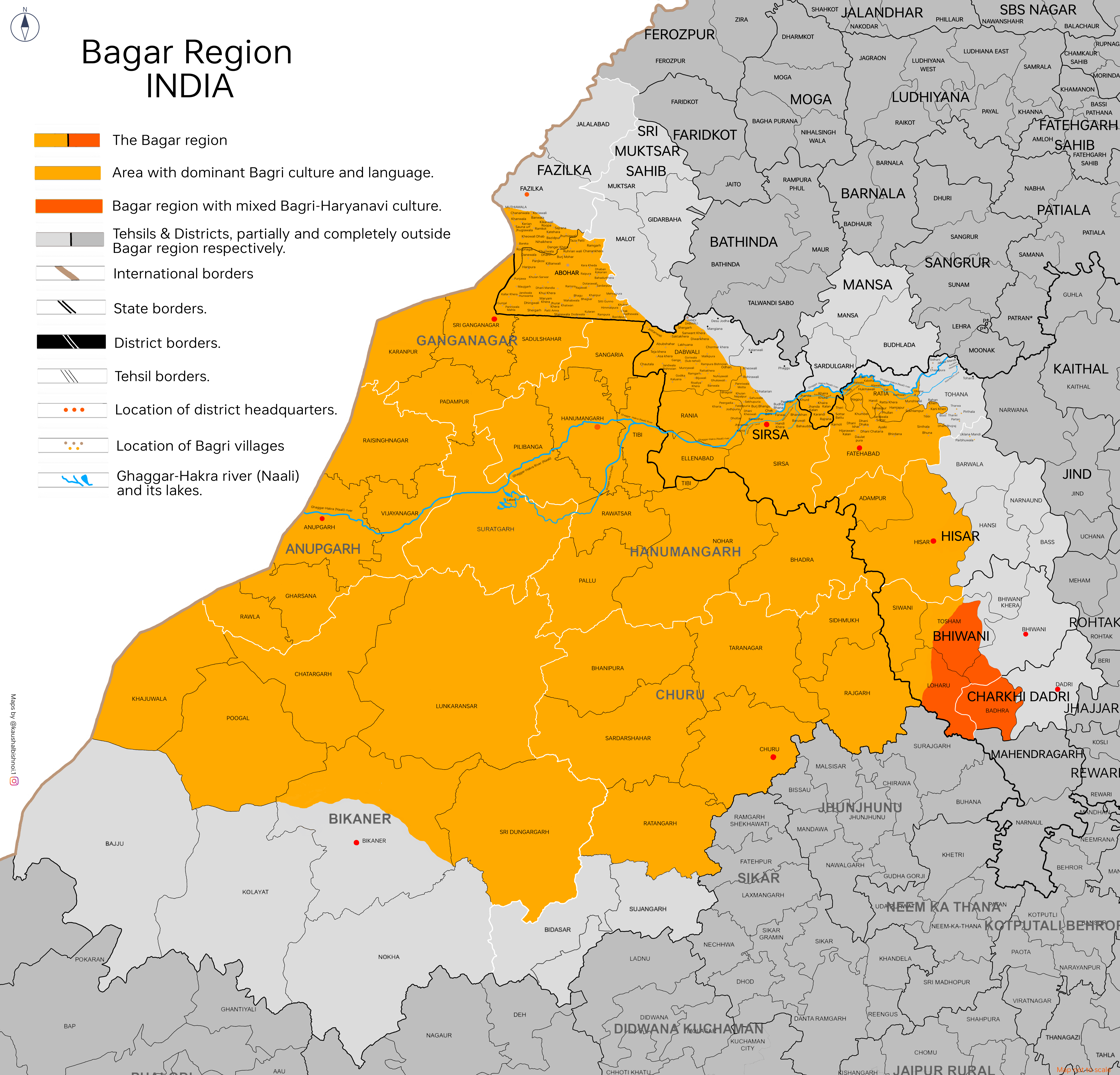
Historical region Bagar
Location	Northwestern India 29°58′N 74°32′E
Language	Bagri
Dynasties	Yaudheya: Established 5th century BCE; Disestablished 3rd-4th century CE; Bhati: Established 255 AD; Disestablished 1527 AD at Bhatner; Rathore: Established – 1488(15th century) in Lower Bagar region; Established – 1527 AD in Bhatner; Disestablished –1949(20th century)
Historical capitals	Bikaner, Shaikhsar, Hanumangarh

Bagar, also Bagad, a term meaning the "dry country", is a reference to a region in north-western India in north Rajasthan, West Haryana, south-west Punjab, India where the Bagri language is spoken and which is inhabited by the Bagri people. The region is characterised by sandy tracks and shifting sand dunes which are now irrigated by canals.

== Etymology ==
Bagar means the prairie (grazing shrubs and grassland) of northern Rajputana, which likely comes from eponymous Arabic word "baqar" or "bagar" (بقرة) meaning "cow" (sacred to Hindus), derived from the Arabic word "cattle". Baggara in Arabic means "cattle herders". Bagar tract refers to the semi-arid semi-fertile rain-fed sandy shrubby grassland tract at the confluence of arid Thar Desert and fertile bangar and khadir areas of Indo-Gangetic Plain, which as historically inhabited by the cattle herders who remained semi-nomadic until they began to adapt to settled life in the mid to late Medieval Period. Before the adoption of the Arabic name bagar, the area was earlier known as Jangladesh during the Vedic era of Mahabharata and even in early medieval times at least until the end of Hindu reign of Prithviraj Chauhan.

== Bagar tracts ==
Bagar (Hindi: बागड़) region is characterised by Bagar tracts which are long strips of shifting sand dunes called tibba (टिब्बा) and relatively semi-fertile lands and the area between them is called lal (लाळ) in northern districts of Rajasthan and along the northwestern districts of Haryana.

== Geography ==
The Bagar region has potentially very fertile alluvial soil interspersed with highly permeable very sandy tracts in several places with water table more than 100 feet below ground containing brackish water usually unfit for human consumption, where dust storms frequent during the warm summer months from April till the end of July when monsoon arrives.

Previously, the drinking water availability in the Bagar tract was solely based on the rain & wells and irrigation was possible only in the small areas of Ghaggar basin of Bagar region in districts of Fatehabad, Sirsa, Hanumangarh, Sri Ganganagar and Anupgarh where the seasonal Ghaggar River flows.

Earlier Western Yamuna Canal and after 1963 Bhakra Nangal Dam canal system provides the water for irrigation in most of Haryana including all of the Bagar region falling in Haryana on its western border.

The Ganga Canal in 1927 and in 1984 Indira Gandhi Canal irrigation also known as Rajasthan Canal brought the water of Sutlej and Beas rivers to the fields of Rajasthan including its Bagar tract, stabilizing the sand dunes and soil erosion by preventing the expansion of desert.

Geographically, the Bagar region lies between the:

- Malwa, Punjab to the north,
- The Shekhawati region and the Marwar region of Rajasthan to the south.
- The Aravali Range to the southeast in the Charkhi Dadri district and Tosham tehsil of Bhiwani district,
- Ahirwal region of Haryana also in the southeast.
- The eastern border in bounded to the Haryanavi speaking region of haryana.
- In the west of Bagar region lies the Rohi(रोई)/Cholistan Desert in Pakistan's Punjab province, with a few Bagri speakers in Pakistan's Bahawalpur and Bahawalnagar districts.

Geographical extent of Bagar region.
States	Districts
Rajasthan	Anupgarh district, Sri Ganganagar district, Hanumangarh district, Khajuwala, Chhatargarh, Loonkaransar, Pugal, Sri Dungargarh and Bikaner tehsils of Bikaner district, Taranagar, Sardarshahar, Rajgarh, Sidhmukh, Bhanipura, Ratangarh and Churu tehsils in Churu district.
Punjab	Abohar & Fazilka tehsils of Fazilka district, Southern villages of Sri Muktsar Sahib district.
Haryana	Sirsa district, Fatehabad district, Barwala, Adampur and Hisar tehsils of Hisar district.; Siwani, Loharu and Tosham tehsils of Bhiwani district; Badhra tehsil of Charkhi Dadri district

== Bagri language ==
A Bagri speaker.

Bagri (बागड़ी), a dialect of overlapping Rajasthani language, Haryanvi language and Punjabi language of the Indo-Aryan family, is spoken by about five million speakers residing in Bagar region of Rajasthan, Haryana and Punjab states in India.

== Politics of Bagar Region (Constituencies and MLA) ==
There are 40 Constituencies of Haryana, Punjab and Rajasthan legislative assemblies where the Bagri language is spoken by majority of the population.

- In Punjab, there 4 constituencies of Fazilka and Sri Muktsar Sahib in South Punjab where Bagri speakers decide the fate of elections. Out of 4 constituencies only 1 constituency is reserved for SC candidate.
- In Haryana, there are 15 constituencies in north west haryana which comes under the Bagar region out of which 2 constituencies are reserved for SC candidates.
- In Rajasthan, there are 21 constituencies of Rajasthan Legislative Assembly which comes under the Bagar region in North Rajasthan. Meanwhile, 4 constituencies out of 21 constituencies are reserved for SC candidates.

=== Rajasthan ===
Following is the list of the constituencies and the candidates from Bhartiya Janata Party, Congress party and the Independent candidates appeared in 2023 Rajasthan Legislative Assembly election from the Bagri speaking region of Rajasthan.

District	Constituency		Member of Legislative Assembly		Remarks
District	No.	Name	Name	Party	Remarks
Sri Ganganagar	1	Sadulshahar	Gurveer Singh Brar	BJP	
Sri Ganganagar	2	Ganganagar	Jaydeep Bihani	BJP	
Sri Ganganagar	3	Karanpur	Rupinder Singh Kooner	INC	
Sri Ganganagar	4	Suratgarh	Dungar Ram Gedar	INC	
Sri Ganganagar	5	Raisinghnagar (SC)	Sohan Lal Nayak	INC	
Sri Ganganagar	6	Anupgarh (SC)	Shimla Devi	INC	
Hanumangarh	7	Sangaria	Abhimanyu Poonia	INC	
Hanumangarh	8	Hanumangarh	Ganesh Raj Bansal	IND	
Hanumangarh	9	Pilibanga (SC)	Vinod Gothwal	INC	
Hanumangarh	10	Nohar	Amit Chachan	INC	
Hanumangarh	11	Bhadra	Sanjeev Kumar Beniwal	BJP	
Bikaner	12	Khajuwala (SC)	Vishwanath Meghwal	BJP	
Bikaner	13	Bikaner West	Jethanand Vyas	BJP	
Bikaner	14	Bikaner East	Siddhi Kumari	BJP	
Bikaner	15	Kolayat	Anshuman Singh Bhati	BJP	
Bikaner	16	Lunkaransar	Sumit Godara	BJP	Cabinet Minister
Bikaner	17	Dungargarh	Tarachand Saraswat	BJP	
Bikaner	18	Nokha	Sushila Rameshwar Dudi	INC	
Churu	19	Sadulpur	Manoj Nyangli	SHS	Merged With Shiv Sena From BSP
Churu	20	Taranagar	Narendra Budania	INC	
Churu	21	Sardarshahar	Anil Kumar Sharma	INC	

=== Haryana ===
Following is the list of constituencies and Members of Legislative Assembly from the Bagri speaking region of North Western Haryana.

District	No.	Constituency	Name	Party	Alliance	Remarks	Reservation
Fatehabad	1	Tohana -(39)	Paramvir Singh	Indian National Congress	INDIA		
Fatehabad	2	Fatehabad – (40)	Dura Ram	Bharatiya Janata Party	NDA		
Fatehabad	3	Ratia – (41)	Jarnail Singh	Indian National Congress	INDIA		SC
Sirsa	4	Kalanwali – (42)	Shishpal Singh	Indian National Congress	INDIA		SC
Sirsa	5	Dabwali – (43)	Aditya Devilal	Indian National Lok Dal	None		
Sirsa	6	Rania – (44)	Arjun Chautala	INLD	None		
Sirsa	7	Sirsa – (45)	Gokul Setia	Indian National Congress	INDIA		
Sirsa	8	Ellenabad – (46)	Bharat Singh Beniwal	Indian National Congress	INDIA		
Hisar	9	Adampur (46)	Chander Parkash	Indian National Congress	INDIA		
Hisar	10	Uklana (48)	Naresh Selwal	Indian National Congress	INDIA		
Hisar	11	Barwala (51)	Ranbir Singh Gangwa	Bhartiya Janata Party	NDA	Cabinet Minister	
Hisar	12	Hisar – (52)	Savitri Jindal	Independent	NDA		
Bhiwani	13	Loharu (54)	Rajbir Fartia	Indian National Congress	INDIA		
Bhiwani	14	Tosham (58)	Shruti Choudhry	Bhartiya Janata Party	NDA	Cabinet minister	
Charkhi Dadri	15	Badhra (55)	Umed Singh	Bharatiya Janata Party	NDA		

=== Punjab ===
Following is the list of constituencies and MLA in the Punjab Legislative Assembly from Fazilka district and southern part of Sri Muktsar Sahib district with the significant presence of Bagri Speakers in South Punjab, India.

District	No.	Constituency	Name	Party	Bench
Fazilka	1	Fazilka – (80)	Narinderpal Singh Sawna	Aam Aadmi Party	Government
Fazilka	2	Abohar – (81)	Sandeep Jakhar	Independent politician	Opposition
Fazilka	3	Balluana – (82) (SC)	Amandeep Singh ‘Goldy’ Musafir	Aam Aadmi Party	Government
Sri Muktsar Sahib	4	Lambi – (83)	Gurmeet Singh Khudian	Aam Aadmi Party	Government

== Gallery ==
Sirsa district

Fatehabad district

Hisar district

Bhiwani district

Charkhi Dadri district

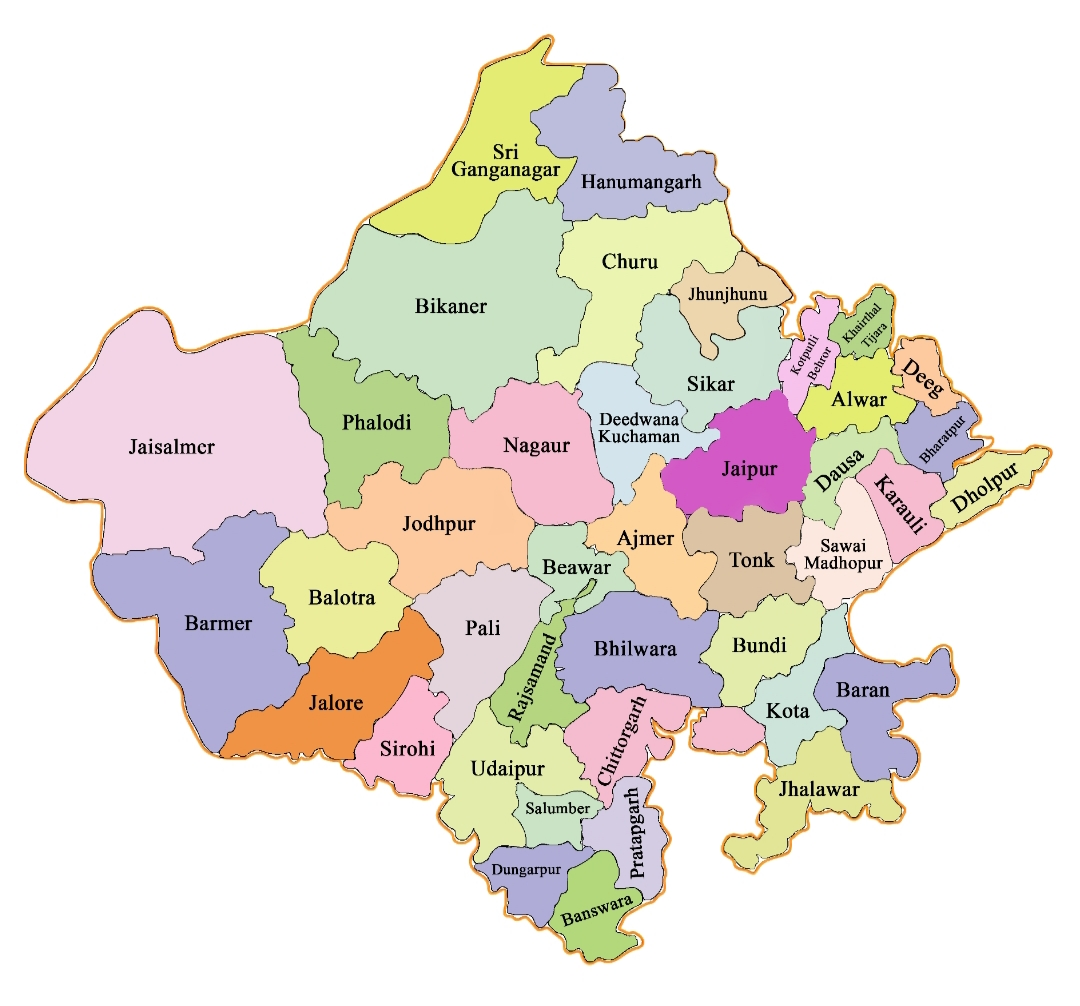
Bagar tract through Ganganagar district, Anupgarh district, Hanumangarh district, Churu district and Bikaner district in Rajasthan

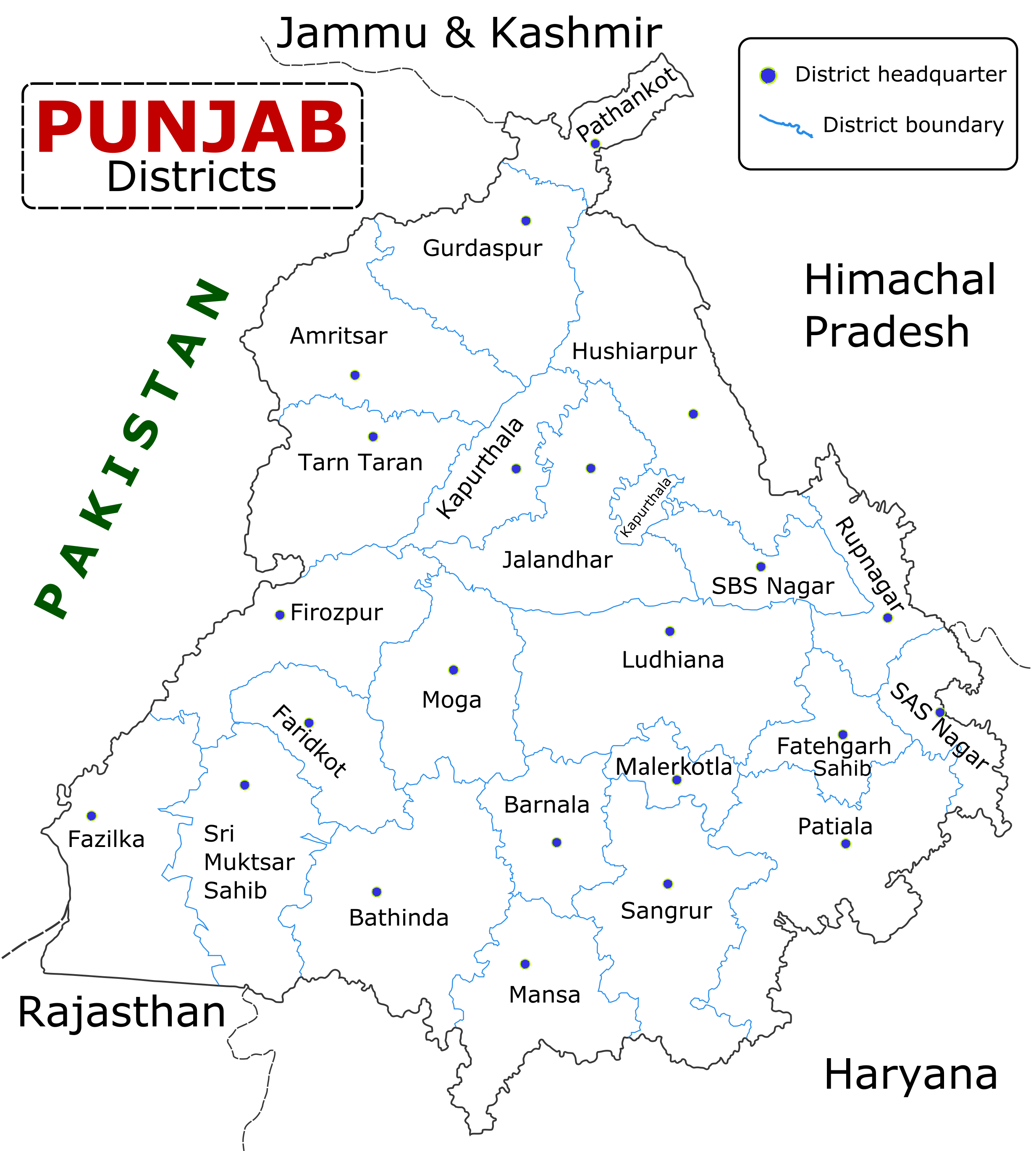
Bagar tract through Fazilka district and southern villages of Muktsar district of Punjab (India)

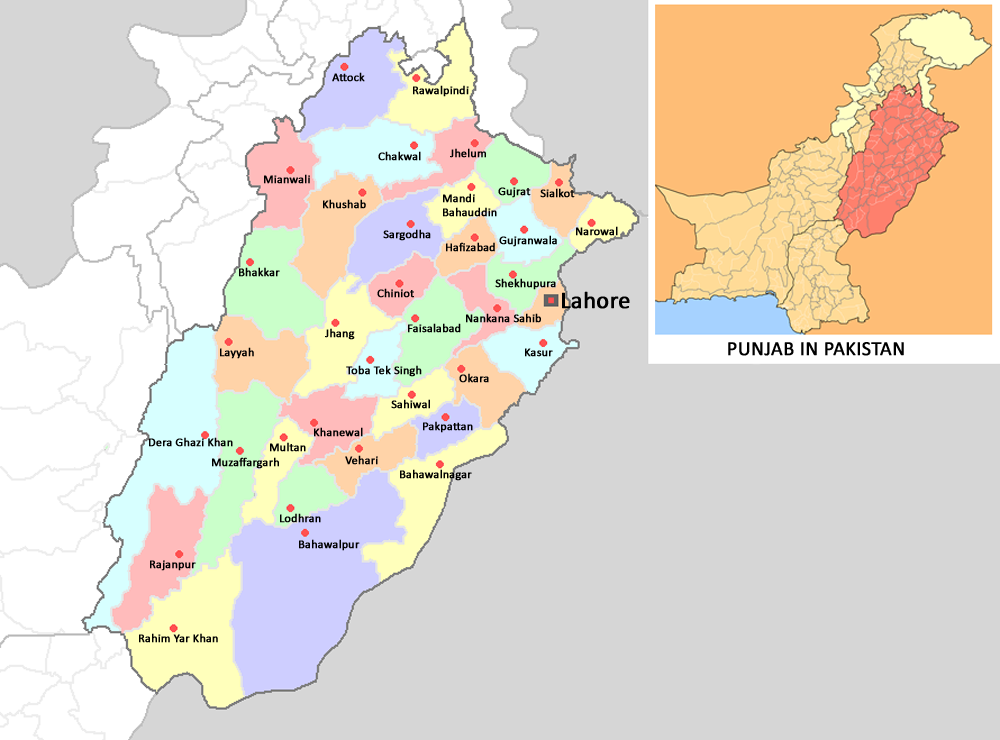
Bagri as minor language is spoken in Bahawalpur and Bahawalnagar district of Punjab, Pakistan, though not considered parts of Bagar tract.

== See also ==
- Barani, Nehri, Nalli
- Bhattiana
- Chak (village)
- Dhani (settlement type)
- Doab
- Jangladesh
- Johad
- Khadir and Bangar
- Punjab region
- Divisions of Haryana
