= Anasar =

Village in Rajasthan, India

- Village
- Location within Rajasthan Location within India
- Coordinates: 27.7124°N 73.7524°E
- Country: India
- State: Rajasthan
- District: Bikaner
- Sub-District: Jasrasar

Government
  - Type: Panchayati Raj
  - Body: Gram Panchayat

Area
  - Total: 6.68 km^{2} (2.58 sq mi)

Population (2011)
  - Total: 320

Language
  - Official Language: Hindi
- Time zone: UTC+5:30 (IST)
- PIN: 334802
- Vehicle registration: RJ-50, RJ-07

Anasar is a small village located in Jasrasar Tehsil of Bikaner District, Rajasthan, India.

People residing in this village mainly depends on agriculture, consists both irrigated and non-irrigated farming.

== Demographics ==
According to the 2011 Census, conducted by the Government of India, the population of this village was 320, out of which 162 were males and 158 were females. Literacy rate of this village is 45.94%.

Inhabitants of this village follows Hinduism.

Religion in Anasar village (2011)
Religion	Percent
Hinduism	100%
Distribution of religions in Anasar Village

Bagri is the most spoken language here. Hindi, and English are officially used languages.

Languages of Anasar village(2011)
1. Bagri (98.0%)
2. Hindi (1.00%)
3. English (1.00%)

Pin Code (Postal Index Number Code) of this village is 334802.

== Transport ==
Transport facility in this village is at good condition. This village is located near SH-20, and SH-20(B).
