= Kakra, Rajasthan =

Village in Rajasthan, India

Kakra
- Village
- Location within Rajasthan Location within India
- Coordinates: 27.6704°N 73.6673°E
- Country: India
- State: Rajasthan
- District: Bikaner
- Sub-District: Jasrasar

Government
  - Type: Panchayati Raj
  - Body: Gram Panchayat

Area
  - Total: 43.44 km^{2} (16.77 sq mi)

Population (2011)
  - Total: 7,561

Language
  - Official Language: Hindi
- Time zone: UTC+5:30 (IST)
- PIN: 334802
- Vehicle registration: RJ-50, RJ-07

Kakra is a village in Jasrasar Tehsil of Bikaner District, Rajasthan, India.

People residing in this village rely on agriculture, consisting of irrigated and non-irrigated farming.

== Demographics ==
According to the 2011 Census conducted by the Government of India, the population of this village was 7,561, out of which 3,914 were males and 3,647 were females. The literacy rate was 69.46%.

Inhabitants of this village follows Hinduism.

Religion in Kakra village (2011)
| Religion | Percent |
| Hinduism | 100% |
Distribution of religions in Kakra Village

Bagri is the most spoken language here. Hindi, and English are officially used languages.

Languages of Kakra village(2011)
1. Bagri (97.0%)
2. Hindi (2.50%)
3. English (0.50%)

Pin Code (Postal Index Number Code) of this village is 334802.

== Transport ==
Transport facilities in this village are good. At present, railway transport facilities are not available.
