= Sadhasar =

Village in Rajasthan, India

- Village
- Location in Rajasthan, India Sadhasar (India)
- Coordinates: 27.7954°N 73.7752°E
- Country: India
- State: Rajasthan
- District: Bikaner
- Sub-District: Jasrasar
- Assembly Constituency: Dungargarh

Government
  - Type: Panchayati Raj
  - Body: Gram Panchayat

Area
  - Total: 53.59 km^{2} (20.69 sq mi)

Population (2011)
  - Total: 5,474

Language
  - Official Language: Hindi
- Time zone: UTC+5:30 (IST)
- PIN: 334802
- Vehicle registration: RJ-50, RJ-07

Sadhasar is a village in Jasrasar Tehsil in the Bikaner district of Rajasthan, India. This village's population primarily rely on agriculture.

== Demographics ==
As per 2011 Census, conducted by Government of India; population of this village is 5474, out of which 2856 is male population and 2618 is female population. There're total 719 houses in this village. Literacy rate of this village is 56.17%.

99.8% of the village population follows Hinduism, while there're a few followers of Islam also reside in this village.

Religion in Sadhasar Village (2011)
Religion	Percent
Hinduism	99.8%
Islam	0.20%
Distribution of religions in Sadhasar Village

Bagri, a dialect of Rajsthani is the most spoken language here. The village administration follows Hindi as their official language.

Languages of Sadhasar village(2011)
1. Bagri (96.0%)
2. Hindi (3.90%)
3. English (0.10%)

PIN Code(Postal Index Number Code) of this village is 334802.
