= Jalwali =

Jalwali Jalwali
- Village
- Interactive map of Jalwali
- Coordinates: 28.271756°N 73.177301°E
- Country: India
- State: Rajasthan
- District: Bikaner

Jalwali is a village in Bikaner district in the Indian state of Rajasthan. It is near the Indo-Pakistani border.
