= Sadul Singh Rathore of Bagseu =

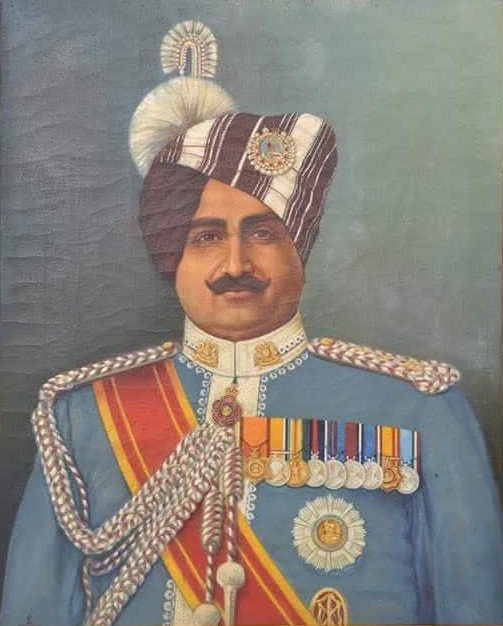
Official portrait of Colonel Rao Bahadur Thakur Sir Sadul Singh Rathore, CIE (1881–1937), Prime Minister of Bikaner State under Maharaja Ganga Singh of Bikaner.

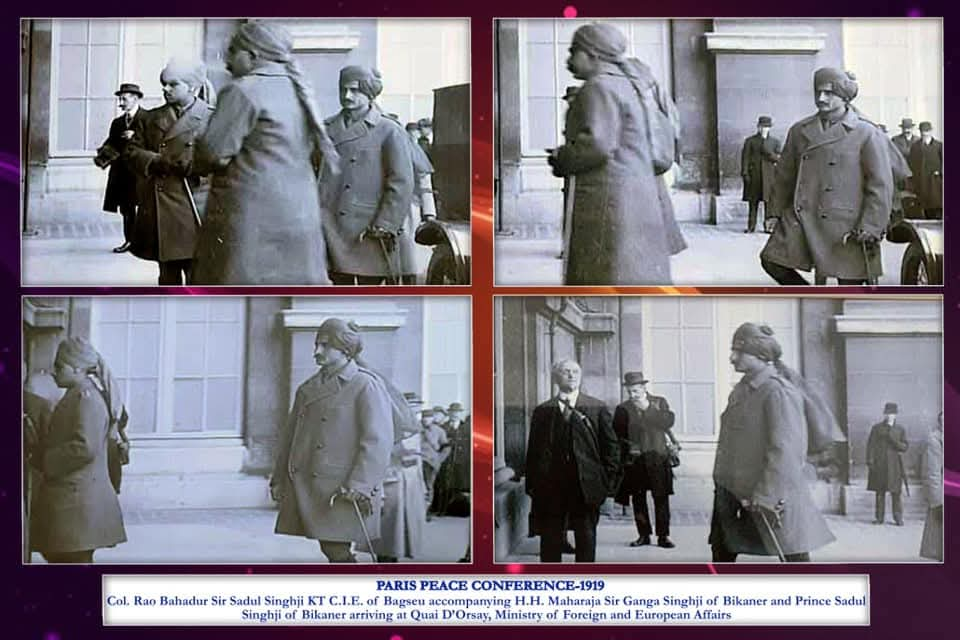
Sir Sadul Singh Rathore accompanying Maharaja Ganga Singh of Bikaner at the Paris Peace Conference, Versailles, 1919.

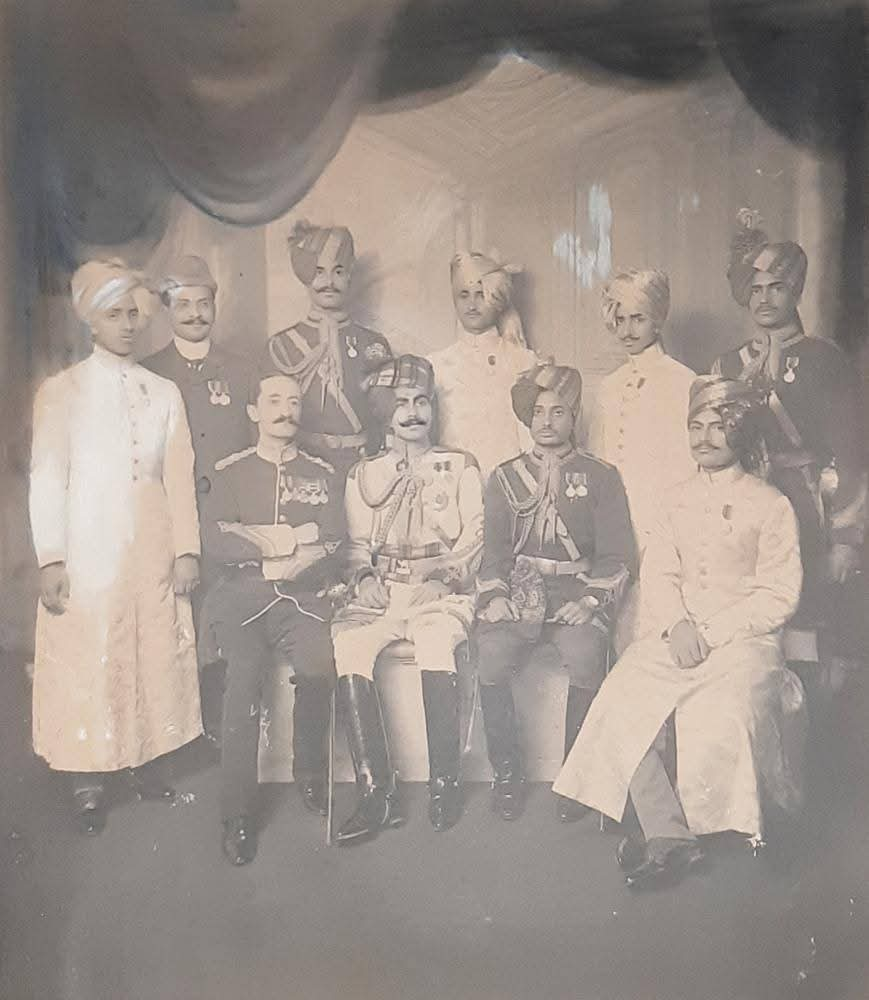
Group portrait featuring Maharaja Ganga Singh of Bikaner (seated, centre), Sardul Singh of Bagseu (standing, fourth from left), and other nobles and officials of Bikaner State,

Colonel Rao Bahadur Thakur Sir Sadul Singh Rathore CIE (1881 – 23 December 1937), of Bagseu, was a senior administrator and Colonel in the Bikaner Army in Bikaner State, and served with the Ganga Risala.

He was the son of Thakur Rawat Singh Rathore of Roda and was descended from the Karamsot branch of the Rathore dynasty. Sadul Singh was appointed Assistant Private Secretary to Maharaja Ganga Singh of Bikaner in 1902, Deputy Revenue and Financial Secretary in 1904, Revenue and Financial Secretary in 1910, Revenue Member of the Bikaner State Executive Council in 1912, and Public Works Minister in 1917. He held the post until his retirement in 1934, when he was also vice-president of the State Executive Council. He was accorded the honour of Do Ladi Tazim, a ceremonial distinction bestowed upon selected nobles of Bikaner State in recognition of their rank, loyalty, and service.

Two years before his death, he was designated as the officiating Prime Minister of the State of Bikaner in addition to his other duties. However, he declined the substantive post for personal reasons. Under Sadul Singh's leadership, the Bagseu estate witnessed significant administrative and economic development, strengthening its position among the leading thikanas of Bikaner State.

He accompanied the Maharaja to the Imperial War Conference and Imperial War Cabinet in London in 1917 and to the Versailles Conference in 1918–1919.

Sadul Singh was granted the title of Rao Bahadur in the 1915 Birthday Honours, and was appointed a Companion of the Order of the Indian Empire (CIE) in the 1920 New Year Honours. He was appointed a Knight Bachelor in 1935, thereby acquiring the style Sir.
