= Lalasar =

Village in Rajasthan, India

- Village
- Location in Rajasthan, India Lalasar (India)
- Coordinates: 27.7803°N 73.6505°E
- Country: India
- State: Rajasthan
- District: Bikaner
- Sub-District: Jasrasar

Government
  - Type: Panchayati Raj
  - Body: Gram Panchayat

Area
  - Total: 34.04 km^{2} (13.14 sq mi)

Population (2011)
  - Total: 1,901

Language
  - Official Language: Hindi
- Time zone: UTC+5:30 (IST)
- PIN: 334802
- Vehicle registration: RJ-50, RJ-07

Lalasar is a village located in Jasrasar Tehsil within the Bikaner district of Rajasthan, India. Inhabitants majorly rely on Agriculture, both irrigated and non-irrigated farming.

== Demographics ==
The total population of this village is 1901, out of which, 1027 are males and 874 are females. Literacy rate of this village is 50.13%.

PIN Code of this village is 334202.

== Transportation ==
In this village, the road transport facility is in good condition, but there're no railway transportation facilities available at the time.
