= Toliyasar =

Village in Rajasthan, India

- village
- Location in Rajasthan, India Toliyasar (India)
- Coordinates: 27°42′0″N 73°58′0″E
- Country: India
- State: Rajasthan

Languages
  - Official: Hindi
- Time zone: UTC+5:30 (IST)

Toliyasar is a Village in Sri Dungargarh Tehsil in Bikaner District of Rajasthan State, India.Toliyasar's local language is Rajasthani. Toliyasar Village Total population is 3194 and number of houses are 523.It's also known for the Toliyasar Bheruji Temple, a significant religious and cultural site in the region.

== Toliyasar Bheruji Temple ==
The Toliyasar Bheruji Temple, dedicated to the Hindu deity Bhairava.It's known for its peaceful atmosphere and is a popular destination for devotees seeking blessings and fulfilling vows.

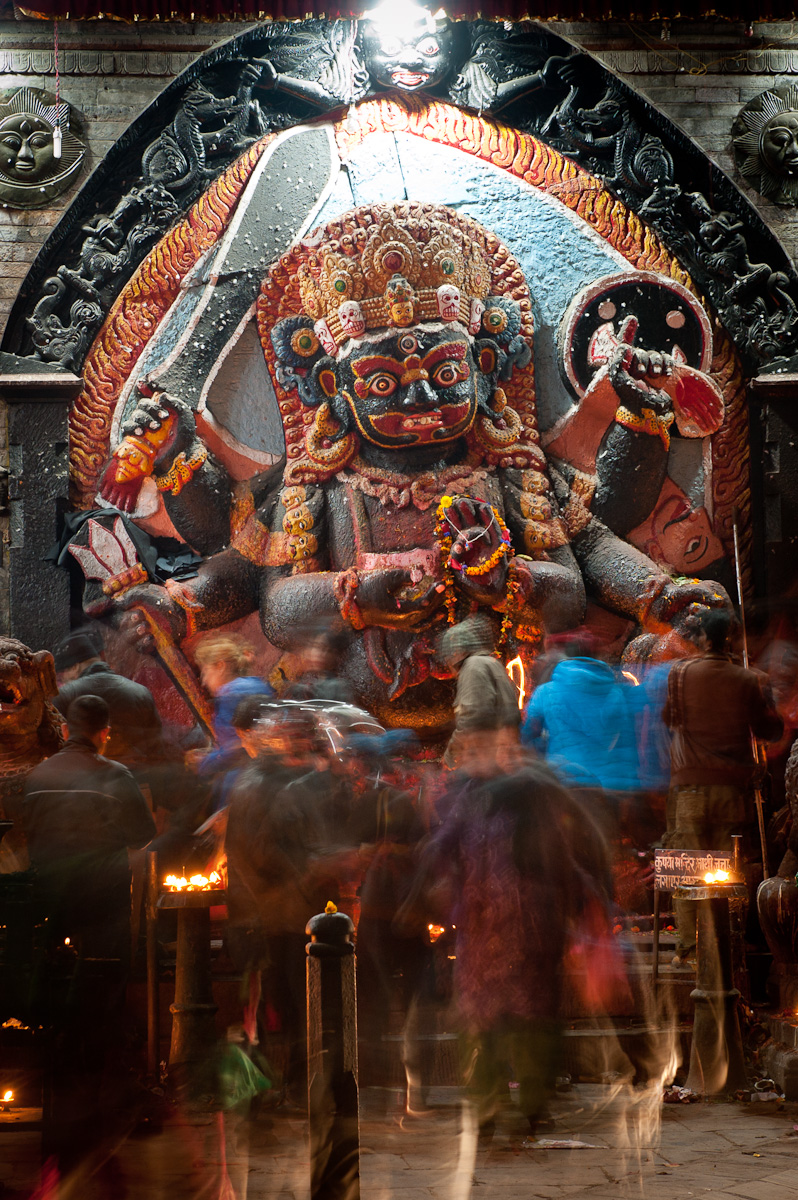
Kala Bhairava

This temple is a prominent feature of the village, attracting both religious pilgrims and visitors interested in its architecture and cultural significance.
