= Jasrasar =

- Tehsil
- Location in Rajasthan, India Jasrasar (India)
- Coordinates: 27.7078°N 73.8140°E
- Country: India
- State: Rajasthan
- District: Bikaner
- Founder: Jasrai Tard (in 1354 AD)

Government
  - Type: Panchayati Raj
  - Body: Gram Panchayat
- Elevation: 217 m (712 ft)

Population (2011)
  - Total: 13,418

Languages
  - Official: Rajasthani; Hindi
  - Additional Official: English
- Time zone: UTC+5:30 (IST)
- PIN: 334802
- Vehicle registration: RJ-07, RJ-50

Jasrasar is a tehsil located in Bikaner district of Rajasthan state, India. It is located 280 kilometres (174 mi) from Jaipur, 225 kilometres (140 mi) from Jodhpur and 483 kilometres (300 mi) from Mount Abu.

== Demographics ==
The population of Jasrasar in 2023 was estimated to be 16,370, According to the last census of 2011, 13,418 people were then living in this village, of whom 7,059 were male and 6,359 female. The population of Jasrasar in 2022 was 15,028 inhabitants. There were 6,187 literate people (4,115 males 2,072 females). People living in Jasrasar depend on multiple skills. The total number of workers was 6,358 (3,594 men and 2,764 women). 2,976 were dependent on agricultural cultivation (1,960 men and 1,016 women). 350 people (286 men and 64 women) worked as lanourers on agricultural land.

98.95% of the villagers follow Hinduism, and the others follow Islam and Jainism. There are Hindu temples, a mosque and a almost 150 years old Jain temple also in which Main Pratima is of Very Rare 1008 Phandhari Suparswanath Tirthankar and the work of renovation is currently going on in the village under the surveillance of Shree Digambar Jain Samaj, Jasrasar. This is the origin village of two sub caste in Jainism which is Pandya and Barjatya But now here only one family of Pandya's are left which belongs to Shri Ghewar Chand Ji Pandya

Religion in Jasrasar Village (2011)
Religion	Percent
Hinduism	98.95%
Islam	1%
Jainism	0.05%
Distribution of religions in Jasrasar Village

Bagri, a dialect of Rajsthani is the most spoken language here. The village administration follows Hindi as their official language.

Languages of Jasrasar village(2011)
1. Bagri (96.0%)
2. Hindi (3.80%)
3. English (0.10%)
4. Urdu (0.10%)

== Transportation ==
Jasrasar is well-connected to Road Transport. Village located on the Nokha-Sujangarh Highway. Village is directly connected to Sujangarh, Nokha via SH-20 and Bikaner via SH-20(B).

== Villages ==
These villages come under the territory of Jasrasar Tehsil (formerly part of Nokha Tehsil).

- Anasar
- Badhnoo
- Bagseu
- Baniya
- Basi Udawatan
- Bilaniyasar
- Beedasariya
- Bhagwanpura
- Bhom Beedasariya
- Dudawas
- Gajsukhdesar
- Jasrasar
- Jaisingh Desar Kaliyan
- Jhareli
- Kakra
- Kuchor Aguni
- Kuchor Athuni
- Kurjadi
- Lalasar
- Lalamdesar Bara
- Lalamdesar Chhota
- Mahramsar
- Mainsar
- Mansoori
- Meusar
- Moondar
- Sadhasar
- Sajanwasi
- Siniyala
- Shri Jasnath Nagar
- Shri Hanumanpura
- Thawariya
- Udsar
- Utmamdesar

== Jasrasar Green energy plant ==
A green energy plant is established in 2022 here with capacity of 14.9 Megawatts which estimated 175 crore investment. It uses agriculture waste to burn and make electricity. So it is a biomass power plant.It is generating employment for 100-200 villagers.
