= Bajju =

- Town
- Location in Rajasthan, India
- Coordinates: 27.93°N 72.51°E
- Country: India
- State: Rajasthan
- District: Bikaner
- Tehsil: Bajju

Languages
  - Official: Hindi, Marwari
- Time zone: UTC+5:30 (IST)
- PIN: 334305
- Area code: 01533
- ISO 3166 code: RJ-IN
- Vehicle registration: RJ 07
- Lok Sabha constituency: Bikaner
- Vidhan Sabha constituency: Kolayat

Bajju is a tehsil and a Panchayat Samiti in Bikaner district in the state of Rajasthan, India.

Bajju was originally called Bajju Khalsa. Before independence, it was part of Jaisalmer.

== Geography ==
Bajju is situated in Bikaner district of Rajasthan in India. The geographical coordinates i.e. latitude and longitude of Bajju is 27.93 and 72.51 respectively.

== See also ==
- Kolayat
- Bikaner
