= Chhatargarh tehsil =

Tehsil in Bikaner district, Rajasthan, India

Chhatargarh is a tehsil in the Bikaner district of Rajasthan, India. Most of the area is covered by agricultural land and is irrigated by IGNL canal.

It is a subdivision and situated approximately 87 km away from district headquarter Bikaner. It comes under Khajuwala assembly and Bikaner parliamentary constituency.

The postal Code is 334021.

A vast majority of the population speaks Bagri language which is a dialect of Rajasthani, with a significant minority proportion of population speaks Hindi and Marwari languages.

== Religion ==
Hinduism and Islam are practised by the majority of people with Sikhism being third most followed religion. A small number of Budhhist and Christians population is also present in the tehsil. The table below shows the religious demographics of the tehsil according to the Census 2011.

Religion-wise Population - Chhatargarh Tehsil
Religions	Total population	Percentage
Hindu	59,672	72.34%
Sikh	1,311	1.59%
Muslim	21,323	25.85%
Christian	76	0.09%
Buddhist	42	0.05%
Jain	17	0.02%
Other Religion	0	0%
No Religion Specified	47	0.06%
Total	82488	100%

== Literacy rate ==
Contents	Total	Male	Female
Children (Age 0-6)	14,790	7,694	7,096
Literacy	52.37%	51.94%	33.09%
Scheduled Caste	23,651	12,487	11,164
Scheduled Tribe	228	122	106
Illiterate	47,033	20,803	26,230

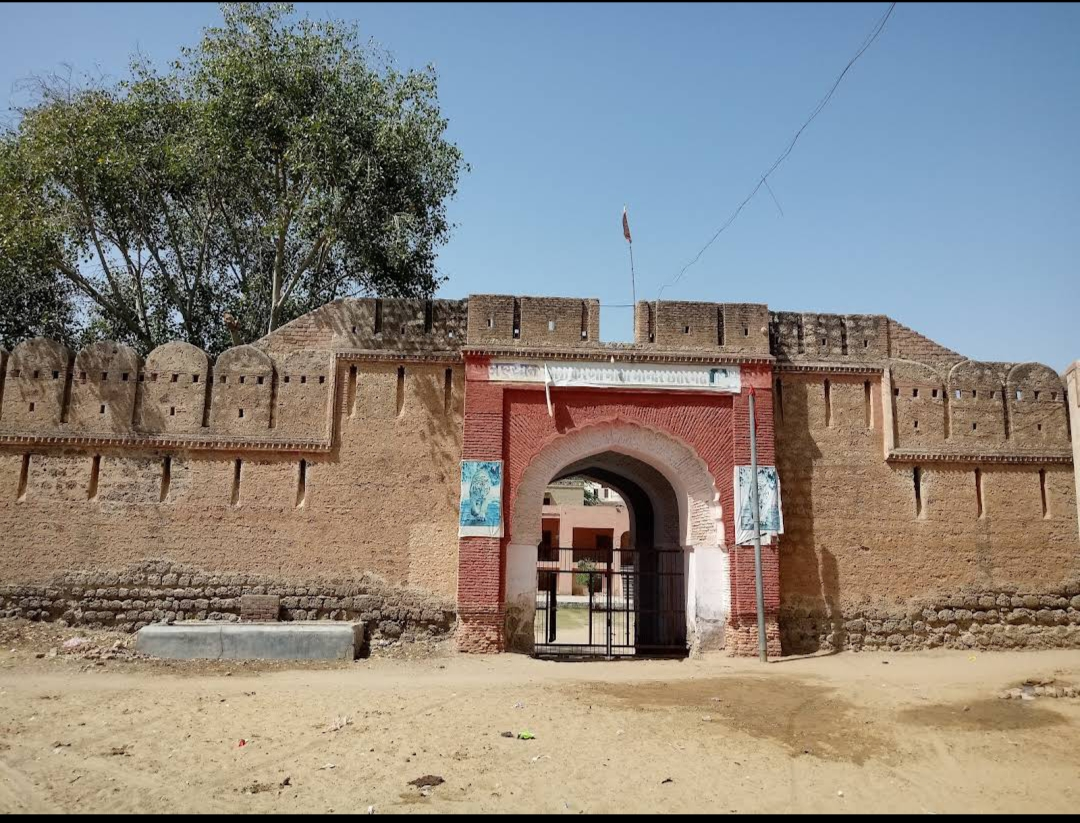
Front view of Mediaeval Chhatargarh fort

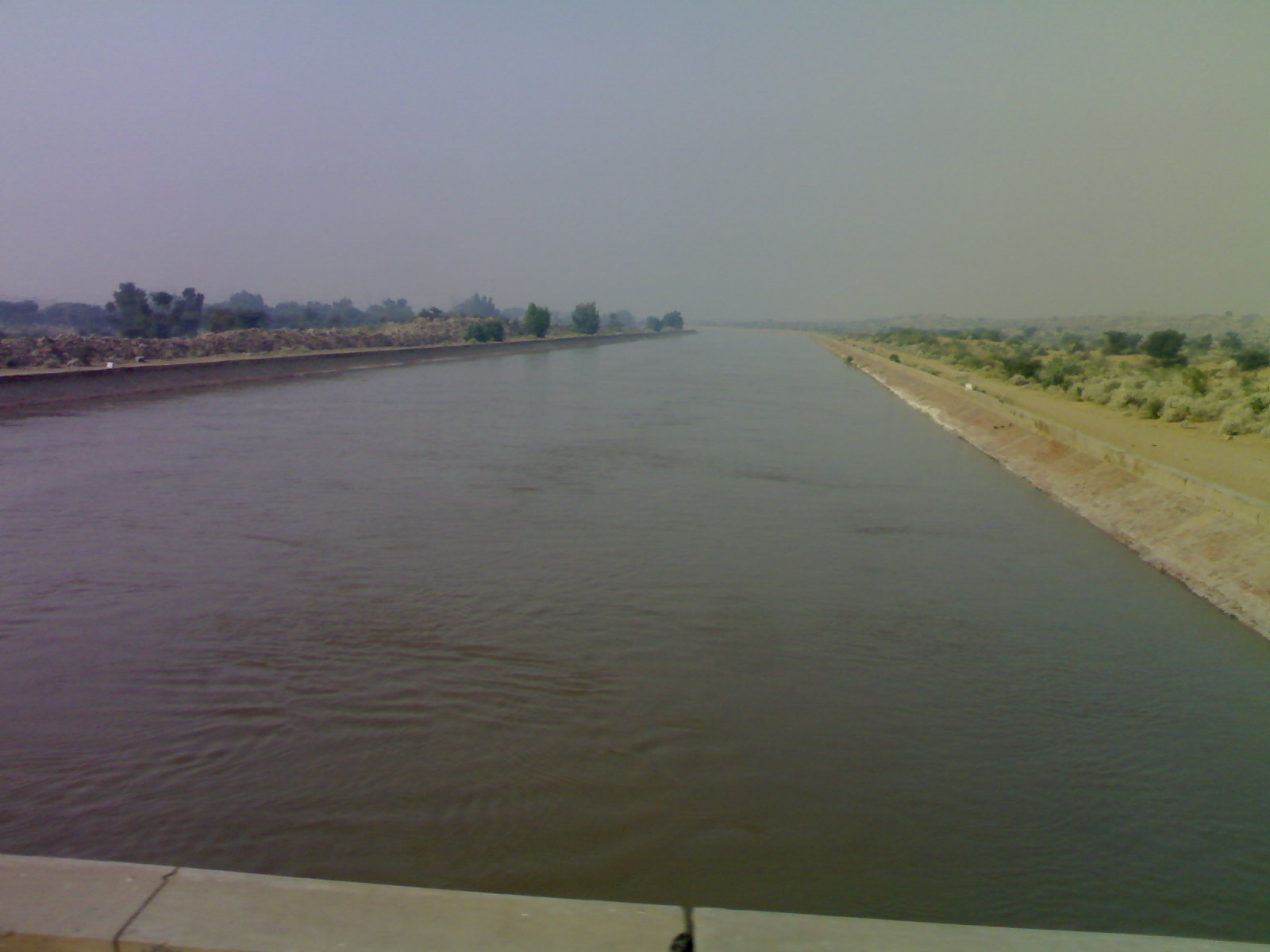
Rajasthan canal(IGNP) near Chhatargarh tehsil
