= Napasar =

- Town
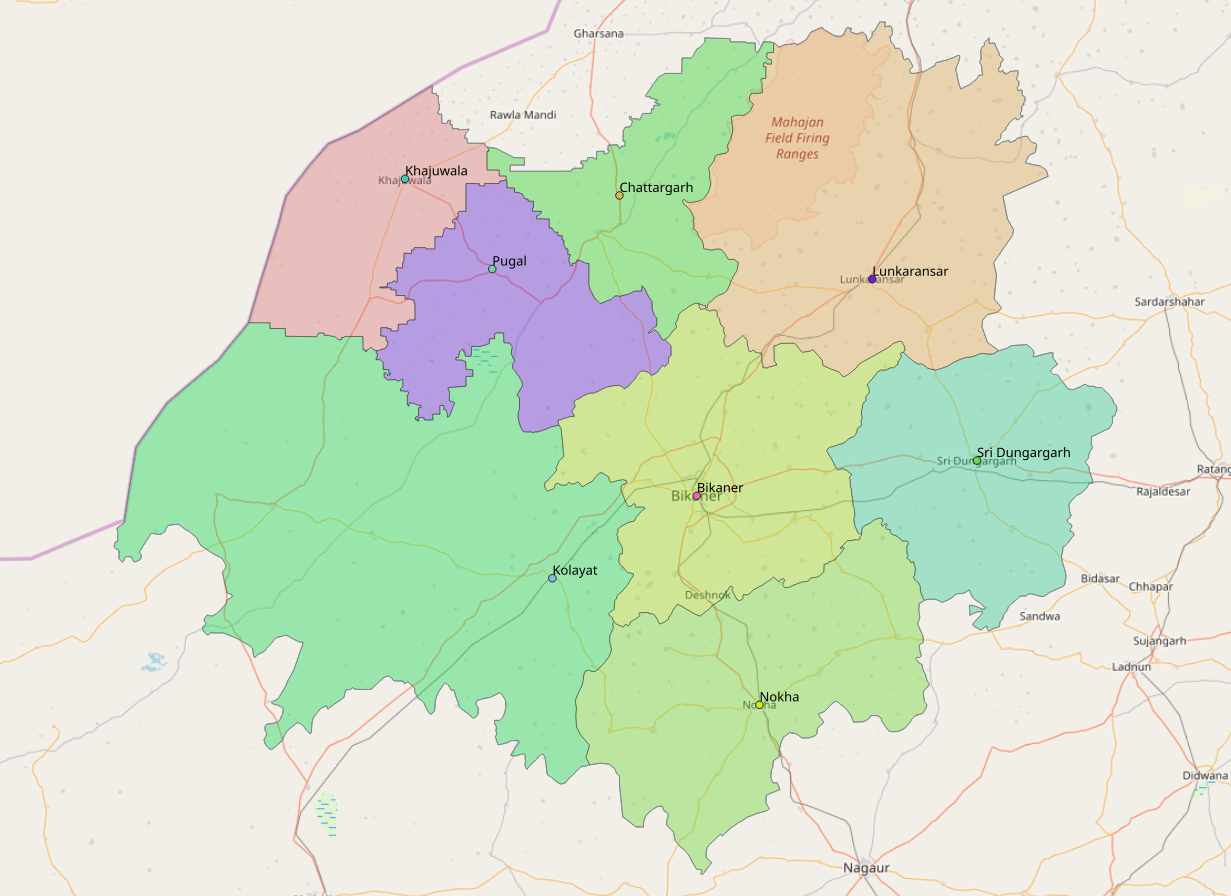
- Location within Bikaner District Location within Rajasthan
- Coordinates: 27°57′56″N 73°33′35″E
- Country: India
- State: Rajasthan
- District: Bikaner
- Founder: Napaji

Government
  - Body: Nagar Palika

Languages
  - Official: Hindi
- Time zone: UTC+5:30 (IST)
- PIN: 334201
- Telephone code: 91–151
- Vehicle registration: RJ-07
- Nearest city: Bikaner
- Sex ratio: 955/1000 ♂/♀
- Literacy: 85%
- Lok Sabha constituency: Bikaner
- Vidhan Sabha constituency: Lunkaransar
- Civic agency: Nagar Palika
- Climate: Hot, cold and normal (Köppen)

Napasar is a town located in the Bikaner district in the Indian state of Rajasthan. It is also known as one of the holiest places of Bikaner.
