= Gajsukhdesar =

Village in Rajasthan, India

- Village
- Location within Rajasthan Location within India
- Coordinates: 27.6363°N 73.8200°E
- Country: India
- State: Rajasthan
- District: Bikaner
- Sub-District: Jasrasar

Government
  - Type: Panchayati Raj
  - Body: Gram Panchayat

Area
  - Total: 28.29 km^{2} (10.92 sq mi)

Population (2011)
  - Total: 3,486
- Time zone: UTC+5:30 (IST)
- PIN: 334802
- Vehicle registration: RJ-50, RJ-07

Gajsukhdesar is a village located in Jasrasar Tehsil of Bikaner District, Rajasthan, India.

People residing in this village rely on agriculture, consists both irrigated and non-irrigated farming.

== Demographics ==
According to the 2011 Census, conducted by the Government of India, the population of this village was 3,486, out of which 1,802 were males and 1,684 were females. Literacy rate of this village is 58.47%.

Inhabitants of this village follows Hinduism.

Pin Code (Postal Index Number Code) of this village is 334802.

== Transportation ==
Transport facilities in this village are good. This village is located near SH-20, and SH-20(B).
