= Rajasthani Muslims =

Ethnic group

Rajasthani Muslim
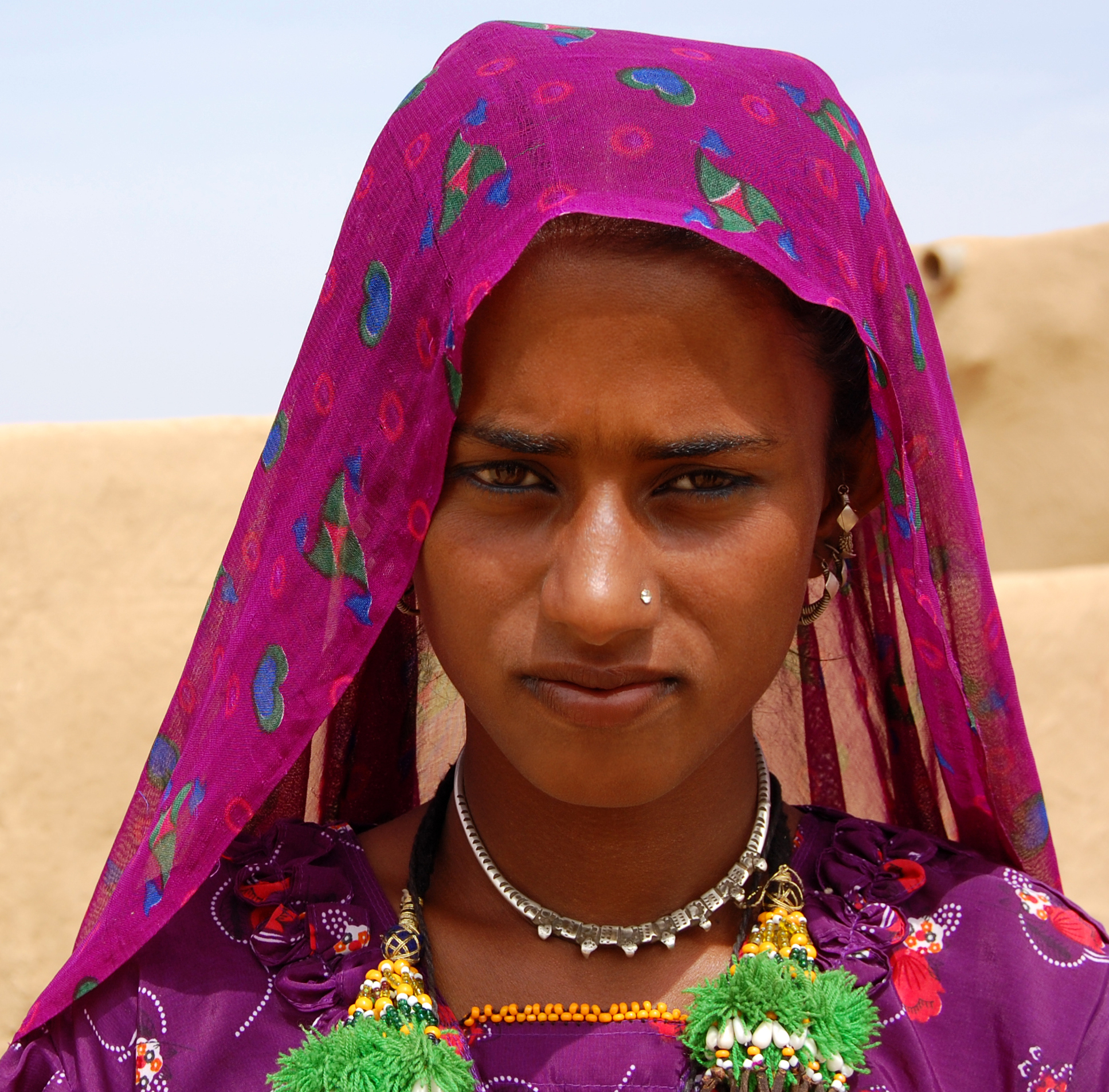
- Young Muslim woman in the Thar desert

Total population
- c. 6.2 million

Regions with significant populations
- India: Unknown
- Pakistan: Unknown
- United Kingdom: Unknown
- Canada: Unknown
- United States: Unknown

Religions
- Islam

Languages
- Rajasthani languages • Hindi • Urdu • Sindhi

Related ethnic groups
- Marwari Muslims • Rajasthani people • Sindhi people • Muhajirs

The term Rajasthani Muslims is usually used to signify Muslims from the state of Rajasthan in the north-western part of India and speaking the Hindi and Sindhi languages.

== Spread of Islam ==
One of the first Sufi Muslim missionaries, Khawaja Moinuddin Chishti, came to Rajasthan in 1222 CE and settled in Ajmer. Khawaja Moinuddin Chishti is also popularly known by his title "Ghareeb Nawaz" (friend of the poor). Khawaja Moinuddin Chishti is one of the most influential Sufi in India and is credited with spreading Islam in the subcontinent.

Khawaja Moinuddin Chishti is buried at the Dargah of Khawaaza Moiunddin Chisti which is his mausoleum (Roza Shareef) in Rajasthani city of Ajmer. The city where he preached Islam his whole life.

== Role of Muslims in society ==
Rajasthani Muslims are very prominent in industry and medium-sized businesses. Many members of this community migrated to Pakistan in 1947 and have settled in Sindh.

== Demography ==
According to the Indian census of 2011, there were 6,215,377 Muslims in Rajasthan, constituting 9.1% of the state's population.

== Masjids ==
There are numerous masjids or mosques in Rajasthan:

- Adhai Din Ka Jhonpra mosque, Ajmer
- Raza Masjid, Basni, Nagaur
- Osmania Masjid, Bhilwara
- Sandali Masjid, Ajmer
- Kagzi Jama Masjid, Kagzi Colony, Jaipur
- Jama Masjid, Johari Bazaar, Jaipur
- Noor Masjid, Sodala, Jaipur
- Haizam Faroshan Masjid, Ashok Nagar, Jaipur
- Library Masjid, Jaipur
- Masjid-E-Gousia Nooriya (Badi Masjid, Savina, Udaipur)
- hussain masjid dholibawdi udaipur
- Shahi Jama Masjid, Tonk City.
- Jami Mosque (Ranthambhore Fort)
- Jami Mosque (Khandar Fort)
- Jami Mosque (Tonk)
- Jami Mosque (Malarna Doonger, Khohri, Behted)

== Dargah/Roza ==
Rajasthan has numerous walis (Sufi saints). The burial place of these saints are known as dargah or roza where Muslim masses pay visit and perform ziyarat by offering namaaz, reciting and reading Quran Shareef and offering fatiha, though all of it is considered baseless by the orthodox authorities, mainly Salafists.

Dargahs in Rajasthan include

- Dargah khawaja Moinuddin Chishti (Garib Nawaz), Ajmer
- Dargah khwaza Fakhruddin Chishti, Sarwar
- Dargah Hisamuddin Chishti, Sambhar lake
- Dargah Fakhruddin shareef, Galiyakot
- Dargah Hazrat Diwan e Shah, Kapasan
- Dargah Mastaan Shah Baba
- Dargah Sheikh Mohammad Durvaish, Motidungri
- Dargah Gaiban Shah Pir, Jalore
- Dargah Abansa Dada sanchore (Jalore)
- Dargah dawalshah pir Surana (Jalore)
- Dargah Dantala Vali sivana, Badmer
- Dargah Amruddin Dada Gudamalani, Badmer
- Dargah MalikshH Pir, Jalore
- Dargah Malik Shah Datar Chitlwana, Jalore
- Dargah Mitu Panju Bhatala, Badmer
- Dargah Asaba Pir Sindhary, Badmer
- Dargah Haji Kadir Baba Saynji Ki Beri, Jalore
- Dargah Hazrat Ismail Macci Sahb, Malarna (SWM)
- Dargah Qattal Shah Pir (Bonli)
- Dargah Haqqani Baba Pir (Chan) SWM

== See also ==
- Islam in India
