= State Highway 20B (Rajasthan) =

Road in Rajasthan, India

Route information
- Length: 143 km (89 mi)

Major junctions
- From: Ladnun, Rajasthan
- To: Bikaner, Rajasthan

Location
- Country: India
- State: Rajasthan
- Districts: Churu, Bikaner
- Primary destinations: Jasrasar, Napasar

Highway system
- Roads in India; Expressways; National; State; Asian; State Highways in Rajasthan
← SH 20A	→ SH 21

State Highway 20B (RJ SH 20B) is a State Highway in Rajasthan state of India that connects Churu district of Rajasthan with Bikaner in Bikaner district of Rajasthan. The total length of RJ SH 20B is 143 km.
