= State Highway 20 (Rajasthan) =

Road in Rajasthan, India

State Highway 20

Route information
- Length: 172.1 km (106.9 mi)

Major junctions
- From: Sikar, Rajasthan
- To: Nokha, Rajasthan

Location
- Country: India
- State: Rajasthan
- Districts: Sikar, Churu, Bikaner
- Primary destinations: Nechwa, Ganeri, Jaswantgarh, Sujangarh, Tal Chhapar, Bidasar, Jasrasar, Mukam

Highway system
- Roads in India; Expressways; National; State; Asian; State Highways in Rajasthan
| → SH 20A |

State Highway 20 (RJ SH 20) is a State Highway in Rajasthan state of India that connects Sikar district of Rajasthan with Nokha in Bikaner district of Rajasthan. The total length of RJ SH 20 is 172.1 km.
