= Nokha railway station =

Railway station in Rajasthan

General information
- Location: National Highway 89, Nokha, Bikaner district India
- Coordinates: 27.5546°N 73.4762°E
- Elevation: 322 metres (1,056 ft)
- System: Indian Railways station
- Owner: Indian Railways
- Operator: North Western Railway zone
- Platforms: 2
- Tracks: 4
- Connections: Auto stand, Car parking

Construction
- Structure type: Standard (on-ground station)
- Parking: Yes(small)
- Cycle facilities: Yes

Other information
- Status: Functioning
- Station code: NOK
- Zone(s): North Western Railway zone
- Division(s): Jodhpur
Location
- Location within Rajasthan Location within India

Nokha railway station is a small railway station in Bikaner district, Rajasthan. Its code is NOK. It serves Nokha town. The station consists of two platforms. Neither is that well sheltered but are quite useful. The station has basic facilities.

It has 3 tracks and 2 platforms, both are not fully sheltered. An over bridge is also there. It has a shop in platform. The ticket counters is open until 7 pm. It has no security. Parking facility is there. One can book a car for nearby location, outside the railway station. Drinking water is also available there.
