= Bagri language =

Indian language

Bagri
- बागड़ी
- The word "Bagri" written in Devanagari script
- Native to: Rajasthan; Haryana; Punjab
- Region: Bagar
- Ethnicity: Rajasthani
- Native speakers: 8,556,652 (2011 census)
- Language family: Indo-European: Indo-Iranian; Indo-Aryan; Western; Rajasthani; Bagri
- Writing system: Devanagari, Gurmukhi

Official status
- Recognised minority language in: Rajasthan, Haryana, Punjab

Language codes
- ISO 639-3: bgq
- Glottolog: bagr1243
- Map Bagar Region

A man speaking Bagri.

Bagri (IPA: [baːɡɽiː]) is an Indo-Aryan language of Rajasthani languages group that takes its name from the Bagar tract region of Northwestern India in the states of Rajasthan, Punjab and Haryana. It is closely related to other Rajasthanic languages and Haryanvi with SOV word order. The most striking phonological feature of Bagri is the presence of three lexical tones: high, mid, and low, akin to Rajasthani, Haryanvi, and Punjabi. Bagri is a language of earlier Bikaner state which included district Sri Ganganagar, Hanumangarh, Churu, Bikaner of Rajasthan and Sirsa (Haryana), Hisar (Haryana), Fazilka (Punjab) at a point in time.

The speakers are mostly in India, with a minority of them in Bahawalpur and Bahawalnagar areas in modern day Pakistan. According to the 2011 census of India, there are 234,227 speakers of Bagri in Rajasthan and 1,656,588 speakers of Bagri in Punjab and Haryana. However, reported speaker numbers for Rajasthani languages, including Bagri, can be misleading due to classification practices in the Indian census.

None of the Rajasthani languages—including major varieties such as Marwari, Mewari, Dhundhari, Hadauti, Malvi, and Bagri—possess official status in India. They are not recognized in the Eighth Schedule of the Indian Constitution, nor do they hold the position of an official language at the state or national level. Hindi serves as the official language of Rajasthan.

In the Census of India, most speakers of Rajasthani varieties are categorized under the broader "Hindi" umbrella as mother tongues. This practice groups numerous distinct Indo-Aryan languages and dialects spoken in Rajasthan (and adjacent regions) with Hindi, resulting in an underrepresentation of the actual number of Rajasthani language users.

== Geographical distribution ==
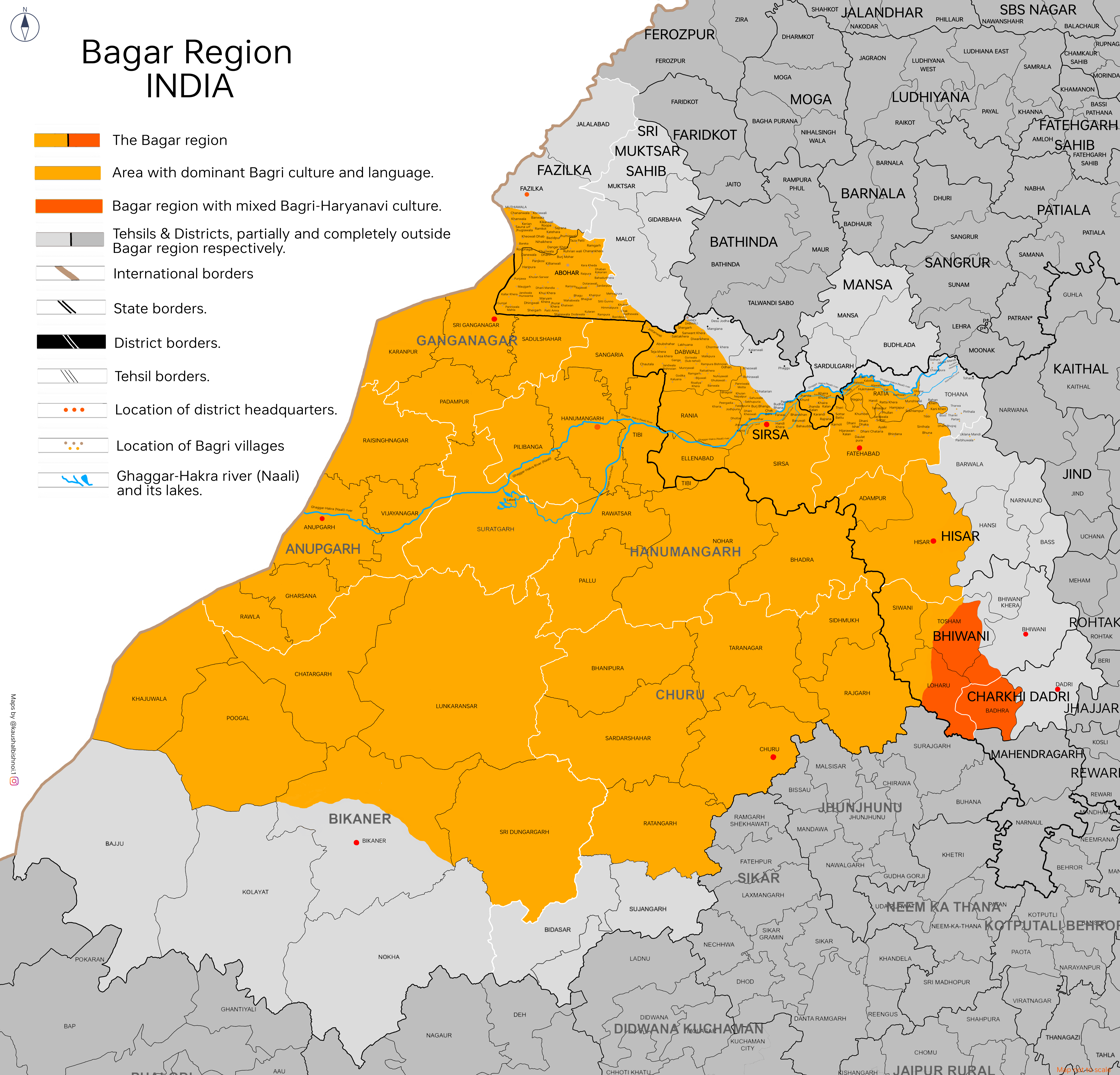

The following table shows the Geographical distribution of Bagri speakers in the states of Rajasthan, Punjab and Haryana.
States	Districts and tehsils
Rajasthan	Anupgarh district, Sri Ganganagar district, Jhunjhunu district, Hanumangarh district, Khajuwala, Chhatargarh, Loonkaransar, Pugal, Sri Dungargarh and Bikaner tehsils of Bikaner district, Taranagar, Sardarshahar, Rajgarh, Sidhmukh, Bhanipura, Ratangarh and Churu tehsils in Churu district.
Punjab	Abohar & Fazilka tehsils of Fazilka district, Southern villages of Muktsar district.
Haryana	Sirsa district ( not including North-eastern punjabi Kalanwali Mandi region), Fatehabad district upto the Ghaggar River, Barwala, Adampur and Hisar tehsils of Hisar district.; Siwani and western part Loharu of Bhiwani district; Badhra tehsil of Charkhi Dadri district

== Features ==
=== Phonology ===
Bagri distinguishes 31 consonants including a retroflex series, 10 vowels, 2 diphthongs, and 3 tones.

Consonants
		Labial	Dental	Retroflex	Palatal	Velar	Glottal
plosive	Voiceless	p	t	ʈ ⟨ṭ⟩	c	k	
plosive	Aspirated	pʰ	tʰ	ʈʰ ⟨ṭh⟩	cʰ	kʰ	
plosive	Voiced	b	d	ɖ ⟨ḍ⟩	ɟ ⟨j⟩	g	
plosive	Breathy	bʰ	dʰ	ɖʰ ⟨ḍh⟩	ɟʰ ⟨jh⟩	gʰ	
fricative			s				h
sonorant	Nasal	m	n	ɳ ⟨ṇ⟩			
sonorant	Approximant		l	ɭ ⟨ḷ⟩	j ⟨y⟩	w	
sonorant	Flap			ɽ ⟨ṛ⟩			
sonorant	Trill		r				

/ɳ/, /ɭ/ and /ɽ/ do not occur word initially.

Vowels
	Front	Central	Back
Close	iː ⟨ī⟩		uː ⟨ū⟩
Near-close	ɪ ⟨i⟩		ʊ ⟨u⟩
Close-mid	eː ⟨e⟩	ə ⟨a⟩	oː ⟨o⟩
Open-mid	ɛː ⟨ai⟩		ɔː ⟨au⟩
Open		aː ⟨ā⟩	

All vowels have their nasalised counterpart, marked with ◌̃ (ँ in Devanagari).

Bagri has 3 tones in a similar way to the Punjabi language. A rising-falling tone ◌́, a rising tone ◌̀, and an unmarked mid tone.

=== Declension ===
- There are two numbers: singular and plural.
- Two genders: masculine and feminine.
- Three cases: simple, oblique, and vocative. Case marking is partly inflectional and partly postpositional.
- Nouns are declined according to their final segments.
- All pronouns are inflected for number and case but gender is distinguished only in the third person singular pronouns.
- The third person pronouns are distinguished on the proximity/remoteness dimension in each gender.
- Adjectives are of two types: either ending in /-o/ or not.
- Cardinal numbers up to ten are infected.
- Both present and past participles function as adjectives.

=== Verbs ===
- There are three tenses and four moods.

=== Syntax ===
- Sentence types are of traditional nature.
- Coordination and subordination are very important in complex sentences.
- Parallel lexicon are existing and are very important from sociolinguistic point of view.

== Samples ==
रोळो है के कोई तेरै
roļo hai ke koī terai
Do you have any problem?

तू कठ्ठै गयैड़ो हो
tū katthe gayairo ho
Where had you been?

घोड़ो होवै जियां
Ghodo hovai jiyan
Like a horse

ब्या म कुण आयो
Byāh ma kun āyo
Who came in the marriage?

टाबरों, के करो हो
tabaron, ke karo ho
What are you doing kids?

दोफारां गी मेरी आसंग कोनी
Dophārān gi meri āsang koni
I'm not well since afternoon.

भांडा
Bhanda
Utensils

बैद
Baid
Doctor

कोजवाड़
kojwād
Embarrassing.

== Official status ==
Bagari is language of Bagar region of Rajasthan extended to some parts of Punjab and Haryana and Pakistan also. Bagri is spoken by Kumawats, Jats, Rajputs, Bagri Kumhars, Suthar, Meghwal, Chamars and others casts residing there. Bagri derives its roots from Marwari when bhati dynasty ruled over the region from Bhatner, modern day Hanumangarh which is epicentre of Bagri language. Bagri culture is also same in this region .

[13]

== Work on Bagri ==
- Grierson, G. A. 1908. (Reprint 1968). Linguistic Survey of India. Volume IX, Part II. New Delhi: Motilal Banarasidass
- Gusain, Lakhan. 1994. Reflexives in Bagri. M.Phil. dissertation. New Delhi: Jawaharlal Nehru University
- Gusain, Lakhan. 1999. A Descriptive Grammar of Bagri. Ph.D. dissertation. New Delhi: Jawaharlal Nehru University
- Gusain, Lakhan. 2000a. Limitations of Literacy in Bagri. Nicholas Ostler & Blair Rudes (eds.). Endangered Languages and Literacy. Proceedings of the Fourth FEL Conference. University of North Carolina, Charlotte, 21–24 September 2000
- Gusain, Lakhan. 2000b. Bagri Grammar. Munich: Lincom Europa (Languages of the World/Materials, 384)
- Gusain, Lakhan. 2008. Bagri Learners' Reference Grammar. Ann Arbor, Michigan: Northside Publishers
- Wilson, J. 1883. Sirsa Settlement Report. Chandigarh: Government Press

== Gallery ==
Regions where Bagri is spoken:

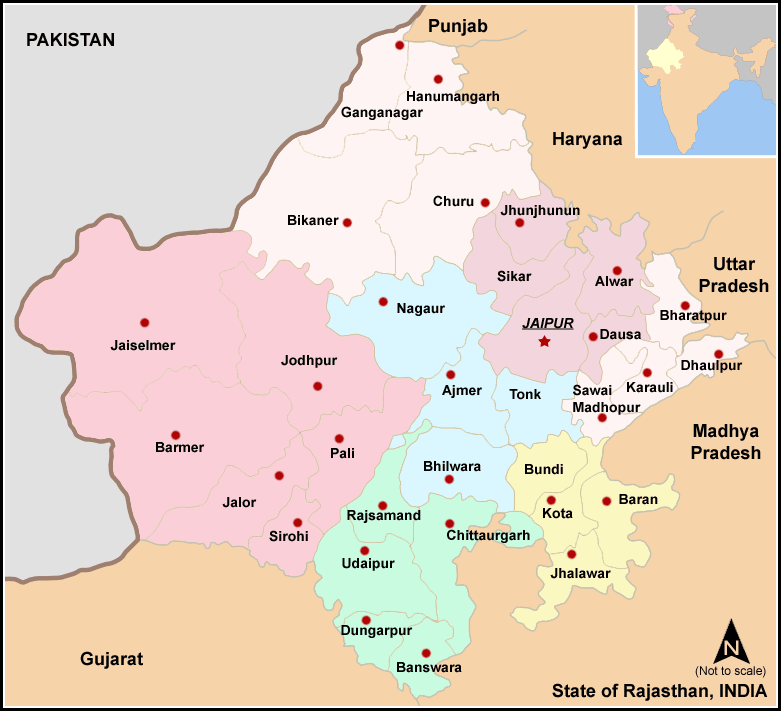
Bagri is the First language of Sri Ganganagar district, Hanumangarh district, Churu district, Bikaner district and a major language in north-western part of Jhunjhunu district in Rajasthan.

Bagri is the First language in Sirsa district.

Bagri is the First language in western Fatehabad district Hisar, Bhiwani, Charkhi dadri.

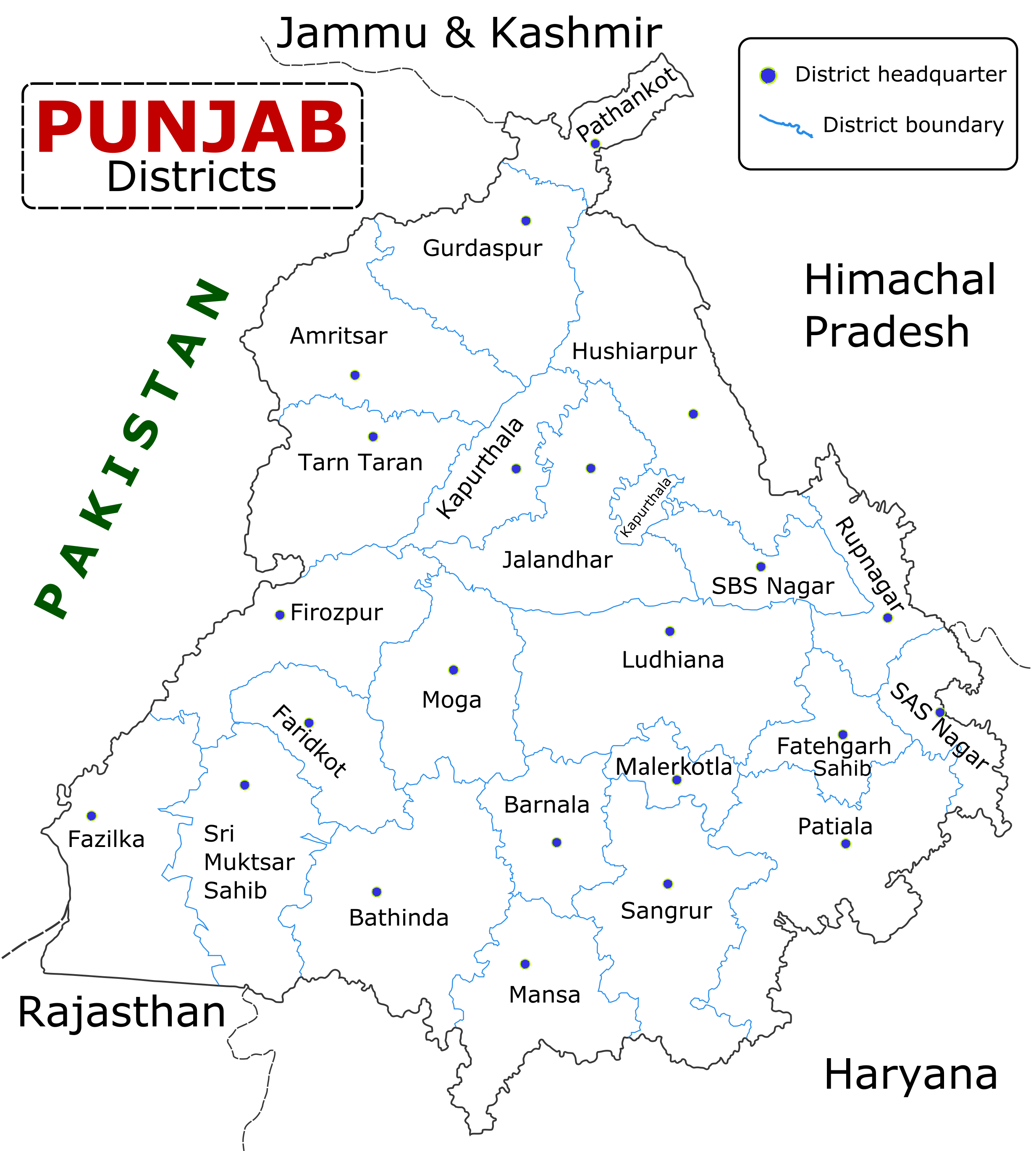
Bagri is the major language in Fazilka district and as a minor language in southern villages of Muktsar district of Southern Punjab (India).

== See also ==
- Rajasthani language
- List of winners of Sahitya Akademi Awards for writing in Rajasthani language
- List of Rajasthani poets
- List of Indian poets#Rajasthani

== Bibliography ==
- Gusain, Lakhan (1999). A Descriptive Grammar of Bagri (PhD). Jawaharlal Nehru University. hdl:10603/16847.
- Gusain, Lakhan (2000). Bagri. Languages of the world. Materials. Munich: LINCOM Europa. ISBN 978-3-89586-398-1.
