= Bikaner district =

Coordinates: 28.0167°N 73.3°E

- District of Rajasthan
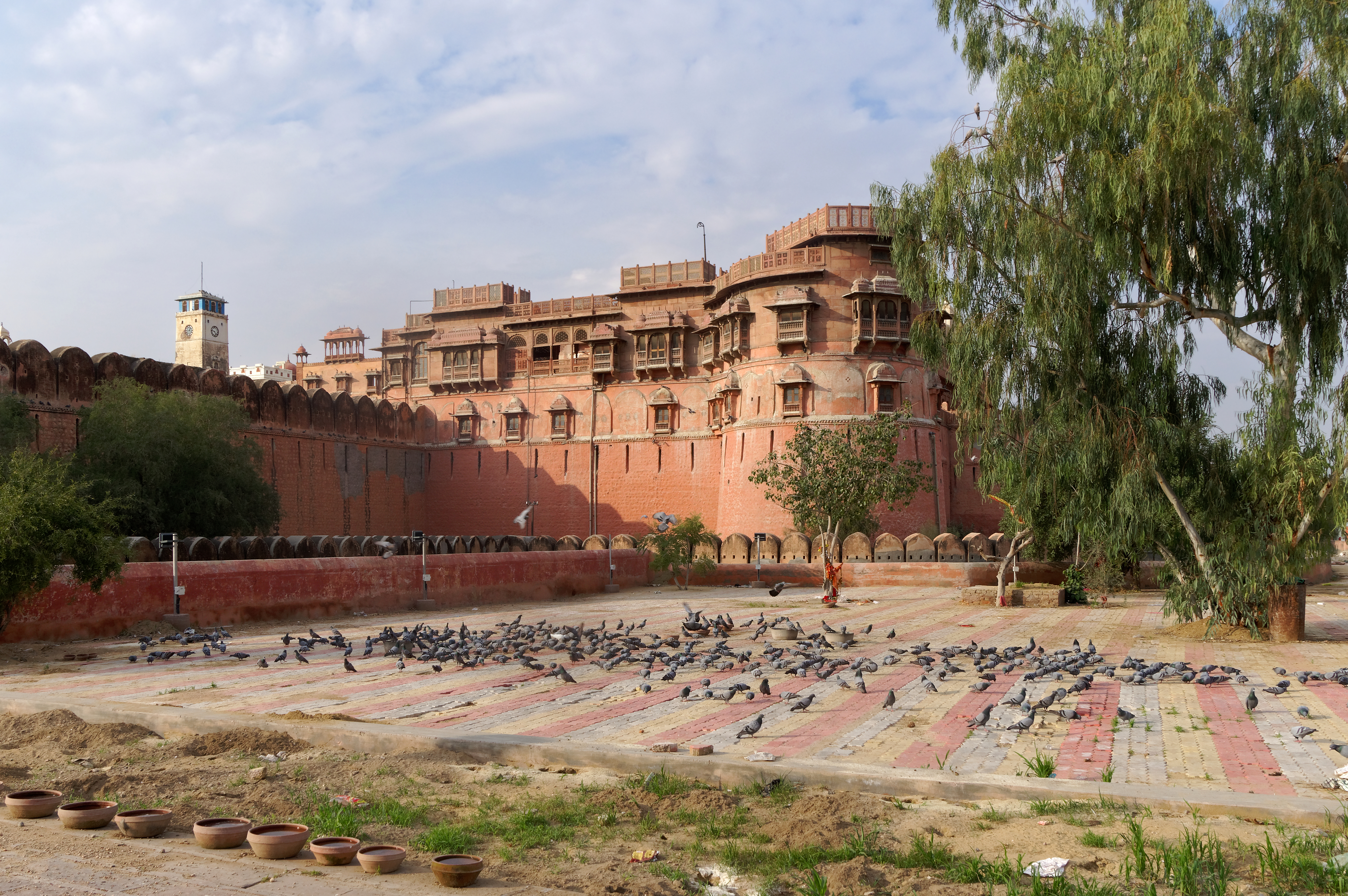
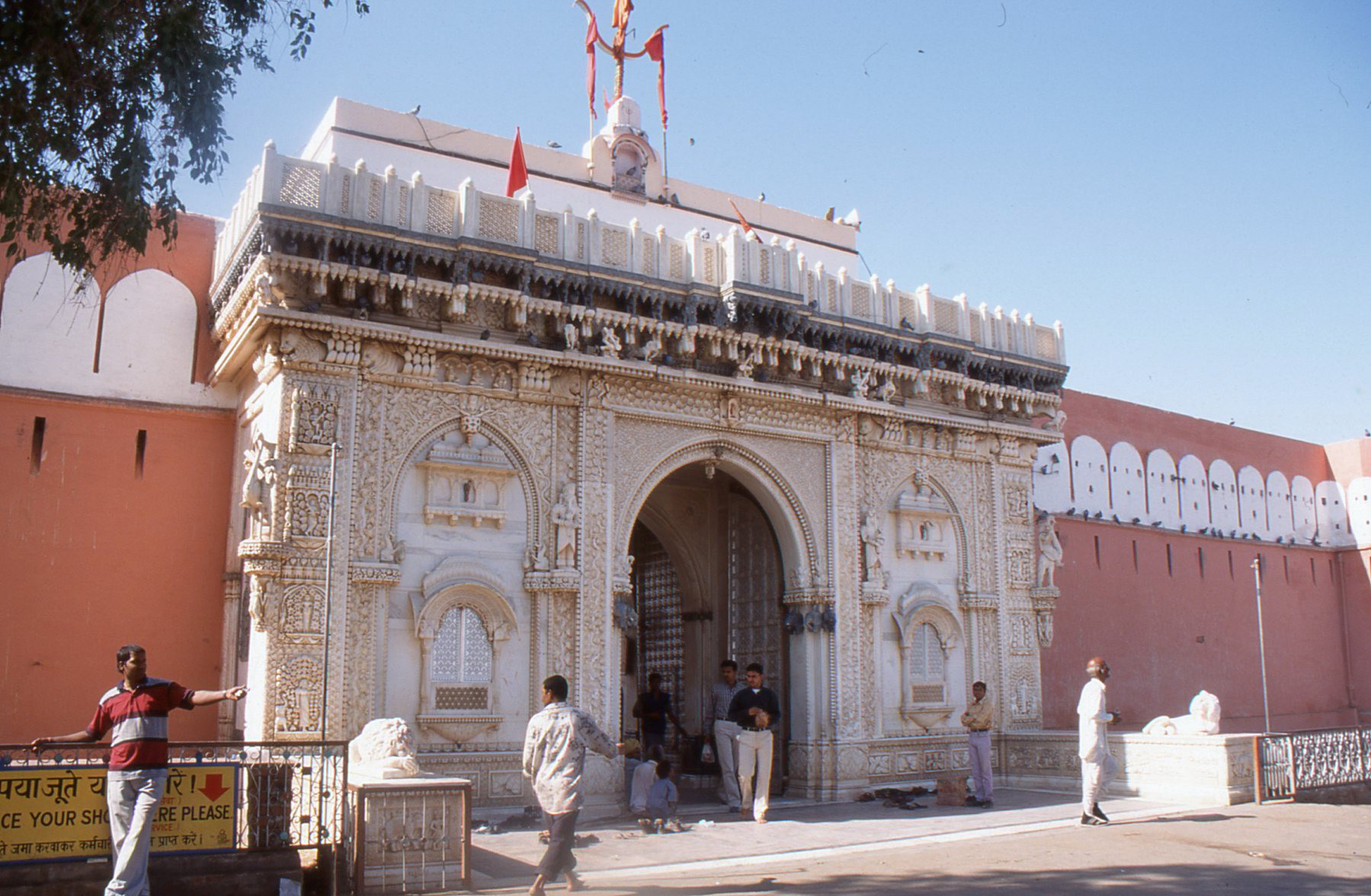
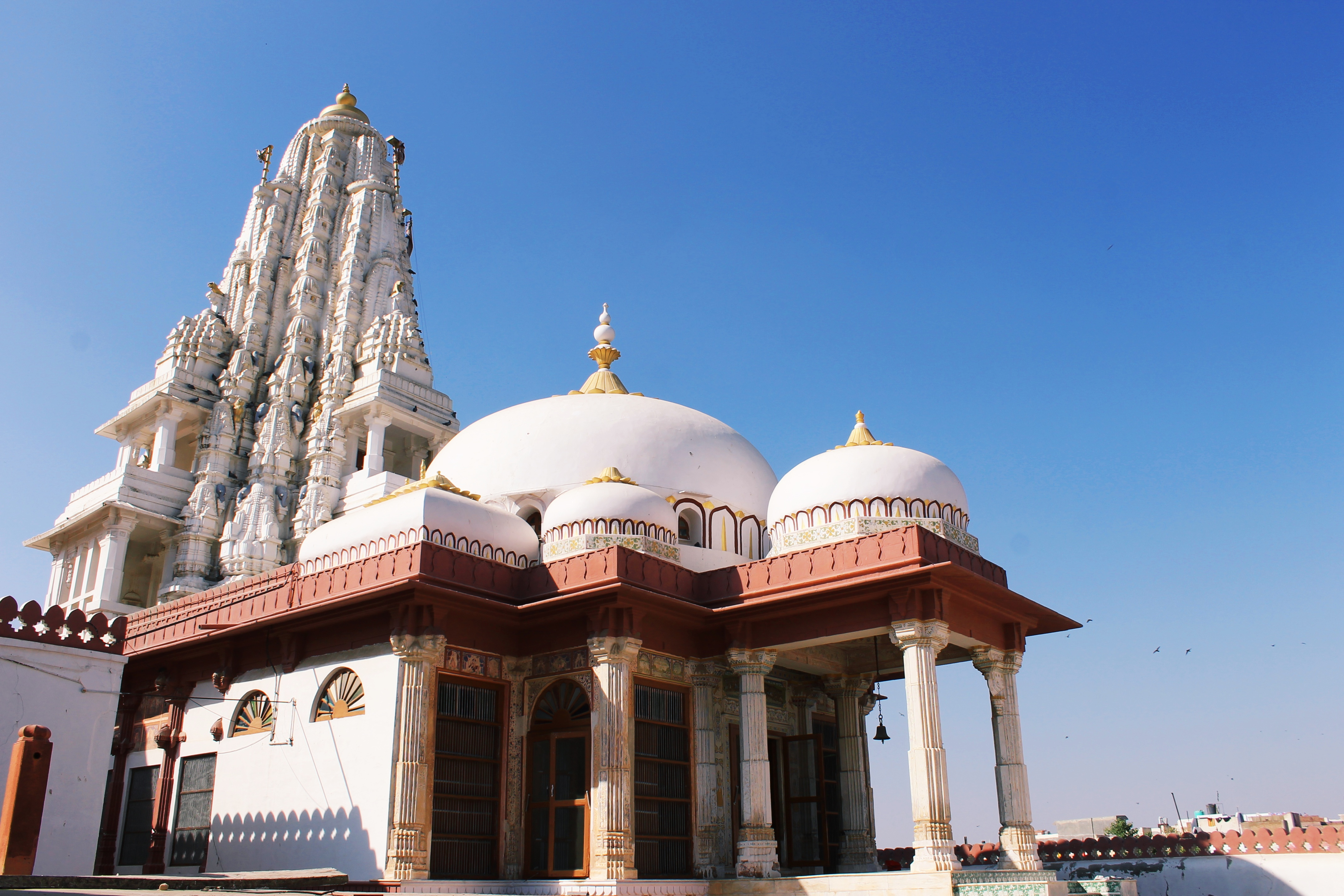
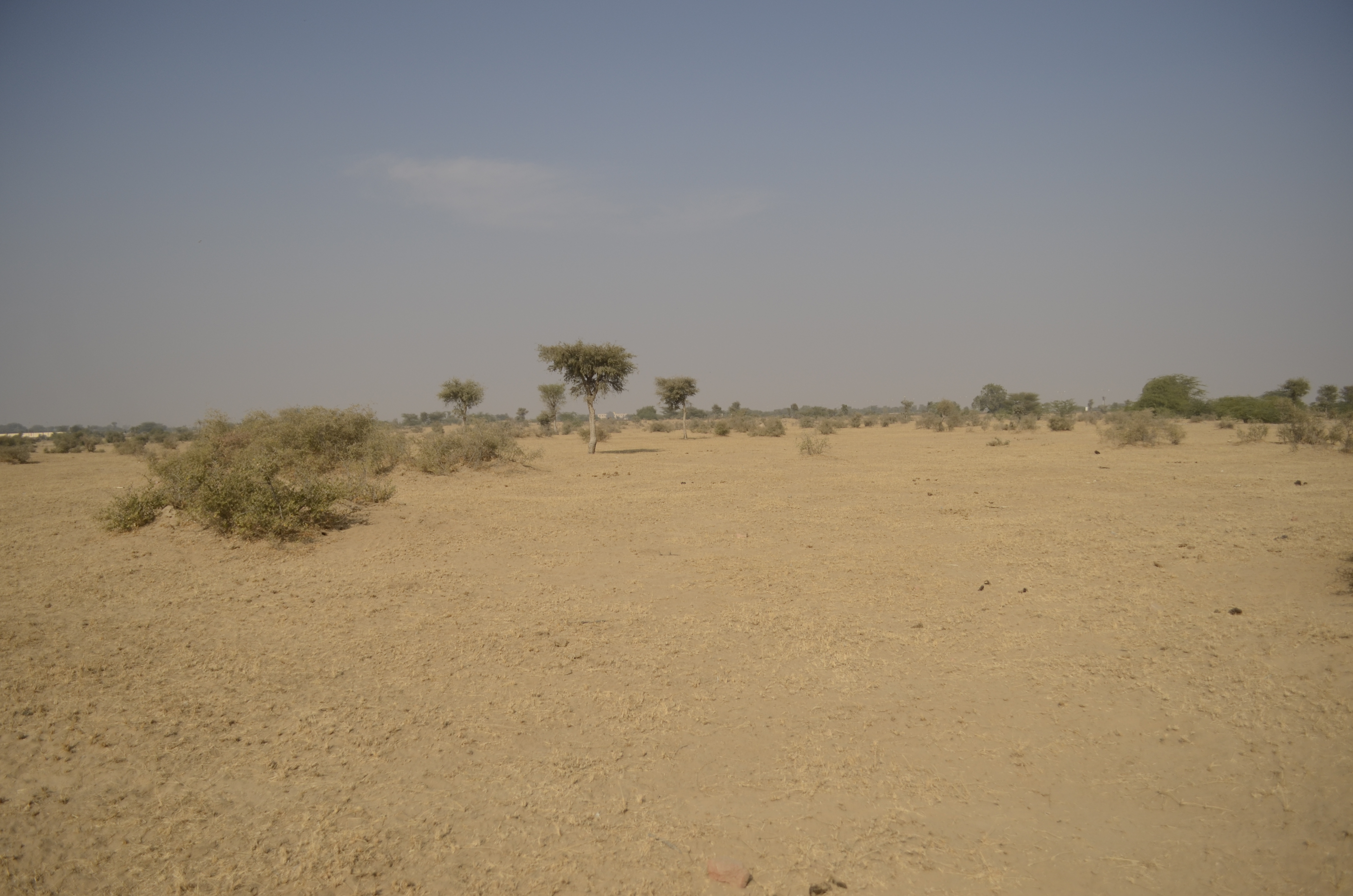
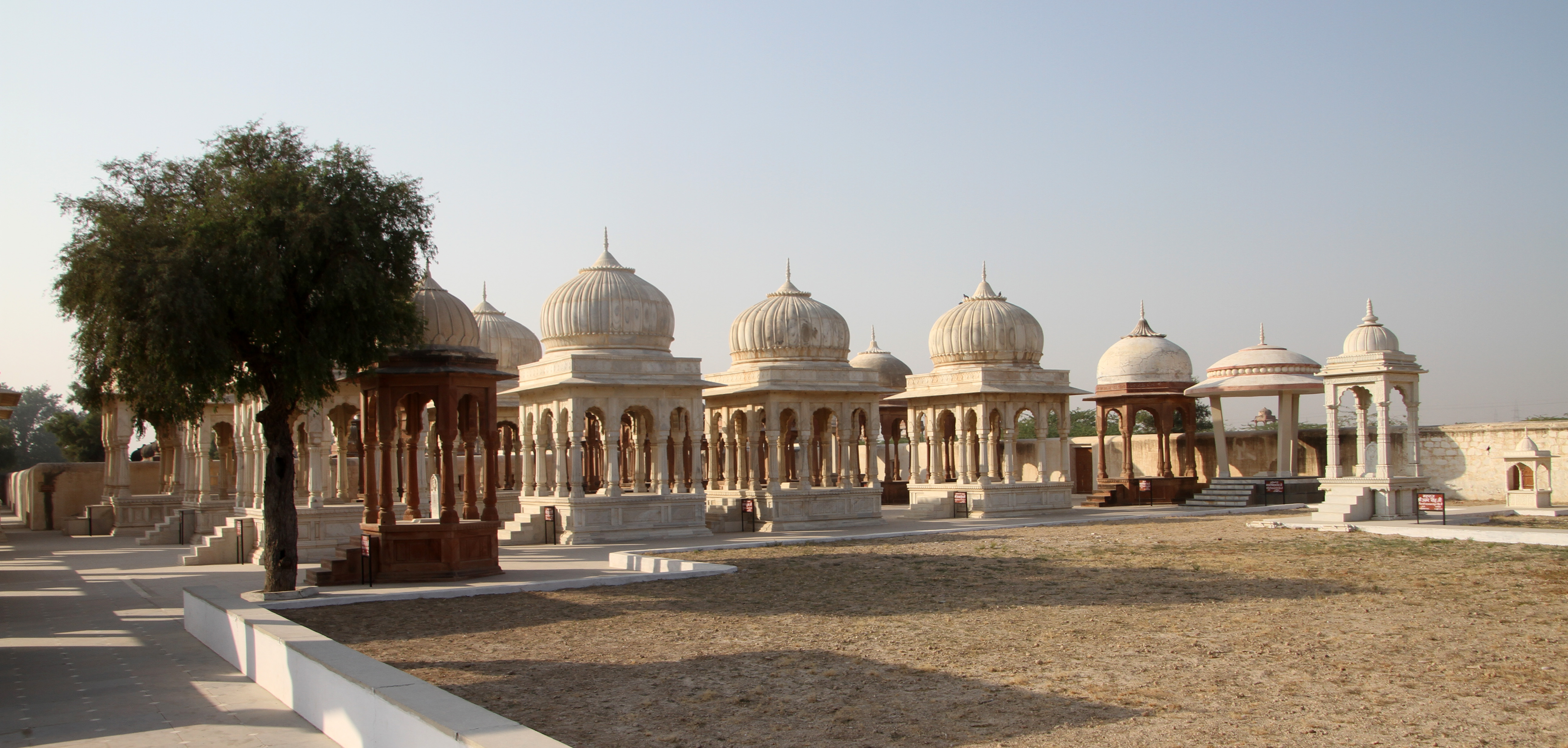
- Clockwise from top-left: Junagarh Fort, Karni Mata Temple, Thar Desert, Devikund Sagar, Bhandasar Jain Temple

- Location of Bikaner district in Rajasthan
- Country: India
- State: Rajasthan
- Division: Bikaner
- Headquarters: Bikaner

Government
  - Divisional Commissioner: Vishram Meena, IAS
  - District Collector & Magistrate: Namrata Vrishni, IAS
  - Superintendent of Police: Kavendra Singh Sagar, IPS
  - I.G. Police: Om Prakash, IPS

Area
  - Total: 30,247 km^{2} (11,678 sq mi)

Population (2011)
  - Total: 2,363,937
  - Density: 78.154/km^{2} (202.42/sq mi)
- Time zone: UTC+05:30 (IST)
- Website: Bikaner District

Bikaner district is a district of the state of Rajasthan in western India. The historic city of Bikaner is the district headquarters. The district is located in Bikaner Division along with the three other districts of Churu, Sri Ganganagar and Hanumangarh.

== Geography ==
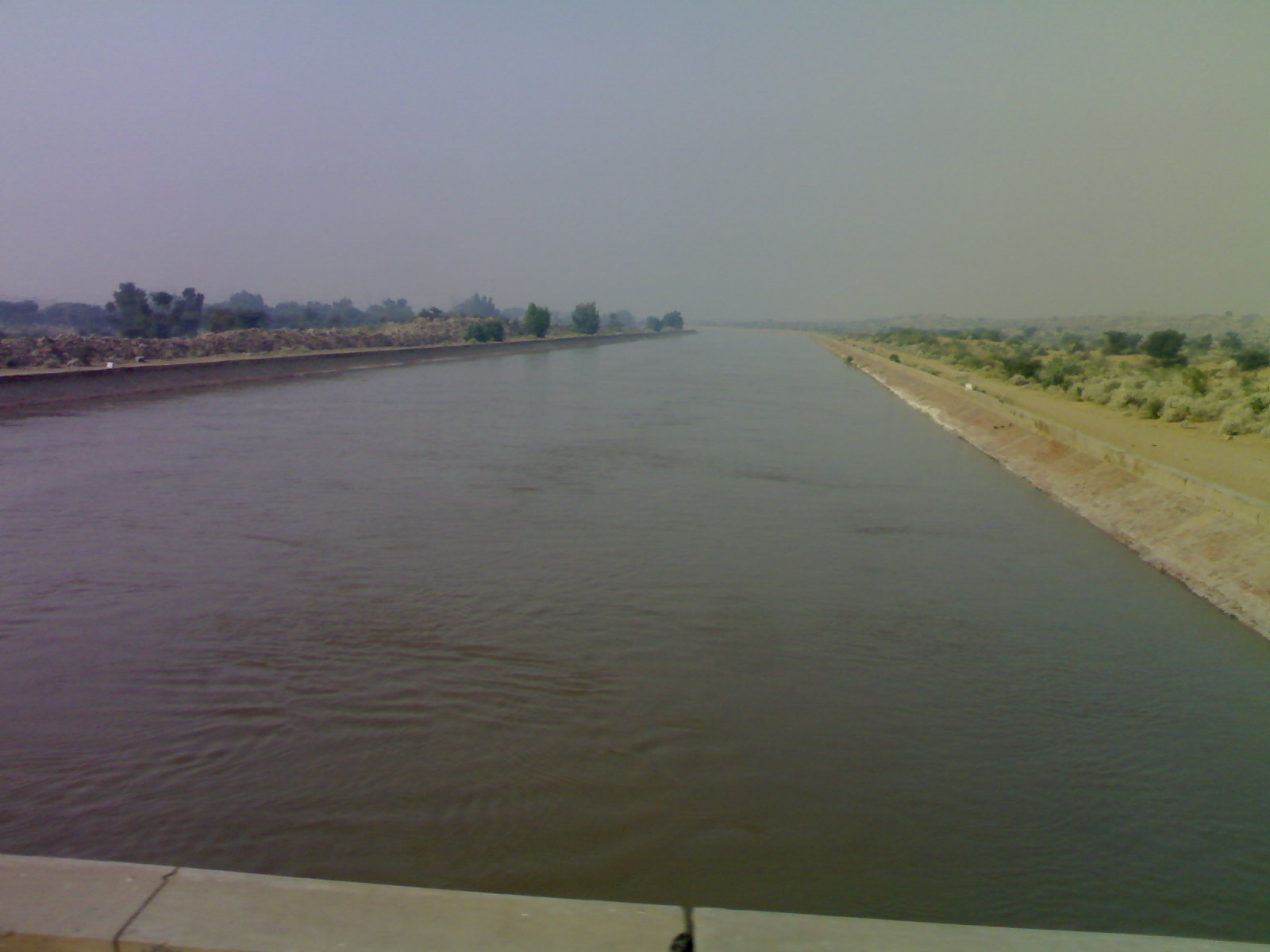
Rajasthan Canal (Indira Gandhi Canal) passing through Thar desert near Chhatargarh Bikaner district

The district is bounded by Ganganagar district and Anupgarh district to the north, Hanumangarh district to the northeast, Churu district to the east, Nagaur district to the southeast, Jodhpur district to the south, Jaisalmer district to the southwest, and Punjab Province of Pakistan to the northwest.

Bikaner district lies in the Thar Desert. The Indira Gandhi Canal, also known as the Rajasthan Canal, runs through the district from northeast to southwest, providing irrigation water for the district.

In October, 2020 an international group of researchers found a lost river that ran through the central Thar Desert; 1,72,000 years ago.

=== Climate ===
Climate data for Bikaner
| Month | Jan | Feb | Mar | Apr | May | Jun | Jul | Aug | Sep | Oct | Nov | Dec | Year |
|---|---|---|---|---|---|---|---|---|---|---|---|---|---|
| Mean daily maximum °C (°F) | 23.0 (73.4) | 25.5 (77.9) | 31.8 (89.2) | 38.2 (100.8) | 41.7 (107.1) | 41.6 (106.9) | 37.8 (100.0) | 36.6 (97.9) | 36.7 (98.1) | 36.2 (97.2) | 30.7 (87.3) | 25.3 (77.5) | 33.8 (92.8) |
| Mean daily minimum °C (°F) | 5.6 (42.1) | 8.8 (47.8) | 15.0 (59.0) | 22.1 (71.8) | 26.8 (80.2) | 28.8 (83.8) | 27.7 (81.9) | 26.8 (80.2) | 24.7 (76.5) | 19.1 (66.4) | 12.1 (53.8) | 6.9 (44.4) | 18.7 (65.7) |
| Average precipitation mm (inches) | 5 (0.2) | 7 (0.3) | 10 (0.4) | 7 (0.3) | 31 (1.2) | 46 (1.8) | 106 (4.2) | 71 (2.8) | 34 (1.3) | 4 (0.2) | 3 (0.1) | 1 (0.0) | 325 (12.8) |
| Average precipitation days | 0.8 | 1.0 | 1.5 | 0.9 | 2.6 | 3.2 | 6.6 | 5.6 | 3.0 | 0.6 | 0.3 | 0.5 | 26.6 |
Source: HKO

== Administrative set-up ==
Bikaner district has 9 sub-divisions, which include Bikaner, Khajuwala, Poogal, Chhatargarh, Lunkaransar, Kolayat, Dungargarh, Nokha and Bajju.

Apart from this, there are 11 tehsils or sub district in the bikaner district.

The above 9 sub-division areas are also tehsils or sub-district areas of the district, and apart from that, a new tehsil or sub-district, Jasrasar, was recently created by the government in the Nokha sub-division area and in the Kolayat sub-division area, tehsil or sub-district Hadan was created.

There are 15 Panchayat Samiti, 1498 villages and 453 gram panchayats. There is one municipal corporation (Bikaner) and six municipal councils: Deshnok, Nokha, Dungargarh, Khajuwala, Loonkaransar and Napasar. The collector and district magistrate (DM) of Bikaner is Smt. Namrata Vrishni.

On 30 November 2024, it was announced in the Rajasthan Government meeting that Bikaner Development Authority will now be formed in Bikaner, under which the city and some nearby villages will be developed. Now along with Bikaner Municipal Corporation, Bikaner Development Authority will also work for urban development.

== Demographics ==
Historical population

| Year | Pop. | ±% p.a. |
|---|---|---|
| 1901 | 216,478 | — |
| 1911 | 236,708 | +0.90% |
| 1921 | 228,562 | −0.35% |
| 1931 | 271,449 | +1.73% |
| 1941 | 360,968 | +2.89% |
| 1951 | 395,462 | +0.92% |

| Year | Pop. | ±% p.a. |
|---|---|---|
| 1961 | 511,317 | +2.60% |
| 1971 | 665,439 | +2.67% |
| 1981 | 973,800 | +3.88% |
| 1991 | 1,381,201 | +3.56% |
| 2001 | 1,902,110 | +3.25% |
| 2011 | 2,363,937 | +2.20% |

1. Hinduism (87.7%)
2. Islam (9.97%)
3. Jainism (1.31%)
4. Sikhism (0.85%)
5. Other or not stated (0.16%)

According to the 2011 census Bikaner district has a population of 2,363,937, roughly equal to the nation of Latvia or the US state of New Mexico. This gives it a ranking of 190th in India (out of a total of 640). The district is 30,247.90 km^{2} (11,678.78 sq mi). The district has a population density of 78 inhabitants per square kilometre (200/sq mi). Its population growth rate over the decade 2001-2011 was 41.42%. Bikaner has a sex ratio of 903 females for every 1,000 males, and a literacy rate of 65.92%. 33.86% of the population lives in urban areas. Scheduled Castes and Scheduled Tribes make up 20.88% and 0.33% of the population respectively.

=== Languages ===
Languages of Bikaner District (2011)
1. Rajasthani (83.0%)
2. Hindi (6.82%)
3. Marwari (5.86%)
4. Punjabi (1.27%)
5. Sindhi (0.98%)
6. Saraiki (0.37%)
7. Others (1.65%)

At the time of the 2011 Census of India, 81.09% of the population spoke Rajasthani, 14.94% Marwari, 2.05% Hindi, 1.71% Urdu, 0.98% Sindhi and 0.37% Saraiki as their first language.

== See also ==
- Bikaner
- Bikaner division
- Nokha
- Shri Dungargarh
- Kolayat
