= Rojhri dham =

- Hindu temple
- Interactive map of Rojhri dham
- Country: India
- State: Rajasthan
- District: Anupgarh

Government
  - Body: Rojhri village

Languages
  - Official: Hindi
- Time zone: UTC+5:30 (IST)
- ISO 3166 code: RJ-IN
- Nearest city: Anupgarh
- Civic agency: Rojhri village

Rojhri Dham is a complex of religious sites dedicated to the worship of the Hindu deity Hanuman. It is situated in Rawla Mandi tehsil of Anupgarh district of Rajasthan.

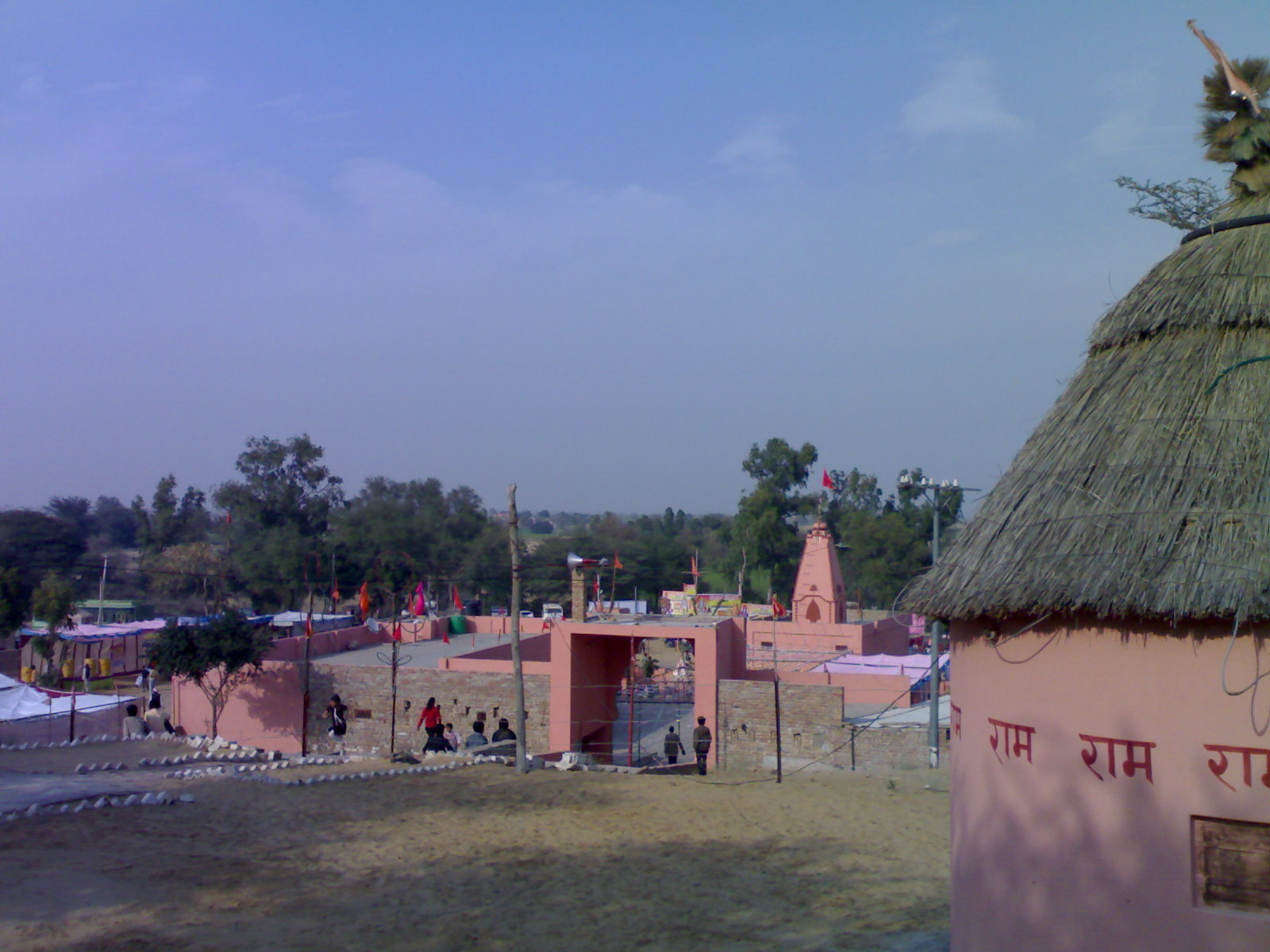
a full view of temple complex from Ram Kutia.

Dham attracts many local worshippers throughout the year. On Chaitra Purnima and Ashvin Purnima every year, large jagrans are organized, where thousands of people assemble to pay their homage to the deity. Hanuman Sewa Samiti manages the Temple and Jagarans. The temple of Hanuman is situated on right side of Anupgarh-Bikaner road, about one kilometer from Rojhri Village.

== Location ==
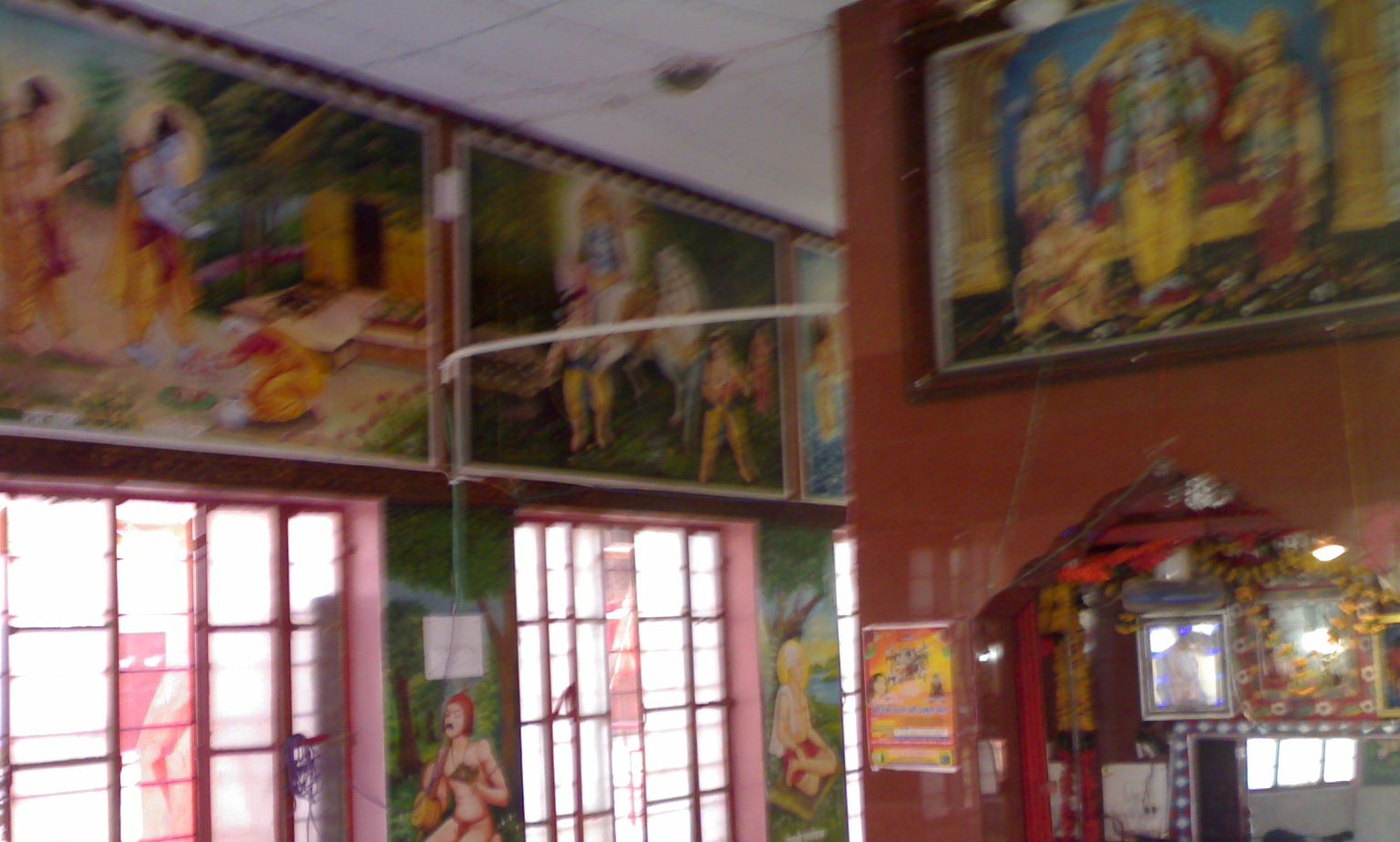
Wall paintings.

The temple of Hanuman is situated on right side of Anupgarh-Bikaner road about one kilometer from Rojhri Village. It is approximately 55 kilometres from Anupgarh, 22 kilometres from Rawla Mandi and 17 kilometres from Chhatargarh. Rojhri village is under the jurisdiction of the Gharsana Panchayat Samiti and is well connected to Sri Ganganagar and Bikaner by a regular bus service run by the Rajasthan State Road Transport Corporation. Gharsana, Rawla Mandi, Chhatargarh, and Jalwali, are the nearest villages to Rojhri Dham. The city is about 30 kilometers from the town of New mandi Gharsana.

== Temples ==
The main temple is associated with Hanuman and contains an idol to the deity. The walls are decorated with colorful paintings of other Hindu gods and saints. Other small temples include Shiva temple, situated to the right of Hanuman temple.

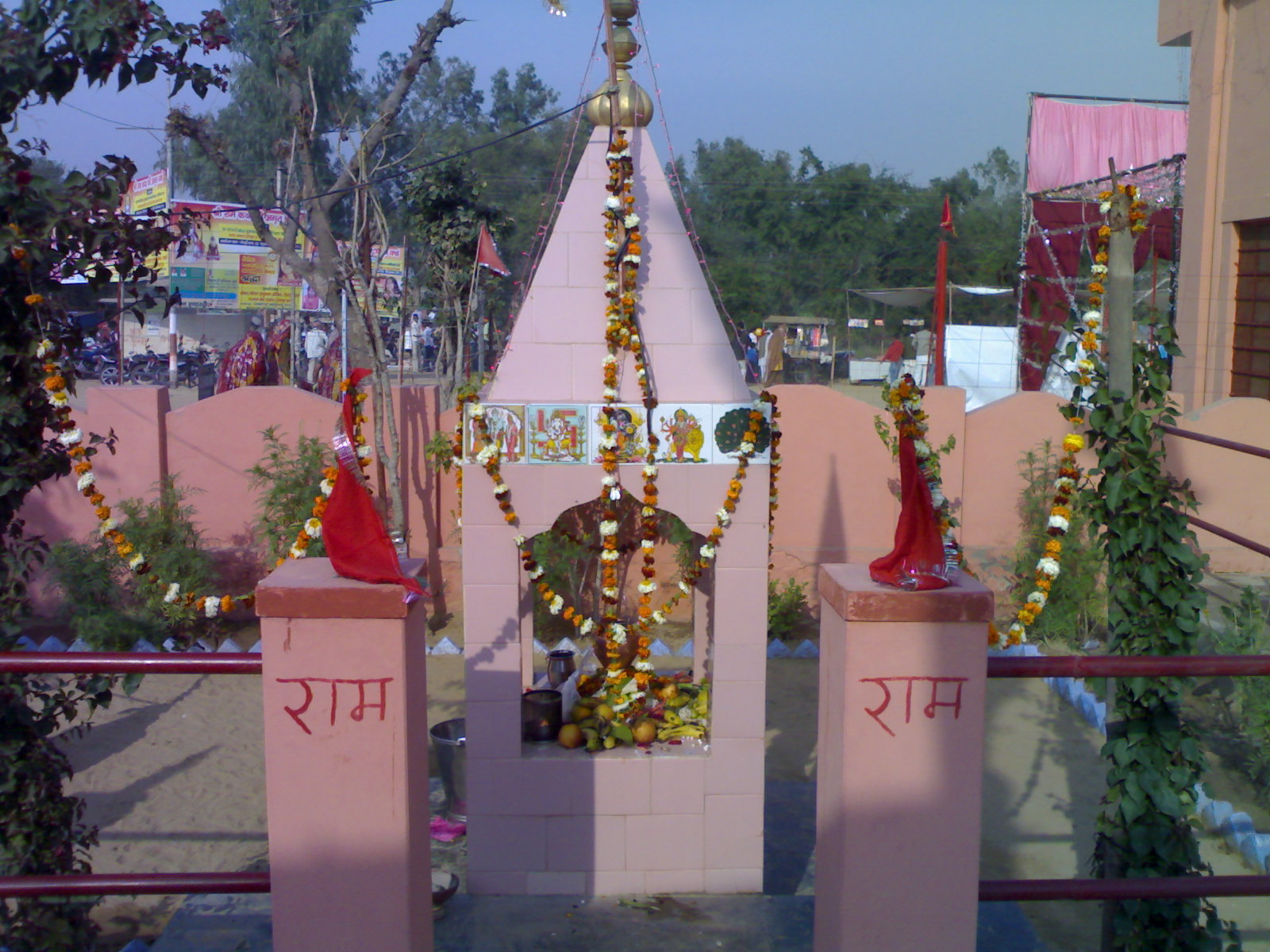
Shiva temple.

Ram temple and Ram kutia are situated on a sandy dune nearby.

== Management ==
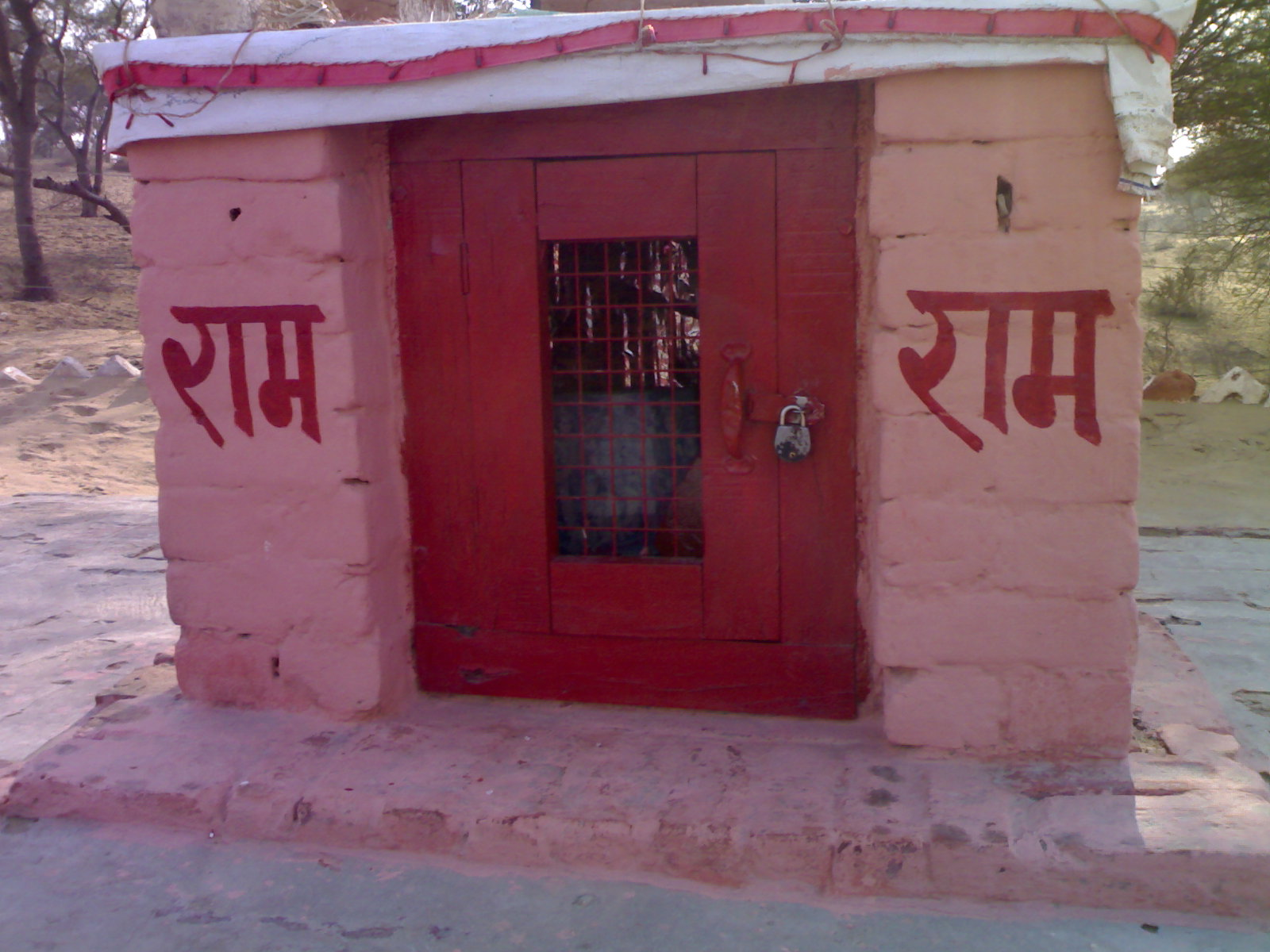
Small Ram temple on sandy dune.

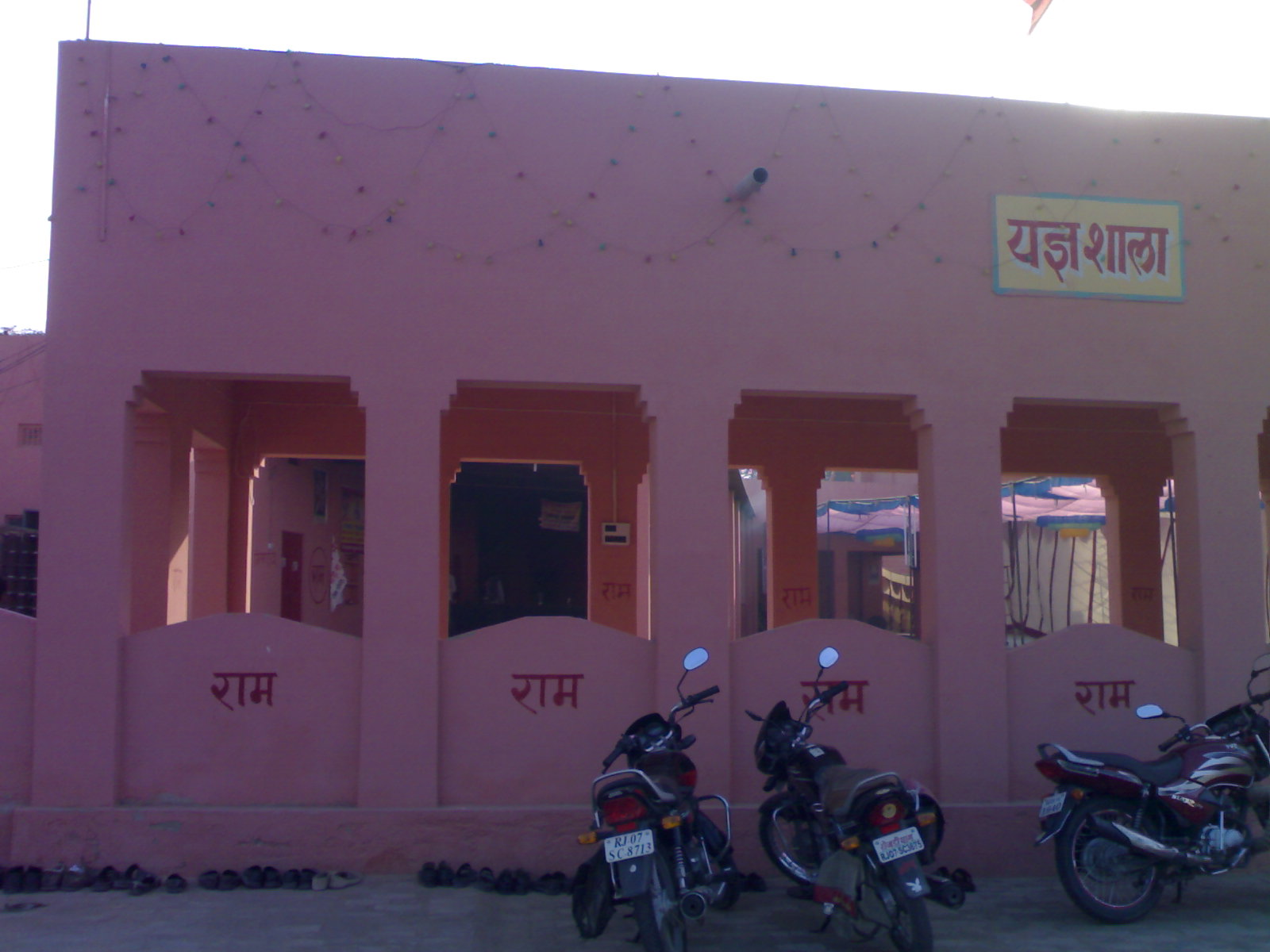
Yagyashala where religious rituals are conduncted with mantras.

Rojhri Dham Sewa Samiti manages the Jagrans and the worship in the temple.
