= Anupgarh district =

District of Rajasthan state in India

- Former district
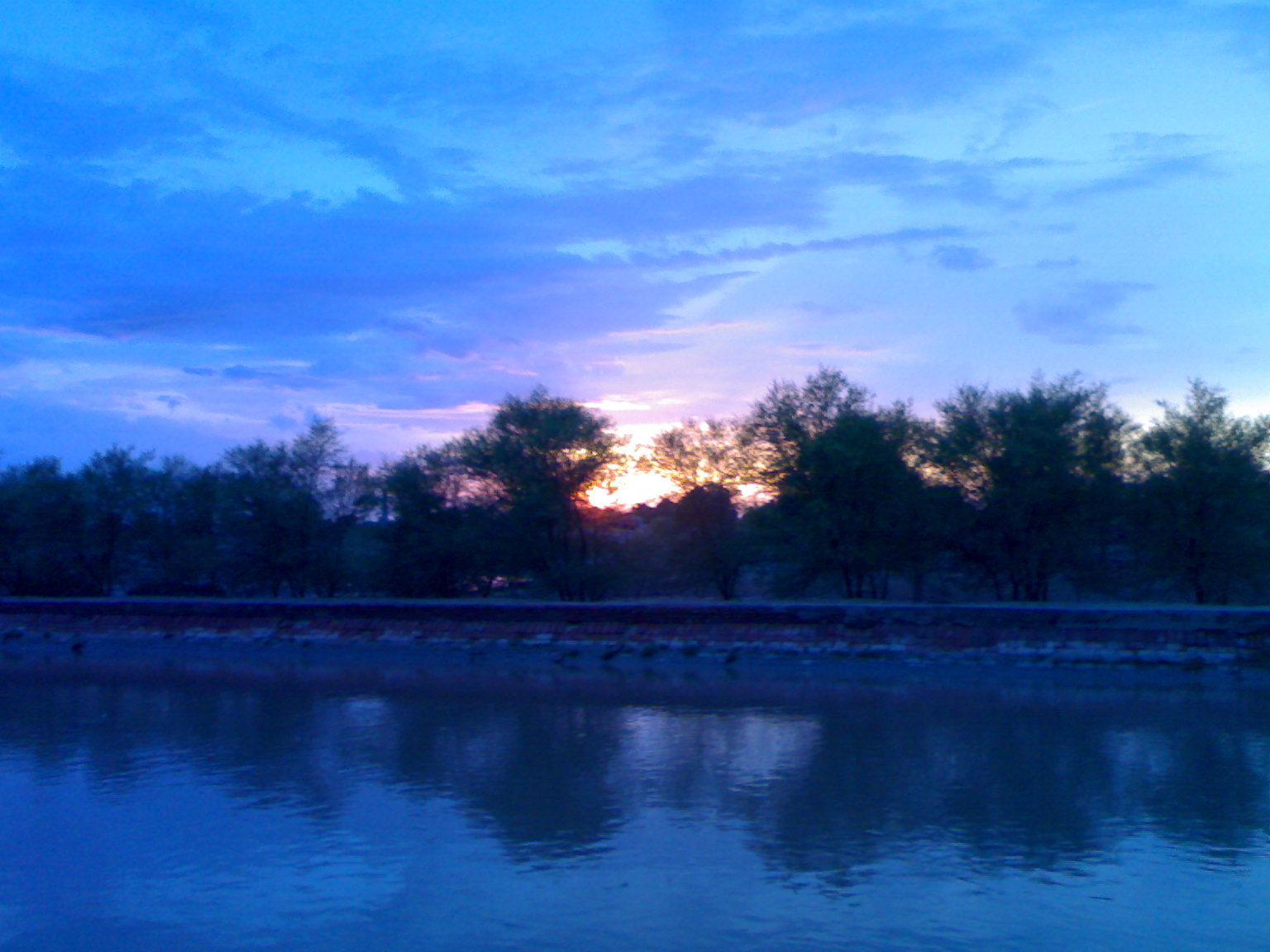
- View of canal in tehsil Rawla Mandi of Anupgarh district

- Location of Anupgarh district in Rajasthan
- Coordinates (Anupgarh district headquarters): 29°11′22″N 73°12′30″E
- Country: India
- State: Rajasthan
- Division: Bikaner
- Established: 7 August 2023
- Headquarters: Anupgarh
- Tehsils: Raisinghnagar; Anupgarh; Sri Vijaynagar; Gharsana; Rawla Mandi

Government
  - Type: State Government
  - Body: Government of Rajasthan
  - District Magistrate: Avdhesh Meena, IAS
  - Superintendent of Police: Rajendra Kumar, IPS

Area
  - Total: 4,713.96 km^{2} (1,820.07 sq mi)

Population (2011)
  - Total: 698,478
  - Density: 148.172/km^{2} (383.764/sq mi)

Demographics
  - Literacy: 58.18 %
  - Sex ratio: 899/1000

Languages
  - Official: Hindi
  - Additional_official: English
  - Most spoken: Punjabi, Bagri, Rajasthani
- Time zone: UTC+05:30 (IST)
- Major highways: RJ SH 3
- Website: official website

Anupgarh district was a new north-west district of Rajasthan state in India. It was established on 5 August 2023 after carving it out of Sri Ganganagar District. It was re-merged in Sri Ganganagar District with a notification issued by Rajasthan Government on 29 December 2024.

== History ==
=== Ancient history ===
Traces of Indus Valley Civilisation have been found at Baror and Binjor near Anupgarh city.

=== Mediaeval period ===
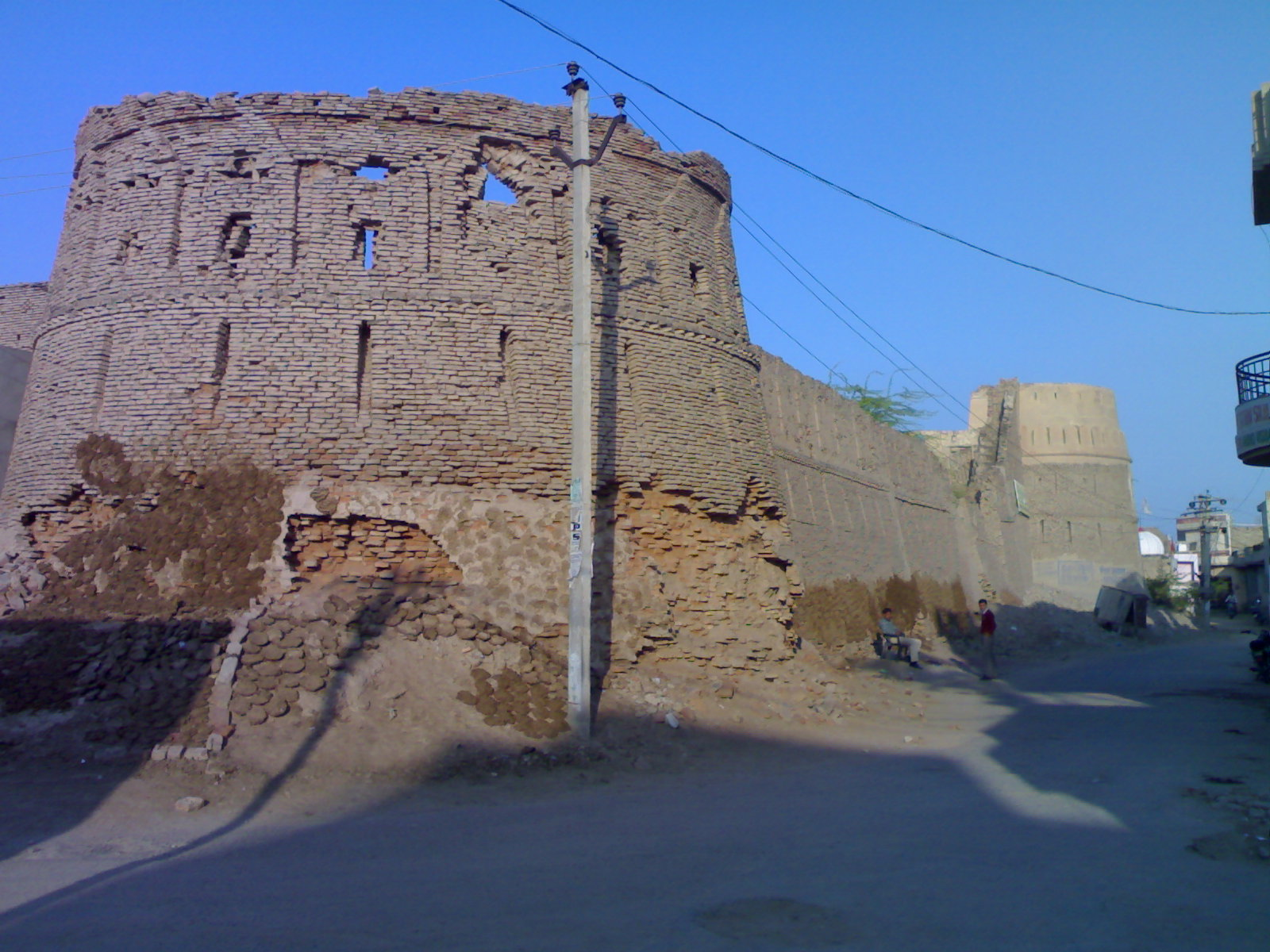
Medieval fort of Anupgarh

The ancient name of Anupgarh city was Chugher. Chugher (Anupgarh) and its surrounding area was occupied by Bhati rulers. The area was occupied by the removal of Bhati chiefs by Maharaja of the Bikaner princely state under the leadership of chief Bikaji Anoop Singh in 1678 and constructed a fortress whose name was Anupgarh.

=== Post-partition and modern history ===
After the partition of India in 1947, princely states were abolished and Anupgarh being a Dyodhiwale Rajvi, was made a separate tehsil under Sri Ganganagar District.

On 17 March 2023, following 11 years of peaceful protest by the local citizens under the leadership of Advocate Suresh Kumar Bishnoi, Jalandhar singh Toor with the support of farmers and other leaders, it was carved out of Sri Ganganagar as a separate district.

- After notification on 5 August 2023 the district was established carved out with parts from Ganganagar district and Bikaner district.
- On 6 October 2023, the Government of Rajasthan issued a notification regarding reorganisation of the Anupgarh district, according to this notification Chhatargarh and Khajuwala tehsils were remerged with Bikaner district.

== Demographics ==
=== Population ===
According to 2011 census of India, the total population of what was now Anupgarh district was 698,478. 114919 (16.45%) lived in urban areas. Scheduled Castes and Scheduled Tribes made up 307,944 (44.09%) and 3,760 (0.60%) of the population respectively.

Total population, total families and population density of tehsils according to 2011 census
Tehsil	Population	Total families	Population density, people/km^{2}
Raisinghnagar	196,455	37,854	148/km^{2}
Anupgarh	1,84,423	36,488	159/km^{2}
Gharsana (including Rawla Mandi)	1,71,830	34,350	124/km^{2}
Sri Vijaynagar	1,45,770	28,721	172/km^{2}
Total/average of Anupgarh District	6,98,478	1,37,413	150.75/km^{2}

=== Languages ===
Languages of Anupgarh district (2011 census)
1. Punjabi (32.8%)
2. Bagri (29.0%)
3. Rajasthani (28.0%)
4. Hindi (4.99%)
5. Marwari (2.55%)
6. Others (2.62%)

At the time of the 2011 census, 32.80% Punjabi, 29.04% Bagri, 28.00% Rajasthani, 4.99% Hindi and 2.55% Marwari as their first language. Along the India-Pakistan border, the language merges with the Riasti dialect of Saraiki.

=== Religion ===
Religious profile of tehsils according to 2011 census
Tehsil	Hindu	Sikh	Muslim	Jain	Buddhist	Christians	Not stated	Others
Raisinghnagar	1,35,965	58,857	1,118	158	110	161	48	38
Anupgarh	1,25,624	56,119	2,394	6	34	145	94	7
Gharsana (including Rawla Mandi)	1,22,440	40,412	8,620	130	51	96	52	29
Sri Vijaynagar	1,11,089	32,468	1,700	20	156	268	67	2
Total of Anupgarh District	4,95,118	1,87,856	13,832	314	463	558	261	76

Religions in Anupgarh District (2011)
Religion	Percent
Hinduism	70.89%
Sikhism	26.90%
Islam	1.98%
Other or not stated	0.23%

Census 2011 shows that there were 4,95,118 Hindus and 1,87,856 Sikhs in the district with Muslims being third largest community in the district with around 13,832 individuals.

=== Literacy rate ===
Average literacy rate and sex ratio in Anupgarh district is 64.25% and 898.5/1000 respectively.

According to census 2011, with 69.91% literacy, and a ratio of 908 females to 1000 males. Raisinghnagar is the most literate tehsil in Anupgarh district, with 69.33% of male literates and 52.23% of female literates living in the tehsil. On the other hand, Gharsana shows the lowest literacy rate of 65.76% with 65.54% of males and 47.28% of females literate in the tehsil. Gharsana tehsil had a sex ratio of 892 females/1000 males in year 2011 which was least among all tehsils of Anupgarh District. Raisinghnagar had highest sex ratio of 902 females/1000 males.

Total literacy rate and sex ratio among tehsils and Anupgarh district according to 2011 census
Tehsil	Total literacy rate	Male literacy	Female literacy	Sex ratio females/1000 males
Raisinghnagar	69.91%	69.33%	52.23%	908
Anupgarh	66.34%	65.39%	48.57%	900
Gharsana (including Rawla Mandi)	65.76%	65.54%	47.28%	892
Sri Vijaynagar	66.68%	64.55%	48.98	894
Literacy rate and sex ratio in district	64.25%	63.45%	45.72%	899

== Government and politics ==
=== Assembly constituencies ===
- Raisinghnagar Assembly constituency
- Anupgarh Assembly constituency

=== Administrative setup of Anupgarh District ===
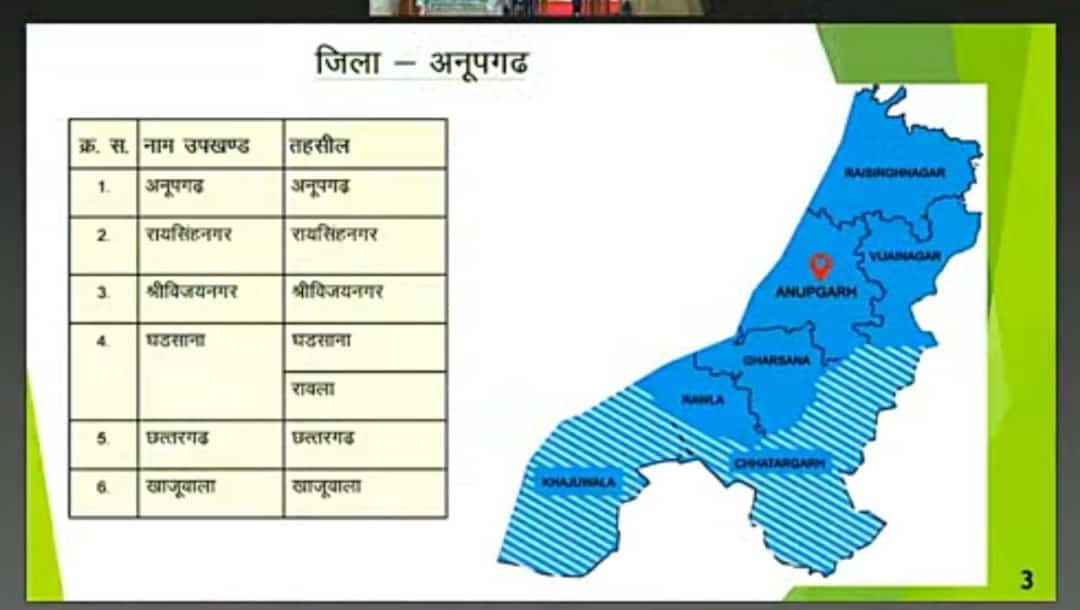
District map of Anupgarh

==== Tehsils in Anupgarh District ====
There were five tehsils in the Anupgarh district.

- Anupgarh
- Shri Vijaynagar
- Gharsana
- Rawla Mandi
- Raisinghnagar

==== Sub tehsils in Anupgarh District ====
In Anupgarh District, there were five sub tehsils.

- Sameja
- Muklawa
- Jaitsar
- Ramsinghpur
- 365 Head

==== Panchayat samitis in Anupgarh District ====
There are six panchayat samitis or block panchayats and 177 gram panchayats in Anupgarh district.

- Anupgarh - 32 gram panchayats
- Raisinghnagar - 41 gram panchayats
- Vijaynagar - 29 gram panchayats
- Gharsana - 36 gram panchayats

== Recent history ==
On 28 December 2024, the Cabinet of Rajasthan decided not to retain nine new districts (Anupgarh, Dudu, Gangapur City, Jaipur Rural, Jodhpur Rural, Kekri, Neem Ka Thana, Sanchore, and Sanchore, and Shahpura) along with the three newly created divisions (Banswara, Pali, and Sikar).

== Tourist attractions ==
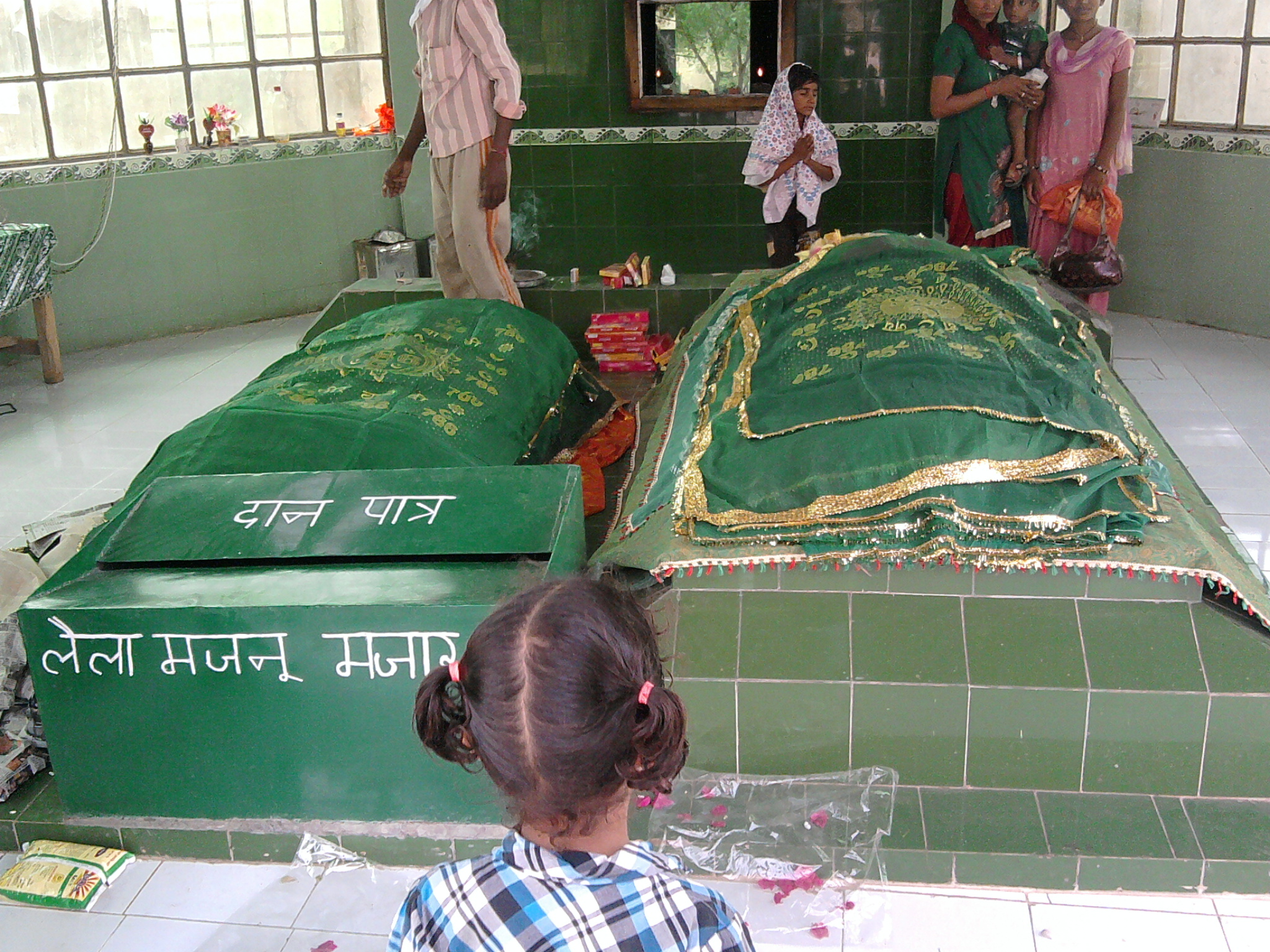
The graves of Layla and Majnun, where people come to seek blessings

- Shivpur Fort - Vijaynagar
- Anupgarh Fort - Anupgarh
- Baror Harrapan Archaeological site - Anupgarh
- Gurudwara Budhdha Johar - Dabla
- Bishnoi Mandir & Amrita Devi Park - Dabla
- Laila Majhnu Mazar - Binjor
- Central Farm Jaitsar
- Rojhari Bala ji temple

== Gallery ==
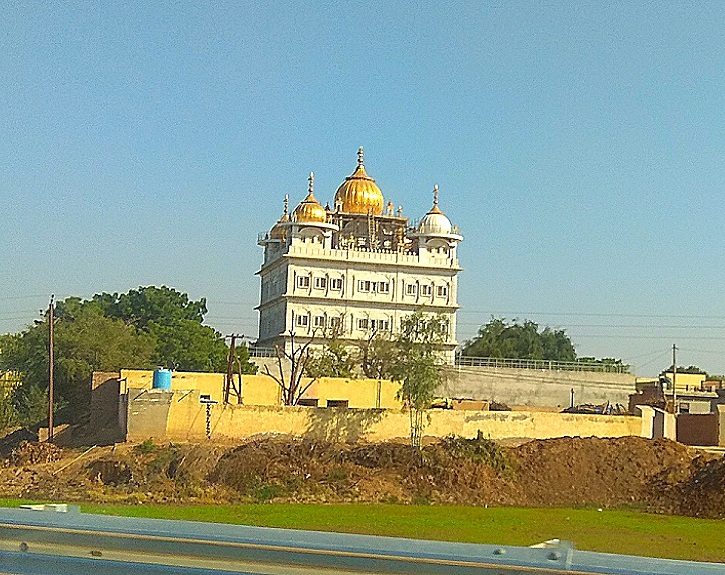
Baba Deva Singh Radha Swami Dera

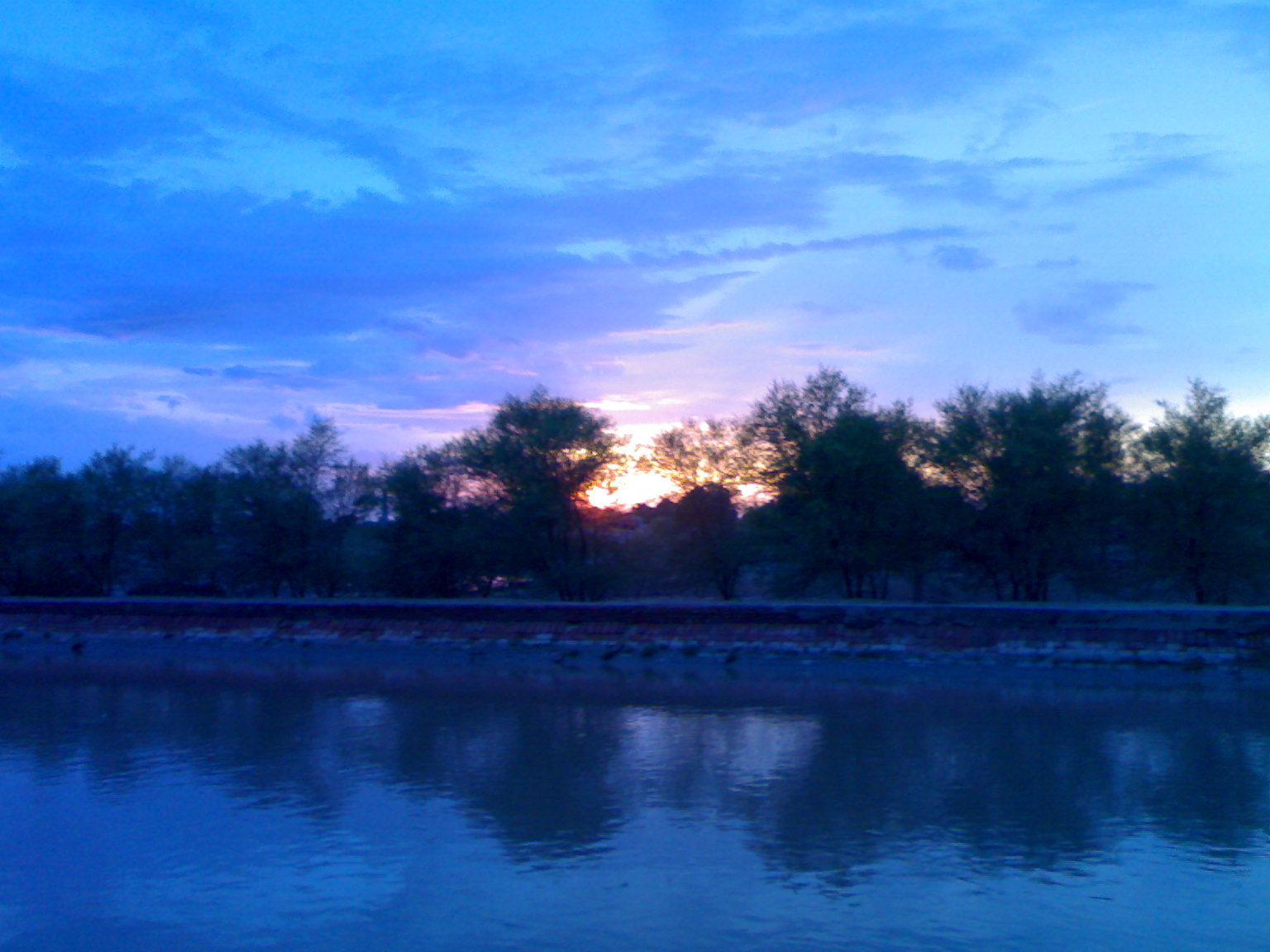
View of canal during sunset in Rawla

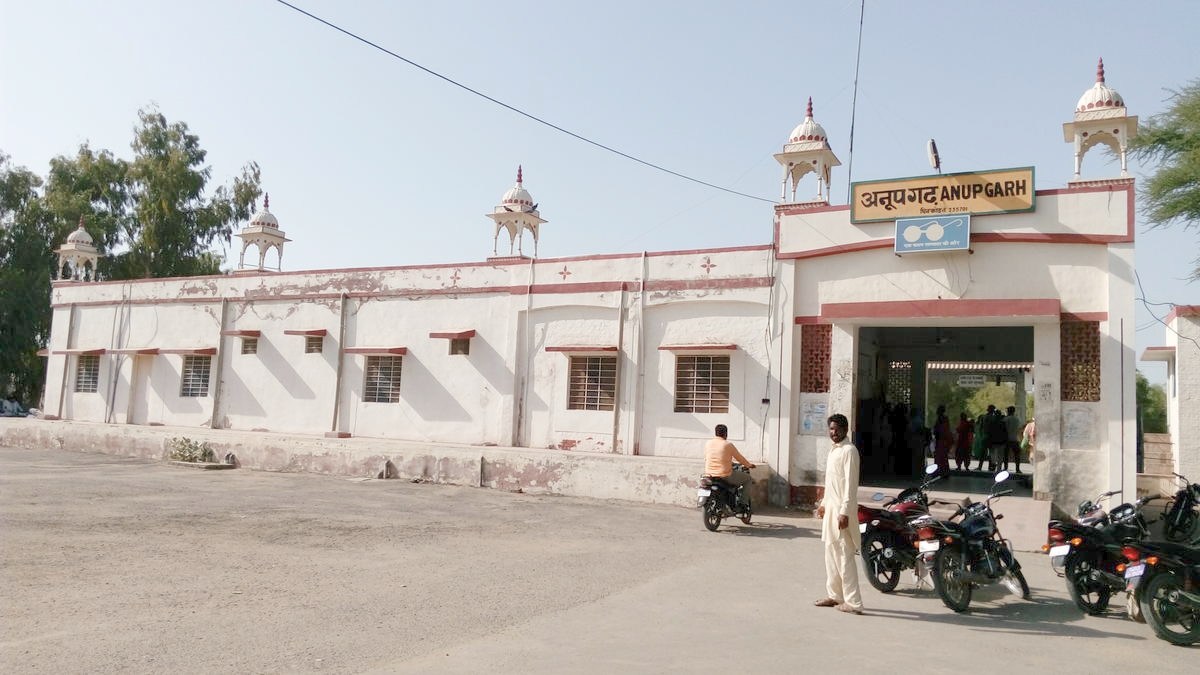
Anupgarh Railway Station

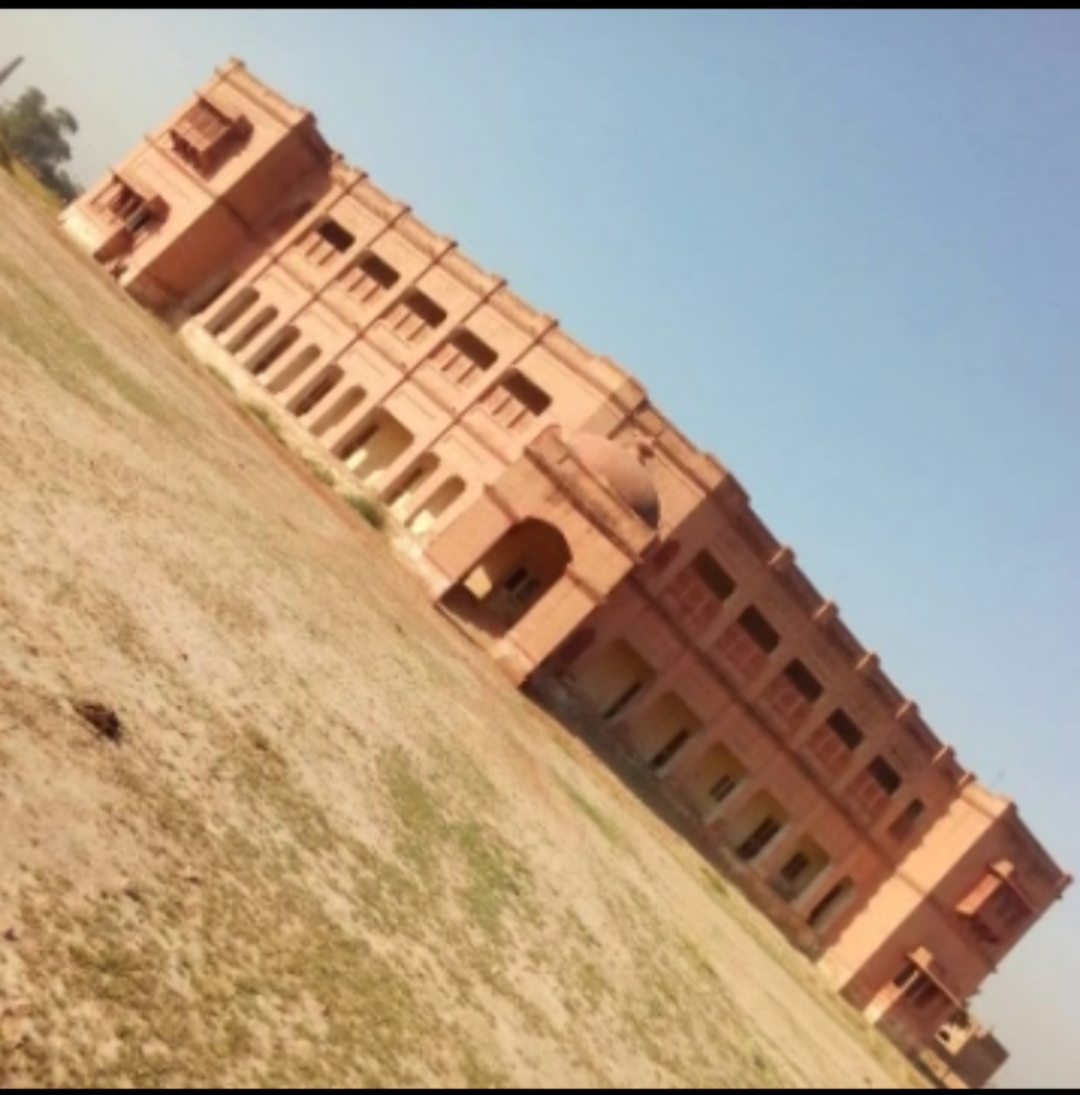
Shivpuri fort, Sri Vijaynagar
