= Rawla Mandi =

- Town
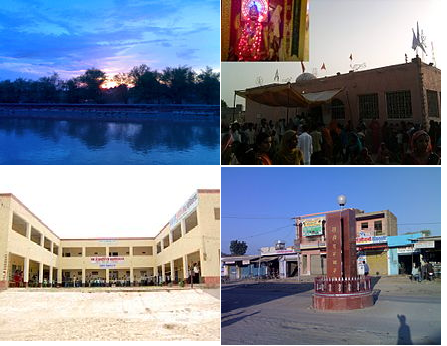
- Clockwise from top: Sunset view on canal, Baba Ramdev Temple during a fair, Rawla Mandi 's first college M J Kumheriya college, Shaheed Smarak (Martyr's memorial) at Rojhri Chowk; it is built in the memory of persons who died during farmer's movement in 2004

- Location in Rajasthan, India
- Coordinates: 28.844693°N 72.889947°E
- Country: India
- State: Rajasthan
- District: Sri Ganganagar
- Tehsil: Rawla mandi

Government
  - Sarpanch: Mr Gangabishan Poonia
- Elevation: 145 m (476 ft)

Population (2011)
  - Total: 12,947

Languages
  - Official: Hindi, English
  - Native language: Rajasthan, Bagri, Marwari
  - Regional language: Rajasthani, Sindhi
- Time zone: UTC+5:30 (IST)
- PIN: 335708
- Telephone code: 01506
- ISO 3166 code: RJ-IN
- Vehicle registration: RJ-13
- Climate: BWhw (Köppen)
- Avg. summer temperature: °F
- Avg. winter temperature: °F

Rawla Mandi is a town in Rawla Mandi tehsil of Sri Ganganagar district of Rajasthan, India. It is located on Gharsana-Khajuwala road,180 km from district headquarter Sri Ganganagar and 27 km away from Gharsana and 50 km from Anupgarh. The state capital Jaipur is 480 km away, and national capital New Delhi is 500 km away. It is 33 km from Khajuwala and 122 km from Bikaner. It is 30 km far from Indo-Pak(India-Pakistan) border. Rawla mandi known as 8PSD (B) gram panchayt. Rawla Gaon (10 Kd) Also located in West of rawla mandi

== Extent, geography and climate ==
=== Geography and climate ===
Rawla Mandi is in the Thar Desert. Thorny shrubs and sandy dunes are the basic characteristics of this region. Kikar(Acacia), Aak (Calotropis procera), Khejari (Prosopis cineraria), Khimp (Leptadenia pyrotechnica), Lathiya, Laana and Booiin (Aerva tomentosa), Tumba(Citrullus colocynthis) make natural vegetation of this area. According to experts Rawla area is enriched with fertile soil for crops. Gypsum/Chuna rocks are assets of this region. The waters of Ignp canal has brought changes to flora and fauna and agriculture of wheat, mustard, cotton, Guar, pulses and Jawar has given a composite form of sandy dunes and green fields. This region with Gharsana is called cotton-belt but now things are changing. Average annual rainfall has fallen dramatically in the last few years. Since key source of irrigation is canal-water, water supply is inadequate for agriculture. Now many farmers are moving to a new trend of irrigation by tubewells.

=== Extent and area ===
Rawla Mandi lies roughly between 72.87'72"E to 72.90'E longitudes and 28.83'25"N to 28.85N' latitudes. Details as follows:

- 1 Longitudinal extension: 72.87'94"97E (Head/bridge over canal on Khanuwali road) to 72.89'60"04E (eastern end of Keshav colony) or 72.90'66"04E (up to Ricco water works end).
- 2 Latitudinal extension: from 28.83'2588N (Ranjeet Singh's sawmill) to 28.85'24"92N (near Mj college) or 28.85'86"38N (including new northern colonies).

Area: Rawla Mandi Town measures 2.231 km (from Mj college to Ranjeet Singh sawmill) or 2.975 km (from Northern colonies to Ranjeet Singh sawmill) from north to south and 1.83 km (from bridge to Keshav colony eastern end) or 2.655 km (from bridge to Ricco water works) from east to west. Area of Rawla town without Ricco is approximately 2.950 km^{2} and with Ricco it is 4 km^{2} and Rawla gram panchayat covers approximately 9.60 km^{2}. Perimeter is 9, 10 and 15.27 km respectively.

=== Minerals ===
Gypsum is most common mineral found in the rocks of this area. The gypsum deposits occur in rocks of tertiary period(roughly from 6.6 crore to 25.8 lakhs years old period), and are considered to have by evaporation process.

== Governance ==
Rawla Mandi is currently a tehsil local government. Rawla mandi is divided into 17 wards.

The current sarpanch is Gangabishan Poonia. Manju Devi is serving as vice-sarpanch who is also ward panch from ward no.15. Total ward members are listed below:

Ward No.	Name of ward panch
1	Suman
2	Jaswant Singh Raisikh
3	Surajbhan Nayak
4	Krishna Kataria
5	Kavita
6	Vikram Singh Ramgarhia
7	Bhaga Devi
8	Hetram Bishnoi
9	Simranpreet Kaur
10	Gaurav Kumar Arora
11	Manpreet Kaur
12	Darshan Singh
13	Dhanraj Meghwal
14	Rajkumar Sansi
15	Manju Devi Jain
16	Chandra Devi Sain
17	Santosh Joshi

=== Chaks of Rawla mandi ===
[[

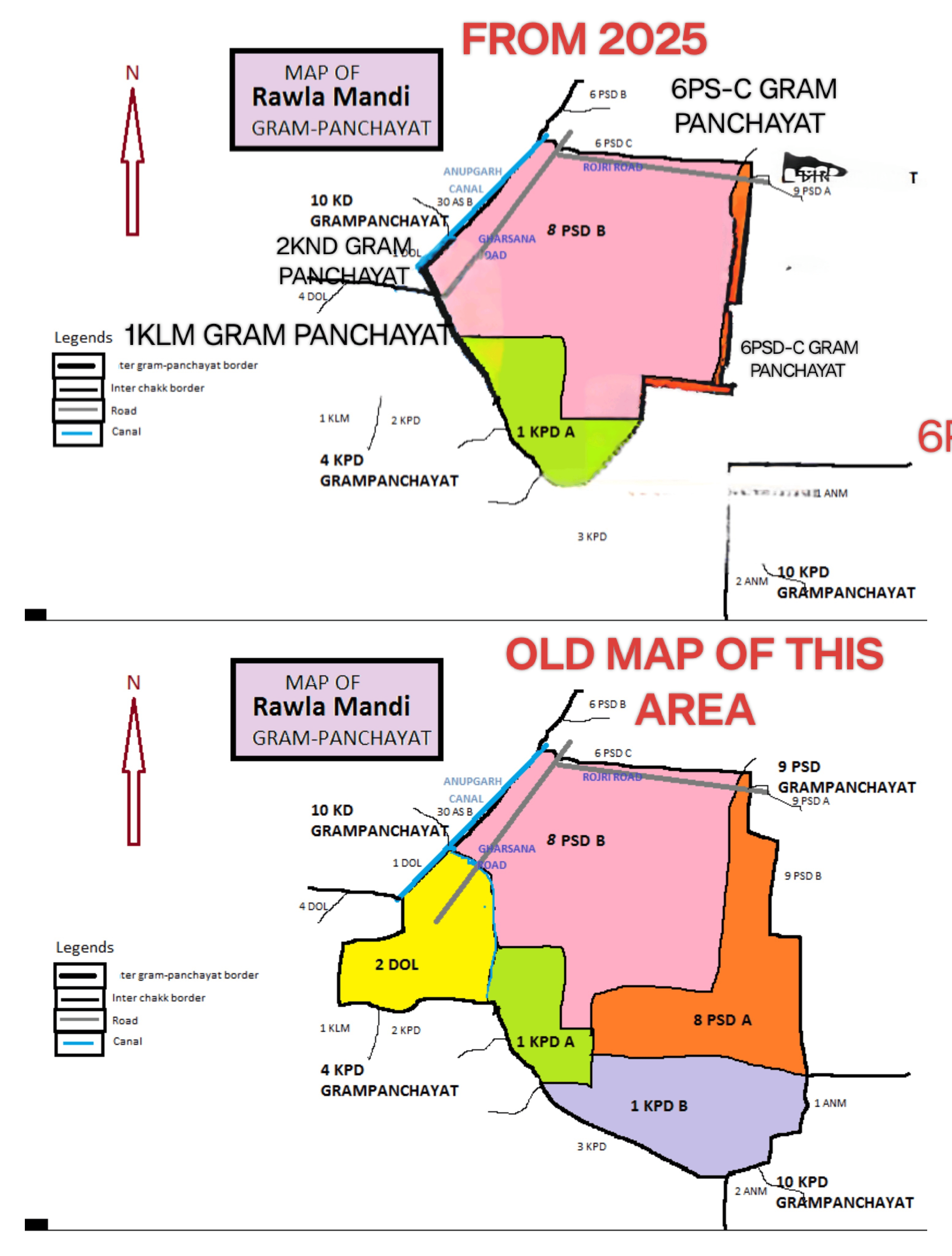
Rawla mandi chaks after REORGANISATION

|thumbnail|right|Map showing 5 Chaks of Rawla Mandi.]]

Rawla Mandi grampanchayat is divided into 2 chaks. These are 8 PSD B 1KPD A .Main town of Rawla Mandi is associated with 8 PSD B. Rawla Mandi grampanchayat is known as 8 PSD B. 10 KD,2KND,1KLM,6PSD-C, 4KPD are neighbouring grampanchayats of Rawla Mandi grampanchayat.

== History ==
=== Timeline ===
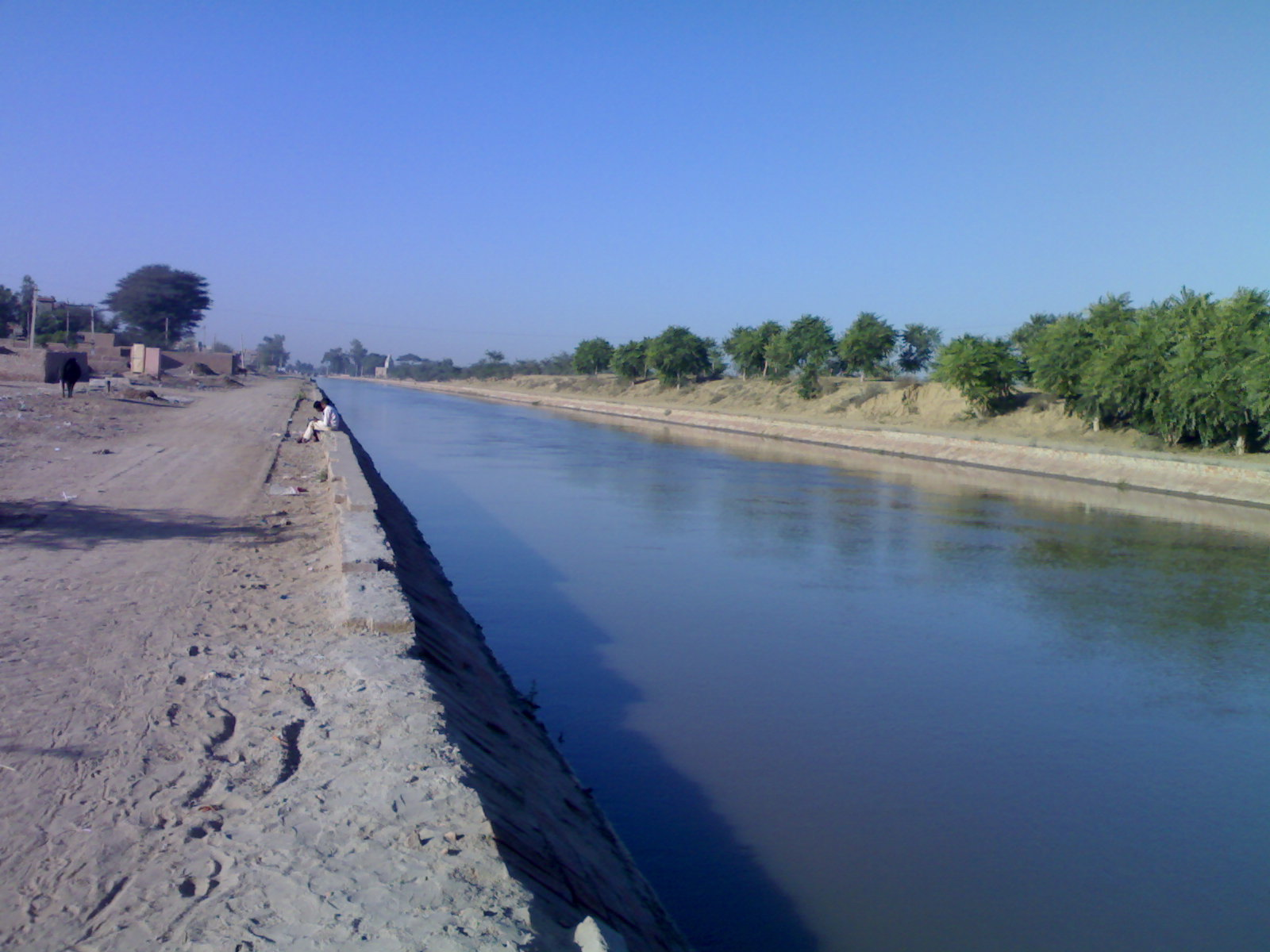
Anupgarh branch of IGNP canal: the history of Rawla begins with this canal.

Rawla is not an old village. The Anoopgarh branch of the IGNP canal brought the waters of the Satluj and Beas rivers in 1967 and at that time some people opened their shops near the bridge built on the canal for labourers and farmers working on the canal site.The State Bank of India opened its branch on 7 May 1981. In 1982 a new grain market was established. Rawla began to expand and the golden period of Rawla began. On 19 August 1987, a number of illegal shops were demolished by the administration and people showed strong resistance. Earlier Rawla Mandi was a part of Rojari gram panchayat and in 1988 it was given grampanchayat status. Gangabishan Poonia was elected as first Sarpanch on 1 June 1988. Hardworking and dedication changed the life of the people of Rawla.

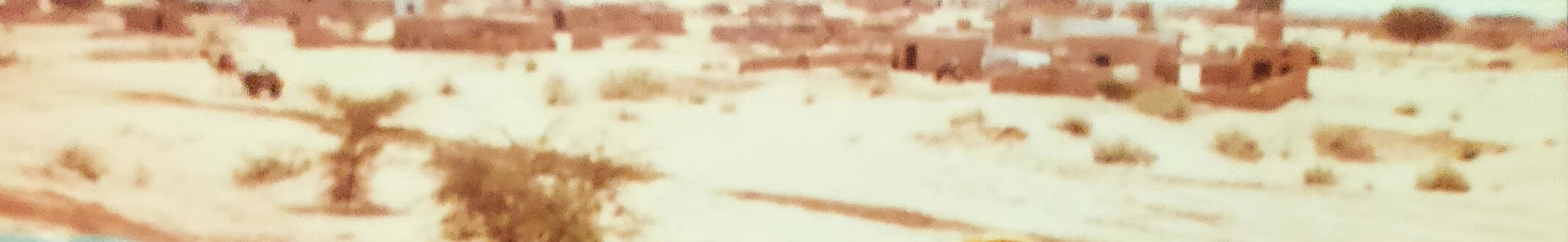
This photo shows Rawla Mandi with mud houses in 1997 and area s behind police station.The photo was taken from room where now mobile tower( near Naseeb school) is located

By 2000 Rawla began to decline due to droughts and lack of water in the canal. Many residents left the town and the people became hopeless and sad. The people of Anoopgarh, Gharsana, Khajuwala and Rawla Mandi started a movement against state government. The people of Rawla were demanding sufficient water for agriculture. According to them government had discriminatory attitude between people of first phase and second phase of Ignp irrigation system but government was claiming due to bad rain conditions water supply in Ignp canal had decreased and water was being given as per proportion of both phases. Rawla came into the news when this peasant movement became violent when a gathering of farmers entered a police station and set it afire on 27 October 2004. Three persons Kaluram, Mangilal, and Rajkumar died in police firing. A curfew was imposed on the area.

The shortage of water for agriculture is a challenge for the people of Rawla Mandi. Following rainfall and the restoration of the canal's water supply, agricultural activity in the area has resumed.

Road divider and road lights were introduced in 2011. 2012:- Rawla Mandi Sub-Tehsil is set up and Rawla mandi will be the headquarters of this sub-tehsil. In 2013 area east to Rojari road (for example ward no. 11 etc.) given back to 9 psd a grampanchayat. Many years ago it was added to 8 psd b grampanchayat. 2016:- Action against encroachment in land along canal began by government administration on 25 January in its first phase from bridge on Khanuwali road, but it razed 2 or 3 small buildings built within 25 feet of canal boundary. April:-The CCTV cameras mounted on road light poles at Rojari chowk and Shiv chowk. The cameras have been fixed first in Rawla Mandi at public places. 2024 Sep 2024 Rajasthan state level school girls Kabaddi tournament was organised, where people of the town contributed and showed warmth hospitality towards guests.The schools, Gurudwara Singh Sabha, Jambheshwar Temple samiti, Anand hotel made food and breakfast arrangements.

=== List of Sarpanches of Rawla Mandi ===
No.	Name Sarpanch'	Tenure
1	Gangabishan Poonia	1 June 1988 – 19 July 1991 (Note: Malchand Sharma remained as Prashasak(administrator) from 19 July 1991 to 31 Jan. 1995)
2	Rajeram Tak	1 Feb. 1995 – 31 Jan 2000
3	Chanderkala Poonia	1 Feb 2000 – 31 Jan 2005
4	Jani Devi	1 Feb. 2005–21 Jan.2010
5	Sirjeet Baroka	from 23 Jan. 2010 – 18 Jan. 2015
6	Sunita Nayak	from 18 Jan.2015-15 March 2020
7	Gangabishan Poonia	from 15 March 2020-incumbent

=== The question of wards of 10 and 11 ===
According to map Rawla mandi or grampanchayat 8 PSD-B consists 5 Chaks or land pieces.ward no 11 and 10 are not parts of these chaks. These wards are on chak 6 PSD C, which is a part of grampanchayat 9 PSD A. It consists 56 Bighas land. In 1996 deliberately or by mistake this 56 bighas land as ward no.10 and 11 were incorporated into Rawla Mandi. Almost after 10 years Gram panchayat 9 PSD-A demanded back these areas on the basis of fact that these were originally inhabited on the land of grampanchayat 9 PSA-A. However this matter in now in court. On Aug-Sept 2013 both sarpanches of Rawla mandi and 9 PSD-A with their supporters kept dharna before police station with different hues of problem of these wards.Rawla mandi sarpanch was demanding not to commence any action in these wards, where as sarpanch of 9 PSD-A stated that he has full right to start action against encroachment and issues pattas in these parts. After written assurance of BDO to demands of Rawla sarpanch dharna was put to end by Rawla mandi sarpanch. On 12 September 2013 by a letter by Panchayat Raj department of Rajasthan government it was made clear that land concerning wards 10 and 11 was under administration of gram panchayat 9 PSD-A and 9 PSD A grampanchayat was free to initiate any action against encroachment and issue pattas in these wards.

=== During Corona pandemic ===
The COVID-19 spread in Rawla is part of the worldwide pandemic of coronavirus disease 2019 (COVID-19) caused by severe acute respiratory syndrome coronavirus 2 (SARS-CoV-2). The first case of COVID-19 in Rawla a Government Hospital employee, was reported on 3 September 2020.(after 7 months and 4 days of first case reported in India.) On 22 March, Rawla observed a 14-hour voluntary public curfew at the instance of Prime Minister Narendra Modi. It was followed by mandatory lockdowns like other parts of India.

== Economy ==
People are mainly dependent on agriculture-based trades.

=== Industries ===
As far as industries is concerned gypsum grinding factories occupy the most important place. Raw gypsum material is supplied from villages. The government central processing unit is the perhaps largest unit in the Asian continent. After grinding, gypsum is transported to other northern Indian cities where gypsum based large scale industries use it as raw material. There was a time when Rawla area was known for its high yield of cotton. A number of factories for processing cotton were shut down in recent decade. The industrial area or Riico is located in easternmost part of Rawla Mandi. Various markets work to fulfill needs of people of town and surrounding villages.

== Demographics ==
Population as per 2011 census is as below.

CHAK or revenue village	Male	Female	Total
8 PSD A	68	63	131
8 PSD B	6,225	5,450	11,675
2 DOL	244	201	445
1 KPD A	101	96	197
1 KPD B	267	232	499
Total	6905	6042	12947

== According to census 2001 ==
Total population was 13712 according to census of 2001. Among these 7315 are males and 6397 was female population, and mean sex ratio was 874.

== Culture ==
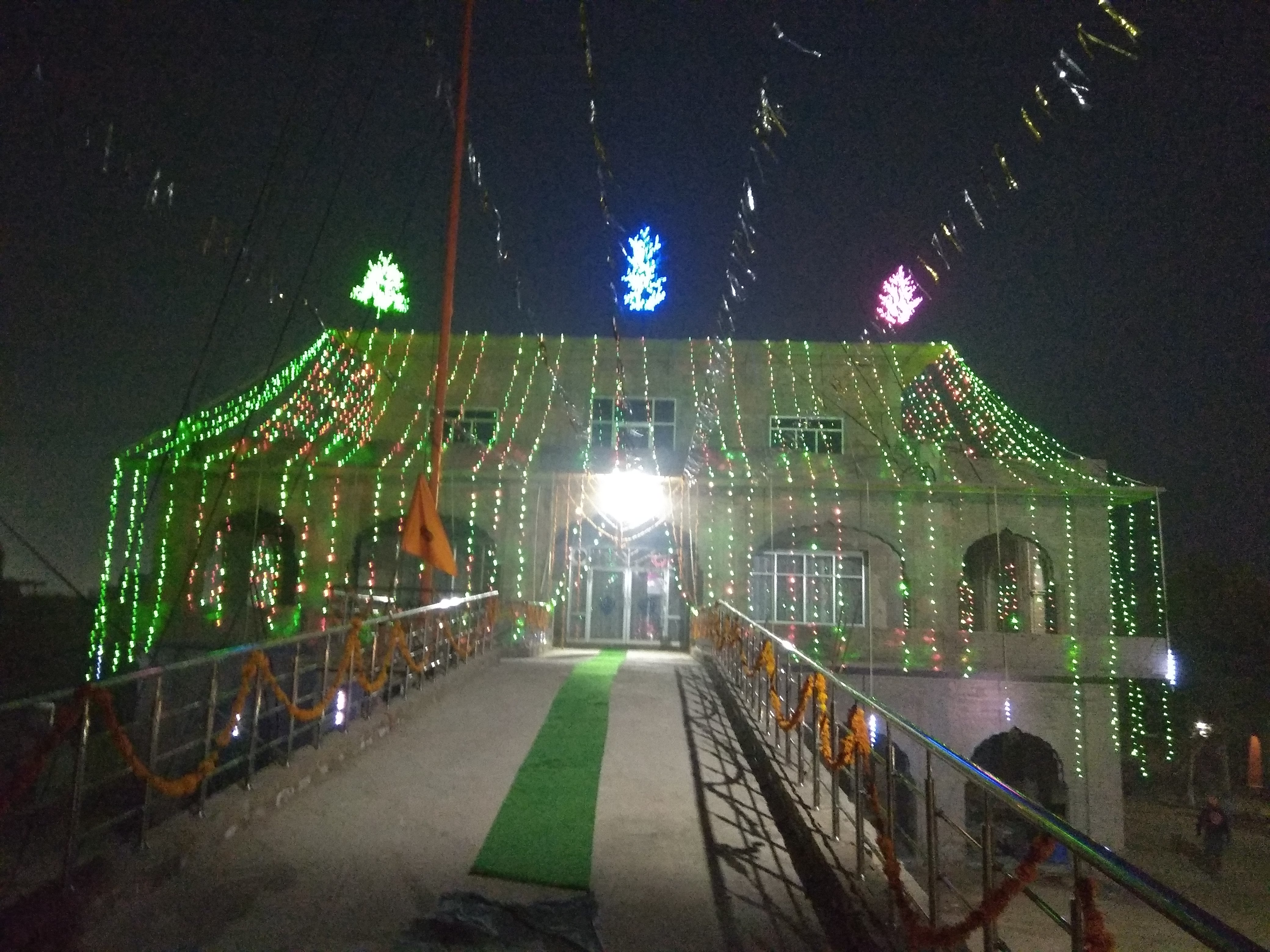
Gurudwara Singh Sabha on the time of Guru poorab celebtations

Bagri, Punjabi, Hindi, Sindhi and Marwari languages are spoken here. People practice Hindu and Sikh religions. Some people have faith in Islam also. The Dera culture is also present here. Many people follow Radha Swami, Sacha Sauda and Nirankari Mission Deras.

== Transport to other cities and villages ==
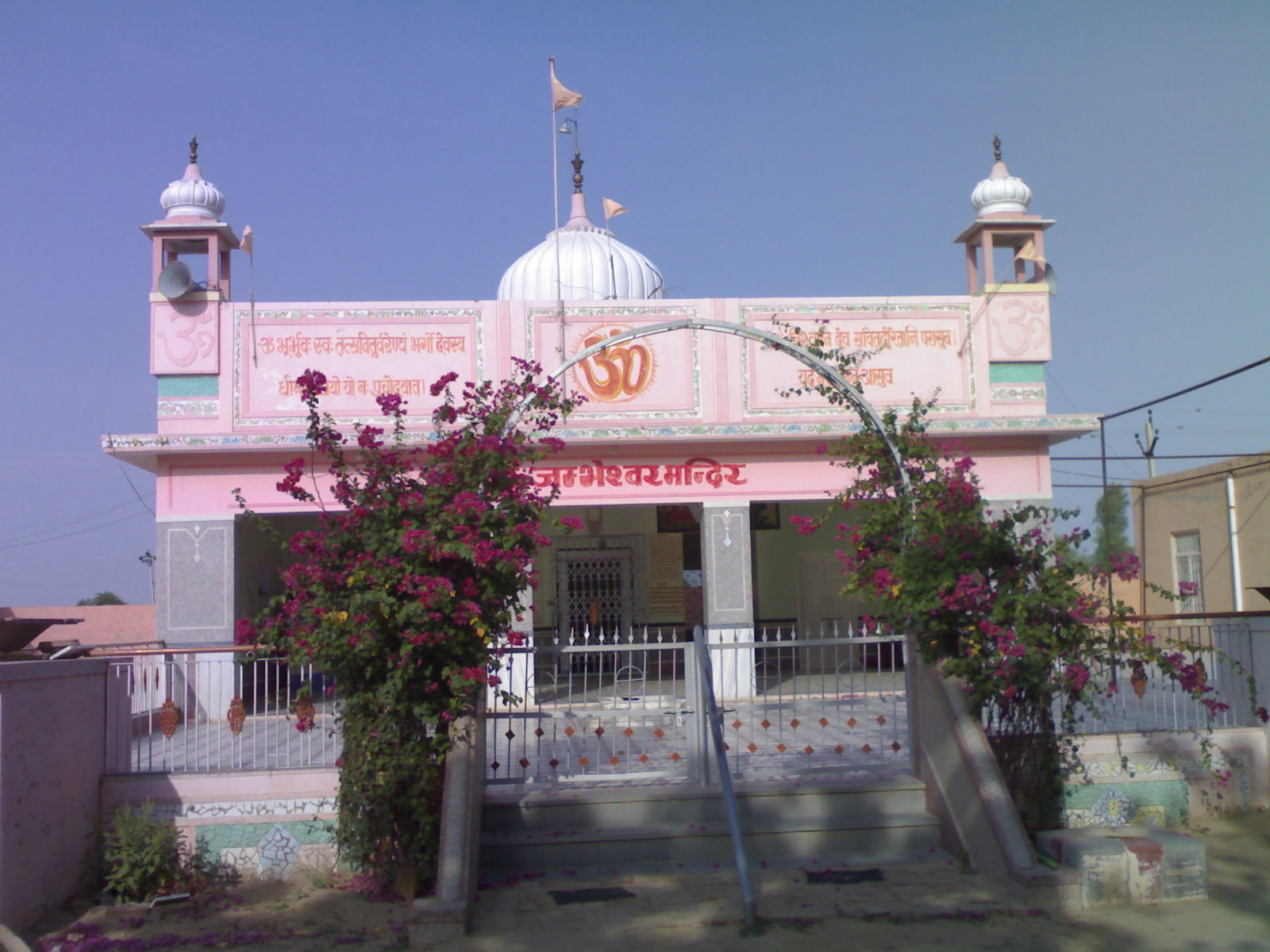
Bishnoi Temple at Rawla Mandi.

Rajasthan roadway buses are only public means of transport in Rawla Mandi. Private bus services are other option of transport to other cities and villages. Private taxis are also available to move to nearby villages.

=== Main roads from Rawla Mandi to other cities and villages ===
Rawla mandi khanuwali road market

Dandi road, Keshav colony

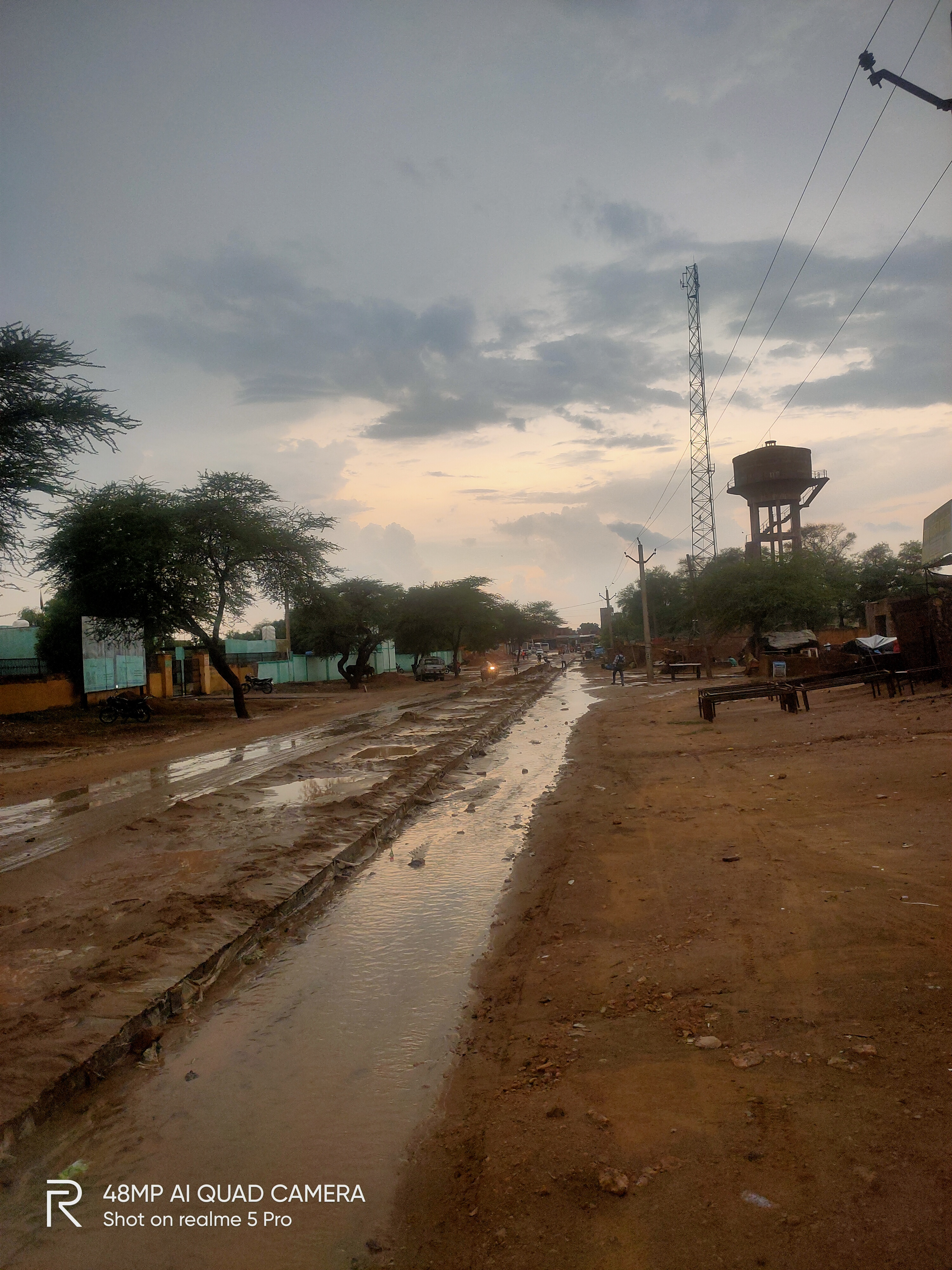
Rawla Rojhari road constructed in 2024 .This photo is taken at Rawla Mandi in rainy season of August 2024.

1. MDR 103 (Gharsana-Khajuwala road): This road connects to 281 Head, 12 Mld, Gharsana on the north and Shekhra, Khajuwala on the south-west.
2. 365 head or KND road: This emerges in west side of Rawla and helps to reach 7 KND, Khanuwali and then 365 head.
3. Sakhi road: This road emerges from above mentioned KND road and connects with Rawla village, Sakhi and then Gharsana.
4. Dandi road: This road begins from Keshav colony and connects with KPD villages, Dandi, Sattasar and then Bikaner.
5. Rojri road: This road emerges on the east part of Rawla Mandi and used to transport to Bikaner. It connects to Rojri where it gets merged with Gharsana-Bikaner road.
6. Dol road: On the western end of Rawla this road helps to reach 7 DOL.

== Sports ==
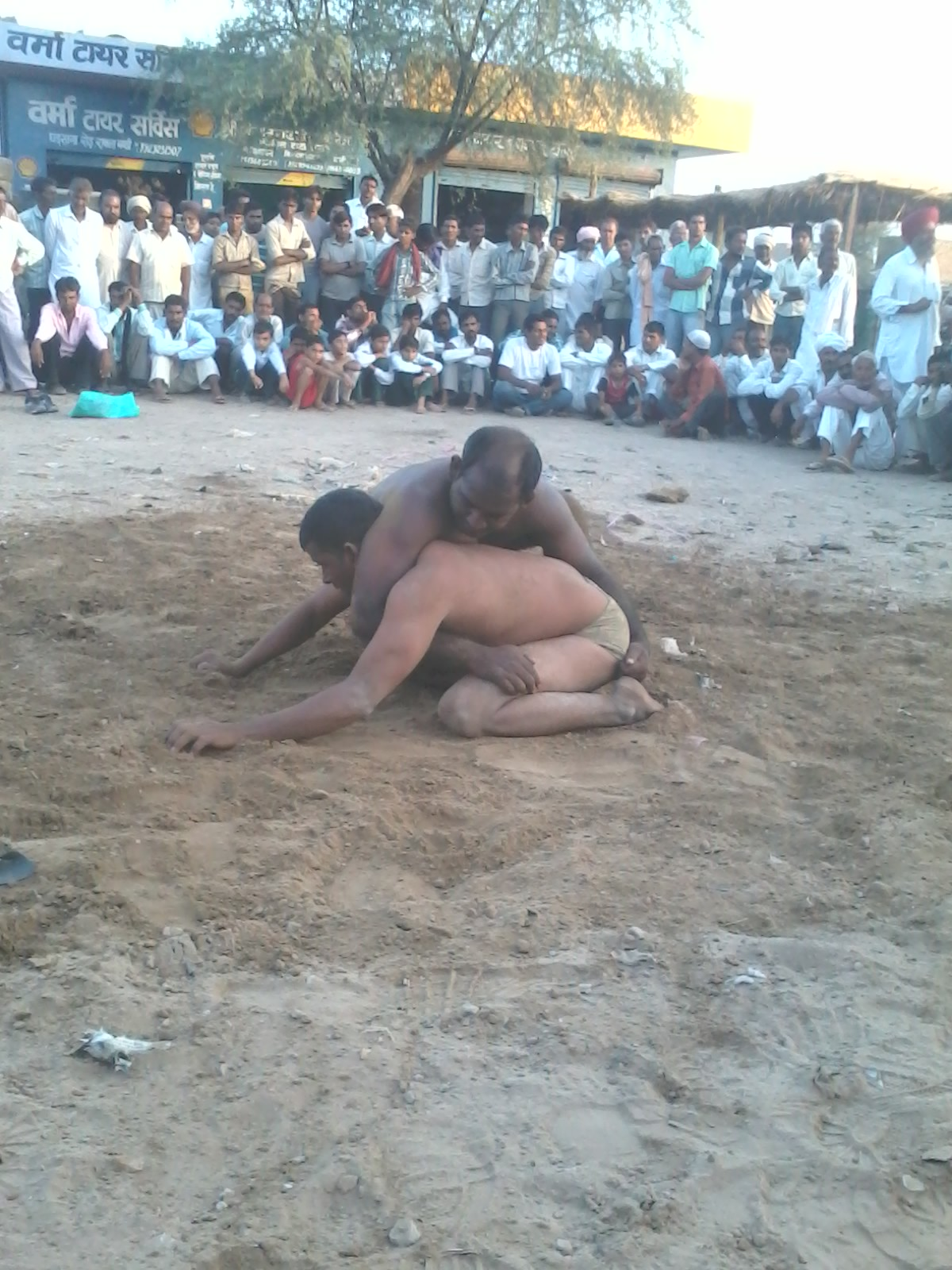
A scene from a match of Indian rural wrestling, photo taken near Rojhri Chowk

1. Cricket is popular among youth. Devabai smriti cup cricket tournament was first tournament in Rawla Mandi held in 1992. Final was played between Bikaner team and Deengarh team and Bikaner won. In first tournament of Rawla Mandi, Mr. Chandu declared 2rs. for each four.
2. Indian wrestling and badminton as well as other games are played in Rawla Mandi.
3. National Cycle Polo Tournament 2012:

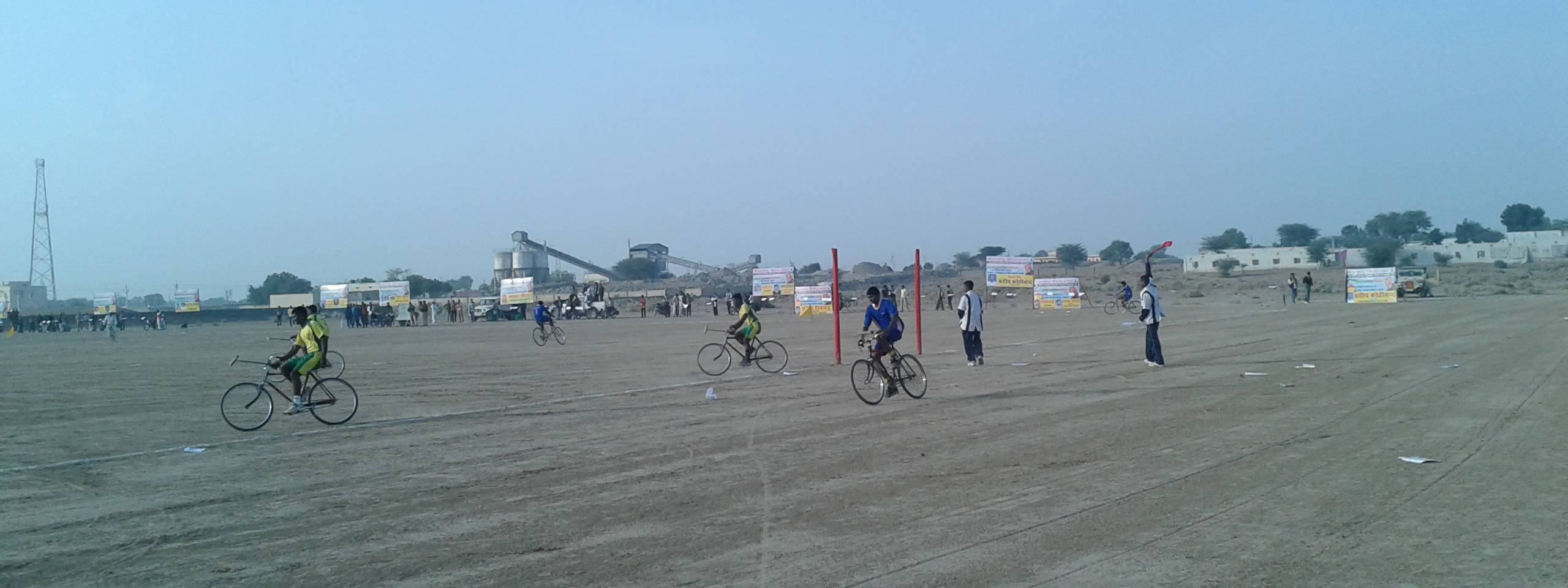
A scene from a cycle polo match held on 16 Dec. 2012 in Rawla Mandi, in the background is the Gypsum Grinding plant

It was held in Gharsana and Rawla Mandi in December 2012.

== Government buildings and facilities ==
The government runs the local schools, a community health care centre, veterinary hospital, and the Office of Forest Department. The police station services the southern half region of Gharsana tehsil in addition to the town.Two branches of the State Bank of India (SBI), Oriental Bank of Commerce (OBC) and the Ganganagar Cooperative Bank also operate here. ATM facilities are available at the SBI and OBC banks. Rawla mandi has a Sub office level post office under Ganganagar Head office with (earlier Rawla was a branch office under Gharsana sub office).This office has following branch offices 10 KD,12KND,13DOL,22RKD,4KPD,7KND, Khobar, and 2 Kld.

SN	Bank name	Branch code	IFSC code	MICR code
1	Sbi Rawla Mandi	007393	SBIN0007393	335002008
2	Sbi Rawla Mandi(erstwhile Sbbj branch)	032393	SBIN0032393	335003525
3	Punjab National Bank(erstwhile Obc bank) Rawla Mandi	100525	PUNB0052510	Example
4	The Ganganagar Co-operative	033026	RSCB0033026	335830218

== Anupgarh branch of Ignp canal ==
Anupgarh canal is the region's main water source. This forms the northwestern border of the town and at R.D.321 a bridge cum head is built, where KND and KPD two distributories gets water from canal. This canal is lined by bricks. Few years ago a Khadwanja (a brick road) is made on both banks of the canal. In the town side valuable land along the canal has been occupied by various people and they have built pacca houses. People also using banks to dump garbage and litter. For many people banks are used for morning walk and jogging.

== Social organisations ==
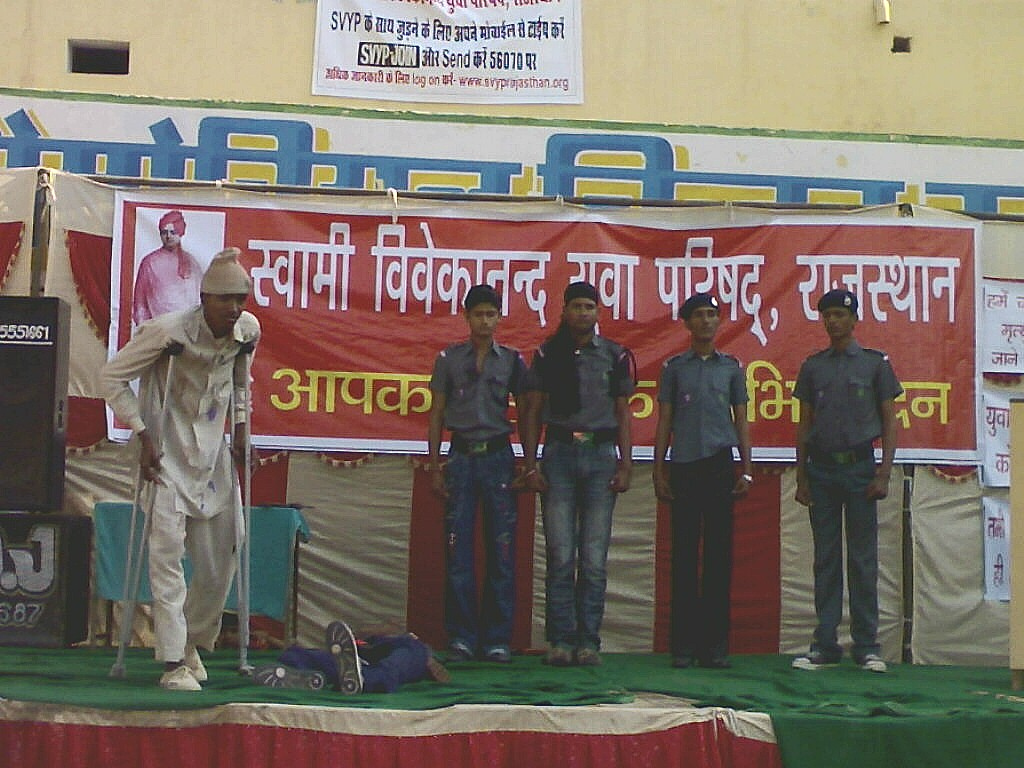
A patriotic cultural programme organised by a social organisation

Many social organisations are actively contributing in social life of town.

- Bharat vikas parishad is an active social service and programmes like marriage of poor girls, eye operation camps etc. are conducted by the organisation.
- The local branch of Swami Vivekanand Yuwa Parishad has recently emerged and active for social awakening against social evils like drugs, dowry etc. This organisations organises cultural programmes to spread values like patriotism, nation-service specially among youths.
- Simant yuwa jagruk sansthan is also an active social organisation in Rawla Mandi.
- Samarpan Sansthan Rawla is another important organisation works for students and conducts general knowledge competitions.
- Grabhasth Sishu Samrakshan Samiti (in English – The committee for fetal protection in womb) is an organisation which makes aware people against evil of female foeticide. This organisation encourages celebration on girl child-birth. The members of this organisation distributes sweets on birth of female child.

== Fauna (animals) ==
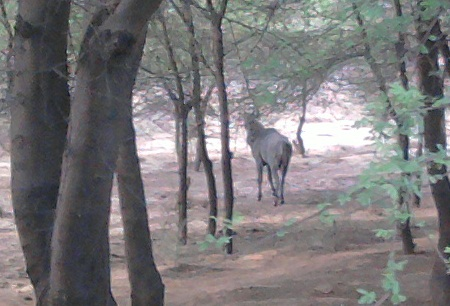
A Rojh (Neelgai) near Rawla Mandi

The waters of canals has changed both flora and fauna of this area. Apart from domestic and common animals Rawla area has also some wild animals. Rojh or Neelgai (Boselaphus tragocamelus) are common mammals found in farms and sandy dunes. Farmers have to care about their crops from these animals. Sometimes Neelgai comes on roads and becomes reason of accidents. The snakes, Goh, Sanha(Sanda), wild rats etc. are other wild animals of this area.

== Education ==
=== Colleges ===
- Satyam Institute for Management Technology & Science.
- J.B. Degree College-
- Indira memorial nursing center for A.N.M./G.N.M.
- Sri Swami Vivekanad Co-Education College Rawla Mandi BA & B.SC. (MEDICAL/NON MEDICAL)

=== Schools ===
(A) Senior Secondary schools:-

- Indira Memorial Children Sr.Sec.School [arts & agri./Medical /non-medical]
- Shri J.B. Model Senior Secondary school [arts & agri./Medical/non-medical]
- Adrash vidhya niketan school [arts ]
- Swami Vivekanand Children Academy Sr. Sec. School [ Arts, Commerce & Science(Agriculture/Medical/Non-Medical ], Gharsana Road, Near Ridhi-Sidhi Colony, Rawla Mandi
- Govt. senior secondary school
- Adrash Vidya Niketan Senior Sec. School Rawla Mandi
- B R public sr.sec. SCHOOL rawla mandi
- Chaudhray Kashiram Senior Secondary School (dandi road)

(B) Secondary schools:-

- Chankya public school
- RR public school
- Shaheed Bhagat Singh public school
- Saint Montessori school

(C) Middle and Primary schools:

-

- Adarsh Vidya Mandir UPS School, Near jb school, Happy Colony, Rawla Mandi
- Govt middle school, ward no.5
- Govt middle school, ward no.11
- Shree Mata Hansa Devi Girls' School
- Tagore public school
- M.R. public school
- shri krishna vidya mandir u.p. school ward 6.keshav colony Rawla mandi
- Govt primary school, near Shiwa temple, Rawla Mandi.ward 17.
- Govt primary school, Keshav Colony, 8PSD(B)
- Govt Middle Sanskrit School 1Kpd(B)
- Govt primary school, 8 PSD 'A'
- Govt primary school, 2DOL
- Govt primary school, 1KPD(A)

(D) English medium schools:-

- SV Children academy
- Shivam International School
- Naseeb Parvarish Public School
- Indira memorial children school
- J B modal public school
- Mahatma Gandhi English Medium School

=== Computer Education Institutes ===
- Munda Computer Edu Care, Ward No. 12, Nearby Rojari Chowk ---- "An ISO 9001:2015 Certified Institution"
- Shivam Institute of Education, Ward No. 12
- Gurunanak Computer Center, Main Market
- SHRI BALAJI EMITRA SERVICE, RAWLA MANDI
- SH. J.B. Education Hub, ward no. 15 Rawla Mandi

=== Ambedker reading room and library ===
The Ambedker reading room and library was established on 26 February 2017.

naresh kumar nayak dpk news 9549380002

== Miscellaneous ==
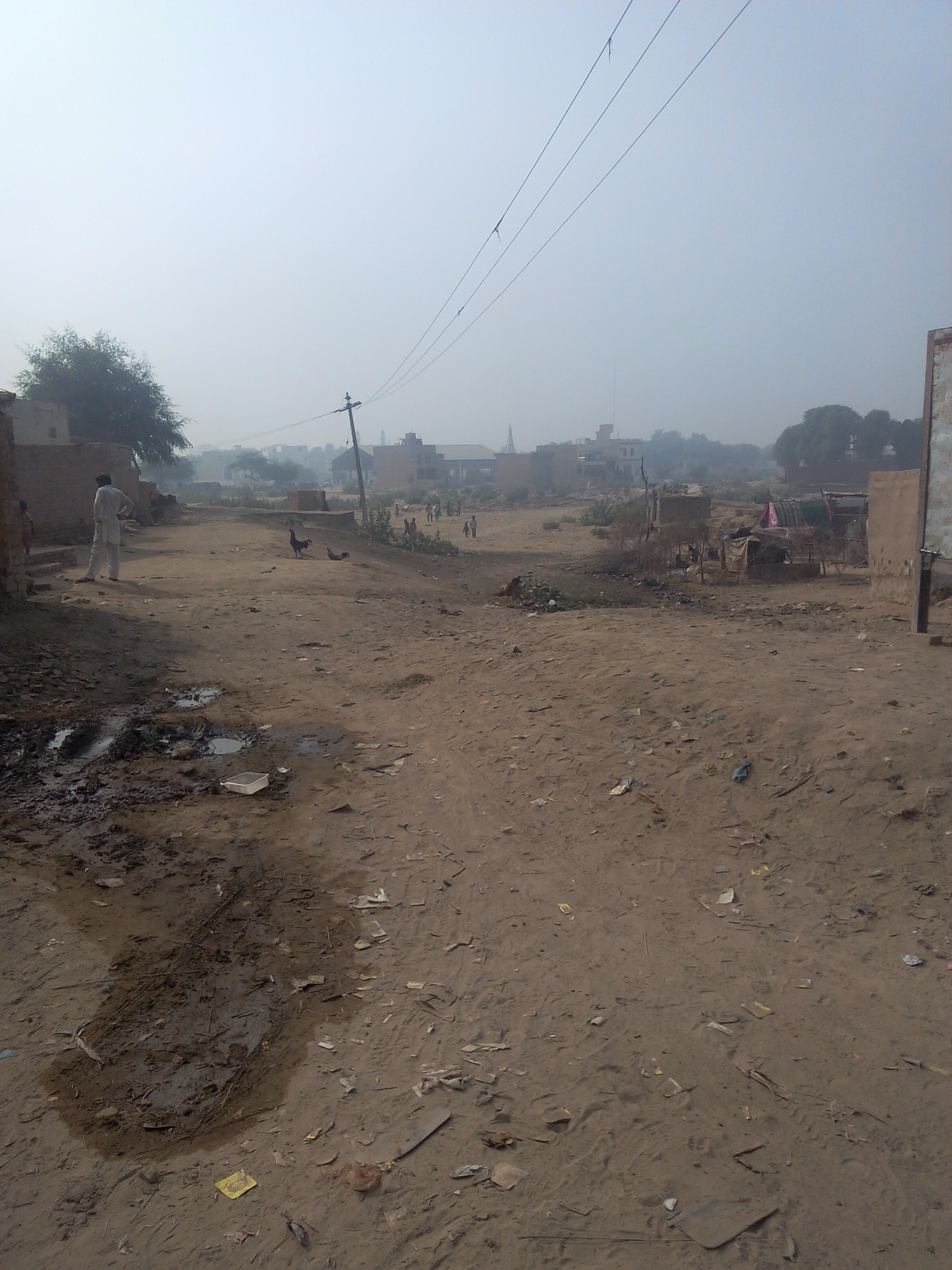
Rawla Mandi slums showing the developed area in the distance

Rawla Mandi has various political and governance issues. People have to travel about 180 km for their works at district level. The demand for Sub-tehsil at Rawla Mandi has been raised many times because tehsil headquarters Gharsana is 30 km from Rawla Mandi. Rawla Mandi govt. Sen sec school is facing problem of lacking of staff and student after tenth have to opt only arts subjects.

== Gallery ==
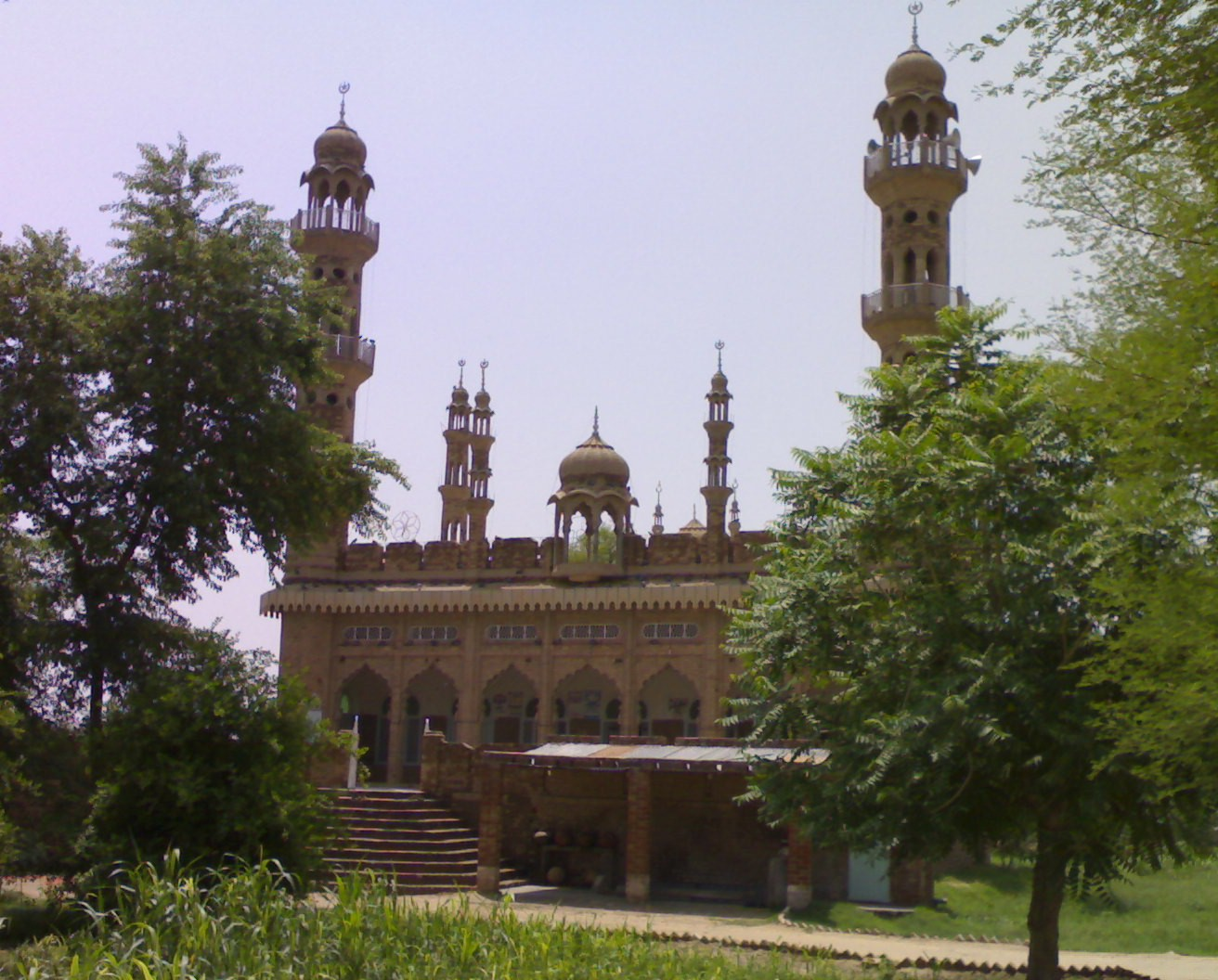
The Mosque at Rawla Mandi

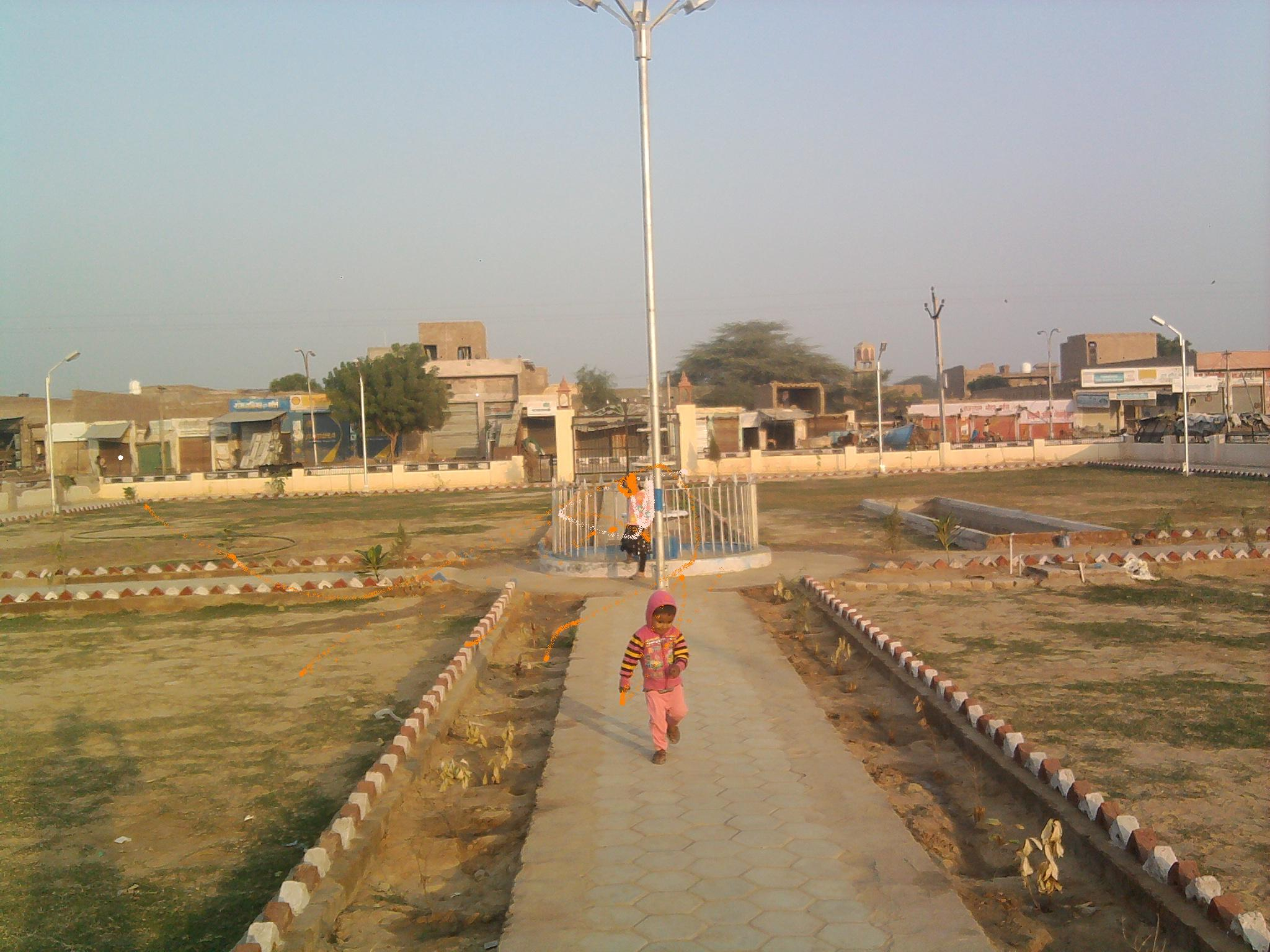
Ambedkar Park was built and opened for public in 2013.

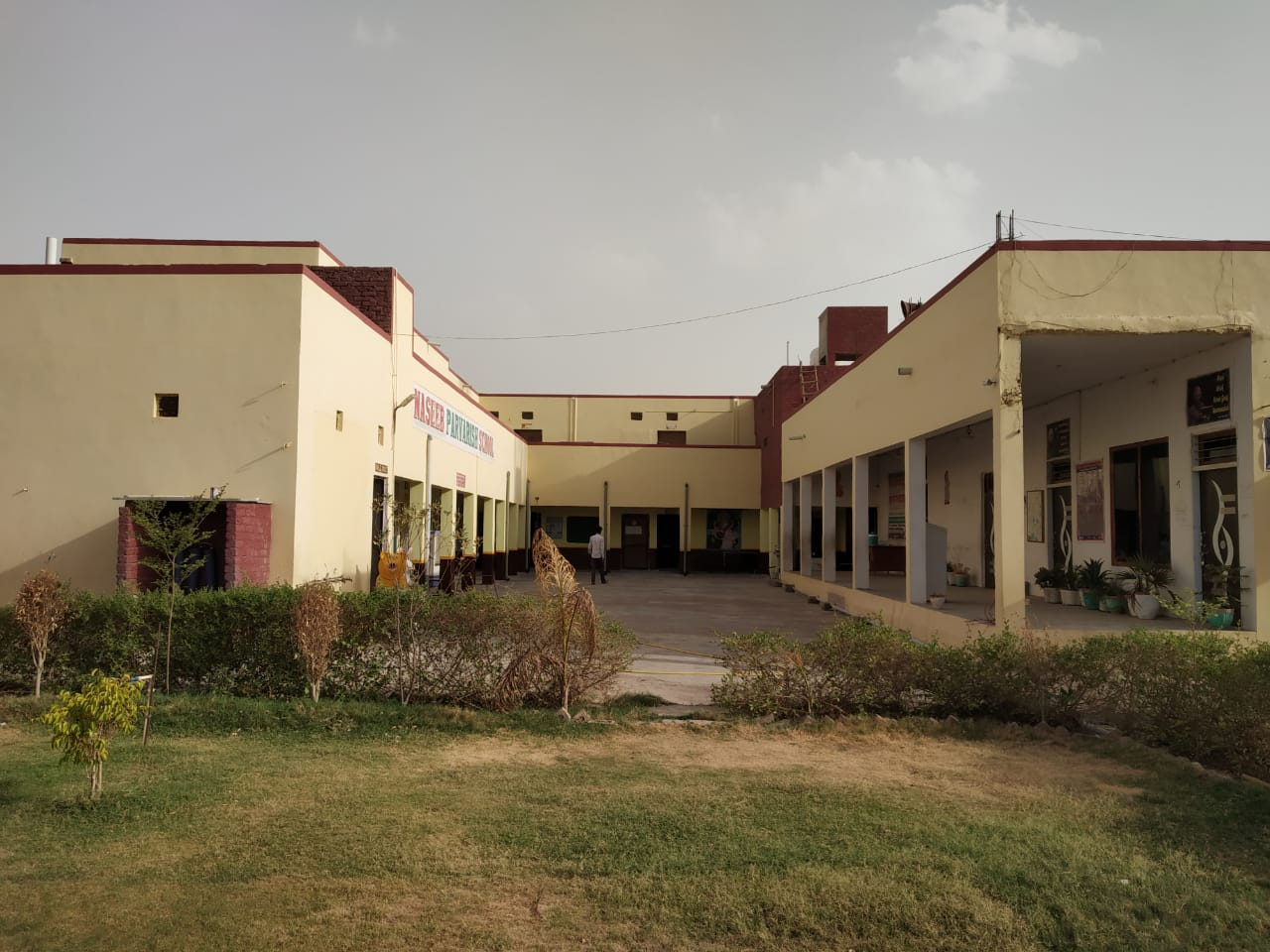
Naseeb Parvarish School

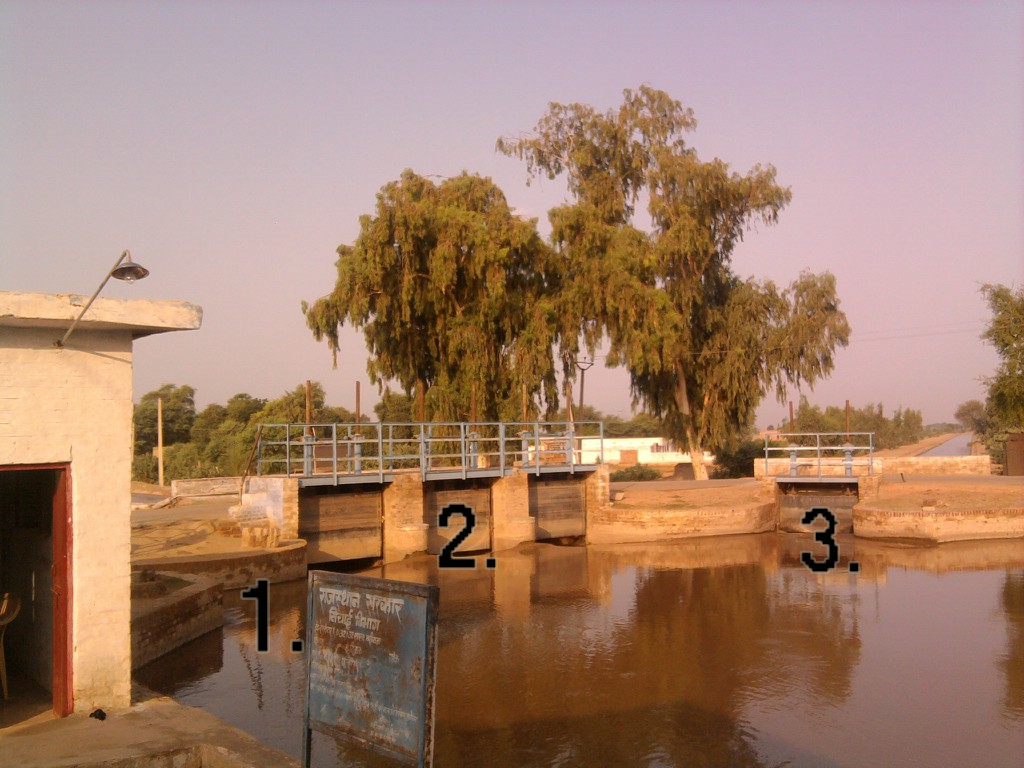
Rawla Mandi bridge or Head (R.D. 321) and its water gates 1) Water gates to KPD distributary. 2) Main gates. 3) Water gates to KND distributary
