= 10 DOL =

Gram Panchayat in Rajasthan, India

Coordinates: 28°49′02″N 72°45′55″E

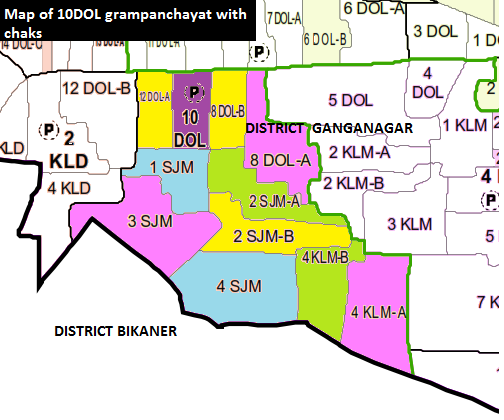
Map of 10 DOL Gram Panchayat

10 DOL is a gram panchayat in the Rawla Mandi tehsil of the Anupgarh district of Rajasthan, India. It is located in south west of Rawla tehsil. 10 Dol Gram Panchayat is a Rural Local Body in Gharsana Panchayat Samiti part of Ganganagar Zila Parishad. There are total 11 Villages under 10 Dol Gram Panchayat jurisdiction.Gram Panchayat Gharsana is further divided into 9 Wards. Gram Panchayat Gharsana has total 9 elected members by people. Gram Panchayat Gharsana has total 9 schools. Gharsana Gram Panchayat has total 8 full time government employees.

The distance between 10 DOL and Rawla Mandi (tehsil) is10 km and from 365 head ( sub tehsil) is 5 km . In this village five kiryana shops, floor mil, barber Shop and CSC centre also.
