= Gharsana tehsil =

Town in Rajasthan, India

Gharsana Tehsil is a tehsil located in the south of the Sri Ganganagar district of Rajasthan, India. It is bordered by Anupgarh tehsil in the north, by Chhatargarh, Rawla Mandi tehsil, in the southeast. The western border touches Fort Abbas Tehsil of Bahawalnagar district of Pakistani Punjab.

As per the 2011 Gharsana census, population is 26,830.

== Demography ==
In the census of 2011 the population of Gharsana was 26,830.

Major villages are:

- Gharsana (3STR & 24 AS-c)
- 365 Head is a sub-tehsil
