= Fort Abbas Tehsil =

Fort Abbas Tehsil تحصِيل فورٹ عباس
- Tehsil
- Location of Fort Abbas Tehsil in Punjab, Pakistan
- Country: Pakistan
- Region: (Punjab, Pakistan) Punjab
- District: Bahawalnagar
- Headquarters: Fort Abbas

Area
  - Tehsil: 2,536 km^{2} (979 sq mi)

Population (2023)
  - Tehsil: 510,253
  - Density: 201.2/km^{2} (521.1/sq mi)
  - Urban: 134,065 (26.27%)
  - Rural: 376,188 (73.73%)
- Time zone: UTC+5 (PST)

Fort Abbas (Urdu: تحصِيل فورٹ عباس) is a tehsil located in Bahawalnagar District, Punjab, Pakistan.

== History ==
The area currently encompassed by Fort Abbas Tehsil was a thriving center of ancient Hakra civilization. A survey of the Cholistan region from 1947 to 1977 dated Hakra ceramics to 5000 BCE.

== Geography ==
Fort Abbas Tehsil has an area of 2,536 km^{2}.

=== Adjacent tehsils ===
- Yazman Tehsil, Bahawalpur District (west)
- Haroonabad Tehsil (northeast)
- Anupgarh, Gharsana, and Khajuwala Tehsils of India in the northeast, southeast and southwest, respectively

== Demographics ==
=== Population ===
Historical population
Year	Pop.	±% p.a.
1951	64,749	—
1961	102,362	+4.69%
1972	136,060	+2.62%
1981	195,476	+4.11%
1998	285,596	+2.26%
2017	422,768	+2.09%
2023	510,253	+3.18%

As of the 2023 census, Fort Abbas Tehsil had a population of 510,253. According to the 2017 Census of Pakistan, there were 422,768 people living in Fort Abbas Tehsil in 67,121 households. Its population in 1998 was 285,596.
