= Anupgarh canal =

Canal in Rajasthan, India

Coordinates: 28.841°N 72.869°E

Anupgarh canal is the canal which irrigates agriculture land in the south part of Shri Ganganagar district and north west of Bikaner district of western India.

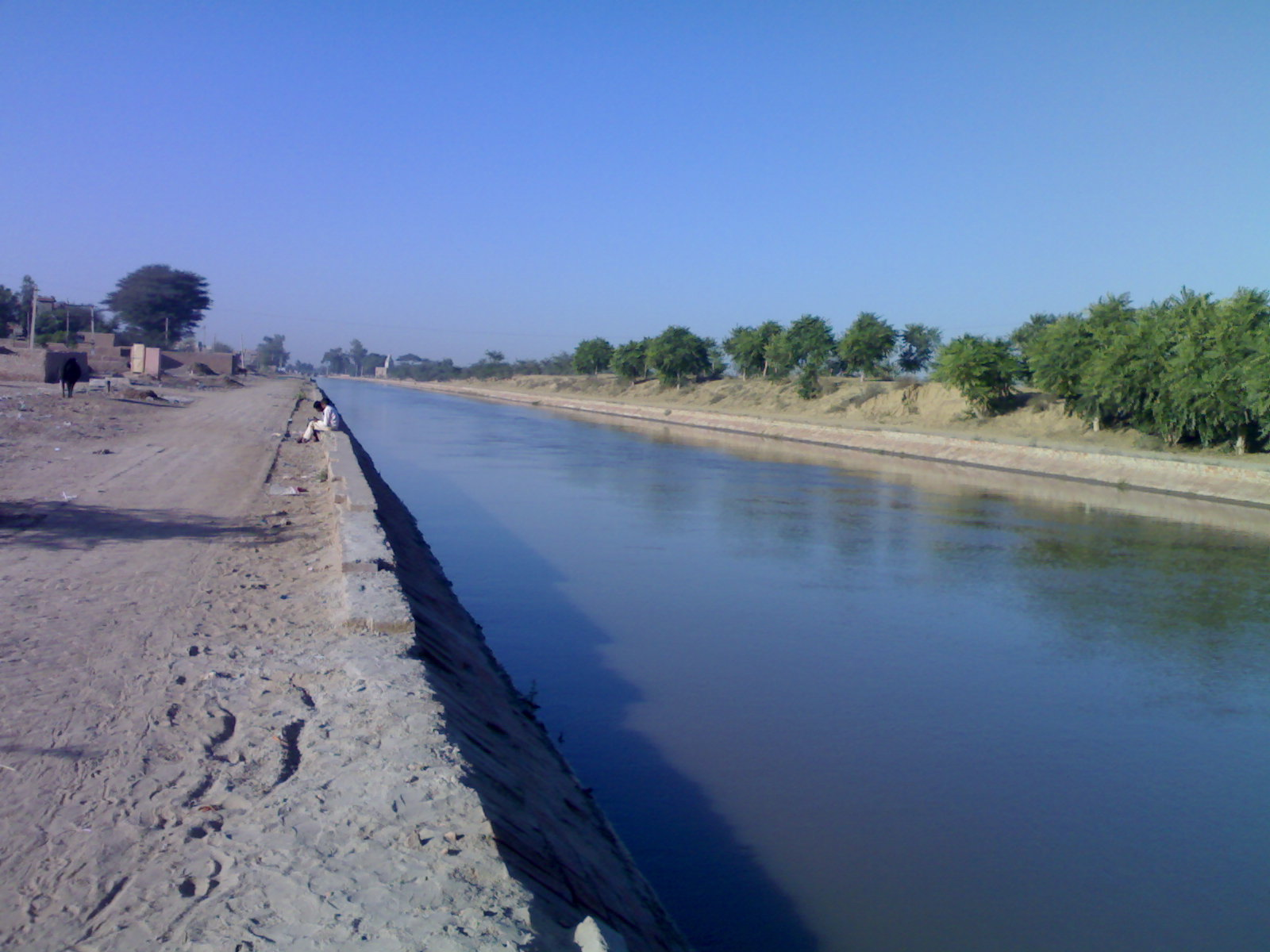
Anupgarh canal in Rawla Mandi

It is the main source of drinking water in this area.

== Origination ==
It originates near Suratgarh from Indira Gandhi Canal.

== Irrigation ==
It irrigates agriculture lands of Suratgarh tehsil, Vijaynagar tehsil, Anupgarh tehsil, Ghrsana tehsil and Khajuwala tehsil, and other land.
