= 365 Head =

365 Head/RD 11Dol 2 Kld
- Interactive map of 365 Head/RD
- Coordinates: 28.833133°N 72.751293°E
- Country: India
- State: Rajasthan
- District: Anupgarh district
- Tehsil: Rawla Mandi

Government
  - Sarpanch: Kuldeep Bhambhu

Population
  - Total: 10,000

Languages
  - Official: Hindi
- Time zone: UTC+5:30 (IST)
- PIN: 335707
- Telephone code: 01506
- Vehicle registration: RJ-13
- Website: https://sites.google.com/view/365head

365 Head, also called 2 KLD is a village in Anupgarh district of Rajasthan, India. It is located in the south-western region of Gharsana Tehsil, 74 kilometers from Anupgarh district headquarter and 198.2 kilometers from Ganganagar. 365 Head has gram panchayat (an Indian rural administration unit) status. It is named after the 365 R.D. of Anoopgarh branch canal.

== Culture ==
Bagri, Punjabi, Hindi, Sindhi and Marwari languages are spoken there. People practice Hindu, Sikh, Baudh and Islam religions.

== Education ==
=== Colleges ===
- M.D. College (Arts and computer)

=== Senior secondary schools ===
- Govt. senior secondary school
- Oxford Children Academy Sr. Sec School [art] mandi 365 head

=== Secondary schools ===
- Durga Public Secondary School
- Sharda Bal Niketan Secondary School

=== Upper Primary Schools ===
- Sarswati Vidya Vihar Upper Primary School
- Ravinder Nath Tagore Upper Primary School
- Swami Vivekanand Memorial Upper Primary School
- Sanskar Academy English Medium School

=== Computer Education Center ===
- Career Defense Academy 365 Head
- Tathagat Computer Education Center

== Location ==
365 head is in the southern part of Rawla tehsil of Anupgarh district. It is 74 km from Anupgarh, 200 km from Shri Ganganagar and 135 km from Bikaner. It is situated on the Indo-Pakistani border.
