= Rawla Mandi tehsil =

Rawla Mandi Tehsil
- Tehsil
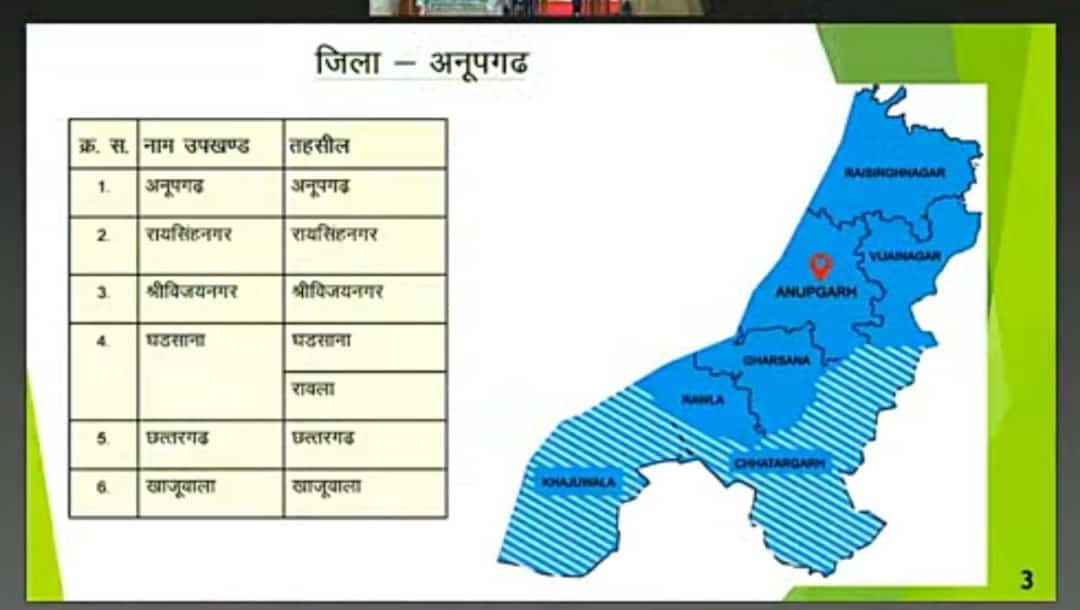
- A map of Anupgarh district with Rawla Mandi Tehsil highlighted
- Country: India
- State: Rajasthan
- District: Anupgarh
- Headquarters: Rawla Mandi

Rawla Mandi Tehsil is one of the five tehsils from the Anupgarh district in Rajasthan, India. It was carved out of Gharsana tehsil and given the status of tehsil by CM Vasundhara Raje in 2017. To the north its bordered by Gharsana tehsil of Anupgarh district and Chhatargarh and Khajuwala tehsil of Bikaner district are in the south. To its west, across the international border, is the Fort Abbas Tehsil of Pakistan.
