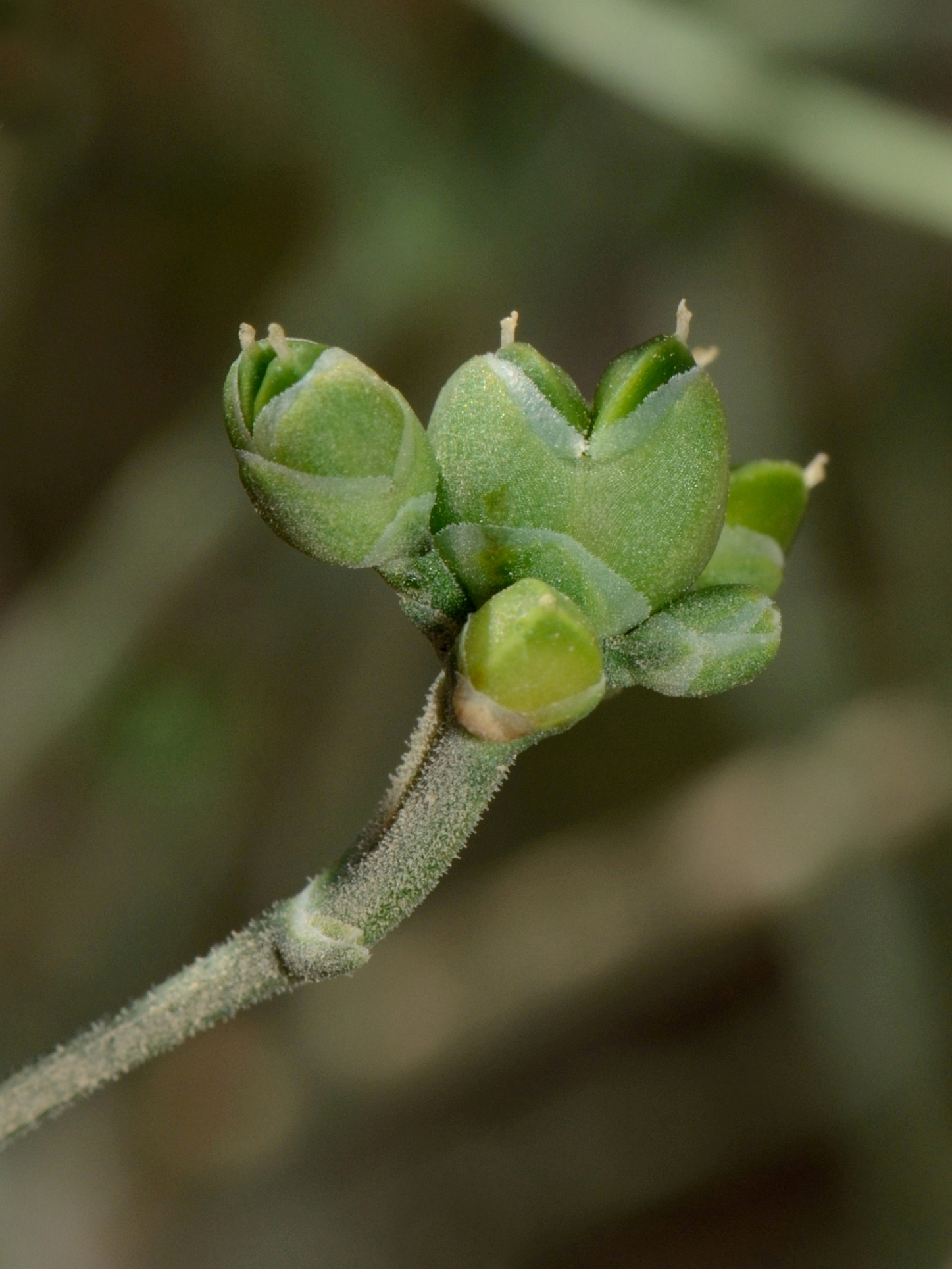

Conservation status
- Least Concern (IUCN 3.1)

Scientific classification
- Kingdom: Plantae
- Clade: Embryophytes
- Clade: Tracheophytes
- Clade: Spermatophytes
- Clade: Gymnosperms
- Division: Pinophyta
- Class: Pinopsida
- Subclass: Gnetidae
- Order: Ephedrales
- Family: Ephedraceae
- Genus: Ephedra
- Species: E. foliata

Binomial name
- Ephedra foliata Boiss. ex C.A.Mey.

Synonyms
- Ephedra alte C.A.Mey.; Ephedra ciliata Fisch. & C.A.Mey.; Ephedra ciliata Aitch.; Ephedra asparagoides Griff.; Ephedra alte Brandis; Ephedra kokanica Regel; Ephedra peduncularis Boiss.; Ephedra polylepis Boiss. & Hausskn.; Ephedra rollandii Maire; Ephedra aitchisonii (Stapf) V.A.Nikitin

= Ephedra foliata =

Species of plant in the family Ephedraceae

Ephedra foliata is a species of gymnosperm in the Ephedraceae family. It is referred to by the common name shrubby horsetail. It is native to North Africa, and Southwest Asia, from Morocco and Mauritania east to Turkmenistan, Pakistan, and Punjab State in India.

== Taxonomy ==
Ephedra foliata was originally described by Pierre Edmond Boissier, later validly published by Carl Anton von Meyer in 1846, and placed in section Pseudobaccatae (=sect. Ephedra), "tribe" Scandentes by Otto Stapf in 1889. In 1996 Robert A. Price classified E. foliata in section Ephedra without recognizing a tribe.
