= Khajuwala =

Khajuwala Beriawali
- Town
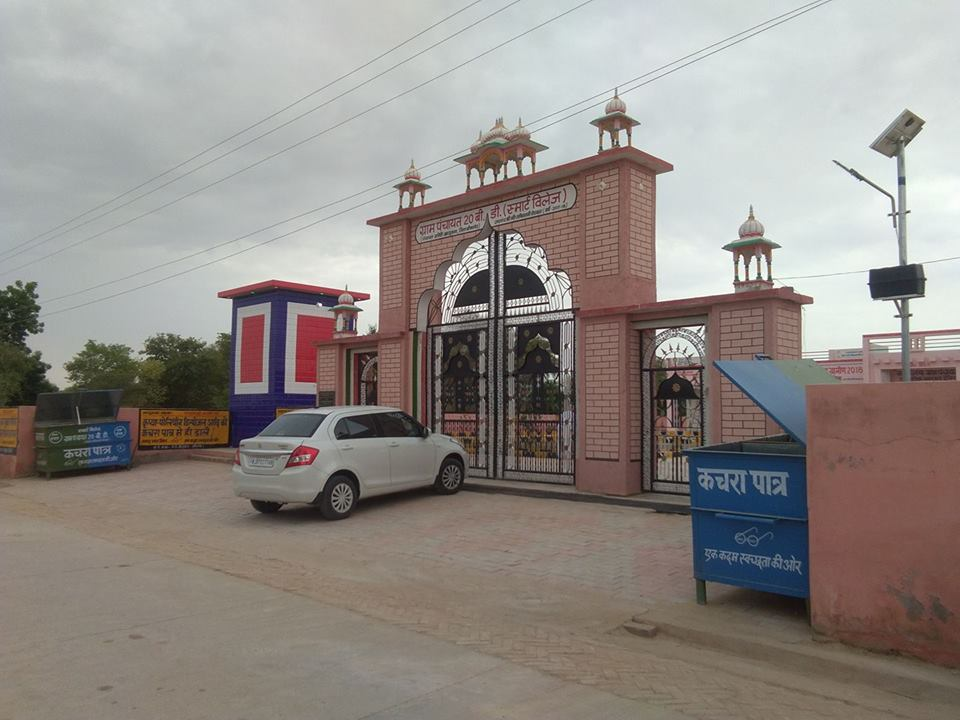
- Smart village in Khajuwala

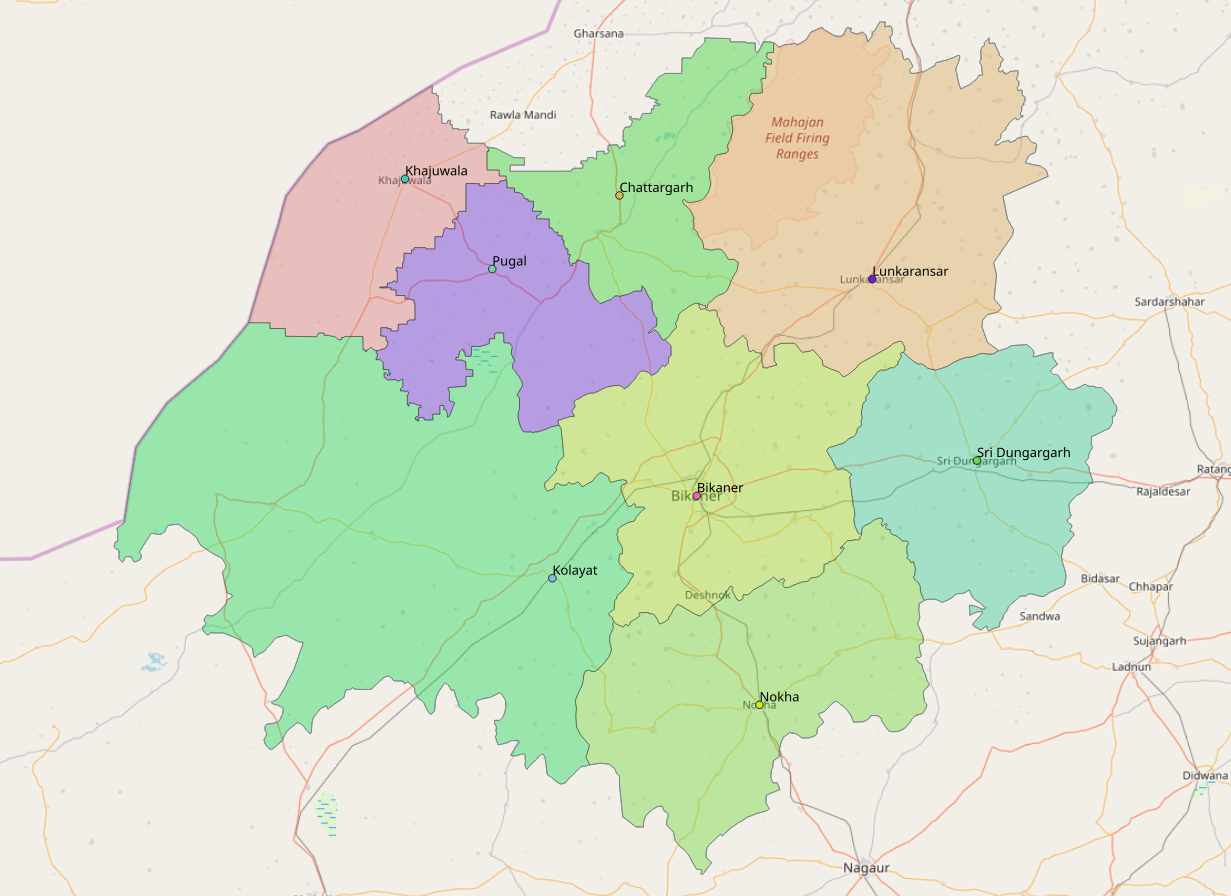
- Location in Rajasthan, India Khajuwala (Rajasthan) Khajuwala (India)
- Coordinates: 28.702°N 72.591°E
- Country: India
- State RAJASTHAN: Rajasthan
- District: Bikaner
- Tehsil: Khajuwala

Government
  - Body: Gram panchayat

Area
  - Total: 9 km^{2} (3.5 sq mi)

Population (2011)
  - Total: 15,784
  - Density: 1,418/km^{2} (3,670/sq mi)

Languages
  - Official: Hindi
  - Regional language: Bagri, Rajasthani, Punjabi, Sindhi
- Time zone: UTC+5:30 (IST)
- PIN: 334023
- Telephone code: +91 01520
- ISO 3166 code: IN-RJ
- Vehicle registration: RJ-07
- Nearest city: Bikaner
- Sex ratio: 1000:903 ♂/♀
- Literacy: 65.92%
- Climate: Average high (°C) 33.76 (Köppen)

Khajuwala is a town in the Bikaner district of Rajasthan, India. It is located near the Indo-Pakistan border (23 kilometres (14 mi)) and is situated around 113 kilometres (70 mi) from the district headquarters Bikaner. It is an intermediate panchayat with several villages under its administration. It produces a lot of raw cotton and wheat. Indira Gandhi Canal has brought about development of this area. It is a big agro products market in Bikaner district. Earlier its name was Beriyawali. It is also seat in Rajasthan legislative assembly. The current elected Member of Legislative assembly (MLA) from Khajuwala is Govind ram meghwal (INC).

Khajuwala has recently been given a status of Panchayat samiti.

Khajuwala also has many industries such as mustard oil mills and cotton spinning mills. There are a large number of brick kilns on the outskirts of the town and there are also gypsum mines and plants.

It is the leading wheat, cotton, mustard and guar producing tehsil of Bikaner district.

Marwari *(Bikaneri) is the native language of Khajuwala.

== Geography ==
Khajuwala is in the Thar Desert. Thorny shrubs and sandy dunes are the basic characteristics of this region. Kikar(Acacia), Aak (Calotropis procera), Khejari (Prosopis cineraria), Khimp (Leptadenia pyrotechnica), Lathiya, Laana and Booiin (Aerva tomentosa), Tumba(Citrullus colocynthis) make natural vegetation of this area. According to experts Khajuwala area is enriched with fertile soil for crops. Gypsum rocks are assets of this region.

== Culture ==
Language - Majority of the people speaks Bagri followed by Punjabi, Hindi, Sindhi speakers.

Religion - Majority of People practise the Hindu with a large Sikh and Buddhist minority. Muslims are also present in significant numbers. Many people follow Radha Swami, Sacha Sauda, and Nirankari Mission Deras.

== Governance ==
Khajuwala is currently a gram panchayat local government. Khajuwala is divided into 23 wards. Khajuwala is a Tehsil and panchayat samiti also. Khajuwala was given municipality status in previous years, but returned to the status of village panchayat due to the government's indifference. The main census town is known as Beriawali and Panchayat, and also Beriawali.

== Economy ==
People are mainly dependent on agriculture-based trades.

=== Agriculture ===
The waters of IGNP canal has brought changes to flora and fauna and agriculture of wheat, mustard, cotton, Guar, pulses and Jawar has given a composite form of sandy dunes and green fields. This region with Gharsana is called cotton-belt but now things are changing. Average annual rainfall has fallen dramatically in the last few years. Since key source of irrigation is canal-water, water supply is inadequate for agriculture.

=== Government and public services ===
The government runs the local schools, a community health care centre, veterinary hospital, excise department office and the Office of Forest Department. A police station and BSF campus are in the town. Branches of the State Bank of India (SBI), Punjab National Bank (PNB), ICICI Bank, Bank of Baroda (BOB), Rajasthan Marudhara Gramin Bank (RMGB) and the Central Co-operative Bank also operate here. ATM facilities are available at the SBI, BOB, ICICI and PNB banks. A sub-post office branch is also available here.

=== Industries ===
In terms of industry, gypsum grinding factories occupy the most important place. Raw gypsum material is supplied from villages. The government central processing unit is perhaps the largest such unit in the Asian continent. After grinding, gypsum is transported to other northern Indian cities where gypsum-based large-scale industries use it as a raw material.

There are many oil mills, cotton mills, and brick factories. There was a time when the Khajuwala area was known for its high yield of cotton. A number of factories for processing cotton were shut down in recent decades. Various markets work to fulfil the needs of people of the town and its surrounding villages.

=== Minerals ===
Gypsum is the most common mineral found in the rocks of this area. The gypsum deposits occur in rocks of the tertiary period (roughly from the 6.6 crore to 25.8 lakhs years old period), and are considered to have been formed by an evaporation process.

== Transport ==
There are direct buses to Jaipur, Jodhpur, Sri Ganganagar, and Bikaner. There are Rajasthan State Road Transport Corporation (RSRTC) roadways buses also available for different routes.

== Tourism ==
India-Pakistan Border Ceremony is held here.

== See also ==
- Hindumalkote
- Tanot/Longewala
