= New Mandi Gharsana =

- Town
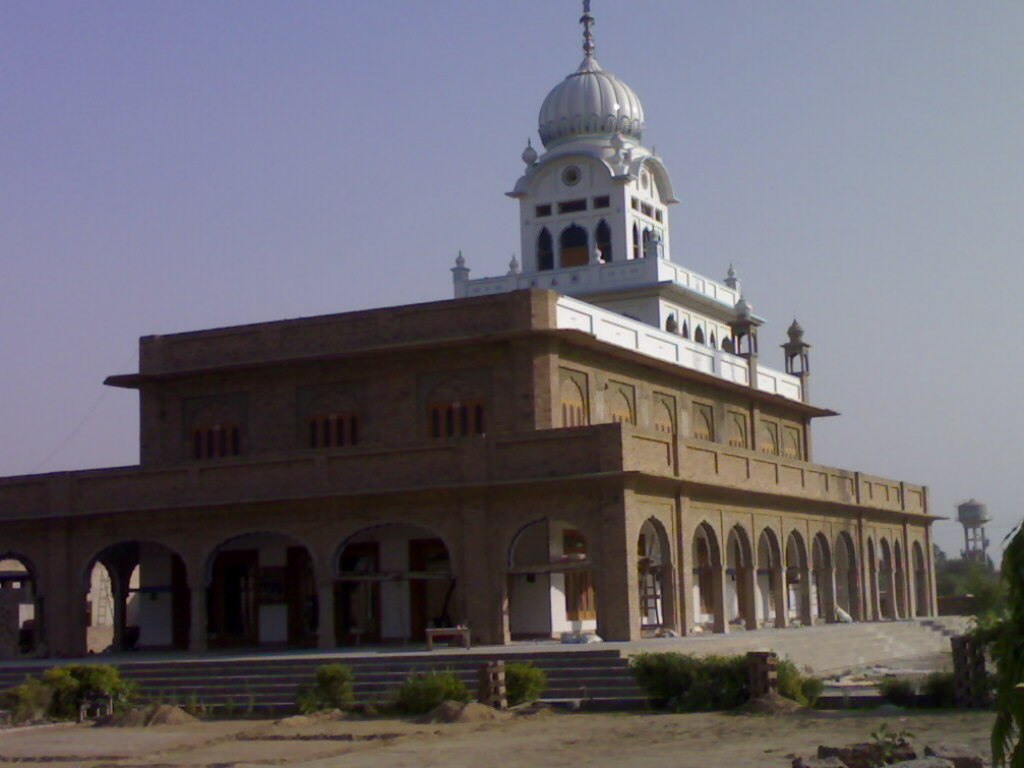
- A view of Guruduara Sahib at New Mandi Gharsana
- Country: India
- State: Rajasthan
- District: Sriganganagar district
- Time zone: UTC+5:30 (IST)
- PINs: 335707, 335711
- Telephone code: 01506
- Vehicle registration: RJ-13 RJ-62

New Mandi Gharsana is a town in Sriganganagar district in Rajasthan state, India. Gharsana is located in south of Anupgarh tehsil.
