= Vijainagar =

Sri Vijaynagar Sri Bijaynagar
- City
- Location in Rajasthan, India Sri Vijaynagar (India)
- Coordinates: 29°14′33.10″N 73°31′19.86″E
- Country: India
- State: Rajasthan
- District: Sri Ganganagar

Population (2011)
  - Total: 18,425

Languages
- Time zone: UTC+5:30 (IST)
- PIN: 335704
- Telephone code: 01498
- Vehicle registration: RJ 13

Vijaynagar (also written Sri Vijaynagar or Sri Bijaynagar) or Vijaynagar is a town and a municipality in Sri Ganganagar district in the Indian state of Rajasthan.

== Demographics ==
As of 2001 India census, Sri Bijaynagar had a population of 17,867. Males constitute 54% of the population and females 46%. Sri Bijaynagar has an average literacy rate of 62%, higher than the national average of 59.5%: male literacy is 69%, and female literacy is 54%. In Sri Bijaynagar, 16% of the population is under 5 years of age.

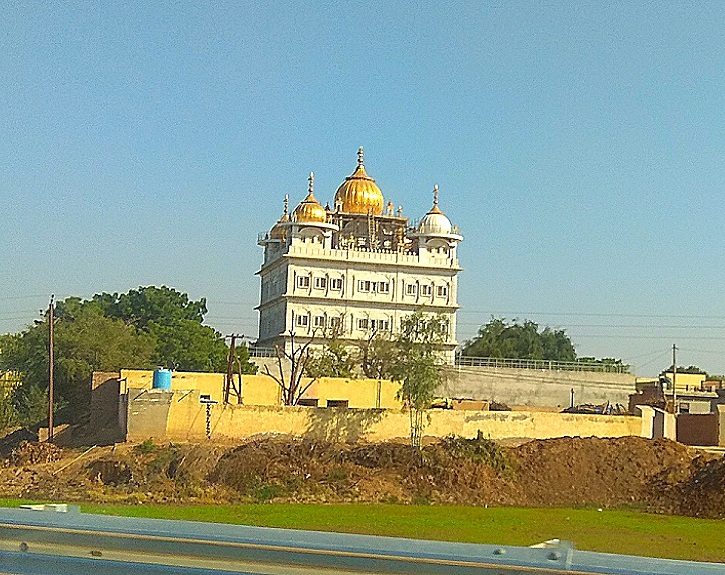
Baba Deva Singh Dera at 9 GB village is seeing worthy in Vijaynagar Tehsil

Sri Vijaynagar Tehsil is the one of seven tehsils of Sri Ganganagar district of Rajasthan, India. It is located in the eastern part of District Sri Ganganagar. It is bordered by Anupgarh tehsil in the west, by Raisinghnagar tehsil in the north, Suratgarh tehsil in the east, and Bikaner district in the south.

== History ==
Earlier it was area of sandy dunes, horny shrubs and trees. Arrival of waters of Gang canal and Indira Gandhi Canal by Anoopgarh branch has important role of flora and fauna of this area. People from other tehsils of Sriganganagar District, Bikaner and from Punjab and Haryana came here and composite culture took its place.

The name of this tehsil is in the memory of Prince Bijay Singh who is related to Bikaner State and its actual name is Shri Bijay Nagar but later on it is being called Sri Vijay Nagar. In older time Vijaynagar was the main tax collector's office.

== Geography ==
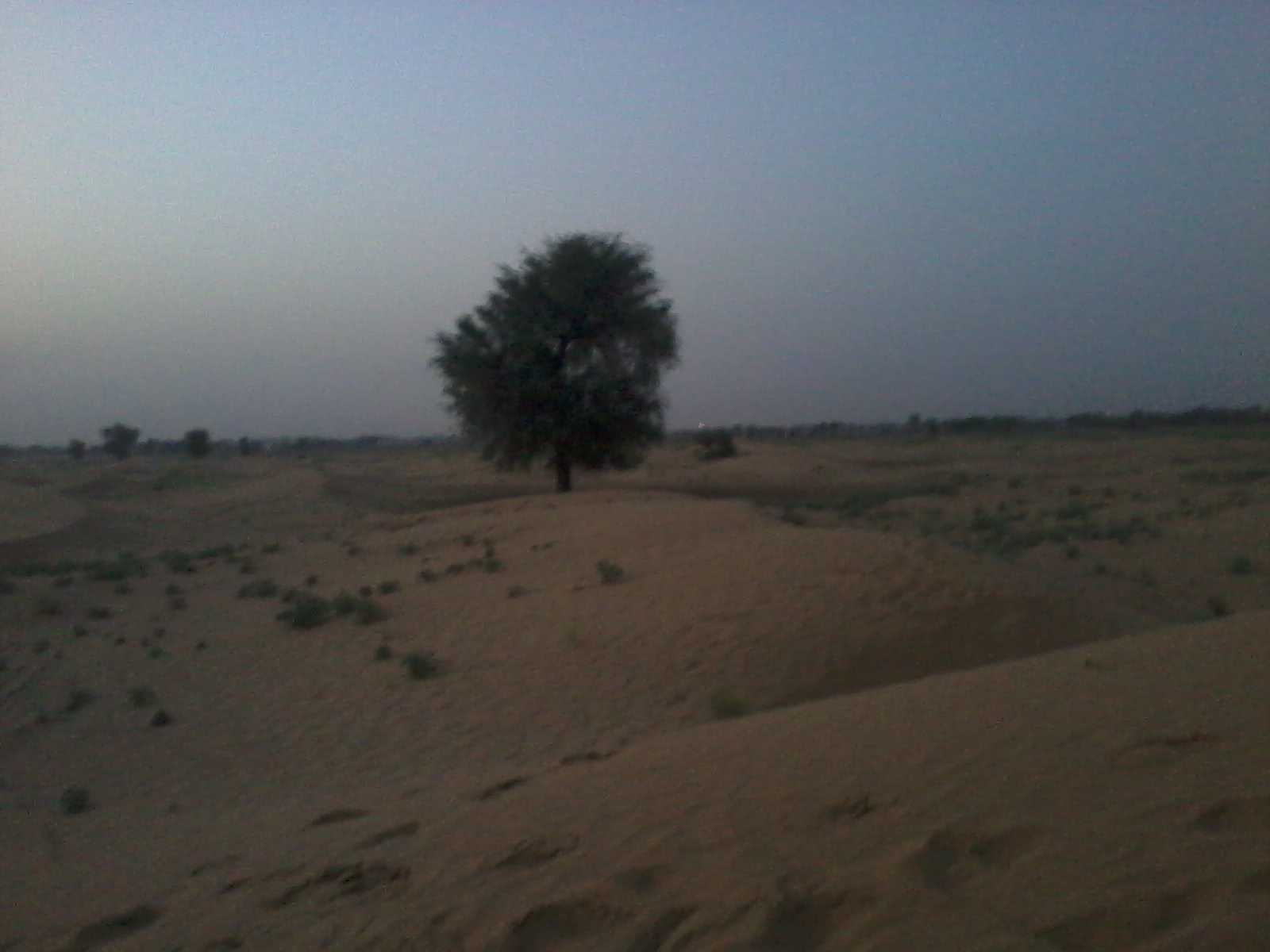
Desert in Bilochiya Village

This Tehsil is a part of the Thar Desert. Sandy dunes and horny shrubs, trees are basic characteristics of the area. Ghaggar River is the only river runs in rainy season. Irrigation by Gang canal in the name of the late Maharaja Shri Ganga Singh Ji Bahadur, His Highness Bikaner and Anoopgarh branch Distributry of Indira Gandhi Nahar canal has encouraged agricultural activities in the area.

Major towns and villages include Vijaynagar, the taluk headquarters, Jaitsar Shivpuri, Haripura, 22GB, 40GB, 46GB, 23GB,19GB, 20 GB, 18GB, Ram Singh Pur, 10AS Kupli, Motasar, Gomawali, 45GB, Bilochiya, 4 BLD, 31GB, 15 bld Ratnewala, Raghunathpura, Kalyankot, and 39GB.

== Demographics ==
Hinduism and Sikhism is practised by a majority of the people. Islam is the third most practised religion in the tehsil.

== Economy ==
Agriculture is main occupation of people. cotton, Wheat, Rice, Jawar, Gwar, mustard and paddy are the main crops. Entire market is based on Agriculture.

== Transport ==
Almost all large villages and cities are connected with roads. Sri Vijay Nagar is connected by railway line from Suratgarh to Anupgarh. Buses are easily available and preferred by the people as this facility is available for all the major districts of Rajasthan and Punjab, New Delhi, and Haryana. The first train was started in Sri Vijaynagar on 1 April 1930.
