= Anupgarh railway station =

Railway Station in Rajasthan, India

General information
- Location: Anupgarh, Sri Ganganagar, Rajasthan; India
- Coordinates: 29.1968°N 73.2046°E
- Elevation: 154 metres (505 ft)
- System: Indian Railways station
- Owner: Indian Railways
- Operator: North Western Railway
- Platforms: 2
- Tracks: 4
- Connections: Auto stand

Construction
- Structure type: Standard (on ground station)
- Parking: Yes
- Cycle facilities: Yes

Other information
- Status: Functioning
- Station code: APH
- Zone(s): North Western Railway
- Division(s): Bikaner

History
- Opened: Yes
Location

Anupgarh railway station is the main railway station in Anupgarh and is assigned code as APH.

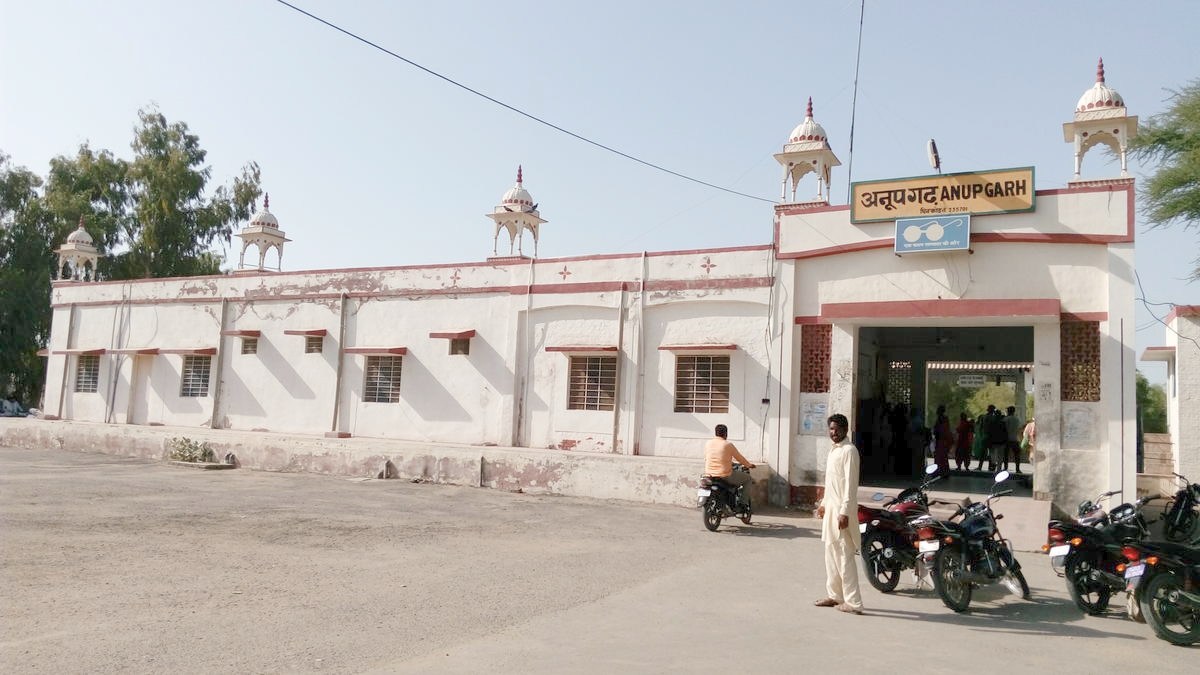
Anupgarh railway station (Railway Station in Rajasthan, India)

It serves the city of Anupgarh. Two platforms are functional. One side of the platform is sheltered. Water facilities for passengers are provided.
