= Karanpur tehsil =

Karanpur Tehsil कर्णपुर तहसील
- Tehsil
- Interactive map of Karanpur Tehsil
- Coordinates: 29°50′39″N 73°31′00″E
- Country: India
- State: Rajasthan
- District: Sri Ganganagar
- Headquarters: Karanpur city

Population (2011)
  - Total: 146,878
- Time zone: UTC+5:30 (IST)

Karanpur tehsil is one of the nine tehsils in Sri Ganganagar district, Rajasthan. It is located in the north-western part of the district. The city of Karanpur serves as the headquarters of the tehsil. Its north-western border adjoins Bahawalnagar district in Pakistani Punjab. To the east, it is bordered by Shriganganagar tehsil and Padampur tehsil, and to the south by Raisinghnagar tehsil.

== Geography ==
The tehsil is predominantly flat, characterised by rich Alluvial soil, with some areas featuring sandy soil.

== Agriculture ==
The crops in the area include wheat, barley, guar, cotton, moong, sugarcane, and mustard. Some areas also grow kinnow and mangoes.

== Demographics ==
According to the 2011 census of India, the population of Karanpur Tehsil is 146,878, with 77,193 males and 69,685 females.

The rural areas are primarily inhabited by agricultural tribes, predominantly Jat Sikhs from clans such as Sidhu, Sandhu, Sooch, Sidubrar, Bains, Pandher, Dhillon, Gill, and Dhaliwal.

The city is mainly inhabited by Aroras, Brahmins, and Banias.

SC & ST includes meghwal, meenas, nayak, etc.

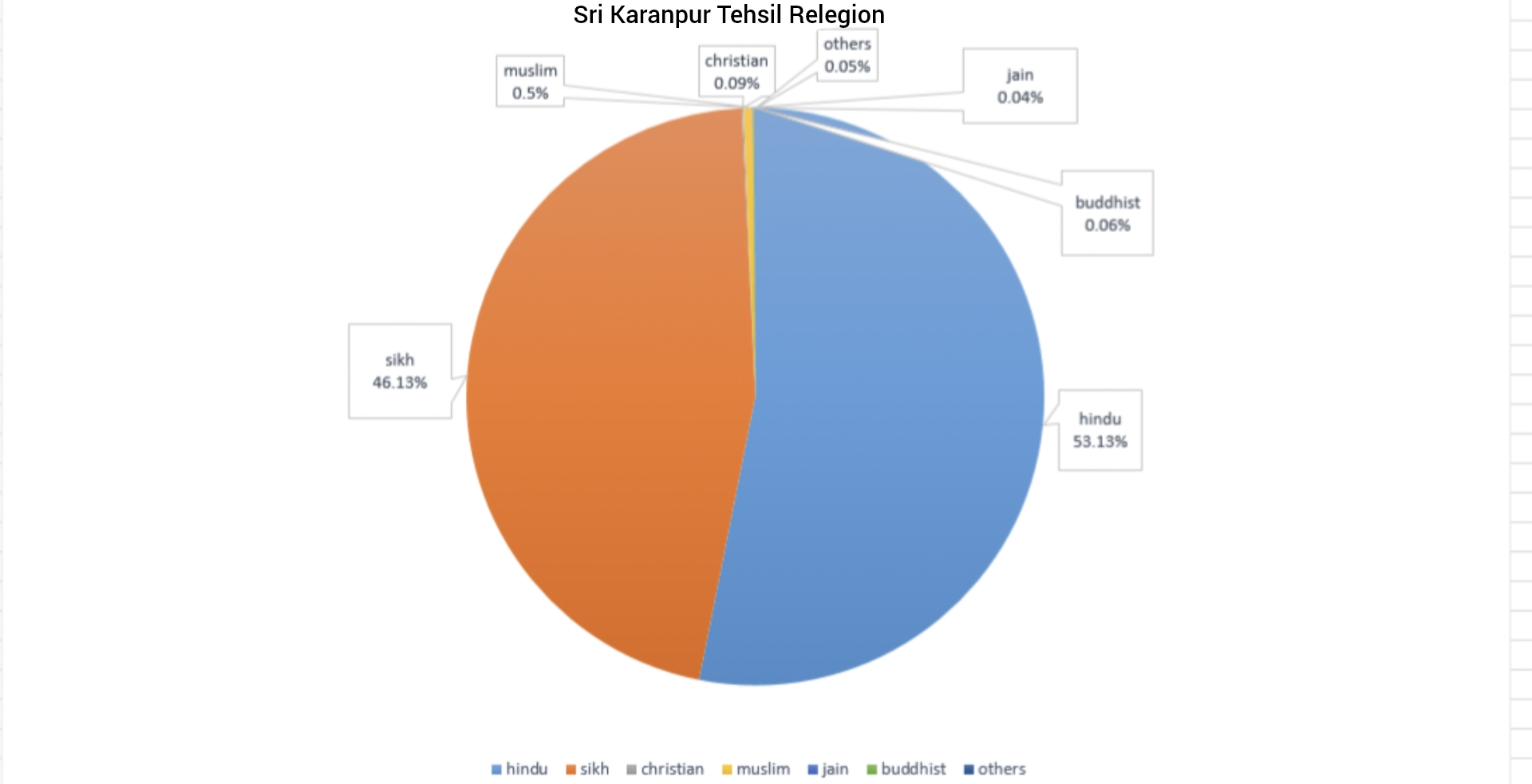
Religious composition of Karanpur Tehsil

== Literacy ==
According to the 2011 census of India, Karanpur Tehsil has a literacy rate of 60.09%, with 67.27% literacy among males and 52.15% literacy among females.
