= Hanuman Mandir 82 RB =

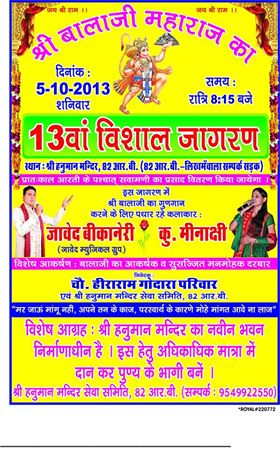
82 R.B. 82 R.B. Hanuman Mandir 82 R.B.
- Village
- Nickname: Rajdhani
- Location in Rajasthan, India
- Coordinates: 29°33′47.43″N 73°23′09.66″E
- Country: India
- State: Rajasthan
- District: Ganganagar

Government
  - Type: Local Body
  - Body: Gram Panchayat Lakha Hakam

Area
  - Total: 1 km^{2} (0.39 sq mi)

Population (2011)
  - Total: 535

Languages
- Time zone: UTC+5:30 (IST)
- PIN: 335051
- Telephone code: 01507
- Vehicle registration: RJ 13

82 R.B. is a village in Raisinghnagar tehsil in Sri Ganganagar district in the Indian state of Rajasthan.

== Demography ==
According to the 2011 Census of India, the population of the village was 535, of which 278 were male and 257 female. The census also reported that the village had a literacy rate of 78.82%, higher than the 66.11% of Rajasthan in general.

The primary religions are Hinduism and Sikhism.

== Economy ==
Economy of the 82 R.B.is dependent on agriculture in the surrounding area.

== Climate ==
The climate of 82 R.B. varies to extreme limits. The summer temperature reaches up to 50° Celsius and winter temperature dips just around -1° Celsius. The average annual rainfall is above 40 cm.

== Places of interest ==
82 R.B. has a well-known temple to Thakurji, A Hanuman mandir (temple) and a Hariram Dada Takiya.
