= Ramsinghpur =

Coordinates: 28°04′N 76°32′E

Ramsinghpur 59 Gb
- Town
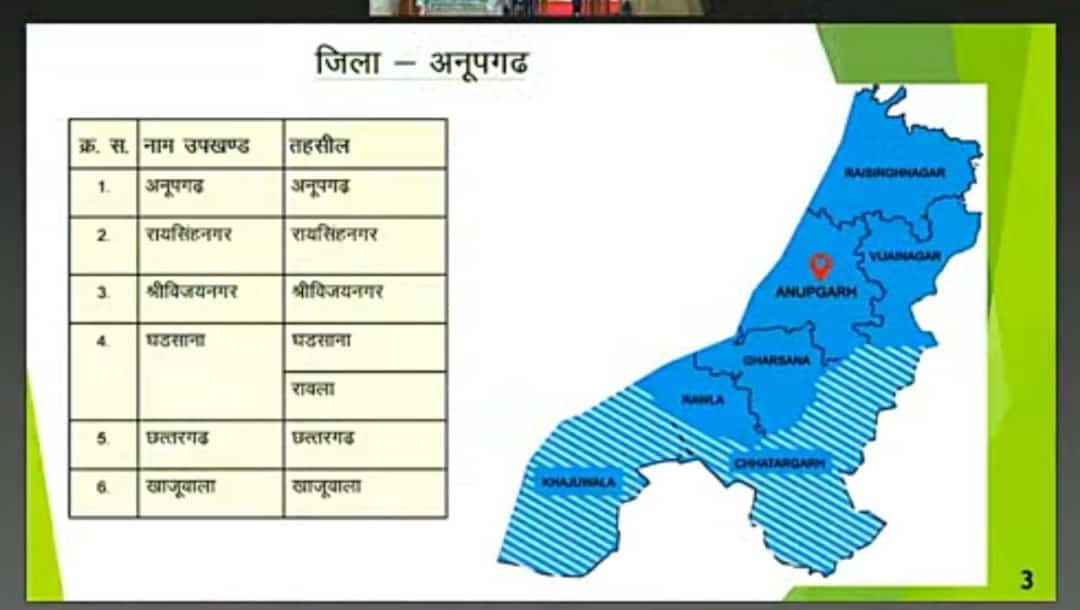

- Location in Rajasthan, India Ramsinghpur (India)
- Country: India
- State: Rajasthan
- District: Anupgarh
- Tehsil: Anupgarh
- Time zone: UTC+5:30 (IST)

Ramsinghpur, also known as 59 Gb, is a small town located in Anupgarh tehsil and is a sub-tehsil in district of Anupgarh in Rajasthan of India. It is located on Anupgarh-Suratgarh Road and is 20 km from Anupgarh and 19 km from Vijaynagar.

== Demographics ==
According to the census 2011, 59 Gb (Ramsinghpur) village has population of 2931 of which 1505 are males while 1426 are females as per Population Census 2011 with a sex ratio of 94 females per 1000 males. In 59 Gb village, most of the villagers are from Schedule Caste (SC). Schedule Caste (SC) constitutes 42.58 % while Schedule Tribe (ST) were 0.07 % of total population in 59 Gb village.

Demographics of Ramsinghpur (59 Gb) according to census 2011
Particulars	Total	Male	Female
Total No. of Houses	604	–	–
Population	2,931	1,505	1,426
Child (0-6)	373	190	183
Schedule Caste	1,248	633	615
Schedule Tribe	2	2	
Literacy	74.35 %	82.21 %	66.05 %
Total Workers	1,141	816	325
Main Worker	899	–	–
Marginal Worker	242	76	181
