= Ganeshgarh =

- Village
- Interactive map of Ganeshgarh
- Coordinates: 29°45′N 73°54′E
- Country: India
- State: Rajasthan
- District: Sri Ganganagar

Population (2011)
  - Total: 4,427
- ISO 3166 code: RJ-IN

Ganeshgarh is a village in Sri Ganganagar district in Rajasthan. It is 24 km from Sri Ganganagar on National Highway No. 15(62), and 450 km from Jaipur city. In the 2011 census, its population was 4427. There is an ICICI bank branch, and an veterinary hospital in the village. Ganeshgarh and Dungarsinghpura are touchable village like twins and the population of Dungarsinghpura was 4015 in 2011. #Dungarsinghpura have a separate gram panchayat .गांव मे एक एस.बी.आई.बेंक की शाखा व प्राथमिक स्वास्थ्य केंद्र है . .
