= Lakha Hakam =

- village
- Country: India
- State: Rajasthan
- District: Sri Ganganagar

Languages
  - Official: Hindi
- Time zone: UTC+5:30 (IST)
- PIN: 335021
- Telephone code: 01507
- ISO 3166 code: RJ-IN
- Vehicle registration: RJ 13
- Nearest city: Raisinghnagar

Lakha Hakam is a village in tehsil Raisinghnagar of Sri Ganganagar district in Rajasthan, India. It is situated near the border of India and Pakistan. This is a well-connected village. There is an ancient Peepal tree and a pond in the village. The Lakha Hakam name comes from a Muslim family. Around 250 years ago a megaram bhambhu came here and took the land of Lakha Hakam and its total calculated land was approximately 52,000 BIGHHA on rent from King of Bikaner principality. The man is the founder of this remote village. The oldest police station is here.

There are 250 families living in the village of which 200 families are Jats. The biggest Jat gotra in the village is Bhambhu. The Bhambhu have 70 families in the village. The other Jat gotras are Godara, Saharan and Dhayal. Presently it is ruled by Bhambhu Gotra only.

• Sardararam bhambhu, gyanaram bhambhu, nanakram bhambhu, Ratiraam bhambhu, jagmal bhambhu, netram bhambhu,

• ancient times, he handled the Chaudhar in the village.

== Education ==
There are 2 private and 1 government schools in village. Government school is one of the top government schools in sub-division. Ex. student Pooja Bhambhu topped district in her 12th class exam (science stream) currently she is pursuing B.Sc from Delhi University. Government school is giving good results every year, many teachers from this school got facilitated from SDM at sub-division level.

== Others ==
We can categories this village as developing. Most people in this village depend on farming for their income, there are some people who have chosen professions other than farming such as engineering, teaching, army and other government services. Nearby town is Raisinghnagar and major way of commuting is 2–3 private buses, one IRCTC bus also started recently. There is one hospital in village which has staff of 2–3 people including nurses.
