= Padampur =

Padampur may refer to:

- Padampur, Rajasthan, a city in Sri Ganganagar district, Rajasthan, India
- Padampur tehsil, in Sri Ganganar district, Rajasthan, India
- Padampur, Bargarh district, a town in Bargarh district, Odisha, India
- Padampur, a town in Seraikela Kharsawan district, Jharkhand, India
- Padampur (Odisha Vidhan Sabha constituency), a constituency in Bargarh district, Odisha, India
- Padampur, Nepal, a village development committee in Chitwan District, Nepal
- Padmapur, a town and NAC in Bargarh district in the Koshal region of Western Odisha, India

== See also ==
- Palampur, a town in Himachal Pradesh
