= Kesrisinghpur =

Kesrisinghpur Kesri singh Faridsar
- Town
- Nickname: KSP
- Location in Rajasthan, India Kesrisinghpur (India)
- Coordinates: 29.947535°N 73.621187°E
- Country: India
- [ Sub Division ]: Karanpur
- District: Sri Ganganagar
- Named for: Kesri Singh

Population (2011)
  - Total: 14,010

Languages
  - Official: Punjabi, Hindi, Rajasthani
- Time zone: UTC+5:30 (IST)
- Postal code: 335027
- ISO 3166 code: RJ-IN

Kesrisinghpur is a town and a municipality in Ganganagar district in the Indian state of Rajasthan.

== Demographics ==
As of 2011 India census, Kesrisinghpur had a population of 14,020. Males constitute 52.76% of the population and females 47.24%. Kesrisinghpur has an average literacy rate of 62%, higher than the national average of 59.5%: male literacy is 69%, and female literacy is 53%. In Kesrisinghpur, 16% of the population is under 6 years of age.

It is situated near the Punjab (state) border. It is located in the Cotton Belt area of India and the livelihood of most of the people residing in KesriSinghPur (KSP) is commission brokerage of grains and cotton and quite a lot of people are involved in agriculture.

== Transport and infrastructure ==
The infrastructure of town is now greatly developing. Cemented roads are everywhere in Kesrisinghpur.

By Train - there is direct train from Delhi Sarai Rohilla railway station [DEE] to Kesrisinghpur. Train no 12455/56 Delhi Sarai Rohila [DEE] to Bikaner [BKN] superfast express and from Sri Ganganagar few passenger trains to Suratgarh goes via Kesrisinghpur.

Developed townships-The town now has a completely developed township (CROWN CITY BY MRG GROUP) with 24hr water supply, underground sewer system, rain water harvesting system, parks, security guard, CCTV cameras, cc roads and shops.

Education- The town has English medium schools like RISING SUN CONVENT SCHOOL, GOLDEN FOUNDATION PUBLIC SCHOOL for high quality education with ease of transport for nearby village children's in the heart of city near railway station and bus stand for easy access.

== Economy ==
Following the construction of the Ganges Canal, the main occupation of near by villages is agriculture, which is also the basis of the city's economy. The main crops are wheat, mustard and cotton while other crops includes guar, bajra, sugar cane and grams. In recent years, kinnow (a hybrid citrus fruit derived from the orange and lemon) has also gained prominence with farmers. The industries in the city are mostly based on agriculture. The people of the town are involved in their family businesses. People have their own cows and rely heavily on their own organic vegetables (produce) from private farms.
