= 3 STR =

- Census Town
- Location in Rajasthan, India 3 STR (India)
- Coordinates: 29.011593°N 73.010845°E
- Country: India
- State: Rajasthan
- District: Ganganagar

Population (2001)
  - Total: 10,925

Languages
  - Official: Hindi
- Time zone: UTC+5:30 (IST)

3 STR is a census town in Ganganagar district in the state of Rajasthan, India.

== Demographics ==
As of 2001 India census, 3 STR had a population of 10,925. Males constitute 54% of the population and females 46%. 3 STR has an average literacy rate of 62%, higher than the national average of 59.5%; with 60% of the males and 40% of females literate. 16% of the population is under 6 years of age.
