= Shyam Rangeela =

Indian comedian

- Born: Shyam Sunder; 25 August 1994 (age 32); Hanumangarh, Rajasthan, India
- Other name: Rangeela
- Occupation: Comedian

Shyam Rangeela (born 25 August 1994), born as Shyam Sunder, is an Indian comedian and politician from Hanumangarh, Rajasthan.

== Early life ==
Rangeela was born on 25 August 1994 in the village of Manaktheri of Pilibanga town of Hanumangarh in the Indian state of Rajasthan. His father, Jawahar Lal is a farmer. He left this village in 2013 and moved to a new village. Rangeela's family presently lives in Mokamawala village of Raisinghnagar town of Sri Ganganagar. He belongs to a Hindu family. Shyam's education till eighth grade took place in the village of Manaktheri, then till the twelfth in Suratgarh. After that, he did an animation course in Jaipur from 2012 to 2015.

== Comedy career ==
Rangeela gained attention when he performed in The Great Indian Laughter Challenge, mimicking Prime Minister Narendra Modi and Congress leader Rahul Gandhi, receiving a standing ovation from the judge Akshay Kumar, although it never aired. Prior to that, he had performed in an institute at Jaipur and imitated those politicians.

== Political career ==
Rangeela joined the Aam Aadmi Party in May 2022, after sharing a series of tweets stating how TV shows were rejecting him repeatedly because his comedy was "too political".

He was supposed to contest the 2024 Indian general elections from Varanasi constituency as an independent candidate. However his nomination was rejected by the Election Commission of India.
