= Ramjiwala =

Coordinates: 29°35′N 78°06′E

Ramjiwala is a small village in Raisingh Nagar tehsil, Ganganagar District, in the Indian state of Rajasthan.
