= Ganguwala =

- Location within Rajasthan Location within India
- Coordinates: 29°35′29″N 73°36′42″E
- Country: India
- State: Rajasthan
- Elevation: 169 m (554 ft)

Population
  - Total: 1,009
- Time zone: UTC+5 (IST)
- ISO 3166 code: RJ-IN

Ganguwala is a village located in the Sri Ganganagar district in the Indian State of Rajasthan.
