= Padampur tehsil =

Area
  - Total: 857 km^{2} (331 sq mi)

Padampur tehsil is one of the ten tehsils of Ganganagar district in the northwestern Indian state of Rajasthan.

== Geography ==
It is located in the northern part of the district. Padampur is the tehsil headquarters. Its north border touches Ganganagar tehsil. It has borders in the east with Sadulshahar Tehsil and with Hanumangarh district. The south-east border is with Suratgarh tehsil, the west by Raisinghnagar tehsil and north-west with Karanpur tehsil. The Village Delwan lies 5 kilometres (3.1 mi) to the north-west. Padampur, Gajsinghpur, Binjhbayla, Fakirwali and Ridmalsar are the main towns and the Village Delwan of the tehsil. Binjhbayla is a Sub Tehsil in Padampur.

The waters of the Ganges Canal irrigate the farms of this tehsil.

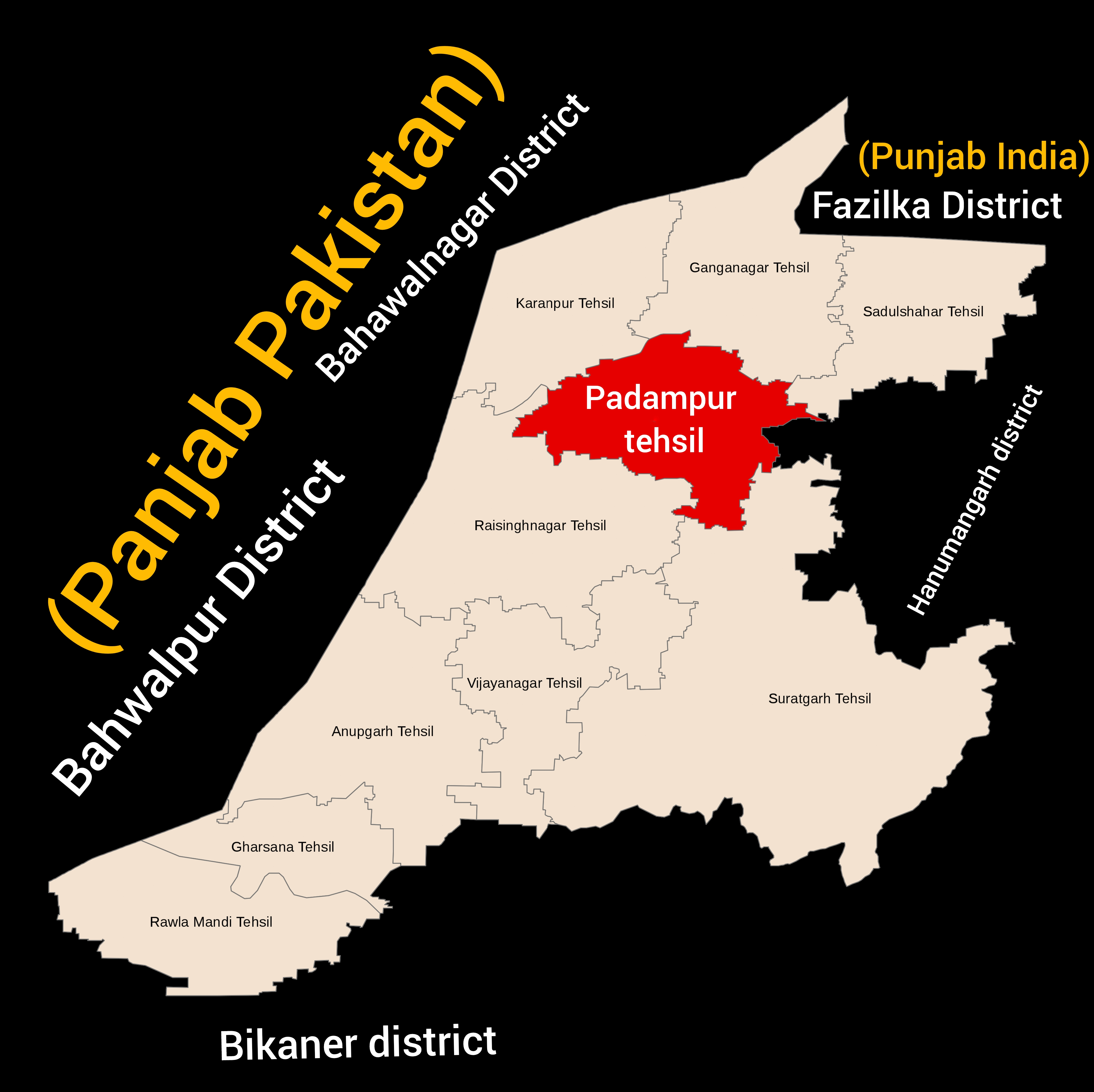
Padampur Tehsil

The tehsil's soil is of sandy alluvial soil.

== Agriculture ==
The area is famous for Wheat, barley, Mustard, Jowar, Gavar/Gavara, Moong, Cotton, Bajra and sugarcane to a lesser extent.

== History ==
The Tehsil was area of Pacchada Dielect Punjabi speakers mainly of Johiya Clan and bagri speakers of Punia, Saharan etc bagri speakers the area came under Bikaner riyasat when Diwan Hindumal included the area of the Ganganagar District in Bikaner Riyasat.

In the 1920's raja Ganga Singh of Bikaner constructed the Ganges canal, but the project was too expensive and the state though large had barren land, fewer people, and businesses for generating revenue. Raja had to take a loan from Patiala Riyasat of Punjab. At first raja tried to attract locals but was not successful as they had no experience of farming with Wells and canals as was common on the Punjab Plains. Raja visited Punjab and appealed to the Farmers and Landlords there, mainly Jatt Sikhs to purchase land and develop the area. Most settled in Padampur tehsil.

Bera mandi was the market area before the rise of Padampur.

== Demographics ==
The majority of clans related to landlords in the Tehsil. Jatts clans included Sandhu, Kahlon, Bains, Sidhu, Johal, Sidhubrar, Bhangu, Mangat, Sial, Dhillon, Dhaliwal, Tiwana, Kooner, Sunner, Kaler Gill, Kharal, and Shergill. Bagris clans included Punia, Jakhar, Saharan, Datarwal, and Siggar.

in the city the major Arora clans are Chawla, Punyani, Setia, and Makkar and among brahmins are Sharma, Joshi, and Divedi.

The Population of Padampur Tehsil is 1,62,718 with 17.4% living in Urban area and 82.6% in Rural areas. Literacy rate of tehsil is 70.48% tehsil has sex Ratio of 904 Females per 1000 males.

Punjabi and Bagri (a dialect of the Rajasthani language) are spoken. The religions of tehsil in percentage are:

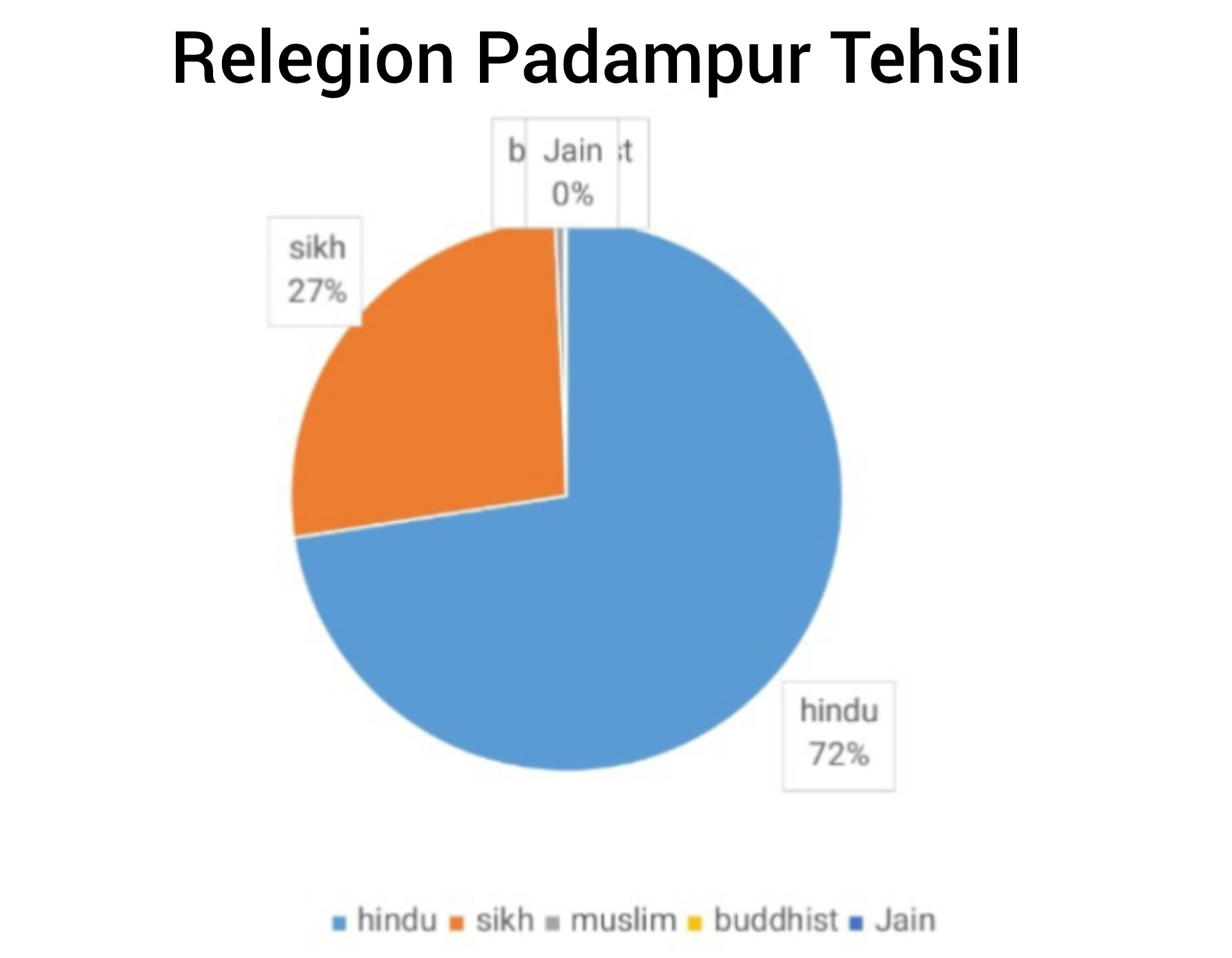
Religions in Padampur District
