= Anupgarh Tehsil =

Coordinates: 29.1978312°N 73.1605983°E

- Tehsil
- Map of Sri Ganganagar district with Anupgarh Tehsil highlighted
- Country: India
- State: Rajasthan
- District: Ganganagar
- Headquarters: Anupgarh

Population (2011)
  - Tehsil: 184,423
  - Urban: 30,877
  - Rural: 153,546

Anupgarh Tehsil is a one of tehsils of the Ganganagar district in Rajasthan, India. The tehsil headquarters are located at the town of Anupgarh.

== Demographics ==
People have migrated from Sri Ganganagar, Bikaner district, Punjab and Haryana.

=== Religion ===
Hinduism and Sikhism are practised by the majority of people.

Religion-wise Population - Anupgarh Tehsil
Religion	Total	Percentages	Male	Female
Hindu	125,624	68.12%	66,075	59,549
Sikh	56,119	30.43%	29,557	26,562
Muslim	2,394	1.3%	1,265	1,129
Christian	145	0.08%	83	62
Buddhist	34	0.02%	21	13
Jain	6	0.003%	2	4
Other Religion	7	0.003%	4	3
No Religion Specified	94	0.05%	57	37

As of the Census of India 2011, Anupgarh Tehsil had 184,423 residents, with 153,546 (83.26%) people living in rural areas and 30,877 (16.74%) people living in urban areas. The 2001 census counted a total of 174,413 residents.

As per the Population Census 2011 data, following are some quick facts about Anupgarh Tehsil.

Contents	Total	Male	Female
Children (Age 0-6)	24,788	13,208	11,580
Literacy	66.34%	65.39%	48.57%
Scheduled Caste	82,483	43,025	39,458
Scheduled Tribe	1,024	580	444
Illiterate	78,518	33,591	44,927

=== Literacy Rate ===
As of the Census of India 2011 the Average literacy rate of Anupgarh Tehsil in 2011 were 66.34% in which, male and female literacy were 75.69% and 55.99% respectively. Total literate in Anupgarh Tehsil were 105,905 of which male and female were 63,473 and 42,432 respectively.

== Geography ==
Anupgarh Tehsil is located in the western part of Anupgarh District.

=== Adjacent tehsils ===
- Raisinghnagar Tehsil (north)
- Vijaynagar Tehsil (east)
- Gharsana Tehsil (southwest)
- Chhatargarh Tehsil (southeast)
- Haroonabad Tehsil, Bahawalnagar District, Punjab, Pakistan (northwest)
- Fort Abbas Tehsil, Bahawalnagar District, Punjab, Pakistan (southwest)

=== Physical geography ===
The northern portion of the tehsil is part of the Nali region, a central area of the Sri Ganganagar District characterized by the flow of the Ghaggar River. The terrain of the southern portion of the tehsil can be characterized by sand dunes. This portion is being irrigated by branches of the Indira Gandhi Canal Project.

== Languages ==
Hindi is the official language. Bagri, a dialect of the Rajasthani language, and Marwari language are spoken by the majority of people. English and Sikh Bawri are also spoken by a few people. Odh and Bawri people speak their unique languages.

== Transport ==
Almost all big villages are connected with roads. Anupgarh and Ramsinghpur are connected with a railway line in this tehsil.

== Settlements ==
Major towns and villages within the tehsil include:

- Anupgarh
- Ramsinghpur (59GB)
- 11L.M.
- Patroda (11P))
- 27 A
- 80Gb
- 74Gb
- KHALL (4 KAM)
- Banda Colony(1LSM)
