= Padampur, Rajasthan =

Padampur Bairran ( old name )
- City

- Location in Rajasthan, India
- Coordinates: 29.707557°N 73.6256494°E
- Country: India
- State: Rajasthan
- District: Sri Ganganagar
- Elevation: 165 m (541 ft)

Population (2011)
  - Total: 18,420

Languages
  - Official: Hindi, Rajasthani
  - Regional: Bagri
- Time zone: UTC+5:30 (IST)
- PIN: 335041
- ISO 3166 code: RJ-IN
- Vehicle registration: RJ-13
- Website: www.facebook.com/padampur

Padampur is a City and a municipality, just 39 km from Sri Ganganagar city in Sri Ganganagar District in the Indian state of Rajasthan. The city was named after Padam Khurana, grandson of Dr. Tola Ram Khurana

== History ==
The town came to existence in 1920s as a village named Chak no 22BB before that the major market of the area was Bera mandi just 3 km outside of Padampur. there is another old village north of padampur that is now known as Farmahwali but old name was Francewali.

== Geography ==
Located in southwest of the Ganganagar district, the city has an average elevation of 165 metres (541 ft)

There is no direct railway link to the city. The nearest main railway station is at Sri Ganganagar, approximately 40 kilometres (25 mi) away, or Gajsinghpur, which is 20.5 kilometres (12.7 mi) away and connected by a four lane highway. There is 132 KV grid substation which is being upgraded to 220 KV near the village. The public transport system of the Rajasthan Government provides basic transportation facility to the people.

== Demographics ==
Padampur tehsil had a population of about 163000. and the population of city was 18,420. Males constitute 53% of the population and females 47%. Padampur has an average literacy rate of 64%, higher than the national average of 59.5%: male literacy is 70%.

The demographics of Padampur show evidence of a large and ethnically diverse people. The area is mostly inhabited by Hindus. Major languages spoken are Rajasthani and Bagri. The area continues to be the gateway for legal work for the nearby villages. As of 2012 the area has been categorized in 20 wards circle headed by ward member of that area selected by the residents of the ward.

The relegions of padampur town in below chart in percentage are

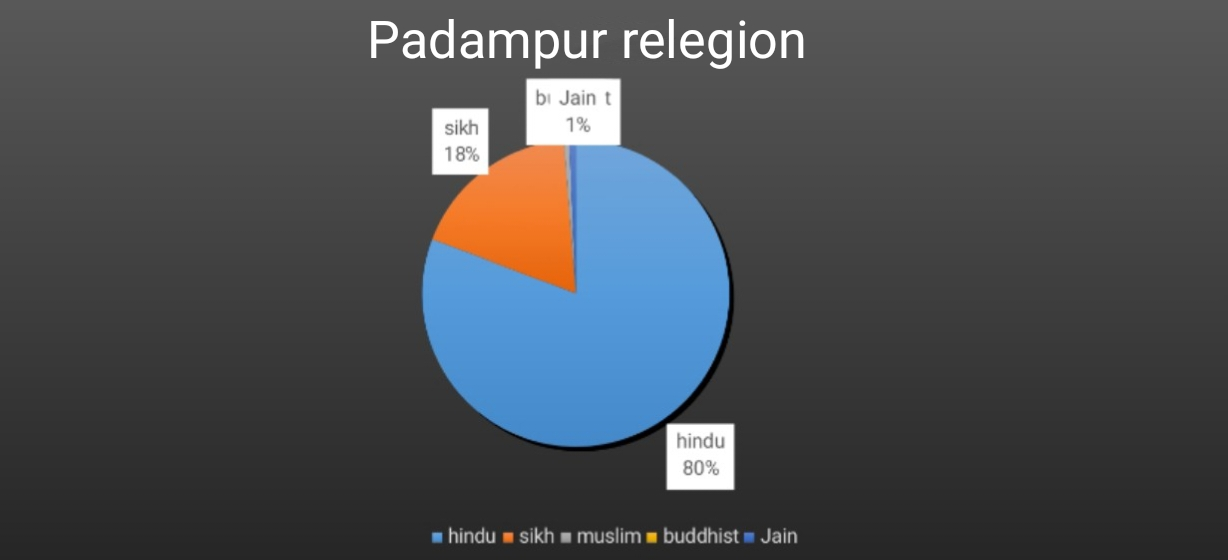
Relegions of Padampur Town

== Economy ==
Following the construction of the Ganges Canal (Rajasthan), the main occupation of near by villages is agriculture, which is also the basis of the city's economy. The main crops are wheat, mustard and cotton while other crops includes guar, bajra, sugar cane and grams. In recent years, kinnow (a hybrid citrus fruit derived from the "orange") has also gained prominence with farmers. The industries in the city are mostly based on agriculture. The people of the town are involved in their family businesses.MLA of padampur - Rupinder Singh Kooner 25BB

== Climate ==
The climate of Padampur experiences extreme variations. The average temperature in summer reaches around 41 °C and in winter around 26 °C and reach lowest at 2 degree Celsius at the end of December and in January. It shoots up to 50 °C in June. The average annual rainfall is only 200 mm (7.9 in) per year. Lack of rain and irrigation affect the income of farmers of the villages of Padampur.
