= Major Rajasthani =

Indian singer-songwriter

- Born: Major Singh Buttar; 14 January 1961; 5kk buttran, Sri Ganganagar
- Origin: Sri Ganganagar
- Died: 14 December 1999 (aged 38)
- Genres: Folk, duets
- Occupations: Singer, songwriter
- Label: Goyal Music

Major Rajasthani was a Punjabi singer-songwriter associated with Punjabi music. He was specially known for his sad songs.

== Early life and family ==
Major Rajasthani was born as Major Singh on 14 January 1961 in village 5KK Buttran, Ganganagar district, Rajasthan. His father's name was Jeet Singh and mother Dhan Kaur. He was the youngest sibling among five brothers and one sister. He married Sehajpreet Kaur. They settled in Rampura Phul in Punjab after marriage. He had two children named Navdeep Rajasthani and Jyoti.His son is also a music composer and he has a music production house named MR Music Studio in Rampura Phul

== Career ==
Some of his popular albums:

- Aatam Hattya (the suicide)
- Car Ribnan Wali
- Chandri Bulauno Hatgi
- Dhanwad Vichole Da
- Jimmewar Tu Vairne
- Pehli Mulaqat
- Tere Gham Vich Ni Kurhiye
- Yaad Chandri
- Garib da dil
- Jind Likhti Tere Na
- Sadi Yaad Vairne
- Chunni Shagana Di
- Tere gam vich ni kudiye
- Malwe Da Munda

Religious

- Aaja Baba Nanaka
- Machhiware Dian Janglan Ch

== Death ==
Major Rajasthani performed his last stage show on 10 December 1999 in Barnala with Mumtaaj. He died on 14 December 1999 after heart attack.
