= Kikarwali =

Village in Rajasthan, India

Kikarwali is a small village and a Gram panchayat in Raisinghnagar, a sub-district in the Indian state of Rajasthan.
