= Rang Mahal, Sri Ganganagar =

Rang Mahal Rangmahal
- Village
- Location in Rajasthan, India Rang Mahal (India)
- Coordinates: 29°23′18.59″N 73°57′23.42″E
- Country: India
- State: Rajasthan
- District: Ganganagar district

Languages
- Time zone: UTC+5:30 (IST)
- PIN: 335804
- ISO 3166 code: RJ-IN
- Vehicle registration: RJ 13

Rang Mahal is a village and an ancient Kushan era archaeological site on Suratgarh-Hanumangarh road in Suratgarh tehsil of Sri Ganganagar district in the Indian state of Rajasthan. It can be reached from Hanumangarh, Pilibangan, Suratgarh. Suratgarh is the nearest major railway station to Rang mahal village.

== Rang Mahal culture ==
Rang Mahal culture, a collection of more than 124 sites spread across Sriganganagar, Suratgarh, Sikar, Alwar and Jhunjhunu districts along the palaeochannel of Ghaggar-Hakra River (Sarasvati-Drishadvati rivers) dating to Kushan (1st to 3rd CE) and Gupta (4th to 7th CE) period, is named after the first archaeological Theris excavated by the Swedish scientists at Rang Mahal village which is famous for the terracota of the early gupta period excavated from the ancient theris in the village. The Rang Mahal culture is famed for the beautifully painted vases on red surface with floral, animal, bird and geometric designs painted in black. Several of these sites have layers representing Harappan culture, Painted Grey Ware culture (PWC) associated with vedic period and post-vedic Rangmahal culture. Some of the mounds are up to 35 and 40 ft in height, and some even had mud fortification walls around them.
