= Sri Ganganagar Medical College =

Medical College in Rajasthan, India

- Other name: GMC Sri Ganganagar
- Type: Public (Government medical college)
- Established: 2022; 4 years ago
- Affiliations: Rajasthan University of Health Sciences, NMC
- Dean: Dr. B. L. Chopra
- Location: Suratgarh road, Govt. Hospital, Sri Ganganagar, Rajasthan 335001, Sri Ganganagar, Rajasthan, India; 29.902064°N 73.875012°E
- Website: Official Website
- Location within Rajasthan Location within India

Sri Ganganagar Medical College, also known as GMC Sri Ganganagar, is a government-funded medical college located in Ganganagar, Rajasthan. It was founded in 2022 and is affiliated with the Rajasthan University of Health Sciences. The college is approved by the National Medical Commission.

== Overview ==
It offers an undergraduate MBBS program and have 100 seat for MBBS.

== Academics ==
The MBBS degree takes four and a half years to complete, followed by a year of a Compulsory Rotating Medical Internship The school follows the semester system.

The MBBS degree certificate is awarded by the Rajasthan University of Health Sciences. Students are then given a registration certificate by the Rajasthan Medical Council and enrolled in the register of the Medical Council of India. They are then legally allowed to practice medicine in India .
