= Gajsinghpur =

- Town
- Location in Rajasthan, India Gajsinghpur (India)
- Coordinates: 29.67°N 73.45°E
- Country: India
- State: Rajasthan
- District: Sri Ganganagar

Population (2011)
  - Total: 10,001

Languages
  - Official: Hindi
  - Additional official: English
- Time zone: UTC+5:30 (IST)
- PIN: 335024
- ISO 3166 code: RJ-IN
- Vehicle registration: RJ 13

Gajsinghpur is a town near the border area in Sri Ganganagar district in the Indian state of Rajasthan. Census of 2011 is 9995.

== Demographics ==
As of 2011 India census, Gajsinghpur had a population of 9995. Males constitute 52% of the population and females 48%. Gajsinghpur has an average literacy rate of 75%, higher than the national average of 59.5%: male literacy is 81%, and female literacy is 68%. In Gajsinghpur, 10% of the population is under 6 years of age. It is a small agricultural marketplace near the Pakistan border. Popular crops traded here are wheat, cotton, narama and mustard. Land prices are between 4 lakh to 9 lakh per bigga.

== Transportation ==
The Delhi Sarai Rohilla Bikaner Superfast Express is a direct train service (train no. 12455/56) from Delhi Sarai Rohilla railway station to Bikaner via Gajsinghpur.

A few passenger trains from Sri Ganganagar to Suratgarh go via Gajsinghpur. Trains come from Hanumangarh Junction to here.
