= Rajiasar =

Rajiasar Rajiyasar, Rajiyasar Mitha
- village
- Country: India
- State: Rajasthan
- District: Churu

Government
  - Body: Gram Panchayat

Languages
  - Official: Hindi, Rajasthani language
- Time zone: UTC+5:30 (IST)
- PIN: 331505
- Telephone code: +911568
- ISO 3166 code: RJ-IN
- Vehicle registration: RJ-44 series
- Nearest city: Sujangarh
- Lok Sabha constituency: Churu
- Vidhan Sabha constituency: Ratangarh
- Civic agency: Gram Panchayat
- Climate: Summer, Winter (Köppen)

Rajiasar Meetha is a cluster of three villages located in the Churu district of Rajasthan.
