= Karanpur =

Karanpur Sri Karanpur
- Town
- Location in Rajasthan, India Karanpur (India)
- Coordinates: 29.8414°N 73.4547°E
- Country: India
- State: Rajasthan
- District: Sri Ganganagar
- Elevation: 185 m (607 ft)

Population (2001)
  - Total: 20,694

Languages
  - Official: Hindi
  - Additional official: = English
- Time zone: UTC+5:30 (IST)
- PIN: 335073

Sri Karanpur is a town and a municipality, just 55 km from Sri Ganganagar city in Sri Ganganagar district in the Indian state of Rajasthan.

== Geography ==
Sri Karanpur is located at 29.8414°N 73.4547°E. It has an average elevation of 185 metres (606 feet).

== Demographics ==
As of the 2001 Census of India, Sri Karanpur had a population of 20,694. Males constitute 53% of the population and females constitute 47%. Karanpur has an average literacy rate of 64%, higher than the national average of 59.5%: male literacy is 71%, and female literacy is 56%. In Karanpur, 14% of the population is under 6 years of age. Major languages spoken there are Rajasthani and Bagri.

== Economy ==
Sri Karanpur once produced high quality cotton in India and attracted Birlas to set up a mill which still exists today in the town. However, after 1995 people shifted to other cash crops. Today, the primary cash crop of the area is kinnow, which is exported to West Asia.

Sri Karanpur, also known as Mandi Karanpur, is famous for dealing various crops such as cotton, barley and wheat. The old Mandi is now a Bazaar for cloths, Bus Transporters, jewelers, restaurants, Retail plus Wholesale Medical Stores, Pharmaceutical Medicine Company and Sweet shops.
