= Suratgarh tehsil =

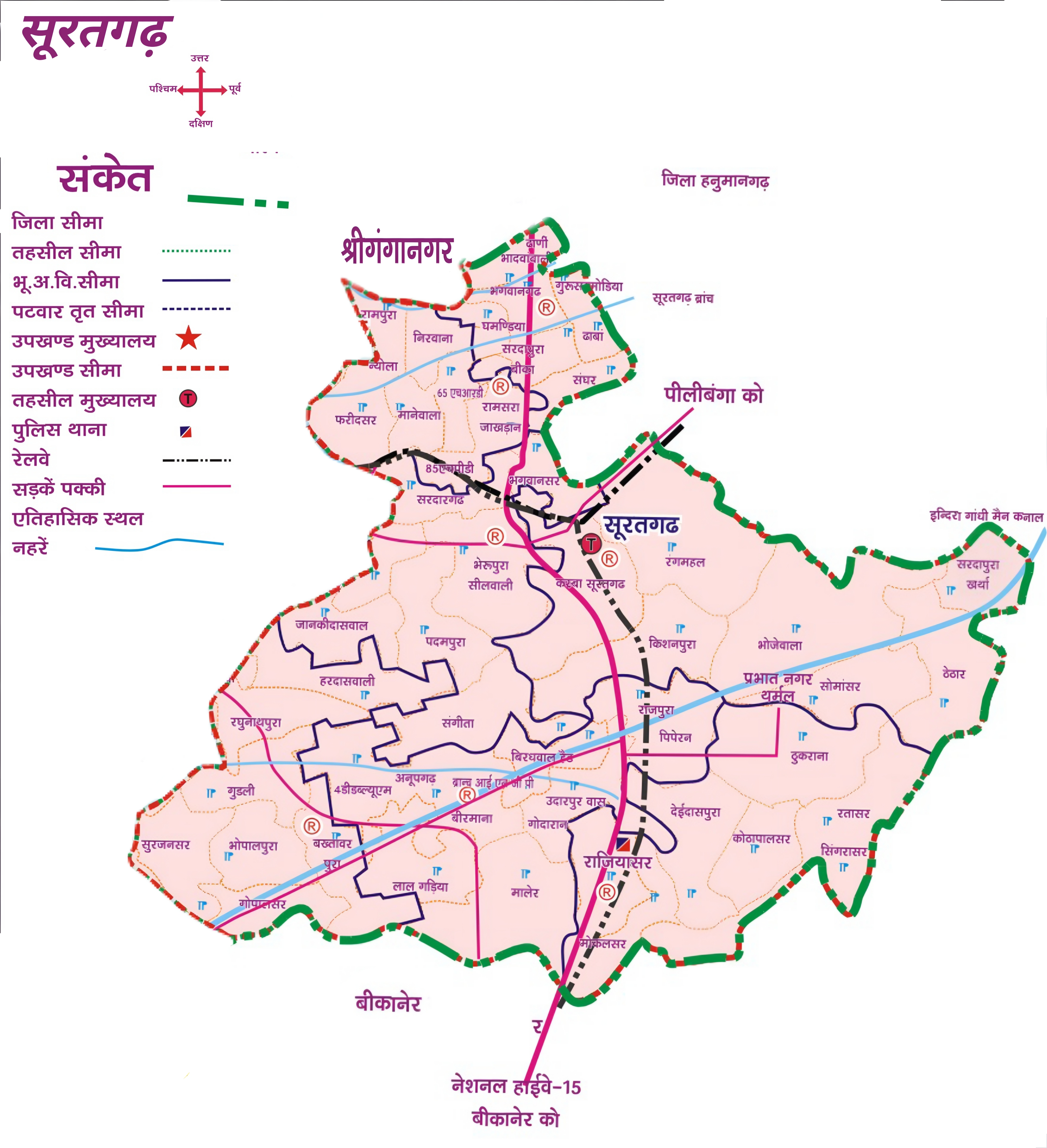
Suratgarh tehsil major village with patwar circle boundary

Suratgarh tehsil is the largest administrative region (tehsil) in the Ganganagar district.

Suratgarh hosts Tehsil headquarters, an SDO headquarter, Block offices including Health and education department and a panchayat samiti headquarter.

== Geography ==
It is bordered on the north by Padampur tehsil, on the west by Vijaynagar tehsil and Raisinghnagar tehsil, on the south by Bikaner district, and on the east by Hanumangarh district.

Suratgarh tehsil is located in the Thar Desert. The seasonal Ghaggar-Hakra River runs in the northern area of the tehsil and the south region is called Uncha Tibba. The Indira Gandhi Canal crosses the tehsil.

There is a sub-tehsil in suratgarh tehsil is Rajiasar.

Suratgarh Tehsil divided into 15 ILR and 60 Patwar circle.

Rang Mahal, Dhaban (15 Lks), Sardargarh (11 SGM), Birmana (3 BMM), Peepasar (Rajiasar Station), Ramsara Jakhran (20 Stb), Ghamandia (6 Gmd), Nirbana (3 Nrd), Raghunathpura (4 Rm), Thukrana, Sanghar (10 Sgr), Manewala (2 Mnwm), Gurusar Modia (26 Mod), Bhagwansar (2 Sgm) are major villages in Suratgarh tehsil.

Suratgarh tehsil is divided into 63 Gram Panchayats and 2 Panchayat Samitis (Suratgarh & Rajiasar). Suratgarh Panchayat Samiti's total 36 Gram Panchayats are divided into 23 Zones and Rajiasar Panchayat Samiti's total 27 Gram Panchayats are divided into 15 Zones.

== Languages ==
Languages of Suratgarh tehsil (2011 census)
1. Bagri(Rajsthani) (71.5%)
2. Punjabi (16.1%)
3. Hindi (7.86%)
4. Marwari(Rajasthani) (0.69%)
5. Others (3.86%)

At the time of the 2011 census, Suratgarh's total population was 320,981. Of which, 71.54% of the population spoke Bagri, 16.05% Punjabi, 7.86% Hindi, and 0.69% Marwari as their first language.
