= Raisinghnagar tehsil =

Raisinghnagar Tehsil
- Tehsil
- Raisinghnagar Tehsil
- Map Location in SriGanga Nagardistrict, Rajasthan, India
- Country: India
- State: Rajasthan
- District: SriGanga Nagar district
- Headquarters: Raisinghnagar

Population (2001)
  - Total: 185,070

Languages

Raisinghnagar Tehsil is a tehsil of SriGanga Nagar district, Rajasthan, India. It is in the central-western area of the district. Raisinghnagar is the headquarters of the tehsil. Sameja and Muklawa are Sub Tehsil in Raisinghnagar

== Geography ==
Raisinghnagar Tehsil is bordered by Karanpur Tehsil to the north, by Padampur Tehsil to the north and northeast, by Suratgarh Tehsil to the east, by Vijaynagar Tehsil to the southeast and south, by Anupgarh Tehsil to the south, and Bahawalnagar District of Pakistani Punjab to the west. The waters of the Bikaner branch of the Gang Canal (Gana Canal) irrigate the farms of this tehsil.

== Demographics ==
In the 2001 India census, Raisinghnagar Tehsil had 185,070 inhabitants, 97,197 (52.5%) males and 87,873 (47.5%) females, for a gender ratio of 904 females per thousand males.

Hindi, Punjabi and Bagri (a dialect of the Rajasthani language) are spoken.

Sameja (17Ptd), Muklawa (17 Tk), Kikarwali (60Rb), Dabla (5Np), Thandi (21/23Np) and Kararwali (8Np) are major villages.

== Places of interest ==
- Historical Gurudwara Buddha Johad – a large gurudwara. This is the place where Bhai Sukha Singh and Mehtab Singh brought the head of Massa Rangarh (guilty of sacrilege of Amritsar Golden temple) and hung it on a tree on 11 August 1740.
- The Raisinghnagar has a famous Shiv Mandir (Temple) and Singh Sabha Gurdwara.
- Raisinghnagar Tehsil has a famous Tripura Sundari Mata Mandir, (Rajasthan 1st Temple) in Shri Dharam Sangh Sanskrit Mahavidhayal, village kikarwalee, Village 24 P.S., Gajsinghpura Road, in Raisinghnagar.
- Romana park
- Guru HarKrishan Public School 11 PS Raisinghnagar - Founded by S. Suhel Singh 26 PS, and the Incumbent Chairman is Baldev Brar and Treasurer is Sehajpreet Singh.
- Bishnoi Mandir & Amrita Devi Park - Dabla

== See also ==
- Kikarwali
- Mihir Parsons was born and raised here.
