= Raisinghnagar =

Raisinghnagar Rai Singh Nagar
- City
- Nickname: RSNR
- Location in Rajasthan, India Raisinghnagar (India)
- Coordinates: 29°32′3.09″N 73°26′51.65″E
- Country: India
- State: Rajasthan
- District: SriGanga Nagar
- Founder: Raja Rai Singh Ji

Government
- Elevation: 160 m (520 ft)

Population (2022)
  - Total: 37,000
- Time zone: UTC+5:30 (IST)
- PIN: 335051
- Telephone code: 01507
- Vehicle registration: RJ 13

Raisinghnagar is a town and a municipality (Tehsil) in SriGanga Nagar district in the Indian state of Rajasthan.

It also corresponds to the Raisinghnagar constituency in the Rajasthan Assembly.

Earlier Raisinghnagar was known as Panwarsar. It is located 200 km North-west of Bikaner and about 465 km from the capital of India, Delhi. The town is located at a distance of only 10 km from the India-Pakistan border.

District headquarters SriGanga Nagar in the Northwest direction at approximately 70 km, small town named Gajsinghpur is north approximately 13 km. Vijaynagar town is in south direction approximately 30 km, Sri Ganganagar city is approximately 70 in the Northeast direction.

== Demography ==
In the 2011 India census, the town of Raisinghnagar had a population of 28,330. Males constituted 53.25% (15085) of the population and females 46.75% (13245). In 2011, Raisinghnagar had an average literacy rate of above 72.08% (20423).

== Language ==
Language in Raisinghnagar(2022 estimate)
Language	Percent
Hindi	45.4%
Punjabi	31.4%
Bagri	26.3%
Rajasthani	14.1%
English	0.2%
Marwari	8.0%

== Economy ==
The economy of Raisinghnagar is dependent on agriculture in the surrounding area.

== Climate ==
The climate of Raisinghnagar varies to extreme limits. The summer temperature reaches up to 50 °C and winter temperature dips just around −1 °C. The average annual rainfall is above 40 centimetres (16 in).
