= Sri Ganganagar district =

- District of Rajasthan
- Location of Sri Ganganagar district in Rajasthan
- Coordinates (Sri Ganganagar): 29°55′04″N 73°52′54″E
- Country: India
- State: Rajasthan
- Division: Bikaner
- Headquarters: Sri Ganganagar
- Tehsils: Sri Ganganagar; Sri Karanpur; Sadulshahar; Padampur; Suratgarh; Gajsinghpur; Vijainagar; Raisinghnagar; Anupgarh; Gharsana; Rawla Mandi

Government
  - District Collector & Magistrate: Manju, IAS
  - Superintendent of Police: Gaurav Yadav, IPS

Demographics
  - Literacy: 69.6
  - Sex ratio: 887
- Time zone: UTC+05:30 (IST)
- Vehicle registration: RJ13, RJ56, RJ62
- Major highways: NH 62 (Old 15)
- Website: sriganganagar.rajasthan.gov.in

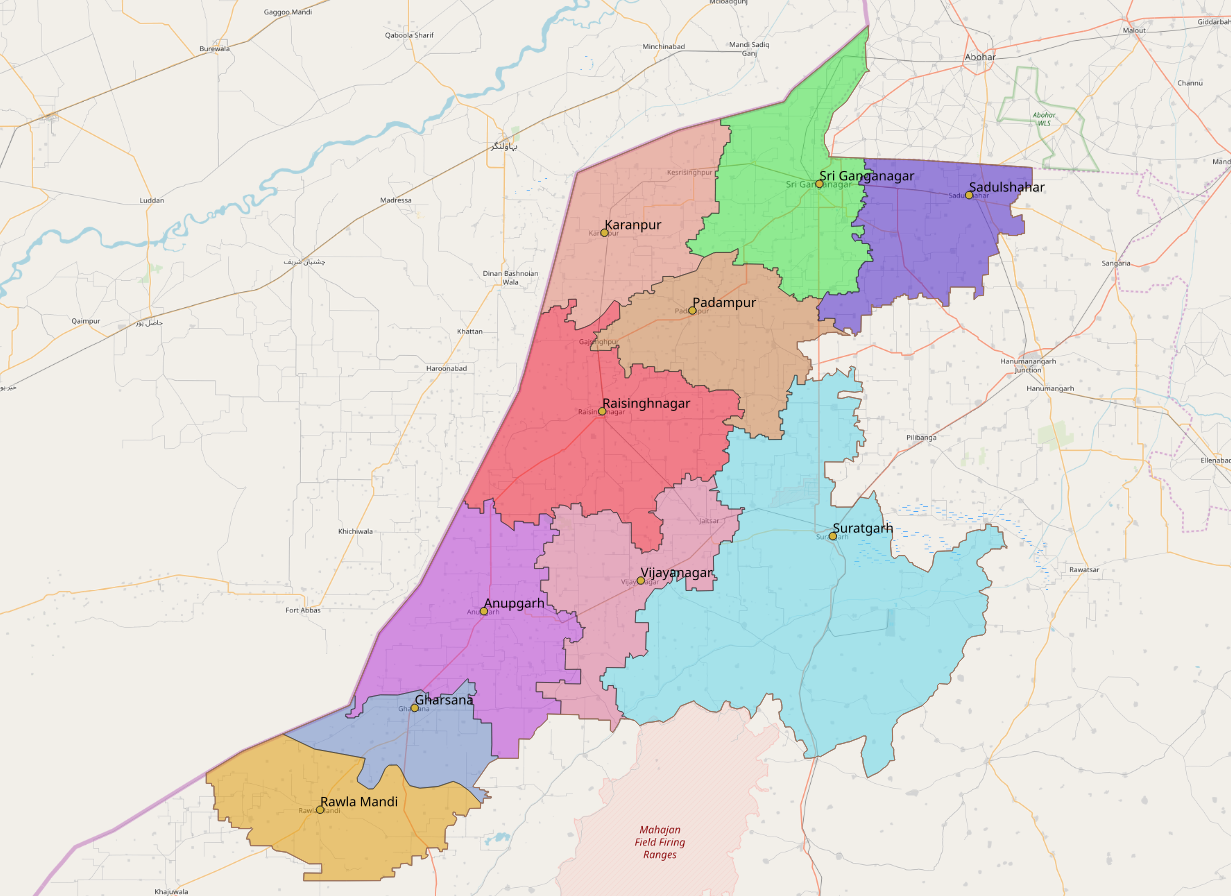
Map of Sri Ganganagar with all Tehsils

Sri Ganganagar district is the northernmost district of Rajasthan state of India. The district headquarters is Sri Ganganagar.

== History ==
Named after Maharaja Ganga Singh of Bikaner, Sri Ganganagar district was part of Bikaner state. This was a mostly uninhabited region. The history of this district is testimony to the vision and efforts of Maharaja Ganga Singh, who visualised and built the Ganga Canal after the Indian famine of 1899–1900. The waters of the Sutlej River were brought into the region through the 89-mile long Gang Canal in 1927, turning this region into a "Food Basket" of Rajasthan.

== Geography ==
=== Location and area ===
Sri Ganganagar district is located between Latitude 28.4 to 30.6 and Longitude 72.2 to 75.3 The total area of Sri Ganganagar is 11,154.66 km^{2} or 1,115,466 hectares. It is surrounded on the east by Hanumangarh district, (Hanumangarh district was carved out of it on 12 July 1994) on the south west by Anupgarh, (Anupgarh district was carved out of it on 7 August 2023 and Re-Merged on 29 December 2024 in it) on the south by Bikaner district, and on the west by Bahawalnagar district of Pakistani Punjab and on the north by Fazilika district of Indian Punjab.

== Demographics ==
Historical population
Year	Pop.	±% p.a.
1901	84,281	—
1911	121,077	+3.69%
1921	100,233	−1.87%
1931	202,964	+7.31%
1941	313,741	+4.45%
1951	370,238	+1.67%
1961	604,901	+5.03%
1971	732,152	+1.93%
1981	1,084,161	+4.00%
1991	1,402,444	+2.61%
2001	1,789,423	+2.47%
2011	1,969,168	+0.96%

According to the 2011 census Sri Ganganagar district has a population of 1,969,168, roughly equal to the nation of Slovenia or the US state of New Mexico. This gives it a ranking of 235th in India (out of a total of 640). The district has a population density of 179 inhabitants per square kilometre (460/sq mi) . Its population growth rate over the decade 2001-2011 was 10.06%. Ganganagar has a sex ratio of 887 females for every 1000 males, and a literacy rate of 70.25%. 27.19% of the population lives in urban areas. Scheduled Castes and Scheduled Tribes make up 36.58% and 0.68% of the population respectively.

After bifurcation of Sri Ganganagar district into Sri Ganganagar and Anupgarh districts, the residual district had a population of 1,270,690. The residual district had a sex ratio of 881 females per 1000 males. 420,513 (33.09%) lived in urban areas. Scheduled Castes and Scheduled Tribes made up 412,468 (32.46%) and 9,717 (0.76%) of the population respectively.

=== Religion ===
Religion in Sri Ganganagar district (2011)
Religion	Percent
Hinduism	74.13%
Sikhism	22.59%
Islam	2.90%
Other or not stated	0.38%

According to the 2011 Indian census, Hinduism is the dominant religion of the district, followed by a large Sikh population, along few followers of Islam.

=== Languages ===
Languages of Sri Ganganagar district (2011 census)
1. Punjabi (31.7%)
2. Bagri (25.1%)
3. Rajasthani (24.2%)
4. Hindi (13.0%)
5. Marwari (2.11%)
6. Saraiki (0.18%)
7. Others (3.73%)

At the time of the 2011 census of India, 31.66% of the population spoke Punjabi, 25.08% Bagri, 24.22% Rajasthani, 13.02% Hindi, 2.11% Marwari and 0.18% Saraiki as their first language.

== Health ==
The table below shows the data from the district nutrition profile of children below the age of 5 years, in Ganganagar, as of year 2020.

District nutrition profile of children under 5 years of age in Ganganagar, year 2020
Indicators	Number of children (<5 years)	Percent (2020)	Percent (2016)
Stunted	49,628	24%	29%
Wasted	50,440	25%	21%
Severely wasted	21,953	12%	6%
Underweight	52,915	26%	29%
Overweight/obesity	9,171	5%	2%
Anemia	131,775	72%	40%
Total children	202,895		

The table below shows the district nutrition profile of Ganganagar of women between the ages of 15 and 49 years, as of year 2020.

District nutritional profile of Ganganagar of women of 15–49 years, in 2020
Indicators	Number of women (15–49 years)	Percent (2020)	Percent (2016)
Underweight (BMI <18.5 kg/m^2)	90,716	14%	21%
Overweight/obesity	123,301	19%	20%
Hypertension	102,824	16%	14%
Diabetes	60,478	10%	NA
Anemia (non-preg)	372,691	59%	35%
Anemia (preg)	23,429	64%	38%
Total women (preg)	36,466		
Total women	633,936		

== Administration ==
=== Tehsils in Ganganagar ===
There are following Eleven tehsils in Ganganagar district (DTO RJ13).

1. Sri Ganganagar
2. Sri Karanpur, headquarters in the town of Karanpur
3. Sadulshahar DTO Code RJ56
4. Padampur
5. Suratgarh
6. Anupgarh tehsil headquarters in the town of Anupgarh DTO Code RJ62
7. Sri Bijaynagar headquarters in the town of Vijainagar
8. Gharsana tehsil headquarters in the town of Gharsana
9. Raisinghnagar tehsil headquarters in the town of Raisinghnagar
10. Gajsinghpur
11. Rawla Mandi

There are also 12 sub-tehsils in Ganganagar district are Lalgarh Jattan, Hindumalkot, Chunawadh, Mirzawala, Binjhbayla, Ridmalsar, Rajiasar, Jaitsar, 365 Head (2KLD), Kesrisinghpur, Muklawa, Sameja.

Thera are 9 SDO ( Sub Division Offices) in Ganganagar, Sadulsahar, Karanpur, Padampur, Raisinghnagar, Vijainagar, Anupgarh, Gharsana and Suratgarh.

It has one municipal council in Ganganagar city and 10 municipal boards are in Suratgarh, Sadulshahar, Padampur, Karanpur, Gajsinghpur, Kesrisinghpur, Raisinghnagar, Vijainagar, Anupgarh and Gharsana.

There are total 409 Gram Panchayats in Sri Ganganagar district. Ganganagar has a total of 3061 big and small villages which are the highest in Rajasthan

=== Major towns and villages ===
Other major towns and villages include Kesrisinghpur, Gajsinghpur, Suratgarh, Sri Gurusar Modia (26 Mod), Rang Mahal, Dhaban (15 Lks), Muklawa (17 Tk), Sameja (15 Ptd), Dullapur Keri (5 D), Sadhuwali (1 d chhoti), Chunawad (30 GG), Netewala (2 Hh), Ganeshgarh, Lalgarh Jattan, Manniwali, Hindumalkot (7 B), Kaliya (3 G), Khatlabana (2 F), Jaitsar (1 Gb), Binjhbayla, Narsinghpura, Mahiyawali, Sardargarh etc.

There are 11 Panchayat Samitis in SGNR are

1. Suratgarh
2. Padampur
3. Karanpur
4. Sadulshahar
5. Ganganagar North
6. Raisinghnagar
7. Vijainagar
8. Anupgarh
9. Gharsana
10. Ganganagar South
11. Rajiasar

== Famous places ==
1. Rang Mahal
2. Shivpur Head - Shivpur Fatuhi
3. Airforce Suratgarh
4. Thermal Power Plant Super Critical Suratgarh
5. All India Radio Station Suratgarh
6. Central Farm Suratgarh, Jaitsar, Sardargarh
7. CCBF Suratgarh
8. Shree Cement Udaipur Suratgarh
9. Koni Village Border
10. Hindumalkot Border
11. Padpata Dhaam Dhaban Jhallar
12. Chanana Dham - 4NN Chanana
13. Hathiyawala Dham
14. Suratgarh Sodhal Fort
15. Dhab Suratgarh
16. Anupgarh Fort
17. Shivpuri (29GB) Fort

== Media ==
The district has editions of state level newspapers from Jaipur, which are re-published from Ganganagar and Raisinghnagar.

"Air Suratgarh", a radio station, broadcasts programmes in Hindi, Rajasthani and Punjabi languages. It was commissioned in 1981 and broadcasts on the 918 kHz frequency.
