= Anupgarh =

Town in Rajasthan, India

Anupgarh Chugher (old name)
- Town
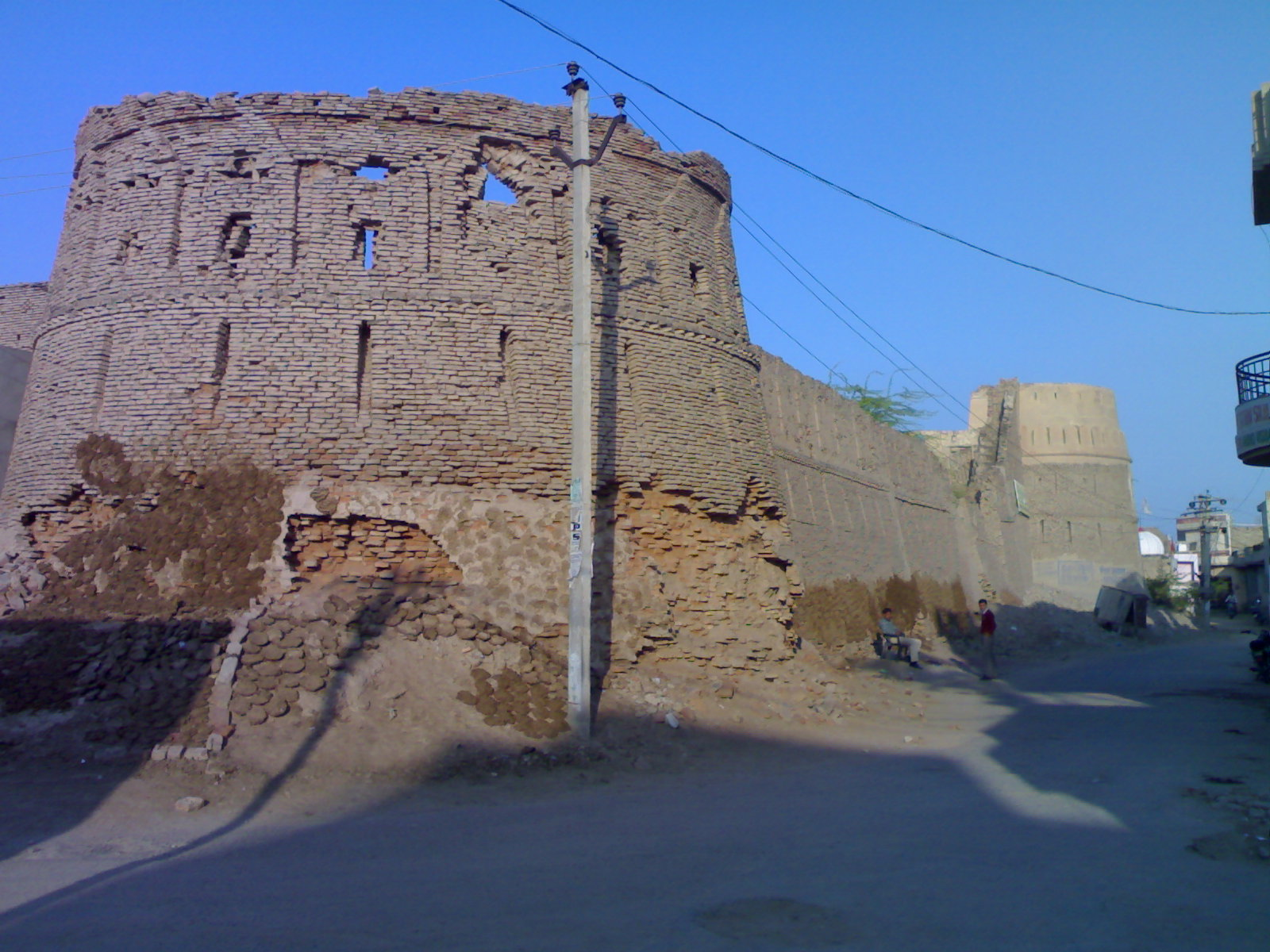
- Anupgarh Fort is located in the town of Anupgarh, Rajasthan, India
- Nickname: APH
- Location in Rajasthan, India Anupgarh (India)
- Coordinates: 29°11′22″N 73°12′30″E
- Country: India
- State: Rajasthan
- District: Sri Ganganagar
- Founder: Maharaja Anup Singh

Government
  - Type: State Government
  - Body: Government of Rajasthan

Area
  - Total: 4.68 km^{2} (1.81 sq mi)
- Elevation: 155 m (509 ft)

Population (2011)
  - Total: 30,877
  - Density: 6,598/km^{2} (17,090/sq mi)

Languages
  - Official: Hindi
  - Additional official: English
- Time zone: UTC+5:30 (IST)
- PIN: 335701
- Telephone code: 01498
- ISO 3166 code: RJ-IN
- Vehicle registration: RJ-62

Anupgarh is a town in the Sri Ganganagar district of the state of Rajasthan in India. It is about 123 km from the city of Sri Ganganagar, the district headquarters.

== Geography ==
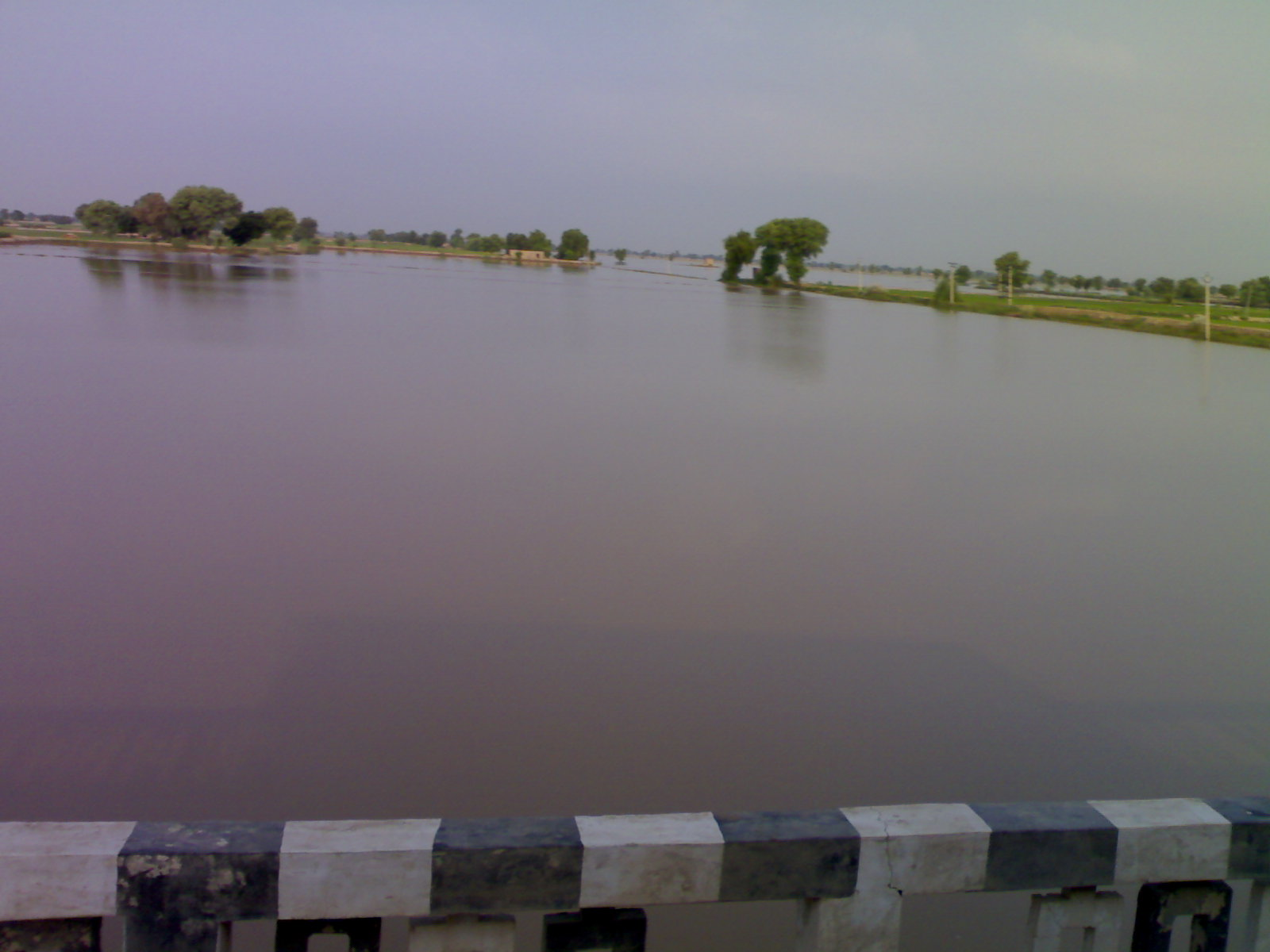
Ghaggar river, near Anupgarh, in the month of September

Anupgarh has an average elevation of 155 metres (508 feet), and is very close to the border with Pakistan. The fort at Anupgarh was built about 1689 by the Mughal governor to help suppress the local Bhati Rajputs who were rebelling.

== Demographics ==
Religion in Anupgarh (2011 census)
Religion	Percent
Hinduism	79.9%
Sikhism	17.1%
Islam	2.6%
Others	0.02%

In the 2011 census, the town of Anupgarh had a population of 30,877, with male population of 16,343 and female population of 14,534.

In the 2001 India census, the town of Anupgarh had a population of 29,548. Males constituted 54% of the population and females 46%. Anupgarh had an average literacy rate of 61.2%, higher than the national average of 59.5%; with 67.3% of the males and 54.0% of females literate. In 2001 in Anupgarh, 15.6% of the population was under six years of age.

Hindus are in majority in the town, followed by a significant Sikh minority, followed by a small Muslim population.

== Notable places ==
- Laila Majnu Ki Mazar, a shrine
