= Sri Ganganagar =

- City
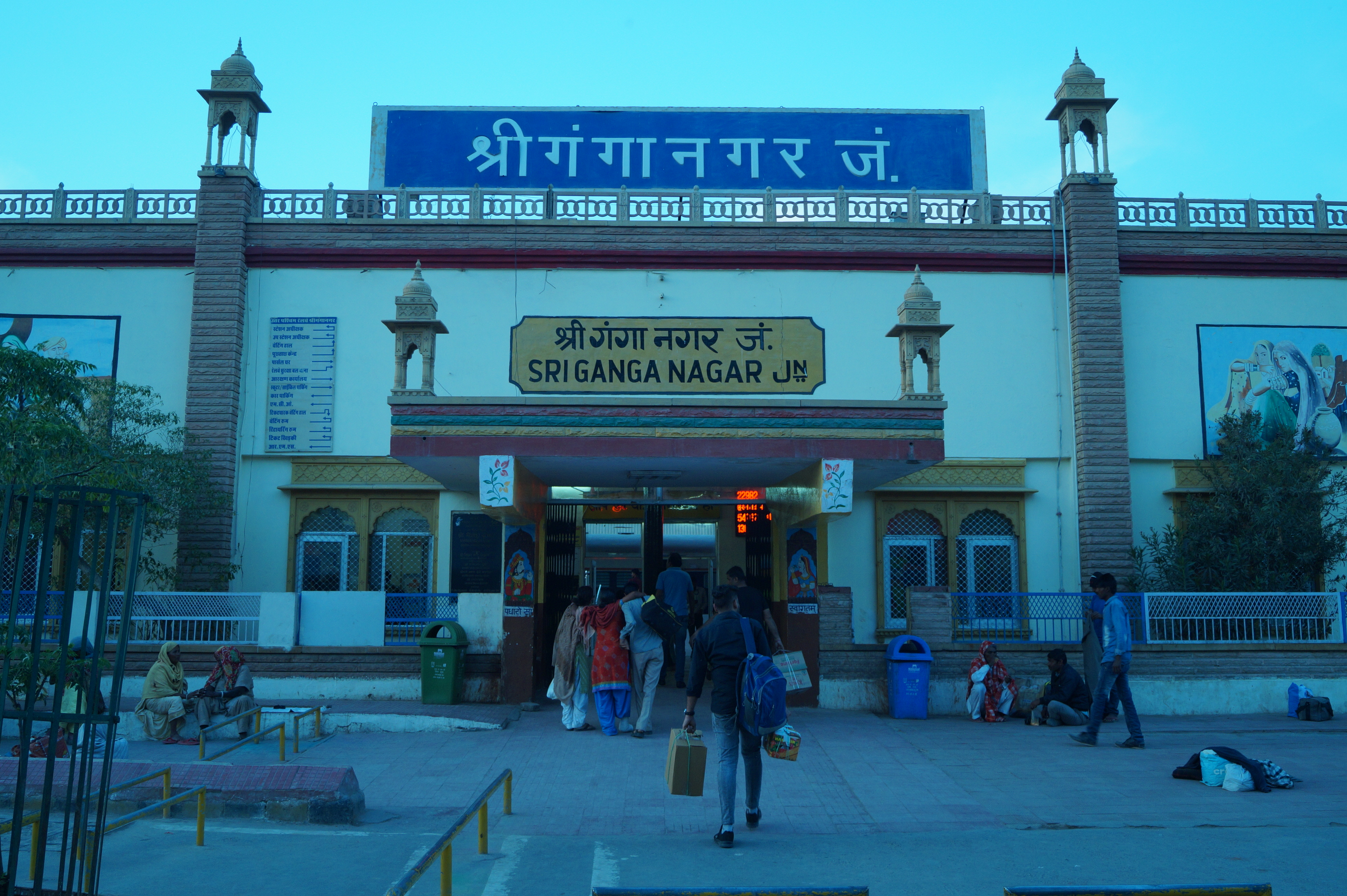
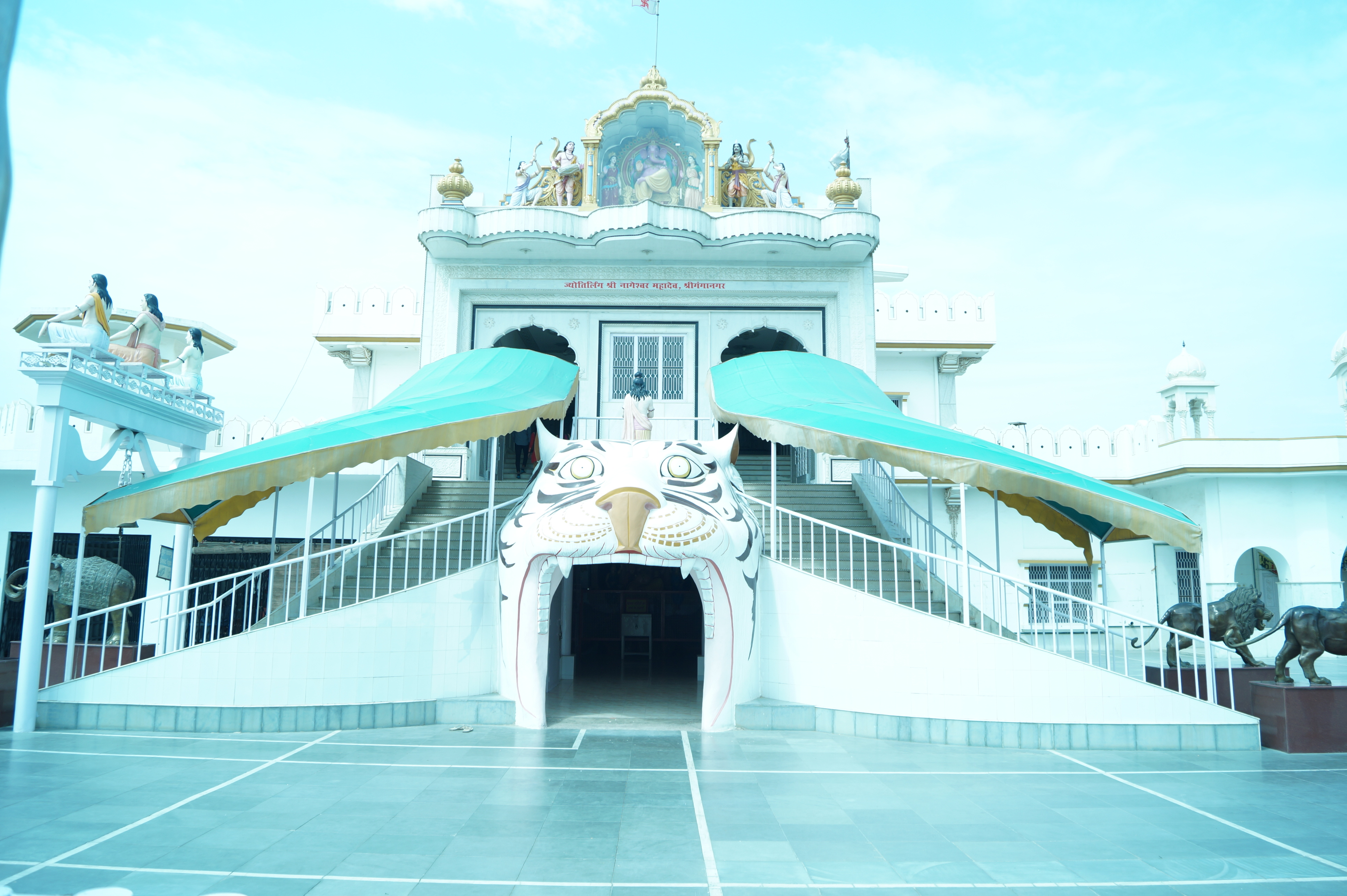
- Sri Ganganagar railway station Shri Nageshwar Mahadev Jyotirling Mandir
- Nickname: Food Basket of Rajasthan
- Location in Rajasthan, India Sri Ganganagar (India)
- Coordinates: 29.92°N 73.88°E
- Country: India
- State: Rajasthan
- District: Sri Ganganagar
- Established: 1927; 99 years ago
- Founder: Ganga Singh
- Named for: Ganga Singh

Government
  - Type: State Government
  - Body: Government of India

Area
  - Total: 43.35 km^{2} (16.74 sq mi)
- Elevation: 178 m (584 ft)
- Highest elevation: 240 m (790 ft)

Population (2011)
  - Total: 237,780
  - Density: 5,485/km^{2} (14,210/sq mi)

Languages
  - Official: Hindi
  - Additional official: English
  - Commonly spoken: See § Languages
- Time zone: UTC+5:30 (IST)
- PIN: 335001
- Telephone code: 0154 / +91-154
- ISO 3166 code: RJ-IN
- Vehicle registration: RJ-13 , RJ-56
- Sex ratio: 947 ♂/♀
- Website: sriganganagar.rajasthan.gov.in

Sri Ganganagar is a city in the northernmost part of the Indian state of Rajasthan, located near the international border with Pakistan. It is the administrative headquarters of Sri Ganganagar district. The city was established by the Maharaja Ganga Singh of Bikaner State, who introduced canal irrigation to this arid region. The city is named after him. With the construction of the Gang Canal and later the Bhakra irrigation system, the area was transformed from arid land into fertile fields, leading to its description as the "food basket of Rajasthan".

== History ==
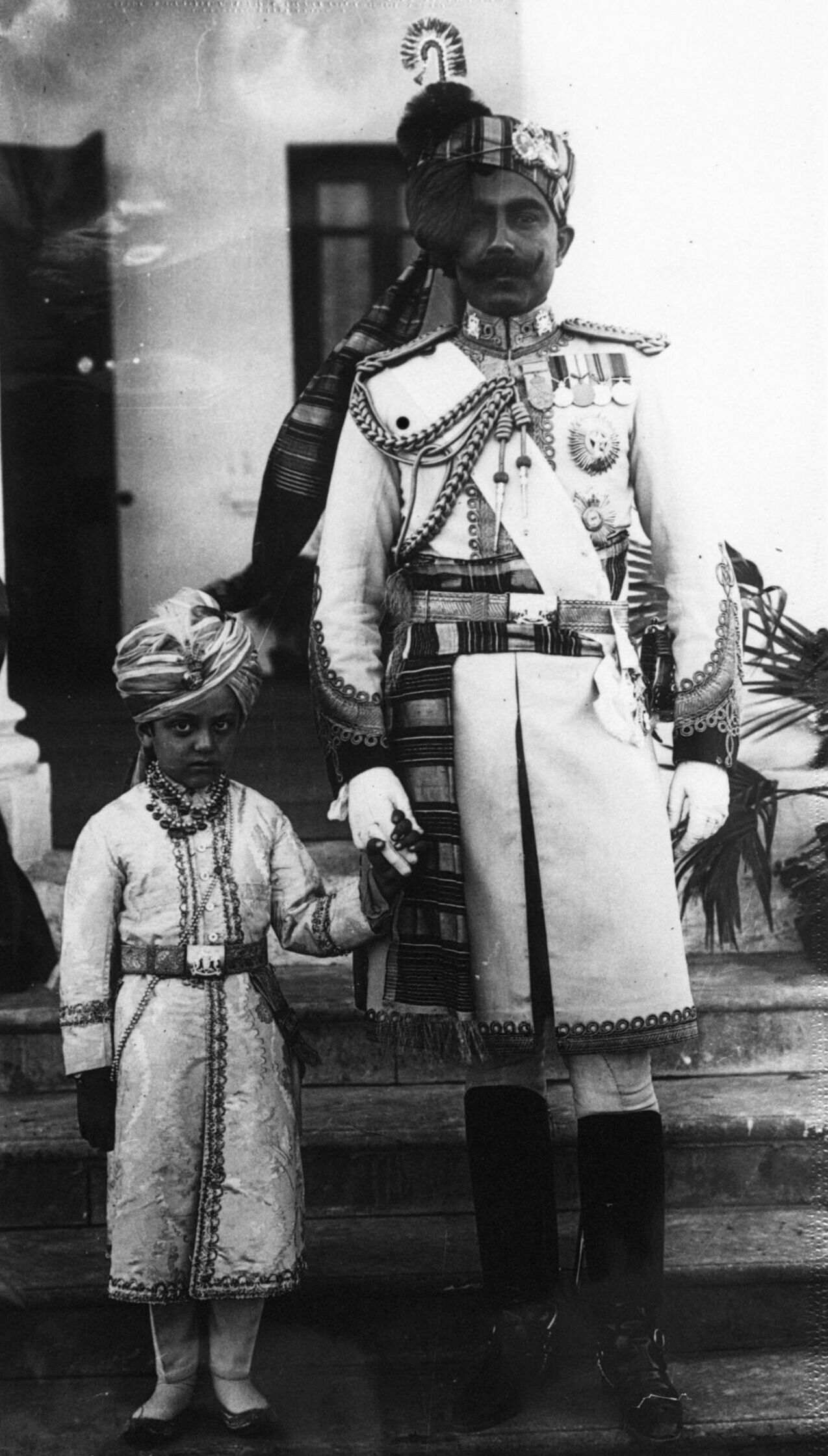
Maharaja Ganga Singh, with Prince Rafiqullah Khan of Bhopal (grandson of Queen Sultan Jahan I of Bhopal) in 1914.

The area comprising the present Sri Ganganagar district has been a part of the erstwhile Bikaner State of former Rajputana. Sri Ganganagar was established by Maharaja Ganga Singh. Sri Ganganagar is one of the first well-planned modern cities of India. It is divided into residential blocks and a commercial area which includes an agricultural marketplace.

It is located at the point where the Sutlej River enters Rajasthan and the former Bikaner State. This area first came under the jurisdiction of Bahawalpur state, but the area was unguarded, and Hindu Mal, a companion of Maharaja Ganga Singh, took advantage of this opportunity and moved the posts along the boundary. He started his journey to change posts from Suratgarh in the south, and went until what is now Hindumalkot in the north. He informed the Maharaja about his successful invasion of the area when he reached the northern part and thereafter died, giving name to the city Hindumalkot.

From 1899 to 1900, the Bikaner State was affected by a severe famine. To resolve this issue, Maharaja Ganga Singh obtained the services of A.W.E. Standley, Chief Engineer of Punjab, who demonstrated the feasibility of the western area of the Bikaner State being irrigated by the waters of the Sutlej. The plan of the Sutlej Valley Project was drawn by the chief engineer of Punjab Province, RG Kennedy, according to which the vast area of the Bikaner State could be irrigated. However, the project was delayed due to objections by the state of Bahawalpur.

With the intervention of the Viceroy of India, Lord Curzon in 1906, a Tripartite Conference was held and an agreement was reached on 4 September 1920. The foundation stone of the Canal Head Works at Ferozepur was laid on 5 December 1925 and the work completed in 1927 by constructing 143 km (89 mi) of lined canal. The opening ceremony was performed on 26 October 1927 by Lord Irwin, then Viceroy of India. The city celebrates its foundation on the same day.

The plan for the city of Sri Ganganagar was drawn at this time. Sri Ganganagar district was formed from the irrigated parts of the Bikaner State on 30 March 1949. Part of the district was later split off to form Hanumangarh district in 1994.

== Geography ==
=== Location and area ===
Sri Ganganagar District is between latitudes 28.4 and 30.6 and longitudes 72.2 and 75.3 The total area of Sri Ganganagar is 11,154.66 km^{2} (1,115,466 ha; 4,306.84 sq mi). It is surrounded on the east by Hanumangarh district, (formerly part of Sri Ganganagar district) on the south west by Anupgarh district, (formerly part of Sri Ganganagar district) on the south by Bikaner District, on the west by Bahawalnagar district of the Pakistani Punjab, and on the north by Fazilka district of Indian Punjab.

=== Topography ===
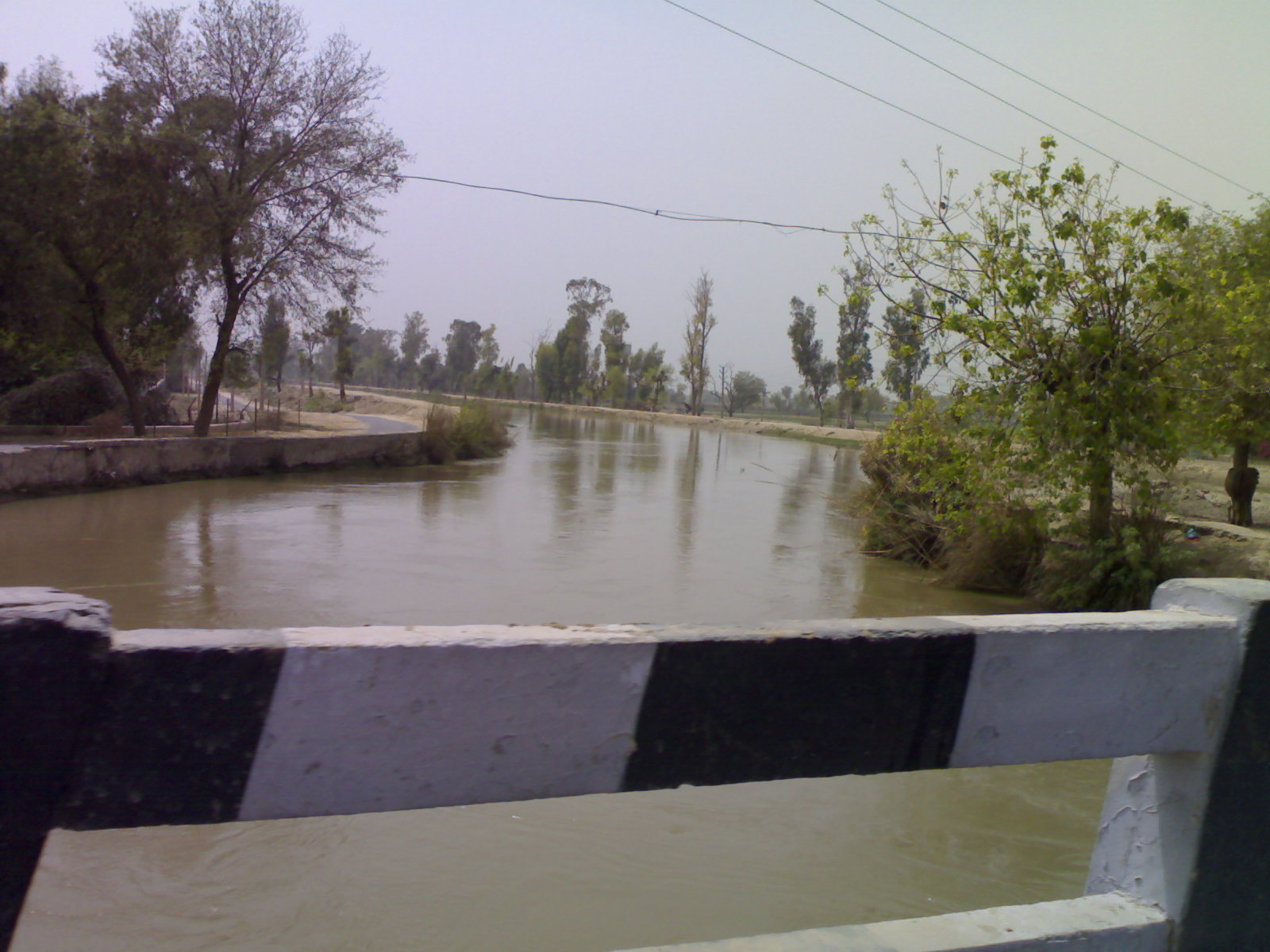
Ganga Canal irrigates the northern-western area of the district; photo taken near Ganganagar city from Ganganagar-Hanumangarh road.

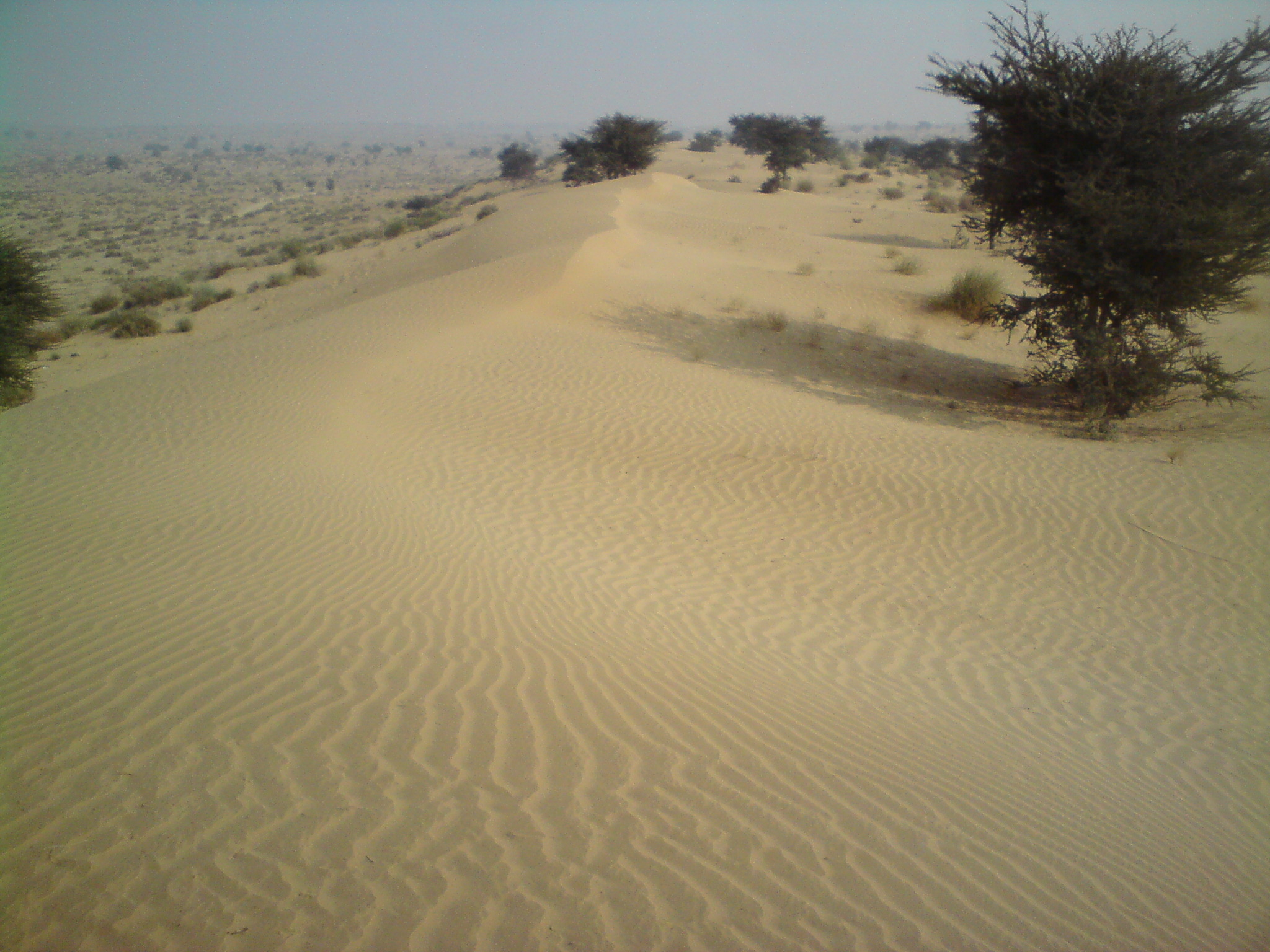
Irrigation has made Ganganagar greener but sandy dunes can still be seen. A photo taken in Gharsana tehsil.

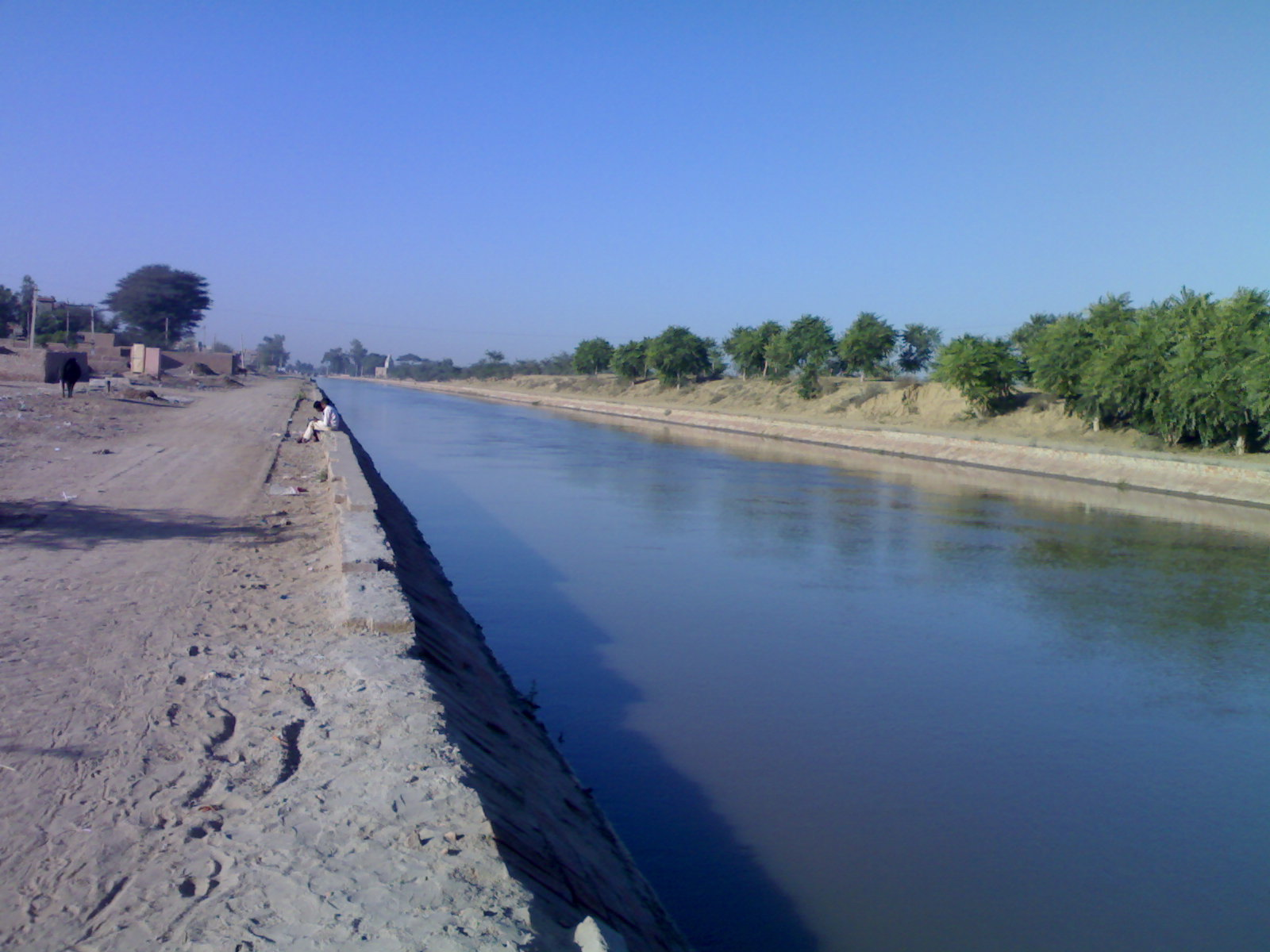
The Anupgarh branch of the IGNP canal is the main source of irrigation in southern tehsils; photo taken in Anupgarh.

Indira Gandhi Canal, the largest canal in India, is located in Sri Ganganagar district.

Although Sri Ganganagar district lies in the Thar Desert, irrigation via the Indira Gandhi and Ganga Canals has changed the flora and fauna. The district can be classified into five geographical regions:

1. The region irrigated by the Ganga Canal and the Bhakra canal tributaries: the northern region, which is 3/4 of the district, resembles the fertile plains of Punjab. Some areas, like the area between the towns of Raisinghnagar and Vijaynagar, have desert-like conditions.
2. Area irrigated by the Suratgarh branch of the IGNP canal
3. Area irrigated by Anoopgarh branch of IGNP canal: it comprises Anoopgarh and Gharsana tehsils. It is the southernmost region of the district, of which much has been converted into plains, but sandy dunes can still be seen.
4. The Naali belt: this is a narrow basin of the Ghaggar river. It is the only major river of the district. It is a seasonal river, which flows in the rainy season. It enters the district near Suratgarh and then flows in areas of Jaitsar, Vijaynagar, Anoopgarh and then crosses the Indo-Pakistani border.
5. The 'Uncha Tibba' (high sandy dunes) area of Suratgarh tehsil: large sandy dunes and lack of water predominate here. This area can be said to be a 'real desert'. People of this area face harsh conditions in the desert.

=== Climate ===
Climate data for Sri Ganganagar (1991–2020, extremes 1937–present)
Month	Jan	Feb	Mar	Apr	May	Jun	Jul	Aug	Sep	Oct	Nov	Dec	Year
Record high °C (°F)	36.1 (97.0)	35.0 (95.0)	42.2 (108.0)	47.0 (116.6)	49.4 (120.9)	48.7 (119.7)	47.8 (118.0)	44.4 (111.9)	43.8 (110.8)	41.3 (106.3)	39.0 (102.2)	31.5 (88.7)	49.4 (120.9)
Mean maximum °C (°F)	25.4 (77.7)	29.3 (84.7)	36.7 (98.1)	43.8 (110.8)	46.8 (116.2)	46.6 (115.9)	43.4 (110.1)	41.3 (106.3)	40.3 (104.5)	39.1 (102.4)	34.4 (93.9)	28.9 (84.0)	46.9 (116.4)
Mean daily maximum °C (°F)	19.9 (67.8)	23.9 (75.0)	30.1 (86.2)	37.3 (99.1)	41.9 (107.4)	41.6 (106.9)	38.9 (102.0)	38.0 (100.4)	36.9 (98.4)	35.2 (95.4)	29.5 (85.1)	23.7 (74.7)	33.2 (91.8)
Daily mean °C (°F)	12.3 (54.1)	16.4 (61.5)	21.9 (71.4)	28.5 (83.3)	33.3 (91.9)	34.4 (93.9)	33.2 (91.8)	31.9 (89.4)	30.3 (86.5)	26.2 (79.2)	19.5 (67.1)	14.0 (57.2)	25.2 (77.3)
Mean daily minimum °C (°F)	5.9 (42.6)	8.8 (47.8)	13.5 (56.3)	19.4 (66.9)	24.9 (76.8)	27.7 (81.9)	28.2 (82.8)	27.4 (81.3)	24.3 (75.7)	18.3 (64.9)	11.5 (52.7)	6.9 (44.4)	18.3 (64.9)
Mean minimum °C (°F)	1.6 (34.9)	3.8 (38.8)	8.3 (46.9)	13.5 (56.3)	19.2 (66.6)	21.1 (70.0)	23.7 (74.7)	24.2 (75.6)	20.2 (68.4)	13.7 (56.7)	7.1 (44.8)	3.0 (37.4)	1.7 (35.1)
Record low °C (°F)	−2.2 (28.0)	−2.8 (27.0)	0.6 (33.1)	6.9 (44.4)	11.7 (53.1)	13.8 (56.8)	14.5 (58.1)	16.2 (61.2)	14.0 (57.2)	10.3 (50.5)	1.7 (35.1)	−1.7 (28.9)	−2.8 (27.0)
Average rainfall mm (inches)	7.7 (0.30)	15.3 (0.60)	14.1 (0.56)	11.7 (0.46)	16.6 (0.65)	53.5 (2.11)	69.7 (2.74)	54.5 (2.15)	59.1 (2.33)	5.0 (0.20)	2.2 (0.09)	2.4 (0.09)	311.9 (12.28)
Average rainy days	0.9	1.4	1.2	1.2	1.4	2.9	3.5	2.9	2.5	0.4	0.3	0.2	18.9
Average relative humidity (%) (at 17:30 IST)	58	49	42	27	24	35	52	56	52	44	50	57	46
Source 1: India Meteorological Department
Source 2: Tokyo Climate Center (mean temperatures 1991–2020)

== Demographics ==
According to the 2011 census Sri Ganganagar city and outgrowths had a population of 237,780. Ganganagar had a sex ratio of 859 females for every 1000 males. Males constitute 53.8% of the population and females 46.2%. Ganganagar had an effective literacy rate of 74.25%: male literacy is 88.03%, and female literacy is 76.23%. In Ganganagar, 19.6% of the population is under 6 years of age.

=== Religion ===
Religion in Sri Ganganagar (2011)
Religion	Percent
Hinduism	86.79%
Sikhism	9.49%
Islam	3.05%
Other or not stated	0.67%
Distribution of religions

Hindus form the majority of town population, followed by minority Sikh and Muslim.

=== Languages ===
Languages of Sri Gangangar (2011)
1. Hindi (41.2%)
2. Punjabi (24.8%)
3. Rajasthani (11.5%)
4. Bagri (9.52%)
5. Marwari (6.00%)
6. Bhojpuri (1.36%)
7. Others (5.70%)

Hindi and English serve as official languages of the city. Punjabi, Hindi, Rajasthani, Bagri and Saraiki are the most commonly spoken languages.

== Government and politics ==
- Member of Parliament: Kuldeep Indora, Indian National Congress.
- Member of Legislative Assembly: Jaydeep Bihani, Bhartiya Janta Party.

== Economy ==
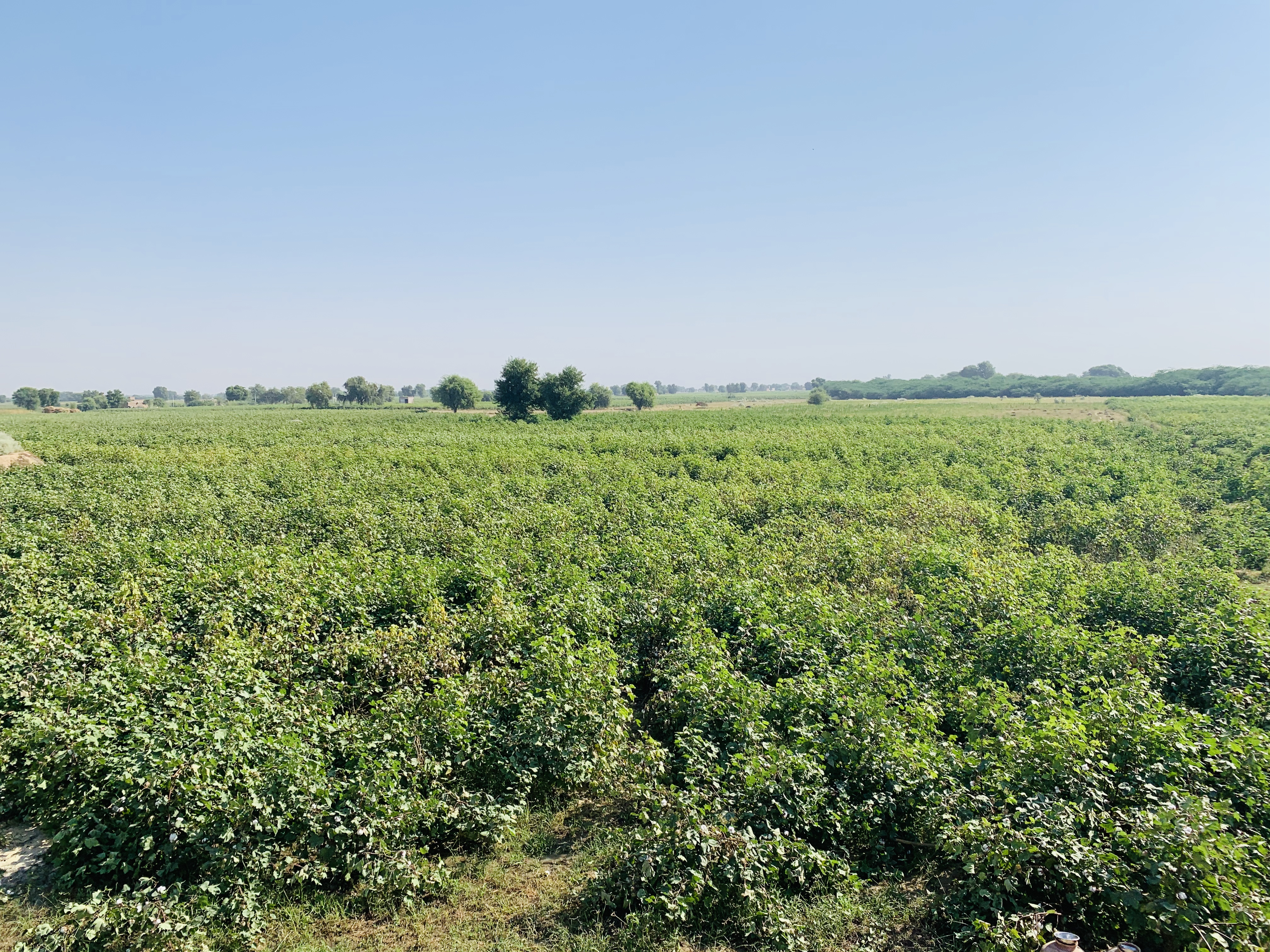
Photo of cotton crop field in Village Banda colony, Anupgarh, Sri Ganganagar,Rajasthan

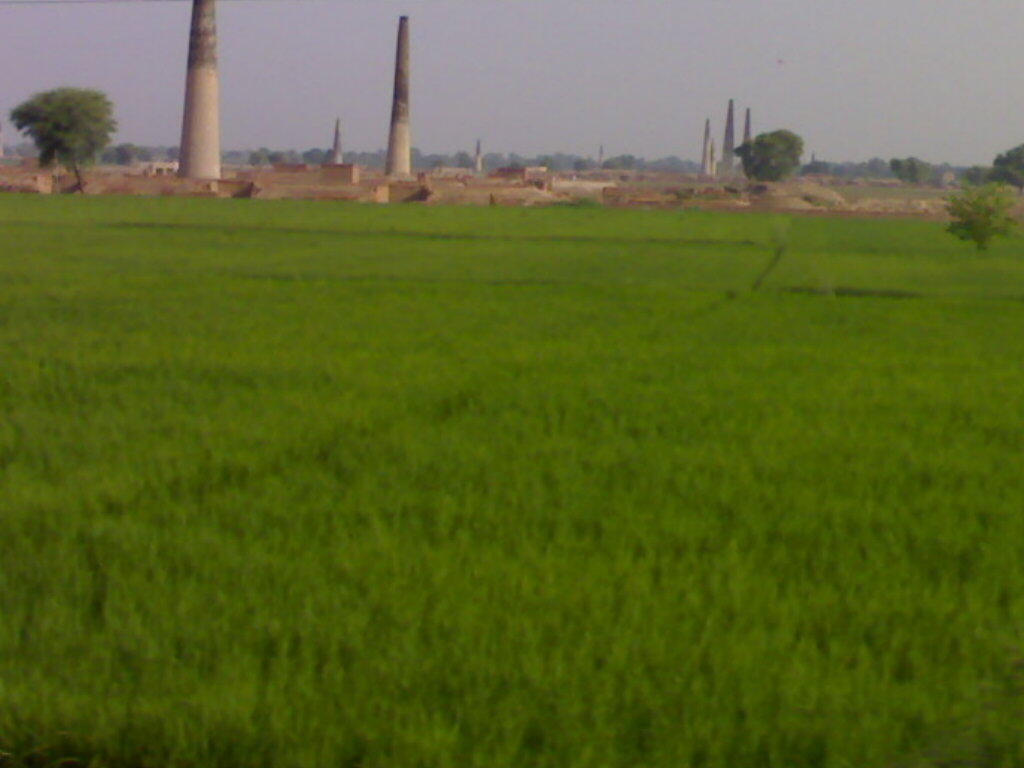
Paddy (Dhaan/Jhona) fields in the Ghaggar river belt and brick industries near Suratgarh.

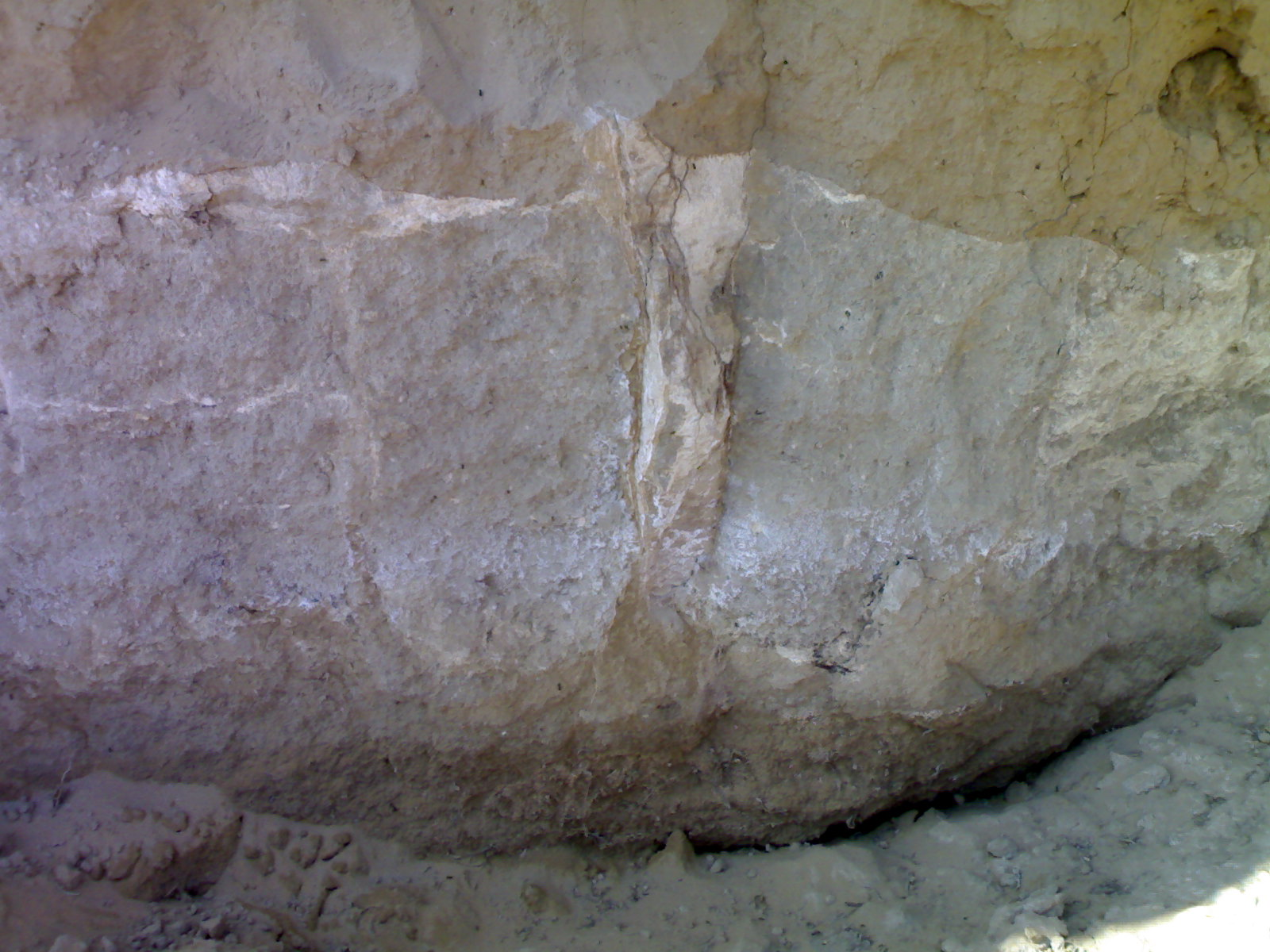
Gypsum is the only mineral, which is mined on a large scale here.

Desert land was converted to a green town by the efforts of Maharaja Ganga Singh, who brought the Ganga Canal. It carries the excess waters of Punjab and Himachal Pradesh to the region.

The economy of the city is based on agriculture; its main crops are wheat, mustard and cotton. Other crops include guar, bajra, sugar cane and grams. In recent years, farmers are diverting towards horticulture. Kinnow (a hybrid citrus fruit) is a popular horticultural product; other fruits of the citrus family are also grown. The city also have the largest carrot market of Rajasthan.

Industries in Sri Ganganagar District are based on agriculture. Major industries are cotton ginning and pressing factories, mustard oil mills, wheat flour mills, and sugar mills. (known for its Royal Heritage Liqueurs),

== Tourist attractions ==
=== Temples and places of worship ===
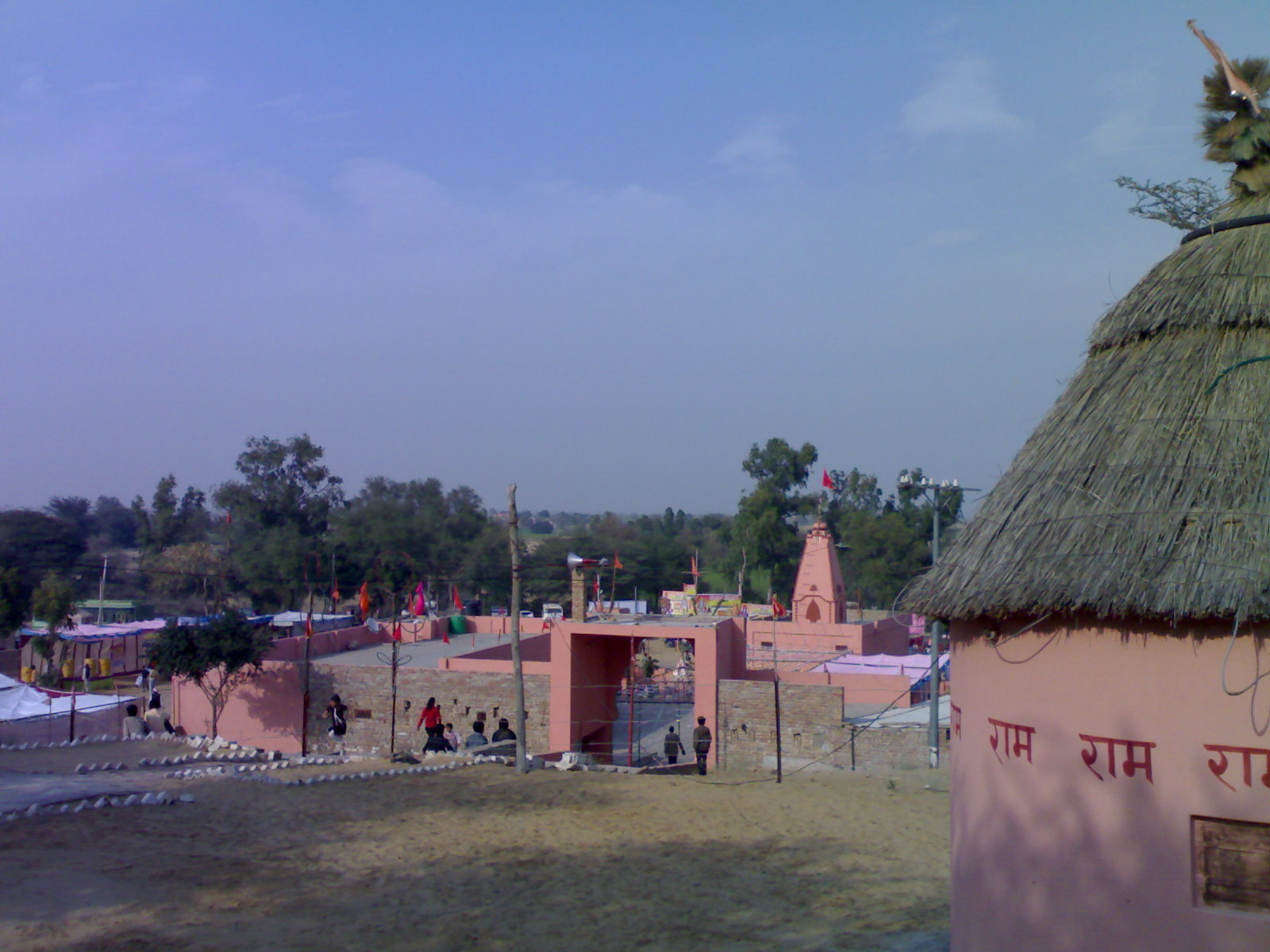
A full view of Rojhri temple complex from Ram Kutia.

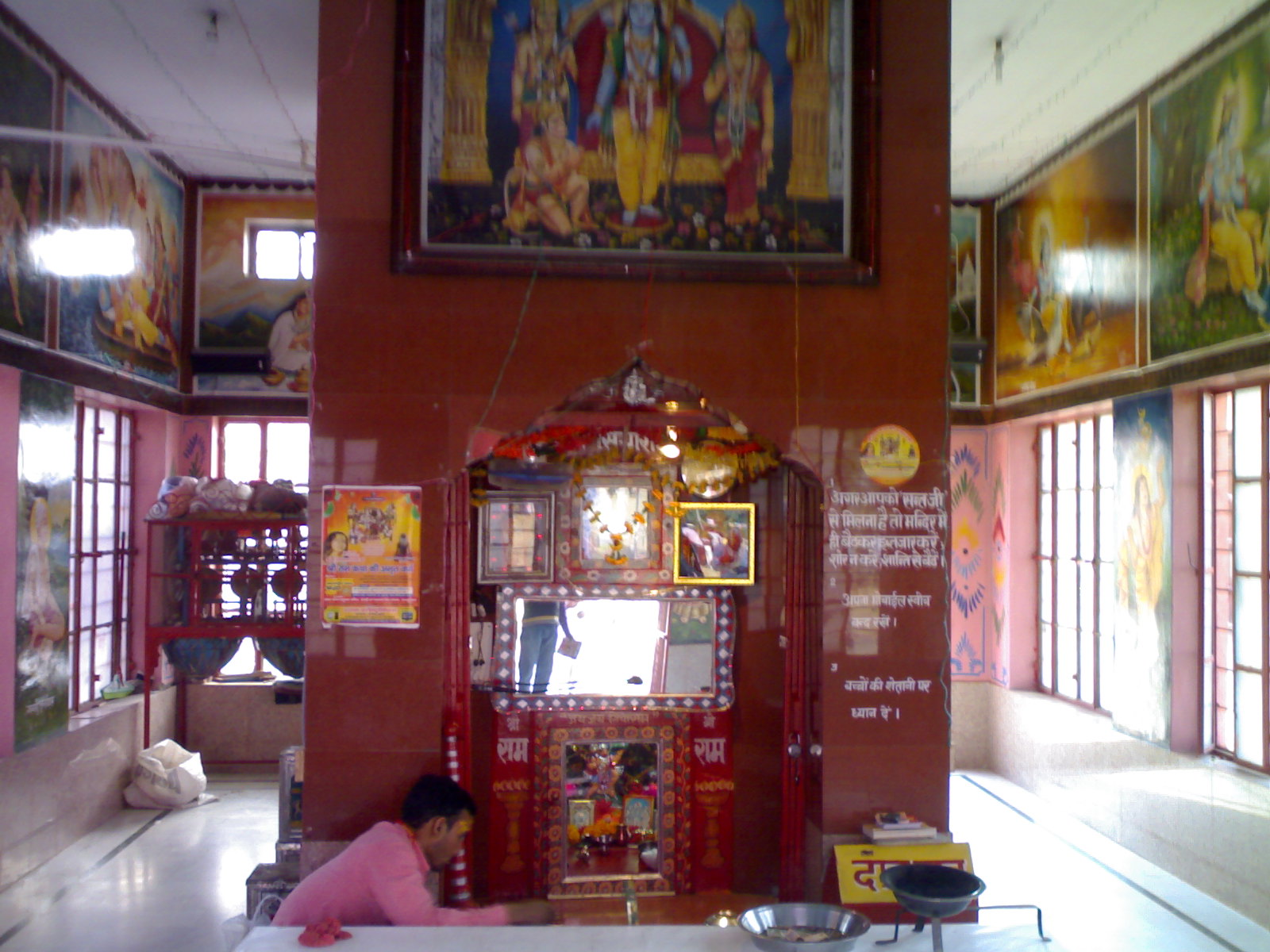
An inside view of Rojhri temple.

- Rojhri Dham is a complex of religious sites dedicated to the worship of the Hindu deity Hanuman. The temple of Hanuman is on the right side of Anupgarh-Bikaner road, about one kilometre from Rojhri Village. It is approximately 55 km (34 mi) from Anupgarh, 22 km (14 mi) from Rawla Mandi, 17 km (11 mi) from Chhatargarh and 185 km (115 mi) south-west of Sri Ganganagar.

== Transport ==
=== By road ===
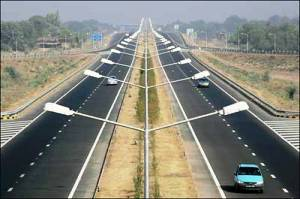
New highway between Sriganganagar and Suratgarh

Sri Ganganagar is well connected with road and is linked directly to Delhi, Jaipur, Ludhiana, Chandigarh, Bikaner, Bathinda, Sirsa, Hisar, Haridwar and many other cities. National Highway 62 passes through Sri Ganganagar. Auto rickshaws and cycle rickshaws are majorly used for local transport in Sri Ganganagar.

=== By rail ===
Sri Ganganagar Junction railway station is a main railway station in Sri Ganganagar District. The city is directly connected to Delhi, Jaipur, Kota, Bikaner, Haridwar, Hanumangarh, Jodhpur, Ambala, Sikar, Bathinda, Firozpur, Fazilka, Howrah, Trivandrum, Nanded, Ahmedabad, Pune, Roorkee, Kanpur, Bangalore and some other cities via train.

=== By air ===
Lalgarh Airport serves as a local airport, with charter service in Sri Ganganagar District.

Sri Guru Ram Das Ji International Airport, Amritsar (241 km) is the nearest international airport.

== Education ==
- Sri Ganganagar Medical College

== Notable people ==
- Iqbal Singh Chahal, Municipal commissioner and administrator of Brihanmumbai Municipal Corporation
- Avtar Singh Cheema, First Indian to climb Mount Everest
- Ravinder Kaushik, former Research and Analysis Wing agent
- Shahid Mallya, Bollywood playback singer
- Major Rajasthani, Punjabi language singer
- Shyam Rangeela, comedian and politician
- Sohum Shah, Actor, Entrepreneur, was born in Sri Ganganagar
- Jagdeep Sidhu, Indian film director
- Jagjit Singh, Ghazal singer, was born in Sri Ganganagar
- Ankit Soni, played for Gujarat Lions in the 2017 Indian Premier League
- Manav Suthar, India and Gujarat Titans cricketer, was born in Sri Ganganagar
- Manika Vishwakarma, Miss Universe India 2025, was born in Sri Ganganagar
