= List of state highways in Rajasthan =

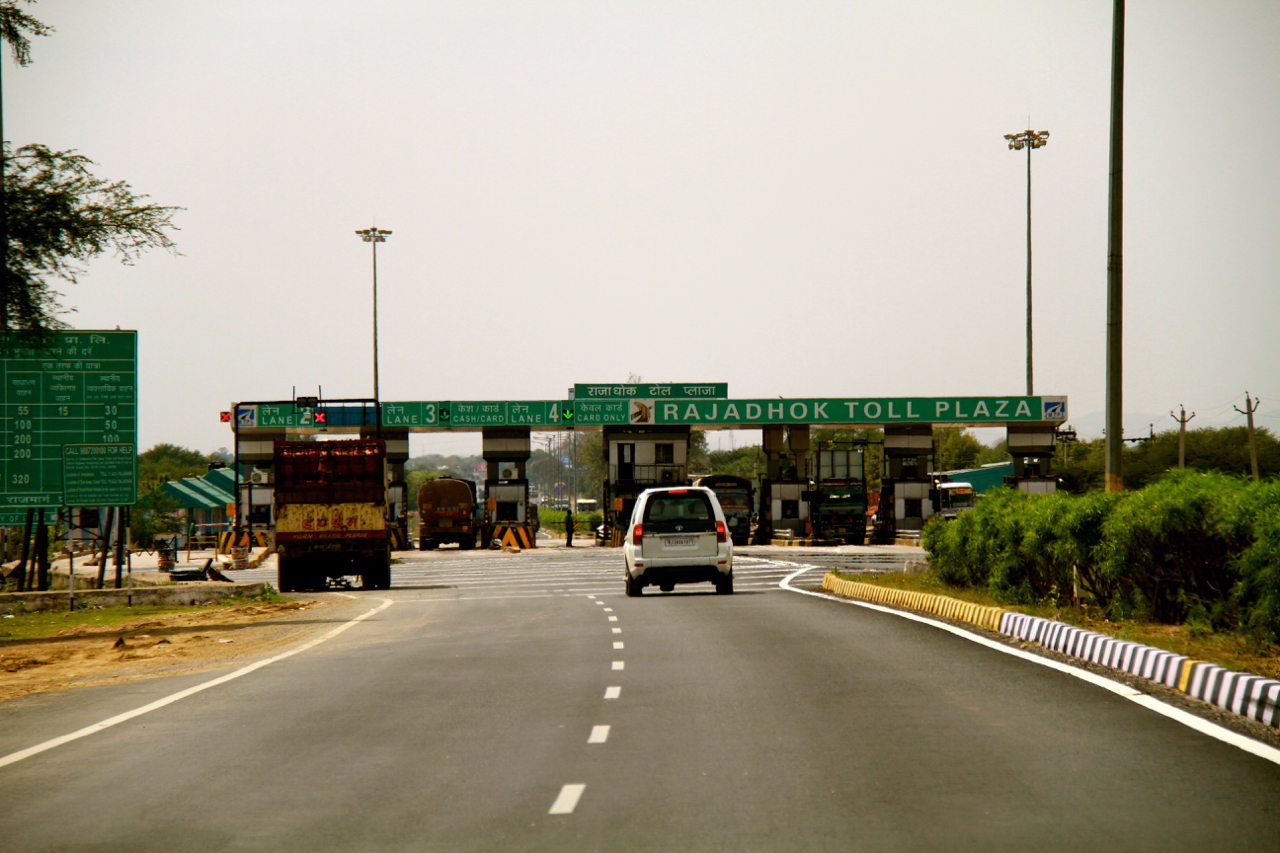
A Highway Toll in Rajasthan

This is a list of state highways in Rajasthan, India.

Rajasthan's state highways, designated as "RJ SH", are a vital part of the state's transport network.

== Overview ==
Rajasthan has a network which includes 48 National Highways totaling 10,618 km and 170 State Highways covering 17,238 km (10,711 mi), as of 31 March 2022.

The Public Works Department (PWD) of the Government of Rajasthan is responsible for the construction and maintenance of these roads. The legal framework for this is established by the Rajasthan State Highways Act, 2014, which provides for the declaration, development, and regulation of these highways.

== List of State Highways ==
Number	Length (km)	Length (mi)	Southern or western terminus	Northern or eastern terminus	Formed	Removed	Notes
SH 1	6	3.7	Jhalawar (MP. Border) to Mathura (UP Border) via Jhalarapatan, Jhalawar, Baran, Mangrol, Itawah, Genta(गैंता)-Maakhida (A Rajasthan's longest Bridge on Chambal river, Laban, Lakheri, Indergarh, Sawai Madhopur, Bhadoti, Gangapur City, Suroth, Hindaun, Bayana, Bharatpur.		—	—	
SH 2	210	130	Dausa to Kuchaman via Lawan, Tunga, Chaksu, Phagi, Mozmabad, Dudu, Sambhar, Nawan, Palari, Kuchaman City.		—	—	
SH 2A	44	27	Dholpur (NH 3) to Rajakhera up to State Border		—	—	
SH 2B	53	33	Palari to Khatu via Managlana, Makrana.		—	—	
SH 2C	78	48	Jaipur to Nawan via Jobner, Pachkodiya		—	—	
SH 3	267.2	166.0	Ganganagar to Bikaner via Chunawadh, Padampur, Gajsinghpur, Raisinghnagar, Anupgarh, Gharsana, Chattargarh.		—	—	
SH 6	159.6	99.2	Dungargarh (NH 11) to Rajgarh via Sardarshahar, Taranagar.		—	—	
SH 6A	137	85	Sawai Bari (SH-6) to Sattasar via Varsisar, Lunkaransar		—	—	
SH 7	409.05	254.17	Kishangarh to Sangaria via Roopangarh, Parbatsar, Manglana, Kuchaman City, Losal, Salasar, Ratangarh, Sardarshahar, Pallu, Rawatsar, Hanumangarh.		—	—	
SH 7A	42.7	26.5	Hanumangarh to Abohar via Sadulshahar.		—	—	
SH 7B	85	53	Sadulshahar Ganganagar, Mirzawala, Karanpur.		—	—	
SH 7C	37	23	Ratangarh to Talchhapar.		—	—	
SH 7D	72	45	Ranasar (SH-7) to Ladnun via Daulatpura, Didwana		—	—	
SH 7E	71	44	Sarwar to Kishangarh via Arai		—	—	
SH 8	124	77	Sikar to Luharu up to State Border via Nawalgarh, Mukandgarh, Jhunjhunu, Baggar, Chirawa, Surajargh.		—	—	
SH 8A	86	53	Sikar to Pachkodia via Lalas, Ghatwa, Danta, Ramgarh, Renwal.		—	—	
SH 8B	25.5	15.8	Jatawali to Kaladera via Chomu		—	—	
SH 9	99.8	62.0	Dabok (NH 76) to Chittaurgarh via Mavli, Bhopalsagar, Kapasan.		—	—	
SH 9A	125.8	78.2	Katunda to Shri Chhatarpura via Bharodia, Cheechat, Ramganj Mandi.		—	—	
SH 9B	11	6.8	Suket to Ramganj Mandi.		—	—	
SH 10	315	196	Swaroopganj (Junction of NH 14) to Ratlam up to State Border via Royada, Kotada, Kherwara, Dungarpur, Sagwara, Garhi, Banswara, Danpur.		—	—	
SH 11	108	67	Sanchore(NH 15) to Abu Road via Raniwara Kalan, Mandar		—	—	
SH 12	324.2	201.4	Sanganer to Kankroli via Phagi, Diggi, Malpura, Sawariya, Kekri, Shahpura, Mandal, Bhilwara.		—	—	
SH 13	329.6	204.8	Alwar to Rajgarh via Kushalgarh, Talvarksh, Narayanpur, Thanagazi, Ghata Bhandrol, Shahpura, Kanwat, Neem ka Thana, Khetri, Singhana, Chrawa, Pilani.		—	—	
SH 14	165.1	102.6	Bharatpur to Narnaul (State Border) via Deeg, Nagar, Meo ka Baroda, Baggar ka Tiraha, Alwar, Jindoli, Tatarpur, Sodawas, Barrod, Behror, Narnaul		—	—	
SH 15	77	48	Mangalwar to Neemach up to State border via Dungala, Bari Sadri, Chhoti Sadri.		—	—	
SH 16	276	171	Chawa to Amritia (NH 8) via Sindhari, Jalore, Takhatgarh, Sanderao, Sadri, Desuri.		—	—	
SH 19	368	229	Phalodi (NH 15) to Needar via Ahu, Chadi, Pachudi, Nagaur, Tarneu, Khatu Kalan, Khatu khurd, Toshina, Kuchaman City, Bhuni, Maroth, Deoli Minda, Renwal Crossing, Kaladera.		—	—	
SH 19A	121	75	Jhalawar to Agar(State Border)`via Pipliya, Suliya, Bhawani Mandi, Dug		—	—	
SH 19B	14.7	9.1	Mangrol (SH-1) to Rajpura via Bamori Kalan		—	—	
SH 20	172.1	106.9	Sikar to Nokha via Salasar, Sujangarh, Talchhapar.		—	—	
SH 20A	58	36	Bidasar to Ganeri via Jaswantgarh.		—	—	
SH 20B	143	89	Bikaner to Ladnun via Napasar, Jasrasar		—	—	
SH 21	96.4	59.9	Dantiweara to Merta City via Pipar City, Borunda.		—	—	
SH 21A	60	37	Parbatsar to NH 89 Junction via Piplad, Bagaut, Harsore, Bherunda, Dodiyana.		—	—	
SH 22	194.7	121.0	Mandrayal to Pahadi up to State Border via Karauli, Hindaun, Mahuwa, Kathoomar Kherli, Nagar.		—	—	
SH 23	63.2	39.3	Bharatpur(NH 11-Uncha Nagala)to Dhaulpur (NH 11B)via Roopwas, Sepau.		—	—	
SH 24	122	76	Bhadoti Mod (SH-1) to Bassi via Junction of NH 11B Lalsot, Tunga		—	—	
SH 25	225	140	Daruhera to Gangapur City via Bhiwadi, Tapookara, Tijara, Kishangarh Bas, Alwar, Rajgarh, Bandikui, Sikandara, Nadoti		—	—	
SH 25A	62.5	38.8	Tehala to GaRhi Sawai Ram Via Rajgarh (SH-35)		—	—	
SH 26	99	62	Nasirabad to Deoli (SH-12) via Kekri		—	—	
SH 27	72	45	Sirohi (NH 14) to Deesa up to District Border via Mandar		—	—	
SH 28	259	161	Phalodi (NH 15) to Ramji ki Gol via Dechu, Shergarh, Pachpadra, Balotra, Sindri, Guda Malani.		—	—	
SH 28B	24	15	Pachpadra (NH 112) to Bagundi		—	—	
SH 29	139	86	Uniara(NH 116) to Bijoliya (NH 76) via Bundi, Indergarh, Lakheri up to NH 76		—	—	
SH 29A	20.5	12.7	Sariska Palace to Tehla (Km.20.5) to via Pandupole		—	—	
SH 29B	44.00	27.34	Bundi to Nainwa		—	—	
SH 30	34	21	Sawai Madhopur(NH 116) to Palighat up to State Border.		—	—	
SH 31	107	66	Jalore(SH-16) to Raniwara Kalan(SH- 11) via Ramseen Bhinmal		—	—	
SH 32	219	136	Sadri (SH-16-62) to Banswara via Ranakpur, Gogunda, Udaipur, Salumbar Aspur, Sabala, Lohariya, Ganoda.		—	—	
SH 33	116	72	Rawatbhata (SH-9A) to Laban via Kota, Keshoraipatan, Kapren.		—	—	
SH 34	112.8	70.1	Tonk to Keshoraipatan via Nagar, Nainwa, Khatkad.		—	—	
SH 35	66.1	41.1	Mahuwa to Govindgarh (SH-45) via Mandawar Gadhi Sawai Ram, Laxmangarh.		—	—	
SH 36	242.1	150.4	Churu (NH 52) to Ganganagar via Taranagar, Sahawa, Nohar, Thaladaka, Munda, Hanumangarh, Lalgarh.		—	—	
SH 37	—	—	Chomu (NH 52) to Churu via Ajeetgarh Shrimadhopur, Khendela, Udaipurwati		—	—	
SH 37A	229.9	142.9	Dudu to Manohar Thana via Malpura, Todaraisingh, Tonk, Nagar, Nainwa, Khatgarh, Kapren, Barod, Siswali, Baran.		—	—	
SH 37B	141.5	87.9	Kotputli (NH 8) to Losal (SH-7) via Patan, Neem ka Thana, Chala, Udaipurwati, Sikar, Dhod.		—	—	
SH 37C	23.9	14.9	Udaipuriya Mod (NH 52) to Mundru shrimadhopur (SH-37) via Khejroli		—	—	
SH 38	111.5	69.3	Sirohi (NH 14) to Balotra (NH 112) via Jawal, Kalandri, Ramseen, Jalore, Makalsar, Siwana.		—	—	
SH 39	318	198	Satur (NH 12) to Mundwa via Jahajpur, Shahpura, Vijaynagar, Beawar, Merta City, Lambia, Merta Road, Khajwana.		—	—	
SH 40	342	213	Gadara road to Nachana via Pokharan, Barmer, Chawa, Baytoo, Kanod, Phalsoond, Miniyana, Pokharan.		—	—	
SH 41	111.2	69.1	Fatehpur to Rajgarh via Jhunjhunun, Alsisar, Malsisar.		—	—	
SH 42	37	23	Bari (NH 11B) to Kheragarh up to Stat Border via Saipau, Basai Nawab.		—	—	
SH 43	89	55	Bari (NH 11B to Sonkh up to State Border via Baseri, Bandh Baretha, Kheria Mod, Ucchan, Bharatpur		—	—	
SH 44	129.2	80.3	Natani ka Bera to Kaman Koshi Road via Mala Khera, Laxmangarh, Kathoomar, Nadbai, Deeg.		—	—	
SH 45	135	84	Ramgarh (SH-13) to Fatehpur Sikri (up to State Border) via Govindgarh, Sikari, Nagar, Nadbai, Weir, Bayana, Rudawal, Bharatpur Alwar		—	—	
SH 48	27.6	17.1	Chhani to Rani		—	—	
SH 49	115.8	72.0	Mavli to Charbhujaji (SH-16) via Nathdwara, Kelwara		—	—	
SH 50	93	58	Udaipur to Som (SH-10) via Jhadol		—	—	
SH 51	156.3	97.1	Kota to Dharnawada up to State Border via Ladpura, Sangod, Chhabra.		—	—	
SH 52	131.5	81.7	Ajaraka (SB) to Tala via Mundawar, Sodawas, Harsora, Narayanpur, Thanagazi.		—	—	
SH 53	126	78	Bhindar to Rikhabdeo via Bambora, Salumbar, Kalyanpur.		—	—	
SH 54	104	65	Aspur to Saruthana via Punjpur, Punali, Dobra, Simalwara, Peeth.		—	—	
SH 55	89.6	55.7	Gudha (SH-52) to Jaipur (NH 8) via Kishori, Sidh ka Tibara, Jhiri, Andhi, Ramgarh.		—	—	
SH 56	83	52	Mandri (SH-12) to Lassani Tal up to NH 8 via Amet, Devgarh.		—	—	
SH 57	26	16	Mokhampura (NH 8) to Sambhar via Phulera		—	—	
SH 58	181	112	Jodhpur to Bheem up to NH 58 via Vinaika, Mandor, Jodhpur, Sardar samand, Jadan, Sojat Road, Kantalia, Jhinjharadi, Bhabhan, Badakheda, Bheem(Rajsamand).		—	—	
SH 59	159.9	99.4	Beawar to Neemla Jodha via Pisangan, Govindgarh, Ladpura, Tehla, Bherunda, Harsore, Degana, Khatu, Bhantri.		—	—	
SH 60	181	112	Thanwala to Ganeri (SH-20) via Bherunda, Neemari, Kothariya, Degana, Sanjhun, Tarneu, Jayal, Didwana.		—	—	
SH 61	349	217	Phalodi (NH 15) to Mandal via Osian, Mathania, Jodhpur, Khejrali, Bhatenda, Saradasamand, Jadan, Marwar Junction, Auwa, Jojawar, Kamalighat, Devgarh, Rajaji ka kareda.		—	—	
SH 62	187	116	Bilara to Pindwara via Sojat, Sireeyari, Jojawar, Bagol, Desuri, Sadri, Sewari.		—	—	
SH 63	129	80	Banar to Kuchera via Bhopalgarh Asop.		—	—	
SH 64	82	51	Rohat (NH 65) to Ahore (SH-16) via Vasi, Bhadrajun.		—	—	
SH 65	154.5	96.0	Sheo (NH 15) to Shergarh via Bhiyad, Barnawa Jagger, Patodi, Phalsoond.		—	—	
SH 66	90	56	Siwana to Dhandhaniya (NH 114) via Samdari, Kalyanpur, Mandli Rodhawa Kalan.		—	—	
SH 67	87	54	Sardar Samand (SH-61) to Desuri (SH-62) via Pali, Ramsiya, Somesar,		—	—	
SH 68	131	81	Dangiyawas (NH 112) to Balotra via Kakelao, Khejarli, Guda Kakani, Luni, Dhundhara, Rampura, Samdari.		—	—	
SH 69	35	22	Churu Bhaleri		—	—	
SH 117	102	63	Diggi	Jastana	—	—	
SH 122	158	98	Baroni (NH 52)	Kurgaon (NH 23)	—	—	
SH 123	102	63	Bhahrowanda	Jagner, Utter Pradash	—	—	
SH 138	103.72	64.45	SH 29 in Bhopatpura	NH 148D at Nenwa	—	—	

== Expressways ==
Rajasthan is developing several modern expressways. These are typically greenfield (new alignment) or high-grade highways designed for controlled access, ensuring faster and safer movement of traffic across the state and linking it to major national economic corridors. Construction of these corridors are done by the Central body, National Highways Authority of India (NHAI).

Name	Terminals in Rajasthan		Length (Rajasthan Section)	Status
NE-4 (Delhi-Mumbai Expressway)	Near Alwar	Jhalawar (Near Kota)	374 km (232 mi)	Partially Completed
NE-4C (Bandikui–Jaipur Expressway)	Jaipur	Bandikui	67 km (42 mi)	Fully Completed
EC-3 (Amritsar-Jamnagar Expressway)	Sangaria (Near Hanumangarh)	Sanchore	638 km (396 mi)	Fully Completed
NH-48 (Jaipur-Kishangarh Expressway)	Jaipur	Kishangarh	90 km (56 mi)	Fully Completed
NH48 (Delhi-Jaipur Expressway)	Jaipur	Delhi	242 km (150 mi)	Partially Completed
EC-8 (Ludhiana-Bathinda-Ajmer Expressway)	Bhadra	Ajmer	489 km (303 mi)	Planned

== See also ==
- Expressways of India
- National highways of India
- State highways in India
- Government of Rajasthan
- Public Works Department, Government Of Rajasthan
- State Highways in Rajasthan
