= State Highway 38 (Rajasthan) =

Road in Rajasthan, India

State Highway 38

Route information
- Length: 111.50 km (69.28 mi)

Major junctions
- North-West end: Sirohi, Rajasthan
- South-East end: Balotra, Rajasthan

Location
- Country: India
- State: Rajasthan
- Districts: Sirohi, Jalore, Barmer
- Primary destinations: Jawal, Kalandri, Mandoli, Ramseen, Akoli, Bagra, Jalore, Bishangarh, Mokalsar, Siwana, Thapan

Highway system
- Roads in India; Expressways; National; State; Asian; State Highways in Rajasthan

State Highway 38 ( RJ SH 38) is a State Highway in Rajasthan state of India that connects Sirohi in Sirohi district of Rajasthan with Balotra in Barmer district of Rajasthan. The total length of RJ SH 38 is 111.50 km.

This highway connects National Highway 14 in Sirohi to National Highway 112 in Balotra. Other cities and towns on this highway are: Jawal, Kalandri, Mandoli, Ramseen, Akoli, Bagra, Jalore, Bishangarh, Mokalsar, Siwana and Thapan.
