= State Highway 1 (Rajasthan) =

State highway in Rajasthan

State Highway 1
- State Highway 1 in red

Route information
- Length: 432.80 km (268.93 mi)

Major junctions
- From: NH 52 in Jhalawar
- To: NH 21 at Bharatpur

Location
- Country: India
- State: Rajasthan
- Primary destinations: Jhalarapatan, Jhalawar, Baran, Mangrol, Itawa, Laban, Lakheri, Indergarh, Sawai Madhopur, Bhadoti, Gangapur City, Suroth, Hindaun, Bayana, Bharatpur

Highway system
- Roads in India; Expressways; National; State; Asian; State Highways in Rajasthan
→ SH 2

State Highway 1 (RJ SH 1) is a state highway in Rajasthan state of India that connects Jhalawar to Bharatpur. The total length of SH 1 is 432.8 km. It starts from National Highway 52 (NH-52) in Jhalawar and ends at National Highway 21 (NH-21) in Bharatpur.

== Junctions ==
NH 52 near Jhalawar.
NH 752 near Khanpur
SH 51 near Bapawar
NH 27 near Baran
SH 37A near Baran
SH 19B near Mangrol
SH 70 near Itawah
SH 33 near Laban
SH 29 near Lakheri
NH 552 near Sawai Madhopur
SH 122 near Sawai Madhopur
SH 24 near Malarana Chour
NH 23 near Gangapur City
SH 25 near Gangapur City
SH 22 near Hindaun
SH 45 near Bayana
SH 43 near Uchchain
NH 21 in Madoli near Bharatpur
