= State Highway 138 (Rajasthan) =

Road in Rajasthan, India

State Highway 138

Route information
- Maintained by Public Works Department, Rajasthan
- Length: 103.72 km (64.45 mi)

Major junctions
- From: SH 29 in Bhopatpura
- To: NH 148D at Nainwa

Location
- Country: India
- State: Rajasthan

Highway system
- Roads in India; Expressways; National; State; Asian; State Highways in Rajasthan
← SH 137	→ SH 139

State Highway 138 (RJ SH 138, SH-138) is a State Highway in Rajasthan state of India that connects Bhopatpura in Bundi district of Rajasthan with Nainwa in Bundi district of Rajasthan. The total length of RJ SH 138 is 103.72 km.

This highway connects SH-29 in Bhopatpura to NH-148D in Nenwa.
