= State Highway 21 (Rajasthan) =

State Highway in Rajasthan

State Highway 21
- Map of State Highway 21 in red

Route information
- Maintained by National Highway Authority Of India
- Length: 88 km (55 mi)

Major junctions
- From: Dantiweara
- Borunda; Khejarla; Pipar City
- To: Merta City

Location
- Country: India
- State: Rajasthan
- Villages: Satlawas; Indawar; Bayad fanta; Bittan; Borunda; Garhsuriya; Madliya; Nanan; Ransi Gaon; Khejarla; Chirdhani; Buchkalla; Pipar City; Riya

Highway system
- Roads in India; Expressways; National; State; Asian; State Highways in Rajasthan
← SH 21A	→ SH 22

State Highway 21 Rajasthan is an important highway between Jodhpur and Merta City.
