= State Highway 29B (Rajasthan) =

Road in Rajasthan, India

State Highway 29B

Route information
- Maintained by Public Works Department, Rajasthan
- Length: 44 km (27 mi)

Major junctions
- From: SH 29 in Bundi
- To: NH 148D at Nainwa

Location
- Country: India
- State: Rajasthan

Highway system
- Roads in India; Expressways; National; State; Asian; State Highways in Rajasthan
← SH 29	→ SH 30

State Highway 29B (RJ SH 29B, SH-29B) is a State Highway in Rajasthan state of India that connects Bundi in Bundi district of Rajasthan with Nainwa in Bundi district of Rajasthan. The total length of RJ SH 29B is 44.00 km.
