= State Highway 14 (Rajasthan) =

State Highway 14

Route information
- Maintained by Public Works Department, Rajasthan

Major junctions
- From: Bharatpur
- To: Narnaul

Location
- Country: India
- State: Rajasthan

Highway system
- Roads in India; Expressways; National; State; Asian; State Highways in Rajasthan

State Highway 14 is a state highway in between Bharatpur and Narnaul in the Indian state of Rajasthan.

== Route ==
- Deeg,
- Nagar,
- Meo ka Baroda,
- Baggar ka Tiraha,
- Alwar,
- Jindoli,
- Tatarpur,
- Sodawas,
- Sahibi River Bridge
- Barrod,
- Behror,
- Narnaul,
- Bharatpur,
- Dhera,
- Nadbai,
- Kherli,
- Nagar,
- Alwar

== See also ==
- List of state highways in Rajasthan
