= State Highway 31 (Rajasthan) =

Road in Rajasthan, India

State Highway 31

Route information
- Length: 107 km (66 mi)

Major junctions
- North-East end: Jalore, Rajasthan
- South-West end: Raniwara, Rajasthan

Location
- Country: India
- State: Rajasthan
- Districts: Rajasthan: Jalore district
- Primary destinations: Bagra, Akoli, Mandoli, Ramseen, Bhinmal

Highway system
- Roads in India; Expressways; National; State; Asian; State Highways in Rajasthan

State Highway 31 ( RJ SH 31) is a state highway in Rajasthan state of India that connects Jalore in Jalore district of Rajasthan with Raniwara in same district. The total length of RJ SH 31 is 107 km.

Other cities and towns on this highway are: Bagra, Akoli, Mandoli, Ramseen and Bhinmal.

== See also ==
- List of state highways in Rajasthan
