= Sujrai State =

Former british colonial india state

Sujrai State सुजरई रियासत
- Princely State of British India
- 1858–1949
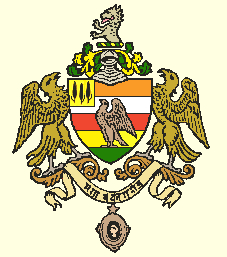
- Flag Coat of arms
- History
  - Established: 1858
  - Indian independence: 1949
| Succeeded by |
| India |
- Today part of: Uttar Pradesh, India

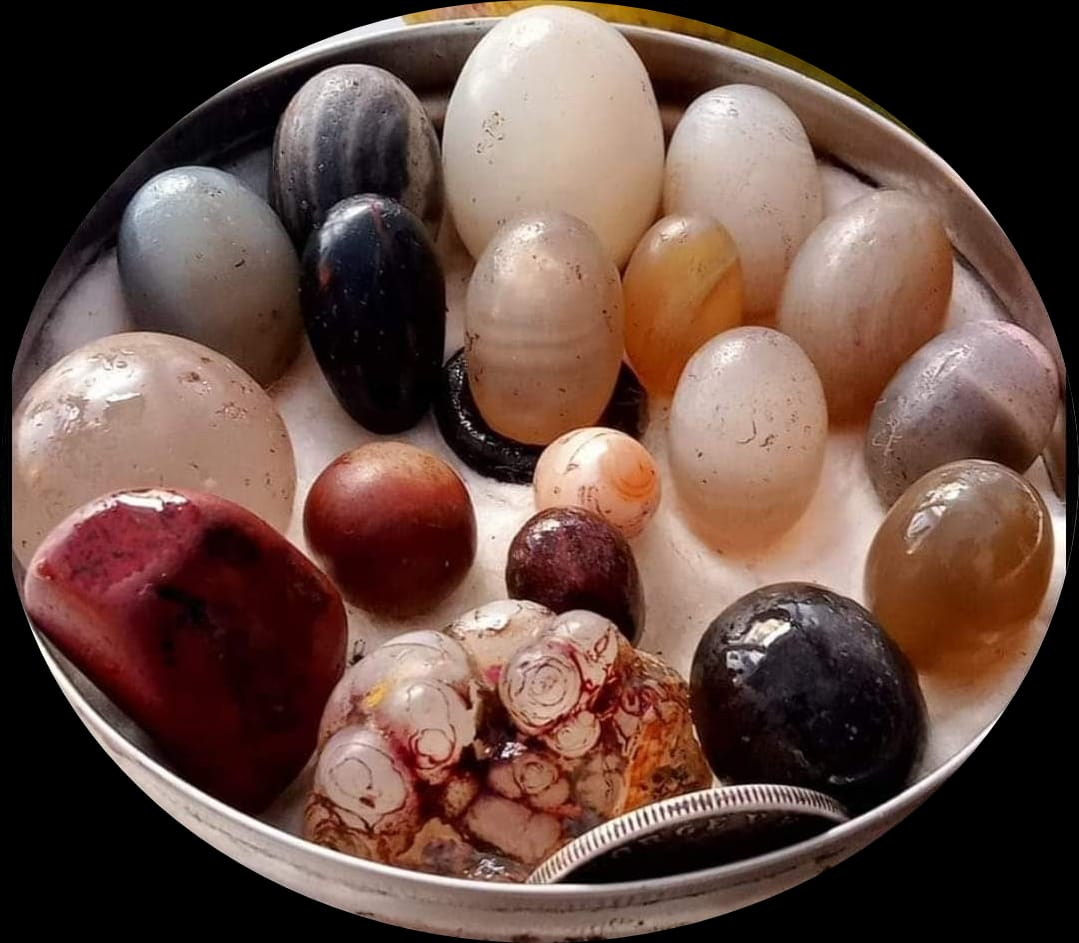
Deity of the family.

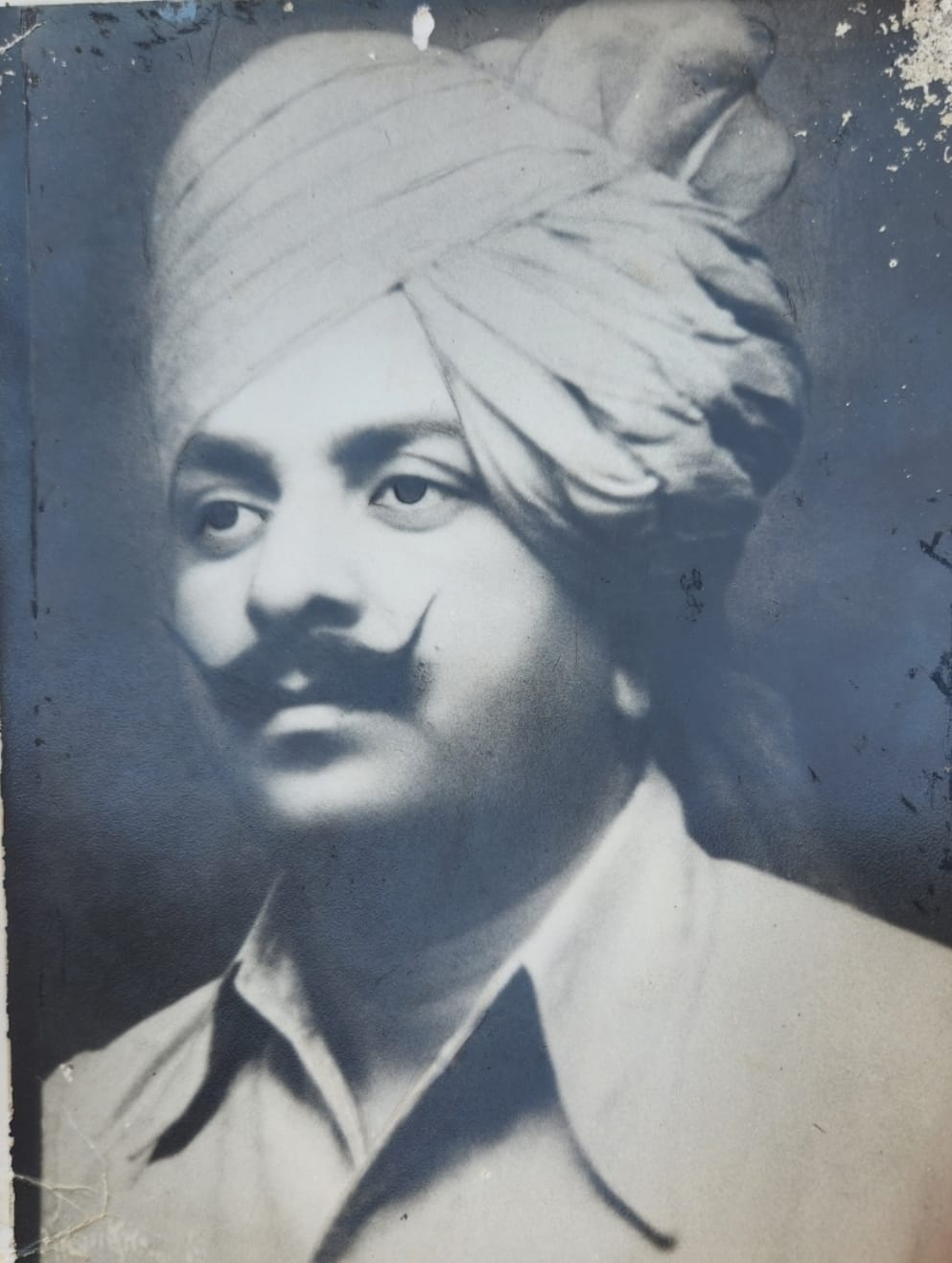
Thakur Jai Singh of Jounl

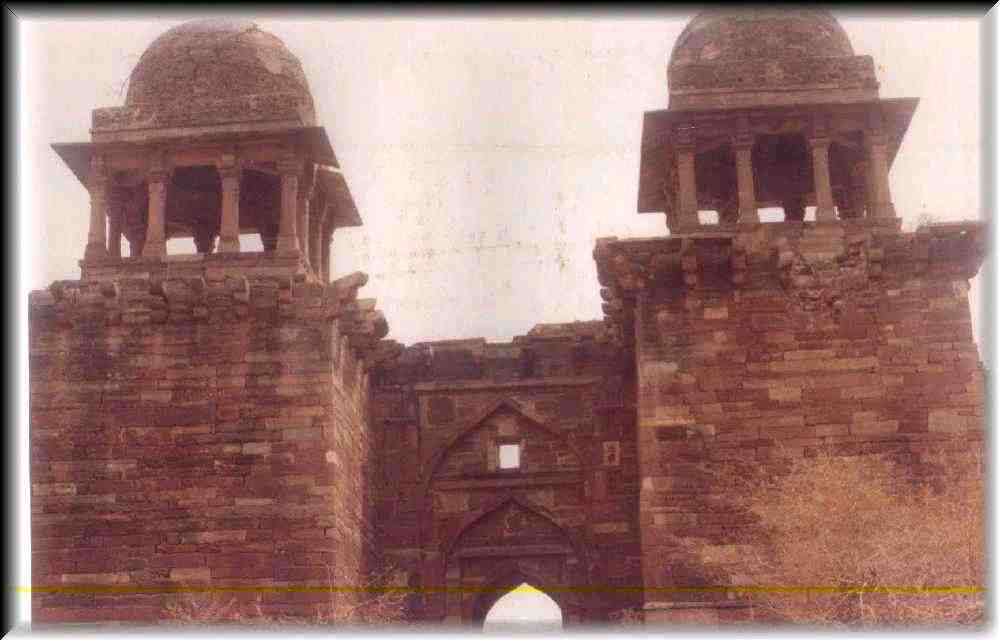
View of Fort in former Sujrai State.

Sujrai State was a princely state in British India. In legend it formed part of the mythological land of Braj ruled by Krishna .

== History ==
Sujrai was the small state of the Jodha Rathore. Raja Iswari Prasad Narayan Singh was the last Jodha King of this state. Raja Iswari Prasad Narayan Singh had one daughter, Rajkumari Sohan Kanwar, who married Thakur Jai Singh Th. Jounl (distt. Karauli).

Raja Surat Singh of Bikaner settled Moti Singh of the branch of Jodha Rathore from sujrai princely state in Bikaner in 1801.

Raja Laxman Singh was born on 9 October 1826 at Wazirpur Agra, Uttar Pradesh. Raja Laxman Singh was a polyglot—he was proficient in English, Sanskrit, Hindi and, Urdu.

After finishing his college education, he was appointed in the office of the lieutenant governor of northwestern state. He worked very efficiently and in 1855 he was appointed Tehsildar of Etawah. In the revolt of 1857, he had rendered significant aide to the Britishers, and the British gave him the post of Deputy Collector. In 1870, Laxman Singh was awarded the title of "Raja".

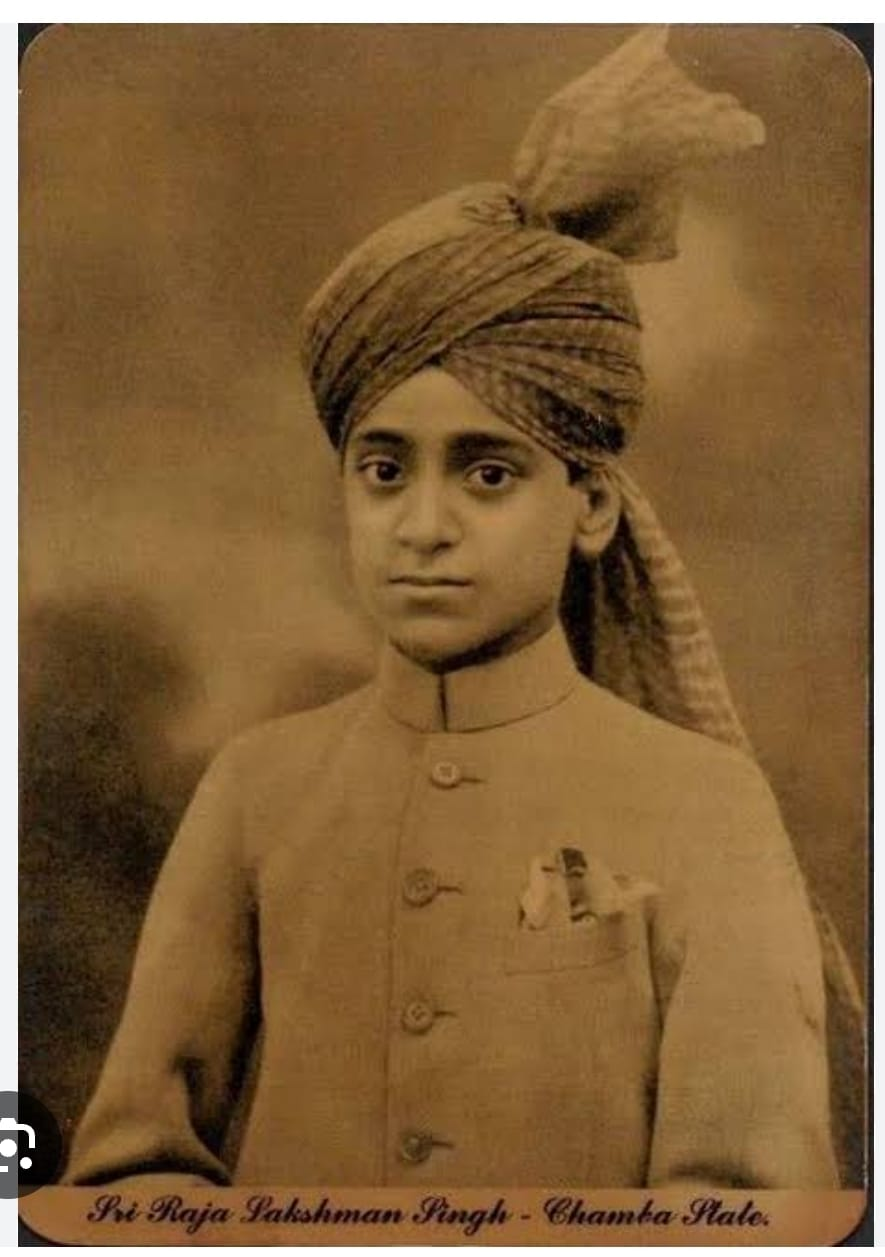
Young Raja Lakshman Singh

While in the service of the British government, in 1861, he took out a letter called "Pahjahiteshi" from Agra. In 1863, the Hindi translation of the epic Kalidas' immortal "Abhigyan Shakuntalam" was published in the name of "Shankutala Natak". King Shivaprasad Satterhind gave this composition a place in his "Gutka". Famous Hindi lover Friedrich Pinkat of that time was very impressed by his language and style and published his work in 1875 in England. It was accepted as a textbook in the examination of the Indian Civil Service. He later translated Kalidas's "Raghuvamsa" and "Meghaduta" in Hindi and clarifying his language policy in its role said —"In our opinion, two dialects are Hindi and Urdu, Hindi is spoken by the Hindus of this country, and Urdu is spoken by the Hindus here and there. The Sanskrit posts are very popular in Hindi, Arabic in Urdu but Persian It is not necessary that Arabic should be spoken without Persian words and neither do we call that language in Hindi, in which the words of Arabic-Persian have been filled."

Raja Laxman Singh was a member of "Fellow" and "Royal Asiatic Society" of Calcutta University. In 1888, when he was released from the service of the government, he became the chief chairman of Agra's Chungi and kept this post for until his demise. His companion Raja Shiv Prasad, who was the vice chairman of Agra Chungi, also was a prominent figure in Hindi literature.

Raja Laxman Singh had two wives, Rani Sahiba Gainda Kanwar and Rani Jugraj Kanwar. He had a son and a daughter. Kunwar Surajbhan Singh died young after drowning in a pond; in his memory a clock tower was built in Mainpuri. Rani Sahiba Jugraj Kanwar commissioned a library in the memory of Kunwar Surajbhan at the location of the pond. The library has a collection of biographies of great men, novels and comics for children.

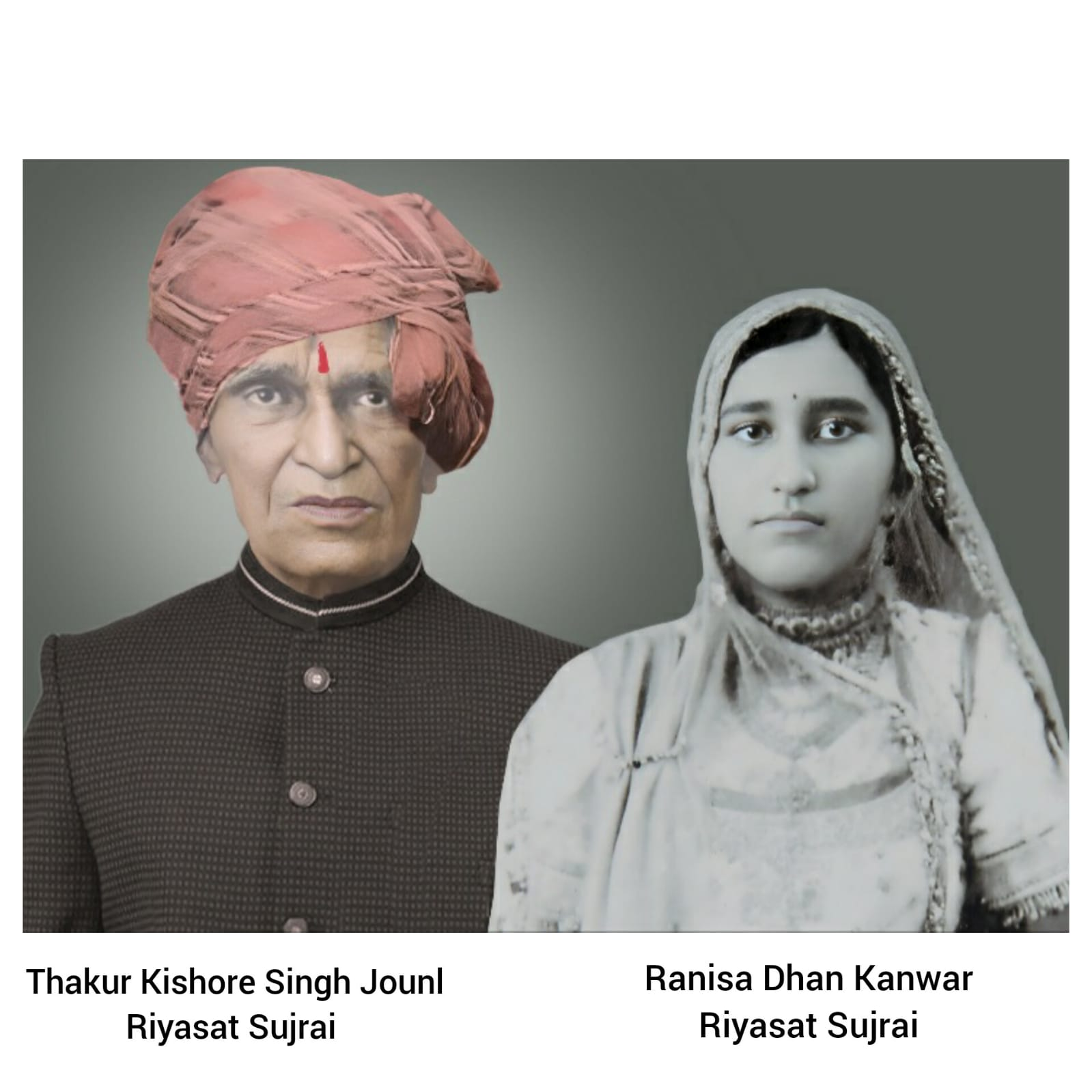
Thakur Kishore Singh of Jounl

Raja Laxman Singh caused to be installed idols of Ganga. Later, these idols were moved and installed at the temple of Maharaj Ji Baba.

Raja Laxman Singh also built the Sujrai Fort. Two palaces were built inside it. Queen Gainda Kanwar resided in one, and Queen Jugraj Kanwar in the other.

The property has been subject to a prolonged inheritance dispute, resulting in the structures being unmaintained and falling into ruin.

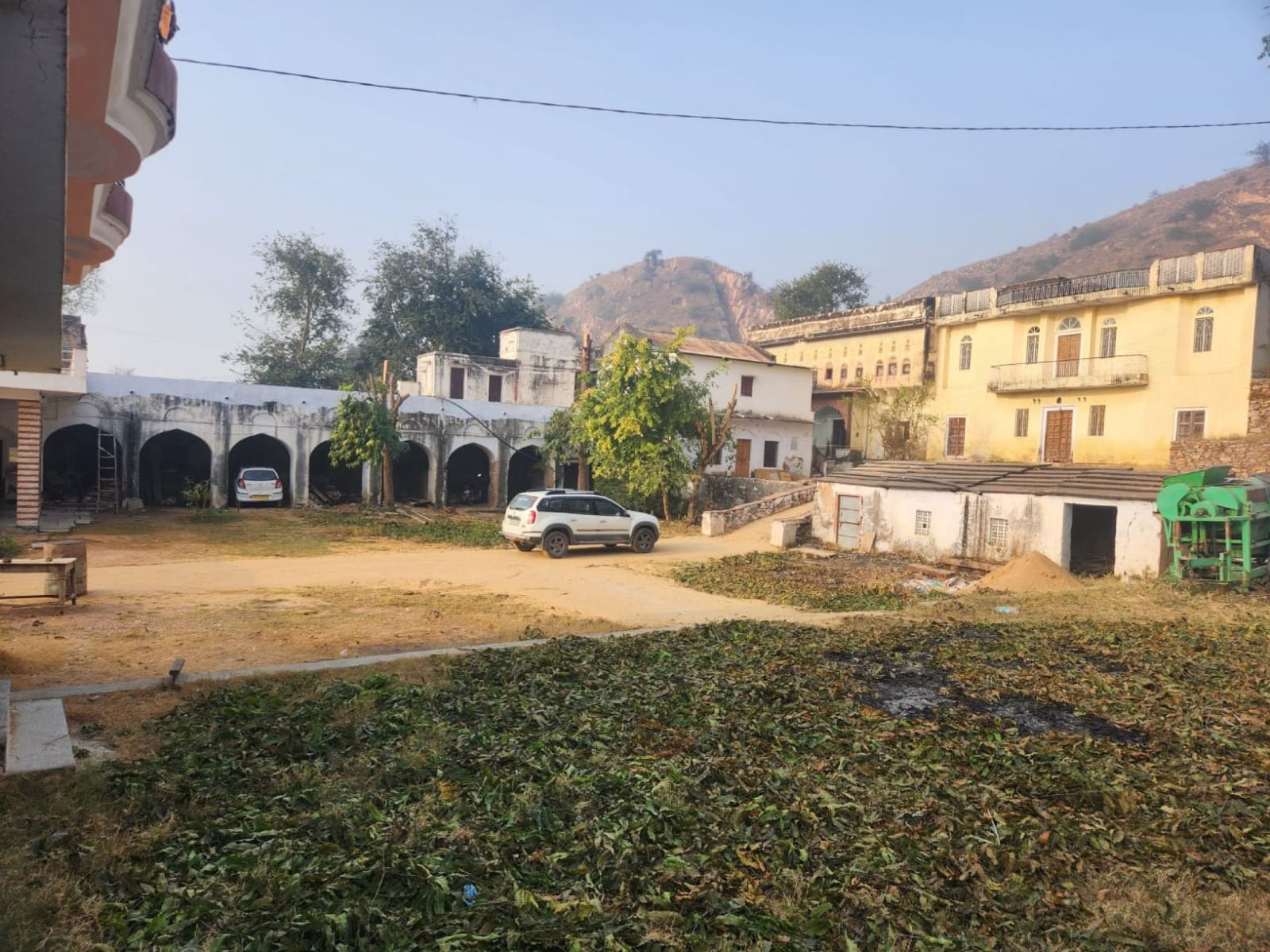
Current place of residence of the family

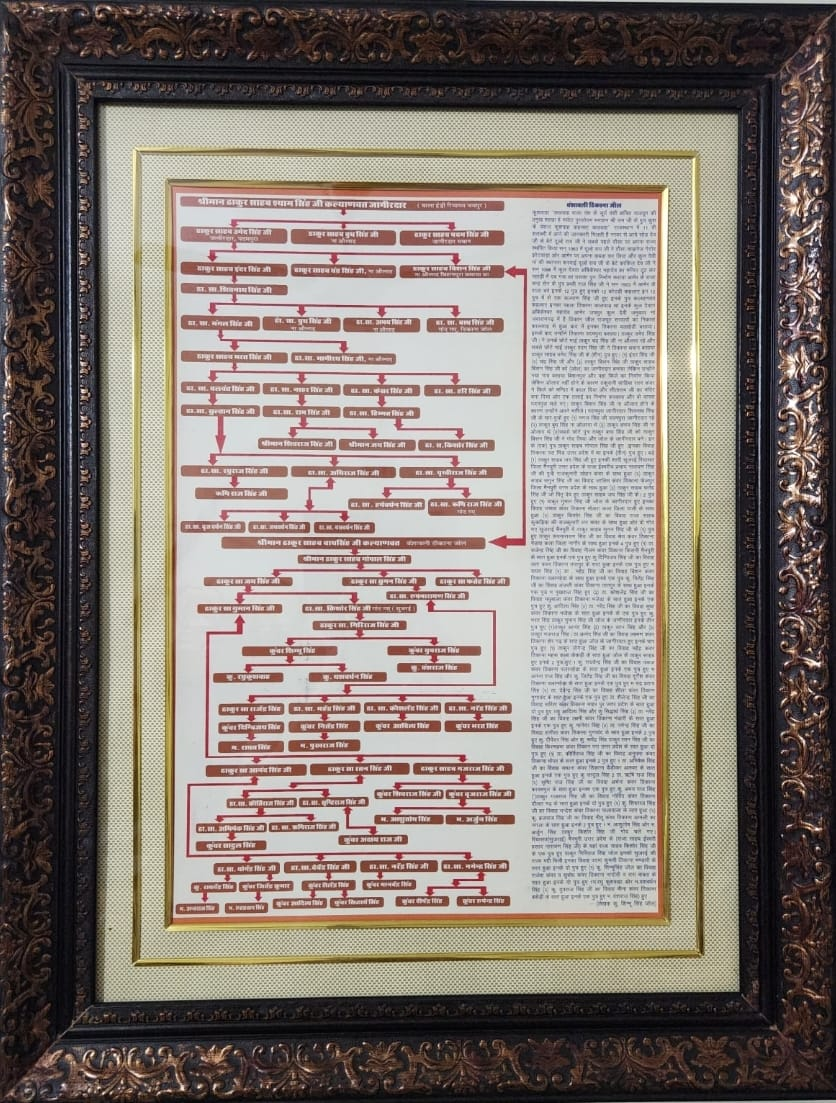
Genealogy

== See also ==
- Political integration of India
- Rajputana Agency
