= Dehmi =

- village
- Location in Rajasthan, India Dehmi (India)
- Coordinates: 27.924629°N 76.333069°E
- Country: India
- State: Rajasthan
- District: Alwar
- Elevation: 312 m (1,024 ft)

Population (2011)
  - Total: 3,256
  - Density: 1,200/km^{2} (3,100/sq mi)

Languages
  - Official: Hindi
- Time zone: UTC+5:30 (IST)
- PIN: 301 701
- Telephone code: 91 1494
- ISO 3166 code: RJ-IN
- Vehicle registration: RJ-02

Dehmi is an Indian village in Rajasthan near NH-8 (Delhi to Jaipur). There is a Hindu temple there dedicated to Shakti.

== Geography ==
Dehmi is near Barrod, Bhatkhani and kakardopa NH-8 (Delhi to Jaipur) and the Shiva Oasis Resort.
