= State Highway 117 (Rajasthan) =

Road in Rajasthan, India

State Highway 117
- State Highway 117 in Red on India map

Route information
- Part of NH 52
- Maintained by Public Works Department, Rajasthan
- Length: 102.2 km (63.5 mi)

Major junctions
- West end: SH 12 in Diggi
- East end: NH 148N in at Jastana

Location
- Country: India
- State: Rajasthan
- Primary destinations: Diggi, Sohela, Newai, Bonli, Piplada, Justana

Highway system
- Roads in India; Expressways; National; State; Asian; State Highways in Rajasthan
← SH 116	→ SH 118

State Highway 117 (RJ SH 117, SH-117) is a state highway in Rajasthan state of India that connects Diggi in Tonk district of Rajasthan with Justana in Sawai Madhopur district of Rajasthan. The total length of RJ SH 117 is 102.2 kilometres (63.5 mi).

SH-117 has been made by upgrading Major District Road 1. This highway connects SH-12 in Diggi to NH-148N in Jastana.
