= Nagla Tula =

Nagla Tula Nanglatula, Nangla tula, Nagla Tulla
- village
- Location in Rajasthan, India Nagla Tula (India)
- Coordinates: 26°56′13″N 77°23′38″E
- Country: India
- State: Rajasthan
- District: Bharatpur
- Tahsil: Roopwas

Government
  - Body: Gram panchayat
- Time zone: UTC+5:30 (IST)
- PIN: 321405
- ISO 3166 code: RJ-IN
- Vehicle registration: RJ-
- Lok Sabha constituency: Bharatpur SC
- Vidhan Sabha constituency: Bayana SC

Nagla Tula is a village in Rajasthan, India. Administratively, it is under Rudawal ILRC, Roopwas Tehsil, Bharatpur District, Rajasthan. The village has a population of about a thousand.

In May 2013, during a heat wave, a fire in Nagla Tula burned a large portion of the village.
