= Jounl =

- Gram Panchayat
- Location in Rajasthan, India Jounl (India)
- Coordinates: 26.906677°N 76.920534°E
- Country: India
- State: Rajasthan
- District: Karauli
- Tehsil: Todabhim Tehsil
- Elevation: 252 m (827 ft)

Population (2011)
  - Total: 1,000

Languages
  - Official: Hindi
- Time zone: UTC+5:30 (IST)
- PIN: 321611
- Telephone code: 91-7461
- ISO 3166 code: RJ-IN
- Vehicle registration: RJ 34
- Sex ratio: 824:1000 ♂/♀

Jounl is a village in Todabhim, Karauli district in the Indian State of Rajasthan.

Jounl is located beside the NH11 near Kariri village and 5 km away from the RJ SH 22 which is passing through the Khohra Mulla village. There are total five villages under the Gram panchayat Jounl. They are Jounl, Daurawali, Kamalpuriya, Bishanpura and Khediya. The village's current population is near 1000.

== Religious view ==
Hindus are in majority in this village. There are several temples in this village, including:

- Bhairo (Golar) Baba Temple which is situated on the mountain.
- Hiraman Baba Temple
- Pareet Baba Temple
- Bade Baba Ashram which is situated on the mountain

== Geographical view ==
There is a mountain range beside this village .

An anicat (mini size dam) also known as ram talai is also there below that mountain range.
