= Sadulshahar Tehsil =

Tehsil of Sri Ganganagar, Rajasthan

Sadulshahar Tehsil is one of the 9 tehsils of Sri Ganganagar district of Rajasthan, India. It is located in the north-east area of the district. Sadulshahar city is headquarters of the tehsil. Its north border touches Fazilka District of Punjab. It is bordered to the south-east by Hanumangarh district, a few kilometers border in south-west with Padampur tehsil, west by Ganganagar tehsil. A branch of the Bhakra canal irrigates farms of this tehsil.

Punjabi, Bagri and Rajasthani are spoken here.

Khairuwala is one of the villages in Sadulshahar Tehsil. Shasadulshahr DTO office has been started from 31 August 2021 for transport related work to the people of Sadulshahr Tehsil area. The transport district code of Sadulshahr DTO office is RJ-56.

== Demographics ==
Religions in Sadulshahar Tehsil
Religion	Percent
Hindu	72.84%
Sikh	24.98%
Muslim	2.02%
Christians	0.08%
Jain	0.02%
Buddhist	0.01%
Other and Not stated	0.05%

== Languages ==
Language in Sadulshahar Tehsil (2022 estimate)
Language	Percent
Rajasthani	64.7%
Bagri	19.3%
Hindi	7.0%
Punjabi	5.0%
Haryanvi	3.0%
