= State Highway 27 (Rajasthan) =

Road in Rajasthan, India

State Highway 27

Route information
- Length: 72 km (45 mi)

Major junctions
- North-East end: Sirohi, Rajasthan
- South-West end: Deesa, Gujarat

Location
- Country: India
- State: Rajasthan
- Districts: Sirohi
- Primary destinations: Reodar, Mandar, Kuchavada, Kherda

Highway system
- Roads in India; Expressways; National; State; Asian; State Highways in Rajasthan

State Highway 27 (RJ SH 27) is a State Highway in Rajasthan state of India that connects Sirohi in Sirohi district of Rajasthan with Deesa in Banaskantha district of Gujarat. The total length of RJ SH 27 is 72 km.

This highway connects National Highway 14 in Sirohi to National Highway 14 again in Deesa. Other cities and towns on this highway are: Reodar, Mandar, Kuchavada and Kherda.
