= Mokalsar =

- village
- Location in Rajasthan, India Mokalsar (India)
- Coordinates: 25°37′0″N 72°30′0″E
- Country: India
- State: Rajasthan
- District: Balotra district
- Elevation: 443 m (1,453 ft)

Population (2001)
  - Total: 6,925

Languages
  - Official: Hindi
- Time zone: UTC+5:30 (IST)
- PIN: 343043
- Telephone code: 912901
- ISO 3166 code: RJ-IN
- Vehicle registration: RJ-04
- Nearest city: Siwana
- Lok Sabha constituency: Barmer (Lok Sabha constituency)
- Vidhan Sabha constituency: Siwana

Mokalsar is a village in Siwana tehsil of Balotra District in Indian state of Rajasthan, located on RJ SH 38.
