= State Highway 2A (Rajasthan) =

State highway in Rajasthan

State Highway 2A
- State Highway 2A in red

Route information
- Length: 44.20 km (27.46 mi)

Major junctions
- From: NH 44 in Dholpur
- To: Rajakhera up to state border

Location
- Country: India
- State: Rajasthan
- Primary destinations: Dholpur, Rajakhera

Highway system
- Roads in India; Expressways; National; State; Asian; State Highways in Rajasthan
← SH 2	→ SH 2B

State Highway 2A (RJ SH 2A) is a state highway in Rajasthan state of India that connects Dholpur to Rajakhera in Dholpur district. The total length of SH 2A is 44.20 km. It starts from National Highway 44 (NH-44) in Dholpur and ends at the state border in Rajakhera.
