= Ganganagar Tehsil =

- Tehsil
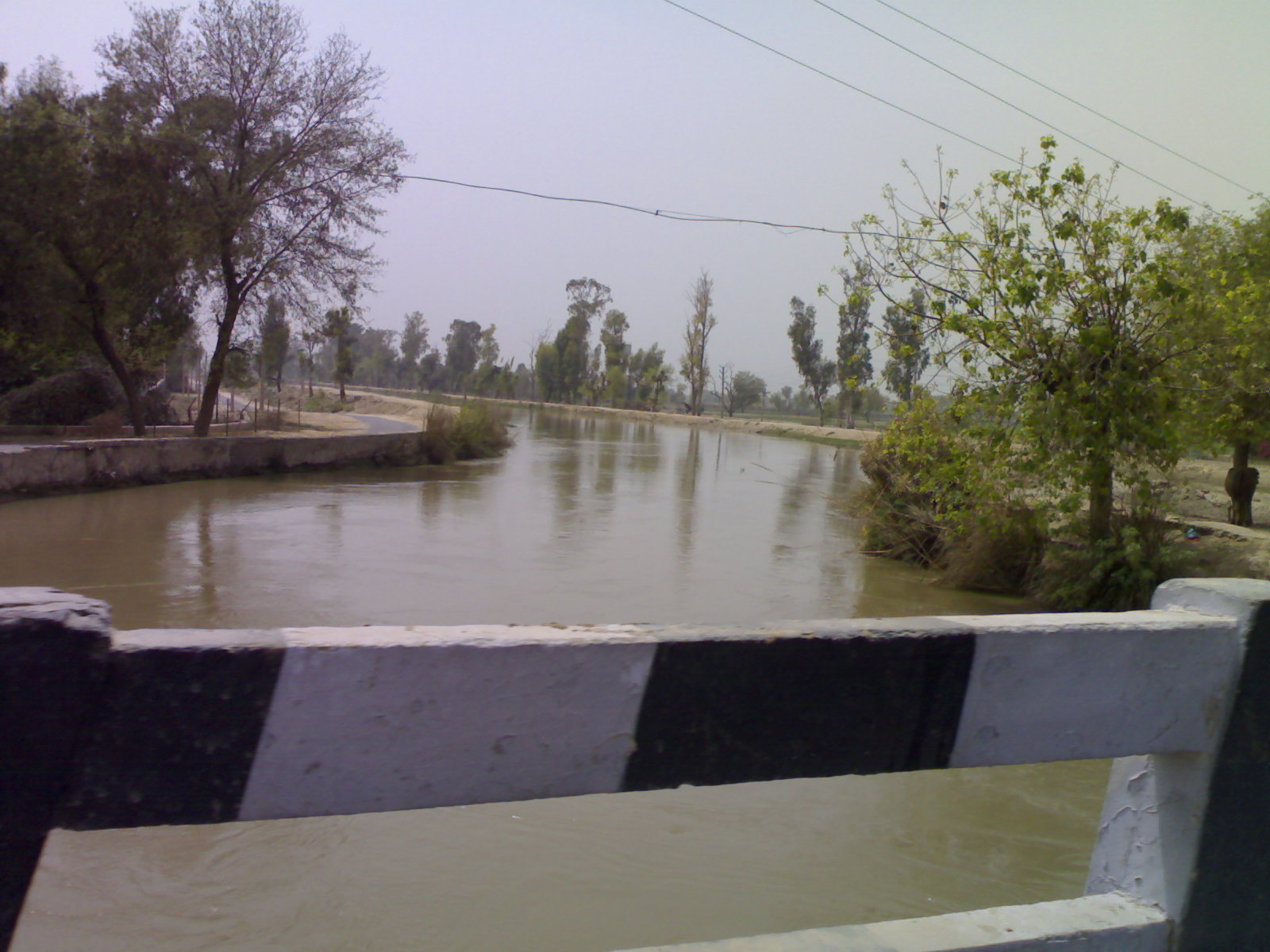
- Gang canal irrigates fields of this tehsil, photo taken near Ganganagar from Ganganagar-Hanumangarh road.
- Country: India
- State: Rajasthan
- District: Sri Ganganagar District
- Headquarters: Sri Ganganagar

Shri Ganganagar tehsil is the northernmost of the nine tehsils of Sri Ganganagar district. Sri Ganganagar city is the headquarters of the tehsil.

Its north border touches Fazilka district of Punjab, India. It is bordered in the east by Sadulshahar Tehsil, south by Padampur tehsil, west by Karanpur tehsil. It touches in north-west with Pakistani Punjab. Chunawadh, Hindumalkot, Mirzawala are Sub Tehsils in Ganganagar Tehsil.. There are 53 Gram Panchayats under Ganganagar Tehsil.

According to the World Air Quality Report 2024, Ganganagar was one of the world's 20 most polluted city in India.
