= Brijnagar railway station =

Railway station in Rajasthan, India

Brijnagar

General information
- Location: Nagar, Bharatpur district, Rajasthan; India
- Coordinates: 27.439110°N 77.089980°E
- Elevation: 204 metres (669 ft)
- System: Indian Railways station
- Owner: Indian Railways
- Operator: North Central Railway
- Line: Alwar–Mathura line
- Platforms: 2
- Tracks: 2

Construction
- Structure type: Standard (on ground station)
- Parking: Yes

Other information
- Status: Functioning
- Station code: BINR
- Zone(s): North Central Railway
- Division(s): Agra
Location
- Location within India Location within Rajasthan

Brijnagar railway station is a railway station in the Bharatpur district of Rajasthan. Its code is BINR. It serves Nagar, Rajasthan. The station consists of 2 platforms. Passenger, Superfast trains halt here.
