= Ransi Gaon =

Village in Rajasthan, India

Ransi Gaon Ransiganv, Ransigav, Ransigav, Ransi
- Village
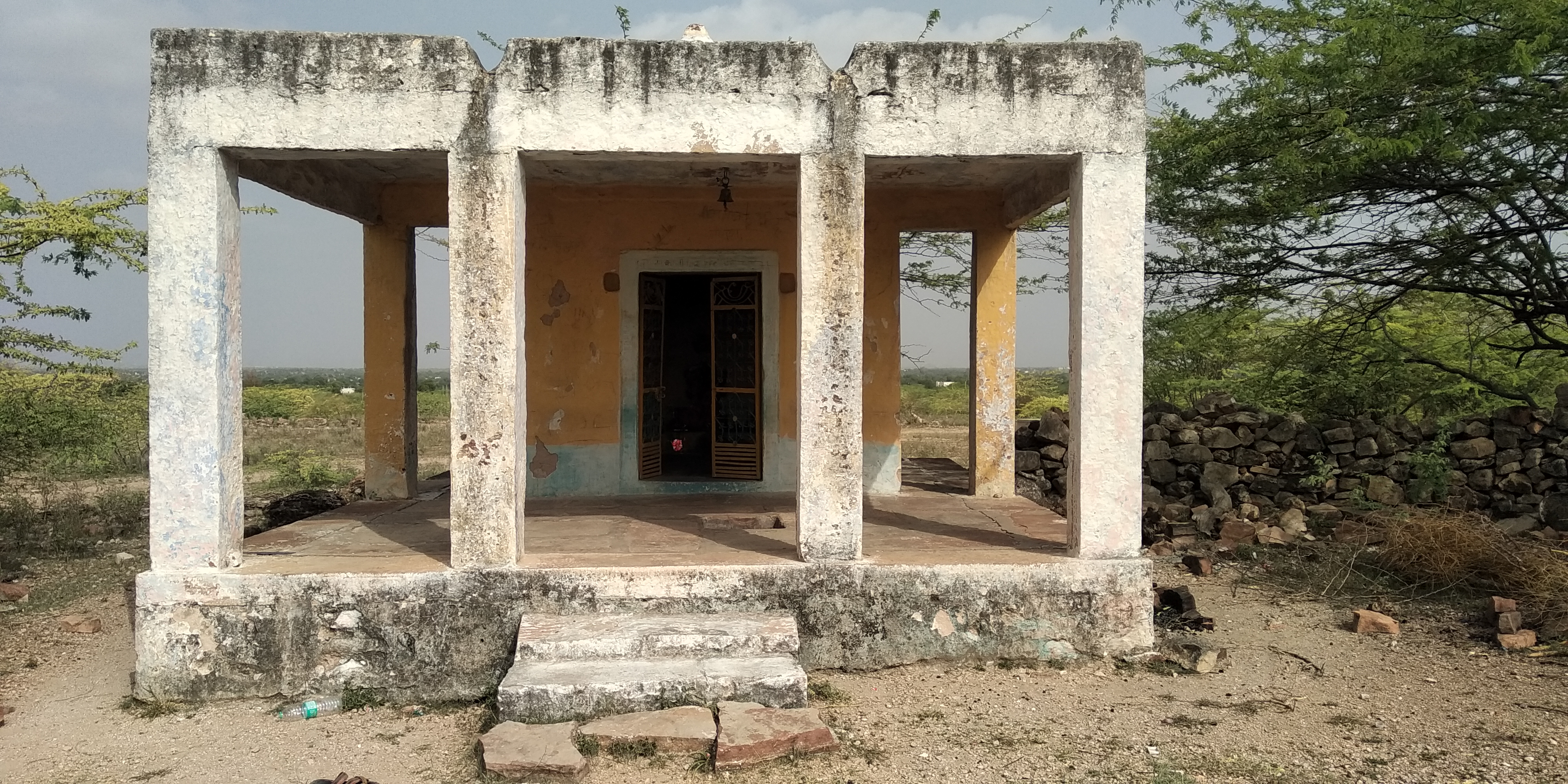
- Chamunda Mata Temple, Ransi Gaon

- Location within Rajasthan Location within India Location within Earth
- Coordinates: 26°21′40.0″N 73°45′01.5″E
- Gram Panchayat: Ransi Gaon
- Tehsil: Bilara
- District: Jodhpur Rural
- State: Rajasthan
- Country: india
- Assembly constituency: Bilara Assembly constituency
- Lok Sabha constituency: Pali parliamentary constituency

Government
  - Type: Gram Panchayat
  - Sarpanch (Village head): Sampat Ji

Area
  - Village: 5,428.7 ha (13,415 acres)

Dimensions
  - Length: 5 km (3.1 mi)
  - Width: 6 km (3.7 mi)
- Elevation: 302 m (991 ft)

Population (2011)
  - Village: 8,418
  - Rural: 8,418

Transport Connectivity
  - Nearby Railway Station: Pipar Railway Station
  - Nearest Airport: Jodhpur Airport

Crops
  - Kharif: Bajra, maije, jawar, groundnut
  - Rabi: Barley, wheat, gram, pulses, mustard
- Pin Code: 342601
- Post office: Ransi gaon
- Telephone Code: 02930
- ISO 3166 code: RJ-IN
- Vehicle registration: RJ-19 / RJ-54
- Vernacular language: Marwadi
- Official language: Hindi
- Assembly MLA: Arjun Lal Garg
- Parliament MP: P. P. Choudhary

Ransi Gaon is a village located in the Bilara tehsil of Jodhpur District, in the Indian state of Rajasthan. Stud farms are present there.

It is known for the Marwari horse, and the village conducts a fair for it each year.

The village is rich in limestone. The village has a population of 8,488. Ransi Gaon has its own gram panchayat.

The village is flanked by an old, supposedly haunted stepwell, known as 'Bhuto Ki Bawri'.

== History ==
According to legend, Jai Singh, after winning a wrestling match with a ghost near Natiyali Nadi near the village, tied him in chains and built a palace for himself along with a well. Due to a broken promise between the ghost and the Thakur, a part of the well and the two-story palace remained incomplete. This well was built with 16 poles by carving artwork on Lal Ghat stone.
