= Bhindar Kalan =

- village
- Location within Pakistan
- Coordinates: 32°30′27″N 73°41′29″E
- Country: Pakistan
- Province: Punjab
- District: Mandi Bahauddin

Population
  - Total: 2,000

Bhindar Kalan is a village in Mandi Bahauddin District, in the Punjab province of Pakistan. The village is situated 30 kilometres (19 mi) southeast of the district capital of Mandi Bahauddin, and 14 kilometres (8.7 mi) east of the town of Phalia. The population is about 2000. The literacy rate is above 80%. The village is in a well-cultivated area. The main crops are wheat, rice, and sugarcane. Most people of the village are either farmers and some are government servants.
