= Mandoli, Rajasthan =

Village in Jalore district, Rajasthan, India

Coordinates: 25°03′N 72°34′E

Mandoli is a village in Jalore district of Rajasthan state in India. It is known mainly for the Jain temple dedicated to Guru Shri Shantivijay Surishwarji. The village lies on the Jalore-Bhinmal bus route 35 km from Jalore and 5 km from Ramsin.
