= Sadulshahar =

Sadulshahar Matili
- Town
- Nickname: Mandi
- Location in Rajasthan, India Sadulshahar (India)
- Coordinates: 29.9434°N 74.1875°E
- Country: India
- State: Rajasthan
- District: Ganganagar
- Tehsil: Sadulshahar
- Named for: Maharaja Sardul Singh

Government
  - Body: Nagar Palika

Population (2011)
  - Total: 25,465
- Time zone: UTC+5:30 (IST)
- ISO 3166 code: RJ-IN

Sadulshahar is a town and a municipality in Sri Ganganagar district in the Indian state of Rajasthan.

== History ==
The town is named after Maharaja Sardul Singh, son of Maharaja Ganga Singh, who established it. It is a great agriculture based industry centre in Rajasthan. This town is situated on the border of Punjab and Rajasthan. It is a peaceful town in SriGanganagar which was part of the Bikaner State before Independence. According to the people, a large village named "Matili" was transformed into Sadulshahar after 1947.

It was under the supervision of the 19-year-old Maharaja Ganga Singh who, after witnessing the miseries of the great 1899 famine, vowed to end starvation by building a canal in his State. The British pussyfooted, refusing water rights from the Sutlej River in Punjab. Ganga Singh persevered and raised a loan of 15 million for his irrigation scheme. The Ganges Canal, begun in 1921, was completed in 1927. One of the longest concrete lined canals in the world, it has changed the desert's face around Ganganagar. It's a testimony to land transformation: Desert land was converted to a lush green town, credited to the efforts of the Maharaja who brought the Gang canal which carries the waters from Punjab and Himachal Pradesh to the region. Bumper crops of wheat, cotton, mustard, and citrus fruit have generated industry and a building boom. The majority of the population are Sikhs and Hindus, while only a few people constituting other sects stay here.

== Work profile ==
Out of total population, 9,395 were engaged in work or business activity. Of this, 7,218 were males while 2,177 were females. In census survey, worker is defined as person who does business, job, service, and cultivator and labour activity. Of total 9395 working population, 82.78 % were engaged in Main Work while 17.22 % of total workers were engaged in Marginal Work.

== Demographics ==
In the 2001 India census, Sadulshahar (Sardul Shahar) recorded a population of 22,326. Males constituted 53% of the population and females 47%. Sadulshahar had an average literacy rate of 62%, higher than the national average of 59.5%: male literacy was 69%, and female literacy was 53%. In 2001 in Sadulshahar, 14% of the population was under 6 years of age.

The Sadulshahar Municipality has a population of 24,980 of which 13,109 are males while 11,871 are females as per report released by Census India 2011.

Population of Children with age of 0–6 is 3260 which is 13.05 % of total population of Sadulshahar (M). In Sadulshahar Municipality, the female sex ratio is 906 against state average of 928. Moreover, the child sex ratio in Sadulshahar is around 859 compared to Rajasthan state average of 888. literacy rate of Sadulshahar city is 74.30 % higher than the state average of 66.11 %. In Sadulshahar, male literacy is around 82.40 % while the female literacy rate is 65.41%

== Religion ==
Religion in Sadulshahar city(2011 census)
Religion	Percent
Hinduism	55.1%
Sikhism	38.8%
Others	7.1%

== Transport ==
The town is well-connected through railroad. The following trains halt at Sadulshahar railway station in both directions:

14601/02 Firozpur Cantonment–Hanumangarh Junction-Firozpur Cantonment (via Fazilka, Abohar, shriganganagar) Express,

22981/82 Kota–Shri Ganganagar-KotaSuperfast (Bikaner, Jaipur) Express,

12439/40 Hazur Sahib Nanded–Shri Ganganagar-Hajur Sahib Nanded (via Mandi Dabwali, New Delhi, Agra, Bhopal) Express,

14701/02 Amrapur Aravali (Sriganganagar-Bandra terminal Mumbai- Sriganganagar via Jaipur, Ajmer, Ahmedabad) Express

04706/07 Jaipur-Sriganganagar-Jaipur Special Express (via Loharu, Jhunjhunu)

14727/28 Sriganganagar-Tilak Brize Delhi- Sriganganagar Express (via Hanumangarh, Sadulpur, Rewari)

05635/36 Guwahati-Sriganganagar-Guwahati fare special Express (via Hajipur, Gorakhpur, Ayodya Dham, Kanpur, Lucknow, Mathura, Bharatpur, Jaipur, Churu)

04763/64 Sriganganagar-Sadulpur-Sriganganagar special passenger

04767/68 Sriganganagar-Hanumangarh-Sriganganagar special passenger etc.

STATE HIGHWAYS.

SH-7B Sri Ganganagar to Sadulshahar

SH-7A Hanumangarh to Abohor via Sadulshahar

SH-102 Sadulshahar-Chaiya via Sangriya

And a new highway from Sadulshahr to Pakka-Saharana

There is DTO office and The transport district code of Sadulshahar DTO office is RJ-56.
