= State Highway 24 (Rajasthan) =

Road in Rajasthan, India

State Highway 24

Route information
- Length: 78.60 km (48.84 mi)

Major junctions
- From: Bhadoti Mod, Rajasthan
- To: Bassi, Rajasthan

Location
- Country: India
- State: Rajasthan
- Districts: Rajasthan: Dausa district, Jaipur district, Sawai Madhopur district
- Primary destinations: Lalsot, Tunga

Highway system
- Roads in India; Expressways; National; State; Asian; State Highways in Rajasthan

State Highway 24 ( RJ SH 24) is a State Highway in Rajasthan state of India that connects Bhadoti Mod, Rajasthan with Bassi, Rajasthan. The total length of RJ SH 10 is 78.60 km.
