= Jastana =

- Village
- Location within Rajasthan Location within India
- Coordinates: 26°16′45″N 75°53′34″E
- Country: India
- State: Rajasthan
- District: Sawai Madhopur

Population (2011)
  - Total: 3,451

Demographics
  - Literacy: 67.42
  - Sex ratio: 878

Jastana village is located in Bonli tehsil of Sawai Madhopur district, Rajasthan, India.
