= Gangapur City =

City in Rajasthan, India

Gangapur गंगापुर सिटी
- City
- Gangapur City
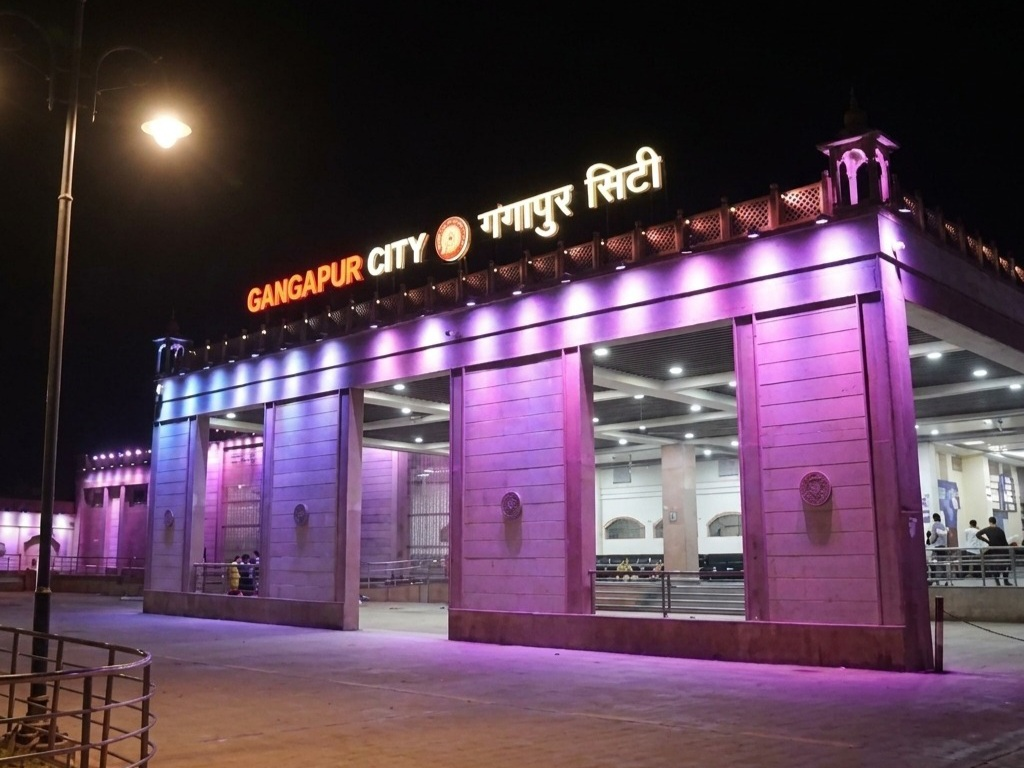
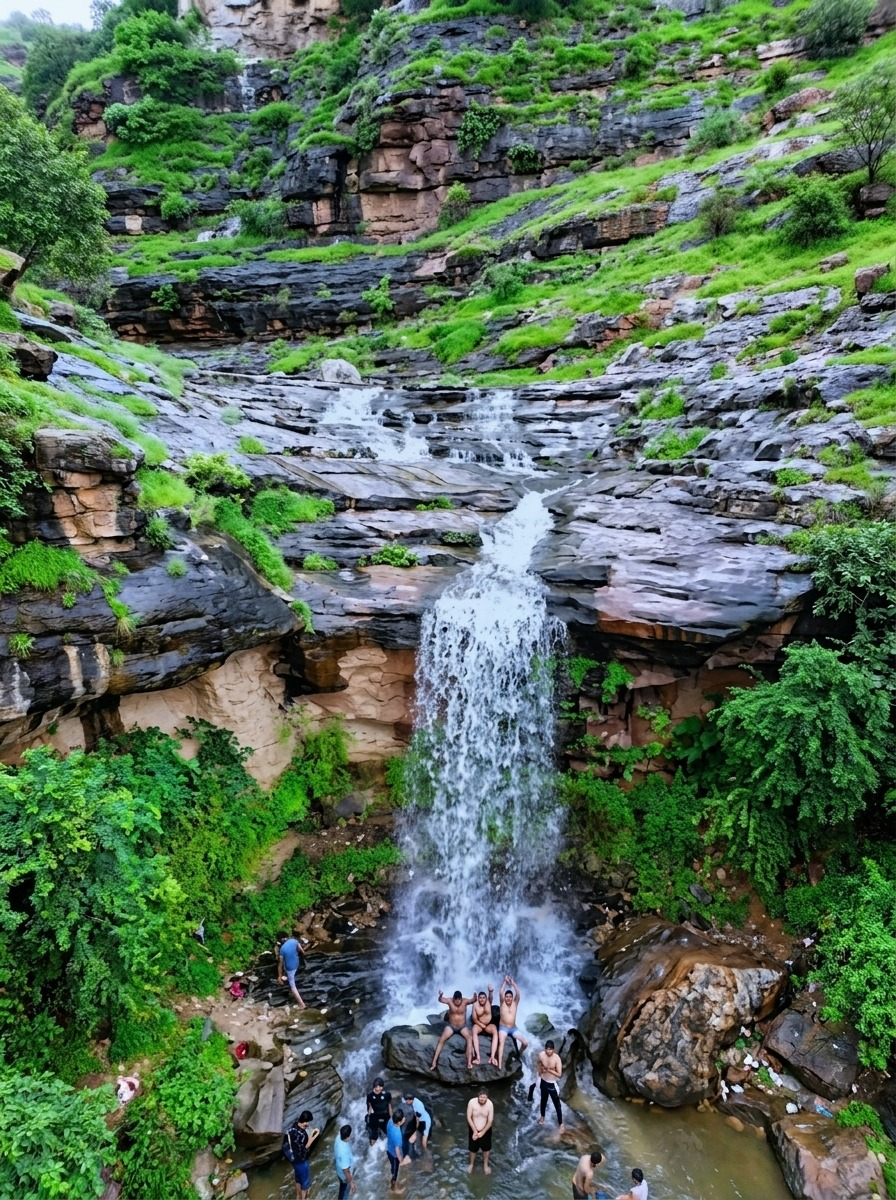
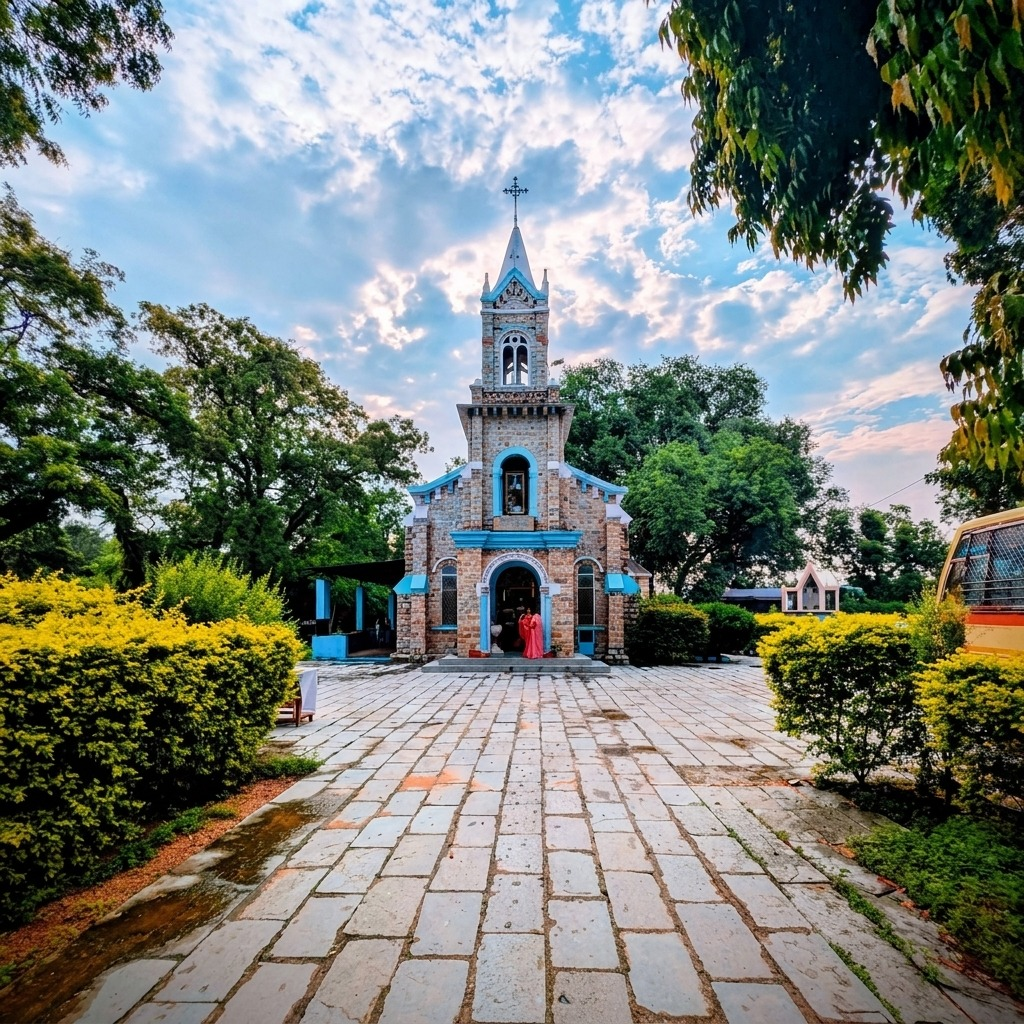
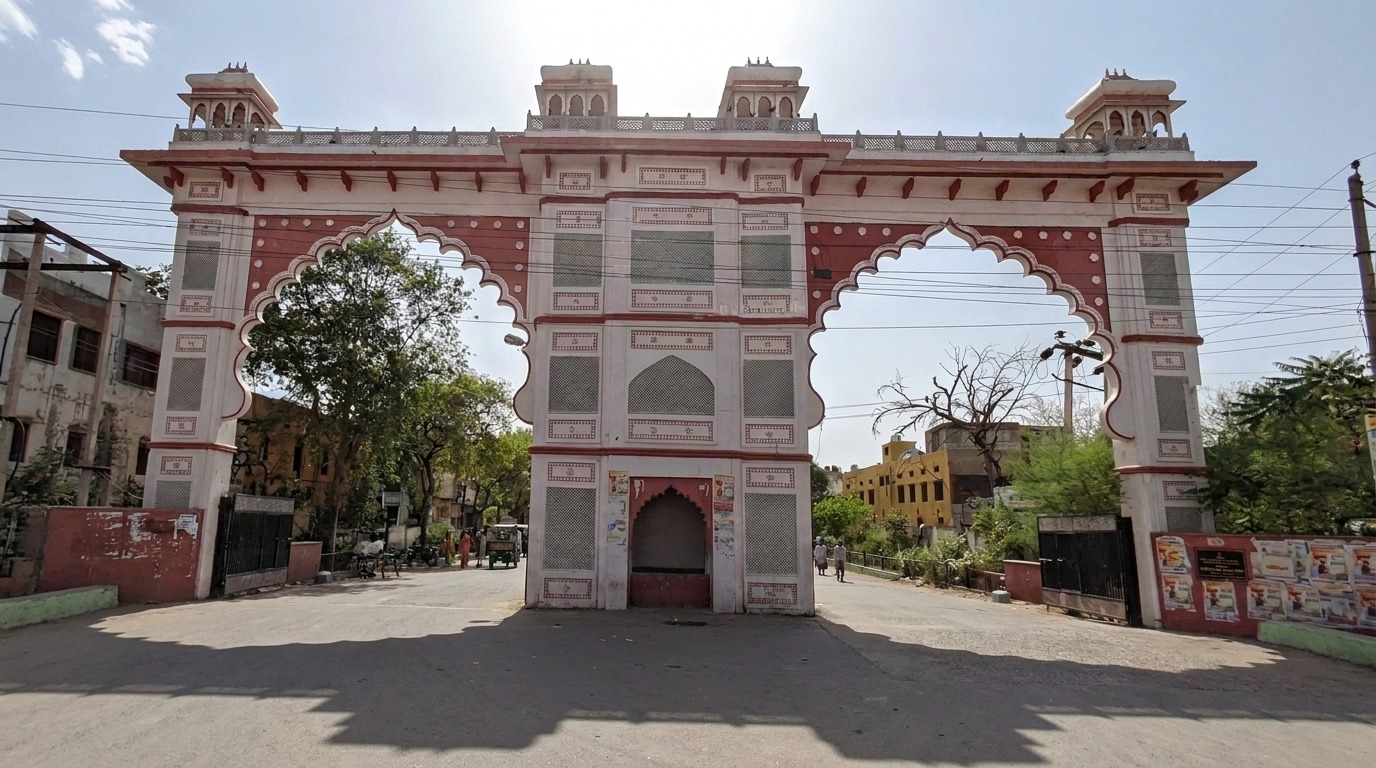
- Gangapur City Junction railway station Dhundeshwar Dham Waterfall St. Peter's Church Nayi Anaj Mandi
- Nickname: Kushalgarh
- India Gangapur (India)
- Coordinates: 26.47171°N 76.71594°E
- Country: India
- State: Rajasthan
- District: Sawai Madhopur
- Kushalgarh: 1757 CE
- Founder: Raja Kushaliram Haldiya
- Named for: Gangaram (brother of Raja Kushaliram)

Government
  - Type: Municipal Council
  - Body: Gangapur City Municipal Council
  - MLA: Ramkesh Meena (INC)
  - Chairman: Vacant

Area
  - Total: 32 km^{2} (12 sq mi)
- Elevation: 260 m (850 ft)

Population (2023)
  - Total: 165,000
  - Density: 5,200/km^{2} (13,000/sq mi)

Languages
  - Official: Hindi
  - Native: Braj Bhasha, Dhundhari (Rajasthani)
- Time zone: UTC+5:30 (IST)
- PIN: 322201,322202
- Telephone code: 07463
- Vehicle registration: RJ-25
- Sex ratio: 892 per 1000 ♂/♀
- Website: https://gangapurcity.rajasthan.gov.in/home/dptHome

Gangapur City is a municipal council located in Sawai Madhopur district in the eastern part of Indian state of Rajasthan. It is situated 140 km (87 mi) east of Rajasthan's capital Jaipur, 76 km (47 mi) from Sawai Madhopur, 33 km (20 mi) from Karauli, 160 km (99 mi) from Agra of Uttar Pradesh. It is famous for its sweet cuisine Kheermohan and newly built Kushalgarh Baba Shyam Temple.

Gangapur City holds a strategic position due to its location on the Delhi–Mumbai railway route, making it an important transportation hub. The city is well-connected to major urban centers like Jaipur, Kota, and Agra. Its proximity to attractions like Ranthambore National Park adds to its importance in the area.

== History ==
Gangapur was reportedly named Kushalgarh (Hindi: कुशालगढ़); by King Kushaliram Haldiya. Gangapur took its current name from Kushaliram's brother, Gangaram. Historically Gangapur City was the cultural capital of Jaipur State and was known as "The Jugad of the East".

== Geography ==
Gangapur City is located in the eastern part of Rajasthan; it is situated 140 km from Jaipur (The capital of Rajasthan). The city's area is about 25 km² and has an average elevation of 1,624 feet.

== Demographics ==
The 2011 Census of India considered Gangapur City as an urban agglomeration. The city has a population of apx. 165,000 in the year 2023; males constitute 53% of the population and females constitute 47%.

Population growth through the years
Year	Population
1891	15,443
1901	18,567
1941	20,456
1951	25,566
1961	47,678
1971	60,457
1981	75,456
1991	89,789
2001	107,459
2011	125,447
2021	154,000
2023	165,000

=== Language ===
Hindi is the Official Language of Gangapur City and here a mixture of Braj Bhasha and Dhundhari (Rajasthani) is primarily spoken.

=== Literacy rates ===
The average literacy rate in Gangapur is 82.12%.

=== Religions ===
Hinduism is majority religion in Gangapur City, with 71.91% of the city as followers. Islam is the second most common religion, with 26.32% following it in the city.

Religion	Total	Percentage
Hindu	1,18,651	71.91%
Muslims	43,428	26.32%
Jain	1,617	0.98%
Not Stated	858	0.52%
Christian	247	0.15%
Sikh	132	0.08%
Buddhist	66	0.04%
Others	7	0.004%

== Climate ==
Gangapur City is in a subtropical dry climate that experiences summer, winter, and the wet season. Temperature may rise above 40°C in summers and can be low as 5°C in winters. The average precipitation is 24.48 cm. Humidity is about 5–10% in summers and rises to about 75% in rainy seasons.

Climate data for Gangapur City
Month	Jan	Feb	Mar	Apr	May	Jun	Jul	Aug	Sep	Oct	Nov	Dec	Year
Mean daily maximum °C (°F)	20 (68)	25 (77)	34 (93)	38 (100)	41 (106)	48 (118)	36 (97)	34 (93)	36 (97)	36 (97)	31 (88)	27 (81)	34 (93)
Mean daily minimum °C (°F)	8 (46)	12 (54)	18 (64)	23 (73)	27 (81)	29 (84)	27 (81)	26 (79)	25 (77)	20 (68)	15 (59)	9 (48)	20 (68)
Average precipitation cm (inches)	0.35 (0.14)	0.27 (0.11)	0.32 (0.13)	0.35 (0.14)	0.6 (0.2)	3.26 (1.28)	8.89 (3.50)	6.44 (2.54)	3.42 (1.35)	0.45 (0.18)	0.07 (0.03)	0.06 (0.02)	24.48 (9.62)
Source: Foreca

== Business ==
Major industries are related to Food processing and Agro Processing sector. Gangapur City is famous for its sweet Kheermohan (खीरमोहन).

== Administration and politics ==
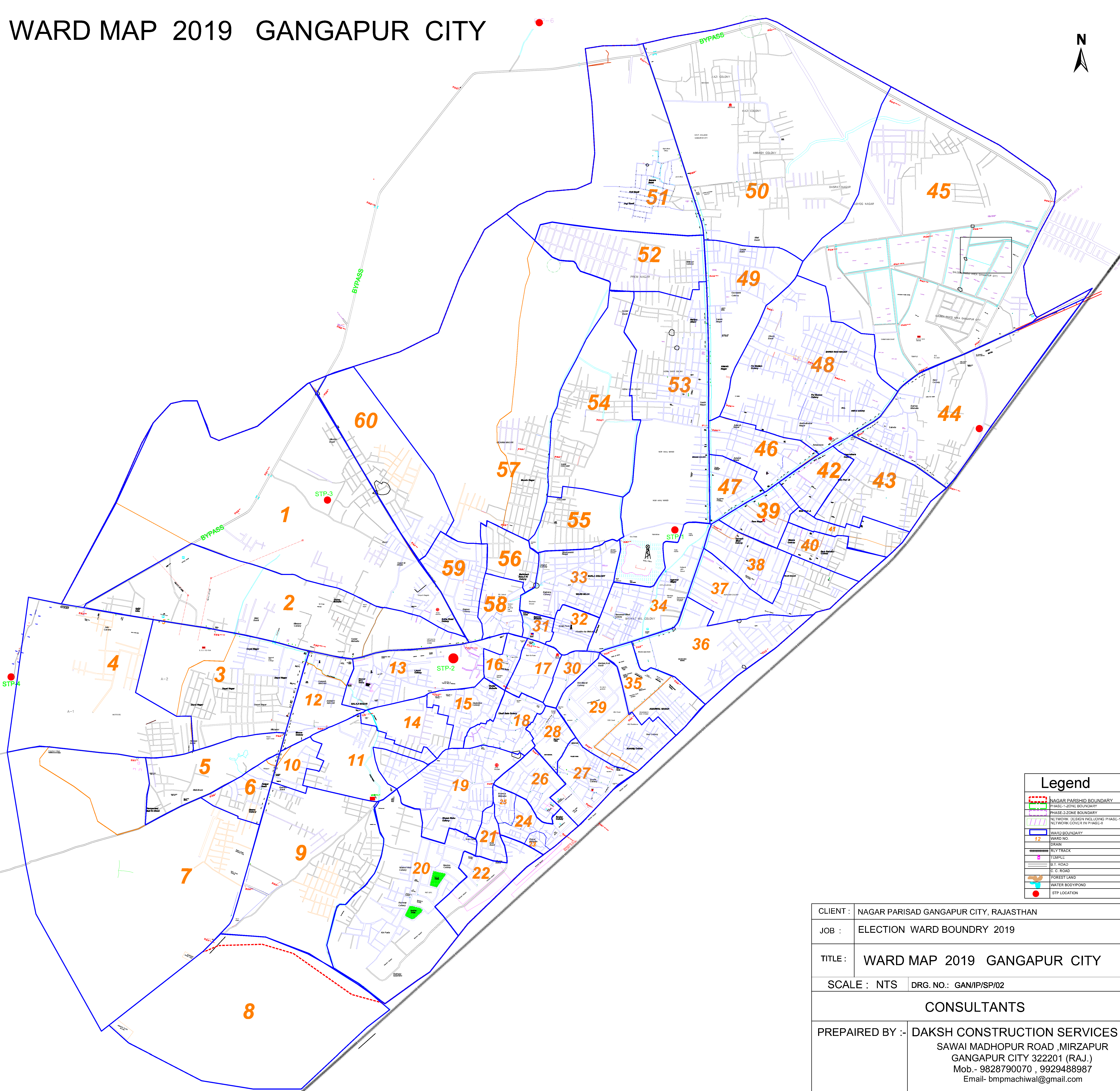
Gangapur city wards map

- Gangapur City had 40 wards before 2019, currently it has 60 wards.
- It is part of Gangapur, Rajasthan Assembly constituency.
- It is part of Tonk–Sawai Madhopur Lok Sabha constituency.

== Transportation ==
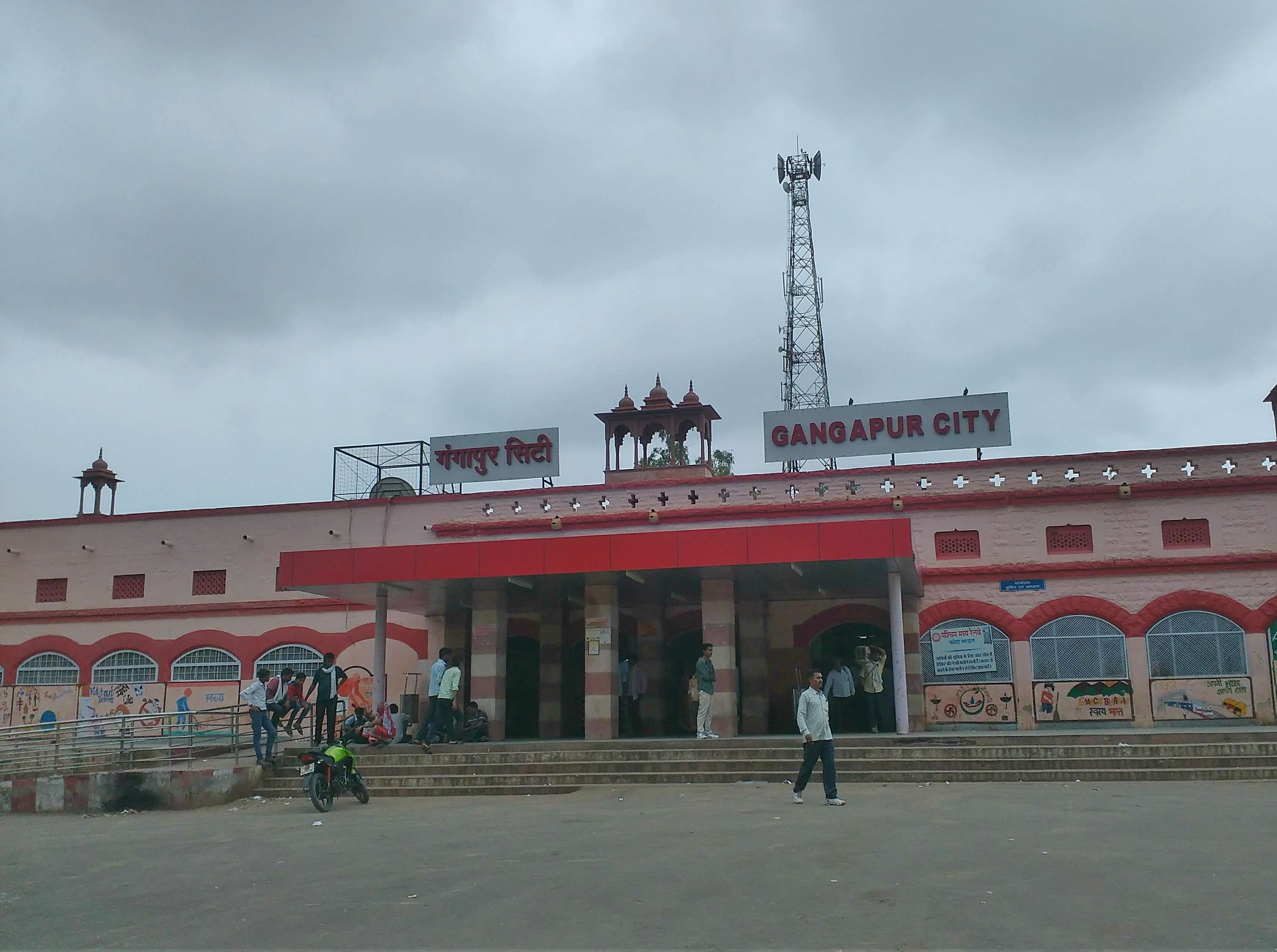
Gangapur City railway station entrance

=== Railways ===
Gangapur City is a railway station on the Delhi–Kota–Vadodara–Mumbai railway line and it is abbreviated as GGC. Many of the major trains on this route stop at the station. It is in the West Central Railway Zone under the Kota Division. Gangapur City is directly connected to major cities like Delhi, Mumbai, Jaipur, Kota, Agra, Indore, Mathura, Patna, Jammu, Amritsar, and Udaipur.

Station also serve as only railway source to places like Karauli, Sapotara, Bamanwas, Lalsot, Kailadevi, Piplai which did not have railway connectivity.

A new railway line is being constructed between Dausa and Gangapur City to connect Gangapur City to the Ahmedabad Junction railway station, in order to decrease travel time to cities like Jaipur, Jodhpur, and Ahmedabad and provide railway connectivity to areas like Lalsot, Piplai, and Bamanwas. Currently DEMU Trains and Goods Trains run on this route.

Another railway line has been proposed between Dholpur and Gangapur City to connect Gangapur City to the Delhi–Bhopal–Mumbai rail route and to provide connectivity to Karauli.

=== Roadways ===
Gangapur city is close to newly built delhi mumbai expressway. Gangapur City has a Rajasthan roadways bus stand for Rajasthan government buses and a private bus stand for privately owned buses. Gangapur City has regular government and private buses to cities like Jaipur, Dausa, Karauli, Dholpur, Gwalior, Ajmer, Pushkar, Hindaun, Alwar, Bikaner, Bhilwara, Sikar and Sawai Madhopur.

Major roads passing through Gangapur City are:

- National Highway 23: Dholpur–Karauli–Gangapur–Lalsot–Kothun
- Rajasthan SH-1: Jhalawar–Kota–Sawai Madhopur–Gangapur City–Bharatpur
- Rajasthan SH-25: Gangapur City–Sikandra–Bandikui–Rajgarh–Alwar–Tijara–Bhiwadi–Daruhera

The distances of major cities from Gangapur City are:

- Jaipur: 141 km
- Sawai Madhopur: 75 km
- Bharatpur: 145 km
- Mathura: 180 km
- Agra: 160 km
- Kota: 206 km
- Indore: 570 km
- New Delhi: 238 km
- Udaipur: 458 km
- Ajmer: 274 km
- Karauli: 34 km
- Gwalior: 203 km
- Alwar: 142 km
- Dausa: 85 km
- Sikar: 265 km

=== Airways ===
The nearest airports to the city are Jaipur International Airport in Jaipur and Indira Gandhi International Airport in New Delhi.

== See also ==
- Rajasthan
- Sawai Madhopur
- Sawai Madhopur district
- List of urban local bodies in Rajasthan
- List of districts of Rajasthan
- Gangapur, Rajasthan Assembly constituency
- Lakshya Beniwal
