= Bapawar Kalan =

Town in Rajasthan, India

Coordinates: 24°55′36″N 76°25′57″E

Bapawar Kalan is a small town in the southeast part of the Indian state of Rajasthan. It is located around 37 kilometers south of the Kota district headquarter. It has a railway station, a hospital, schools, markets, and roads for traffic. The people of Bapawar Kalan primarily engage in agricultural activities.

== Literacy ==
There is a gender gap in literacy rates in Bapawar Kalan, with male literacy standing at 87.21% compared to female literacy at 61.10%.

Village/Town	Literacy Rate (2011)	Male Literacy Rate	Female Literacy Rate
Bapawar Kalan	74.69%	87.21%	61.10%

== Population ==
According to the 2011 Population Census, the village has a total population of 7,170, with 3,729 male residents and 3,441 female residents. There are a total of 1,416 families residing in the village.
