= Kalandri =

- City
- Location in Rajasthan, India Kalandri (India)
- Coordinates: 24°56′0″N 72°41′0″E
- Country: India
- State: Rajasthan
- District: Sirohi

Government
  - Body: Gram Panchayat
- Time zone: UTC+5:30 (IST)
- Postal code: 307802
- ISO 3166 code: RJ-IN
- Vehicle registration: RJ-24
- Coastline: 0 kilometres (0 mi)

Kalandri is a city in Sirohi District, Rajasthan, India. It is located about 15 km west of Sirohi. Kalandari is the headquarters of a sub tehsil of the district. The Jawahar Navodaya Vidyalaya of Sirohi district is based here.
