= Barrod =

- Location within Rajasthan Location within India
- Coordinates: 27°53′41″N 76°22′05″E
- Country: India
- State: Rajasthan
- District: Kotputli-Behror/Rath
- Subdistrict: Behror

Population
  - Total: 100,000
- Time zone: UTC+05:30 (IST)
- Pincode: 301020
- ISO 3166 code: RJ-IN

Barrod is a village in Behror Tehsil, Kotputli-Behror/Rath district, Rajasthan, India. Some times this is also called Bardod. It is situated on State Highway No-14, RJ SH 14. The name is sometimes written as Bardod. Two villages come under the administration of the Barrod panchayat: Barrod and Kankara Barrod. It is considered as the largest village in Alwar District hence given the Nagar Palika stature recently for its better welfare and development.

Major Castes:

Bardod village is primarily inhabited by Mali (Saini), Chauhan (Rajput), Brahmins, Baniyas, Potters, Barbers, Meenas, Jats, Dhankas, Dhobis, Banjaras, Balmikis, Harijans, Goldsmiths, Khatiks, Blacksmiths, Carpenters, Tailors, etc.

Major Historical Places:

1. Chamunda Mata Temple is located on a hill.

2. The historical fort is located on a hill.

3. Panchmukhi Mahadev Ancient Temple

4. Goga Ji Ancient Temple

5. Shahji's Chhatri

6. Clock Tower

Major Buildings:

1. Community Health Center, Bardod (inaugurated by the Honorable, first President of India, Dr. Rajendra Prasad)

2. Government Bhimraj Higher Secondary School

3. Municipal Building, Bardod

4. Seth Roodmal Dharamshala

5. Dharamshala of Dhatriyas

6. Haveli of Dhatriyas

7. Saini Samaj Bhawan

Major Technology Institute:

1. Capital Institute of Computer Education, Bardod (near the old Panchayat Bhawan)
