= Rudawal =

- Town
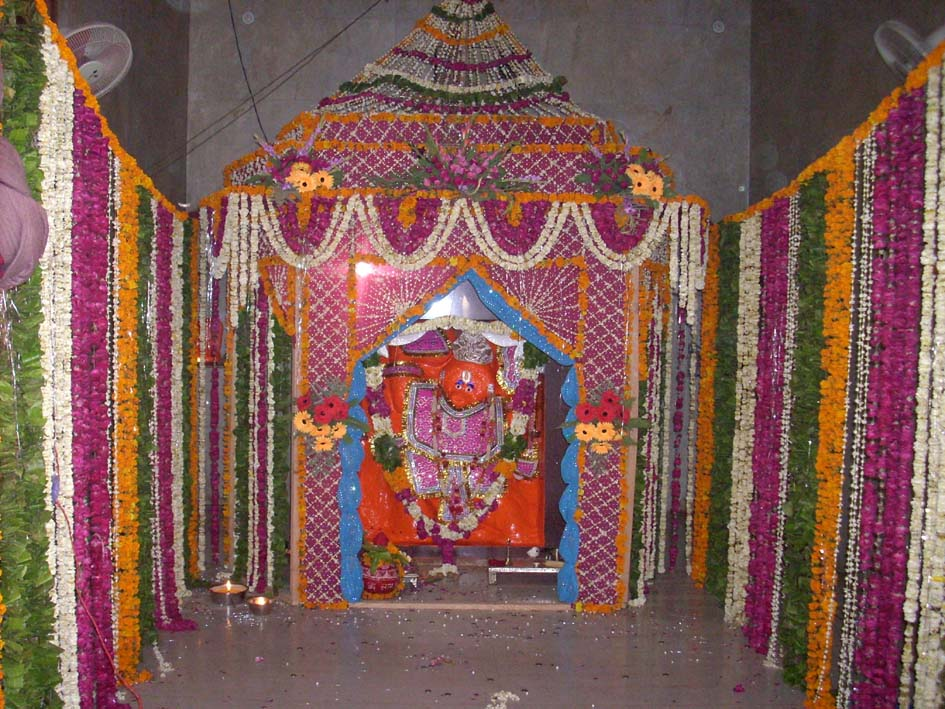
- Hanumaan Ji

- Location within Rajasthan Location within India
- Coordinates: 26.964268°N 77.422071°E
- Country: India
- State: Rajasthan
- District: Bharatpur

Government
  - Sarpanch: Jasmati Devi

Area
  - Total: 11,117.8 km^{2} (4,292.6 sq mi)
- Elevation: 431 m (1,414 ft)

Population (2011)
  - Total: 12,034

Languages
  - Official: Hindi
  - Spoken: Hindi, Brij Bhasha
- Time zone: UTC+5:30 (IST)
- PIN: 321402
- Telephone code: 915645
- Vehicle registration: RJ-05

Rudawal is a town in Rupbas sub-division of Bharatpur district, Rajasthan.

== History ==
The town was estimated or it was founded on 1700. The Palace quarter encloses a sprawling Lack, (Bandh Baretha), formal gardens, and a small lake. crowns the hill in the northwest corner of the town. The Hanumaan Ji Temple is one of the India's Heritage Sites. Included on the Golden Triangle tourist circuit, along with Delhi and Agra, Gwaliwar Rudawal is an extremely popular tourist destination in Rajasthan and India.

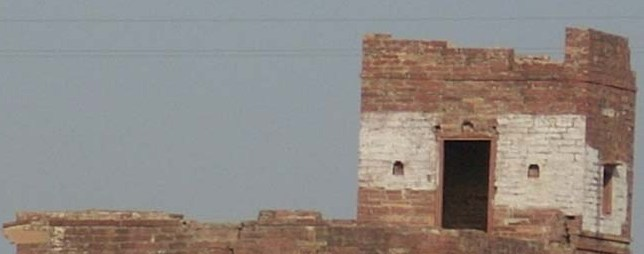
Mughal Garhi, c. 1880

In ancient time Bharatpur region came under the Mughal Kingdom.

Modern Rudawal was founded in 1808 by Maharaja Roop Singh of Rupwas. Initially, his Tahsil was Tahsil, which lies 17 km from Rudawal. The senior citizen is says that At 1527 the time of the Battle of Khanwa Tofkhane Mughals were made. The soil is still out in their rems.

Rudawal is a centre for both traditional and modern industries. It is famous as a large exporter of sandstone, stone in Asia and is the only Town finishing sandstone, or Jali and Piller, in the world.

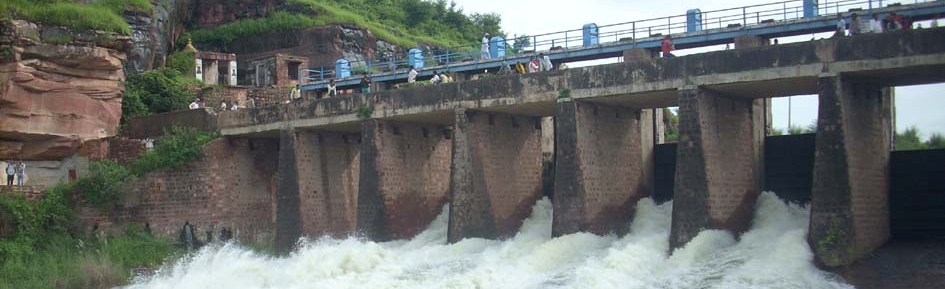
Bandh Baretha, the palace on Bandh Baretha Lake.

== Art & Culture ==
In an area of art & Culture Rudwal is very ahead. It had a different impression in art. It is known for the pink stone carving.

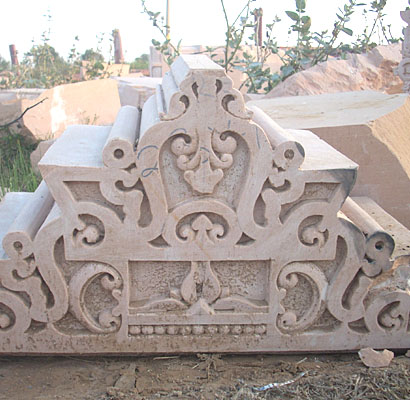
Banshi pahadpur Stone Carving. demo image, use for indian temple.

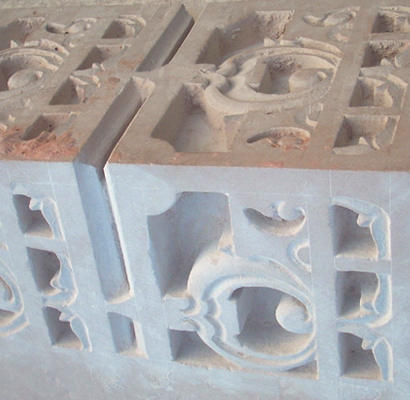
Banshi pahadpur Stone Carving. demo image, use for indian temple.

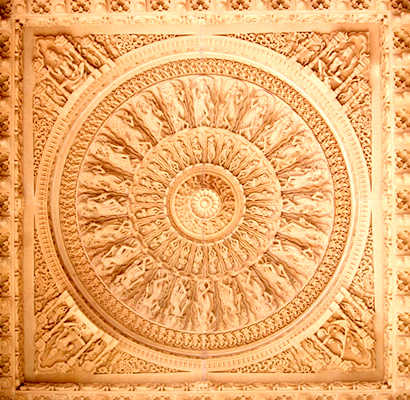
Banshi pahadpur Stone Carving. demo image, use for indian temple.

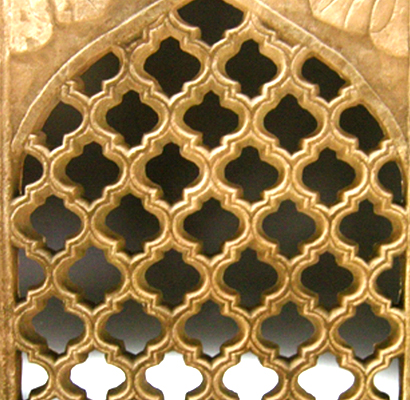
jali. Stone carving rudawal
