= State Highway 22 (Rajasthan) =

State Highway in Rajasthan

State Highway 22

Route information
- Length: 60 km (37 mi)

Major junctions
- From: Mandrayal, Rajasthan
- To: Pahadi, Rajasthan

Location
- Country: India
- State: Rajasthan
- Districts: Rajasthan: Dausa district, Gudla, भगतपुरा Karauli district, Alwar district, Bharatpur district
- Primary destinations: Karauli, Nagar, Hindaun, [[Mahuwa, Phaili ka puraRajasthan|Mahuwa]], Kathoomar Kherli

Highway system
- Roads in India; Expressways; National; State; Asian; State Highways in Rajasthan

State Highway 22 ( RJ SH 22) is a State Highway in Rajasthan state of India that connects Mandrayal of Dausa district, Rajasthan, with Pahadi, Rajasthan of Rajasthan. The total length of RJ SH 10 is 60 km.
