= Jawal =

- village
- Location in Rajasthan, India Jawal (India)
- Coordinates: 24.9833°N 72.7333°E
- Country: India
- State: Rajasthan
- District: Sirohi
- Talukas: Sirohi

Government
  - Body: Gram Panchayat
- Elevation: 231 m (758 ft)

Population (2011)
  - Total: 10,293

Languages
  - Official: Hindi, Rajasthani
- Time zone: UTC+5:30 (IST)
- PIN: 307801
- Vehicle registration: RJ-24
- Lok Sabha constituency: Jalore (Lok Sabha Constituency)
- Vidhan Sabha constituency: Sirohi
- Civic agency: Gram Panchayat

Jawal is a village situated in Sirohi tehsil of Sirohi District of Rajasthan in Western India. It lies on Jalore - Sirohi Highway, 15 km north of Sirohi and 60 km south of Jalore.

== Demographics ==
Jawal is a village located in Sirohi Tehsil of Sirohi district, Rajasthan with total 2031 families residing. The Jawal village has population of 10293 of which 5174 are males while 5119 are females as per Population Census 2011.

In Jawal village population of children with age 0-6 is 1401 which makes up 13.61% of total population of village. Average Sex Ratio of Jawal village is 989 which is higher than Rajasthan state average of 928. Child Sex Ratio for the Jawal as per census is 893, higher than Rajasthan average of 888.

Jawal village has lower literacy rate compared to Rajasthan. In 2011, literacy rate of Jawal village was 59.36% compared to 66.11% of Rajasthan. In Jawal Male literacy stands at 74.92% while female literacy rate was 43.88%.

Jawal on Google Map

== Temples and spiritual places to visit ==
- Neel-Kanth Mahadev Temple, Jawal
- Sanchiyav Mata Temple, Jawal
- Hanuman Temple, Jawal
- Bayosa Temple, Jawal www.bayosamataji.hpage.com (on Sirohi Road)
- Bayosa Temple, Jawal (on Kalandri Road)
- Ramdev Temple, Jawal
- Lord Narsingh Temple, Jawal
- Ganesh Temple, Jawal (Under Construction)
- Maya Guru Ji Temple, Jawal
- Moma Ji Temple, Jawal
- Charbhuja Temple, Jawal
- Ashapura Temple, Jawal
- Thakur Ji Temple (Dwara), Jawal
- Garh Ganjna Temple (Goga Ji), Jawal (Under Construction)
- Mata Ambaji Temple
- Sarneshwar Mahadev Mandir, Narnewala Farm.
- Other Four Jain Temples is Shree Parshwanath, Sumtinath, Chandraprabhu Swami & Shantinath, Jawal

== Market ==
Road from "New Bus Stand to Kabutar Chowk" is mainly covered by "Neel-Kanth Complex" as a market of home, perfumery, stationary, foot wear, cosmetic, cloth/textile, plastic etc. item sellers. Market is also broad from "Kabutar Chowk to Ramdev Temple" side and this part covered by sweet shops, tea stalls, stationers, jewelers, pan corners, kiryana stores and some metal sheet workers.

market is situated at right angles of main market and that is from "New Bus Stand to Kalandri Road and Harji Road". This road is mainly known as a "Vishwakarma Path". On this path main shops and complex are about electrics, electronics, cements, metal and steel, furniture, tractors and auto parts, mechanical and electrical workers, tours and travels agencies, tools, cloths, petrol and diesel, printers, pvt. bankers, geraj shops, home item sellers and dealers are there.
