= Brij Nagar =

- Town
- Location in Rajasthan, India Brij Nagar (India)
- Coordinates: 27.42473°N 77.09946°E
- Country: India
- State: Rajasthan
- District: Deeg

Government
  - Type: Municipal Corporation
  - Body: Municipality
- Elevation: 304 m (997 ft)

Population (2011)
  - Total: 25,572

Languages
  - Official: Hindi
  - Regional: Brij Bhasha
- Time zone: UTC+5:30 (IST)
- PIN: 321205
- ISO 3166 code: RJ-IN
- Vehicle registration: RJ-05

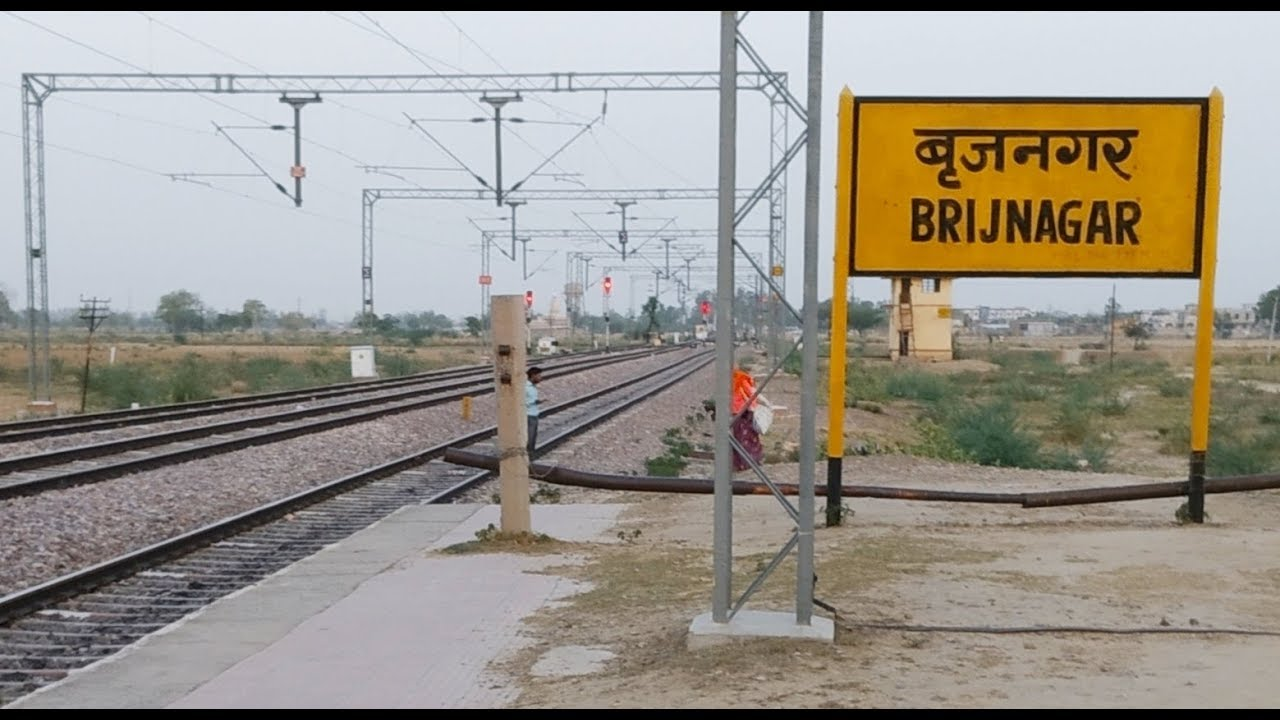

Brij Nagar (previously known as Nagar or नगर) is a town and the headquarters of 'Brij Nagar tehsil' in Deeg district, in the Indian state of Rajasthan. It lies in the Braj–Mewat cultural transition zone, roughly midway between Bharatpur, Alwar and Mathura. The town marks the meeting point of the Brij and Mewat cultural regions, it is locally referred to as "Brij aur Mewat ki sangam sthali" (“the confluence place of Braj and Mewat”). The town is noted for its large spiral sweet known as Jaleba, a bigger version of Jalebi, and for the Ram Navami fair held each spring.

== Geography ==
Brij Nagar is located at 27°25'25.2"N 77°05'51.4"E in eastern Rajasthan, close to the border with Uttar Pradesh.The town stands at an elevation of about 200 metres (660 ft) above sea level and is situated on the plains between Bharatpur, Alwar and Mathura. Distance from Delhi is roughly around 165 km and from Jaipur it is 175 km.

Administratively, Brij Nagar forms the urban centre of Nagar tehsil in Deeg district, which includes one town and more than 170 surrounding villages.

== History and administration ==
The area around present-day Nagar historically formed part of Bharatpur State, a Jat-ruled princely state centred on Bharatpur and Deeg during the 18th and 19th centuries.

After Indian independence the region was integrated into the state of Rajasthan and Nagar became a town in Bharatpur district.

On 7 August 2023 the Government of Rajasthan created Deeg district by bifurcating Bharatpur; Nagar tehsil, with its headquarters at Brij Nagar, was included in the new district.

Nagar falls under the Nagar Assembly constituency (constituency number 71) of the Rajasthan Legislative Assembly. The seat is part of Bharatpur district and is linked to the Bharatpur Lok Sabha constituency for national elections. As of the most recent 2023 election, the seat is held by Jawahar Singh Bedham of the Bharatiya Janata Party.

== Culture ==
Brij Nagar is known for its oversized jaleba, a sweet similar to jalebi but prepared in much larger spirals. Media reports describe the jaleba made in the town’s sweet shops as being sold daily in large quantities and exported by customers to other parts of India and abroad.

The town also hosts a prominent Ram Navami fair each spring. During the festival a Ram Rath Yatra (chariot procession) passes through the main market to the town’s Ram temple, accompanied by cultural performances, nautanki theatre and kavi sammelan (poets’ gatherings) organised by the municipal authorities and local groups.

== Demographics ==
The Nagar city is divided into 20 wards for which elections are held every 5 years. As per the 2011 Census of India, Brij Nagar Municipality had a total population of 25,572, of which 13,582 were male and 11,990 were female.

Children aged 0–6 years numbered 3,826 (14.96% of the population). The female sex ratio was 883 females per 1,000 males, slightly below the Rajasthan state average of 928, and the child sex ratio was 824. The overall literacy rate of the town was 73.94%, higher than the state average of 66.11%; male literacy stood at 84.8% and female literacy at 61.78%.

The municipality administered 4,207 households and is responsible for providing basic civic amenities such as water supply, sewerage and local road maintenance within its jurisdiction.

Caste-wise, the rural part of Nagar is populated mainly by Pahlwan Gurjars, Jatav, Mev and Jats and the urban part is dominated by Bania, Brahmins, Jatav, Jats and Vaishya. Here the Gurjar (Rajana,chaprana, Kanwar) are dominant.

== Economy ==
Nagar tehsil is predominantly rural, with around 89% of its population living in villages and about 11% in urban areas as of 2011.

Census data indicate that a majority of main workers in the tehsil are engaged in agriculture, either as cultivators or agricultural labourers, with smaller numbers employed in household industries and other sectors.

== Education ==
Government College, Nagar is a co-educational government degree college located on Deeg Road, about 0.5 km from the town bus stand. Established in 2018, it is recognised under sections 2(f) and 12(B) of the University Grants Commission Act and is affiliated to Maharaja Surajmal Brij University, Bharatpur.

The college currently offers undergraduate programmes in arts.

== Transport ==
Brij Nagar is served by Brijnagar railway station (BINR), located on the Alwar–Mathura railway line and operated by the North Central Railway. The station has two platforms and is served by passenger as well as some superfast trains.

By road, the town is linked to Bharatpur, Alwar, Deeg and Mathura by regional roads, and state-run buses of the Rajasthan State Road Transport Corporation (RSRTC) and private operators connect Nagar with larger cities such as Jaipur, Delhi, Aligarh and surrounding district centres.
