= Nainwa =

- city
- Location in Rajasthan, India Nainwa (India)
- Coordinates: 25.77°N 75.85°E
- Country: India
- State: Rajasthan
- District: Bundi
- Named for: Kunver Nain Singh

Government
  - Body: Nagar Palika
- Elevation: 291 m (955 ft)

Population (2011)
  - Total: 35,000 appx(2,011)

Languages
  - Official: Hindi
- Time zone: UTC+5:30 (IST)
- Postal code: 323801

Nainwan is a tehsil of Bundi district and a municipality in the Hadoti region of the state of Rajasthan in India.

== Tourism ==
Tourism attraction in the area include the Talwas Lake.The main source of water in Nainwa is the Paibalapura dam. There is a stadium for various sport opened in 2023 with the request from the MLA and khel mantri of Hindoli constituency Area, Ashok chandna. It is situated in the back of senior high secondary school of nainwan.

== Geography ==
Nainwan is located at 25.77°N 75.85°E. It has an average elevation of 291 metres (954 feet).The town is situated at a distance of 95 km from Kota, 165 km from Jaipur, and 65 km from Bundi. There is no rail network in the town. The nearest railway station is in Indergarh, at a distance of 25 km from Nainwa.

== Demographics ==
As of 2001 census, Nainwa had a population of around 35,172. Males constitute 52% of the population and females 48%. Nainwan has an average literacy rate of 61%, higher than the national average of 59.5%: male literacy is 72%, and female literacy is 48%. In Nainwan, 16% of the population is under 6 years of age.

== History ==
This area was ruled by the ancient Meena tribe.The Meenas of Ajitgarh first came to live in this area in 784 AD. Meena chieftains ruled here till 1191 AD , whose last ruler was Kanwariya Meena.

After this, this area was ruled by Jats and then Hada Rajputs.

The town was named by prince Kunwar Nain Singh.

The town contains many stepwell reservoirs known as baoris. Gadpol, Todapol, Deipol and Khanpol are the four large entrance gates. The town also houses numerous temples, including 10 Jain temples. A large temple in the town is Mansha Puran Ganesh Ji.

The town is the resting place of the king of Bundi.

== Education ==
Bhagvan Adinath Jairaj Marwara College, situated on Nainwan-Kota road, 2 km from main city and affiliated with Kota University. There is a senior secondary school and a secondary school for girls. There are around 50 private schools, out of which more than 5 are of 10+2 level. There is an educational institute EduPoint Classes Nainwa Which provides education for RBSE, CBSE (PCM, PCB, Agriculture, English Compulsory & Literature) and competitive exams. EduPoint Nainwa also provides free education on YouTube channel "EduPoint Nainwa". EduPoint has batches from class 5 to 12.

== Festivals and fair ==
People of Nainwa celebrate many Indian festivals including Bundi Utsav, Teej and Muharram. A fair named Dahelwal Ji takes place in the town. Jajawar jhetal mata mandir is famous for its fair (7 days ). People of Saini caste worship Mataji & mansha purna ganesh ji temple is situated on the bank of the pond. There is a unique festival that only happens in nainwa called haduda that happens on the evening of dhulandi. It includes sexual activities from male youngsters.

== Transportation ==
There is a bus stop in the town, through which many private and more than 50 government buses go. A state highway and a national highway connect the town to the cities of Rajasthan. Nearest large railway stations are in Kota and Sawai Madahopur. Nearest Airport is Sanganer Airport in Jaipur.

== Food ==
Nainva is known for its unique sweet named "Nainwa ka Petha", made with pure ghee. It resembles the Indian sweet Gulab jamun.
