= Kherli =

- Town
- Nickname: Ganj Kherli
- Location in Rajasthan, India Kherli (India)
- Coordinates: 27°20′N 77°4′E
- Country: India
- State: Rajasthan
- District: Alwar

Government
  - Type: Municipality
  - MLA: [Ramesh khichi ]]

Population (2011)
  - Total: 17,634
  - Density: 3,000/km^{2} (7,800/sq mi)

Languages
  - Official: Main language is Hindi local language-Mewati language, Braj Bhasha and Haryanvi language or Khariboli dialect
- Time zone: UTC+5:30 (IST)
- PIN: 321606
- Telephone code: 01492
- ISO 3166 code: RJ-IN
- Vehicle registration: RJ-02
- Sex ratio: 9,435/8,199 ♂/♀
- Website: www.kherli.com

Kherli is a city and a municipality in Alwar district in the Indian state of Rajasthan.Kherli mandi(Grain Market) is the second largest mandi in Rajasthan. Once upon a time it was so much famous that till now old jaipur people knows this as ganj kherli i.e. kherli mandi. Kherli is between the golden triangle where it is nearest to Agra(125 km) Jaipur(150 km) and Delhi(175 km).This area also comes under NCR but still they are not getting benefit of close proximity to these 3 big cities.

== History ==
Kherli is located at 27.2065° N, 77.0338° E. Topography is mainly plains, except some low hills found in western part from this region but those hills are not so big and mainly this area is plain. Elevation of kherli is 210m above sea level.

== Demographics ==
As of 2011 census of India, Kherli has a population of 15,506. Males constitute 53.1% (8,311/15,506) of the population and females 46.4% (7,195/15,506). Kherli has an average literacy rate of 73%, higher than the national average of 62%: Male literacy is 81%, and Female literacy is 65%. In Kherli, 14% of the population is under 6 years of age.

Main castes of kherli is Bania (caste), Meena, Gurjar, Jatav, Brahmin, Jat people, Rajput or Thakur. No caste shows here clear majority but all are in somewhere equal numbers.

Culture and Language of this area shows wide diversity but the local language is somewhat mix of Mewati language and Braj Bhasha. We can see some mix of language and culture of Haryana and Western Uttar Pradesh here because of its location.

Local music and film industry is Haryanvi here. And the local music of this region Rasiya is also popular besides haryanvi music and films.

Kherli represents a conglomerate of more than 20 villages surrounding it, and these villages are integrated by the economy of Kherli town. The farm produce is brought to the grain mandi of Kherli which is a well-known grain mandi (Anaj mandi) of eastern Rajasthan.

There are multiple spiritual places near Kherli, Such as Dholagarh Mata Mandir, DANTWAD is famous for dantwad's temples & parikrima and GHATA-BHABAR is also famous for Hanuman temple.

Transport Railway Kherli is well connected by Indian Railway. It is located between Jaipur-Bandikui-Agra railway line. Road Kherli has a good road connectivity with the nearby cities and is about 12 km from the NH-11. Market Town's main market is stretched from Bajaja bajaar, Jawahar Chowk to the Railway Station.

== Occupation ==
Main occupation of people is agriculture here. People are majorly dependent on agriculture, economy of kherli is based on agriculture from surrounding villages. Agriculture in this area is not dependent on rain because rain is very less in this region which is near 60 cm annual. During kharif season mainly bajra is grown. Tube Well is the main source of irrigation here which constitutes about 95% of total irrigated area. This is the reason why ground water level is gone very deep because of tubewells. Demand of canal extension of Agra Canal and Gurgaon canal to this area from Bharatpur district is very crucial for this area. Main crops grown in this area are Wheat, Mustard, Bajra, Gram. And many fruits and vegetables are grown in this area. Because of medium yield the people are somewhat economically backward because they mostly depend on agriculture but they are not so much backward. That's why they don't mind so much because they earns enough to live happy. Besides agriculture, a significant number of people serve in Government as well as private jobs from this area and a majority of them serve in defence services.
