= National Highway 148D (India) =

National Highway in India

National Highway 148D
- Map of National Highway 148D in red

Route information
- Auxiliary route of NH 48
- Length: 256 km (159 mi)

Major junctions
- West end: Bheem
- NH 48 NH 52
- East end: Uniara

Location
- Country: India
- States: Rajasthan

Highway system
- Roads in India; Expressways; National; State; Asian
← NH 58	→ NH 552

National Highway 148D, commonly referred to as NH 148D is a national highway in India. It is a spur road of National Highway 48. NH-148D traverses the state of Rajasthan in India.

== Route ==
Bheem, Parasoli, Gulabpura, Shahpura, Jahajpur, Hindoli, Gothara, Naniwa, Uniara.

== Junctions ==
NH 58 Terminal near Bheem.
NH 48 near Gulabpura.
NH 52 near Hindoli.
NH 552 Terminal near Uniara.

== See also ==
- List of national highways in India
- List of national highways in India by state
