= Ramseen =

- sub tehsil
- Ramseen (रामसीन)
- Nickname: Ramshyan as religious name
- Location in Rajasthan, India Ramseen (India)
- Coordinates: 25°01′00″N 72°32′0″E
- Country: India
- State: Rajasthan
- District: Jalore district
- Elevation: 203 m (666 ft)

Population (2001)
  - Total: 8,376

Languages
  - Official: Hindi
- Time zone: UTC+5:30 (IST)
- PIN: 307803
- ISO 3166 code: RJ-IN
- Vehicle registration: RJ-46
- Nearest city: Bhinmal
- Lok Sabha constituency: Sirohi - Jalore
- Vidhan Sabha constituency: Bhinmal

Ramseen is a village and a sub tehsil in Jalore District of Rajasthan, India. The ancient Aapeshwar Mahadev temple is situated on the banks of a river flowing from Vitam Dam towards Sikwara.

The village is situated on main road network of the district and is therefore a transport hub. The nearest villages are Sikwara (4 km), Moodatara (7 km), Mandoli Nagar (8 km), and Thur (11 km). The district headquarters, Jalore, is about 23 km to the north. This town is about 35 km north of Bhinmal, 17 km to the south of Bakra, 21 km to the north of Bagra and 21 km to the west of Siyana.

Marwar Bhinmal is the nearest railway station. The economy of district is based mainly on agriculture and animal husbandry. Oilseeds, especially mustard, is the predominant crop together with wheat, bajra, kharif pulses, barley, jowar and fleawort.

== History ==
Ramseen is an ancient village which exists as a town and sub-tehsil. According to myth, Lord Rama, while going towards Chitrakoot during his fourteen years of exile, rested for the night here, due to which the place was named as Ramchayan, a corruption of Ramasayana, Ramsen and then later Ramseen.

Ramseen has an ancient temple of Lord Shiva known as Apeshwar Mahadev situated on the east side of the river passing through the middle of the village.

The town is mainly divided into four parts. In the middle is the main market on the eastern bank of the river, east of the market and there is an area called Vijayanagar situated on Sirohi road, where the cattle herder Nomadic tribes Rabari (Dewasi) and Bhil dominates, while one area is on Bhinmal road and one on Jaswantpura.
