= Kuchor Aguni =

Village in Rajasthan, India

- Village
- Location within Rajasthan Location within India
- Coordinates: 27.8824°N 73.7047°E
- Country: India
- State: Rajasthan
- District: Bikaner
- Sub-District: Jasrasar

Government
  - Type: Panchayati Raj
  - Body: Gram Panchayat

Area
  - Total: 42.90 km^{2} (16.56 sq mi)

Population (2011)
  - Total: 5,494

Language
  - Official Language: Hindi
- Time zone: UTC+5:30 (IST)
- PIN: 334802
- Vehicle registration: RJ-50, RJ-07

Kuchor Aguni is a small village located in Jasrasar Tehsil of Bikaner District, Rajasthan, India.

People residing in this village rely on agriculture, consists both irrigated and non-irrigated farming.

== Demographics ==
According to the 2011 Census conducted by the Government of India, the population of this village was 5494, out of which 2855 were males and, 2639 were females. The literacy rate was 51.09%.

Inhabitants of this village follows Hinduism.

Religion in Kuchor Aguni village (2011)
Religion	Percent
Hinduism	100%
Distribution of religions in Kuchor Aguni Village

Bagri is the most spoken language here. Hindi, and English are officially used languages.

Languages of Kuchor Aguni village(2011)
1. Bagri (98.0%)
2. Hindi (1.00%)
3. English (1.00%)

The village's Pin Code (Postal Index Number Code) is 334202.

== Transportation ==
Road transport facilities in this village are good, although there are no railway transportation facilities.

== See also ==
- Jasrasar
- Kuchor Athuni
