= Kuchor Athuni =

Village in Rajasthan, India

- Village
- Location within Rajasthan Location within India
- Coordinates: 27.8514°N 73.6751°E
- Country: India
- State: Rajasthan
- District: Bikaner
- Sub-District: Jasrasar

Government
  - Type: Panchayati Raj
  - Body: Gram Panchayat

Area
  - Total: 43.61 km^{2} (16.84 sq mi)

Population (2011)
  - Total: 3,736

Language
  - Official Language: Hindi
- Time zone: UTC+5:30 (IST)
- PIN: 334802
- Vehicle registration: RJ-50, RJ-07

Kuchor Athuni is a small village in Jasrasar Tehsil of Bikaner District, Rajasthan, India.

People residing in this village rely on agriculture, consisting of irrigated and non-irrigated farming.

== Demographics ==
According to the 2011 Census conducted by the Government of India, the population of this village was 3,736, out of which 1,937 were males and 1,799 were females. The literacy rate was 63.33%.

Inhabitants of this village follows Hinduism.

Religion in Kuchor Athuni village (2011)
Religion	Percent
Hinduism	100%
Distribution of religions in Kuchor Athuni Village

Bagri is the most spoken language here. Hindi, and English are officially used languages.

Languages of Kuchor Athuni village(2011)
1. Bagri (97.0%)
2. Hindi (2.00%)
3. English (1.00%)

The village's Pin Code (Postal Index Number Code) is 334202.

== Transportation ==
Road transport facilities in this village are good, although there are no railway transportation facilities.

== See also ==
- Jasrasar
- Kuchor Aguni
