= Khanzada Khan =

Khanzada Khan may refer to:

== Khanzada Rajput ruler of Mewat ==
- Khanzada Bahadur Khan (reign 1402–1412)
- Khanzada Feroz Khan (reign 1417–1422)
- Khanzada Jalal Khan (reign 1422–1443)
- Khanzada Ahmad Khan (reign 1443–1468)
- Khanzada Zakaria Khan (reign 1468–1485)
- Khanzada Alawal Khan (reign 1485–1504)
- Nawab Qutb Khan Khanzada, defeated Hindu Kambhos to take over Sohna in 1570 and his clan was defeated and expelled in 1620 by the Sisodia Rajputs

== Other ==
- Khanzada Khan (Pakistani politician) (fl. 1993–2015)

== See also ==
- Khanzada Rajputs
- Khanzada (disambiguation)
