= Mewat (disambiguation) =

Mewat is a historical and cultural region which encompasses the modern day states of Haryana, Uttar Pradesh and Rajasthan in northwestern India.

Mewat may also refer to:

- Mewat district (officially renamed Nuh district), a district in the Indian state of Haryana.
- Mewati people, an ethnic group, also known as "Meo".
- Kingdom of Mewat, the sovereign kingdom ruled by the Khanzadas of Mewat.
- Mewati language

== See also ==
- Meo, an ethnic group originating from Mewat.
- Mewati, the Indic language spoken in the region.
- Mewati gharana, a type of Indian classical music originating from Mewat.
- Mewati cattle, a cattle breed.
