= Muslim Rajputs =

Muslim descendants of Rajputs

Regions with significant populations
- India and Pakistan

Languages
- Punjabi; Sindhi; Urdu; Mewati; Pahari-Pothwari

Religion
- Islam

Related ethnic groups
- Rajputs and other Indo-Aryan peoples

Muslim Rajputs are the descendants of Rajputs, a community from northern India and Pakistan, who are adherents of Islam. The community converted from Hinduism to Islam from the medieval period onwards, founding various dynasties and states while retaining original clan names, and are further divided into different clans.

== History ==
The term Rajput is traditionally applied to the clans who claimed Suryavanshi, Chandravanshi and Agnivanshi lineages of Kshatriyas in the Hindu varna system. They are sometimes also known as Ranghars.

=== Conversion to Islam and ethos ===
Upon their conversion from Hinduism to Islam, many Muslim Rajputs maintained some of their Hindu customs. Muslim Rajputs also often retained common social practices, such as purdah (seclusion of women), with Hindu Rajputs.

Despite the difference in religious faith, Muslim Rajputs have cooperated with Hindu Rajputs on several occasions against common threats. For example, the Khanzadas of Mewat fought with Rana Sanga against Babur.

In 1993, instances of conversions of Rajputs to Islam were recorded in Khurja tehsil of Bulandshahr, in western Uttar Pradesh.

=== Muslim Rajput clans ===
==== Khanzada of Mewat ====
Mewat was a kingdom in Rajputana with its capital at Alwar which was ruled by a Khanzada Rajput dynasty in the Delhi Sultanate. Hasan Khan Mewati fought along with Rana Sanga in the Battle of Khanwa against Babur, and died in the battle. Mewat covered a huge area in present-day Rajasthan, Haryana and Uttar Pradesh. The Meo Khanzadas claimed to have been descended from Hindu Yadu Rajputs.

==== Kindwar of Kharagpur ====
The Kharagpur Raj was a Muslim Kindwar Rajput chieftaincy in modern-day Munger district of Bihar. Raja Sangram Singh led a rebellion against the Mughal authorities and was subsequently defeated and executed. His son, Toral Mal, converted to Islam and took name Roz Afzun. Roz Afzun became a loyal commander of Jahangir and Shah Jahan, and Jahangir referred to him as his "favourite" commander in the empire. Another prominent chieftain of this dynasty was Tahawar Singh who played an active role in the Mughal expedition against the nearby Cheros of Palamu.

==== Lalkhani of Bulandshahr ====
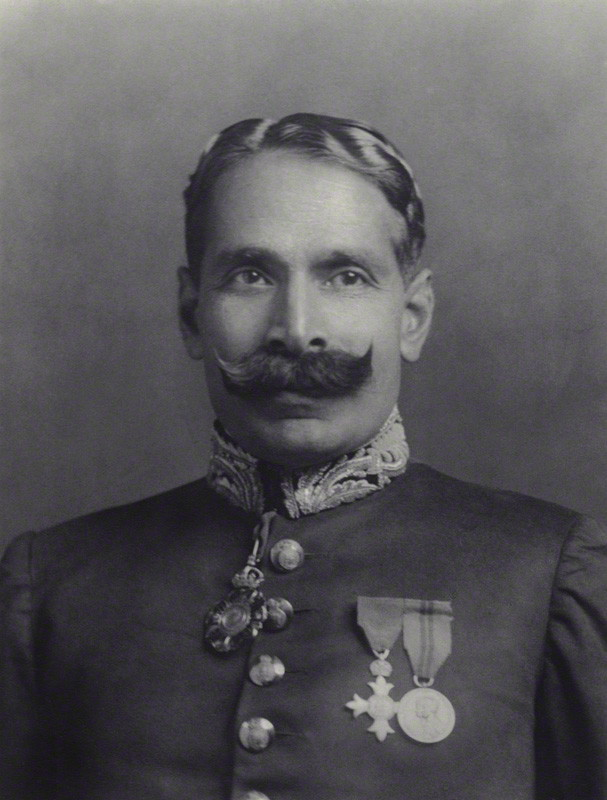
Ahmad Said Khan, the Nawab of Chhatri and a Lalkhani Rajput

The Lalkhanis are a Muslim Rajput community and a sub-clan of the Bargujars. They were the Nawabs of various estates in western Uttar Pradesh. These included Chhatari and neighbouring regions including parts of Aligarh and Bulandshahr.

==== Qaimkhani of Fatehpur-Jhunjhunu ====
The Qaimkhanis were a Muslim Rajput dynasty who were notable for ruling the Fatehpur–Jhunjhunu region in Rajasthan from the 1300s to the 1700s. They claimed to have descended from Hindu Chauhan Rajputs.

==== Mayi of Bihar ====
The Mayi clan were the chieftains of the Narhat–Samai (Hisua) chieftaincy in modern-day Nawada district in south Bihar. Descended from the Bhatti Rajputs of Talwandi, one of their notable figures was Daulat Khan Mayi, a Rajput subahdar of Kandahar. The founder of the Mayi clan was Nuraon Khan who arrived in Bihar in the 17th century. His descendants were Azmeri and Deyanut who were granted zamindari rights over six parganas by the Mughal authorities. Deyanut's son was Kamgar Khan who expanded his land by attacking and plundering neighbouring zamindars. Kamgar Khan also led numerous revolts against the Mughals and attempted to assert the Mayi's independence. His descendant was Iqbal Ali Khan who took part in the 1781 revolt in Bihar against the British however his revolt failed and Mayi's lost much of their land.

==== Bias and Ghosi of Bengal ====
Rajput communities began settling in Bengal during the Sultanate period where they were given high ranks in the Bengal government. One notable example is of Bhagirath of Ayodhya, who belonged to the Hindu Bais clan, who was appointed as the Dewan of Sultan Ghiyasuddin Mahmud Shah. His son, Kalidas Gajdani embraced Sunni Islam through the guidance of Ibrahim Danishmand and became known as Sulaiman Khan. Bhagirath's grandson, Isa Khan, grew to become the chief of Bengal's Baro-Bhuyan confederacy which posed as a threat to the Mughals who wanted to conquer Bengal. The diwans of Mymensingh and Dhaka during the 19th-century were said to be the descendants of Muslim Rajputs.

Another Bengali Rajput community are the Ghosi, who can predominantly be found in the 24 Parganas and Midnapore districts, particularly near the towns of Barrackpur and Kharagpur. They migrated to Bengal from Kanpur five centuries ago and are descended from Amar Singh Rathore, a Rajput nobleman from Jhansi who converted to Islam. They are divided into several clans; Rathore, Dogar, Chauhan, Khelari, Tatar, Lehar, Nahar and Maidul.

==== Gichki of Makran ====
The Makran state was ruled by Gichki Nawabs, who were of Rajput origin. Their ancestor, Jagat Singh, had migrated from Rajputana in the 17th century and converted to Islam, although the clan later Balochised.

== Demographics ==
=== British India ===
==== Punjab ====
In the Punjab Province of British India, comprising Punjab and some parts of Khyber Pakhtunkhwa in modern Pakistan as well Punjab, Haryana, Chandigarh, Delhi, and some parts of Himachal Pradesh in modern India, in 1921, 70.7% of the Punjabi Rajputs were Muslims while 27.7% were Hindus, with the highest percentage of Rajputs found in Rawalpindi, with 21%.

=== Pakistan ===
In 2008, it was estimated that the Rajput population in Pakistan stood at 15 million, with around 9 million in Punjab, nearly 5 million in Sindh, followed by 643,000 in Azad Kashmir, 223,000 in Islamabad, 174,000 in Khyber Pakhtunkhwa and 37,000 in Balochistan.

==== Punjab ====
In Pakistan's Punjab province, the Rajputs are dominant in the Pothohar Plateau through its politics and military.

As per the 2017 Pakistan census, Rajputs numbered around 5% of Lahore's population, their population amounting to some 550,000 individuals out of Lahore's total population of around 11 million.

=== India ===
==== Uttar Pradesh ====
In India's Uttar Pradesh, many Rajput communities have embraced Islam, such as the Bais or the Gautam, the Gautamanas or Gautam Thakurs as they like to call themselves being the largest such group in the Fatehpur district, where they number around 100,000.

== See also ==
- Rajputization
- List of Rajput dynasties and states
- Rajput clans
- List of Pakistani political families
