= Ibtada =

Educational organization in India

Ibtada (Urdu for 'the beginning') is a private non-profit development organization which focuses on organization and education of deprived women of the Alwar, India region. Ibtada is headquartered in Alwar, India, and the Mewat region of Rajasthan.

It was founded in 1997 by Rajesh Singhi.

Ibtada serves around 400 villages in 6 Blocks of Alwar, Rajasthan. This area is known to be dominated by Meo-Muslims, the traditional peasantry class. The region suffers extreme social and economic underdevelopment due to lack of resources, awareness, education, health and gender equality.

== History ==
Initially focused on the formation of self-help groups (SHGs). By March 1999, Ibtada had formed 16 SHGs, which grew to 142 by 2001 and to over 2000 at present. In addition to forming SHGs, Ibtada had established upper tier institutions, including 68 clusters and 4 federations. The organization has also implemented livelihood interventions in the areas of agriculture and animal husbandry, with goat rearing being a key intervention involving over 500 families. Ibtada has also focused on developing the skills of women, enabling them to work as Resource Persons for their communities. Through this process, Ibtada has developed women as Pashu Sakhies, Krishi Sakhies, Swasthya Sakhies, Shiksha Sakhies, and Adhikar Sakhies.

Ibtada's girls' education programme began in August 2000, with 7 learning centers (called Taleemshalas). This program has since grown to encompass 121 learning centers as of 2011. The Taleemshalas provide education to out-of-school girls up to Class V, after which they are mainstreamed into public schools. However, following the implementation of the Right to Education (RTE) in 2009, Ibtada began working with government schools to improve their quality and involve the community in their functioning. Currently, Ibtada's public school program covers 100 schools in the districts of Ramgarh and Kishangarh, and also includes an Upper Primary School in Gwalda.

== Initiatives ==
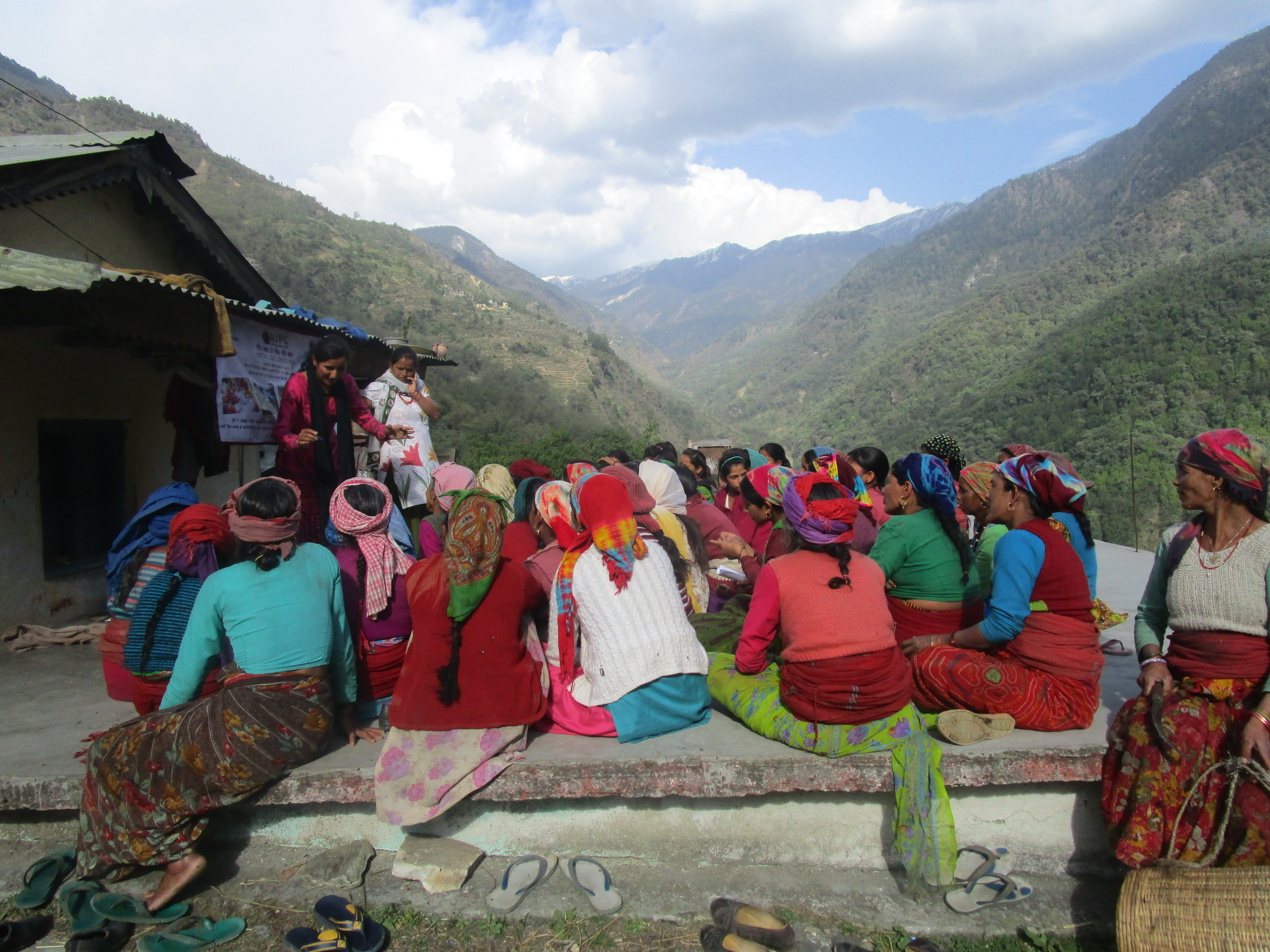
A discussion on best practices around menstrual hygiene

=== Savings credit based institutions ===
Promoting community-based institutions for women empowerment is the core of Ibtada's mission. These institutions empower women to: change power relations in their family and in society, foster decision-making processes among women, enhance their degree of control over resources and provide them space for visibility and collective action. Ibtada's three tier Institutional architecture (SHGs, Clusters and Federations or Manch) forms the base for implementing different programmes for Financial Inclusion, Livelihoods, Girls Empowerment and Rights & Entitlements. Ibtada has promoted 10 federations until now, including 5 for the NRLM. Currently, four federations - Chetna, Kranti, Sangharsh, and Savera, registered as Trusts work autonomously with ongoing support from Ibtada.

=== Women-led livelihoods ===
Entrepreneurship amongst women is promoted by providing them with market knowledge as well as financial help. Women who are members of the SHGs can secure loans to start small shops in their village, thus reducing their dependence on agriculture or on an animal husbandry-based income. Women are also provided market knowledge to source stock and Ibtada provides support for maintaining accounts. As part of this intervention, many women were able to open general stores, cosmetics, animal feed or tailoring shops etc. and are earning additional income.

=== Education ===
Education has been a primary focus of Ibtada's initiatives, with introduction of school libraries, Bal sansads as well as supplementary classes. They have also worked in order to improve infrastructure in public schools and have facilitated the setting up and operations of School Management committees.

=== Girl Empowerment ===
The lack of education for girls has been one of the important reasons of the poor state of women and girls in the Mewat region. The Girls Empowerment Program is focused upon providing formal and informal education to girls aged 12 to 18 years through Girls Resource Centers (established at village level), career guidance, vocational training, financial support & transport facilities.

=== Rights and entitlements ===
Village Rights Committees are created in clusters that disseminate information to the women about government schemes, programs, entitlements and roles & responsibilities of the service providers to empower and make them 'Adikaar Sakhis' who can help the village members receive their rights and entitlements.

== Campaigns ==
=== Covid Response ===
Since 2020, Ibtada has been carrying out a robust covid relief response in the villages of Alwar, Rajasthan. The aim of the response has been to provide instant relief to the community by bridging existing gaps and creating awareness.
