= Kotla, Nuh =

Kotla
- Town
- Location within Haryana Location within India
- Coordinates: 27.99894°N 76.94483°E
- Country: India
- State: Haryana
- District: Nuh
- Elevation: 200 m (660 ft)

Languages
  - Official: Hindi
  - Spoken: Urdu, Mewati
- Time zone: UTC+5:30 (IST)

Kotla, 7 km south of Nuh city in the scenic Aravalli Hills, is a historic village in Nuh district of Haryana, India.

== History ==
=== Khanzada rajputs period ===
Kotla was a stronghold of the Khanzadas of Mewat and seat of power of the Khanzada ruler Bahadur Nahar Khan. Its historical importance came from its strategic position: in a narrow valley with only one pass, and protected on the east by the large lake (Kotla lake or Dahar Lake or Ujina Lake), when the lake was filled with water, the only way in was through a narrow strip of land between the lake and the hills.

=== Mughal period ===
Kotla is listed in the Ain-i-Akbari as a pargana under the sarkar of Tijara, producing a revenue of 1,552,196 dams for the imperial treasury and supplying a force of 700 infantry and 30 cavalry. It appears with the note "Has a brick fort on a hill on which there is a reservoir 4 kos in circumference."

== Tourism ==
- Kotla Fort of Raja Nahar Khan
- Kotla Bavdi stepwell
- Kotla Waterfall: active during rainy season.
- Kotla Lake: an artificial dam was constructed in 1838, resulting in the formation of Sangel, also known as Ujina Lake or Dahar Lake. Kotla Lake is a man-made lake and is crucial for irrigation of surrounding agricultural land and is also home to various fish species.

== See also ==
- Tourism in Haryana
