= Khanzadas of Mewat =

Indian royal dynasty

Kingdom of Mewat
- 1372–1527
- Speculative reconstruction of the flag

- The Khanzadas of Mewat circa 1400, with neighbouring polities.
- Status: Tributary to the Delhi Sultanate (1372-1427); Independent Kingdom (1427-1527)
- Capital: Alwar
- Common languages: Mewati
- Religion: Islam
- Demonym: Mewati
- Government: Absolute Monarchy
- Wāli
  - 1372-1402: Raja Nahar Khan(first)
  - 1504-1527: Raja Hasan Khan Mewati (last)
- History
  - Raja Nahar Khan proclaimed Wāli of Mewat: 1372
  - Battle of Khanwa: 1527
Preceded by	Succeeded by
Delhi Sultanate	Mughal Empire
- Today part of: India; Rajasthan; Uttar Pradesh; Haryana

The Kingdom of Mewat was a sovereign kingdom ruled by the Khanzadas of Mewat. They were a ruling dynasty of Muslim Rajputs from Rajputana who had their capital at Alwar. The Khanzadas were Muslim Rajputs who descended from Raja Sonpar Pal who was a Rajput who converted to Islam during the period of the Delhi Sultanate in India.

== History ==
In 1372, Firuz Shah Tughlaq granted the Lordship of Mewat to Raja Nahar Khan, (who was formerly known as Raja Sonpar Pal, of Kotla). Raja Nahar Khan established a hereditary polity in Mewat and proclaimed the title of Wali-e-Mewat. Later his descendants affirmed their own sovereignty in Mewat. They ruled Mewat till 1527.

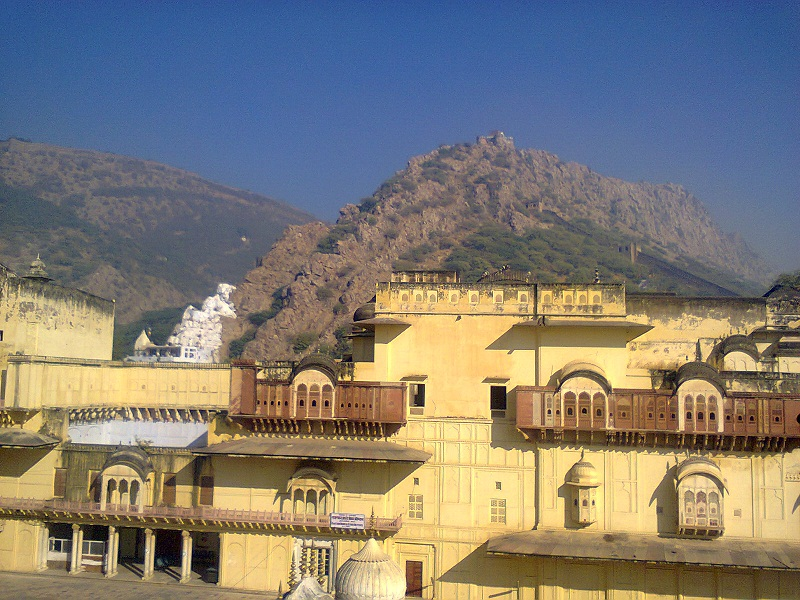
Distant view of Alwar fort from the city

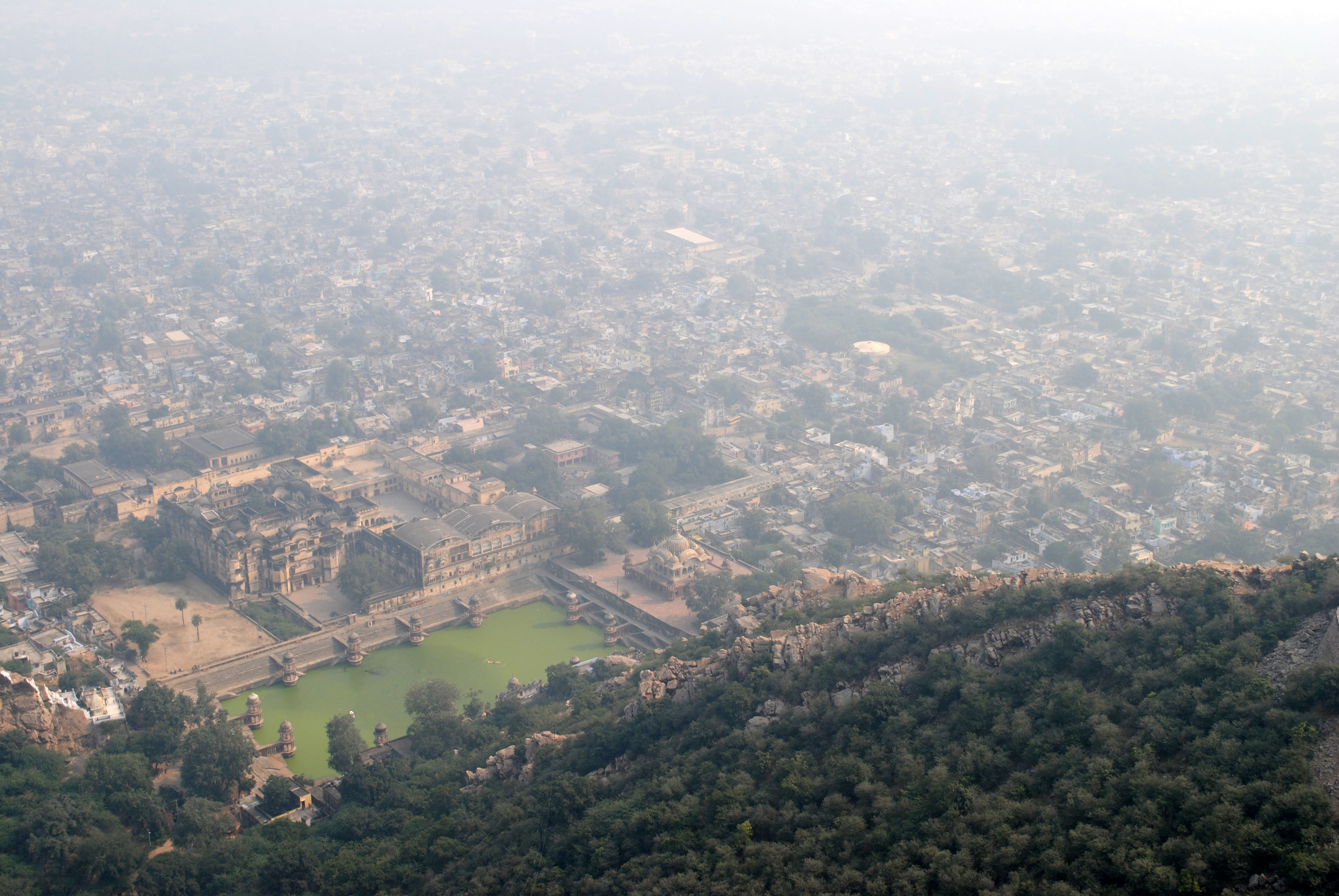
View of city of Alwar from Bala Quila.

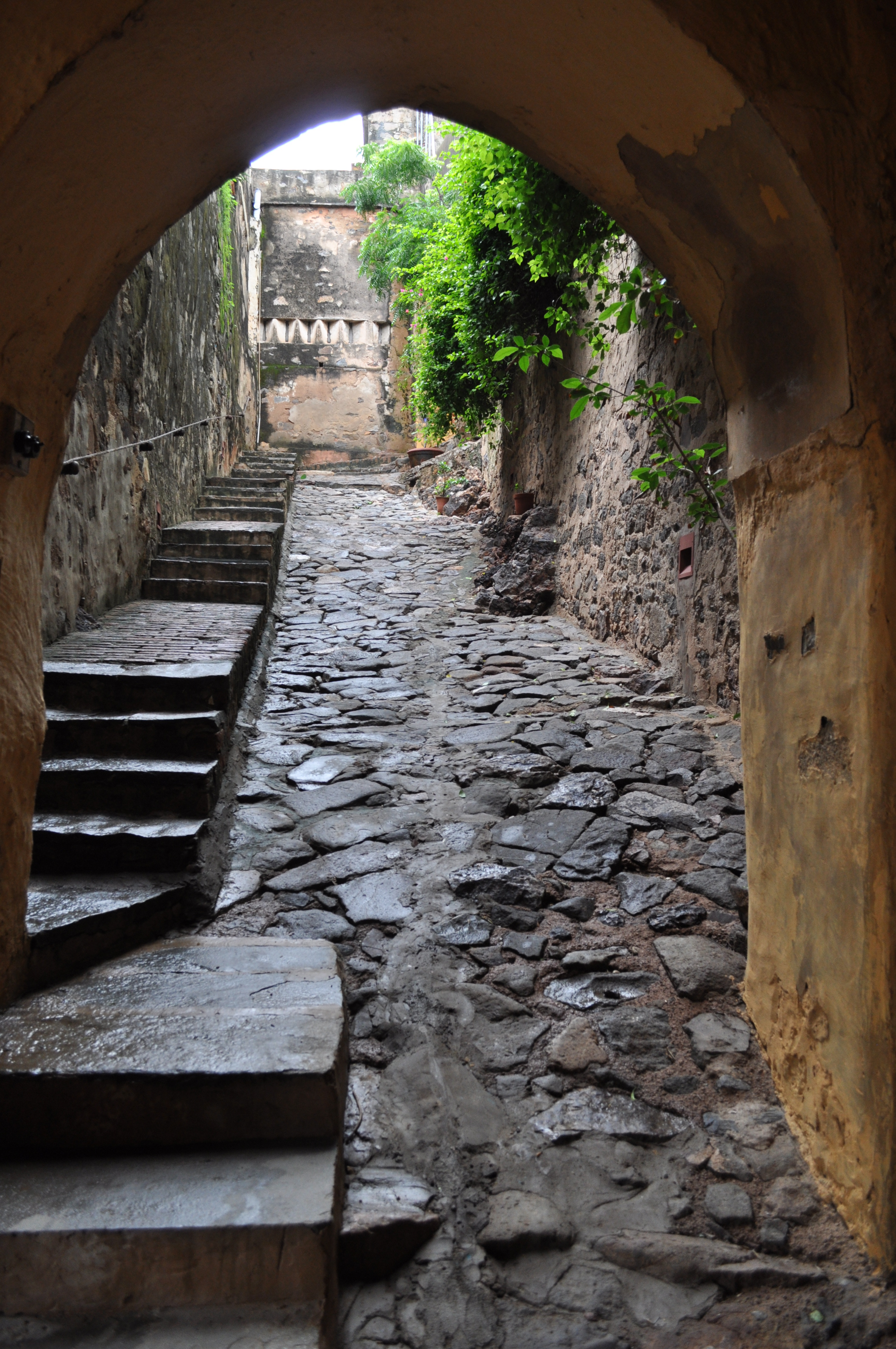
A passage at the Hill Fort, Kesroli.

== Downfall ==
The last Khanzada Rajput ruler of Mewat was Hasan Khan Mewati, who died in the Battle of Khanwa. Following this battle, Mewat was integrated into the Mughal Empire and the Khanzadas became a part of the Mughal nobility.

== Rulers of Mewat ==
The Khanzada Rajputs rulers of Mewat State adopted the title "Wali-e-Mewat". The title was later changed to "Shah-e-Mewat" by Hasan Khan Mewati in 1505.

Lineage
	Rulers of Mewat State	Reign
1st	Raja Nahar Khan, f.k.a Raja Sonpar Pal - the founder of Mewat state and the progenitor of Khanzada Rajputs	1372–1402
2nd	Raja Khanzada Bahadur Khan - founded Bahadurpur in 1406.	1402–1412
3rd	Raja Khanzada Akleem Khan	1412–1417
4th	Raja Khanzada Feroz Khan - founded Ferozepur Jhirka in 1419.	1417–1422
5th	Raja Khanzada Jalal Khan	1422–1443
6th	Raja Khanzada Ahmad Khan	1443–1468
7th	Raja Khanzada Zakaria Khan	1468–1485
8th	Raja Khanzada Alawal Khan - won Bala Quila from Nikumbh Rajputs to stop the practice of human sacrifice.	1485–1504
9th	Raja Khanzada Hasan Khan Mewati - The last Khanzada Rajput ruler of Mewat.	1504–1527

== Descendants ==
In the following centuries, the Khanzadas were reduced to the status of zamindars. Many continued to serve in the Alwar State Forces and British Indian Army. The Gorwal gotra of the Meos seem to be a tributary to the Khanzada Rajputs, however this is unclear. However, the Chowdhurys' of Tijara and Nawabs of Shahabad, Alwar remained important Khanzadas strongholds.

Among them Nawab Feroz Khan of Shahabad, Alwar and Khan Bahadur Fateh Naseeb Khan of Tijara, Alwar achieved Imperial chivalry ranks.

After the Partition of India, majority Khanzadas of Mewat migrated to Pakistan following the religious violence in India in 1947, and settled in these Districts: Karachi, Hederabad, Nawabshah, Larakana, Kasur, Faisalabad and Narowal.
