= Khanzada (disambiguation) =

The Khanzada Rajputs are a Muslim Rajput community found in the northern part of the Indian subcontinent, particularly in Rajasthan, Haryana and Sindh.

Khanzada may also refer to:

- Khanzadas of Mewat, a ruling dynasty in Rajputana, India
- Khanzada Khan (Pakistani politician), Pakistani politician for the Pakistan Peoples Party
- Khanzada Begum (1478–1545), Timurid princess and sister of the Mughal emperor Babur
- Sevin Beg Khanzada (1360–1411), Khwarezmian princess

== See also ==
- Khanzada Khan (disambiguation), a list of rulers Khanzada Rajput rulers of Mewat
