= Khanzada Bahadur Khan =

Raja Khanzada Bahadur Khan
- Raja

Wāli-e-Mewat
- Reign: 1402-1412
- Coronation: 1402
- Predecessor: Raja Nahar Khan
- Successor: Raja Akleem Khan
- Issue: Raja Akleem Khan, Khanzada Feroz Khan, Khalil Khan, Malik Fakharuddin Khan, Lashkar Khan, Sarang Khan, Mallu Iqbal Khan, Kaltash Khan, Sultaan Khan, Hateem Khan and Emad Khan
- House: Khanzada Rajput
- Father: Raja Nahar Khan

Wali-e-Mewat Raja Khanzada Bahadur Khan was the Khanzada Rajput ruler of Mewat. He succeeded as Wali-e-Mewat after the death of his father Raja Nahar Khan Mewati in 1402.

== Coronation ==
His coronation took place at Alwar in 1402, where his brothers proclaimed him as Wali-e-Mewat and swore their allegiance with him as their liege lord. He then made Alwar his capital. In honour of his ascension to the throne, he had a mosque built at Alwar known as Jamia-i-Alwar Masjid.

== Later life ==
He founded Bahadurpur in 1406. In 1412 he handed-over the throne of Mewat to his son Raja Akleem Khan and devoted himself to religious work until his death.

Preceded by Raja Nahar Khan	Wali-e-Mewat; 1402 – 1412	Succeeded by Khanzada Akleem Khan
