= Banainy Dhounkla =

Village in Bharatpur, Rajasthan, India

Banainy Dhounkla is a village in the Bharatpur district of Rajasthan, near the nagar tehsil of Rajasthan.
