= Dikhit Khanzada =

Group of the Khanzada community in India

The Dikhit Rajputs are a sub-group within the Khanzada community in north India.
