= Fateh Naseeb Khan =

Military official of Alwar State, British India

Fateh Naseeb Khan OBE
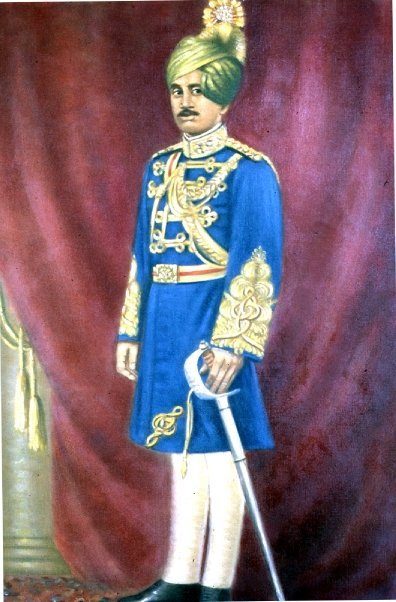
- Born: Alwar State, British India
- Military career
- Allegiance: Alwar State
- Branch: Alwar State Forces; Imperial Service Troops
- Service years: 1904–1933
- Rank: Major General
- Commands: Commander-in-chief of Alwar State Forces; Officer-in-Charge of Sariska Hunting Reserve; Army Minister of Alwar (Member Alwar State Council)
- Conflicts: World War I Third Anglo-Afghan War
- Awards: Order of the British Empire; Khan Bahadur (title); Tazimi

Khan Bahadur Maj.Gen. Fateh Naseeb Khan, OBE KB (1888–1933), was the Commander-in-chief of Alwar State Forces. He was a close confidant and trusted aide of Maharaja Jai Singh Prabhakar Bahadur, who was the Maharaja of Alwar State. He participated in World War I.

== Background and family ==
He belonged to a Khanzada Muslim Rajput family. He was a descendant of Raja Nahar Khan, who was a Rajput ruler of Mewat.

He had six sons namely, Sub Maj (R) Abdul Majeed Khan (IST), SP (R) Abdul Waheed Khan (FIA), Maj (R) Muhammad Iqbal Khan (PR), Dr Muhammad Allahdad Khan (PARC), Lt Colonel Malik Niaz Ahmad Khan (PA) and Prof Dr Khursheed Alam Khan (KU). After the Partition of India, they emigrated to Pakistan following the religious violence in India in 1947, and settled in Hyderabad, Pakistan.

== State Service ==
- Naib risaldar, Alwar State Forces, 1904
- Risaldar, Alwar State Forces, 1907
- Risaldar Major, Alwar State Forces, 1910
- Additional Aide-de-camp to Maharaja of Alwar State, 1913
- Aide-de-camp to Maharaja of Alwar State, 1914
- Deputed to Imperial Service Troops during World War I,
- Officer in Charge, Alwar Elephantry military unit, Alwar State Forces, 1916
- Squadron Commander, Alwar State Forces, 1920
- Commanding officer, Mangal Lancers (Now Part of 61st Cavalry Regiment), Alwar State Forces, 1922
- Commander-in-chief, Alwar State Forces, 1930

Military offices
Preceded by Daud Khan	Commander-in-Chief of Alwar State Forces; 1930 – 1933	Succeeded by Abdul Rahman Khan Chib, Bahadur
