= Akleem Khan =

Raja Khanzada Akleem Khan Bahadur
- Raja

Wāli-e-Mewat
- Reign: 1412–1417
- Predecessor: Khanzada Bahadur Khan
- Successor: Khanzada Feroz Khan
- Issue: Akleem Cross
- House: Khanzada Rajput
- Father: Khanzada Bahadur Khan

Wali-e-Mewat Raja Khanzada Akleem Khan, Bahadur, son of Khanzada Bahadur Khan Mewati, was the Khanzada Rajput ruler of Mewat from 1412 until 1417. He was succeeded by his brother Khanzada Feroz Khan as Wali-e-Mewat in 1417.

Preceded by Khanzada Bahadur Khan	Wali-e-Mewat; 1412 – 1417	Succeeded by Khanzada Feroz Khan
