= Maman Singh Yadav =

Indian politician

Member of the Rajasthan Legislative Assembly
- In office 2013–2018
- Constituency: Tijara

Personal details
- Party: Bharatiya Janata Party
- Occupation: Politician

Maman Singh Yadav is an Indian politician from the Bharatiya Janata Party and a member of the Rajasthan Legislative Assembly representing the Tijara Vidhan Sabha constituency of Rajasthan.
