= Malik Alaudin Khan =

Malik Alaudin Khan was the son of Raja Nahar Khan and the jagirdar of Tijara. He was a Khanzada Rajput. In 1402, his father Nahar Khan was killed in an ambush for embracing Islam by his Hindu relative Raja Thakur Jhamo Singh of Kishangarh. Alaudin Khan avenged his father by killing his maternal relative Jhamo Singh in the same year. Malik Alaudin Khan ruled Tijara and Alwar on behalf of the Mewat State. He renewed the construction of the Alwar fort.
