= Khanzada Jalal Khan =

Raja Khanzada Jalal Khan
- Raja
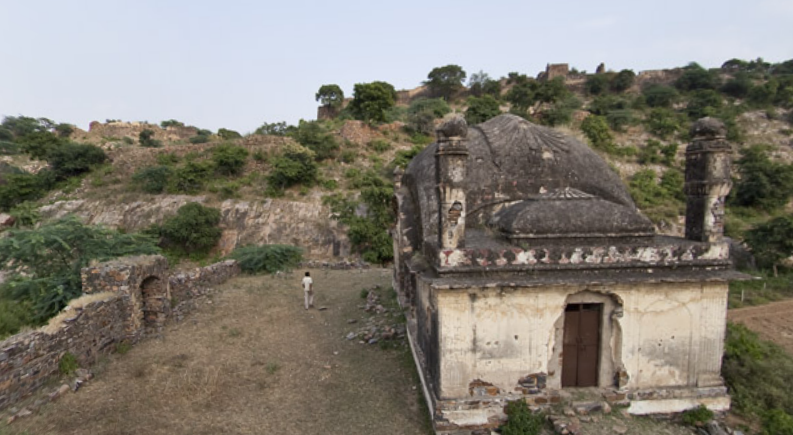
- Tomb of Raja Khanzada Jalal Khan

Wāli-e-Mewat
- Reign: 1422-1443
- Predecessor: Raja Khanzada Feroz Khan
- Successor: Raja Khanzada Ahmad Khan
- Issue: Raja Khanzada Ahmad Khan
Regnal name
- Fateh-Ud-Duniya-Wa-Ud Din Wali-e-Mewat Raja Khanzada Jalal Khan Bahadur
- House: Khanzada Rajput
- Father: Khanzada Feroz Khan

Raja Khanzada Jalal Khan Bahadur a.k.a. Jallu Khan, son of Khanzada Feroz Khan, was the Khanzada Rajput ruler of Mewat State from 1422 to 1443. He succeeded his father as Wali-e-Mewat in 1422. He ruled as a sovereign ruler from 1427 after defeating the Delhi sultanate.

== Early Life and ascension ==
He was born as the eldest son of Khanzada Feroz Khan the Wāli of Mewat. he succeeded his father as Wāli of Mewat in 1422 after his death.

== Reign ==
=== Conflict with Delhi ===
In 1427, Sultan Mubarak Shah of Delhi's Sayyid dynasty attacked Mewat. The Mewati army fortified themselves for one year in the hills of Tijara, after which the Delhi army retreated. This event marked the complete sovereignty of Khanzada Rajputs on Mewat.

=== Invasion of Amber ===
Jallu is claimed to have captured Amber, the stronghold of the Kachwaha rajas, and removed one of its gates to Indor. The fort at Indor, which lay about 6km to the north of Kotila and south of Delhi, was a Khanzada stronghold much favoured by Jallu.

== Death ==
He died around 1441, and Alexander Cunningham, the British historian notes that:

He is the great hero of the Khanzadas, who are never tired of relating his gallant deeds.

A brother of Jallu, Ahmad, succeeded him and lived in relative peace until perhaps 1466.

Preceded by Khanzada Feroz Khan	Wali-e-Mewat; 1422 – 1443	Succeeded by Khanzada Ahmad Khan
