= Jurehra, Rajasthan =

Jurhera Jurhera
- Town
- Country: India
- State: Rajasthan
- District: Bharatpur

Government
  - Type: Gram Panchayat

Area
  - Total: 5 km^{2} (1.9 sq mi)

Population (2011)
  - Total: 10,987
  - Density: 2,200/km^{2} (5,700/sq mi)

Hindu 50%, Muslims 40%, Shikhism 5% and 5% others
  - Official: Hindi and Mewati
- Time zone: UTC+5:30 (IST)
- PIN: 321023
- ISO 3166 code: RJ-IN
- Vehicle registration: RJ-05

Jurehra is a Town in Bharatpur district of Rajasthan in India.

== Geography ==
Jurehra town is situated between the border of Rajasthan and Haryana. It is last village of Bharatpur District as well as of Rajasthan. Its area is up to 5 km and the roads are well connected to the various cities.
