= Khanzada Alawal Khan =

Raja Khanzada Alawal Khan
- Raja; Khan Bahadur

Wāli of Mewat
- Reign: 1485-1504
- Predecessor: Khanzada Zakaria Khan
- Successor: Khanzada Hasan Khan Mewati
- Died
- Military career
- Conflicts: Conquest of Bala Quila
- House: Khanzada Rajput
- Father: Khanzada Zakaria Khan

Wali-e-Mewat Raja Khanzada Alawal Khan, Bahadur, son of Khanzada Zakaria Khan Mewati, was the Khanzada Rajput ruler of Mewat from 1485 till 1504. He was succeeded by his son Hasan Khan Mewati as Wali-e-Mewat in 1504. In 1492 he captured Bala Quila from Nikumbh Rajputs. It is also believed that the city of Alwar is named after him.

Preceded by Khanzada Zakaria Khan	Wali-e-Mewat; 1485 – 1504	Succeeded by Khanzada Hasan Khan Mewati
