= Khanzada Feroz Khan =

Raja Khanzada Feroz Khan,
- Raja

Wāli of Mewat
- Reign: 1417-1422
- Predecessor: Raja Akleem Khan
- Successor: Raja Khanzada Jalal Khan
- Issue: Raja Khanzada Jalal Khan, Khudadad Khan, Malik Fakharuddin Khan, Abdul Qadeer Khan, Ali Khan and Fateh Khan
- House: Khanzada Rajput
- Father: Khanzada Bahadur Khan

Wali-e-Mewat Raja Khanzada Feroz Khan, Bahadur, son of Khanzada Bahadur Khan, was the Khanzada Rajput ruler of Mewat State from 1417 till 1422. He succeeded his brother Akleem Khan as Wali-e-Mewat in 1417. Feroz Khan, proved to be an effective and popular ruler due to introduction of administrative reforms. He founded Ferozepur Jhirka in 1419.

== Conflict with Delhi ==
In 1420 Sultan Khizr Khan of Delhi Sayyid dynasty attacked on Mewat. The Mewati army fortified themselves for one year in Bahadur Nahar Kotla, after which the Delhi army retreated.

== Death ==
He died in 1422, after which he was succeeded by his son Khanzada Jalal Khan

Preceded by Khanzada Akleem Khan	Wali-e-Mewat; 1417 – 1422	Succeeded by Khanzada Jalal Khan
