= Khanzada Ahmad Khan =

Raja Ahmad Khan, Bahadur,
- Wali-e-Mewat
- Reign: 1443-1468
- Predecessor: Khanzada Jalal Khan
- Successor: Khanzada Zakaria Khan
- House: Khanzada Rajput
- Father: Khanzada Jalal Khan

Wali-e-Mewat Raja Khanzada Ahmad Khan Mewati, Bahadur, son of Khanzada Jalal Khan Mewati, was the Khanzada Rajput ruler of Mewat from 1443 till 1468. He was succeeded by his son Khanzada Zakaria Khan Mewati as Wali-e-Mewat in 1468.

| Preceded by Khanzada Jalal Khan | Wali-e-Mewat; 1443 – 1468 | Succeeded by Khanzada Zakaria Khan |
