= Tufail Ahmad Khan =

Sardar Tufail Ahmad Khan (born 2 January 1943) is a Pakistani politician affiliated with the Pakistan Muslim League (Q). He was previously affiliated with Pakistan Muslim League (N). He is an ethnic, Khanzada Rajput.

== Biography ==
An agriculturist by profession, he completed a B.A. degree in 1965 from University of the Punjab and has been an MPA and Parliamentary Secretary from 1985 to 1988, MPA and Special Assistant to the Chief Minister from 1988 to 1990, MPA from 1990 to 1993, and MPA and Chairman of the Standing Committee on Finance, Punjab Assembly, from 1997 to 1999.

He was the MNA and Chairman standing committee Pakistan Railway from 2002 to 2007.

Married and father of three sons and five daughters, Sardar Tufail Ahmad Khan has travelled to Saudi Arabia. His hobbies include reading, fishing, and agricultural development.
