= Hasan Khan Mewati =

Ruler of Mewat from 1504 to 1527

Raja Hasan Khan Mewati
- Wāli; Raja
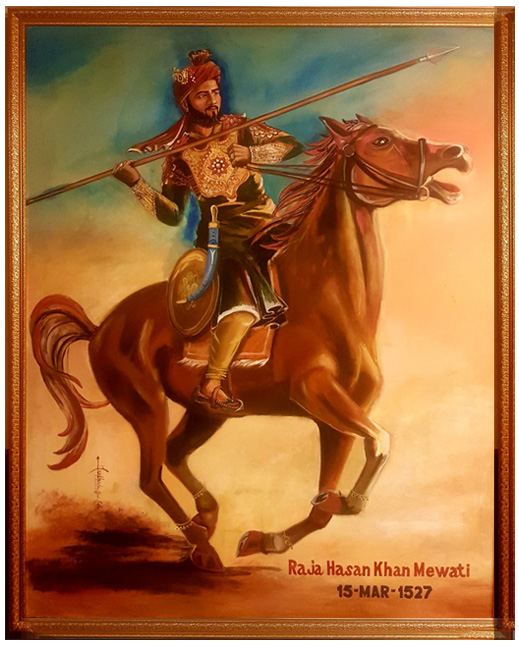

9th Shah-e-Mewat
- Reign: 1504 – 16 March 1527
- Predecessor: Khanzada Alawal Khan
- Successor: Post Abolished; Babur (as Mughal Emperor)
- Born: Alwar, Mewat (present-day Rajasthan, India)
- Died: 16 March 1527; Khanwa (present-day Rajasthan, India)
- Burial: Rajasthan, India
Names
- Hasan Khan Mewati
Posthumous name
- Wali-e-Mewat (lit. 'The King of Mewat')
- Hindi: हसन खां मेवाती
- Urdu: حسن خاں میواتی
- House: Khanzada Rajputs
- Dynasty: Wali-e-Mewat dynasty
- Father: Khanzada Alawal Khan
- Religion: Sunni Islam

Raja Hasan Khan Mewati (died 16 March 1527) was a Muslim Khanzada Rajput ruler of Mewat. The son of previous ruler Raja Alawal Khan, his dynasty had ruled Mewat State for nearly 200 years. He was a descendant of Raja Nahar Khan Mewati, who was the Wali of Mewat in the 14th century.

He was the Rajput chieftain whose ancestors had been ruling the region of Mewat for almost two centuries and had declared himself as a sovereign king. Babur, the founder of the Mughal Empire had stated that Hasan Khan Mewati was the leader of the ‘Mewat country’. He joined the Rajput Confederation with 5,000 allies in the Battle of Khanwa, where he was killed in the battle by Mughal forces led by Babur. He also re-constructed the Alwar fort in 15th century.

== Military campaigns ==
Hasan Khan Mewati played a significant role in two crucial battles: the Battle of Panipat and the Battle of Khanwa.

=== First battle of Panipat ===
Hasan Khan Mewati supported Ibrahim Lodi, the Sultan of Delhi, in the First Battle of Panipat, which took place in 1526. This battle was a pivotal conflict between the Mughal Empire, led by Babur, and the Sultanate of Delhi, led by Ibrahim Lodi. In this battle, Babur emerged victorious, and Lodi lost his life. During the conflict, Babur took Hasan Khan Mewati's son as a hostage. Following the Battle of Panipat, Hasan Khan Mewati aligned himself with Rana Sanga to continue the fight against Babur and the Mughal Empire.

=== Battle of Khanwa ===
The Battle of Khanwa occurred on March 15, 1527, between Rana Sanga of Mewar and Babur. At this time, Hasan Khan Mewati's patriotism and bravery had earned him a reputation as a fierce warrior. Hasan Khan Mewati, once again, supported Rana Sanga in this battle. When Rana Sanga was struck by an arrow and fell from his elephant, the Mewati king took charge of the commander's flag and led the attack against Babur's forces. Hasan Khan Mewati displayed tremendous valor as he, along with his 12 thousand horse soldiers, fiercely confronted Babur's army. They were initially successful and seemed to be overpowering the Mughal forces. During the battle, Mewati was struck by a cannonball that hit his chest. This injury proved fatal, and Mewati lost his life in the midst of the battle.

== Bibliography ==
- Sharma, Gopinath (1954). Mewar & the Mughal Emperors (1526-1707 A.D.). S.L. Agarwala.
