= Nahar Khan =

Ruler of Mewat

Raja Bahadur Nahar Khan
- Raja

Wāli-e-Mewat
- Reign: 1372-1402
- Predecessor: Post Established
- Successor: Khanzada Bahadur Khan
- Issue: Khanzada Bahadur Khan; Malik Alaudin Khan; Mubarak Khan; Shah Mehmood Khan; Pir Shahab Khan; Malik Haroon Khan; Siraj Khan; Fateh Khan; Noor Khan; Nizam Khan
- House: Khanzada
- Father: Raja Lakhan Pal

Raja Bahadur Nahar Khan was the ruler of Mewat and the progenitor of Khanzada clan who were themselves a sub-clan of Jadon Rajput. His original name was Sambhar Pal. He and his brother Sopar Pal (who later became Chhaju Khan) embraced Islam during the era of Firuz Shah Tughlaq. He was also known as Wali-e-Mewat Raja Bahadur Nahar Khan

== Background ==
He was the son of Jadaun Rajput Raja Lakhan Pal of Kotla Fort and great-grandson of Raja Adhan Pal (who was 4th in descent from Raja Tahan Pal). Tahan Pal, who founded Timangarh, was the eldest son of Maharaja Bijai Pal (founder of Bijai Garh and Maharaja of Karauli), who was 88th in descent from Krishna.

== Conversion to Islam ==
Tughlaq dynasty ruled during 14th century and at one point of time, the local leaders were asserting their independence to a greater extent. Sambhar Pal had risen to prominence during the period. Coercive and co-optative tactics were used by Firuz Shah Tughlaq to tackle such uprisings. Unable to achieve his objectives through forceful tactics, the Tughlaq Sultan then sought a peaceful resolution with Sambhar Pal, who, in a gesture of goodwill, embraced Islam, assuming the name Nahar Khan in 1359. His lineage continued to be known as Khanazadas.

Kunwar Sambhar Pal and his brother Kunwar Sopar Pal, the sons of Raja Lakhan Pal, were in service of Sultan Firuz Shah Tughlaq of Delhi Sultanate. They were accompanying the Sultan in one of his hunting expedition, where the Sultan was attacked by a tiger. Kunwar Sambhar Pal saved the Sultan by killing the tiger single-handedly. Sultan Firuz gave them the title of Bahadur Khan for his bravery.

== Founder of Khanzada community ==
Nahar Khan had nine sons, his descendants are known as Khanzada who were originally Hindu Jadaun Rajput.

== Wali of Mewat ==
Raja Nahar Khan of Kotla was a high ranking noble in the royal court of Delhi Sultanate. In 1372, Firuz Shah Tughlaq granted him the Lordship of Mewat. He established a hereditary polity in Mewat and proclaimed the title of Wali-e-Mewat. After his ascension to the throne in 1372, the people of Mewat began to gradually convert to Islam. Later his descendants affirmed their own sovereignty in Mewat. They ruled Mewat till 1527. The last Khanzada ruler of Mewat was Hasan Khan Mewati, who died in the Battle of Khanwa against the invading Mughal forces of Babur.

== Delhi Power Struggle ==
In 1388, Raja Nahar Khan aided Abu Bakr Shah, grandson of the late Emperor Firuz Shah Tughlaq, in expelling from Delhi Abu Bakr's uncle Nasir-ud-Din Mahmud Shah Tughluq and in establishing the former on the throne. In a few months, however, Abu Bakr had to give away before Nasiruddin, and he then fled to Raja Nahar's stronghold in Mewat State, where he was pursued by Nasiruddin. After a struggle Abu Bakr and Raja Nahar surrendered, and Abu Bakr was placed in confinement for life in the fort of Meerut, but Raja Nahar received a robe and was allowed to depart.

== Timur's Invasion of India ==
In 1398 during Timur's Invasion of Delhi, Nahar Khan withdrew to his Kotla Tijara and watched the development of events from there. Mewat State during this time was flooded with fugitives fleeing from Delhi and Khizr Khan, (the future Sultan of Delhi), was one of those who took shelter in Mewat. After defeating Nasiruddin, Timur sent two envoys to Mewat State who invited the Wali of Mewat for a meeting with him. Nahar accepted this invitation and both met in 1398. As a gesture of goodwill and symbol of friendship Raja Nahar Khan gifted Timur two white parrots, which Timur praised highly. Timur himself, made prominent mention of the conduct of Nahar Khan during the Invasion of India in 1398 AD. Timur states that he sent an embassy to Nahar Khan at Kotila, to which a humble reply was received. Raja Nahar sent as a present two white parrots that belonged to the late Emperor. Timur remarks that these parrots were much prized by him.

== Death ==
In 1402, Nahar Khan was killed in an ambush by his in-laws of Kishangarh Bas. After his death, his son Raja Bahadur Khan succeeded him as Wali-e-Mewat.

== Legacy ==
He had nine sons, namely Wali-e-Mewat Raja Bahadur Khan, Malik Alaudin Khan, Shah Mehmood Khan, Pir Shahab Khan, Malik Haroon Khan, Siraj Khan, Fateh Khan, Noor Khan and Nizam Khan. His son Mubarak was killed on December 1400 by Mallu Iqbal Khan.

Bahadur was the progenitor of Khanzada Rajput community. Hasan Khan Mewati, Abdul Rahim Khan-i-Khanan, Nawab Feroz Khan, Khan Bahadur Fateh Naseeb Khan, Abdul Kadir Khanzada, Tufail Ahmad Khan, Suhaib Ilyasi, Abdul Aleem Khanzada and Shahzeb Khanzada are his direct descendants.

Haveli Naharwali, in Kucha Sadullah Khan of Chandani Chowk in Old Delhi, is said to be originally owned by him, which later came in the ownership of family of former president of Pakistan, Pervez Musharraf, where he was born and his grandfather sold it to Prem Chand Gola after whom this area is now called Gola Market.

Preceded by Post established	Wali-e-Mewat; 1372 – 1402	Succeeded by Khanzada Bahadur Khan
