= Advocate Nasiruddin =

Indian lawyer, political and social leader

- Born: 1892; Tijara
- Died: 1949 (aged 56–57); Bhopal
- Known for: lawyer, Chess
- Parents: Saaduddin (father); Mustaqimun Nisan (mother)

Advocate Nasiruddin (1892–1949) was a lawyer, political and social leader from Bhopal state. He was popularly known as 'Vakil Nasiruddin' as "Vakil' in Urdu stands for 'Advocate'.

== Biography ==
His father, Saaduddin, died when he was a toddler. In 1901, when he was 8–9 years old, his mother, Mustaqimun Nisan, took him from Tijara to Bhopal state, where more opportunities for education and job were there. He chose his career as a lawyer and cleared the law examination in 1920. On 1 May 1922 when the High Court of the Bhopal State was started, he took 'First-grade Lawyer' degree from the newly created Bhopal High Court. Because of inborn talent and rational approach in legal decision, he attained not only a very good reputation but also proved himself a competent lawyer in very early age. His name was amongst the uppermost experts of law in the whole Central India Agency. In the State of Bhopal, his advice was sought in almost every legal case. Later of his life during the Undivided India, he was a leading practitioner of law and was amongst the topmost advocates.

== Few legal cases ==
He was one of the eminent lawyers during his professional career and conducted some very important cases. In one of the famous legal case between the brother and wife of Muhammad Ismail Ali Khan Tonk, he was at the side of Begum Anwar Jahan (daughter of General Abdul Qayyum Khan and wife of Muhammad Ismail Ali Khan Tonk). With him Barrister Abdul Majeed Khwaja while, in the opponent group at the side of the brother of Ismail Ali Khan Tonk, Advocate Muhammad Ali Jinnah was there. It was also the first visit of Muhammad Ali Jinnah to Bhopal as advocate.

In the second famous case, when the Government of Bhopal state appealed against the decision of creating the 'Obaidullah Khan Scholarship' by his family members Nawabzadah Rashiduzzafar Khan and Saeeduz Zafar Khan. Advocate Nasiruddin, Muhammad Ali Jinnah, Chaudhry Khaliquzzaman and Barrister Wasim (from Lucknow) took part in the deliberation from the side of the Government of Bhopal while on the other side, Sir Vazir Hasan, Chowdhry Nematullah (Lucknow) and Tej Bahadur Sapru participated.

== Politics ==
Advocate Nasiruddin is a famous example of a lawyer-turned-politician in Bhopal state. He was elected as member of the Municipal committee and remained its member consecutively for 12 years. He was also elected as Vice-chairman of Baldia Municipality (Municipal administration). He won the election of Legislative Council in 1934 (MLC). He was the member of Constitution Committee, which was formed by Nawab Hamidullah Khan for framing the constitution of Bhopal state. He was member of the managing committee of the 'Juditional Club' and remained as president of the Bar Association of Bhopal for several years.

== Titles and honour ==
He was awarded the title "Najmul Insha" by the Bhopal state. His active participation and services that he rendered for Civil defense and National Guard during the World War II was greatly acknowledged officially by the Bhopal state Government.

== Literary and sports activities ==
Advocate Nasiruddin used to take keen interest in literary activities. He was a voracious reader. He along with Advocate Abdur Raqib Alvi also started a weekly newspaper "Rahbar" in 1946 from Bhopal. Sayyad Abdul Raqib Alvi was the General Secretary of Bhopal Muslim League. He made an appeal on 21 June 1947 to make donation to the Pakistan fund because Qaide Azam had appealed for Pakistan fund

Advocate Nasiruddin also took interest in sports. His favourite game was chess in which he gained both name and fame in the Bhopal state.

== Death and legacy ==
He died at the age of 57 on 14 February 1949 and left no issues. Bar Association of Bhopal of which he was the president for several years, in its condolence note entitled him as 'Bhopal ka Sapru' (after the name of Tej Bahadur Sapru).

== See also ==
- Qazi Syed Rafi Mohammad
- Ghulam Mansoor
