= Khanzada Zakaria Khan =

Raja Khanzada Zakaria Khan, Bahadur,
- Wali-e-Mewat
- Reign: 1468-1485
- Predecessor: Khanzada Ahmad Khan
- Successor: Khanzada Alawal Khan
- House: Khanzada Rajput
- Father: Khanzada Ahmad Khan

Wali-e-Mewat Raja Khanzada Zakaria Khan Mewati, Bahadur, son of Khanzada Ahmad Khan Mewati, was the Khanzada Rajput ruler of Mewat from 1468 till 1485. He was succeeded by his son Khanzada Alawal Khan Mewati as Wali-e-Mewat in 1485.

Preceded by Khanzada Ahmad Khan	Wali-e-Mewat; 1468 – 1485	Succeeded by Khanzada Alawal Khan
