= Tijara =

- City
- Location in Rajasthan, India Tijara (India)
- Coordinates: 27.93°N 76.85°E
- Country: India
- State: Rajasthan
- District: Khairthal-Tijara
- Tehsil: Tijara

Government
  - Body: Government of Rajasthan
  - MLA: Mahant Balaknath (BJP)

Languages
  - Official: Hindi
  - Spoken: Rajasthani (Ahirwati, Mewati)
- Time zone: UTC+5:30 (IST)
- PIN: 301411
- Telephone code: 01469
- Lok Sabha constituency: Alwar
- Vidhan Sabha Constituency: Tijara

Tijara is a city and a municipality in Khairthal-Tijara district of the Indian state of Rajasthan. Tijara comes under the NCR area and is situated 55 km to the northeast of Alwar. The nearest railway station to Tijara is Khairthal. Bhiwadi is a census town in Tijara. It is the biggest industrial area of Rajasthan and part of the Ahirwal region. Ahirwal was a post-Mughal principality ruled by Ahirs.

== History ==
Tijara Fort was established by Maharaja of Parmar Rajputs, after which Rao Tej Pal, Raja of Sarahata as a scion of the Ahir family, repaired palaces at Tijara.

The city was largely inhabited by Ahirs or Muslim Meos since ancient times. The Ahir's from Tijara are settled in villages of Delhi. In 850 Vikram Samvat, Ahir King Charu Rao was the king of Tijara. His 9 descendants up to Rao Chandrabhanu Singh ruled tijara till 1040s. In around 1043 A.D, the family of Rao Harpal of tijara, son of chandrabhanu, settled his family in the Dabur area of modern Delhi, with its headquarters at Surhera. Rao Inderjit Singh is a descendant of Charu Rao. Ahirs from Tijara participated in Battle of Nasibpur under the leadership of Raja Rao Tula Ram and Pran Sukh Yadav. Rao Ruda Singh, an Ahir ruler of Tijara with his Ahir khap fought on the side of Humayun in battle against Sher Shah Suri. After the victory Humayun granted Jagirdari of Pargana to Ruda Singh( Prakrit word for Rudra) which later came to be known as Rewari. He cleared the jungle in Ahirwal in 1555 and founded new villages.

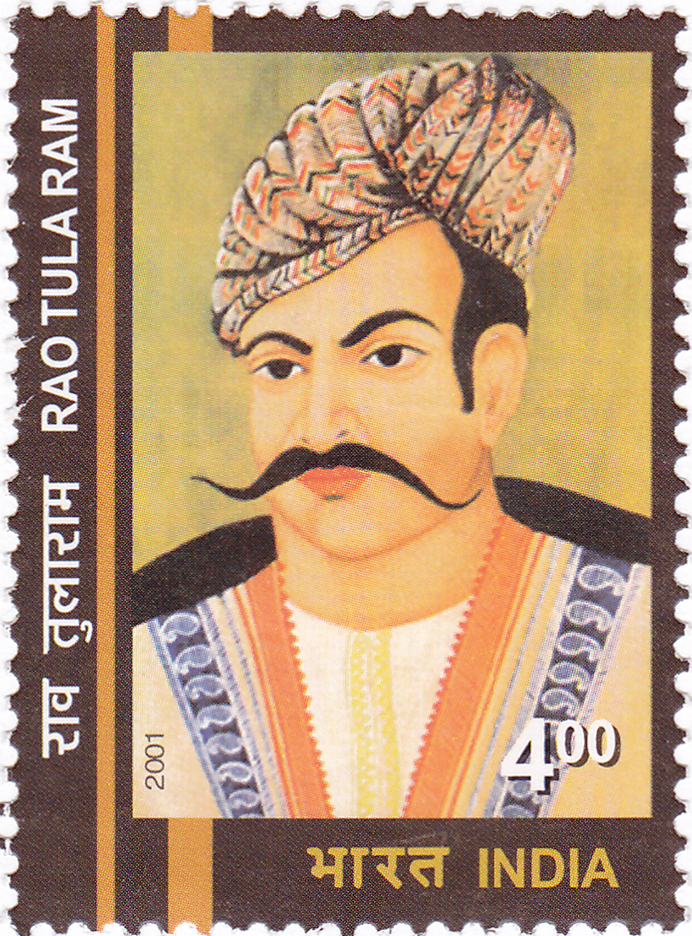
Raja Rao Tula Ram

An early mention of Tijara is found in the book, Mirat ul Masaud, which relates how Saiyad Ibrahim Mashhadi Barah Hazari (died 421 AH / 1030 CE), teacher of Ghazi Saiyyad Salar Masud, and an officer of Sultan Mahmud of Ghazni, in A.H. 420 (1030 CE) attacked Dhundgarh near Rewari, the Raja of which fled to his kinsman, Rao Tej Pal. The latter, in a night attack, killed Saiyad Ibrahim, but his disciple Ghazi Saiyyad Salar Masud compelled Tej Pal to flee to Tijara, where three relatives of Salar were killed in battle.

The descendants of Syed Maroofuddin, brother of Syed Salar Sahu, remained in Tijara till 1857 when they shifted to Bhopal during the rebellion of 1857. Many participated against British forces and were killed, but some Syed families are now living in Bhopal. Munshi Hakimuddin, who served as Chief Secretary at Bhopal during the reign of Shah Jahan Begum, is a direct descendant of Syed Maroofuddin Ghazi. The tombs of some associates of Syed Mohammad Dost (Nana Barah Hazari), Rukn Alam Shaheed, Roshan Shaheed, and Bhakan Shaheed in and around the town of Tijara are now places of pilgrimage.

Another tomb of the cousin of Saiyad Ibrahim Mashhadi (Barah Hazari), Syed Hameeduddin can also be seen at Kot Qasim (20 km away from Tijara), who was going as injured after the battle of Tijara to Rewari.

A sanad (decree conferring the title of property) of Akbar's time speaks of "Tijara Shahbad" as though they were the principal towns of a district.

In the Ain-i-Akbari, the Khanzada Rajputs tribe was living in Tijara, where they occupied a brick fort along with 405,108 bighas of land of which the annual revenue was 11,906,847 rupees. The tribe had 400 cavalry and 2000 infantry soldiers at its disposal. Tijara was a part of Mewat State, which was ruled by Khanzada Rajputs.

In 1402, after the death of Raja Nahar Khan, his kingdom was divided among his nine sons. His son, Malik Alaudin Khan, became the Jagirdar of Tijara. Khanzada Ikram Khan, a direct descendant of Malik Alaudin Khan, revolted against the Subahdar Khalilullah of Mewat during the era of Mughal Emperor, Aurangzeb. He removed the Subahdar from his post and fort and took control of Tijara and the surrounding districts. Subahdar Khalilullah went for an aide to Aurangzeb, who then sent Jai Singh I to crush the revolting Khanzada chief, Ikram Khan.

After decline of Mughal Empire, Rao Tej Singh (1766-1823) was ruler of Tijara. He was king or jagirdar of Kotkasim (region of Alwar), Tapukara (Tijara), Bawal, Taoru, Pataudi, Nuh, Hodal, Palwal, Sohna(Gurgaon) and surrounding areas, in addition to his jagir. Other Ahir jagir of Rewari comprised 360 villages. Rao Ganga Bishan Singh died in 1799. Thereafter, Rani Maya Kanwar appoints Rao Tej Singh, ruler of Taoru as her manager. He overthrow Iranian invader and businessman Jauki Ram and added Rewari Pargana (area other than Bawal) into his jagir. His jagirdari comprises a vast area of North East Rajasthan and South Haryana. He built bada talab in Rewari. He was grandfather of freedom fighter Rao Tula Ram and Rao Gopal Dev.

Dehra-Tijara was a well-developed region. The discovery of the image of Shri 1008 Bhagwan Chandraprabhu in 1956 has a remarkable history.

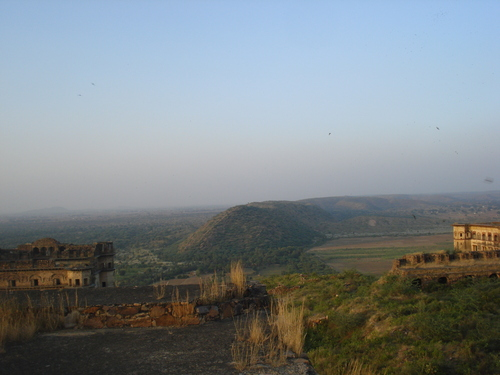
Tijara fort, now a heritage hotel

Khanzadas Community in large number also lived in this town before partition in 1947. Fateh Naseeb Khan of the Khanzada community, who was the Commander-in-chief of Alwar State in early 1930s, hailed from Tijara.

Tijara Fort was converted into a heritage hotel by the Neemrana Hotels group. The Tijari fort at Alwar is not a ruin but a building that had been left unfinished in 1845 because of war; the Neemrana Hotels has undertaken completion.

== Jain Temple ==
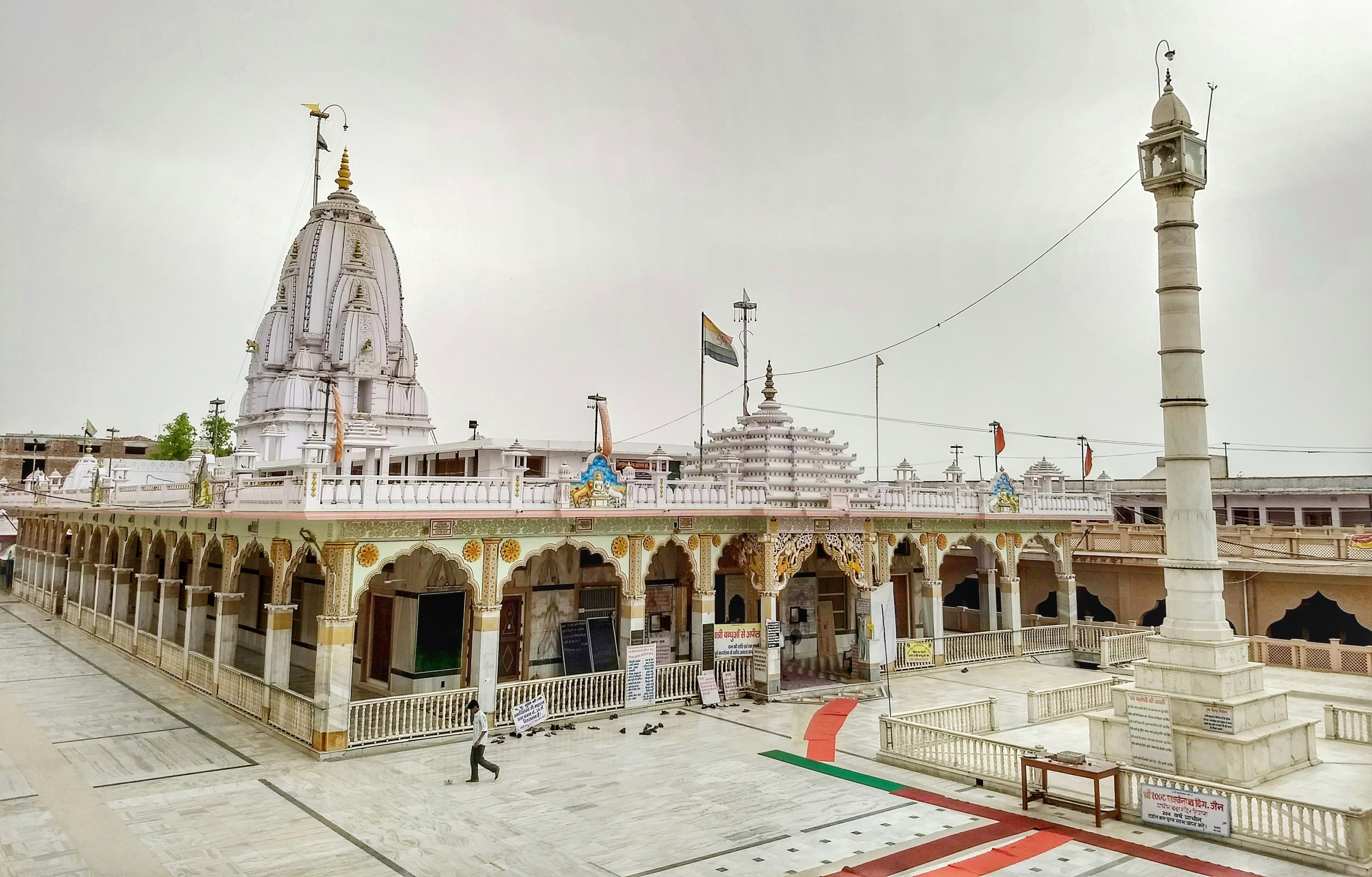
Tijara Jain Temple

In 1956, the excavation work was taken up for the widening of the roads. While digging, a small "Talghar" was found. Saraswati Devi discovered an idol on Shravan Shukla Dashmi. The image bears the date "Vaishakh Shukla 3,1554 Vikram Samvat". Later on, one white idol of god Chandraprabhu was discovered on 29 March 1972 by Acharya Vimal Sagar.

== Geography ==
Tijara is located at 27.93°N 76.85°E. It has an average elevation of 291 metres (954 feet). Tijara can be reached via State Highway 25 (Rajasthan) which connects Gangapur city with Daruhera via Bhiwadi. Guwalda is biggest village in population and area in Tijara tehsil. Nearby towns are Ferozepur Jhirka and Nuh in Haryana, and Alwar, Tapukara, Bhiwadi, and Kishangarh Bas in Rajasthan.

== Demographics ==
As of 2001 India census, Tijara had a population of 19,918. Males constitute 53% of the population and females, 47%. Tijara has an average literacy rate of 62%, higher than the national average of 59.5%: male literacy is 72%, and female literacy is 51%. In Tijara, 18% of the population is under 6 years of age.

== Notable people ==
- Advocate Nasiruddin (1892–1949), lawyer, political and social leader

== See also ==
- Alwar State
