= Uchchain =

Uchchain Uchchain
- Town
- Location in Rajasthan, India Uchchain (India)
- Coordinates: 27°05′35″N 77°24′35″E
- Country: India
- State: Rajasthan
- District: Bharatpur

Government
  - Type: Democratic
  - Body: Nagar Palika ( announced in budget 2020 )

Population (2011)
  - Total: 8,713

Languages
  - Official: Hindi
- Time zone: UTC+5:30 (IST)
- PIN: 321302
- Vehicle registration: RJ05

Uchchain is a town and a Nagar Palika in Bharatpur district in the state of Rajasthan, India.

== Communities ==
The Gurjars are dominant here.Chhavdi and Kanmar gotra of Gurjars are here. The Brahmins, vaishya, jats, jatavs, kushwaha also lived here. Braj language is mostly used in uchchain.
