= Nadbai =

Town in Bharatpur in Rajasthan, India

- City
- Location in Rajasthan, India Nadbai (India)
- Coordinates: 27.23°N 77.2°E
- Country: India
- State: Rajasthan
- District: Bharatpur
- Elevation: 205 m (673 ft)

Population (2011)
  - Total: 26,411
- Time zone: UTC+5:30 (IST)
- PIN: 321602
- Telephone code: 05643
- ISO 3166 code: IN-RJ
- Vehicle registration: RJ05

Nadbai is a city and a municipality in Bharatpur district in the Indian state of Rajasthan. Nadbai is administratively divided into Katra and Nadbai. It is also a subdivisional and tehsil headquarter in Bharatpur district.

== History ==
It is believed that around 1000 years ago a man named Nanda gurjar mavi or Nandoo, who was a milkan from nearby village Katara, populated this village and the village was named after him. Alternately it is believed that during the British Raj, this town couldn't be captured, so people called it "Na Dabi", which means "not captured"; later it became Nadbai.

== Geography ==
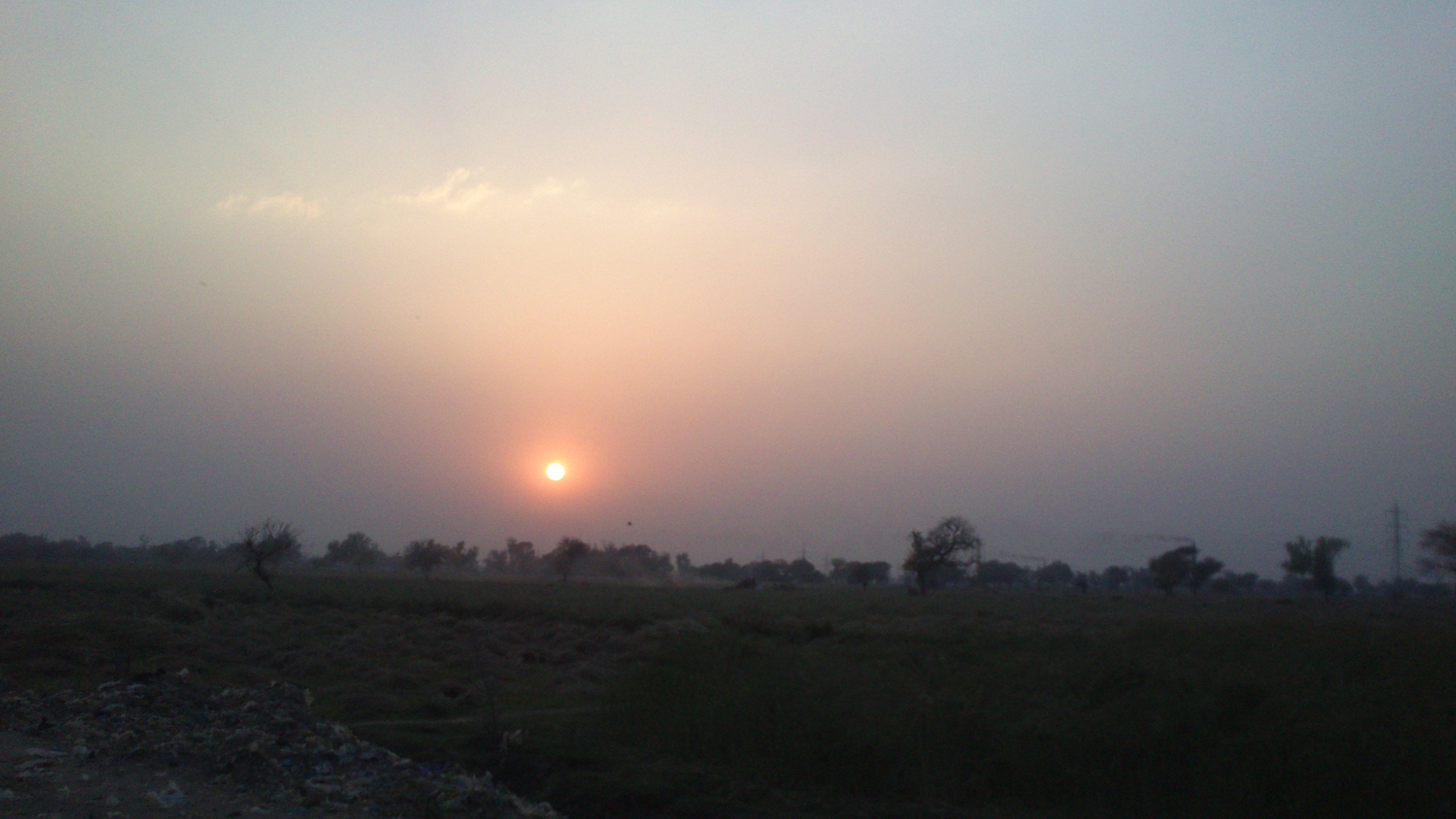
Sunset in Nadbai

Nadbai is located at 27.23°N 77.2°E. It has an average elevation of 205 metres (672 feet)

== Demographics ==
As of 2011 India census, Nadbai had a population of 26,300. Males constitute 54% of the population and females 46%. Nadbai has an average literacy rate of 64%, higher than the national average of 74.04%: male literacy is 75%, and female literacy is 53%. In Nadbai, 15% of the population is under 6 years of age.

== Transport ==
=== Rail ===
It is on the Jaipur-Agra rail route. The nearest railway station is Nadbai Railway Station around 0.5 km from city centre. One can catch trains for Jaipur, Ajmer, Udaipur, Jodhpur, Agra, Varanasi, Lucknow, Gwalior, Khajuraho and other various parts of country from Bharatpur Junction which is around 30 kilometres from here.

=== Road ===
It is about 10 km from NH-21 via Dehra Mod road and 13 km via halena road . Buses are always available for Jaipur and Bharatpur from local bus stand. One can get down on Dehra Mod which is on Jaipur Agra national Highway and 10 km from Nadbai. Public transport like auto rikshaw, tempo are available from Dehra Mod to Nadbai.

== See also ==
- Bharatpur
- Bharatpur district
- Deeg district
- Suraj Mal
- Lohagarh Fort
- History of Bharatpur
