= Bhusawar =

- City
- Location in Rajasthan, India Bhusawar (India)
- Coordinates: 27°2′10″N 77°3′10″E
- Country: India
- State: Rajasthan
- District: Bharatpur

Government
  - Type: Municipality

Area
  - Total: 30 km^{2} (12 sq mi)

Population (2011)
  - Total: 19,946
  - Density: 660/km^{2} (1,700/sq mi)

Languages
  - Official: Hindi
- Time zone: UTC+5:30 (IST)
- PIN: 321406
- Vehicle registration: RJ05

Bhusawar is a city and a municipality in Bharatpur district in the state of Rajasthan, India.

== Location ==
Bhusawar is situated about 55 km from Bharatpur and 138 km from state capital Jaipur. Bhusawar is the Tehsil Headquarter of Bhusawar Tehsil of Bharatpur district. It is famous for pickles. Nithar (India)

== History ==
R. D. Banerji identified Bhusawar with the Vusāvaṭa mentioned in an inscription from nearby Bayana dated to 8 January 955. The inscription records that a woman named Chittralekhā (possibly the queen consort to the Kachchhapaghata dynasty king Maṅgalarāja of Gwalior) founded a temple to Vishnu at an unspecified location and endowed it with certain revenue grants for its upkeep. Among these revenue grants was a sum of three drammas from the maṇḍapikā (marketplace) in Vusāvaṭa, possibly collected as an octroi fee on every horse-load of goods brought to the town's marketplace.
