= Bharatpur district =

Coordinates: 27°13′12″N 77°30′00″E

- District of Rajasthan
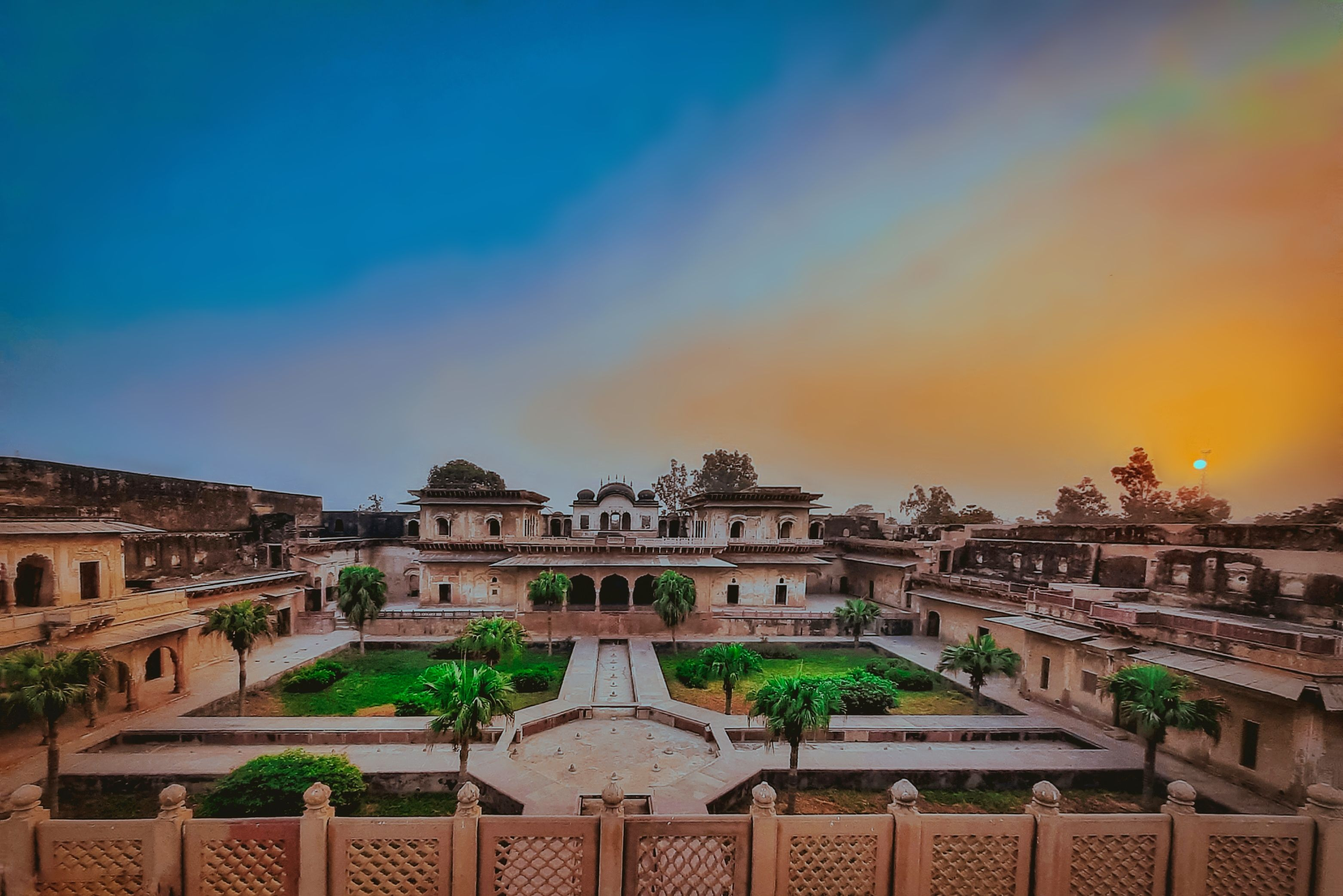
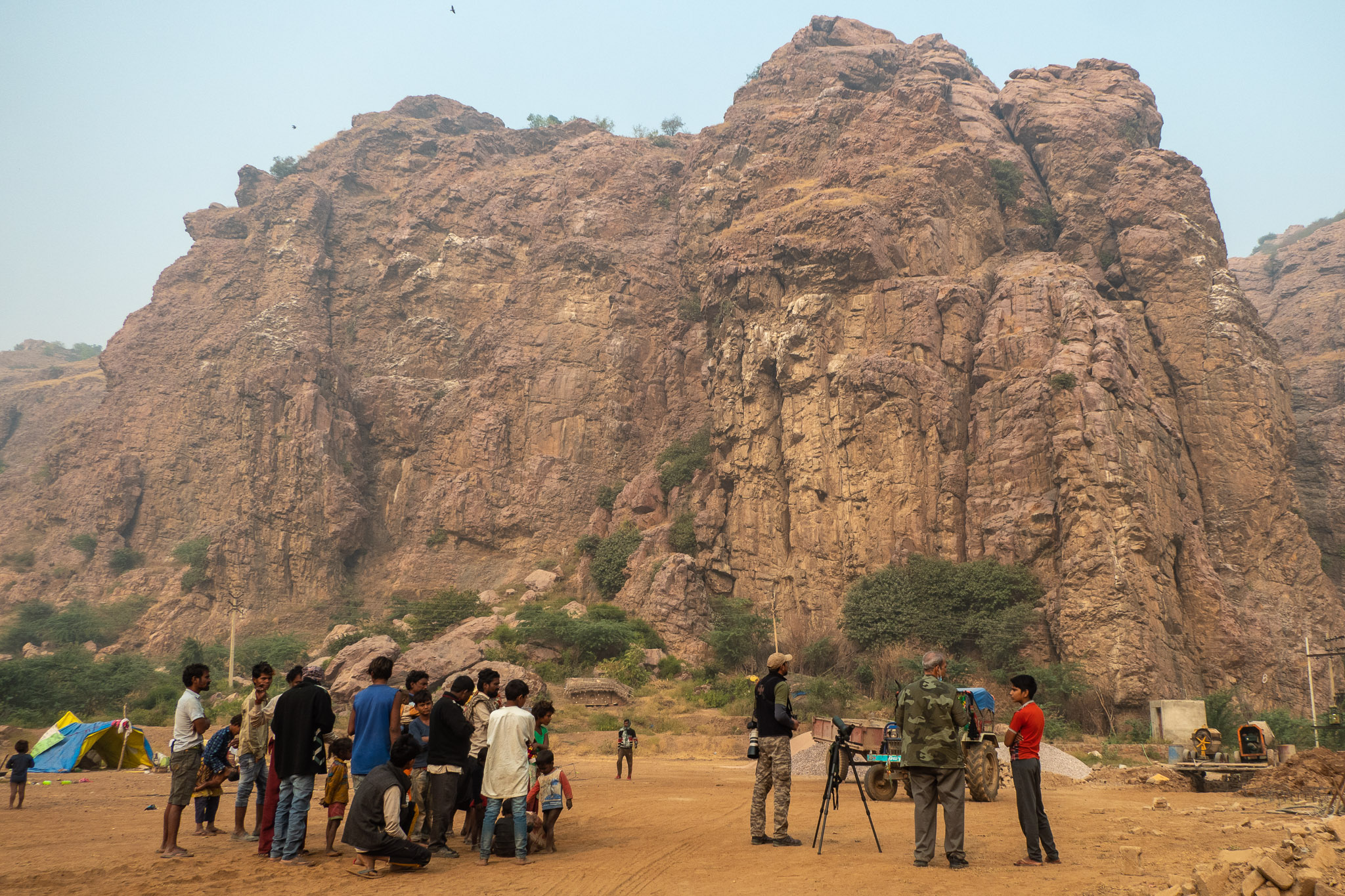
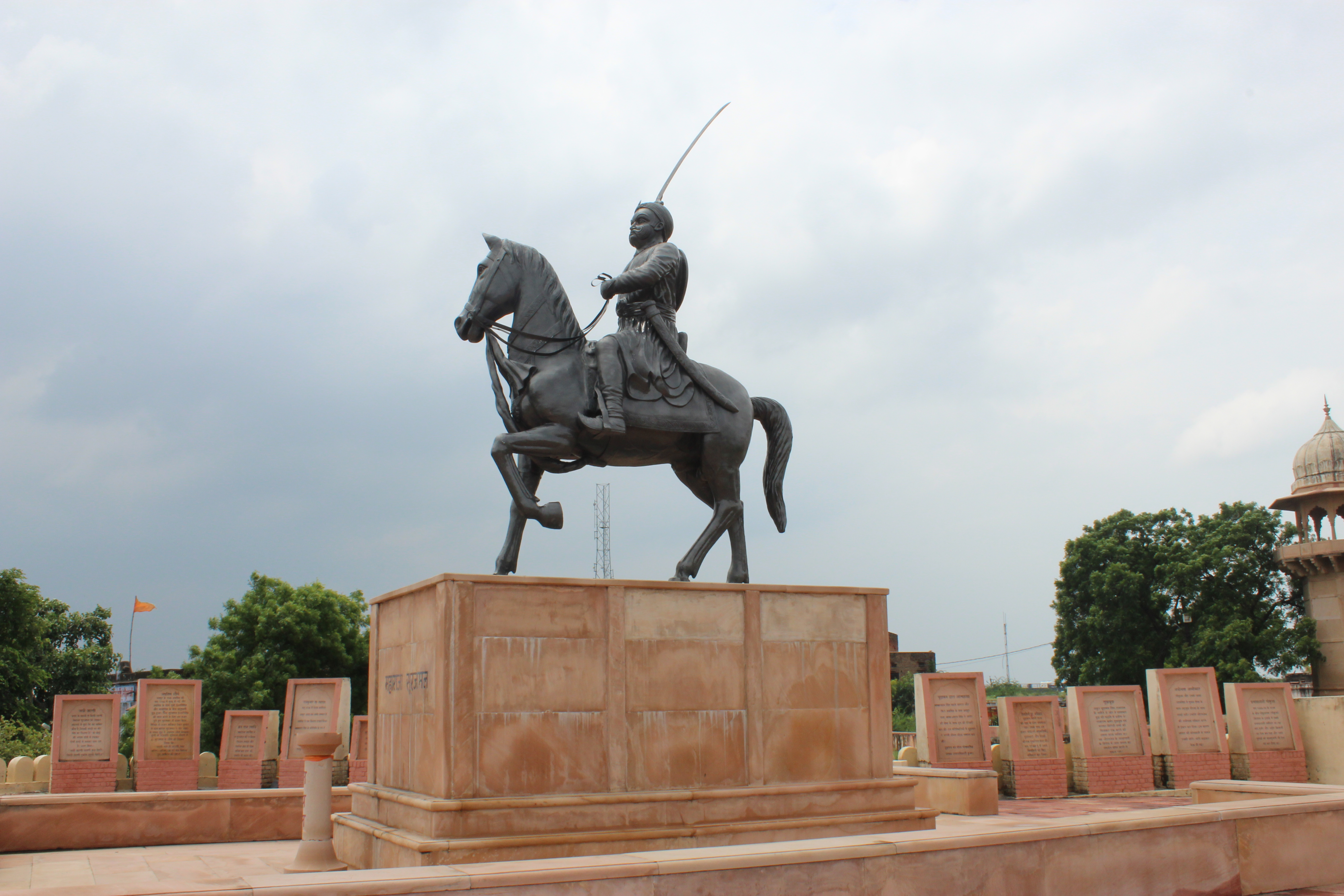
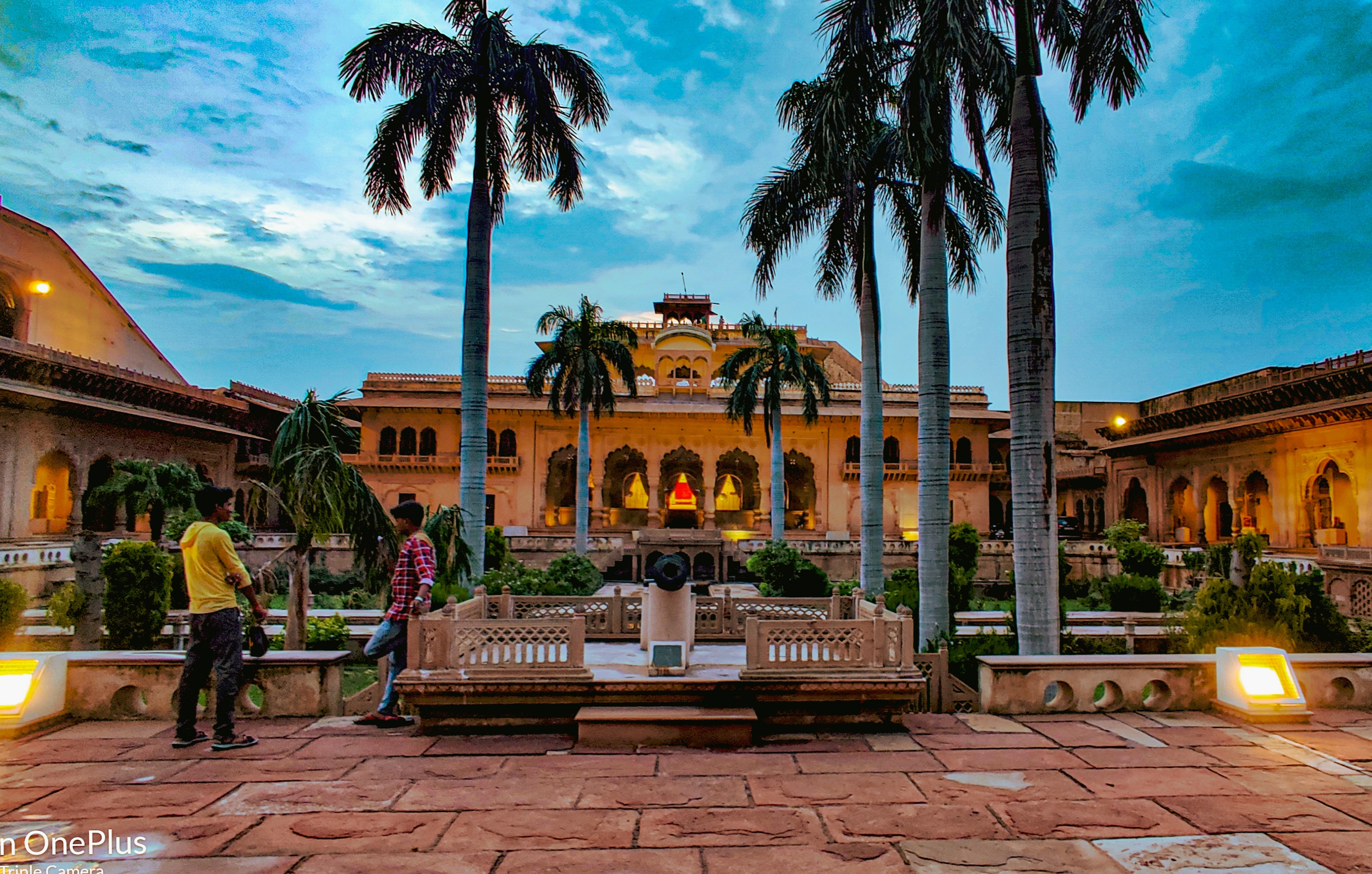
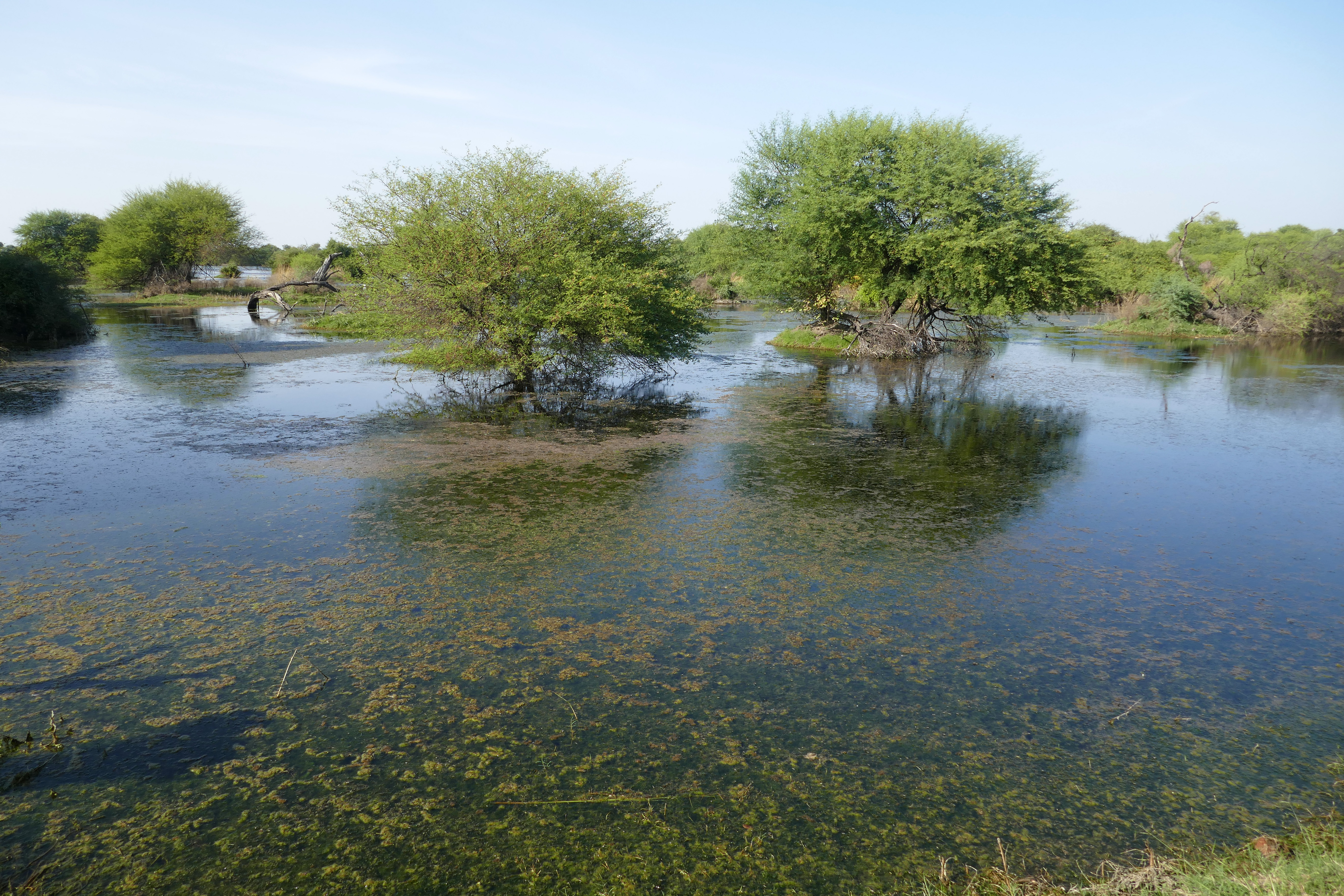
- Clockwise from top-left: Deeg Palace, cliffs at Bayana, Government Museum, Bharatpur, Keoladeo National Park, Statue of Maharaja Surajmal at Lohagarh Fort

- Location of Bharatpur district in Rajasthan
- Country: India
- State: Rajasthan
- Division: Bharatpur
- Headquarters: Bharatpur

Government
  - Divisional Commissioner: Sanwar Mal Verma, IAS
  - District Collector & Magistrate: Qummer Ul Zaman Choudhary, IAS

Area
  - Total: 5,066 km^{2} (1,956 sq mi)

Population (2011)
  - Total: 2,548,462
  - Density: 503.1/km^{2} (1,303/sq mi)
- Time zone: UTC+05:30 (IST)
- Website: Bharatpur District

Bharatpur district is a district in Rajasthan state in western India. The city of Bharatpur is the District Headquarters, Division Headquarters and Headquarters of Bharatpur

== History ==
=== Vedic era ===
Bharatpur is a place with association with vedic era importance. In common belief, the Pandavas had spent their 13th year of exile at this place around 3,500 years ago. In June 2025, excavations at bajna village, 3 km east of Deeg city, by the Rajasthan State Government Department of Archaeology found the artifacts belonging to mahabharta-era (vedic era), Maurya Empire and Shunga Empire which included pottery and terracotta statues some of which could be as old as 2500 to 2700 years old. A human skeleton was also found, which has been sent to Israel for the further scientific studies to determine the age and culture of the specimen. This area is part of Mahabharta era 84-kos Vraja Parikrama associated with the Lord Krishna.

=== Sultanate era ===
In early medieval times, the Bharatpur region was ruled under the Mewat State under the Khanzadas of Mewat from 1372 to 1527 AD who are mostly rajput converted to Islam.

=== Hindu era ===
The area in later medieval times was ruled by the Sinsinwar clan of the Hindu Jats. In 1733 AD, Maharajah Suraj Mal built the city of Bharatpur as a well-fortified city which was carved out from the Mewat region and named it after the Bharat, Lord Rama's younger brother. Jat conquered Agra and ruled it over decade.

As recorded by the historian Aziz Ahmad, Jats led by Rajaram Jat attacked and plundered Akbar's the tomb in 1685 during the reign of Aurangzeb after defeating Mughal forces. Jats looted gold, silver, and gems from the tomb, damaged the mausoleum, and destroyed items they could not carry. According to Niccolao Manucci, the Jats also burned Akbar's remains and bones, further plundered nearby villages that maintained the Taj Mahal, setting them ablaze, and attacked Mughal officials at Palwal while ransacking the Khurja pargana.

== Geography ==
=== Topography ===
Bharatpur, also known as ‘Eastern Gate of Rajasthan’, is located in the Braj region 180 km away from Delhi. Geographically, the district is situated between 26° 22' and 27° 83' N and 76° 53' and 78° 17' E and its average height above sea level is around 183 m. Bharatpur city is the district headquarters and is also known by the name of Lohagarh. It is situated very close to the main cities of Rajasthan and other states. Distance between Jaipur and Bharatpur is around 178 km whereas Agra lies at a distance of 55 km from the district. Mathura is located at a distance of 34 km. Bharatpur touches Deeg district of Rajasthan in the north, Mathura in the east, Agra of Uttar Pradesh and Dholpur of Rajasthan in the south and Dausa and Alwar in the west.

=== Hydrology ===
There are only three main seasonal rivers in this District, namely Ban Ganga, Rooparel and Gambhir. Ban Ganga starts from Ramgarh Dam of Jaipur district, passes from Bharatpur and meets in river Gambhir near tehsil Bayana of District Bharatpur. Gambhir river starts from Panchna Dam of district Karauli and after passing from Bharatpur meets River Yamuna in Uttar Pradesh. Rooparel River starts from hills of district Alwar and enters into Bharatpur from tehsil Kaman. Instead of this, a Dam, namely, Bandh Baretha, is situated near the village Baretha on river Kakund, which starts from the hills of district Karauli. The water of this dam is used for drinking and irrigation purpose for this district. The capacity of this dam is 684.00 million cubic feet (29 Gaze feet).

== Demographics ==
=== Population ===
Historical population
Year	Pop.	±% p.a.
1901	597,736	—
1911	547,233	−0.88%
1921	483,536	−1.23%
1931	493,852	+0.21%
1941	574,192	+1.52%
1951	604,896	+0.52%
1961	785,805	+2.65%
1971	1,029,930	+2.74%
1981	1,298,278	+2.34%
1991	1,650,724	+2.43%
2001	2,100,020	+2.44%
2011	2,548,462	+1.95%
2020 est.	2,861,513	+1.30%

In the 2011 census, the Bharatpur District had a population of 2,548,462, roughly equal to the nation of Kuwait or the US state of Nevada. This gave it a ranking of 166th among districts of India (out of a total of 640). The district had a population density of 503 inhabitants per square kilometre (1,300/sq mi). Its population growth rate over the decade 2001-2011 was 21.32%. Bharatpur had a sex ratio of 877 females for every 1000 males, and a literacy rate of 71.16%.

Religions in residual Bharatpur district (2011)
Religion	Percent
Hinduism	97.23%
Islam	1.97%
Other or not stated	0.80%

After the separation of Deeg district, the residual Bharatpur district has a population of 1,475,707. The district has a sex ratio of 869 females per 1000 males. 362,948 (24.59%) lived in urban areas. Scheduled Castes and Scheduled Tribes made up 394,106 (26.71%) and 43,421 (2.94%) of the population respectively.

=== Languages ===
Languages of Bharatpur district (2011)
1. Hindi (71.5%)
2. Braj Bhasha (27.6%)
3. Others (0.91%)

At the time of the 2011 census, 71.45% of the population in the residual district spoke Hindi and 27.64% Braj as their first language. Most speakers of Braj dialect record their language generically as Hindi in the census.

== Government and politics ==
=== Administrative divisions ===
Bharatpur District has many revenue subdivisions and tehsils. They have the same names and borders, except that Weir Subdivision is divided into Weir and Bhusawar. The other ten tehsils are: Bayana, Bharatpur, Nadbai, Uchchain and Roopwas (Rupbas).

Bharatpur District: Revenue Scheme
Subdivision	Land Record Circles (ILRCs)	Patwar Circles	Villages Occupied	Villages Abandoned	Villages Total
Bayana	6	51	181	16	197
Bharatpur	6	57	185	21	206
Kumher	5	47	128	7	135
Nadbai	5	47	121	4	125
Roopwas	5	49	148	16	164
Weir	5	51	154	8	162
Uchchain					
Bhusawar					

== Economy ==
=== Industrial areas ===
Bharatpur District has been divided in six industrial areas:

1. Old Industrial Area Bharatpur
2. Brij Industrial Area Bharatpur
3. Industrial Area Bayana
4. I.I.D. Center Bayana

=== Oil industries ===
Bharatpur district is known not only for agriculture production but also known for oil industries. Mustard seeds and other agriculture products come to the market through mandies established by Krishi Upaj Mandi Samiti and transported all over the country. These Krishi Upaj Mandies are in Bharatpur, Nadbai, Weir, Bayana, Roopwas and Bhusawar.

There are total 554 oil mills registered in which 2317 persons are employed and Rs. 2690.84 lacs was invested. Out of these mills 78 are big units having AGMARK and rest are small oil expeller units.

=== Other ===
In some areas of Bharatpur District like- Hindaun & Karauli etc. stone quarrying is also practised. Many of nearby State's Forts like The Red Fort of Delhi, Agra Fort, and Fatehpur Sikari were built using local stone.

== Notable people ==
- Maharaja Suraj Mal (February 1707 – 25 December 1763) was Jat ruler of Bharatpur
- Acharya Rajendrasuri (1826–1906), Jain reformer was born in Bharatpur.
- Natwar Singh (born 1931), Minister of External Affairs of India.
- Jagannath Pahadia (1932–2021), Chief Minister of Rajasthan and Governor of Haryana.

== Transport ==
=== Air ===
Agra Airport at Agra, 55 km east of Bharatpur is the nearest airport.

=== Rail ===
Bharatpur Junction railway station, 5 km north of Keoladeo National Park, has regular rail services connecting Bharatpur with all the major cities such as Delhi, Mumbai, Jaipur and Agra.

=== Road ===
By road, SH-33 connects it to Mathura (40 km northeast) and then via NH-44 to Delhi (184 km from Bharatpur), Agra-Jaipur Road to Agra (55 km east) and Jaipur (190 km west), SH-43 to Chambal region in the south, SH-1 (via SH-43) to Hindaun city (80 km southwest).

== See also ==
- List of districts of Rajasthan
