= Mewat =

Historical and cultural region in northwestern India

- Historical region
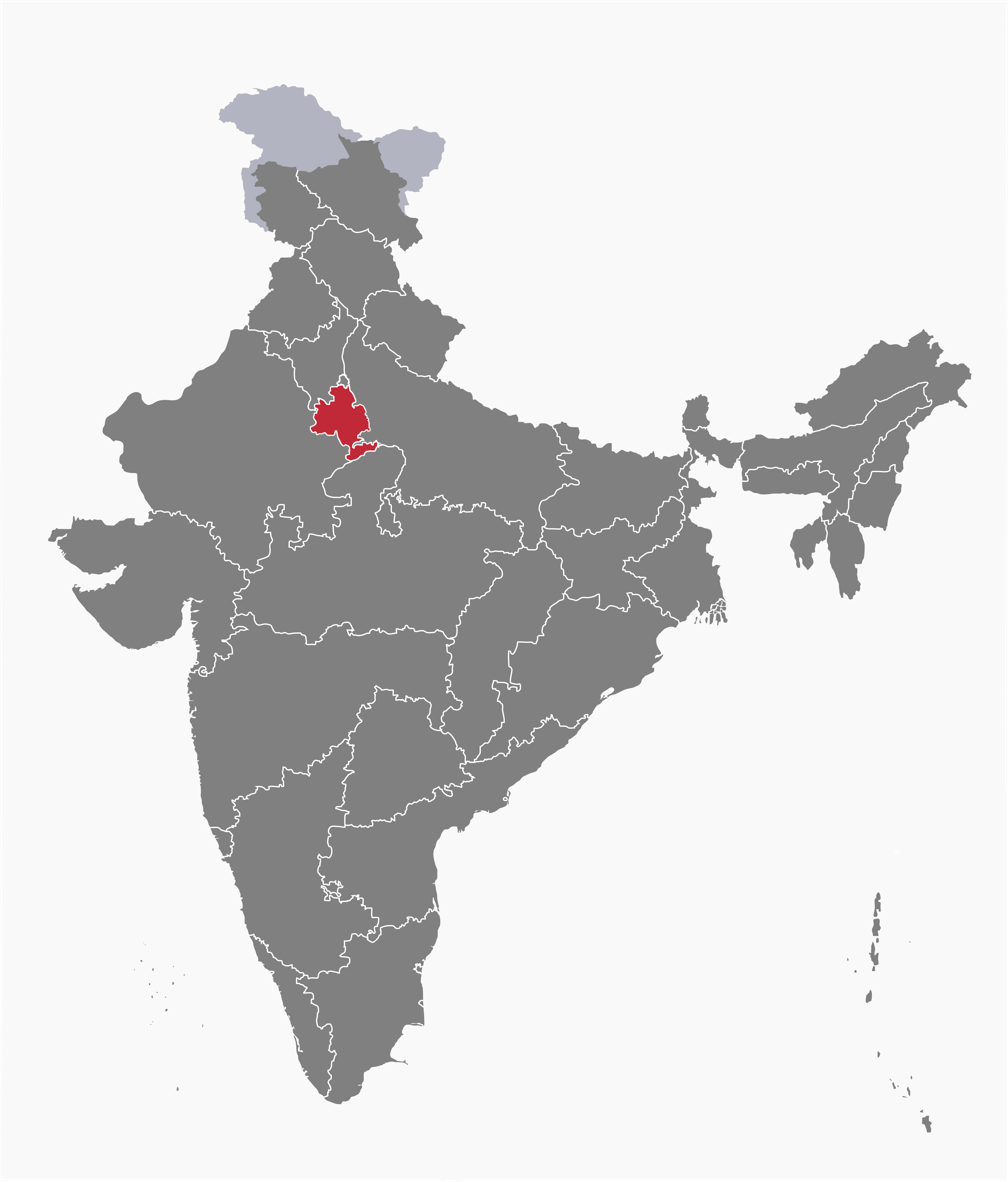
- Location of Mewat in India
- Country: India
- Historical capital: Alwar
- Demonym: Mewati

Languages
  - Spoken: English, Hindi, Urdu

Mewat (/ˈmeɪwɑːt/; Hindustani: [ˈmeːwaːt]) is a historical and cultural region which encompasses parts of the modern-day states of Haryana, Rajasthan, and Uttar Pradesh in northwestern India.

== Geography ==
The loose boundaries of the Mewat region generally include parts of the following districts:

- Nuh district (Nuh, Punahana, Ferozepur Jhirka, Taoru) of Haryana
- Palwal district (Palwal, Hathin, Hodal) of Haryana
- Faridabad district (Faridabad, Badhkal, Ballabgarh) of Haryana
- Gurugram district (Sohna) of Haryana
- Alwar district (Tijara, Kishangarh Bas, Ramgarh, Laxmangarh, Kathumar, Aravalli hills tract) of Rajasthan
- Dausa district (Mahwa, Mandawar) of Rajasthan
- Bharatpur district (Pahari, Nagar, Deeg, Nadbai, Bhusawar, Weir, Kaman) of Rajasthan.
- Mathura district (Chhata) of Uttar Pradesh

The region is located at the intersection of three states: Rajasthan, Haryana, and Uttar Pradesh. In between the major cities of Delhi, Jaipur and Agra. The historical capital of the region is Alwar in modern-day Rajasthan. Mewat is also part of the historical Braj region of India.

The region roughly corresponds to the ancient kingdom of Matsya, founded in the 5th century BCE.

== History ==
=== Classical era ===
There is little mention of the Mewat region in the classical era, although there are many speculative stories and legends. However, the earliest supposed records of this region and its surroundings can be found in the Mahabharata. The Bhadanakas are clearly related to the ancient Bhadras mentioned in the Sanskrit epic as a republic or oligarchy that Karna conquered during his expeditions. These Bhadanakas are located in the Rewari-Bhiwani area, and Bhadavasa, a present-day village located nearby confirms their historic presence.

=== Medieval era ===
After the fall of the Maurya Empire, this place has seen foreign invaders like the Bactrians, Greeks, Parthians, Scythians, and the Kushanas. Samudragupta and Yashovarman had also ruled the area. The Mewat region was also part of the Harsha Empire during the first half of the century 7th century, then Gurjara-Pratiharas. The Tomaras, who were once the Pratiharas' feudatories but eventually gained independence, established the foundation of Delhi, then known as Dhillika, in 736 AD. The northern Mewat region was ruled by the Tomaras until Visaladeva (Chahamana) captured Delhi around the year 1156.

In 1206, Muhammad of Ghor invaded Delhi and Qutb ud-Din Aibak became the first Sultan of Delhi. During his reign, Hemraj, the son of Prithviraj, was assigned to invade Mewat from Alwar, but he was defeated. Aibak then dispatched Sayyid Wajih-ud-Din, who was also defeated. It was Wajih-ud-Din's nephew, Miran Hussain Jang, who then conquered Mewat. Meos, the native ethnic group of the region, were introduced to Islam and became Muslim under Qutb ud-Din's rule.

==== Balban's campaigns in Mewat ====
In the mid-13th century, Ghias-ud-din Balban, who was once the regent of Nasiruddin Mahmud Shah (8th Sultan of Delhi), launched several brutal military campaigns against the Mewat region to consolidate and expand the Sultanate's control. Over the course of 20 years and three major campaigns, Balban killed around two thousand Meos.

In 1247, Balban led his first invasion of Mewat. The local Meo chief, Ransi Ran Pal (also known as Ant Pal), had provided refuge to a Delhi rebel leader, prompting Balban's intervention. Balban's forces engaged in a pitched battle, resulting in heavy casualties among the Mewatis and forcing the rebels to flee. By 1260, the Mewatis had regrouped under a new leader, Malkha. In response to ongoing raids and unrest, Balban launched a second campaign. His forces captured Mewat's operations capital, and conducted a thorough and brutal suppression of the rebels. Over a twenty-day period, Balban's troops ravaged villages and executed many inhabitants. The campaign was noted for its cruelty, including public executions and severe punishments for captured rebels.

In 1266, after ascending the throne as Sultan, Balban conducted his third major campaign against Mewat. The Meo leader during this period was Kaku Rana, who attempted to resist Balban's forces with limited success. Balban's army subdued the region. The aftermath of this campaign saw the establishment of police posts and forts to maintain control, with Balban implementing policies to clear the forests and settle loyal soldiers in the region.

This type of cruel treatment was common throughout the period of the Delhi Sultanate, and it became a standard way of treating the Meos. It seems that in spite of the Meos' conversion to Islam, they were just as turbulent as their Hindu ancestors and did not assimilate well with the Delhi Sultans. The last operation of Balban was so effectual that there is little to no mention of Mewat for over a hundred years, during which the chiefs of Mewat appear to have maintained satisfactory relations with the authorities in Delhi.

==== Wali-e-Mewat era ====
During the Wali-e-Mewat era, the Mewat region was ruled as a tributary to the Delhi Sultanate by the Khanzada Rajputs, a distinct ethnic identity separate from the Meos. In 1398, during the time of the invasion of Timur and during the rule of Delhi Sultan Firuz Shah Tughlaq, one of the most dominant Jadaun Rajput chiefs in the region was Sonpar Pal, popularly known as Bahadur Nahar, whose tomb still stands at Alwar. Sonpar Pal converted to Islam through Firuz Shah Tughlaq in 1355 and adopted the new name, Nahar Khan Mewati (not to be confused with Jat king Nahar Singh). He became the patriarch of Khanzada Rajputs. He had also constructed the Kotla Bahadur Nahar fort in the Kotla village of present-day Nuh.

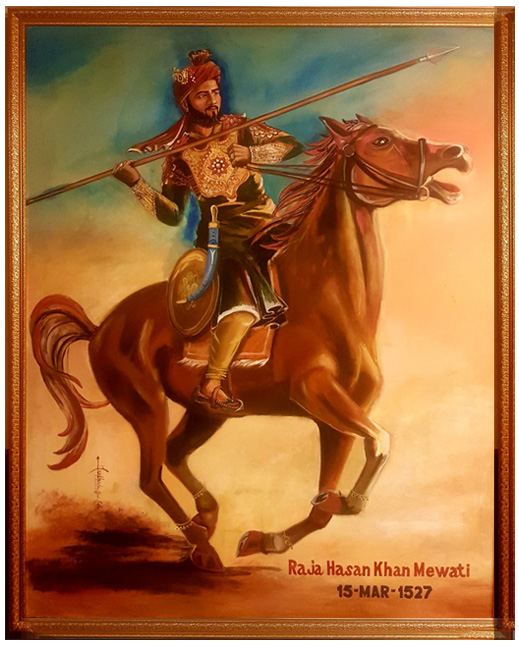
Raja Hasan Khan Mewati, the last ruler of the independent Mewat State.

Bahadur Nahar had helped Abu Bakr Shah, the grandson of Tughlaq, in expelling Abu Bakr's uncle, Ghiyath-ud-din Tughluq Shah, from Delhi and in establishing the Abu Bakr Shah on the throne. After the fall of Tughlaq dynasty in 1398, Nahar Khan reconciled with Timur. In 1420, during the era of Nahar Khan's grandson, Khanzada Feroz Khan, Mewat was attacked by Sultan Khizr Khan of Delhi Sayyid dynasty. The Mewati army fortified themselves for one year in Kotla Fort, after which the Delhi army retreated. In 1425, great-grandsons of Bahadur Nahar named Khanzada Jalal Khan and Khanzada Abdul Qadir Khan (Jallu and Qaddu) revolted against Delhi Sultanate but were defeated by Delhi Sultan Mubarak Shah (1421– 1434 CE) who overran Mewat and killed Qaddu. Jallu continued the native Mewati rebellion against the Delhi sultanate, in 1427, the Mewati army fortified themselves for one year in the hills of Tijara, after which the Delhi army retreated.

In 1526, Hasan Khan Mewati, the last Khanzada Rajput ruler of Mewat, supported Ibrahim Lodi, the Sultan of Delhi, in the first Battle of Panipat. This battle was a pivotal conflict between the founder of the Mughal Empire, Babur, and the Sultanate of Delhi, led by Ibrahim Lodi. In this battle, Babur emerged victorious, and Lodi lost his life. During the conflict, Babur took Hasan Khan Mewati's son as a hostage. Despite the defeat, Hasan Khan Mewati did not yield to the foreign invader. Babur had stated that Hasan Khan Mewati was the leader of the ‘Mewat country’. Following the Battle of Panipat, Hasan Khan Mewati aligned himself with Rana Sanga to continue the fight against Babur and the Mughal Empire. In March 15, 1527, the Battle of Khanwa occurred, between Rana Sanga of Mewar and Babur. Hasan Khan Mewati, once again, went against Babur and joined the Rajput Confederation of Rana Sanga with 5,000 allies. When Rana Sanga was struck by an arrow and fell from his elephant, the Mewati king took charge of the commander's flag and led the attack against Babur's forces. Hasan Khan Mewati along with his 12,000 Meo horse soldiers, fiercely confronted Babur's army. They were initially successful and seemed to be overpowering the Mughal forces. During the battle, Hasan Khan Mewati was struck by a cannonball that hit his chest. the injury proved fatal, and Hasan Khan Mewati lost his life in the midst of the battle.

=== Mughal era ===
The consequences of the Battle of Khanwa affected the fortunes of a number of Indian chiefs, though in varying degrees, but the Khanzadas of Mewat were the worst hit. The territory of Mewat was annexed by Babur and this shifted the control of Mewat from the Khanzadas to the Mughals.

The Khanzadas ceased to be a significantly influential regional political entity. Nevertheless, the Mughal emperors endeavored to integrate the Khanzadas by establishing matrimonial alliances or incorporating them into the administration. For example, when Humayun regained his power in 1555 CE, he sought to consolidate his position by marrying the elder daughter of Jamal Khan Mewati, the nephew of Hasan Khan. Simultaneously, his prominent Turkish noble, Bairam Khan, married the younger daughter. According to Arzang-i-Tijara, the infamous Mughal emperor, Akbar, also married the daughter of Hasan Khan's brother, although this event is not recorded in Persian chronicles. Additionally, Akbar also married Bairam Khan’s widow, who was the daughter of Jamal Khan.

During the reign of Akbar, the Mewat region was integrated into the Mughal Empire, divided into four sarkars—Alwar, Tijara, Sahar, and Rewari—comprising 67 parganas within the subas of Agra and Delhi. The region's strategic location was economically advantageous due to its suitability for cash crops like indigo, sugarcane, and cotton, and its proximity to Agra and Delhi facilitated grain transport, essential for feeding the Mughal army and urban populations. Control over Mewat was crucial for safeguarding Agra and Delhi.

The Khanzadas were absorbed into the Mughal polity as zamindars, while the Meos were employed in lower administrative roles. Akbar employed many Meo boys as post carriers and palace guards, transforming them from notorious thieves to loyal servants. This integration extended to social assimilation, with Meos starting to adopt Islamic customs and rituals due to their regular interaction with the Mughal court. This also created a greater social divide between the Khanzada Rajputs and the Meos. Akbar also utilized Mewat's resources by setting up horse-training centers, utilizing local artisans and trainers. The region was known for salt and iron production, with significant trade in these commodities. During the Mughal period, the qasbas in Mewat served various functions, from pargana headquarters to centers of trade and manufacturing.

The administrative integration of Mewat also contributed to the peasantization of the Meos, who gained zamindari rights over several parganas. This process intensified post-Akbar, with the Meos' peasant households forming a significant part of Alwar state's population by the British era. However, this growth often came at the expense of the Khanzadas, who suffered socio-economic decline.

During Aurangzeb (Akbar's great-grandson)'s rule, he sent Jai Singh I to crush the revolting Khanzada chief Ikram Khan, the Jagir of Tijara, a descendant of Raja Nahar Khan (through his son Malik Alaudin Khan). Aurangzeb was responsible for major conversations to Islam in the Mewat region. As generations passed and as most of the Meos became Muslim, the ethnic term 'Meo' became specific and almost synonymous with the term Muslim, which is in effect till date.

After the death of Aurangzeb, Badshapur was under the Hindu Badgurjar King, Hathi Singh and the Nuh area were under the Jat king of Bharatpur State, Maharaja Suraj Mal. The Maratha ruler, Mahadaji Shinde, had conquered most of the region from the Jats and northern Mewat came under the Maratha Confederacy. All of the Gurgaon district area of Punjab (which consisted of present-day districts of Faridabad, Rewari, and Mahendargah and Nuh) was conquered by French generals in late 18th century. Daulat Rao Sindhia, the successor of Shinde, ceded the Gurgaon region to the British on 30 December 1803 under the Treaty of Surji-Anjangaon to the British East India Company leading to the Company rule in India.

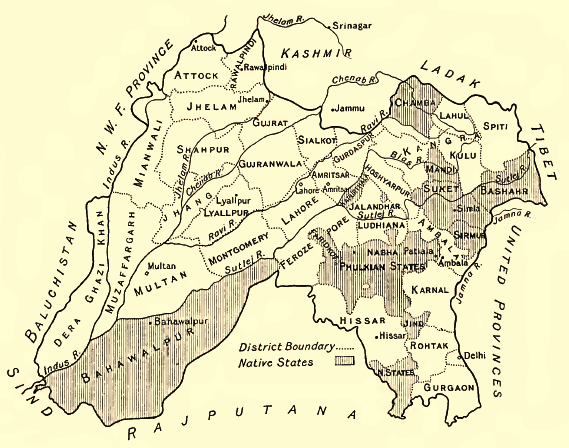
Map of the Punjab Province in 1911 with the Gurgaon district (northern Mewat) in the southwest.

=== British era ===
During the British Raj, the east and west of Mewat came under the Alwar State and the Bharatpur State. These kingdoms were princely states that were entities of the East India Company. Parts of northern Mewat (modern-day Palwal, Faridabad of Haryana) remained under the local Jat kings.

==== The Indian Rebellion of 1857 ====
During Indian Rebellion of 1857, Meos played an active role against the British. The rebellion mostly erupted due to the long resentment amongst the sepoys based on the introduction of new cartridge which was coated with the fat of pigs and cows. As the rebellion began in Meerut, the Meos threw themselves into the war with the British and the Khanzada Rajputs. The Khanzadas allying with the British as well as the historical class divide between the Meos and Khanzadas were the main reason as to why the Meos turned against them.

During the Siege of Delhi, the Meos enthroned Bahadur Shah Zafar as the emperor of India. Mufti Nizamuddin of Lahore and his Fatwa issued against the British forces which called upon the local population to support the forces of Rao Tula Ram also played a major role in the Meo uprising. Mufti Nizamuddin was later hanged in Tijara, Alwar.

The villages of Pinangwan, Mahu, Rupraka, Raisina, Ghasera, Ferozepur Jhrika and Nuh were key players in the revolt. The Meos sided with the Gurjars, Ahirs and other ethnic groups of the region and defeated William Ford, the Deputy Commissioner of Gurgaon. The British decided to withdraw and without a commonly accepted leader, the Meos ousted the British and formed their own government under the different chaudharies of the villages. Meos continued to fight the British for up to 2 months after Delhi was reconquered by the British.

After the British reconquered Gurgaon, many leaders of the rebellion were hanged to death, including Raja Nahar Singh of Ballabgarh. The prominent Meo leaders who were hanged to death include Sharfuddin Mewati, Saadat Khan Mewati and his family, Chaudhary Firoz Shah Mewati. Majlis Khan (who was close to Rao Tula Ram) and Sadruddin Meo were also lead players in the revolt.

After the rebellion was over, all of the Gurgaon district (modern-day Palwal, Faridabad, Nuh and Gurugram) passed to the direct control of British rule under the Punjab Province, whereas the other southern parts of the Mewat region remained with the kings of Alwar and Bharatpur.

==== Tablighi Jamaat ====
During the colonial era, religious syncretism was seen throughout the Muslim Meos of the region.

"The Meos (Muhammadans) of the eastern Punjab still participate in the observance of the Holi and Diwali festivals. On the latter occasion they paint the horns, hoofs, etc., of their bullocks and join in the general rejoicings".

— Excerpt from the Census of India (Punjab Province), 1911 AD

In the 1920s the grassroots Islamic movement Tablighi Jamaat arose from this region under Muhammad Ilyas Kandhlawi as a reformist movement. The Meos although Muslim, then had adopted Hindu traditions, attitudes and syncretism as Muslim political power declined long ago in the region, lacking the necessary acumen required to resist the cultural and religious influence of majority Hindus, prior to the arrival of Tablighi Jamaat. Tablighi Jamaat heavily influenced the culture in the region leading the Meos to mostly re-adopt traditionalist Sunni Islam under the Deobandi Hanafi school of thought. Muhammad Ilyas Kandhlawi was responsible for establishing the first Madrasah of Mewat in modern-day Nuh, Moin Ul Islam, which is still functional till this day.

==== The Alwar Movement and Yasin Khan ====
During the early 1930s, The rulers of the princely states of Alwar and Bharatpur imposed heavy taxes on the peasants, who were mostly Meos. The King of Alwar, Jai Singh Prabhakar also began to suppress the Meo peasantry and increased the land revenue and other taxes in his dominion, which directly affected the Meo population. The agriculturist farmers and peasants in the Alwarr region were the Meos who were already living under heavy taxation and miserable life. The enhanced tax was the great burden on Meo peasants and beyond their paying capacity so the Meo peasants showed their resentment and decided not to pay taxes and revenue until they were reduced.

Chaudhary Mohammad Yasin Khan led the Meos in their struggle. The rebellion was called the Alwar Movement. It was a big challenge for Raja Jai Singh and he attempted the movement. Having failed in his attempt to the control the Meos struggle, the Raja switched the entire movement into a communal movement.

The Muslims of Alwar were forced to abandon the city. They camped near Jama Masjid in Delhi and demanded central intervention by the British. Yasin Khan, called a conference at Ferozepur Jhirka, which was popularly known as the Alwar conference. Khan received the advice and assistance of national leaders, including Marxist leader Kunwar Mohammad Ashraf, Sayyed Mufti Faridabadi from the Indian National Congress, and the Majlis-e Ahrar-e Islam party volunteers.

The demands of the Meo people were sent to the British Government and were also published and distributed among the people including national leaders. Subsequently, in the area of Govindgarh, the army of Alwar State fired upon the Meos, killing hundreds of them and injuring many. The Meos began to demand to deploy the British army to save them from Maharaja's atrocities. In 1937, the British Government under the pressure of the Meos had to despose the Jai Singh Prabhakar to France in exile. He later died and was cremated in Alwar. The new Maharaja, Sawai Tej Singh Naruka, finally conceded the demands and reduced one-fourth of the land revenue that he was demanding in taxes. Illegal taxes and beggars were also declared unlawful.

The Alwar Movement greatly influenced the Bharatpur State as well. Raja Brijendra Singh of Bharatpur decided not to take any risks by disturbing the Meos. He sent Batra, the Dewan of Bharatpur, accompanied by Chaudhary Azmat Khan Chhiraklot and other Chaudharies, to Nuh so they could met Yasin Khan, where Batra assured him to give special attention to the improvement of the Meos.

This incident lead Yasin Khan to be accepted as "Chaudhriyon ka Chaudhary," (lit. 'the Social Head of Social Heads'), the absolute social leader of the Meo community.

=== Post-Indian Independence era ===
==== Communal tensions during the Partition of India ====
During Indian independence, there was a surge in communal tension when Jinnah demanded for the separate Muslim nation of Pakistan as a result of which Partition of India was proposed by the British rulers. As Meos professed Islam, a branch of the All India Muslim League was established in the area and a significant number of Meos became members of the organization.

During 1947, Communal riots broke out in Alwar, Bharatpur and the adjoining areas, thousands of Meo were displaced from Alwar and Bharatpur States. Many thousands were killed. They shifted to the Punjab Province and many went to Pakistan. Bacchu Singh, the prince of Bharatpur and son of Raja Brijendra Singh, played a main role in this act of ethnic cleansing. Although the Meos had previously had a good relationships with the Alwar and Bharatpur States, the communal tensions of the Partition and the British leaving India were significant factors for the violence. The Meos were unable to rely on British protection as they had in the past.

Earlier Kathumar, Nadbai, Kumher, Kherli, Bhusawar, Weir and till Mahwa was heavily populated with the Meo population. The population of Meos drastically decreased in Alwar and Bharatpur. An estimated 300,000 Meos including women and children were killed in riots that took place in the State of Bharatpur, Alwar and Jaipur and around four thousand mosques were destroyed. The violence of 1947 naturally altered the syncretic Hindu-Muslim lifestyle of people to a greater extent in the region. The violence, alongside the reformist movement of Tablighi Jamaat, lead the Meos to embrace a more Islamic identity in contrast to the Hindu nationalist ideology held by the kings, including Sawai Tej Singh Naruka.

During this period, around 800,000 Meos had decided to leave for Pakistan. On 19 December 1947, Mahatma Gandhi visited the village of Ghasera in the Punjab Province (present day Haryana) and requested Meos not to leave India. Yasin Khan was responsible for bringing Gandhi to Ghasera.

This is when Gandhi said his iconic quote:

"You are the backbone of India, India belongs to you and you belong to India."

— Mahatma Gandhi referring to the Meos, 1947, Ghasera

Mahatama Gandhi championed the resettlement of some Meos in Laxmangarh, Nagar, Kaman, Deeg of Alwar district and Bharatpur district. Ghasera celebrate "Mewat Day" on 19 December as a tribute to him. The joint effort of the Gandhian leaders and Yasin Khan had succeeded in checking the mass migration of thousands of the Meos. Many who had left India would return to Mewat in the proceeding months.

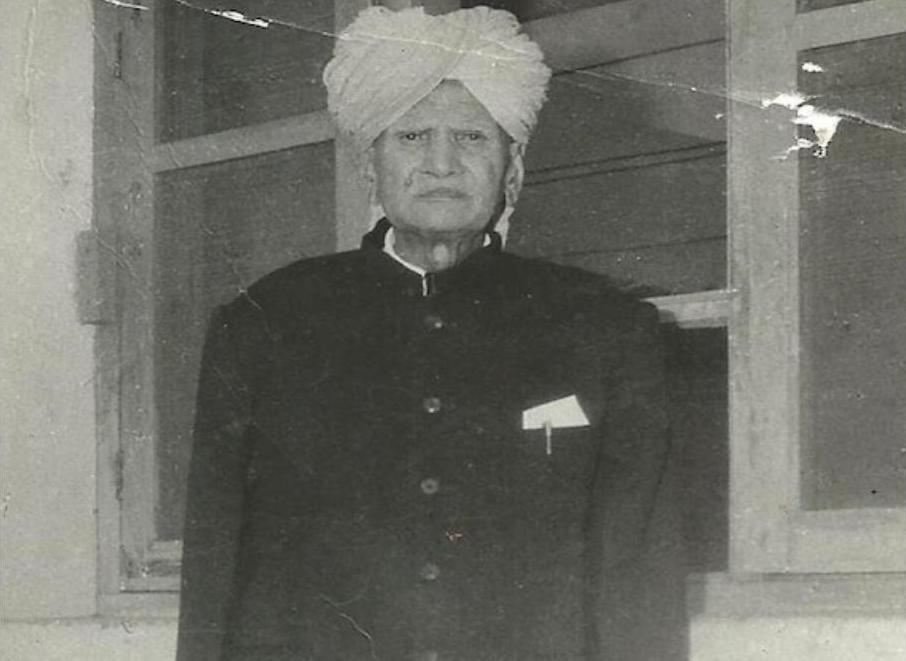
An image of Yasin Khan, taken in 1947.

==== Mewat's political dynasties ====
Yasin Khan cemented his political leadership and legacy in the region and was generally revered as a hero by the Meos. Although in recent times, he has become a controversial figure. Yasin Khan served as a Member of the Punjab Provincial Assembly and the Punjab Legislative Assembly for over 20 years. Yasin Khan's political leadership created three infamous political dynasties in the region, the Tayyab Husain clan, Rahim Khan clan and the Ahmed clan.

Khan guided his own son, Tayyab Husain during his life time. Husain later brought on Khurshid Ahmed, whereas Rahim Khan also emerged as political leader in rebellion to the two in the region. Rahim Khan became the individual to re-unite the ethnic Meos that were scattered across India with the All India Meo Sabha organization.

Tayyab Husain due to the region of Mewat spanning across different regions and states became the first and only person to date in Indian political history to serve as a cabinet minister for three separate state governments at three different times. The legacy of Tayyab Husain, Khurshid Ahmed and Rahim Khan continue to have significant influence in the politics and culture of the Mewat region to present-day.

==== Mewat district ====
In 1996, after the Punjab Reorganization Act, the northern area of Mewat came under the Gurgaon district of the newly established state of Haryana, which included the modern day districts of Gurgaon, Rewari, Faridabad and Nuh. On 4 April 2005, the Government of Haryana, officially established the Mewat district, named after the historical region. The district was created by taking parts of the previous Gurgaon district (Nuh, Ferozepur Jhirka, Punahana, Taoru) and Hathin from the previous Faridabad district of Haryana. However, in 2008, Hathin sub-division was reorganized into the new district of Palwal.

In 2016, the district was renamed from the Mewat district to the Nuh district to avoid confusion between the vast historical region and the district. The Nuh district, although was called Mewat, did not encompass the vast historical region, rather the district only a small part of it.

== Culture ==
The Hindu inhabitants of in the region of Mewat, although belonging to the same Kshatriya castes to which the Meos belonged before conversion to Islam, are not called Meo, which is the ethnic group originating from the region. Thus the word Meo is both region-specific and religion-specific. The Meo community in Mewat adheres to Islam, yet their ethnic framework finds its origins in the hierarchical structure of Hindu caste society. Cultural aspects are largely shared between the Meos and their Hindu counterparts in neighboring regions of Haryana and Rajasthan. Additionally, the neighboring Hindu Jats, Meenas, Ahirs and Muslim Rajputs also share the same cultural customs.

== Language ==
Mewati, an Indo-Aryan language is spoken in rural areas of the region. With approximately three million speakers, Mewati serves as a significant linguistic identifier within the Meo culture. While other ethnic groups in the area also use the Mewati language, it remains a distinctive feature integral to Meo heritage and identity. Ahirwati, a dialect of Mewati, is spoken in the Ahirwal region as well.

== See also ==
- Bagar region
- Dargah Hazrat Sheikh Musa
- Doab
- Grand Trunk Road
- Khadir and Bangar
- Mahendra Mewati
- Maniram
- Mewati cattle
- Nardak
