= Meo (ethnic group) =

Indigenous Muslim community of Mewat, India

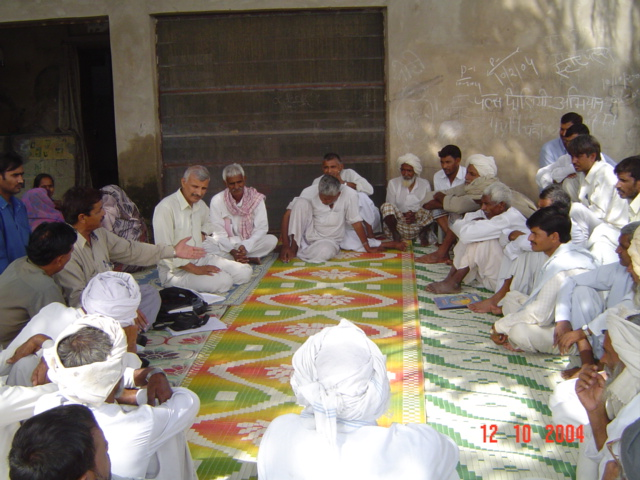
- Meo Panchayat members in Nuh district

Total population
- 1.8 - 2.8 million (2024-2025) India: Haryana districts: Nuh; Palwal; Faridabad; Ambala; Gurgaon; Rajasthan districts: Bharatpur; Alwar; Uttar Pradesh districts: Mathura; Meerut; Pakistan 1.1 million (2023 census) Punjab: Lahore; Sialkot; Kasur; Narowal; Sindh: Karachi; Larkana

Regions with significant populations
- Haryana, Rajasthan

Languages
- Mewati (native); Haryanvi, Kauravi, Rajasthani, Urdu, Hindi

Religion
- Islam

Meo (pronounced: mev or may-o) (also spelled Mayo or occasionally, Mewati) are a Muslim ethnic group originating from the Mewat region of north-western India.

== Terminology ==
The term "Meo" semantically correlates with the historical region of Mewat, which consists of the Nuh district of Haryana and some parts of adjoining Alwar and Bharatpur districts of Rajasthan and parts of western Uttar Pradesh. The term Mewati, in terms of use for ethnic classification, is also interchangeable with Meo. Although, not every Mewati is necessarily an ethnic Meo as the term is a general demonym for someone from Mewat.

== Oirigins and history ==
Meos consider themselves as a mainly Rajput caste. According to one theory of origin they were Hindu Rajputs who converted to Islam between the 11th and 17th centuries, until as late as Aurangzeb's rule.

The Meos embraced Islam primarily through the influence of the Sufi saint Ghazi Saiyyad Salar Masud, who was the nephew of Mahmud Ghaznavi. Over the centuries, various other Sufi saints also played significant roles in shaping the Islamic beliefs of the Meo community. Notable figures include Khwaja Moinuddin Chishti, Hazrat Nizamuddin Aulia, and Miran Sayyed Husain Khang Sawar. As a result of these influences, the Meos gradually became a prominent community in the Mewat region.

Over the centuries, they have maintained their age-old distinctive cultural identity. According to S. L. Sharma and R. N. Srivastava, Mughal persecution had little effect on the strengthening of their Islamic identity, but it reinforced their resistance to Mughal rule.

Though the general claim of Kshatriya Rajput descent may be true, some of them may be descendants of other castes who might have laid claim to this ancestry after converting to Islam to enhance their social standing. The names of many gots (gotra) or exogamous lineages of Meos are common with other Hindu castes as Meena, Ahir and Gujjar who live in their vicinity. While the kinship structure is closer to Jat system prevalent in Punjab and Rajasthan. It thus seems possible that the Meos belonged to many different castes and not just to the Rajputs; this phenomenon is also seen in other Rajput communities and is not limited to the Meos.

== Cultural connections ==
Meos speak Mewati, a language of the Indo-Aryan language family, although in some areas the language dominance of Urdu and Hindi has seen Meos adopt these languages instead.

The Hindu inhabitants of Mewat, although belonging to the same Kshatriya castes to which the Meos belonged before conversion to Islam, are not called Meo. Thus the word Meo is both region-specific and religion-specific. According to many, Meos come from many Hindu clans who converted to Islam and amalgamated as the Meo community, however there is no solid basis for this claim.

Meos profess Islam but the roots of their ethnic structure are in Hindu caste society. Meos share most of their culture with their Hindu counterparts from neighbouring areas in Haryana and Rajasthan.

Like Hindus of the north, the Meo do not marry within their own gotras although Islam permits marriage with cousins. Solemnization of marriage among Meos was not complete without both nikah and saptapadi, although the latter has been mostly abandoned with the advent of Islam. Some gotras of the Meos believe that they are direct descendants of Krishna and Rama.

== Clans (Gotras) ==
Meos were divided into three groups (vansh), thirteen pals and fifty-two clans (gotras) by Rana Kaku Balot Meo in the 13th century. Meos have twelve pals including a thirteenth inferior pal.

=== Pals and Clans (Gotras) ===
==== List of Pals ====
- Ratwat
- Dedwal
- Lundawat
- Balot
- Nai
- Poonglot
- Dulot
- Chhirkalot
- Demrot
- Kalisa
- Sengal
- Dhengal
- Pahat (thirteenth inferior pal)

Table of Gotras
Agnivanshi		Chandravanshi		Surajvanshi (5 total)
Pawar (3 total)	Chauhan (10 total)	Tomar (18 total)	Jado (16 total)	Surajvanshi (5 total)
Khokkar	Chaurasia	Kangar (Kanga)	Nai (Bhamdawat)	Dehangal
Malik	Jamaliya	Tanwar (Mangaria-Surohiya)	Chhokar	Sengal (Badgujar)
Pawar (Mewal)		Bilyana	Bhati	Kalisa (Pahat)
	Chauhan	Ratawat	Veer	Godh
	Kalsia	Sukeda	Bhabla	Gomal
	Kanwaliya (Kamaaliya)	Gehlot	Jhangala	
	Mark (Mandar)	Karkatiya	Silania	
	Pahat	Lamkhara	Kholdar (Untwaal)	
	Sapolia	Nanglot	Sodola	
	Saugun	Matyavat	Dulot	
		Sagadawat	Chhirkalot	
		Jatlawat	Bhegot	
		Balot (Bugla)	Naharwad	
		Kataria	Demrot (Boridha)	
		Bodhiyan	Poonglot (Sekhawat)	
		Ludawat or Baghodia	Gorwal	
		Majilawat-Jhelawat-Kadawat, Dhatawat-Lalawat		

=== Marriage and kinship customs ===
Meos generally do not follow the Muslim law of inheritance and so among them, like various other communities in the region, custom makes a younger cousin marry the widow of the deceased by a simple Nikah ceremony.

== Geography and demography ==
=== Post-independence change ===
Despite pressure to do so from the regional princely states of Alwar and Bharatpur, ruled by Hindu princes, the Meo Rajput community decided not to migrate to Pakistan during the Partition of India. During 1947, Meo were displaced from Alwar and Bharatpur States and there was significant loss of life in intercommunal violence. The population of Meos drastically decreased in Alwar and Bharatpur. However, many old mosques from pre-independence era are still present there.

In 1947, Mahatma Gandhi visited Ghasera, a village in present-day Nuh district to urge the Muslims living there not to leave, calling the Meos "Iss desh ki reed ki haddi" or 'the backbone of the country', India. Due to this, the people of Ghasera still celebrate Mewat Day.

Although on the whole the community did not migrate, there were a number of gotras of the Meos who, on an individual basis, did decide to relocate to Pakistan during partition. They were mostly settled in Pakistani districts of Sialkot, Lahore, Karachi, Narowal, Dera Ghazi Khan, Sheikhupura, Gujranwala, Multan, Haiderabad and Kasur, among others.

According to the 2023 Pakistani census, there are around 1.1 million Mewati speakers in Pakistan, virtually all of them in Punjab. While the estimated population of Meos is over 2 million.

== Legacy ==
Resisting Regimes is the first political anthropological and social-historical study detailing the Meos.

== Bibliography ==
- Bhardwaj, Suraj Bhan (2019). State and Peasant Society in Medieval North India: Essays on Changing Contours of Mewat. Primus Books. ISBN 978-93-86552-23-5.
- Chawla, Abhay (February 2023). Meos of Mewat in the 21st Century: Marginalization, Mobiles and New Media.
- Jamous, Raymond (2003). Kinship and rituals among the Meo of Northern India: Locating sibling relationship. Translated by Scott, Nora. Translated to English from the French. New Delhi: Oxford University Press. ISBN 0-19-566459-0.
- Weekes, Richard V. (1984). Muslim Peoples: Maba. Greenwood Press. pp. 515–21. ISBN 978-0-313-24640-1.
- Maheshwari, Belu (March 2003). "The Meos of Mewat: Perspectives on ethnicity and nation building". Social Change. 33 (1): 81–91. doi:10.1177/004908570303300105.
- Samiuddin, Abida; Khanam, R. Global Encyclopaedic Ethnography of Indian Muslim. Global Vision Publishing House. pp. 504–508. ISBN 978-81-8220-299-3.
- Tosif Ul Hasan mewati (22 February 2020). Payam E Mewat Sep 20 1 (in Urdu).
- Asghar, Muhammad; Awan, Dr. Maqbool Ahmad (30 September 2025). "The Historical Evolution of Mewati Muslim community in India and Pakistan". Inverge Journal of Social Sciences. 4 (3): 413–423. doi:10.63544/ijss.v4i3.218. ISSN 2959-4359.
