= Mewati language =

Indo-Aryan language of India

Mewati
- मेवाती میواتی
- Native to: India
- Region: Mewat region
- Ethnicity: Mewati
- Native speakers: 860,000 (2011 census); Census results conflate most speakers with Hindi
- Language family: Indo-European: Indo-Iranian; Indo-Aryan; Western Indo-Aryan; Rajasthani; Mewati
- Writing system: Devanagari, Perso-Arabic

Language codes
- ISO 639-3: wtm
- Glottolog: mewa1250

Mewati (Devanagri: मेवाती; Perso-Arabic: میواتی, IPA: [meːʋaːt̪iː]) is a language spoken in the Mewat region of northern India. It belongs to the Rajasthani languages in the Indo-Aryan language family.

It has the most number of speakers, 3 million, in Nuh district of Haryana predominantly by the Meo people and is also spoken in parts of Haryana's Palwal and Rajasthan's Khairthal-Tijara and Deeg districts. While other people in the region also speak the Mewati language, it is one of the defining characteristics of Meo culture.

According to the 2023 Pakistani census, there are also around 1.1 million Mewati speakers in Pakistan.

There are 9 vowels, 31 consonants, and two diphthongs. Suprasegmentals are less prominent than they are in the other. There are two numbers; singular and plural. Two genders; masculine and feminine, and three cases; direct, oblique, and vocative. The nouns decline according to their final segments. Case marking is postpositional. Pronouns are traditional in nature and are inflected for number and case. Gender is not distinguished in pronouns. There are two types of adjectives. There are three tenses; past, present, and future. Participles function as adjectives.

== Phonology ==
There are twenty plosives at five places of articulation, each being tenuis, aspirated, voiced, and murmured: /p t ʈ tʃ k, pʰ tʰ ʈʰ tʃʰ kʰ, b d ɖ dʒ ɡ, bʱ dʱ ɖʱ dʒʱ ɡʱ/. Nasals and laterals may also be murmured, and there is a voiceless /h/ and a murmured /ɦ/.
