= Khanzada Rajputs =

Community of Muslim Rajputs

The Khanzada Rajputs are a cluster of Muslim Rajput communities from the Indian states of Uttar Pradesh and Rajasthan. After the partition of British India in 1947, many members of the community migrated to Pakistan, becoming a part of the broader Muhajir community.

== Etymology ==
The term Khanzada or Khan zadeh (from Turkic Khan and Persian -zada) is a Turko-Persian translation of the Hindi word Rajput, which originates from the Sanskrit word rājaputra (Sanskrit: राजपुत्र; literally "son of a king"). The Sankrit term finds mention in some ancient Hindu scriptures like the Rigveda, Ramayana and Mahabharata.

== History and origin ==
The term khanzada originally applied to the Bachgoti Rajput family of the Rajahs of Hasanpur. They were believed to have converted to Islam during the rule of Sher Shah Suri. This family claimed descent from Bariar Singh, a Bachgoti Rajput, who reportedly emigrated from Sultanpur in the 13th century. The Bachgoti started off as a clan of the Chauhan Rajputs of Mainpuri. Bariar Singh's grandson, Tilok Chand is said to have converted to Islam, and the family took the name Khanzada. Another notable community are the Khanzadas of Mewat, the descendants of Nahar Khan, who are a sub-clan of the Jadaun clan of Rajputs.

== Present circumstances ==
In northern Awadh, a region comprising roughly Barabanki District in south east to Lakhimpur Kheri District in the north west, the Khanzada have a followed a slightly different path, with a stronger identification with Islam. In a recent study of a Chauhan Khanzada village in Raisenghat Tehsil of Barabanki District, the community appears to be strongly identifying with neighbouring Muslim Rajputs of Uttar Pradesh, and there were cases of increasingly intermarriage between the two groups. There economic condition in this region is also been affected, with a dwindling in the size of their farms, especially in Shravasti and Balrampur districts. The Khanzada, however have been badly affected by abolition of the zamindari system, with many now destitute. They still remain a land owning community, but those especially in Balrampur, Gonda and Bahraich are now simply agricultural labourers. The community are also divided on sectarian lines, with the majority being Sunni, while a minority, mainly the ex-taluqdar families being Shia. Like other Indian Muslims, there is growing movement towards orthodoxy, with many of their villages containing madrasas. The madrasas have also facilitated the growth of Urdu, with it beginning to replace the Awadhi dialect they traditionally spoke.

== See also ==
- Khokhar Khanzada
