= Mundawar Assembly constituency =

Legislative Assembly constituency in Rajasthan State, India

Coordinates: 27.86°N 76.55°E

Mundawar
- Constituency No. 61 for the Rajasthan Legislative Assembly

Constituency details
- Country: India
- Region: North India
- State: Rajasthan
- District: Alwar
- Lok Sabha constituency: Alwar
- Established: 1951
- Total electors: 241,615
- Reservation: None

Member of Legislative Assembly
- 16th Rajasthan Legislative Assembly
- Incumbent Lalit Yadav
- Party: Indian National Congress
- Elected year: 2023

Mundawar Assembly constituency is one of the 200 Legislative Assembly constituencies of Rajasthan state in India.

It is part of Alwar district.

== Members of the Legislative Assembly ==
Year	Member	Party
1951	Ghasi Ram Yadav	Indian National Congress
1962	Hari Prasad	Indian National Congress
1967	Hari Prasad	Indian National Congress
1972	Ram Singh	Indian National Congress
1977	Hira Lal	Janata Party
1980	Ghasi Ram Yadav	Indian National Congress
1985	Mahendra Shastri	Lokdal
1990	Ghasi Ram Yadav	Indian National Congress
1993	Ghasi Ram Yadav	Indian National Congress
1998	Jaswant Singh Yadav	Bharatiya Janata Party
2000★	Dharam Pal Choudhary	Bharatiya Janata Party
2003	Dharam Pal Choudhary	Bharatiya Janata Party
2008	Major O. P. Yadav	Indian National Congress
2013	Dharam Pal Choudhary	Bharatiya Janata Party
2018	Manjeet Dharampal Choudhary	Bharatiya Janata Party
2023	Lalit Yadav	Indian National Congress

★By election

== Election results ==
=== 2023 ===
2023 Rajasthan Legislative Assembly election: Mundawar
Party	Candidate	Votes	%	±%
INC	Lalit Yadav	105,735	57.83	
BJP	Manjeet Dharampal Choudhary	70,111	38.35	−7.13
ASP(KR)	Anjali Yadav	2,986	1.63	
NOTA	None of the above	744	0.41	+0.16
Majority		35,624	19.48	+8.54
Turnout		182,838	75.67	+1.96
INC gain from BJP		Swing		

=== 2018 ===
2018 Rajasthan Legislative Assembly election2018: Mundawar
Party	Candidate	Votes	%	±%
BJP	Manjeet Dharampal Choudhary	73,191	45.48	
BSP	Lalit Yadav	55,589	34.54	
Loktantrik Janta Dal	Bharat Yadav	21,852	13.58	
Independent	Rohitash	1,608	1.0	
NOTA	None of the above	400	0.25	
Majority		17,602	10.94	
Turnout		160,918	73.71	

== See also ==
- List of constituencies of the Rajasthan Legislative Assembly
- Alwar district
