= Behror Assembly constituency =

Legislative Assembly constituency in Rajasthan State, India

Coordinates: 27.89°N 76.29°E

Behror
- Constituency No. 62 for the Rajasthan Legislative Assembly

Constituency details
- Country: India
- Region: North India
- State: Rajasthan
- District: Kotputli-Behror
- Lok Sabha constituency: Alwar
- Established: 1951
- Total electors: 237,305
- Reservation: None

Member of Legislative Assembly
- 16th Rajasthan Legislative Assembly
- Incumbent Vacant

Behror Assembly constituency is one of the 200 Legislative Assembly constituencies of Rajasthan state in India.

It is part of Kot-Behror district and Alwar Lok Sabha Constituency.

== Members of the Legislative Assembly ==
Year	Member	Picture	Party
1951	Ramji Lal Yadav		Indian National Congress
1957	Chander Singh		Independent
1962	Ghasi Ram Yadav		Indian National Congress
1967	A. Lal		Samyukta Socialist Party
1972	Ghasi Ram Yadav		Indian National Congress
1977	Bhawani Singh		Janata Party
1980	Rao Sujan Singh		Indian National Congress
1985	Rao Sujan Singh		Indian National Congress
1990	Mahi Pal Yadav		Janata Dal
1993	Rao Sujan Singh		Independent
1998	Rao Karan Singh		Indian National Congress
2003	Rao Karan Singh		Indian National Congress
2004 (By poll)	Mahant Chandnath		Bharatiya Janata Party
2008	Rao Jaswant Singh		Bharatiya Janata Party
2013	Rao Jaswant Singh		Bharatiya Janata Party
2018	Baljeet Yadav		Independent
2023	Rao Jaswant Singh		Bharatiya Janata Party

== Election results ==
=== 2023 ===
2023 Rajasthan Legislative Assembly election: Behror
Party	Candidate	Votes	%	±%
BJP	Jaswant Singh Yadav	70,400	40.03	+16.57
RJS (Note: Rashtriya Janata Sena)	Baljeet Yadav	53,177	30.24	
INC	Sanjay Yadav	46,668	26.54	−5.35
AAP	Hardan Singh Gurjar	2,612	1.49	
NOTA	None of the above	1,091	0.62	−0.15
Majority		17,223	9.79	+7.41
Turnout		175,866	74.11	−0.29
BJP gain from Independent		Swing		

=== 2018 ===
Rajasthan Legislative Assembly Election, 2018: Behror
Party	Candidate	Votes	%	±%
IND	Baljeet Yadav	55,160	34.27	
INC	Ramchandra Yadav	51,324	31.89	
BJP	Mohit Yadav	37,755	23.46	
BSP	Jasram	12,433	7.73	
NOTA	None of the above	1,246	0.77	
Majority		3,836	2.38	
Turnout		160,937	74.4	

== See also ==
- List of constituencies of the Rajasthan Legislative Assembly
- Alwar district
