= Alwar Lok Sabha constituency =

Lok Sabha constituency in Rajasthan

Coordinates: 27.56°N 76.62°E

Alwar
- Lok Sabha constituency
- Interactive Map Outlining Alwar Lok Sabha Constituency

Constituency details
- Country: India
- Region: North India
- State: Rajasthan
- Assembly constituencies: Tijara; Kishangarh Bas; Mundawar; Behror; Alwar Rural; Alwar Urban; Ramgarh; Rajgarh Laxmangarh
- Established: 1952
- Reservation: None

Member of Parliament
- 18th Lok Sabha
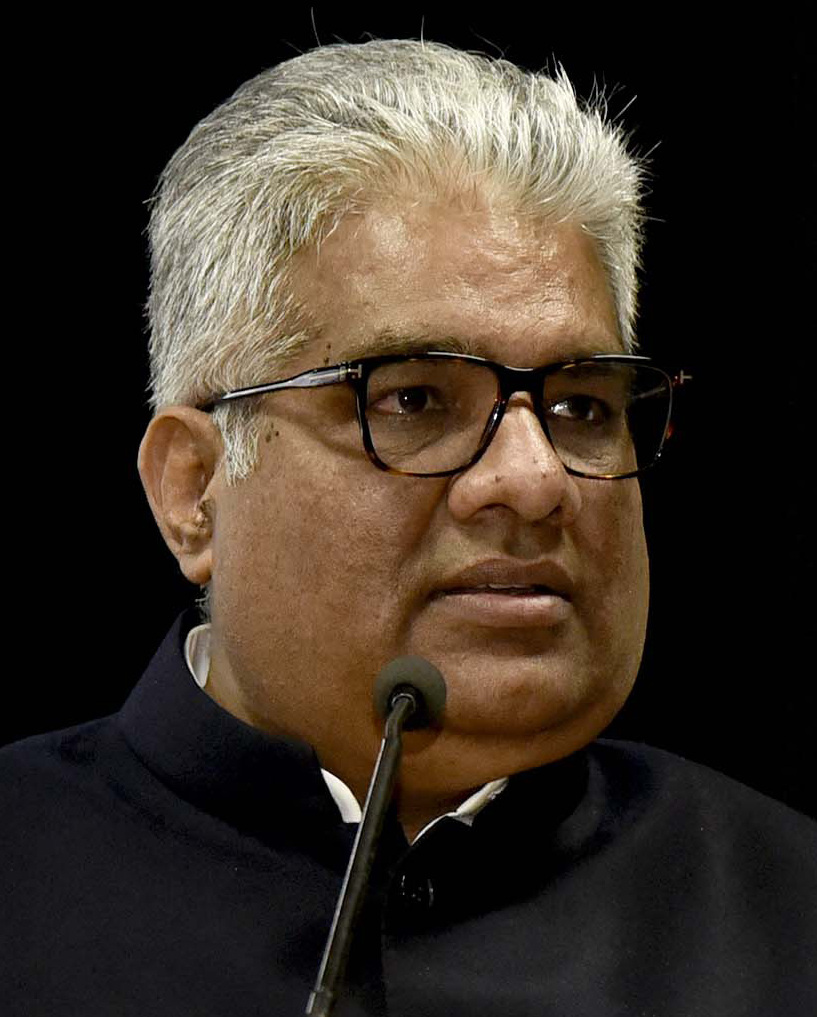
- Incumbent Bhupender Yadav; Union Minister of the Environment, Forest, and Climate Change
- Party: Bhartiya Janta Party
- Elected year: 2024

Alwar Lok Sabha constituency (Hindi pronunciation: [əlʋəɾ]) is one of the 25 Lok Sabha (parliamentary) constituencies in Rajasthan state in India.

== Assembly segments ==
Presently, Alwar Lok Sabha constituency comprises eight Vidhan Sabha (legislative assembly) segments. These are:

#	Name	District	Member	Party	2024 Lead
59	Tijara	Khairthal-Tijara	Mahant Balaknath	BJP	BJP
60	Kishangarh Bas	Khairthal-Tijara	Deepchand Khairiya	INC	BJP
61	Mundawar	Khairthal-Tijara	Lalit Yadav	INC	BJP
62	Behror	Kot-Behror	Jaswant Singh Yadav	BJP	BJP
65	Alwar Rural (SC)	Alwar	Tika Ram Jully	INC	INC
66	Alwar Urban	Alwar	Sanjay Sharma	BJP	BJP
67	Ramgarh	Alwar	Sukhavant Singh	BJP	INC
68	Rajgarh Laxmangarh (ST)	Alwar	Mangelal Meena	INC	INC

== Members of Parliament ==
Year	Member	Party
1952	Shobha Ram Kumawat	Indian National Congress
1957	Shobha Ram Kumawat	Indian National Congress
1962	Kashi Ram Gupta	Independent
1967	Bholanath Master	Indian National Congress
1971	Hari Prasad Sharma	Indian National Congress
1977	Ramji Lal Yadav	Janata Party
1980	Ram Singh Yadav	Indian National Congress
1984	Ram Singh Yadav	Indian National Congress
1989	Ramji Lal Yadav	Janata Dal
1991	Mahendra Kumari	Bharatiya Janata Party
1996	Nawal Kishore Sharma	Indian National Congress
1998	Ghasi Ram Yadav	Indian National Congress
1999	Jaswant Singh Yadav	Bharatiya Janata Party
2004	Karan Singh Yadav	Indian National Congress
2009	Jitendra Singh	Indian National Congress
2014	Mahant Chandnath	Bharatiya Janata Party
2018^	Karan Singh Yadav	Indian National Congress
2019	Mahant Balaknath	Bharatiya Janata Party
2024	Bhupender Yadav	Bharatiya Janata Party

^By-Poll

== Election results ==
Vote share of winning candidates
2024	50.42%
2019	60.06%
2018^	57.43%
2014	60.42%
2004	45.47%

=== 2024 ===
2024 Indian general election: Alwar
Party	Candidate	Votes	%	±%
BJP	Bhupender Yadav	631,992	50.42	
INC	Lalit Yadav	583,710	46.57	
BSP	Fazal Hussain	19,287	1.54	
NOTA	None of the Above	5,822	0.46	
Majority		48,282	3.85	
Turnout		1,253,438	60.07	▼7.10
BJP hold		Swing		

=== 2019 ===
2019 Indian general elections: Alwar
Party	Candidate	Votes	%	±%
BJP	Mahant Balaknath	760,201	60.06	▲19.99
INC	Bhanwar Jitendra Singh	4,30,230	33.99	▼23.44
BSP	Imran Khan	56,649	4.48	
NOTA	None of the Above	5,385	0.43	▼0.92
Majority		3,29,971	26.07	▲8.71
Turnout		12,68,477	67.17	
BJP gain from INC		Swing		

=== 2018 by-election ===
2018 by-election: Alwar
Party	Candidate	Votes	%	±%
INC	Karan Singh Yadav	642,416	57.43	+23.72
BJP	Jaswant Singh Yadav	4,45,920	40.07	−20.35
NOTA	None of the Above	15,093	1.36	+1.12
Majority		1,96,496	17.36	
Turnout		11,27,854	61.70	
INC gain from BJP		Swing		

=== 2014 ===
2014 Indian general elections: Alwar
Party	Candidate	Votes	%	±%
BJP	Mahant Chand Nath	642,278	60.42	
INC	Bhanwar Jitendra Singh	3,58,383	33.71	
BSP	Azad Husain	19,483	1.83	
AAP	Dr. Virendra Vidrohi	8,517	0.80	
IND.	Hari Singh Sharma	3,672	0.35	
NOTA	None of the Above	2,512	0.24	
Majority		2,83,895	26.71	
Turnout		10,62,305	65.31	
BJP gain from INC		Swing		

=== 2004 ===
2004 Indian general elections: Alwar
Party	Candidate	Votes	%	±%
INC	Dr. Karan Singh Yadav	246,833	45.47	+1.94
BJP	Mahant Chand Nath	2,38,462	43.93	−9.02
BSP	Bhai Shree Nath Gurjar	21,247	3.91	+1.48
IND	R D Sharma	16,627	3.06	
INLD	Chandrabhan	5,833	1.07	
IND	Subhash	5,190	0.96	
Majority		8,371	1.54	
Turnout			58.05	
INC gain from BJP		Swing	+1.94	

== See also ==
- Alwar district
- List of constituencies of the Lok Sabha
