= Chandra Pal =

Law Professor, Academic

Professor C.P. Sheoran
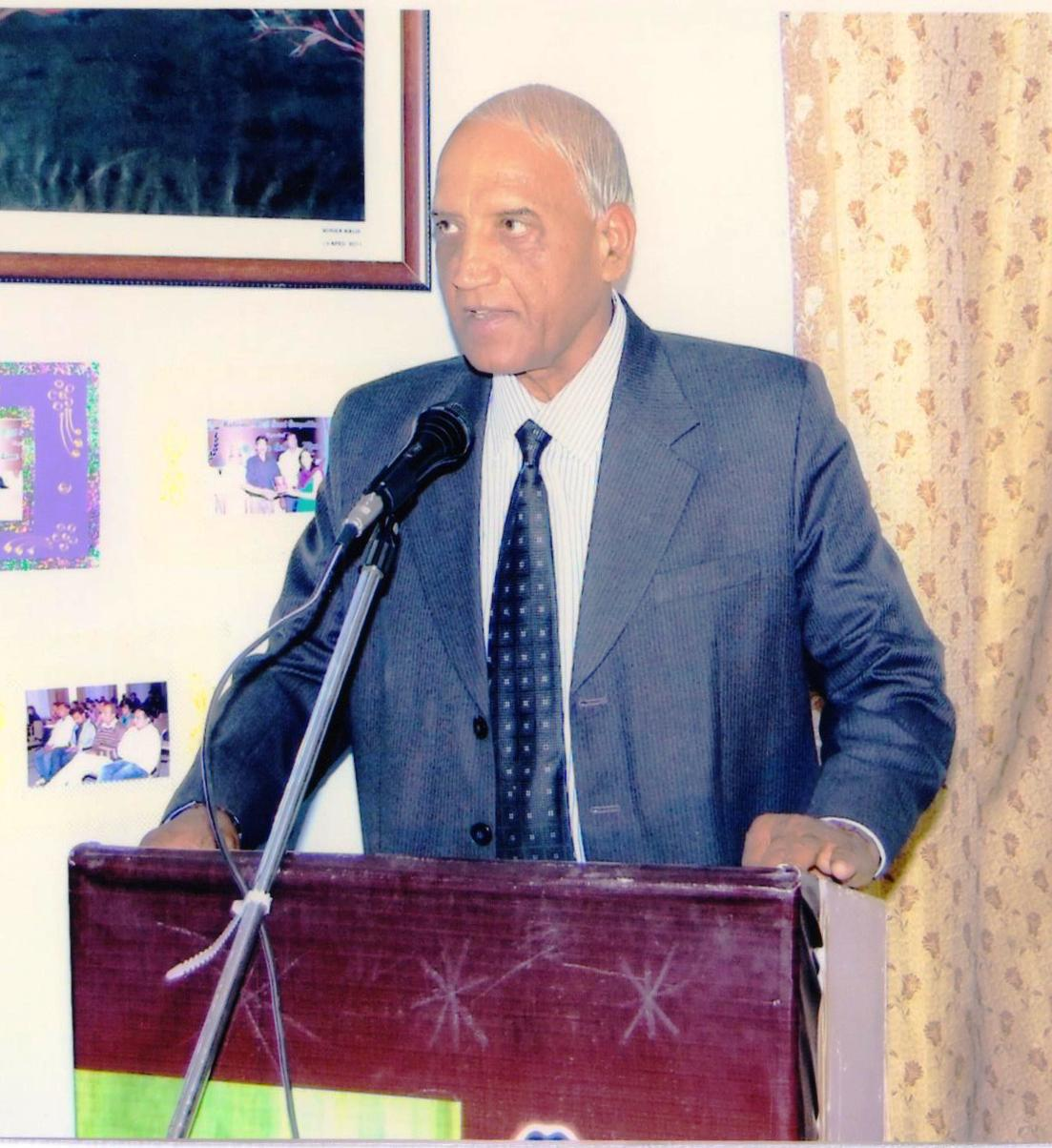
- Professor C.P. Sheoran expert of constitution Law

Personal details
- Born: Chandra; 2 June 1950 (age 76) Badhra
- Spouse: Sunil Sheoran
- Children: Two
- Education: Kurukshetra University
- Occupation: Professor
- Profession: Teaching, Administration

Chandra Pal (born 1950) is an Indian legal education administrator, jurist presently working in Baba Mast Nath University as professor. He has previously worked as Head and Dean of the Law Department, Maharishi Dayanand University, Rohtak, India. He has been distinguished invitees, Chief Guest, Guest of honor in various universities. The Prof. C.P. Sheoran, has published three books and 140 research papers and book reviews. He has guided many Ph.D.'s. He has participated and organised many seminars and conferences. He is alumni of Kurukshetra University. He was awarded Ph.D. in 1980 PG (LL.M.) in 1974, UG(LL.B.) in 1972 and (B.Sc.) in 1969 Kurukshetra University, Rohtak.

== Career ==
He was Director of Distance Education, MDU, Rohtak in 2005. In 1993 has worked as Registrar of M.D. University, Rohtak. During 1993–1996 Dean, Faculty of Education, M.D. University, Rohtak. Proctor and Dean, Law Faculty, M.D. University Rohtak during (1995–1998, 2001–2004), Head, Law Department, M.D. University, Rohtak (1994–1997, 2002–2005, 2007–2010). He was member of various academic bodies including Member, Executive Council Mizoram Central University, Aizawal.

== Books ==
- Pal, Chandra (1983). Centre-state relations and cooperative federalism. New Delhi: Deep & Deep. OCLC 11141855.
- Pal, Chandra (1984). State Autonomy in Indian Federation: Emerging Trends. Deep & Deep Publications.
- Pal, Chandra. (1999). Environmental pollution and development : environmental law, policy, and role of judiciary ([1st ed.] ed.). New Delhi: Mittal Publications. ISBN 81-7099-727-5. OCLC 43655602.
- Human Rights in 21st Century : National And International Perspectives.
- Fiscal Federalism and Union State Fiscal Relations: Current Issues and Trends.
