= Baba Mastnath =

Saint from Haryana, India

Baba Mastnath (born 1764) was a Hindu saint. He was born in bohr village in Rohtak district in the Indian state of Haryana. His father named Sabla belongs to Rebari Hindu community. He is a reincarnation of Guru Gorakhnath. He moved to Math Asthal Bohar (established by Guru Chauranginath in the 8th century). He rejuvenated it and resurrected the Math. In 2012 his seventh disciple Mahant Chandnath established Baba Mastnath University in his name. Maharaja was present in his five-physical elements for a hundred years. In his time, the monarchy of Delhi was weakening as a result of the religious fanaticism of Aurangzeb, the independence of the Subedars, the destruction of the foreign invasions and the conspiracy to take away the traditional political power of the European companies. The provinces of Punjab, Haryana etc. were getting dilapidated. Guru Chauranginath meditated by enlightening continuous fire is known as Dhuna for twelve years.

== Annual fair ==
Baba Mastnath Mela is celebrated in the memory of Baba Mastnath and is held on Phalguna Sudi 7 (February–March), On 7th, 8th & 9th of Shukla Paksha (Lunar) Phalguna (फाल्गुन मास के शुक्ल पक्ष की सप्तमी से नवमी) (11th solar month, 12th Hindu month, Feb-March) Annual fair is celebrated every year. People worship at the samadhi of the saint at Bohar (Rohtak tehsil). This fair is held at Khera Sadh (Rohtak Tahsil) where people worship both in the temple and at the samadh.

== Literary work on Baba Mast Nath ==
- Books
  - A Glossary of the Tribes and Castes of the Punjab and North-West Frontier Province: A.-K. Atlantic Publishers & Dist. 1997. ISBN 978-81-85297-69-9.
  - Department, Haryana (India) Public Relations (1971). Haryana District Handbooks.
  - Haryana District Gazetteers: Delhi district gazetteer, 1912. Gazetteers Organisation, Revenue Department, Haryana. 1998.
- Gazetteer
  - Page 42 Section People of Rohtak District Gazetteer – 1970.
  - Page 325 Section-Places of interest, Asthal Bohar (Tahsil Rohtak) of Rohtak District Gazetteer – 1970.
  - Page 64 Section-Mahants of Baba Mast Nath of Haryana District Gazetteers of 1910.

== See also ==
- Mahant Totanath (first Mahant)
- Mahant Meghnath (Second Mahant)
- Mahant Moharnath (Third Mahant)
- Mahant Chetnath (Fourth Mahant)
- Mahant Purannath (Fifth Mahant)
- Mahant Shreyonath (Sixth Mahant 1939–1978)
- Mahant Chandnath (Seventh Mahant 1978-2016)
- Mahant Balaknath (Eighth Mahant 2016–present)
