= Baljeet Yadav =

Indian politician

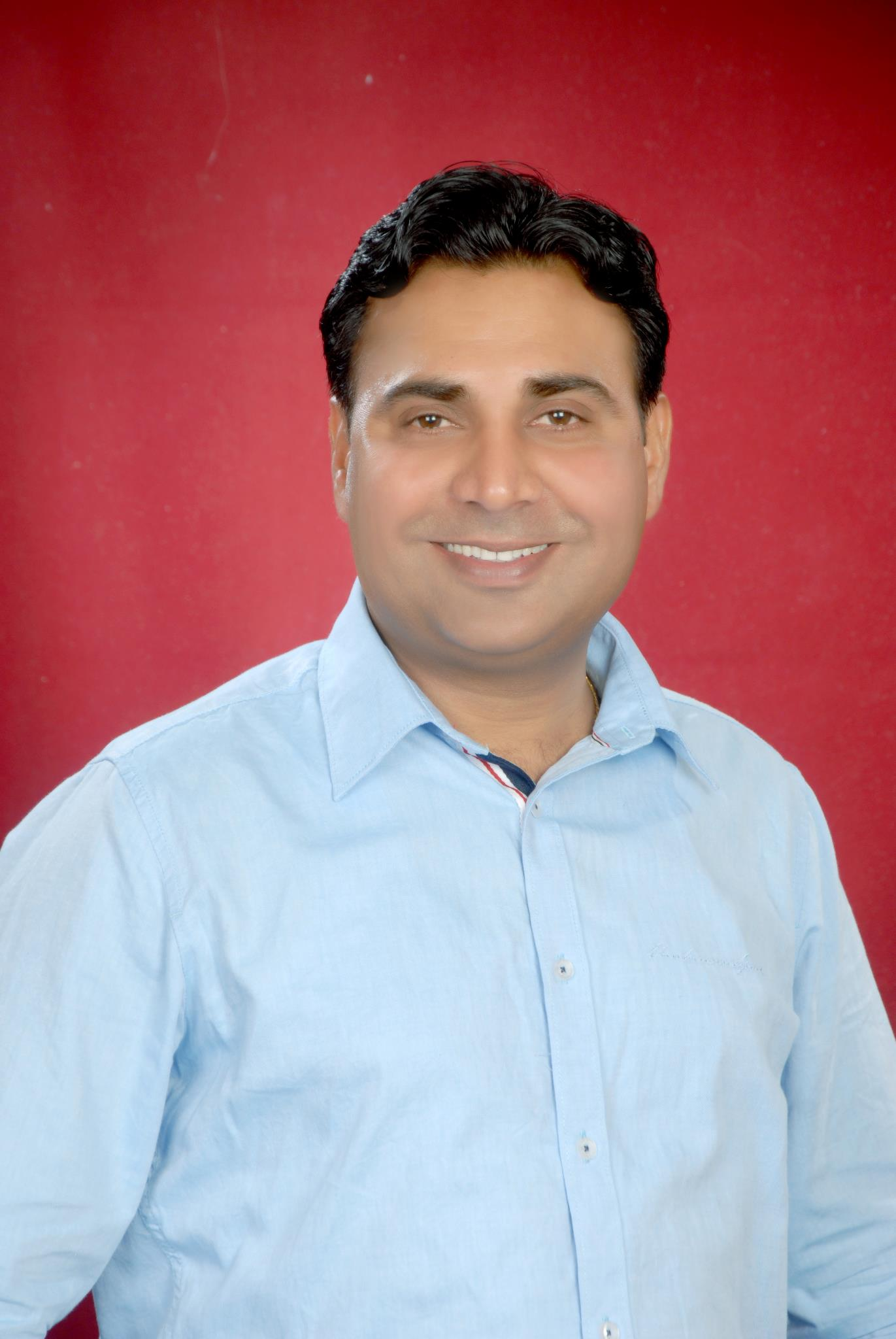

Member of the Rajasthan Legislative Assembly
- In office December 2018 – December 2023
- Preceded by: Jaswant Singh Yadav
- Succeeded by: Jaswant Singh Yadav
- Constituency: Behror

Personal details
- Born: 15 June 1978 (age 48) Bantkhani, Alwar
- Education: Rajasthan University

Baljeet Yadav is an Indian politician. He was elected to the 15th Rajasthan Assembly from Behror.
