= Lalit Yadav (politician) =

Indian politician

Member of Rajasthan Legislative Assembly
- Incumbent
- Assumed office 3 December 2023
- Preceded by: Manjeet Dharampal Choudhary, BJP
- Constituency: Mundawar

Personal details
- Political party: Indian National Congress
- Occupation: Farmer, Politician

Lalit Yadav is an Indian politician. He was born in a village near Neemrana (Fouladpur). He was elected as MLA of Mundawar Vidhansabha - Alwar district, Rajasthan as an Indian National Congress politician and member of the Rajasthan Legislative Assembly, elected in 2023 from Mundawar.

Being a first-time state legislator, he was nominated by his party to contest the 2024 Indian general election from Alwar. He was also being elected and won the election in university for president of Rajasthan University (Jaipur). INC party sources described this as being an effort to promote new leadership in the Vidhansabha.
