= Tijara Assembly constituency =

Legislative Assembly constituency in Rajasthan State, India

Coordinates: 27.93°N 76.85°E

Tijara
- Constituency No. 59 for the Rajasthan Legislative Assembly

Constituency details
- Country: India
- Region: North India
- State: Rajasthan
- District: Khairthal-Tijara district
- Lok Sabha constituency: Alwar
- Established: 1951
- Total electors: 262,727
- Reservation: None

Member of Legislative Assembly
- 16th Rajasthan Legislative Assembly
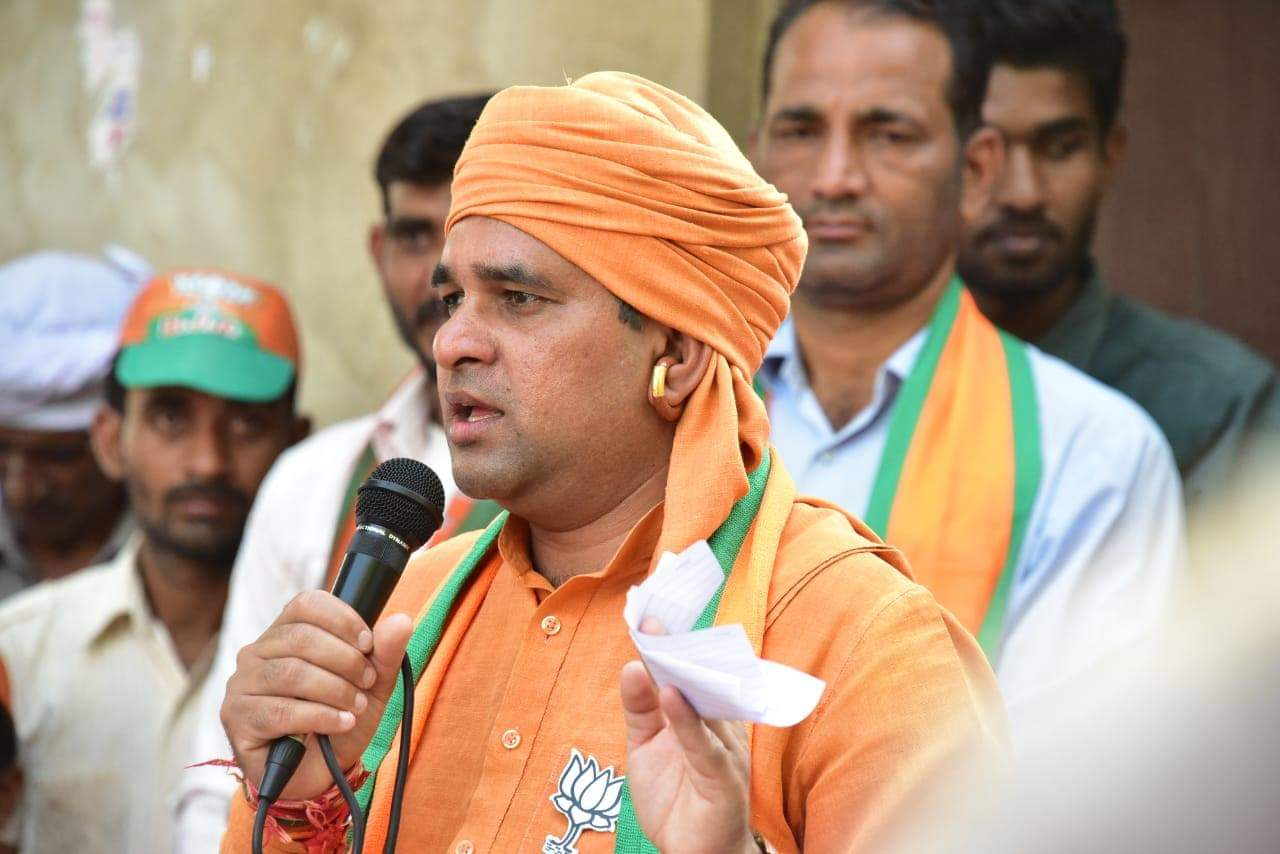
- Incumbent Yogi Balaknath
- Party: BJP
- Elected year: 2023

Tijara Assembly constituency is one of the 200 Legislative Assembly constituencies of Rajasthan state in India.

== Members of the Legislative Assembly ==
Year	Member	Picture	Party		
1951	Ghasi Ram Yadav			Indian National Congress	
1957	Ghasi Ram Yadav			Indian National Congress	
1957 (Note: by-election)	Sampat Ram			Indian National Congress	
1962	Hari Ram			Communist Party of India	
1967	Amimddin			Indian National Congress	
1972	Barkatullah Khan			Indian National Congress	
1977	Ayub			Janata Party	
1980	Deen Mohammad			Indian National Congress	
1985	Jagmal Singh Yadav			Lokdal	
1990	Jagmal Singh Yadav			Janata Dal	
1993	Aimaduddin Ahmad Khan			Indian National Congress	
1998	Jagmal Singh Yadav			Rashtriya Janata Dal	
2003	Aimaduddin Ahmad Khan			Indian National Congress	
2008	Aimaduddin Ahmad Khan			Indian National Congress	
2013	Maman Singh			Bharatiya Janata Party	
2018	Sandeep Kumar			Bahujan Samaj Party	
2018	Sandeep Kumar		2023	Yogi Balaknath	Bharatiya Janata Party

== Election results ==
=== 2023 ===
Rajasthan Legislative Assembly Election, 2023: Tijara
Party	Candidate	Votes	%	±%
BJP	Mahant Balaknath	110,209	49.03	▲26.5
INC	Imran Khan	104,036	46.28	▲16.31
ASP(KR)	Udami Ram	8,054	3.58	
NOTA	None of the above	778	0.35	▼0.12
Majority		6,173	2.75	▲0.32
Turnout		224,795	85.56	▲3.54
BJP gain from INC		Swing		

=== 2018 ===
Rajasthan Legislative Assembly Election, 2018: Tijara
Party	Candidate	Votes	%	±%
BSP	Sandeep Kumar	59,468	32.4	
INC	Aimanuddin Ahmad Khan	55,011	29.97	
BJP	Sandeep Dayma	41,345	22.53	
SP	Fazal Hussain	22,189	12.09	
Independent	Ramvir Ahirwal	1,977	1.08	
NOTA	None of the above	856	0.47	
Majority		4,457	2.43	
Turnout		183,528	82.02	
BSP gain from BJP		Swing		

== See also ==
- List of constituencies of the Rajasthan Legislative Assembly
- Alwar district
