= Mahant Chandnath =

Indian politician (1956–2017)

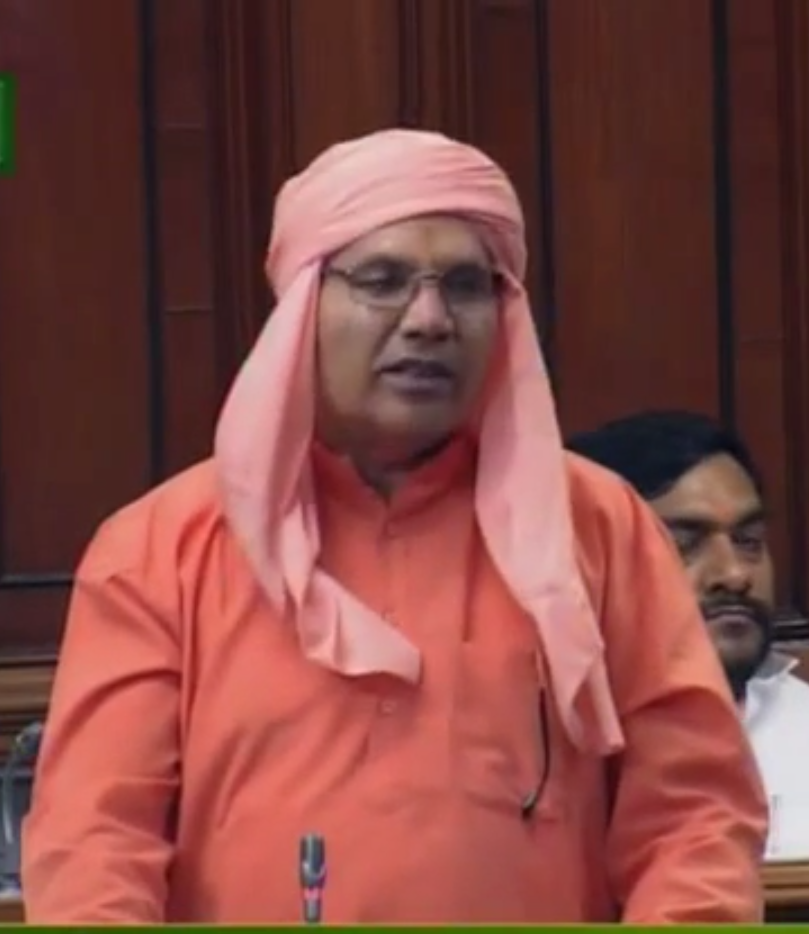
- Mahant Chandnath in Parliament in 2015

Member of Parliament, Lok Sabha
- In office 16 May 2014 – 17 September 2017
- Preceded by: Jitendra Singh
- Succeeded by: Karan Singh Yadav
- Constituency: Alwar

Personal details
- Born: 21 June 1956 Delhi, India
- Died: 17 September 2017 (aged 61) New Delhi, India
- Party: Bharatiya Janata Party
- Education: Hindu College, Delhi University
- Occupation: Politician, monk

Religious life
- Religion: Hinduism
- Denomination: Shaivism
- Temple: Baba Mastnath Math
- Institute: Baba Mastnath University
- School: Yoga
- Lineage: Baba Mastnath
- Sect: Nath Sampradaya
- Ordination: 1978

Religious career
- Teacher: Mahant Shreyonath
- Post: Mahant
- Period in office: 1978–2016
- Successor: Mahant Balaknath
- Disciples: Mahant Balaknath

Mahant Chandnath (21 June 1956 – 17 September 2017) was an Indian politician and religious leader. He represented the Alwar Seat in the Parliament of India and was also the head of the Nath sect of Hinduism. He took ordination from Mahant Shreyonath in 1978.

== Career ==
Chandnath was the Chancellor of the Baba Mast Nath University. He was also the chief of the Nath sect of Hinduism. On 29 July 2016, he declared Mahant Balaknath as his successor in a ceremony that was attended by Yogi Adityanath and Baba Ramdev.

In the 2004 Indian parliamentary election, Chandnath fought for the Alwar seat on a Bharatiya Janata Party ticket. But he was defeated by Karan Singh Yadav, who belonged to the Indian National Congress.

For the 2004 Rajasthan by election, Chandnath was given a ticket to contest the Behror seat. For the election, the party state president Lalit Kishore Chaturvedi and chief minister Vasundhara Raje held election rallies in his constituency. In the election, he emerged victorious by defeating a party rebel Jaswant Singh Yadav by a margin of 13 thousand votes.

In the 2014 Indian Parliamentary election, Chandnath declared assets worth 2 lakh rupees ($3100). In the election, his opponent was Jitendra Singh of the Congress. He won the election and hence became a member of the parliament.

== Controversies ==
During the 2004 election, there was a pending murder charge against Chandnath. During the 2014 Indian Lok Sabha election, a video became popular on the internet where allegedly yoga guru Baba Ramdev asked him to refrain from speaking about the issue of black money before the media.

In February 2017, Chandnath was sentenced to one year rigorous imprisonment by a court in Haryana for criminal conspiracy after being found guilty in a case of land fraud.

== Death ==
Chandnath died on 17 September 2017, aged 61 in a hospital in Delhi due to cancer. Prime Minister Narendra Modi tweeted that he would be remembered for doing social work.

Lok Sabha
Preceded by Jitendra Singh	Member of Parliament for Alwar; 2014 – 2017	Succeeded by Karan Singh Yadav
