= Lalit Yadav =

Lalit Yadav can refer to:

- Lalit Yadav (Delhi cricketer) (born 1997), Indian cricketer
- Lalit Yadav (Vidarbha cricketer) (born 1995), Indian cricketer
- Lalit Yadav (politician) (born 1989), Indian politician
