= Mahant Shreyonath =

Indian politician (born 1904)

Personal details
- Born: 7 January 1904
- Died: 7 January 1985 (aged 81)
- Occupation: Politician, monk

Religious life
- Religion: Hinduism
- Denomination: Shaivism
- Temple: Baba Mastnath Math
- School: Yoga
- Lineage: Baba Mastnath
- Sect: Nath Sampradaya
- Ordination: 1939

Religious career
- Teacher: Mahant Purannath
- Post: Mahant
- Period in office: 1939–1985
- Predecessor: Mahant Purannath
- Successor: Mahant Chandnath
- Disciples: Mahant Chandnath

Mahant Shreyonath (7 January 1904 – 7 January 1985) was the Health Minister of the Indian state of Haryana and sixth chief/ Mahant of the Nath sect of Hinduism. Shreyonath succeeded his guru Mahant Purannath on 28 February 1939. After 39 years he gave ordination in 1978 to Mahant Chandnath. He became associated with the Baba Mastnath Math in Asthal Bohar in Rohtak. He established eye hospital on 1 May 1948 and Mahavidyalya to build healthy and educated community.

== See also ==
- Mahant (first Mahant)
- Mahant Meghnath (Second Mahant)
- Mahant Moharnath (Third Mahant)
- Mahant Chetnath (Fourth Mahant)
- Mahant Purannath (Fifth Mahant)
- Mahant Shreyonath (Sixth Mahant 1939–1978)
- Mahant Chandnath (Seventh Mahant 1978–2016)
- Mahant Balaknath (Eighth Mahant 2016–present)
