= Alwar Urban Assembly constituency =

Legislative Assembly constituency in Rajasthan State, India

Coordinates: 27.56°N 76.62°E

Alwar Urban
- Constituency No. 66 for the Rajasthan Legislative Assembly

Constituency details
- Country: India
- Region: North India
- State: Rajasthan
- District: Alwar
- Lok Sabha constituency: Alwar
- Established: 2008
- Total electors: 263,585
- Reservation: None

Member of Legislative Assembly
- 16th Rajasthan Legislative Assembly
- Incumbent Sanjay Sharma
- Party: Bharatiya Janata Party

Alwar Urban Assembly constituency is one of the 200 Legislative Assembly constituencies of Rajasthan state in India.

The constituency was established in 2008, by the passing of the Delimitation of Parliamentary & Assembly Constituencies Order - 2008. It comprises parts of Alwar tehsil, and is a part of Alwar Lok Sabha constituency. As of 2023, its representative is Sanjay Sharma of the Bharatiya Janata Party.

== Members of the Legislative Assembly ==
| Election | Name | Party |
|---|---|---|
| 2008 | Banwari Lal Singhal | Bharatiya Janata Party |
| 2013 | Banwari Lal Singhal | Bharatiya Janata Party |
| 2018 | Sanjay Sharma | Bharatiya Janata Party |
| 2023 | Sanjay Sharma | Bharatiya Janata Party |

== Election results ==
=== 2023 ===
2023 Rajasthan Legislative Assembly election: Alwar Urban
| Party | Candidate | Votes | % | ±% |
|---|---|---|---|---|
| BJP | Sanjay Sharma | 90,504 | 51.46 | +0.55 |
| INC | Ajay Agarwal | 81,417 | 46.3 | +8.57 |
| NOTA | None of the above | 1,294 | 0.74 | +0.09 |
| Majority | | 9,087 | 5.16 | −8.02 |
| Turnout | | 175,863 | 66.72 | −0.78 |
| BJP hold | | Swing | | |

=== 2018 ===
Rajasthan Legislative Assembly Election, 2018: Alwar Urban
| Party | Candidate | Votes | % | ±% |
|---|---|---|---|---|
| BJP | Sanjay Sharma | 85,041 | 50.91 | |
| INC | Shweta Saini | 63,033 | 37.73 | |
| BSP | Tara Singh | 6,370 | 3.81 | |
| AAP | Ajay Kumar Puniya | 3,507 | 2.1 | |
| Abhinav Rajasthan Party | Navjot Singh Bhamlot | 2,706 | 1.62 | |
| SS | C.A. Shrikishan Gupta | 1,727 | 1.03 | |
| NOTA | None of the above | 1,081 | 0.65 | |
| Majority | | 22,008 | 13.18 | |
| Turnout | | 167,048 | 67.5 | |

== See also ==
- List of constituencies of the Rajasthan Legislative Assembly
- Alwar district
