= List of cities in Haryana by population =

Locations of 10 most populous cities in Haryana

As per 2011 census, Faridabad in National Capital Region is the most populous city of Haryana. This is a list of urban agglomerations and cities, not included in urban agglomerations, with a population above 100,000 as per 2011 census in the Indian state of Haryana.

* UA=urban agglomeration
Rank	Name	District	Type*	Population 2011	Male	Female	Population below 5 yrs	Literacy rate
1	Faridabad	Faridabad	City	1,404,653	750,446	654,207	176,773	84.88
2	Gurgaon	Gurgaon	UA	1,153,000	488,808	413,160	112,094	86.21
3	Rohtak	Rohtak	City	373,133	197,754	175,379	40,715	84.08
4	Hisar	Hisar	City	301,249	163,338	137,911	34,005	81.17
5	Panipat	Panipat	UA	294,150	157,302	136,848	56,581	81.75
6	Karnal	Karnal	UA	286,974	151,668	136,848	33,221	86.02
7	Sonipat	Sonipat	UA	277,053	147,933	129,120	32,932	87.22
8	Yamunanagar	Yamunanagar	UA	216,628	115,404	101,224	40,950	85.72
9	Panchkula	Panchkula	City	210,175	111,622	98,553	22,111	86.91
10	Sirsa	Sirsa	City	200,034	105,578	94,456	22,507	84.39
11	Ambala	Ambala	UA	196,216	103,553	92,683	20,687	82.31
12	Bhiwani	Bhiwani	City	196,438	105,376	91,062	20,161	83.03
13	Bahadurgarh	Jhajjar	City	170,426	91,736	78,690	20,374	88.04
14	Jind	Jind	City	166,225	88,561	77,664	18,825	85.73
15	Thanesar	Kurukshetra	City	154,962	83,655	71,307	15,594	85.73
16	Kaithal	Kaithal	City	144,633	76,657	67,976	16,690	80.76
17	Rewari	Rewari	City	140,864	74,689	66,175	15,986	88.25
18	Palwal	Palwal	City	131,121	69,560	61,561	16,196	80.89
19	Hansi	Hisar	City	86,785	45,128	41,357	4,028	75.1
20	Narnaul	Narnaul	City	74,590	40,279	34,311	4,000	77.3

== Urban agglomeration ==
In the 2011 Census of India, an urban agglomeration was defined as follows:

"An urban agglomeration is a continuous urban spread constituting a town and its adjoining outgrowths (OGs), or two or more physically contiguous towns together with or without outgrowths of such towns. An Urban Agglomeration must consist of at least a statutory town and its total population (i.e. all the constituents put together) should not be less than 20,000 as per the 2001 Census. In varying local conditions, there were similar other combinations which have been treated as urban agglomerations satisfying the basic condition of contiguity."

=== Constituents of urban agglomerations in Haryana ===
The constituents of urban agglomerations in Haryana, with a population of 10 crore or above, are noted below.

- Gurgaon UA includes Gurgaon (M Corp.), Ghata (part) (OG), Daultabad (part) (OG), Naya Behrampur (part) (OG) and Badshahpur (part) (87) (CT).
- Pundri UA includes Pundri (MC), Fatehpur (part) (OG).
- Panipat UA includes Panipat (M Cl), Panipat Taraf Ansar (CT), Panipat Taraf Makhdum Zadgan (CT), Panipat Taraf Rajputan (CT), Sec. 11&12 Part II (CT) and Kabulbag (Part) (OG).
- Yamunanagar UA includes Yamunanagar (M Cl), Jagadhri (M Cl), Sasauli (CT), Pansera (part) (OG) and Kansepur (CT).
- Hisar UA includes Hisar (M Cl) and CCS HAU Campus & Mini Secretariate (OG)
- Karnal UA includes Karnal (M Cl), Phusgarh (part) (OG) and Kailash (part) (OG).
- Sonipat UA includes Sonipat (M Cl), Bandepur (OG), Lahrara (OG) and Fazalpur (81) (CT).
- Ambala UA includes Ambala Sadar (M CL), Ambala (CB), Sarsehri (OG), Babiyal (CT) and Kardhan (CT).
- Palwal UA includes Palwal (M Cl) and Mohannagar (part) (OG).Babiyal

Note: M Corp.= municipal corporation; MCL= municipal council; M= municipality; CT= census town; OG= out growth; NA= notified area; CB= cantonment board

== Urban agglomeration constituents ==
Urban agglomerations constituents with a population above 100,000 as per 2011 census are shown in the table below.

Urban agglomeration	Name of constituent	District	Type*	Population 2011	Male	Female	Population below 5 yrs	Literacy rate
Gurgaon	Gurgaon	Gurgaon	M Corp.	876,824	475,612	401,212	108,623	86.30
Pundri	Pundri	Kaithal	MC	33,484	17,018	15,534	4,028	77.1
Yamunanagar	Yamunanagar	Yamunanagar	M Corp.	216,628	115,404	101,224	22,905	85.91
	Jagadhri	Ymunanagar	M Cl	124,915	67,752	57,163	13,635	85.79
Panipat	Panipat	Panipat	M Cl	294,150	157,302	136,848	35,477	84.29
Hisar	Hisar	Hisar	M Cl	301,249	163,338	137,911	33,514	81.04
Karnal	Karnal	Karnal	M Cl	286,974	151,668	135,306	31,291	86.32
Sonipat	Sonipat	Sonipat	M Cl	277,053	147,933	129,120	30,809	87.56
Ambala	Ambala Sadar	Ambala	M Cl	104,268	54,241	50,027	9,646	87.97
	Ambala	Ambala	M Cl	196,216	103,533	92,683	19,645	88.23
Palwal	Palwal	Palwal	M Cl	127,931	67,887	60,044	15,662	81.00
