= Banwari Lal Singhal =

Indian politician

Member of the Rajasthan Legislative Assembly
- In office 2013–2018
- Succeeded by: Sanjay Sharma
- Constituency: Alwar Urban Assembly constituency

Personal details
- Party: Bharatiya Janata Party
- Occupation: Politician

Banwari Lal Singhal is an Indian politician from the Bharatiya Janata Party and a former member of the Rajasthan Legislative Assembly representing the Alwar Urban Assembly constituency of Rajasthan.
