= Kahni, Rohtak =

Coordinates: 29°01′N 76°41′E

Kahni is a village in Rohtak, Haryana, India.
