= Ramji Lal Yadav =

Indian politician

Ramjilal Yadava

Member of Parliament, Lok Sabha
- In office 1977–1980
- Preceded by: H. P. Sharma
- Succeeded by: Ram Singh Yadav
- Constituency: Alwar

Personal details
- Born: 5 May 1922
- Party: Janata Dal
- Other political affiliations: Bharatiya Lok Dal; Vishal Haryana Party; Indian National Congress
- Education: B.A., LL.B.

Ramjilal Yadava (born 5 May 1922) is an Indian politician and was the member of 6th Lok Sabha. He started his political career in 1952 when he was elected to Rajasthan Legislative Assembly. In 1977 he was elected to Lok Sabha from Alwar as Janata Party candidate and again in 1989 as Janata Dal candidate.
