= Vipakasutra =

Eleventh of the 12 Jain āgamas

Information
- Religion: Jainism

Vipākaśruta is the eleventh of the 12 Jain Angas, which are said to be promulgated by Māhavīra himself and composed by Ganadhara Sudharmaswami according to the Śvetámbara tradition. Vipākaśruta, which translates to "The Scripture about Ripening”, contains stories describing those who experience results relating to karmas.

== Subject matter of the Agama ==
It contains 10 stories of people who experience the fruit of bad karma and 10 stories of people who experience the fruit of good karma. These people however simply do not just experience their fruit, but it is explained what they did in the past that brought about the fruit that they experience. The text mentions about the Rohtak city of Haryana ruled by Vesamanadatta and Pusyanandi. It is eleventh of the twelve angas of Śvetāmbara canonical literature. It was written around ninth century AD.
