= Mahant Balaknath =

Indian politician and spiritual leader (born 1984)

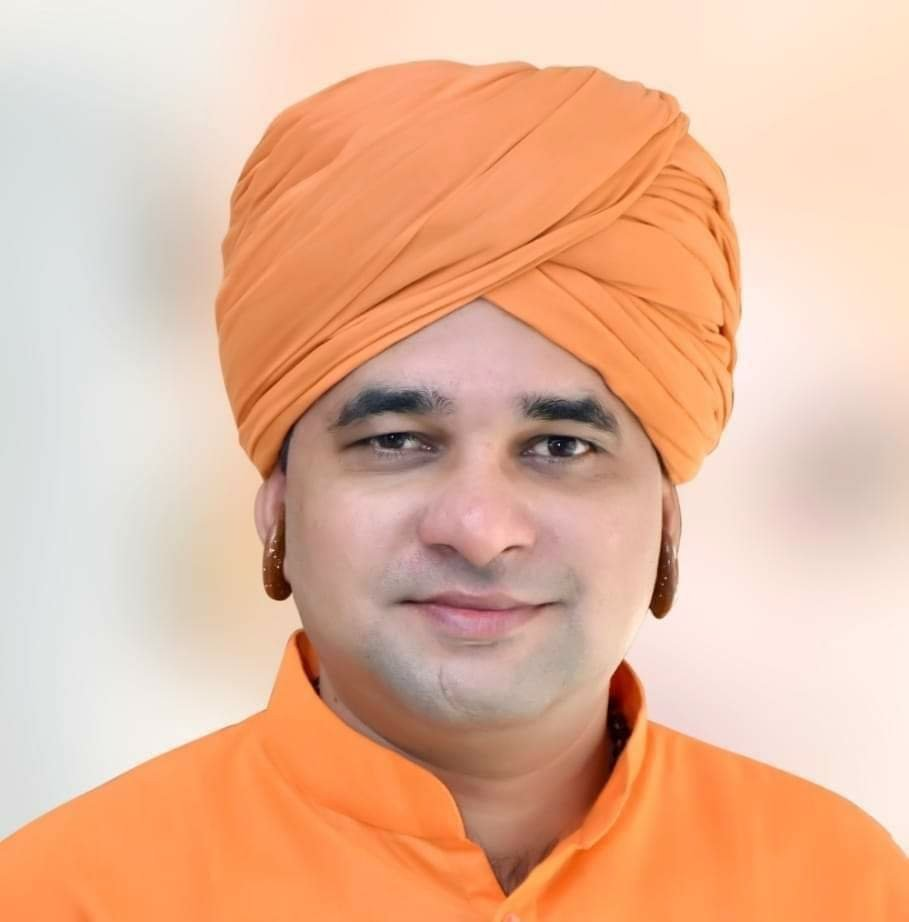

Member of the Rajasthan Legislative Assembly
- Incumbent
- Assumed office 3 December 2023
- Preceded by: Sandeep Yadav
- Constituency: Tijara

Member of Parliament, Lok Sabha
- In office 23 May 2019 – 7 December 2023
- Preceded by: Karan Singh Yadav
- Succeeded by: Bhupender Yadav
- Constituency: Alwar

Personal details
- Born: 16 April 1984 (age 42) Kohrana, Rajasthan, India
- Party: Bharatiya Janata Party
- Occupation: Politician, monk
- Website: yogibalaknath.in

Religious life
- Religion: Hinduism
- Denomination: Shaivism
- Temple: Baba Mastnath Math
- Institute: Baba Mastnath University
- School: Yoga
- Lineage: Baba Mastnath
- Sect: Nath Sampradaya
- Ordination: 2016

Religious career
- Teacher: Mahant Chandnath
- Post: Mahant
- Period in office: 2016–present
- Predecessor: Mahant Chandnath

Mahant Balaknath Yogi (born 16 April 1984) is an Indian politician and current MLA from Tijara constituency in Rajasthan. He is Chancellor of the Baba Mastnath University (BMU), Rohtak, Haryana. He is also 8th Mahant of the Nath sect of Hinduism. On 29 July 2016, Mahant Chandnath declared Balaknath Yogi as his successor in a ceremony which was attended by Yogi Adityanath and Baba Ramdev.

== Early life ==
He was born in the village of Kohrana in Behror tehsil of Rajasthan, Balaknath Yogi’s roots are deeply embedded in Alwar. Coming from an agricultural family, he took his first steps into sannyasa at the age of six-and-a-half, prompting him to leave home and seek solace in an ashram. He was named Gurumukh by Baba Khetanath in his early age. He used to live in Matsyendra Maharaj Ashram from 1985-1991 (up to age of 6) after that he moved to a Math in village Nathawali Theri in Hanumangarh district with Mahant Chandnath.

== Political career ==
Mahant Balaknath Yogi's political foray was shaped by his Guru, Mahant Chandnath, a former Member of Parliament from Alwar. Following in his mentor's footsteps, Balaknath Yogi succeeded him as the head of the Baba Mastnath Mutt in Haryana. A key influencer in his political journey is also the support of yoga guru Baba Ramdev. As Balaknath Yogi traverses the campaign trail, a dedicated team from Mahendragarh in Haryana accompanies him, underlining the widespread backing he enjoys.

Balaknath, emerging as a controversial figure in political circles, has gained attention for his provocative statements and unorthodox comparisons. In a widely circulated video, he drew a parallel between his political contest against Imran Khan and an India-Pakistan cricket match. Asserting that the battle extends beyond mere victory, Balaknath emphasised the significance of securing a favourable voting percentage. He expressed concerns about minority communities uniting against the Sanatan Dharma and highlighted the need to thwart such plans through electoral success.

He was nominated as Bharatiya Janata Party candidate for Lok Sabha from Alwar, Rajasthan and he won the elections in 2019 by defeating Bhanwar Jitendra Singh of Indian National Congress by a margin of 3 Lakh votes.

He resigned from the post of Lok Sabha MP on 7 December 2023 after winning from the Tijara constituency in the 2023 Rajasthan Assembly Elections.

== See also ==
- Mahant Shreyonath sixth Mahant of the Nath sect.
- Mahant Chandnath seventh Mahant of the Nath sect.
