= Bantkhani =

Bantkhani is a village in Behror, Alwar district, Rajasthan state of India.

Bantkhani is 12 km south from National Highway No 48 (NH-48) from Behror. It is connected with all major metro cities of India like New Delhi 115 km, Gurgaon 84 km, Jaipur 132 km by National Highways of India. Indira Gandhi International Airport New Delhi is 110 km from this village and nearest railway station Bawal has a distance of only 24 km.

== Education ==
In this village there is no school right now so village students has to go nearby village government school or private school in area . After completing secondary education most students go to Alwar and Jaipur for further higher education.

== Culture ==
Culture of this area has a vast influence of Haryana. Main speaking language is Rath, as of most of the Rath area. It seems very much closer to Haryanvi. Bantkhani is a village of entirely Hindu population, hence the culture involves all Hindu festivals and rituals.

== Economy ==
Earlier, economy of Bantkhani was based mainly on agriculture but in current years people are becoming less interested into it. Main reasons of that are decreasing land size and ground water table, increasing population, less income levels etc. Nowadays major contributing factors of economy of this village are government and industrial jobs, businesses, agriculture etc. Vicinity of various industrial hubs like Gurgaon, Shahajahanpur, Neemrana, Behror, Bhiwadi, Alwar is providing jobs to many working hands. This is in turn resulting in a higher family income and living standards. The village have more land as compare to other villages in this area. That is why about half of the population is now engaged in agriculture.
