= New Delhi–Moga Shatabdi Express =

Superfast express train in India

New Delhi Moga Shatabdi Express
Overview
- Service type: Superfast Express, Shatabdi Express
- First service: 8 December 2012
- Last service: 2 October 2019
- Current operator: Northern Railways

Route
- Termini: New Delhi; Moga
- Stops: 6
- Distance travelled: 398 km (247 mi)
- Average journey time: 07 hours 05 minutes as 12043 New Delhi Moga Shatabdi Express, 07 hours 10 minutes as 12044 Moga New Delhi Shatabdi Express
- Service frequency: 2 days a week on Monday & Saturday
- Train number: 12043 / 12044

On-board services
- Classes: Executive Class, AC Chair Car
- Seating arrangements: Yes
- Sleeping arrangements: No
- Catering facilities: Yes

Technical
- Rolling stock: Standard Indian Railways Shatabdi coaches
- Track gauge: 1,676 mm (5 ft 6 in)
- Operating speed: 108 km/h (67 mph) maximum, 65.86 km/h (41 mph), including halts

The 12043 / 44 New Delhi–Moga Shatabdi Express was a Superfast Express train of the Shatabdi Express category belonging to Indian Railways – Northern Railway zone that ran between New Delhi and Moga in India.

It operated as train number 12043 from New Delhi to Moga and as train number 12044 in the reverse direction, serving the states of Delhi, Haryana and Punjab. It was replaced by 22485/86 New Delhi–Moga Intercity Express.

== Coaches ==
The 12043 / 44 New Delhi–Moga Shatabdi Express had 1 AC First Class, 10 AC Chair Car and 2 End-on Generator coaches. It did not carry a pantry car but being a Shatabdi category train, catering was arranged on board the train.

As is customary with most train services in India, coach composition may be amended at the discretion of Indian Railways depending on demand.

== Service ==
The 12043 New Delhi–Moga Shatabdi Express covered the distance of 398 kilometres in 07 hours 05 mins (56.19 km/h) and in 07 hours 10 mins as 12044 Moga New Delhi Shatabdi Express (55.53 km/h).

As the average speed of the train was 65.86 km/h (41 mph), as per Indian Railways rules, its fare includes a Superfast surcharge.

== Rake sharing ==
The New Delhi–Moga Shatabdi Express shared its rake with 12037 / 38 New Delhi–Ludhiana Shatabdi Express.

== Routing ==
The 12043 / 44 New Delhi–Moga Shatabdi Express ran from New Delhi via Rohtak Junction, Jind Junction, Ludhiana Junction to Moga.

It reverses direction of travel at Ludhiana Junction.

Being a Shatabdi-class train, it returned to its originating station New Delhi at the end of the day.

== Loco link ==
As the route was yet to be electrified, a Tughlakabad-based WDP-4 powered the train for its entire journey.

== Timings ==
- 12043 New Delhi–Moga Shatabdi Express left New Delhi every Monday and Saturday and reached Moga the same day.
- 12044 Moga–New Delhi Shatabdi Express left Moga every Monday and Saturday and reached New Delhi the same day.
