= Kohrana =

- village
- Location in Rajasthan, India Kohrana (India)
- Coordinates: 27.938°N 76.189°E
- Country: India
- State: Rajasthan
- District: Kotputli-Behror

Area
  - Total: 882 km^{2} (341 sq mi)

Population (2011)
  - Total: 3,607
  - Density: 4.09/km^{2} (10.6/sq mi)

Languages
  - Official: Hindi, Rajasthani
- Time zone: UTC+5:30 (IST)
- PIN: 301713
- ISO 3166 code: RJ-IN

Kohrana is a village in Tehsil Behror in Kotputli-Behror district of Indian state of Rajasthan. Mahant Balaknath is eminent person born in this village. It is near Behror-Narnaul road. Location number code is 071898. Area of village in hectares is 882.00. Total number of household are 644. Total population is 3,607. Males are 1,848 Females are 1,759. 517 are below 6 years and 278 are male 239 are females.
