= New Delhi–Ludhiana Shatabdi Express =

Superfast express train in India

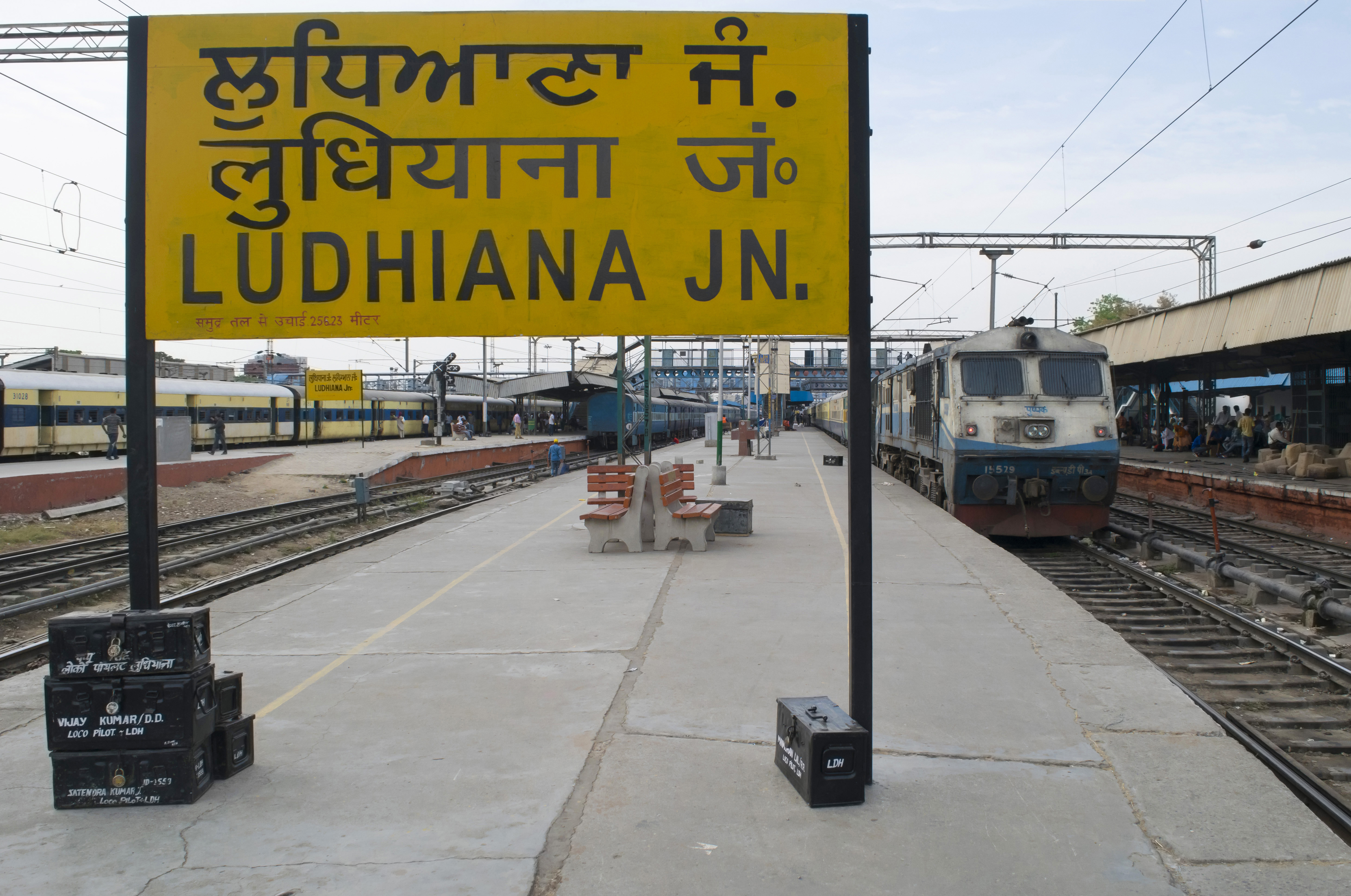
- A WDP-3A-hauled Ludhiana–New Delhi Shatabdi Express at Ludhiana railway station

Overview
- Service type: Superfast Express, Shatabdi Express
- First service: 5 November 2011
- Last service: 3 October 2019
- Current operator: Northern Railways

Route
- Termini: New Delhi; Ludhiana Junction
- Stops: 5
- Distance travelled: 329 km (204 mi)
- Average journey time: 05 hours 25 minutes as 12037 New Delhi–Ludhiana Shatabdi Express, 05 hours 30 minutes as 12038 Ludhiana–New Delhi Shatabdi Express
- Service frequency: 5 days a week except Monday & Saturday
- Train number: 12037 / 12038

On-board services
- Classes: Executive Class, AC Chair Car
- Seating arrangements: Yes
- Sleeping arrangements: No
- Catering facilities: Yes

Technical
- Rolling stock: Standard Indian Railways Shatabdi coaches
- Track gauge: 1,676 mm (5 ft 6 in)
- Operating speed: 100 km/h (62 mph) maximum, 62.37 km/h (39 mph), including halts

The 12037/38 New Delhi–Ludhiana Shatabdi Express was a Superfast Express train of the Shatabdi Express category belonging to Indian Railways – Northern Railway zone that ran between New Delhi and Ludhiana in India.

It operated as train number 12037 from New Delhi to Ludhiana Junction and as train number 12038 in the reverse direction, serving the states of Delhi, Haryana & Punjab.

== Coaches ==
The 12037/38 New Delhi–Ludhiana Shatabdi Express had 1 AC First Class, 10 AC Chair Car and 2 End-on Generator coaches. It did not carry a pantry car but being a Shatabdi category train, catering was arranged on board the train.

As was customary with most train services in India, coach composition may be amended at the discretion of Indian Railways depending on demand.

== Service ==
The 12037 New Delhi Ludhiana Shatabdi Express covered the distance of 329 kilometers in 05 hours 25 mins (62.67 km/h) and in 05 hours 30 mins as 12038 Ludhiana New Delhi Shatabdi Express (62.07 km/h).

As the average speed of the train was above 55 km/h (34 mph), as per Indian Railway rules, its fare included a Superfast surcharge.

== Rake sharing ==
The 12037 / 38 New Delhi–Ludhiana Shatabdi Express shared its rake with 12043 / 44 New Delhi–Moga Shatabdi Express.

== Routeing ==
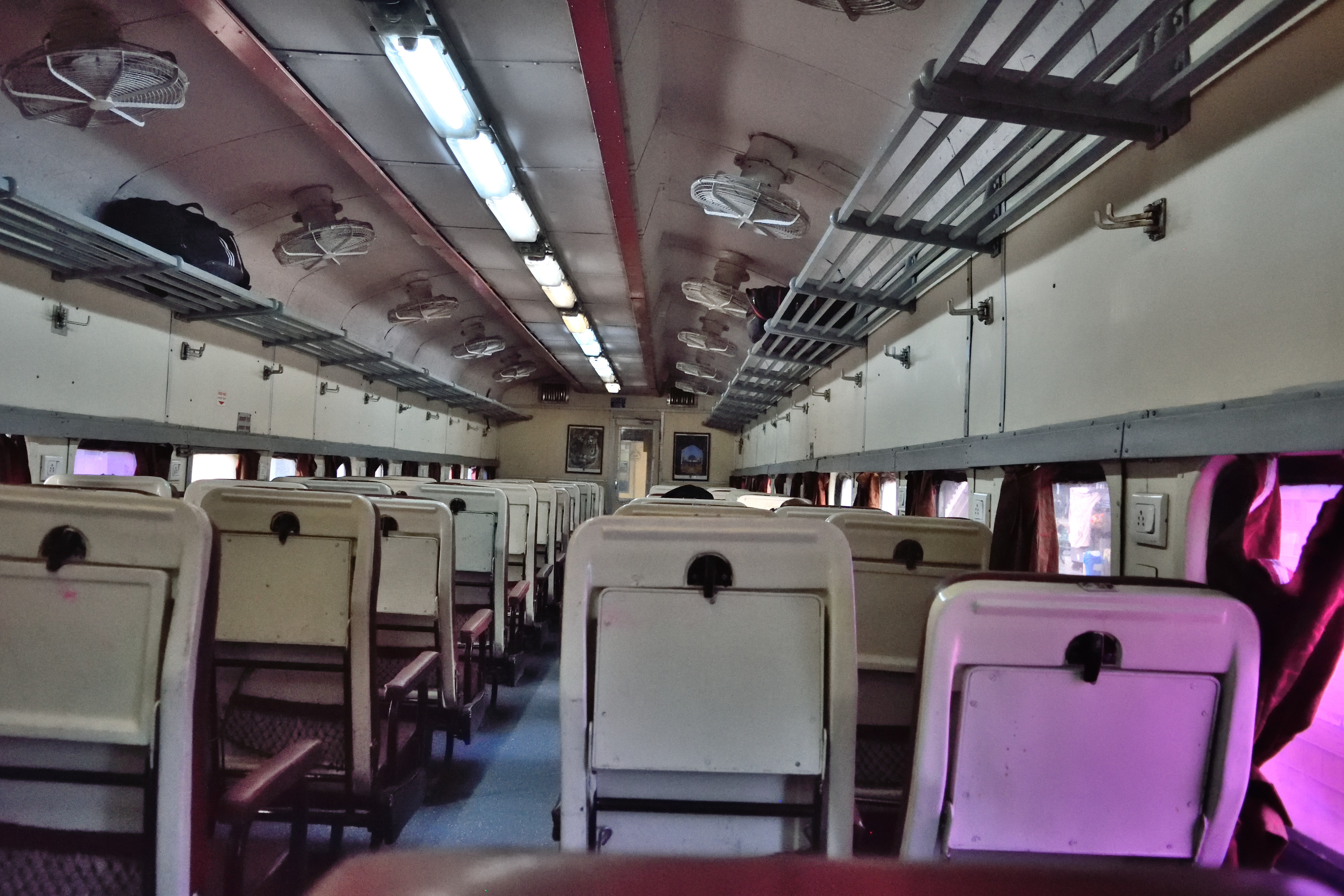
LDH NDLS Shatabdi Interior

The 12037 / 38 New Delhi Ludhiana Shatabdi Express ran from New Delhi via Rohtak Junction, Jind Junction, Dhuri Junction to Ludhiana Junction.

Being a Shatabdi-class train, it returned to its originating station New Delhi at the end of the day.

== Loco link ==
As the route was yet to be electrified, a Tughlakabad-based WDP-3A powered the train for its entire journey.

== Timings ==
- 12037 New Delhi–Ludhiana Shatabdi Express used to leave New Delhi every day except Monday & Saturday at 07:00 hrs IST and reach Ludhiana Junction at 12:25 hrs IST the same day.
- 12038 Ludhiana–New Delhi Shatabdi Express used to leave Ludhiana Junction every day except Monday & Saturday at 16:40 hrs IST and reach New Delhi at 22:10 hrs IST the same day.
