= Shahjahanpur, Neemrana =

Village in Alwar district, Haryana, India

Shajahanpur Village, Neemrana is on National Highway number 8 from Delhi to Jaipur.

== Demographics ==
As of 2011 India census, Shahjahanpur had a population of 1804 in 352 households. Males (931) constitute 51.6% of the population and females (873) 48.39%. Shahjahanpur has an average literacy (1226) rate of 67.96%, less than the national average of 74%: male literacy (729) is 59.46%, and female literacy (497) is 40.53%. In Shahjahanpur, 10.75% of the population is under 6 years of age (194).
