= Jaswant Singh Yadav =

Indian politician (1953–2026)

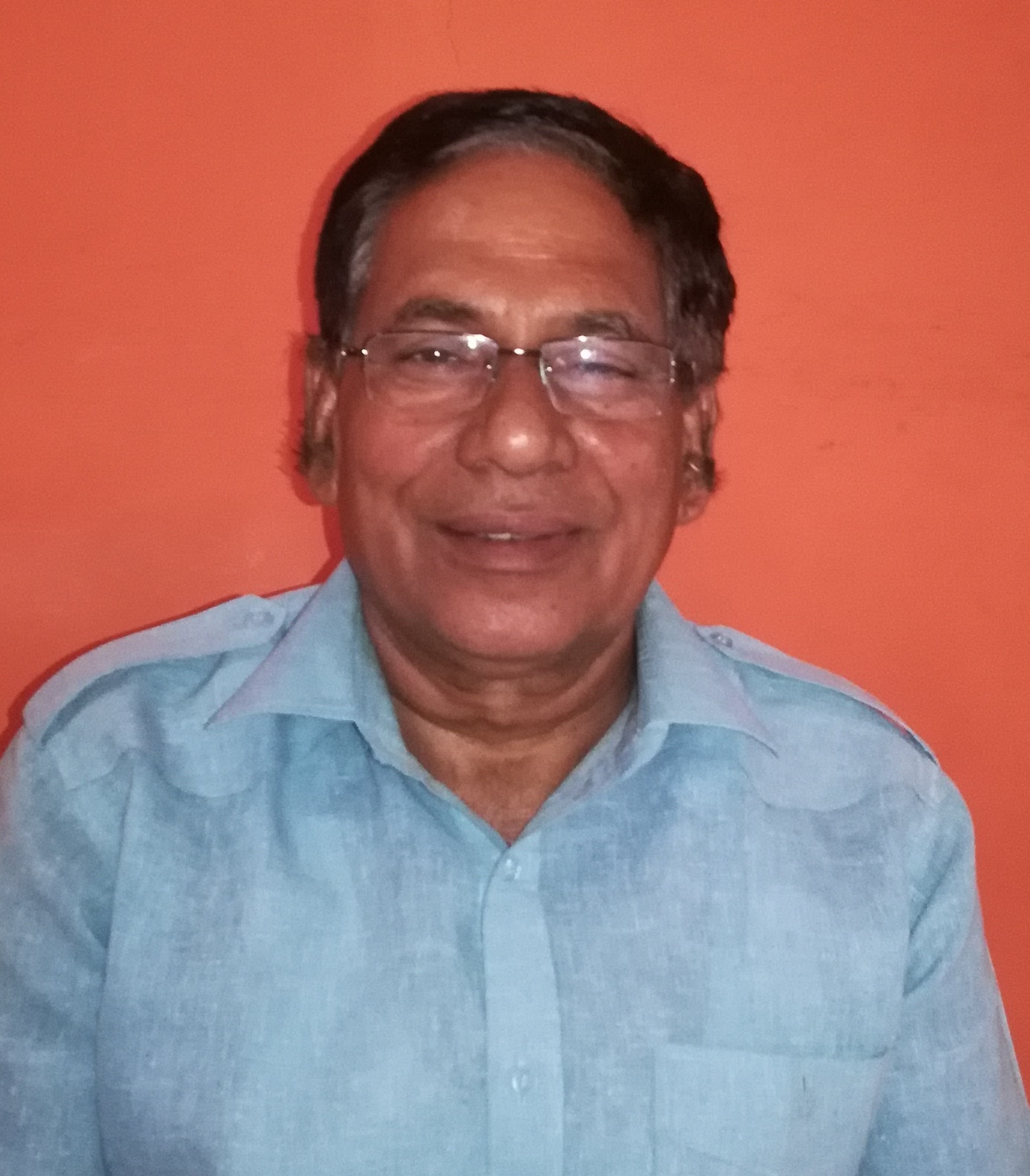

Member of the Rajasthan Legislative Assembly
- In office December 2023 – 8 November 2026
- Preceded by: Baljeet Yadav
- Constituency: Behror
- In office December 2008 – December 2018
- Preceded by: Karan Singh Yadav
- Succeeded by: Baljeet Yadav
- Constituency: Behror

Member of Parliament, Lok Sabha
- In office 1999–2004
- Preceded by: Ghasi Ram Yadav
- Succeeded by: Karan Singh Yadav
- Constituency: Alwar

Personal details
- Born: 5 August 1953 Silpata, Alwar district, Rajasthan, India
- Died: 8 November 2026 (aged 73) Jaipur, Rajasthan, India
- Party: Bharatiya Janata Party
- Education: B.A.M.S., University of Delhi
- Occupation: Politician, physician, social worker, farmer

Jaswant Singh Yadav (5 August 1953 – 8 November 2026) was an Indian politician from Rajasthan. He was a Cabinet Minister for Skills Development, Labour and Employment, Factory and Boilers Inspection, ESI, ITI Minister in Rajasthan Government and a member of the Rajasthan Legislative Assembly representing the Behror Assembly constituency of Rajasthan. He belonged to the Bharatiya Janata Party.

According to his official biography, Yadav held a Bachelor of Ayurveda, Medicine and Surgery (B.A.M.S.) degree.

== Death ==
Yadav died on 8 November 2026, at the age of 73.
