= Dharam Pal Choudhary =

Indian politician

Member of the Rajasthan Legislative Assembly
- In office 2013–2018
- Constituency: Mundawar

Personal details
- Born: 1953 or 1954
- Died: 19 April 2018 (aged 64) Gurugram
- Party: Bharatiya Janata Party
- Occupation: Politician

Dharam Pal Choudhary (1953/1954 – 19 April 2018) was an Indian politician from the Bharatiya Janata Party and a member of the Rajasthan Legislative Assembly representing the Mundawar. He died on 19 April 2018 from a liver disease.
