= Fouladpur =

Village in Rajasthan, India

Fouladpur, the village of villages it also spelt Phouladpur, is a village in the Alwar district of Rajasthan, India. It is 118 kilometres (73 mi) from Delhi and 154 km (96 mi) from Jaipur on the Delhi-Jaipur highway in the Neemrana tehsil, between Neemrana and Shahjahanpur. It is very good place to visit. Here some ancient fort also. This village has a very important role in Rajasthan politics. On an average this village is rich as compared to others.
