= Sanjay Sharma (politician) =

Indian politician

Minister of State, Government of Rajasthan
- Incumbent
- Assumed office 30 December 2023
- Governor: Kalraj Mishra; Haribhau Bagade
- Chief Minister: Bhajan Lal Sharma
- Ministry and Departments: List: Forest (I/C); Environment & Climate Change (I/C); Science & Technology (I/C)
- Preceded by: Hemaram Choudhary

Member of the Rajasthan Legislative Assembly
- Incumbent
- Assumed office 2018
- Preceded by: Banwari Lal Singhal
- Constituency: Alwar Urban

President, BJP Alwar
- In office 2008–2013

Personal details
- Born: 16 February 1969 (age 57) Alwar, Rajasthan, India
- Party: Bharatiya Janata Party
- Spouse: Babita Sharma
- Children: 2
- Education: B.A.
- Occupation: Politician
- Website: sanjaysharmabjp.com

Sanjay Sharma is an Indian politician from Rajasthan. He is serving as the Minister of State with independent charge of the Forest, Environment & Climate Change, and Science & Technology departments in the Government of Rajasthan under the leadership of Chief Minister Bhajan Lal Sharma. He represents the Alwar Urban Assembly constituency in the Rajasthan Legislative Assembly.

== Political career ==
Sanjay Sharma began his active political journey with the Bharatiya Janata Party (BJP) and served as the President of the party's Alwar unit from 2008 to 2013.

He contested the 2018 Rajasthan Legislative Assembly election from the Alwar Urban Assembly constituency and won, defeating the Indian National Congress candidate. He was re-elected in the 2023 Rajasthan Legislative Assembly election, defeating Congress candidate Ajay Agarwal by a margin of 9,087 votes.

== Ministerial role ==
On 30 December 2023, Sharma was inducted into the Bhajan Lal Sharma ministry as a Minister of State with independent charge. He was assigned the portfolios of Forest, Environment & Climate Change, and Science & Technology. Upon taking charge, Sharma emphasized the government’s commitment to fulfilling electoral promises and criticized the opposition for spreading misinformation about the Eastern Rajasthan Canal Project (ERCP).

== Electoral record ==
Election results
Year	Office	Constituency	Party	Votes (Sanjay Sharma)	%	Opponent	Opponent Party	Votes	%	Result	Ref
2023	MLA	Alwar Urban	Bharatiya Janata Party	90,504	51.46	Ajay Agarwal	Indian National Congress	81,417	46.30	Won	
2018	MLA	Alwar Urban	Bharatiya Janata Party	85,041	50.91	Shweta Saini	Indian National Congress	63,033	37.73	Won	
