= Karan Singh Yadav =

Indian politician

Member of Parliament, Lok Sabha
- In office 1 February 2018 – 23 May 2019
- Preceded by: Mahant Chandnath
- Succeeded by: Balak Nath
- Constituency: Alwar
- In office 16 May 2004 – 16 May 2009
- Preceded by: Jaswant Singh Yadav
- Succeeded by: Jitendra Singh
- Constituency: Alwar

Personal details
- Born: 1 February 1945 (age 81) Bikaner, Bikaner State, British India
- Party: Bharatiya Janata Party (2024-present)
- Other political affiliations: Indian National Congress (until 2024)
- Spouse: Kanta Yadav
- Education: Bachelor of Medicine, Bachelor of Surgery; MD Medicine; M.Ch.
- Alma mater: Sardar Patel Medical College, Bikaner; Christian Medical College Vellore

Karan Singh Yadav (born 1 February 1945) is an Indian politician. He was elected to the Lok Sabha for two terms from Alwar. He is a member of the Bharatiya Janata Party.
