= Manjeet Dharampal Choudhary =

Indian politician

Member of the Rajasthan Legislative Assembly
- Constituency: Mundawar

Personal details
- Born: 12 September 1981 (age 44) Jat Behror, Alwar
- Party: Bharatiya Janata Party
- Spouse: Manisha Singh
- Occupation: Politician

Manjeet Dharampal Choudhary (born 12 September 1981) is an Indian politician from the Bharatiya Janata Party and a member of the Rajasthan Legislative Assembly who represented the Mundawar Vidhan Sabha constituency of Rajasthan.
