= Rohtak =

- City
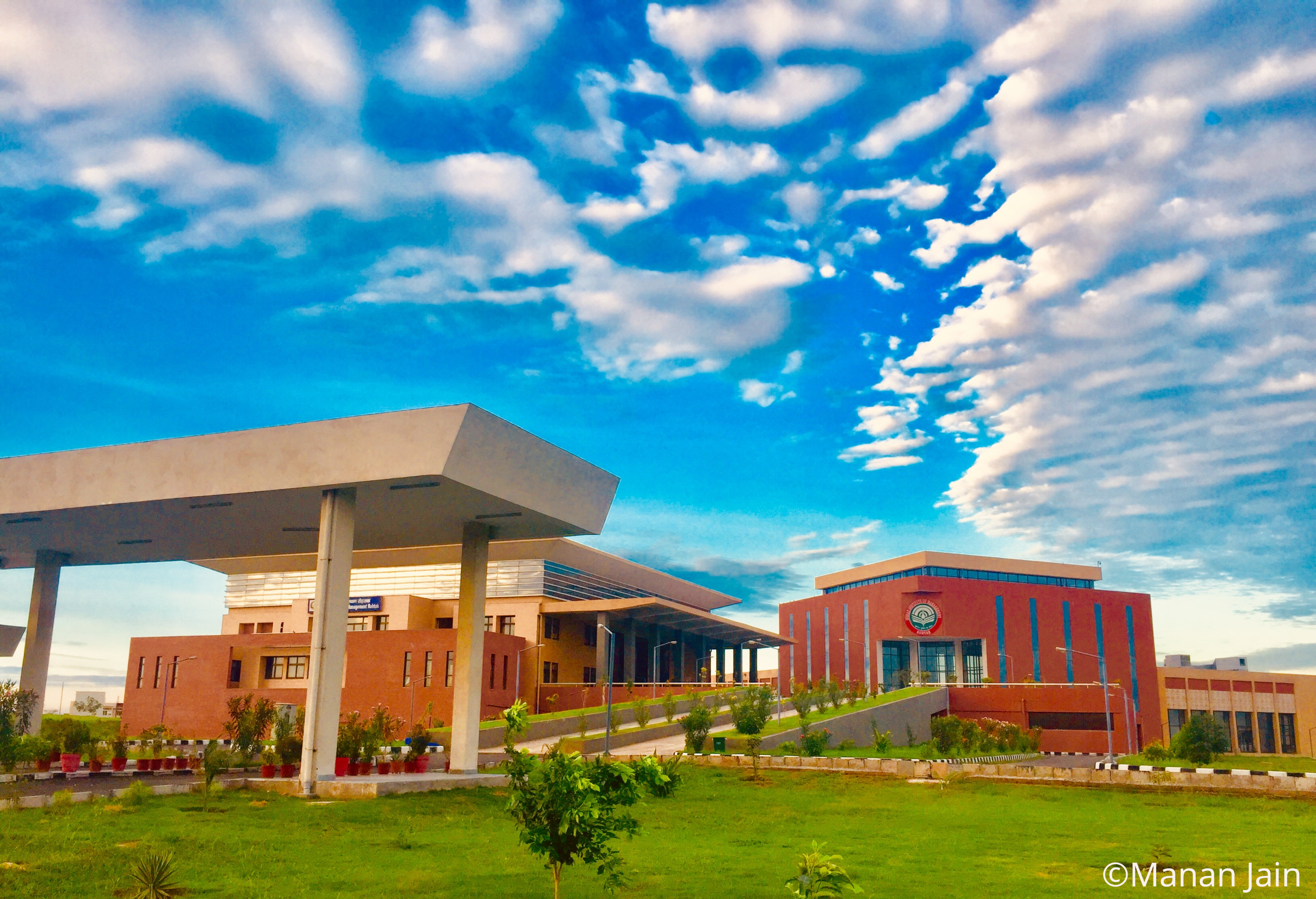
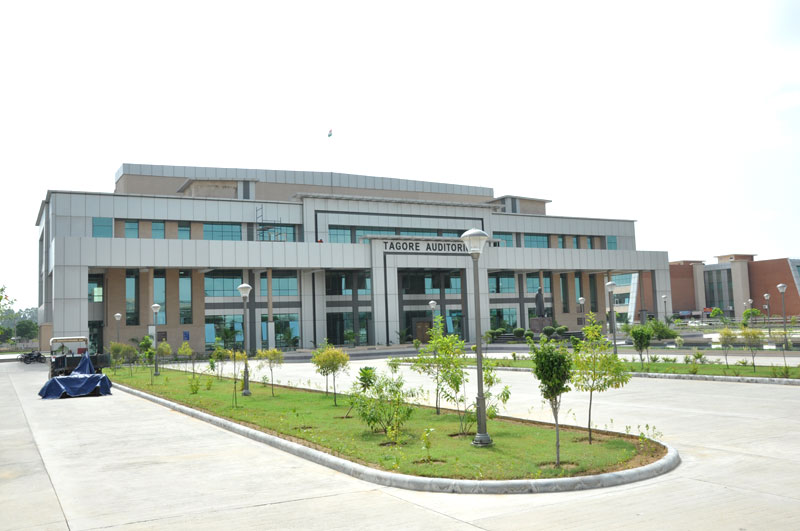
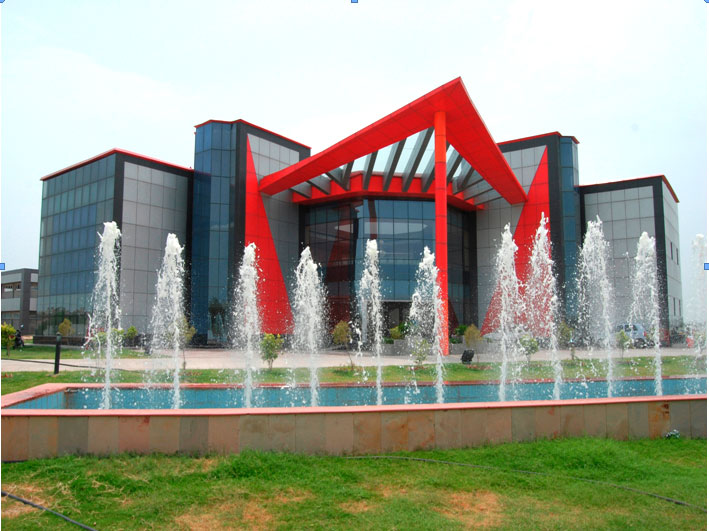
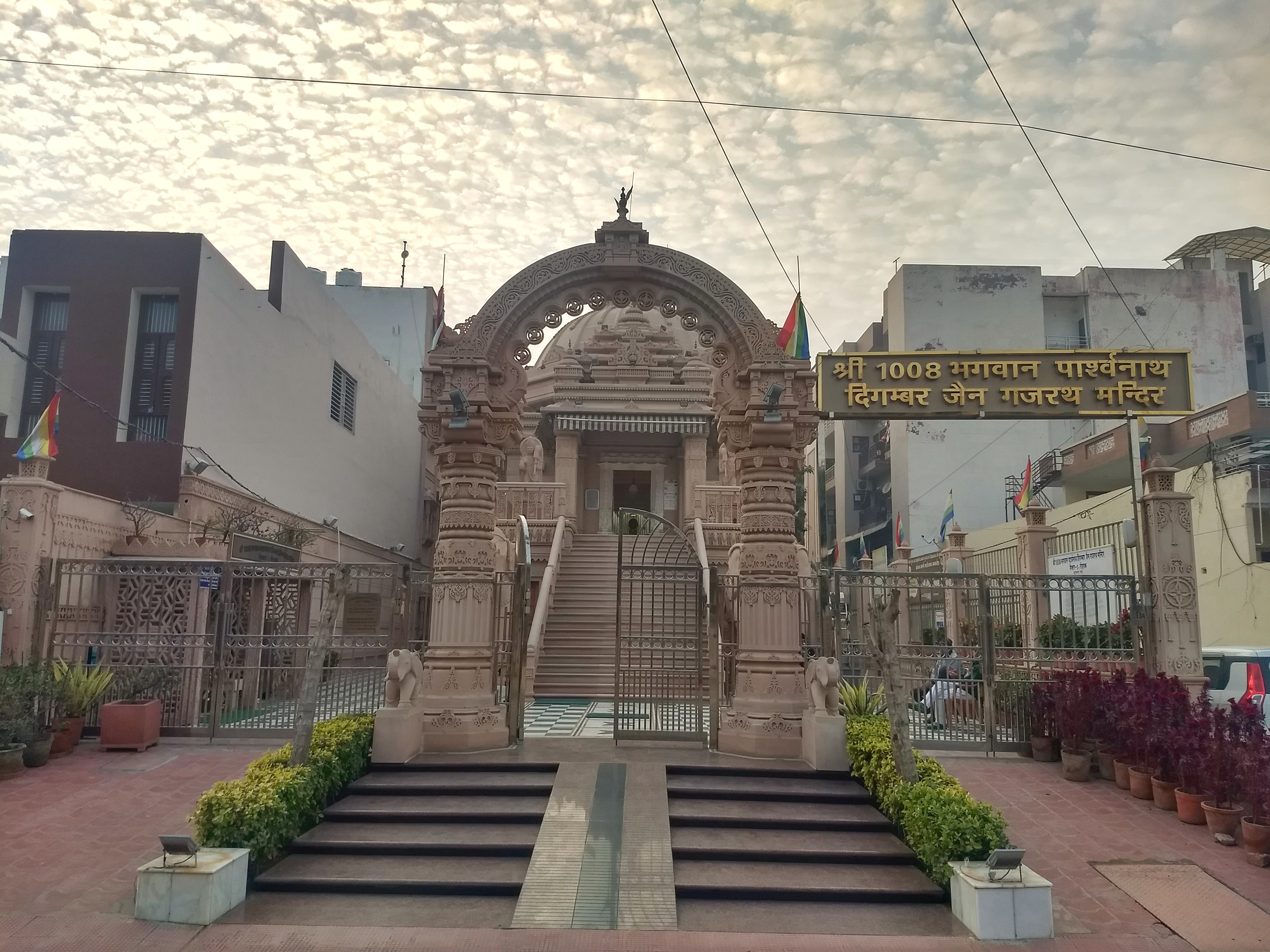
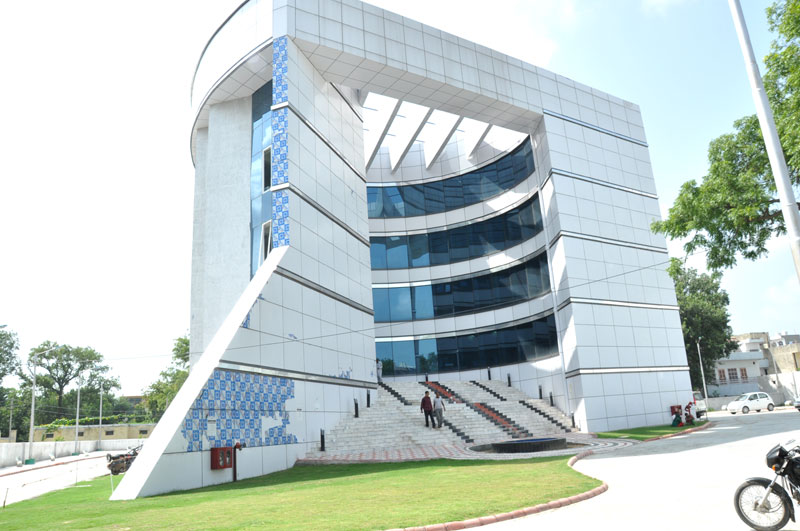
- IIM Rohtak Tagore auditorium mdu rohtak Gymkhana club rohtak Gaj Madir - Rohtak Electricity office rohtak

- Location in Haryana, India Rohtak (India)
- Coordinates: 28.8909°N 76.5796°E
- Country: India
- State: Haryana
- District: Rohtak

Government
  - Type: Municipal corporation
  - Body: Rohtak Municipal Corporation
  - Mayor: Ramavtar Valmiki (BJP)
  - Lok Sabha MP: Deepender Singh Hooda (INC)
  - MLA: Bharat Bhushan Batra (INC)
  - Municipal Commissioner: Dharmender Singh (IAS)

Area
  - Total: 139 km^{2} (54 sq mi)
  - Rank: 5
- Elevation: 220 m (720 ft)

Population (2011)
  - Total: 373,133
  - Rank: 119
  - Density: 2,680/km^{2} (6,950/sq mi)
- Demonym: Rohtakiya Haryanvi

Languages
  - Official: Hindi
  - Additional official: English, Punjabi
  - Regional: Haryanvi (Khadar)
- Time zone: UTC+5:30 (IST)
- PIN: 124 001 – 124 017
- Telephone code: 91 1262 XXX XXX
- Vehicle registration: HR 12 (Private), HR 46 (Commercial)
- Major Highways: NH10, NH71, NH71A & SH18
- Nearest City: Jhajjar, Sonipat, New Delhi
- Railways Stations in City: Rohtak Jn, Asthal Bohar Junction railway station
- Sex ratio: 1.13 ♂/♀
- Planning agency: Haryana Urban Development Authority
- Civic agency: Municipal Corporation of Rohtak
- Climate: Climatic regions of India (Köppen)
- Avg. summer temperature: 44 °C (111 °F)
- Avg. winter temperature: 13 °C (55 °F)
- Website: rohtak.gov.in

Rohtak (Hindustani pronunciation: [roɦ.t̪ək]) is a city and the administrative headquarters of the Rohtak district in the Indian state of Haryana. It lies 70 kilometres (43 mi) north-west of New Delhi and 250 kilometres (160 mi) south of the state capital Chandigarh on NH 9 (old NH 10). Rohtak forms a part of the National Capital Region (NCR) which helps the city in obtaining cheap loans for infrastructure development from the NCR Planning Board.

Rohtak is the third most populous city in Haryana as per the 2011 census with a population of 373,133.

== Name ==
Rohtak derived its name from an earlier designation, Rohtasgarh, meaning “Fort of Rohtas”, after the ruler Raja Rohtas, a Rajput chieftain associated with the early settlement and fortification of the area. Local historical traditions and early colonial records state that the town was founded during the reign of Raja Rohtas, from whom the name Rohtak is said to have evolved.

Rohtak is identified with the older form Rauhītaka, which occurs in the 12th-century Rājataraṅgiṇī as the name of a town and district in northern India. The name also appears in the "Praśasti of Lākhā Maṇḍal at Madha".

== History ==
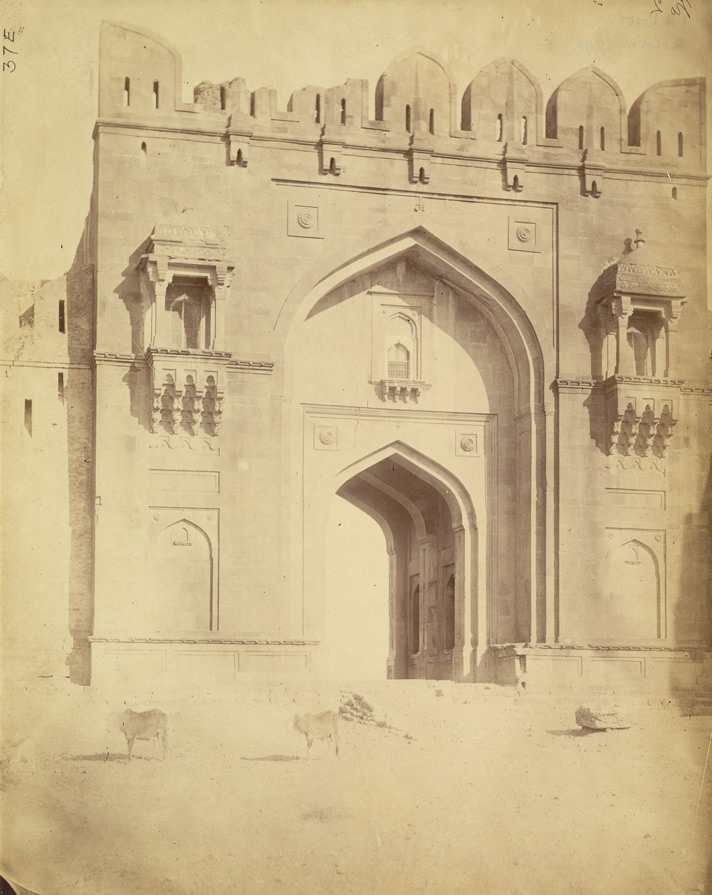
Suhaili Gate of the Rohtak Fort, 1870; photographed by Joseph David Beglar.

Clay mounds of coins discovered at Khokhrakot have thrown light on the process of casting coins in ancient India. Dating to the 3rd or 4th century CE, a large number of coin moulds from the Yaudheyas reign have been unearthed from Khokhrakot, alongside various clay seals from that period and beyond. 4th to 6th century CE, Gupta terracotta plaque and a head from later era have also been discovered at Khokhrakot archaeological site at Rohtak.

The 4th-century CE astronomical text Surya Siddhanta described a spherical Earth with a prime meridian running between Avanti (Ujjain) and Rohitaka (Rohtak), while localities used their own time based on the local Panchang calendar.

A seventh century CE statue of Parshvanatha, twenty-third Jain tirthankara, was found in the Asthal Bohar village.

Ninth century jain sources, like the Vipakasutra, reveal the prominence of the Jain deity Parshvanatha and his protector Dharanendra in Rohtak around this time. The Vipakasutra is one of twelve ancient texts of Śvetāmbara Jainism, written around ninth century CE, as a kingdom of kings Vesamanadatta and Pusyanandi.

The town continued to flourish till the 10th century CE, as coins of King Samanta Deva of the Hindu Shahi have been found here. The town was conquered by the Ghaznavids under Mahmud of Ghazni between 1020-1030.

In the 12th century, Chahamanas ruled in the Rohtak region.

Sixteenth century source the Ain-i-Akbari lists Rohtak as a Mughal pargana under Delhi sarkar, producing a revenue of 8,599,270 dams for the imperial treasury and supplying a force of 2000 infantry and 100 cavalry. The existence of a brick fort was also noted. The pargana was dominated by the Jats.

=== Third Battle of Panipat in 1761 and aftermath ===
According to Rao Uttam Singh from Sangrur, Keshavdas Pardhan, who may be an ancestor of the Vachhas family of Rohtak, was stationed at Kotputli during the Third Battle of Panipat leading Maratha Empire forces under a Peshwa general. His duties involved managing supplies, maintaining vigilance, and reporting enemy movements. After the Panipat defeat, Keshavdas and his cousin Bhajan settled in Dadri. Records from the Pandas of Garhmukteshwar suggest his descendants' prominent status. These descendants are identified as Gaur Brahmins with Vatsa gotra.

In the year 1762, Suraj Mal, the Jat ruler of Bharatpur State sent his two sons Jawahar Singh and Nahar Singh to capture what is now modern Haryana. They successfully captured Rohtak pargana from Muslims.

== Geography ==
Rohtak lies 70 kilometres (43 mi) north-west of New Delhi and 250 kilometres (160 mi) south of the state capital Chandigarh on NH 9(old NH 10). Rohtak forms a part of the National Capital Region.

=== Climate ===
Rohtak features a hot-semi arid climate typical of central and western Haryana. Average annual rainfall in Rohtak city is 613.5 mm (24.15 in). Rohtak's climate shows extreme variation in temperature. Temperatures in Rohtak usually range from 2 to 46 °C (36 to 115 °F). It does not usually fall below freezing point in the winter months from November to February. In summer from April to June, the day temperature generally remains between 30 °C (86 °F) and 42 °C (108 °F). The highest temperature ever recorded in Rohtak city was 48.8 °C (119.8 °F) (29 May 2024) while the lowest recorded temperature is −0.8 °C (30.6 °F) (24 December 2011).

Climate data for Rohtak (1991–2020, extremes 1967–present)
Month	Jan	Feb	Mar	Apr	May	Jun	Jul	Aug	Sep	Oct	Nov	Dec	Year
Record high °C (°F)	30.4 (86.7)	33.6 (92.5)	40.0 (104.0)	45.0 (113.0)	48.8 (119.8)	47.2 (117.0)	44.9 (112.8)	41.3 (106.3)	40.5 (104.9)	39.4 (102.9)	37.0 (98.6)	30.3 (86.5)	48.8 (119.8)
Mean daily maximum °C (°F)	20.1 (68.2)	24.0 (75.2)	29.4 (84.9)	37.1 (98.8)	40.4 (104.7)	39.5 (103.1)	36.0 (96.8)	34.4 (93.9)	34.1 (93.4)	33.2 (91.8)	28.7 (83.7)	23.0 (73.4)	31.7 (89.1)
Daily mean °C (°F)	13.5 (56.3)	16.9 (62.4)	22.0 (71.6)	28.6 (83.5)	32.6 (90.7)	33.1 (91.6)	31.4 (88.5)	30.2 (86.4)	29.1 (84.4)	25.7 (78.3)	20.4 (68.7)	15.2 (59.4)	25.0 (77.0)
Mean daily minimum °C (°F)	6.9 (44.4)	9.8 (49.6)	14.6 (58.3)	20.1 (68.2)	24.7 (76.5)	26.6 (79.9)	26.8 (80.2)	26.0 (78.8)	24.1 (75.4)	18.1 (64.6)	12.0 (53.6)	7.3 (45.1)	18.2 (64.8)
Record low °C (°F)	−0.5 (31.1)	0.2 (32.4)	2.0 (35.6)	10.4 (50.7)	10.5 (50.9)	19.0 (66.2)	19.4 (66.9)	21.1 (70.0)	15.0 (59.0)	8.3 (46.9)	2.9 (37.2)	−0.8 (30.6)	−0.5 (31.1)
Average rainfall mm (inches)	10.9 (0.43)	18.0 (0.71)	11.1 (0.44)	14.5 (0.57)	35.8 (1.41)	62.1 (2.44)	143.8 (5.66)	193.0 (7.60)	99.3 (3.91)	16.0 (0.63)	4.7 (0.19)	4.5 (0.18)	613.5 (24.15)
Average rainy days	1.2	1.6	1.2	1.2	2.3	3.8	7.2	7.2	4.7	0.7	0.3	0.4	31.8
Average relative humidity (%) (at 17:30 IST)	62	51	42	28	29	43	64	70	63	50	53	58	51
Source: India Meteorological Department

=== Rainfall ===
Annual rainfall of the district is about 58 cm. The rainfall is unevenly distributed and decreases from south east to south west. About 80% of the total rainfall is received during the rainy season, which lasts from July to September. Some rainfall is received from western disturbances during the winter season. Due to the low rainfall and its short duration, agricultural activities are mostly dependent upon canal irrigation and tubewells.

=== Hydrology ===
The development of the area largely depends over the quality as well as quantity of ground water. As far as Rohtak District is concerned ground water occurs in semi-confined to unconfined aquifers. The unconfined aquifers are tapped by dugwells. While the semi-confined aquifers are tapped by shallow tubewells which are 22,000 in number.

== Demographics ==
Historical Population
Year	Pop.	±%
1901	20,323	—
1911	20,361	+0.2%
1921	25,240	+24.0%
1931	35,235	+39.6%
1941	48,148	+36.6%
1951	71,902	+49.3%
1961	88,193	+22.7%
1971	124,755	+41.5%
1981	166,767	+33.7%
1991	216,096	+29.6%
2001	294,577	+36.3%
2011	373,133	+26.7%
Source: District Census Handbook

Rohtak is the sixth most populous city in the state of Haryana with a population of 373,133 as per the provisional 2011 census figures. The population in 2001 was 294,577, and the population growth rate during 2001-2011 was 26.7%. Spread over an area of 72.18 square kilometres (27.87 sq mi), Rohtak is inhabited by 75,528 families, and the population density of the city is 5,186 persons per square kilometre, which is higher than the state average density of 573 persons per square kilometre.

The city had a sex ratio of 946 females per 1,000 males and 10.9% of the population were under six years old. Effective literacy was 84.08%; male literacy was 88.94% and female literacy was 78.68%.

=== Religion ===
Religion in Rohtak City (2011)
Religion	Percent
Hinduism	97.11%
Jainism	0.91%
Islam	0.91%
Sikhism	0.85%
Other or not stated	0.22%

According to the 2011 Census of India, most of the inhabitants of the city are followers of Hinduism, with a minor Jain, Muslim and Sikh population.

==== City ====
Religion in Rohtak City
Religion	Population (1911)	Percentage (1911)	Population (1941)	Percentage (1941)
Hinduism (Note: 1941 census: Including Ad-Dharmis)	9,941	48.82%	20,458	42.49%
Islam	9,428	46.3%	25,129	52.19%
Christianity	87	0.43%	63	0.13%
Sikhism	67	0.33%	315	0.65%
Others (Note: Including Jainism, Buddhism, Zoroastrianism, Judaism, or not stated)	838	4.12%	2,183	4.53%
Total Population	20,361	100%	48,148	100%

==== Tehsil ====
Religion in Rohtak Tehsil
Religion	Population (1941)	Percentage (1941)
Hinduism	196,993	74.62%
Islam	64,026	24.25%
Sikhism	481	0.18%
Christianity	243	0.09%
Others	2,241	0.85%
Total Population	263,984	100%

== Government and politics ==
There is a mini Secretariat in the city, located near the court.

=== Infrastructure ===
The Haryana Government has asked the Union Government to declare Haryana Sub-Region (HSR) a zone of strategic national interest. HSR consists of 35 urban centres, including Gurgaon, Faridabad, Panipat, Sonepat and Rohtak. The growth rate of urban population in the zone has been above 60 per cent, the highest among all the constituents of National Capital Region. These urban centres face a rapid growth in population as the workforce travels to work from here to the Capital.

=== Sectors ===
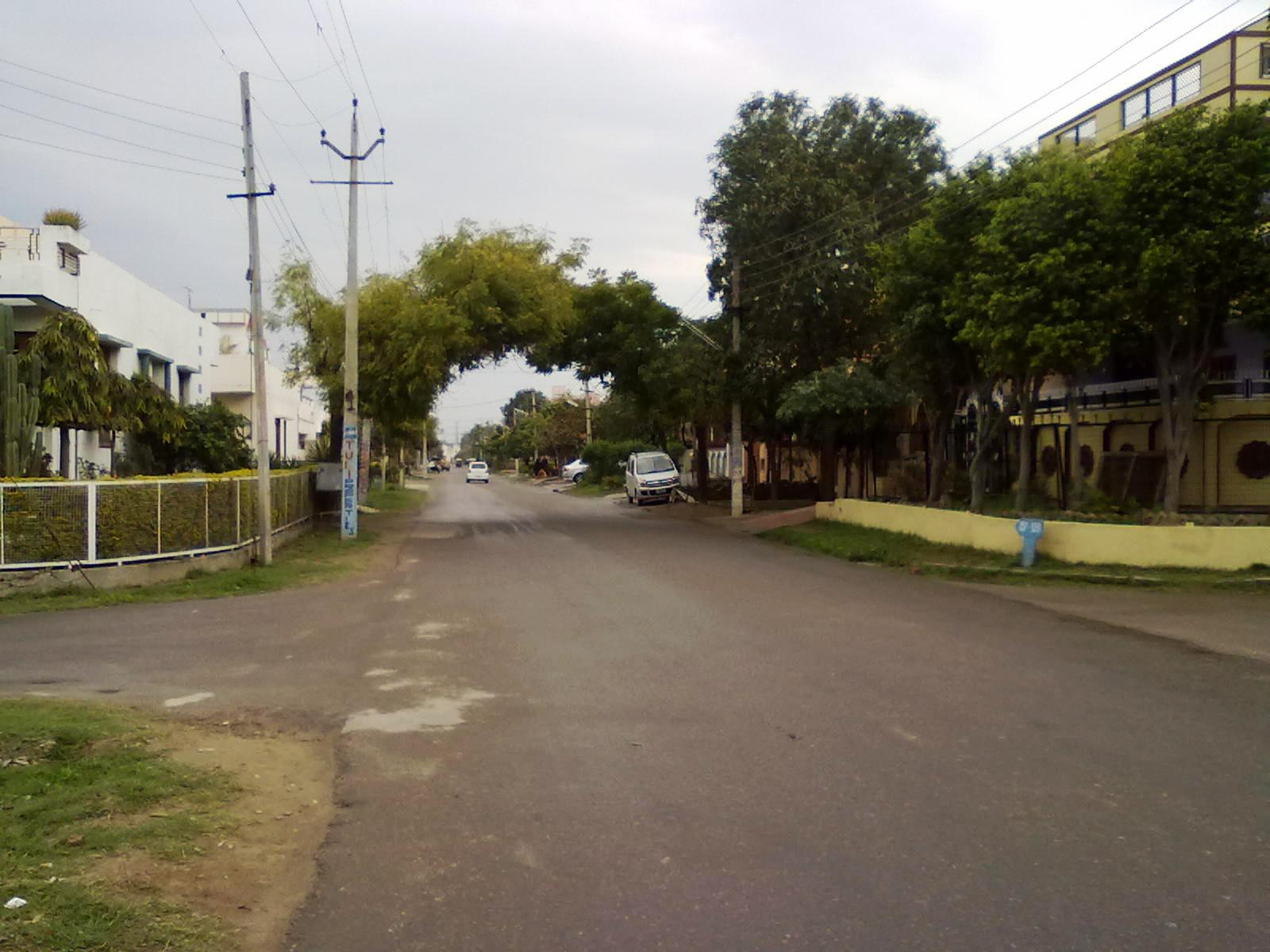
Sector 1 rohtak

Old sectors of the city are Sector 14, Sector 1, Sector 2, Sector 3 and Sector 4. Sectors 5, 6, 28 (Omaxe City) and 34-36 (Suncity) were recently developed, while Sector 21, Sector 25 and Sector 27 are currently in the process of development. Model Town, DLF Colony, Sector 1 and Sector 14 are considered to be upmarket areas of the city. Entrance of Sector-14 is opposite to Gate number 2 of Maharshi Dayanand University. D-Park, Model Town comprises all branded showrooms and one of the best places to hangout in the city.

=== Smart City contender ===
Chief Minister Manohar Lal Khattar's hometown, Karnal, tops the cities shortlisted by the screening committee for the ‘smart city’ tag at a meeting. Faridabad was placed second while Gurgaon, Rohtak and Hisar could seize only the third spot. The Department of Urban Local Bodies asked for recommendations for smart city contenders from all municipal bodies.

Rohtak's Ex Mayor Renu Dabla (presently Manmohan Goyal) has stated that the process adopted for the selection of Haryana districts for the Smart City project was biased and based on political considerations.

=== Facilities ===
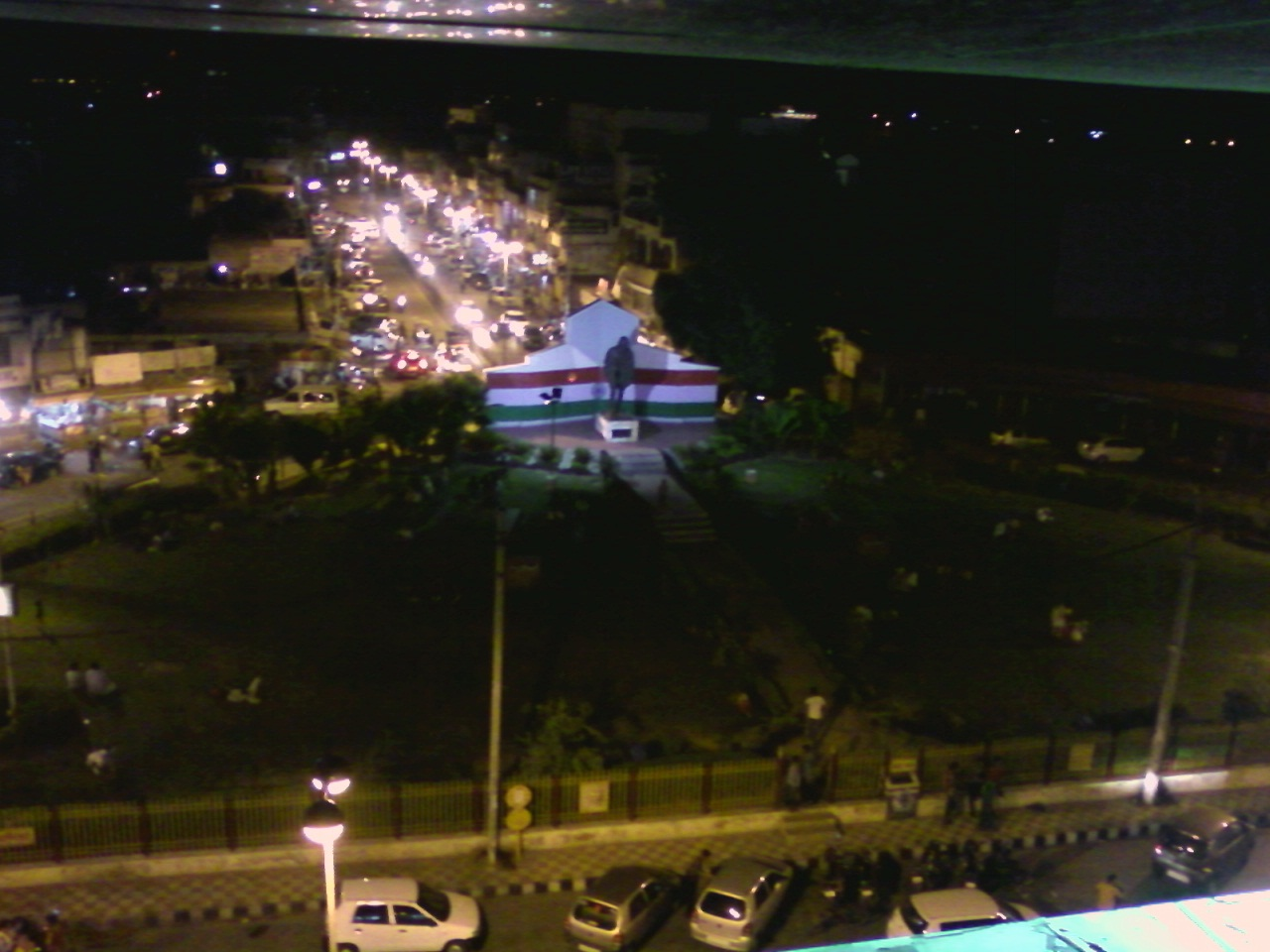
View of D-Park, Model Town

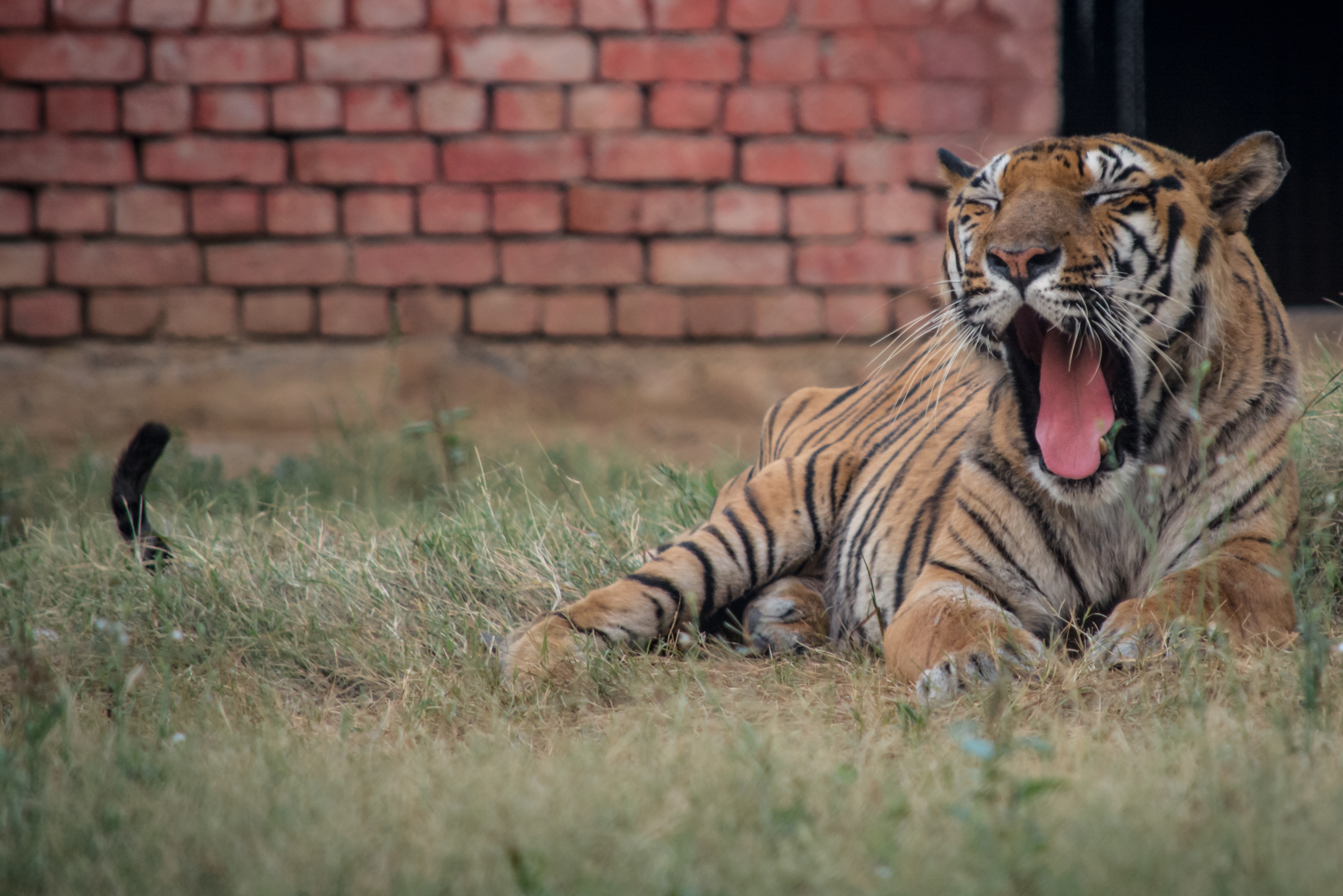
Tiger yawning at Rohtak Zoo

The Municipal Corporation has prepared a strategy for future developments, that includes new residential areas, healthy environment, and maintained roads. Manohar Lal Khattar, the Haryana CM, formally launched the country's first railway elevated track project on 17 March 2018. The ambitious, 6-km track, costing around Rs 316 crore, is set to come up on the Rohtak-Panipat line in 18 months, and the existing railway track will be replaced by a road, which will be built at the cost of Rs 8 crore.

=== Healthcare ===
The city hosts the Pandit Bhagwat Dayal Sharma Post Graduate Institute of Medical Sciences and Civil Hospital, both of which are operated by the state government. There are also various privately operated medical facilities. Pt B.D.Sharma, PGIMS, Rohtak has situated at a distance of about 240 km from Chandigarh and about 70 km from Delhi on Delhi-Hissar-Sirsa-Fazilka National Highway (NH-10). It is the only major Institution for Medical Education and Research and a tertiary care centre for provision of specialised health care services not only to the people of the State of Haryana, but also to those from Punjab, Rajasthan, Delhi and western U.P. The Institute was started under the name of Medical College, Rohtak in the year 1960. For the first three years, the students were admitted to Medical College, Patiala which acted as a host Institution. In 1963, the students were shifted to Rohtak. In the subsequent years, multifaceted expansion measures have transformed the Institute into a fully developed centre of Medical Education and research in all the major disciplines of Medicine. In the year 1994, Medical College, Rohtak was renamed as Pt. B.D.Sharma, Medical College, Rohtak and subsequently, it was upgraded to a Post Graduate Institute of Medical Sciences in the year 1995. Today Pt. B.D.Sharma, PGIMS, Rohtak is a famous institution not only for medical education but also for the healthcare facilities both at the National as well as International level.

The institute has a campus spread over an area of 350 acres of land. During the 50 years of its existence, Pt. B.D.Sharma, PGIMS, Rohtak has witnessed a growth achieving not only its designated goals but also in expanding its horizons to set newer objectives completely commensurable with the requirements of the National goal of “Health for all by 2020”.

=== Sewerage ===
In NCR, out of 108 towns only 33 towns have sewerage system and even in these 33 towns, the coverage can at best be classified as partial. The network coverage in some of the important cities in NCR includes NCT Delhi, Meerut, Ghaziabad, Noida, Faridabad, Panipat, Gurgaon, Rohtak, Sonepat and Alwar where Rohtak was completed 65% in 2001 and 90% in 2011 according to an official report.

=== Political controversy ===
The development of Rohtak caused controversy in 2013 as a result of the allegedly disproportionate number of state development projects that have been awarded to the city by Chief Minister Bhupinder Singh Hooda, who was born in a nearby village. This has led to severe criticism by both the opposition parties and some members of the governing Indian National Congress party, who have attacked Hooda for bias. Rao Inderjit Singh, a BJP leader from South Haryana, used Right to Information requests to determine that from a total of 5,135 announcements of schemes in the state, 2,045 went to the three districts of Rohtak, Jhajjar and Sonepat. These areas were in Hooda's own constituency and that of his son, the Lok Sabha MP Deepeder Singh Hooda. Of the 3,356 completed schemes, 1,560 were from these three districts whereas 1,796 schemes were completed in the rest of the state. Ambala MP Selja Kumari is also against the region-specific and biased development of Rohtak.

The Haryana Urban Development Authority has spent over Rs 3.4 billion on the development of Rohtak. Until 31 December 2010 collected Rs 3.22 billion as external development charges in Rohtak and spent almost Rs 6.63 billion of the fund.

However, the most developed cities of the state based expenditure on infrastructure over the last 15 years are Gurgaon, Faridabad, Hisar, Panchkula, Panipat and Ambala.

== Economy ==
=== Industrial areas and townships ===
As of 2018, Haryana State Industrial and Infrastructure Development Corporation (HSIIDC) has developed an Industrial Model Township (IMT). MNCs like Maruti Suzuki, Asian Paints, Suzuki Motorcycle, Nippon Carbide, Amul, Lakshmi Precision Screws and Aisin Automotive launched work on projects.

=== Maruti research and development plant ===
Maruti is developing a mega research and development facility at Rohtak. The progress as R C Bhargava, non-executive chairman of Maruti Suzuki India, says "We will be able to do research and development and testing comparable to anything Japan has. We used to send all our models to Japan for testing; all that can be done here. There will be saving of time and money."

== Culture ==
A very old and antique heritage has been preserved in Rohtak. Baba Mast Nath Math, Gokaran, kiloi temple, and several more such fine looking buildings erected in traditional Indian and Mughal styles such as spacious havelis with ornate facade, finely carved wooden door sets and sandstone pillars, mosques that were once lavishly decorated in stucco work, dharamshalas with fine looking statues of Radha and Krishna and temple spires and are few of them. The survey was extended to study a few large village estates such as Balambha, Farmana Khas, Lakhan Majra, jassia, Bhaini Surjan and Meham by Society for Peoples’ Advancement, Technology and Heritage (SOPATH). The present Monastery was founded by Baba Mast Nath in 1731.

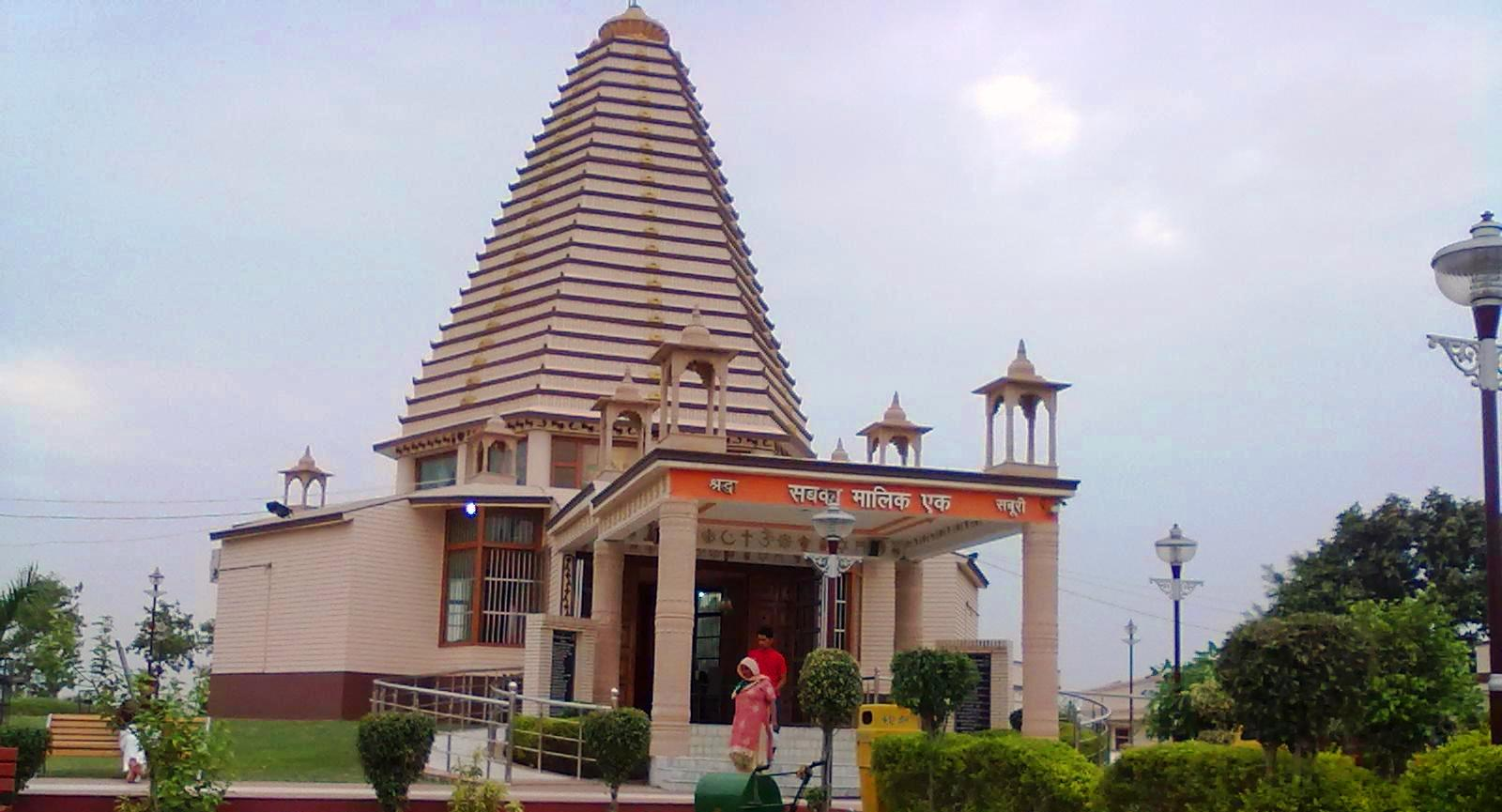
Sai Mandir

- Medieval Times

A centuries-old fort was situated at Rohtak, in present-day Qilla Mohallah. That fort was built by Sheikhs of Yemen under Qazi Sultan Muhammad Surkh Zulqarni during Ghauri Dynasty kings. The then Delhi emperor Mahmud Tughlaq posted two brothers, Malik Idrees and Mubariz Khan at that fort in 1400. The fort of Rohtak was besieged by Syed Khizer Khan in 1410 which could only succeed after a long seizure lasting six months.

- British period (1800-1947)

Rohtak is among the oldest organised districts of Haryana; the British officers used to reside here since 1810. Those British constructed a Church at Rohtak, which was completed in 1867. It was named as All Saints Church. Its central hall was built by Maj. Feindala in the memory of his daughter Athel Nora, while the contribution for woodwork was given by JF Bruster and RF Kalenal. There are some tombstones, having dated inscriptions in the graveyard near mini secretariat building of Rohtak. Previously it was said to be surrounded by a garden, but now only a narrow strip of land is left for this cemetery. It has some 180-year-old historic tombstones, including one identified to be that of DC Moore. This centuries old cemetery is currently in a deserted condition and a thick thorny vegetation growth has covered the tombs stones there.

== Transportation ==
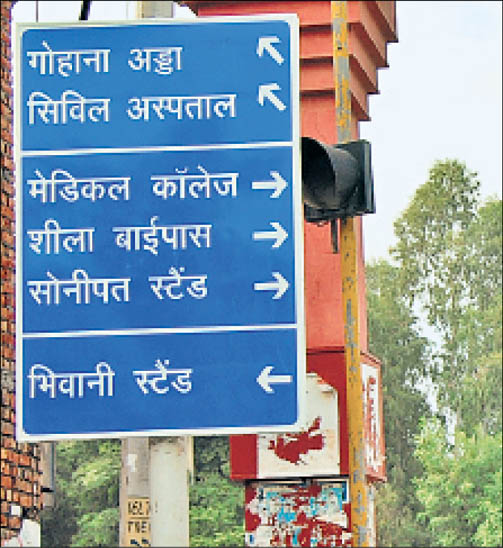
View of Latest Sign-Board

=== Roads ===
Rohtak is connected to seven cities by three national highways NH 9, NH 709, NH 352 (old NH 10, NH71, and NH71A) and two State Highways (SH16 and SH18). National Highway 9 from New Delhi to Rohtak is upgraded to six lanes with 30 km Rohtak City Bypass, so that the vehicles travelling between New Delhi and Hisar do not have to enter Rohtak city. National Highway 9 from Rohtak to Hissar and several cities of Punjab is being widened to a four-lane highway.

==== National highway ====
Three National Highways, NH-9 (Malaut, Punjab to Askot in Uttarakhand), NH-709 (Rajgarh, Haryana to Panipat, Haryana) and NH-352 (Narwana to Rewari) pass through the city. Rohtak is connected to Delhi through NH-9, and currently the road is being widened to six lanes by NHAI, with the plans to develop the entire corridor as an industrial area. NH-352 From Rewari to Rohtak is 4 lanes, and NH-709 from Rohtak to Panipat is 4 lanes.

=== Railway ===
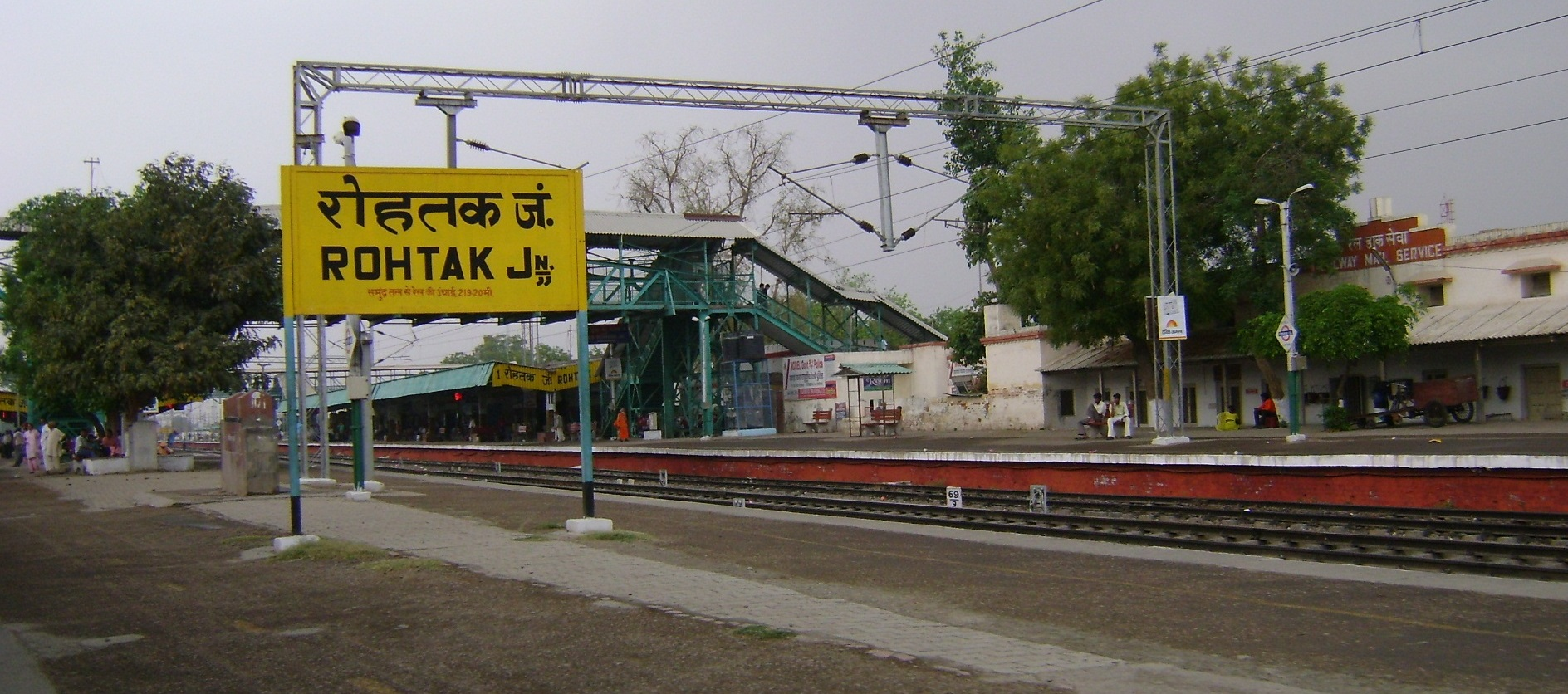
Rohtak railway station

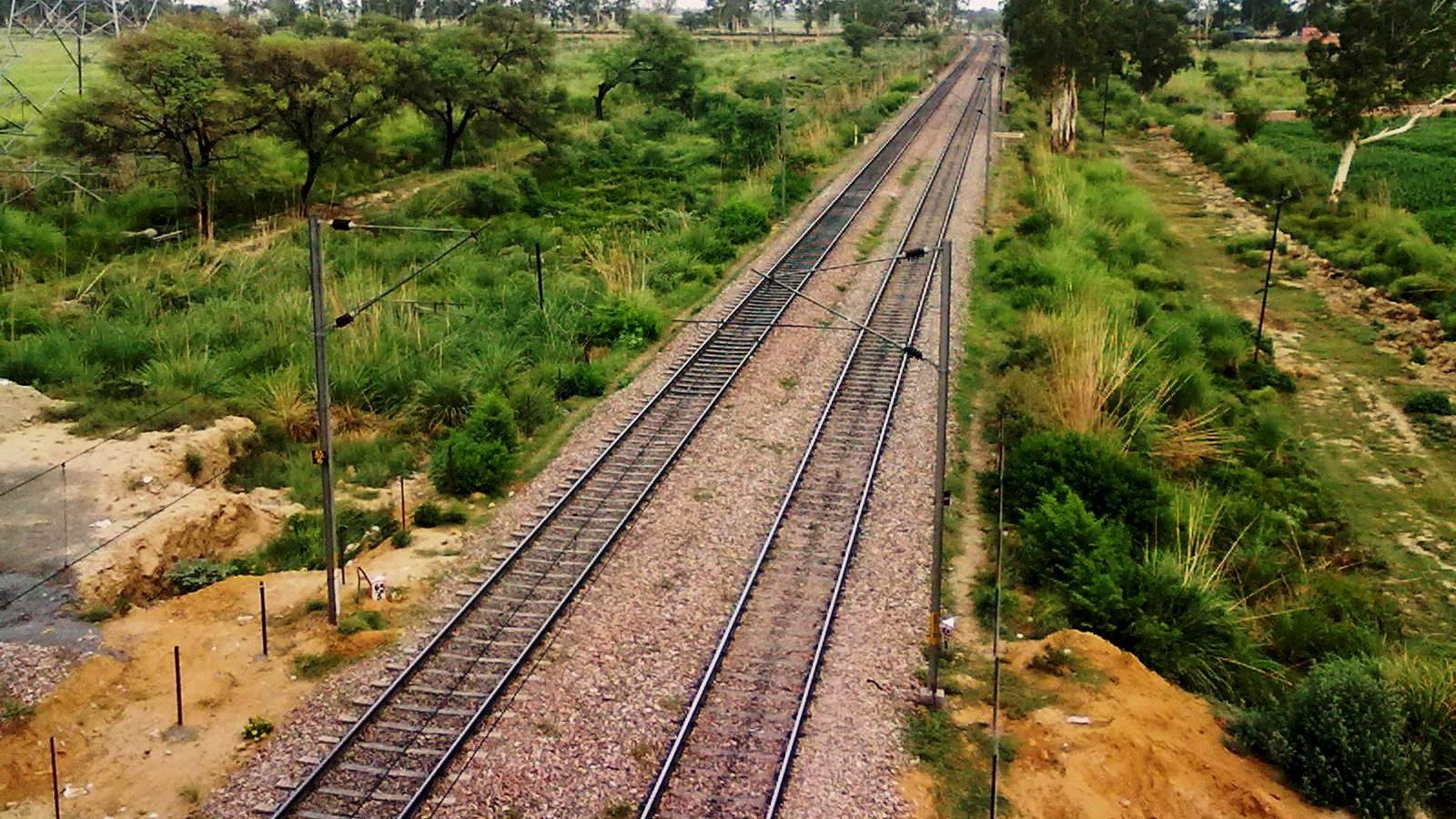
Delhi rohtak railway line

Rohtak City has a railway junction with connections to Delhi, Panipat, Rewari, Bhiwani and Jind converging on the city. Rohtak is connected to Bahadurgarh through Delhi line, to Gohana through Panipat line and Jhajjar through Rewari line. Delhi and Jind connections are part of the Delhi-Fazilka line, and the line is double tracked from Delhi to Bhatinda, Punjab, India, and is electrified between Delhi and Bhatinda. All other lines are single track and electrified i.e. Rohtak Rewari Line, Rohtak Hisar Line (via Bhiwani).

Rohtak Junction railway station is served by three Shatabdi Express services (New Delhi Moga Shatabdi Express, New Delhi–Firozpur Shatabdi Express and New Delhi Ludhiana Shatabdi Express) and Ajmer Chandigarh Garib Rath Express.

The railway track between New Delhi and Rohtak has been electrified. EMU services has been running between the two cities since March 2013.

=== Air travel ===
There is currently no commercial airport serving the city. The state govt has shown interests in building a Greenfield Cargos Airport at the Meham town to serve this city and the AAI has given consent in principle for this. The nearest International Airport is Indira Gandhi International Airport at Delhi approx.72 km.

== Education ==
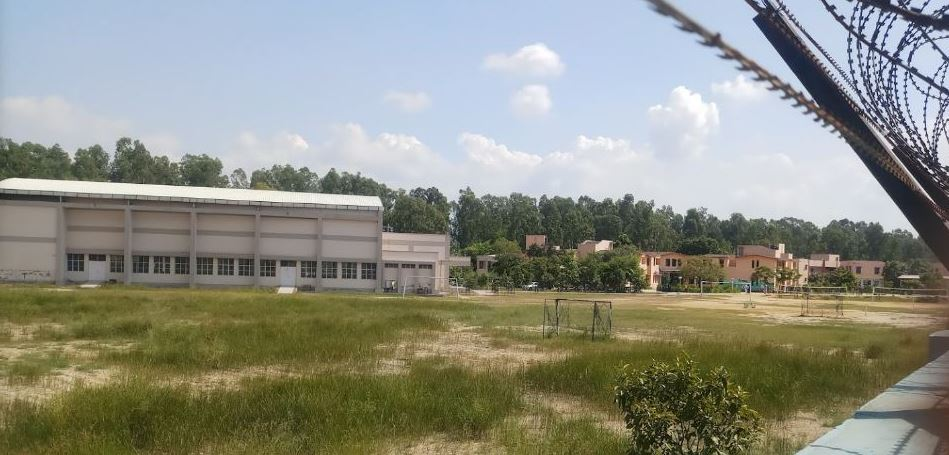
Kendriya Vidyalaya Rohtak campus

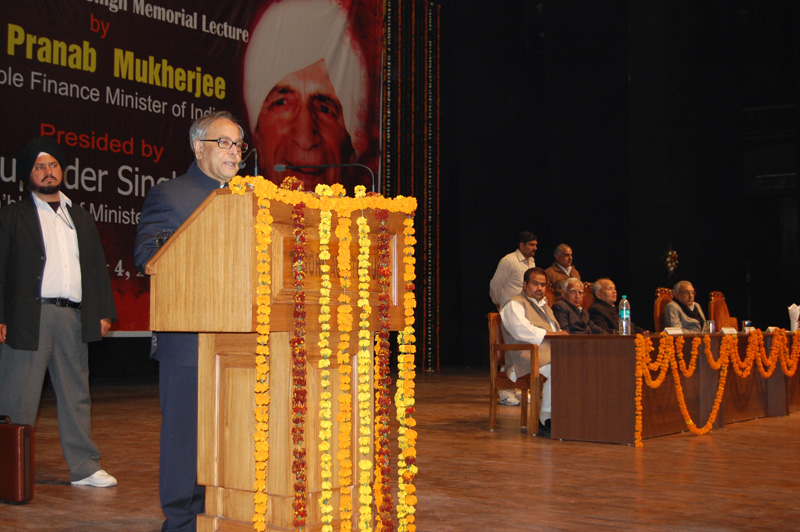
The former President of India Mr. Mukherjee Addressing an Event At MDU

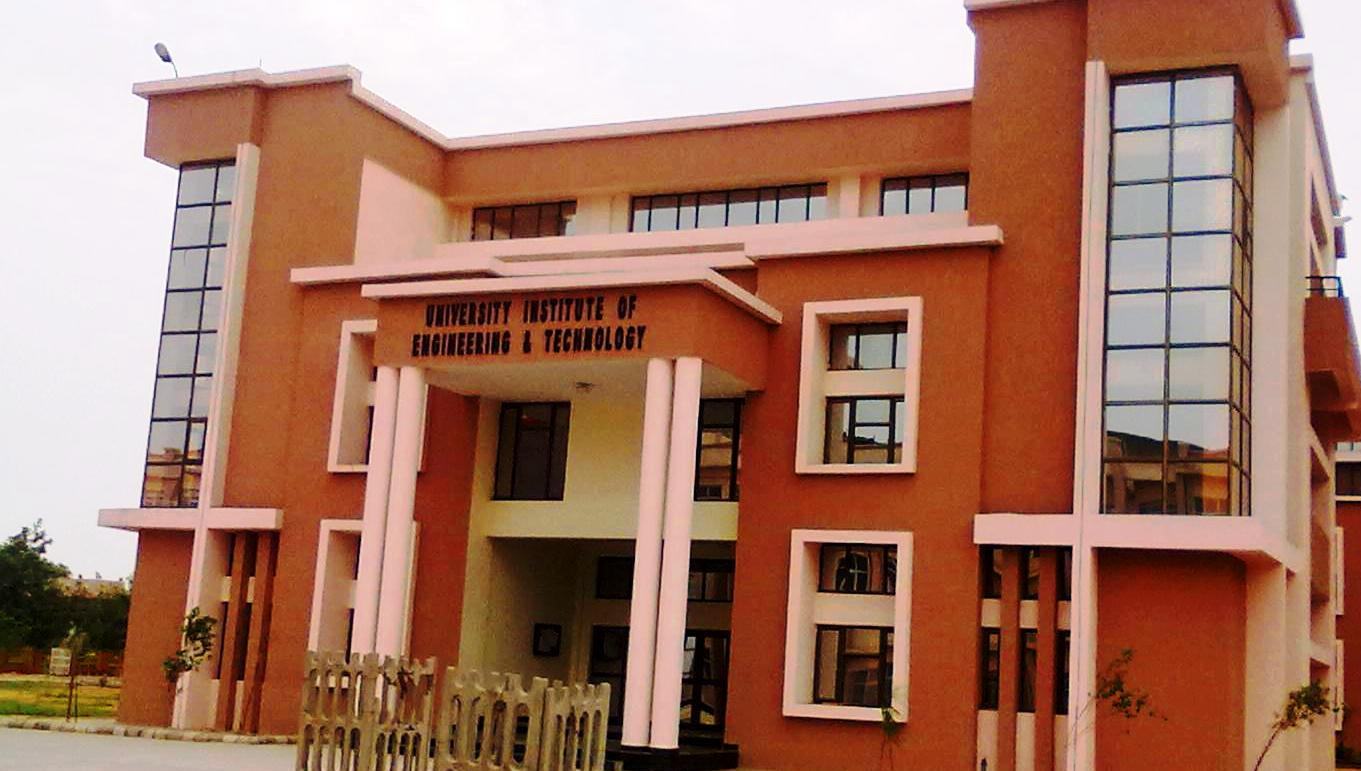
Institute of Engineering and Tech. at Maharishi Dayanand University

- Indian Institute of Management Rohtak is among the top management institutes in India and is positioned as analytics hub in India.
- Indian Institute of Technology Delhi extension campus also being set up with a budget of Rs 50 crore.
- Pandit Bhagwat Dayal Sharma Post Graduate Institute of Medical Sciences is a government medical institution established in 1960. As of 2009, it was proposed to be upgraded to the level of AIIMS.
- State Institute of Film and Television, a film school under the State University of Performing And Visual Arts, established in 2011.

=== List of universities in Rohtak ===
- Baba Mastnath University, private university established in 2012
- Maharshi Dayanand University, established in 1976 and named after the saint Dayananda Saraswati

== Media and communications ==
All India Radio has a local station in Rohtak which transmits various programs of mass interest.

== Sport ==
The Haryana Urban Development Authority (HUDA) has developed the Rajiv Gandhi Sports Complex in Sector-6 which was completed in 2012. The complex includes cricket, hockey and football facilities, tennis courts, an athletics stadium, wrestling hall, swimming pools and other leisure facilities. An athletic pavilion has also been constructed at the sports complex. The pavilion has a height of 100 feet and it has a capacity to accommodate 8000 spectators. A synthetic track has also been constructed in front of the pavilion for warming up of athletes. Apart from this, three earthen mounts have been developed on international standard and these would provide seating capacity for 22,000 spectators. Therefore, in all, a total of 30,000 spectators would be able to view the sports activities in this sports complex.

Chaudhary Bansi Lal Cricket Stadium is a cricket ground in the Lahli, Rohtak (Haryana). The Stadium can accommodate only 8,000 spectators. The ground came into the limelight when Sachin Tendulkar played his last Ranji match in October 2013

== Notable individuals ==
- Mahant Balaknath, chancellor of Baba Mastnath University in Rohtak
- Mike Calvert, British Army officer who was involved in special operations in Burma during the Second World War was born in Rohtak in 1913.
- Rafi Muhammad Chaudhry, nuclear scientist from Indian sub continent AMU Alumni, Rutherford's PhD student and Pakistani scientist
- Manushi Chhillar, Miss World 2017, model and actress
- Anand Singh Dangi, ex. MLA Meham
- Manish Grover, MLA and politician
- Abdul Hafiz (VC) was the youngest Indian Victoria Cross holder, he came from Kalanaur village, Rohtak
- Bhupinder Singh Hooda, former Chief Minister of Haryana
- Deepender Singh Hooda, politician
- Ranbir Singh Hooda, freedom fighter and politician
- Randeep Hooda, Bollywood actor
- Balraj Kundu, ex. MLA Meham
- Sakshi Malik, Bronze Medalist - Women's 58 kg Freestyle Wrestling at 2016 Rio Summer Olympics
- Himanshu Nandal, para swimmer
- Amit Panghal, Asian Games Gold Medalist in Light Flyweight Men's Boxing
- Chhotu Ram, politician in Punjab and co-founder of the National Unionist Party, social worker
- Dhruv Rathee, Indian YouTuber.
- Major Mohit Sharma, Indian Soldier 1 Para SF, AC SM
- Karambir Singh, 24th Chief of the Naval Staff (CNS) of the Indian Navy.
- Shafali Verma, Indian women's cricketer and captain of the 2023 Under-19 Women's T20 World Cup winning team.

== See also ==
- Bahadurgarh
- Gurgaon
- Faridabad
- Kahni
- Sonepat
- Moradabad
- Jind
- Gohana
- Bhiwani
