= Baba Mastnath University =

Private university in Haryana, India

- Other name: BMU
- Type: Private
- Established: 10 February 2012
- Academic affiliations: UGC
- Chancellor: Mahant Balaknath
- Vice-Chancellor: B. M. Yadav
- Students: 10000
- Location: Rohtak, Haryana, 121021, India; 28.8749°N 76.6446°E
- Campus: Rural
- Website: bmu.ac.in

Baba Mastnath University is an Indian university located in Rohtak. It is a private self financing university. BMU is situated in Rohtak on the Delhi-Rohtak NH-10 highway.

It is also part of the Association of Indian Universities.

== Faculties at BMU ==
1. Faculty of Ayurveda
2. Faculty of Physiotherapy
3. Faculty of Nursing
4. Faculty of Sciences
5. Faculty of Pharmacy
6. Faculty of Humanities
7. Faculty of Commerce & Management
8. Faculty of Law
9. Faculty of Engineering

== Academics ==
BMU offers under graduate, post graduate and doctoral programmes for the following: Ayurveda (B.A.M.S), Physiotherapy, Nursing, Sciences, Pharmacy, Humanities, Management & Commerce, Law, Naturopathy & Yogic Sciences, Engineering, Education, Mass Media, Computer Sciences. Social Work, Medical and Para-Medical, Pharmacy, Life and Basic Sciences. The university also offers this for languages such as Hindi, Sanskrit and English.

=== Accreditation ===
Baba Mastnath University is a UGC approved University. It has been established and set up under the Haryana Private Universities Act, 2006.
