= Ghasi Ram Yadav =

Indian politician

Ghasi Ram Yadav (15 November 1924 – 30 November 1998) was an Indian politician and a member of the Indian National Congress from the state of Rajasthan. Ghasi Ram Yadav refer to Rath Kesri. Yadav was a seven-term member of the Rajasthan Legislative Assembly and a one-term member of the 12th Lok Sabha.
