= List of tehsils of Rajasthan =

List of administrative divisions of Rajasthan, India

The Indian state of Rajasthan for the administrative purpose divided into 41 districts (zila) and they are further divided into 425 Tehsils (sub districts) , 323 Sub-division Offices and 233 Sub-tehsils (as of 22 January 2026).

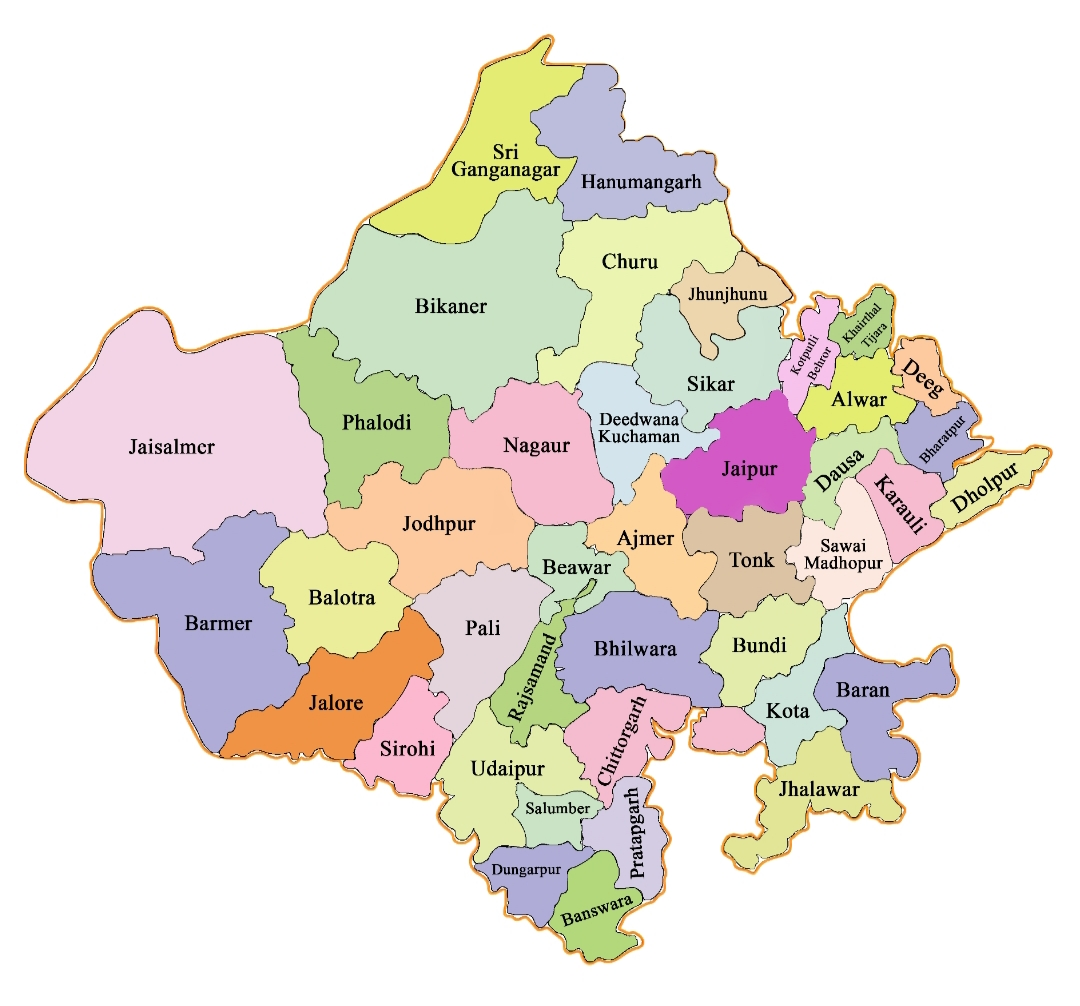
2025 Political map of Rajasthan with districts & tehsils (Note: this is outdated map of administrative units)

== Tehsil Administration in state ==
As an entity of local government, the tehsil office (panchayat samiti) exercises certain fiscal and administrative power over the villages and municipalities within its jurisdiction. It is the ultimate executive agency for land records and related administrative matters. The chief official is called the tehsildar.

Tehsils can be considered sub-districts in the Indian context. In some instances, tehsils overlap with "blocks" (panchayat union blocks or panchayat development blocks) and come under the land and revenue department, headed by tehsildar; and blocks come under the rural development department, headed by the block development officer and serve different government administrative functions over the same or similar geographical area.

== List of Tehsils ==
The total number of sub districts(Tehsils) in Rajasthan state as of 1 January 2025 is 426 and number of Up-tehsils is 232.

List of Tehsils in Rajasthan state are as follows:

District	S.No.	Tehsil	Sub-tehsils
Ajmer	1	Ajmer	Arkada, Sanadhra
Ajmer	2	Arain	
Ajmer	3	Kishangarh	
Ajmer	4	Nasirabad	Shrinagar
Ajmer	5	Peesangan	
Ajmer	6	Pushkar	
Ajmer	7	Roopangarh	
Ajmer	8	Bhinay	Devliya Kallan, Nagola, Badanwada
Ajmer	9	Kekri	Kadera, Baghera
Ajmer	10	Sarwar	Borada
Ajmer	11	Sawar	
Ajmer	12	Tantoti	
Alwar	1	Alwar	Bahadurpur, Kasba Dehra
Alwar	2	Govindgarh	
Alwar	3	Kathumar	Bhanokhar, Kherli Mandi
Alwar	4	Laxmangarh	Badoda Mev
Alwar	5	Malakhera	
Alwar	6	Naugawan	
Alwar	7	Pratapgarh	
Alwar	8	Rajgarh	
Alwar	9	Ramgarh	Shahdoli, Bamboli
Alwar	10	Reni	
Alwar	11	Tehla	
Alwar	12	Thanagazi	
Balotra	1	Baytu	
Balotra	2	Gida	Sawau Padamsingh, Hira ki Dhani
Balotra	3	Kalyanpur	
Balotra	4	Pachpadra	Jasol, Dudva
Balotra	5	Patodi	
Balotra	6	Samdari	
Balotra	7	Sindhari	
Balotra	8	Siwana	Padru
Banswara	1	Abapura	
Banswara	2	Anandpuri	
Banswara	3	Arthuna	
Banswara	4	Bagidora	
Banswara	5	Banswara	
Banswara	6	Chhoti Sarwan	
Banswara	7	Gangadtalai	
Banswara	8	Ganora	
Banswara	9	Garhi	
Banswara	10	Ghatol	
Banswara	11	Kushalgarh	
Banswara	12	Sajjangarh	
Baran	1	Anta	
Baran	2	Atru	
Baran	3	Baran	
Baran	4	Chhabra	
Baran	5	Chhipabarod	
Baran	6	Kishanganj	
Baran	7	Mangrol	
Baran	8	Shahbad	
Barmer	1	Barmer	Vishala
Barmer	2	Barmer Gramin	Chava
Barmer	3	Batadoo	
Barmer	4	Chohtan	Lilsar
Barmer	5	Dhanau	
Barmer	6	Dhorimana	
Barmer	7	Gadraroad	Harshani
Barmer	8	Gudamalani	
Barmer	9	Nokhra	
Barmer	10	Ramsar	
Barmer	11	Sedwa	Phagliyan
Barmer	12	Sheo	Bhiyad
Beawar	1	Badnor	
Beawar	2	Beawar	
Beawar	3	Jaitaran	Anandpur Kalu
Beawar	4	Masuda	
Beawar	5	Raipur	Sendara
Beawar	6	Todgarh	
Beawar	7	Bijainagar	
Bharatpur	1	Bayana	
Bharatpur	2	Bharatpur	
Bharatpur	3	Bhusawar	
Bharatpur	4	Nadbai	
Bharatpur	5	Rudawal	
Bharatpur	6	Rupbas	
Bharatpur	7	Uchchain	
Bharatpur	8	Weir	
Bhilwara	1	Antali	
Bhilwara	2	Asind	
Bhilwara	3	Bhilwara	
Bhilwara	4	Bijoliya	
Bhilwara	5	Hamirgarh	
Bhilwara	6	Hurda	
Bhilwara	7	Kareda	
Bhilwara	8	Mandal	
Bhilwara	9	Mandalgarh	
Bhilwara	10	Raipur	
Bhilwara	11	Sahara	
Bhilwara	12	Sawaipur	
Bhilwara	13	Banera	
Bhilwara	14	Jahazpur	
Bhilwara	15	Kachhola	
Bhilwara	16	Kotri	
Bhilwara	17	Phooliya Kalan	
Bhilwara	18	Shahpura	
Bikaner	1	Bajju	
Bikaner	2	Bikaner	
Bikaner	3	Chhatargarh	
Bikaner	4	Hadan	
Bikaner	5	Jasrasar	
Bikaner	6	Khajuwala	
Bikaner	7	Kolayat	
Bikaner	8	Lunkaransar	
Bikaner	9	Nokha	
Bikaner	10	Poogal	
Bikaner	11	Sridungargarh	
Bundi	1	Bundi	
Bundi	2	Hindoli	
Bundi	3	Indragarh	
Bundi	4	Keshoraipatan	
Bundi	5	Nainwa	
Bundi	6	Raithal	
Bundi	7	Talera	
Chittorgarh	1	Bari Sadri	
Chittorgarh	2	Bassi	
Chittorgarh	3	Begun	
Chittorgarh	4	Bhadesar	
Chittorgarh	5	Bhupalsagar	
Chittorgarh	6	Chittorgarh	
Chittorgarh	7	Dungla	
Chittorgarh	8	Gangrar	
Chittorgarh	9	Kapasan	
Chittorgarh	10	Nimbahera	
Chittorgarh	11	Rashmi	
Chittorgarh	12	Rawatbhata	
Churu	1	Bhanipura	
Churu	2	Bidasar	
Churu	3	Churu	
Churu	4	Rajaldesar	
Churu	5	Rajgarh	
Churu	6	Ratangarh	
Churu	7	Sardarshahar	
Churu	8	Sidhmukh	
Churu	9	Sujangarh	
Churu	10	Taranagar	
Dausa	1	Bahrawanda	
Dausa	2	Baijupara	
Dausa	3	Bandikui	
Dausa	4	Baswa	
Dausa	5	Bhandarej	
Dausa	6	Dausa	
Dausa	7	Kundal	
Dausa	8	Lalsot	
Dausa	9	Lawan	
Dausa	10	Mahwa	
Dausa	11	Mandawar	
Dausa	12	Nangal Rajawatan	
Dausa	13	Nirjharna	
Dausa	14	Paparda	
Dausa	15	Rahuwas	
Dausa	16	Ramgarh Pachwara	
Dausa	17	Sainthal	
Dausa	18	Sikrai	
Deeg	1	Deeg	
Deeg	2	Janoothar	
Deeg	3	Jurhara	
Deeg	4	Kaman	
Deeg	5	Kumher	
Deeg	6	Nagar	
Deeg	7	Pahari	
Deeg	8	Rarah	
Deeg	9	Sikri	
Dholpur	1	Bari	
Dholpur	2	Basai Nawab	
Dholpur	3	Baseri	
Dholpur	4	Dholpur	
Dholpur	5	Maniya	
Dholpur	6	Rajakhera	
Dholpur	7	Sarmathura	
Dholpur	8	Sepau	
Didwana-Kuchaman	1	Chhoti Khatoo	
Didwana-Kuchaman	2	Didwana	
Didwana-Kuchaman	3	Kuchaman City	Chitawa
Didwana-Kuchaman	4	Ladnu	Nimbi Jodha, Mithri
Didwana-Kuchaman	5	Makrana	Gachchipura, Budsoo
Didwana-Kuchaman	6	Maulasar	Dindarpura
Didwana-Kuchaman	7	Nawa	Maroth, Lunwa
Didwana-Kuchaman	8	Parbatsar	Pilwa, Bhakari, Badoo
Dungarpur	1	Aspur	
Dungarpur	2	Bichhiwara	
Dungarpur	3	Chikhali	
Dungarpur	4	Dovda	
Dungarpur	5	Dungarpur	
Dungarpur	6	Galiyakot	
Dungarpur	7	Gamri Ahara	
Dungarpur	8	Jhonthripal	
Dungarpur	9	Obri	
Dungarpur	10	Paldewal	
Dungarpur	11	Sabla	
Dungarpur	12	Sagwara	
Dungarpur	13	Simalwara	
Ganganagar	1	Anupgarh	
Ganganagar	2	Gajsinghpur	
Ganganagar	3	Ganganagar	Hindumalkot, Mirzawala, Chunawadh
Ganganagar	4	Gharsana	
Ganganagar	5	Karanpur	Kesrisinghpur
Ganganagar	6	Padampur	Binjhbayla, Ridmalsar
Ganganagar	7	Raisinghnagar	Muklawa (17TK), Sameja (15 PTD)
Ganganagar	8	Rawla	365Head (2KLD)
Ganganagar	9	Sadulshahar	Lalgarh jattan
Ganganagar	10	Suratgarh	Rajiasar station
Ganganagar	11	Vijainagar	Jetsar
Hanumangarh	1	Bhadra	Chanibadi, Dungrana
Hanumangarh	2	Hanumangarh	Dablirathan, Norangdrsar
Hanumangarh	3	Nohar	Ramgarh, Khuiya, Fefana
Hanumangarh	4	Pallu	
Hanumangarh	5	Pilibanga	Goluwala
Hanumangarh	6	Rawatsar	
Hanumangarh	7	Sangaria	Dhaban
Hanumangarh	8	Tibbi	Talwara Jheel
Jaipur	1	Dudu	Sakhoon
Jaipur	2	Mauzamabad	Bichoon
Jaipur	3	Phagi	Nimera
Jaipur	4	Amber	Chandawaji
Jaipur	5	Jaipur	
Jaipur	6	Kalwar	
Jaipur	7	Sanganer	Bagroo
Jaipur	8	Andhi	
Jaipur	9	Bassi	
Jaipur	10	Chaksu	
Jaipur	11	Chomu	Govindgarh, Khejroli
Jaipur	12	Jalsu	Mundota
Jaipur	13	Jamwaramgarh	Tala
Jaipur	14	Jobner	
Jaipur	15	Kishangarh Renwal	
Jaipur	16	Kotkhawda	Dehlala
Jaipur	17	Madhorajpura	Renwal Manjhi
Jaipur	18	Phulera (Hq. Sambhar)	
Jaipur	19	Rampura Dabri	
Jaipur	20	Shahpura	Amarsar, Manoharpur
Jaipur	21	Toonga	
Jaisalmer	1	Bhaniyana	
Jaisalmer	2	Fatehgarh	Jhinjhinyali
Jaisalmer	3	Jaisalmer	Mohangarh, Chandhan
Jaisalmer	4	Phalsoond	
Jaisalmer	5	Pokaran	Sankada, Nachna
Jaisalmer	6	Ramgarh	
Jaisalmer	7	Sam	
Jalore	1	Ahore	
Jalore	2	Bhadrajun	
Jalore	3	Bhinmal	
Jalore	4	Jalore	
Jalore	5	Jaswantpura	Ramseen
Jalore	6	Sayala	Jiwana
Jalore	7	Bagora	
Jalore	8	Chitalwana	Khasrvi
Jalore	9	Raniwara	
Jalore	10	Sanchore	
Jhalawar	1	Aklera	
Jhalawar	2	Asnawar	
Jhalawar	3	Bakani	
Jhalawar	4	Dag	
Jhalawar	5	Gangdhar	
Jhalawar	6	Jhalrapatan	
Jhalawar	7	Khanpur	Sarola Kalan
Jhalawar	8	Manohar Thana	
Jhalawar	9	Pachpahar	
Jhalawar	10	Pirawa	
Jhalawar	11	Raipur	
Jhalawar	12	Sunel	
Jhunjhunu	1	Bissau	
Jhunjhunu	2	Buhana	Singhana
Jhunjhunu	3	Chirawa	Mandrela
Jhunjhunu	4	Gudhagorji	
Jhunjhunu	5	Jhunjhunu	
Jhunjhunu	6	Malsisar	
Jhunjhunu	7	Mandawa	
Jhunjhunu	8	Nawalgarh	Mukundgarh
Jhunjhunu	9	Pilani	Babai
Jhunjhunu	10	Surajgarh	
Jhunjhunu	11	Khetri	
Jhunjhunu	12	Udaipurwati	Gudha
Jodhpur	1	Jodhpur	Dangiyawas
Jodhpur	2	Balesar	Agolai
Jodhpur	3	Baori	
Jodhpur	4	Bhopalgarh	Asop
Jodhpur	5	Bilara	
Jodhpur	6	Chamu	
Jodhpur	7	Jhanwar	
Jodhpur	8	Kudi Bhagtasni	
Jodhpur	9	Luni	Gudha Vishnoiyan
Jodhpur	10	Osian	
Jodhpur	11	Pipar City	Borunda
Jodhpur	12	Sekhala	
Jodhpur	13	Shergarh	
Jodhpur	14	Tinwari	
Karauli	1	Nadoti	Gudha Chandarji
Karauli	2	Balghat	
Karauli	3	Todabhim	
Karauli	4	Hindaun	Katkar
Karauli	5	Karauli	Kailadevi
Karauli	6	Mandrayal	
Karauli	7	Masalpur	
Karauli	8	Sapotra	Karanpur, Kudgaon
Karauli	9	Shrimahaveer Ji	
Karauli	10	Suroth	Sherpur
Khairthal-Tijara	1	Harsoli	
Khairthal-Tijara	2	Khairthal	
Khairthal-Tijara	3	Kishangarhbas	
Khairthal-Tijara	4	Kotkasim	
Khairthal-Tijara	5	Mundawar	
Khairthal-Tijara	6	Tapukara	
Khairthal-Tijara	7	Tijara	
Kota	1	Chechat	
Kota	2	Digod	Sultanpur
Kota	3	Kanwas	
Kota	4	Ladpura	Mandana
Kota	5	Pipalda	Khantoli
Kota	6	Ramganj Mandi	
Kota	7	Sangod	Bapawar
Kotputli-Behror	1	Bansur	
Kotputli-Behror	2	Behror	
Kotputli-Behror	3	Kotputli	
Kotputli-Behror	4	Mandhan	
Kotputli-Behror	5	Narayanpur	
Kotputli-Behror	6	Neemrana	
Kotputli-Behror	7	Paota	
Kotputli-Behror	8	Viratnagar	
Nagaur	1	Degana	
Nagaur	2	Deh	
Nagaur	3	Jayal	
Nagaur	4	Khinvsar	Panchodi
Nagaur	5	Merta	Gotan
Nagaur	6	Mundwa	
Nagaur	7	Nagaur	Jodhiyasi, Shribalaji
Nagaur	8	Riyan Bari	Bherunda
Nagaur	9	Sanjoo	
Pali	1	Bali	Nana, Beda
Pali	2	Desuri	
Pali	3	Marwar Junction	
Pali	4	Pali	
Pali	5	Rani	Khiwada
Pali	6	Rohat	Jaitpur
Pali	7	Sojat	Bagdi
Pali	8	Sumerpur	Takhatgarh
Phalodi	1	Aau	
Phalodi	2	Bap	Shekhasar, Nokh
Phalodi	3	Bapini	Matoda
Phalodi	4	Dechu	Peelwa
Phalodi	5	Ghantiyali	
Phalodi	6	Lohawat	
Phalodi	7	Phalodi	
Phalodi	8	Setrawa	
Pratapgarh	1	Arnod	
Pratapgarh	2	Chhoti Sadri	
Pratapgarh	3	Dalot	
Pratapgarh	4	Dhariawad	Mungana
Pratapgarh	5	Peepalkhoont	
Pratapgarh	6	Pratapgarh	Devgarh, Dhamotar
Pratapgarh	7	Suhagpura	
Rajsamand	1	Amet	
Rajsamand	2	Bhim	Diwair
Rajsamand	3	Delwara	
Rajsamand	4	Deogarh	
Rajsamand	5	Garhbor	
Rajsamand	6	Khamnor	
Rajsamand	7	Kumbhalgarh	
Rajsamand	8	Kunwariya	
Rajsamand	9	Nathdwara	
Rajsamand	10	Railmagra	Gilund
Rajsamand	11	Rajsamand	
Rajsamand	12	Sardargarh	
Salumbar	1	Jhallara	
Salumbar	2	Lasadiya	
Salumbar	3	Salumbar	Gingla
Salumbar	4	Sarada	Jaisamand
Salumbar	5	Semari	
Sawai Madhopur	1	Bamanwas	Bhanwara
Sawai Madhopur	2	Barnala	
Sawai Madhopur	3	Gangapur	
Sawai Madhopur	4	Talawara	
Sawai Madhopur	5	Wazeerpur	
Sawai Madhopur	6	Bonli	
Sawai Madhopur	7	Chauth Ka Barwara	
Sawai Madhopur	8	Khandar	Bahrawanda Kallan
Sawai Madhopur	9	Malarna Doongar	Malarna Chaur
Sawai Madhopur	10	Mitrapura	
Sawai Madhopur	11	Sawai Madhopur	Todra
Sikar	1	Neem Ka Thana	
Sikar	2	Patan	
Sikar	3	Shrimadhopur	Ajitgarh
Sikar	4	Danta Ramgarh	Palsana, Losal
Sikar	5	Dhod	
Sikar	6	Fatehpur	
Sikar	7	Khandela	
Sikar	8	Laxmangarh	
Sikar	9	Nechhwa	
Sikar	10	Ramgarh Shekhawati	
Sikar	11	Reengus	
Sikar	12	Sikar	
Sikar	13	Sikar Gramin	
Sirohi	1	Abu Road	
Sirohi	2	Deldar	
Sirohi	3	Pindwara	Bhanwari
Sirohi	4	Reodar	Mandar
Sirohi	5	Sheoganj	Kailashnagar
Sirohi	6	Sirohi	Kalindri
Tonk	1	Todaraisingh	
Tonk	2	Aligarh	
Tonk	3	Deoli	Nasirda
Tonk	4	Dooni	
Tonk	5	Malpura	Diggi
Tonk	6	Nagarfort	Dhunwa Kallan
Tonk	7	Newai	Dattwas, Siras
Tonk	8	Peeplu	Ranoli
Tonk	9	Tonk	Barwas
Tonk	10	Uniara	Banetha, Sop
Udaipur	1	Badgaon	
Udaipur	2	Barapal	
Udaipur	3	Bhinder	Kheroda
Udaipur	4	Ghasa	
Udaipur	5	Girwa	
Udaipur	6	Gogunda	
Udaipur	7	Jhadol	Ogana
Udaipur	8	Kanod	
Udaipur	9	Kherwara	Bawalwara
Udaipur	10	Kotra	Merpur Hq Devla
Udaipur	11	Kurabar	
Udaipur	12	Mavli	Sanwar
Udaipur	13	Nayagaon	Kanbai
Udaipur	14	Phalasiyan	
Udaipur	15	Rishabhdeo	Kalyanpur
Udaipur	16	Sayra	
Udaipur	17	Vallabhnagar	
Grand Total	426		

== See also ==
- Government of Rajasthan
- List of districts of Rajasthan
- List of urban local bodies in Rajasthan
- Rajasthan Administrative Service
