= Nayagaon =

Nayagaon may refer to:

- Nayagaon, Bihar, a census town in Bihar, India
  - Nayagaon railway station
- Nayagaon, Mawal, Pune district, Maharashtra, India
- Nayagaon, Rajasthan, a village in Rajasthan, India
- Nayagaon, Punjab, a small town in Punjab, India
- Nayagaon, Madhya Pradesh, a village in Madhya Pradesh, India
