= Jalsoo =

Village in Jaipur (Rajasthan), India

Jalsoo (also Jalsu) is a village, Tehsil (sub district) and Panchayat Samiti located in Jaipur Rural district of Rajasthan state, India. It belongs to Jaipur Division. It is located 33 KM towards north from district headquarters and state capital, Jaipur. Jalsoo Pin code is 303701 and postal head office is Jahota. Rampura Dabri is the nearby village and Tehsil of Jalsoo.

== See also ==
- Rampura Dabri
- Outline of Rajasthan
- List of tehsils of Rajasthan
- List of districts of Rajasthan
- List of cities and towns in Rajasthan
- List of urban local bodies in Rajasthan
