= Semli Kalyan =

- Village
- Location in Rajasthan, India Semli Kalyan (India)
- Coordinates: 24°36′34″N 76°17′50″E
- Country: India
- State: Rajasthan
- District: Jhalawar

Government
  - Type: Sarpanch

Area
  - Total: 369 ha (910 acres)
- Elevation: 329 m (1,079 ft)

Population (2021)
  - Total: 715
  - Density: 194/km^{2} (502/sq mi)

Languages
  - Official: Hindi
- Time zone: UTC+5:30 (IST)
- Postal code: 326036
- Area code: 07434
- Vehicle registration: RJ17

Semli Kalyan is a village in Raipur Tehsil in the Indian State of Rajasthan. It is a very old village with limited population and area. The village is administrated by a sarpanch. Semli Kalyan depends on Raipur, the nearest town, for major economic activities. Semli Kalyan is surrounded by two small lakes.

The village has an uninterrupted 24 hours electric supply from a power grid. There are Many villagers that went for higher education and are serving the nation in different areas, also many villagers works in nearby cities.

Short film ABHISHAAP shooting was done in this ancient village for social awareness.

== Geography ==
The area of Semli Kalyan is divided into 155.13 irrigated hectares, 111.34 unirrigated hectares, 33.94 hectares under culturable waste (including gauchar and groves), and the remaining 68.3 hectares not available for cultivation.

== Demographics ==
As per Census 2011, the village had a population of 737 and administration over 181 houses.

Semli Kalyan has 105 children, 51 boys and 54 girls.

== Infrastructure ==
Houses are connected to basic amenities such as water, electricity, and telephones.

== Health care ==
Village hosts a small hospital near 1 km, and 3 major hospitals in nearby towns.

== Education ==
As per last census, 492 people are illiterate or primary educated (around 66%), mostly seniors. The younger generations are educated.

Semli Kalyan has the following educational facilities:

- Upper Primary school (Operated by Rajasthan Govt, Dept of Education)
- Primary school (Private)
- 4 Colleges in the nearby range - Medical College, Engineering college, Woman's College, and PG College

== Employment ==
The primary occupation is self employed farming. 435 people are Employed (230 male, 205 female).
