= Istimrari =

Historical Indian governance jurisdiction

Istimrari estates were small feudal states in 17th- and 18th-century Rajputana. (Note: Rajputana is the historic, pre-1949, name for the region of the Indian, or South Asian, subcontinent, that encompassed most of the present-day Indian state of Rājasthān, the largest state of the Republic of India, parts of other northwest Indian states of Madhya Pradesh and Gujarat, and some adjoining areas of Sindh, now part of modern-day Pakistan.) The istimrari chieftains, the istimrardars, paid tribute to their Maratha masters, but were not compelled to participate in wars unless called upon by their respective chiefs. Part of the Indian feudal system of the time, there were sixty-six istimararis in the Ajmer region of Rajputana. A related land estate existed alongside the istimraris in Rajputana: Bhum were Rajput-specific land rights, granted as allodial titles, which were freely inheritable and inalienable by the original proprietor or the government. Although smaller estates, titles to bhums were highly valued even by istimrardars and higher chiefs.

== System ==
The istimarari estates were originally only jagirs, which were held under obligation of military service. The Marathas, however, who found it impolitic to encourage the warlike tendencies of their Rajput vassals, commuted this obligation to a fixed tribute.

The istimrari chieftains, accordingly, acquired the status of holders at a fixed and permanent quit-rent. Although during the earlier period of British rule extra cesses were levied from time to time, in 1841 the government remitted all such collections (fees) for the future. In 1873 sanads (written grant or deed) were granted to the various istimrardars, declaring their existing assessments to be fixed in perpetuity. There was, however, a special duty (nazardna) or quasi-inheritance tax, payable on successions, its amount being separately stipulated in each sanad.

=== Tazimi istimrardars ===
There were altogether sixty-six istimrari estates in the Ajmer region. These were divided into tazimi (from Urdu: تعظیم, romanized: ta'zīm, borrowed from Arabic: تعظيم, lit. 'honour, respect'), belonging to the aristocracy of the province and non-tazimi, being those held by persons of lesser status.

The tazimi istimrari numbered sixteen and were:

- Bhinai
- Sawar
- Masuda
- Pisangan
- Junia
- Deolia
- Kharwa
- Bandanwara
- Mehrun
- Para
- Kerote
- Deogaon-Baghera
- Gobindgarh
- Tantuti (Tantoti)
- Barli
- Bagsuri

== Bhum estates ==
An ancient type of land tenure peculiar to the Rajputs was the bhum. The word itself means 'land' and bhumiā or bhumiya signifies the holder of this type of land title. As an allodial title, a bhum tenure is held as a right "of the soil", and so free from feudal obligations. The tenure consisted essentially in a hereditary, non-resumable, and inalienable right in the land. The bhum title was so valued that the greatest chiefs were solicitous to obtain it: Even when held on land in villages entirely dependent on their authority as the presiding istimrardars, thakurs, or rajas, bhums were desirable for these higher-level chiefs. The titles were thus sought after and carefully retained for locales contained within areas already under their rule, as well as for those outside their territorial jurisdiction. For example, the Maharaja of Kishangarh State, and the thakurs of Fatehgarh (in Kishangarh), of Junia, of Bandanwara, and of Tantoti (all three in Jodhpur State, also called the Kingdom of Marwar), were among the bhumiyas of Ajmer.

The obligations of bhumiyas were traditionally threefold:

- To protect the village in which the bhum is, and the village cattle, from robbers;
- To protect the property of travellers within the village from theft and robbery; and
- To compensate sufferers from a crime which should have been prevented.

Except in cases where the bhumiya was also a Raja or istimrardar the bhum property title passed to all children equally, not solely in the male line or by birth order. The bhum survived into the era of the British Raj, and there were 109 bhum estates recorded in Ajmer in 1908. A precedent set in English courts in the early 19th century maintained the inviolability of bhum titles even from the British colonial government.
