= Bandanwara =

Istimrari in Ajmer

Badanwara was an istimrari in Ajmer that belonged to the Rathore clan of Rajputs.

== Description ==
The estate was located 14 miles south of Nasirabad. It consisted of twenty-one villages. It covered an area of 34,845 bighas (approximately 21,603.90 acres).

== History ==
Mokal Singh, the Maharana of Mewar, is said to have taken Ajmer and Sambhar from the Sultan of Delhi, and he granted the village of Badanwara for the maintenance of a temple of Eklingji. Chandra Sen, an ancestor of the Rao of Badanwara, succeeded his father, Maldeo, as the Rao of Marwar. He refused to acknowledge Akbar’s suzerainty and was ousted from Jodhpur by his son Udai Singh. He attempted to recover Jodhpur but failed, and thereafter resorted to pillaging in areas acquired by the Mughal armies. A grandson of Karma Sen, through his son Ugar Sen (also known as Agar Sen), came to Ajmer and was received with a feast by a Bhil who held eighty-four villages, including Bhinai. However, Karma Sen killed his host and took possession of his host’s property. Akbar later confirmed Karma Sen in this possession.

The estate of Bhinai was partitioned several times, and in one generation from the founder of that estate came Udai Bhan. He granted three villages of the estate to his adopted son, Narsingh Das, for his maintenance. After his demise, his biological sons, Kesri Singh and Suraj Mal, quarrelled, and the estate of Bhinai was partitioned. Suraj Mal received ten villages in his appanage and subsequently founded Bandanwara in 1667.

== Rulers ==
Name (Birth – Death)	Term of office		Note(s)	Reference
Name (Birth – Death)	Start date	End date	Note(s)	Reference
Suraj Mal I			He went to Delhi and entered the service of Aurangzeb in 1659. He rendered valuable military service and was granted the mansab of 3,500 hazari along with an elephant. Aurangzeb had Suraj Mal's paternal estate of Bhinai partitioned between him and his brothers. Aurangzeb also granted him Ramsar and Srinagar as jagir. These two were, however, later taken away by Ajit Singh of Jodhpur, as the Thakur of Bandanwara did not go in Peshwai.	
Amar Singh			He retained Bandanwara, and his younger brothers received Padlan, Jaola, Kalyanpura, Jotayan, and Amargarh. Jaola reverted to Bandanwara when its Thakur, Lakshman Singh, died without an heir.	
Bahadur Singh				
Akhay Singh				
Abhay Singh				
Pratap Singh				
Suraj Mal II				
Ranjit Singh (? – 1894)		1894	His original name was Bharat Singh, and when he succeeded in Bandanwara by adoption from Kalyanpura to Suraj Mal II, he was renamed Ranjit Singh. He received the title of Rao as a personal distinction in 1877 and served as an Honorary Magistrate and Munsif within the limits of his own estate.	
Gaj Singh (1871 – 1916)	1894	1916	Educated at Mayo College in Ajmer.	
Rameshwar Singh (1904 – 1935)	1916	1935	Educated at Mayo College in Ajmer.	
Chandra Singh	1935	1948		
Harendra Singh				
