= Gehoon Kheri =

Gehoon Kheri is a village located in the taluk of Bakani, district of Jhalawar, in the State of Rajasthan in India. The village is near Aklera town which is situated at an altitude of 469 meters. The village's history spans more than 700 years. The village's population is more than 5,000 as per the 2011 census.

== Location ==
Gehoon Kheri is a village in Bakani Tehsil in Jhalawar District of Rajasthan State, India. It belongs to Kota Division. It is located 44 km towards East from District headquarters Jhalawar, 30 km from Bakani, 336 km from the state capital Jaipur. Nearby villages include Baira Garh (5 km), Ametha (5 km), Methoon (6 km), Kharpa (8 km), Pachola (9 km).

Gehoon Kheri is surrounded by Jhalrapatan Tehsil towards west, Chhipabarod Tehsil towards North, Jhalawar Tehsil towards west, Khanpur Tehsil towards North. Jhalawar, Ramganj Mandi, Raghogarh-Vijaypur, Baran are the nearby cities to Gehoon Kheri.

Hindi is the local language.

== Transport ==
There is no railway station near to Gehoon Kheri. However, Kota Jn Railway Station is the nearest major railway station (122 km away). Public bus services are available within a radius of 5 km from village. Private bus services are available within the village.

=== Nearby railway stations ===
- Jhalawar City- 45 km
- Salpura- 56 km
- Chhabra Gugor- 56 km
- Jhalawar Road- 64 km
- Atru- 65 km

== People ==
The village is known for people including Shri Arun sedwal IDAS (Indian Defence & accounts Services), Shri Prabhu Singh Chaouhan who was Pradhan (Chief) of Bakani Panchayat Samiti, Shri. Satyanarayan Gandhi, Shri Radhey Shyam Sedwal, Ex-Sarapanch and Member DSO.

Major profession of the rural people is agriculture. They give their full-time in looking for crops, while women helping them in ploughing, and other farming work. The villagers cultivate wheat, coriander, gram, garlic, kilonji, soya bean, and millet as seasonal crops. Jhalawar district is known for the highest rainfall in the Rajasthan state. The village has abundant water resources including a water canal, Chhapi Dam, which is just 3.5 km from the village with an irrigation capacity of 2918 M Cft.

== Amenities ==
The village has the following amenities: schools, bank, hospitals, dispensary and post office.

The surrounding places include Aklera, Chhapi Dam, Delhanpur, Deoli. Delhanpur is located 4 km from Gehoon Kheri and 54 km from Jhalawar. A place of antiquity with carved pillars, torans and some erotic figures in the ruins of temples scattered over an area of 2 km. It stands on the bank of river Chhapi where an irrigation dam is under construction.

== Climate ==
Summer temperatures go from 32.5 °C to 47.0 °C and winter from 9.5 °C to 2.5 °C. Average rainfall in the village is 943 mm (per year).
