= Rampura Dabri =

Tehsil, Block & District Subdivision in Rajasthan, India

Rampura Dabri रामपुरा डाबड़ी Rampura Dabdi
- Panchayat Samiti (block) & Tehsil (sub-district) & Upkhand (subdivision)
- Rampura Dabri
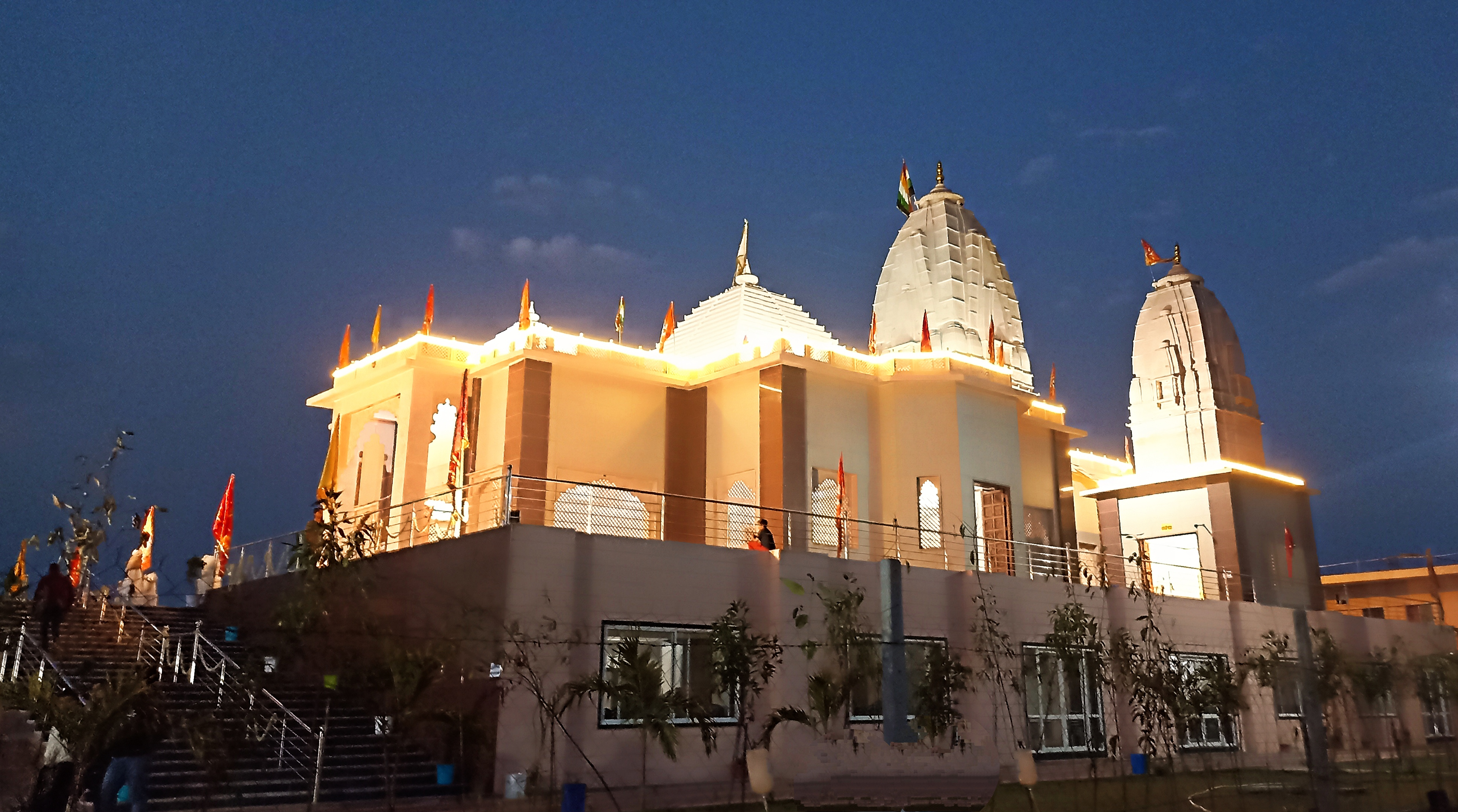
- Shree Pardeshwar Mahadev Dham, Rampura Dabri

- Location in Rajasthan, India Rampura Dabri (India)
- Coordinates: 27.10°N 75.73°E
- Country: India
- State: Rajasthan
- District: Jaipur
- Founder: unknown

Government
  - Type: Panchayat Samiti

Languages
  - Official: Dhundhari, Rajasthani, Hindi
- Time zone: UTC+5:30 (IST)
- Postal code: 303704
- ISO 3166 code: RJ-IN
- Vehicle registration: RJ 14

Rampura Dabri (also spelled as: Rampura Dabdi) is a administrative region located in the Jaipur district of Indian state of Rajasthan. According to political representation Rampura Dabri is located in Amber Assembly constituency & Jaipur Rural Lok Sabha constituency. Rampura Dabri is famous for its grand modern Hindu temples including - Shree Pardeshwar Mahadev Dham, Shri Harihar Udasin Ashram (Shiv Mandir), Laxminath Ji temple and Bajrang Bali temple. Another specialist of this area is famous Rampura Ki Petha (a famous dark brown colored sweet).

For the political representation & local administration purpose Rampura Dabri serves as the headquarter of Rampura Dabri Panchayat Samiti . Besides as Panchayat Samiti Rampura Dabri also serves as headquarter of Rampura Dabri Tehsil (sub-district) & Rampura Dabri Upkhand (subdivision) of Jaipur district.

== History (Regional, Political & Administrative) ==
=== Pre 1947 situation ===
- Founder of Rampura village (core village of Rampura Dabri region) is unknown but it exists prior to Independence of India. The Samode Thikana and Chomu Thikana hold a prominent place in the history of the Jaipur (Kingdom of Amber). They were ruled by the Nathawat clan of the Kachwaha Rajputs. Present day region and villages of Rampura Dabri were likely to be fall under its neighboring (8 KM away) Chomu Thikana rulers before the Independence of India.

=== Post 1951 situation ===
- Earliest confirmed evidence of Rampura Dabri found in 1951 census The District Census Handbook, Jaipur, Rajasthan and Ajmer (published around 1957), there are mention of two separate villages in Amber tehsil named "Rampura" & "Dabri".
- Prior to November 2025, 'Rampura-Dabri' also served as Gram Panchayat. In this Gram panchayat there were four revenue villages (gram) present namely - Rampura, Dabri, Tatiyawas & Raja Rampura. In November 2025, Government of Rajasthan did a major administrative reform work that includes creaction, abolition, merging, bifurcation, readjustment of 'Gram Panchayats & Panchayat Samitis'. In this work, existing 'Rampura-Dabri' panchayat was bifurcated into two separate gram panchayats namely - 'Rampura' (including revenue villages of Rampura & Tatiyawas) & 'Dabri/Dabdi' (including revenue villages of Dabri/Dabdi & Raja Rampura). In this administrative reform work by the government two new "panchayat Samiti" (blocks) named - Chomu & Rampura Dabri were created in Jaipur district.

=== 2023 ===
- Earlier Rampura Dabri was an Sub-tehsil of Amber tehsil. In July 2023 Government of Rajasthan upgraded existing Sub-tehsil into full fledged tehsil (sub district), following this major upgradation process Rampura Dabri was also carved out as separate Sub division (upkhand) from previous Amber sub division.

=== 2025 ===
- For the political representation & local administration purpose Rampura Dabri was created as Panchayat Samiti (block) by Government of Rajasthan on 21st November 2025 (Order No. F. 15(39)Panraj/Vidhi/Panchayat Samiti Formation/2025/829). There are 21 villages in this newly formed Panchayat Samiti.

=== 2026 ===
- For the 2026 Rajasthan Local Government Elections the post of head (Pradhan) of Rampura Dabri Panchayat Samiti was reserved for Scheduled Caste Women (SC Mahila). Head's position was reserved after seat reservation lottery in Rajasthan that was held on 23rd September, 2026.
- After the recent delimitation of 2025-26, for the political representation Rampura Dabri Panchayat Samiti was divided into 15 wards according to applicable reservation.

== Nearest towns ==
Chomu is the nearest town to Rampura for all major economic activities, and is approximately 8 km away. Rampura is located 27 km towards North from the district headquarters Jaipur. Boodthal (4 km), Jahota (5 km), Nangalsiras (5 km), Jairampura (6 km), Nangalpurohitan (6 km) are some nearby villages to Rampura Dabri. * Jaipur, Reengus, Sri Madhopur, Sambhar are some nearby cities. Rampura Dabri Tehsil is surrounded by Govindgarh Tehsil and Shahpura Tehsil towards the north, and Jhotwara Tehsil and Jaipur Tehsil towards the south.

== Transport ==
National Highway 52 passes through the village. Bhaton Ki Gali Railway Station and Chomun Railway Station are nearby.

== Government offices ==
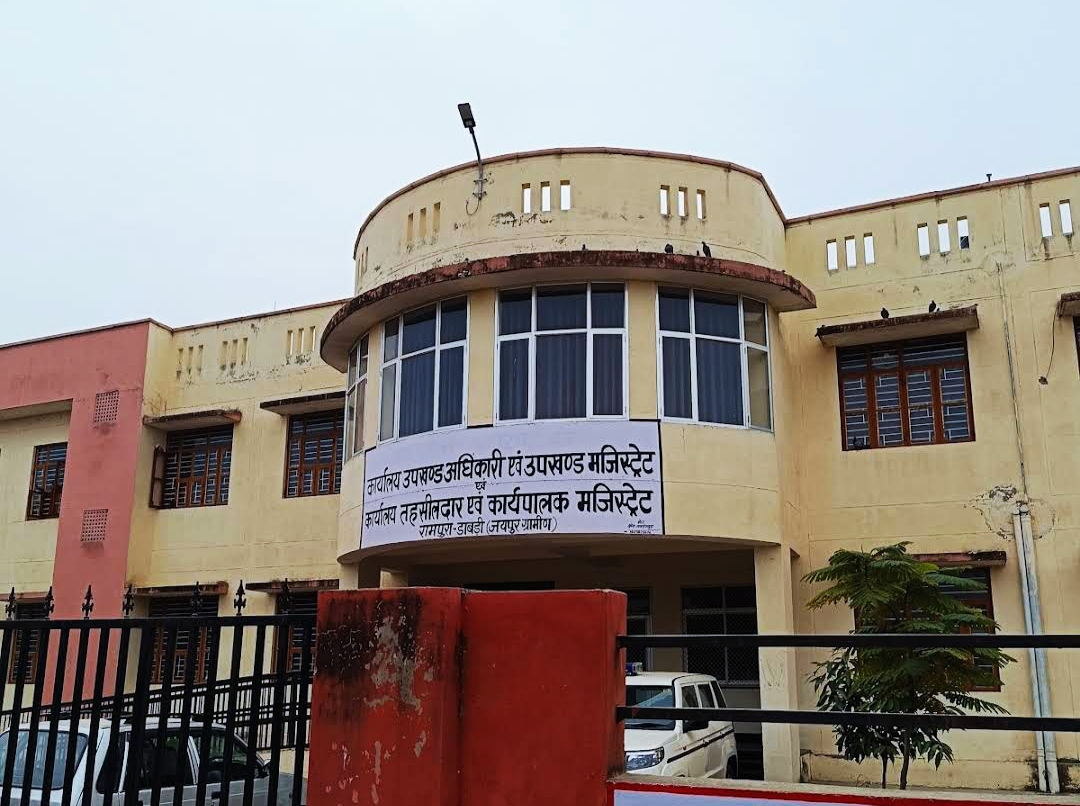
Rampura Dabri Tehsil and Upkhand Office

Rampura Dabri has a Tehsil office, Executive Magistrate court and a Sub Divisional Magistrate office, as well as a Gram Panchayat office. Ayushman Arogya Mandir is the subdistrict primary government hospital of Rampura Dabri Tehsil.

== See also ==
- Outline of Rajasthan
- List of tehsils of Rajasthan
- List of districts of Rajasthan
- List of cities and towns in Rajasthan
- List of urban local bodies in Rajasthan
