= Asnawar =

- Town
- Country: India
- State: Rajasthan
- District: Jhalawar
- Elevation: 309 m (1,014 ft)

Population (2011)
  - Total: 15,000

Languages
  - Official: Hindi
- Time zone: UTC+5:30 (IST)
- PIN: 326021

Asnawar is a small town in Jhalawar district, Rajasthan, India, with a population of about 15,000. It was formerly known as Aasnaver. The Kalisindh River is 8 kilometres (5 mi) from Asnawar.

== History ==
Asnawar is situated in the south-eastern region of Rajasthan, a region widely known as Malwa, the land of malwas. The Jhalawar district is part of the Malwa region of Rajasthan.

Asnawar was merged on 1 November 1956. Reason for merging was that it was far from Madhya Pradesh. At present it is located in southern-western part of Jhalawar district of Rajasthan.

The state of Jhalawar (now a district) was founded on 8 April 1838, out of the Kota territory. Jhalawar state got rise as a result of a treaty between English rulers, Kota state, and Malwa state.

Nearby airports are at Kota (KHO, 92 miles), Indore (IDR, 123 miles), Gwalior (GWL, 151 miles), and Jaipur (JAI, 177 miles).

== Geography ==
Asnawar is located at the border of Rajasthan and Madhya Pradesh, at 24.42°N 76.57°E. It has an average elevation of 1,013 feet (309 m).

Asnawar's area is an expanse of fertile plain having rich black-cotton soil. It is watered by several rivers, giving it a verdant look.

=== Climate ===
The climate of the area is very similar to that of the Indo-Gangetic plain, with hot dry summer and cold winters. The monsoon is, however, quite unlike and very distinct from the oppressive humid climate of the North India plains. Asnawar (Jhalawar district) is known for the highest rainfall in the Rajasthan state. An average of 35 inches of rainfall keeps it cool, and gentle breezes ward off the stifling humidity.

- Summer: 47.0 °C (max.), 32.5 °C (min.)
- Winter: 32.5 °C (max.), 9.5 °C (min.)
- Average rainfall: 943 mm (per year)
- Best season to travel : September - March

== Demographics ==
As of 2001 India census, Asnawar had a population of 15,000. Males constituted 52% of the population and females 48%. Asnawar had an average literacy rate of 61%, higher than the national average of 59.5%; with 62% of the males and 38% of females literate. 17% of the population was under 6 years of age.

== Economy ==
The conomy is based on agriculture. This area is known for the highest rainfall in the Rajasthan state. The district also has a lot of irrigation dams, ponds, and medium scale projects, which serve the needs of farmers.

Jhalawar district is also known for the production of oranges. The area around Bhawani Mandi is an important place on the international and national citrus (naarangi) fruit map. Citrus fruits produced in Jhalawar region are of export quality, and are exported to various countries. The citrus-belt is spread around the Bhawani Mandi, Jhalawar and Pirawa sub-divisions.

Agricultural information:

- Total land area (irrigated): 60%
- Total land area (non-irrigated): 40%

Major crops of the region:

Kharif

- Soya bean
- Pulses
- Jowar
- Maize

Rabi

- Wheat
- Mustard
- Grain
- Coriander

== Education ==
Higher education:

- Government Higher Secondary School
- Govt Girls Higher Secondary School
- Model senior secondary school
