= Kasba Dehra =

- Town
- Location in Rajasthan, India Kasba Dehra (India)
- Coordinates: 27.31°N 76.45°E
- Country: India
- State: Rajasthan
- District: Alwar district

Government
  - Type: Democratic
- Elevation: 264 m (866 ft)

Population (2020)
  - Total: 3,000

Languages
  - Official: Hindi
- Time zone: UTC+5:30 (IST)
- Postal code: 301001

Kasba Dehra is a Kasba (Town) in Alwar district in Rajasthan, India.

== Transport ==
Kasba Dehra is located on State Highway 14 and it connects many nearby villages for daily essential needs including Chandoli, Shahpur, Tehardpur, Mangalbas, Bala Dehra, Amritvas, Hajipur, Dhokdi, Kadooki, Thekda, Todiyar etc. Chandoli is a Cyber Hub Village which was visited by Mark Zuckerberg in 2019. As of now, the most commonly used forms of medium-distance transport in Kasba Dehra are government-owned services such as railways and buses, as well as privately operated lok pariwahan buses, taxis and auto rickshaws.

== Geography ==
Kasba Dehra is located at latitude 27.316088 and longitude 76.4537287. It has an average elevation of 264 m (866 ft). It is nearby post office Vijay Mandir, fort of Jitendra Singh.

== Services ==
- Hospital - Govt. Hospital
- Police Station - Govt. Rajasthan Police Station.
- School - Primary, Senior and Senior Secondary Schools and many more Play Group Schools.(Hindi/English Medium).
- Bank - SBI and Cooperative Banks.

== Tourist attractions ==
- Sant Charandas Ji Maharaj Temple
- Chudsidh Baba Temple
- Shiv Mandir
- Vijay Mandir Fort
- Dadhikar Fort
