= Pahari, Rajasthan =

Pahari
- City
- Interactive map of Pahari
- Coordinates: 27.710362°N 77.081783°E
- Country: India
- State: Rajasthan
- District: Deeg

Languages
  - Official: Hindi
- Time zone: UTC+5:30 (IST)
- PIN: 321204
- ISO 3166 code: RJ-IN
- Vehicle registration: RJ-

Pahari, also known as Pahadi, is a tehsil and panchayat village in Deeg district of Rajasthan in India.

== History ==
The tehsil was initially part of Bharatpur district, but later became part of the Deeg district after the bifurcation on 7 August 2023.

The region was historically part of the Mewat region and later of the Bharatpur State in the Rajputana. It was considered as the stronghold of the Meo community and is also currently has the culture similar to the Nuh, along with high influence of Mewati culture and Mewati language.

== Demographics ==
The population of Pahari is 198,897 in 30,154 households as of 2011. The sex ratio of the region is 921 females per 1000 males, which is slightly lower than the state average of 928 females per 1000 males. The literacy rate of the subdivision is 43.07% out of which male literacy is 56.04% and females being 28.98%.

Scheduled Castes and Scheduled Tribes account for 6.59% and 0.28% of the total population of the tehsil.

Religion in Pahari tehsil
Religion
Islam	72.87%
Hinduism	23.07%
Sikhism	3.78%
Christian	0.12%
Others	0.14%

The majority religion in tehsil is Islam with around 73% of the population being adherent to the religion, followed by Hinduism and Sikhism as the second and third largest religion as of 2011 census. It is the only tehsil in Rajasthan with Islam as the majority religion, which is due to the region historically being part of Mewat and settlement of the Meos from neighbouring districts of Nuh.
