= Bahaj =

Village in Rajasthan, India

- Village
- Bahaj
- Location in Rajasthan, India Bahaj (India)
- Coordinates: 27°28′11.42″N 77°22′21.37″E
- State: Rajasthan
- District: Deeg

Government
  - Body: Gram panchayat

Population (2011)
  - Total: 7,712

Languages
  - Official: Hindi
- Time zone: UTC+5:30 (IST)
- PIN: 321203
- ISO 3166 code: RJ-IN

Bahaj is a village in Deeg tehsil of Bharatpur in Rajasthan, India. known for an ancient palaeochannel buried 23 metres under the village, which was discovered by the Archaeological Survey of India (ASI) in 2025. The village considered part of the Braj region of Mathura.

== Demographics ==
As per the 2011 Census of India, Bahaj had a population of 7,712. Males population is 4042 of the population and 3670 females. In Bahaj, 1209 population is under 6 years of age. Major language spoken there is Brij Bhasha.
