= Dhabbawali Mata Temple =

Hindu temple in Rajasthan, India

Dhabbawali Mata Temple (ढब्बावाली माता मंदिर)
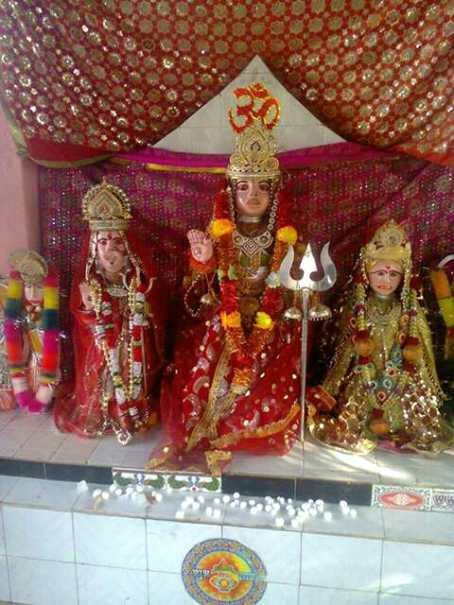

Religion
- Affiliation: Hinduism
- District: Sanchore

Location
- Location: Khasarvi
- State: Rajasthan
- Country: India

Dhabbawali Mata Temple (Hindi: ढब्बावाली माता मंदिर) is a famous Hindu temple located in the Sanchore district of Rajasthan, India. The idol of Goddess Dhabbawali Mata is installed in it. It is situated at Khasarvi, 35km north-west of District Sanchore. A Goddess Peeth on the revered land of Rajasthan, which is situated on the holy land of village Khasarvi of district Jalore.

== Fair and Special ==
In this temple of Mataji, a fair is held on the full moon of every month, in which thousands of devotees come to pay their respects at the door of the mother. Visitors to this temple are not allowed to take the prasad offered to Mataji out of the Khasarvi area.

== See also ==
- Sanchore district
- Karni Mata Temple
- Sundha Mata Temple
- ढब्बावाली माता मंदिर, खासरवी
