= Pirawa =

Pirawa Earlier a part of Tonk Riyasat
- town
- Location in Rajasthan, India Pirawa (India)
- Coordinates: 24.17°N 76.03°E
- Country: India
- State: Rajasthan
- District: Jhalawar
- Elevation: 370 m (1,210 ft)

Population (2001)
  - Total: 11,182

Languages
  - Official: Hindi
- Time zone: UTC+5:30 (IST)
- ISO 3166 code: RJ-IN
- Vehicle registration: RJ17-

Pirawa is a city and a municipality in Jhalawar district in the India.

== Geography ==
Pirawa is located at 24.17°N 76.03°E. It has an average elevation of 370 metres (1213 feet).

== Demographics ==
As of 2001 India census, Pirawa had a population of 11,182. Males constitute 51% of the population and females 49%. Pirawa has an average literacy rate of 66%, higher than the national average of 59.5%: male literacy is 74%, and female literacy is 58%. In Pirawa, 16% of the population is under 6 years of age.

== Education ==
Vardhaman Be.d College, Guradiya, Pirawa

- Government College, pirawa, Rajasthan, India

Government schools

- Govt. Senior Secondary school
- Govt. Senior secondary girls school ( arts )

Private schools

- Adarsh vidhya mandir
- Mahaveer digambar Jain school
- Central public school
- Maa bharti school
- Jyoti senior secondary school

== N.G.O. ==
- Zeal Educational & Welfare Society

Secretary : Shahid Mohammad

Jain Aryan's Welfare And Education Society

President: Saurabh Jain
Secratry: Manohar Singh sisodiya
