= Sant Charandas =

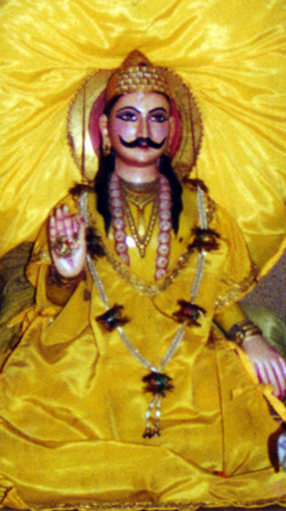
Statue of Sant Charandas, Charandas Temple, Old Delhi.

Sant Charandas was a major Hindu religious teacher in Delhi during the eighteenth century.

== Biography ==
Caraṇdās (1703-1782) was born in Ḍahrā, near Alwar, but at the age of seven he was brought to Dehli after the death of his father. Caraṇdās claimed his guru was Śukdev, the mythological narrator of the Bhāgavata Purāṇa. He founded the Caraṇdāsī Vaiṣṇav sect in 1753.

== Teachings ==
Charandas is the author of around twenty works. Many of these are in verse and deal with aspects of devotion, particularly relating to the worship of Krishna. He is credited by his followers with a vision of Krishna while on pilgrimage to Vraj in mid-life, as well as a further meeting with Shukdev at the same time.

He wrote commentaries on various Upanishads, particularly the Katha Upanishad, and on specific yoga practices, especially Pranayama, control of the breath.

A member of the Sant mystical tradition, Charandas's teachings draw on a wide range of sources and emphasize the nearness of the Divine to each person, the need to follow a guru, the importance of sharing in a community of like-minded believers not dependent on caste (Satsang), and the value of leading a strictly moral life.

Two of his major disciples, Sahjo Bai and Daya Bai, both women, are also famous for their poetry.
