= Deeg district =

- District of Rajasthan
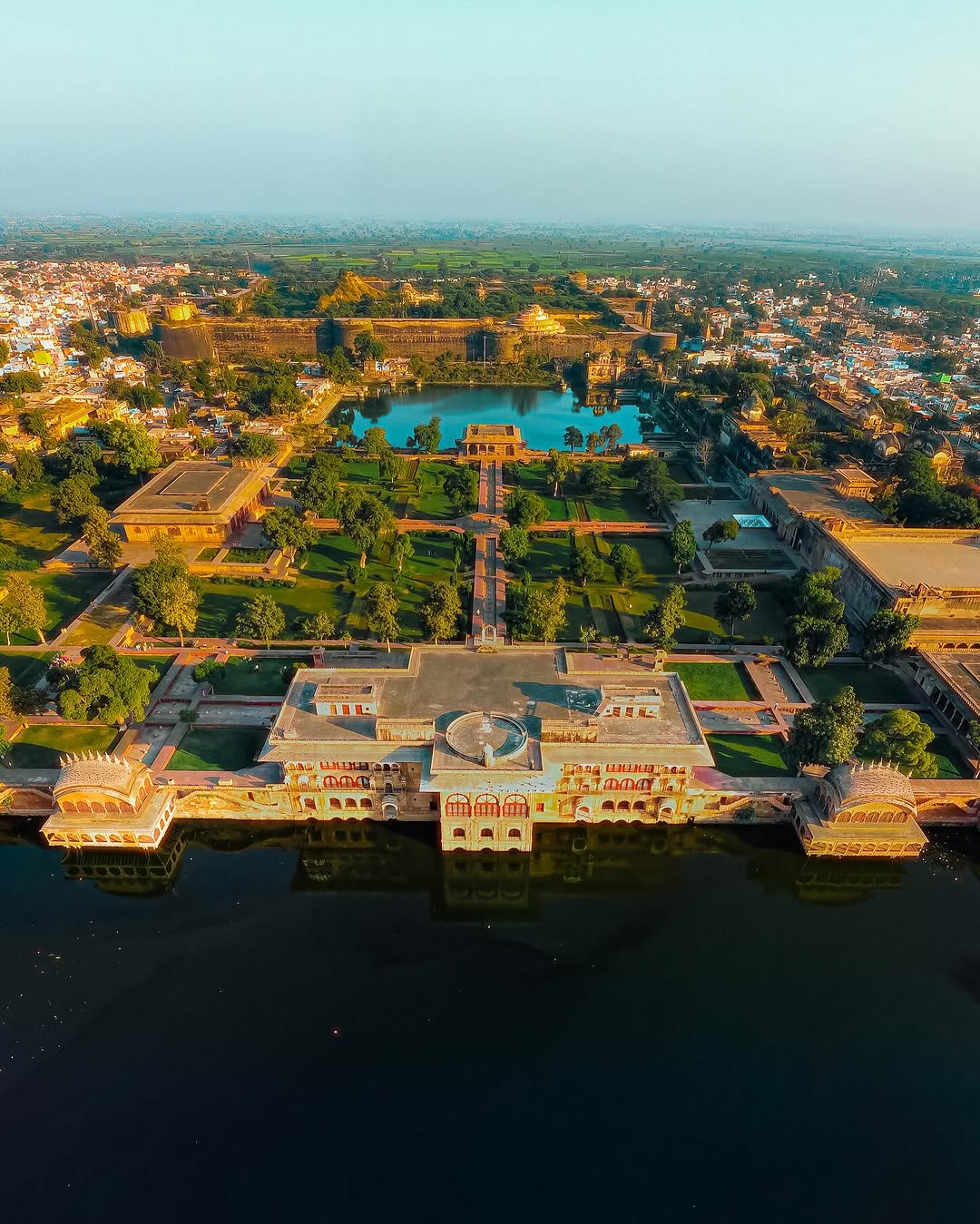
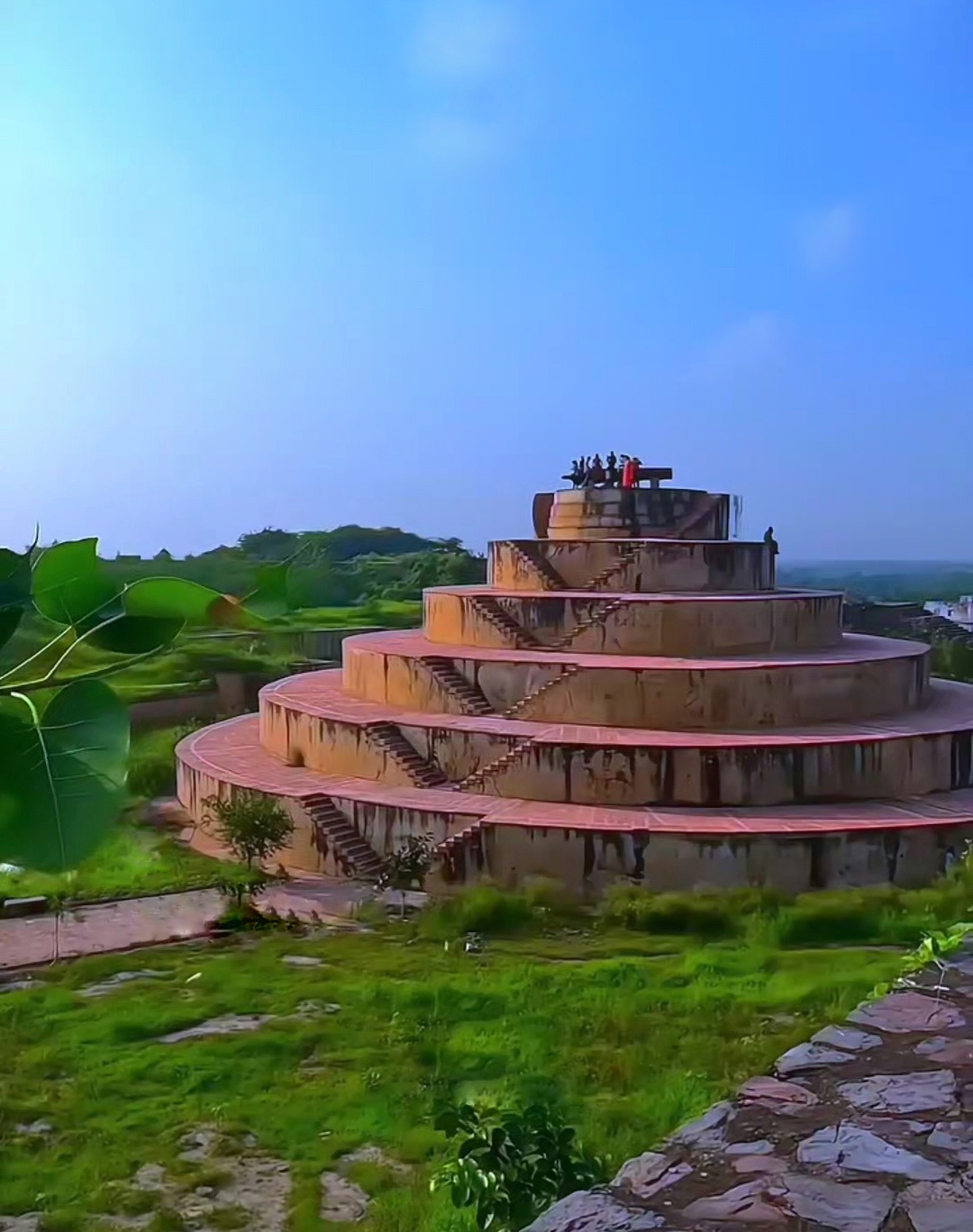
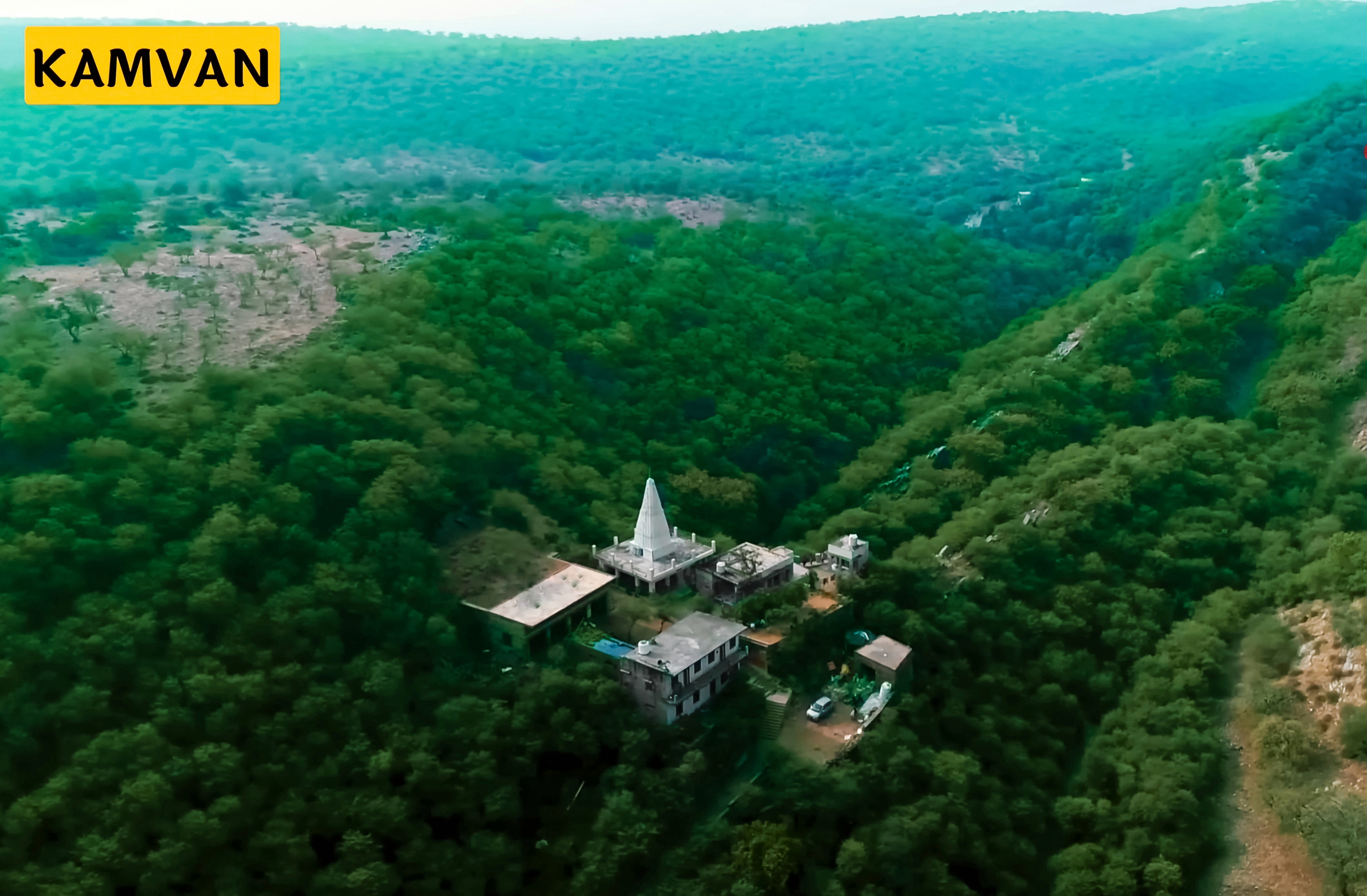
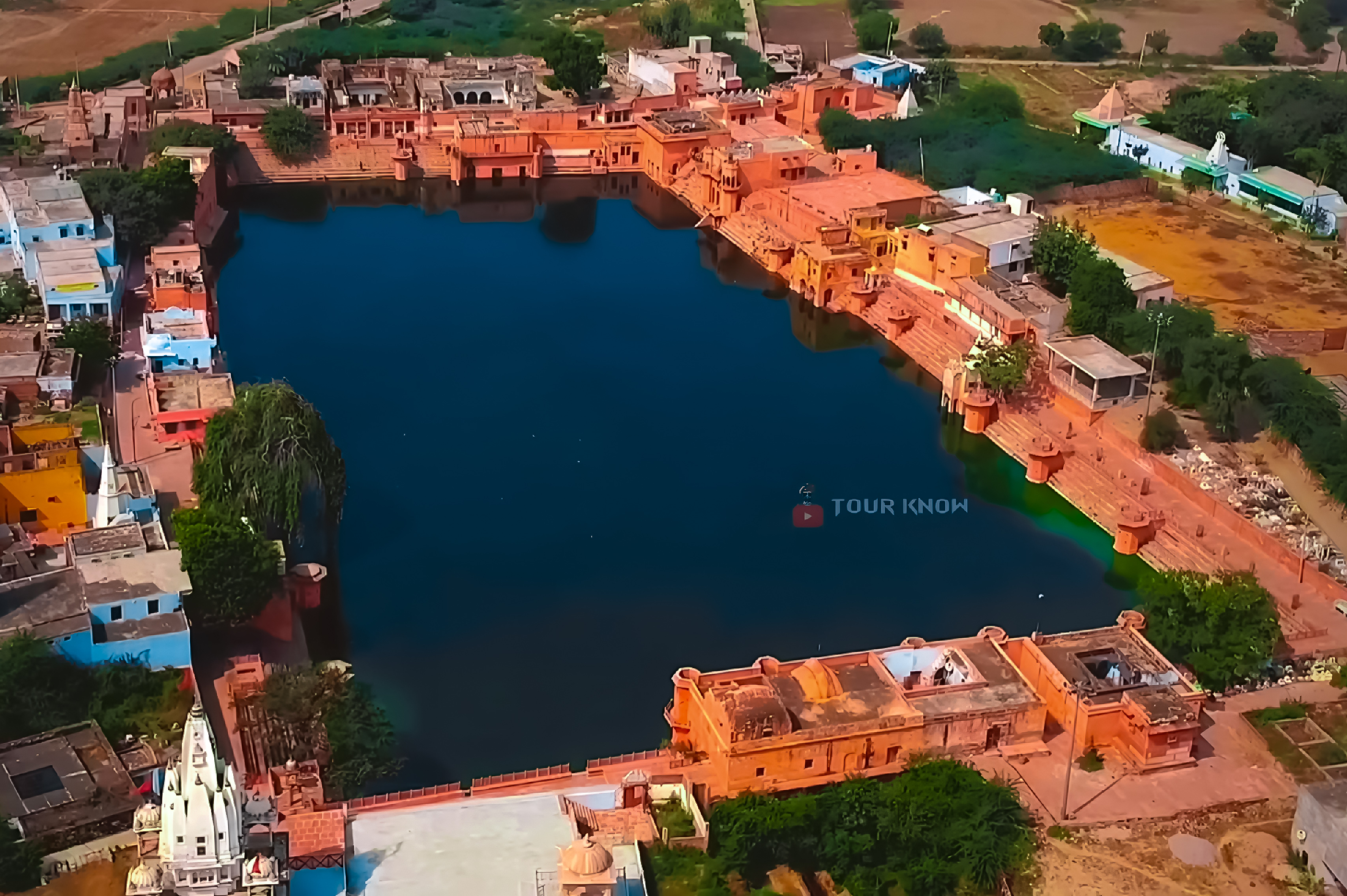
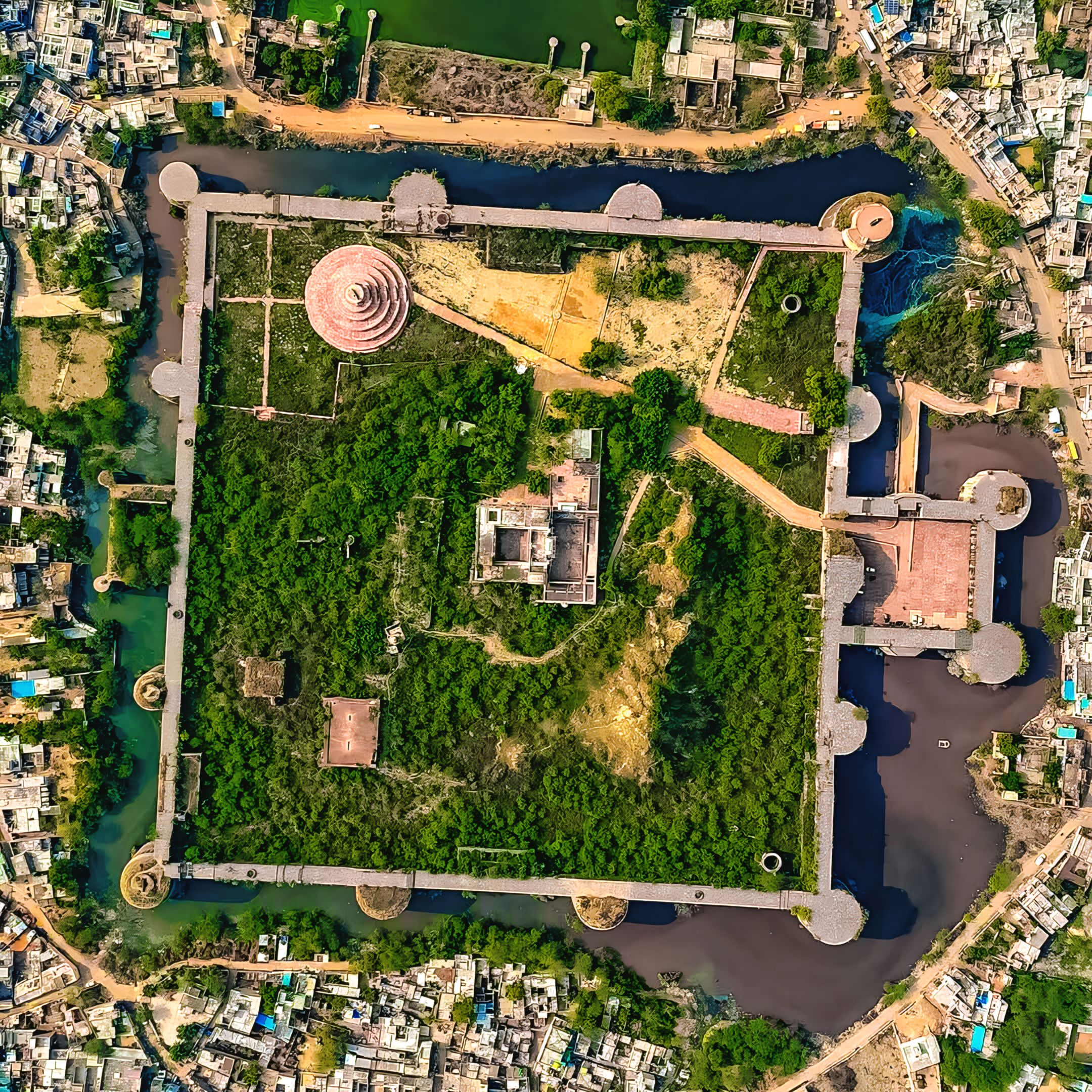
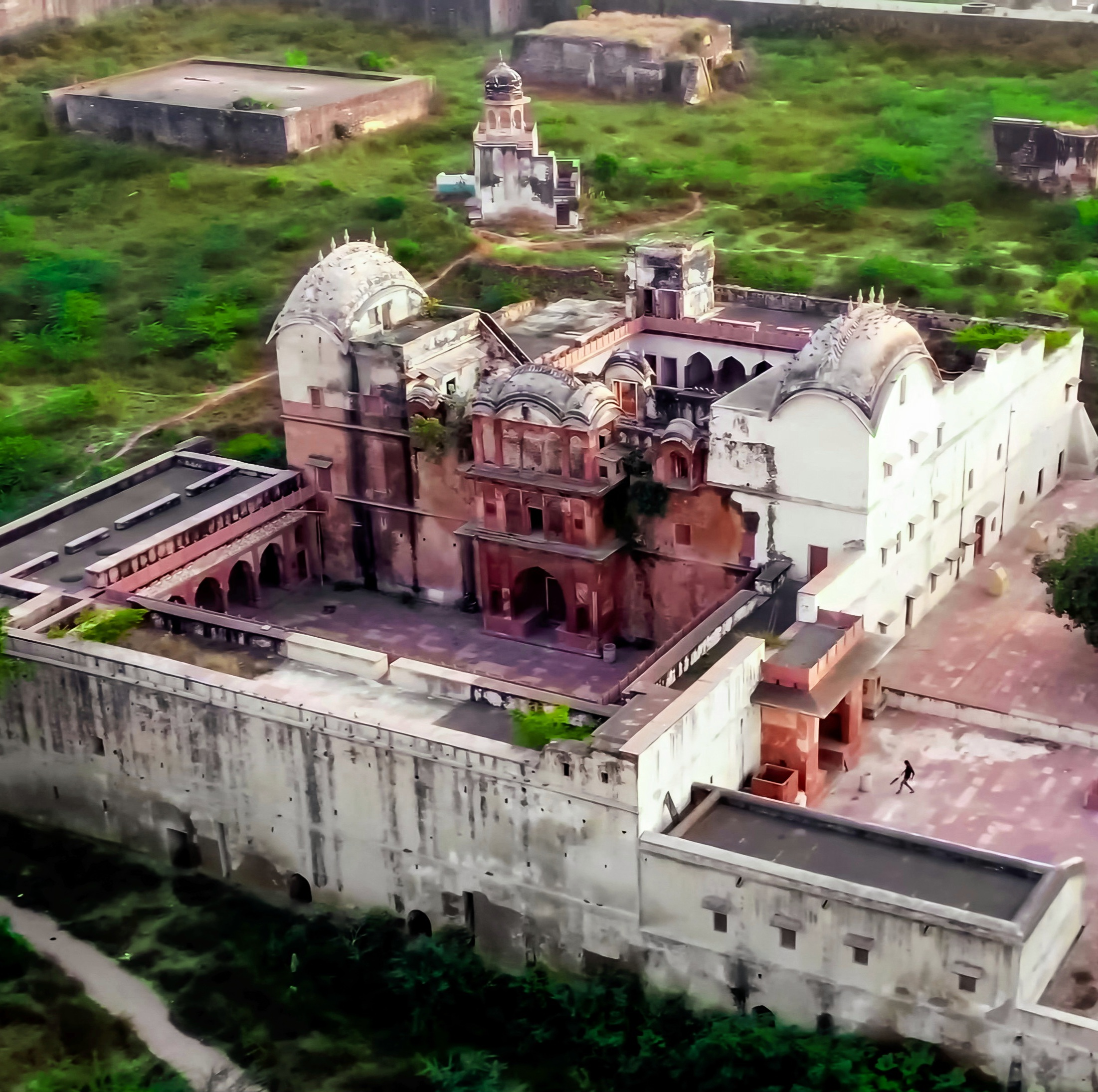
- Deeg Palace

- Deeg district are part of Braj region and Mewat region of Rajasthan. Location of Deeg district in Rajasthan

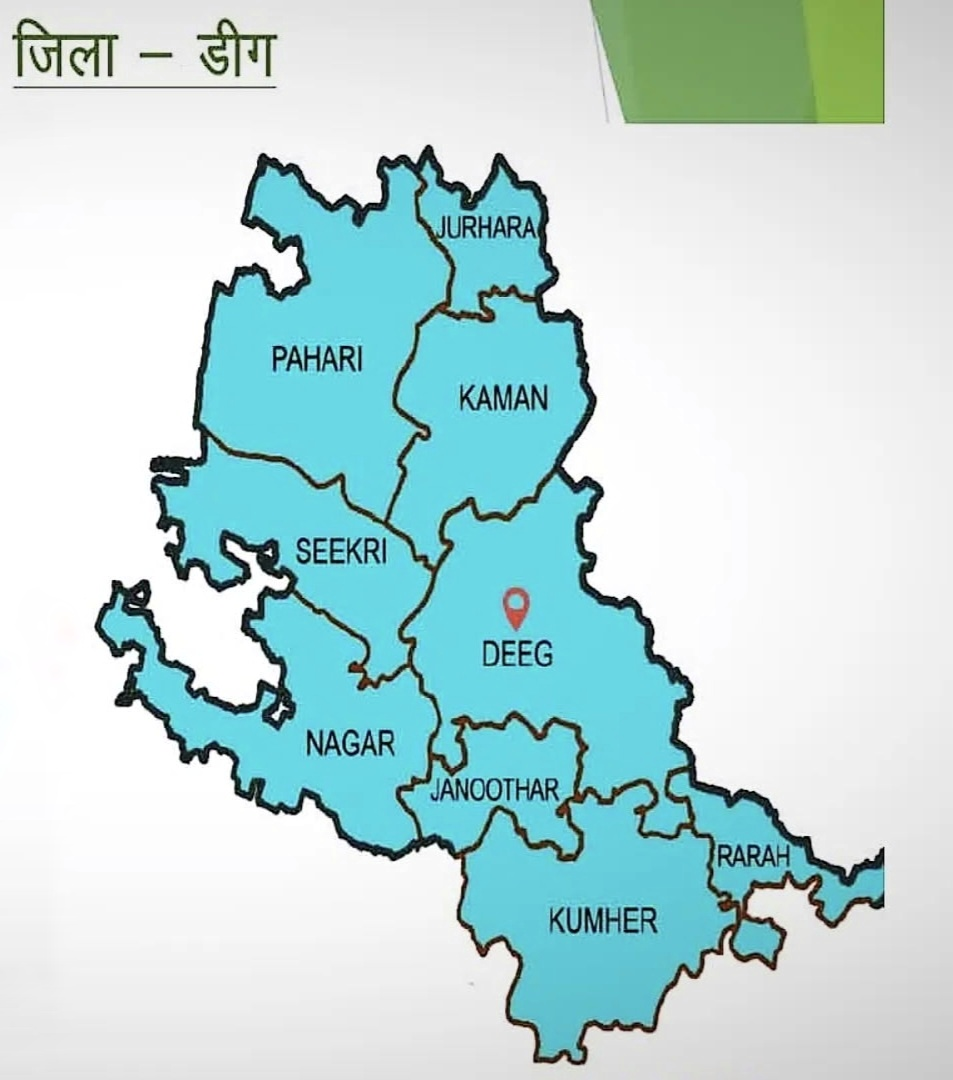
- Country: India
- State: Rajasthan
- Division: Bharatpur
- Established: August 2023
- Headquarters: Deeg

Government
  - District Collector & Magistrate: Utsav Kaushal, IAS
  - Superintendent of Police: Rajesh Kumar Meena, IPS

Area
  - Total: 2,169 km^{2} (837 sq mi)

Population (2011)
  - Total: 1,072,755
  - Density: 494.6/km^{2} (1,281/sq mi)
  - Urban: 132,151
  - Rural: 940,604
- Time zone: UTC+05:30 (IST)
- Postal code: 321203
- Website: Deeg District

Deeg district is a district in Rajasthan state in northwestern India. it is newly formed administrative district in Rajasthan, carved out of the former Bharatpur district. Deeg District, inaugurated on August 7, 2023.

== Demographics ==
Religions in Deeg district (2011)
Religion	Percent
Hinduism	66.02%
Islam	31.90%
Sikhism	1.65%
Other or not stated	0.43%

Block	Hindu	Muslim	Other
Deeg	207,946	17,634	1,130
Pahari	45,892	144,945	8,060
Kaman	110,334	91,562	2053
Nagar	145,435	86,598	9,825
Kumher	198,646	1,440	1,255

Languages of Deeg district (2011)
1. Braj Bhasha (52.9%)
2. Hindi (31.6%)
3. Rajasthani (11.9%)
4. Urdu (1.62%)
5. Punjabi (1.55%)
6. Others (0.45%)

Deeg district has a population of 1,072,755. Deeg district has a sex ratio of 894 females per 1,000 males. 132,151 (12.32%) lived in urban areas. Scheduled Castes and Scheduled Tribes make up 163,199 (15.21%) and 10,669 (0.99%) of the population respectively.

=== Religion ===
Hindus are the majority community in the district. Muslims, mainly Meos, are largely rural and are majority in the northern tehsils which are part of Mewat. Southern tehsils are predominantly Hindu with very small minorities percentage.

=== Languages ===
At the time of the 2011 census, 52.86% of the population spoke Braj, 31.65% Hindi, 11.87% Rajasthani, 1.62% Urdu and 1.55% Punjabi as their first language.

== Geography ==
=== Administrative divisions ===
Deeg district has 9 tehsils:

Pahari, Jurhara, Kaman, Seekri, Nagar, Deeg, Janoothar, Kumher and Rarah.

=== Tri-junction of Rajasthan, Haryana, and Uttar Pradesh states ===
Deeg district is on tri-junction of three states. It is bordered by Haryana to the north, Uttar Pradesh to the east, Bharatpur district to the south, and Alwar district to the west.

=== Part of Mewat and Brij ===
The district is located at the junction of the Mewat region and Braj region, with its northern tehsils (Kaman, Pahari, Nagar, Seekri, Jurhara) being part of the Mewat region and southern tehsils (Deeg, Kumher, Janoothar, and Rarah) being part of Braj.

== History ==
=== Bahaj archaeological site ===
In June 2025, excavations at Bahaj village, 3 km east of Deeg city, by the Archaeological Survey of India (ASI) found over 800 cultural artifacts belonging to several continuously inhabited periods, namely post-Indus Valley Civilisation period, Mahabharata period, Maurya Empire period, Kushan Empire period, Shunga Empire, and Gupta Empire periods earliest of which is 4,500 years old. The artifacts include seals in tools made of bones, Brahmi script, pottery, copper coins, yajna kund (fire sacrifice pit), terracotta idols of Hindu deities Lord Shiva and his consort Parvati in Shakti-Bhakti tradition, terracotta statuettes some of which could be as old as 2500 to 2700 years old which shows that "the Braj region has been a centre of religious, cultural, and historical heritage."

A human skeleton was also found, which has been sent to Israel for the further scientific studies to determine the age and culture of the specimen. This area is part of Mahabharta era 84-kos Vraja Parikrama associated with the Lord Krishna.

==== Indus Valley Civilisation period ====
A 23 meter deep excavation also found paleochannel of a river, which archaeologists associated with one of the channels of sacred Sarasvati River.

==== Vedic period ====
Mahabharta period find include pottery, yajna fire pit with circular and rectangular markings on it and signs of fire rituals. The conch shell bangles, semi-precious stone beads, pottery culture, including artifacts found and which have figures depicting clothing of that period, are consistent with the vedic period and the late vedic period.

==== Mauryan period ====
Mauryan period findings include an idol of Mother Goddess from 400 BC.

==== Gupta period ====
Gupta period findings include the mud walls and pillars of the Gupta architecture, copper and iron metallurgy furnaces, tools made from bones such as "needles, combs and moulds".

=== Sultanate era ===
In early medieval times, the Bharatpur region was ruled under the Mewat State under the Khanzadas of Mewat from 1372 to 1527 AD who are mostly rajput converted to Islam.

=== Hindu Jat era ===
The area in later medieval times was ruled by the Sinsinwar clan of the Hindu Jats. In 1733 AD, Maharajah Suraj Mal built the city of Bharatpur as a well-fortified city which was carved out from the Mewat region and named it after the Bharat, Lord Rama's younger brother. Jat conquered Agra and ruled it over decade.

As recorded by the historian Aziz Ahmad, Jats led by Rajaram Jat attacked and plundered Akbar's the tomb in 1685 during the reign of Aurangzeb after defeating Mughal forces. Jats looted gold, silver, and gems from the tomb, damaged the mausoleum, and destroyed items they could not carry. According to Niccolao Manucci, the Jats also burned Akbar's remains and bones, further plundered nearby villages that maintained the Taj Mahal, setting them ablaze, and attacked Mughal officials at Palwal while ransacking the Khurja pargana.

=== Post independence ===
Deeg district was once part of Bharatpur State during British Raj before its accession to India. After Bharatpur State's merger into Rajasthan, Deeg became part of Bharatpur district. In August 2023, Chief Minister of Rajasthan, Ashok Gehlot, notified Deeg as a new district.

== Tourist Attraction ==
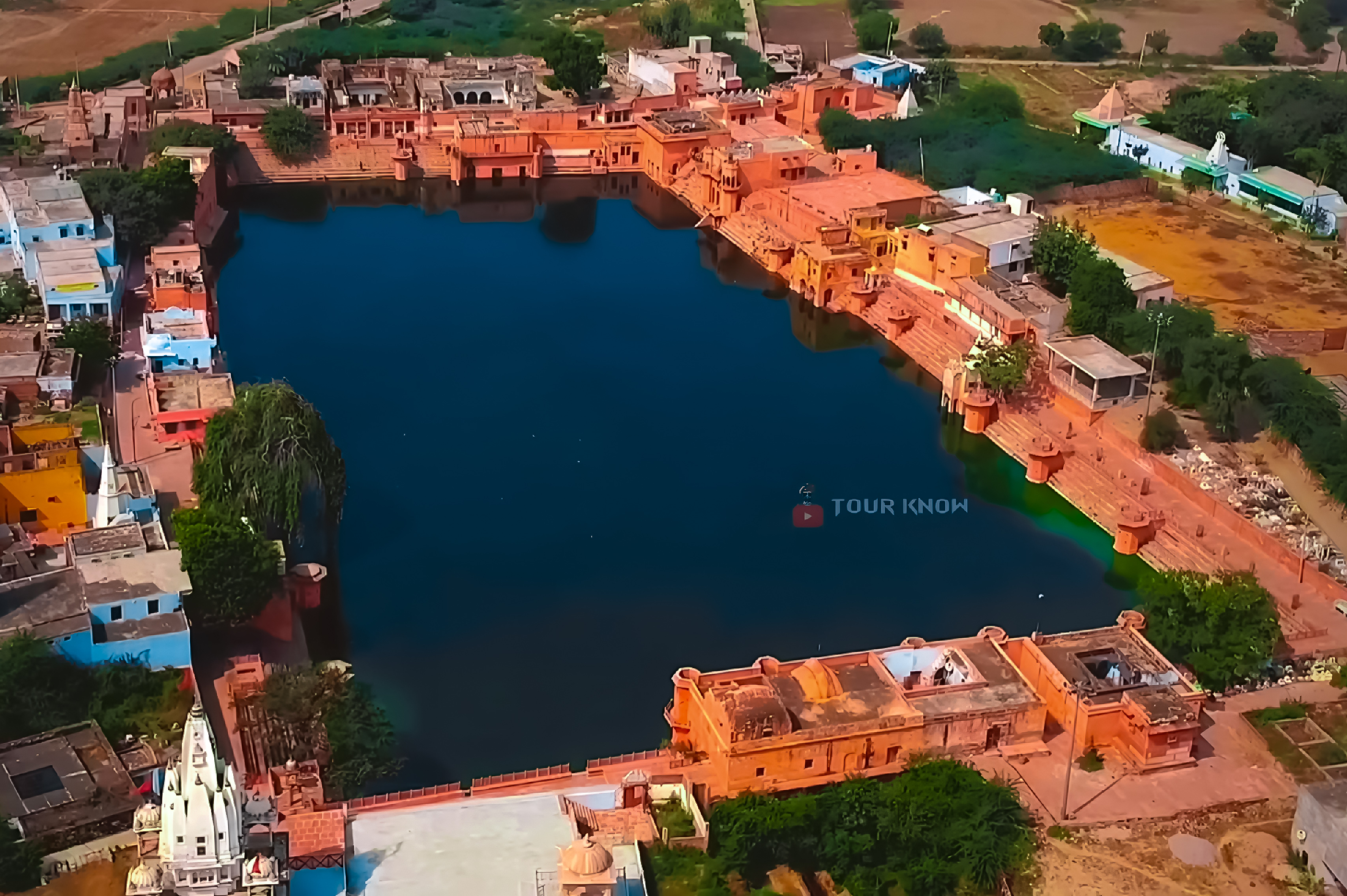
Vimal Kund in Kaman town of Deeg district.

- Aadi Badrinath Dham, 15 km northwest of Deeg city.
- Braj Kedarnath Dham, 25 km northwestof Deeg city.
- Deeg palace of Jat kings
- Kaman, 20 km north of Deeg is associated with Lord Krishna's early life and related temples and holy sites, including Vimal Kund and the Chaurasi Khamba temple (84 pillared temple).

== See also ==
- List of districts of Rajasthan
