= Jhanwar =

- village
- Jhanwar
- Interactive map of Jhanwar
- Coordinates: 26.1926390°N 72.8613174°E
- Country: India
- State: Rajasthan
- District: Jodhpur

Languages
  - Official: Hindi, Rajasthani
- Time zone: UTC+5:30 (IST)
- Postal code: 342014
- ISO 3166 code: RJ-IN
- Vehicle registration: RJ-19

Jhanwar is a village and tehsil in the Jodhpur district of Rajasthan. It is believed to have been settled by Chaudhary Malji Kalirana around 1200 AD.

== Population ==
According to the 2011 Census, Jhanwar had a population of 5,648, comprising 2,916 males and 2,732 females. The population of children aged 0–6 years was 939, accounting for 16.63% of the total population. The average sex ratio of the village was 937, while the child sex ratio stood at 859.
