= Khasarvi =

Sub tehsil in Rajasthan, India

- Sub Tehsil
- Location in Rajasthan, India Khasarvi (India)
- Coordinates: 24°47′58″N 71°28′53″E
- Country: India
- State: Rajasthan
- District: Jalore

Area
  - Total: 99,565 ha (246,030 acres)

Population
  - Total: 79,967

Languages
- Time zone: UTC+5:30 (IST)
- PIN: 343027
- ISO 3166 code: RJ-IN
- Vehicle registration: RJ-46

Khasarvi is a village and sub-tehsil located in the Jalore of the northwestern Indian state of Rajasthan. Khasarvi is notable for its historical, religious, and administrative contributions. The population of this village is 1837 which 967 are males while 870 are females as per Population Census 2011.

== Geography ==
Khasarvi Village is nestled within the picturesque landscapes of the Jalore District, which is characterized by its arid terrain and a semi-desert environment typical of the Rajasthan region.

== Historical significance ==
One of the distinctive features of Khasarvi is the presence of the ancient Dhabbawali Mata Temple. This religious site holds immense historical and cultural significance, attracting pilgrims and tourists alike. The Dhabbawali Mata Temple stands as a symbol of the village's deep-rooted spiritual heritage and its connection to the region's history.

== Administrative Importance ==
The elevation of Khasarvi Village to the status of a sub-tehsil marked a significant development in its administrative role. Following this elevation, the government issued a delimitation order which redefined the administrative boundaries. As a result, a total of 85 villages spanning across 12 Patwar mandals were incorporated within the ambit of the Khasarvi sub-tehsil. This expansion marked an important milestone in the village's role as an administrative center within the Sanchore District.
