= Bapini =

- Tehsil
- Interactive map of Bapini
- Location in Rajasthan, India
- Country: India
- State: Rajasthan
- District: Phalodi
- Time zone: UTC+5:30 (IST)

Bapini is a tehsil in Phalodi, Rajasthan, India. It is located near Osian.

Its location is latitude 27.1983641 and longitude 72.8500649.
