= Kalwar, Rajasthan =

Kalwar
- village
- Country: India
- State: Rajasthan
- District: Jaipur

Population
  - Total: 8,393

Languages
  - Official: Hindi
- Time zone: UTC+5:30 (IST)
- PIN: 302012

Kalwar (Post Office Kaalwaad) is a village in Jhotwara Mandal in Jaipur District, Rajasthan, India. Kalwar is 18 km distance from its Mandal Main Town Jhotwara, and 22.8 km distance from its District Main City Jaipur. And 24 km distance from its State Main City Jaipur. According to census in 2011, 8393 People are living in this Village and in 2023 population is estimated to be 10,239.

There is a mountain in the middle of the village Kalwar. In the local near area Kalwar is known for its crop production and Verities in Farming. it is continuesly developing in Jaipur City side area.
