= Patodi, Rajasthan =

Patodi
- Village
- Location in Rajasthan, India Patodi (India)
- Coordinates: 26°04′25″N 72°15′57″E
- Country: India
- State: Rajasthan
- District: Balotra
- Tehsil: Pachpadra

Area
  - Total: 6.67 km^{2} (2.58 sq mi)

Population (2011)
  - Total: 3,492
  - Density: 524/km^{2} (1,360/sq mi)
- Time zone: UTC+5:30 (IST)
- PIN: 344032
- Telephone code: +91-2988

Patodi is a village and tehsil headquarters of Patodi tehsil in Balotra district, Rajasthan, India. It is situated about 30 km west of Pachpadra and 120 km east of Barmer. It is famous for its handmade Mojri.

As of the 2011 Census, it had 636 households and a population of 3,492 (1,814 males and 1,678 females).
