= Rajputana =

Region of India up to 1949

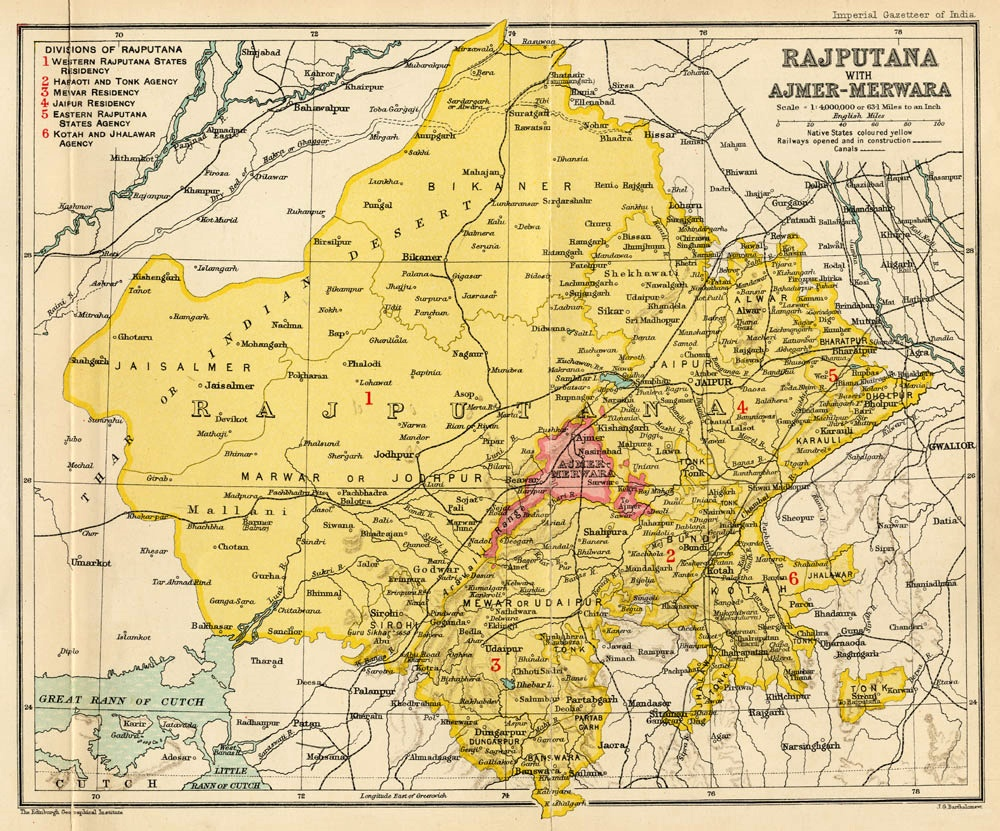
The map of the Rajputana Agency in 1909 from the Imperial Gazetteer. Legend: princely states are in yellow

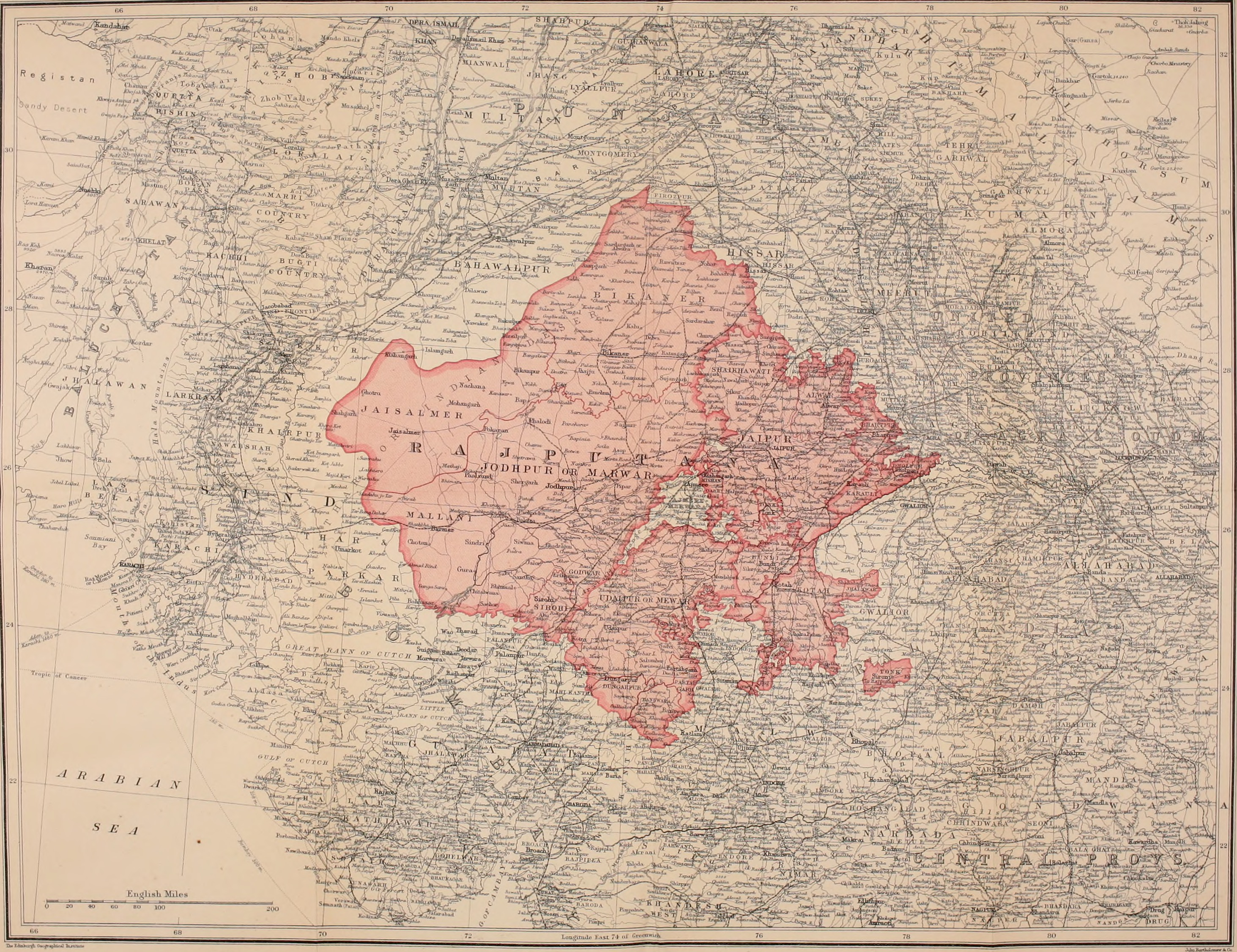
Map of Rajputana or Rajasthan, 1920

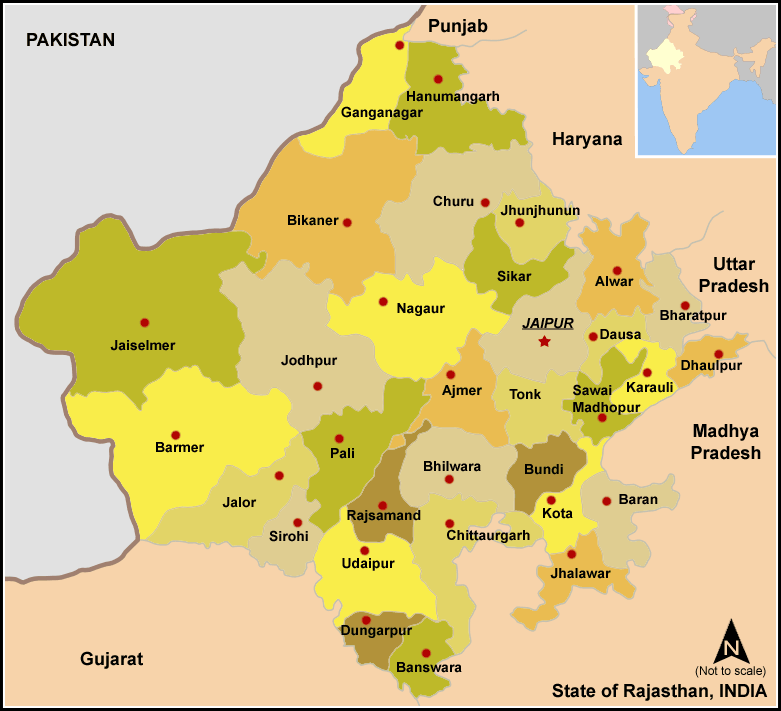
Districts of the present-day state of Rajasthan

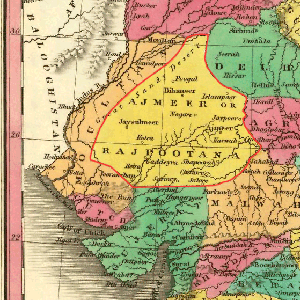
Rajpootana region as depicted in the Map of India by Anthony Finley in 1831

Rājputana (Hindi: [ɾaːdʒpʊt̪aːnaː]), meaning Land of the Rajputs, was a historical region in the Indian subcontinent that included mainly the entire present-day Indian state of Rajasthan, parts of the neighboring states of Madhya Pradesh and Gujarat, and adjoining areas of Sindh in modern-day southern Pakistan. The region was known for its distinctive socio political structure, characterised by numerous Rajput kingdoms and principalities that maintained a strong warrior ethos and a deeply rooted tradition of honour, kinship, and martial governance.

The main settlements to the west of the Aravalli Hills came to be known as Rajputana, early in the Medieval Period. The name was later adopted by East India Company as the Rajputana Agency for its dependencies in the region of the present-day Indian state of Rājasthān. The Rajputana Agency included 26 Rajput and 2 Jat princely states and two chiefships. This official term remained until its replacement by "Rajasthan" in the constitution of 1949.

== Name ==
George Thomas (Military Memories) was the first in 1800, to term this region the Rajputana Agency. The historian John Keay in his book, India: A History, stated that the Rajputana name was coined by the British, but that the word achieved a retrospective authenticity: in an 1829 translation of Ferishta's history of early Islamic India, John Briggs discarded the phrase "Indian princes", as rendered in Dow's earlier version, and substituted "Rajpoot princes".

The region was previously long known as Gujratra (an early form of "Gujarat"), before it came to be called Rajputana during the medieval period, although the name "Gujratra" itself originated from the Gurjara-Pratiharas.

== Geography ==
The area of Rajputana is estimated to be 343,328 square km (132,559 square miles) and breaks down into two geographic divisions:

- An area northwest of the Arāvalli Range including part of the Great Indian Thar Desert, with characteristics of being sandy and unproductive.
- A higher area southeast of the range, which is fertile by comparison.

The whole area forms the hill and plateau country between the north Indian plains and the main plateau of peninsular India.

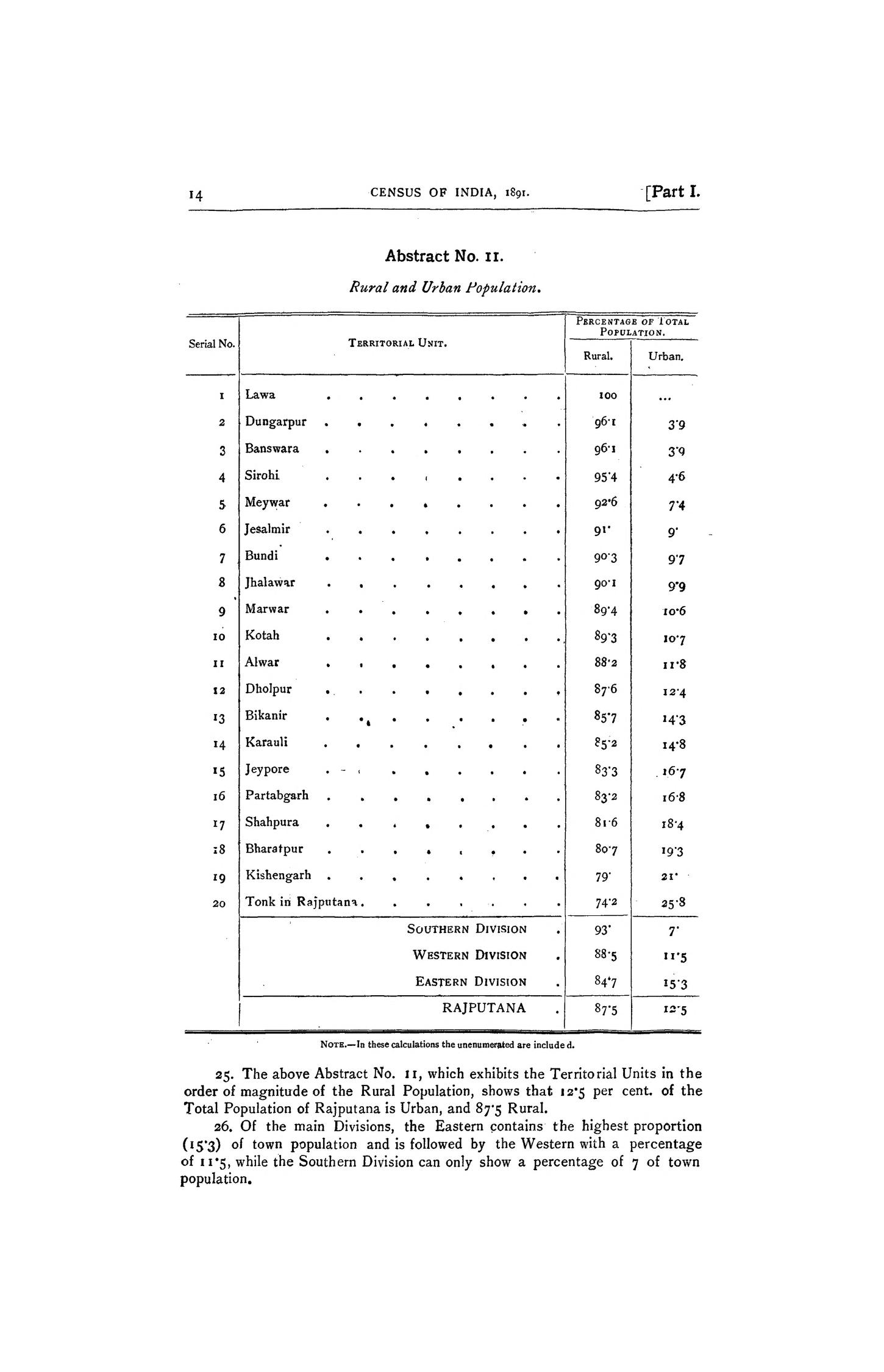
Rajputana States

== Transition to Rajasthan ==
The territory consisted of 23 states, one Sardari, one Jagir and the British district of Ajmer-Mewar. Most of the ruling princes were Rajputs. These were Rajput Kshatriyas from the historical region of Rajputana, who started entering the region in the seventh century. Jodhpur, Jaisalmer, Bikaner, Jaipur and Udaipur were the largest states. In 1947, integration of these states took place in various stages, as a result of which the State of Rajasthan came into existence. Some old areas of south-east Rajputana are now a part of Madhya Pradesh and some areas in the south-west are now part of Gujarat.

== See also ==
- List of Rajput dynasties and states
- List of dynasties and rulers of Rajasthan
- Kingdom of Marwar
- Shekhawati
- Gaurati - Godwad
- Kingdom of Mewar
- Istimrari
- Jaipur State
- Sirohi State
- Vagad
- Mewat
- Meena
