= Kaman, Rajasthan =

Kamwan कामवन
- Town
- Kaman
- Location in Rajasthan, India Kamwan (India)
- Coordinates: 27°39′12″N 77°16′11″E
- Country: India
- State: Rajasthan
- District: Deeg

Government
  - Body: Government of Rajasthan
  - MLA: Nauksham Chaudhary (BJP)
- Elevation: 189 m (620 ft)

Population (2011)
  - Total: 38,040

Languages
  - Official: Hindi
- Time zone: UTC+5:30 (IST)
- PIN: 321022
- 05640: 05640
- ISO 3166 code: RJ-IN
- Vehicle registration: RJ-64

Kaman or Kamaban is a town located in the Deeg district of Rajasthan. It is historically known to be part of the Braj area, where Krishna is believed to have spent his early life. It is also a part of the historical region of Mewat.

== Geography ==
Kaman is located at 27.65°N 77.27°E. with an approximate elevation of 189 meters (620 feet) above mean sea level. It borders the states of Haryana to the west and Uttar Pradesh to the North.

Kaman has abundant foliage of Tulsi plants, which has earned it the epithet, Adi Vrindavan. who throng the town for Van Yatra during the auspicious month of Bhadon. In the medieval times, Kaman has served as a home to the Jat and Mughal rulers. Kaman is also known as Kadambawana due to the presence of plenty of Kadamba trees within its periphery.

== Temple of Gokulchandramaji and Madanmohanji ==
Kaman is the town holding two of the Vallabhacharya Mahaprabhuji's Shuddhadvaita peeths. One is 5th peeth, also known as shri gokulchandramaji temple and the 7th peeth known as Madanmohanji temple. In both templesm the current gadipatis are of Lineage of Shri Vallabhacharyaji Mahaprabhu.

== Other temples ==
Kaman is considered to be a very old and sacred town for Hindus as it forms part of ‘ Braj’ (or ‘ Brij) area, where Lord Krishna is believed to have spent his early life. The local men believe that King Kamasen, the grandfather of Lord Krishna, renamed this town, formerly known as Brahampore. Some of the significant temple shrines of Rajasthan other than of pushtimarg of vallabh sampraday are present in Kaman such as the Kameswara Mahadeva Siva Temple, Govindaji Temple, Vimala Kunda and Chaurasi Khamba mosque.

Kaman is ruled by the number 84. There are 84 ponds, 84 temples and 84 hectares of land that is divided into 84 small pools of water.

Located to the west of Kaman township in Deeg district is the Chaurasi Khamba mosque (84 pillared mosque). There is no idol worship, or for that matter, it is called a old mosque. Chaurasi Khamba is an ancient monument having 84 intricately carved pillars, but none has been able to count the exact number yet! Every time a curious visitor has attempted to count the pillars of the mosque, the total number has either receded or exceeded the exact number. For this reason, Chaurashi Khamba is considered spooky.

== History ==
Legend also states that Lord Krishna had lived for a brief span in this monument during his childhood. Even the Pandava brothers had spent some part of the term of their exile in the forests before the Mahabharata war. Additionally, the locals believed that there is a pond close by, named Dharam Kund where the deity of Justice, Yama, had tested Yudhisthira's wisdom by assuming the form of a Yaksha.

Some men also believe that in his lifetime, King Vikramaditya, held his court at Chaurasi Khamba, though it is hard to tell whether it is just heresy or true.

== See also ==
- Pinangwan
- Indragarh
