= Nayagaon, Madhya Pradesh =

Human settlement in Madhya Pradesh, India

Nayagaon
- town
- Location within Madhya Pradesh Location within India
- Coordinates: 24°33′43.916″N 74°46′24.509″E
- Country: India
- State: Madhya Pradesh
- District: Neemuch

Population
  - Total: 6,699
- PIN: 458468

Nayagaon was a village and now a Nagar Parishad in Jawad Tehsil, Neemuch district, Madhya Pradesh, India.
