= Ghasa =

Village in udaipur (Rajasthan), India

- Village
- Location in Rajasthan, India Ghasa (India)
- Coordinates: 24.7653°N 73.8289°E
- Country: India
- State: Rajasthan
- District: Udaipur

Population (2011)
  - Total: 3,611

Languages
  - Official: Hindi, Mewari
- Time zone: UTC+5:30 (IST)
- PIN: 313201
- Vehicle registration: RJ-
- Nearest city: Udaipur
- Lok Sabha constituency: Udaipur

Ghasa is a Village in Mavli Tehsil of Udaipur District in the Indian State of Rajasthan. The total population here is 3611 in which 1767 are female and 1884 are male. Literacy rate is 59.82% in which male is 71.80% and female is 47.31%.
