= Chandhan =

Chandhan (चांधन)
- Gram Panchayat
- Location within Rajasthan Location within India
- Coordinates: 26.59°N 71.18°E
- State: India
- State: Rajasthan
- District: Jaisalmer
- Elevation: 233 m (764 ft)

Population (2011)
  - Total: 3,306

Languages
  - Official: Hindi
- Time zone: UTC+5:30 (IST)

Chandan is a village in Jaisalmer district from Indian state in Rajasthan.
