= Abapura =

- Town
- Location within Rajasthan
- Coordinates: 23.4383443°N 74.5188207°E
- Country: India
- Indian state: Rajasthan
- Division: Udaipur
- District: Banswara

Government
  - Type: Gram Panchayat

Population (2011)
  - Total: 1,663

Languages
  - Official: Wagri
- Time zone: UTC+5:30 (IST)
- PIN: 327001
- Telephone code: 02962
- Vehicle registration: RJ-03
- Sex ratio: 1110 female per 1000 males (higher than Rajasthan average of 888) ♂/♀

Abapura is a village panchayat located in the Banswara district of the Indian state of Rajasthan. It belongs to Udaipur Division.

== Geography ==
It is located 14 km south of District headquarters Banswara and 16 km from Banswara.

== Transport ==
The nearest railway station to Abapura is Bhairongarh which is located in and around 41.9 kilometer distance. Ratlam Jn Rail Way Station is a major station 60 km away.
