= Fatehgarh, Jaisalmer =

City in Rajasthan, India

Fatehgarh (फतेहगढ़)
- City
- Country: India
- State: Rajasthan
- District: Jaisalmer

Area
  - Total: 4,340 km^{2} (1,680 sq mi)

Population (2011)
  - Total: 101,020
- Time zone: UTC+5:30 (IST)
- PIN: 345027

Fatehgarh is city and Tehsil in Jaisalmer district in Rajasthan. It is situated 85 km away from district headquarter Jaisalmer.

== Demographics ==
Fatehgarh tehsil has a population of 1,01,020 peoples according to Census 2011.Fatehgarh tehsil has a population density of 23 inhabitants per square kilometre.
