= Raipur, Jhalawar =

Raipur
- Tehsil
- Location in Rajasthan, India Raipur (India)
- Coordinates: 24°36′34″N 76°17′50″E
- Country: India
- State: Rajasthan
- District: Jhalawar
- Elevation: 329 m (1,079 ft)

Languages
  - Official: Hindi
- Time zone: UTC+5:30 (IST)
- Postal code: 326036
- Area code: 07434
- Vehicle registration: RJ17

Raipur is a Tehsil in Jhalawar district in the Indian state of Rajasthan. There are a high school at main road, who is center of all surrounding villages. [Last Update Dipanshu Soni 2026-11-13T11:46:32]

== Geography ==
Raipur is located 30 kilometres (19 mi) south of the District headquarters at Jhalawar, 31 kilometres (19 mi) from Pirawa and 334 kilometres (208 mi) from the state capital at Jaipur.

It has an average elevation of 329 metres (1,079 ft).
