= Bhinai =

Town in Rajasthan, India

- City
- Location in Rajasthan, India Bhinai (India)
- Coordinates: 26.0640945°N 74.7604763°E
- Country: India
- State: Rajasthan
- District: Ajmer

Government
  - Type: Rajasthan government

Area
  - Total: 895.78 km^{2} (345.86 sq mi)
- Elevation: 433 m (1,421 ft)
  - Rank: 13th in Rajasthan

Languages - Marwari, Rajasthani, Hindi, English
- Time zone: UTC+5:30 (IST)
- PIN: 305801, 305802
- Telephone code: 01463
- ISO 3166 code: RJ-IN

Bhinay is a town in Bhinay Tehsil in Ajmer district of Rajasthan State, India. It is located in Ajmer Division.

== History ==
Historically, Bhinai was an Istimrari estate under the Rathore dynasty's Jodha clan. The estate was founded by Rao Agar Sen, the younger son of Rao Chandrasen of Marwar. In 1783, the title of Raja was conferred upon the head of the Bhinai house by the then Chief of Jodhpur as a reward for military service.
