= Nayagaon, Rajasthan =

Nayagaon
- village
- Location in Rajasthan, India Nayagaon (India)
- Coordinates: 23.9809789°N 73.4978332°E
- Country: India
- State: Rajasthan
- District: Udaipur

Population
  - Total: 6,000+

Languages
  - Official: Hindi
- Time zone: UTC+5:30 (IST)
- ISO 3166 code: RJ-IN
- Vehicle registration: RJ-
- Nearest city: Udaipur, Dungarpur

Nayagaon is a village of Nayagaon Tehsil in the Udaipur District of Rajasthan, India.

== History ==
Nayagaon was established around Approx 170 years ago, by the Jain community from various areas like Dungarpur and some from Gujarat and other nearby places. There are many other communities which stays in Nayagaon and in its surroundings called Bhil Samaj and Vaisnav Samaj, which includes sub categories like Bhil, Panchal, Bunker, Meghval, Kumhar etc.

== Geography ==
Nayagaon is situated in the Udaipur district in south Rajasthan and very close to the border with Gujarat.

== Education facility ==
Nayagaon has one senior secondary school, one middle school for girls, one Jain samaj Trust owned School (both Hindi and English medium), one mahatma Gandhi school and one College.
