= List of cities and towns in Rajasthan =

Largest state in India, Rajasthan

Rajasthan is the largest state in terms of area and the seventh most populous state in India through having a low population density. Jaipur is the largest and most populated metropolitan area in Rajasthan. Jodhpur, Kota and Bikaner being in order. Bhiwadi, Alwar and Udaipur are the cities with the most growth in recent years in both terms of population and area. The population projections are calculated using geometric increase, excluding Bhiwadi. By 2031, the state may have five cities with populations above one million, three cities over two million and one with over five million people. Bharatpur is considered as the eastern gateway of Rajasthan.

No.	Category.	2031.	2021	Note.
1	Population above 100,000.	35	35	Nagar Palika
2	Population above 500,000.	09	07	Mahanagar Palika
3	Population above 1 Million.	05	03	Metropolitan City
4	Population above 1.5 Million.	04	02	Metropolitan City
5	Population above 2 Million.	02	02	Metro City
6	Population above 3 Million.	02	01	Metro City
7	Population above 5 Million.	01	00	Mega City

Population of major cities in Rajasthan
S.No.	City	Population (2031) Projected	Population (2021) Projected	Population (2011)	Population (2001)	Population (1991)	Area (km²)
1	Jaipur	5,239,000	3,995,182	3,046,163	2,322,575	1,518,235	484.64
2	Jodhpur	1,590,000	1,295,906	1,056,191	860,818	666,279	233.42
3	Kota	2,032,000	1,426,994	1,001,694	703,150	542,000	221.36
4	Bikaner	953,000	783,966	644,406	529,690	416,289	270.03
5	Ajmer	662,000	599,592	542,321	490,520	402,700	84.50
6	Udaipur	605,000	522,525	451,100	389,438	308,571	56.92
7	Bhilwara	592,000	461,318	359,483	280,128	183,965	73.00
8	Alwar	442,000	373,639	315,379	266,203	210,146	48.40
9	Bharatpur	381,000	310,261	252,342	205,235	156,880	56.83
10	Sikar	387,000	303,463	237,532	185,925	148,272	39.66
11	Pali	345,000	282,105	230,075	187,641	136,842	43.16
12	Sri Ganganagar	227,000	226,219	224,532	222,858	161,482	43.35
13	Tonk	245,000	201,358	165,294	135,689	100,079	60.50
14	Kishangarh	234,000	190,423	154,886	125,981	106,721	45.49
15	Hanumangarh	204,000	175,896	150,958	129,556	82,733	13.42
16	Beawar	194,000	168,052	145,504	125,981	106,721	55.00
17	Dholpur	209,000	162,311	125,989	97,795	68,533	32.03
18	Churu	180,000	147,146	119,856	97,627	71,631	41.00
19	Sawai Madhopur	204,000	157,441	121,106	97,491	72,135	59.00
20	Gangapur City	200,000	154,522	119,090	96,794	53,689	52.31
21	Jhunjhunu	118,000	118,473	118,473	118,473	72,187	50.00
22	Baran	200,000	176,980	117,992	78,665	57,719	32.00
23	Chittorgarh	170,000	140,828	116,406	96,219	71,569	32.90
24	Hindaun	105,000	105,452	105,452	105,452	84,784	31.80
25	Bhiwadi	1,500,000	136,000	104,921	151,844	88,881	44.06
26	Bundi	103,000	103,286	103,286	103,286	88,871	31.00
27	Nagaur	102,000	102,872	102,872	102,872	88,313	30.00
28	Sujangarh	101,000	101,523	101,523	101,523	83,808	20.50
29	Banswara	99,000	99,969	99,969	99,969	85,638	17.39
30	Barmer	96,000	96,225	96,225	96,225	83,517	23.00

== Notes ==
The 1991, 2001 and 2011 population figures are based on Census of India town-level data. The Office of the Registrar General & Census Commissioner, India provides Rajasthan town directories and population datasets for these census years. The 2001 Town Directory also contains town area and historical population data.

The 2021 and 2031 figures are projections calculated from the 2001–2011 growth trend and are not official Census counts or official Government of India forecasts.
