= Jhalawar district =

Coordinates: 24°36′N 76°09′E

- District of Rajasthan
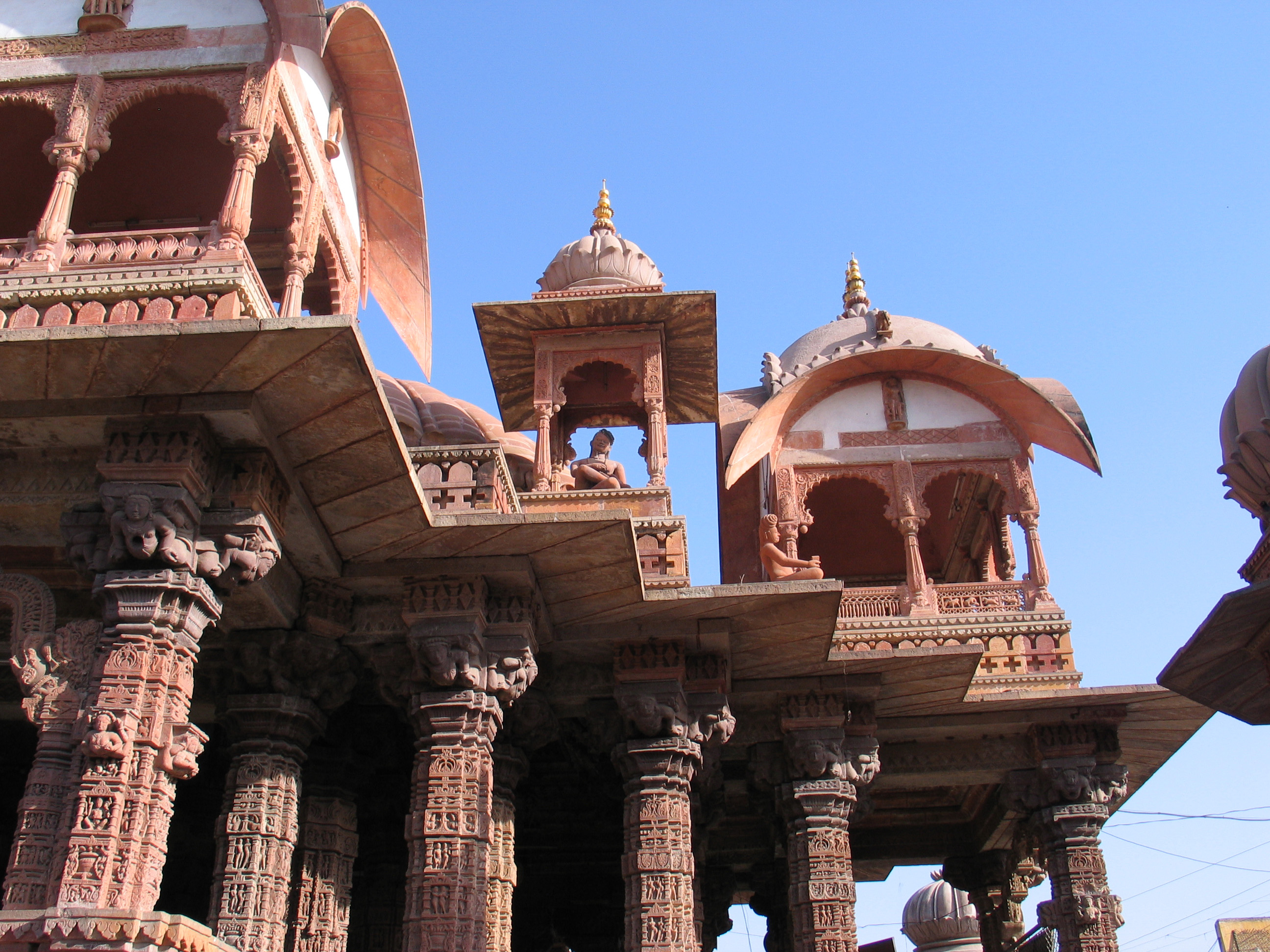
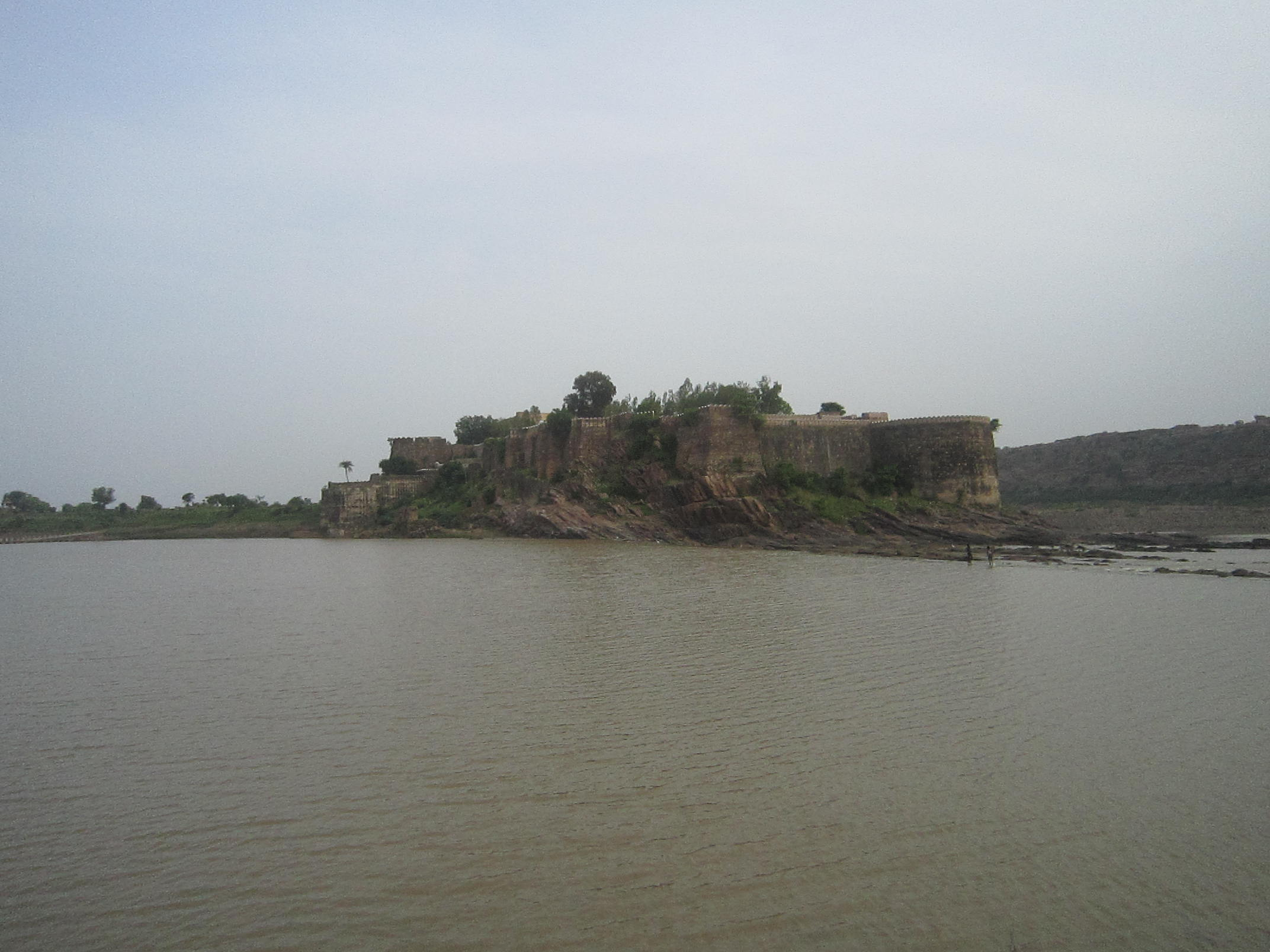
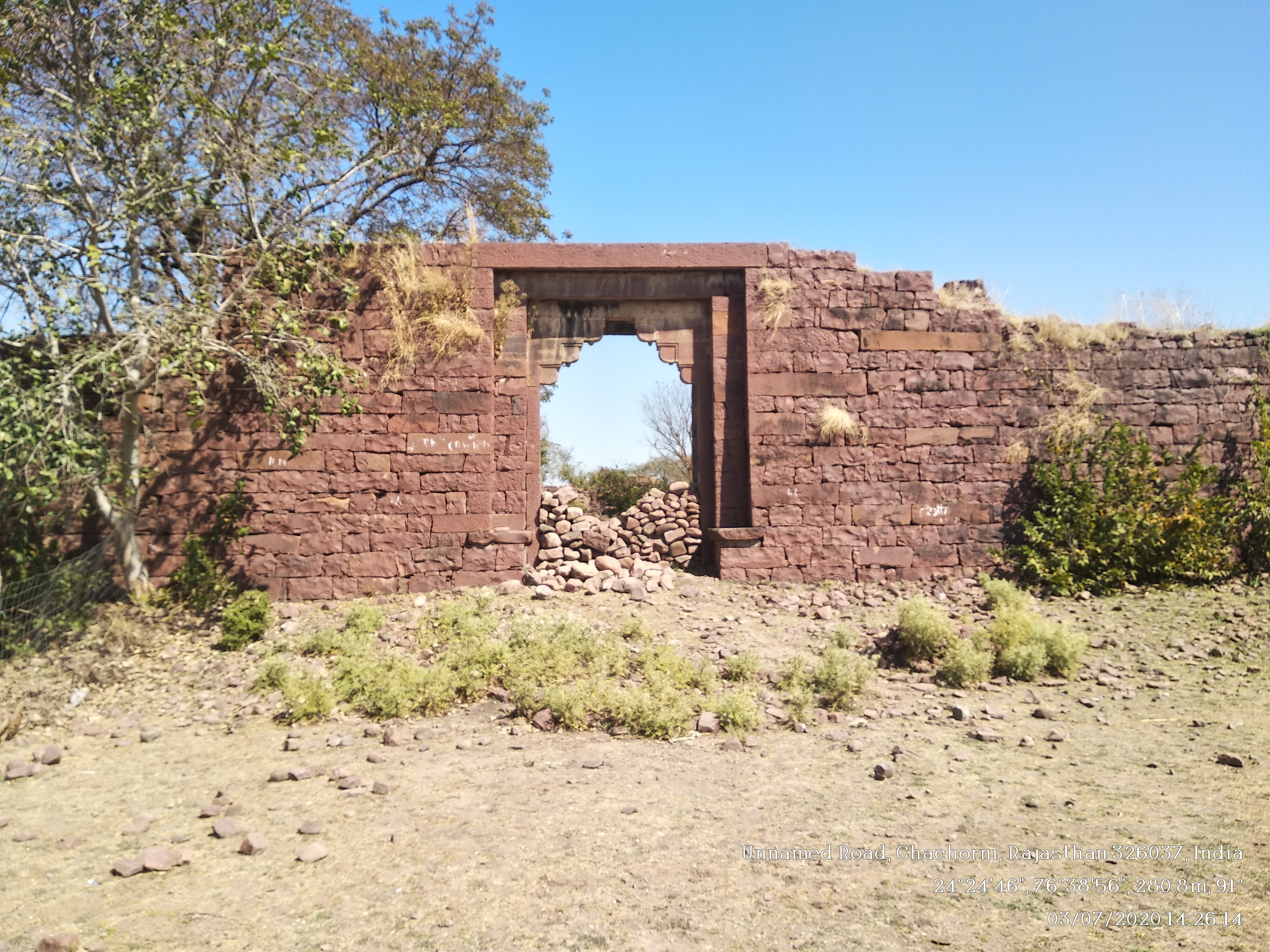
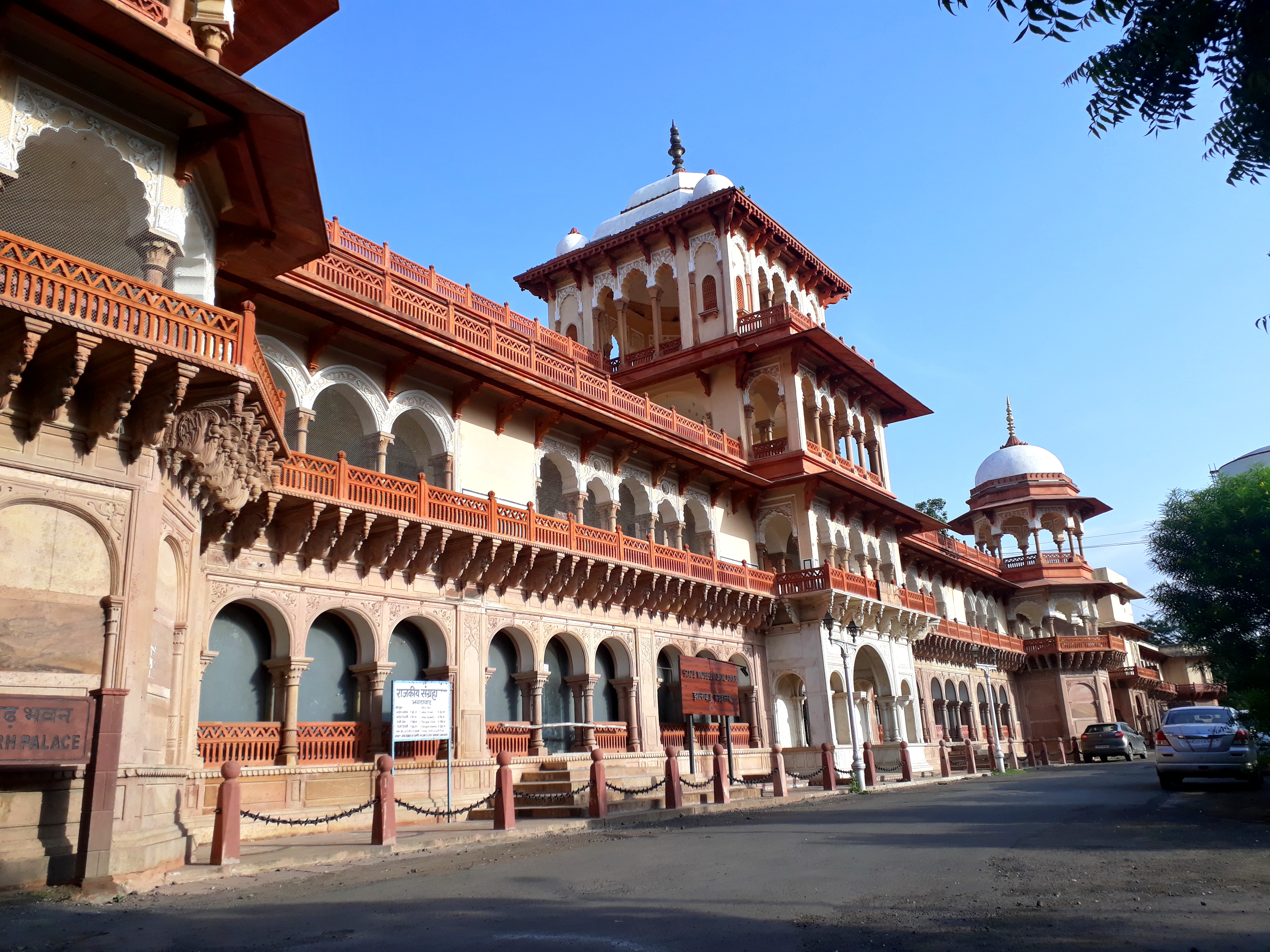
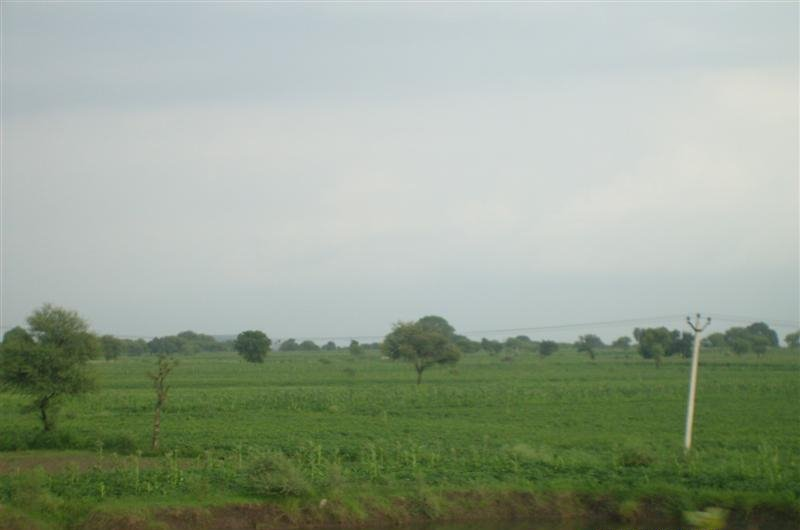
- Clockwise from top-left: Jhalrapatan Sun Temple, Gagron Fort from the Kali Sindh River, Garh Palace in Jhalawar, fields in Aklera, Fort in Chachorni

- Location of Jhalawar district in Rajasthan
- Coordinates: 24.597349, 76.160980
- Country: India
- State: Rajasthan
- Division: Kota
- Headquarters: Jhalawar

Government
  - District Collector: Shri Ajay Singh Rathore (IAS)

Area
  - Total: 6,928 km^{2} (2,675 sq mi)

Population (2011)
  - Total: 1,411,129
  - Density: 203.7/km^{2} (527.5/sq mi)
- Time zone: UTC+05:30 (IST)

Jhalawar district is one of the 50 districts of Rajasthan state in western India. The historical city of Jhalawar is the administrative headquarters of the Jhalawar district. The district is bounded on the northwest by Kota district, on the northeast by Baran district, on the east by Guna district of Madhya Pradesh state, on the south by Rajgarh district and Agar Malwa district of Madhya Pradesh state and on the west by Ratlam district and Mandsaur district of Madhya Pradesh state. The district occupies an area of 6,219 km². The district is part of Kota division. To know more about Jhalawar City.

== Origin of name ==
The name of the district is derived from the erstwhile princely state of Jhalawar (which literally means the abode of the Jhalas, a Rajput clan).

== History ==
The territory of the present district belonged to the princely state of Jhalawar till India's independence in 1947.

== Geography ==
The district lies in the Hadoti region in southeast Rajasthan, on the edge of Malwa Plateau. The Kali Sindh River flows northward through the center of the district.

== Economy ==
In 2006 the Ministry of Panchayati Raj named Jhalawar one of the country's 250 most backward districts (out of a total of 640). It is one of the twelve districts in Rajasthan currently receiving funds from the Backward Regions Grant Fund Programme (BRGF).

== Divisions ==
The district is divided into eight sub-divisions by the government of Rajasthan

- Jhalawar
- Aklera
- Asnawar
- Gangdhar
- Bhawani Mandi
- Pirawa
- Khanpur
- Manohar Thana.

== Tehsils ==
There are 12 tehsil headquarters in Jhalawar district. The tehsils of district are:

- Aklera
- Asnawar
- Gangdhar
- Jhalrapatan
- Khanpur
- Manoharthana
- Pachpahar
- Pirawa
- Sunel
- Raipur
- Bakani
- Dag

== Demographics ==
Historical population
| Year | Pop. | ±% p.a. |
|---|---|---|
| 1901 | 253,651 | — |
| 1911 | 301,449 | +1.74% |
| 1921 | 299,617 | −0.06% |
| 1931 | 330,140 | +0.97% |
| 1941 | 374,596 | +1.27% |
| 1951 | 405,036 | +0.78% |
| 1961 | 491,872 | +1.96% |
| 1971 | 623,763 | +2.40% |
| 1981 | 784,998 | +2.33% |
| 1991 | 956,971 | +2.00% |
| 2001 | 1,180,323 | +2.12% |
| 2011 | 1,411,129 | +1.80% |

Religions in Jhalawar district (2011)
| Religion | Percent |
| Hinduism | 92.11% |
| Islam | 6.81% |
| Jainism | 0.88% |
| Other or not stated | 0.20% |

According to the 2011 census, Jhalawar district has a population of 1,411,129, roughly equal to the nation of Eswatini or the US state of Hawaii. This gives it a ranking of 349th in India (out of a total of 640). The district has a population density of 227 inhabitants per square kilometre (590/sq mi). Its population growth rate over the decade 2001-2011 was 19.57%. Jhalawar has a sex ratio of 945 females for every 1000 males, and a literacy rate of 62.13%. 16.25% of the population lives in urban areas. Scheduled Castes and Scheduled Tribes make up 17.26% and 12.91% of the population respectively.

Languages in Jhalawar district (2011)
1. Hindi (44.5%)
2. Harauti (20.3%)
3. Malvi (18.9%)
4. Sondwari (14.2%)
5. Others (2.05%)

At the time of the 2011 census, 44.46% of the population spoke Hindi, 20.34% Harauti, 18.91% Malvi and 14.24% Sondwari as their first language.
