= Sanoda, Kotkasim =

Sanoda
- Village
- Location in Rajasthan, India Sanoda (India)
- Coordinates: 27.98°N 76.70°E
- Country: India
- State: Rajasthan
- District: Alwar
- Tehsil: Kotkasim

Population (2011)
  - Total: 789

Languages
  - Official: Hindi हिंदी
  - Spoken: Ahirwati अहीर्वती
- PIN: 301702
- Telephone code: 01493
- Vehicle registration: RJ-40
- Lok Sabha constituency: Alwar
- Vidhan Sabha constituency: Kishangarh

Sanoda is a village in Kotkasim tehsil Alwar District in the state of Rajasthan, India.

Sanoda is a part of the Ahirwal region and about 75 percent of the total population are Yadav. Most of the Yadavs belong to the gotra (clan) of the Pachwaniya and Dagar.

== Education ==
Sanoda has higher literacy rate compared to Rajasthan. In 2011, literacy rate of Sanoda village was 76.49% compared to 66.11% of Rajasthan. In Sanoda Ahir Male literacy stands at 91.62% while female literacy rate was 60.12%.

- Govt UP School (GUPS) Sanoda Ahir, Kotkasim, Alwar, Rajasthan.

== Location ==
Sanoda is located in the National Capital Region, 130 kilometres south of Delhi, 145 kilometres north of state capital Jaipur, 60 kilometres north of Alwar city, 30 kilometres east of Rewari city, 25 kilometres south of Dharuhera, 25 kilometres south of Bhiwadi and 22 kilometres west of Tijara, 20 kilometres north Kishangarh Bas, 5 kilometres south of Kotkasim, 4 kilometres north of Bibirani, another town in Alwar district.

Villages near Sanoda are Pur(1.8 km), Khanpur Dagran(2 km), Gheekaka(1.5 km), Chachiyawas (1 km) Moonpur Thakran(1.2 km), Jalaka(1 km). It is on the border of the Alwar District and Rewari District. Rewari District Bawal is west towards this place . It is near to the Haryana State Border.

== Population ==
Sanoda is a medium size village located in Kotkasim of Alwar district, Rajasthan with total 145 families residing. The Sanoda village has population of 789 of which 422 are males while 367 are females as per the 2011 census.

The population of children with age 0-6 is 100 which makes up 12.67% of total population of village. Average Sex Ratio of Sanoda village is 870 which is lower than Rajasthan state average of 928. Child Sex Ratio for the Sanoda Ahir as per census is 563, lower than Rajasthan average of 888.

Scheduled Castes constituted 17.40% while Scheduled Tribes were 0.51% of total population.
