= Moonpur Thakran =

- Village
- Location in Rajasthan, India Moonpur Thakran (India)
- Coordinates: 28.03°N 76.72°E
- Country: India
- State: Rajasthan
- District: Alwar
- Tehsil: Kotkasim
- Elevation: 263 m (863 ft)

Population (2011)
  - Total: 496

Languages
  - Official: Hindi
  - Spoken: Ahirwati
- PIN: 301702
- Telephone code: 01493
- Vehicle registration: RJ-02
- Vidhan Sabha constituency: Kishangarh Bas
- Website: alwar.nic.in

Moonpur Thakran is a village in Kotkasim tehsil of Alwar District in the state of Rajasthan, India. Moonpur Thakran is a part of the Ahirwal region.

== Location ==
Moonpur Thakran is located in the National Capital Region, 130 kilometres south of Delhi, 145 kilometres north of state capital Jaipur, 60 kilometres north of Alwar city, 30 kilometres east of Rewari city, 25 kilometres south of Dharuhera, 25 kilometres south of Bhiwadi and 22 kilometres west of Tijara, 20 kilometres north Kishangarh Bas, 5 kilometres south of Kotkasim, 4 kilometres north of Bibirani, another town in Alwar district.

Villages near Moonpur Thakran are Pur(1 km), Khanpur Dagran(1 km), Gheekaka(2 km), Sanoda Ahir(1 km), Jalaka(0.7 km).
