= Khanpur Dagran =

- Village
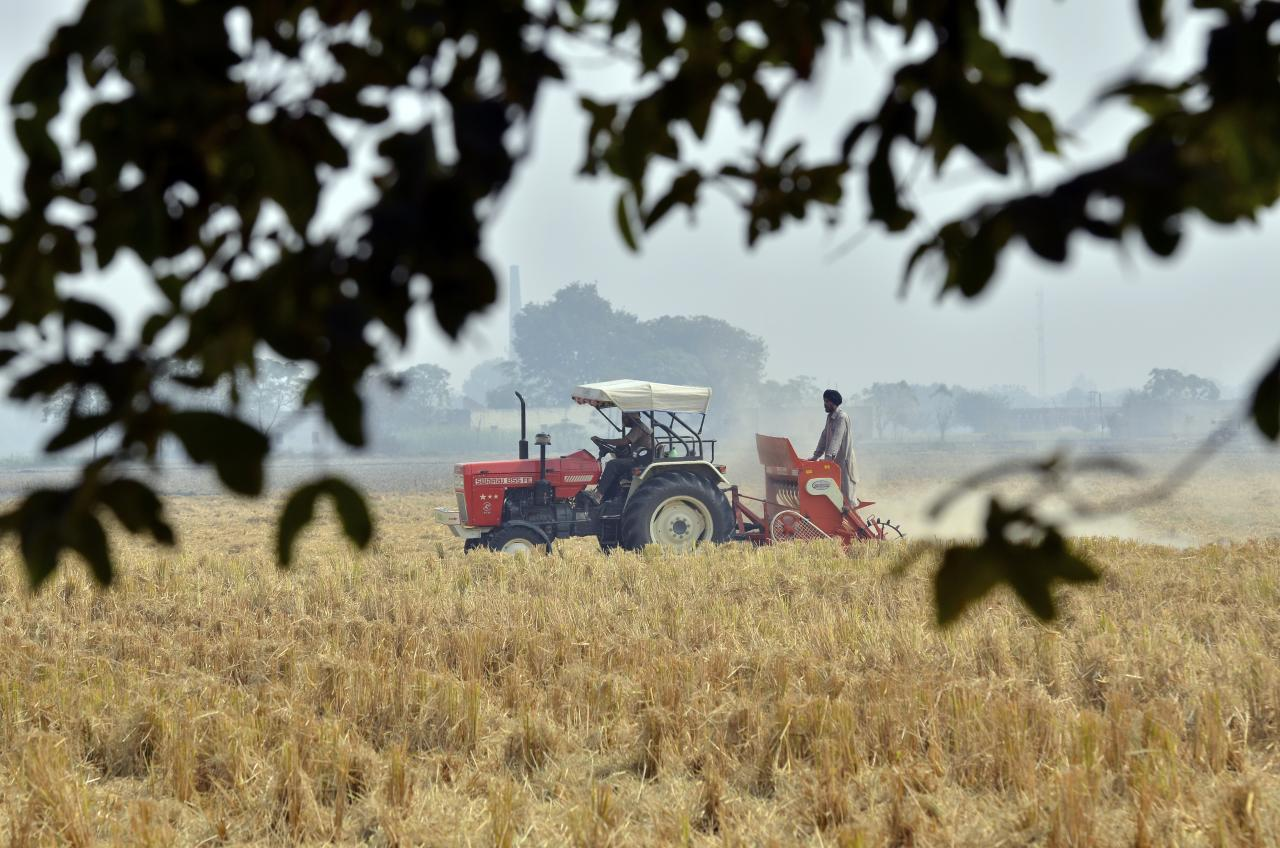

- Location in Rajasthan, India Khanpur Dagran (India)
- Coordinates: 27.99°N 76.69°E
- Country: India
- State: Rajasthan
- District: Alwar
- Tehsil: Kotkasim
- Elevation: 273 m (896 ft)

Population (2016)
  - Total: 1,600

Languages
  - Official.: Hindi
- Time zone: UTC+5:30 (IST)
- PIN: 301702
- Telephone code: 01493
- ISO 3166 code: RJ-IN
- Vehicle registration: RJ-02
- Lok Sabha constituency: Alwar
- Vidhan Sabha constituency: Kishangarh Bas
- RTO: Bhiwadi

Khanpur Dagran, Khanpur Aheeran, Khanpur Ahir is a village in Kotkasim tehsil Alwar District in the state of Rajasthan, India. Khanpur Dagran part of Ahirwal and about 85 percent of the total population are Yadav. Most of the Yadavs belong to the gotra(clan) of the Dagar. The main language spoken in Ahirwati.

== Location ==
Khanpur Dagran is located in the National Capital Region, 130 kilometres south of Delhi, 145 kilometres north of state capital Jaipur, 60 kilometres north of Alwar city, 30 kilometres east of Rewari city, 25 kilometres south of Dharuhera, 25 kilometres south of Bhiwadi and 22 kilometres west of Tijara, 20 kilometres north Kishangarh Bas, 5 kilometres south of Kotkasim, 4 kilometres north of Bibirani, another town in Alwar district. Villages near Khanpur Dagran are Badsara(1 km), Kheri(1 km), Chachiyawas (1 km), Pur(2 km), Sanoda Ahir (1.5 km), Gheekaka(3 km), Moonpur Thakran(1 km), Jalaka(1.8 km).

This Place is in the border of the Alwar District and Rewari District. Rewari District Bawal is west towards this place . It is near to the Haryana State Border.

== Education ==
SCHOOL

- SUBHAM UP SCHOOL KHANPUR

(Address : Khanpur Dagran, Kotkasim, Alwar, Rajasthan)

- RAM VIDYA MANDIR SHIKSHAN SANS

(Address : Khanpur Dagran, Kotkasim, Alwar, Rajasthan)

- GOVT. UP SCHOOl KHANPUR

(Address : Khanpur Dagran, Kotkasim, Alwar, Rajasthan)
