= Mundawar =

- Town, nagar palika
- Location in Rajasthan, India Mundawar (India)
- Coordinates: 27.8607°N 76.5522°E
- Country: India
- State: Rajasthan
- District: Khairthal-Tijara
- Tehsil: Mundawar
- Elevation: 263 m (863 ft)

Population (2011)
  - Total: 231,628

Languages
  - Official: Hindi, Ahirwati
  - Spoken: Rajasthani, Ahirwati
- Time zone: UTC+5:30 (IST)
- PIN: 301407
- Telephone code: 01495
- ISO 3166 code: RJ-IN
- Vehicle registration: RJ-02
- Sub-District Code: 00494
- Sex ratio: 904♀/♂
- Vidhan Sabha constituency: Mundawar
- Assembly MLA: Lalit Yadav
- Website: alwar.rajasthan.gov.in

Mundawar is a town and tehsil in Khairthal - Tijara district in Indian state of Rajasthan. Mundawar is 15 km from Khairthal city.

== Geography ==
Mundawar is situated at latitude 38 16' 58" N and longitude 77° 9' 39" E in northern part of Alwar district of Rajasthan at an elevation of 263 m.

== Location ==
Mundawar town is located in the National Capital Region, 125 km south of Delhi, 140 km north of state capital Jaipur, 39.5 km north of Alwar city, 28 km east of Behror 25 km east of Rewari city, 70 km south of Dharuhera, 65 km south of Bhiwadi and 20 km north of Tijara, another town in Alwar district.

It is easily reached from NH8 (Delhi-Jaipur-Mumbai highway) via Behror. Regular buses connect Mundawar to Behror, Khairthal, Rewari, Dharuhera, Bhiwadi, Tijara and Alwar.

== Demography ==
Mundawar is a town with population of under 15000 in 2011 census.

Near by villages are Shyopur (1.5 km) Garhi (3.5 km) Tinkirudi (4 km), Siya Khoh (6 km), Chakoliya (10 km), Padmara Khurdh (15 km), Ulaheri (3.6 km), Chandpur (5.3 km), Khanpur Ahir (5.4 km). Nearest Towns are Kishangarh Bas (15 km), Doonwas (18 km), Neemrana (21.3 km), Kotkasim (22.7 km), Behror (28 km). Sabalgarh ( 4 km ), (Pipli (7 km.)

== Language ==
Rajasthani Ahirwati, also called ‘Hirwati’ (the language of Ahirs), is spoken in Ahirwal region.

Rewari, Mahendergarh, Narnaul, Gurgaon, Kotkasim, Kotputli, Bansur, Behror and Mundawar may be considered as the centre of Rajasthani Ahirwati speaking area.

== Nearby Cities ==
- Bawal 25 km,
- Alwar 45 km,
- Rewari 41 km,
- Narnaul 45 km.
- Behror 28 km
- Khairthal 15 km

== Nearby Taluks ==
- Kishangarh Bas 23 km,
- Bawal 30 km,
- Neemrana 25 km,
- Behror 28 km

== Villages in Mundawar Tehsil ==
- Agwani
- Ajarka
- Alipur
- Amoth
- Azizpur
- Badheen
- Badli
- Balloowas
- Bapdoli
- Bari
- Basni
- Bawad
- Beejwad Chauhan
- Beerod
- Behroj
- Behror Jat
- Bhagola Aheer
- Bhagolajat
- Bhajanawas
- Bhanot
- Bheekhawas
- Bheenwada
- Bhojpuri
- Bhoongara Aheer
- Bhoongara Thethar
- Birsangwas
- Birtoli
- Chakoliya
- Chandpur
- Cheeruni
- Chhabriwas
- Chhapur
- Choodla
- Dadhiya
- Dantla
- Darbarpur
- Dhailawas
- Dhokal Nagar
- Doonwas
- Gadli
- Gadoowas
- Gandhi Nagar
- Garhi
- Gola Hera
- Gopipura
- Hada Heri
- Hatoondi
- Hulmana Kalan
- Hulmana Khurd
- Ikrotiya
- Jagiwara
- Jalawas
- Jalpiwas
- Jasai
- Jeendoli
- Jeevan Singhpura
- Jhajharpur
- Jogawad
- Kadar Nagar
- Kali Pahari
- Kalooka
- Karni Kot
- Khanpur Mewan
- Khanpuraheer
- Khareta
- Khohri
- Khushalwas
- Kokawas
- Lakheempur
- Lamachpur
- Majra
- Majri Bhanda
- Majri Khola
- Mandha
- Manethi
- Manka
- Mator
- Mau
- Menpur
- Mirzapur
- Mohammadpur
- Molawas
- Mundanwara Kalan
- Mundanwara Khurd
- Mundawar
- Mundiyakhera
- Munpur
- Nahar Khera
- Nangal Baola
- Nangal Raniya
- Nangal Santokara
- Nangal Singal
- Nangal Siya
- Nangal Udiya
- Nangali Ojha
- Naredi
- Padmara Kalan
- Padmara Khurd
- Palawa
- Peepli
- Pehal
- Phusa Pur
- Qyara
- Radwa
- Raipur
- Rajwara
- Rambas
- Ramsinghpura
- Ranoth
- Rasgan
- Renagiri
- Rundh
- Sabalgarh
- Sanchod
- Sanoli
- Sarai Kalan
- Seel Gaon
- Seel Gaon Khurd
- Shahjadpur
- Shahpur
- Shamda
- Shekhawas
- Shital Pur
- Shreekrishan Nagar
- Shyopur
- Sihali Kalan
- Sihali Khurd
- Sirod Kalan
- Sirod Khurd
- Siya Khoh
- Sodawas
- Sorkha Kalan
- Sorkha Khurd
- Suheta
- Sukhman Heri
- Sundarwari
- Surajpura
- Swaroop Sarai
- Tatarpur
- Tehadka
- Tehadki
- Tejpura
- Tinkiruri
- Todarpur
- Ulaheri
- Vijay Nagar

== Nearby airports ==
- Indira Gandhi International Airport, New Delhi 112 km
- Jaipur International Airport, Sanganer, Jaipur 150 km

== Nearby tourist places ==
- Neemrana 25 km,
- Alwar 40 km,
- Narnaul 52 km,
- Nuh 57 km,
- Sariska 63 km,
- Manesar 73 km.

== Nearby districts ==
- Alwar 38 km,
- Rewari 40 km,
- Mewat 46 km,
- Mahendragarh 66 km.

== Nearby railway stations ==
Khanpur Ahir Railway Station 5 km,

Harsauli Railway Station 7 km, Ajaraka Railway Station 10 km, Khairthal Railway Station 14 km.
