= Rabarka =

Village in Rajasthan, India

Coordinates: 28°07′00″N 76°44′51″E

Rabarka or Rabadka (राबड़का) is a village in the Tijara tehsil of the Khairthal-Tijara district (earlier Alwar district) in Rajasthan, India. It is located on the Rajasthan-Haryana border, and is part of the Ahirwal region. Ahir(Heer) of Rabad (राबड़) gotra (clan) live in the village. The main language(dialect) spoken is Ahirwati.
