= Nasopur =

- Location within Rajasthan Location within India
- Coordinates: 28.080498°N 76.792686°E
- Country: India
- State: Rajasthan
- District: Alwar
- Elevation: 268 m (879 ft)

Population (2011)
  - Total: 2,190

Languages
  - Official: Hindi
- Time zone: UTC+5:30 (IST)
- PIN: 301707
- Telephone code: +01493
- Vehicle registration: RJ-40
- Nearest city: Bhiwadi
- Lok Sabha constituency: Alwar

Nasopur is a village in Kotkasim, Tehsil Alwar district, in the Indian state of Rajasthan. It is located around 75 km south of Delhi, 75 km north of Alwar, and about 200 km north of Jaipur, the capital of Rajasthan. Nasopur is part of Greater Bhiwadi and National Capital Region (NCR).

== Education ==
Nasopur village has a higher literacy rate compared to Rajasthan. In 2011, the literacy rate of Nasopur village was 82.31% compared to 66.11% in Rajasthan. In Nasopur, male literacy stands at 93.19%, while female literacy holds a lower rate of 70.49%.

Nasopur contains three schools. Two of these schools are funded by the government, and the third is self-financed.

Government funded schools:

- Government Senior Secondary School Nasopur Alwar, Rajasthan,
- Government Primary School Nasopur Alwar, Rajasthan

Self-financed school:

- Neha public school (RBSE) Nasopur

== Population ==
Nasopur village has a population of 2,190. Of these inhabitants, 1,172 are males and 1,018 are females, per the 2011 Population Census. The population of children aged 0–6 is 245, making up 11.19% of the total village. The average sex ratio of Nasopur village is 869, which is lower than Rajasthan state average of 928. Child sex ratio for the Nasopur as per census is 541, lower than Rajasthan average of 888.
Schedule Caste (SC) constitutes 22.37% of the total population in Nasopur village. The village Nasopur currently doesn't have any schedule tribe (ST) population.

== Culture ==
There are currently four temples in Nasopur village:

=== Baba Peer ===
Baba Peer Mandir is located in the west side of the village on Nasopur-BudhiBawal Road, and is the most popular temple in Nasopur village.

=== Shiv Mandir ===
Shiv Mandir is located near Baba Peer Mandir.

=== Baba Ramnath Temple ===
Located in Government Secondary School campus of Nasopur.

=== Aarya Samaj Aasharm ===
Nasopur has a Vaidik Aashram of Arya samaj which is located in the east side of the village.

== Occupations ==
- Education
- Defence
- Agriculture
- Farming
- Government Jobs
- Law Services
- Medical Services

== Transport ==
=== Air ===
The nearest airport is Indira Gandhi International Airport, New Delhi, which is 75 km away. The second nearest airport is Sanganer International Airport, Jaipur, 200 km away from Nasopur.

=== Railway ===
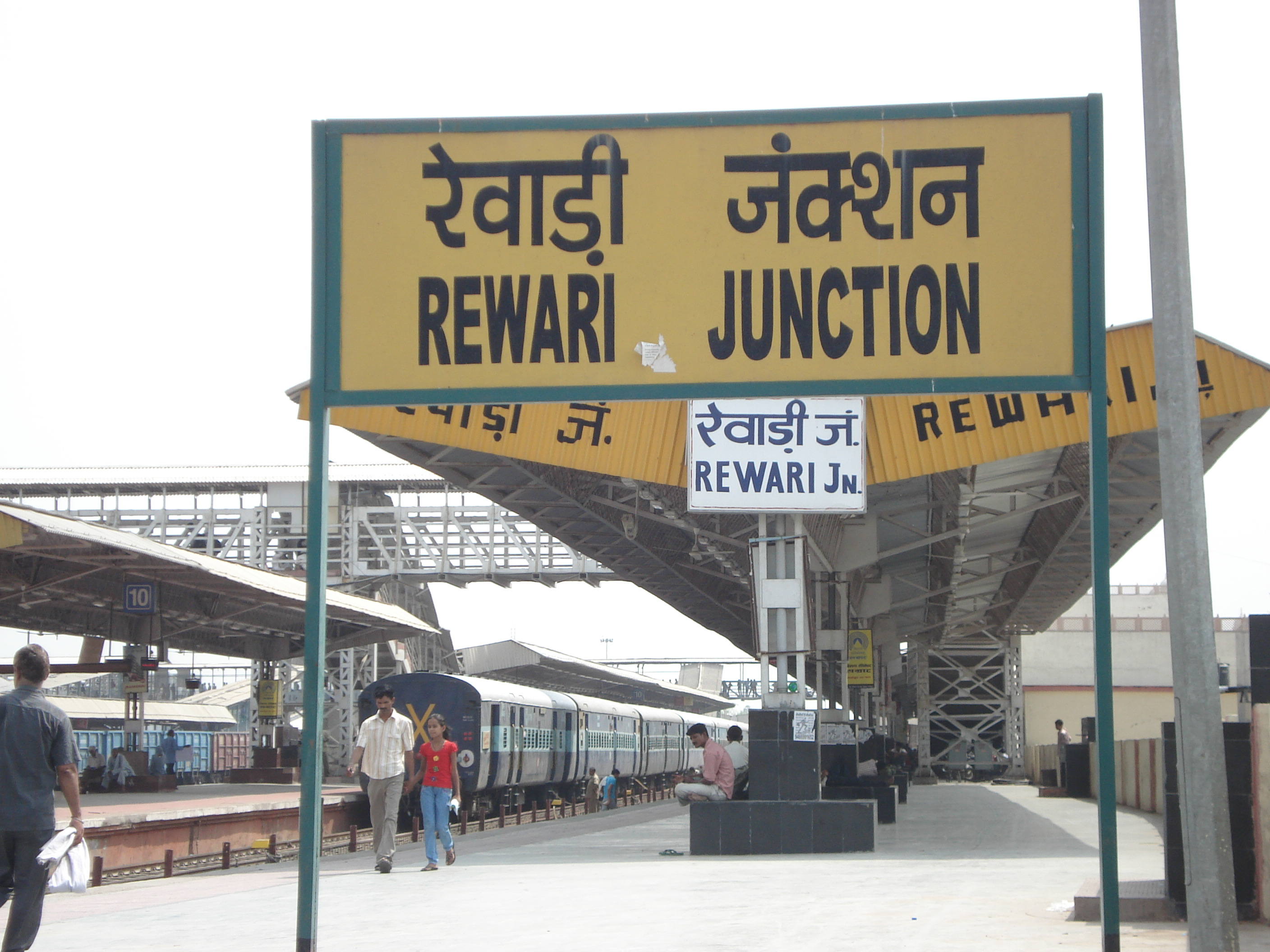
Rewari Railway Station

The nearest main railway station is Rewari. Rewari is a major junction on the Indian railway network and has connections to major cities in India by direct trains. Six railway lines branch out from it to Delhi, Ajmer via Ringas, Ajmer via Alwar, Loharu, Hisar and Rohtak.

Soon, the Yellow Line (Delhi Metro) will be extended to Alwar via Bhiwadi.

=== Road ===
Nasopur is connected by three national highways: NH8 (Delhi-Jaipur-Mumbai) via Gadhi Bolni, Alwar-Bhiwadi Mega Highway via Tapukara, and NH71B (Rewari-Dharuhera-Sohna-Palwal). State highways connect Nasopur to all major towns in Rajasthan and adjacent districts of Haryana.

== Agriculture ==
The most common occupation in Nasopur is farmer. In Kharif season bajra, maize, jowar, karif pulses, arhar, sesamum, cotton, and guar are grown. In Rabi season wheat, barley, gram, mustard, taramira, and rabi pulses are sown. The main source of irrigation is tube wells.
