= Sihali Kalan =

Village in Rajasthan, India

Coordinates: 27.927°N 76.612°E

Sihali Kalan is a small village in the gram panchayat of Sihali Khurd, Mundawar tehsil, Alwar district, Rajasthan, India. It is 10 km from Mandawar and 60 km from Alwar. The nearest town of any size is Khairthal, which is 19 km away.

In the 2011 census the village had a population of 1,261 in 234 households.

The local language is Rajasthani. The two main national political parties are the INC and the BJP.

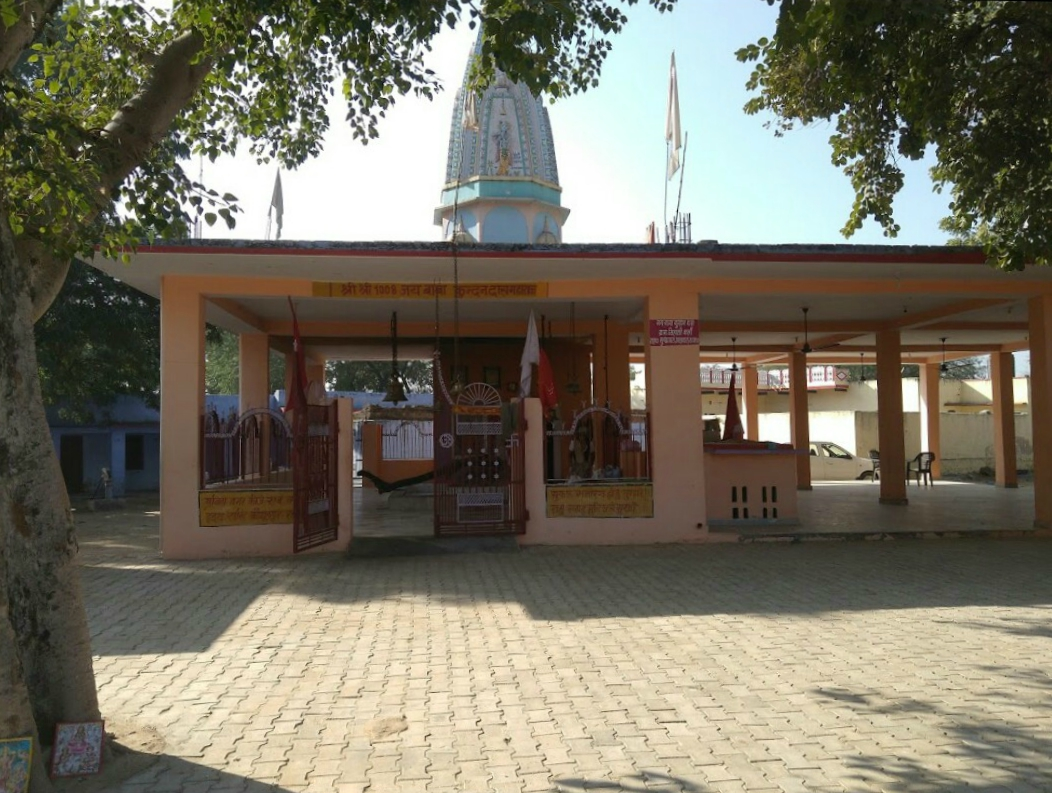
Temple of Baba Kundandas Ji Maharaj

The area of the village is 561 hectares. There is a small co-educational state school in the village, the Government Secondary School Sihali Kalan, and a temple of Baba Kundan Das Maharaj Ji. The "Dhuna" of Baba Kundan Das Maharaj Ji is a place to visit. Liquor is offered to the temple "Dhuna". Every day, many devotees hand over the liquor bottles to the Baba Kundandas Ji Maharaj "Dhuna", and about one-third of the bottle is returned to each devotee as prasāda.

The village is adjacent to a mountain. At the peak of this mountain, there is a temple of Lord Hanuman.
