= Khushkhera =

Industrial Area Khushkhera Khushkhera
- Industrial Area
- Location in Rajasthan, India Industrial Area Khushkhera (India)
- Coordinates: 28°07′08″N 76°47′21″E
- Country: India
- State: Rajasthan
- District: Khairthal-Tijara

Area
  - Total: 3.34 km^{2} (1.29 sq mi)

Languages
  - Official: Hindi, Rajasthani
- Time zone: UTC+5:30 (IST)
- Postal code: 301707

Khushkhera is an industrial area located within the Tijara Tehsil of the Khairthal-Tijara district within the Indian state of Rajasthan. The area falls within the Delhi NCR region.

== Geography ==
Khushkhera is 210 km from Jaipur, 75 km from Alwar, and 45 km from Gurgaon.

== Transport ==
RSRTC, gramin bus, local auto and bus service are available. It lies 60 km from Indira Gandhi International Airport, New Delhi. The nearest railway station is in Rewari, approximately 30 km away.

== See also ==
- Bhiwadi
- Gurgaon
- Rewari
- Neemrana
- National Highway 8 (India)
- Dharuhera
- Bawal
- Behror
