= Deepchand Khairiya =

Indian politician

Member of the Rajasthan Legislative Assembly
- Incumbent
- Assumed office December 2018
- Preceded by: Ramhet Singh Yadav
- Constituency: Kishangarh Bas

Deepchand Khairiya (born 15 January 1941) is an Indian politician from Rajasthan. He is a member of the Rajasthan Legislative Assembly from Kishangarh Bas Assembly constituency in Alwar district. He won the 2023 Rajasthan Legislative Assembly election representing the Indian National Congress.

== Early life and education ==
Khairiya is from Jatka Village in Kishangarh Bas, Alwar district, Rajasthan. He is the son of Badalu Ram. He completed his B.A. and later did LLB in 1967 at University of Rajasthan, Jaipur. Since he has been working as a lawyer in Rajasthan.

== Career ==
Khairiya won from Kishangarh Bas Assembly constituency representing Indian National Congress in the 2023 Rajasthan Legislative Assembly election. He polled 91,916 votes and defeated his nearest rival, Ramhet Singh Yadav of the Bharatiya Janata Party, by a margin of 10,496 votes. He Started his political career as Sarpanch of Mahond Gram panchayat, Later he became Pradhan of Kishangarh Bas Panchayat Samiti twice in 1981 & 1989 and Zila Pramukh of Alwar Zila Parishad in 1982. He first became an MLA winning the 2018 Rajasthan Legislative Assembly election representing BSP. He polled 73,799 votes and defeated Ramhet Singh Yadav of the Bharatiya Janata Party by a margin of 9,916 votes.
