= Majari Bhanda =

- Village
- Interactive map of Majari Bhanda
- Country: India
- State: Rajasthan
- District: Alwar

Population (2011)
  - Total: 1,408

Majari Bhanda is a small village in Mundawar Tehsil in Alwar District of Rajasthan state of India. It comes under Rajwara Gram Panchayat. It belongs to Jaipur division. It is located 38 km to the north of district headquarters Alwar. 149 km from state capital Jaipur. Majari pin code is 301427 and postal office is Rajwara.

== Demographics ==
The Majari village had a total population of 1408 of which 710 were males and 698 were females in the 2011 census.
