= Khera Khurampur =

- Village
- Location in Haryana, India Khera Khurampur (India)
- Coordinates: 28.4455°N 76.78°E
- Country: India
- State: Haryana
- District: Gurgaon

Languages
  - Official: Hindi हिंदी
  - Spoken: Ahirwati अहीर्वती
- Time zone: UTC+5:30 (IST)
- PIN: 122506
- Vehicle registration: HR
- Website: haryana.gov.in

Khera Khurampur is a village in Farrukhnagar in Gurgaon district of Haryana state, India. Farrukhnagar is one of the nine administrative blocks of Gurgaon district situated 21 kilometres (13 mi) from Gurgaon and shares its border with Jhajjar district. Farrukhnagar tehsil is part of Ahirwal Region. Its Pincode is 122506.
