= Khanpur Ahir =

- Town
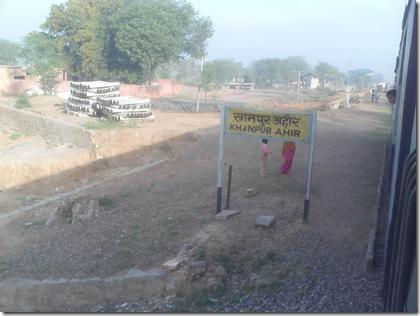

- Location in Rajasthan, India Khanpur Ahir (India)
- Coordinates: 28.03°N 76.72°E
- Country: India
- State: Rajasthan
- District: Khairthal-Tijara
- Elevation: 263 m (863 ft)

Population (2001)
  - Total: 2,000

Languages
  - Official: Hindi, Rajasthani
- Time zone: UTC+5:30 (IST)
- PIN: 301403
- Telephone code: 01495
- ISO 3166 code: RJ-IN
- Sex ratio: ♂/♀

Khanpur Ahir is a village near Khairthal in Mundawar Mandal in Khairthal-Tijara district in the Indian state of Rajasthan. Khanpur Ahir is 15 km (9.3 mi) from its district headquarters Khairthal city. It is 140 km (87 mi) from its state capital, Jaipur.

== Demographics ==
Khanpur Ahir is a small village located in Mundawar tehsil of Khairthal-Tijara district, Rajasthan, India, with total 367 families residing. The village is 15 kilometres (9.3 mi) from the district headquarters at Khairthal and 150 kilometres (93 mi) from the state capital of Jaipur The village has population of 1929, of which 1000 are males, while 929 are females as per Population Census 2011

As of 2011 India census, Khanpur Ahir had a population of 1929 in 352 households. Males (1000) constitute 51.6% of the population and females (929) 48.39%. Khanpur Ahir has an average literacy (1226) rate of 67.96%, less than the national average of 74%: male literacy (729) is 59.46%, and female literacy (497) is 40.53%. In Khanpur Ahir, 10.75% of the population is under 6 years of age (194).

↓
931	873
Male	Female

== Education ==
=== Colleges near Khanpur Ahir ===
- Govt Collage, Mundawar (Alwar)
- Karam Vidhya Mandir Mundawar: Shyopur Circle, Mundawar (Alwar)
- Rat Mahila Mahavidyalaya, Mundawar: Alwar
- Ratandeep Mahila Mahavidyalaya, Kokawas Sodaws: Mundawar, Alwar

=== Schools in Khanpur Aheer ===
- Yadav Pub. Sch. Kahanpur Aheer: khanpur aheer, mundawar, alwar, Rajasthan . PIN- 301403, Post - Harsauli
- Aadarsh Govt. Senior Secondary School Khanpur Ahir: khanpur ahir, mundawar, alwar, Rajasthan . PIN- 301403
- Government School Khanpur Ahir Alwar, Rajasthan,
- Harvest moon public school (CBSE)
- Testnote Online Test Series Exam application office

== Occupations ==
- Education
- Defense
- Agriculture
- Farming
- Government Jobs
- Corporate legal service
- Law Services
- Medical Services

People from this village have rendered their services to defence services viz Indian Army, Indian Navy and Indian Air Force as well as police services.

== Transportation ==
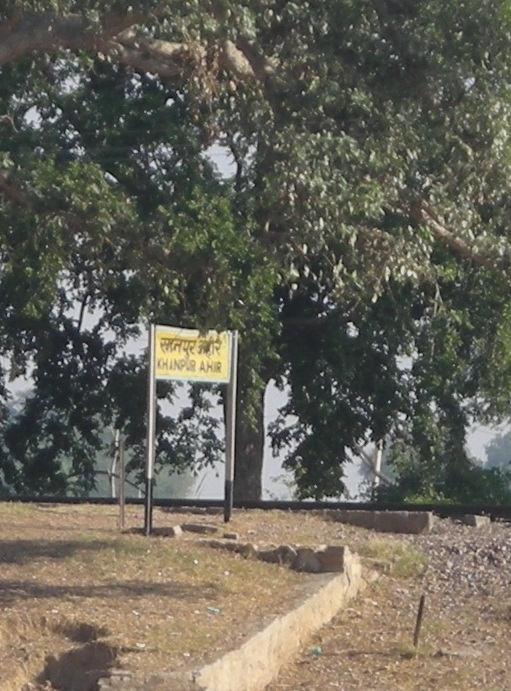
Khanpur Ahir Railway Station

Khanpur Ahir is a village in Khairthal-Tijara district in Rajasthan, and also has a railway station. Khanpur Ahir railway station is administrated by North Western Railways from Jaipur, Rajasthan and established in 1952. The nearest main station is at New Delhi, and the nearest airport is Indira Gandhi International Airport. Gramin bus service many times in a day and Rajasthan roadways service also in the morning and evening

== Agriculture ==
Most of the people of Khanpur Ahir are landlords and farmers.

Khanpur Ahir main occupation is agriculture. In Kharif season Bajra, Maize, Jowar, Karif pulses, Arhar, Sesamum, Cotton, Guar etc. and in Rabi season Wheat, Barley, Gram, Mustard, Taramira, Rabi pulses etc. The main source of irrigation are wells and tube wells. Electric motors and diesel pump sets are being used for Irrigation purposes. The normal rainfall for the district is 657.3 mm. The average rainfall in last ten years in the district is 724 mm. The rainfall distribution in the district is uneven and scattered, which resulted sometimes in flood problems and sometimes drought position which affect the agriculture production as well as cropping pattern in Kharif & Rabi season. Thus, the agriculture in the district by and large depends on rainfall distribution. The average rainfall in 2011 up to September is 217 mm.
