= Jhuljhuli =

- Location in Delhi, India
- Coordinates: 28.539158°N 76.903503°E
- Country: India
- State: Delhi

Languages
  - Official: Hindi
  - Spoken: Ahirwati
- Time zone: UTC+5:30 (IST)
- PIN: 110073

Jhuljhuli is a mid-sized village, located in the district of South West Delhi, in the state of Delhi in India. It has a population of about 1502 persons, and headed by gram panchayat which is headed by elderly's of the village. There are around 279 households in the area. The village is dominated by the people of Yadav community.

Rao Kishan Lal, who was a freedom fighter belonged to this village. He was in Indian National Army, fought against British Government in North Eastern part of India. He was felicitated by Indira Gandhi and one road is also named after him.

Residents Welfare Association-Jhuljhuli is an association based on Jhuljhuli and is working for the betterment of residents of this Village. Moreover, the Shramdaan Team also known as Development Team of this Village has done a tremendous job in the field of Plantation and overall development of Children of this Village

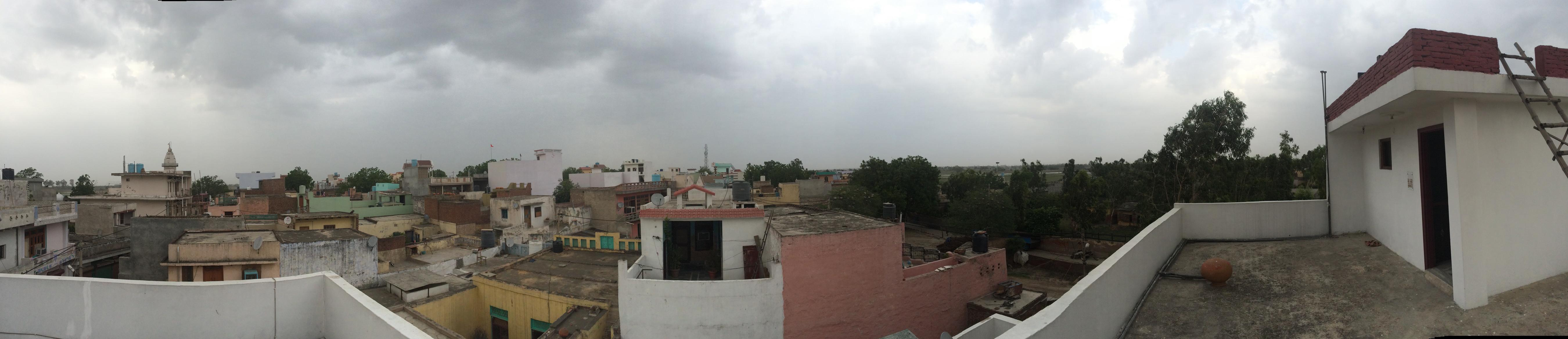

== See also ==
- Jhuljhuli
