= Kishangarh Bas Assembly constituency =

Legislative Assembly constituency in Rajasthan State, India

Coordinates: 27.82°N 76.73°E

Kishangarh Bas
- Constituency No. 60 for the Rajasthan Legislative Assembly

Constituency details
- Country: India
- Region: North India
- State: Rajasthan
- District: Alwar
- Lok Sabha constituency: Alwar
- Established: 2008
- Total electors: 256,777
- Reservation: None

Member of Legislative Assembly
- 16th Rajasthan Legislative Assembly
- Incumbent Deepchand Kheriya
- Party: Indian National Congress
- Elected year: 2023

Kishangarh Bas Assembly constituency is one of the 200 Legislative Assembly constituencies of Rajasthan state in India.

It is part of Alwar district. As of 2023, it is represented by Deepchand Khairiya of the Indian National Congress.

== Members of the Legislative Assembly ==
Year	Member	Party
2008	Ramhet Singh Yadav	Bharatiya Janata Party
2013	Chaudhary Bhagirath Singh ChoyalRamhet singh yadav	Bharatiya Janata Party
2018	Deepchand Khairiya	Indian National Congress
2023	Deepchand Khairiya	Indian National Congress

== Election results ==
=== 2023 ===
2023 Rajasthan Legislative Assembly election: Kishangarh Bas
Party	Candidate	Votes	%	±%
INC	Deepchand Khairiya	91,916	45.48	+23.73
BJP	Ramhet Singh Yadav	81,420	40.29	+4.7
BSP	Simrat Sandhu	23,371	11.56	−29.56
NOTA	None of the above	1,037	0.51	−0.04
Majority		10,496	5.19	−0.34
Turnout		202,089	78.7	+0.98
INC gain from BSP		Swing		

=== 2018 ===
2018 Rajasthan Legislative Assembly election: Kishangarh Bas
Party	Candidate	Votes	%	±%
BSP	Deepchand Khairiya	73,799	41.12	
BJP	Ramhet Singh Yadav	63,883	35.59	
INC	Dr. Karan Singh Yadav	39,033	21.75	
NOTA	None of the above	980	0.55	
Majority		9,916	5.53	
Turnout		179,490	77.72	

== See also ==
- List of constituencies of the Rajasthan Legislative Assembly
- Alwar district
