= Kotkasim =

- City (Nagar Palika)
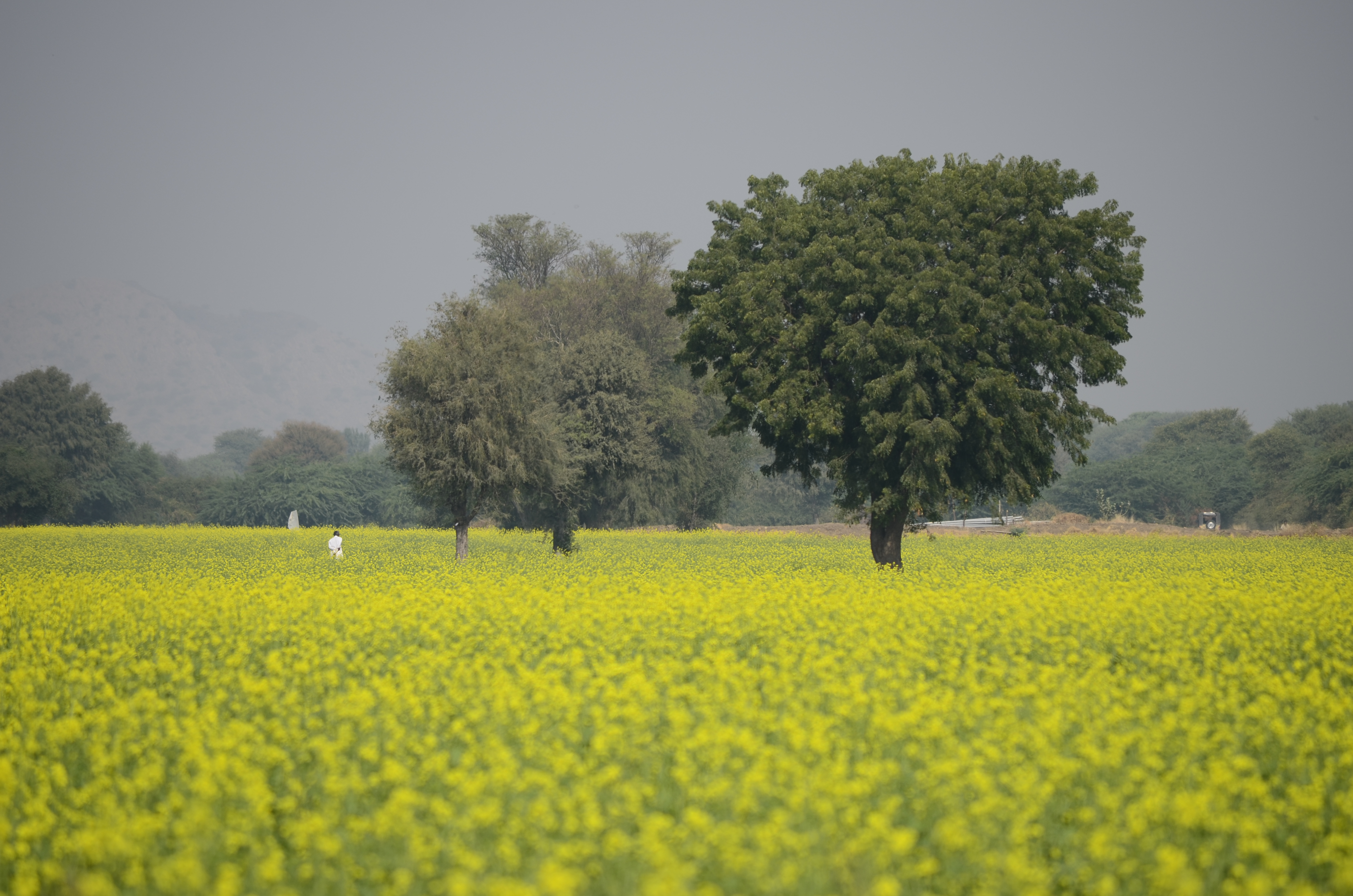
- A mustard farm in Kotkasim in Khairthal-Tijara district (Rajasthan)

- Location in Rajasthan, India Kotkasim (India)
- Coordinates: 28.023763°N 76.718111°E
- Country: India
- State: Rajasthan
- District: Khairthal-Tijara
- Nagar Palika: Kotkasim Airport City
- Elevation: 263 m (863 ft)

Population (2011)
  - Total: 137,339
  - Rank: 2nd largest town in district

Languages
  - Official: Hindi
  - Spoken: Rajasthani, Ahirwati
- PIN: 301702
- Telephone code: 01460
- Vehicle registration: RJ-40
- Lok Sabha constituency: Alwar
- Vidhan Sabha constituency: Kishangarh Bas
- Assembly MLA: DeepChand Khairya
- Lok Sabha Member: Bhupender Yadav

Kotkasim is a City and Nagar Palika, near Tijara City in Khairthal-Tijara district of the Indian state of Rajasthan. The Fort of Kot Kasim came under the Jaipur State.

== Geography ==
Kotkasim is situated at latitude 28° 01' 45" N and longitude 76° 43' 15" E in the northern part of Khairtal district of Rajasthan.

Kotkasim city is a Sub Divisional Headquarter along with an upgraded municipality. It is in the DELHI NCR Capital Region of Khairthal district of Rajasthan state, India. Kotkasim is an education city and & surroundings industrial corridor & Corporate HUB. Khuskhera, Budhibawal, Bawal, Bhiwadi, Chopanki, Tapukara, Neemrana, Kerwa, Khairal. A large number of manufacturing units and factories near the town including, Honda CIAL, Honda Scooter, Shree Cement, Harley Davidson, ASHI India, Minda.... 10 Min Distance from Kotkasim City.

The Kotkasim area falls within a 'Green Zone,' which means that only residential structures may be built there. Currently, four housing developers—namely TSL Building Pvt Ltd, Sunrise Housing Society, and EWS Society—are engaged in the construction of residential flats in this area.

The Nagar Palika Kotaksim has many government offices:

- 1 Government PG college (Bibirani college for general education).
- 1 Government PG college for (government KDM colleges for Sanskrit education).
- 1 Government ITI college.
- 6 Private graduation institutions colleges.
- Electricity Board office (JVVNL) – 2 Power stations one is 220 KV GSS, 2nd 33KV & 2 Sub-power stations.
- 2 Civil Courts & 1 SDM Court presence in Kotkasim.
- Roadways bus stand run by HONDA CIAL Cars.
- PHED office.
- Government Hospital (CHC).
- 4 Government Banks & 2 Semi-Government Banks are working in Kotkasim.
- 1 Government Hostel for girls for BPL.
- Social Welfare Department (Savitri Bai Phule)
- 5 Government SS schools & 16 private education schools are running in Kotkasim.
- Nearest railway station – Rewari (Haryana) Junction 45 min distance from Kotkasim City.
- Nearest highway – National Highway-48 Distance 15 km.
- 2 Mega highways – Kotkasim to Rewari, Kotkasim to Alwar.
- 2 State highways – Kotkasim to Dharuhera & Kotkasim to Mundawar.

== Kotkasim Airport ==
Kotkasim Airport worth Rs 10,669 Cr has been approved by Central Government. Work will start soon after the paperwork. The above project is expected to be completed by 2027.

== Location ==
Kotkasim is located in the National Capital Region, 125 kilometres (78 mi) south of Delhi, 150 kilometres (93 mi) north of state capital Jaipur, 65 kilometres (40 mi) north of Alwar city, 25 kilometres (16 mi) east of Rewari city, 25 kilometres (16 mi) south of Dharuhera, 20 kilometres (12 mi) south of Bhiwadi and 20 kilometres (12 mi) north of Tijara, another town in Alwar district.

It is easily reached from NH8 (Delhi-Jaipur-Mumbai highway) via GarhiBolni village. Regular buses connect KotKasim to Rewari, Gurgaon, Manesar, Kishangarh Bas, Dharuhera, Bhiwadi, Tijara and Alwar.

National Highway NH.08 distance 15 km. Kotkasim town established in Mid of Mega highway Rewari to Alwar, state highway from Mundawar to Kotkasim, state highway Kotkasim to Tijara, Mega Highway Kotkasim to Dharuherea.

== Famous Places ==
- 2 Government PG colleges & 7 Gradation Colleges & 01 govt ITI college are present in the Kotkasim city.
- Kotkasim Post Office and Indian Post Payment Bank.
- Communities center: Ramleela maidan (Made in 20 Hectare land), Shiv Stadium, High School Khel Maidan, Aggarwal Dharmsala, Mahavar Vaishya Bagichi
- Work in progress: International Airport in kotkasim. 2nd Airport In DELHI NCR Region.
- 02 Civil Courts in presence in kotkasim. 01 SDM Court Presence in kotkasim.
- SUB Divisional Headquarters established in 2004 at Kotkasim.

== Demography ==
Kotkasim had a population of 137,339 in the 2011 Census of India.

== Language ==
Hindi & Rajasthani also called Hirwati, is spoken in Ahirwal.

Rewari, Mahendergarh, Narnaul, Gurgaon, Kotkasim, may be considered as the center of Ahirwati speaking area.

== Villages under Kotkasim Tehsil ==
#	Village Name	Gram Panchayat	Nearest Town
1	Aheer Basna	Tiganwa	Khairthal (24 km)
2	Akoli	Ujoli	Rewari (17 km)
3	Alampur	Baghana	Rewari (22 km)
4	Anaka	Kanharka	Rewari (22 km)
5	Badsara	Baghana	Rewari (66 km)
6	Baghana	Baghana	Rewari (26 km)
7	Bagheri Khurd	Bagheri Khurd	Khairthal (14 km)
8	Bairaheri	Bagheri Khurd	Khairthal (17 km)
9	Beelaheri	Beelaheri	Rewari (19 km)
10	Beeliyawas	Beelaheri	Rewari (19 km)
11	Beeranwas	Ujoli	Rewari (17 km)
12	Begampur	Gheekaka	Rewari (26 km)
13	Berawas Kalan	Teuwas	Bhiwadi (20 km)
14	Berawas Khurd	Joriya	Tijara (12 km)
15	Bhamoowas	Bhonkar	Bhiwadi (26 km)
16	Bhojpur	Jatiyana	Alwar (34 km)
17	Bhojrajka	Gunsar	Khairthal (30 km)
18	Bhonkar	Bhonkar	Bhiwadi (25 km)
19	Burhi Bawal	Burhi Bawal	Bhiwadi (25 km)
20	Chachiyawas	Gheekaka	Khairthal (29 km)
21	Chandpura	Tiganwa	Khairthal (25 km)
22	Chawandi	Teuwas	Bhiwadi (23 km)
23	Chowki	Kutubpur	Tijara (22 km)
24	Daika	Kutubpur	Tijara (23 km)
25	Dalawas	Teuwas	Bhiwadi (20 km)
26	Daulat Nagar Majra	Bagheri Khurd	Khairthal (16 km)
27	Deengli	Ladpur	Tijara (12 km)
28	Deoseeka	Ujoli	Rewari (18 km)
29	Dheerdhoka	Tiganwa	Khairthal (22 km)
30	Doomhera	Ladpur	Tijara (14 km)
31	Gangapuri	Ladpur	Tijara (17 km)
32	Gheekaka	Gheekaka	Khairthal (31 km)
33	Girwas	Jatiyana	Alwar (32 km)
34	Gokulpur	Joriya	Tijara (15 km)
35	Goojriwas	Beelaheri	Rewari (22 km)
36	Gunsar	Gunsar	Khairthal (26 km)
37	Gurgachka	Nangal Saliya	Khairthal (18 km)
38	Hajipur	Ujoli	Rewari (16 km)
39	Hajnaka	Ujoli	Rewari (17 km)
40	Hanspur Kalan	Pataliya	Khairthal (5 km)
41	Hanspur Khurd	Pataliya	Khairthal (4 km)
42	Harsoli	Harsoli	Khairthal (10 km)
43	Ikrotiya	Ikrotiya	Khairthal (30 km)
44	Jahanpuri	Khanpur Aheeran	Khairthal (26 km)
45	Jakopur	Beelaheri	Rewari (22 km)
46	Jalaka	Gunsar	Khairthal (27 km)
47	Jamalpur	Makdawa	Tijara (27 km)
48	Jatiyana	Jatiyana	Alwar (39 km)
49	Jatoowas	Ujoli	Rewari (16 km)
50	Jharka	Pataliya	Khairthal (12 km)
51	Jhiryana	Jatiyana	Alwar (37 km)
52	Jokhawas	Ujoli	Rewari (16 km)
53	Jonal	Tiganwa	Khairthal (23 km)
54	Joriya	Joriya	Tijara (15 km)
55	Kadaiya	Patan Aheer	Khairthal (20 km)
56	Kairwa	Gunsar	Khairthal (26 km)
57	Kanharka	Kanharka	Rewari (24 km)
58	Kani	Tiganwa	Khairthal (22 km)
59	Kaririwas	Burhi Bawal	Rewari (24 km)
60	Karwar	Ikrotiya	Khairthal (54 km)
61	Kasimpur	Baghana	Rewari (22 km)
62	Kayampura Jokhawas	Kutubpur	Rewari (16 km)
63	Khairal	Khanpur Aheeran	Khairthal (25 km)
64	Khanpur Aheer	Khanpur Aheeran	Khairthal (26 km)
65	Kharola	Pataliya	Khairthal (3 km)
66	Kheri	Khanpur Aheeran	Khairthal (27 km)
67	Khohra Thakran	Tiganwa	Khairthal (25 km)
68	Kirwari	Jatiyana	Alwar (34 km)
69	Koompur	Bagheri Khurd	Khairthal (13 km)
70	Kotkasim	Kotkasim	Tijara (17 km)
71	Kutubpur	Kutubpur	Tijara (27 km)
72	Ladpur	Ladpur	Tijara (14 km)
73	Lahdod	Nangal Saliya	Khairthal (22 km)
74	Lalpur	Ujoli	Rewari (17 km)
75	Lisani	Jatiyana	Alwar (35 km)
76	Madhoopur	Bhonkar	Bhiwadi (27 km)
77	Magha Ka Majra	Tiganwa	Khairthal (25 km)
78	Majri	Burhi Bawal	Bhiwadi (25 km)
79	Makdawa	Makdawa	Rewari (22 km)
80	Maswasi Madhopuri	Beelaheri	Rewari (26 km)
81	Matalwas	Makdawa	Rewari (22 km)
82	Meerpur	Teuwas	Bhiwadi (23 km)
83	Menawas	Kutubpur	Tijara (15 km)
84	Meoli	Baghana	Rewari (23 km)
85	Mirzapur	Nangal Saliya	Khairthal (11 km)
86	Moonpur Mewan	Bagheri Khurd	Khairthal (13 km)
87	Moonpur Thakran	Khanpur Aheeran	Khairthal (26 km)
88	Nangal Saliya	Nangal Saliya	Khairthal (22 km)
89	Nangli Jatan	Pataliya	Khairthal (7 km)
90	Narooki	Kotkasim	Rewari (20 km)
91	Narwas	Kanharka	Rewari (18 km)
92	Nasopur	Bhonkar	Bhiwadi (25 km)
93	Neemlaka	Pur	Khairthal (30 km)
94	Paharwas	Ikrotiya	Khairthal (21 km)
95	Palpur	Patan Aheer	Khairthal (22 km)
96	Pataliya	Pataliya	Khairthal (8 km)
97	Patan Aheer	Patan Aheer	Khairthal (25 km)
98	Pur	Pur	Khairthal (18 km)
99	Raipur Jatan	Nangal Saliya	Khairthal (13 km)
100	Ramnagar	Jatiyana	Alwar (32 km)
101	Rampur	Beelaheri	Rewari (19 km)
102	Raniyawas	Gheekaka	Rewari (23 km)
103	Roneeja	Ladpur	Tijara (12 km)
104	Sadhooka	Jatiyana	Alwar (43 km)
105	Salkhar	Bagheri Khurd	Khairthal (13 km)
106	Sanoda	Gheekaka	Khairthal (30 km)
107	Shahjadpur	Jatiyana	Alwar (37 km)
108	Shahpur	Jatiyana	Alwar (37 km)
109	Sherpur	Kutubpur	Tijara (25 km)
110	Silpata	Makdawa	Rewari (22 km)
111	Sokha	Bagheri Khurd	Khairthal (12 km)
112	Teuwas	Teuwas	Bhiwadi (22 km)
113	Thathka	Khanpur Aheeran	Khairthal (26 km)
114	Thethar Basna	Tiganwa	Khairthal (22 km)
115	Turkwas	Joriya	Rewari (25 km)
116	Ujoli	Ujoli	Rewari (17 km)

=== Population of Kotkasim Tehsil ===
Particulars	Rural	Urban	Total
Total Population	1,37,339	N/A	1,37,339
Male Population	71,907	N/A	71,907
Female Population	65,432	N/A	65,432
Population Density	404 / km^{2}	N/A	404 / km^{2}

=== Households in Kotkasim Tehsil ===
Rural Households

Urban Households

Total Households

24,201

N/A

24,201

Sub-District Overview
Sub-District (Hindi) :	Kotkasim (कोटकासिम)
District :	Alwar
State / UT :	Rajasthan
Total Area :	340 km^{2}
Total Population :	1,37,339
Density :	404/km^{2}
Total Villages :	116

Total Population	Villages in Kotkasim Tehsil
less Than 200	2
200 - 499	22
500 - 999	41
1000 - 1999	36
2000 - 4999	13
5000 - 9999	2
10000 and above	N/A

Related Pages
List of Tehsils in Alwar
List of Districts in Rajasthan

Home | Contact Us | Terms & Conditions | Privacy Policy

©2023 VillageInfo.in
