= Siya Khoh =

- Village
- Country: India
- State: Rajasthan
- District: Alwar

Population (2011)
  - Total: 2,223

Siya Khoh is a small village in the Alwar District of Rajasthan state of India. It comes under the Mundawar tehsil, the Basmenpur gram panchayat, and the Jaipur Division. It is located 45 km towards North from District headquarters Alwar, and 160 km from State capital Jaipur. The PIN code of Siya Khoh is 301407, and the postal office is Basmenpur.

== Demographics ==
According to the 2011 census of India, the Siya Khoh village has a population of 2,223; this includes 1,176 males and 1,047 females.
