= Rajiaka =

Rajiaka is a village in Rewari tehsil of Rewari district in the Indian state of Haryana.

== Location ==
Rajiaka is situated at a distance of 12 km from Rewari in the west-south direction on State highway- 15.

== History ==
The village was founded by Rajaram Yadav of Khadulia Gotra. And after his name village named as Rajiaka. The village led Ahirwal into serving the nation with each house being proud of at least one soldier and/or officer in the Indian Armed Forces.

== Occupation ==
Main occupation of people is agriculture and government/private jobs. Some villagers are employed in government services and many people are doing private jobs in other states and countries.

== Transport ==
Rajiaka is connected to nearby villages through the road network with presence of State Transport Service and Private Bus Services which link it to Rewari and other villages.

== Geography ==
Rajiaka is located at 28.1513°N 76.5282°E.
