= Perveni =

Perveni is a village is gram panchayat in Reni Tehsil in Alwar District of Rajasthan, India. It belongs to Jaipur Division. It is located 64 km towards North from District headquarters Alwar and 149 km from State capital Jaipur.

== Transport ==
=== Road ===
There is only a single bus service from Alwar to perveni and perveni to Alwar.

== Education ==
- Govt. School
- Govt. ITI college
