= Boorhwal =

Mahu Kalan
- Census town
- Location in Rajasthan, India Mahu Kalan (India)
- Coordinates: 27.96022°N 76.28003°E
- Country: India
- State: Rajasthan
- District: Alwar

Population (2011)
  - Total: 3,548

Languages
  - Official: Hindi
- Time zone: UTC+5:30 (IST)
- Postal code: 301709

Boorhwal Ahir is a village in Teh. Behror Alwar district, Rajasthan, India. It lies near the border of Jaipur state. it's part of Ahirwal. It is 7 km from sub-district headquarters and 70 km from district headquarters. It is 140 km from state capital and 120 km from national capital.
