= Reni, Alwar =

Reni
- Tehsil
- Location in Rajasthan, India Reni (India)
- Coordinates: 27.161°N 76.713°E
- Country: India
- State: Rajasthan
- District: Alwar
- Elevation: 254 m (833 ft)

Population (2025)
  - Total: 22,500

Languages
  - Official: Hindi
- Time zone: UTC+5:30 (IST)
- Postal code: 301409
- <--Telephone code-->: 01464
- Nearest city: Rajgarh

Reni is a town (Tehsil, Municipality and Block) in Alwar district of the Indian state of Rajasthan, situated 205 km from Delhi and 122 km from Jaipur. It is situated in between Bandikui Junction and Karanpura station. Reni is Municipality area since 2024 and have population around 22500. Reni also have SDM(sub divisional magistrate) Court and Civil Court.

== Geography ==
Reni city is surrounded by mountains so it is known as Neel Nagri. There are many villages near Reni such as Cheemapura, Dera, Dagdaga, Tahtara, Parveni, Kharagpur, Nimbola etc. The town of Dausa is also not very far from Reni tehsil.

== Education ==
Reni is listed in one of the "Educationally Backward RURAL Areas " of Rajasthan 's Alwar district.

While one part of distt. (Alwar )have great educational facilities along with city itself, one the other hand this province is lacking from basic primary english medium education even in other parts like reni, some of the schools are ,"so-called Eng. Medium", having English textbooks but hindi medium teachers simultaneously (including govt. Institutions).

- Swami vivekanand Government model school, Dera :-
- Swami Vivekanand govt model school Reni
- Sant Siya Ram Public School
- Pratibha school, Reni
- Govt high school, Reni
- Adarsh govt girls sr. sec. school, Reni
- Vivekanand sr.sec. school, Reni
- Adarsh shiksha mandir, Reni
- Sant tersa sr. sec. school
- Sunrise international school
- Baba ki Coaching, Reni

=== Colleges ===
- Govt. ITI college
- Gomti devi iti college
- Sant bhagvati das college, Pinan
- shri sai ITI College, Reni
- Saraswati ITI college, Reni
- Saraswati B.ed college, Reni
- Saraswati Art's college, Reni
- Government Girl's college (since 2021 without infrastructure) currently working in two allotted rooms of government Senior Secondary School, Reni

== Villages ==
Reni include multiple villages:

- Cheemapura (6 km)
- Dagdaga (9 km)
- Rampura (8 km)
- Bhuleri(7 km)
- Danpur(5 km)
- Dera(6 km)
- Hataoj(3 km)
- itoli (3 km)
- Perveni (3 km)
- Machari (11 km)
- Pinan (12 km)
- Ghari Sawai Ram (10 km)
- Jamdoli (10 km)
- Bhajera (5 km)
- Bahadurpur (6 km)
- Hirnoti (10 km)
- Rampura (8 km)
- Tehatada (4 km)
- Bajoli (3 km)
- Thumda (4.5 km)
- Mandawar (17 km)
- Rajgarh (16 km)
- Mundiya (3.5 km)
- Peepal hera
- Nangal (2 km)
- Alwar (52 km)
- ADOOKA (15 km)
- Bairer (10km)
