= Kathumar =

Kathumar Katumbar, Kathoomar
- Town
- Location in Rajasthan, India Kathumar (India)
- Coordinates: 27.317°N 77.078°E
- Country: India
- State: Rajasthan
- District: Alwar

Population (2001)
  - Total: 10,086

Languages
  - Official: Hindi
- Time zone: UTC+5:30 (IST)
- PIN: 321605
- Census code 073732

Kathumar is a town and tehsil of Alwar district in the Indian state of Rajasthan.
