= Ramhet Singh Yadav =

Indian politician

Rao Ramhet Singh Yadav

13th & 14th Member of the Rajasthan Legislative Assembly
- Incumbent
- Assumed office 2013
- Constituency: Kishangarh Bas

Personal details
- Born: 20 November 1960 (age 65) Rajdhoki, Tijara, Alwar
- Party: Bharatiya Janata Party
- Spouse: Sharda Devi
- Education: LL.B, University of Rajasthan
- Occupation: Politician, advocate, agriculture

Ramhet Singh Yadav is an Indian politician from the Bharatiya Janata Party and a member of the Rajasthan Legislative Assembly representing the Kishangarh Bas Vidhan Sabha constituency of Rajasthan.
