= Tehla =

Tehla Töhöl
- Municipality
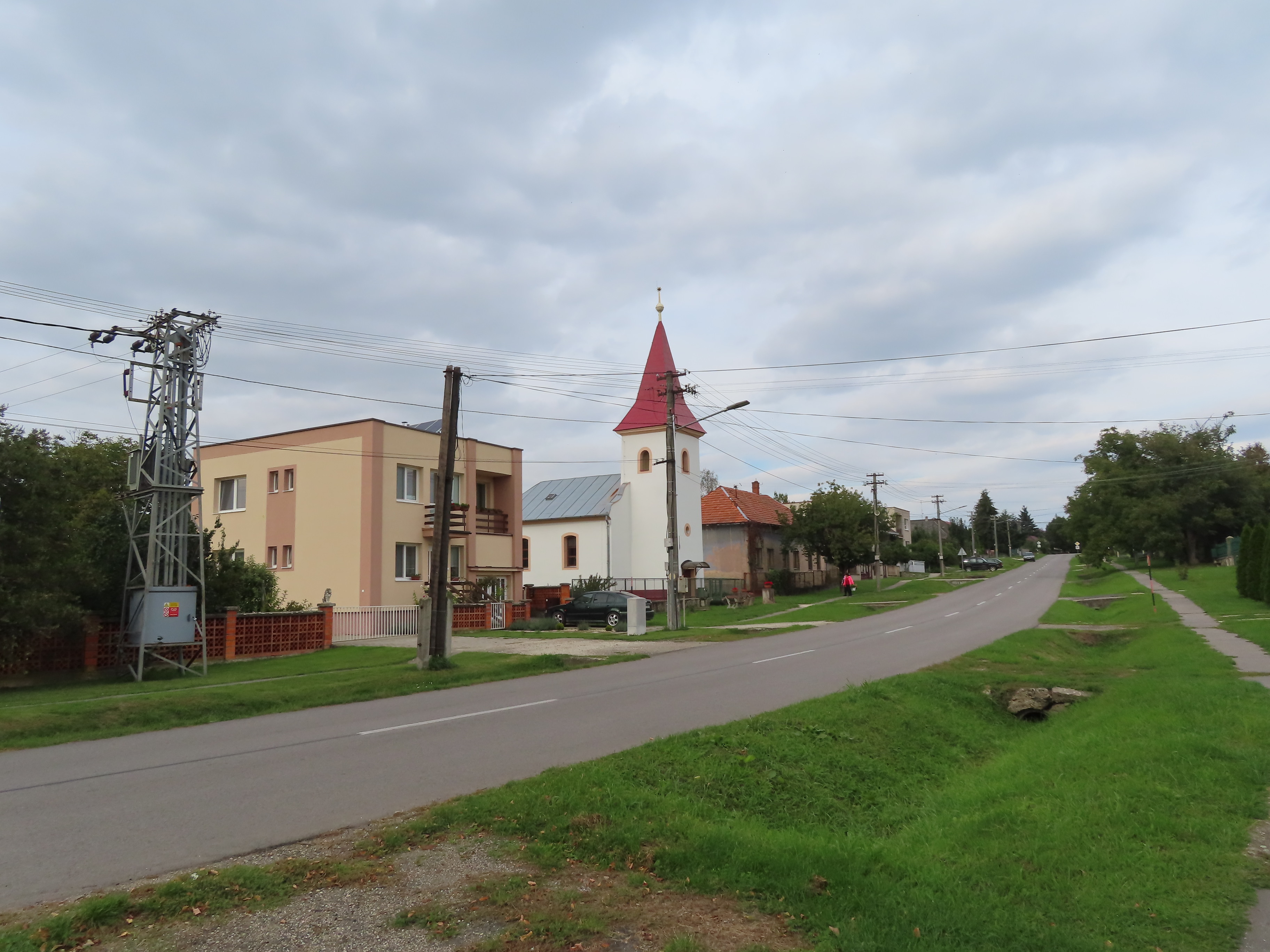
- Reformed church in Tehla

- Flag

- Location of Tehla in the Nitra Region Location of Tehla in Slovakia
- Coordinates: 48.18°N 18.38°E
- Country: Slovakia
- Region: Nitra Region
- District: Levice District
- First mentioned: 1251

Area
  - Total: 19.09 km^{2} (7.37 sq mi)
- Elevation: 173 m (568 ft)

Population (2025)
  - Total: 484
- Time zone: UTC+1 (CET)
  - Summer (DST): UTC+2 (CEST)
- Postal code: 935 35
- Area code: +421 36
- Vehicle registration plate (until 2022): LV
- Website: www.obectehla.sk

Tehla (Hungarian: Töhöl) is a village and municipality in the Levice District in the Nitra Region of Slovakia.

== History ==
In historical records the village was first mentioned in 1251.

== Geography ==
The municipality lies at an altitude of 173 metres (568 ft) and covers an area of 19.09 km^{2} (7.37 sq mi) (2025).

== Population ==
Population statistic (10 years)
Year	1995	2005	2015	2025
Count	559	551	512	484
Difference		−1.43%	−7.07%	−5.46%

Population statistic
Year	2024	2025
Count	489	484
Difference		−1.02%

It has a population of 484 people (31 December 2025).

=== Ethnicity ===
Census 2021 (1+ %)
Ethnicity	Number	Fraction
Slovak	372	80%
Hungarian	59	12.68%
Not found out	41	8.81%
Total	465	

In year 2021 was 465 people by ethnicity 372 as Slovak, 59 as Hungarian, 41 as Not found out, 2 as Russian, 1 as Czech and 1 as Romani.

Note on population: The difference values of population numbers in the table "Population statistic" and in the sections "Ethnicity" & "Religion" is caused by the use of various statistical methods.

=== Religion ===
Census 2021 (1+ %)
Religion	Number	Fraction
Roman Catholic Church	240	51.61%
None	94	20.22%
Calvinist Church	60	12.9%
Not found out	43	9.25%
Evangelical Church	17	3.66%
Total	465	

In year 2021 was 465 people by religion 240 from Roman Catholic Church, 94 from None, 60 from Calvinist Church, 43 from Not found out, 17 from Evangelical Church, 2 from Christian Congregations in Slovakia, 2 from Greek Catholic Church, 2 from Ad hoc movements, 1 from Eastern Orthodox Church, 1 from Paganism and natural spirituality, 1 from Other and not ascertained christian church, 1 from Other and 1 from Apostolic Church.

== Facilities ==
The village has a public library and football pitch.
