= Khairthal =

- Town
- Location in Rajasthan, India Khairthal (India)
- Coordinates: 27.8346°N 76.6388°E
- Country: India
- State: Rajasthan
- District: Khairthal-Tijara

Government
  - Type: Khairthal Nagar Parishad

Population (2011)
  - Total: 38,298

Languages
  - Official: Hindi
  - Spoken: Rajasthani, (Mewati)
- Time zone: UTC+5:30 (IST)
- Postal code: 301404
- ISO 3166 code: RJ-IN
- Vehicle registration: RJ-02

Khairthal is a town and a administrative headquarters of Khairthal-Tijara district of Indian state of Rajasthan. Previously it was part of the Alwar district. The town is at the northern end of the Aravalli Range. It is the part of Mewat region of Rajasthan. It has major industrial importance in Rajasthan because of its connectivity with Delhi and Jaipur. Khairthal also has one of the biggest grain markets in Rajasthan. In 2000, the APMC Mandi was opened in Khairthal. Khairthal was founded by a community of Brahmins knows as Pushkarna Bhramin, who were later joined by Sindhi and Vyasya communities. It is well known for milkcake, mustard oil and red onion.

== Demographics ==
As of 2011 India census, Khairthal had a population of 38,298, including 20,115 men and 18,183 women. Khairthal has an average literacy rate of 82.56%, higher than the state average of 66.11%: male literacy is 89.96%, and female literacy is 74.47%. 13.6% of the population is under the age of six.

== Market ==
Khairthal has the APMC Mandi, which was established in 1965, and moved to a new location in 2000. The main produce includes wheat, pulses, mustard and cotton. Khairthal also has various oil mills.

== Transport ==
Khairthal is well connected by both rail and road. It lies on the Delhi-Jaipur Railway, 130 km from Delhi. Most trains on this route stop at Khairthal, including the Ashram Express, Malani Express, Pooja Express, Kathgodam Express, Katra Express, and Yoga Express.

The town is connected by road to National Highway 8, the Jaipur Delhi Expressway. Connecting points on the NH8 from Khairthal are Kotputli (via Bansoor) on the Jaipur side, and Dharuheda via Kishangarh Bas on the Delhi side. A New expressway (highway) project under construction from Paniyala to Barodameo, which is a part of Jammu to Mumbai expressway, is under construction and its going to connect Khairthal directly with Mumbai and Jammu corridor. The nearest airports are Indira Gandhi International Airport, Delhi and Jaipur International Airport.
