= Khairthal-Tijara district =

District in Rajasthan, India

- District of Rajasthan
- Location of Khairthal-Tijara district in Rajasthan
- Coordinates: 27°56′N 76°47′E
- Country: India
- State: Rajasthan
- Division: Jaipur
- Established: August 2023
- Headquarters: Khairthal

Government
  - MP: Bhupender Yadav (BJP)
  - MLA: Baba Balaknath

Area
  - Total: 2,007 km^{2} (775 sq mi)

Population (2011)
  - Total: 966,821
  - Density: 481.7/km^{2} (1,248/sq mi)
- Time zone: UTC+05:30 (IST)
- Postal code of india/Postal code: 301404
- Vehicle registration: RJ-64

Khairthal-Tijara district is a district of the Indian state of Rajasthan. It was carved out of erstwhile Alwar district on 4 August 2023 by Chief Minister Ashok Gehlot.It is the part of Mewat region of Rajasthan.

== Demographics ==
Religions in Khairthal-Tijara district (2011)
Religion	Percent
Hinduism	72.66%
Islam	24.23%
Sikhism	2.77%
Other or not stated	0.34%

At the time of the 2011 census, the territory which would become Khairthal-Tijara district had a population of 966,821. The district had a population of 511,007 males and 455,814 females, with a sex ratio of 892 females per 1000 males. 189,866 (19.64%) lived in urban areas. Scheduled Castes and Scheduled Tribes made up 165,680 (17.14%) and 9,373 (0.97%) respectively.

At the time of the 2011 census, 76.94% of the population spoke Hindi, 12.69% Mewati (Rajasthani), 2.98% Ahirwati and 2.88% Haryanvi as their first language.

Languages in Khairthal-Tijara District (2011)
1. Hindi (76.9%)
2. Mewati (Rajasthani) (12.7%)
3. Ahirwati (2.98%)
4. Haryanvi (2.88%)
5. Others (4.51%)

== Administration ==
Khairthal-Tijara district has 7 tehsils: Tijara, Tapukra, Kotkasim, Mundawar, Kishangarh Bas, Khairthal, Harsouli.
