= Bhiwadi =

- City
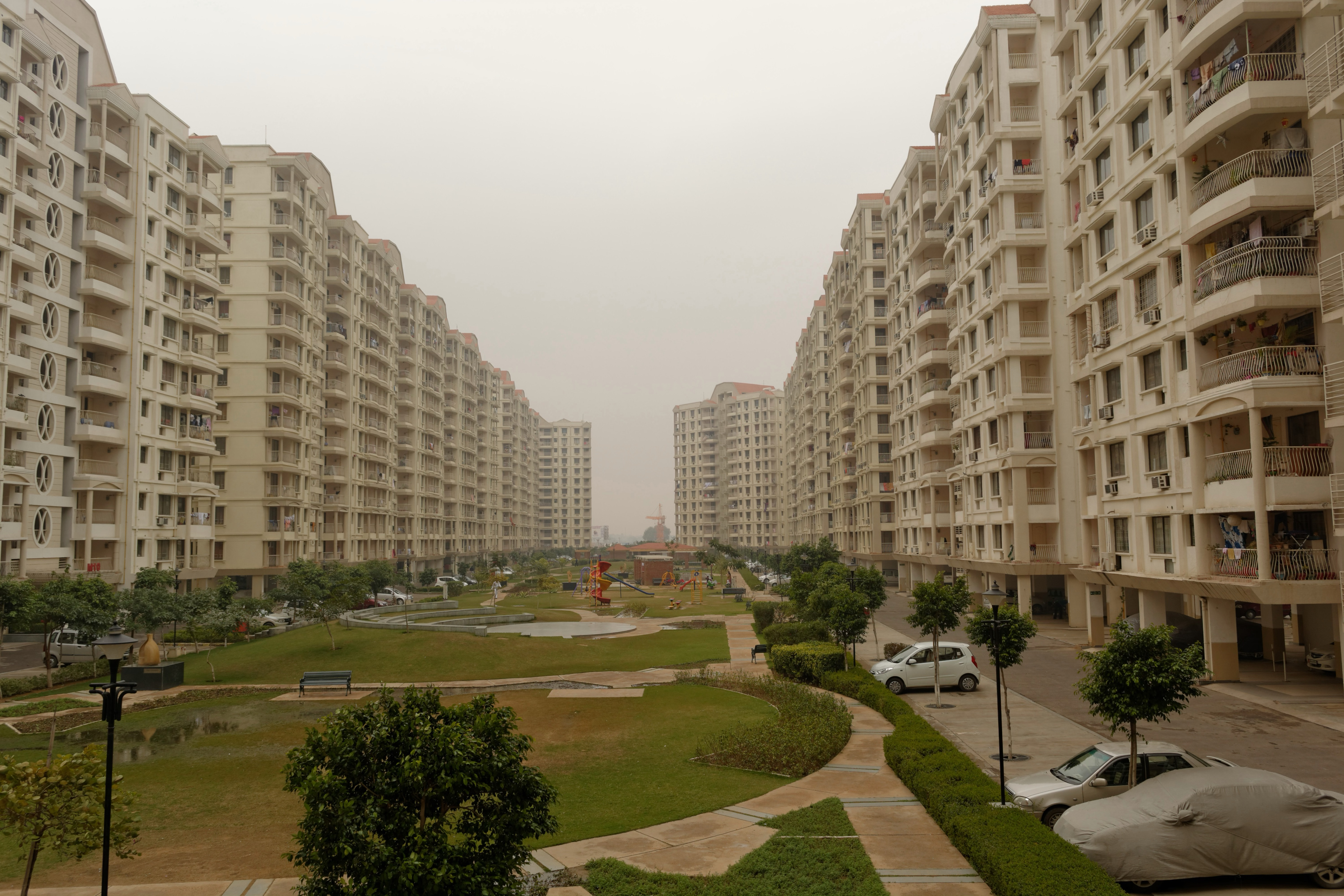
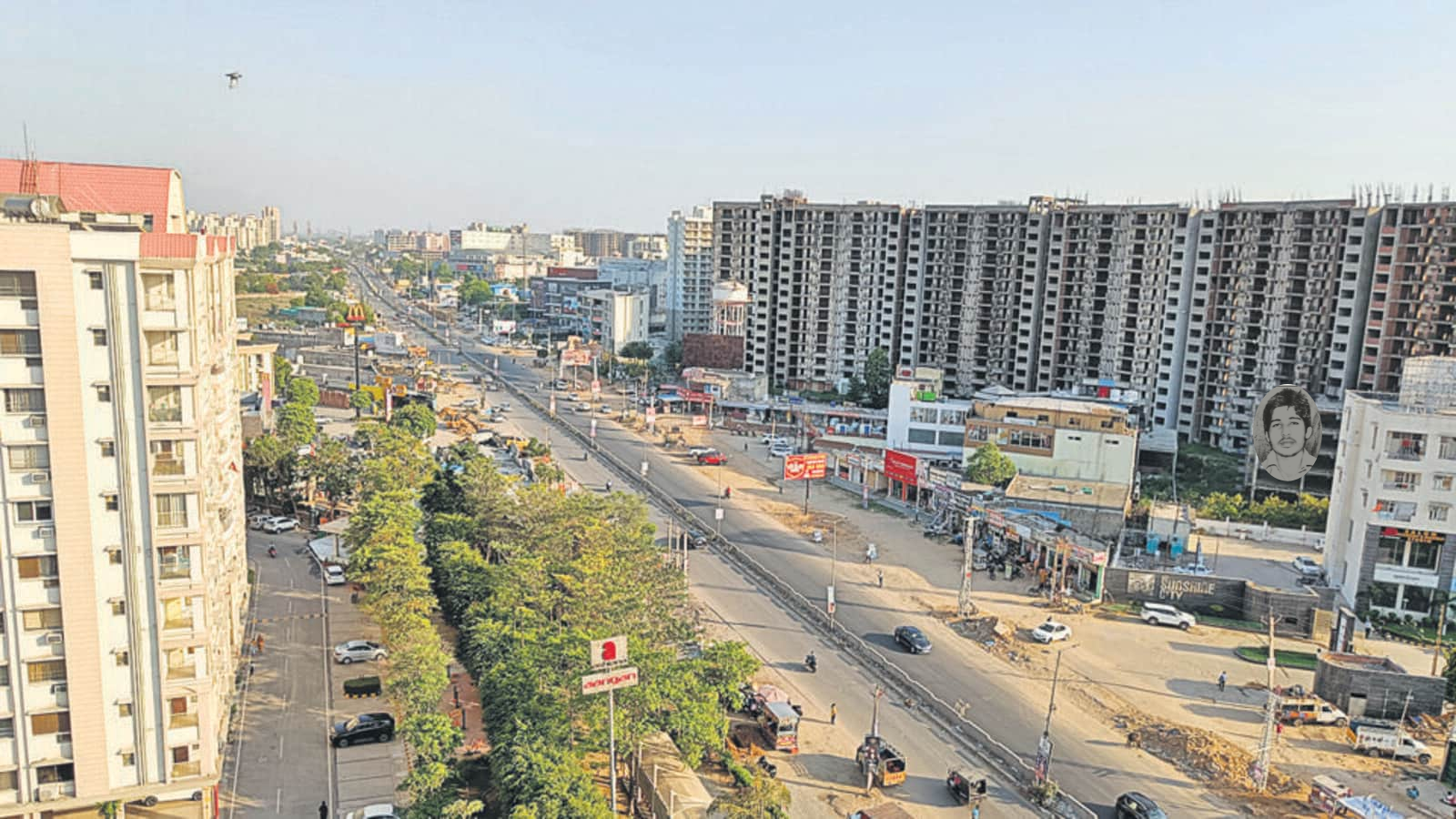
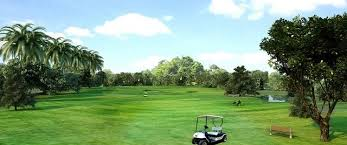
- Bhiwadi City skyline

- Location in Rajasthan, India Bhiwadi (India)
- Coordinates: 28.21°N 76.87°E
- Country: India
- State: Rajasthan
- District: Khairthal-Tijara

Government
  - Body: BIDA
- Elevation: 270 m (890 ft)

Population (2021)
  - Total: 632,629

Languages
  - Official: Hindi
  - Regional: Rajasthani, Ahirwati
- Time zone: UTC+5:30 (IST)
- PIN: 301019
- ISO 3166 code: RJ-IN
- Vehicle registration: RJ 40
- Website: bida.rajasthan.gov.in

Bhiwadi is a planned city in Khairthal-Tijara district in the Indian state of Rajasthan and a Part of National Capital Region of Delhi. It is located 32 from Khairthal-Tijara city, the district headquarters, 85 km away from the city of Alwar and situated on the Rajasthan-Haryana border. Bhiwadi is considered to be a hub for Taiwanese and Japanese companies. The city is divided into three separate zones, which are the residential, industrial and commercial zones. In recent years, it also became one of the most polluted cities in the world in terms of air pollution.

== Location and Infrastructure ==
Bhiwadi is situated at 28.21°N, 76.87°E. It is 60 km away from New Delhi, 200 km from Jaipur, 90 km from Alwar, 40 km from Gurgaon and 50 km from Faridabad (PROP Touch India Sec-49). It can be reached through the National Highway NH48 (Delhi-Jaipur highway) via Dharuhera, in 50 min from Hero Honda Chowk (Gurgaon) and in 70-90 min from IGI Airport, New Delhi. It can also be reached by the Gurgaon-Sohna-Tauru-Dharuhera road.

The nearest railway station is Rewari Junction, 26 km south of city.

The nearest Airport is Indira Gandhi International Airport, 55 km north of the city.

== Demographics and population ==
As of the 2021 census of India, Bhiwadi had a population of 6,04,883. However, it is estimated that the Bhiwadi Municipality's population is approximately 6,44,000 people, and will grow in the following years - by 2030, it is expected that more than 10,73,000 people will live in the city. Males and females constitute 57% and 43% of the population respectively, with 59,712 males and 45,209 females. That means that there are 800 females per 1000 males. According to the 2011 census of India, children under 6 make 16.29% of the city's total population. 79.84% of Bhiwadi's population is literate, which is almost 15% higher than the average literacy in Rajasthan, the state where the city is located. Male literacy is almost 20% higher than female literacy, with 87.2% of men having the ability to read and write compared to women's 69.87%.

According to the census, 87.94% of the population follows the religion of Hinduism, 10% recognise themselves as Muslim, 1.34% are Sikh. 0.68% follow other religions, and 0.03% do not believe in any.

== Economy ==
The town is spread over nearly 5,300 acres with houses covering around 2,700. The town contains a range of large, medium and small scale industries, from steel mills and furnaces to automobile and electronics manufacturing.

== Climate and geography ==
During the summer, the weather in the city gets hot, while temperatures in winter are fairly cool. The maximum and minimum temperatures ever recorded are ~51 °C and ~3 °C, respectively. The average wind velocity is 5 km/h, while the humidity is around 70%. Bhiwadi is located 270 m above sea level. The Aravali mountain (Aravalli Range) is located 95 km South-East of the city. The Sariska Tiger Reserve, which is also a popular tourist destination, is located 120 km south of the city.

In 2021 and 2022 Bhiwadi was deemed one of the most polluted cities in the world by IQAir, a Swiss air quality technology company. In 2022, Bhiwadi ranked 3rd in the worst air quality list by IQAir in the world after Lahore and Hotan, with an annual average PM2.5 concentration of 92.7 μg/m^{3}. In some months, such as April, the monthly average PM2.5 concentration becomes as high as 150 μg/m^{3}, which exceeds the WHO guideline by 30 times. Despite being India's most polluted city in 2021 and 2022, Bhiwadi has not been included in the World Quality Air Report 2023.

According to the World Air Quality Report 2024, Bhiwadi is one of the world's 20 most polluted city in India.

== See also ==
- Kundli-Manesar-Palwal Expressway
- National Highway 8 (India)
- Dharuhera
- Nikhri
- Industrial Area Khushkhera
