= Kishangarh Bas =

- Census town
- Location in Rajasthan, India Kishangarh Bas (India)
- Coordinates: 27.82°N 76.72°E
- Country: India
- State: Rajasthan
- District: Alwar
- Tehsil: Kishangarh Bas
- Elevation: 433 m (1,421 ft)

Languages
  - Official: Hindi
  - Spoken: Rajasthani(Ahirwati)
- Telephone code: 01460
- Lok Sabha constituency: Alwar
- Vidhan Sabha constituency: Kishangarh Bas
- Assembly MLA: Deepchand

Kishangarh Bas is a census town in Alwar district in the Indian state of Rajasthan. The Fort was built by Maharaja Surajmal. Kishan Singh who was an officer of Maharaja Surajmal of Bharatpur built the Kisheneshwar Temple inside the Fort.

== Geography ==
Kishangarh Bas is located at 27.82°N 76.72°E. It has an average elevation of 433 metres (1420 feet).

== Demographics ==
As of 2001 India census, Kishangarh Bas had a population of 9472. Males constitute 53% of the population and females 47%. Kishangarh Bas has an average literacy rate of 71%, higher than the national average of 59.5%: male literacy is 79%, and female literacy is 62%. In Kishangarh Bas, 15% of the population is under 6 years of age.
