= Dharuhera =

- Census town
- Location in Haryana, India Dharuhera (India)
- Coordinates: 28.22°N 76.78°E
- Country: India
- State: Haryana
- District: Rewari

Government
  - Type: Mayor-council government
  - Body: Dharuhera Municipal Committee
  - Chairman: Ajay Jangda (BJP)
- Elevation: 244 m (801 ft)

Population (2013)
  - Total: about 23,000

Languages
  - Official: Hindi हिंदी, Haryanvi हरियाणवी
  - Spoken: Ahirwati अहीरवाटी
- Time zone: UTC+5:30 (IST)
- Postal code: 123106
- Vehicle registration: HR 36
- Website: haryana.gov.in

Dharuhera is a census town located, just 19 km from Rewari city in Rewari district of the state of Haryana, India. Dharuhera comes under Delhi NCR region and it is a big Industrial hub in Rewari District. Dharuhera is the new growth corridor of Gurugram and New Delhi. It is only an hour drive from the Indira Gandhi International Airport and 19 km from Rewari city, the district headquarter, 40 km from Gurugram. It connects Rajasthan to the capital, New Delhi, through the National Highway 48 (formerly NH8). It is a prime choice for industrialists, investors, and real estate developers due to its location. Dharuhera is located in what is colloquially referred as most prosperous region of Haryana.

== Demographics ==
As of 2011 India census, Dharuhera had a population of 30,344. As of 2011 males constituted 54.09% of the population and females 45.91%. Dharuhera had an average literacy rate of 83.18%, higher than the state average of 75.55% and national average of 74.04%: male literacy was 90.21% and, female literacy was 74.92%. 14.60% of the population was under 6 years of age. As of 2013, after rapid growth, the population is estimated to be 45,000. The Scheduled Castes consists of 16.10% of total population of Dharuhera

Religion in Dharuhera (2011)
1. Hinduism (97.3%)
2. Islam (1.48%)
3. Jainism (0.43%)
4. Sikhism (0.47%)
5. Christianity (0.17%)
6. Buddhism (0.08%)
7. Others (0.07%)

== Villages and Sectors ==
Villages

- Aakera
- Alwalpur
- Asadpur
- Asiyaki
- Bagthala
- Bakhapur
- Baliar Kalan
- Baliar Khurd
- Basai Mukandpur
- Bhatsana
- Bhudla
- Bolni
- Dhakia
- Dhwana
- Dohana
- Dungarwas
- Fadni
- Garhi
- Garhi Alwalpur
- Ghatal Maheniyawas
- Jarthal
- Jaunawas
- Jeetpura
- Joniyawas
- Kapriwas
- Kasola
- Kasoli
- Kathuwas
- Khaliawas
- Kharkhara
- Khatwali
- Kheri Motla
- Khijuri
- Ladhuwas
- Maheshwari
- Majri
- Malahera
- Malpura
- Masani
- Nandrampur Bas
- Nikhri NH 8 Residential Zone Sector 1&2 MBIR
- Ninganiyawas
- Pachgaon
- Panchor
- Rajpura Alamgirpur
- Rasgan
- Sanpli
- Tatarpur Istmurar
- Tatarpur Khalsa
- Titarpur

Sectors

- Sector 1
- Sector 1A
- Sector 1B
- Sector 2
- Sector 2A
- Sector 2B
- Sector 3
- Sector 3A
- Sector 4
- Sector 4A
- Sector 5
- Sector 5A
- Sector 5B
- Sector 6
- Sector 7
- Sector 7A
- Sector 8
- Sector 9
- Sector 10
- Sector 11
- Sector 12
- Sector 13
- Sector 14
- Sector 15
- Sector 16
- Sector 17
- Sector 18
- Sector 19
- Sector 20
- Sector 21
- Sector 22
- Sector 23
- Sector 24

== Economy ==
The economy of Dharuhera was mainly agrarian dominated until recently. Dharuhera industrial estate has provided some employment to the local people. Of late, initiated by an industrial estate developed by the state of Haryana, much of the agricultural land has been developed by real estate developers. As the urbanisation and construction activity extends from Delhi, Dharuhera is now a preferred location for investors in real estate and built properties.

=== Industries ===
Dharuhera industrial estate is located on both sides of NH48 and has many large manufacturing plants such as Hero MotoCorp Ltd. (formerly Hero Honda Motors Ltd.), Jtekt India Ltd. (formerly known as Sona Koyo Steering Systems Ltd.).

Venus Engineers (Opp. Power House) and DELPHI Automotive Systems Pvt. Ltd (a global MNC). Dharuhera also has India’s biggest dairy plant Amul, Carlsberg beer factory, Lumax Industries Ltd., Dharuhera Pharmaceutical Pvt. Ltd., Rico Auto Industries, Sehgal Paper Mills, East India Synthetics, and Indian Oil Corporation.

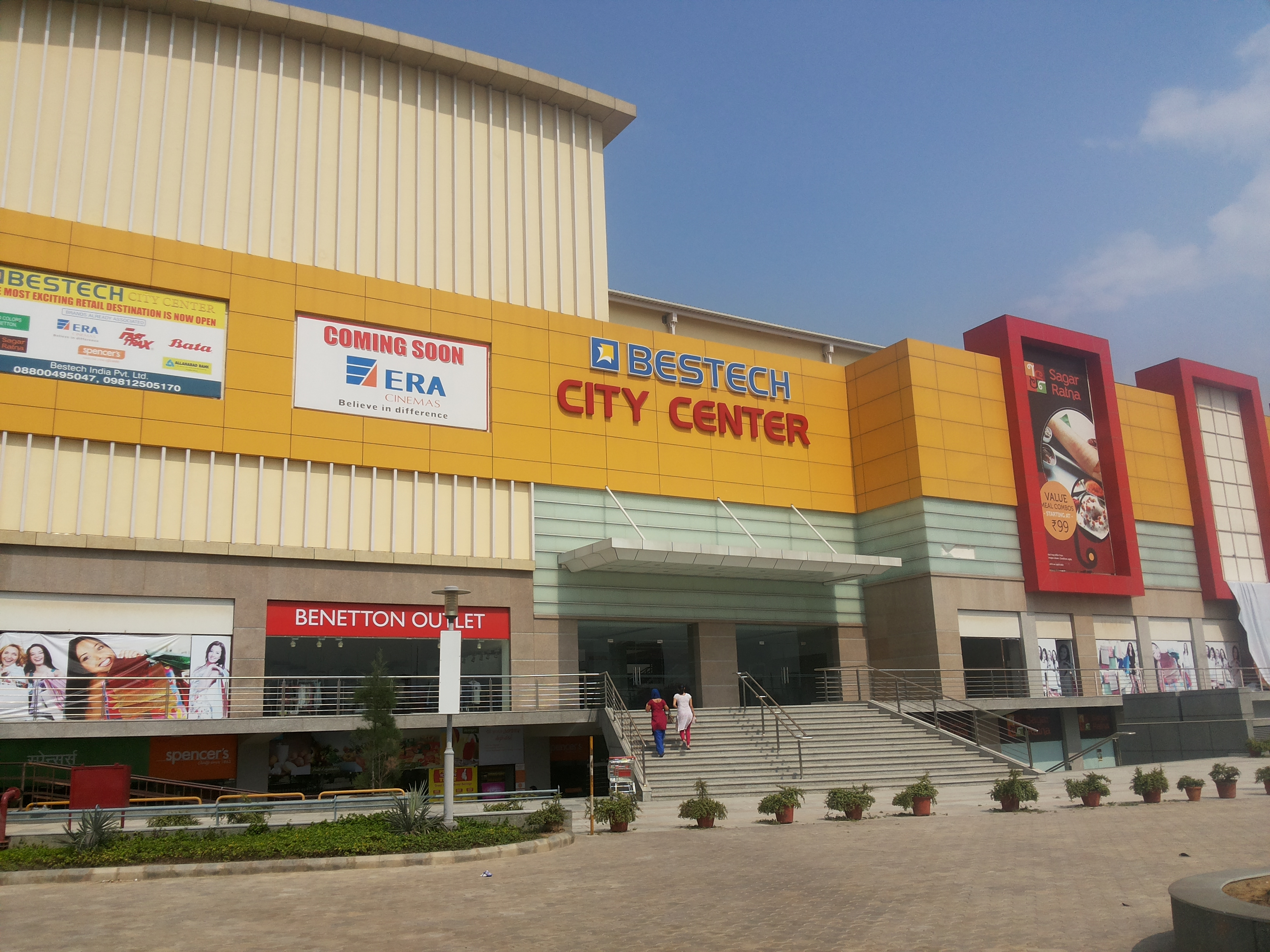
First mall in Dharuhera

=== Urban development ===
Dharuhera is about a 40-minute drive from Gurgaon and 60 minutes from Indira Gandhi International Airport. Due to its proximity to Gurgaon and New Delhi, Dharuhera had all the makings of the next big satellite city in the region, with a number of developers running projects here, but it has been deprived by the short sightedness of the Haryana Urban Development Authority (HUDA). The town lacks good public sector healthcare, educational institutes, recreational centres, public spaces, leisure parks, libraries, art galleries, places for performing arts, stadiums, swimming pools, theatres, multiplex (one is coming up at Bestech city), and parking spaces in markets. It even lacks a proper crematorium or burial ground. To be fair to Dharuhera, the town planners in Haryana are generally regarded as incompetent and have done no damage to their reputation as probably the worst town planners in the country. The town lacks adequate drainage facilities and usually the parts near the NH-48 and Bhiwadi are submerged even after the slightest rain, due to planning mistakes. But lack of affordable real estate in National Capital Region has made people overlook these problems.

== See also places ==
- Nikhri Village NH-48
- Gurgaon
- Sohna
- Bhiwadi
- Tapukara
- Manesar
- Bawal
- Kundli-Manesar-Palwal Expressway
- Pataudi
- Khuskhera
- Haryana
