= Ahirwal =

- Interactive map of Ahirwal
- Coordinates: 28.2°N 76.6°E
- Country: India
- States: Haryana, Rajasthan

Languages
  - Official: Hindi
  - Spoken: Ahirwati

Ahirwal is a region of southern Haryana, north-eastern Rajasthan, and South-Western Delhi The region was once a small principality based from the town of Rewari and controlled by members of the Ahir community from around the time when the Mughal Empire was in decline.

== Overview ==
The name translates as "Land of the Ahirs". J. E. Schwartzberg has described it as a "folk region" and Lucia Michelutti as a "cultural-geographic region ... which includes parts of the districts of Alwar, Bharatpur in Rajasthan and Mahendragarh, Rewari, Gurgaon in the state of Haryana." The Ahirwal region in southern Haryana has 11 assembly segments spread over three Lok Sabha seats – Bhiwani-Mahendergarh, Gurgaon and Rohtak (one segment only) – having a sizeable presence of Ahir voters.

The main language of the area is Ahirwati. It is commonly taken to be a dialect of Mewati and classified within the Rajasthani group of languages, but it also has characteristics in common with the neighbouring Western Hindi varieties. The closely related Bangru (also known as Haryanvi) and Hindi are also spoken in the region.

The events at the battle of Rezang La on 18 November 1962 involved many soldiers from the Ahirwal region, who were greatly outnumbered by their Chinese opponents.

== See also ==
- Administrative divisions of Haryana
- Ahirwati
- Bagar tract
- Grand Trunk Road
- Mewat
