= Ahirwati =

Indo-Aryan dialect of India

- Native to: India
- Region: Ahirwal
- Language family: Indo-European: Indo-Iranian; Indo-Aryan; Rajasthani; Mewati; Ahirwati

Language codes
- ISO 639-3: –
- Location within India
- Coordinates: 28.3°N 76.5°E

Ahirwati (Ahīrvāṭī, sometimes also known as Hīrwāṭī) is an Indo-Aryan dialect of India. It is spoken within the Ahirwal region located to the south-west of the capital Delhi. It belongs to the Rajasthani language group and is commonly taken to be a dialect of Mewati, but in many respects it is intermediate with the neighbouring varieties of Haryanvi and Bagri, and is especially close to Shekhawati.

There are no reliable census figures for the number of speakers. In the past it was variously written in either Devanagari, Gurmukhi, or the Perso-Arabic script.

A peculiar feature of the grammar of Ahirwati is the use of the same postposition to mark both the agent (in certain tenses) and the object.

== Geographic distribution ==
Haryana and surrounding areas with some of the locations mentioned in this section. Places where Ahirwati is spoken are in dark red.

Ahirwati is spoken mostly in the south of Haryana. At its maximal extent, its territory extends from Loharu in the west to Sohna in the east, and from Jhajjar and Najafgarh in the north to Bawal and Narnaul to Behror in the south. It encompasses partially or fully the districts of Mahendragarh, Jhajjar, Rewari, Charkhi Dadri and Gurgaon, as well as the areas of Taoru in Nuh district and Loharu in Bhiwani district (all in Haryana); Kotputli-Behror, Khairthal-Tijara( in Rajasthan), Najafgarh (in Delhi), and additionally an enclave further to the north in the region of Hansi, in Hisar district.

Ahirwati folk song sung by elderly women

Ahirwati's neighbouring dialects are Bangru and Bagri to the north, Shekhawati and Torawati to the west, and Mewati to the south.

== Bibliography ==
- Grierson, George A. (1908). Linguistic Survey of India. Vol. IX Indo-Aryan family. Central group, Part 2, Specimens of the Rājasthāni and Gujarāti. Calcutta: Office of the Superintendent of Government Printing, India. pp. 49–51.
- Masica, Colin P. (1991). The Indo-Aryan languages. Cambridge language surveys. Cambridge University Press. ISBN 978-0-521-23420-7.
- Sharma, Ishwari Prasad (c. 1979). "Mevātī". In Sharada, Sadhu Ram (ed.). Hariyāṇā kī upabhāṣāeṃ (in Hindi). Chandigarh: Bhasha Vibhag. pp. 271–336.
- Yadav, Shankar Lal (c. 1979). "Ahīrvāṭī". In Sharada, Sadhu Ram (ed.). Hariyāṇā kī upabhāṣāeṃ (in Hindi). Chandigarh: Bhasha Vibhag. pp. 193–269.
