= Alwar district =

- District
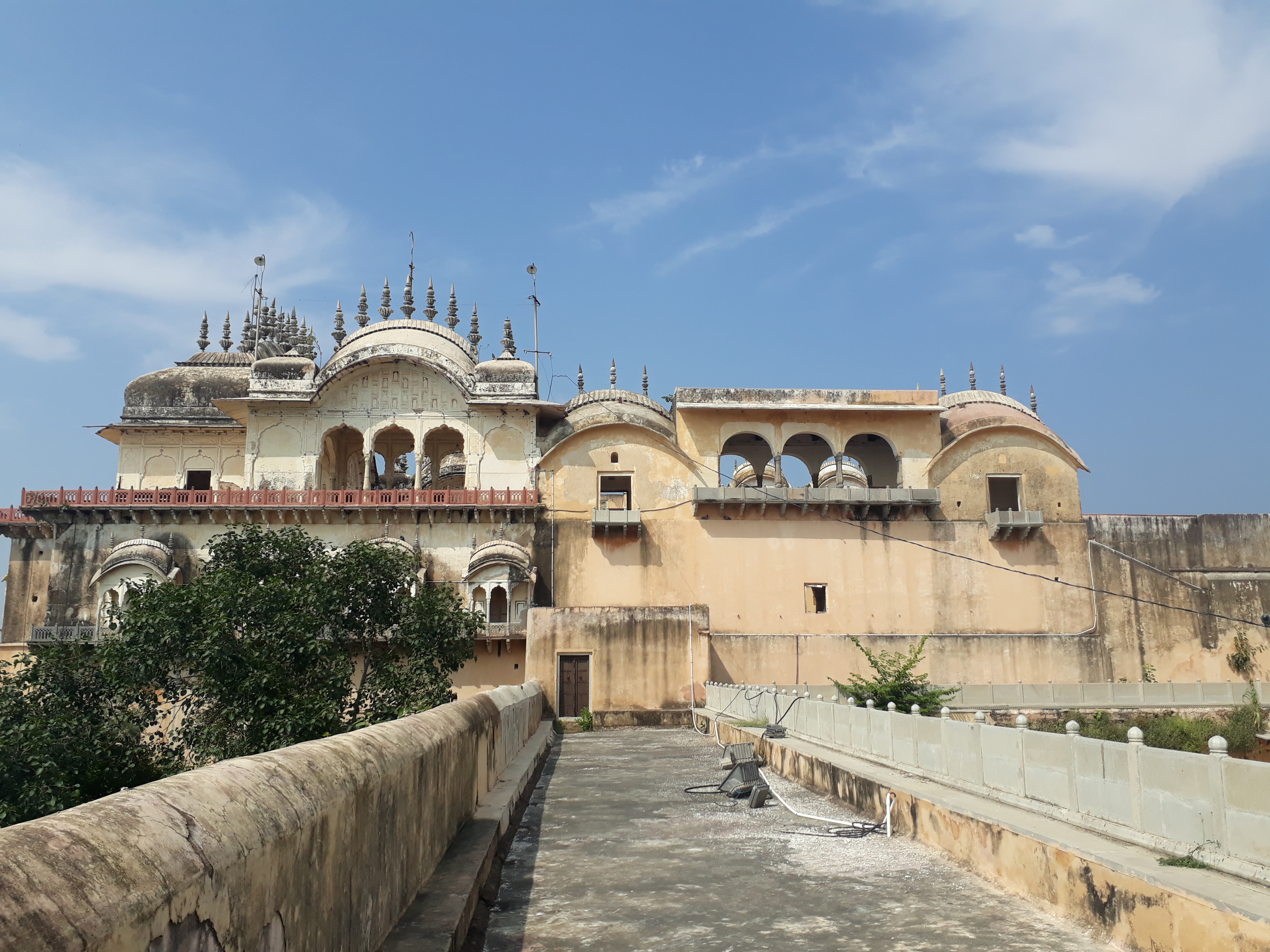
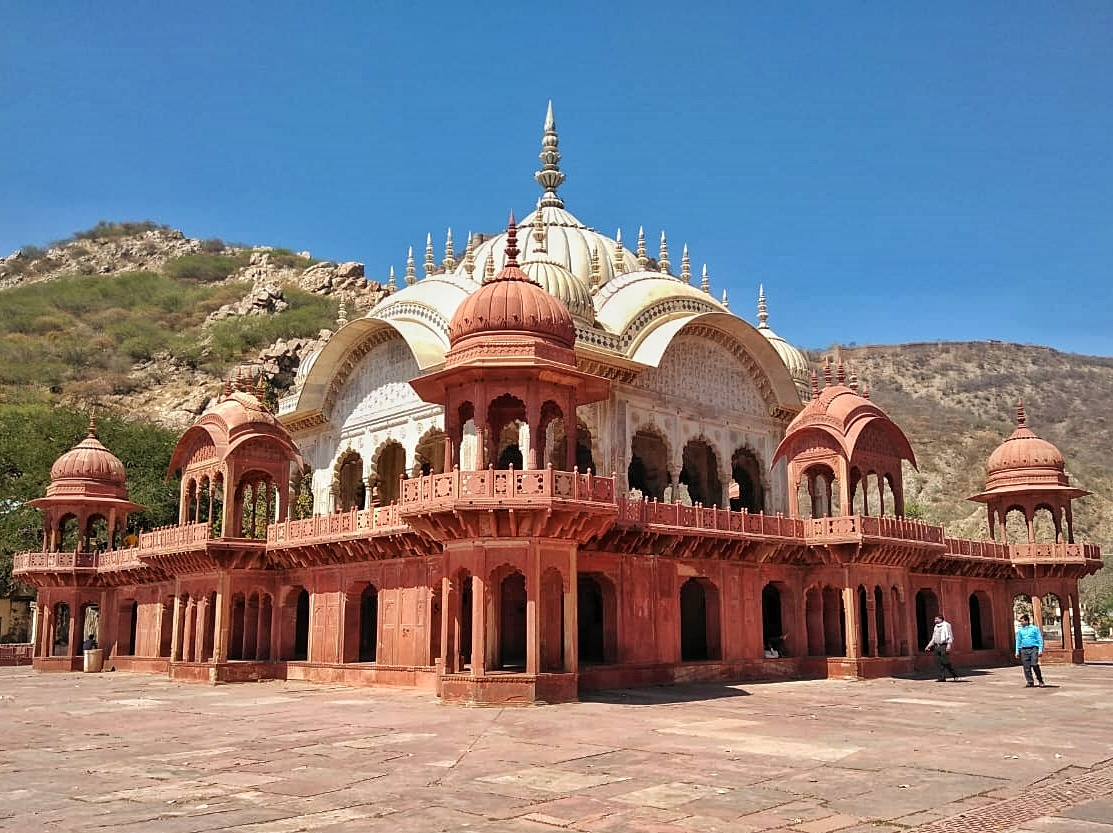
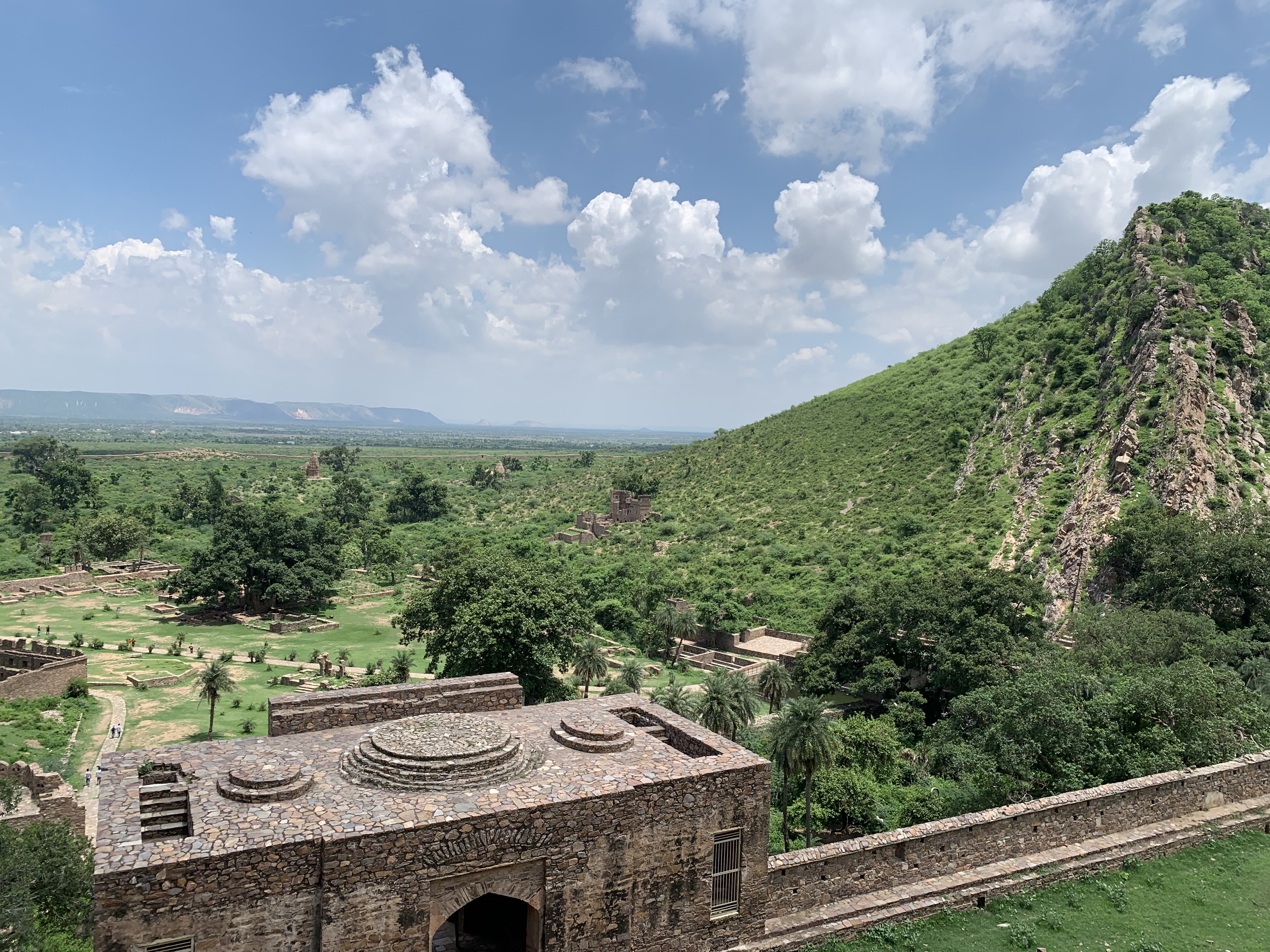
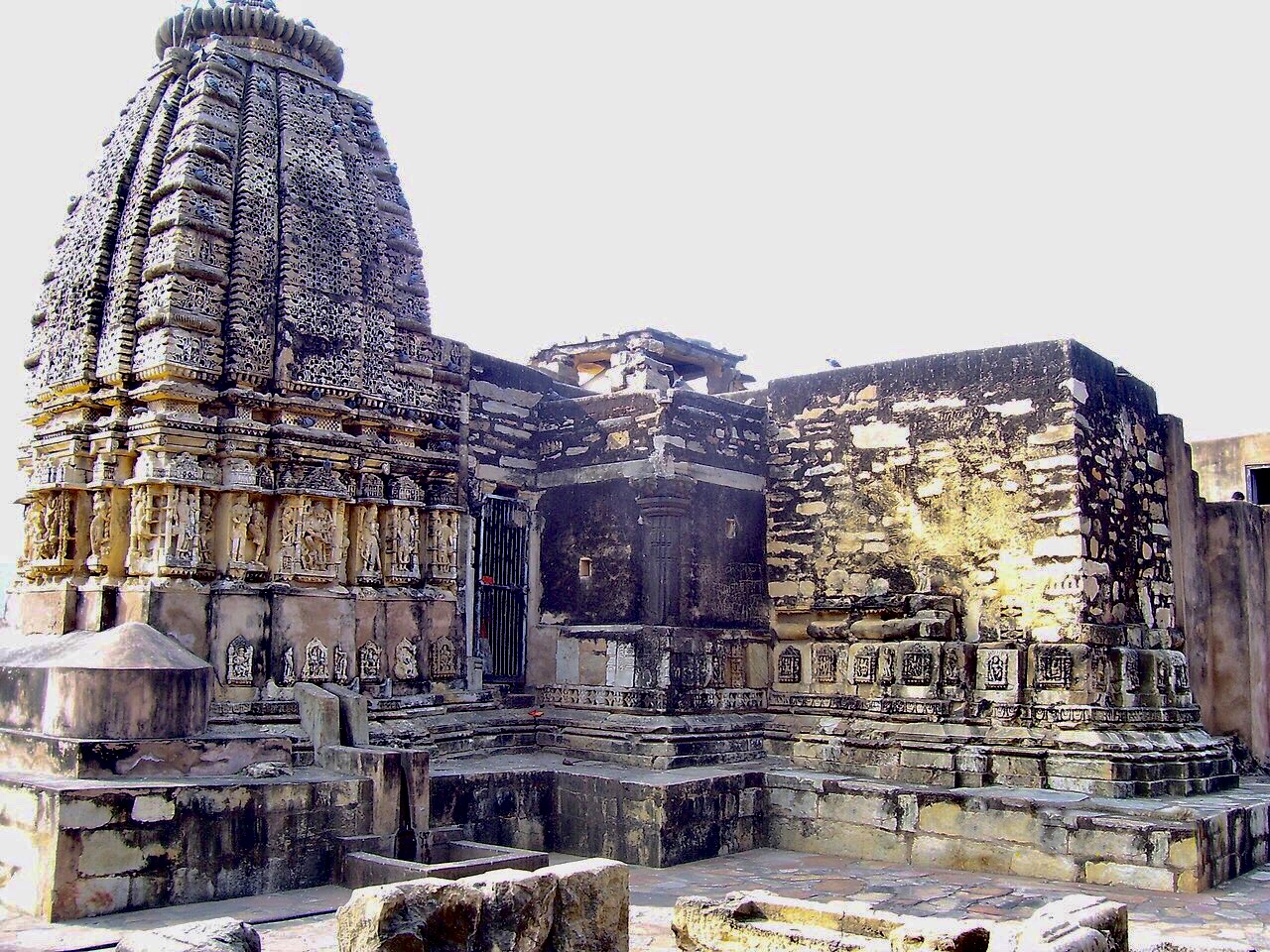
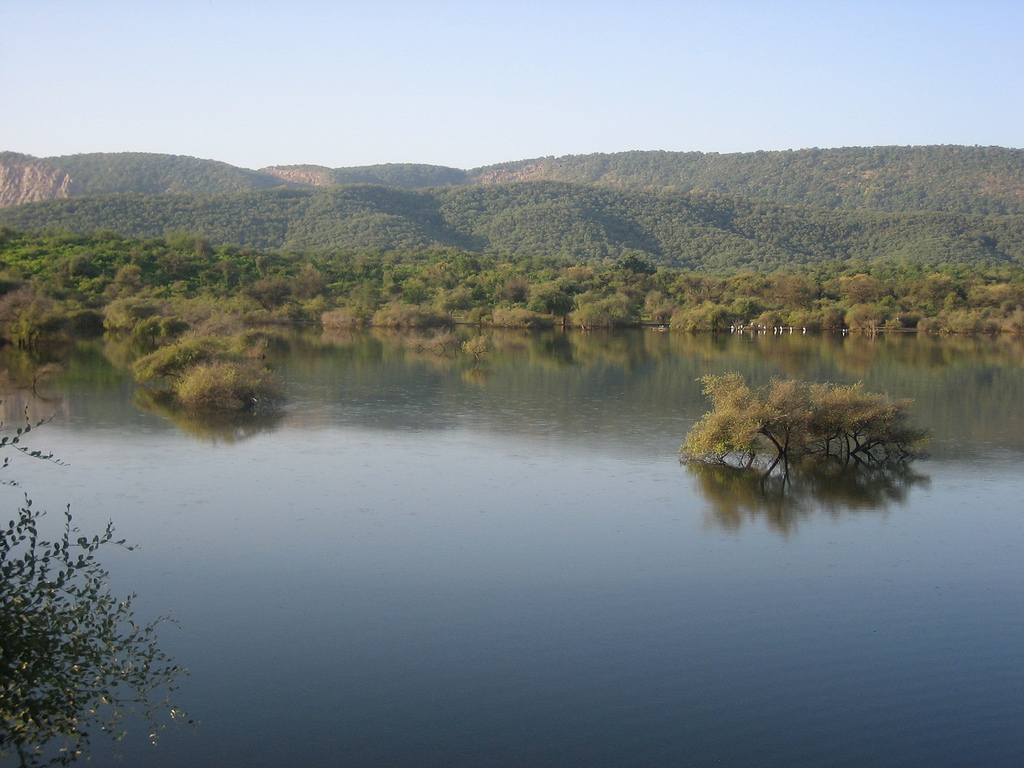
- Clockwise from top-left: Alwar fort, Musi Maharani ki Chhatri, Neelkanth Shiv Mandir, Sariska Tiger Reserve, Bhangarh Fort

- Location of Alwar district in Rajasthan
- Coordinates (Alwar): 27°34′12″N 76°36′00″E
- Country: India
- State: Rajasthan
- Division: Jaipur
- Headquarters: Alwar
- Tehsils (12): Alwar, Govindgarh, Tehla, Kathumar, Laxmangarh, Rajgarh, Ramgarh, Thanagazi, Pratapgarh, Reni, Malakhera, Naugaon

Government
  - District Collector & Magistrate: Ashish Gupta, IAS
  - Superintendent of Police: Anand Sharma, IPS

Area
  - Total: 4,931.45 km^{2} (1,904.04 sq mi)

Population (2011)
  - Total: 2,014,779
  - Density: 408.557/km^{2} (1,058.16/sq mi)

Demographics
  - Literacy: 71.68%
  - Sex ratio: 894
- Time zone: UTC+05:30 (IST)
- Vehicle registration: RJ-02
- Website: alwar.rajasthan.gov.in

Alwar district is a district in the state of Rajasthan in northern India, whose district headquarters is Alwar city. The district covers 8,337 km^{2}. It is bound on the north by Khairthal Tijara and Kot Behror district of Rajasthan, on the east by Bharatpur district of Rajasthan and Nuh district of Haryana, on the south by Dausa district, and on the west by Jaipur district.

As of 2011, it is the third most populous district of Rajasthan (out of 33), after Jaipur and Jodhpur.

== Administration ==
Alwar district has 12 tehsils:

- Alwar
- Govindgarh
- Kathumar
- Lachhmangarh
- Rajgarh
- Pratapgarh
- Tehla
- Ramgarh
- Thanagazi
- Reni
- Malakhera
- Naugawan

It has only one Lok Sabha constituency, Alwar.

== Industry ==
The district has industrial estates, such as Alwar MIA (Matasya Industrial Area), where companies such as Ashok Leyland, Pepsi, Havells, Diageo, Adani Wilmar and Kajaria Ceramics have manufacturing plants.

== Agriculture ==
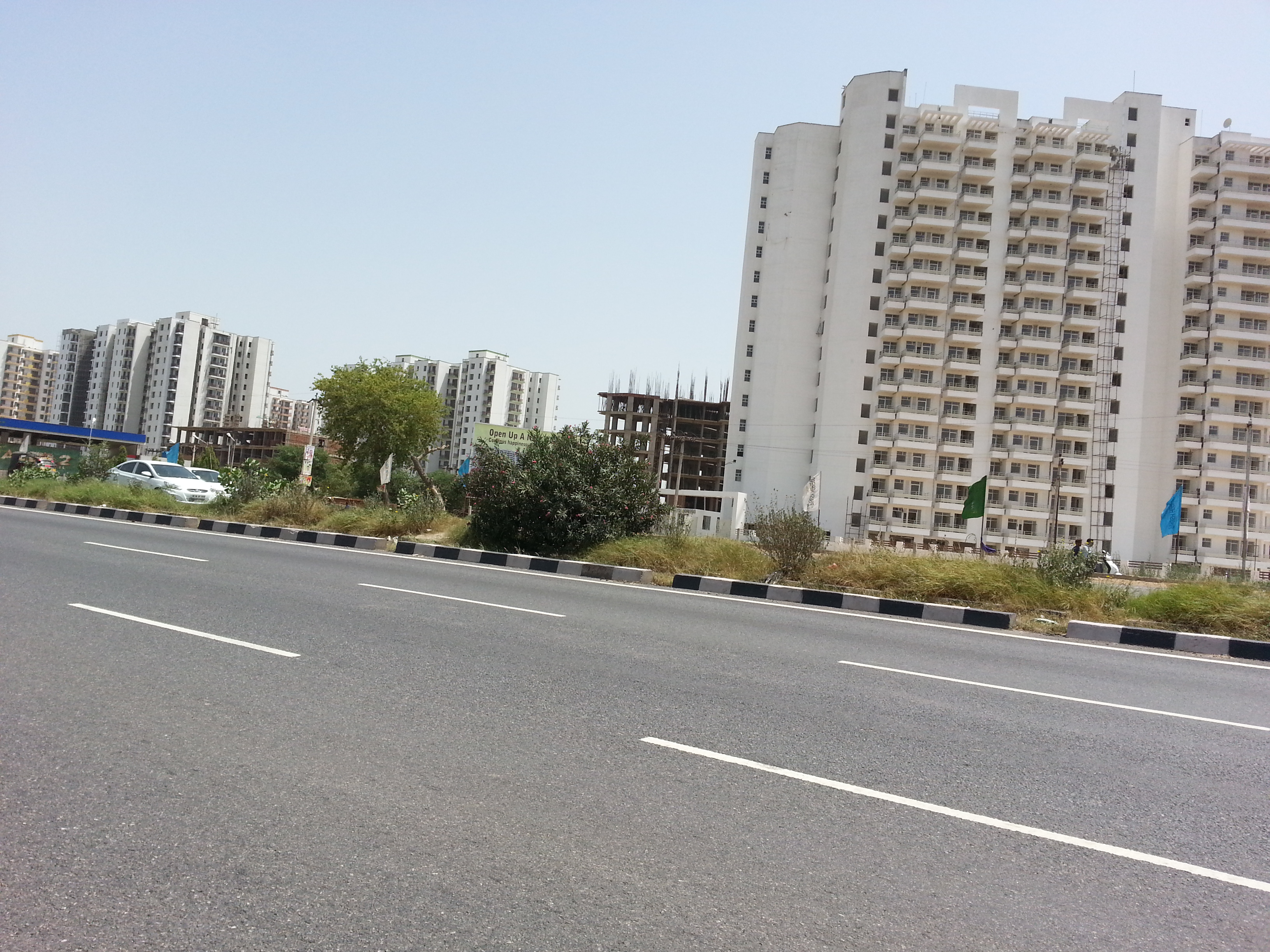
New residential buildings in Neemrana Alwar

Alwar has an important place in agriculture production in Rajasthan. The total geographical area of the district is 838,000 hectares, which is about 2.5% of the state. In 2010–2011, the net cultivated area was 507,171 hectares, from which about 83 percent of area (451,546 hectares) is irrigated and the remaining 17 percent (82,903 hectares) is unirrigated. The double cropped area is nearly 252,000 hectares, of which 32,230 (12%) is irrigated and the remaining 219,819 (88%) is unirrigated. Thus, the total cropped area of the district is 812,873 hectares.

In Kharif season, bajra, maize, Jowar, kharif pulses, arhar, sesamum, cotton, guar, and more are sown in about 329,088 hectares (42%), and in Rabi season, wheat, barley, gram, mustard, taramira, and rabi pulses are sown in about 452,527 hectares (58%). The main source of irrigation are wells and tube wells. By 26,064 tube wells, about a 192,861-hectare area is being irrigated and by 57,196 wells about 265,169 hectares area is irrigated. By other sources like canals, tanks about a 404 hectare area is irrigated. About 35,470 electric motors and 66,502 diesel pump sets are being used for irrigation purposes.

The normal rainfall for the district is 657.3 mm. The average rainfall in the last ten years in the district is 724 mm. The rainfall distribution in the district is uneven and scattered, which resulted in occasional floods and droughts, which affect the agriculture production, as well as the cropping pattern in Kharif and Rabi season. Thus, the agriculture in the district by and large depends on rainfall distribution. The average rainfall in 2016, up to September, is 217 mm.

== Places of interest ==
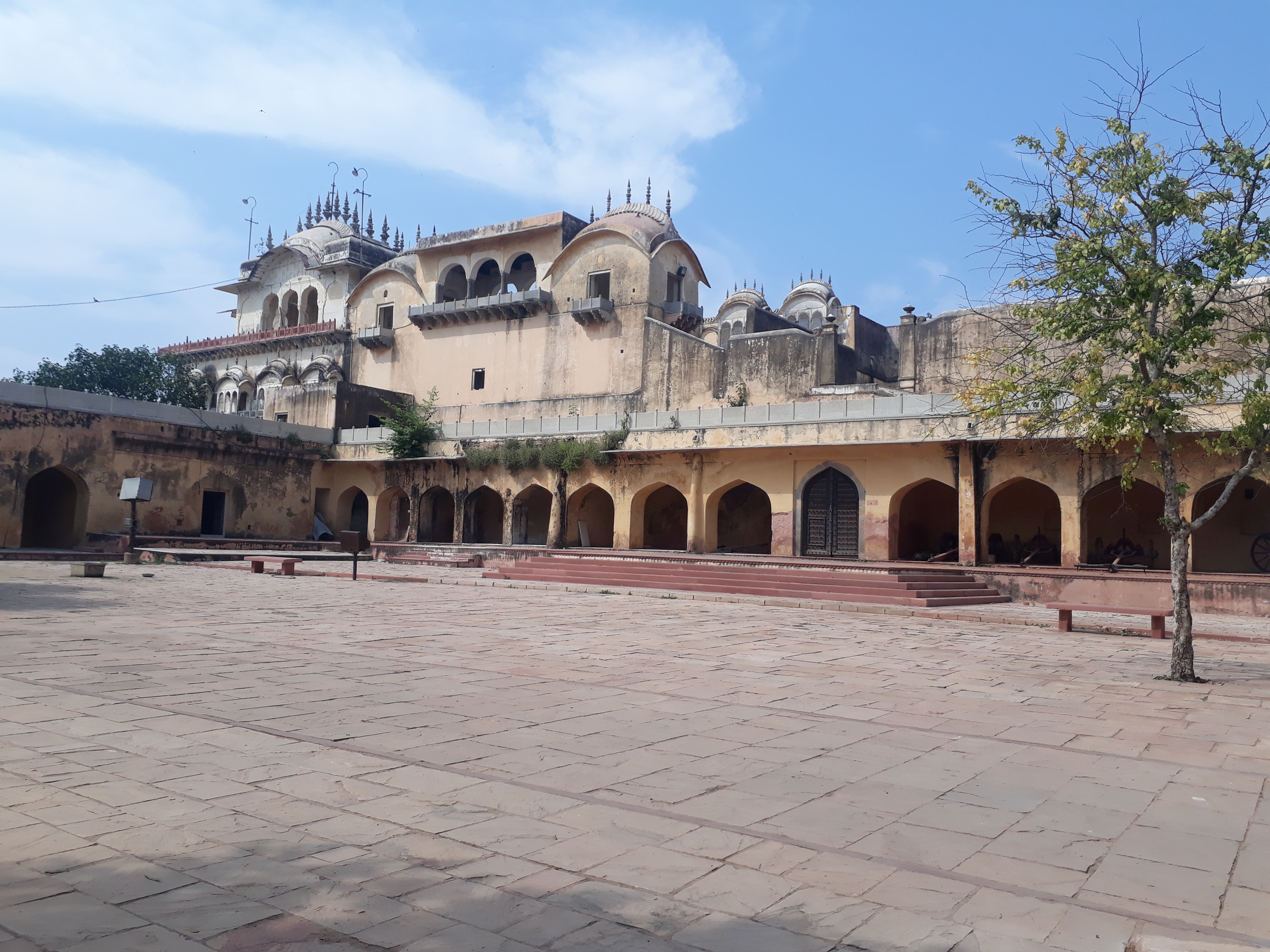
Alwar fort

Bala Qilla (Alwar fort), situated in the Aravali Hills, is said to have never been invaded or conquered by any king. Just behind it is the Nikumbh Mahal. There are many small palaces in the city and an old museum with a collection of paintings, armour, and old weapons.

Neelkanth temple is an old temple dedicated to Lord Shiva, built between the 6th to the 9th century.

=== Bhangarh Haunted Fort ===
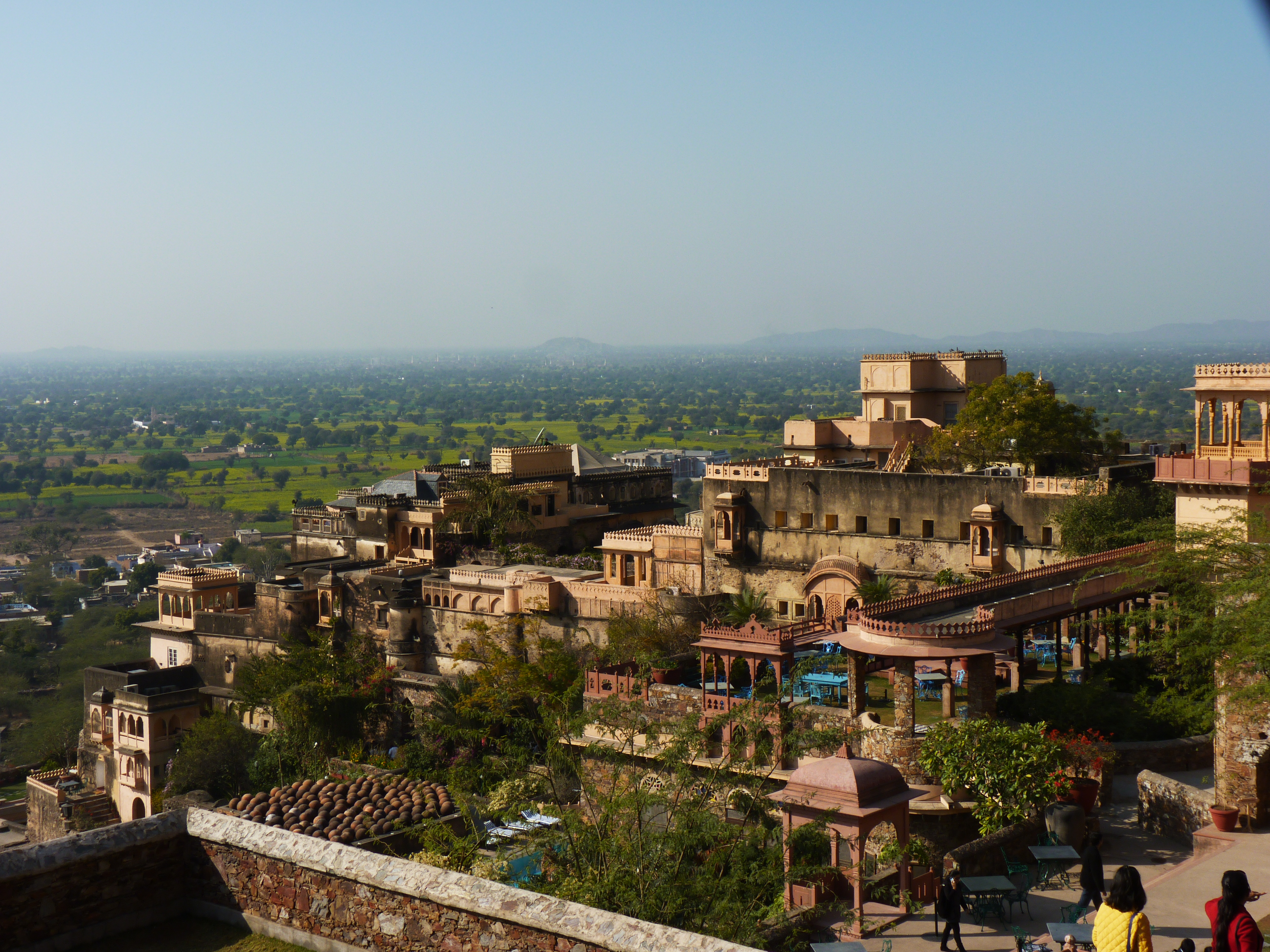
Neemrana Fort Palace near Behror, 70 km from Alwar City

Bhangarh Fort is a haunted fort, and the Archaeological Survey of India has put up a board on the fort gate stating it is prohibited for tourists to stay inside the fort area after sunset and before sunrise. This fort has become a major tourist attraction.

This Royal Rao Haveli (300 years old), Nizam Nagar (Laxmangarh) is only 25 km from Kesroli fort, Agara-Delhi Road. Ruled and established by H.H. Rao Bhero Singh (Riyastdar), who was the relative of H.H Yashwant Singh, the King of Alwar.

Sariska Tiger Reserve is also located in the district, and Arvari and other rivers flows through this district. Hill Fort Kesroli, currently a heritage hotel, is also nearby at Kesroli.

Neemrana is an important heritage fort on NH-48, near Behror.

== Demographics ==
Historical population
Year	Pop.	±% p.a.
1901	851,285	—
1911	811,689	−0.48%
1921	718,788	−1.21%
1931	768,324	+0.67%
1941	843,576	+0.94%
1951	861,896	+0.22%
1961	1,089,561	+2.37%
1971	1,390,724	+2.47%
1981	1,755,217	+2.35%
1991	2,295,648	+2.72%
2001	2,991,552	+2.68%
2011	3,674,179	+2.08%

Religions in residual Alwar district (2011)
Religion	Percent
Hinduism	82.03%
Islam	15.19%
Sikhism	1.87%
Jainism	0.57%
Other or not stated	0.33%

According to the 2011 census, the Alwar district has a population of 3,674,179, roughly equal to the nation of Liberia or the US state of Oklahoma. This gives it a ranking of 77th in India (out of a total of 640). The district has a population density of 438 inhabitants per square kilometre (1,130/sq mi) . Its population growth rate over the decade 2001-2011 was 22.7%. Alwar has a sex ratio of 894 females for every 1000 males, and a literacy rate of 71.68%. 17.81% of the population lives in urban areas. Scheduled Castes and Scheduled Tribes make up 17.77% and 7.87% of the population, respectively. The redrawn district borders contain a population of 2,014,779.

=== Languages ===
Languages in residual Alwar district (2011)
1. Hindi (85.5%)
2. Mewati (8.30%)
3. Punjabi (2.26%)
4. Braj (1.16%)
5. Others (2.77%)

Mewati, Rajasthani, and Rathi are main languages of Alwar. Mewati and Braj are spoken in East Alwar. Ahirwati is spoken in North and West Alwar. Mewati and Jaipuri (Rajasthani) is spoken in South and Southwest Alwar.

At the time of the 2011 census, Hindi was spoken by 85.51% of the population in the residual district, 8.30% Mewati, 2.26% Punjabi, and 1.16% Braj as a first language.

== Transport ==
National Highway NH8 (Delhi-Jaipur-Ajmer-Ahmedabad-Bombay highway) passes through the Behror district. Alwar district is reached from New Delhi by NH8 or by Gurgaon-Sohna-Alwar highway, that is being widened to six lanes.

The Delhi–Mumbai Expressway also passes through the district near Barodameo, connecting it with Gurugram, New Delhi, and Jaipur, amongst other cities. There is a proposed road linking the Trans-Haryana Expressway with the Delhi-Mumbai Expressway, that will pass through the district with connections in Paniyala, Kharithal, Alwar, Ramgarh, and Barodameo.

Delhi-Jaipur railway line also passes through the district. Alwar city railway station is one of the railway stations in the district.
