= Araba Dudawatan =

Village in Rajasthan, India

Coordinates: 26°02′37″N 72°37′07″E

- Village
- Location in Rajasthan, India Araba Dudawatan (India)
- Country: India
- State: Rajasthan
- District: Balotra district

Government
  - Type: Democratic
  - Body: Tehsil

Population (2011)
  - Total: 2,270

Languages
  - Official: Hindi/Marwadi
- Time zone: UTC+5:30 (IST)
- Nearest city: Jodhpur, Balotra

Araba Dudawatan is a large village located in Pachpadra tehsil of Balotra district, Rajasthan, India, with a total of 352 families residing. According to the 2011 census, ARABA Dudawatan village has a population of 2270, of which 1186 are males while 1084 are females.and with Two Higher secondary schools one government Hospital and also 14-15 casts population was leaving in this village.
