= Kaludi =

Village in Rajasthan, India

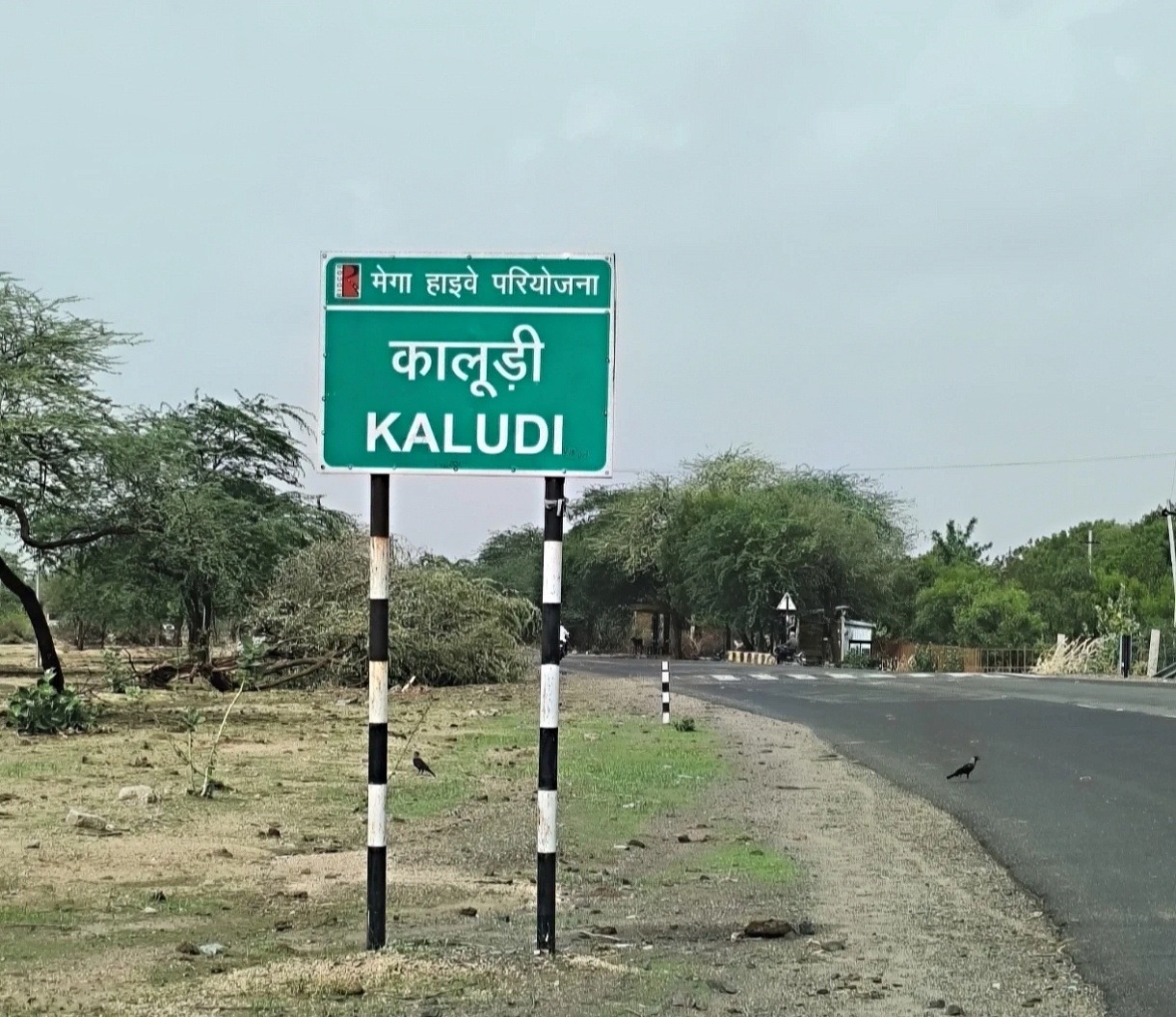
Kaludi kaludi Balotara
- Village
- Location in Rajasthan, India Kaludi (India)
- Coordinates: 25°42′52″N 72°03′20″E
- Country: India
- State: Rajasthan
- District: Balotra district

Government
  - Type: Panchayati Raj
  - Body: Gram Panchayat

Population (2011)
  - Total: 2,876

Languages
  - Official: Hindi, Marwari language
- Time zone: UTC+5:30 (IST)
- Nearest city: Jodhpur, Balotra

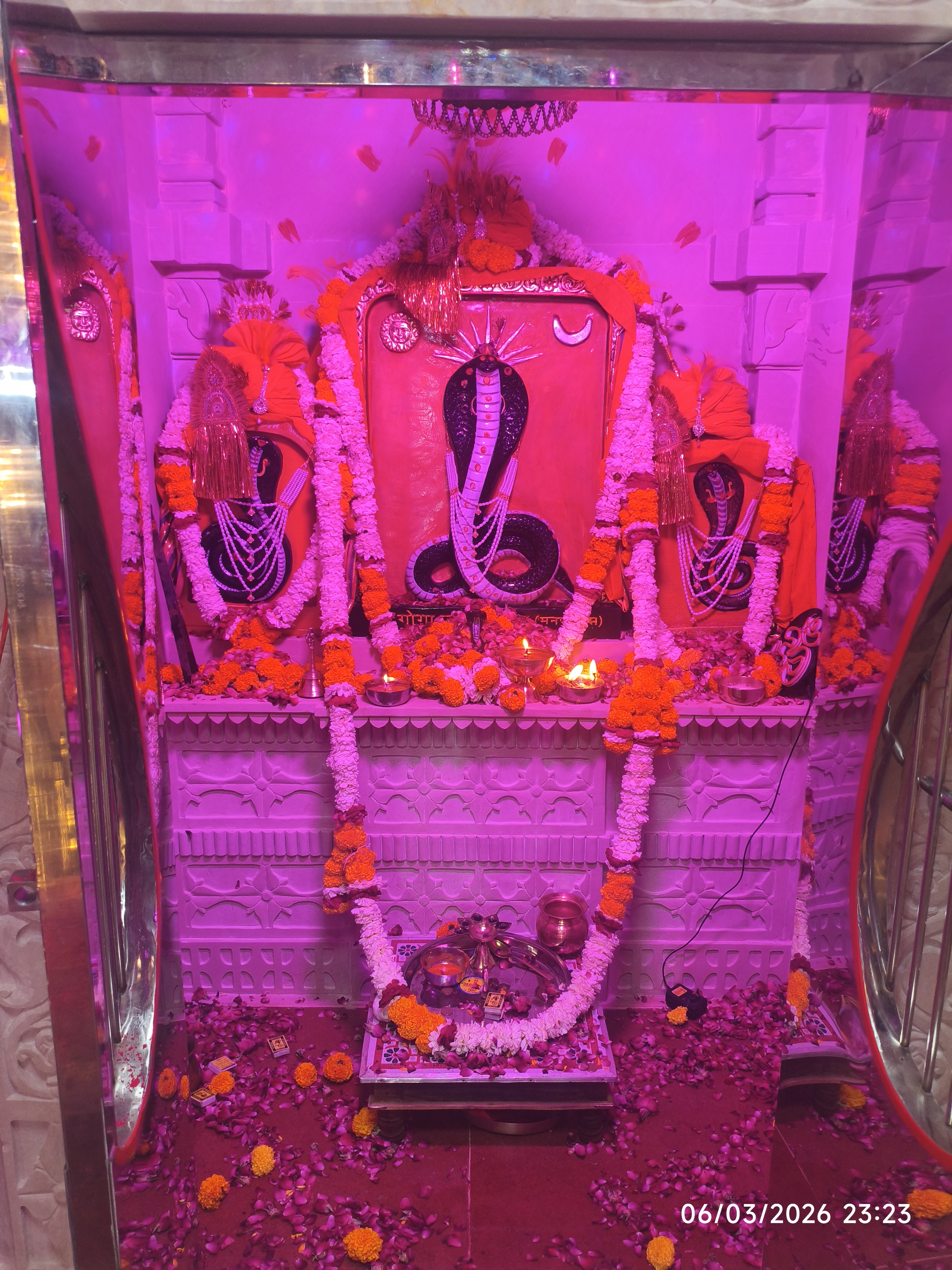
Kaludi

Kaludi is a village in Pachpadra tehsil of Balotra district in Rajasthan, India. As of the 2011 India census, the total population of the village is 2,876.
