= Kharabera Purohitan =

Village in Rajasthan, India

Coordinates: 26°03′18″N 73°07′48″E

Khara Bera Purohitan
- Village
- Location in Rajasthan, India Khara Bera Purohitan (India)
- Country: India
- State: Rajasthan
- District: Balotra district

Government
  - Type: Democratic
  - Body: Tehsil

Population (2011)
  - Total: 3,322

Languages
  - Official: Hindi/Marwadi
- Time zone: UTC+5:30 (IST)
- Nearest city: Jodhpur, Balotra

Khara Bera Purohitan is a village located in Luni Tehsil of Jodhpur district, Rajasthan, India.
