= Dandali =

Village in Rajasthan, India

- Village
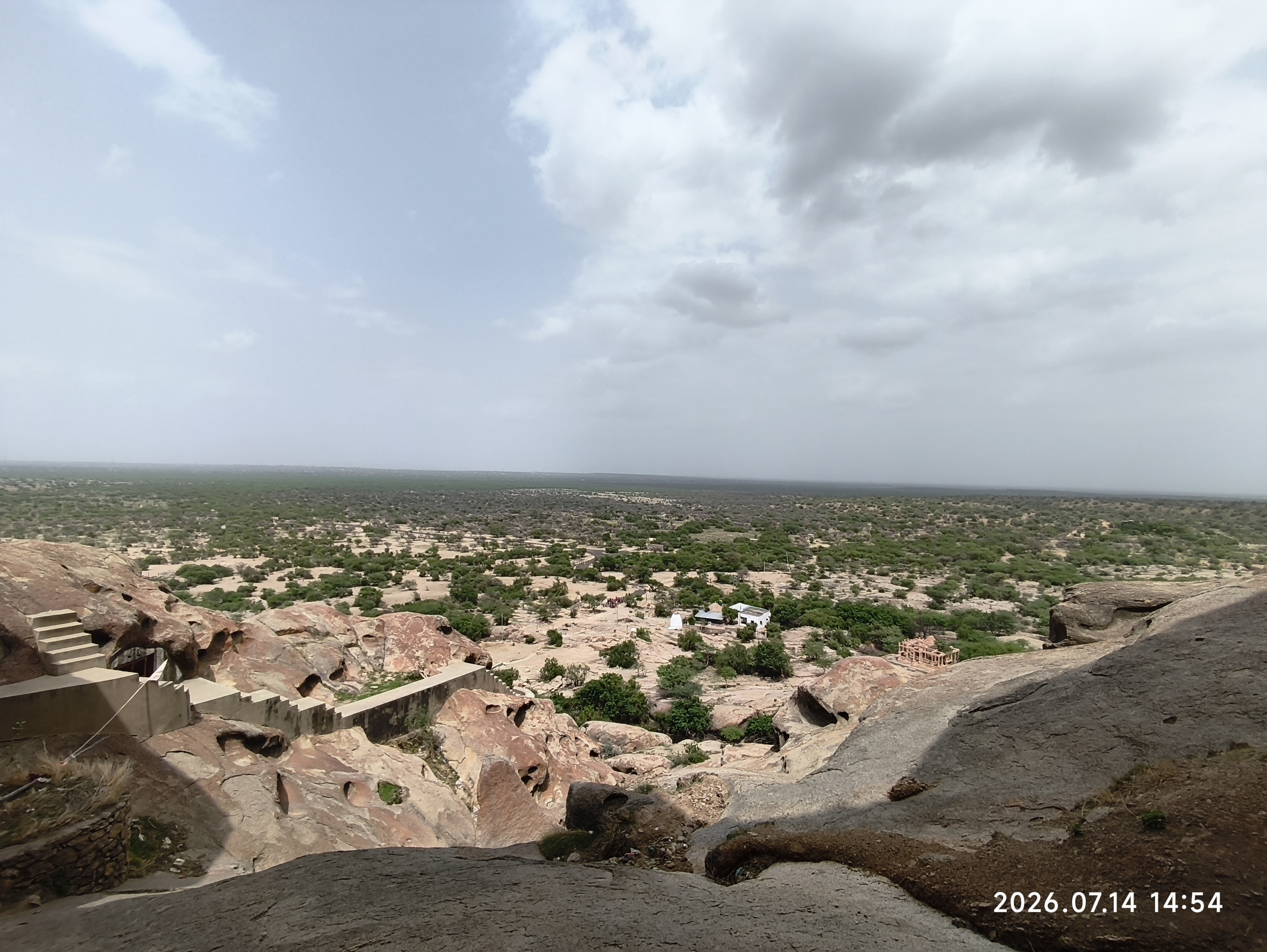

- Location in Rajasthan, India Dandali (India)
- Coordinates: 25°46′45″N 72°14′41″E
- Country: India
- State: Rajasthan
- District: Balotra district

Government
  - Type: Democratic
  - Body: Tehsil

Population (2011)
  - Total: 1,862

Languages
  - Official: Hindi/Marwadi
- Time zone: UTC+5:30 (IST)
- Nearest city: Jodhpur, Balotra

Dandali (डंडाली) is a village in Sindhari tehsil in the Balotra district of Rajasthan state, India. It belongs to Jodhpur Division.
