= Kanana, Balotra =

Village in Rajasthan, India

Kanana
- Village
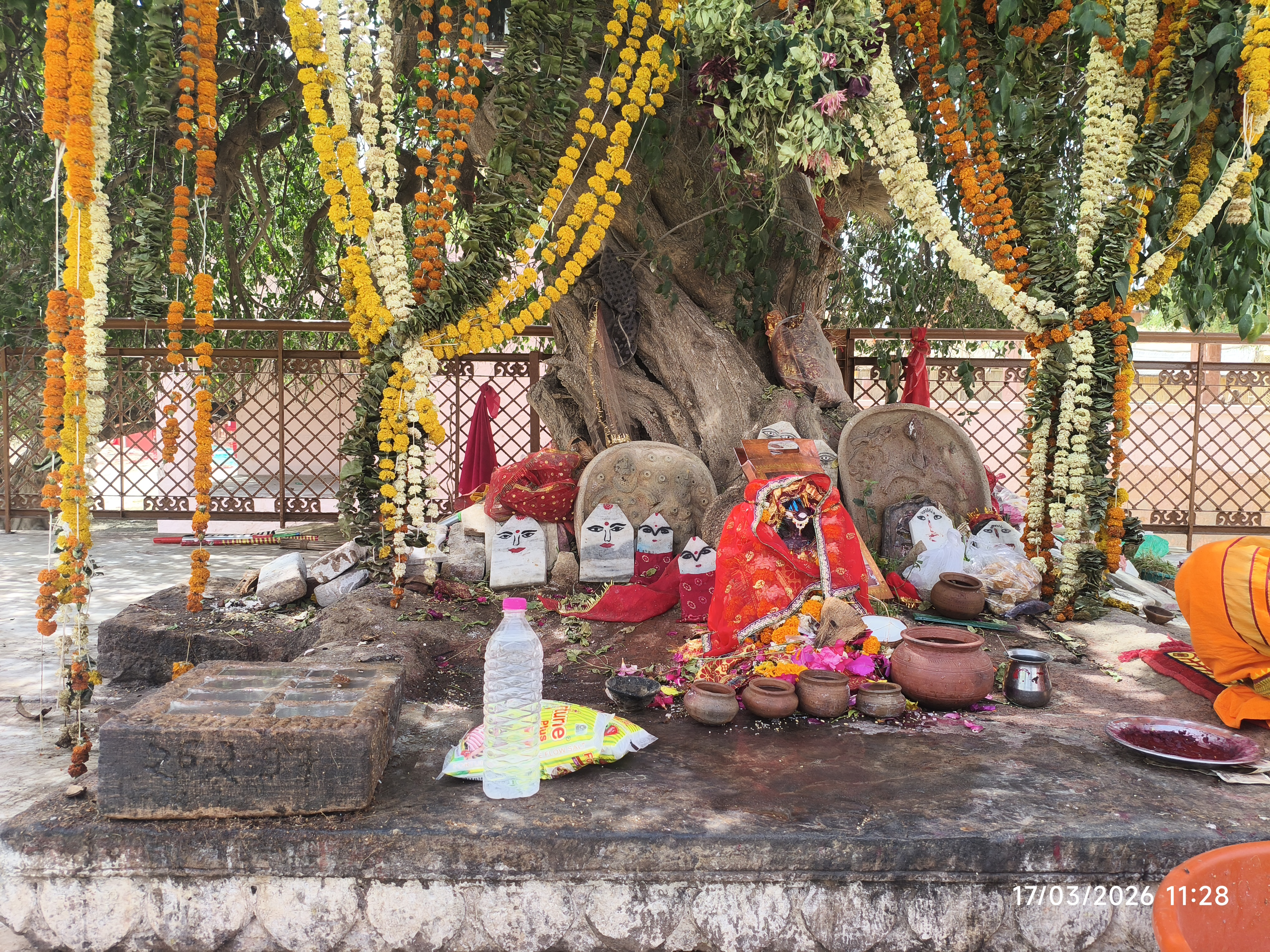
- Sheetla Mata Temple (Kanana, Balotra)

- Location in Rajasthan, India Kanana (India)
- Coordinates: 25°48′15″N 72°24′33″E
- Country: India
- State: Rajasthan
- District: Balotra district

Government
  - Type: Democratic
  - Body: Grampanchayat

Population (2011)
  - Total: 5,668

Languages
  - Official: Hindi
- Time zone: UTC+5:30 (IST)
- Nearest city: Balotra

Kanana is a village located in Pachpadra Tehsil of Balotra district, Rajasthan, India, with total 965 families residing. The Kanana village has population of 5,668 of which 2,824 are males while 2,844 are females as per Population Census 2011.

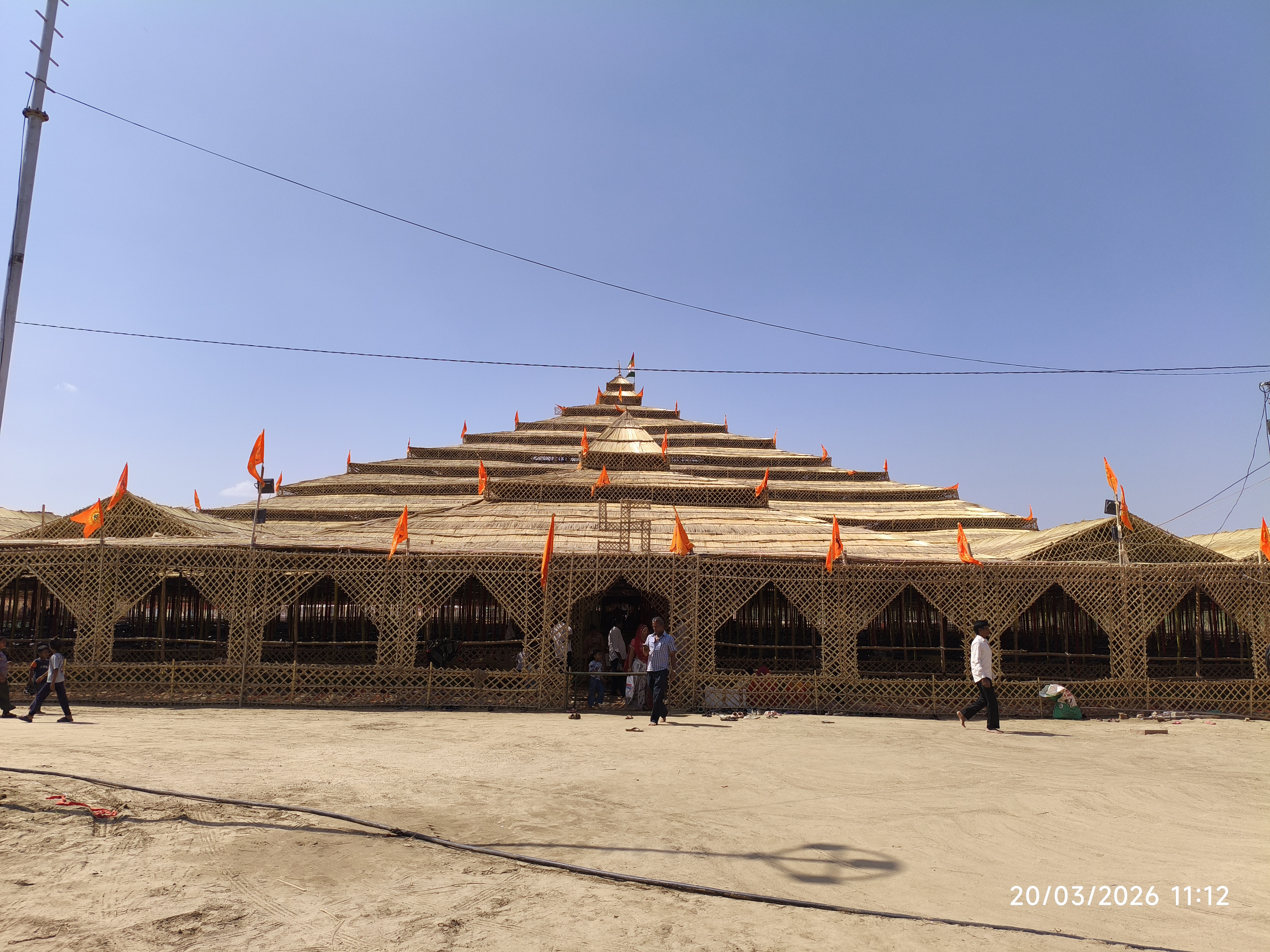
Sri Lalitha Tripurasundari Mahayagya,(Kanana, Balotra)

== Gellery ==
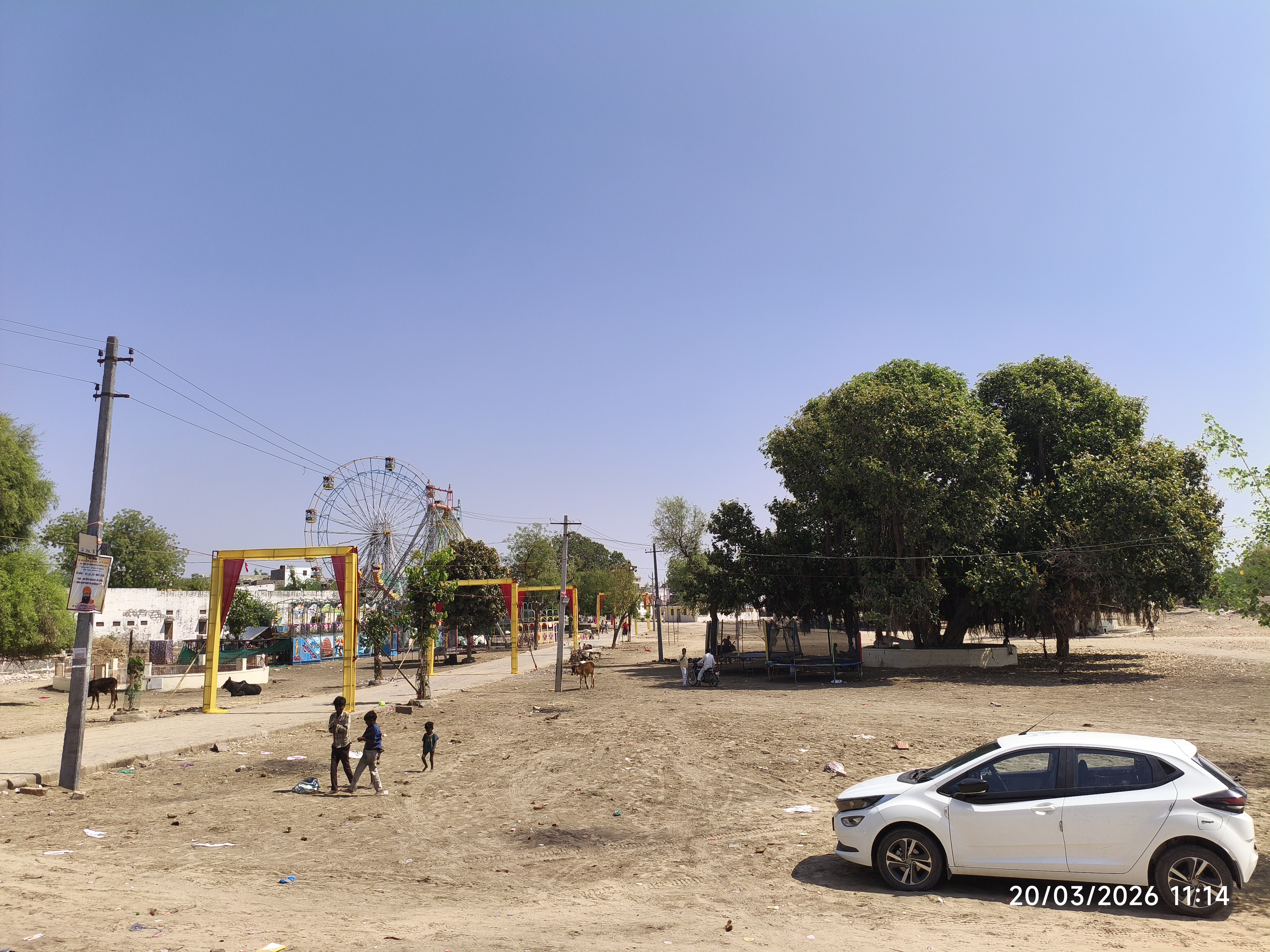
Kanana, village Balotra

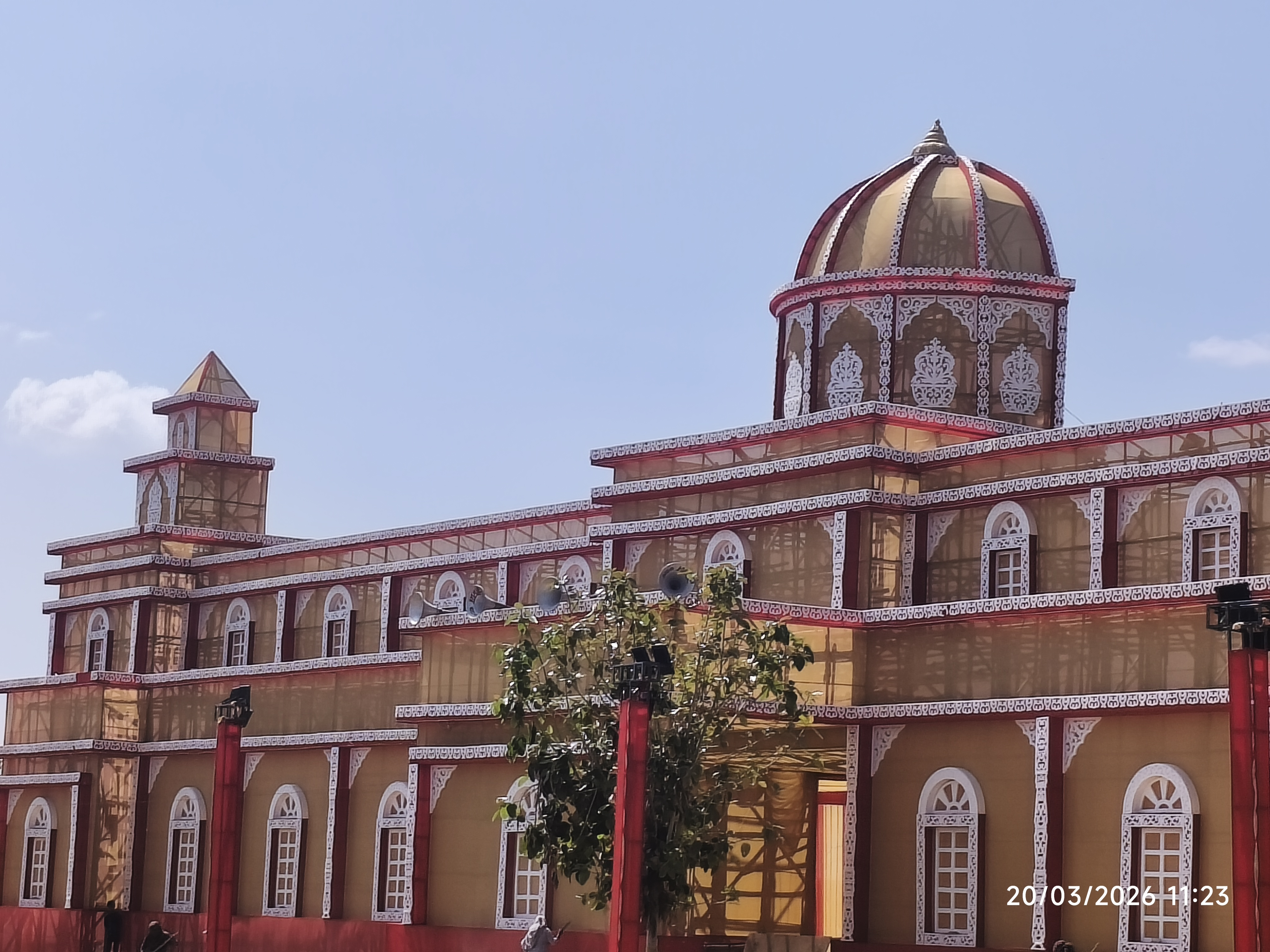
Kanana
