= Sarawadi Purohitan =

Village in Rajasthan, India

Coordinates: 26°00′23″N 72°28′49″E

- Village
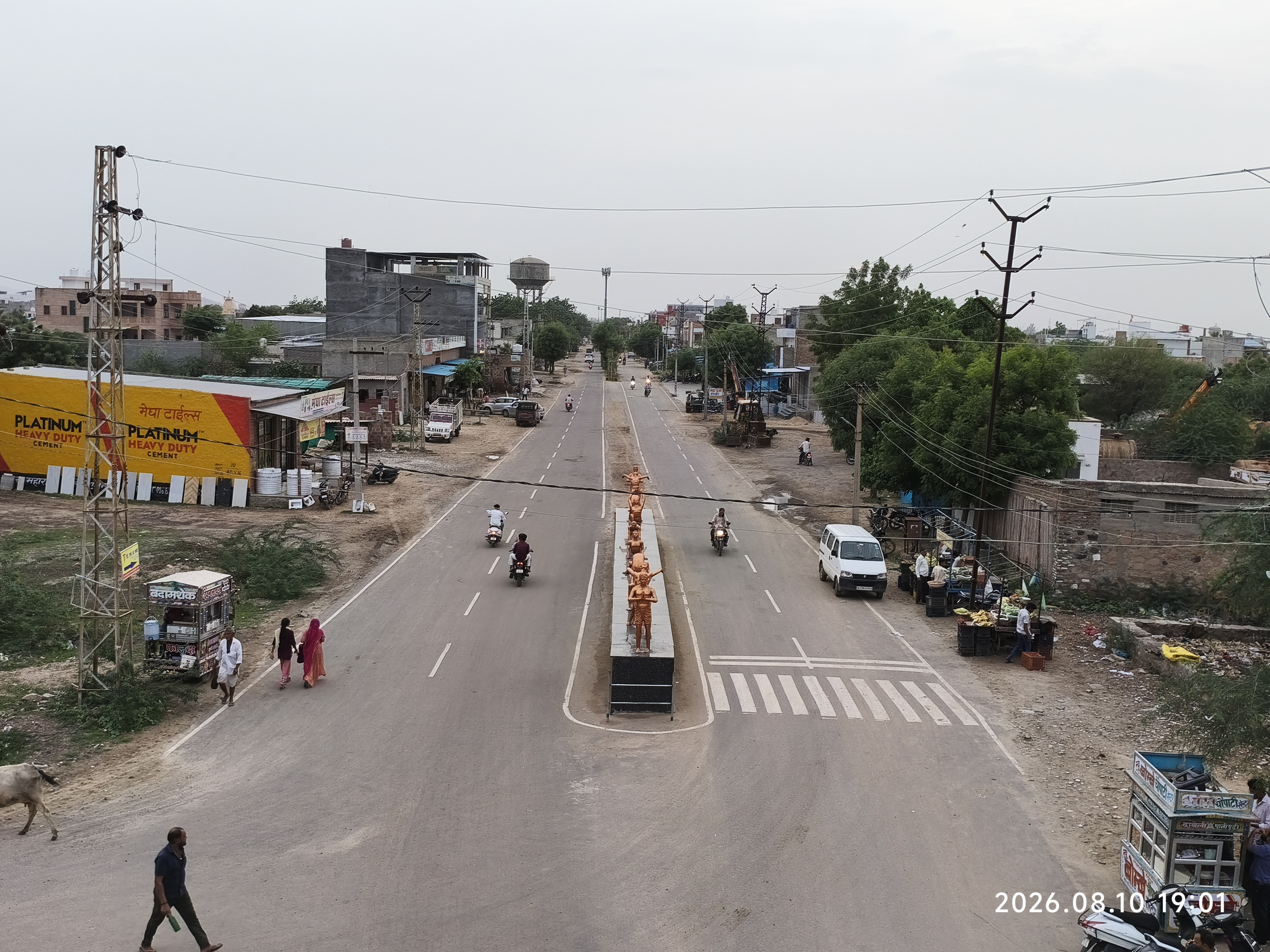

- Location in Rajasthan, India Sarawadi Purohitan (India)
- Country: India
- State: Rajasthan
- District: Balotra district

Government
  - Type: Democratic
  - Body: Tehsil

Population (2011)
  - Total: 3,967

Languages
  - Official: Hindi/Marwadi
- Time zone: UTC+5:30 (IST)
- Nearest city: Jodhpur, Balotra

Sarawadi Purohitan is a village located in Pachpadra tehsil of Balotra district, Rajasthan, India, with a total of 768 families residing there. Sarawadi village has a population of 3,967 of which 2,102 are males while 1,865 are females as per Population Census 2011.

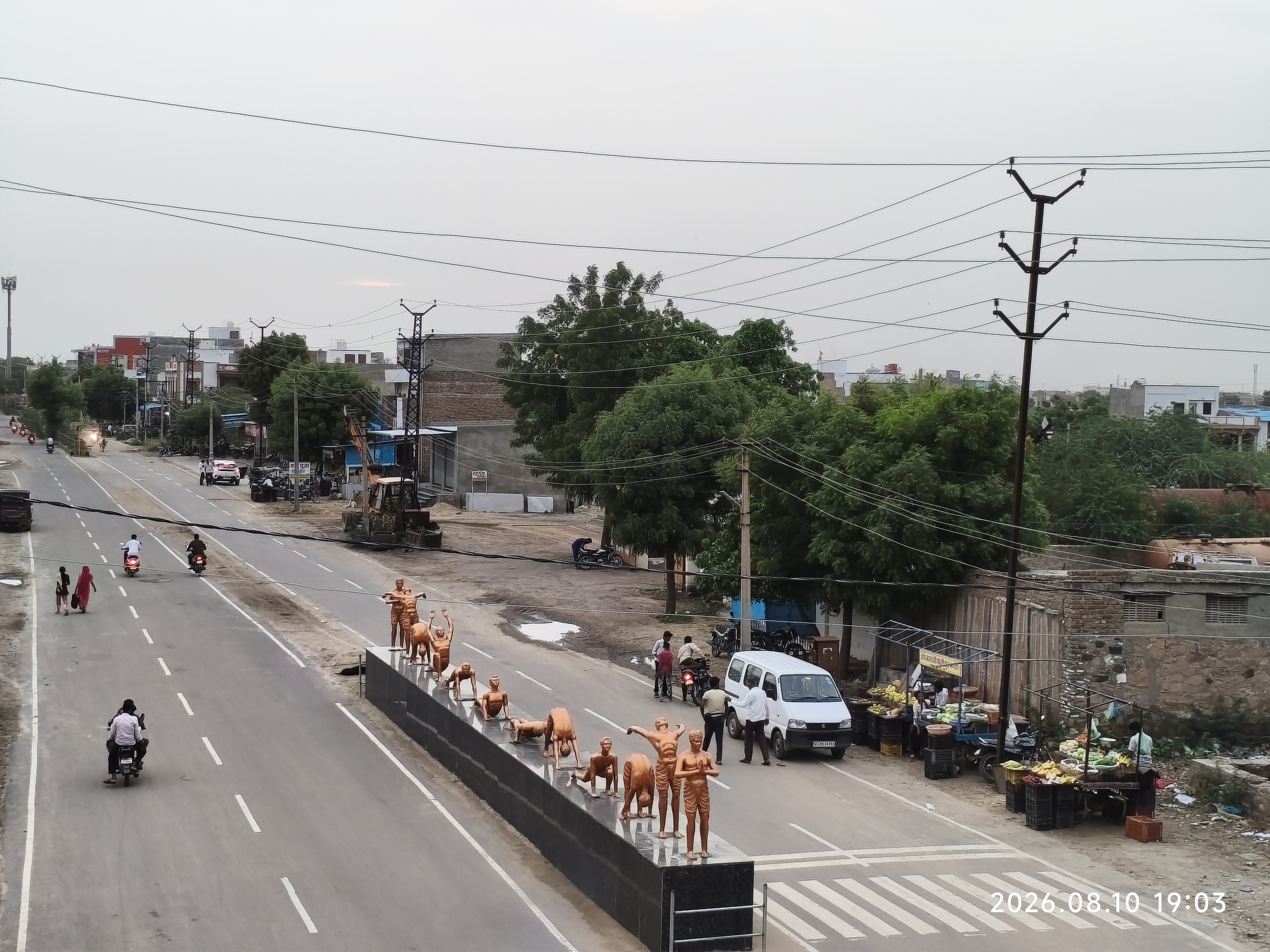
Sarawadi Purohitan Village
