= Rani Bhatiyani Temple =

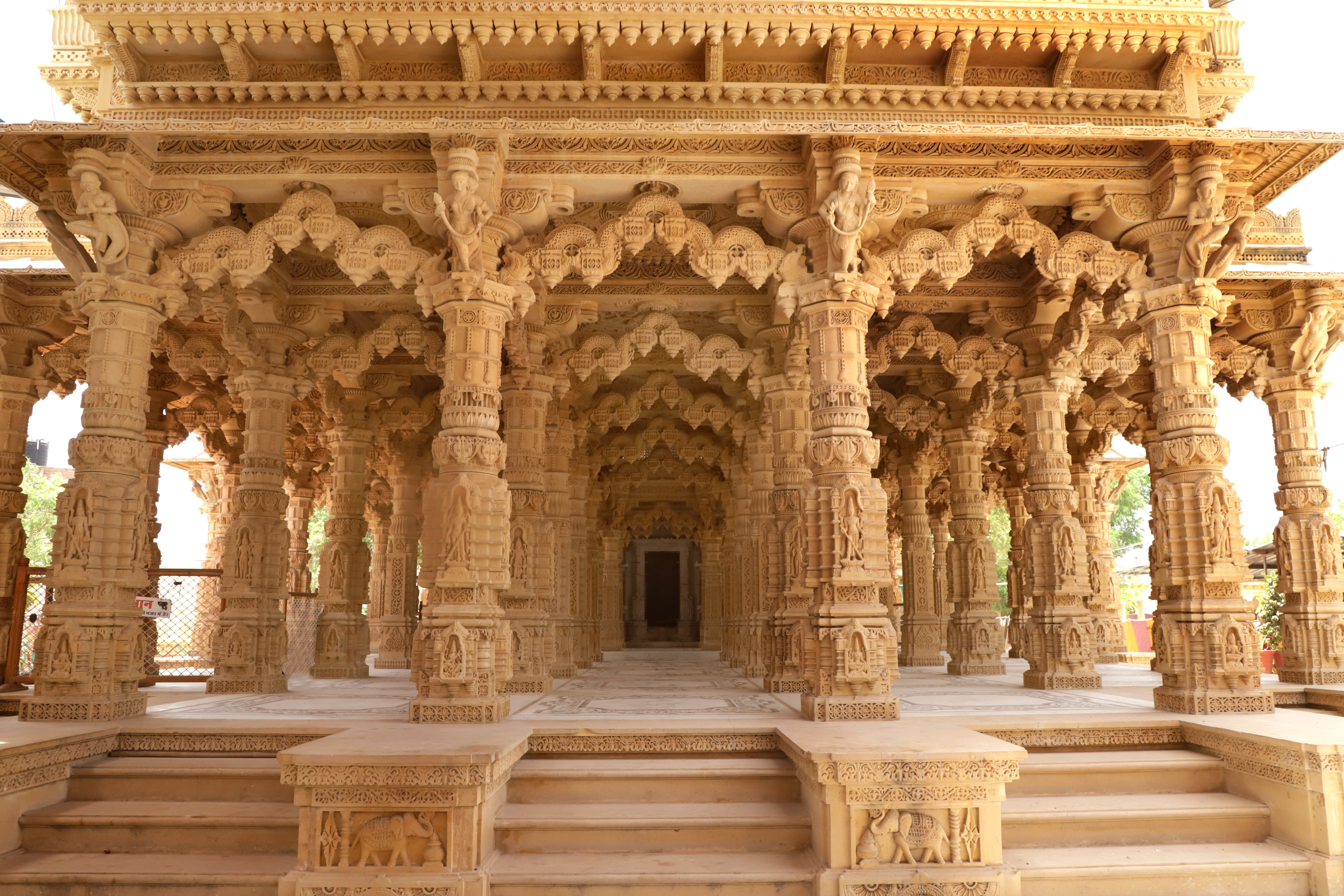

- Location in Rajasthan Rani Bhatiyani Temple (India)

Religion
- Affiliation: Hinduism
- District: JasolBalotra
- Deity: Rani Bhatiyani
- Festivals: Four Day Theerth Yatra in April, Navaratri

Location
- State: Rajasthan
- Country: India
- Coordinates: 25.49°N 72.13°E

Rani Bhatiyani Temple in Jasol, also known as Majisa Mandir, is a revered Hindu shrine dedicated to the goddess Mata Rani Bhatiyani. Located on the Nakoda-Balotra road in the Balotra district of Rajasthan, the temple is a popular pilgrimage site and a major attraction for devotees.

== Temple features and architecture ==
- The newer temple is an example of Rajasthani architecture, with intricate carvings from

Temple of Shri Rani Bhatiyani Mandir

Jaisalmer stone.

- The sanctum contains an idol of Rani Bhatiyani, decorated with vibrant garments and ornaments.

Devotees visit the temple throughout the year to seek blessings.
