= Tirsingri Sodha =

- Village
- Location in Rajasthan, India Tirsingri Sodha (India)
- Coordinates: 26°04′02″N 72°26′26″E
- Country: India
- State: Rajasthan
- District: Balotra district

Government
  - Type: Government of Rajasthan
  - Body: Gram Panchayat

Population (2011)
  - Total: 2,048

Languages
  - Official: Hindi; Marwari
- Time zone: UTC+5:30 (IST)
- Nearest city: Balotra

Tirsingri Sodha is a village located in Pachpadra Tehsil of Balotra district, Rajasthan, India, with total 334 families residing. The Tirsingri Sodha village has population of 2048 of which 1077 are males while 971 are females as per Population Census 2011.
