= Pachpadra Lake =

- Location within Rajasthan
- Interactive map of Pachpadra Lake
- Location: Pachpadra, Balotra District, Rajasthan, India
- Coordinates: 25.929°N 72.2466°E
- Type: Saline lake
- Settlements: Balotra city

The Pachpadra Lake is a salt lake in Pachpadra near Balotra city in Balotra district in the Indian state of Rajasthan. Its sodium chloride level is marked at 98%. kharwal community that produces salt from pachpadra lake. The best quality salt is produce here because it contains 98% sodium chloride content in it. Morli bush is used for salt production in this lake.The local Khara (Kharwal) community has traditionally produced high quality salt crystals at Pachpadra Lake using indigenous methods involving the Morli shrub that has been handed over since generations..

== See also ==
- List of lakes in India
