= Majivala =

Village in Rajasthan, India

- Village
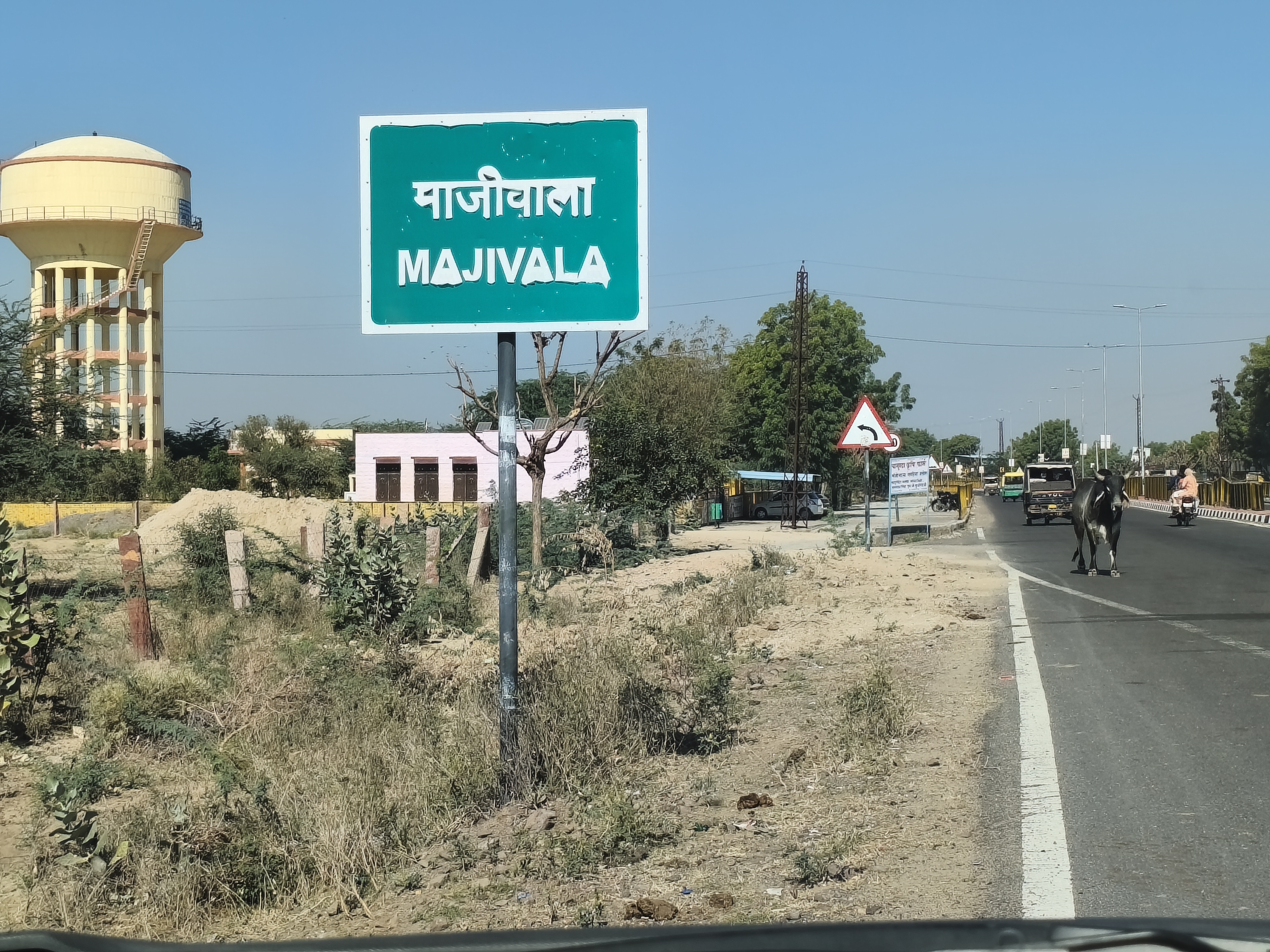

- Location in Rajasthan, India Majivala (India)
- Coordinates: 25°46′45″N 72°14′41″E
- Country: India
- State: Rajasthan
- District: Balotra district

Government
  - Type: Democratic
  - Body: Tehsil

Population (2011)
  - Total: 5,882

Languages
  - Official: Hindi/Marwadi
- Time zone: UTC+5:30 (IST)
- Nearest city: Jodhpur, Balotra

Majivala village in Pachpadra tehsil of Balotra district in Rajasthan, India. As of the 2011 India census, the total population of the village is 5882.

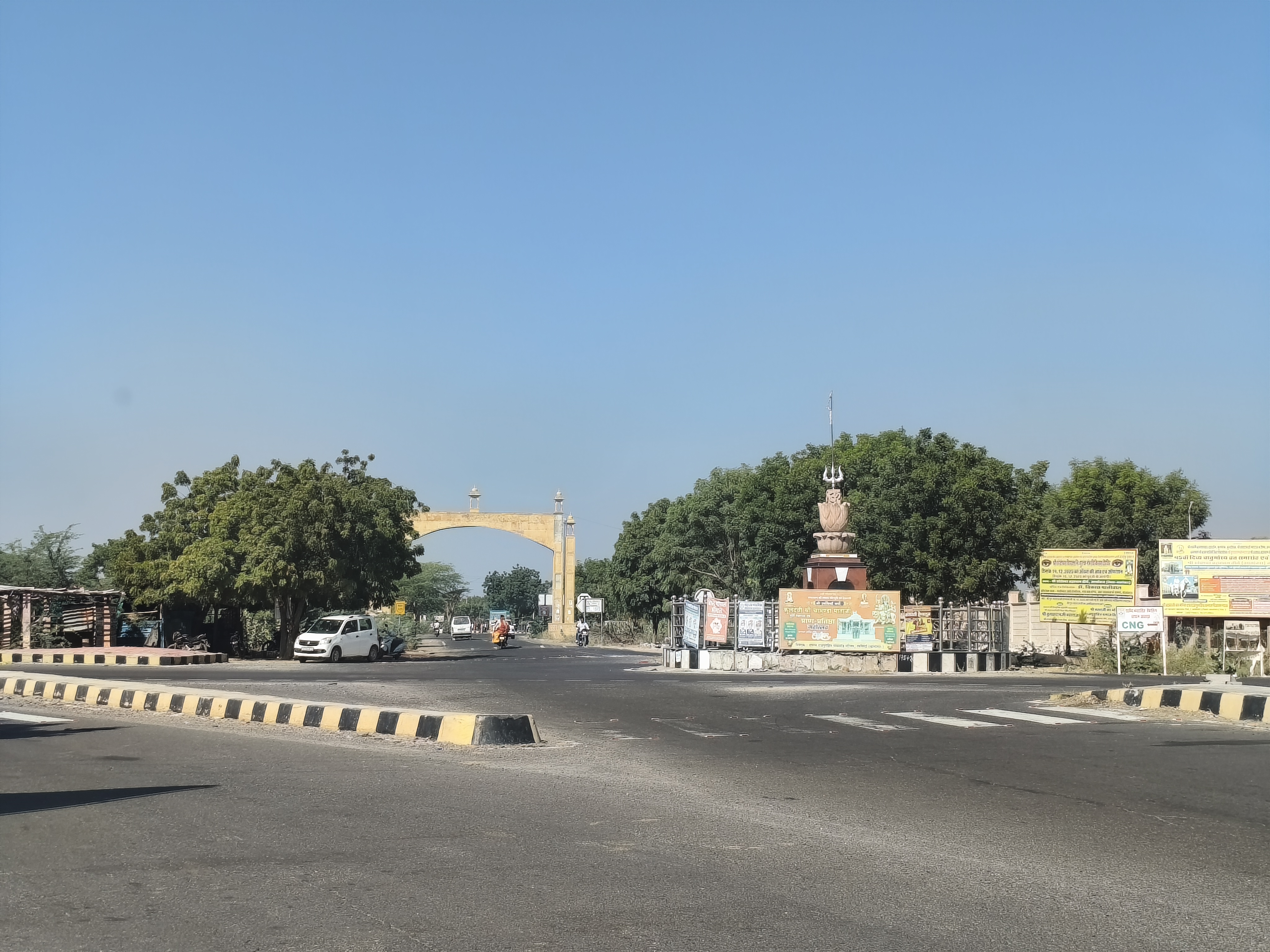
Majivala Village.

== Location ==
Majivala is a village located in the Pachpadra tehsil of the Balotra district in the Indian state of Rajasthan.

== Population ==
According to the 2011 census, the village has a total population of 5,882 people.

== Language ==
The official languages of the village are Hindi and Marwari.
