= Dheedhas =

Village in balotara Rajasthan, India

- Village
- Location in Rajasthan, India
- Coordinates: 25.8374°N 72.7739°E
- Country: India
- State: Rajasthan
- District: Balotra

Languages
  - Official: Hindi, Marwadi
- Time zone: UTC+5:30 (IST)
- Postal code: 344021
- Vehicle registration: Rj 39
- Nearest city: Jodhpur, Balotra

Dheedhas is a village of Balotra District in Rajasthan, northern India. Samuja and Dheedas are two villages in Dheedhas Gram Panchayat.The village is located in the Samdari tehsil. The village is surrounded by rivers Sukri and Luni on both sides of the village. Luni flows in the west of the village and Sukri flows in the east. Bajra, wheat bread and vegetables is the primary food of the villagers. Farmer families reside more in the village. Crops are grown predominantly in the rainy season. Wells are the main means of irrigation in the village. Dheedhas has a total population of 2,097 people according to Census 2011.

== Temples ==
- Shri 1008 Shri Hari Ram Ji Maharaj Dham Dheedhas, Samdari
- Shiv Temple Bageshi Dheedhas
- Ram Sarowar (Shiv Temple Dheedhas)

== School ==
- Govt. Sr Sec. School Dheedhas
- Govt Girls School Dheedhas
