= Bithuja =

- Village
- Bithooja (बिठूजा)
- Location in Balotra Rajasthan Bithuja (India)
- Coordinates: 25.83°N 72.23°E
- Country: India
- State: Rajasthan
- District: Balotra

Area
  - Total: 2,233 ha (5,520 acres)

Population (2011)
  - Total: 4,870
- Time zone: UTC+5:30 (IST)
- PIN: 344022
- ISO 3166 code: RJ-IN

Bithuja is a village in Balotra taluk, Balotra district, Rajasthan, India. Bithooja has a total population of 4,870 peoples according to Census 2011.

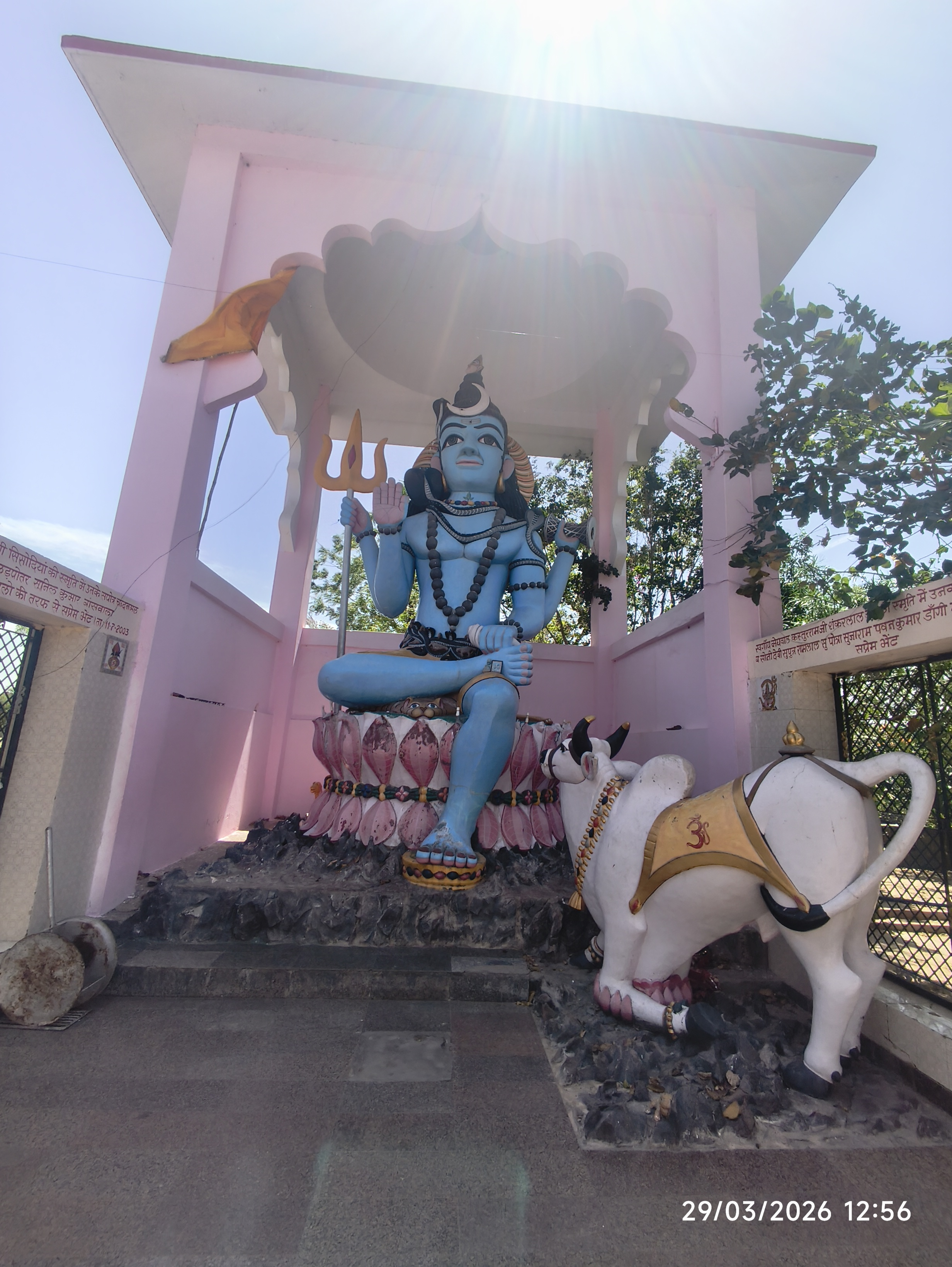
Bithuja Mahadev

== Population ==
As per the 2011 Census, it had a population of approximately 4,870 people, though more recent estimates suggest it has grown to over 7,400.
