= Jasol =

Village in Rajasthan, India

- Village
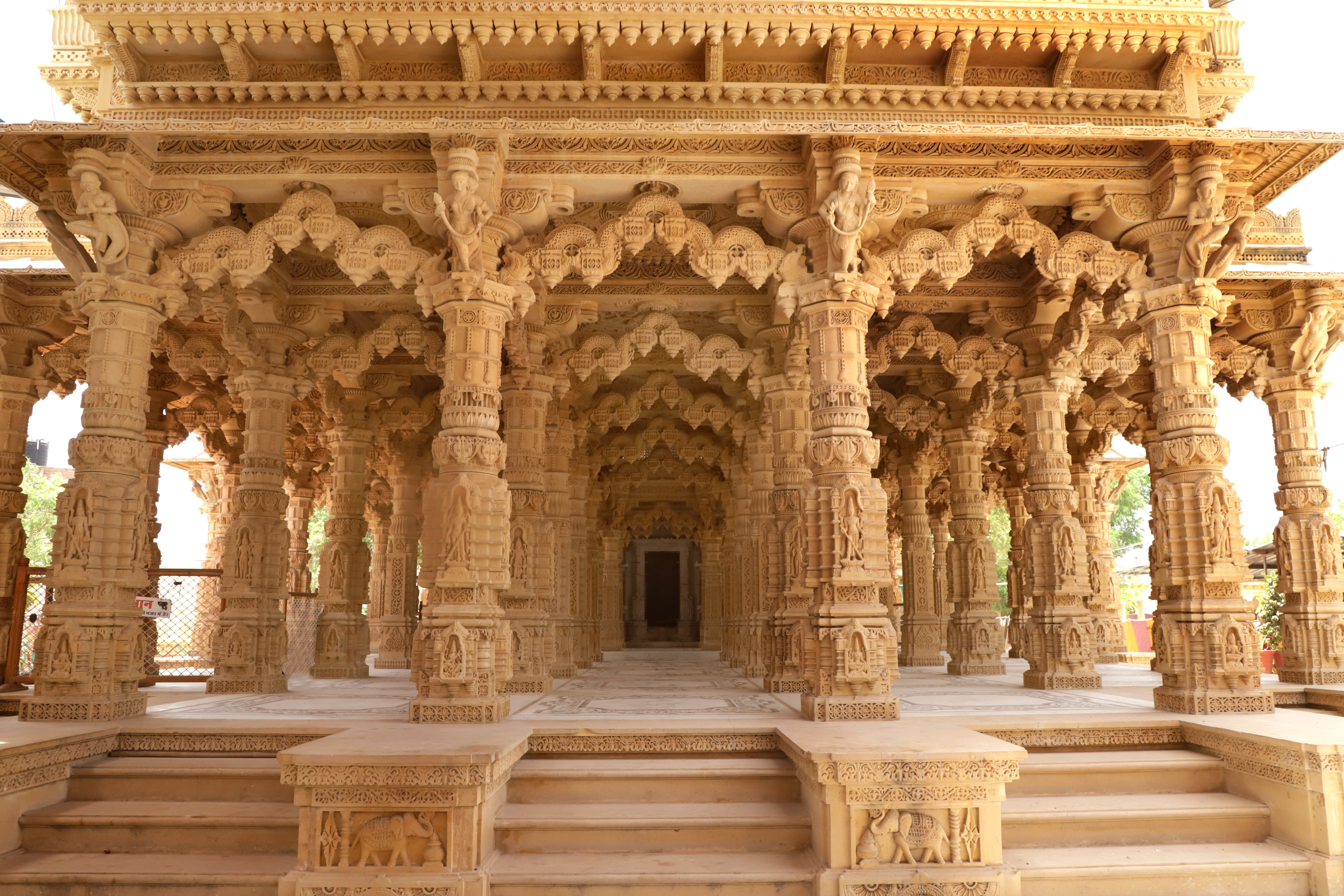
- Temple of Shri Rani Bhatiyani Ji Mandir

- Location in Rajasthan, India Jasol (India)
- Coordinates: 25.49°N 72.13°E
- Country: India
- State: Rajasthan
- District: Balotra district
- Elevation: 107 m (351 ft)

Population (2011)
  - Total: 15,552

Languages
  - Official: Hindi
  - Additional official: English
- Time zone: UTC+5:30 (IST)
- PIN: 344024
- Telephone code: 02988
- ISO 3166 code: RJ-IN
- Vehicle registration: RJ-39
- Sex ratio: 935 ♂/♀

Jasol is a village in Pachpadra tehsil of Balotra District of the Indian state of Rajasthan.The historical village of Jasol, the capital of the former Malani area was ruled by the independent Mahecha clan of the Rathore Rajputs. It includes cenotaphs, and the temple of Rani Bhatiyani. The horses of the indigenous Malani breed are raised there.

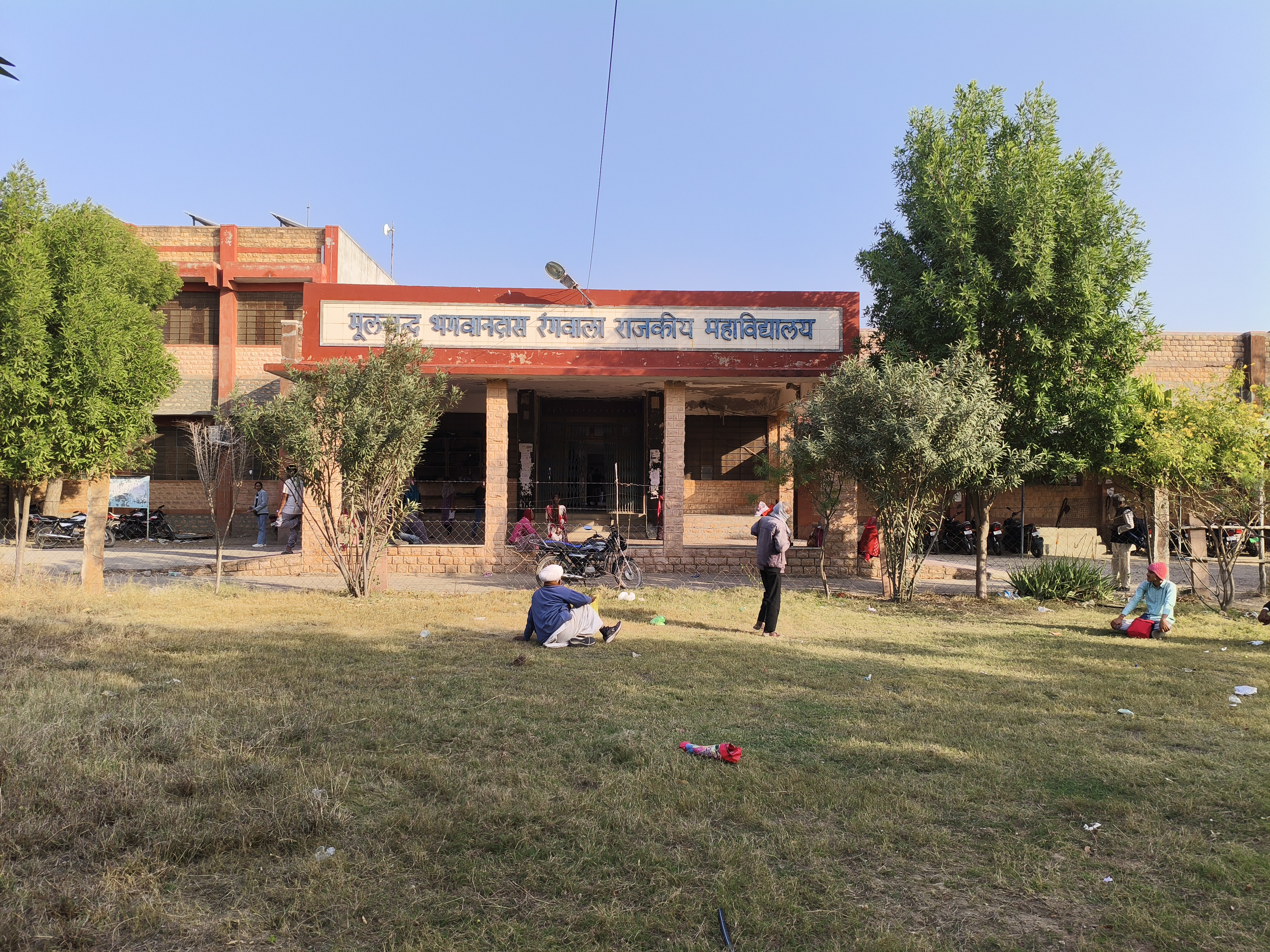
MBR GOVT. PG College, Jasol BALOTRA

== History ==
=== Establishment ===
The village was established by the Rathore rulers. The Rathores of Jasol, who are the descendants of Rawal Mallinath, are the eldest amongst all houses of Rathores, Mahecha Rathores. Rawal Mallinath was the eldest son of Rawal Salkhaji, Salkhaji's other two son were Viramdeo and Jaitmal.

=== Rawal Mallinathji ===
Rawal Mallinath was a warrior-saint and songs of his heroic valour and saintly attitude are still sung by folk singers of western Rajasthan. His wife Rani Rupade was also a saint; bhajans composed by her are still popular in Western Rajasthan. Rawal Mallinath was an ardent horse lover, annual cattle fair by the name of Rawal Mallinath cattle fair is held every year at Tilwara village in the Luni river near Jasol. It is said that the cattle breeders after praying Rawal Mallinath dig the dry river just by their hands and pits of water are filled for the cattle. This phenomenon only takes place during the cattle fair. Hundreds of horse breeders of the indigenous Marwari, Kathiawari and Sindhi breeds of horses attend the annual fanfare along with several camel breeders, cattle owners of breeds like Tharparkar and Kankerj breeds of cows attend the fair.

== Demographics ==
As of 2011 Indian Census, Jasol had a total population of 15,552, of which 8,115 were males and 7,437 were females. Population within the age group of 0 to 6 years was 2,682. The total number of literates in Jasol was 8,658, which constituted 55.7% with male literacy of 67.5% and female literacy of 42.8%. The effective literacy rate of 7+ population of Jasol was 67.3%, of which male literacy rate was 82.1% and female literacy rate was 51.3%. The Scheduled Castes and Scheduled Tribes population was 1,974 and 981 respectively. Jasol had 2674 households in 2011.

== Places of interest ==
=== Rani Bhatiyani Temple ===
Temple of Shri Rani Bhatiyani Mandir

There is an old fort, cenotaphs, and a Temple of Shri Rani Bhatiyani Mandir, the wife of the erstwhile ruler of Jasol.

The building where the current police station is situated was the office of the British Resident Commissioner of the Malani Paragana.

== Notable people ==
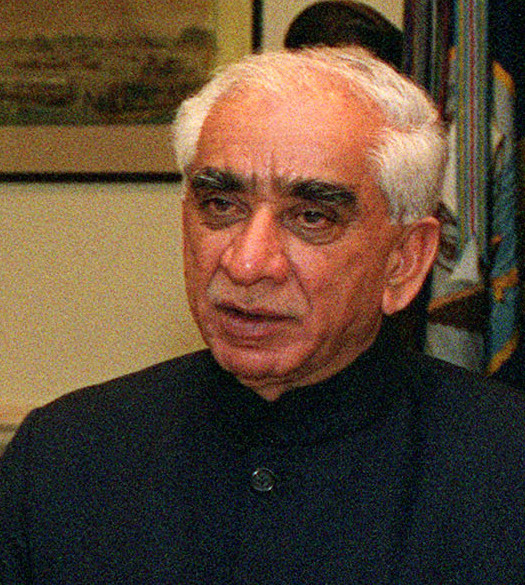
Jaswant Singh

- Jaswant Singh, Bharatiya Janata Party (BJP) leader and ex finance, defence and foreign minister of India was born in Jasol.
- Lt. Gen. Hanut Singh Rathore, military strategist of the Indian Army
