= Jethantari =

Village in Rajasthan, India

- Village
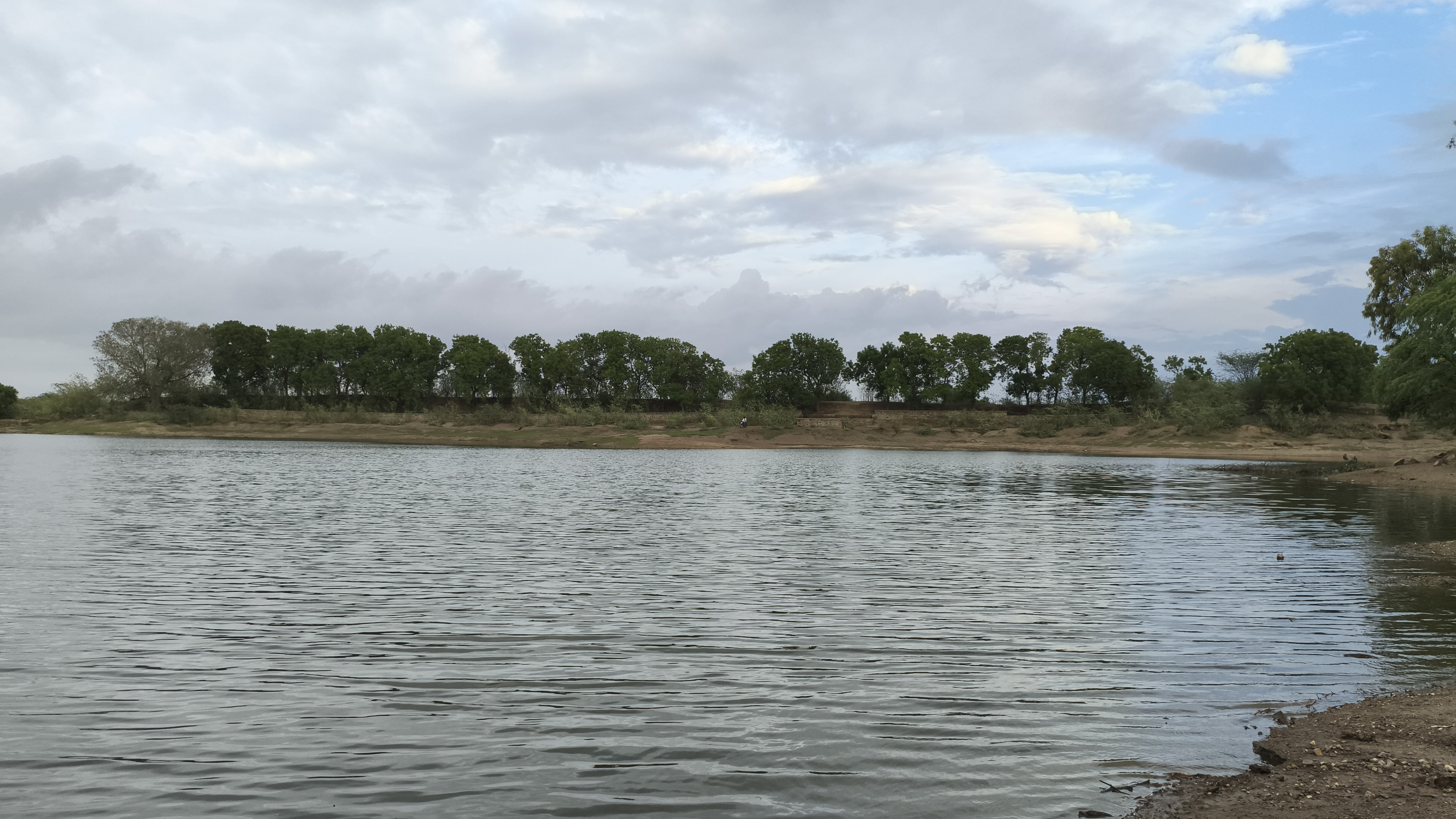
- Interactive map of Jethantari
- Coordinates: 25°48′32″N 72°28′35″E
- Country: India
- State: Rajasthan
- District: Balotra district

Government
  - Type: Democratic
  - Body: Tehsil

Population (2011)
  - Total: 2,505

Languages
  - Official: Hindi/Marwadi
- Time zone: UTC+5:30 (IST)
- Nearest city: Jodhpur, Balotra

Jethantari village in Pachpadra tehsil of Balotra district in Rajasthan, India.As of the 2011 India census, the total population of the village is 2505.
