= Chandesara =

Village in Rajasthan, India

- Village
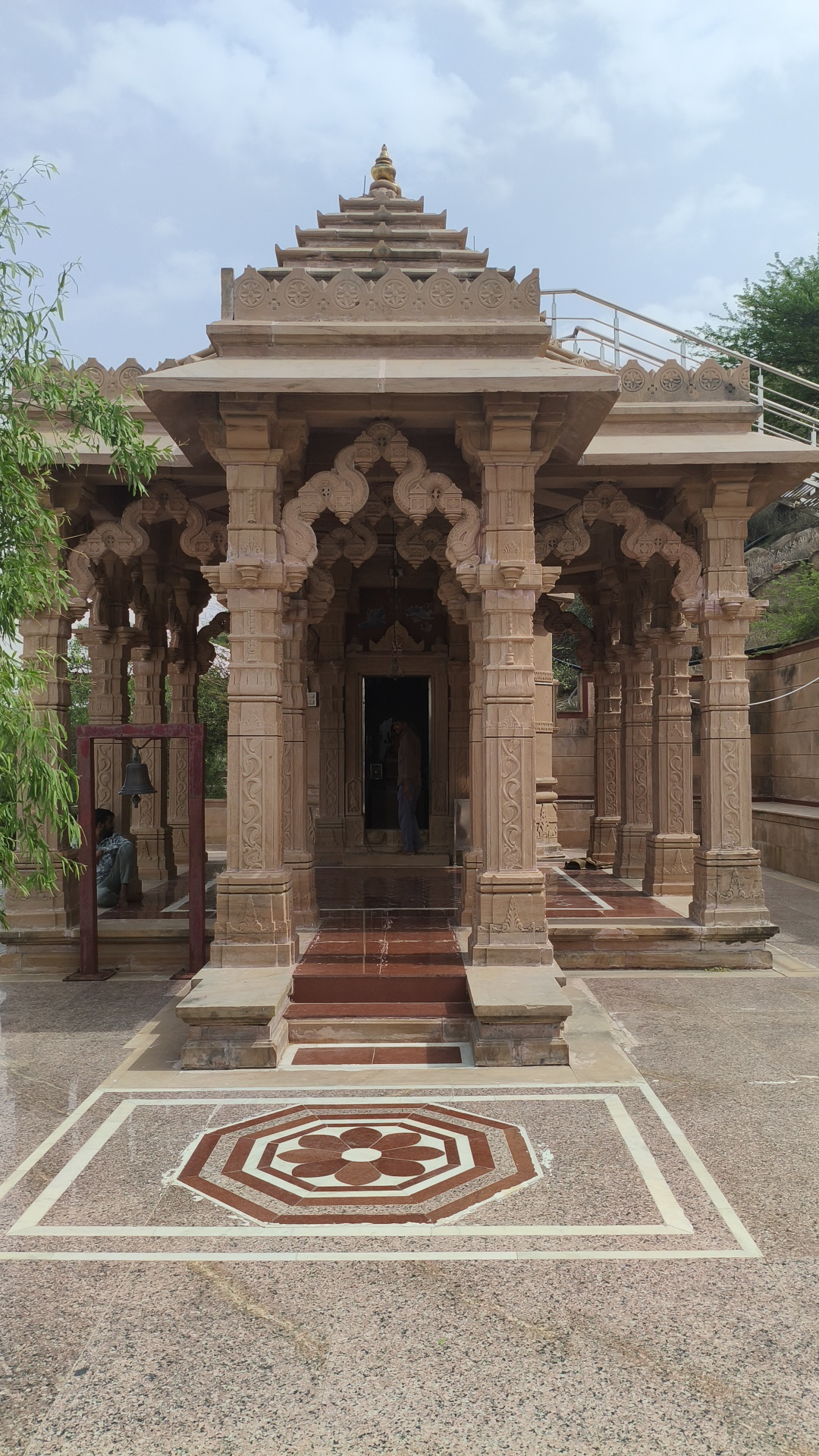
- Country: India
- State: Rajasthan
- District: Balotra district

Government
  - Type: Democratic
  - Body: Tehsil

Population (2011)
  - Total: 2,661

Languages
  - Official: Hindi/Marwadi
- Time zone: UTC+5:30 (IST)
- Nearest city: Jodhpur, Balotra

Chandesara(चांदेसरा) village in the Barmer (now Balotra district) of Rajasthan, India. As of the 2011 India census, the total population of the village is 2661.

== Population ==
Chandesara, a village in Balotra's Pachpadra Tehsil, Rajasthan, had aof 2,661 (2011 Census) with slightly more males (1,363) than females (1,298), a 952 sex ratio, and a 64.9% literacy rate, with males significantly out-literating females (79.75% vs 49.4%). Key demographics show 17% of the population were children (0-6 years) and it's governed by an elected Sarpanch.
