= Budiwada =

Village in Rajasthan

- Village
- Country: India
- State: Rajasthan
- District: Balotra district

Government
  - Type: Panchayati Raj
  - Body: Gram Panchayat

Population (2011)
  - Total: 3,270

Languages
  - Official: Hindi; Marwari
- Time zone: UTC+5:30 (IST)
- Nearest city: Jodhpur, Balotra

Budiwada is a village in Pachpadra tehsil of Balotra District of the Indian state of Rajasthan.
