= Chhiyali =

Chhiyali छियाली
- Village
- Country: India
- State: Rajasthan
- District: Balotra
- Tehsil: Siwana

Area
  - Total: 973 ha (2,400 acres)

Population (2011)
  - Total: 1,483
- Time zone: UTC+5:30 (IST)
- PIN: 344043
- ISO 3166 code: RJ-IN

Chhiyali is a village in Balotra district, Rajasthan, India. Chhiyali has a total population of 1483 according to Census 2011.

Chhiyali is located near Sewali Village, and is 20 km (12 mi) from Samdari. Chhiyali is 6 km (3.7 mi) from Kandap.
