= Dheera, Balotra =

Village in Rajasthan, India

- Village
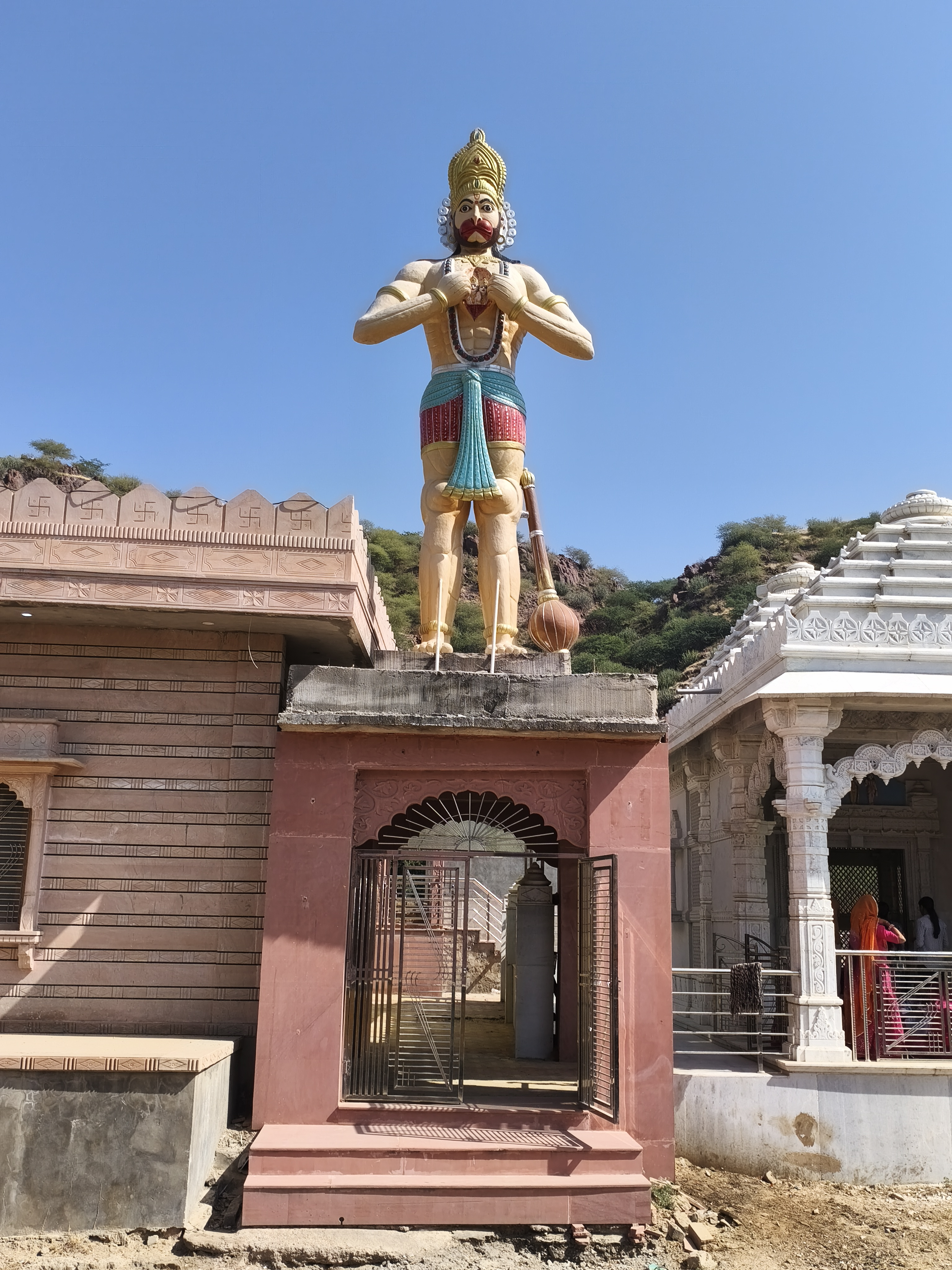
- Bal Veer Hanuman Temple

- Location in Rajasthan, India Dheera, Balotra (India)
- Coordinates: 26°04′02″N 72°26′26″E
- Country: India
- State: Rajasthan
- District: Balotra district

Government
  - Type: Government of Rajasthan
  - Body: Gram Panchayat

Population (2011)
  - Total: 1,409

Languages
  - Official: Hindi; Marwari
- Time zone: UTC+5:30 (IST)
- Nearest city: Balotra

Dheera is a Village in Siwana tehsil of Balotra district in Rajasthan, India. As of the 2011 India census, the total population of the village is 1409.

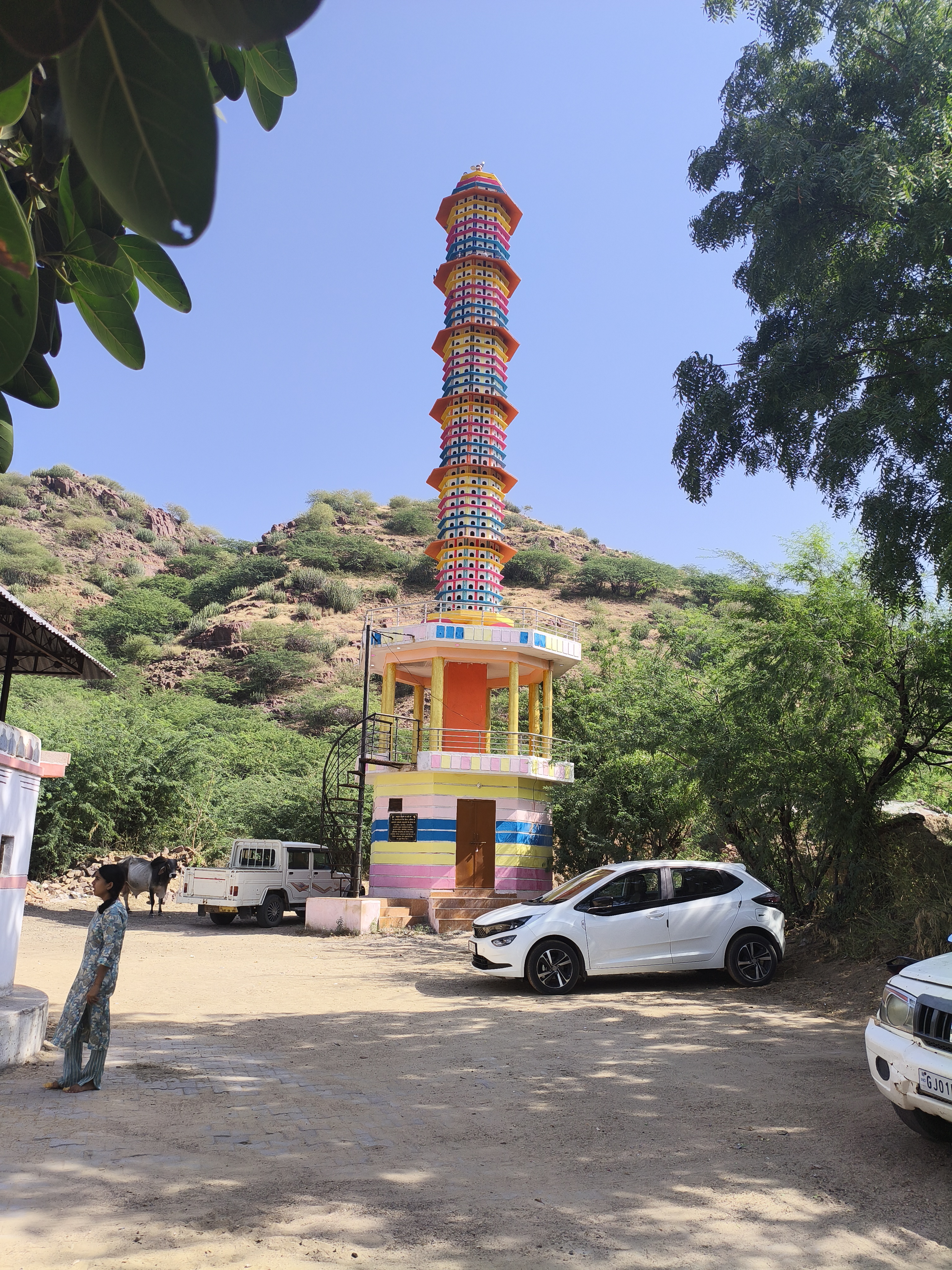
Chidiyaghar At Bal Veer Hanuman Dheera

== Population ==
According to the 2011 census, the village has a total population of 1409 people.

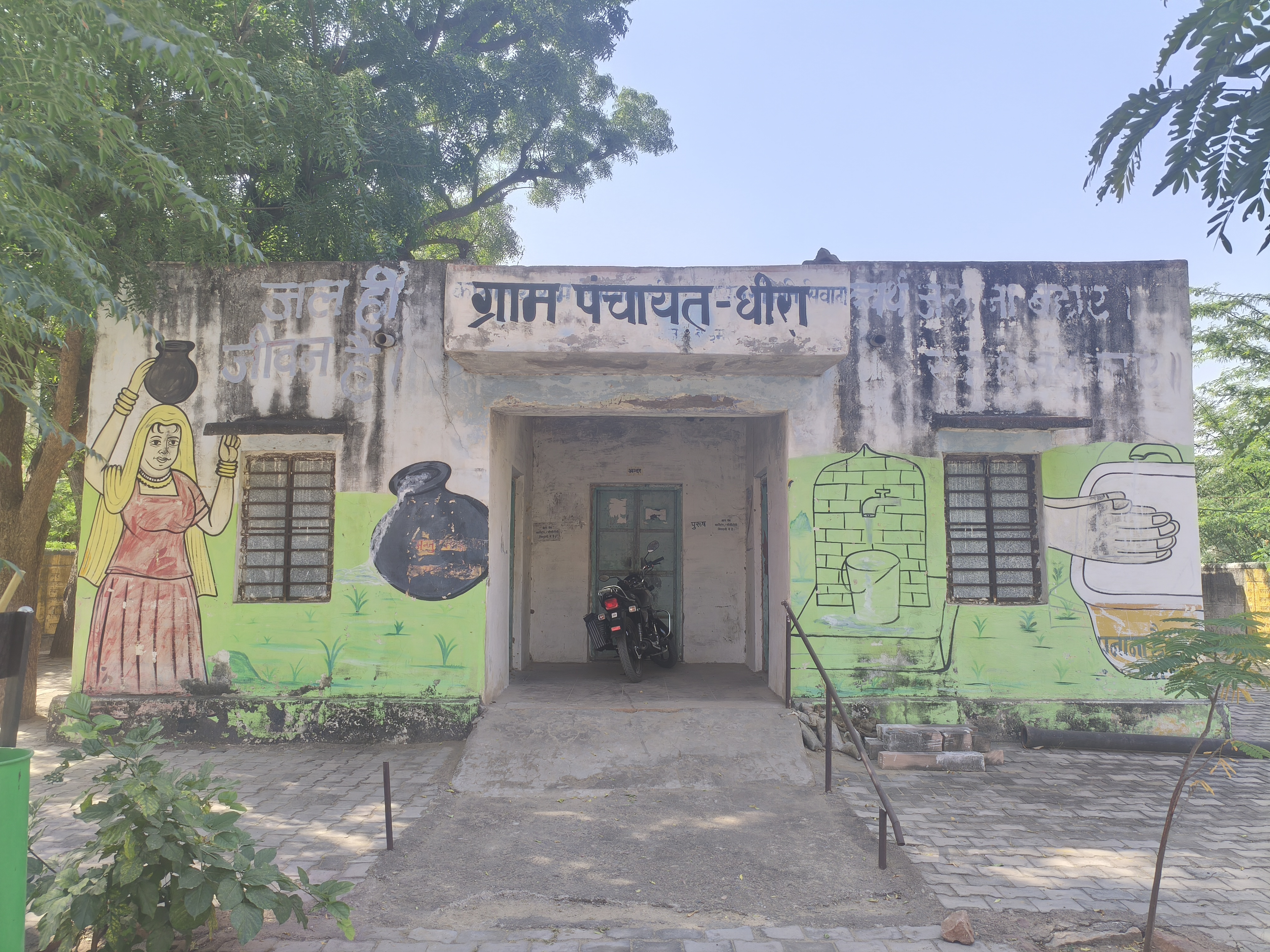
Grampanchayat Dheera

== Gellery ==
- Hanuman temple

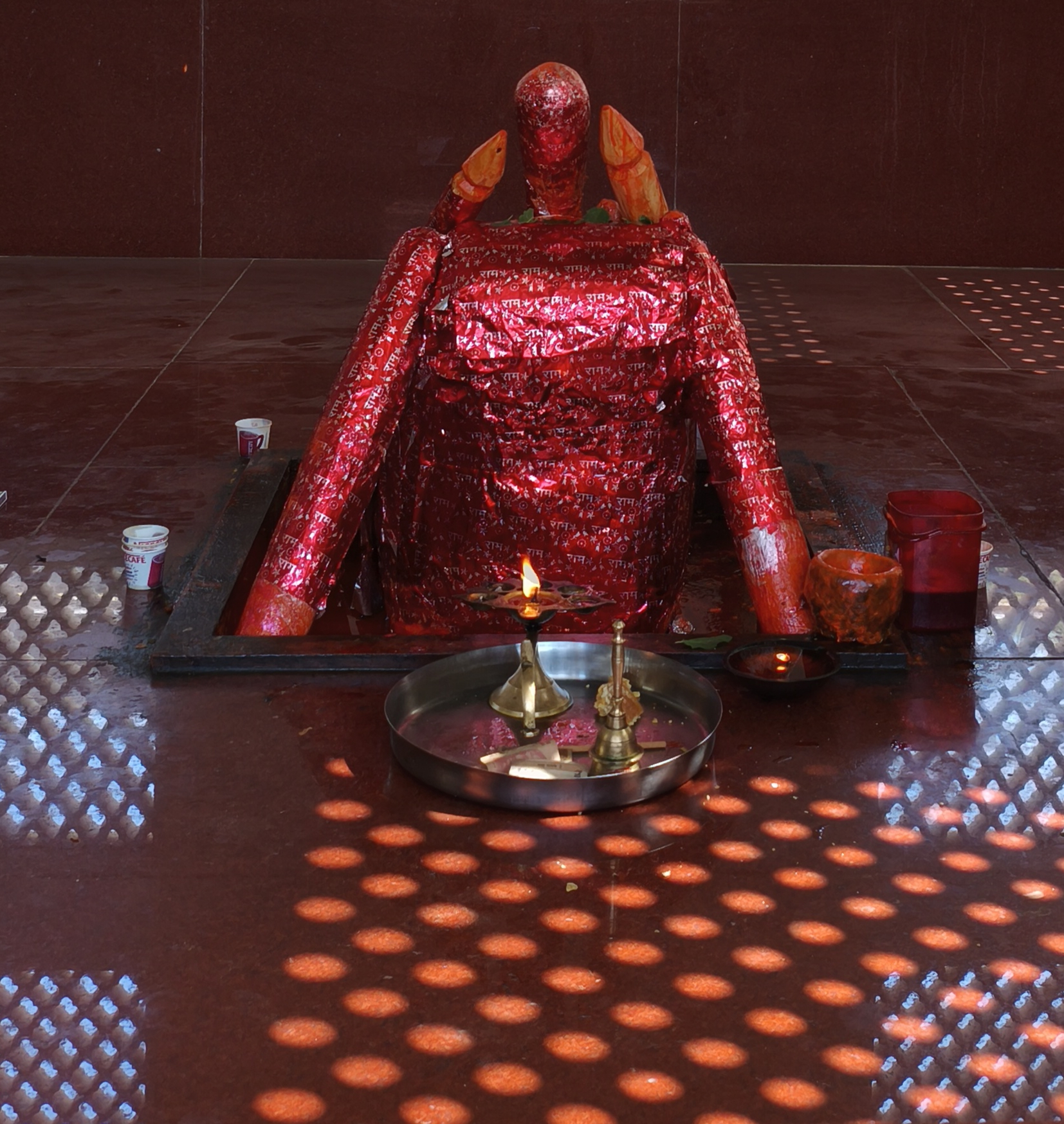
Hanuman temple, Dheera.

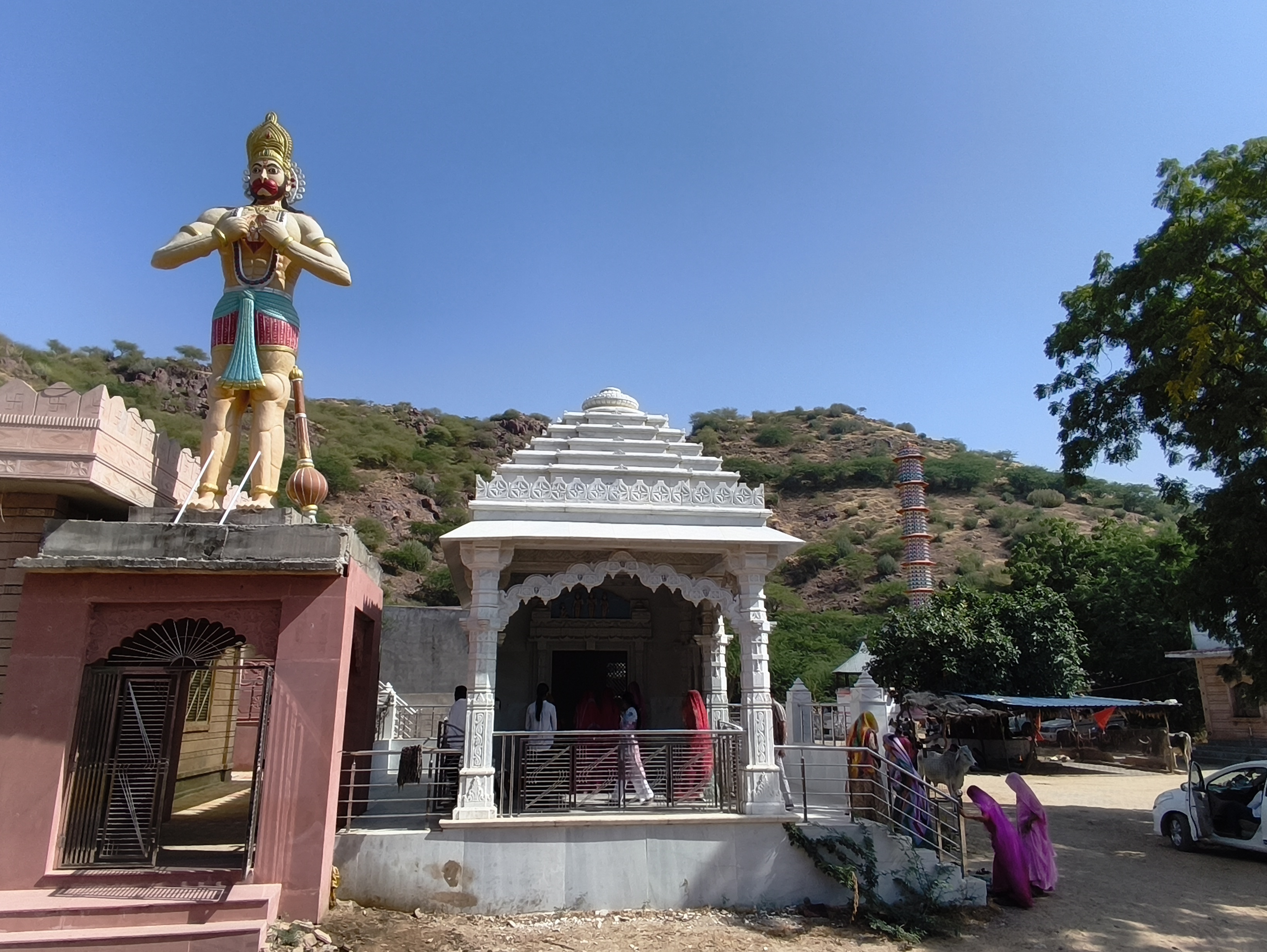
Bal Veer Hanuman Dheera.

- Pari Maa Temple (Maa Beti Mandir)

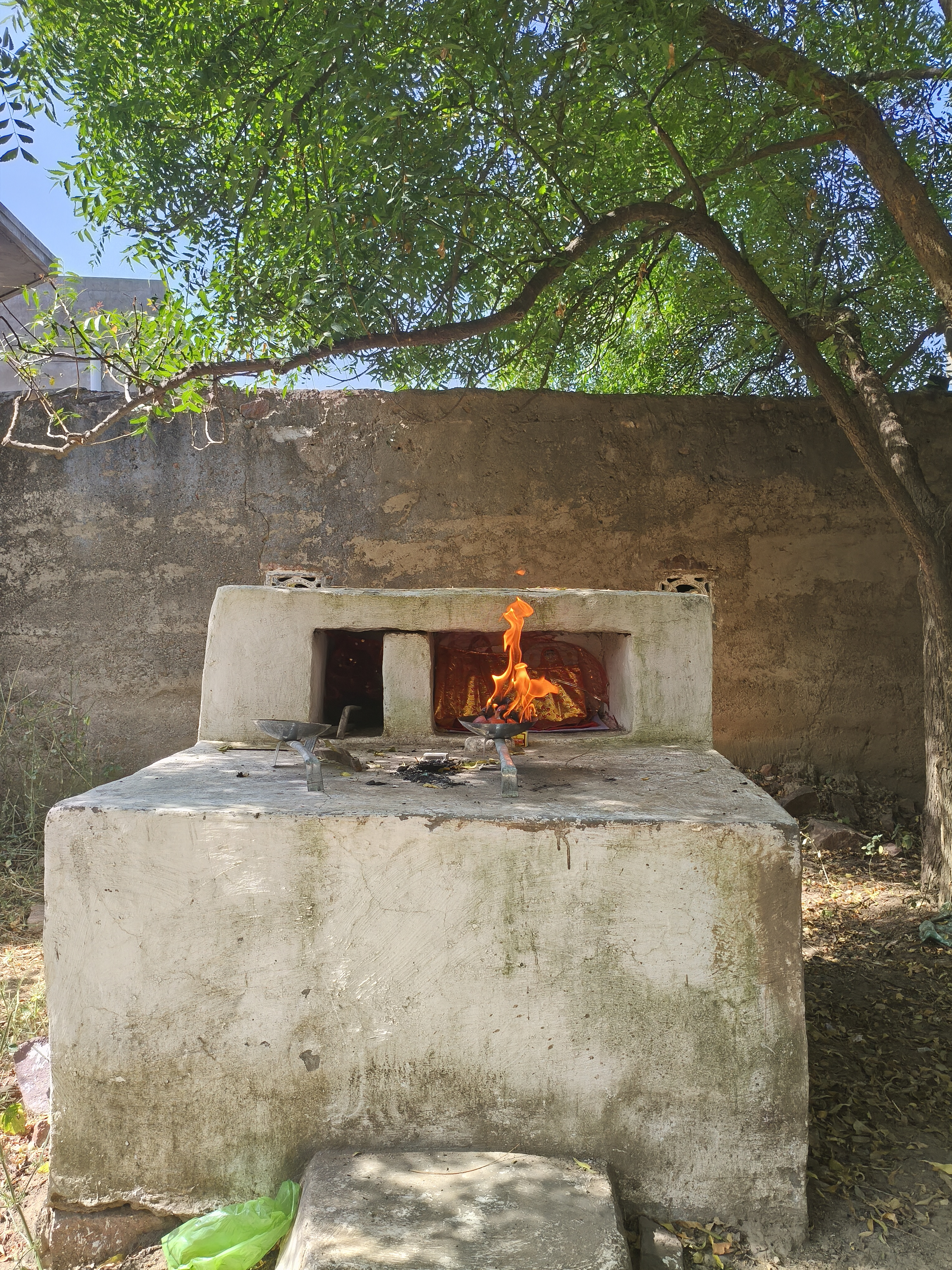
Pari Maa Temple (Maa Beti Mandir)

== Language ==
The official languages of the village are Hindi and Marwari.
