= Rani Bhatiyani =

Hindu goddess

Rani Bhatiyani sa
- Hindu goddess worshipped in Western Rajasthan, India, Kashmir, and Sindh, Pakistan
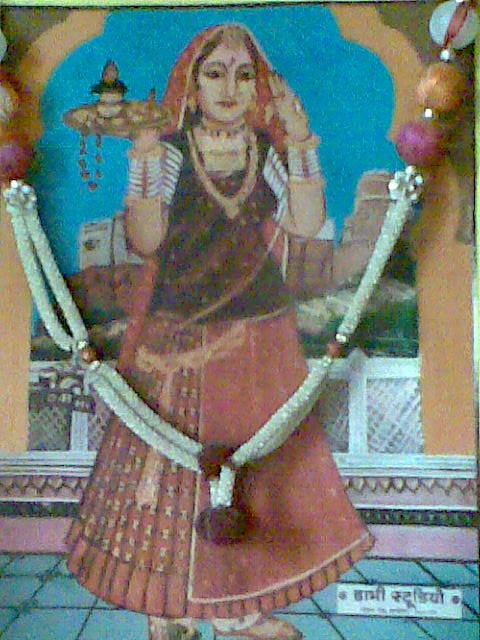
- Other names: Majisa (Mother)
- Gender: Female
- Region: Western Rajasthan, India; Kashmir; Sindh, Pakistan

Genealogy
- Consort: Kalyan Singh
- Children: Lal Singh (son)

Rani Bhatiyani sa is a Hindu goddess, worshipped in Western Rajasthan, India, the region Kashmir, and Sindh, Pakistan. Her major temples are in Jasol, Barmer District and Jogidas, Jaisalmer (birthplace of majisa), where she is called Bhuasa She is especially venerated by the Merasi Manganiyar community of bards. The women of the Dholi (singer) community sing the Ghoomar songs, in her honour, where she is praised as the princess of Jaisalmer. The goddess is said to have given her first vision to a dholi. The goddess is also called Majisa (Mother) and songs are sung in her honour by bards.

Rani Bhatiyani's name is Swarup and was a Rajput princess from a small kingdom Jogidas in Jaisalmer district. She was known as Bhatiyani, as her father Jograj Singhji belonged to the Bhati Rajput clan. She was married to Kalyan Singh, a Rathore prince of Jasol. There are various versions of legends, leading to her death. In one version, Kalyan Singh's jealous first wife Devri poisons Bhatiyani's son Lal Singh. Another legend says that news that her husband was killed in battle reached her, however actually her brother-in-law Sawai Singh was dead. The rumour was spread by her husband to get rid of her and take a second wife. Despite learning that her husband was alive, she stuck to her initial decision to commit sati and jumped in the funeral pyre of her brother-in-law and gave up her life. Trouble befell Kalyan Singh's family due to Bhatiyani's death and a shrine was devoted to her in Jasol to placate her spirit; after which she is said to have transformed into a benevolent spirit.

In 2020, a Hindu temple dedicated to Rani Bhatiyani in Tharparkar district in Pakistan was vandalised by miscreants. They vandalised the idol of Rani Bhatiyani and set fire to holy books.
