= Manpura Kharda =

Village in Rajasthan, India

- Village
- Country: India
- State: Rajasthan
- District: Balotra district

Government
  - Type: Democratic
  - Body: Tehsil

Population (2011)
  - Total: 1,013

Languages
  - Official: Hindi/Marwadi
- Time zone: UTC+5:30 (IST)
- Nearest city: Jodhpur, Balotra

Manpura Kharda village located in Baytoo tehsil of Balotra district in Rajasthan, India. As of the 2011 India census, the total population of the village is 1013.
