= Tilwara =

Village in India

Coordinates: 25°52′N 72°05′E

Tilwara (तिलवाड़ा)
- Village
- Interactive map of Tilwara (तिलवाड़ा)
- Country: India
- State: Rajasthan
- District: Barmer
- Tehsil: Pachpadra

Area
  - Total: 3,780 ha (9,300 acres)

Population (2011)
  - Total: 1,487
- Time zone: UTC+5:30 (IST)
- PIN: 344022
- ISO 3166 code: RJ-IN

Tilwara, historically known as Khedgarh is a village in Pachpadra tehsil of Balotra district of Rajasthan state in India. Tilwara is situated on the Luni River and is a railway station on Jodhpur-Balotra route. The village is famous for Mallinath Fair, which is the most ancient animal fair of Rajasthan, held between eleventh of Krishna paksh to eleventh of Shukla paksh of Chaitra month of Hindu calendar every year. Also called Tilwara cattle fair, it lasts for two weeks. Tilwara is also an archeological site from where evidence for the Mesolithic culture have been excavated. Tilwara has a total population of 1,487 peoples according to Census 2011.
