= Samdari =

- City
- Location in Rajasthan, India Samdari (India)
- Coordinates: 25°49′0″N 72°34′59″E
- Country: India
- State: Rajasthan
- District: Balotra district

Government
  - Type: Democratic
  - Body: Tehsil
- Elevation: 134 m (440 ft)

Population (2011)
  - Total: 25,012

Languages
  - Official: Hindi, Marwadi
- Time zone: UTC+5:30 (IST)
- Vehicle registration: Rj 39
- Nearest city: Jodhpur, Balotra

Samdari is a city and tehsil headquarters in Balotra District in Rajasthan, northern India.

== Demographics ==
According to the Indian Census 2011, the population of Samdari is 22222, where male population is 12805 and female population is 12207.

== Notable people ==
- Goparam Meghwal, Member of the Legislative Assembly
- Lucky Gupta,Internet personality

== See also ==
- Dheedhas
- Samdari Junction railway station
- Balotra
