= Moothali =

Moothali (मूठली)
- Village
- Country: India
- State: Rajasthan
- District: Barmer

Area
  - Total: 1,518 ha (3,750 acres)

Population (2011)
  - Total: 2,976
- Time zone: UTC+5:30 (IST)
- PIN: 344044
- ISO 3166 code: RJ-IN

Moothali is a village in the suburb of Siwana, Balotra District, India. Rajput, Rajpurohit, Nai, Suthar, Jain, Meghwal (name of the castes) and many other castes live in this village. According to Census 2011 information the location code or village code of Moothali village is 087522.

Moothali village is located in Siwana Tehsil of Barmer district in Rajasthan, India. It is situated 20 km away from sub-district headquarter Siwana and 120 km away from district headquarter Barmer. As per 2009 stats, Moothali village is also a gram panchayat.

The total geographical area of village is 1518 hectares. Moothali has a total population of 2,976 people. There are about 507 houses in Moothali village. Balotra is nearest town to Moothali which is approximately 15 km away Map of moothali
