= Gida, Rajasthan =

Gira
- Village
- Location in Rajasthan, India Gira (India)
- Coordinates: 25°52′59″N 71°46′0″E
- Country: India
- State: Rajasthan
- District: Balotra

Government
  - Body: Gram Panchayat

Area
  - Total: 756.3 ha (1,869 acres)
- Elevation: 164 m (538 ft)

Population (2011)
  - Total: 803
  - Density: 106/km^{2} (275/sq mi)

Languages
  - Official: Hindi
  - Local: Rajasthani • Marwadi
- Time zone: UTC+5:30 (IST)
- PIN: 344037
- ISO 3166 code: RJ-IN
- Vehicle registration: RJ-04
- Nearest city: Balotra
- Lok Sabha constituency: Barmer(Lok Sabha constituency)
- Civic agency: Tehsil

Gida is a village and tehsil headquarters of Gida tehsil in Balotra District of Rajasthan State, India. It belongs to Jodhpur Division. Gira has a total population of 803 peoples according to Census 2011.
