= Sindhari =

- Tehsil and block
- Country: India
- State: Rajasthan
- District: Balotra district

Government
  - Type: Democratic
  - Body: Tehsil

Population (2011)
  - Total: 33,012

Languages
  - Official: Hindi/Marwadi
- Time zone: UTC+5:30 (IST)
- Postal code: 344033
- Nearest city: Jodhpur, Balotra

Sindhari is a tehsil in Balotra District of Rajasthan.
