= Goparam Meghwal =

Indian politician

MLA
- In office 1998 - 2003
- Constituency: Siwana

Personal details
- Party: Indian National Congress

Goparam Meghwal as an Indian politician from Samdari. He is a former Member of Legislative Assembly from Siwana constituency Rajasthan. leader of Indian National Congress.
