= Balotra railway station =

Railway station in Rajasthan, India

Balotra
- Railway Station

General information
- Location: Balotra, Balotra district, Rajasthan; India
- Coordinates: 25.829939°N 72.247310°E
- System: Indian Railways station
- Owner: Indian Railways
- Operator: North Western Railway
- Line: Marwar Junction–Munabao line
- Platforms: 2
- Tracks: 2

Construction
- Structure type: Standard (on ground station)
- Parking: Yes

Other information
- Status: Functioning
- Station code: BLT
- Zone(s): North Western Railway
- Division(s): Jodhpur
Location
- Location within India Location within Rajasthan

Balotra railway station is a railway station in Balotra district, Rajasthan. Its code is BLT. It serves Balotra city. The station consists of 2 platforms. Passenger, Express, and Superfast trains halt here. As of 2021, the station has no train shed

== Trains ==
The following trains halt at Balotra in both directions:

- Yesvantpur–Barmer AC Express
- Malani Express
- Kalka–Barmer Express
- Barmer–Guwahati Express
- Barmar–Rishikesh Express
- 12997/98 Bandra Terminus - Barmer Humsafar Express
- 21901/02 Bandra Terminus - Barmer Humsafar Express
