= Jogidas Ka Gaon =

Village in Rajasthan, India

Jogidas Ka Gaon is a small village of 4659 hectares in Fatehgarh Tehsil in Jaisalmer district, nicknamed The Golden city, in the State of Rajasthan, India.
