= Balotra district =

- District
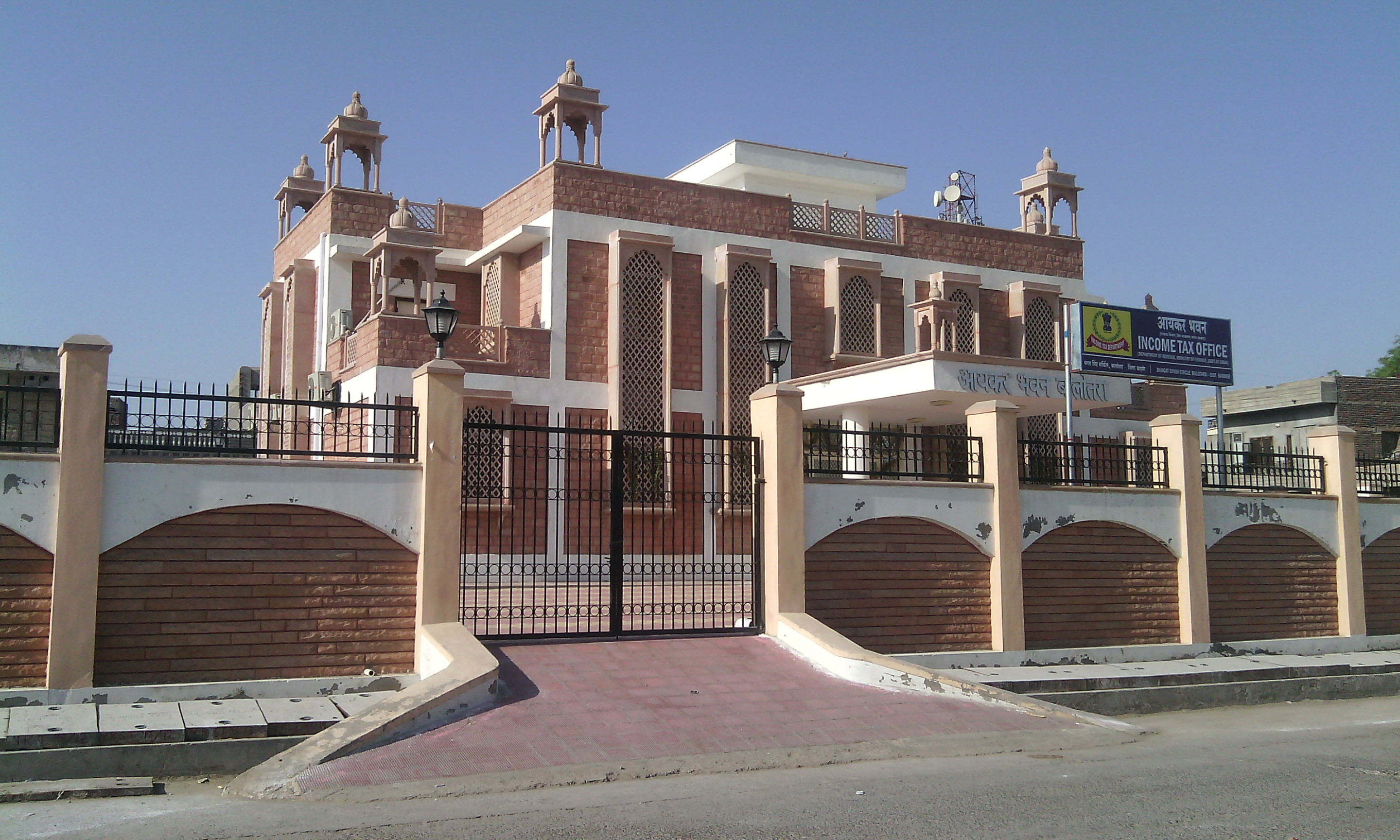
- Income Tax Office, Balotra

- Location of Balotra district in Rajasthan
- Country: India
- State: Rajasthan
- Division: Jodhpur
- Headquarters: Balotra, Rajasthan
- Tehsils: Balotra district has 9 tehsils: Pachpadra, Siwana, Sindhari, Samdari,Dhorimanna,Gudamalani, Patodi,Kalyanpur and Gira.

Area
  - Total: 10,551 km^{2} (4,074 sq mi)

Population (2011)
  - Total: 970,760
  - Density: 92.006/km^{2} (238.30/sq mi)

Demographics
- Time zone: UTC+05:30 (IST)
- Website: balotra.rajasthan.gov.in

Balotra district is a district of Rajasthan state of India. This district came into existence on 7 August 2023 by separating from Barmer district.

Balotra's district headquarters is Balotra town. Balotra district is bordered by Jaisalmer district in the north, Jodhpur Rural district in the east, Pali, Jalore district in the south and Barmer district in the west. The area of Balotra district is 10,551 sq km. The total population of Balotra district is 9,70,760.

== Villages ==
- Tapra
- Parlu
- Budiwada
- Jethantari
- MOOTHALI BALOTRA
- Padru, Balotra
- Dandali
- Kanana, Balotra
- Nagana, Balotra
- Majivala
- Nalgudha, Rajasthan
- Tirsingri Sodha
- Sarawadi Purohitan
- Dheera, Balotra
- Manpura Kharda

== People and Culture ==
Mallinath cattle fair - It takes place every year during the month of April. The fair takes place in Tilwara, an area also known for archaeological discoveries, and goes on for two weeks. This fair is one of the biggest cattle fair of India.

== Tourist Attractions ==
- Siwana Fort

Siwana Fort is located approximately 35 kilometers from Balotra district in Rajasthan, India. The fort was constructed in the 10th century by Veer Narayan Parmar, the son of King Bhoj. It is a significant historical site, showcasing architectural elements from the period of its construction.

- Bhimgoda Tirth

Bhimgoda Tirth is a revered pilgrimage site with historical ties to the Mahabharata era. According to legend, Bhima of the Pandavas struck the ground with his knee to produce water at this location. The site also holds significance due to the meditation of Māncharam. Under the guidance of Abhayram Maharaj, the temple at Bhimgoda Tirth gained prestige, further establishing it as a sacred place of worship. The site is also known for the famous Gangaur Mela, an annual festival. One of the notable features of Bhimgoda Tirth is the continuous flow of sweet water from the surrounding hills, which occurs throughout the year.

- Peepalun Village and Chhappan Hills

Peepalun village, situated at the base of Siwana, is known for its Chhappan Hills. During the Sawan (monsoon) season, and particularly during the rainy months, the area becomes a popular destination for devotees who visit the temple located in the region. The temple can be accessed by traversing a route that passes through seven hills. The site is a significant pilgrimage destination, attracting visitors during the monsoon period.

=== Temples of Balotra and Surrounding Regions ===
Balotra district is home to several significant temples, each with historical and religious importance. These temples attract millions of devotees annually, contributing to the area's cultural and spiritual significance. Below are some of the major temples in and around Balotra:

- Nakoda Jain Pilgrimage

Located approximately 13 kilometers from Balotra, the Nakoda Jain Temple is a prominent Jain pilgrimage site. It houses temples dedicated to Lord Parshwanath and Bhairuji and is considered one of the largest pilgrimage destinations among Jain followers. The temple is renowned for its intricate artwork and serves as a major center for Jain religious practices, drawing millions of devotees every year.

- Brahma Temple, Asotra

Brahmdham Asotra, located in the vicinity of Balotra, is a temple of the Rajpurohit community. The temple was established by the community's guru, Khetaram Ji, and is dedicated to Lord Brahma. It is the third temple in India dedicated to Lord Brahma, adding to the religious and cultural heritage of the region.

- Rani Bhatiyani Temple

Situated around 5 kilometers from Balotra, the Jasol Dham is home to the Mata Rani Bhatiyani Temple. The temple holds significant religious importance, especially on the thirteenth day of the Bhadrapad month when millions of devotees visit for darshan. The temple remains a center of faith and devotion for the followers of Mata Rani Bhatiyani.

- Bithuja Temple

Located approximately 6 kilometers from Balotra, the Bithuja Temple is closely associated with Baba Ramdev Ji, who is believed to have rested here. Often referred to as "Mini Ramdevra," the temple draws millions of devotees annually who visit to pay homage to Baba Ramdev Ji, a prominent folk deity of Rajasthan.

- Nagnechi Mata Temple

The Nagnechi Mata Temple is situated 35 kilometers from Balotra and holds great significance as the Kuldevi (clan goddess) of the Rathores. Devotees visit the temple to seek blessings, and it remains an essential site for the Rathore community.

- Rani Rupade Mata Temple

Located 12 kilometers from Balotra, the Rani Rupade Mata Temple has undergone significant renovations, giving it a new appearance. The temple is deeply revered by millions of devotees who have faith in the deity. Adjacent to the Rani Rupade Mata Temple is a temple and memorial dedicated to Mallinath Ji, a folk deity. A large cattle fair is held here every year from Chaitra Krishna Ekadashi to Chaitra Shukla Ekadashi, further emphasizing the religious and cultural importance of the site.

== See also ==
- Balotra
- Balotra Railway Station
