= Pachpadra =

- Town
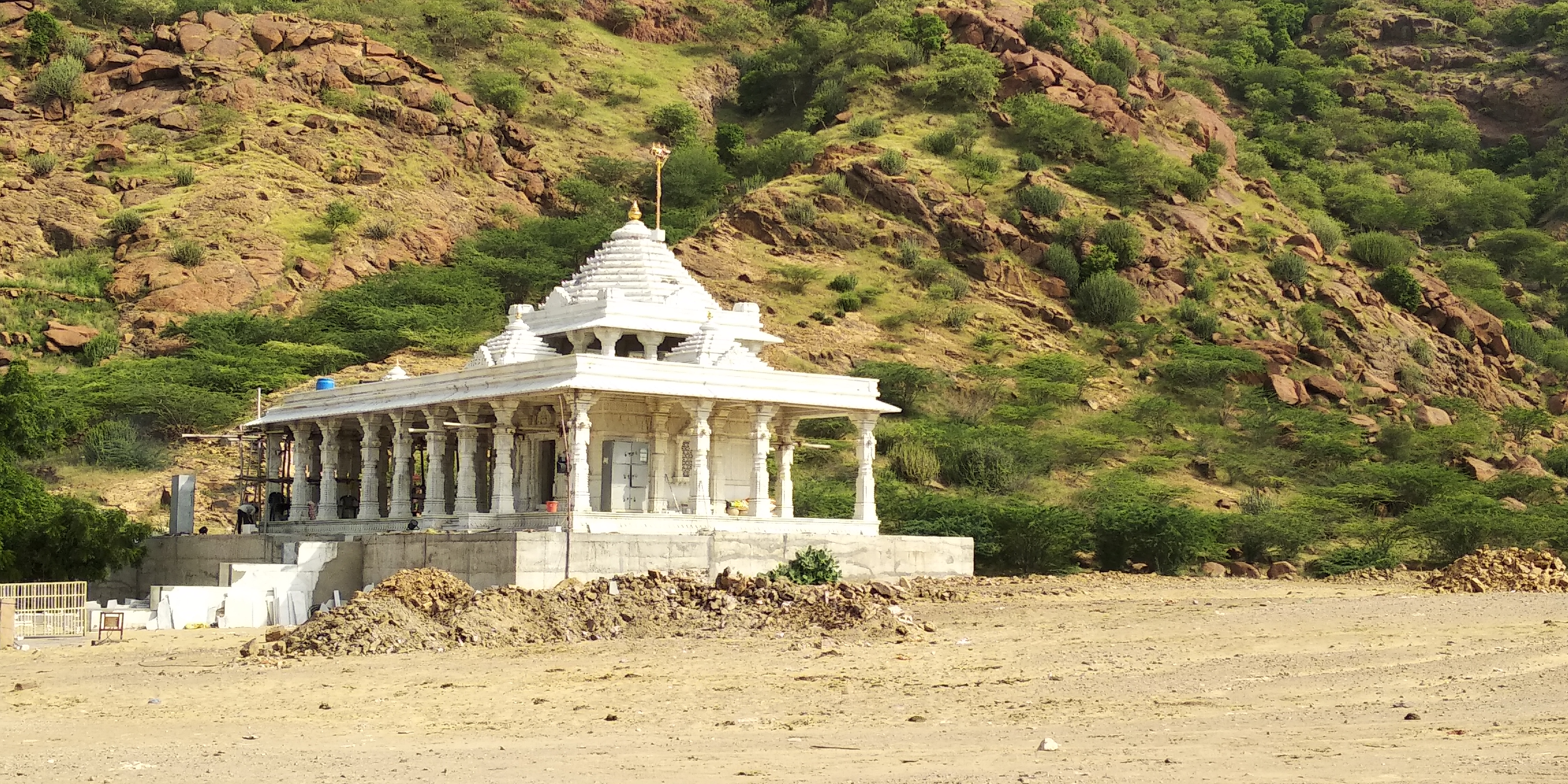
- Jain temple in Pachpadra (Balotra district, Rajasthan)

- Location in Rajasthan, India Pachpadra (India)
- Coordinates: 25°55′0″N 72°16′0″E
- Country: India
- State: Rajasthan
- District: Balotra

Government
  - Body: Gram Panchayat
- Elevation: 102 m (335 ft)

Population
  - Total: 8,481

Languages
  - Official: Hindi, Rajasthani • Marwadi
- Time zone: UTC+5:30 (IST)
- PIN: 344032
- Telephone code: 091-2988
- ISO 3166 code: RJ-IN
- Vehicle registration: RJ-39
- Nearest city: Balotra
- Lok Sabha constituency: Balotra (Lok Sabha constituency)
- Vidhan Sabha constituency: Pachpadra
- Civic agency: Gram Panchayat

HPCL Rajasthan Refinery and Petrochemical Complex, Pachpadra

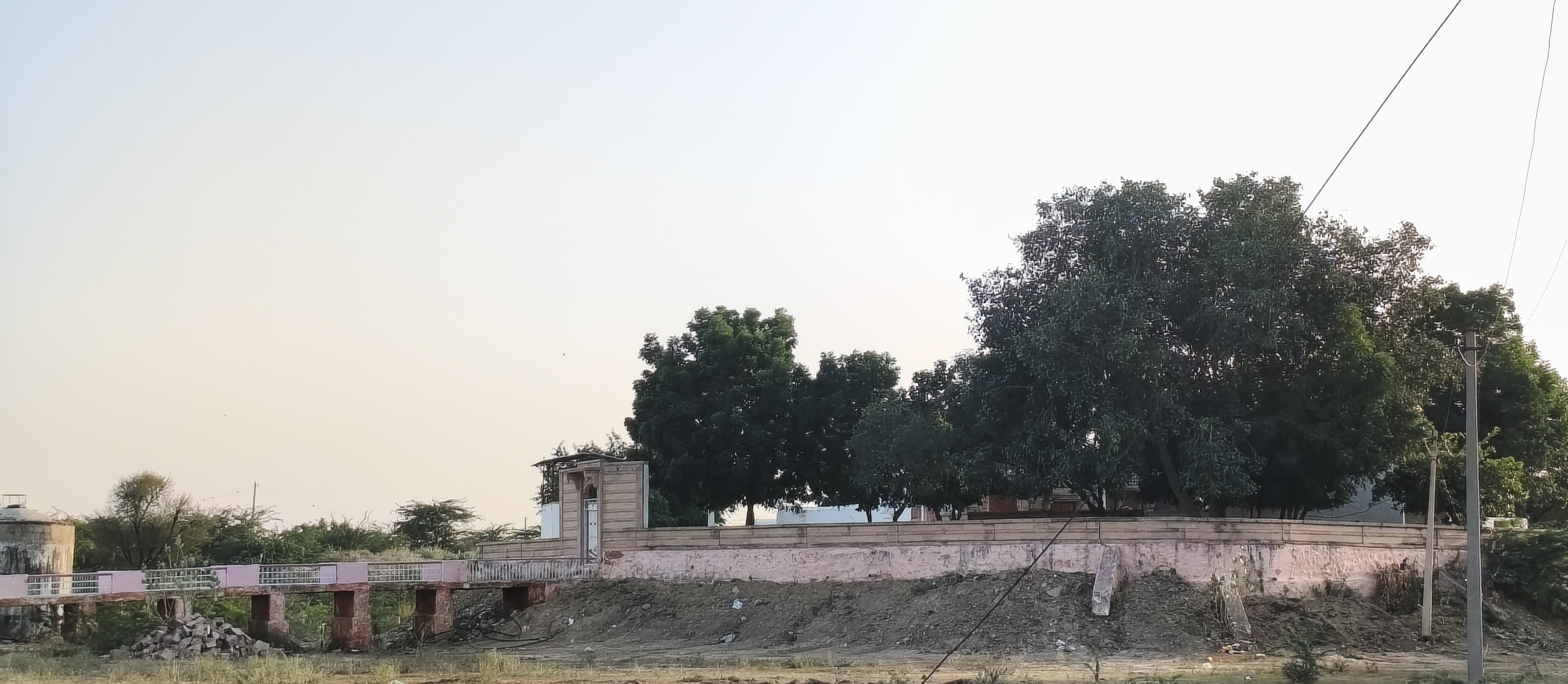
Chidhani Dham Pachpadra

Pachpadra is a small town, just 11 km from Balotra city in Balotra district in Indian state of Rajasthan. It is a tehsil headquarter. The nearest railway station of Pachpadra is Balotra railway station.

One of the famous attractions in the city is the Pachpadra Lake, which is known for salt collection around it. There is one Jawahar Navodaya Vidyalaya also, which will be only one in a district.

The HPCL Rajasthan Refinery, a 9-million-tonne-per-annum (MMTPA) integrated refinery-cum-petrochemical complex, is located near Pachpadra. Developed as a joint venture between Hindustan Petroleum (74%) and the Government of Rajasthan (26%), the facility has a petrochemical production capacity of 2.4 MMTPA and was commissioned in July 2026.

== Demographics ==
Population of Pachpadra according to the Indian census 2011 is 9191, male population is 4736 and female population is 4455 .
