= Balotra =

- City
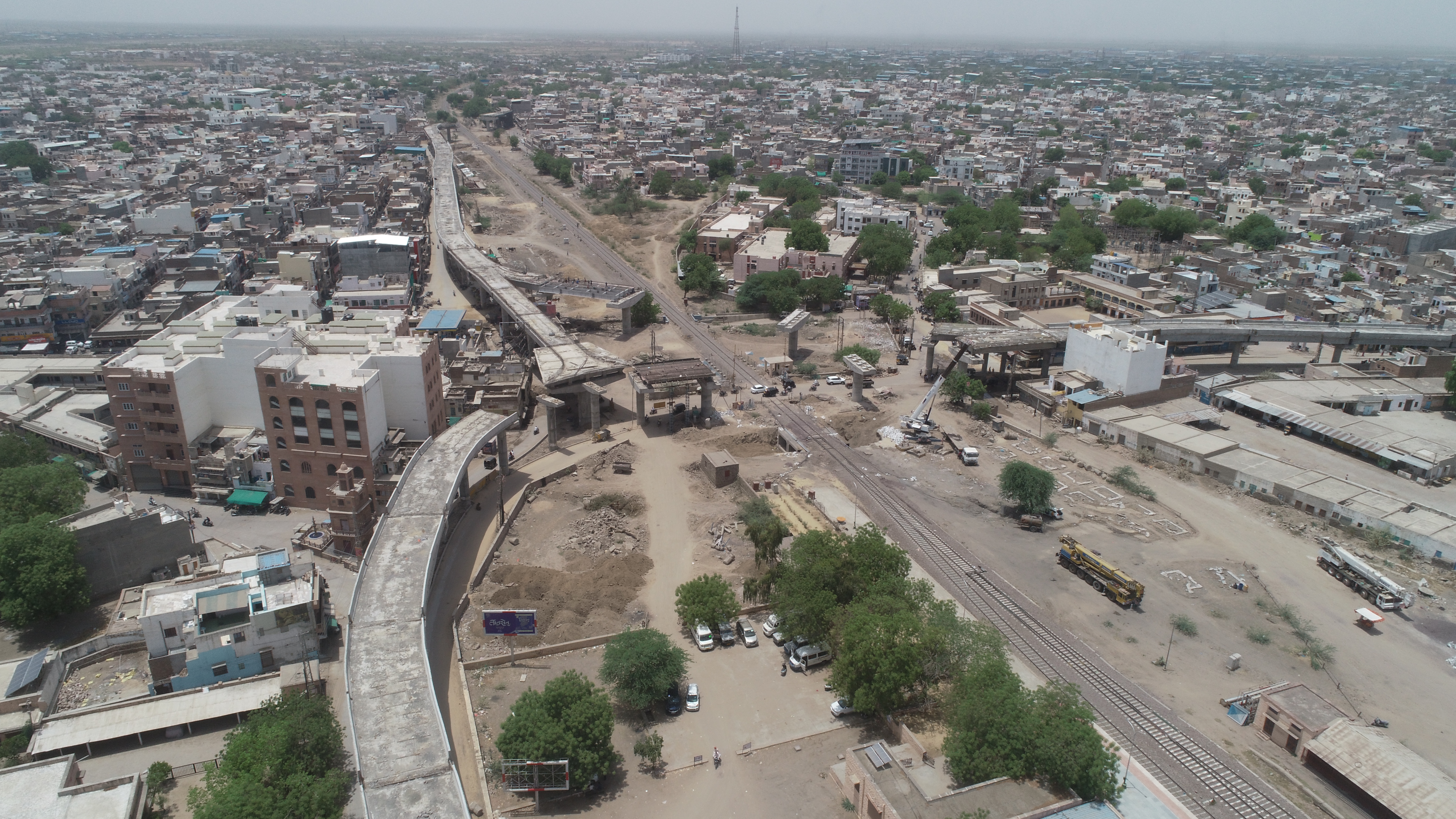
- Drone view of Balotra city

- Location in Rajasthan, India
- Coordinates: 25.83°N 72.23°E
- Country: India
- State: Rajasthan
- District: Balotra

Government
  - Type: Municipal Council
  - Body: Balotra Municipal Council
- Elevation: 106 m (348 ft)

Population (2011)
  - City: 74,496
  - Metro: 425,362

Languages
  - Official: Hindi, Rajasthani
- Time zone: UTC+5:30 (IST)
- PIN: 344022
- Telephone code: 02988
- ISO 3166 code: RJ-IN
- Vehicle registration: RJ-39

Balotra is a city situated in the Balotra district within the state of Rajasthan, India. Previously, it was located in the Barmer district of the Indian state of Rajasthan.

== Geography ==
Balotra is located at 25.83°N 72.23°E. It has an average elevation of 106 metres (347 feet).

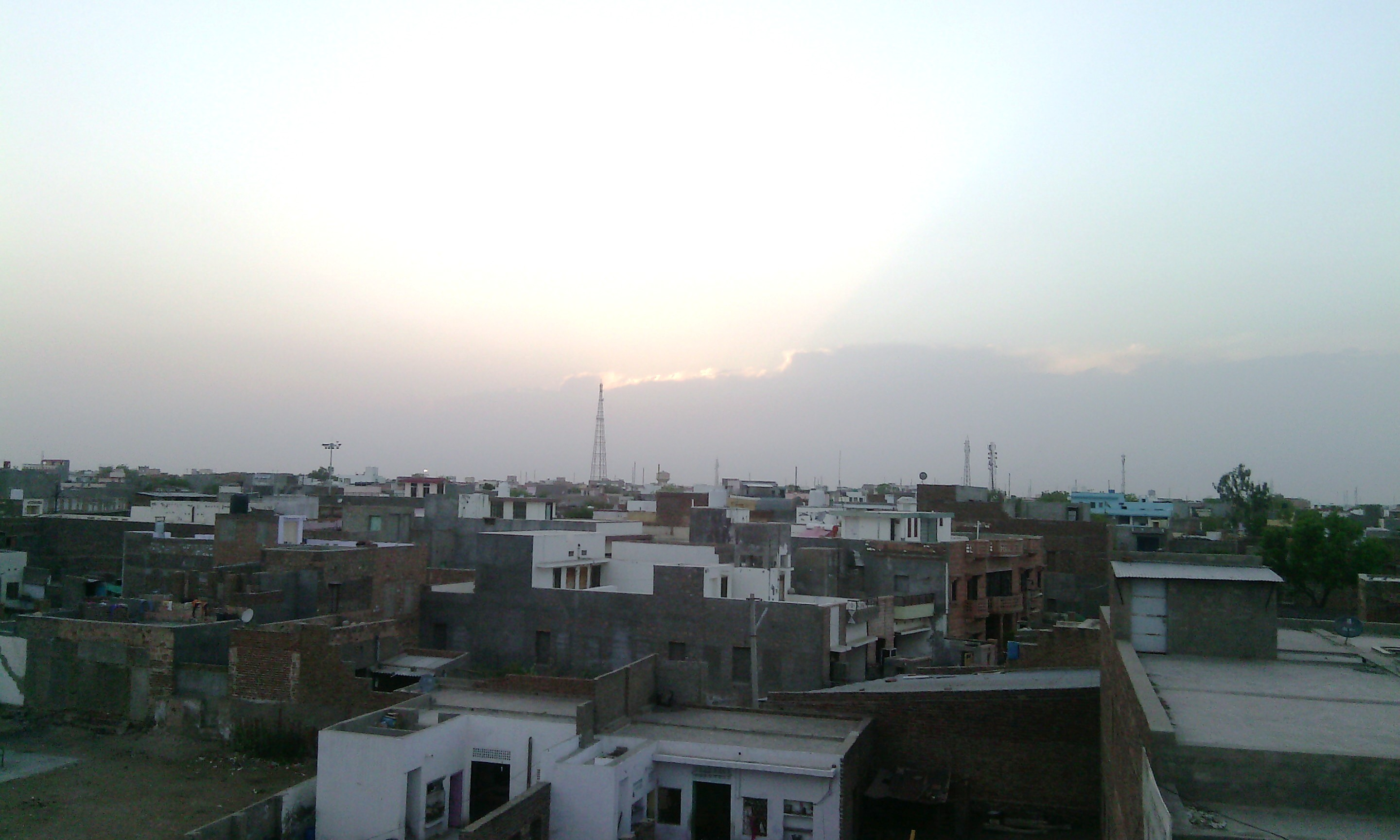
A view of the city in the direction of the Balotra industrial area

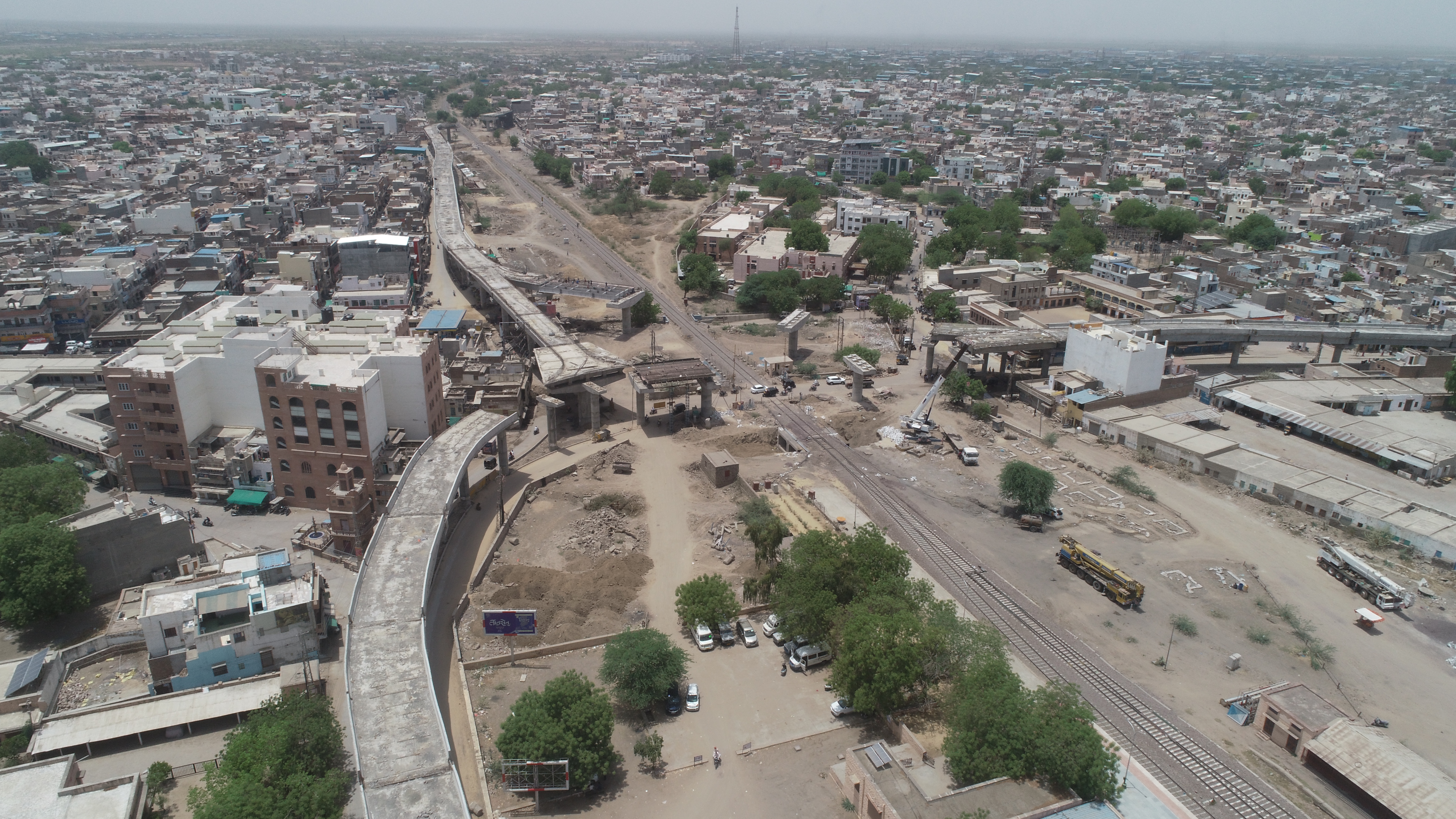
A complete view of Balotra

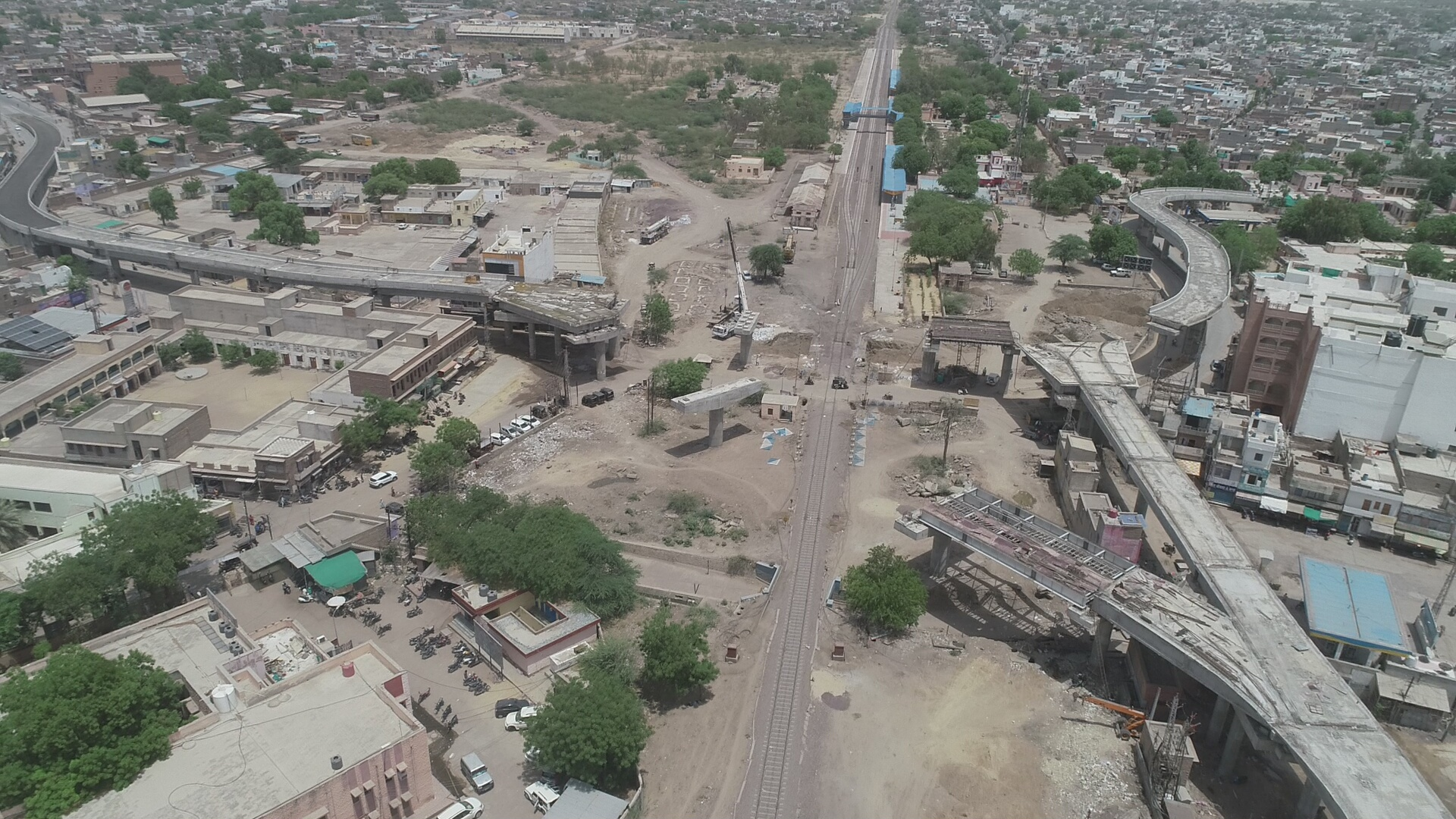
Drone view of under-construction bridge in Balotra

== Demographics ==
As of 2011 India census, Balotra city has population of 74496 of which 38715 are males and 35781 are females. The population of children between age 0-6 is 10984 which is 14.74% of total population.

The sex-ratio of Balotra city is around 924 compared to 928 which is average of Rajasthan state. The literacy rate of Balotra city is 64.39% out of which 73.26% males are literate and 54.78% females are literate. There are 14.2% Scheduled Caste (SC) and 3.37% Scheduled Tribe (ST) of total population in Balotra city.

== Means of transport ==
=== Railway ===
Balotra railway station

Balotra is connected to other cities like Jodhpur, Jaipur and Chandigarh.

=== Bus service ===
Balotra has both private and RSRTC Bus services for various cities of India.

== See also ==
- Balotra District
- Balotra Railway Station
