= Harish Chaudhary =

Indian politician

AICC In Charge, Madhya Pradesh Congress Committee
- Incumbent
- Assumed office 14 February 2025
- Preceded by: Bhanwar Jitendra Singh

Cabinet Minister Government of Rajasthan
- In office 24 December 2018 – 20 November 2021
- Chief Minister: Ashok Gehlot
- Preceded by: Amra Ram Choudhary
- Succeeded by: Ramlal Jat

Member of the Rajasthan Legislative Assembly
- Incumbent
- Assumed office 11 December 2018
- Chief Minister: Ashok Gehlot
- Preceded by: Kailash Choudhary
- Constituency: Baytoo, Rajasthan

National Secretary of the All India Congress Committee & Incharge Punjab
- In office 2013 - 2019

Member of Parliament for Barmer, Rajasthan
- In office 2009–2014
- Prime Minister: Manmohan Singh
- Preceded by: Manvendra Singh
- Succeeded by: Sona Ram

Student Union President Jai Narain Vyas University
- In office 1991-92
- Student Wing: NSUI
- Succeeded by: Gajendra Singh Shekhawat
- Succeeded by: Gajendra Singh Shekhawat

Personal details
- Born: Barmer, Rajasthan, India
- Party: Indian National Congress
- Spouse: Hemani Choudhary
- Education: Jai Narain Vyas University
- Occupation: Politician

Harish Chaudhary is an Indian politician. He is member of the Rajasthan Legislative Assembly from Baytoo, Rajasthan. He is member of the Indian National Congress. He also served as the Cabinet Minister of Revenue, Colonization and Water Cooperation of Rajasthan. He was elected to the Lok Sabha from Barmer in 2009. He was national secretary of the All India Congress Committee from 2014 to 2019. He was also incharge of the Congress party in Punjab.

== Early life and education ==
Chaudhary was born on 13 May 1970 in Baytu tehsil in Barmer district of Rajasthan.
