= Siwana Assembly constituency =

Legislative Assembly constituency in Rajasthan State, India

Coordinates: 25.65°N 72.42°E

Siwana
- Constituency No. 138 for the Rajasthan Legislative Assembly

Constituency details
- Country: India
- Region: North India
- State: Rajasthan
- District: Barmer
- Lok Sabha constituency: Barmer
- Established: 1972
- Total electors: 276,251
- Reservation: None

Member of Legislative Assembly
- 16th Rajasthan Legislative Assembly
- Incumbent Hameer Singh Bhayal
- Party: Bharatiya Janata Party
- Elected year: 2023

Siwana Assembly constituency is one of the 200 Legislative Assembly constituencies of Rajasthan state in India. It is in Barmer district.

== Members of the Legislative Assembly ==
Election	Name	Party
2003	Teekam Chand Kant	Independent
2008	Kansingh	Bharatiya Janata Party
2013	Hameer Singh Bhayal	Bharatiya Janata Party
2018	Hameer Singh Bhayal	Bharatiya Janata Party
2023	Hameer Singh Bhayal	Bharatiya Janata Party

=== 2023 ===
2023 Rajasthan Legislative Assembly election: Siwana
Party	Candidate	Votes	%	±%
INC	Manvendra Singh Jasol	44,115	24.69	
RLP	Mahendra Kumar	7,486	4.19	
BJP	Hameer Singh Bhayal	62,875	35.18	
Independent	Sunil Parihar	51068	28.58	
NOTA	None of the Above	2260	1.26	
Independent	Manghu Singh	3247	1.82	
Majority		11807	6.60	
Turnout		178703	95.72	

== Election results ==
=== 2023 ===
2023 Rajasthan Legislative Assembly election: Siwana
Party	Candidate	Votes	%	±%
BJP	Hameer Singh Bhayal	62,875	35.18	+3.45
Independent	Sunil Parihar	51,068	28.58	
INC	Manvendra Singh	44,115	24.69	+12.07
RLP	Mahendra Kumar	7,486	4.19	−7.79
Independent	Mangusingh	3,248	1.82	
BSP	Sujaram	2,133	1.19	−0.45
Independent	Hanjari Mal	2,130	1.19	
NOTA	None of the above	2,260	1.26	+0.75
Majority		11,807	6.6	+6.0
Turnout		178,703	64.69	−1.1
BJP hold		Swing		

=== 2018 ===
Rajasthan Legislative Assembly Election, 2018: Siwana
Party	Candidate	Votes	%	±%
BJP	Hameer Singh Bhayal	50,657	31.73	
Independent	Balaram	49,700	31.13	
INC	Pankaj Pratap Singh	20,145	12.62	
RLP	Sataram	19,124	11.98	
Independent	Sheitan Singh	2,806	1.76	
BSP	Sujaram	2,625	1.64	
SS	Kishan Lal	2,555	1.6	
AAP	Jabara Ram Prajapat	2,045	1.28	
Independent	Prakash	1,985	1.24	
BMP	Moti Ram Meghwal	1,566	0.98	
Independent	Kantilal	1,513	0.95	
NOTA	None of the above	816	0.51	
Majority		957	0.6	
Turnout		159,647	65.79	

== See also ==
- List of constituencies of the Rajasthan Legislative Assembly
- Barmer district
