= Vidya Subrahmaniam =

Vidya Subrahmaniam is an Indian journalist and political commentator. After having served as the Associate Editor at The Hindu, she was a Senior Fellow at The Hindu Centre for Politics and Public Policy. She is now a political commentator for Qatar-based AlJazeera.

== Career ==
Vidya Subrahmaniam received an M. A. degree from the Delhi School of Economics. Her journalistic career started with the Indian Express in 1981 as a City reporter based in Chennai, and later Mumbai and Delhi. She also acted as the State correspondent for Uttar Pradesh based in Lucknow. Subsequently, she served on the national news bureaus for The India Post, The Independent and The Statesman.

In 1994, she moved to The Times of India, working on its editorial page and becoming its principal leader writer. She wrote commentaries on politics and international affairs.

In 2004, she joined The Hindu as a Deputy Editor in Chennai and later an Associate Editor based in Delhi. She wrote news stories, editorials and opinion pieces on a range of subjects. She specializes in the electoral politics of the Hindi belt. Her coverage include issues of communalism, civil liberties, democracy, as well as party politics.

In 2010, she won the Ramnath Goenka Excellence in Journalism Award for Commentary and Interpretive Writing. The Foundation cited her "lucid and incisive opinion pieces that went beyond the headlines." In March 2014, she was chosen as a respondent to Jaswant Singh in a Citizen-Politician Debate on the Bharatiya Janata Party by Lila Interactions.

In 2013, after Vidya Subrahmaniam wrote an op-ed in The Hindu about Sardar Patel's handling of the Rashtriya Swayamsevak Sangh in 1948–49, she received threatening calls and messages, causing her to file a police complaint.
