= Siwana =

Siwana Gadh Siwana (Gadh = Fort)
- City
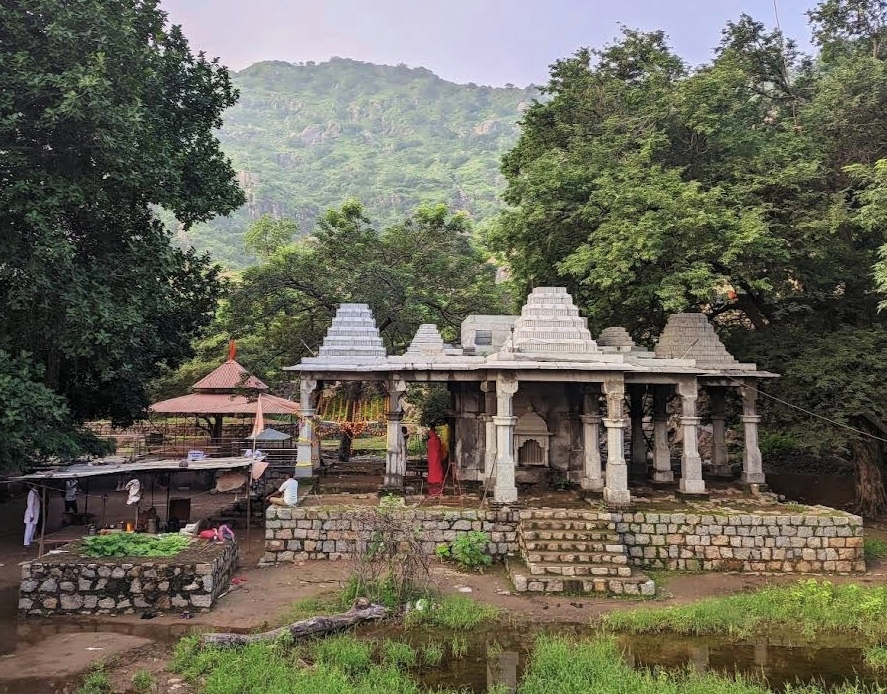
- Haldeshwar Mini Mount, in Siwana

- Location in Rajasthan, India Siwana (India)
- Coordinates: 25°37′59″N 72°25′0″E
- Country: India
- State: Rajasthan
- District: Balotra district

Government
  - Body: Municipality Tehsil and Sub Division
- Elevation: 184 m (604 ft)

Population
  - Total: 213,648

Languages
  - Official: Hindi& Marwari [Siwanchi]
- Time zone: UTC+5:30 (IST)
- PIN: 344044
- Telephone code: +912901
- Vehicle registration: RJ-39
- Nearest city: Balotra
- Lok Sabha constituency: Barmer (Lok Sabha constituency)
- Vidhan Sabha constituency: Siwana
- Civic agency: TEHSIL
- Website: www.siwana.in

Siwana is a Municipality & Tehsil in Balotra district in Indian state of Rajasthan, located 151 km from Barmer. The place is known for its fort which is locally known as Gadh Siwana, Gadh means Fort. Siwana contains 130 villages and has a total population of 213,648, 111,155 male and 102,493 female.

The closest large city to Siwana is Balotra, 35 km from Siwana.

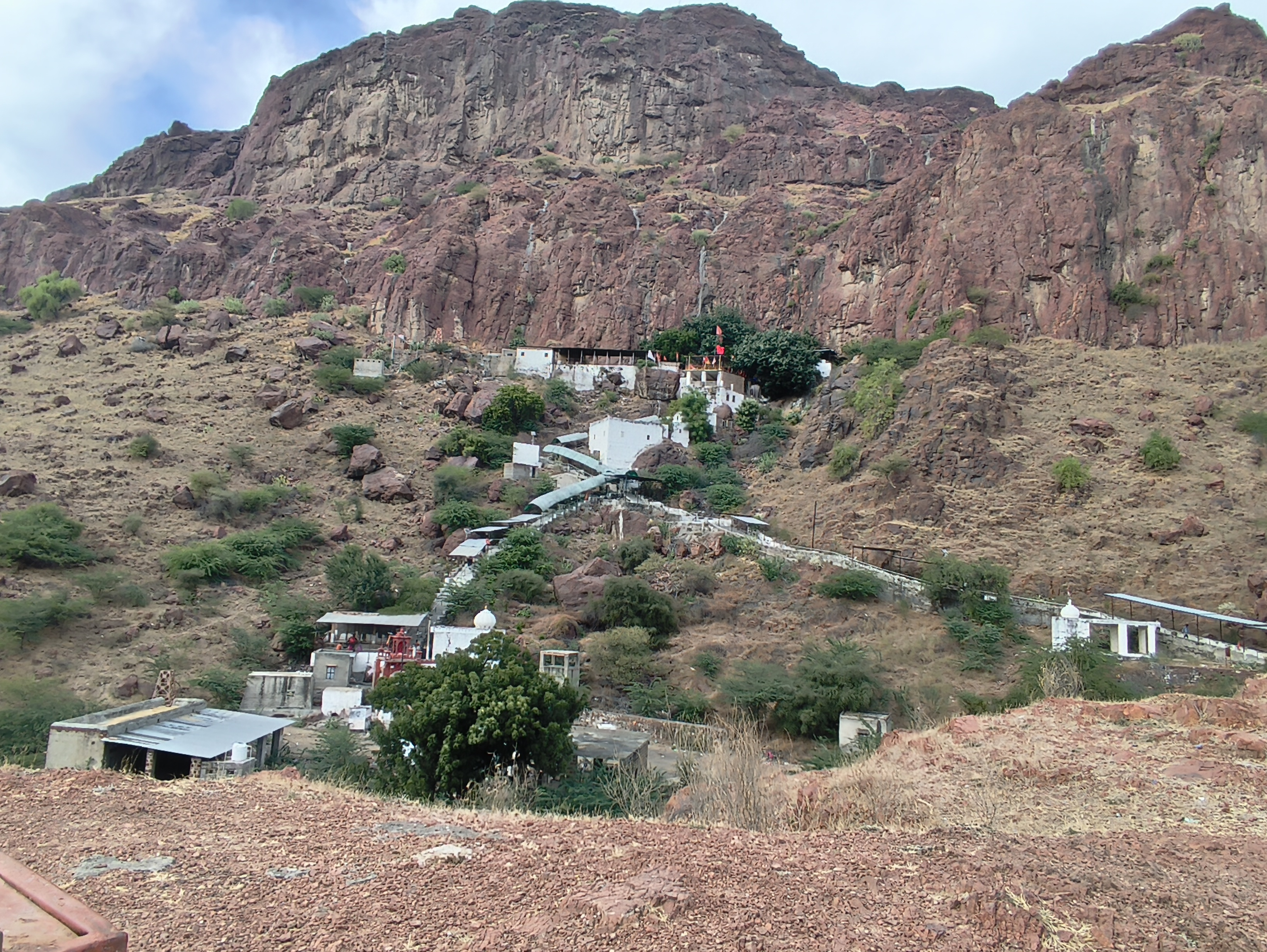
Hinglaj mata mandir..

== Fort ==
The ruined Siwana fort (Gadh Siwana) is situated on a hilltop. According to bardic tradition, Siwana was established by Vira-narayana, a son of the 11th century Paramara king Bhoja.

In 1308, Alauddin Khalji of Delhi Sultanate defeated Sitala Deva, the local ruler. To commemorate Sitala Deva's heroic defence of the fort, an annual fair called the Kalyan Singh Ka Mela is still held within the precincts of the fort in the month of Shraavana (July-Aug). Later, in 1318–20, Luntiga Chauhan stormed the fort of Siwana and slaughtered its Muslim garrison. It was later captured by the Rathors of Marwar and remained a part of Marwar until the independence of India. Siwana was the capital of Rao Chandrasen Rathore when he had opposed the Mughal emperor. Siwana was captured by Akbar in 1576, but was later restored to Raja Udai Singh of Marwar.

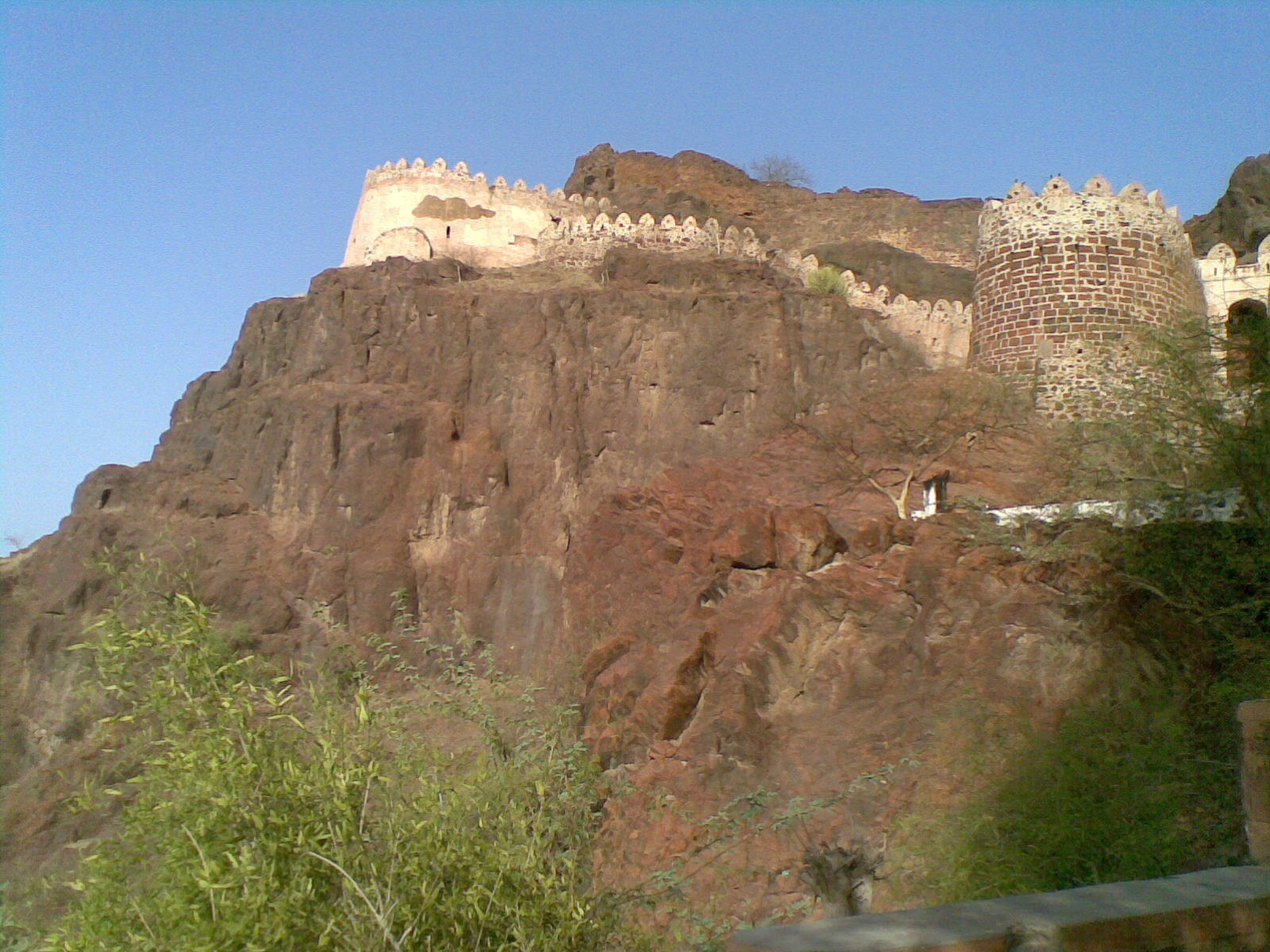
Fort view from below

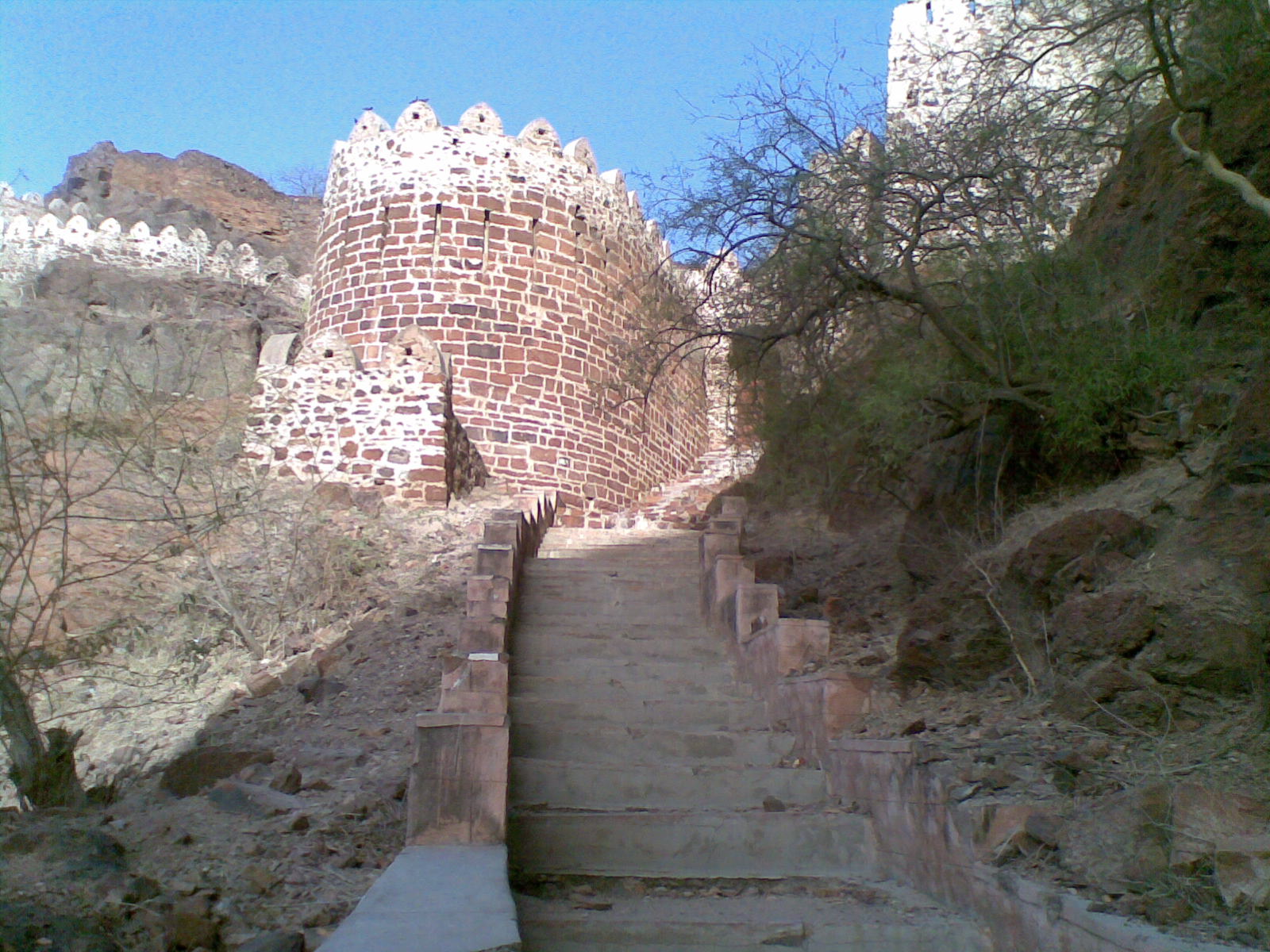
View of fort during Upstairs

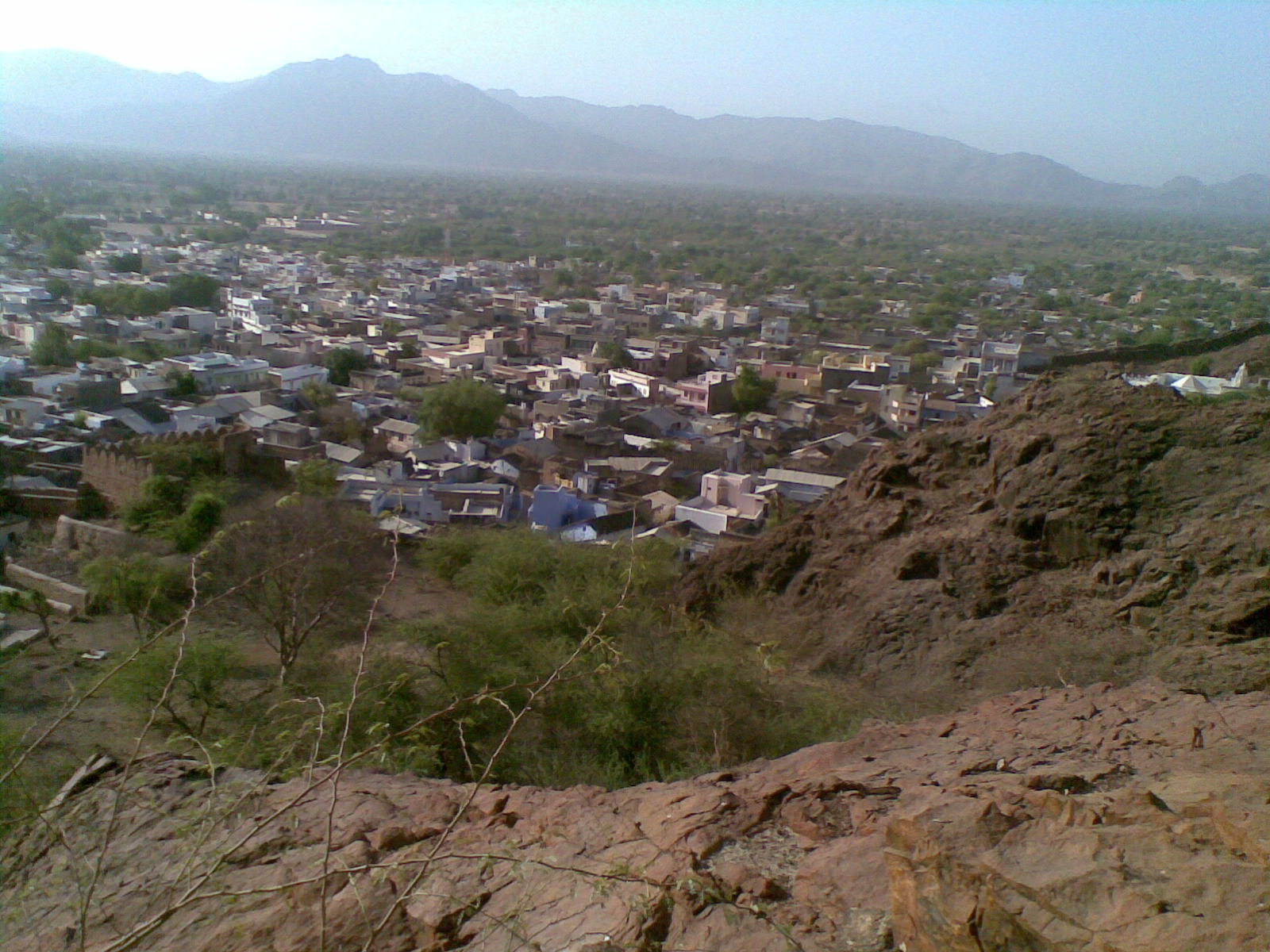
Down View of the village from the fort.

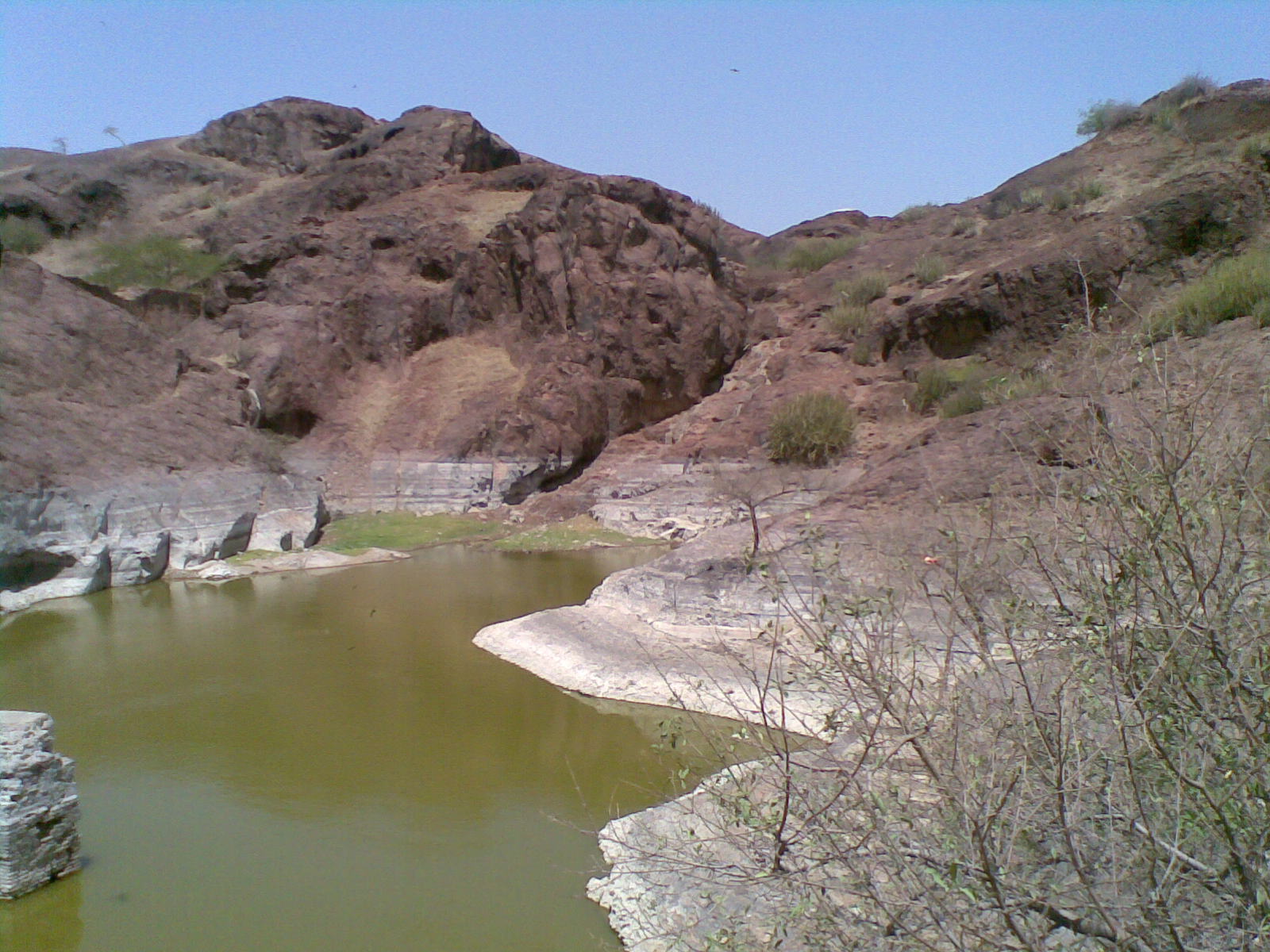
Lake - Gadh Siwana (Fort)

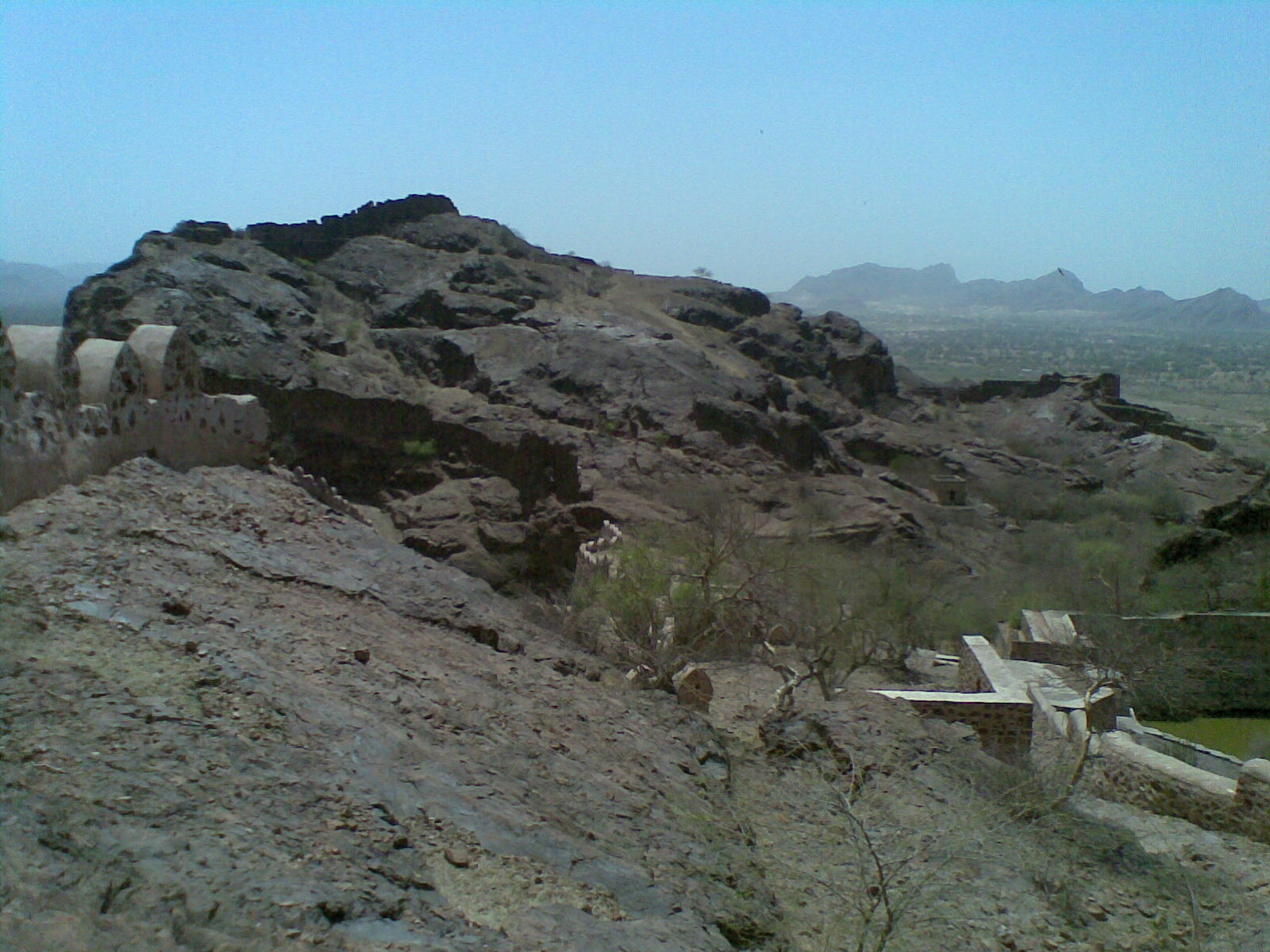
Inside broken portion Gadh Siwana - Fort

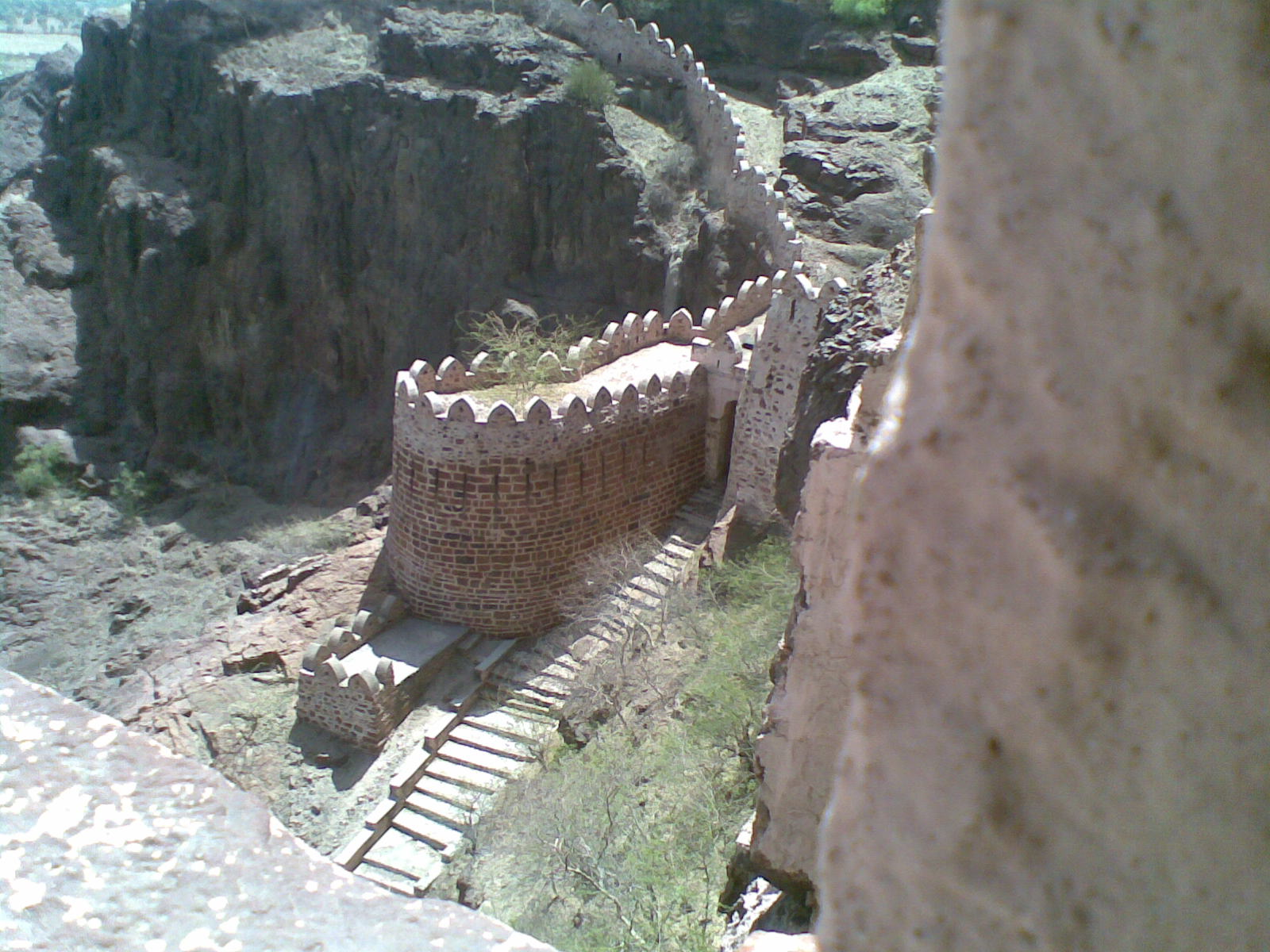
Entry of Fort from the top of Fort - Gadh Siwana

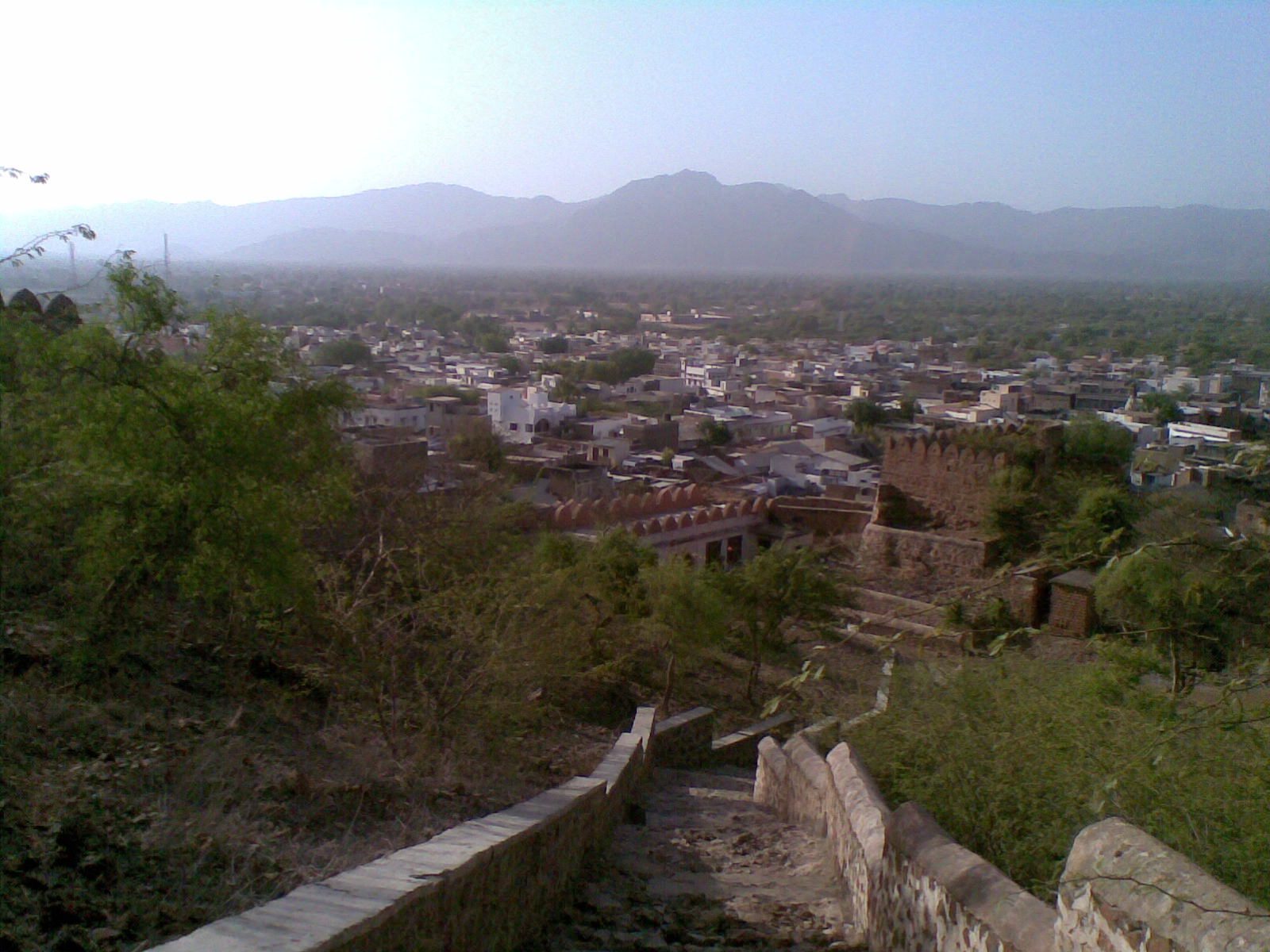
Down Stairs from the Fort - Gadh Siwana

== Temple ==
- Haldeshwar Mahadev Temple, popularly known as Mini Mount, is situated in Siwana amidst the Aravali mountain ranges.
- Hinglaj mata mandir

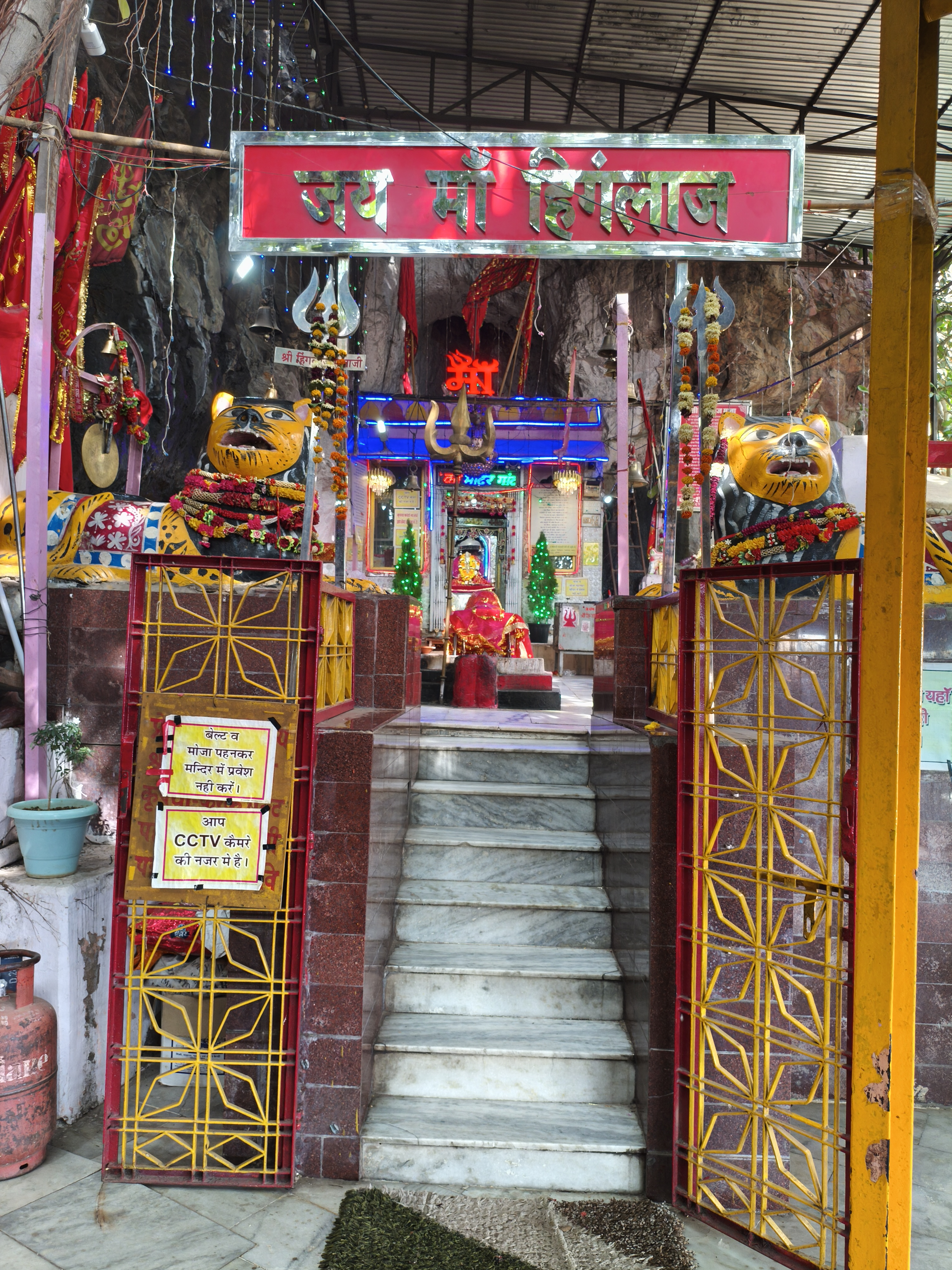
Hinglaj mata mandir

== Notable people ==
The present MLA of Siwana is Hameer Singh Bhayal from BJP who defeated Sunil parihar from indefedent.. Motilal Oswal, an entrepreneur in the financial services space, was born in the small village of Padru in the Siwana tehsil.
