= Kailash Choudhary =

Indian politician

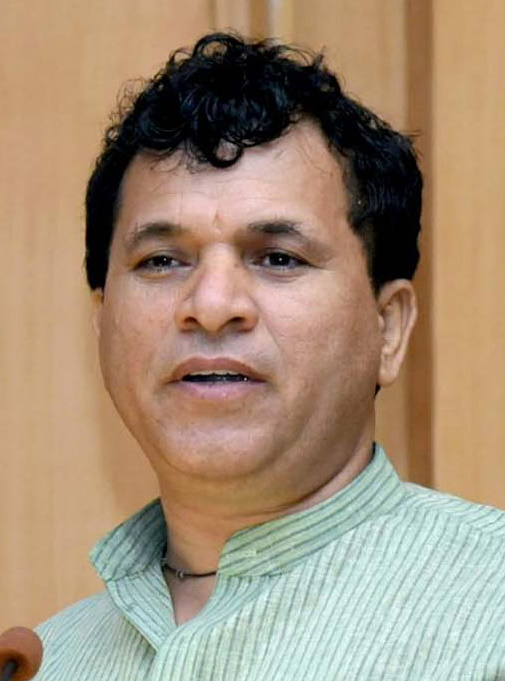

Minister of State for Agriculture and Farmers' Welfare
- In office 30 May 2019 – 11 June 2024 Serving with Parshottam Rupala (until 2021) and Shobha Karandlaje (since 2021 -2024)
- Prime Minister: Narendra Modi
- Minister: Narendra Singh Tomar
- Preceded by: Gajendra Singh Shekhawat
- Succeeded by: Bhagirath Choudhary

Member of Parliament, Lok Sabha
- In office 23 May 2019 – 4 June 2024
- Preceded by: Sona Ram
- Succeeded by: Ummeda Ram Beniwal
- Constituency: Barmer

Member of the Rajasthan Legislative Assembly
- In office 2013–2018
- Preceded by: Sona Ram
- Succeeded by: Harish Chaudhary
- Constituency: Baytoo

President Bhartiya Janta Party Kishan Morcha Rajasthan
- Incumbent
- Assumed office 2013

Personal details
- Born: 20 September 1973 (age 52) Baytu, Rajasthan, India
- Party: Bharatiya Janata Party
- Spouse: Smt. Rupon Devi
- Children: 2
- Profession: Politician

Kailash Choudhary (born 20 September 1973) is an Indian politician who is Former Minister of State for Agriculture and Farmers' Welfare in Second Modi ministry. He is Former Member of Parliament from Barmer.

== Early life and education ==
Kailash Choudhary was born to father Taga Ram and mother Chuki Devi. He married Rupon Devi and has two sons. He was educated at the Nagpur University.

== Career ==
He was a former member of the Rajasthan Legislative Assembly representing the Baytu Vidhan Sabha constituency of Rajasthan. He is a Bharatiya Janata Party member.

On 31 May 2019, Choudhary became Minister of State for Agriculture and Farmers Welfare and served there till 11 June 2024.
