= Balaram Moondh =

Indian politician

Bala Ram Choudhary
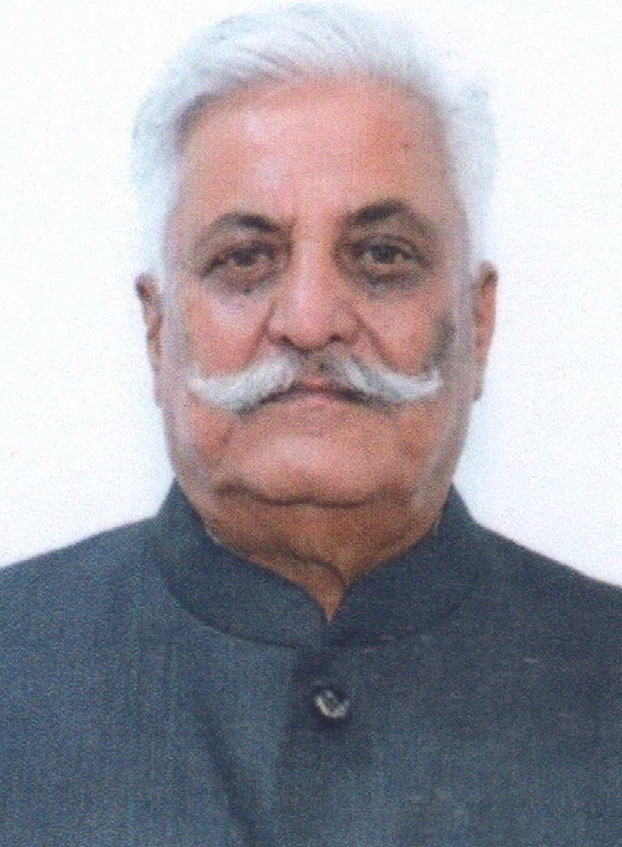
- Balaram Moond in 2023
- Constituency: Baytoo

Personal details
- Born: 1 December 1957 (age 68)
- Party: Bharatiya Janata Party

Bala Ram Choudhary also known as Balaram Moondh is an Indian politician who contested the 2023 Rajasthan Assembly elections from the Baytu constituency. He represents the Bharatiya Janata Party (BJP).
