= Baytoo Assembly constituency =

Legislative Assembly constituency in Rajasthan State, India

Coordinates: 25.9°N 71.77°E

Baytoo
- Constituency No. 136 for the Rajasthan Legislative Assembly

Constituency details
- Country: India
- Region: North India
- State: Rajasthan
- District: Barmer
- Lok Sabha constituency: Barmer
- Established: 2008
- Total electors: 252,401
- Reservation: None

Member of Legislative Assembly
- 16th Rajasthan Legislative Assembly
- Incumbent Harish Chaudhary
- Party: Indian National Congress
- Elected year: 2023

Baytoo Assembly constituency is one of the 200 Legislative Assembly constituencies of Rajasthan state in India.

Baytu Constituency is now part of Balotra, which became a new district in Rajasthan after separating from Barmer district.

== Members ==
Year	Member	Party
2008	Sona Ram Choudhary	Indian National Congress
2013	Kailash Chaudhary	Bharatiya Janata Party
2018	Harish Chaudhary	Indian National Congress
2023	Harish Chaudhary	Indian National Congress

== Election results ==
=== 2023 ===
2023 Rajasthan Legislative Assembly election: Baytoo
Party	Candidate	Votes	%	±%
INC	Harish Chaudhary	76,821	36.0	+4.06
RLP	Ummeda Ram Beniwal	75,911	35.58	+11.28
BJP	Balaram Moondh	51,720	24.24	+2.44
Independent	Hanif	2,277	1.07	
NOTA	None of the above	2,173	1.02	−0.5
Majority		910	0.42	−7.22
Turnout		213,370	84.54	+1.15
INC hold		Swing		

=== 2018 ===
2018 Rajasthan Legislative Assembly election: Baytoo
Party	Candidate	Votes	%	±%
INC	Harish Chaudhary	57,703	31.94	
RLP	Ummeda Ram Beniwal	43,900	24.3	
BJP	Kailash Choudhary	39,392	21.8	
BSP	Kishore Singh	27,677	15.32	
Independent	Umeeda Ram Aka Amit Nayak	2,613	1.45	
Dalit Soshit Pichhara Varg Adhikar Dal	Maga Ram	2,259	1.25	
Independent	Pema Ram	1,697	0.94	
NOTA	None of the above	2,754	1.52	
Majority		13,803	7.64	
Turnout		180,678	83.39	
INC hold		Swing		

=== 2013 ===
2013 Rajasthan Legislative Assembly election: Baytoo
Party	Candidate	Votes	%	±%
BJP	Kailash Choudhary			
NOTA	None of the Above			
Majority				
Turnout				
BJP gain from INC		Swing		

=== 2008 ===
2008 Rajasthan Legislative Assembly election: Baytoo
Party	Candidate	Votes	%	±%
INC	Sona Ram			
NOTA	None of the Above			
Majority				
Turnout				

== See also ==
- List of constituencies of the Rajasthan Legislative Assembly
- Barmer district
