= Ayesha Jalal =

Pakistani historian (born 1956)

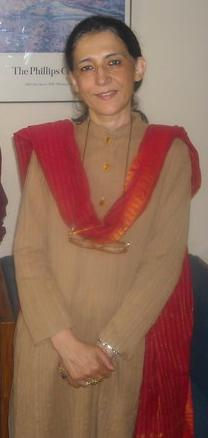
- Jalal at Lahore University of Management Sciences in May 2010
- Born: 1956 (age 69–70); Lahore, West Punjab, Pakistan
- Education: Wellesley College; Trinity College, Cambridge
- Known for: The Sole Spokesman; Scholarship on Muhammad Ali Jinnah and Muslim identity in South Asia
- Spouse: Sugata Bose
- Awards: MacArthur Fellowship (1998); Sitara-i-Imtiaz (2009)
- Scientific career
- Fields: History, South Asian studies
- Workplaces: Tufts University; Harvard University; Columbia University; University of Wisconsin–Madison; Lahore University of Management Sciences

Ayesha Jalal (Punjabi, Urdu: عائشہ جلال) is a Pakistani-American historian known for her work documenting the biography and career of Muhammad Ali Jinnah, the founder and first Governor-General of Pakistan. She is currently the Mary Richardson Professor of History at Tufts University. Earlier in her career, Jalal taught at Harvard University and Columbia University. She was the recipient of the 1998 MacArthur Foundation Fellowship.

== Family and early life ==
Jalal was born in Lahore, Pakistan in 1956, to Hamid Jalal, a senior Pakistani civil servant, and his wife Zakia Jalal. She is related in two ways to the Urdu writer Saadat Hasan Manto. Her paternal grandmother was the sister of Manto. Secondly, Manto's wife Safia was the sister of Ayesha's mother Zakia Jalal. In other words, the uncle-nephew pair of Manto and Hamid Jalal were married to the sisters Safia and Zakia.

Jalal is married to the distinguished Indian historian Sugata Bose, who is a professor of history at Harvard. He is a grand-nephew of the Indian Bengali freedom fighter Subhash Chandra Bose.

== Education ==
Ayesha Jalal moved to New York City at the age of 14, when her father was posted at Pakistan's Mission to the United Nations. She obtained her BA in History and Political Science, from Wellesley College, USA, and her doctorate in history from Trinity College at University of Cambridge, where she wrote her Ph.D. dissertation: 'Jinnah, the Muslim League and the Demand for Pakistan'.

She stayed at Cambridge until 1987, working as a fellow of Trinity College and later as a Leverhulme Fellow. She moved to Washington, D.C. in 1985, to work as a fellow at the Woodrow Wilson Center and later as Academy Scholar at Harvard's Academy for International and Area Studies. She was hired by Columbia University as an associate professor in 1991 but her tenureship was declined after review in 1995. In 1999, she joined Tufts University as a tenured professor.

The bulk of her work deals with the creation of Muslim identities in modern South Asia.

== Career ==
Ayesha Jalal has been Fellow of Trinity College, Cambridge (1980–1984), Leverhulme Fellow at the Center of South Asian Studies, Cambridge (1984–1987), Fellow of the Woodrow Wilson Center for International Scholars in Washington, DC (1985–1986), Academy Scholar at Harvard University's Academy for International and Area Studies (1988–1990), associate professor at Columbia University's Department of History (1991–1995). She has taught at the University of Wisconsin–Madison, Tufts University, Columbia University, Harvard University and Lahore University of Management Sciences.

Jalal sued Columbia University alleging bias after her tenure review for a professorship was declined in 1995. In her lawsuit, Jalal accused the university of discrimination on the basis of religious and ethnic background.

Ayesha Jalal is among the most prominent American academics who write on the history of South Asia. In her book, The Sole Spokesman (Cambridge University Press, 1985 and 1994), Jalal gives her perspective of what happened in the years between the 1937 elections in British India and the Partition of the Indian subcontinent, identifying the factors which led to the creation of Pakistan and provides new insights into the nature of the British transfer of power in India. In particular, she focuses on the role of Mohammad Ali Jinnah, the leader of All-India Muslim League, and the main proponent of the Two Nation Theory on which the demand for Pakistan was based. Jinnah claimed to be the sole spokesman of all the Indian Muslims, not only in provinces where they were in a majority but also in the provinces where they were in a minority. Yet given the political geography of the subcontinent, it was clear that there would always be as many Muslims outside a specifically Muslim state as inside it. This book investigates how Jinnah proposed to resolve the contradiction between assertions of a "separate Muslim nation" and the need for a strategy which could safeguard the interests of all Indian Muslims. It does so by identifying Jinnah's real political aims, the reasons why he was reluctant to bring them into the open, and his success or failure in achieving them.

== Awards ==
As a leading historian of Pakistan and South Asia, Ayesha Jalal has received numerous awards and recognitions:

- Trinity College, Cambridge Fellowship (1980–84)
- MacArthur Foundation Fellowship (1998–2003)
- Sitara-i-Imtiaz (Star of Distinction) by the President of Pakistan in 2009.

== Recognition ==
The Hindu, a newspaper of record in India, calls her, "...one of Pakistan's most acclaimed historians..." The Express Tribune, a Pakistani newspaper states, "...Jalal is revered globally as a historian of meticulous methods."

On 16 April 2016, Maleeha Lodhi, Pakistan's ambassador to the United Nations, said that she was “the greatest historian Pakistan has produced.”

== Bibliography ==
=== Books ===
- Jalal, Ayesha (1990). The state of martial rule: the origins of Pakistan's political economy of defence. Cambridge England New York: Cambridge University Press. ISBN 9780521051842.
- Jalal, Ayesha (1994). The sole spokesman: Jinnah, the Muslim League, and the demand for Pakistan. Cambridge Cambridgeshire New York: Cambridge University Press. ISBN 9780521458504. First published 1985.
- Jalal, Ayesha (1995). Democracy and authoritarianism in South Asia: a comparative and historical perspective. Lahore, Pakistan: Sang-e-Meel Publications. ISBN 9789693506297.
- Jalal, Ayesha; Bose, Sugata (1997). Nationalism, democracy, and development: state and politics in India. Delhi New York: Oxford University Press. ISBN 9780195639445.
- Jalal, Ayesha (2000). Self and sovereignty individual and community in South Asian Islam since 1850. New York: Routledge. ISBN 9780415220774.
- Jalal, Ayesha (2008). Partisans of Allah: Jihad in South Asia. Cambridge, Massachusetts: Harvard University Press. ISBN 9780674047365.
- Jalal, Ayesha; Bose, Sugata (2011). Modern South Asia: history, culture, political economy (3rd ed.). London New York: Routledge. ISBN 9780415779432.
- Jalal, Ayesha (2013). The pity of partition: Manto's life, times, and work across the India-Pakistan divide. Princeton: Princeton University Press. ISBN 9780691153629.
- Jalal, Ayesha (2014). The struggle for Pakistan: a Muslim homeland and global politics. Cambridge, Massachusetts: The Belknap Press of Harvard University Press. ISBN 9780674052895.

=== Chapters in books ===
- Jalal, Ayesha (1997), "Exploding Communalism : The Politics of Muslim Identity in South Asia" (PDF), in Bose, Sugata; Jalal, Ayesha (eds.), Nationalism, Democracy and Development: State and Politics in India, Delhi: Oxford University Press, ISBN 9780195644425.
- Jalal, Ayesha (2009), "Freedom and equality: from Iqbal's philosophy to Sen's ethical concerns", in Kanbur, Ravi; Basu, Kaushik (eds.), Arguments for a better world: essays in honor of Amartya Sen | Volume II: Society, institutions and development, Oxford New York: Oxford University Press, pp. 452–469, ISBN 9780199239979.

== See also ==
- Jaswant Singh, an Indian Army officer and politician, who expressed similar views on Jinnah as Jalal in his book 'Jinnah: India, Partition, Independence'.
