= Baytu railway station =

Railway station in Rajasthan, India

Baytu

General information
- Location: Baytu, Barmer, Rajasthan; India
- Coordinates: 25.8973°N 71.7682°E
- System: Indian Railways station
- Owner: Indian Railways
- Operator: North Western Railway
- Line: Marwar Junction–Munabao line
- Platforms: 2
- Tracks: (Single Diesel BG)
- Connections: Auto stand

Construction
- Structure type: Standard (on ground station)
- Parking: No
- Cycle facilities: No

Other information
- Status: Functioning
- Station code: BUT
- Zone(s): North Western Railway
- Division(s): Jodhpur
Location
- Location within India Location within Rajasthan

Baytu railway station is a railway station in Barmer district in Rajasthan state of India.
