= Pachpadra Assembly constituency =

Legislative Assembly constituency in Rajasthan State, India

Coordinates: 25.92°N 72.26°E

Pachpadra
- Constituency No. 137 for the Rajasthan Legislative Assembly

Constituency details
- Country: India
- Region: North India
- State: Rajasthan
- District: Barmer
- Lok Sabha constituency: Barmer
- Established: 1972
- Total electors: 252,957
- Reservation: None

Member of Legislative Assembly
- 16th Rajasthan Legislative Assembly
- Incumbent Arun Choudhary
- Party: Bhartiya Janata Party

Pachpadra Assembly constituency is one of the 200 Legislative Assembly constituencies of Rajasthan state in India.

It is part of Barmer district. As of 2023, it is represented by Arun Choudhary of the Bhartiya Janata Party.

== Members of the Legislative Assembly ==
Year	Member	Party
2003	Amra Ram Choudhary	Bharatiya Janata Party
2008	Madan Prajapat	Indian National Congress
2013	Amra Ram Choudhary	Bharatiya Janata Party
2018	Madan Prajapat	Indian National Congress
2023	Arun Choudhary	Bharatiya Janata Party

== Election results ==
=== 2023 ===
2023 Rajasthan Legislative Assembly election: Pachpadra
Party	Candidate	Votes	%	±%
BJP	Arun Choudhary	77,997	41.79	+0.46
INC	Madan Prajapat	75,468	40.44	−2.37
RLP	Than Singh Doli	22,581	12.1	+7.85
BTP	Uttama Ram	3,030	1.62	
Independent	Rajendra Singh	1,770	0.95	
NOTA	None of the above	2,209	1.18	−0.83
Majority		2,529	1.35	−0.13
Turnout		186,620	73.78	+1.58
BJP gain from INC		Swing		

=== 2018 ===
Rajasthan Legislative Assembly Election, 2018: Pachpadra
Party	Candidate	Votes	%	±%
INC	Madan Prajapat	69,393	42.81	
BJP	Amara Ram	66,998	41.33	
RLP	Narayanram Choudhary	6,882	4.25	
BSP	Shyamlal	6,370	3.93	
Independent	Hukam Singh	3,284	2.03	
SS	Pannalal	2,698	1.66	
NOTA	None of the above	3,260	2.01	
Majority		2,395	1.48	
Turnout		162,100	72.2	

== See also ==
- List of constituencies of the Rajasthan Legislative Assembly
- Barmer district
