= Kansingh =

Indian politician

Kansingh Kotri

Member of the Rajasthan Legislative Assembly
- In office 2008–2013
- Constituency: Siwana Assembly constituency

Personal details
- Born: Kotri ,Rajasthan
- Party: Bharatiya Janata Party
- Occupation: Politician

Kansingh (also known as Kansingh Kotri) is a former Member of the Legislative Assembly (MLA) for the Siwana Assembly constituency in Barmer district, Rajasthan.
