= Khema Baba Temple =

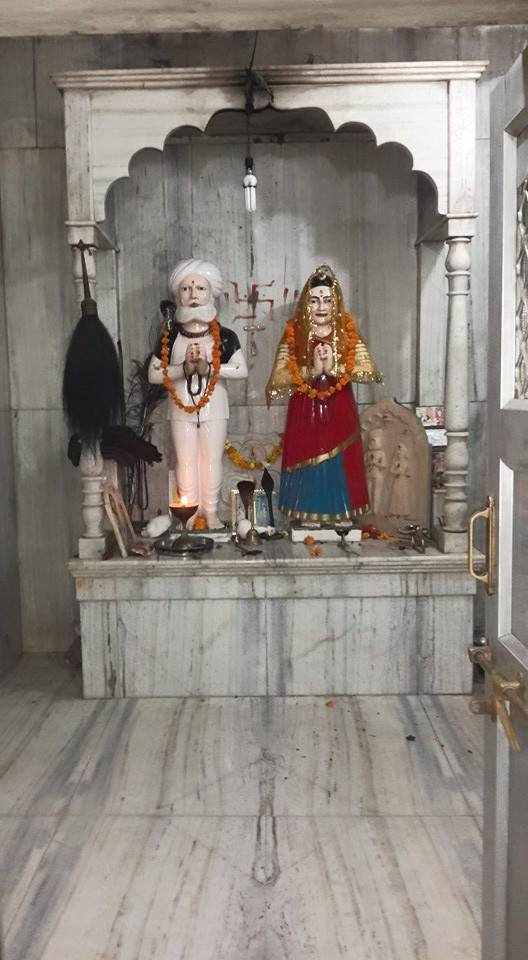
- Idol of Khema Baba with his wife Veera Devi at temple

- Location in Rajasthan Location in India

Religion
- Affiliation: Hinduism
- District: Barmer
- Deity: Khema Baba
- Festival: Khema Baba Mela

Location
- Location: Baytu
- State: Rajasthan
- Country: India
- Interactive map of Khema Baba Temple
- Coordinates: 25.89207818255329°N 71.77079243318462°E

Khema Baba Temple (Hindi: खेमा बाबा मंदिर) is a Hindu temple dedicated to folk deity, Lord Sidh Shree Khema Baba located near a sand dune, in Baytu, Barmer District of Rajasthan at Latitude 25.89201°N and Longitude 71.77074°E. It is 48 km (30 mi) from Barmer District. It is situated at a distance of 800m from Railway station and Govt bus stand Baytu.

Khema Baba was a social reformer born in village Baytu Bhopji in Baytu. He was a revered person in Rajasthan as well as in Gujarat. This temple in Baytu headquarter to commemorate him. Fairs are organized every year on magha sudi 9 and bhadrapada sudi 9, in which thousands of people take part from different Region of marwar and around.

== Renovation ==
Beginning in October 2020, renovations to the temple are underway, and as of December 2022, work is still being done. The Samadhi Sthal of Khema Baba is the foundation for the temple.

== Panorama ==
In March 2024, Rajasthan Chief Minister Bhajanlal Sharma announced the construction of a panorama dedicated to Khema Baba in Baytu, Balotra. This initiative, part of a larger effort to preserve the state’s cultural heritage, aims to educate the youth about Rajasthan's historical roots and values.
