= Madan Prajapat =

Indian politician

Member of the Rajasthan Legislative Assembly
- In office 2018–2023
- Preceded by: Amra Ram Choudhary
- Succeeded by: Arun Choudhary
- Constituency: Pachpadra
- In office 2008–2013
- Preceded by: Amra Ram Choudhary
- Succeeded by: Amra Ram Choudhary
- Constituency: Pachpadra

Personal details
- Party: Indian National Congress
- Other political affiliations: Bahujan Samaj Party; Bharatiya Janata Party

Madan Prajapat is an Indian politician from Rajasthan who has served in the Rajasthan Legislative Assembly from 2018 until 2023. He previously served in the Rajasthan Legislative Assembly from 2008 to 2013. Prajapat represents Pachpadra as a member of the Indian National Congress.

== Political career ==
Prajapat began his political career as a member of the Bharatiya Janata Party, serving as a district manager for the Bharatiya Janata Yuva Morcha, the party's youth wing. He later joined the Bahujan Samaj Party and made his first run for the Rajasthan Legislative Assembly, contesting the Pachpadra constituency in the Barmer district; however, Prajapat lost this election. He then joined the Indian National Congress, and ran again in Pachpadra in the 2008 Rajasthan Legislative Assembly election. Prajapat won the election, defeating incumbent Amra Ram Choudhary of the BJP, receiving 51,702 votes to Choudhary's 39,577. Prajapat ran for re-election in the 2013 Rajasthan Legislative Assembly election, but was defeated by Amra Ram Choudhary of the BJP, receiving 54,230 votes to Choudhary's 77,476. Prajapat ran again for the seat in the 2018 Rajasthan Legislative Assembly election, defeating Choudhary with 69,393 votes to 66,998.

During his time in office, Prajapat has frequently bucked his party, which has been the ruling party of Rajasthan since 2018. In 2021, Prajapat sided with Rajendra Singh Rathore and Gajendra Singh Shekhawat, both high-ranking members of the BJP, in calling for an official investigation into the police killing of an alleged smuggler in Barmer district. Prajapat stated that he believed that the Barmer police were not being truthful about the incident, which Prajapat described as a "planned murder". Prajapat stated that he would resign from the Rajasthan Legislative Assembly if an investigation was not conducted.

Throughout his career, Prajapat campaigned strongly for the creation of a new district centered around the city of Balotra. Balotra is the largest subdivision of the Barmer district, and there has been a longtime campaign to separate it from Barmer, fueled in part by the creation of a new oil refinery in the area. In February 2022, as a result of the state government's budget proposal, which did not include a provision to create a new district for Balotra, Prajapat vowed to walk barefoot until "the day Balotra is declared a district". Later at a dinner hosted by Ashok Gehlot, the chief minister of Rajasthan and a member of the INC, Prajapat rebuffed an offer by Gehlot for a pair of shoes and left the dinner without eating.

In 2016, Prajapat was arrested at a protest in Balotra against Rajasthan State Industrial Development and Investment Corporation (RIICO), in which Prajapat allegedly slapped a RIICO regional manager. As a result of Prajapat's arrest, the other protesters began clashing with security personnel. In the 2021 trial, Prajapat and 27 other protesters were acquitted of their charges.

Prajapat was defeated by BJP candidate Arun Choudhary in the 2023 Rajasthan Legislative Assembly election.
