= Hameer Singh Bhayal =

Indian politician

Member of the Rajasthan Legislative Assembly
- Incumbent
- Assumed office 2013
- Governor: Kalyan Singh
- Constituency: Siwana

Personal details
- Born: 16 July 1958 (age 68)
- Citizenship: India
- Party: Bharatiya Janata Party
- Occupation: Politician
- Profession: Agriculture
- Website: facebook- HameerSinghBhayal.BJP/

Hameer Singh Bhayal is an Indian politician from the Bharatiya Janata Party and a member of the Rajasthan Legislative Assembly representing the Siwana Rajasthan.

== Political career ==
Hameer Singh Bhayal contested assembly elections as a Bhartiya Janta Party candidate from Siwana Assembly constituency in 2013 and won a seat for the BJP.

Similarly, in 2018 he also again won the assembly elections. In 2023 he again contested assembly elections and won again defeating Independent Sunil Parihar and Manvendra Singh Jasol.
