= Haldeshwar =

Hindu temple in Rajasthan, India

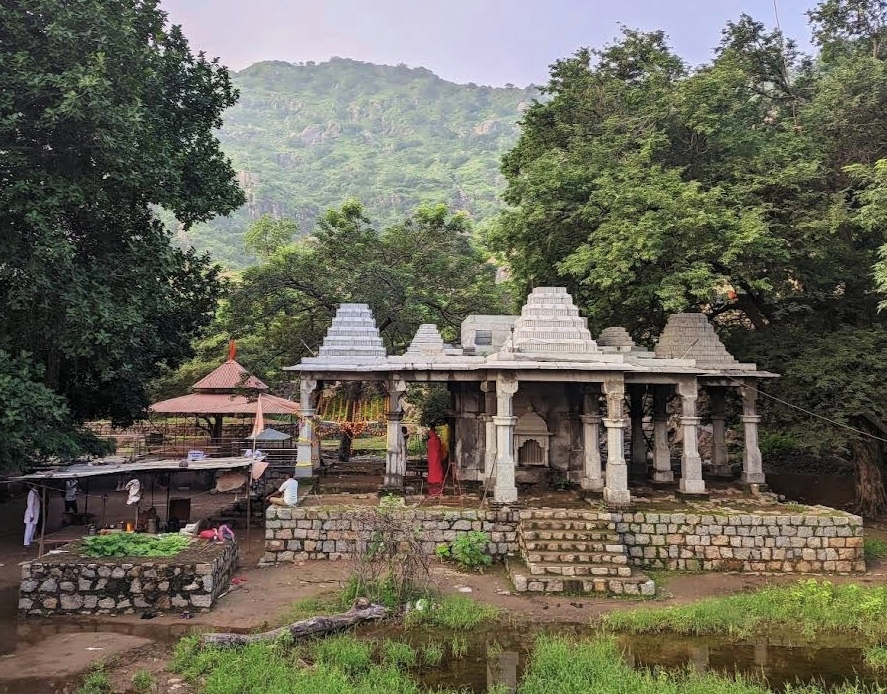
- Haldeshwar Mahadev temple

- Location within Rajasthan Location within India

Religion
- Affiliation: Hinduism
- District: Balotra district
- Deity: Shiva

Location
- Location: Siwana
- State: Rajasthan
- Country: India
- Coordinates: 25°34′25″N 72°20′47″E

Architecture
- Style: Nilachal Architecture
- Established: 1705 AD

Haldeshwar popularly known as Mini Mount, is a temple situated at foothills of Chhappan hills near Siwana in Balotra district of Rajasthan amidst the Aravali mountain ranges.

== Worships ==
The temple is unique in its status as a place of worship for Shivaites.

== Temple history ==
=== Local legend ===
According to mythological beliefs, the Chhappan Hills were once terrorized by a demon named Haldia. To be freed from the demon's reign of terror, the villagers prayed to Lord Shiva. As a result, Lord Shiva appeared under a Peepal tree and killed the demon, relieving the villagers from their fear. Since then, this place has been known as Haldeshwar Mahadev.

There is also a hill at this location where Guru Gorakhnath's cave and Dhuni (sacred fire) are found. Guru Gorakhnath meditated here for many years. Additionally, during the Mahabharata period, the Pandavas spent their period of exile (Agyatvas) here. Nearby, on a high hill, there is a temple dedicated to Maa Bhawani, though reaching it is quite difficult.

The Chhappan hills at the foot of Piploon village in Siwana are in their full glory in the month of Saavan. The rains bring laughter to their lives. The pilgrimage place Haldeshwar Mahadev is situated amidst these hills. This is the end of the Aravali mountain range.

Large amounts of devotees visit Haldeshwar Dham in the month of Saavan, despite being difficult to access. Access requires crossing seven hills and a difficult path. It is believed that the wishes of the devotees coming here are fulfilled. Devotees come for darshan all parts of India.
