= Sona Ram Choudhary =

Indian politician (1945–2025)

Colonel Sona Ram Choudhary

Member of Parliament, Lok Sabha for Barmer-Jaisalmer
- In office 2014–2019
- Preceded by: Harish Chaudhary
- Succeeded by: Kailash Choudhary
- In office 1996–2004
- Preceded by: Ram Niwas Mirdha
- Succeeded by: Manvendra Singh

Member of the Rajasthan Legislative Assembly for Baytoo
- In office 2008–2013
- Succeeded by: Kailash Choudhary

Personal details
- Born: 31 March 1945 Mohangarh, Jaisalmer
- Died: 20 August 2025 (aged 80) New Delhi, India
- Party: Indian National Congress
- Other political affiliations: Bharatiya Janata Party

Military service
- Allegiance: India
- Branch: Indian Army
- Rank: Colonel
- Unit: Indian Army Corps of Engineers

Colonel Sona Ram Choudhary (31 March 1945 – 20 August 2025) was an Indian Army officer and politician from Rajasthan. He was a four term Member of Parliament in the Lok Sabha for Barmer. He was also elected to the Rajasthan Legislative Assembly from Baytoo. A popular leader of Marwar, his career spanned both military service and active politics. He was a member of the Indian National Congress.

== Early life and military career ==
Choudhary was born on 31 March 1945 in Mohangarh town of Jaisalmer. He obtained a B.E. degree from M.B.M. Engineering College, Jodhpur (Rajasthan) and was a Fellow of the Institution of Engineers (F.I.E.). He passed out of the Indian Military Academy in 1966 and was commissioned as Lieutenant in the Indian Army Corps of Engineers into, 55th Engineers Regiment of Bengal Sappers of the Indian Army. He served in the Indo-Pakistani War of 1971 on the Eastern Front. He retired from the Army as a Colonel in 1994.

== Political career ==
After retiring from the Indian Army, Sona Ram entered politics and joined the Indian National Congress in 1994. Sona Ram rose as an influential leader from western Rajasthan and secured a place in national politics. In the 1996 general election, he was elected to the Lok Sabha from the Barmer-Jaisalmer constituency. He retained the seat in the 1998 and 1999 elections, serving three consecutive terms as a Member of Parliament in the Lok Sabha. During his tenure, Sona Ram was part of several parliamentary committees, including the Standing Committee on Defence and the Consultative Committee on Petroleum and Natural Gas, where he contributed to matters of national security and energy policy.

In the 2004 general election, Sona Ram faced a setback when he lost the Barmer seat to Manvendra Singh of the Bharatiya Janata Party. Shifting his focus to state politics, he contested the 2008 Rajasthan Assembly elections and was elected as the MLA from Baytoo, serving in the state legislature until 2013. His grassroots connect and standing as a Jat leader kept him relevant in the political landscape of Marwar.

Ahead of the 2014 general election, Sona Ram joined the Bharatiya Janata Party. The BJP chose him as its candidate for the Barmer-Jaisalmer seat, sidelining veteran leader Jaswant Singh, who contested as an independent. Riding on the BJP wave, Choudhary won the election and returned to the Lok Sabha, where he served another term from 2014 to 2019.

After nearly a decade with the BJP, Choudhary rejoined the Congress party in 2023. He was fielded by the party in the Gudamalani constituency during the 2023 Rajasthan Assembly elections, but he was defeated by BJP’s K.K. Vishnoi. Despite the loss, he remained a respected political figure, remembered for his influence in the Jat community and his long career spanning both national and state politics.

=== Jat reservation agitation and Pachpadra refinery issue ===
Choudhary was a supporter of the Jat reservation movement and, even while in the Congress, consistently raised the community’s demands before the central government. His outspoken style made him popular among the people. As an MLA from Baytu, he led a agitation against Chief Minister Ashok Gehlot’s government over the Pachpadra refinery issue, which created political turmoil and even prompted Minister Hemaram Choudhary to offer his resignation. Within politics, his sharp differences with his own party and leaders often drew attention, while his close ties with former Haryana Chief Minister Bhupinder Singh Hooda were well known.

== Awards ==
He received three honors: the Vishisht Seva Medal (VSM) from the President of India, a Commendation from the Chief of Army Staff, and a Commendation from the Chief of Air Staff.

== Death ==
Choudhary died from a heart attack in New Delhi, on 20 August 2025, at the age of 80. He was cremated with full army honours at Mohangarh town of Jaisalmer district.
