= Ummeda Ram Beniwal =

Indian politician

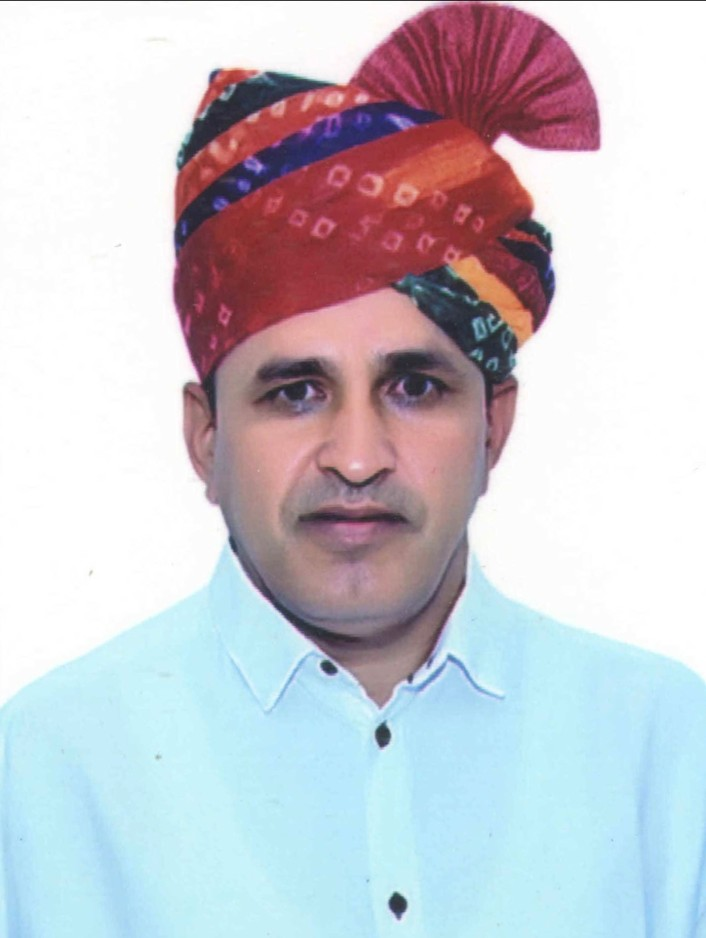

Member of Parliament, Lok Sabha
- Incumbent
- Assumed office 4 June 2024
- Preceded by: Kailash Choudhary
- Constituency: Barmer

Personal details
- Born: 15 July 1977 (age 48) Pooniyon Ka Tala, Baytu, Rajasthan
- Party: Indian National Congress
- Other political affiliations: Rashtriya Loktantrik Party (till 2024)
- Education: Bachelor of Arts
- Alma mater: Maharshi Dayanand Saraswati University

Ummeda Ram Beniwal (born 15 July 1977; Hindi pronunciation: [ʊmːeːd̪aː ɾaːm beːn̪iːʋaːl]) is an Indian politician from Barmer, Rajasthan. He was elected to the Lok Sabha from Barmer in 2024. He is a member of Indian National Congress.

== Political career ==
He was a member of Rashtriya Loktantrik Party until 2024, then he joined Indian National Congress on 16 March 2024, in Jaipur. In the 2024 Indian general elections, he won as a member of Congress and became a Member of 18th Lok Sabha from Barmer.
