= Barmer Lok Sabha constituency =

Lok Sabha constituency in Rajasthan

Coordinates: 25.76°N 71.40°E

Barmer RJ-17
- Lok Sabha constituency
- Interactive Map Outlining Barmer Lok Sabha Constituency

Constituency details
- Country: India
- Region: North India
- State: Rajasthan
- Assembly constituencies: Jaisalmer; Sheo; Barmer; Baytoo; Pachpadra; Siwana; Gudha Malani; Chohtan
- Established: 1952
- Total electors: 22,06,237
- Reservation: None

Member of Parliament
- 18th Lok Sabha
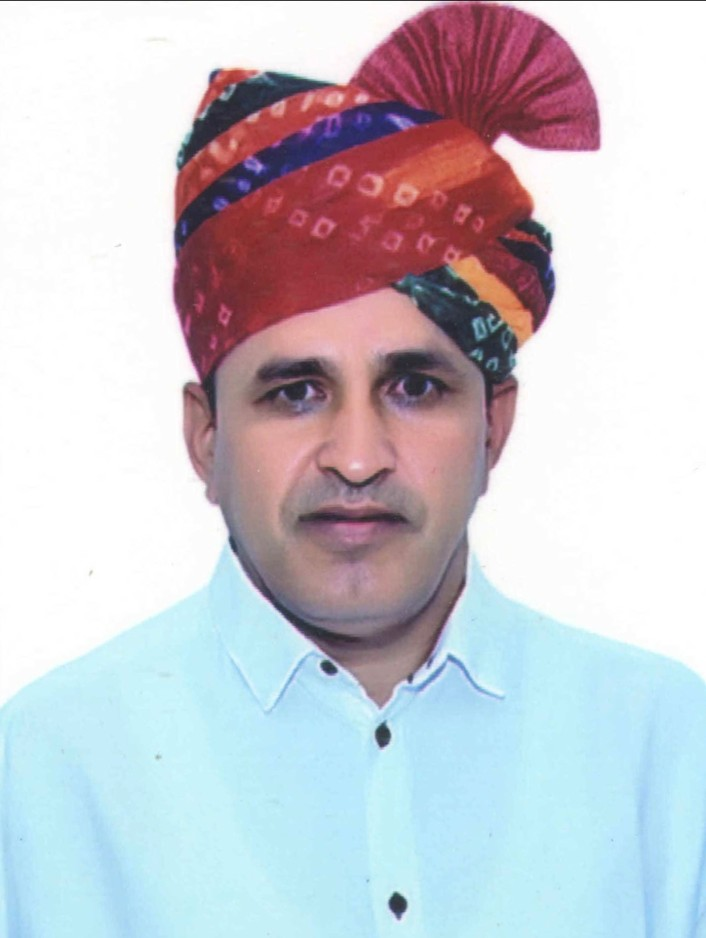
- Incumbent Ummeda Ram Beniwal
- Party: Indian National Congress
- Elected year: 2024

Barmer Lok Sabha constituency (Hindi pronunciation: [baːɽ.meːɾ]) is one of the 25 Lok Sabha (parliamentary) constituencies in Rajasthan state in western India. It is the second largest parliamentary constituency covering an area of 71,601 km^{2}, over twice the size of Belgium. Jaisalmer and Barmer, the third and fifth largest districts in India, both fall under this Lok Sabha seat.

Former Defense Minister Jaswant Singh contested from this seat as a rebel BJP candidate in 2014. His son Manvendra Singh has also contested a few times from here.

== Assembly segments ==
Presently, Barmer Lok Sabha constituency comprises Eight Vidhan Sabha (legislative assembly) segments. These are:

#	Name	District	Member	Party	2024 Lead
132	Jaisalmer	Jaisalmer	Chhotu Singh Bhati	BJP	IND
134	Sheo	Barmer	Ravindra Singh Bhati	IND	IND
135	Barmer	Barmer	Priyanka Chaudhary	IND	INC
136	Baytoo	Barmer	Harish Chaudhary	INC	INC
137	Pachpadra	Barmer	Arun Choudhary	BJP	IND
138	Siwana	Barmer	Hameer Singh Bhayal	BJP	IND
139	Gudha Malani	Barmer	KK Vishnoi	BJP	INC
140	Chohtan (SC)	Barmer	Aduram Meghwal	BJP	INC

== Members of Lok Sabha ==
Year	Member	Party
1952	Bhawani Singh	Independent
1957	Raghunath Singh Bahadur	Independent
1962	Tan Singh	Ram Rajya Parishad
1967	Amrit Nahata	Indian National Congress
1971	Amrit Nahata	Indian National Congress (R)
1977	Tan Singh	Janata Party
1980	Virdhi Chand Jain	Indian National Congress
1984	Virdhi Chand Jain	Indian National Congress
1989	Kalyan Singh Kalvi	Janata Dal
1991	Ram Niwas Mirdha	Indian National Congress
1996	Sona Ram Choudhary	Indian National Congress
1998	Sona Ram Choudhary	Indian National Congress
1999	Sona Ram Choudhary	Indian National Congress
2004	Manvendra Singh Jasol	Bharatiya Janata Party
2009	Harish Chaudhary	Indian National Congress
2014	Sona Ram Choudhary	Bharatiya Janata Party
2019	Kailash Choudhary	Bharatiya Janata Party
2024	Ummeda Ram Beniwal	Indian National Congress

== Election results ==
=== General Election 2024 ===
2024 Indian general elections: Barmer
Party	Candidate	Votes	%	±%
INC	Ummeda Ram Beniwal	704,676	41.74	+4.99
Independent	Ravindra Singh Bhati	586,500	34.74	N/A
BJP	Kailash Choudhary	286,733	16.99	−42.52
NOTA	None of the Above	17,903	1.06	
Majority		128,731	7.00	
Turnout		1,688,051	75.93	+2.63
INC gain from BJP		Swing		

=== General Election 2019 ===
2019 Indian general elections: Barmer
Party	Candidate	Votes	%	±%
BJP	Kailash Choudhary	846,526	59.52	+19.62
INC	Manvendra Singh	5,22,718	36.75	+3.35
Independent	Popal Lal	18,996	1.34	
BMP	Ramesh Kumar	16,699	1.17	
Majority		3,23,808	22.77	
Turnout		14,22,875	73.30	+0.74
BJP hold		Swing		

=== General Election 2014 ===
2014 Indian general elections: Barmer
Party	Candidate	Votes	%	±%
BJP	Sona Ram Choudhary	488,747	40.62	
IND.	Jaswant Singh	4,01,286	33.35	
INC	Harish Chaudhary	2,20,881	18.36	
IND.	Rama Ram	17,563	1.44	
NOTA	None of the above	15,889	1.30	
Majority		87,461	7.17	
Turnout		12,19,174	72.56	
BJP gain from INC		Swing		

=== General Election 2009 ===
2009 Indian general elections: Barmer
Party	Candidate	Votes	%	±%
INC	Harish Chaudhary	416,497	53.04	
BJP	Manvendra Singh	2,97,391	37.87	
Independent	Popat Lal	18,806	2.40	
BSP	Mahendra Vyas	18,320	2.33	
Majority		1,19,106	15.17	
Turnout		7,85,199	54.47	
INC gain from BJP		Swing		

=== General Election 2004 ===
2004 Indian general elections: Barmer
Party	Candidate	Votes	%	±%
BJP	Manvendra Singh	631,851	60.25	+13.01
INC	Sona Ram Choudhry	3,59,963	34.32	−16.79
Independent	Arjun Ram	20,945	2.00	
BSP	Sharvan Kumar	19,636	1.87	+1.34
INLD	Hastimal Doshi	16,753	1.60	
Majority		2,71,888	25.93	+29.80
Turnout		10,48,698	63.99	+4.67
BJP gain from INC		Swing	+13.01	

== See also ==
- Barmer district
- Ladakh (Lok Sabha constituency) and Kachchh (Lok Sabha constituency), noted for their large area
- List of constituencies of the Lok Sabha
