= Arun Choudhary =

Indian politician

Member of the Rajasthan Legislative Assembly
- Incumbent
- Assumed office 2023
- Preceded by: Madan Prajapat
- Constituency: Pachpadra

Personal details
- Party: Bharatiya Janata Party

Arun Choudhary is an Indian politician serving as a member of the 16th Rajasthan Legislative Assembly, representing the Pachpadra in Barmer district.
