= Jaswant Singh =

Indian politician (1938–2020)

Major Jaswant Singh
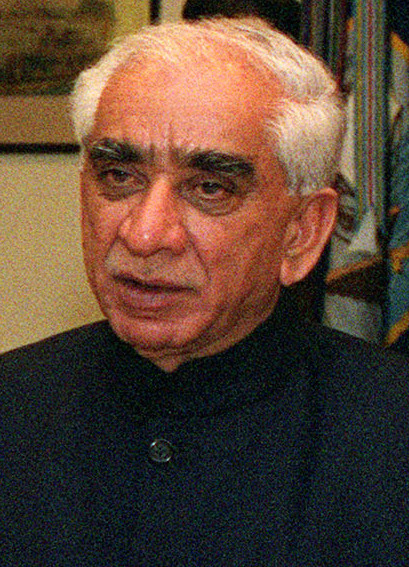
- Singh as Defence Minister of India in 2001

21st Union Minister of Finance
- In office 1 July 2002 – 21 May 2004
- Prime Minister: Atal Bihari Vajpayee
- Preceded by: Yashwant Sinha
- Succeeded by: P. Chidambaram
- In office 16 May 1996 – 1 June 1996
- Prime Minister: Atal Bihari Vajpayee
- Preceded by: Manmohan Singh
- Succeeded by: P. Chidambaram

19th Union Minister of Defence
- In office 16 March 2001 – 18 October 2001
- Prime Minister: Atal Bihari Vajpayee
- Preceded by: George Fernandes
- Succeeded by: George Fernandes

23rd Union Minister of External Affairs
- In office 25 March 1998 – 1 July 2002
- Prime Minister: Atal Bihari Vajpayee
- Preceded by: Atal Bihari Vajpayee
- Succeeded by: Yashwant Sinha

24th Leader of House, Rajya Sabha
- In office 13 October 1999 – 22 May 2004
- Prime Minister: Atal Bihari Vajpayee
- Rajya Sabha Chairperson: Krishan Kant; Bhairon Singh Shekhawat
- Preceded by: Sikander Bakht
- Succeeded by: Manmohan Singh

11th Leader of the Opposition, Rajya Sabha
- In office 3 June 2004 – 16 May 2009
- Prime Minister: Manmohan Singh
- Rajya Sabha Chairperson: Bhairon Singh Shekhawat; Mohammad Hamid Ansari
- Preceded by: Manmohan Singh
- Succeeded by: Arun Jaitley

Member of parliament, Lok Sabha
- In office 16 May 2009 – 16 May 2014
- Preceded by: Dawa Narbula
- Succeeded by: Surendrajeet Singh Ahluwalia
- Constituency: Darjeeling
- In office 30 November 1989 – 20 June 1991
- Preceded by: Ashok Gehlot
- Succeeded by: Ashok Gehlot
- Constituency: Jodhpur

21st Deputy Chairman of the Planning Commission
- In office 25 March 1998 – 4 February 1999
- Prime Minister: Atal Bihari Vajpayee
- Preceded by: Madhu Dandavate
- Succeeded by: K. C. Pant

Personal details
- Born: 3 January 1938 Jasol, Rajputana Agency, British India (present-day Rajasthan, India)
- Died: 27 September 2020 (aged 82) New Delhi, India
- Party: Bharatiya Janata Party (until 2014)
- Other political affiliations: Independent (2014 – 2020)
- Spouse: Sheetal Kanwar (m. 1963–2020)
- Children: 2 (including Manvendra Singh)
- Education: National Defence Academy; Indian Military Academy; Mayo College
- Awards: Outstanding Parliamentarian Award, 2001
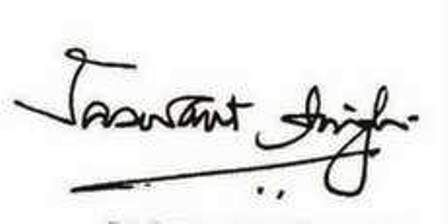
- Signature
- Website: jaswantsingh.com (defunct)

Military service
- Allegiance: India
- Branch/service: Indian Army
- Years of service: 1957 – 1966
- Rank: Major
- Unit: The Central India Horse
- Battles/wars: Indo-Pakistani War of 1965; Sino-Indian War

Major Jaswant Singh (Note: /dʒæsˈwɑːntsɪŋ/; Gujarati pronunciation: [ˈdʒəsʋənt siŋɡʱ].) (3 January 1938 – 27 September 2020) was an Indian Army officer and politician. He was one of the founding members of the Bharatiya Janata Party (BJP), and was one of India's longest serving parliamentarians, having been a member of the Lok Sabha or the Rajya Sabha almost continuously between 1980 and 2014. He was NDA's Vice-presidential candidate in the 2012 Indian vice-presidential election. Singh was the only leader from Rajasthan who became Minister Of External Affairs, Finance and Defence.

He was elected on a BJP ticket to the Rajya Sabha five times (1980, 1986, 1998, 1999, 2004) and to the Lok Sabha four times (1990, 1991, 1996, 2009). During the Vajpayee administration between 1998 and 2004, he held multiple cabinet portfolios including Finance, External Affairs and Defence. He also served as the Deputy Chairman of the Planning Commission between 1998 and 1999. In the aftermath of India's nuclear tests of 1998, he was deputed by Prime Minister Vajpayee to act as India's representative to hold repeated, long-term dialogue with the United States (represented by Strobe Talbott) on matters related to nuclear policy and strategy; the outcome of the sustained engagement was positive for both countries. After his party lost power in 2004, he served as Leader of Opposition in the Rajya Sabha from 2004 to 2009.

Singh incurred the displeasure of his party colleagues when, after the party suffered its second successive defeat in 2009, he circulated a note demanding a thorough discussion on the debacle. Weeks later, a book authored by him was released, in which he was found to have written sympathetically about Jinnah. Post the event, Singh found himself marginalised within the party. In the elections of 2014, his party decided not to field him from any constituency. He decided to contest anyway as an independent from his native constituency of Barmer (against Col. Sonaram Chaudhary) in Rajasthan. He was expelled from the BJP on 29 March 2014 when he did not withdraw his independent candidature, and went on to lose the election.

On 7 August 2014, he suffered a fall in the bathroom of residence and suffered a serious head injury. In June 2020 he was admitted to Army's Research and Referral hospital in Delhi for treatment. He remained in a state of coma for six years till his death in 2020.

== Early life ==
Singh was born on 3 January 1938 in the village of Jasol in Rajputana Agency of British India (now Balotra district) of Rajasthan, India in a Rajput family. His father was Sardar Singh Rathore of Jasol and mother was Kunwar Baisa. Singh was married to Sheetal Kanwar. They had two sons. His elder son, Manvendra Singh, is a former Member of Parliament from Barmer. He was an officer in the Indian Army in the 1960s and was an alumnus of Mayo College and the National Defence Academy, Khadakwasla.

After his education from the National Defence Academy, he was enrolled in the Indian Army in the year 1957 and was designated to the position of the Captain in the Central India Horse unit. And he was also a participant of Indo-Pakistani War of 1965 and was the commander of his unit. He was a Major at the time of Sino-Indian border dispute of the year 1965 after which he retired from the Indian Army in the next year to join politics after serving in the Armed forces for 10 years. He was a close accompany of Bhairon Singh Shekhawat and made his links with Bharatiya Jana Sangh. He was a member and associate of Rashtriya Swayamsevak Sangh from the 1960s.

== Career events ==
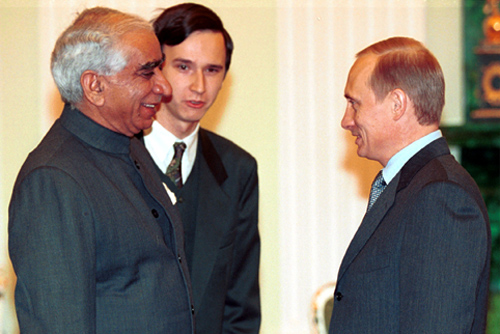
Singh with Russian Prime Minister Vladimir Putin in 2000.

In the Vajpayee government, Singh was External Affairs Minister, and later went on to become the Finance Minister. He was also the Defence Minister when George Fernandes was forced to resign after the Tehelka exposure.

Singh is widely regarded for his handling of relations with the United States which were strained after the 1998 Indian nuclear tests but which ameliorated soon after culminating in the 2000 visit of U.S. President Bill Clinton to India. His skill as a negotiator and diplomat during talks with the United States has been well acknowledged by his U.S. counterpart Strobe Talbott.

Singh has been frequently criticised by political parties for escorting terrorists to Kandhahar, Afghanistan. They were released by the Government of India in exchange for passengers from the hijacked Indian Airlines flight IC 814.

Singh was denied a Member of Parliament ticket for Barmer by BJP for the 2014 Indian general election over Col. Sonaram Choudhary. Unhappy, Singh filed his nomination as an independent candidate from Barmer constituency. Subsequently, he was expelled from BJP for six years and lost the election.

== Political life ==
Singh entered politics in the 1960s, with the first few years of his political life seeing limited recognition, until he was initiated in the Jan Sangh. He tasted success in his political career in 1980 when he was first selected for the Rajya Sabha, the upper house of Indian parliament. He served as Finance minister in the short-lived government of Atal Bihari Vajpayee, which lasted just from 16 May 1996, to 1 June 1996. After Vajpayee became Prime Minister again two years later, he became Minister for External Affairs of India, serving from 5 December 1998 until 1 July 2002. Responsible for foreign policy, he dealt with high tensions between India and Pakistan. In July 2002 he became Finance Minister again, switching posts with Yashwant Sinha. He served as Finance Minister until the defeat of the Vajpayee government in May 2004 and was instrumental in defining and pushing through the market-friendly reforms of the government. He was conferred the Outstanding Parliamentarian Award for the year 2001. On 19 August 2009, he was expelled from BJP after criticism over his remarks in his book which allegedly praised the founder of Pakistan in his book Jinnah – India, Partition, Independence. His last major position was as Leader of Opposition in the Rajya Sabha from 2004 to 2009.

He was denied a ticket by the party to contest the 2014 Lok Sabha Parliamentary Elections from the Barmer-Jaisalmer constituency in Rajasthan. He was subsequently expelled from the BJP after deciding to contest the elections as an independent candidate and lost to his former party's candidate Col. Sonaram Choudhary. Jaswant Singh was elected from Darjeeling Seat from the year 2009 to 2014.

== Ministries and Work ==
Jaswant Singh held many ministries under the government of Atal Bihari Vajpayee, including several important such as Defence, External Affairs and Finance. (Note: Under Atal Bihari Vajpayee, Singh handled key ministries such as Ministry of Defence, Ministry of External Affairs and Ministry of Finance.) He has also held many important positions including that of Electronics and Science and Technology.

=== Minister of Finance (First time) ===
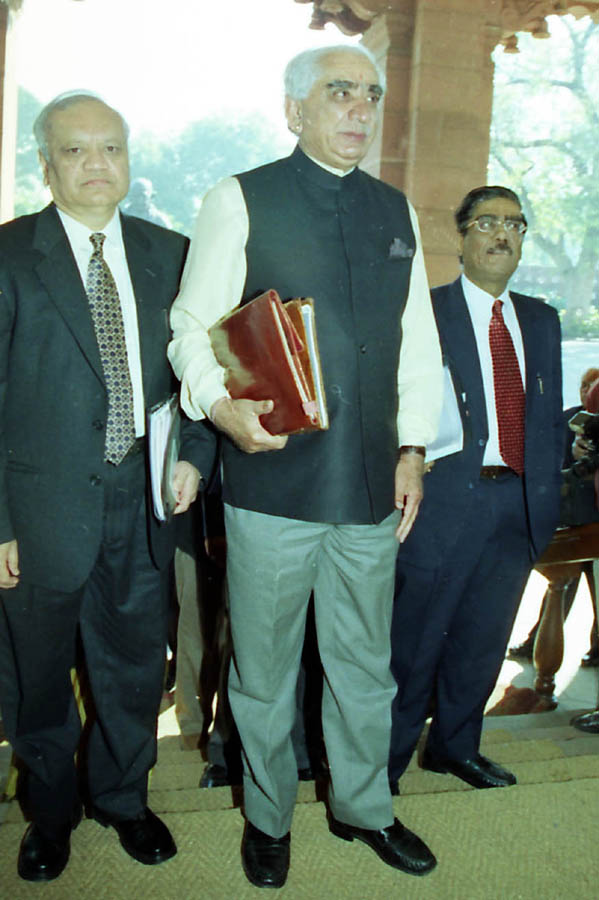
Jaswant Singh in Parliament to present Interim budget.

Singh remained as the Minister of Finance in the short-lived government of First Vajpayee government from 16 May 1996 to 1 June 1996. In the short-lived government where he was Minister for just 24 days and there was also economic difficulty, a crisis due to the political instability, and there was a loss of employment similar to the 1991 Indian economic crisis which lead to the decline in the value of Indian currency. It was followed by the instability after the fall of Narsimha Rao government. After this there was a 1996 Bank Scam after this the fall of Atal Bihari Government automatically Singh was removed from the position and succeeded to P. Chidambaram for the position.

=== Minister of External Affairs ===
After Atal Bihari Vajpayee becomes the Prime Minister of India for the second time in the year 1998, then Singh was appointed as the Minister of External Affairs and succeeded Atal Bihari Vajpayee himself for the position. He was at that time first Rajasthani to be a Minister of External Affairs of India at Union level in the Central Government. (Note: Jaswant Singh Was The Only Leader From Rajasthan Who Had The Distinction Of Becoming The Minister Of External Affairs.) Singh has been one of the most trusted man of Vajpayee and was given task of establishing better international relation with the other nations. He has represented nation at an international level in the times of Kargil War and India's nuclear test. He was part of the Indian crisis management team who went to Kandahar after the IC 814 plane hijack. He remained Minister till 5 December 2002 after the removal of George Fernandes due to the Tehelka conspiracy. As the Minister of External Affairs he launched the first free-trade agreement (with Sri Lanka) in South Asia's history, initiated India's most daring diplomatic opening to Pakistan, revitalised relations with the US, and reoriented the Indian military, abandoning its Soviet-inspired doctrines and weaponry for close ties with the West.

==== Pokhran-II Pressure ====
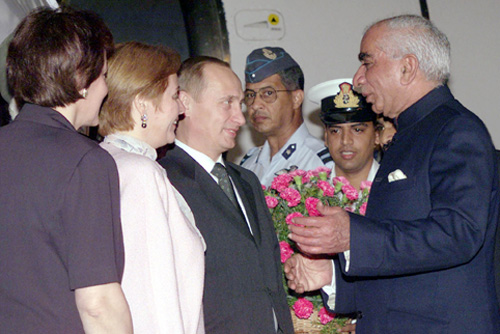
Singh meeting Vladimir Putin in 2000.

BJP, came to power in 1998 general elections with an exclusive public mandate. BJP's political might had been growing steadily over the past decade over several issues. At that time after the successful test of the Second Nuclear Bomb it was considered a masterstroke by the government, it was said that Singh along with Atal Bihari Vajpayee and George Fernandes were the one who played the important role in the functioning. (Note: The triumvirate consisted of Prime Minister A B Vajpayee, Defence Minister George Fernandes and Jaswant Singh. There were a handful more, politicians and scientists, who were in the know of the top-secret mission which was code-named, ‘Operation Shakthi’.) He was one of the members of "Operation Shakti" and among the 12 people who knew about the secret mission. His most essential role came into existence after there were made international pressure on the nation due to the secrecy of the mission when Atal Bihari Vajpayee made a public announcement for the mission. At that time strong criticism was drawn from Canada on India's actions and its High Commissioner. Sanctions were also imposed by Japan on India and consisted of freezing all new loans and grants except for humanitarian aid to India. Some other nations also imposed sanctions on India, primarily in the form of suspension of foreign aid to India and government-to-government credit lines. However, the United Kingdom, France, and Russia refrained from condemning India. The biggest affect was on the relations of India with United States and there were made many restrictions on India and at that time Singh managed to control America at United Nations.

==== Kargil War ====
Talk by Jaswant Singh
- Talk and Beyond. Published on 16 January 2020 on YouTube.

After the Kargil War and the win of Indian Armed forces in July 1999 the use of WMD led to a serious pressure of the world on India and this was led by the anger of United States against India due to Pokhran-II Nuclear test series and supported in the favour of Pakistan. At that time Singh was the one who represented India at the international level and had made many interviews with news channels and also made diplomatic talks with leaders and representatives of the United States], China, France, and many other nations. After that Singh made an interview with Atal Bihari Vajpayee in which to strengthening the position of Indian Government there was a release of a leaked conversation of Pervez Musharraf in which he admitted that he was involved in the attack on India in Kargil district in 1999 and that he also planned an attack to kill Nawaz Sharif and become the President of Pakistan. This was known to be a masterpiece and led to a very strong point resulting in the India's diplomatic relations and proving the burden of war on General Musharraf. After that India was freed from allegations of the Kargil War.

==== Kandahar Hijack ====
The terrorists of Taliban hijacked the Indian Airlines Flight 814 on 24 December 1999 on the Tribhuvan International Airport of Kathmandu, Nepal. The motive for the hijacking apparently was to secure the release of Islamist figures held in prison in India. The hostage crisis lasted for seven days and ended after India agreed to release three militants – Mushtaq Ahmed Zargar, Ahmed Omar Saeed Sheikh, and Mulana Masood Azhar. This hijack was also helped by Dawood Ibrahim and Al-Qaeda linked Jihadis. Then after too much suggestions and pressure then Prime Minister Atal Bihari Vajpayee agrees on the demand of the hijackers of Taliban and sends Ajit Doval in Kandahar and after that Vajpayee decided to send Singh as he was one of the most trusted men. He was sent to Kandahar of Afghanistan to escort the terrorists and take back the crew members. It was also said that Singh has made a secret talks with Taliban Foreign Minister Wakil Ahmed Muttawakil and made an agreement of 3 terrorists in exchange of 170 crew members including men, women and children. Later terrorists also demanded 900 crores rupees and 36 other terrorists, but somehow it was denied. On 31 December 1999 on New Year of 2000 all 176 were released and they all landed to Indira Gandhi International Airport.

The incident is seen as a failure of the BJP government under Prime Minister Atal Bihari Vajpayee and IB chief Ajit Doval said that India would have had a stronger negotiating hand if the aircraft had not been allowed to leave Indian territory. Doval, the IB chief, who led the four-member negotiating team to Kandahar, described the whole incident as a "diplomatic failure" of the government in their inability to make the US and UAE use their influence to help secure a quick release of the passengers. Singh also received criticism for praising the Taliban for their co-operation after the hostages had been returned.

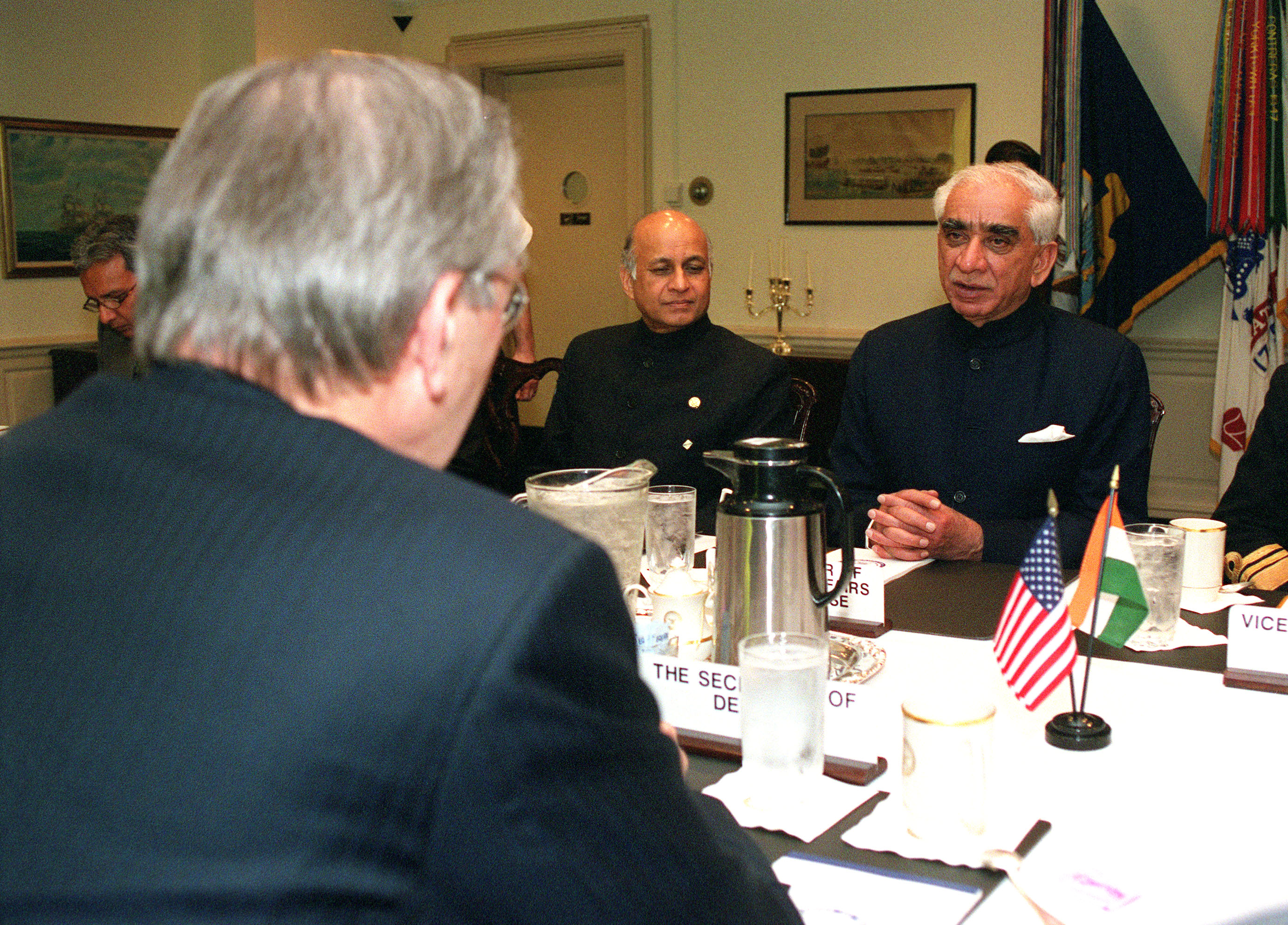
Jaswant Singh having talks on Defence on 6 April 2001, along with Donald H. Rumsfeld.

=== Minister of Defence ===
Singh was appointed as the Minister of Defence of India in the year 2000 after minister before him, George Fernandes was convicted in the Tehelka case and was forced to resign from his position. He remained as the Minister from 2000 to 2001 after which Fernandes was re-appointed as the Minister of Defence after getting cleanchit in the conspiracy. After that in the year 2002 he was re-appointed as the Minister of Finance of India in the Vajpayee Government.

=== Finance Minister (Second term) ===
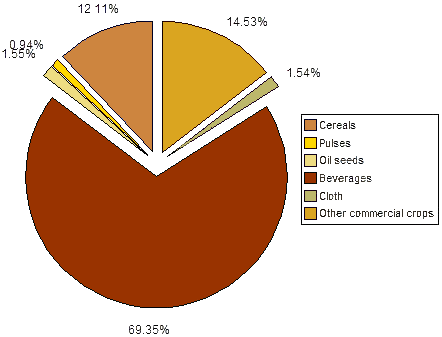
Composition of Agricultural output.

After returning of George Fernandes as the Defence Minister for the second time after getting cleanchit in Tehelka case, Singh was appointed as the Union Minister of Finance in 2002 and remained till 2004 after the Vajpayee Government lost the 2004 General Election and passed the position to P. Chidambaram. In his reign of 2 years for the second time he has been known to make market-friendly reforms in the Economy of India and due to his good diplomatic skills and good relations with other nations from the times when he was the Minister of External Affairs.

In late 2002 and 2003 the government pushed through economic reforms. Due to the good administration of Jaswant Singh the country's GDP growth exceeded 7% every year from 2003 to 2007, following three years of sub-5% growth. Increasing foreign investment, modernisation of public and industrial infrastructure, the creation of jobs, a rising high-tech and IT industry and urban modernisation and expansion improved the nation's international image. Good crop harvests and strong industrial expansion also helped the economy. The rate of stock growth under him as the Finance Ministry was also at one of the highest points in the Indian Economic Growth groth history under the period of two years of his ministry and the Inflation rate was also very much good in the period of the two years. From 2002 to 2004, the economy of India was one of the fastest growing in the world and one of the leading agricultural nations and second most output after China.

== Positions and offices ==
=== Leader of Rajya Sabha ===
Jaswant Singh was appointed as the Member of Parliament of Rajya Sabha for the fourth time in the year 1999 and after the formation of the Vajpayee Government he was appointed as the Leader of Rajya Sabha on 13 October 1999 and remained till the time of fall of the Vajpayee Government on 22 May 2004 and succeeded the position to then Prime Minister, Manmohan Singh. In the time period Jaswant Singh held many crucial positions and ministries and before that he was previously serving in the position of Minister of External Affairs of India at Union Government and in this period he served as Minister of Defence and Finance. (Note: Jaswant Singh positions from 1999 to 2004 as the Leader of Rajya Sabha; December 1998 – July 2000 – Union Cabinet Minister, External Affairs.; February 1999 – October 1999 – Union Cabinet Minister, Electronics (Simultaneous charge).; August 1999 – October 1999 – Union Cabinet Minister, Surface Transport (Simultaneous charge).; March 2001 – October 2001 – Union Cabinet Minister, Defence (Simultaneous charges).; July 2002 – April 2004 – Union Minister, Finance & Company Affairs.; April 2002 – May 2004 – Union Cabinet Minister, Finance.)

=== Leader of Opposition (Rajya Sabha) ===
After the Vajpayee's government fell down and after that Singh who was earlier a Member of Parliament from Rajya Sabha from the state of Rajasthan was appointed as the Leader of Opposition of Rajya Sabha and hold the position for a time period of 5 years from 2004 to 2009. The mastermind of Rajasthan, Bhairon Singh Shekhawat when was appointed as the Vice-President of India and at that time Singh took the responsibility of strengthening the party in Central level and main focus in the state of Rajasthan. After the fall of National Democratic Alliance in the year 2004 and the weakening of senior-BJP leaders like Atal Bihari Vajpayee, Murli Manohar Joshi, Lal Krishna Advani and the politics of other big leaders like Bhairon Singh Shekhawat in central level, Singh as the leader of Opposition shifted his politics for the strengthening of the party in ground roots and in state levels in states of Western India such as Gujarat, Madhya Pradesh and specially Rajasthan. Under this period Singh also served many non political position in the Indian government remaining as the leader of Opposition including: "Member of Committee for General purposes (from 2005-2006)", "Member, Committee on Science and Technology, Environment and Forests (from August 2004 to August 2004)" and "Member of Joint Parliamentary Committee on the Installation of Portraits/Statues of National Leaders and Parliamentarians in Parliament House Complex (August 2004 – May 2009)". After that then he was expelled from the party.

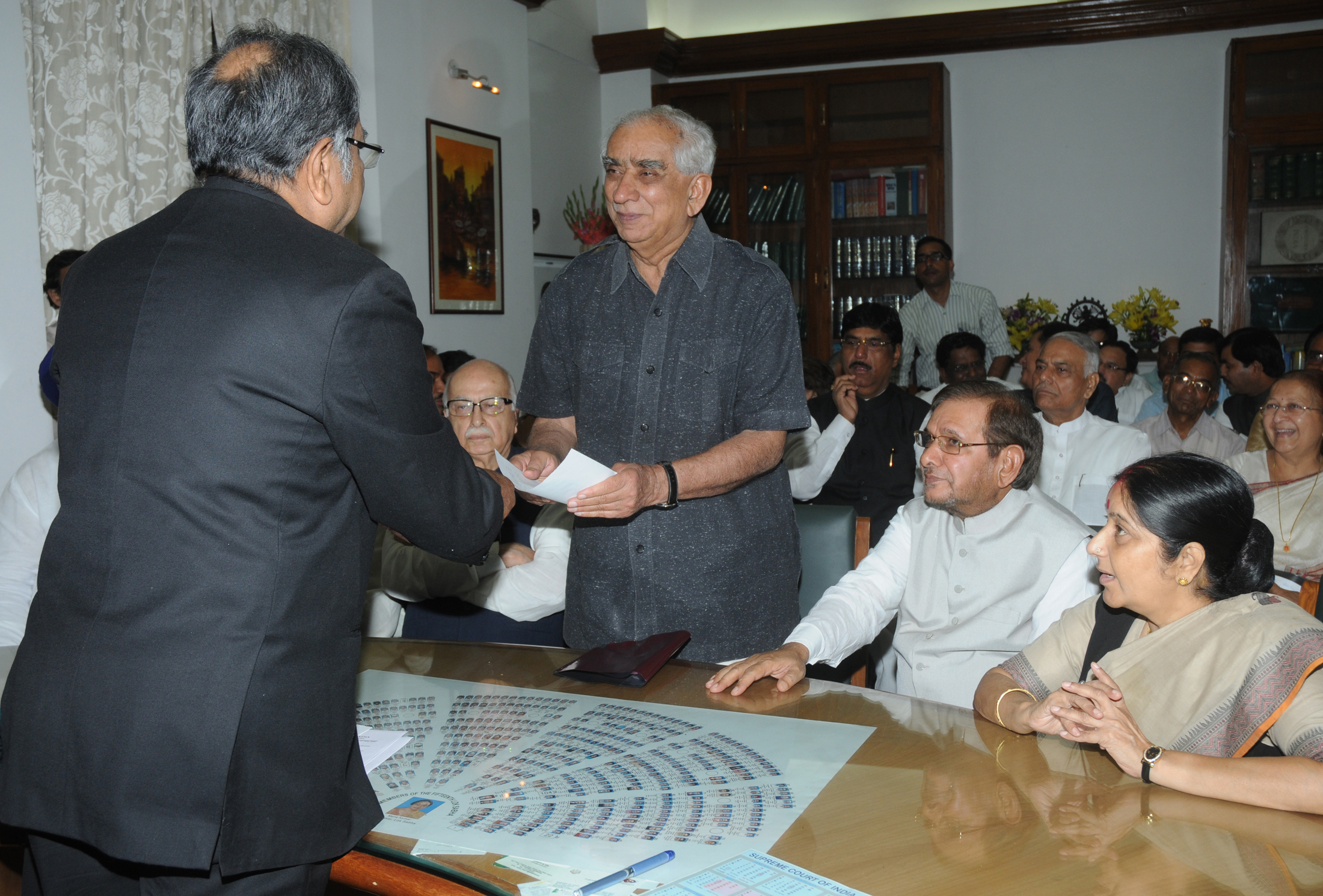
Jaswant Singh submitting nomination papers for Vice-President of India, along with Sushma Swaraj(left) and L K Advani(backward).

== Vice-president nominee ==
He was the candidate for the post of Vice-president for the NDA in 2012. Singh had filed his nomination papers on 20 July in the presence of National Democratic Alliance coalition leaders. Three sets of papers- one each by L. K. Advani, Sumitra Mahajan and Yashwant Sinha, supporting Singh's candidature were submitted to the returning officer Viswanathan. His candidature was announced by the NDA on 16 July. He meet All India Anna Dravida Munnetra Kazhagam leader Jayalalithaa and Naveen Patnaik of Biju Janata Dal on 6 August asking them to support his candidature. He lost to Hamid Ansari who was the UPA's Vice-presidential candidate. In the Election he got 238 seats and received 32.69% of the votes, while Hamid Ansari got 490 seats and received 67.31% of the votes.

== Controversy ==
- A controversy erupted immediately after the release of his book, "A Call to Honour," in which Singh insinuated that a mole had existed in the Prime Ministerial Office during the tenure of P. V. Narasimha Rao, who had leaked information to U.S. sources about India's nuclear tests. Soon after, Indian Prime Minister Manmohan Singh challenged him to name the mole. In response, Singh sent a letter to him. The letter, Manmohan Singh said later, had no signature, and no name of any mole. Jaswant Singh then backed off, saying his views on the subject were based on a "hunch".
- Controversy hovered around him again when on 17 August 2009 another book authored by him, entitled Jinnah: India-Partition-Independence, was released. In this he praised Mohammad Ali Jinnah and claimed that the centralised policy of Jawaharlal Nehru was responsible for Partition. He was later expelled from the primary membership of BJP as a result of the ensuing controversy. In interviews with media he quoted BJP as narrow-minded and to have limited thought. In 2010, he was readmitted to BJP.

== Death ==
Statement on Singh's death

It is with profound grief that we inform you about the sad demise of Hon’ble Major Jaswant Singh (Retd), former Cabinet Minister of Government of India at 6:55 a.m. on September 27, 2020. He was admitted on June 25, 2020, and being treated for Sepsis with Multiorgan Dysfunction Syndrome and effects of Severe Head Injury old (Optd) had a cardiac arrest this morning,”

— Naresh Raj, Army Research and Referral Hospital (Note: Singh, a former Army officer, had been ill after a fall at his home in August 2014 and was admitted to the Army Research and Referral Hospital. He had been in and out of the hospital and was admitted again in June 2020.)

In June 2020, Singh was admitted to the Delhi's Army Hospital Research and Referral and was being treated for sepsis with multi-organ dysfunction syndrome and effects of a severe head injury he suffered as a result of a fall in 2014. On 27 September he suffered cardiac arrest. Singh died at the age of 82 years. His death was triggered as a sign of honour and was mourned with full esteem and with state funeral. His last rites were done by his son Manvendra Singh and was cremated in Jodhpur, Rajasthan with full Hindu rituals. Due to COVID-19 pandemic only family members were present and very few relatives. Prime Minister Narendra Modi reacted on his death stated that "Jaswant Singh Ji served our nation diligently, first as a soldier and later during his long association with politics. During Atal Ji's Government, he handled crucial portfolios and left a strong mark in the worlds of Finance, Defence and External affairs. Saddened by his demise"

== Positions held ==
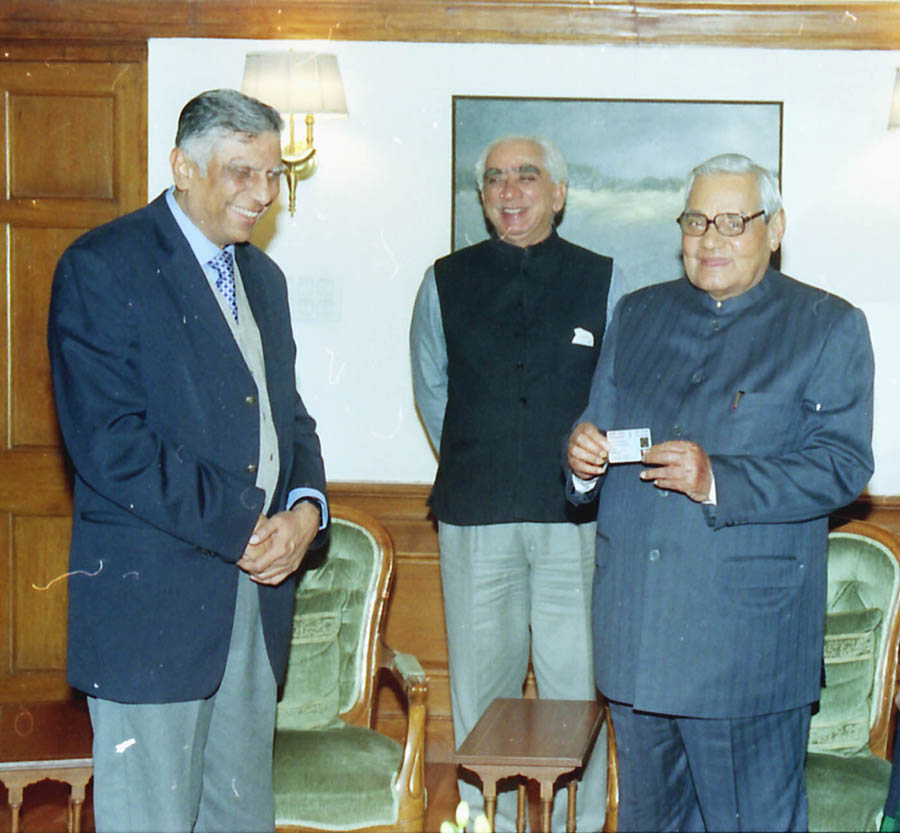
Jaswant Singh with Atal Bihari Vajpayee and P. L. Singh in New Delhi on 24 January 2004.

1. 1980 – Elected to Rajya Sabha (1st term)
2. 1986 – Re-elected to Rajya Sabha (2nd term)
3. 1986 – 1989 – Member, Public Accounts Committee, Rajya Sabha
4. 1986 – 1989 – Member, Committee on Privileges, Rajya Sabha
5. 1986 – 1989 – Member, Committee on Public Undertakings, Rajya Sabha
6. 1989 – Elected to 9th Lok Sabha from Jodhpur
7. 1990 – 1992 – Member, Consultative Committee constituted under the Punjab State Legislature (Delegation of Power) Act, 1987
8. 1989 – 1991 – Member, Panel of chairmen, Lok Sabha
9. 1991 – 1996 – Chairman, Estimates Committee
10. 1991 – Re-elected to 10th Lok Sabha (2nd term) from Chittorgarh
11. 1991 – 1992 – Chairman, Committee on Environment and Forests
12. 1991 – 1994 – Member, Business Advisory Committee
13. 1992 – Member, Joint Parliamentary Committee to enquire into Irregularities in Securities and Banking Transactions
14. 1993 – 1996 – Chairman, Standing Committee on Energy
15. 1996 – Re-elected to 11th Lok Sabha (3rd term) from Chittorgarh
16. May 1996 – June 1996 – Union Cabinet Minister, Finance
17. March 1998 – February 1998 – Deputy Chairman, Planning Commission
18. July 1998 – Re-elected to Rajya Sabha (3rd term)
19. December 1998 – July 2000 – Union Cabinet Minister, External Affairs
20. February 1999 – October 1999 – Union Cabinet Minister, Electronics (Simultaneous charge)
21. August 1999 – October 1999 – Union Cabinet Minister, Surface Transport (Simultaneous charge)
22. October 1999 – Re-elected to Rajya Sabha (4th term)
23. March 2001 – October 2001 – Union Cabinet Minister, Defence (Simultaneous charges)
24. July 2002 – April 2004 – Union Minister, Finance & Company Affairs
25. April 2002 – May 2004 – Union Cabinet Minister, Finance
26. 2004 – Re-elected to Rajya Sabha (5th term)
27. 2004 – Leader of Opposition, Rajya Sabha
28. August 2004 – August 2006 – Member, Committee on Science and Technology, Environment and Forests
29. August 2004 – May 2009 – Member, Joint Parliamentary Committee on the Installation of Portraits/Statues of National Leaders and Parliamentarians in Parliament House Complex
30. August 2005 – Member, General Purposes Committee
31. 2009 – Re-elected to 15th Lok Sabha (4th term) from Darjeeling
32. August 2009 – December 2009 – Chairman, Committee on Public Accounts
33. September 2009 – Member, Committee on Budget
34. January 2010 – Member, Committee on Public Accounts

== Publications ==
- Singh, Jaswant (1996). National Security. Spantech & Lancer. ISBN 1-897829-18-3. OCLC 1119753542.
- Singh, Jaswant (1999). Defending India. London. ISBN 978-1-349-27191-7. OCLC 1004385546.
- Singh, Jaswant (2001). District diary. New Delhi: Macmillan India Ltd. ISBN 0-333-93643-4. OCLC 48517870.
- Singh, Jaswant (2006). Travels in Transoxiana : in lands over the Hindu-Kush & across the Amu Darya. New Delhi: Rupa & Co. ISBN 81-291-1002-4. OCLC 76872107.
- Singh, Jaswant (2007). In service of emergent India : a call to honour. Singh, Jaswant, 1938-. Bloomington. ISBN 978-0-253-02800-6. OCLC 965828245.
- Singh, Jaswant; Singh, Manvendra (2007). Till memory serves : Victoria Cross winners of India. New Delhi: Rupa & Co. ISBN 978-81-291-1115-9. OCLC 132681691.
- Singh, Jaswant (2006). Khānakhānā nāmā. Naī Dillī: Rūpā eṇḍa Kampanī. ISBN 81-291-1055-5. OCLC 144754897.
- Singh, Jaswant; Bhāṭiyā, Sūraja; Manekshaw, Sam (2008). Conflict and diplomacy : US and the birth of Bangladesh, Pakistan divides. 1914-2008. New Delhi, India: Rupa & Co. ISBN 978-81-291-1335-1. OCLC 222670160.
- Singh, Jaswant (2010). Jinnah : India, partition, independence. Oxford: Oxford University Press. ISBN 978-0-19-547927-0. OCLC 611042665.
- Singh, Jaswant (2012). The audacity of opinion : reflections, journeys, musings. New Delhi, India. ISBN 978-93-81506-18-9. OCLC 820430326.
- Singh, Jaswant (2013). India at risk : mistakes, misconceptions and misadventures of security policy. New Delhi, India. ISBN 978-81-291-2907-9. OCLC 866857167.
- Singh, Jaswant; Dutta, H. N. (2011). Antarctica. New Delhi, India. ISBN 978-1611228151. OCLC 1181908479.
- Singh, Jaswant (2007). Till Memory Serves: Victoria Cross Winners. New Delhi, India: Rupa & Co. ISBN 9788129111159. OCLC 132681691.

== See also ==
- Ayesha Jalal, a Pakistani-American historian, who shares similar views on Jinnah with Jaswant Singh, as expressed in his book 'Jinnah: India, Partition, Independence'.
- Banga Bibhushan, a title instituted by the West Bengal government to honor individuals for their contributions in various fields.
- Leader of Rajya Sabha

== Notes ==
- Jaswant Singh (21 September 2007). In Service of Emergent India: A Call to Honour. Indiana University Press. ISBN 9780253028006. Archived from the original on 27 September 2020.
- Rana, Mahendra Singh (2006). India Votes: Lok Sabha & Vidhan Sabha Elections 2001-2005. Swarup & Sons. pp. 383–398. ISBN 9788176256476.
- Talbott, Strobe (2010k). Engaging India. Brookings Institution Press. ISBN 9780815721253.
- Singh, Manvendra (2013d). Campaign Diary. Barmer, Rajasthan: Rupa Publications. ISBN 9788184759839.

Jaswant Singh's positions and offices
Rajya Sabha
Preceded by N/A	Member of Parliament for Rajya Sabha Rajasthan; 1980–1992	Succeeded by N/A
Preceded by N/A	Member of Parliament for Rajya Sabha Rajasthan; 1998-2010	Succeeded by N/A
Lok Sabha
Preceded by Ashok Gehlot	Member of Parliament for Jodhpur; 1989-1991	Succeeded by Ashok Gehlot
Preceded by Mahendra Singh Mewar	Member of Parliament for Chittorgarh; 1991-1998	Succeeded by Udai Lal Anjana
Preceded by Dawa Narbula	Member of Parliament for Darjeeling; 2009-2014	Succeeded by S. S. Ahluwalia
Political offices
Preceded by Manmohan Singh	Minister of Finance; 1996	Succeeded by P. Chidambaram
Preceded by Madhu Dandavate	Deputy Chairman of the Planning Commission; 1998-1999	Succeeded by K. C. Pant
Preceded by Sikander Bakht	Leader of Rajya Sabha; 1998-2004	Succeeded by Manmohan Singh
Preceded by Atal Bihari Vajpayee	Minister of External Affairs; 1998-2002	Succeeded by Yashwant Sinha
Preceded by George Fernandes	Minister of Defence; 2002	Succeeded by George Fernandes
Preceded by Yashwant Sinha	Minister of Finance; 2002-2004	Succeeded by P. Chidambaram
Preceded by Manmohan Singh	Opposition leader of Rajya Sabha; 2004-2009	Succeeded by Arun Jaitley
