= Jinnah: India, Partition, Independence =

Book by Jaswant Singh

Jinnah: India-Partition-Independence
- Author: Jaswant Singh
- Language: English
- Genre: Biography
- Publisher: Rupa Publications India Pvt. Ltd.
- Publication date: 2009
- Publication place: India
- Pages: 658
- ISBN: 978-81-291-1653-6

Jinnah: India-Partition-Independence is a book written by Jaswant Singh, a former Finance Minister of India and an External Affairs Minister, on Muhammad Ali Jinnah (the founder of Pakistan) and the politics associated with the Partition of India. The book was released on 17 August 2009 and soon became the subject of controversy, subsequently leading to Singh's expulsion from the Bhartiya Janata Party (BJP). It contains controversial opinions of Singh, claiming that Pandit Jawaharlal Nehru's centralised policy was responsible for partition, and that Jinnah was portrayed as a 'demon' by India for the partition. The book launch ceremony was held at Teen Murti Bhavan in the presence of only a couple of BJP members.

== Response ==
Singh was expelled by the BJP following a party meeting chaired by L.K. Advani on 19 August 2009 stating that they will not "compromise on matters of ideology or discipline". The government of the Indian state Gujarat banned the book for allegedly having defamatory references towards India's first home minister Vallabhbhai Patel. However, Gujarat lifted the ban on 4 September 2009 after a court struck it down. The Indian newspaper The Hindu claimed "Mark Tully, Meghnad Desai, Ram Jethmalani, Natwar Singh and Hameed Haroon said a new appraisal of Jinnah’s role was needed and Mr. Singh had done a commendable job." In response to the book, Nusli Wadia, the grandson of Jinnah said: "My grandfather is my grandfather. You can't change the fact that I am his [Jinnah's] grandson, and I take extreme pride on being that."
