= Amra Ram Choudhary =

Indian politician

Minister of Revenue, Government of Rajasthan
- In office 2014 - 2018

MLA
- In office 2013 - 2018
- Preceded by: Madan Prajapat
- Succeeded by: Madan Prajapat

Personal details
- Born: 10 April 1943 (age 83) Parlu, Balotra, Rajasthan
- Party: Bharatiya Janata Party

Amra Ram Choudhary (born 10 April 1943) is a former minister of revenue in the Government of Rajasthan and a Bharatiya Janata Party MLA from Pachpadra in Barmer district. He is from Balotra, Rajasthan. He is the former Home Minister of Rajasthan.
