= Manvendra Singh =

Indian politician

Colonel Manvendra Singh
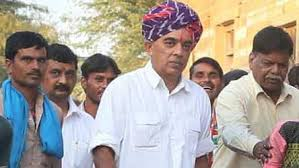

Member of Parliament, Lok Sabha
- In office 2004 - 2009
- Prime Minister: Manmohan Singh
- Preceded by: Sona Ram Choudhary
- Succeeded by: Harish Chaudhary
- Constituency: Barmer-Jaisalmer

Member of Rajasthan Legislative Assembly
- In office 2013–2018
- Preceded by: Ameen Khan
- Succeeded by: Ameen Khan
- Constituency: Shiv

Personal details
- Born: 19 May 1964 (age 62) Jodhpur, Rajasthan, India
- Party: Bharatiya Janata Party (1999–2018), (2024-present); Indian National Congress (2018–2024)
- Spouse: Chitra Singh (m.1994; died 2024)
- Children: Harshini Kumari Rathore (Daughter), Hamir Singh Rathore (Son)
- Parent(s): Jaswant Singh (father); Sheetal Kanwar (mother)

Military service
- Allegiance: India
- Branch/service: Indian Army
- Years of service: 1999– present
- Rank: Colonel
- Unit: Territorial Army
- Battles/wars: worked as a media advisor for General Ved Prakash Malik during the Kargil War

Manvendra Singh Jasol (born 19 May 1964) is an Indian politician. He is a member of the Bharatiya Janata Party. He was the member of the 14th Lok Sabha of India from 2004–2009 representing the Barmer-Jaisalmer constituency of Rajasthan.

== Early life ==
Colonel Manvendra Singh was born in Jodhpur, Rajasthan. His father is Jaswant Singh, a former Finance Minister and Defence Minister of India, and mother is Sheetal Kanwar. Singh is married to Chitra Singh daughter of Bhainsrorgarh. They have two children. He is an alumnus of Mayo College and has an MA, having studied at Hampshire College, Amherst, Massachusetts and the School of Oriental and African Studies, London. He is a Colonel in Territorial Army (India). Before entering politics, he worked as a journalist at the Statesman and the Indian Express, with a specialization in defence and national security affairs.

Singh worked as a media advisor for General Ved Prakash Malik during the Kargil War.

== Political life ==
Though Singh entered politics in the late 90s, he lost his first Lok Sabha election in 1999 against Sona Ram of the Indian National Congress from Barmer-Jaisalmer constituency of Rajasthan. In 2004, he won the Lok Sabha election by 2,71,888 votes against Sona Ram from the same constituency. He represented Barmer-Jaisalmer constituency of Rajasthan in the 14th Lok Sabha, where he was a member of the Standing Committee on Defence. He had won from Shiv constituency as a candidate of Bharatiya Janata Party for Vidhan Sabha election, 2013 in Rajasthan. In 2014 he was suspended from BJP because of his campaign against BJP Lok Sabha candidate from his father's constituency. Just before 2018 Rajasthan Legislative Assembly elections he quit BJP to join Indian National Congress.

== Career ==
He was elected for 14th Lok Sabha from Barmer-Jaisalmer constituency of Rajasthan. Singh was a member of the Standing Committee on Defence, in the government of Manmohan Singh. He was also state minister in Ashok Gehlot government in Rajasthan.
