= Baytu =

Baytu Baytoo, Baitu
- Tehsil
- Baytu
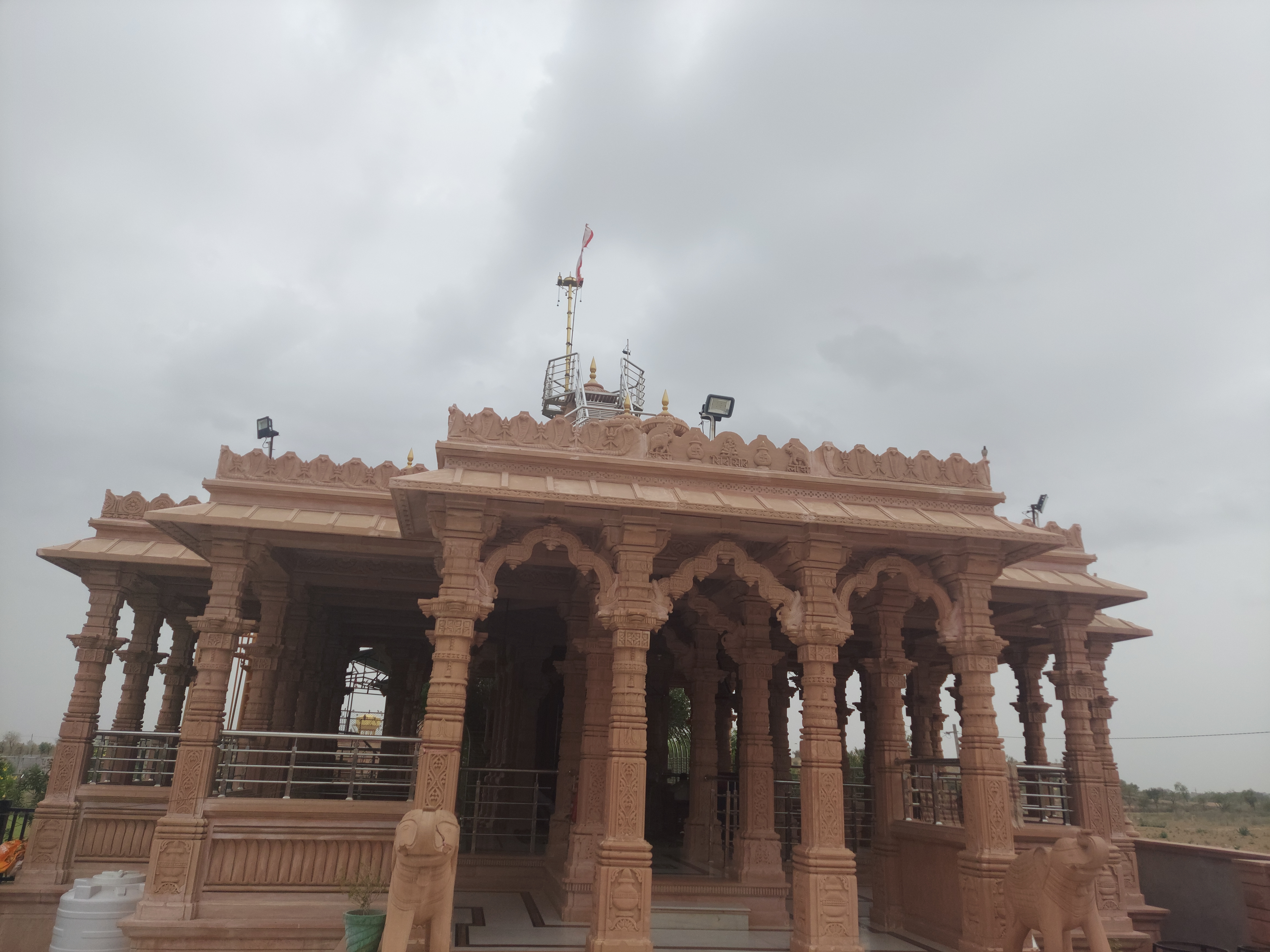
- Arneshwar Dham, Khema Baba Temple Baytu,

- Location in Rajasthan, India Baytu (India)
- Coordinates: 25°52′59″N 71°46′0″E
- Country: India
- State: Rajasthan
- District: Balotra

Government
  - Body: Government of Rajasthan

Area
  - Total: 3,099 km^{2} (1,197 sq mi)
- Elevation: 164 m (538 ft)

Population
  - Total: 2,539
  - Density: 0.8193/km^{2} (2.122/sq mi)

Languages
  - Official: Hindi
  - Local: Rajasthani • Marwadi
- Time zone: UTC+5:30 (IST)
- Postal code: 344034
- ISO 3166 code: RJ-IN
- Vehicle registration: RJ-04
- Nearest city: Balotra
- Lok Sabha constituency: Barmer-Jaisalmer-Balotra
- Civic agency: Gram Panchayat

Baytu is a tehsil in Barmer district of Rajasthan state of India. It is a tehsil headquarter. It is also spelled as Bayatu, Baitu, or Baytoo.

Baytu is divided into four gram panchayats: Baytu Panji, Baytu Chimanji, Baytu Bhopji, and Baytu Bhimji.

According to the 2001 Census of India, population of the Baytu Bhopji is 2,539, with a male population of 1,322 and female population of 1,217.
