= Ramdiyon Ki Basti =

Village in Rajasthan, India

Ramdiyon Ki Basti रामदियों की बस्ती
- Village
- Location in Rajasthan, India Ramdiyon Ki Basti (India)
- Coordinates: 25.7907°N 71.2072°E
- Country: India
- State: Rajasthan
- District: Barmer

Population (2011)
  - Total: 946

Languages
  - Official: Hindi
- Time zone: UTC+5:30 (IST)
- Postal code: 344001
- ISO 3166 code: RJ-IN
- Lok Sabha constituency: Barmer
- Vidhan Sabha constituency: Sheo

Ramdiyon Ki Basti (also spelt as Ramdeyo Ki Basti) is a village situated in the Ramsar tehsil of Barmer district, in the state of Rajasthan, India. It is located 40 kilometers away from the sub-district headquarters Ramsar (tehsildar office) and approximately 30 kilometers from the district headquarters Barmer. Derasar serves as the gram panchayat of Ramdiyon Ki Basti village. The village is known for practicing polygamy.

== Culture ==
The village is known for its unique tradition wherein men in about half of the households have entered into polygamous marriages, living with two wives simultaneously. This practice, largely attributed to reasons such as the first wife's inability to conceive or give birth to daughters, is predominantly observed among the older generation. However, the younger and more educated populace of the village tends to view this tradition with skepticism and are gradually moving away from it.

Residents who uphold this tradition often cite reasons such as the desire for male offspring or the inability of the first wife to produce children as motivations for remarriage. It is reported that women in the village do not typically oppose this practice, purportedly because the husbands ensure equal rights and contentment for both spouses.

== Demography ==
It covers an area of 795 hectares. As per the 2011 census, Ramdiyon Ki Basti had a population of 946 individuals, with 490 males and 456 females. The literacy rate in the village, according to the 2011 census, was 34.36%, with 45.92% of males and 21.93% of females reported as literate. The village has around 174 households.

Caste composition
Caste	Percent
SC & ST	7.69%
Others†	92.31%
Caste composition † Other Backward Class and Forward caste.

== Administration and connectivity ==
The village is administered by a Sarpanch (elected village head), who is democratically elected by the local populace. It falls within the Sheo Assembly constituency and the Barmer Lok Sabha constituency. For major economic activities, residents often rely on Barmer, the nearest town.

== See also ==
- Polygyny in India
