= Ankhiya =

- Village
- Location in Rajasthan, India Ankhiya (India)
- Coordinates: 25°28′59″N 71°37′0″E
- Country: India
- State: Rajasthan
- District: Barmer
- Tehsil: Nokhara

Government
  - Body: Gram Panchayat
- Elevation: 102 m (335 ft)

Population
  - Total: 2,546

Languages
  - Official: Hindi
- Time zone: UTC+5.30 (IST)
- PIN: 344033
- Area code: 91-02986
- Vehicle registration: RJ-04
- Nearest City: Barmer
- Lok Sabha constituency: Barmer (Lok Sabha constituency)
- Vidhan Sabha constituency: Gudamalani (Rajasthan Assembly constituency)
- Website: Website

Ankhiya is a village from Nokhara tehsil of Barmer district in the Indian state of Rajasthan.
