= Uttarlai railway station =

Railway station in Rajasthan, India

Uttarlai

General information
- Location: Uttarlai, Barmer, Rajasthan; India
- System: Indian Railways station
- Owner: Indian Railways
- Operator: North Western Railway
- Line: Jodhpur - Munabao
- Platforms: 2
- Tracks: (Single Diesel BG)
- Connections: Auto stand

Construction
- Structure type: Standard (on ground station)
- Parking: Yes
- Cycle facilities: Yes

Other information
- Status: Functioning
- Station code
- Zone(s): North Western Railway
- Division(s): Jodhpur
Location

Uttarlai railway station is a railway station in Barmer district, western Rajasthan, India.
