= Ameen Khan =

Indian politician

Member of Rajasthan Legislative Assembly
- In office 2018–2023
- Preceded by: Manvendra Singh
- Succeeded by: Ravindra Singh Bhati
- Constituency: Sheo
- In office 2008–2013
- Preceded by: Jalam Singh Rawlot
- Succeeded by: Manvendra Singh
- Constituency: Sheo
- In office 1998–2003
- Preceded by: Hari Singh
- Succeeded by: Jalam Singh Rawlot
- Constituency: Sheo
- In office 1990–1993
- Preceded by: Umed Singh
- Succeeded by: Hari Singh
- Constituency: Sheo
- In office 1980–1985
- Preceded by: Kan Singh
- Succeeded by: Umed Singh
- Constituency: Sheo

Personal details
- Born: 15 January 1939 (age 87) Detani, Barmer, Rajasthan
- Party: Indian National Congress (Suspended in April 2024 for 6 years – Rejoined in August 2025)

Ameen Khan is an Indian politician from Rajasthan. He served as an MLA from the Sheo five times in the Rajasthan Legislative Assembly. He is a former cabinet minister in the Government of Rajasthan.
