= Barmer Assembly constituency =

Legislative Assembly constituency in Rajasthan State, India

Coordinates: 25.76°N 71.4°E

Barmer
- Constituency No. 135 for the Rajasthan Legislative Assembly

Constituency details
- Country: India
- Region: North India
- State: Rajasthan
- District: Barmer
- Lok Sabha constituency: Barmer
- Established: 1962
- Total electors: 237,355
- Reservation: None

Member of Legislative Assembly
- 16th Rajasthan Legislative Assembly
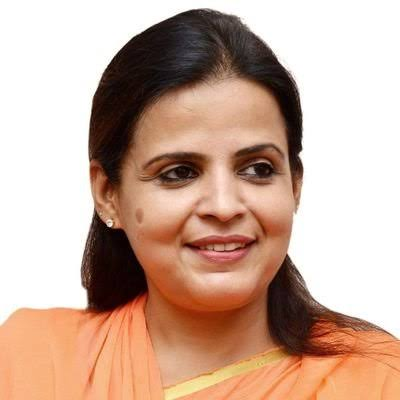
- Incumbent Priyanka Chaudhary
- Party: Independent
- Elected year: 2023

Barmer Assembly constituency is one of the 200 Legislative Assembly constituencies of Rajasthan state in India. It was established in 1962, with its first representative being Umed Singh.

It comprises Barmer tehsil, in Barmer district. As of 2023, it is represented by Priyanka Chaudhary, an independent mla.

== Members of the Legislative Assembly ==
Year	Member	Party
2003	Taga Ram Choudhary	Bhartiya Janata Party
2008	Mewaram Jain	Indian National Congress
2013	Mewaram Jain	Indian National Congress
2018	Mewaram Jain	Indian National Congress
2023	Priyanka Chowdhary	Independent

== Election results ==
=== 2023 ===
Rajasthan Legislative Assembly Election, 2023: Barmer
Party	Candidate	Votes	%	±%
Independent	Priyanka Chaudhary	106,948	49.3	
INC	Mewaram Jain	93,611	43.16	−8.79
BJP	Deepak Karwasara	5,355	2.47	−31.94
AAP	Bhagwan Singh Rajput	2,282	1.05	
BSP	Harkh Ram Meghwal	2,053	0.95	−0.28
NOTA	None of the above	1,559	0.72	−0.37
Majority		13,337	6.14	−11.4
Turnout		216,916	81.9	+1.22
Independent gain from INC		Swing		

=== 2018 ===
2018 Rajasthan Legislative Assembly election: Barmer
Party	Candidate	Votes	%	±%
INC	Mewaram Jain	97,874	51.95	
BJP	Col. Sonaram Choudhary (Retd)	64,827	34.41	
Independent	Rahul Kumar	13,678	7.26	
CPI	Nanak Das Dhariwal	2,488	1.32	
BSP	Rajendra Kumar	2,325	1.23	
Independent	Shankar Lal	1,969	1.05	
Abhinav Rajasthan Party	Khartharam Choudhary	1,743	0.93	
NOTA	None of the above	2,048	1.09	
Majority		33,047	17.54	
Turnout		188,414	80.68	

== See also ==
- List of constituencies of the Rajasthan Legislative Assembly
- Barmer district
