= Ladu Ram =

Indian politician

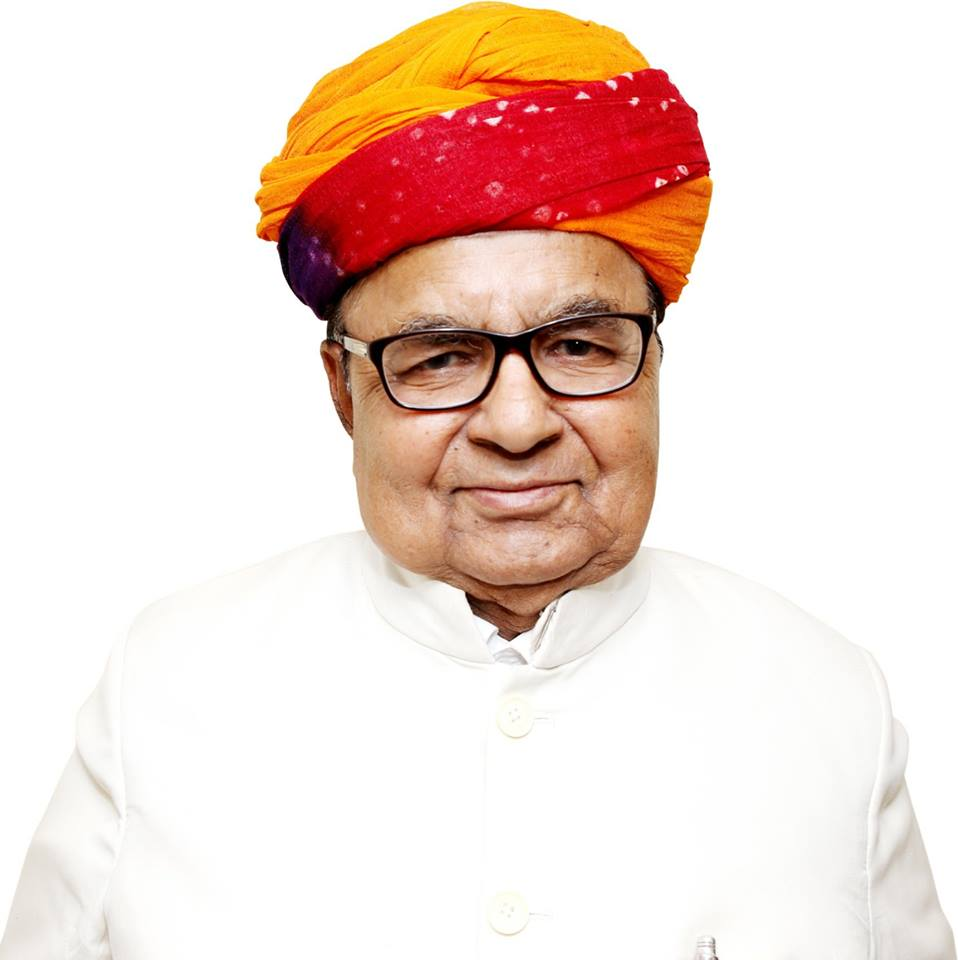

Parliamentary secretary, Government of Rajasthan
- In office 2014–2018

Chief Minister Monitoring Adviser, Govt of Rajasthan
- In office 2003 to 2008
- Chief minister: Vasundhara raje

Member of Rajasthan Legislative Assembly
- In office 2013–2018
- Preceded by: Hema Ram
- Succeeded by: Hema Ram
- Constituency: Gudamalani

Personal details
- Born: 20 December 1942 (age 83) Hemaguda, Jalore, Rajasthan
- Party: Bharatiya Janata Party
- Children: KK Vishnoi
- Education: Bachelor of Engineering (Electrical) 1965
- Alma mater: M.B.M. University, Jodhpur
- Occupation: Politician

Ladu Ram (born 20 December 1942) is an Indian politician from the Bharatiya Janata Party he was a member of the Rajasthan Legislative Assembly representing the Gudamalani Vidhan Sabha constituency of Rajasthan.
