= Doodhora =

Village in Rajasthan, India

Doodhora is a village in Sheo Tehsil of Barmer district, Rajasthan, India. In 2011, Doodhora contained 128 families. The population was 782, of which 466 were male and 316 were female.

== Notable people ==
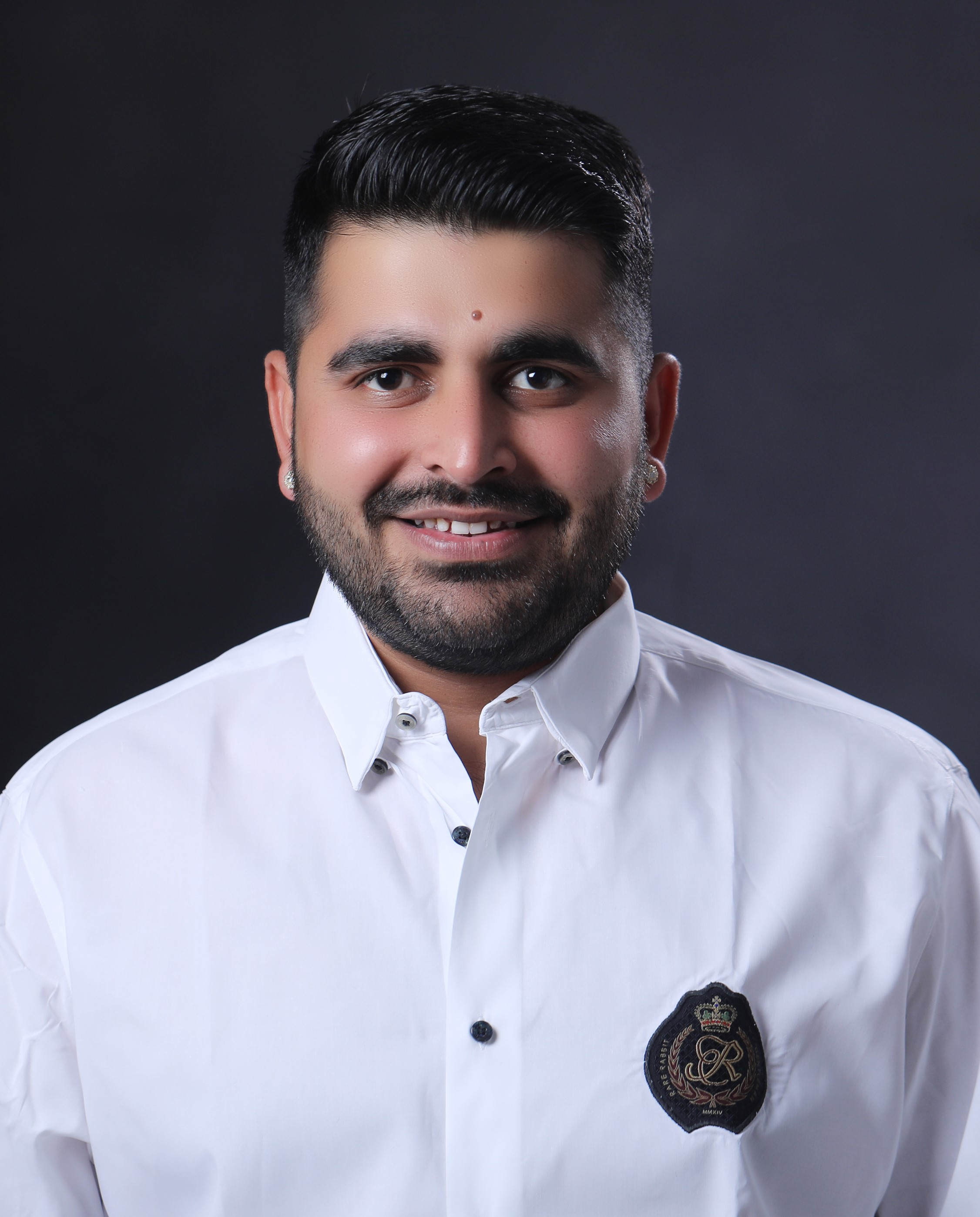
Ravindra Singh Bhati

- Ravindra Singh Bhati (BA, LLB), Member Of Rajasthan Legislative Assembly
