= Mokhawa =

Village in Barmer District, Rajasthan, India

- Village
- Country: India
- State: Rajasthan
- District: Barmer
- Tehsil: Gudamalani
- Gram Panchayat: Mokhawa Khurd

Area
  - Total: 2,523.02 ha (6,234.5 acres)

Population (2011)
  - Total: 2,488
  - Density: 98.61/km^{2} (255.4/sq mi)
- Time zone: UTC+5:30 (IST)
- PIN: 344031
- ISO 3166 code: RJ-IN
- Vehicle registration: RJ-04

Mokhawa is a village located in Gudamalani tehsil of Barmer district, Rajasthan, India.

== Details ==
According to the 2011 Census, the population of this village was 2,488, of which the male population was 1,296 while the female population was 1,192.

One resident of this village, producer and actress Sohani Kumari, has recently produced a film, Aakhir Palaayan Kab Tak.
