= Uttarlai Air Force Station =

- IATA: none; ICAO: VIUT

Summary
- Airport type: Military
- Operator: Indian Air Force
- Location: Uttarlai, Barmer, Rajasthan
- Elevation AMSL: 500 ft / 152 m
- Coordinates: 25°48′46″N 071°28′56″E
- Interactive map of Uttarlai Air Force Station

Runways
Direction	Length		Surface
Direction	m	ft	Surface
02/20	2,744	9,002	Concrete
- Source: ourairports.com

Uttarlai Air Force Station (ICAO: VIUT) of the Indian Air Force (IAF) is located in Uttarlai in Barmer, Rajasthan, India.

== History ==
Notable advantages of this Air Force Station during India 1971 war was that this airfield had been developed into a forward airfield and could remain best suitable for all sorts of strike purposes. It facilitated easy operation of HF-24 Maruts, Gnats, Hunters and MiGs.

== Facilities ==
The airport is situated at an elevation of 450 ft (140 m) above mean sea level. It has one runway with concrete surfaces: 02/20 measuring 9,002 by 150 ft (2,744 by 46 m).

== Civil Flights Planning ==
The Government of Rajasthan is working to make this civil enclave operational soon to benefit the people of Barmer and outsiders working in petro refinery project of HPCL. Till the airport becomes functional, flights will operate from Air force field.
