= Kathari =

Village in Rajasthan, India

- Location within Rajasthan
- Coordinates: 25.5272222°N 072.5194444°E
- Country: India
- State: Rajasthan
- Province: Barmer District
- Time zone: UTC+05:30 (IST)

Kathari is a village in Balotra District in the Indian state of Rajasthan.

Kathari is 116.3 kilometres (72.3 mi) from Barmer, the main city of its district, and 364 kilometres (226 mi) from Jaipur, the state capital. Historically, the village was in the Malani Kingdom and ruled by the independent Mahecha clan of Rathore Rajputs and Sisodiya Rajput.
