= Ravindra Singh Bhati =

Indian politician (born 1997)

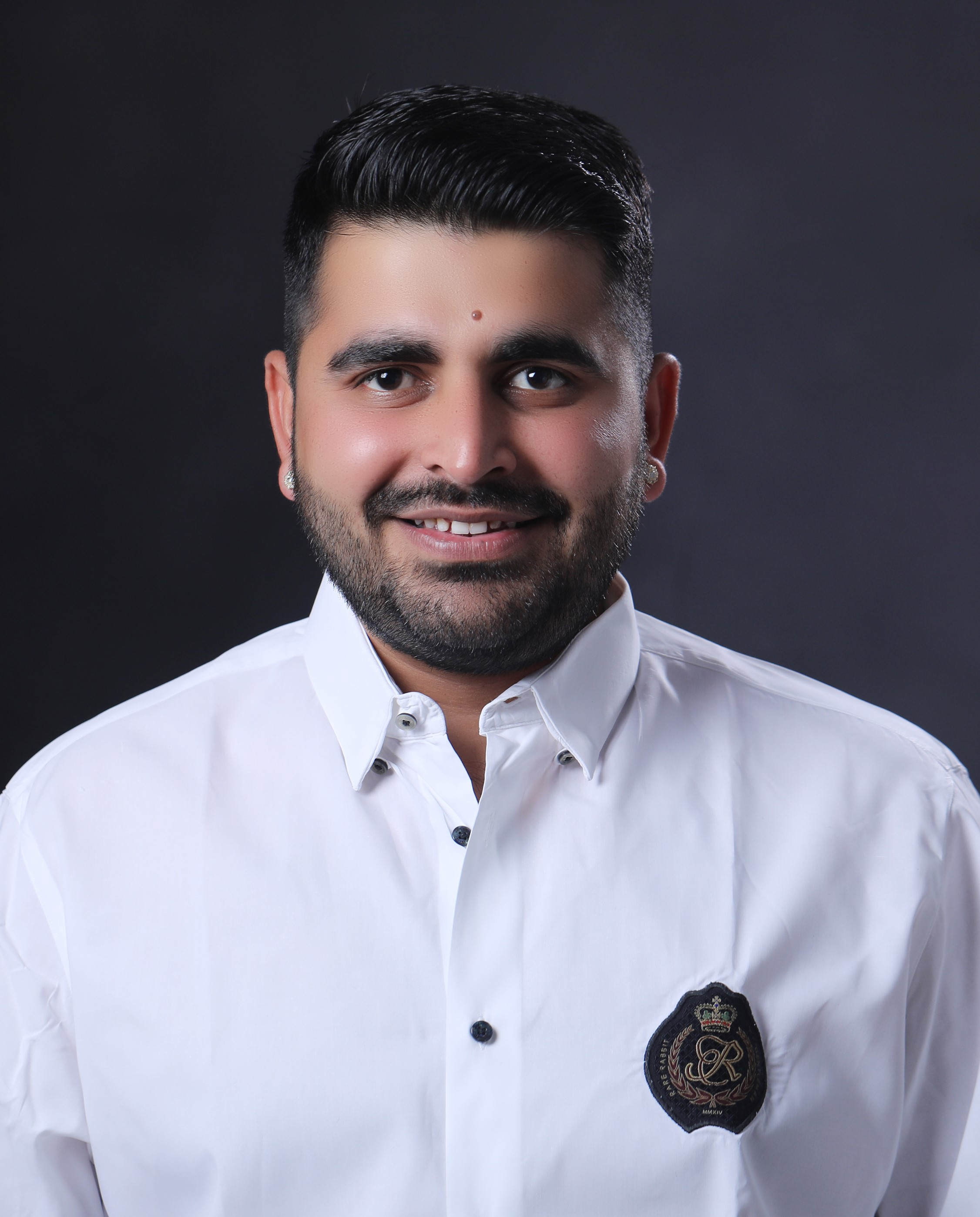
- Bhati in 2024

Member of Rajasthan Legislative Assembly
- Incumbent
- Assumed office 3 December 2023
- Preceded by: Ameen Khan
- Constituency: Sheo

President of Jai Narain Vyas University Student Union
- In office 2019–2022

Personal details
- Born: 3 December 1997 (age 28) Doodhora, Barmer, Rajasthan, India
- Party: Independent
- Other political affiliations: Bharatiya Janata Party (October 2023 to November 2023)
- Spouse: Dhanistha Kanwar
- Children: 2
- Education: Jai Narain Vyas University (BA), (LLB)
- Occupation: Politician
- Nickname: Rav Sa

Ravindra Singh Bhati (born 3 December 1997) is an Indian politician serving as a member of the Rajasthan Legislative Assembly from the Sheo Assembly constituency since 2023. He was the President of Jai Narain Vyas University Student Union from 2019 to 2022.

== Early life and education ==
Bhati was born on 3 December 1997 in a Rajput family of Doodhora village in Barmer district, Rajasthan. His father, Shaitan Singh Bhati, is a school teacher and his mother, Ashok Kanwar, is a homemaker. He completed his Bachelor of Arts (BA) and Bachelor of Laws (LLB) from Jai Narain Vyas University, Jodhpur.

- Doctorate (Honorary)

On February 14, 2025, he was awarded an honorary doctorate degree by Desh Bhagat University (DBU) in Punjab.

== Political career ==
=== Student politics ===
Bhati initiated his political journey through student politics at JNVU. Following ABVP's refusal of ticket, he contested independently, securing victory as the inaugural independent student union president in JNVU's 57-year history. During his tenure, he prioritized numerous student concerns, including addressing fee issues amid the challenging COVID-19 pandemic, he had been jailed multiple times for that.

=== Mainstream Indian politics ===
Subsequently, recognized for his popularity, he joined the BJP under BJP Rajasthan's top leadership. However, he was denied ticket from the Sheo constituency, he contested independently and won, marking the first independent win in his constituency's history. He attained the distinction of becoming the youngest MLA in the 2023 Rajasthan Legislative Assembly elections on his 26th birthday on 3 December 2023, alongside Anshuman Singh Bhati.

In the 2024 Indian general elections he was defeated by INC's Ummeda Ram Beniwal from Barmer Lok Sabha.

In December 2025, he warned that the proposed 100-metre mining norm could severely impact the Aravalli region.

== Electoral record ==
Year	Office	Constituency	Party	Votes (Ravindra Singh Bhati)	%	Opponent	Opponent Party	Votes	%	Result	Ref
2024	MP	Barmer	IND	586,500	34.74	Ummeda Ram Beniwal	Indian National Congress	704,676	41.74	Lost	
2023	MLA	Sheo	IND	79,495	31.44	Fateh Khan	IND	75,545	29.87	Won	
