= Chandrai (Barmer) =

- village
- Country: India
- State: Rajasthan
- District: Barmer

Population
  - Total: 855

Languages
  - Official: Hindi
- Time zone: UTC+5:30 (IST)
- ISO 3166 code: RJ-IN
- Vehicle registration: RJ-
- Coastline: 0 kilometres (0 mi)

Chandrai is a village in Pachpadra block of the Barmer district of Rajasthan, India. Chandrai's population is around 855.
