= Gangaram Choudhary =

Indian politician (1922–2014)

Member of the Rajasthan Legislative Assembly
- In office 1962 - 1980
- In office 1985 - 1998
- In office 2003 - 2008

Cabinet Minister Government of Rajasthan
- In office 5 September 1967 - 9 July 1971
- In office 25 November 1990 - 14 December 1992
- In office 13 December 1993 - 28 August 1998

Personal details
- Born: 1 March 1922 Kharin, Barmer, Rajasthan
- Died: 26 March 2014 (aged 92) Jodhpur, Rajasthan
- Party: Bharatiya Janata Party (2003-death)
- Other political affiliations: Indian National Congress (1953-1984 and 1998-2003); Lokdal (1984-1989); Janata Dal (1989-1993)
- Relations: Priyanka Chaudhary (grand-daughter)

Gangaram Choudhary (1 March 1922 - 26 March 2014) was a veteran Indian politician, social worker and a farmer leader. He served as a cabinet minister in revenue department in Government of Rajasthan for three terms. He was elected to the Rajasthan Legislative Assembly for eight terms between 1962 and 2008.

== Biography ==
Chaudhary was born on 1 March 1922 in Barmer, Rajasthan. Chaudhary bagan his political career in 1953 with Indian National Congress and became president of Jila Sahkar Sangh of Barmer. Chaudhary contested the 1962 Rajasthan Legislative Assembly election and won from Gudha-Malani constituency. In his political career spanning more than forty years, Chaudhary was elected to the Rajasthan Assembly for eight terms between 1962 and 2008.

Chaudhary also became cabinet minister in Government of Rajasthan for three terms. He became cabinet minister in department of revenue in Government of Rajasthan for first term from 5 September 1967 - 9 July 1971 and then for second term from 25 November 1990 to 14 December 1992 and then later for third term from 13 December 1993 to 28 August 1998.

Choudhary was associated with multiple political parties. He started with the Indian National Congress, later joined Lokdal and Janata Dal, and eventually became a member of the Bharatiya Janata Party. Choudhary died on March 26, 2014, due to age-related health issues at the age of 92.
