= Vankal Mata Temple =

- विरात्रा वांकल माता मंदिर
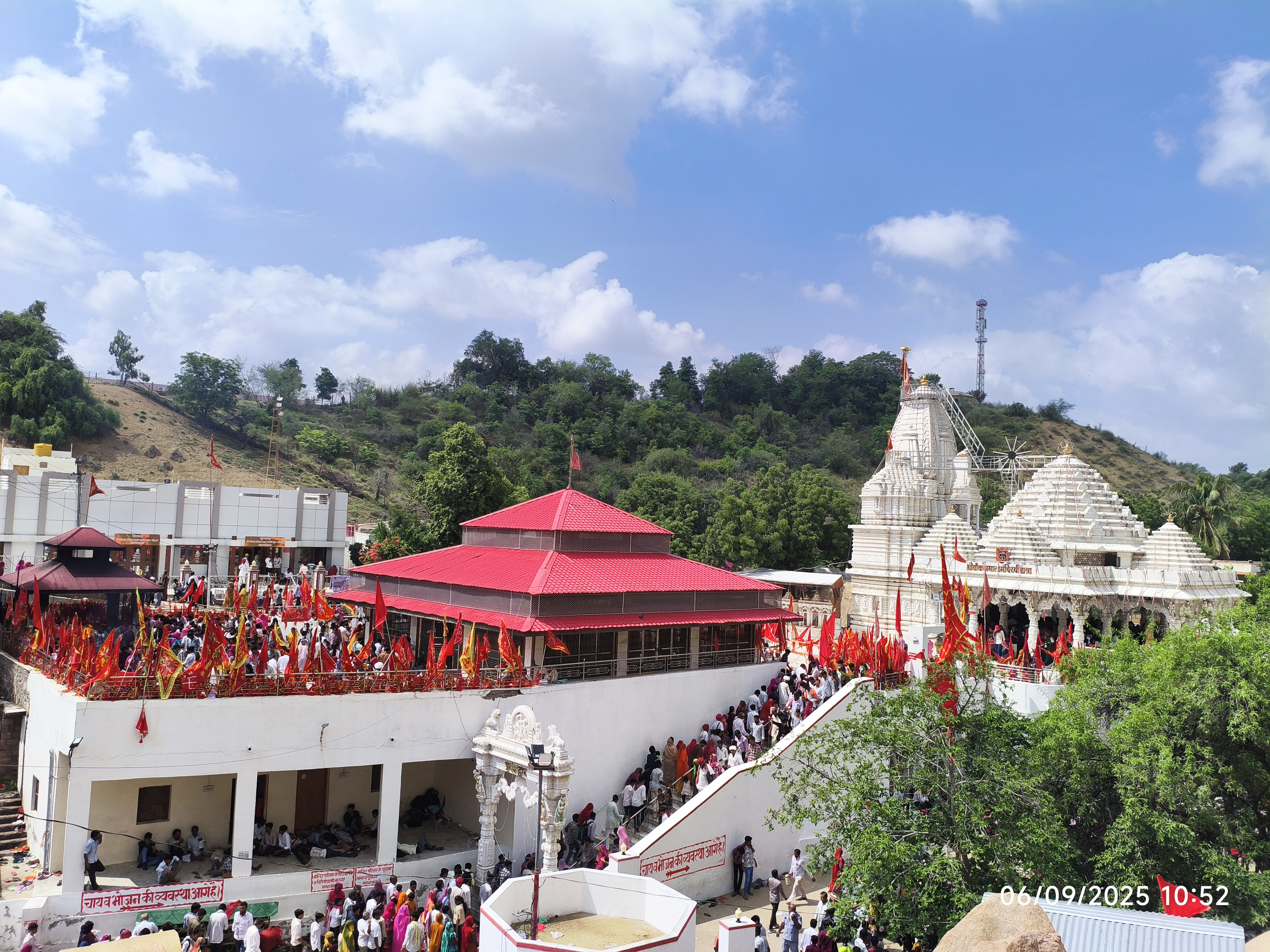
- Viratra Mata temple

- Location in Rajasthan Vankal Mata Temple (India)

Religion
- Affiliation: Hinduism
- District: Barmer
- Deity: Vankal mata (an aspect of goddess Durga)
- Festivals: Four Day Theerth Yatra in April, Navaratri

Location
- Location: Chohtan, Barmer
- State: Rajasthan
- Country: India
- Coordinates: 25.745°N 71.396°E

Architecture
- Completed: 2013

Vankal Mata Temple a 900-year-old temple of Mother goddess Vankal situated on a hilltop called Viratra, located in Barmer of Rajasthan.

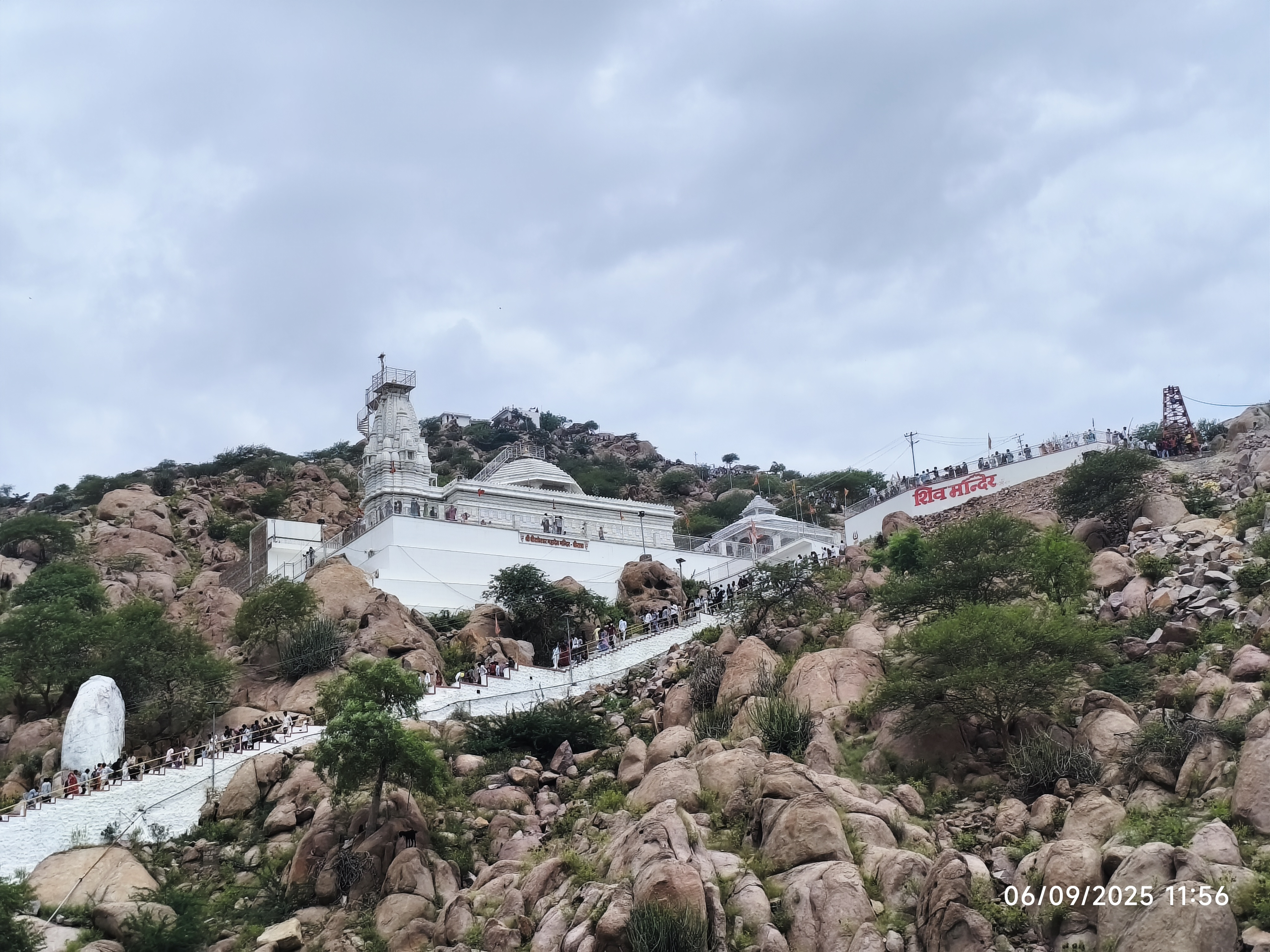
Shiva temple Viratra

== Temple history ==
The miracle of Viratra Vakal Mata Temple, located 55 kilometers away from Barmer, Rajasthan headquarters of Rajasthan, is such that devotees come to this temple of the mother goddess, not only from Barmer, but from all over the country.

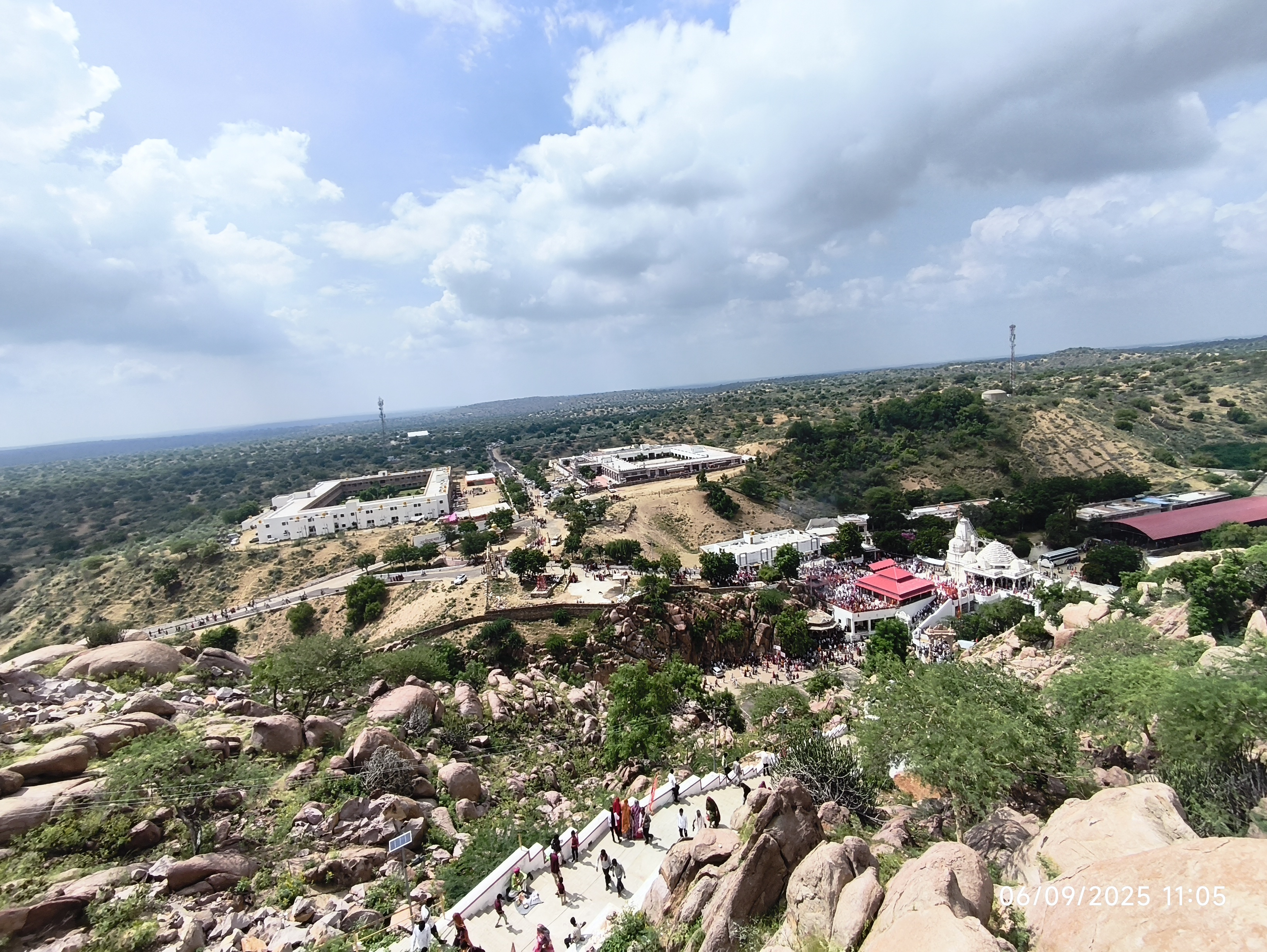
Aerial View viratra mata temple

King Vikramaditya of Ujjain prayed to the mother goddess to destroy the demons and after that he worshiped Hinglaj Mata mandir. He told the mother goddess that he wanted to take her with him. There, the mother told him that I cannot walk, but my Shaktipeeth can definitely walk, but if you look back then this Shaktipeeth will be established there. Meanwhile, King Vikramaditya rests for the night on the hills of Viratra and in the morning, looking back and looking in the west direction, it is predicted that this statue will not go ahead and from this day this statue was established here. Many such miracles are associated with this temple.

Grace of Hinglaj Mata Balochistan, Pakistanin Far WestIn the cave of Makran ranges in Bela region near Hinglaj is known as Maa. Hinglaj Mata has been most recognized in India that Viratra Mata has been associated with this Aadi Shakti Pitha.

Also, it is a belief that when Veer Vikramaditya went to Balochistan campaign, he prayed to Mata Hinglaj and said that if he takes Mata with him to Ujjain to worship on the night of victory, then by the grace of Hinglaj Mata, he will win. The neck of the Goddess is crooked; the heroic Vikramaditya stopped at night, hence it was named Viratra and the temple of the Goddess was built on the top of this hill. Devotees had difficulty in climbing this mountain, so on the prayer of the devotees, the idol of Viratra Mata came down and a new temple was built there. Due to the crooked neck of the goddess, she was named Vankal Mata Viratra.

Devotees from different regions of India come here for darshan. Even today, those who are not able to go to Balochistan Hinglaj Mata in Pakistan. Those devotees reach this temple with their wishes and worship the mother.
