= Umed Singh =

Umed Singh may refer to:

- Umed Singh (Rajasthan politician) (1936–2006), member of the Rajasthan Legislative Assembly
- Umed Singh (Haryana politician), member of the Haryana Legislative Assembly
- Umed Singh II (1873–1940), ruler of the princely state of Kotah
- Umaid Singh (1903–1947), also spelled Umed Singh, Maharaja of Jodhpur State
