= Devnagar =

- Neighbourhood
- Location in Rajasthan Devnagar (India)
- Coordinates: 25.81°N 70.72°E
- Country: India
- State: Rajasthan
- Districts: Barmer

Devnagar is a village in Barmer District in the Indian state of Rajasthan.
