= Madan Kaur =

Indian politician (1935–2025)

Minister of Forest, Government of Rajasthan
- In office 1990–1992

Jila Pramukh, Barmer district
- In office 2005–2015

MLA
- In office 1967–1980
- Constituency: Pachpadra
- In office 1990–1995
- Constituency: Gudamalani

Personal details
- Born: 1935 Dhadhnia, Shergarh, Jodhpur
- Died: 5 August 2025 (aged 89–90)
- Party: Indian National Congress

Madan Kaur (1935 – 5 August 2025) was an Indian politician who served as Minister of Forest in Govt. of Rajasthan. She was a former Zila Pramukh from Barmer Zila Prishad and Ex-MLA from constituency Pachpadra. She was a leader of Indian National Congress.

Kaur died on 5 August 2025, at the age of 90.
