= Priyanka Chaudhary =

Indian politician

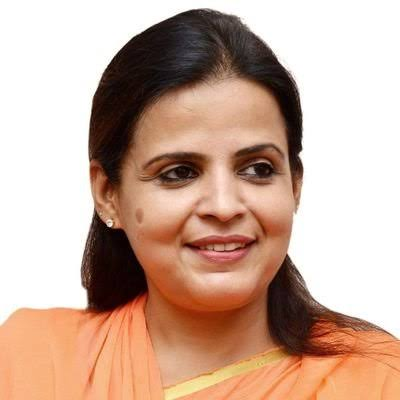

Member of the Rajasthan Legislative Assembly
- Incumbent
- Assumed office December 2023
- Preceded by: Mewaram Jain
- Constituency: Barmer

Personal details
- Born: 1973 (age 52–53) Barmer, Rajasthan
- Party: Bhartiya Janta Party
- Education: Master of Arts in (1996) and Dental degree in (2005)
- Alma mater: University of Rajasthan
- Profession: Doctor, Politician

Priyanka Chaudhary (born 1973) is an Indian politician and doctor from Barmer, Rajasthan. She was elected to the 16th Rajasthan Legislative Assembly from Barmer. She is the grand-daughter of Gangaram Choudhary, cabinet minister in Government of Rajasthan.

== Political career ==
In the 2023 Rajasthan Legislative Assembly elections Chaudhary defeated Mewaram Jain of Indian National Congress by securing 105420 votes.

Before 2023 Assembly elections Chaudhary was a member of Bhartiya Janta Party but the party chose Deepak Karwasara as candidate while Chaudhary nominated as Independent candidate and won the elections.

== Education ==
Chaudhary's educational qualifications are Master of Arts in Public Administration from University of Rajasthan in 1996 and then Dental Degree (B.D.S.) from University of Rajasthan in 2005.
