= Garal =

- village
- Location in Rajasthan, India Garal (India)
- Coordinates: 25°34′33.66″N 71°29′1.56″E
- Country: India
- State: Rajasthan

Languages
  - Official: Hindi
- Time zone: UTC+5:30 (IST)
- ISO 3166 code: RJ-IN

Garal is a small village located 23 km south of Barmer, Rajasthan, India.
