= Kekar =

Village in Rajasthan, India

Kekar is a village in the Barmer district of Rajasthan state of India. The distance from the district headquarters is 95 km.
