= KK Vishnoi =

Indian politician

Krishan Kumar Vishnoi
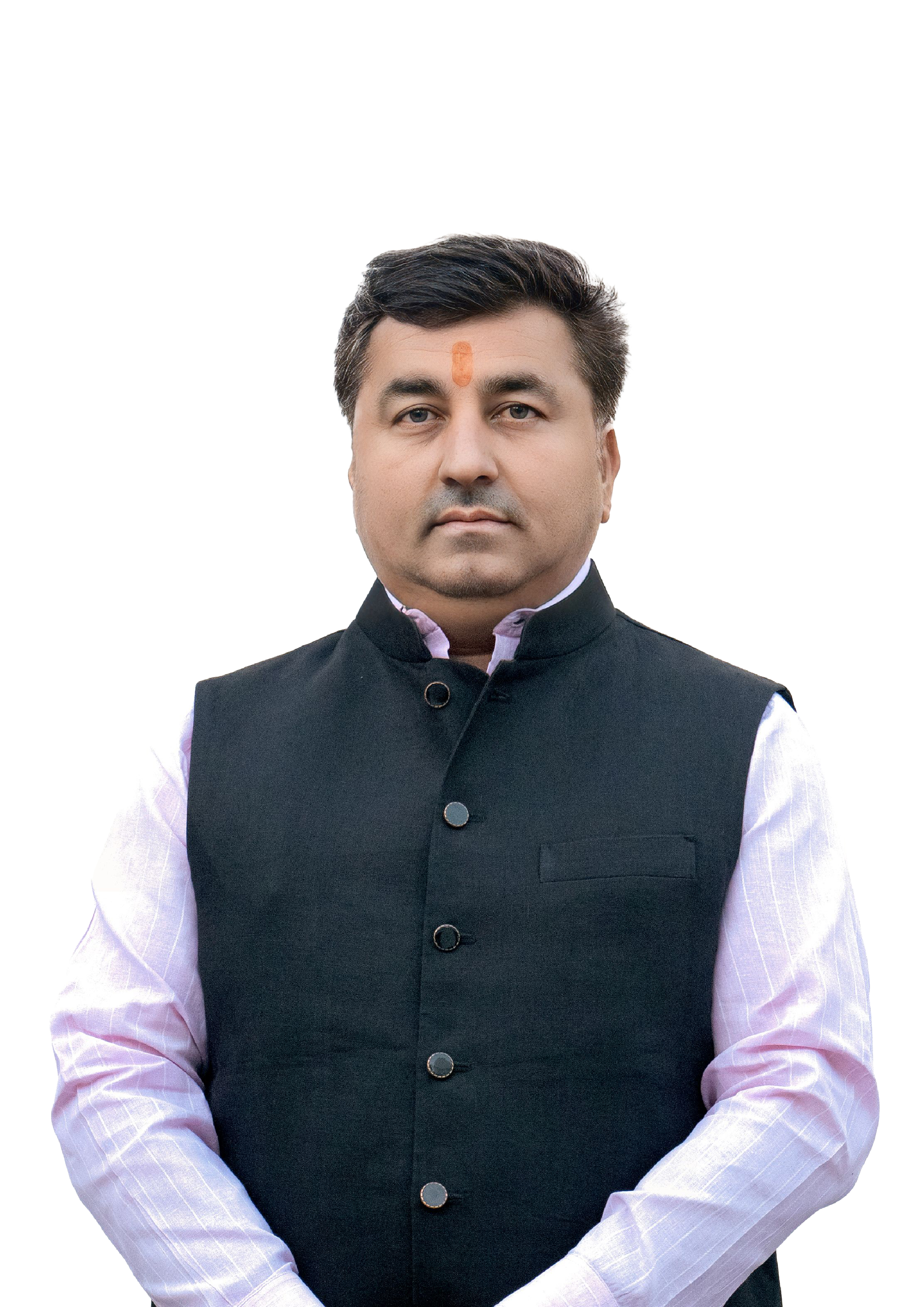
- K.K. Vishnoi

Minister of State, Government of Rajasthan
- Incumbent
- Assumed office 30 December 2023
- Governor: Haribhau Kisanrao Bagde
- Chief Minister: Bhajan Lal Sharma
- Ministry and Departments: List: Industry & Commerce; Sports & Youth Affairs; Skill, Employment & Entrepreneurship; Policy Making
- Preceded by: Ashok Chandna

Member of the Rajasthan Legislative Assembly
- Incumbent
- Assumed office 3 December 2023
- Preceded by: Hemaram Choudhary
- Constituency: Gudamalani

State Secretary of Bharatiya Janata Party – Rajasthan
- In office 2020–2023

Personal details
- Born: 8 August 1976 (age 49)
- Party: Bharatiya Janata Party
- Parent: Ladu Ram (father)
- Education: B.A. from Marwad College, Kuchaman City (2021)
- Alma mater: Maharshi Dayanand Saraswati University, Ajmer
- Occupation: Politician

Krishan Kumar "KK" Vishnoi (born 18 August 1976) is an Indian politician from the Bharatiya Janata Party (BJP) who is serving as a Minister of State in the Government of Rajasthan. He represents the Gudha Malani constituency in the Rajasthan Legislative Assembly.

== Early life and education ==
Vishnoi obtained a Bachelor of Arts degree from Marwad College, Kuchaman City, affiliated with Maharshi Dayanand Saraswati University, Ajmer, in 2021.

== Political career ==
Vishnoi has been associated with the Bharatiya Janata Party in Rajasthan and served as the State Secretary of the party's Rajasthan unit from 2020 to 2023.

In the 2023 Rajasthan Legislative Assembly election, he contested the Gudha Malani seat as a BJP candidate. He was elected as a Member of the Legislative Assembly, defeating Congress candidate Sonaram Choudhary by a margin of 15,217 votes.

=== Minister ===
Vishnoi was inducted into the Bhajan Lal Sharma ministry on 30 December 2023 as a Minister of State with independent charge of the departments of Industry & Commerce, Sports & Youth Affairs, Skill, Employment & Entrepreneurship, and Policy Making. In May 2024, he was additionally assigned the Agriculture portfolio.

== Electoral record ==
Election results
Year	Office	Constituency	Party	Votes (KK Vishnoi)	%	Opponent	Opponent Party	Votes	%	Result	Ref
2023	MLA	Gudha Malani	Bharatiya Janata Party	107,632	48.85	Sonaram Choudhary	Indian National Congress	92,415	41.95	Won	
