= Mewaram Jain =

Indian politician

Member of Rajasthan Legislative Assembly
- In office 2008–2023
- Preceded by: Taga Ram
- Succeeded by: Priyanka Chowdhary
- Constituency: Barmer

Personal details
- Born: 7 June 1953 (age 73) Balewa, Harsani Barmer, Rajasthan
- Party: Indian National Congress
- Spouse: Dhai Devi
- Occupation: Politician

Mewaram Chintamandas Jain (born 7 June 1953) is an Indian politician. He has served as a member of the Rajasthan Legislative Assembly from 2008 to 2023 representing the Barmer. He is a member of the Indian National Congress. Jain was the main defendant in the 2023 Barmer rape case and child abuse and booked under the POCSO Act.

== Criminal cases ==
Jodhpur Police registered a case against nine people including former Barmer MLA Mewaram Jain. Mewaram and his associates were accused of raping a woman and her minor daughter. The remaining 7 people were accused of supporting those two accused. Two viral social media videos show Mewaram Jain engaging in obscene acts with a woman, who herself captured the video. Jain enters the room, talks, drinks water, and indulges in the act.
