= Derasar, Rajasthan =

Derasar
- Location in Rajasthan, India Derasar (India)
- Coordinates: 25°47′59″N 71°09′53″E
- Country: India
- State: Rajasthan
- Division: Jodhpur division
- District: Barmer
- Tehsil: Ramsar

Population
  - Total: c. 600

Language
  - Official: Hindi
- Time zone: UTC+5:30 (IST)

Derasar is a village in the Barmer district of Rajasthan, near the border of India and Pakistan. Derasar lies within the Thar Desert, which influences the lives of the residents; taankas are used to collect water and husbands have two wives, one of whom devotes herself to collecting water from a nearby water source five kilometres away from the village. The culture of Derasar reflects that of the region of Rajputana within the Indian subcontinent, such as the wearing of the angarkha.

== Demographics and geography ==
The population of Derasar consists about 600 persons, including 70 Muslim families.

Derasar lies within the arid Thar Desert and for eleven months of the year, water is scarce. As such, rainwater is collected in taankas which "have a catchment area to collect rainwater which is then stored underground". The nearest water source to the village is five kilometers away, requiring residents to walk at lengths to retrieve it. In recent times, men have had to find work in larger cities leaving the women to tend to the crops. The International Crops Research Institute for the Semi-Arid Tropics has provided fruit trees to Derasar, in addition to knowledge on which crops would be successful in the dry region. Crops that are grown in Derasar include "pearl millet, cluster bean, green gram, moth bean, sesame and watermelons".

Derasar has communal grazing pastures that provide nutrition for the residents' livestock.

== Culture ==
The culture of Derasar is centered around the historic customs of the South Asian region of Rajputana. Men wear a tradition Indian garment known as an angarkha, along with scarves and jewellery.

With respect to marriage customs, teenagers do not date but have their marriages arranged or alternatively, choose celibacy.

Unique to the culture of Derasar is the practice of polygamy, in which it is normative for men to have two wives. The husband's first child is usually from the first wife, with the second wife bearing a child later. The reason for this custom is said to be practical: with the nearest water source being five kilometres away, the first wife is tasked with fetching water as Derasar locals believe that it would be quite difficult for a pregnant woman to accomplish this.
