= Dhanau =

Tehsil in Rajasthan, India

- Tehsil
- Location in Rajasthan, India Dhanau (India)
- Coordinates: 25°14′20″N 71°08′06″E
- Country: India
- State: Rajasthan
- District: Barmer district

Government
  - Type: Democratic
- Elevation: 134 m (440 ft)

Population (2011)
  - Total: 2,837

Languages
  - Official: Hindi
- Time zone: UTC+5:30 (IST)
- Vehicle registration: Rj 04
- Nearest city: Barmer, Balotra

Dhanau is a village and Tehsil and block headquarters of Barmer district in Rajasthan, northern India. The current Sarpanch of Dhanau is Fagluram Pawad, who is actively involved in local administration and public welfare.

== Pattu Weaving ==
Dhanau is renowned for its traditional handloom craft known as Pattu weaving. This intricate textile art is primarily practiced by the Meghwal community and holds significant cultural and historical importance in the region.

Pattu textiles are traditionally woven on pit looms using wool sourced from local sheep and camels. The weaving process involves creating narrow strips of fabric, which are later stitched together. Distinctive patterns are achieved through techniques like extra-weft weaving, resulting in geometric motifs that often depict elements from nature and local life, such as huts (burdi), birds (chidia), and fish (machli). Communities like the Meghwal are experts in making different Pattu designs, such as Hiravali Pattu and Baladi Check. These warm, colorful shawls are worn by both men and women and are essential garments in rural Rajasthan during the winter months.

Historically, Pattu shawls have been integral to the social and cultural fabric of western Rajasthan. They are commonly used during weddings and other significant ceremonies, symbolizing respect and tradition. Different styles of Pattu, such as Hiravalli and Baladi check, are worn by various age groups and genders, reflecting the rich diversity within the craft.

In recent years, efforts have been made to revive and sustain Pattu weaving in Dhanau aiming to preserve the cultural heritage of Pattu weaving while providing stable employment for local artisans.
