= Sheo =

Sheov Shiv, She
- Tehsil (headquarters)
- Sheo
- Nickname: Shiv
- Location in Rajasthan, India Sheov (India)
- Coordinates: 26°10′59″N 71°15′0″E
- Country: India
- State: Rajasthan
- District: Barmer
- Founder: Rajpurohit

Government
  - Type: Democratic
  - Body: Congress
- Elevation: 233 m (764 ft)

Population (2021)
  - Total: 50,000

Languages
  - Official: Hindi
  - Regional: Dhatki, Sindhi, Marwari
- Time zone: UTC+5:30 (IST)
- PIN: 344701
- ISO 3166 code: RJ-IN
- Vehicle registration: RJ-04
- Nearest city: Barmer, Rajasthan
- Lok Sabha constituency: Barmer (Lok Sabha constituency)

Sheo or Shiv is a village and tehsil headquarters of Sheo tehsil in Barmer district of Rajasthan state of India. It is also spelled as Shiv, although Sheo is the preferred way of writing the name. The village is located in the Thar Desert.

Rajput, Mali, Raj purohit and Muslim dominated this village. It has an important contribution in the politics of Rajasthan, province of India. Jaswant Singh Jasol, father of the politician of the Sheo region, Manvendra Singh, has made an important contribution to the politics of India. The current Sheo MLA is Ravindra Singh Bhati and first independent win in constituency's history.It is famous for its variety of cuisines, music, culture and ethnicity.

== Demographics ==
Population of Sheo according to the census 2001 is, 5689. Where Male population is 4,311, while female population is 1,677. Population of Sheo according to the census 2010 is 10,000 approx.
