= Chohtan =

- Tehsil Municipality
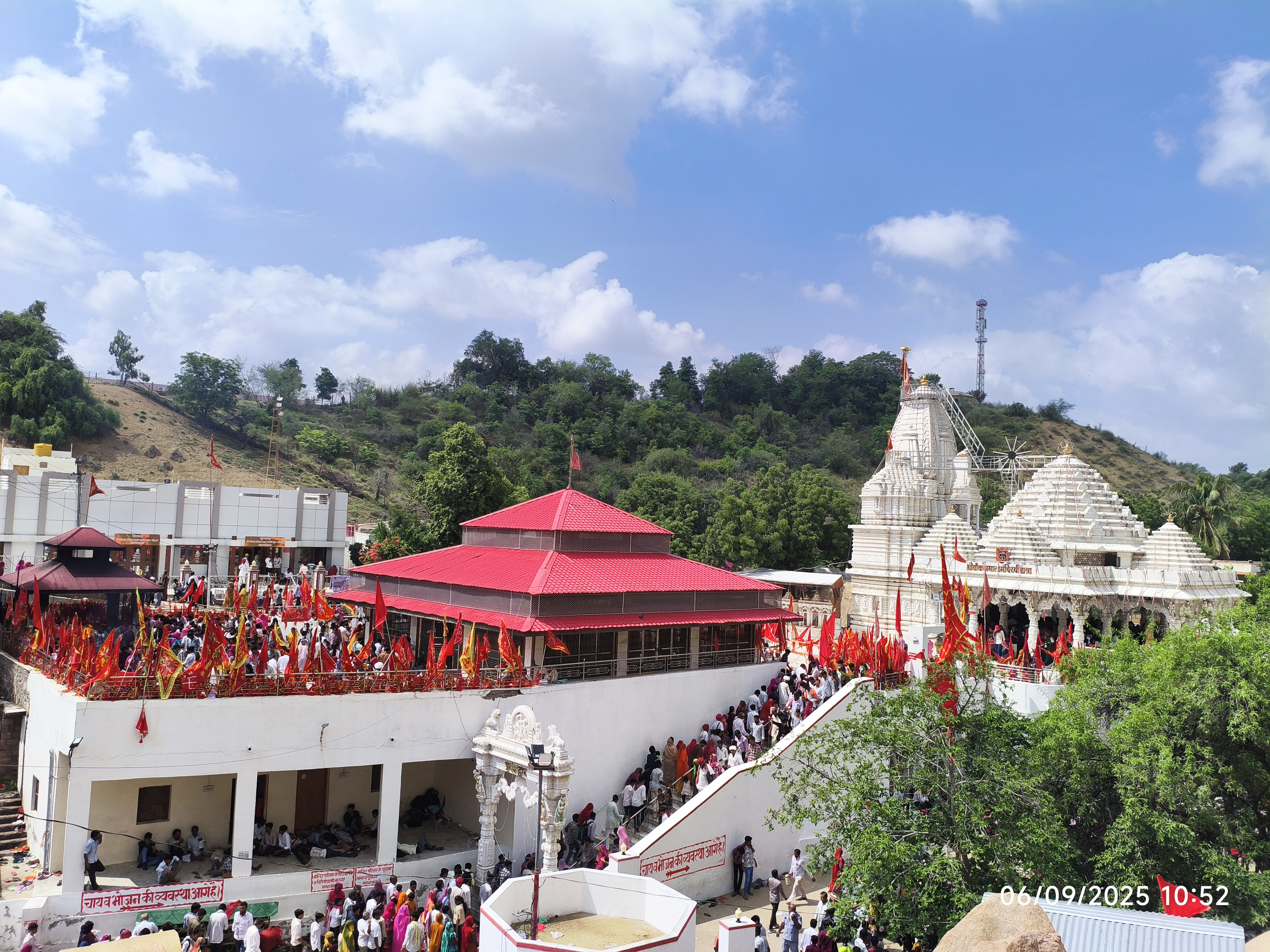
- Viratra Vankal Mata Temple in Cohtan, Barmer

- Location in Rajasthan, India Chohtan (India)
- Coordinates: 25°28′59″N 71°04′0″E
- Country: India
- State: Rajasthan
- District: Barmer

Government
  - Type: Municipality
  - Body: Municipality
- Elevation: 178 m (584 ft)

Languages
  - Official: Hindi
  - Regional: Rajasthani, Marwadi, Sindhi, Dhatki
- Time zone: UTC+5:30 (IST)
- PIN: 344 702
- Telephone code: 02989
- Vehicle registration: RJ-04
- Nearest city: Barmer
- Literacy: 63.41 % Male-75.06% Female-50.29%
- Lok Sabha constituency: Barmer-Jaisalmer
- Climate: dry (Köppen)

Chohtan is a Municipality and tehsil headquarters in Barmer district of Rajasthan state. There are several temples in the area, including Viratra(Vankal), Deri Dungar, Sunya Temple, Kapaleshwar, Krishna Temple, Verthan.

== Geography ==
Chohtan is surrounded by hills in the west and north and by desert in the east and south. The village is located approximately 48 km from district headquarters Barmer. They are connected via road. Its location near the border with Pakistan makes it a place of strategic importance. Festivals and other events are celebrated by people. People here are very religious. There are temples, some of them are Jain temple, Viratra Mata Tample, Verthan temple and Shiva temple. In ancient time Chohtan is known as Pandva's Tapo Bhoomi because they resided there.

In the rainy season, natural ponds emerge and water falls can be visited by tourists. From Chohtan there are regular bus service between all major cities like Jaipur, Jodhpur, Jaisalmer, Ajmer, Ahmedabad, Mumbai and Surat.

== Demographics ==
According to the Indian Census 2011, the population of Chohtan tehsil is 2,03,797. The population of Chohtan village is 12, 465 where male constitutes 6,603 and female constitutes 5,862.

=== Languages ===
Languages of Chohtan tehsil (2011)
1. Marwari (60.8%)
2. Rajasthani (22.6%)
3. Sindhi (15.3%)
4. Others (1.38%)

At the time of the 2011 census, 60.76% of the population in Chohtan tehsil spoke Marwari, 22.56% Rajasthani, 15.30% Sindhi and 1.38% spoke the rest. People in the west of the tehsil along the border with Pakistan speak Dhatki, a mix of Marwari and Sindhi.
