= Jalam Singh Rawlot =

Indian politician

Personal details
- Born: Sato Jaisalmer, Rajasthan
- Party: Bharatiya Janata Party

Jalam Singh Rawlot is an Indian politician who is a former MLA of Sheo (Rajasthan Assembly constituency). He is a former district president of Bharatiya Janata Party Barmer. He is a national level leader of the Bharatiya Janata Party. He was born in Satto village of Jaisalmer district. He was the student union president of Jai Narayan vyas University, Jodhpur in 1989.
