= Hemaram Choudhary =

Indian politician (born 1948)

Minister of Forest, Environment and Climate Change, Government of Rajasthan
- In office 21 November 2021 – December 2023
- Chief Minister: Ashok Gehlot
- Preceded by: Sukhram Bishnoi
- Succeeded by: Sanjay Sharma

Member of Rajasthan Legislative Assembly
- In office 1980-1990, 1998-2013, 2018 – 2023
- Constituency: Gudamalani

Leader of opposition in Rajasthan Legislative Assembly
- In office 23 December 2007 - 10 December 2008
- Chief Minister: Vasundhara Raje
- Preceded by: Ram Narayan Chaudhary
- Succeeded by: Vasundhara Raje

Minister of Revenue, Government of Rajasthan
- In office 2008–2013
- Chief Minister: Ashok Gehlot

Personal details
- Born: 18 January 1948 (age 78) Baytu, Barmer, Rajasthan
- Party: Indian National Congress
- Education: B.Com & Bachelor of Laws
- Nickname: Marwad's Gandhi

Hemaram Chaudhary (born 18 January 1948) is a senior leader belonging to the Indian National Congress. He served as minister of revenue in the Government of Rajasthan between 2008 and 2013. Previously served as Leader of Opposition during 2007 to 2008. He also served as the cabinet minister of Forest, Environment and Climate change in Government of Rajasthan. He was elected to the Rajasthan Legislative Assembly for six terms from Gudha malani constituency.

== Early life and education ==
Chaudhary was born on 18 January 1948 in Baytoo tehsil in Barmer district of Rajasthan in a Hindu Jat family. He did Bachelor of Commerce in 1970 and then he did Bachelor of Laws in 1973 from Jodhpur University.

== Political career ==
Chaudhary is a member of Indian National Congress party since 1980 elections and he is known for raising the voice of farmers in assembly.

In 1980 he won the Rajasthan Assembly elections for the first time as a candidate of Indian National Congress. He got 46,132 votes and won by a margin of 11,120 votes.

In 1985 he won the Rajasthan Assembly elections for the second time as a candidate of Indian National Congress. He got 50,388 votes and won by a margin of 28,723 votes.

In 1998 he won the Rajasthan Assembly elections for the third time as a candidate of Indian National Congress. He got 98,268 votes and won by a margin of 52,537 votes.

In 2003 he won the Rajasthan Assembly elections for the fourth time as a candidate of Indian National Congress. He got 1,40,435 votes and won by a margin of 11,912 votes. He was Leader of Opposition in the house from 2007 to 2008.

In 2008 he won the Rajasthan Assembly elections for the fifth time as a candidate of Indian National Congress. He got 1,29,679 votes and won by a margin of 9277 votes. He served as Minister of Revenue in Government of Rajasthan from 2008 to 2023.

In 2018 he won the Rajasthan Assembly elections for the sixth time as a candidate of Indian National Congress. He got 1,88,979 votes and won by a margin of 13,564 votes. He served as Minister of Forest, Environment and Climate Change in Government of Rajasthan from 21 November 2021 to December 2023.

During 2023 Rajasthan Assembly elections Chaudhary refused to contest elections and appealed to the party to give opportunity to any young politician.

== Personal life ==
Hemaram married Bheekhi Devi in 1971, and they have two children. His son, Virendra Chaudhary, who was a professor, died on March 21, 2015, due to cancer. His daughter, Sunita Chaudhary, is an advocate. Hemaram and Sunita constructed a hostel named ‘Virendra Dham’ in memory of Virendra Chaudhary.
