= Sheo Assembly constituency =

Legislative Assembly constituency in Rajasthan State, India

Coordinates: 26.19°N 71.24°E

Sheo
- Constituency No. 134 for the Rajasthan Legislative Assembly

Constituency details
- Country: India
- Region: North India
- State: Rajasthan
- District: Barmer
- Lok Sabha constituency: Barmer
- Established: 1972
- Total electors: 300,843
- Reservation: None

Member of Legislative Assembly
- 16th Rajasthan Legislative Assembly
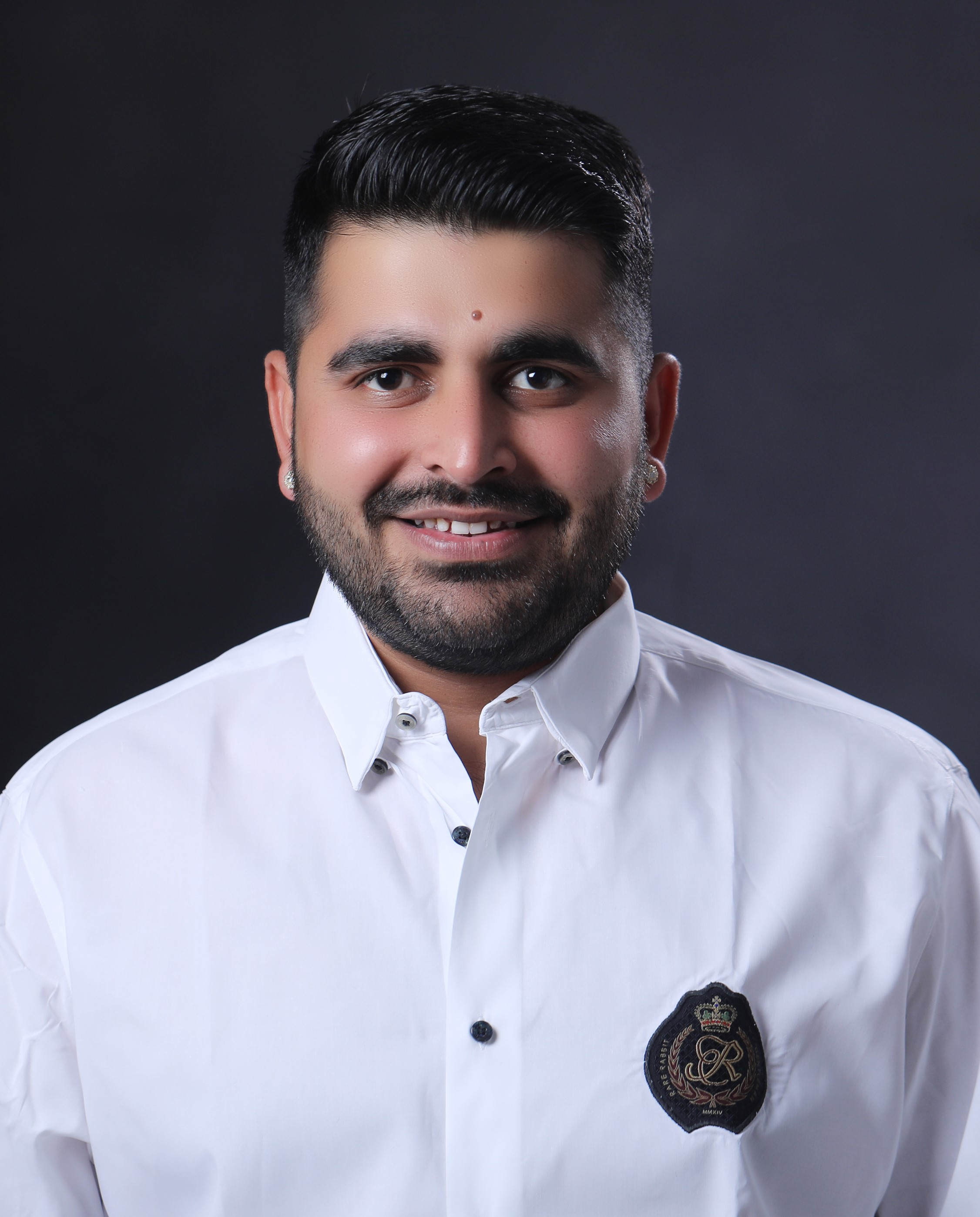
- Incumbent Ravindra Singh Bhati
- Party: Independent

Sheo Assembly constituency is one of the 200 Legislative Assembly constituencies of Rajasthan state in India. It is part of Barmer district.

== Members of the Legislative Assembly ==
Year	Member	Party
1972	Hukam Singh	Indian National Congress
1977	Kan Singh	Janata Party
1980	Ameen Khan	Indian National Congress
1985	Umed Singh	Janata Party
1990	Ameen Khan	Indian National Congress
1993	Hari Singh	Bharatiya Janata Party
1998	Ameen Khan	Indian National Congress
2003	Jalam Singh Rawlot	Bharatiya Janata Party
2008	Ameen Khan	Indian National Congress
2013	Manvendra Singh	Bharatiya Janata Party
2018	Ameen Khan	Indian National Congress
2023	Ravindra Singh Bhati	Independent politician

== Election results ==
=== 2023 ===
Rajasthan Legislative Assembly Election, 2023: Sheo
Party	Candidate	Votes	%	±%
Independent	Ravindra Singh Bhati	79,495	31.44	
Independent	Fateh Khan	75,545	29.87	
INC	Ameen Khan	55,264	21.85	−19.4
BJP	Swaroop Singh Khara	22,820	9.02	−20.71
RLP	Jalam Singh	7,345	2.9	−22.01
BTP	Sita	2,736	1.08	
Independent	Bhoora Ram	2,460	0.97	
NOTA	None of the above	3,120	1.23	−0.27
Majority		3,950	1.57	−9.95
Turnout		252,882	84.06	+3.61
Independent gain from INC		Swing		

=== 2018 ===
2018 Rajasthan Legislative Assembly election: Sheo
Party	Candidate	Votes	%	±%
INC	Ameen Khan	84,338	41.25	
BJP	Khangar Singh Sodha	60,784	29.73	
RLP	Udaram Meghwal	50,944	24.91	
BSP	Naranaram	3,316	1.62	
BSD	Toga Ram	2,035	1.0	
NOTA	None of the above	3,059	1.5	
Majority		23,554	11.52	
Turnout		204,476	80.45	

== See also ==
- List of constituencies of the Rajasthan Legislative Assembly
- Barmer district
