= Umed Singh (Rajasthan politician) =

Indian politician (1936–2006)

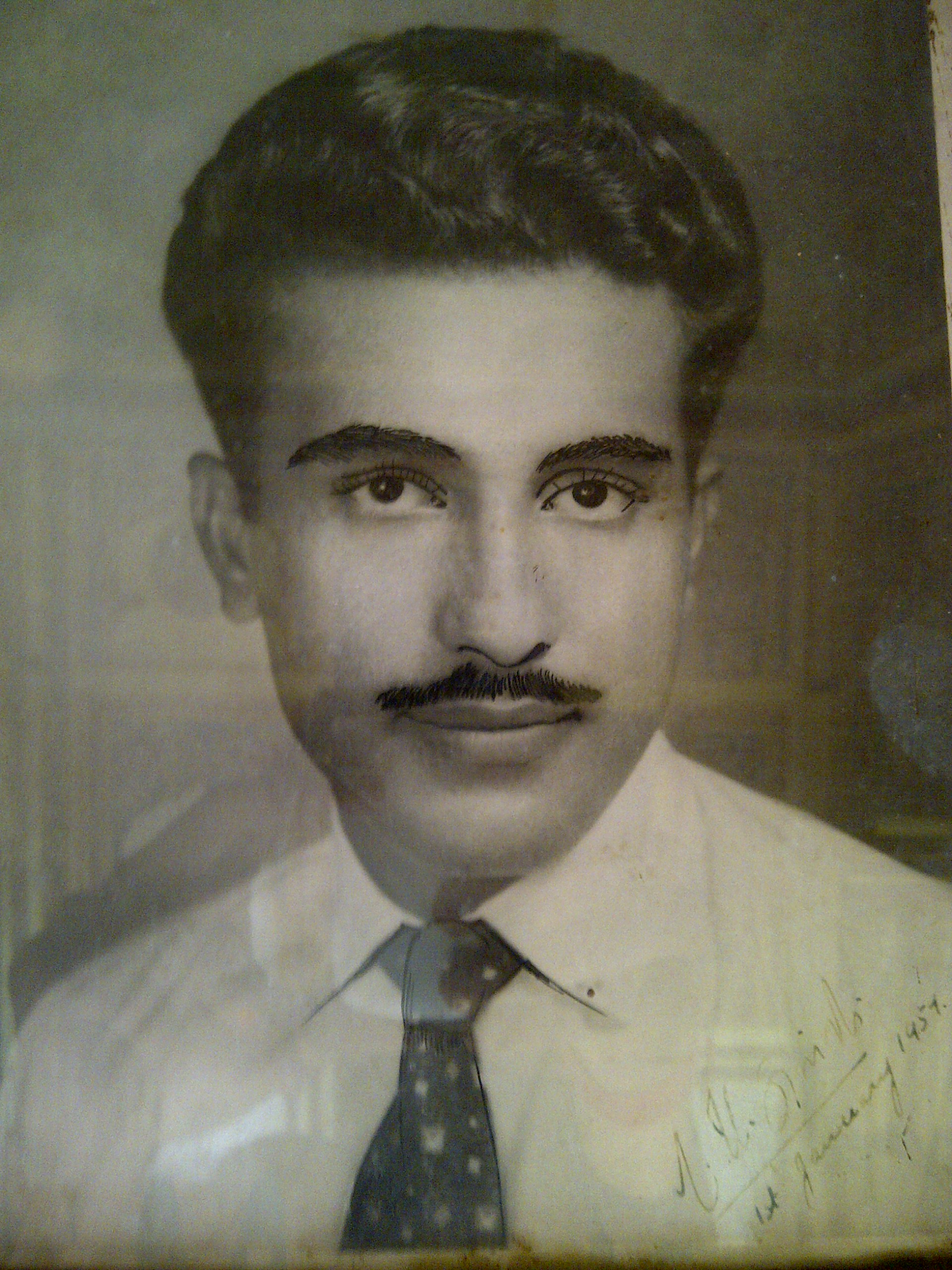
- Umed Singh

MLA
- Constituency: Barmer, Sheo, Didwana

Personal details
- Born: 5 October 1936 Barmer, India
- Died: 29 September 2006 (aged 69)

Umed Singh (5 October 1936 – 29 September 2006) was a politician from Rajasthan state, India.

Singh was elected for a first five-year term as Member of the Legislative Assembly (MLA) from Barmer district, Rajasthan, in 1962, on an Independent ticket. In 1980, he was elected for a second five-year term as MLA from Deedwana constituency on a Janata Party ticket. In 1985, he was elected for a third five-year term as MLA from Sheo constituency on a Janata Party ticket.
