= Barmer tehsil =

- tehsil
- Interactive map of Barmer tehsil
- Location in Rajasthan, India Barmer tehsil (India)
- Coordinates: 25°54′N 071°36′E
- Country: India
- State: Rajasthan
- District: Barmer
- Time zone: UTC+5:30 (IST)
- ISO 3166 code: RJ-IN
- Vehicle registration: RJ-
- Lok Sabha constituency: Barmer
- Vidhan Sabha constituency: Barmer

Barmer tehsil is a tehsil in Barmer District of Rajasthan state in western India. The tehsil headquarters is the city of Barmer.

== Demographics ==
In the 2001 census, Barmer tehsil had 286,922 inhabitants, with 154,590 males (53.9%) and 132,332 females (46.1%), for a gender ratio of 856 females per thousand males.

== Villages ==
There are fifty panchayat villages in Barmer tehsil.
