= Dhorimana =

- Municipality
- Nickname: Aalam Nagari
- Location in Rajasthan, India Dhorimana (India)
- Coordinates: 25°11′59″N 71°25′59″E
- Country: India
- State: Rajasthan
- District: Balotra

Government
  - Type: B.J.P
  - Body: Municipality
- Elevation: 102 m (335 ft)

Population (2011)
  - Total: 20,071
  - Density: 2,000/km^{2} (5,200/sq mi)

Languages
  - Official: Hindi
- Time zone: UTC+5:30 (IST)
- PIN: 344704
- ISO 3166 code: RJ-IN
- Vehicle registration: RJ-04
- Nearest city: Barmer
- Lok Sabha constituency: Barmer
- Climate: Extreme ( very hot in summers and very cold in winters) (Köppen)

Dhorimana is a town, and a municipality and tehsil in Balotra district in the Indian state of Rajasthan. The population according to the Indian Census 2011 is around 6,513. The male population is 3,391 and female population is 3,122. Dhorimana is located in the southern part of the Balotra district forming a part of the Thar Desert.
