= Uttarlai =

- Village
- Location in Rajasthan, India Uttarlai (India)
- Coordinates: 25°48′46″N 071°28′56″E
- Country: India
- State: Rajasthan
- District: Barmer

Government
  - Body: Gram Panchayat
- Elevation: 164 m (538 ft)

Population
  - Total: 2,039

Languages
  - Official: Hindi
- Time zone: UTC+5:30 (IST)
- ISO 3166 code: RJ-IN
- Vehicle registration: RJ-04
- Nearest city: Barmer
- Lok Sabha constituency: Barmer (Lok Sabha constituency)
- Civic agency: kurla Gram Panchayat

Uttarlai is a village in Barmer district of Rajasthan state of India. It also has an Air Force station nearby named after it.
