= Gudha Malani Assembly constituency =

Legislative Assembly constituency in Rajasthan State, India

Coordinates: 25.19°N 71.72°E

Gudamalani
- Constituency No. 139 for the Rajasthan Legislative Assembly

Constituency details
- Country: India
- Region: North India
- State: Rajasthan
- District: Barmer
- Lok Sabha constituency: Barmer
- Established: 1957
- Total electors: 270,134
- Reservation: None

Member of Legislative Assembly
- 16th Rajasthan Legislative Assembly
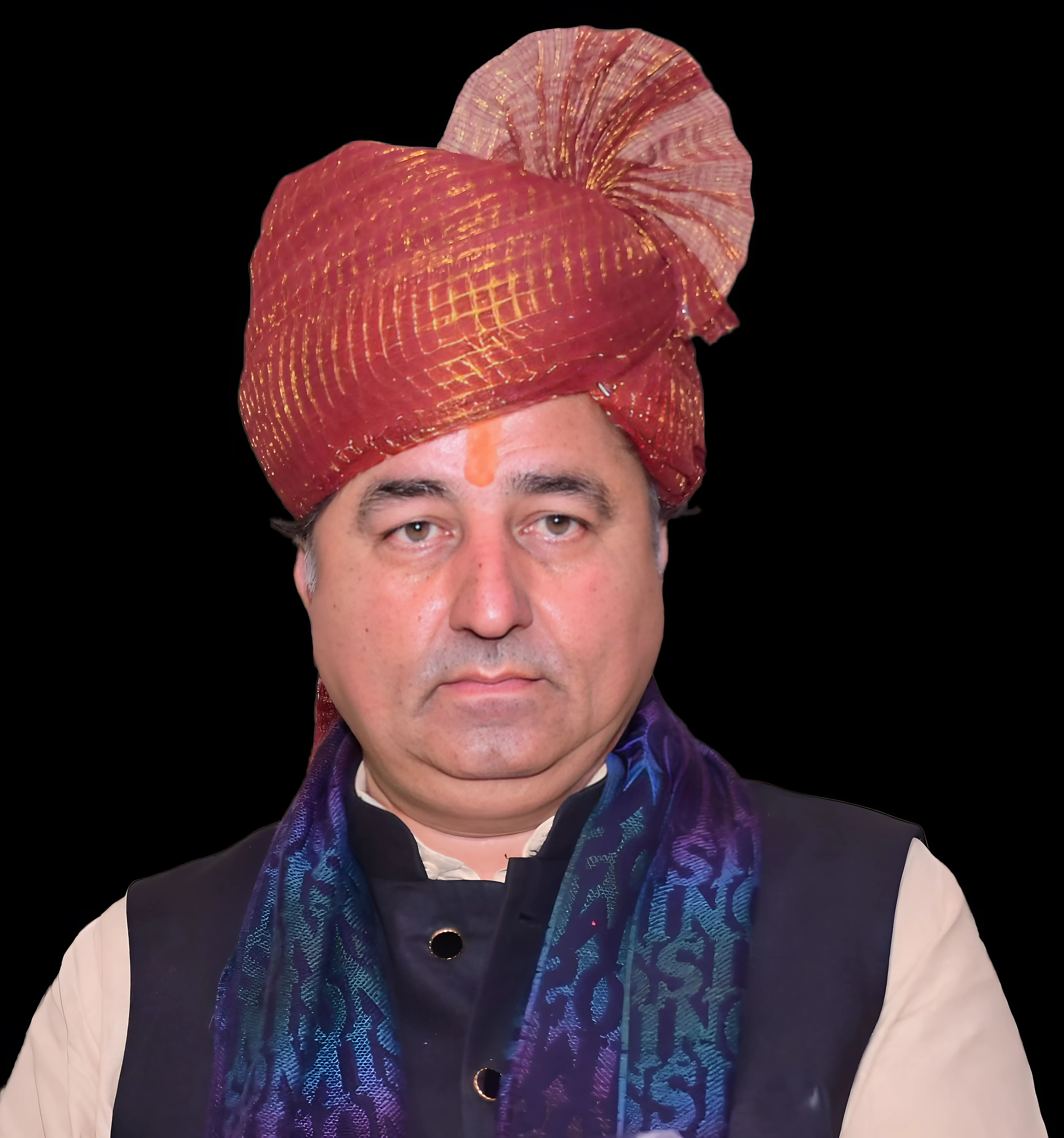
- Incumbent KK Vishnoi
- Party: Bhartiya Janata Party
- Elected year: 2023

Gudamalani Assembly constituency is one of the 200 Legislative Assembly constituencies of Rajasthan state in India. It is in Barmer district and is a part of Barmer Lok Sabha constituency.

== Members of the Legislative Assembly ==
Year	Name	Party
1957	Ram Dan Chaudhary	Indian National Congress
1962	Gangaram Choudhary	Indian National Congress
1967	Gangaram Choudhary	Indian National Congress
1972	Gangaram Choudhary	Indian National Congress
1977	Gangaram Choudhary	Indian National Congress
1980	Hemaram Choudhary	Indian National Congress
1985	Hemaram Choudhary	Indian National Congress
1990	Madan Kaur	Janata Dal
1993	Parasram Maderna	Indian National Congress
1998	Hemaram Choudhary	Indian National Congress
2003	Hemaram Choudhary	Indian National Congress
2008	Hemaram Choudhary	Indian National Congress
2013	Ladu Ram Bishnoi	Bharatiya Janata Party
2018	Hemaram Choudhary	Indian National Congress
2023	KK Vishnoi	Bharatiya Janata Party

== Election results ==
=== 2023 ===
2023 Rajasthan Legislative Assembly election: Gudha Malani
Party	Candidate	Votes	%	±%
BJP	Krishan Kumar K.K. Vishnoi	107,632	48.85	+7.03
INC	Col. Sonaram Choudhary	92,415	41.95	−6.97
ASP(KR)	Prabhuram	9,924	4.5	
Abhinav Rajasthan Party	Achalaram Choudhary	2,315	1.05	
BSP	Mahendra Kumar	2,198	1.0	−0.53
NOTA	None of the above	2,358	1.07	+0.02
Majority		15,217	6.9	−0.2
Turnout		220,316	81.56	−1.87
BJP gain from INC		Swing		

=== 2018 ===
2018 Rajasthan Legislative Assembly election: Gudamalani
Party	Candidate	Votes	%	±%
INC	Hemaram Choudhary	93,433	48.92	
BJP	Ladu Ram	79,869	41.82	
RLP	Vijay Singh	4,461	2.34	
AAP	Hanuman Choudhary	3,031	1.59	
BSP	Pawan Kumar	2,920	1.53	
BMP	Adaram Meghwal	2,343	1.23	
Independent	Bhikharam Prajapat	1,896	0.99	
NOTA	None of the above	2,012	1.05	
Majority		13,564	7.1	
Turnout		190,991	83.43	
INC gain from BJP		Swing		

=== 2013 ===
2013 Rajasthan Legislative Assembly election: Gudamalani
Party	Candidate	Votes	%	±%
BJP	Ladu Ram	91,619	55.75	+14.97
INC	Hemaram Choudhary	58,464	35.57	−12.37
CPI	Ridmal Ram	3,042	1.85	
BSP	Sumar Khan	2,734	1.66	
NPP	Narendra Kumar	2,717	1.65	
Independent	Ganesha Ram	2,138	1.30	
Bharatiya Yuva Shakti	Ramlal	1,526	0.93	
NOTA	None of the above	2,109	1.28	
Majority		33,155	20.18	+13.02
Turnout		1,64,349	85.87	+9.97
BJP gain from INC		Swing		

=== 2008 ===
2008 Rajasthan Legislative Assembly election: Gudamalani
Party	Candidate	Votes	%	±%
INC	Hemaram Choudhary	62,166	47.94	−3.10
BJP	Ladu Ram	52,889	40.78	−1.77
BSP	Shushila	4,233	3.26	
BBP	Gordhanram	3,065	2.36	
Independent	Ratanlal Meghwal	2,964	2.29	
Independent	Dhodha Khan	1,491	1.15	
Independent	Malaram Choudhary	793	0.61	
Independent	Arjanram	781	0.60	
Independent	Gulabaram	694	0.54	
Independent	Asu Ram	603	0.46	
Majority		9,277	7.16	−1.33
Turnout		1,29,679	75.90	+3.95
INC hold		Swing		

=== 2003 ===
2003 Rajasthan Legislative Assembly election: Gudamalani
Party	Candidate	Votes	%	±%
INC	Hemaram Choudhary	71,647	51.04	−21.06
BJP	Ladu Ram	59,735	42.55	
INLD	Magha Ram Nain	9,000	6.41	+3.99
Majority		11,912	8.49	−45.76
Turnout		1,40,382	71.95	+11.55
INC hold		Swing		

=== 1998 ===
1998 Rajasthan Legislative Assembly election: Gudamalani
Party	Candidate	Votes	%	±%
INC	Hemaram Choudhary	69,819	72.10	
BJP	Kailash Beniwal	17,282	17.85	
Independent	Kishori Lal	4,603	4.75	
Independent	Gordhan Ram	2,781	2.87	
Independent	Magha Ram	2,348	2.42	
Majority		52,537	54.25	+35.32
Turnout		96,833	60.40	+4.81
INC hold		Swing		

=== 1993 ===
1993 Rajasthan Legislative Assembly election: Gudamalani
Party	Candidate	Votes	%	±%
INC	Parasram Maderna	44,680	55.17	
BJP	Satya Pal	29,348	36.24	
JD	Hariram Karwasra	2,994	3.70	
Independent	Bhikharam Meghwansi	1,922	2.37	
Independent	Mangilal Kabli	1,220	1.51	
Doordarshi Party	Jawala Prasad	723	0.89	
Independent	Khetaram Meghwal	100	0.12	
Majority		15,332	18.93	−17.85
Turnout		80,987	55.59	+7
INC gain from JD		Swing		

=== 1990 ===
1990 Rajasthan Legislative Assembly election: Gudamalani
Party	Candidate	Votes	%	±%
JD	Madan Kaur	40,594	63.46	
INC	Chaina Ram	17,067	26.68	
Independent	Magha Ram	3,878	6.06	
Doordarshi Party	Jala Ram	625	0.98	
Independent	Jeta Ram	464	0.73	
Independent	Jwana	450	0.70	
Independent	Karna	314	0.49	
Insaf Party	Ahmad	143	0.22	
Independent	Narsi	132	0.21	
Independent	Mota Ram	94	0.15	
Independent	Teja Ram	72	0.11	
Independent	Achla Ram	70	0.11	
Independent	Sukh Ram	61	0.10	
Majority		23,527	36.78	−21.13
Turnout		63,964	48.59	+4.70
JD gain from INC		Swing		

=== 1985 ===
1985 Rajasthan Legislative Assembly election: Gudamalani
Party	Candidate	Votes	%	±%
INC	Hemaram Choudhary	38,127	76.87	+17.03
LKD	Kailash Beniwal	9,404	18.96	
Independent	Bheekaram Meghwal	1,477	2.98	
Independent	Jai Dev	590	1.19	
Majority		28,723	57.91	+33.45
Turnout		49,598	43.89	−5.16
INC hold		Swing		

=== 1980 ===
1980 Rajasthan Legislative Assembly election: Gudamalani
Party	Candidate	Votes	%	±%
INC(I)	Hemaram Choudhary	27,208	59.84	
INC(U)	Gangaram Choudhary	16,088	35.38	−29.01
Independent	Dheemaram Jakhad	2,172	4.78	
Majority		11,120	24.46	−7.04
Turnout		45,468	49.05	−1.91
INC hold		Swing		

=== 1977 ===
1977 Rajasthan Legislative Assembly election: Gudamalani
Party	Candidate	Votes	%	±%
INC	Gangaram Choudhary	24,917	64.39	−14.53
JP	Poonam Chand	12,728	32.89	
Independent	Moola Ram	931	2.41	
Independent	Ram Kishor	121	0.31	
Majority		12,189	31.5	−26.34
Turnout		38,697	50.96	−1.15
INC hold		Swing		

=== 1972 ===
1972 Rajasthan Legislative Assembly election: Gudamalani
Party	Candidate	Votes	%	±%
INC	Gangaram Choudhary	26,922	78.92	+19.51
SWA	Dheema Ram	7,193	21.08	
Majority		19,729	57.84	+39.02
Turnout		34,115	52.11	+19.1
INC hold		Swing		

=== 1967 ===
1967 Rajasthan Legislative Assembly election: Gudamalani
Party	Candidate	Votes	%	±%
INC	Gangaram Choudhary	11,169	59.41	+6.33
Independent	D. Singh	7,632	40.59	
Majority		3,537	18.82	−11.31
Turnout		18,801	33.01	−1.52
INC hold		Swing		

=== 1962 ===
1962 Rajasthan Legislative Assembly election: Gudamalani
Party	Candidate	Votes	%	±%
INC	Gangaram Choudhary	11,577	53.08	
Independent	Bachoo	5,005	22.95	
Independent	Dharmendra Singh	4,934	22.62	
Independent	Likhmi Chand	293	1.34	
Majority		6,572	30.13	+17.98
Turnout		21,809	34.53	+6.54
INC hold		Swing		

=== 1957 ===
1957 Rajasthan Legislative Assembly election: Gudamalani
Party	Candidate	Votes	%	±%
INC	Ram Dan	6,712	47.11	
RRP	Babu	4,981	34.96	
Independent	Dalla	1,385	9.72	
Independent	Dheema	1,169	8.21	
Majority		1,731	12.15	
Turnout		14,247	27.99	
INC win (new seat)				

== See also ==
- List of constituencies of the Rajasthan Legislative Assembly
- Barmer district
