= Gudamalani =

Gudamalani Guda
- Town
- Location in Rajasthan, India Gudamalani (India)
- Coordinates: 25°10′59″N 71°43′0″E
- Country: India
- State: Rajasthan
- District: Balotra

Government
  - Type: Tehsil and SDM Municipality
- Elevation: 41 m (135 ft)

Population
  - Total: 4,540

Languages
  - Official: Marwari, Hindi
- Time zone: UTC+5:30 (IST)
- PIN: 344031
- ISO 3166 code: RJ-IN
- Vehicle registration: RJ-04
- Nearest city: Barmer
- Lok Sabha constituency: Barmer (Lok Sabha constituency)
- Vidhan Sabha Constituency =: Gudamalani

Gudamalani is a town and Tehsil within the Balotra district of Rajasthan state of India. The village is located in the Thar Desert. Gudamalani is situated on the highway connecting Jodhpur to Ahmedabad. This area, unlike the Thar Desert area, is somewhat green and the land is fertile . The Luni River of Rajasthan flows through Gudamalani. This town in near several historical temples, such as Aalam Ji's Temple, Bhuteswar Temple, Guru Jambheswer Bhagwan Temple with Darmshala, and Bholaghar Ji Temple.

== History ==
Before independence, Gudamalani was ruled by Vaghela Kings who claimed descent from Jaitmal, son of Rao Salkhaji and brother of Saint Mallinathji Mahecha. The titular head was called Rana and part of this Kingdom was in modern-day Pakistan. Until the death of the last Rana ruler of Gudamalani, the heads of all the villages in both India and Pakistan come to pay annual homage to the Kings and their ancestors. Rana Bhawani Singh and Rana Kuldeep Singh are the present Rana of Guda.

People of this area have special faith in the god Aalam Ji ("Aalam" is derived from Persian-Mughal languages). Aalam Ji is believed to be the reincarnation of Saint Ramapeer. During the rule, the total number of revenue villages were 112. The Jagir of Gurha was considered to be bigger than that of Sirohi, according to the land area.

== Demographics ==
According to the Population Census 2011, the population of Gudamalani is 6336. Among them, 3273 are males, and 3063 are females.

== See also ==
- Gudamalani (Rajasthan Assembly constituency)
