= Ramsar, Rajasthan =

Ramsar
- Tehsil
- Country: India
- State: Rajasthan
- District: Barmer

Government
  - Body: Tehsil

Area
  - Total: 1,455 km^{2} (562 sq mi)

Population (2011)
  - Total: 108,001
  - Density: 74.23/km^{2} (192.2/sq mi)

Languages
  - Official: Hindi
  - Regional: Rajasthani, Marwadi, Sindhi
- Time zone: UTC+5:30 (IST)
- PIN: 344502
- Telephone code: 091-2985
- ISO 3166 code: RJ-IN
- Vehicle registration: RJ-04
- Lok Sabha constituency: Barmer (Lok Sabha constituency)
- Village: 168

Ramsar is a panchayat samiti and tehsil in the Barmer district in the Indian state of Rajasthan. Ramsar has 25 Gram Panchayats having 183 villages in total. The subdivisional executive is headed by SDM and the assistant collector.

== Demographics ==
Religions in Ramsar tehsil (2011)
Religion	Percent
Hinduism	56.06%
Islam	43.59%
Other or not stated	0.36%

The population of Ramsar is 108,001 according to the 2011 census of India.

=== Languages ===
Languages of Ramsar tehsil (2011)
1. Marwari (47.5%)
2. Rajasthani (33.8%)
3. Sindhi (16.4%)
4. Others (2.26%)

At the time of the 2011 census, 47.52% of the population in Ramsar tehsil spoke Marwari, 33.77% Rajasthani, 16.45% Sindhi and 2.26% spoke the other languages. People in the west of the tehsil along the border with Pakistan speak Dhatki, a mix of Marwari and Sindhi.
