= Barmer district =

- District of Rajasthan
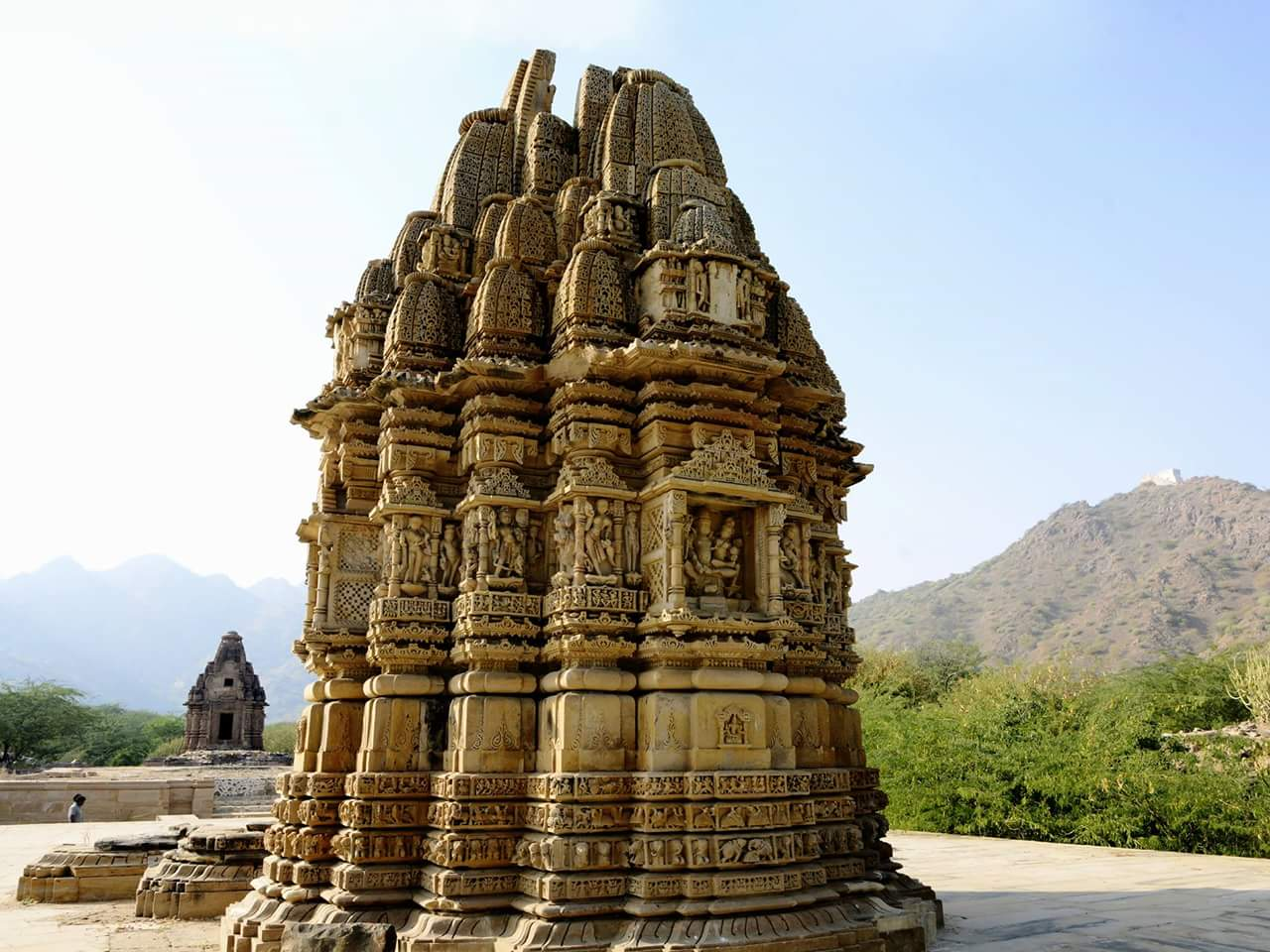
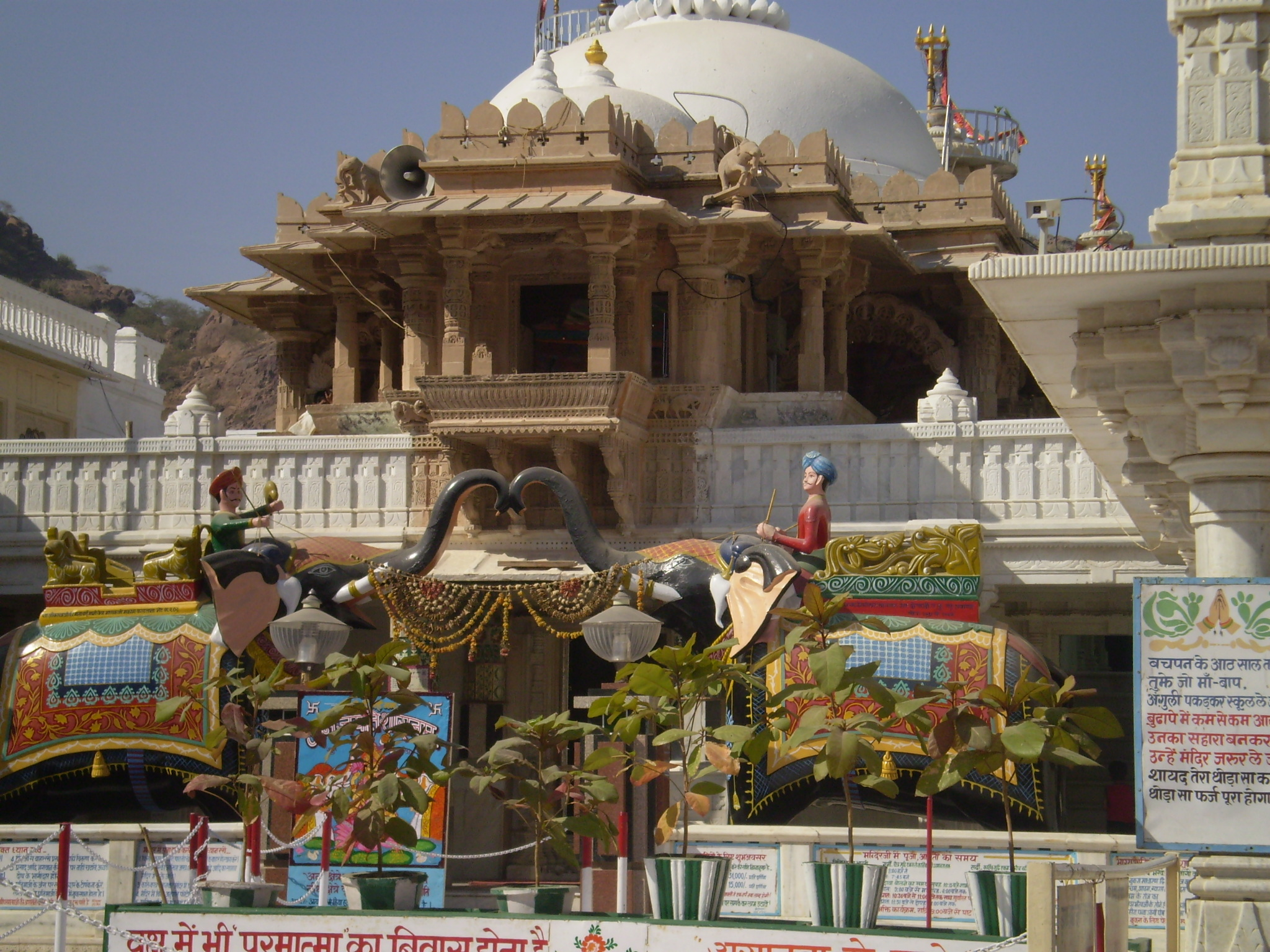
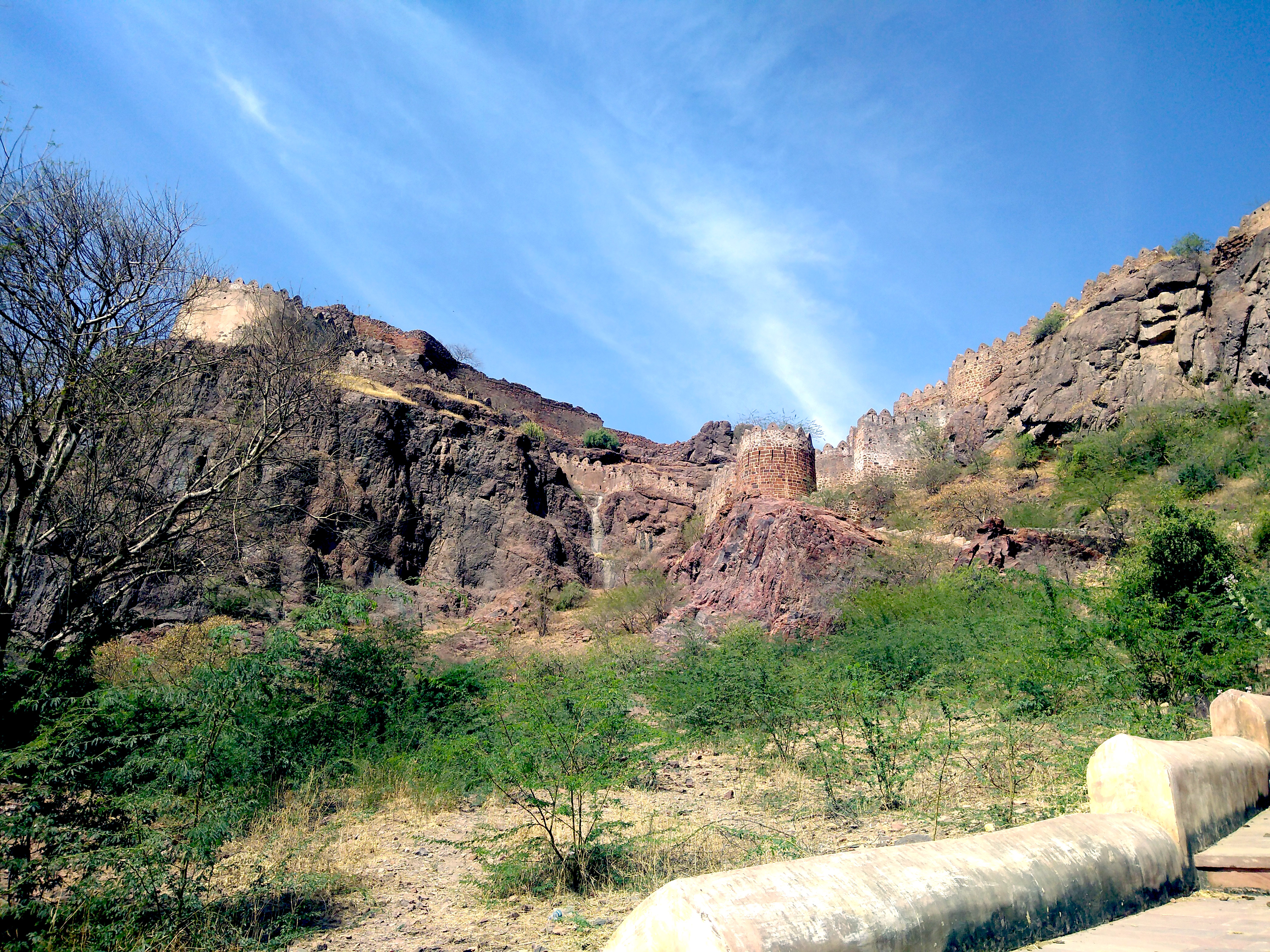
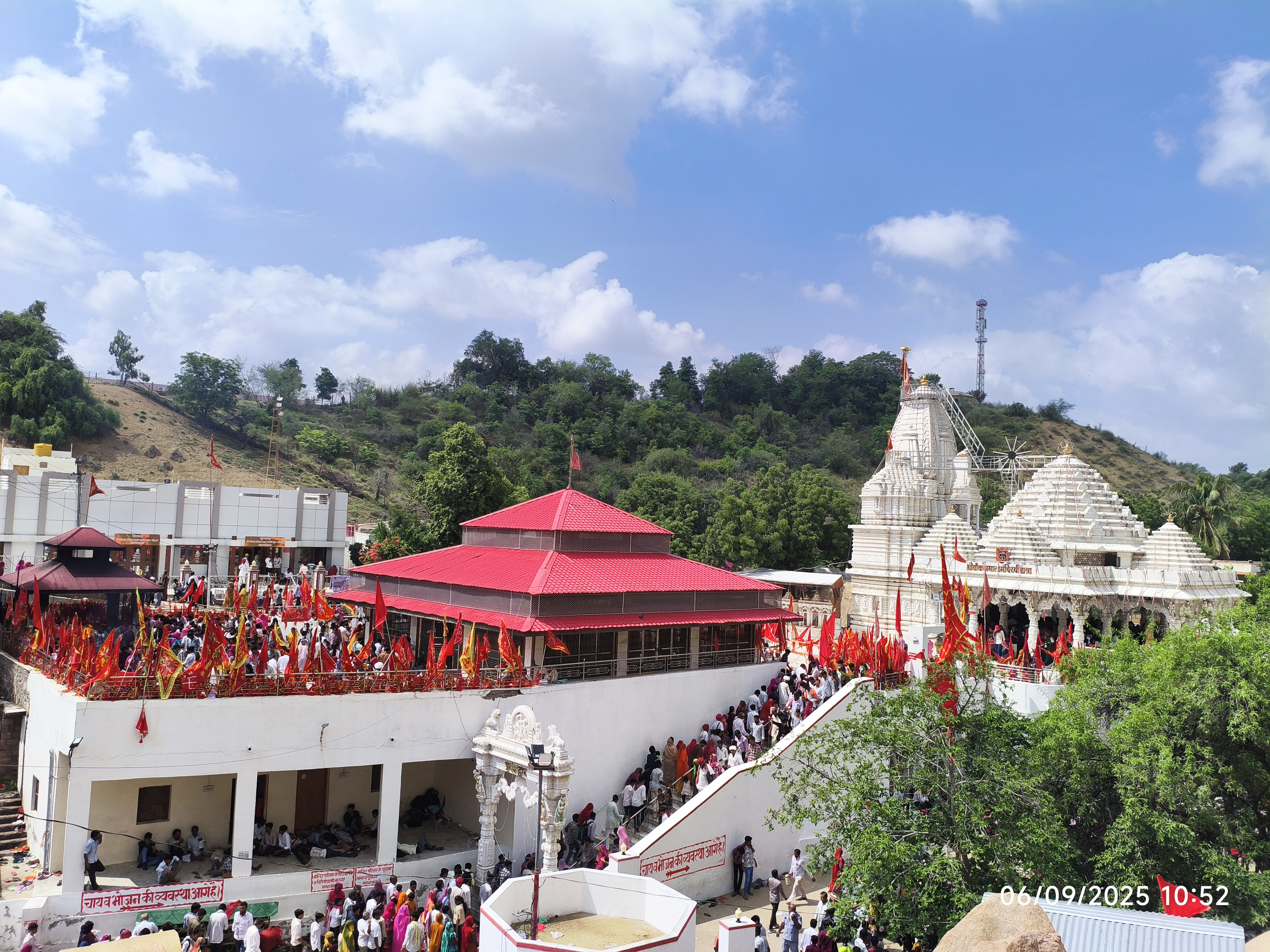
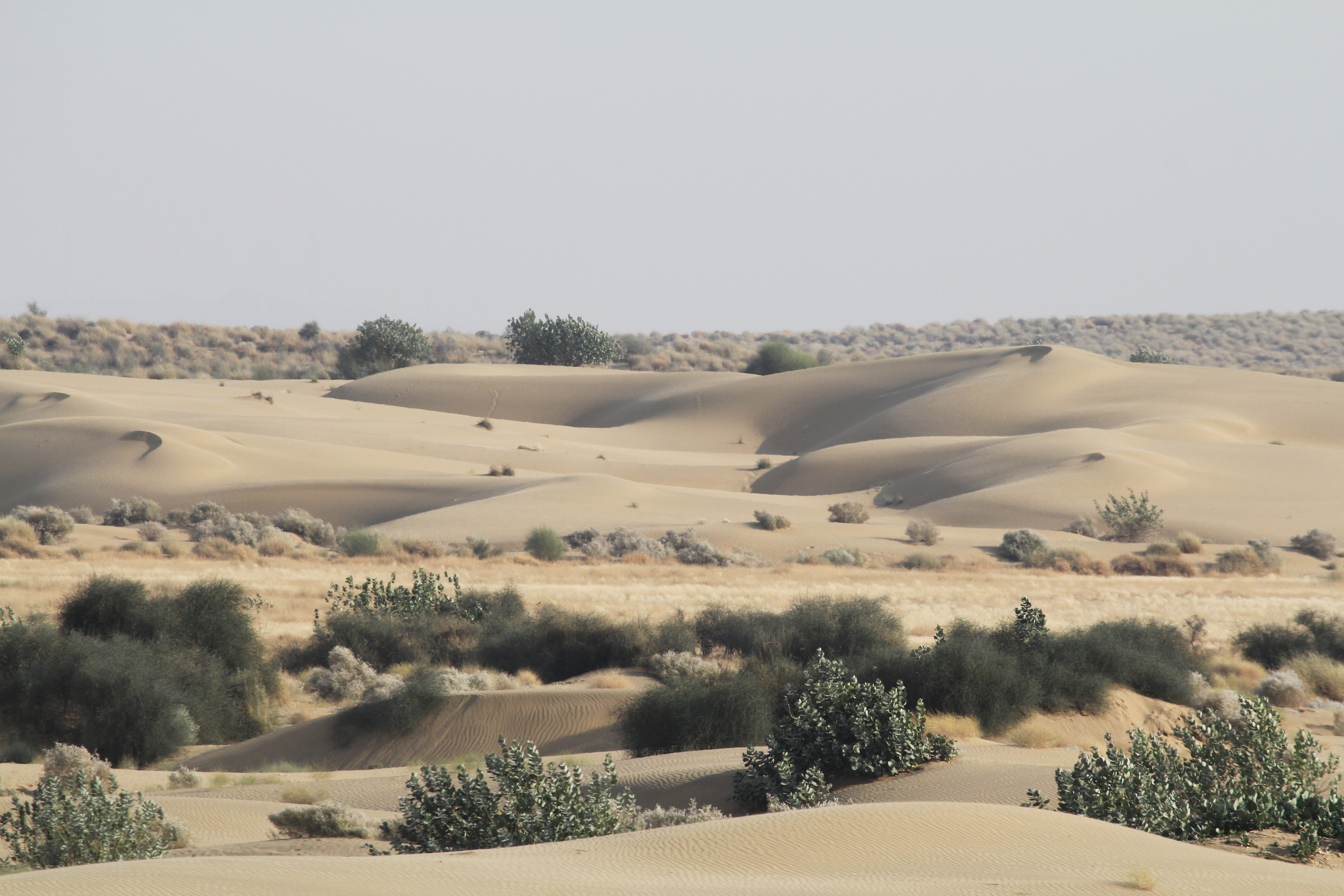
- Clockwise from top-left: Kiradu Mandir, Siwana Fort, Nakodaji, Viratra Vankal Mata Temple, Barmer, A view of Sams Sand Dunes, Siwana Fort
- Interactive map of Barmer district
- Coordinates (Barmer, Rajasthan|Barmer): 25.75°N 71.38°E
- Country: India
- State: Rajasthan
- Division: Jodhpur
- Headquarters: Barmer
- Tehsils: Barmer, Barmer Gramin, Gadra Road, Gudamalani, Gira, Chohtan, Dhanau, Dhorimana, Nokhra, Bataru, Ramsar, Sheo, Sedwa

Government
  - District Collector & District Magistrate: Chinmayee Gopal, IAS
  - Superintendent of Police: Chunaram Jat, IPS
  - Chief Executive Officer, Zila Parishad: Ravi Kumar, IAS

Area
  - Total: 28,387 km^{2} (10,960 sq mi)
  - Rank: 5th in India , 3rd in Rajasthan

Population (2011)
  - Total: 2,603,751
  - Density: 91.723/km^{2} (237.56/sq mi)
- Time zone: UTC+05:30 (IST)
- PIN: 344001
- Telephone code: 02982
- Vehicle registration: RJ-04
- Website: Barmer District

Barmer district is a district in Rajasthan state of India. Barmer is located in the western part of Rajasthan state forming a part of the Thar Desert. Barmer was the third largest district by area in Rajasthan and fifth largest district in India, occupying an area of 28,387 km^{2} before creation of new districts. Being in the western part of the state, it includes a part of the Thar Desert. Jaisalmer is to the north of this district while Jalore is in its south. Balotra form its eastern border and it shares a border with Pakistan in the west. Partially being a desert, this district has a large variation in temperature. The temperature in summer can rise up to 51 °C and falls near to 0 °C in winter. Luni is the longest river in Barmer district. After travelling a length of almost 500 km, it passes through Jalore and merges in the marshy land of Runn of Kutch. District headquarters is in the town of Barmer. The other major towns in the district are: Guda Malani, Dhorimana, Sheo and Chohatan. Recently, a large onshore oil field has been discovered and made functional in Barmer district. Barmer is also famous for pomegranate.

== History ==
In earlier times, the district was known as Malani, in the name of Rawal Mallinath Rathore (मल्लिनाथ). Rawal Mallinath was the son of Rao Salkha and Rawal Mallinath is cultural, philanthropical and religious icon in Barmer, He is worshiped as God by local peoples. The whole area around the river Luni was said to have Malani (मलानी), derived from the name Mallinath. Present name of Barmer is derived from its founder ruler Bahad Rao Punia (Juna Barmer), it was named Bahadamer ("The Hill Fort of Bahada"). Bahad Rao Punia(Juna Barmer) founded a town that is now known as Juna, and the settlement extended over approcimately 255 km, encompassing the area of the present-day city Barmer, and established the foundation for the Barmer region.

After Parmers, Rawat Luka -Grand Son of Rawal Mallinath, establish their kingdom in Juna Barmer with help of his brother Rawal Mandalak. They defeated Parmers of Juna & made it their capital. Thereafter, his descendant, Rawat Bhima, who was a great warrior, established the present city of Barmer in 1552 AD and shifted his capital to Barmer from Juna.

== Geography ==
Barmer is located in the western part of the state forming a part of the Thar Desert. The district borders Jaisalmer district in the north, Jalore district in the south, Balotra district in the east, and Pakistan in the west. The district borders Tharpakar district of Sindh, the district with the largest population of Hindus in Pakistan. The district of barmer has been divided into two with formation of Balotra on 7 August 2023.

The total area of the district is 28,387 square kilometres (10,960 sq mi). After Jaisalmer district and Bikaner district, it was the third largest district of Rajasthan before new district formation. It is also the fifth largest district in the country.

The district is located between 24,58' to 26, 32'N Latitudes and 70, 05' to 72, 52' E Longitudes.

The longest river in the district is the Luni. It is 480 km in length and drain into the Gulf of Kutch passing through Jalore. The variation in temperature in various seasons is quite high owing to arid thar desert and sandy soil. In summers the temperature soars to 46 °C to 51 °C. In winters it drops to 0 °C (41 °F). Primarily Barmer district is a desert where average rainfall in a year is 277 mm. However, extreme rainfall of 549 mm rain between 16 and 25 August 2006 left many dead and huge losses due to flood in a nearby town Kawas and whole town submerged. As many as twenty new lakes formed, with six covering an area of over 10 km^{2}.

Poorly planned and rapid urbanisation has increased Barmer's vulnerability to flash flooding. The local ecology and soil type is not equipped to deal with sudden or excessive water accumulation, which causes short- and long-term damage. Other areas suffer the gradual effects of 'invisible disasters', which also threaten the lives and livelihoods of the locals.

=== Climate ===
The climate is hot semi arid (Koppen: BSh).

Climate data for Barmer (1981–2010, extremes 1901–2012)
Month	Jan	Feb	Mar	Apr	May	Jun	Jul	Aug	Sep	Oct	Nov	Dec	Year
Record high °C (°F)	36.6 (97.9)	39.4 (102.9)	43.3 (109.9)	48.3 (118.9)	49.9 (121.8)	48.7 (119.7)	45.5 (113.9)	43.7 (110.7)	45.9 (114.6)	43.1 (109.6)	39.4 (102.9)	35.2 (95.4)	49.9 (121.8)
Mean daily maximum °C (°F)	30.5 (86.9)	30.5 (86.9)	39.8 (103.6)	44.0 (111.2)	45.9 (114.6)	44.9 (112.8)	41.6 (106.9)	38.8 (101.8)	40.3 (104.5)	40.2 (104.4)	36.1 (97.0)	31.6 (88.9)	38.7 (101.7)
Mean daily minimum °C (°F)	6.0 (42.8)	8.2 (46.8)	13.3 (55.9)	18.6 (65.5)	22.9 (73.2)	23.9 (75.0)	23.7 (74.7)	23.4 (74.1)	22.6 (72.7)	17.6 (63.7)	11.4 (52.5)	7.3 (45.1)	16.6 (61.9)
Record low °C (°F)	−1.7 (28.9)	3.8 (38.8)	4.5 (40.1)	12.2 (54.0)	16.7 (62.1)	16.2 (61.2)	19.4 (66.9)	20.0 (68.0)	16.7 (62.1)	13.9 (57.0)	6.7 (44.1)	2.3 (36.1)	−1.7 (28.9)
Average rainfall mm (inches)	1.3 (0.05)	2.4 (0.09)	1.8 (0.07)	2.8 (0.11)	29.8 (1.17)	65.8 (2.59)	99.1 (3.90)	123.0 (4.84)	73.2 (2.88)	3.8 (0.15)	1.2 (0.05)	0.5 (0.02)	385.8 (15.19)
Average rainy days	0.2	0.3	0.2	0.4	0.8	1.4	6.3	5.3	1.9	0.4	0.2	0.2	17.7
Average relative humidity (%) (at 17:30 IST)	30	25	21	19	22	33	48	54	43	28	30	32	32
Source: India Meteorological Department

== Economy ==
In 2016 the Ministry of Panchayati Raj named Barmer one of the country's 250 most backward districts (out of a total of 640). It is one of the twelve districts in Rajasthan currently receiving funds from the Backward Regions Grant Fund Programme (BRGF).

== Demographics ==
Historical population
Year	Pop.	±% p.a.
1901	313,102	—
1911	299,518	−0.44%
1921	281,438	−0.62%
1931	308,264	+0.91%
1941	394,529	+2.50%
1951	477,282	+1.92%
1961	649,794	+3.13%
1971	774,805	+1.78%
1981	1,118,892	+3.74%
1991	1,435,222	+2.52%
2001	1,964,835	+3.19%
2011	2,603,751	+2.86%

Religions in Barmer district (2011)
Religion	Percent
Hinduism	86.22%
Islam	12.34%
Jainism	1.31%
Sikhism	0.57%
Other or not stated	0.13%

At the time of the 2011 census, the district had a population of 2,603,751. The district has a population density of 92 inhabitants per square kilometre (240/sq mi). Its population growth rate over the decade 2001–2011 was 32.52%. Barmer has a sex ratio of 902 females for every 1000 males, and a literacy rate of 56.53%. 6.98% of the population lives in urban areas. Scheduled Castes and Scheduled Tribes made up 16.76% and 6.77% of the population respectively.

=== Languages ===
Languages of Barmer district (2011)
1. Marwari (61.1%)
2. Rajasthani (32.9%)
3. Sindhi (3.99%)
4. Hindi (1.60%)
5. Others (0.34%)

At the time of the 2011 census, 61.14% of the population spoke Marwari, 32.93% Rajasthani, 3.99% Sindhi and 1.60% Hindi as their first language. People in the west of the district along the border with Pakistan speak Dhatki, a mix of Marwari and Sindhi.

== People and culture ==
Barmer district is part of the Great Indian Desert or Thar Desert. Like all other districts in the desert region, Barmer is known for its folk music and dance. The Bhopas (priest singers) are found in Barmer, who compose music in honour of the deities of the region and its war heroes. The other folk musicians come from a community called the Muslim Dholis (drummers) for most of whom this is the only means of livelihood. Langas and Manganiars are the some of these communities. People speak mostly Rajasthani, while Hindi is the official language here. Scheduled Castes and Scheduled Tribes make up 16.8% and 6.8% of the population respectively.

Barmer is known for its carved wooden furniture and hand block printing industry.

== Tourism ==
Barmer is famous for its historic monuments and the temples which are located in the region. Barmer city houses number of such temples which attract tourists from all over the country. The city is very famous for the temple of Goddess Jagdamba. It is an ancient temple and the archaeologists suggest that the temple is as old as 500 years. The Jagdambe Mata temple is located at a height of around 140 m above plain land.

Barmer is also famous for the cattle fair (Tilwara) which is organised every year. The place is also renowned for camel milk, hand block printing, woollen industries, carved wooden furniture and handicrafts.

The major festival of the region is the Thar festival which is organised every year by the government to attract more and more tourists to the region. The festival is organised in the month of March every year.

== Administration ==
Barmer is the headquarters of the district, which is the principal town also, for the administrative purposes. The district is divided into 3 sub-divisions viz, Barmer, Sheo and Guda Malani.

=== Tehsils ===
- Barmer
- Barmer Rural
- Batadoo
- Chohtan
- Dhanau
- Dhorimana
- Gadra Road
- Guda Malani
- Nokhra
- Ramsar
- Sedwa
- Sheo

The total of 2,160 villages in Barmer District come under Seventeen Panchayat Samitis.

== Oil industry ==
Once known as "kala pani" where government employees were sent on punishment postings because of its desert, water problems, and border area. In 2009, the Barmer district came into the news due to its large Oil basin. The British exploration company Cairn Energy is going to start the production soon in the year 2009 on the large scale. Mangala, Bhagyam and Aishwariya are the major oil fields in the district. This is India's biggest oil discovery in 22 years. Cairn works in partnership with state owned Oil and Natural Gas Corporation (ONGC). Cairn holds 70% in the field, while state-run ONGC holds the remaining 30%. In March 2010, Cairn increased oil potential from this field to 6.5 billion barrels of oil – from an earlier estimate of 4 billion barrels.

== Underground airbase ==
Uttarlai military airbase is situated in Barmer district, Uttarlai is India's first under ground airbase. The Battle of Longewala (4 December 1971 – 5 December 1971) was one of the first major engagements in the Western Sector during the Indo-Pakistani War of 1971, fought between assaulting Pakistani forces and Indian defenders at the border post of Longewala. In March 2024, the government gave the Barmer district collector free land to build a civil airport near the Uttarlai Air Force Station. The government also approved 65 acres of land for the airport. The terminal will be built on 7.10 bigha of land near Uttarlai. Flights will start from the Air Force runway, and Barmer will be connected with air service.

== See also ==
- Thar Desert
- Tharparkar
