= Barmer, Rajasthan =

Barmer
- City
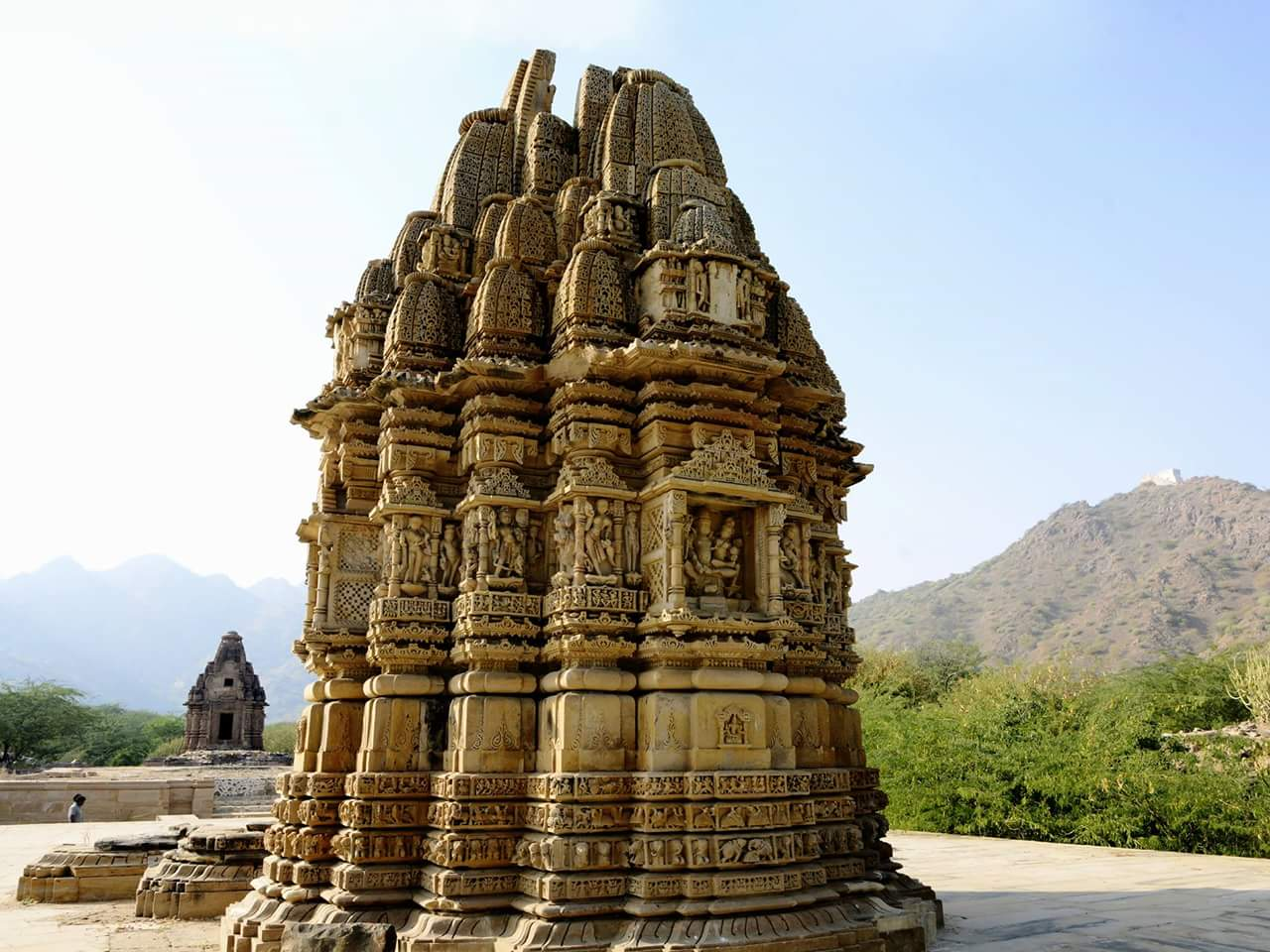
- Kiradu temples in Barmer, Rajasthan

- Location in Rajasthan, India Barmer (India)
- Coordinates: 25.75°N 71.38°E
- Country: India
- State: Rajasthan
- District: Barmer
- Founder: Mallinath

Government
  - Type: Nagar Parishad
  - Body: Barmer Municipal Council

Area
  - City: 28 km^{2} (11 sq mi)
- Elevation: 227 m (745 ft)

Population (2011)
  - City: 100,015
  - Metro: 184,000

Languages
  - Official: Hindi, Rajasthani, Marwadi
- Time zone: UTC+5:30 (IST)
- PIN: 344001
- ISO 3166 code: RJ-IN
- Vehicle registration: RJ-04
- Website: barmer.rajasthan.gov.in

Barmer is a city and municipal council in the Barmer district in the state of Rajasthan, India. It is the administrative headquarters of Barmer district. Barmer is a Group 'C' city for living standards and the headquarters of the Barmer tehsil, Rajasthan. Barmer district is located in western part of Rajasthan.

== Demographics ==
As of the 2011 census, Barmer had a population of 100,051. Of the total population, 22% are aged 0-6. Barmer had an average literacy rate of 56.53%; 70% of males and 30% of females are literate.

=== Religion ===
Religion in Barmer city (2011)
1. Hinduism (81.4%)
2. Jainism (11.8%)
3. Islam (6.40%)
4. Other (0.42%)

== Geography ==
The district is spread across an area of 28,387 km^{2}. Barmer district is the third-largest district of Rajasthan State. This district is famous for its vegetation, such as khejari, ber, ker, sangari and anar (pomegranate). It is located between 24°58' and 26°32' N and between 70°05' and 72°52' E. It forms a part of the Thar desert and is situated in the western part of the state.

=== Climate ===
The climate is hot and semi arid (Koppen: BSh). There is a peak in rainfall during the summer monsoon season. In May 2025, Barmer recorded the highest temperature in the country at 48.4 degrees.

Climate data for Barmer (1991–2020, extremes 1932–present)
Month	Jan	Feb	Mar	Apr	May	Jun	Jul	Aug	Sep	Oct	Nov	Dec	Year
Record high °C (°F)	36.6 (97.9)	39.4 (102.9)	43.4 (110.1)	48.3 (118.9)	49.9 (121.8)	48.7 (119.7)	45.5 (113.9)	43.7 (110.7)	43.2 (109.8)	43.1 (109.6)	39.4 (102.9)	35.2 (95.4)	49.9 (121.8)
Mean daily maximum °C (°F)	25.4 (77.7)	29.5 (85.1)	35.1 (95.2)	39.7 (103.5)	42.3 (108.1)	40.8 (105.4)	37.2 (99.0)	35.2 (95.4)	36.3 (97.3)	36.9 (98.4)	32.2 (90.0)	27.5 (81.5)	35.0 (95.0)
Mean daily minimum °C (°F)	10.2 (50.4)	13.5 (56.3)	19.2 (66.6)	24.2 (75.6)	27.1 (80.8)	28.0 (82.4)	27.1 (80.8)	26.1 (79.0)	25.1 (77.2)	22.0 (71.6)	16.3 (61.3)	11.7 (53.1)	20.9 (69.6)
Record low °C (°F)	−1.7 (28.9)	3.8 (38.8)	4.5 (40.1)	12.2 (54.0)	16.7 (62.1)	16.2 (61.2)	19.4 (66.9)	20.0 (68.0)	16.7 (62.1)	13.9 (57.0)	6.7 (44.1)	2.3 (36.1)	−1.7 (28.9)
Average rainfall mm (inches)	8.9 (0.35)	8.5 (0.33)	11.7 (0.46)	9.3 (0.37)	5.8 (0.23)	65.1 (2.56)	123.8 (4.87)	99.5 (3.92)	73.4 (2.89)	9.2 (0.36)	16.8 (0.66)	8.5 (0.33)	385.5 (15.18)
Average rainy days	0.3	0.3	0.1	0.6	1.3	3.9	6.5	6.5	2.0	0.0	0.2	0.5	18.2
Average relative humidity (%) (at 17:30 IST)	32	27	22	20	23	34	50	57	47	34	34	35	34
Source: India Meteorological Department
