= Brahma Temple, Asotra =

Spiritual ashram and temple

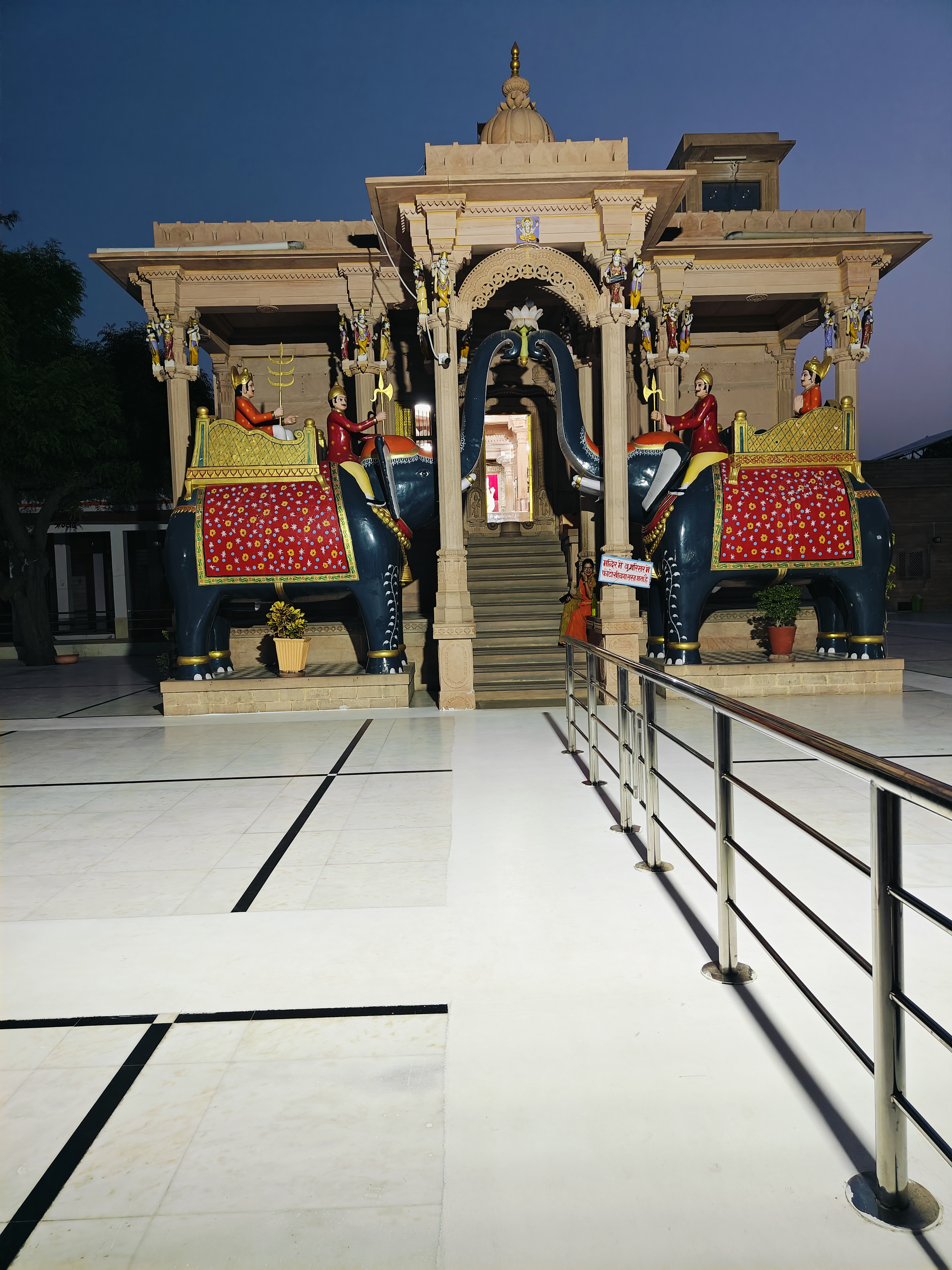

- Location within Rajasthan Location within India

Religion
- Affiliation: Hinduism
- District: Balotra district
- Deity: Brahma

Location
- Location: Balotra
- State: Rajasthan
- Country: India
- Coordinates: 25.83°N 72.23°E

Architecture
- Style: Nilachal Architecture

Website
- https://brahmdhamtirth.org/

Brahma Temple also known as Shri Kheteshwar Brahmadham Teerth, Asotra in Asotra, Rajasthan, is a significant temple dedicated to Lord Brahma, the creator god in Hinduism. is significant as the world's second Brahma temple, the first being the well-known temple in Pushkar.It was constructed by late Brahmarshi Sant Khetaram Ji Maharaj.

== Worship ==
The temple is unique in its status as a place of worship for Brahma.
