= Umarlai Khalsa =

- Village
- Location in Rajasthan, India
- Coordinates: 25.86°N 72.39°E
- Country: India
- State: Rajasthan
- District: Barmer

Government
  - Type: Democratic
  - Body: Government of Rajasthan
  - Sarpanch: Shravan Kumar
- Elevation: 106 m (348 ft)

Population (2011)
  - Total: 2,307

Languages
  - Official: Hindi, Marwadi
- Time zone: UTC+5:30 (IST)
- PIN: 344027
- Telephone code: 02988
- ISO 3166 code: RJ-IN
- Vehicle registration: RJ 39

Umarlai Khalsa is a village in Barmer District of Rajasthan state in India. It is about 100 km from Jodhpur. The town is famous for farming, Mata Nagnechiyaa Temple and Akhada, The town is well connected with Jodhpur by buses at frequent intervals. From Umarlai Khalsa towards Jalore there is India's Third Brahma Temple in the village of Asotra. From Umarlai Khalsa towards Barmer there is Ancient Temple of Lord Shri Vishnu named as Shri Ranchore Ray (first ranchore ray mandir of world), Khed Mandir in the village of Khed The name Umarlai Khalsa derived from all the religious people of this village. About 13 km from Balotra is located the famous Jain Temple Nakoda. The place receives religious devotees from across India. The town is located near on the coast of the river Luni. The village of Umarlai Khalsa is mainly popular for housing the famous Ancient Temples of Lord Shiva. It is one of the most revered pilgrimage destinations for the Hindu community. The temple is an excellent example of fine architecture and many sculptures are carved inside the temple. Apart from this temple, a number of other temples are located in the town which include the Pabuji Rathord Mandir, Jog Maya Matha Mandir, Gogaji Mandir, Bhomiyaji Mandir, Hanuman Mandir and more.

The village of Umarlai Khalsa is well connected with all the major cities of India through road transportation. The nearest airport is located in Jodhpur which is just 100 km from here.

== Geography ==
Balotra is located at 25.86°N 72.39°E It has an average elevation of 105 metres (345 feet).

Umarlai Khalsa is situated near to Pakistan border in the district of Barmer. It is also near the famous city ofJodhpur.

== Demographics ==
As of 2001 India census, Umarlai Khalsa had a population of 2,307. Males constitute 50.97% of the population and females 49.02%. Umarlai Khalsa has an average literacy rate of 45.3%.

Census Parameter	Census Data
Total Population	2,307
Total No of Houses	409
Female Population %	49.0 % (1131)
Total Literacy rate %	45.4 % (1047)
Female Literacy rate	16.3 % (377)
Scheduled Tribes Population %	10.4 % (241)
Scheduled Caste Population %	13.3 % (307)
Working Population %	47.1 %
Child(0 -6) Population by 2011	444
Girl Child(0 -6) Population % by 2011	42.8 % (190)

== Temples ==
- Dangi's Kuldevi Temple
- Ramdev Ji Temple
- Pabuji Rathore Ka Mandir
- Shiv Temple
- Hanuman Ji Temple
- Bayosaa Temple
- Sati Mata
