= Nanarwara =

Nanarwara (Nanarwada) Nanarwara Purohitan
- Village
- Location within Rajasthan Location within India
- Coordinates: 24°40′08″N 72°53′52″E
- Country: India
- State: Rajasthan
- District: Sirohi

Population (2011)
  - Total: 1,458

Languages
  - Official: Hindi
- Time zone: UTC+5:30 (IST)
- PIN: 307023
- Telephone code: 02971
- ISO 3166 code: RJ-IN
- Vehicle registration: RJ-24 / RJ-38
- Nearest city: Abu Road
- Lok Sabha constituency: Jalore
- Vidhan Sabha constituency: Abu-Pindwada

Nanarwara (Nanarwada) is a village in Sirohi district in Rajasthan state in India. It is located in the Base of Aravalli Hills, about 50 km south of Sirohi, 25 km north of Abu Road, and also 45 km North from Mount Abu (Hill Station). Swaroopganj is the nearest railway station.

Nanarwara is also known as Nanarwara-Purohitan because of majority of Rajpurohit (Bhaba Sepau ) community. In Nanarwara, Approx 250 houses of Rajpurohits out of 400 houses.
