= Sarana, Balotra =

Village in Rajasthan, India

Sarana
- Village
- Location in Rajasthan, India Sarana (India)
- Coordinates: 25°48′23″N 72°21′57″E
- Country: India
- State: Rajasthan
- District: Balotra district

Government
  - Type: Government of Rajasthan
  - Body: Gram Panchayat

Population (2011)
  - Total: 4,293

Languages
  - Official: Hindi; Marwari
- Time zone: UTC+5:30 (IST)
- Nearest city: Balotra

Sarana, Balotra is a village in Pachpadra Tehsil of Balotra district, Rajasthan with a total of 792 families residing. The Sarana village has population of 4293 of which 2298 are males while 1995 are females as per Population Census 2011.

== Notable people ==
It is the Temple of Kheteswara.
