= Kumbakonam Brahma Temple =

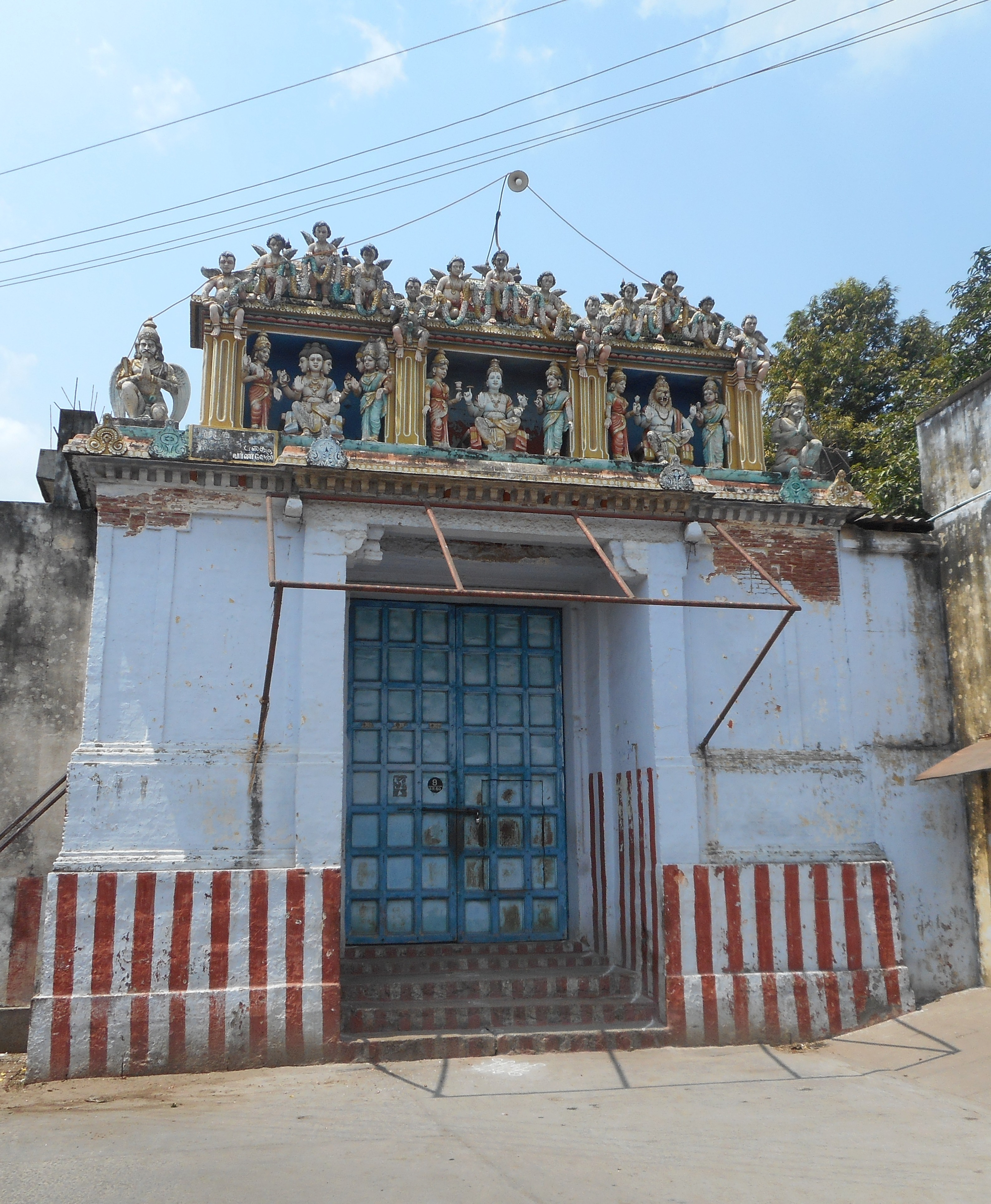
Temple entrance

Kumbakonam Brahma Temple is a Hindu temple located in Kumbakonam, Thanjavur district, Tamil Nadu, India. This temple is dedicated mainly to Vishnu, as the moolavar presiding deity, and He is known as Vedanarayanaperumal over here. His consort, Lakshmi, is known as Vedavalli.

== Significance ==
At the right side of the sanctum sanctorum Brahma is found in a separate shrine. He is flanked by Saraswati and Gayatri. At the left, Yoganarasimha is found with Sridevi and Bhoodevi.

Also, it is not the only temple dedicated to Brahma in the world, the other temple being the Brahma Temple, Pushkar, in Pushkar, in the Indian state of Rajasthan.

In addition, there is a temple dedicated to Brahma (with four faces) at Bengaluru, Karnataka.

== Speciality ==
Though the presiding deity is called as Vedanarayanaperumal, this temple is generally known as Brahma Temple.
