= Bijrol Kheda =

Village in Rajasthan

- Village
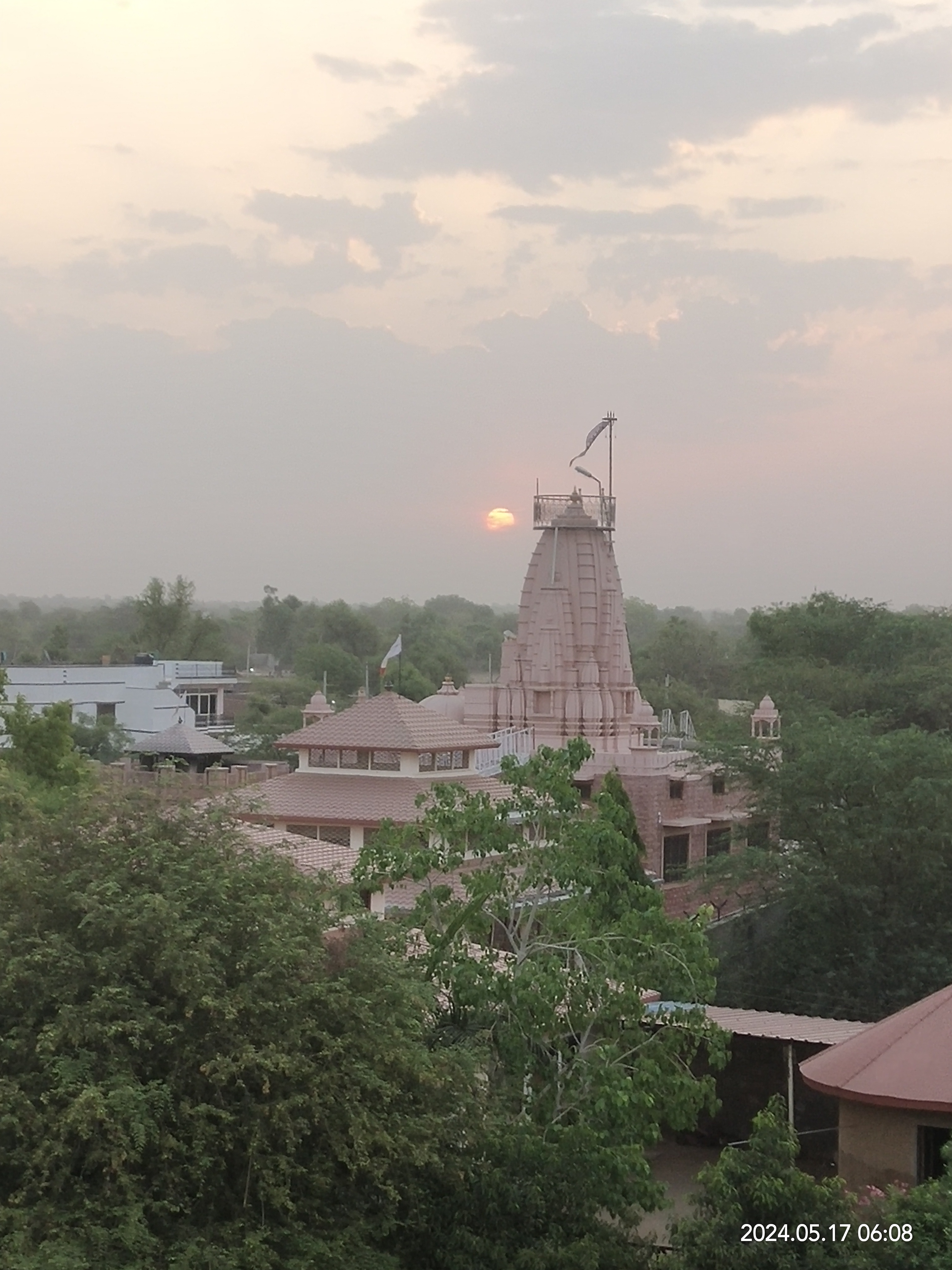
- Bijrol Kheda Temple

- Location in Rajasthan, India Bijrol Kheda (India)
- Coordinates: 24.8617351°N 71.7607749°E
- Country: India
- State: Rajasthan
- Division: Jodhpur
- District: Jalore

Population (2011)
  - Total: 2,361

Languages
  - Official: Hindi
- Time zone: UTC+5:30 (IST)
- PIN: 343041
- Vehicle registration: RJ- 46
- Nearest city: Sanchore
- Lok Sabha constituency: Jalore
- Vidhan Sabha constituency: Sanchore

Bijrol Kheda or Bijrol Khera is a village in the Indian state of Rajasthan. It is the Birthplace of Kheteswara. As of the 2011 India census, the total population of the village is 2361.

== Geography ==
Bijrol Kheda Village is nestled within the picturesque landscapes of the Jalore district, which is characterized by its arid terrain and a semi-desert environment typical of the Rajasthan region.

== Historical significance ==
=== Kheteshwar temple ===
Kheteswara was born in Vikram Samvat 1969 month Vaishakh Shukla Paksha Panchami Tithi (22 April 1912) in the village.
