= Mithrananthapuram Trimurti Temple =

Temple in Kerala, India

- Mithrananthapuram Thrimoorthy Kshetram
- Location in Kerala

Religion
- Affiliation: Hinduism
- District: Thiruvananthapuram
- Deity: Brahma, Vishnu, Shiva

Location
- Location: West Fort
- State: Kerala
- Country: India
- Interactive map of Mithrananthapuram Trimurti Temple
- Coordinates: 8°28′57″N 76°56′24″E

Architecture
- Type: Dravidian architecture (Kovil)

The Mithrananthapuram Trimurti Temple is a Hindu temple complex in Thiruvananthapuram, Kerala, India. It is a temple in where devotees get to offer worship to all the three Trimurti deities, namely, (Brahma, Vishnu and Shiva). The Temple is located on the western side of Padmanabhaswamy temple in Thiruvananthapuram.

== History ==
No authentic records are there to know the origin and antiquity of the temple. Previously this temple was a subsidiary unit of Padmanabhaswamy Temple. The administrators of Travancore kingdom used to worship in the temple before they took any important decisions pertaining to Ananthashayanam. According to Syanandura Purana, the temple was constructed in its present form in the year 1168 A.D. Historical records show that the temple was renovated in the year 1196 A.D. and some land was submitted to the deities in 1344 AD. The temple was again renovated in the year 1748 by Maharaja Marthanda Varma. Earlier, the temple was under the control of Ettara Yogam. Now temple administration is vested with the Travancore Devaswom Board. From the very beginning, the administration of this temple was jointly supervised by the Travancore kings.

== Temple complex ==
Mithrananthapuram temple complex is near the Padmanabha Swamy temple, Thiruvananthapuram, the capital city of Kerala. Inside this compound there are temples dedicated to Shiva, Vishnu and Brahma. All deities are facing east. Though initially these were under the control of Padmanabha Swamy Temple, later temple complex became independent. The priests of Anantha Padmanabha Swamy temple stay in Mithrananda Puram. The Vedic pundits who assemble in Thiruvananthapuram once in 12 years for 'Murajapam'(a customary continuous chanting of vedic mantras), stay in this compound.

The path inside the complex leads to the three temples. First there is a Vishnu temple with a Garuda statue just outside. The idol is in a standing posture and carries Conch, wheel, mace and lotus flower in his four hands. Ashtami Rohini, the birth day of Krishna is celebrated here. In front of the main granite idol is a small metallic one, which is believed to be the idol which was worshiped by Sage Vilwamangalam Swamiyar.

Next to the Vishnu temple is the temple for Shiva. In the south western corner of this temple there is a Ganesha temple also. Maha Shivaratri is celebrated as the main festival in this temple. Vasordhara Homam the most sacred sacrifice to fire, scarifying dhara for the welfare of this entire society under the guidance of Brahmins.This sacred sacrifice is done during Shivaratri festival. Next to the Shiva temple is a temple for Nagaraja.

Slightly behind the Vishnu temple is the Brahma temple. Temples of Brahma are very rare in India. The Brahma statue is made of stone, in sitting posture and has only one head instead of the four. Inside the Brahma temple, there is a small Ganesha temple along with his wives. The main form of worship in this Ganesha temple is to cover the idol with Appam. There is a belief that this temple for Brahma was consecrated here to ward off a Yakshi who was troubling everybody. Though in the initial days, women were not allowed in this temple, but now with some restrictions, they are allowed.

The Mithrananthapuram temple complex includes the Mithrananthapuram tank, in which the priests of Padmanabhaswamy Temple are expected to bath each day before entering the temple.

== Legend ==
Legend says that Villwamangalath Swamiyar consecrated the idols of the temple. It is also believed that the Trimurtis conducted a great fire yajna here, to the Sun God, Mithra, thus the complex is known as Mithrananthapuram, 'the town which gave happiness to the Sun'.

== See also ==
- List of Hindu temples in Kerala
- Triple deities
- Elephanta Caves
