= Udesh =

Udesh is a Sinhalese masculine given name. Notable people with the name include:

- Udesh Perera (born 1985), Sri Lankan cricketer
- Udesh Shrestha (born 1981), Nepali pop singer, music composer, and songwriter
