= Thripaya Trimurti Temple =

Hindu temple in Thrissur district, Kerala, India

- Thripaya Trimurti Temple, Vellookkara, Irinjalakuda, Thrissur, Kerala

Religion
- Affiliation: Hinduism
- District: Thrissur
- Deity: Shiva, Vishnu, Brahma

Location
- Location: Vellookkara, Irinjalakuda
- State: Kerala
- Country: India
- Interactive map of Thripaya Trimurti Temple
- Coordinates: 10°19′38″N 76°13′09″E

Architecture
- Type: Architecture of Kerala

Specifications
- Temple: One
- Elevation: 29.42 m (97 ft)

Thripaya Trimurti Temple is a Hindu temple in Irinjalakuda, Thrissur in Kerala, India. It is one among the rare temples in the world where the Trimurti sit in one pedestal in one sanctum sanctorum. With Brahma on the left, Shiva in the centre and Vishnu in the right, the Hindu triad representing the three primal aspects of Parabrahma (Almighty God), Creation-Destruction-Preservation.

== Legend ==
The legend says that there was a very learned and pious namboodiri who happened to visit Irinjalakuda 'Sree Koodalmanikyam' Temple. He had a precious holy shell with him into which the spirit of almost all gods and goddesses were invoked and kept. When he tried to invoke the spirit of the deity at Koodalmanikyam temple, the shell fell down and broke into pieces. The combined power thus emerged into the Mandapa.

He was very disappointed and sad and traveled south to meet 'Kodungallooramma'. On his way Brahma, Vishnu and Paramasiva appeared before him to shower their blessings on him. The spot was called Nadavaramba on the bank of fresh water lake. The name attributed as 'Thiruprika' got modifiedinto ‘Thrippayya’ in course of time.
