= Jethu Singh Rajpurohit =

Indian politician (1921–2011)

- Born: August 23, 1921
- Died: August 23, 2011 (aged 90)
- Occupation: Politician
- Office: Sarpanch of Barwa
- Political party: Indian National Congress
- Parent: Samarth Singhji Rajpurohit (father)

Jethu Singhji Rajpurohit (23 August 1921 – 23 August 2011) was an Indian politician and member of the Indian National Congress from Bali, Rajasthan. He was the first sarpanch in the Rajpurohit community He was the Sarpanch of Barwa, a village in Pali district of Rajasthan, and later was elected as pradhan from Bali panchayat samiti. He served as a sarpanch for 30 years and was Pradhan for 5 years. He fought 1990 assembly elections from Bali and claimed 18604 votes, but lost to Amrutlal Parmar with a near margin of 184 votes.

== Personal ==
Jethu Singhji Rajpurohit was the youngest of the three sons of Samarth Singhji Rajpurohit, a farmer.
