= Kheteswara =

North-western Rajasthan's notable saint

Aradhya Sant Shiromani Shree 1008 Khetaramji Maharaj Kheteshwar "Khetaramji Maharaj"
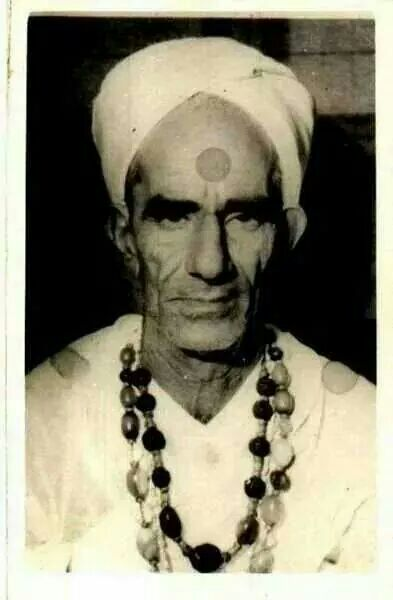
- Kheteshwar Maharaj

Personal life
- Born: Khet Singh; 22 April 1912 Bijrol Kheda, Sanchor, Rajasthan
- Died: 7 May 1984 (aged 72) Asotra Village, Balotra district, India
- Parent(s): Sher Singh (Father); Shingari Devi (Mother)

Religious life
- Religion: Hinduism

Religious career
- Teacher: Ganesha Nand Ji
- Website: https://brahmdhamtirth.org/

Sant Shree 1008 Kheteshwar Ji (22 April 1912 – 7 May 1984) is a noted saint of Rajasthan. He belonged to the Rajpurohit community. He became a sanyasin at age 12.

His ishta-devata was Brahma. He preached non-violence, chastity, high moral values and conservation of natural resources. He revitalized the importance of spiritual means to achieve self-realization and emphasizing humanity above all other man-made barriers like casteism. He founded the second largest temple of Brahma and named it Brahmadham at village Asotra near Balotra in Barmer district in Rajasthan, which second only to the Pushkar temple of Brahma. This is only temple, where Brahma is with his consort Savitri. He empowered the Rajpurohit community by making them realize to work for creating a better community and society. While doing pran-pratishtha ceremony of idols of the temple, Khetheswaraji, he realized, the time has come to leave his earthly body. So, he informed his followers of the same. He took "Samadhi" in name of Lord Brahma on 7 May 1984, a day after the temple was inaugurated by him at Asotra, Rajasthan near the temple and after some months, the white Female Horse which rode, also took samadhi near him.

There are many followers and temples of him have been built after his death in various towns of Rajasthan by the Rajpurohit community. Every year annual fair and ceremonies are also held on his birth anniversary.

== Early life ==
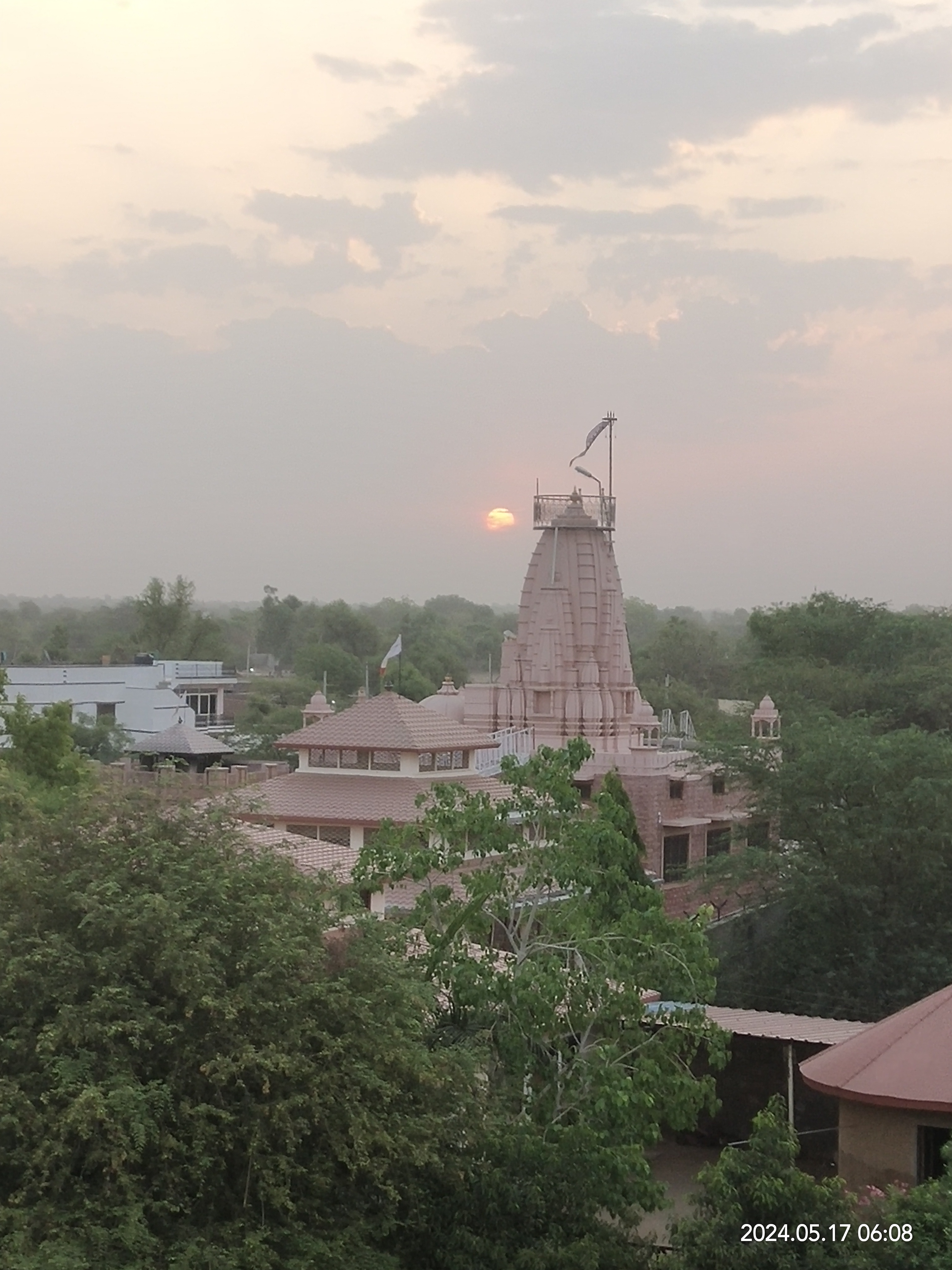
Birthplace of Kheteswara (Bijrol Kheda)

Khetaramji Maharaj, named Khet Singh at birth, was born in Vikram Samvat 1969 month Vaishakh Shukla Paksha Panchami Tithi (22 April 1912), Monday on 22 April 1912 at a place called Bijrol Kheda in Sanchore district. His father's name was Shri Shersinghji and his mother's name was Mrs. Singari Devi, who were originally residents of Sarana village of Pachpadra tehsil of Barmer district.

Sarana is a Rajpurohit dominated village where Shersinghji of Udalak Rishi clan, Udich (Udesh) gotra resided in Sarana.In those days famine was common in Marwar. In such a situation, people used to migrate in search of employment for livelihood. Shri Shersinghji along with his family lived on the agricultural well of Meghaji Chaudhary in Bijraul Kheda and did agricultural work. There were two sons in his family, Shri Bhomaramji and Hukamaramji and as the third child, Khetaram was born later. It is said that that year there was good rainfall in Sanchaur pargana and abundant crops were produced in the area. Then after some time Shersinghji's family again settled in their native village Sarana.

Khetaramji Maharaj's parents died when he was a child. But being the youngest among three brothers, he received a lot of pampering in the family.

== Dedication to God ==
Child Khetaram had full interest and faith in bhajan, kirtan, and devotion since childhood. Khetaram used to reach wherever Jagran-Kirtan was held with great reverence and listen to bhajans and sermons. In his teenage years, Khetaram used to graze cows and bulls and help in agricultural work. There was always a passion for Ram-naam in his mind. Due to lack of time during the day, after tying the bull to a peg at night and retiring from food, etc., when the family members would go to sleep, Khetaram would go to Saiji's Beri every night to perform bhajan kirtan. The next morning, he would again be busy grazing cows and doing agricultural work as per their daily routine.

Sai ji Maharaj was pleased with the devotion and faith of child Khetaram and one day thought of testing Khetaram and told him that “you should come here at night through a difficult path through the bushes, this place is surrounded by hills, and dangerous animals also live in the middle, so take care of yourself”. Khetaram also laughed and answered this question “what harm can a violent animal do to someone who has the blessing of a powerful Guru on his head?"

One night of Chaumasa, the sky was covered with dense clouds and lightning was flashing intermittently, but Khetaram had to go to Saiji's Beri for bhajan, so he left the house at night. He was almost about to reach there when suddenly he felt something unusual in the middle of the way, his steps stopped, and there was silence all around. Suddenly thunder started coming from the sky along with bright flashes of lightning. In the light of the lightning, Khetaram saw that a tiger was sitting on the road. But Khetaram did not panic at all and in the next moment he bowed down before the tiger. Just then Saiji Maharaj's voice came. When Khetaramji looked up, Saiji Maharaj was standing there laughing and saying, "Son, you have passed the test"(One of the eight Siddhis is that the seeker can transmit his life to another being).

The senior people of Sarana village felt that the boy Khetaram was singing hymns and restraint to the fakirs while grazing cows with great harmony and devotion. They felt that this was not for any ordinary child. Hence they raised the child Khetaram. So after some days, they noticed that at night when everyone slept, Khetaram used to go out somewhere and the wind was blowing strong. When they told this to his brothers, they did not pay much attention.

Khetaram sometimes used to discuss spirituality and astrological knowledge with Pandit Bhavanishankar of Sarana village. One morning he decided to go to Panditji's house. Went there and requested Panditji to bring a pot of water to wash his hands. Pandit ji brought water and when Khetaram was washing his hands, Panditji saw that there were strange circles on the fingers of the child's hands. Panditji made Khetaram sit inside and asked calmly, "Brother Khetaram, I want to see your hands". When Panditji saw Khetaram's hands, the palmist Panditji was very surprised to see that there were chakras on all the fingers of Khetaram's hands. Then Panditji told Khetaram that the person who has the full ten Chakras in both his hands is Chakravarti. Becomes an emperor or becomes a great yogi/ascetic. Then Khetaram said with great respect that Pandit ji, "Why would one who does farming and cow grazing become a Chakravarti(great) emperor? Yes, I like devotion very much." Time passed and one day Young Khetaram told his family members that he should be allowed to become a complete devotee of god means a Tapasvi. The family members did not pay attention to Khetaram's demand and ignored him.

=== Engagement ===
To bind Khetaram in worldly bonds, Khetaram's engagement was fixed to a Siha family of Bhindakuan village. Khetaram was worried about this. The family members were not listening to him and his entire time was spent in devotion to God.

When no member of his family was ready to listen to Khetaram about his worldly renunciation, one day he got angry and drank a bottle of kerosene and at night he locked himself in his room and slept from inside. The family members requested a lot but the room was not opened. In such a situation, all the family members got worried and prayed to God in pain throughout the night, they decided that if nothing harm happened to Khetaram today, they would allow him to do the devotion as per his wish.

The next morning, at sunrise, all the family members were sitting in the courtyard, when Khetaramj came out of the room, silent but healthy. The family considered this a divine miracle and agreed to dedicate Khetaram to God as per his wish.

After getting permission from the family, Khetaram thought that it was necessary to make the girl to whom he was engaged a religious sister. Khetaram blessed the girl to whom he was engaged, covered her with 'Chunari' and addressed her with the word 'sister'. This event became a topic of discussion in the entire village and within a few days in the entire area because this had never happened before.

After a few days, he left home and became a monk.

== Ascetic life ==
=== Company of Guru Ganeshanandji ===
Freed from worldly bondage, Khetaramji Maharaj lived in Saiji's house, where one day the most revered and prominent Guru Ganeshanandji Maharaj had come. Inspired by the devotional spirit of young Khetaram, Ganeshanandji said that Khetaram, now you should make someone your guru. Then Saiji Maharaj said that where would Khetaram find a Guru more capable than you, so you should accept him as your disciple, Maharaj.

Then it is said that Guru Guneshanandji Maharaj himself made Khetaram perform the Rishi Karma on the bank of Yamuna river in Delhi and initiated Khetaram as a Sanyasi according to the customs.

=== Peepaliya Tapasya ===
After leaving his family life and doing penance to attain God as a Sanyasi, Khetaramji Maharaj first chose a place called Peepaliya situated on the outskirts of Asotra village near Saiji Ki Beri and performed rigorous Tapsya there for twelve years where people from all communities from the surrounding area would come, bhajans and kirtans would be performed and at night, as in the mountain range situated between Saiji ki Beri and Pipliya, tigers, and leopards would roar, but Khetaramji Maharaj engrossed in devotion to God, continued to perform penance. There is a temple of Maa Jagadamba in the nearby Bambaral mountains where people go for worship.

=== Samadri Tapsadhana ===
Khetaramji Maharaj meditated for 12 years while living at a place near Loco Colony in Samdari, which is known as Khetaramji's baag. During the day, he used to do tapasya by sitting under a Khejri tree in a field near Maukhandi village, three kilometers away from the baag. At night people from all communities of the area would come for darshan and a satsang program would take place.

=== Performing tapasya on Garh Siwana and Muthali pond ===
After Samdari, Khetaramji Maharaj did tapasya for six months in the ancient Ramdev temple located at Garh Siwana and then did tapasya for six months at the pond of Muthali village. Where one day some forest dwellers were going to sacrifice a goat at the Devi place on the occasion of Navratri.

When Maharaj ji came to know about this, he explained to those forest dwellers that God gives life and does not take anyone's life. Therefore, leave this silent creature, otherwise, it will take revenge on you in the next life as per destiny. It is said that since then the forest dwellers stopped sacrificing animals. Then Khetaramji got title "Data" or "Datashree" mean a donor.

== Construction of Asotra temple ==
After doing sadhana at Muthali pond, Khetaramji Maharaj later established a monastery where present Brahmadham is located, where Virdaramji Mahant lived, where Khetaramji Maharaj started devotion to Lord Brahma.

Maharaj ji had a special divine experience at this place, due to which today this place is revered in the country and the world as the Brahmadham of the Rajpurohit society. Datashree wanted to organize the Rajpurohit community, from this point of view the location of this place in Asotra, which is almost in the middle of the Rajpurohit-dominated districts of Rajasthan, might have been a reason which this place was selected. Vikram Samvat 2018 month Vaishakh Shukla Paksha Panchami Tithi, on Thursday, 20 April 1961, the foundation stone of Brahmadham was laid by Khetaramji. For the construction of the temple, Datashree kept traveling from village to village and traveling far away on horseback. Shri Padmaramji Sodha of Gudanal used to keep track of the income and expenditure of money. Whenever Maharaj ji returned to Dham after his stay, he used to take out all the money from his bag and give it to Padmaramji who deposited it in the records and paid off the liabilities. The temple of Brahmaji was completely completed. The auspicious time was fixed for consecrating Lord Brahma with Savitri in the Garbhgraha, which was fixed for Vikram Samvat 2041 month Vaishakh Shukla Panchami, Thursday, corresponding date 06.05.1984. Preparations started in full swing. Saints were invited from all over the country. Invitation notices were sent to each village. Beautiful lights and umbrellas started shining on the Dham. The offerings of the people started increasing and finally the moment came when the pundits, amidst the chanting of Vedic mantras, consecrated Brahmaji along with Savitri in their respective temple.

=== Excavation of Brahmasarovar ===
Khetaramji Maharaj decided to build a big lake near Brahmadham, similar to the structure in Pushkarraj. Maharajji got the excavation done with great dedication at the place where the lake is situated today. Mahara ji used to sit there under the Khejri tree during the day when many devotees would gather for darshan, then Datashree himself would get up and start digging the lake. In such a situation, the devotees present would take the bucket and spade from the hands of Maharaj ji and they would contribute for some time in the digging.

A canal of about one kilometer was also constructed for the inflow of water into the lake.

=== Construction of idol ===
It is said that Maharajji himself had come to Jaipur to make a life-size idol for Brahma, and Sompura Bandhu to whom he had given the work of making the idol, started the work but the idol broke. Then he started the work for the second time by taking the stone, but the same incident happened to them, then they sent the news to Maharajji that the idol was being destroyed, then Maharajji convinced Mother Savitri ji with his divine vision because Lord Brahma himself was cursed by the curse of Savitri. It was in the curse of Savitri that Lord Brahma would not be worshiped in Kaliyuga due to the incident that took place in Pushkar during the creation of the 12th Kalpa by Lord Brahma. Khetaramji pacified Mother Savitri ji with his divine yoga and sent orders to start the work of carving the idol from Makrana stone again. Sompura Bandhu followed the orders of Datashree and completed the work of making the idols of Lord Brahma and Savitriji.

Marble is used to build Shri Brahma ji's idol. The carving job, on the other hand, is one-of-a-kind. The temple's foundation was laid on April 20, 1961, but the deity was not enthroned until May 6, 1984. The idol is a one-of-a-kind sculptural masterpiece. Various vedic sages’ idols can be found like Maharishi Uddalak, Maharishi Vashishta, Maharishi Kashyap, Maharishi Gautam, Maharishi Pippalada, Maharishi Parashara, and Maharishi Bhardwaj,

== Shrikheteshwar Brahmadham Teerth Asotra Trust ==
After the construction of the temple, a trust was formed for the works and future development of the temple. This trust looks after the development and cultural and temple-building activities of the society. The Trust has constructed temples, Gurukuls, Schools, Hostels, Hospitals, and Dharamshalas at various places and many social development works are still being carried out.

=== Kheteshwar Temple ===
When Maharaj ji died, a few years later, Kheteshwara temple was built in Asotra by the society and trust. Even today, temples of Guru Kheteshwar have been built in many places and states.

== Legacy ==
Khetaramji became famous as a popular saint among the people of Rajasthan. He is known as Guru of Rajpurohit society and people of all communities have deep faith in him mostly marwari. They respects him as their Kulguru. Apart from Marwar region, his temples are in places like Pune, Bengaluru, Mumbai, Chennai, Delhi, Haridwar, Ahmedabad, Surat, Nashik, Hyderabad etc.
