= Asotra =

Village in Rajasthan, India

- Village
- Location in Balotra Rajasthan India Asotra (India)
- Coordinates: 25.83°N 72.23°E
- Country: India
- State: Rajasthan
- District: Balotra

Population (2011)
  - Total: 4,496
- Time zone: UTC+5:30 (भारतीय मानक समय)
- दूरभाष कोड: 02988
- Vehicle registration: RJ-39

Asotra is a village located in Balotra district of Rajasthan, near the city of Balotra which is at a distance of 10 km. Pachpadra is 17 km to the north, Umarlai is 17 km to the north-east and Meli is 18 km to the east of Asotra. Balotra Junction Railway Station is the nearest railhead. Jodhpur Airport at a distance of 100 km, serves Asotra. It is the site of world's second Brahma Temple, Asotra built by the saint Kheteswara.

== Temple ==
Brahma is the first of the Hindu trinity called the Trimurti, the other two being Vishnu and Shiva. He is the god of creation. The temple at Asotra is one of the two prominent temples of the deity, along with Pushkar. The yellow (golden stone) of Jaisalmer was used in the construction of main entrance hall. The rest of the temple is made of Jodhpur Stone (Chhitar Stone). The idol of Brahma is made of marble.

The foundation of the temple was laid on 20 April 1961, and the idol was consecrated on 6 May 1984. Along with the image of Brahma, his consort Gayatri's idol is present beside it. There are also idols of various Vedic sages in Uddalaka, Vashishta, Kashyapa, Gautama, Pippalada, Parashara, and Bhardvaja. Rajpurohit Brahmins trace their vedic lineage from these sages. The temple has been built mainly by the Rajpurohit community. The vast lodge can house hundreds of visitors in its 102 rooms and 11 halls. The present Mahant (manager priest) of the temple is Sant Tulsaram ji Maharaj. An education institution, in the name of Sant Khetaram ji Maharaj is run here. Free charitable preparation of food is performed every day which is served to visitors and devotees much like the langar pratha common among Sikhs. A well managed kine house (gaushala) houses 350 cows.
