= Brahma Kuti Temple =

Hindu Temple in Uttar Pradesh, India

Brahma Kuti's temple is a temple near Kanpur, India dedicated to Brahma. It is the only Brahma temple in the area other than the small temple of Brahmeswar Mahadeva on the Brahmavarta ghat. It is located on the bank of the River Ganga.
