= Brahma =

Creator god in Hinduism

- Creator of the Universe; God of Creation, Knowledge and the Vedas
- Member of the Trimurti
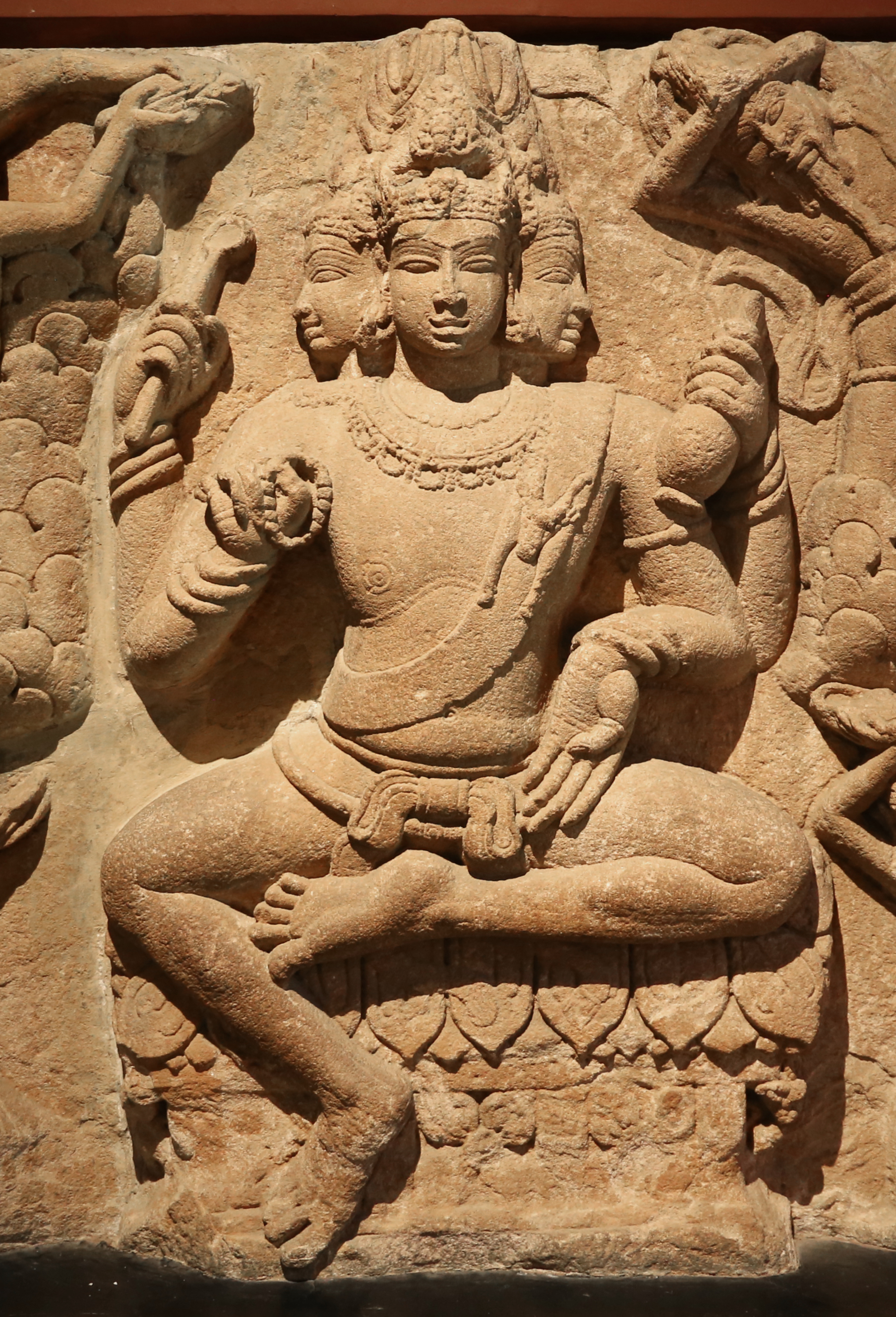
- Sculpture of Brahma, sixth-century CE
- Other names: Svayambhu, Virinchi, Prajapati
- Devanagari: ब्रह्मा
- Sanskrit transliteration: Brahmā
- Affiliation: Deva; Trimurti
- Abode: Brahmaloka
- Mantra: ॐ वेदात्मनाय विद्महे हिरण्यगर्भाय धीमही तन्नो ब्रह्मा प्रचोदयात्: Oṃ vedātmanāya vidmahe hiraṇyagarbhāya dhīmahī tan no brahmā pracodayāt; ॐ ब्रह्मणे नम: Om Brahmane Namah
- Weapon: Brahmastra; Brahmashirastra
- Symbol: Lotus, Vedas, Japamala, Kamandalu
- Mount: Hamsa
- Festivals: Kartik Purnima

Genealogy
- Consort: Savitri (identified with Sarasvati or Gayatri)
- Children: Mind-created children including: Agni; Ahalya; Angiras; Atri; Bhrigu; Chitragupta; Daksha; Himavan; Jambavan; Kamadeva; Kratu; Kumaras; Marichi; Narada; Pulaha; Pulastya; Shatarupa; Svayambhuva Manu; Vashishtha

Brahma (Sanskrit: ब्रह्मा, IAST: Brahmā) is a Hindu god known as "the Creator" within the Trimurti, the trinity of supreme divinity that includes Vishnu and Shiva. He is associated with the creation of the universe, knowledge, and the Vedas. Brahma is prominently mentioned in creation legends. According to some Puranas, he created himself in a golden embryo known as the Hiranyagarbha.

Brahma is frequently identified with the Vedic deity Prajapati. During the post-Vedic period, Brahma was a prominent deity with his own followers; however, his popularity had decreased by the 7th century. He was also overshadowed by other major deities like Vishnu, Shiva, and Mahadevi over time and was considered a secondary creator, who was created by the major deities.

Brahma is commonly shown as a bearded man with red or golden skin, four heads and four hands. His four heads represent the four Vedas and face the four main directions. He is seated on a lotus and his mount (vahana) is a swan, goose or crane (hamsa). According to scriptures, Brahma created his children from his mind, which is why they are referred to as Manasaputra.

In modern-day Hinduism, Brahma is not widely worshiped and has substantially less importance than Vishnu and Shiva who are the two other members of the Trimurti. Brahma is revered in ancient texts, yet is rarely worshiped as a primary deity in India due to the absence of any significant sect dedicated to his reverence. Few temples dedicated to him exist in India, with the most famous being the Brahma Temple, Pushkar in Rajasthan. Some Brahma temples are found outside India, like the Erawan Shrine in Bangkok, which has become very popular among the Thai Buddhist community.

== Origin and meaning ==
=== Etymology ===
The origins of the name brahmā is unclear, partly because several related words appear in Vedic literature, such as Brahman for the 'Ultimate Reality' and Brāhmaṇa for 'priest'.

=== Brahma and Brahman ===
In Hinduism, the difference between the spiritual idea of brahman and the god Brahmā is that that brahman is a genderless abstract metaphysical idea, whereas Brahmā is one of the many masculine gods in Hindu tradition. The spiritual idea of brahman is quite old and some scholars suggest that the god Brahma may have emerged as a god and visible icon of the impersonal universal principle of brahman. The existence of a distinct god named Brahma is evidenced in late Vedic texts.

=== Sanskrit grammar ===
In Sanskrit grammar, the nominal word stem Brahma- has two distinct forms:

1. The neuter noun bráhman, whose nominative singular form is brahma (ब्रह्म)
2. The masculine noun brahmán, whose nominative singular form is brahmā (ब्रह्मा)

The former, the neuter form, has a generalized and abstract meaning while the latter, the masculine form, is used as the proper name of the deity Brahma.However, Brahman was sometimes used as a synonym for Brahma's name during the time the Mahabharata was written.

== Literature and legends ==
=== Vedic literature ===
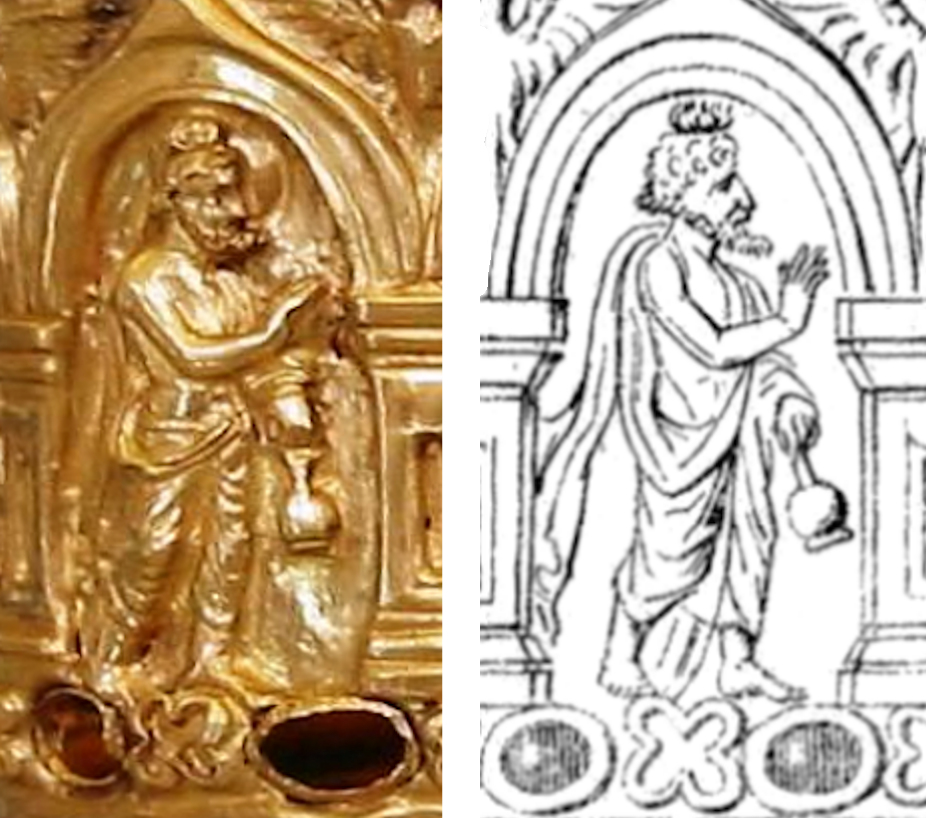
An early depiction of Brahma, on the Bimaran casket, early 1st century CE. British Museum.

One of the earliest mentions of Brahma alongside Vishnu and Shiva is in the fifth Prapathaka (lesson) of the Maitrayaniya Upanishad, composed around the late 1st millennium BCE. Brahma is first discussed in verse 5.1 (known as the Kutsayana Hymn), and then further discussed in verse 5.2.

In the pantheistic Kutsayana Hymn (verse 5.1), the Upanishad states that one's Soul is Brahman, and this Ultimate Reality, Cosmic Universal or God is within each living being. It equates the atman (Soul, Self) within to be Brahma and various alternate manifestations of Brahman, as follows, "Thou art Brahma, thou art Vishnu, thou art Shiva, thou art Agni, Varuna, Vayu, Indra, thou art All."

In verse 5.2, Brahma, Vishnu, Shiva are mapped into the theory of Guṇas which are qualities, psyche and innate tendencies that can be found in all living beings. This chapter of the Maitrayaniya Upanishad states that the universe emerged from darkness (tamas), first as passion characterized by innate quality (rajas), which then refined and differentiated into purity and goodness (sattva). Of these three qualities, rajas are then mapped to Brahma, as follows:

Now then, that part of him which belongs to tamas, that, O students of sacred knowledge (Brahmacharins), is this Shiva.
That part of him which belongs to rajas, that O students of sacred knowledge, is this Brahma.
That part of him which belongs to sattva, that O students of sacred knowledge, is this Vishnu.
Verily, that One became threefold, became eightfold, elevenfold, twelvefold, into infinite fold.
This Being (neuter) entered all beings, he became the overlord of all beings.
That is the Atman (Soul, Self) within and without – yea, within and without!

— Maitrayaniya Upanishad, 5.2,, Maitrayaniya Upanishad

While the Maitrayaniya Upanishad links Brahma with one of the elements of the guṇas theory of Hinduism, it does not present him as one of the trifunctional elements of the Hindu Trimurti idea found in later Puranic literature.

=== Post-Vedic literature ===
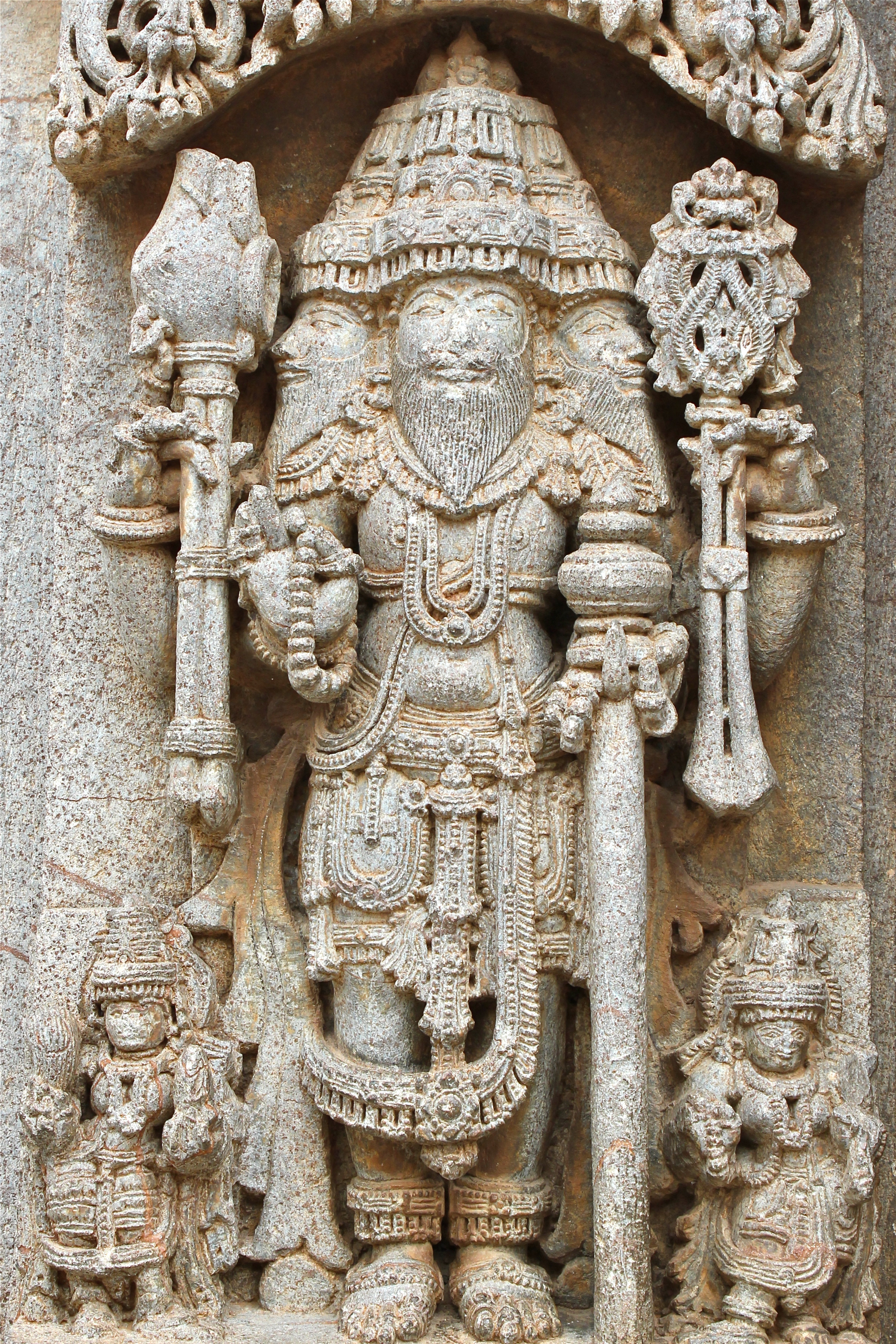
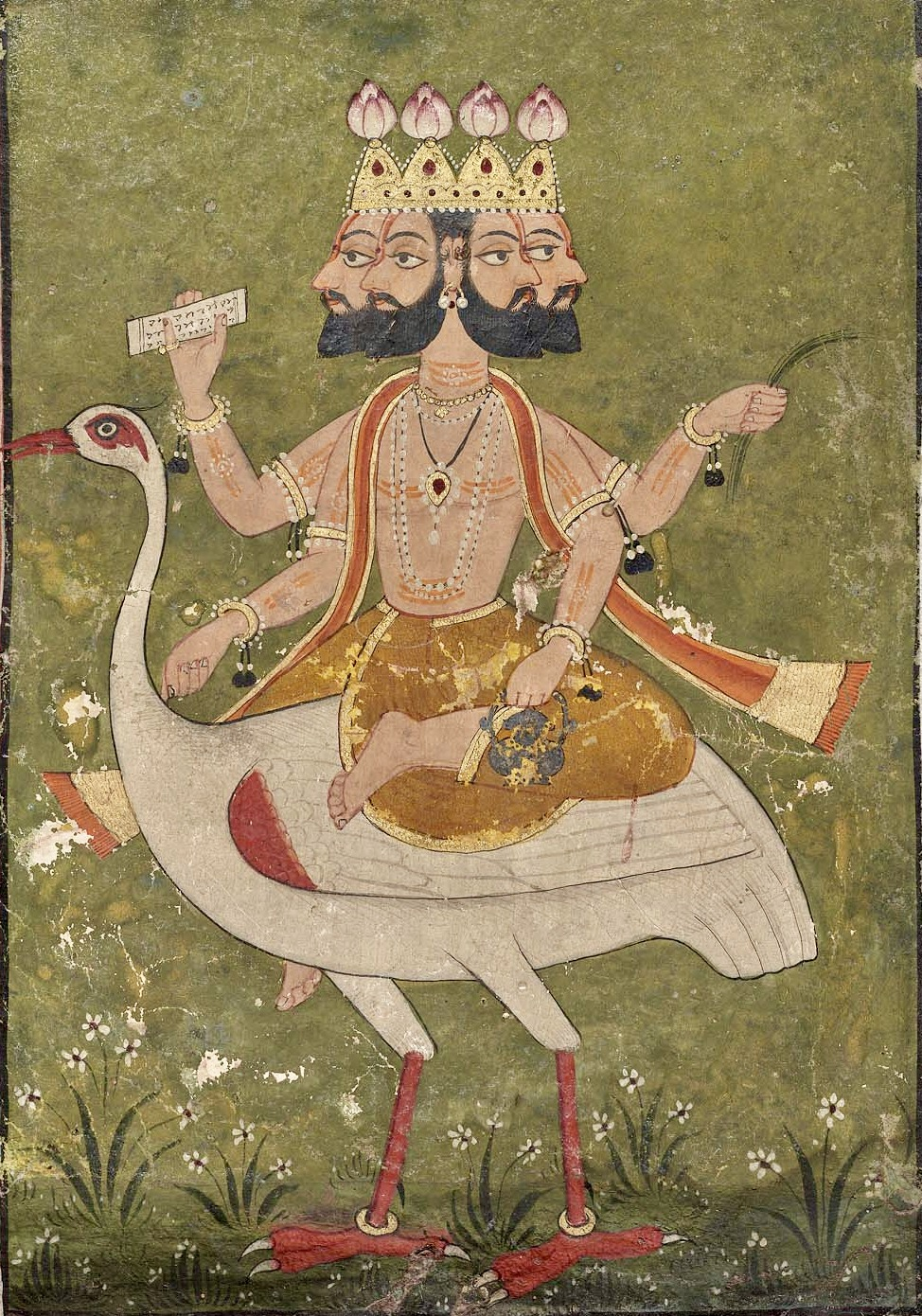
Left: Brahma at the 12th century CE Chennakesava Temple, Somanathapura; Right: Painting depicting Brahma on a Hamsa, c. 1700 CE

==== Origins, prominence and decline ====
During the post-Vedic period, Brahma was a prominent god, and his sect existed from the 2nd century CE to the 6th century CE. Early texts like the Brahmanda Purana describe that there was nothing but an eternal ocean. From this, a golden egg called Hiranyagarbha, emerged. The egg broke open and Brahma, who had created himself within it, came into existence (gaining the name Svayambhu). Then, he created the universe and the earth as well as other things. He also created people to populate and live on his creation.

However, by the 7th century CE, Brahma lost his importance. Historians believe that some of the major reasons for Brahma's downfall were the rise of Shaivism and Vaishnavism, their replacement of him with Mahadevi in the Smarta tradition, and the frequent attacks by Buddhists, Jains, Hindus who worship Shiva and Vishnu.

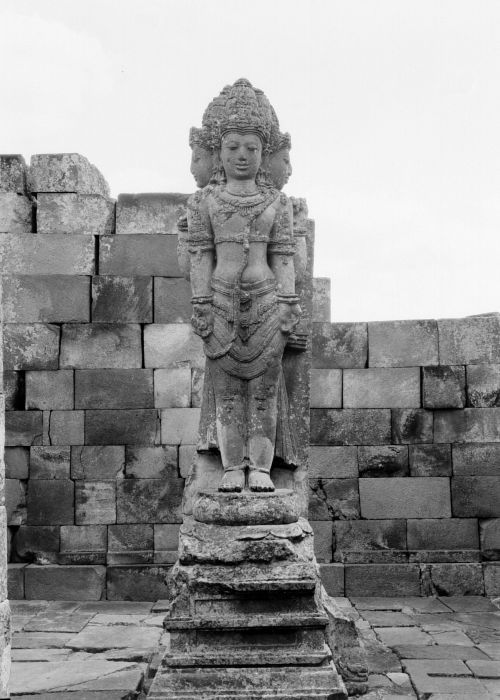
Sculpture of Brahma in Prambanan, Java Indonesia

=== Legends explaining Brahma's decline ===
Various Puranic legends mention reasons for the decline in Brahma's worship. There are primarily two prominent versions of why Brahma lost his popular standing:

1. The Shiva Purana version is where Brahma and Vishnu argued about who was the greatest among them. Whilst debating, they saw a huge column of fire piercing through the sky, which was Shiva as Lingodbhava. Brahman and Vishnu decided to locate the beginning and end of this column of fire. Vishnu assumed the form of a boar (Varaha) and journeyed towards the earth, whilst Brahma assumed the form of a swan (Hamsa) and journeyed towards the sky. Vishnu found about his defeat, revealing that he had been unable to locate the end, which was at the end of the universe and he got tired before he reached that so he was defeated in it there. However, Brahma had recruited the ketaki flower which fell from Shiva's head by his powers to end the debate here now, which was at the beginning of the universe with his beginning at there now and he got tired before he reached that so he was defeated in it there and this came to him and he took him as a false witness to support his lie that he had located the beginning. Shiva then took his true form and cut off one of Brahma's five heads for his dishonesty, proclaiming that he would no longer receive an active following to his worship and would get a low status of popularity. Pleased with Vishnu's honesty, he offered him a high status of popularity and an active following dedicated to his worship and took the ketaki flower as an ornament on his head then and fused that head into him then.
2. The Vishnu Purana version where Vishnu created Brahma and Shiva from his navel and forehead respectively, thus making Brahma along with Shiva both as inferior to Vishnu, who created them both as the supreme god above them in all aspects of power in this universe and after that, when the creation of the universe was completed, Brahma lost all of his importance after his role as creator of the universe ended and was removed from worship by everyone in the world, while Shiva was always worshipped as the destroyer of the universe after his role of the destruction of the universe was always happening and Vishnu was always worshipped as he was the preserver of the universe and his preserving role in the universe was always happening and he was the supreme god of this universe.

=== Cosmogony and creation ===
The post-Vedic texts of Hinduism offer multiple theories of cosmogony, many involving Brahma. These include Sarga (primary creation of the universe) and Visarga (secondary creation), which are ideas related to the Indian thought that there are two levels of reality, one primary that is unchanging (metaphysical) and other secondary that is always changing (empirical). All observed reality of the latter (empirical) is in an endlessly repeating cycle of existence, where the cosmos and life we experience are continually created, evolved, dissolved and then re-created. The primary creator is extensively discussed in Vedic cosmogonies, with Brahman, or Purusha, or Prakrti among the terms used for the primary creator. In contrast, Vedic and post-Vedic texts name different gods and goddesses as secondary creators (often Brahma in post-Vedic texts), and in some cases a different god or goddess as the secondary creator at the start of each cosmic cycle (kalpa, that is an aeon).

Brahma is descrived as a "secondary creator" in the Mahabharata and Puranas, and is among the most studied and described. Vishnu-focused Puranas describe that Brahma was born from a lotus emerging from the navel of the god Vishnu, and Shiva was born from a fire emerging from the forehead of the god Vishnu. In contrast, the Shiva-focused Puranas describe Brahma and Vishnu as being born from Shiva's right and left sides of his waist; in other Puranas, Shiva and Vishnu were born from Brahma's right and left sides of his waist, or Vishnu, Shiva, and Brahma create each other cyclically in different aeons (kalpas). Yet others describe that the Tridevi created Brahma, Vishnu, and Shiva, and these texts then state that Brahma is a secondary creator of the world working respectively on their behalf. Brahma creates all the forms in the universe, but not the primordial universe itself. Thus, in most Puranic texts, Brahma's creative activity depends on the presence and power of a higher god or higher goddess. Additionally, the medieval era texts of these major theistic traditions of Hinduism assert that the saguna (representation with face and attributes) Brahma is Vishnu, Shiva, or Tridevi, respectively.

In the post-Vedic Puranic literature, Brahma creates, but neither preserves nor destroys anything. He is envisioned in some Hindu texts to have emerged from the metaphysical Brahman along with Vishnu (preserver), Shiva (destroyer), all other deities, matter and other beings. In theistic schools of Hinduism where the deity Brahma is described as part of its cosmology, he is a mortal god like all deities and dissolves into the abstract immortal Brahman when the universe ends, and then a new cosmic cycle (kalpa) restarts and all of them are recreated.

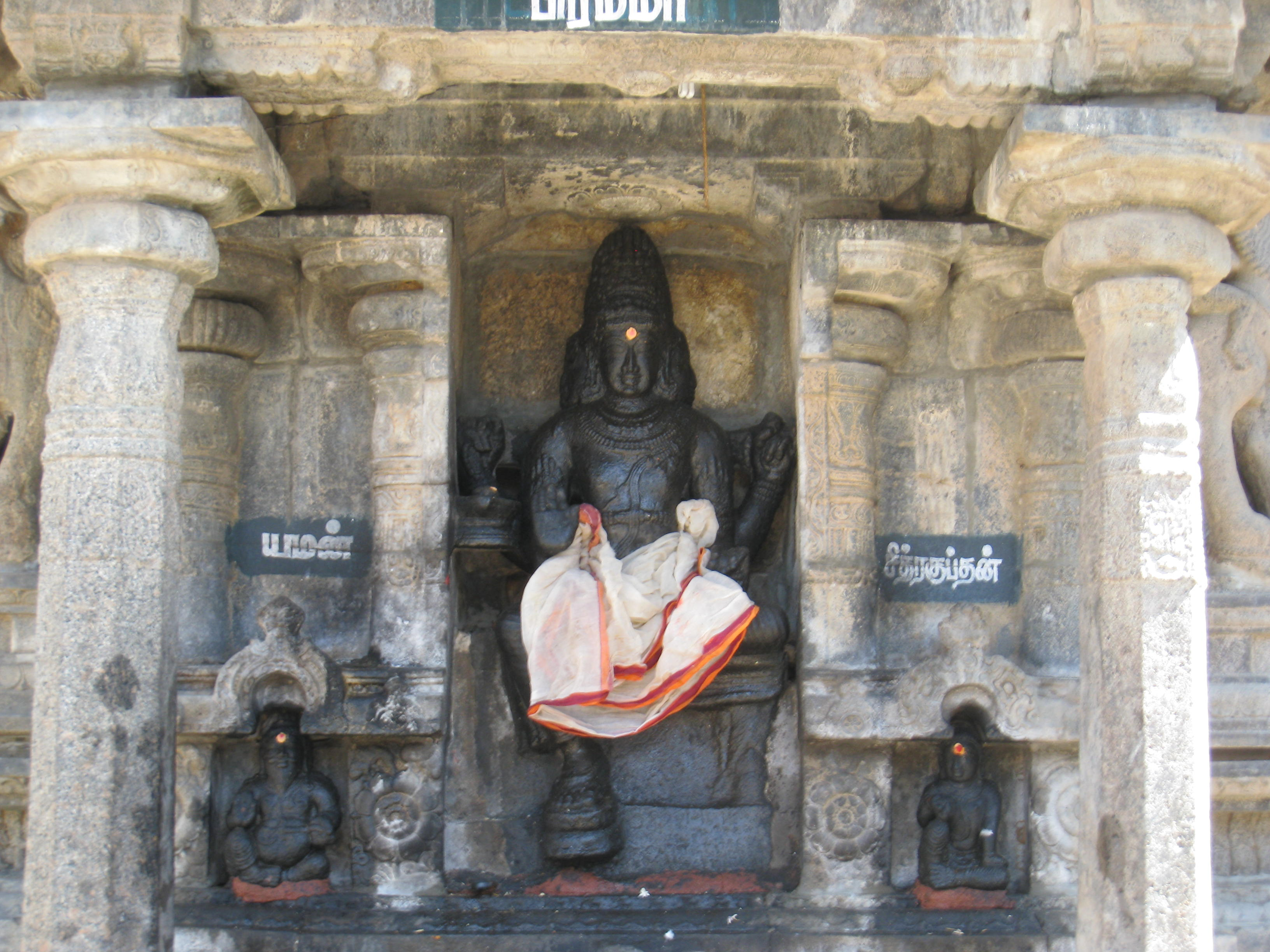
A sculpture of Brahma flanked by Yama and Chitragupta, Tamil Nadu, 10th century CE, Melakadambur Amirtakadeshvarar Temple

In the Bhagavata Purana, Brahma is portrayed several times as the one who rises from the "Ocean of Causes". Brahma, states this Purana, emerges at the moment when time and the universe are born, inside a lotus rooted in the navel of Vishnu, along with Shiva, who emerged inside a fire rooted in the forehead of the god Vishnu. This Purana states that both Brahma and Shiva are drowsy, err, and are temporarily incompetent as they put create the universe. They then become aware of their confusion and drowsiness, meditate as two ascetics, then realize Vishnu in their bodies, see the beginning and end of the universe, and then their creative powers are revived. Brahma and Shiva, states the Bhagavata Purana, thereafter combine Prakriti (nature, matter) and Purusha (spirit, soul) to create a dazzling variety of living creatures, and a tempest of causal nexus. The Bhagavata Purana therefore attributes the creation of Maya to Brahma and Shiva, wherein they create for the sake of creation, imbuing everything with both the good and the evil, the material and the spiritual, a beginning and an end.

The Puranas describe Brahma as the god who creates time. They correlate human time to Brahma's time, such as a mahākalpa being a large cosmic period, correlating to one day and one night in Brahma's existence.

The stories about Brahma in various Puranas are diverse and inconsistent. In the Skanda Purana, for example, the Tridevi are called the "mothers of the universe", and they are credited with creating Brahma, all the other gods including Vishnu, Shiva, the three worlds, and the entire universe. The Skanda Purana states that they are the ones who combined the three Gunas - Sattva, Rajas, Tamas - into matter (Prakrti) to create the empirically observed world.

The Vedic discussion of Brahma as a Rajas-quality god expands in Puranic and Tantric literature. However, these texts state Brahma's wife Sarasvati has Sattva (quality of balance, harmony, goodness, purity, holistic, constructive, creative, positive, peaceful, virtuous), therefore complementing Brahma's Rajas (quality of passion, activity, neither good nor bad and sometimes either, action qua action, individualizing, driven, dynamic) with her Sattva qualities.

=== Sangam literature ===
The Sangam literature mentions all Hindu gods and goddesses as well as Vedic practices in Tamilakam. Tamilians considered the Vedas as the books of Hinduism and used it to perform Yajnas. Several Tamil Hindu kings and queens performed Vedic sacrifices and worshipped various gods and goddesses of Hinduism. Several Sangam texts mention Brahma as a creator god born from the navel of Vishnu along with Shiva as a destroyer god born from his forehead, while Vishnu was the preserver god. As he is a direct biological ancestor of all royal families, the Cholas claimed Brahma and Shiva as their direct biological ancestors, and Vishnu as their creator and the creator of this entire universe. The Cilappatikaram also contains several mentions of Brahma as the creator god.

== Iconography ==
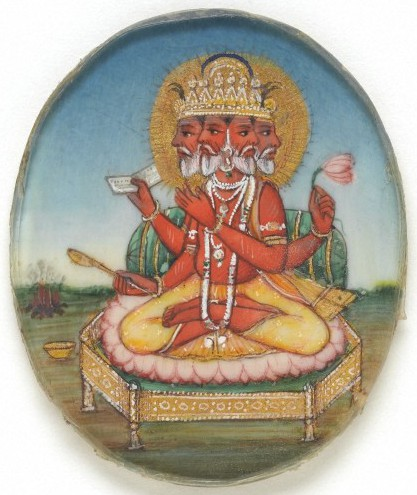
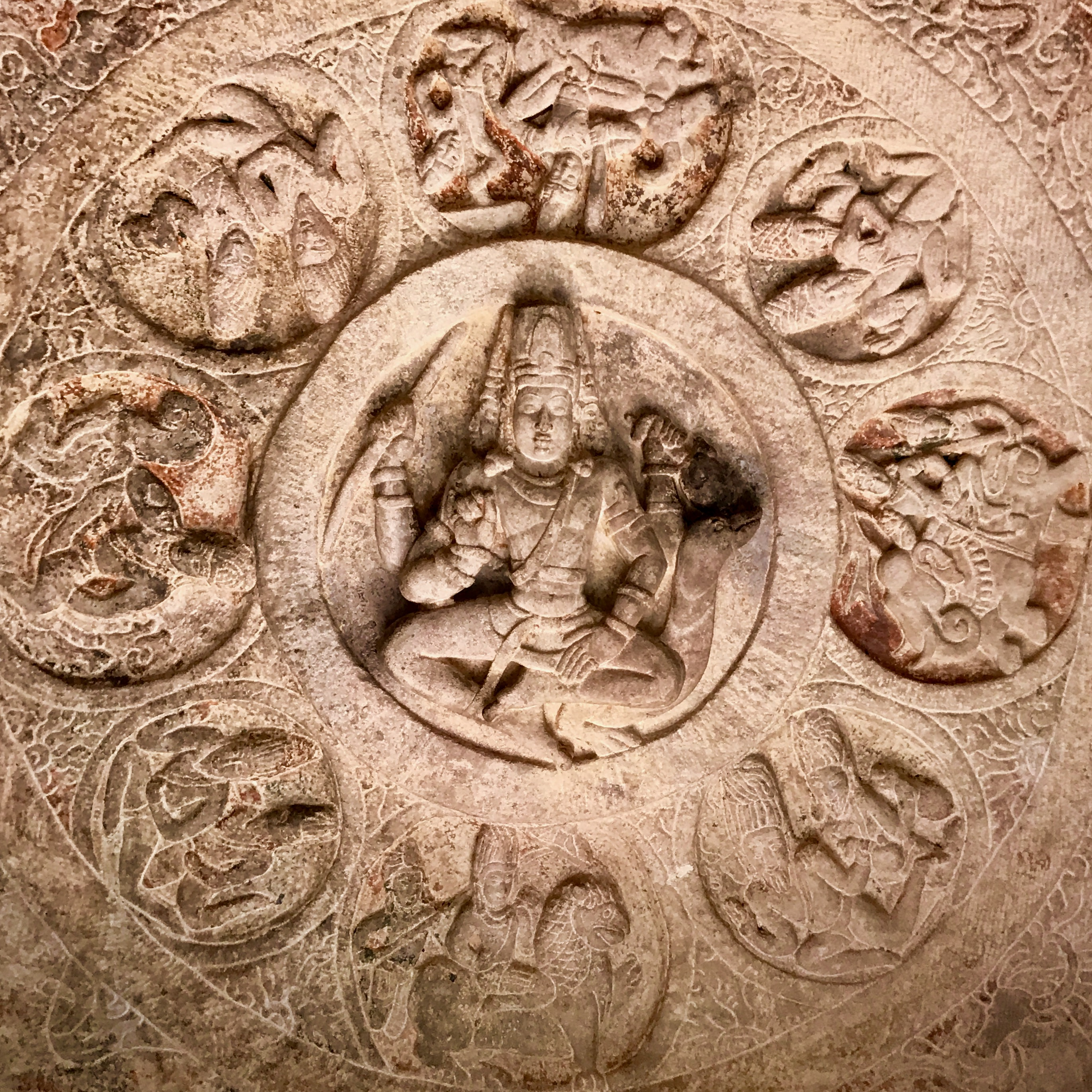
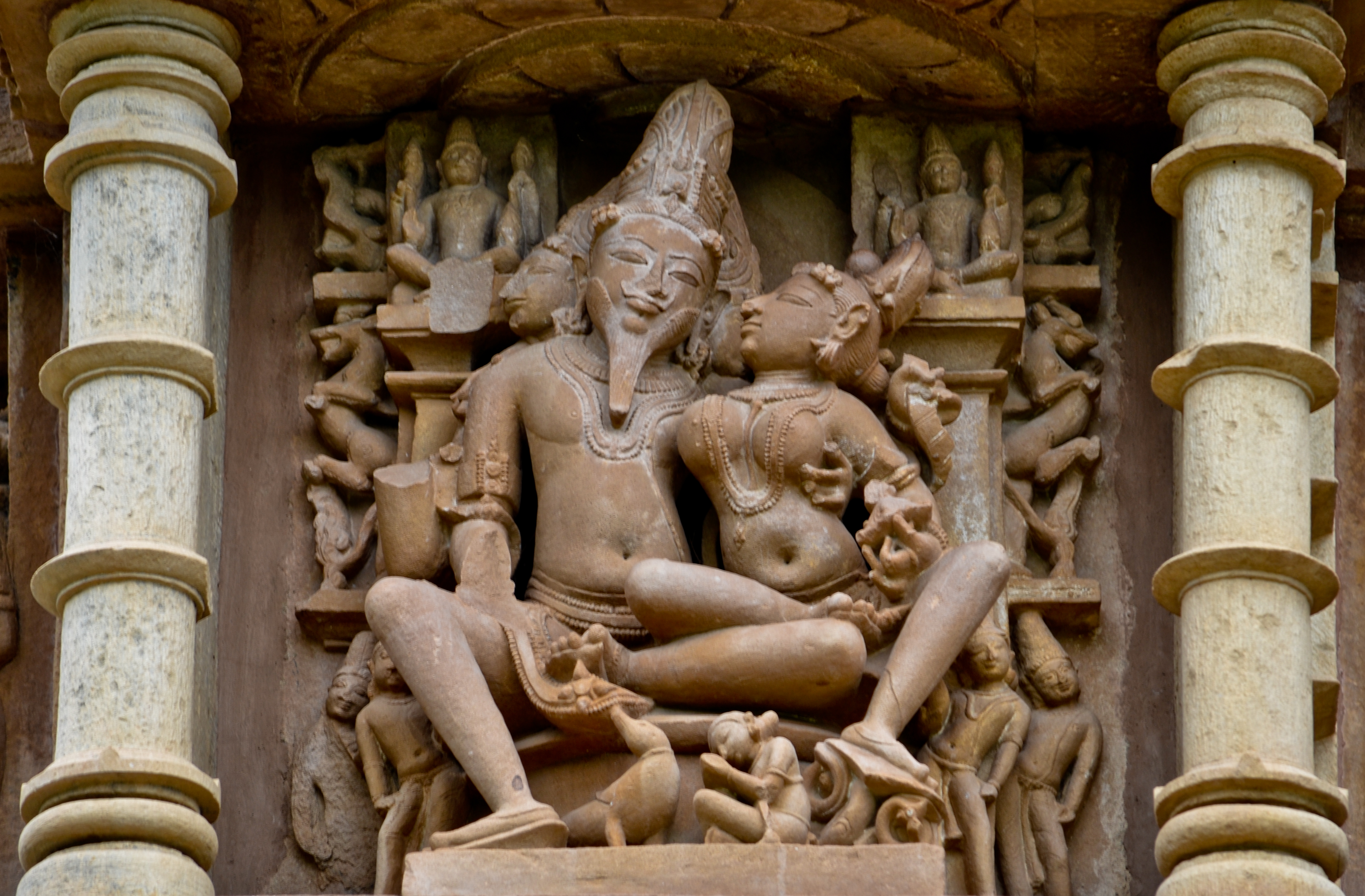
Left: 19th century CE painting of four-headed Brahma as an aged man, holding lotus, manuscript (Vedas) and a ladle; Right: 6th century CE statue of Brahma as a middle-aged man in Badami cave temples holding a stylus, ladle, mala; Beneath of Painting and Badami statue: 10-11th century CE Chandela Era sculptor depicting Brahma and his consort Saraswati, Chitragupta (Surya) Temple, Khajuraho.

Brahma is traditionally hown with four faces and four arms. Each face of his points towards a main direction. His hands hold no weapons, but rather symbols of knowledge and creation. In one hand, he holds the sacred texts of Vedas, in the other hand, he holds a mala, symbolizing the time to create the universe, in the other hand, he holds a shruka, — a ladle symbolizing the means to feed sacrificial fire, and in the even another hand, a kamandalu – a utensil with water symbolizing the means from where all creation emits. His four mouths are credited with creating the four Vedas. He is often depicted with a white beard, implying his sage-like experience. He sits on a lotus, dressed in white (or red and pink), with his vehicle (vahana) – hamsa, a swan – nearby.

Chapter 51 of the Manasara, an ancient design manual in Sanskrit for making murtis and temples, states that a Brahma statue should be gold in color. The text recommends that the statue have four faces and four arms, have jata-mukuta-mandita (matted hair of an ascetic), and wear a diadem (crown). Two of his hands should be in refuge granting and gift giving mudra, while he should be shown with kundika (water pot), akshamala (rosary), a small shruka and a large shruka (two ladles used in yajna ceremonies). The text details the different proportions of the murti, describes the ornaments, and suggests that the idol wear chira (bark strip) as a lower garment, and either be alone or be accompanied with goddess Sarasvati. Brahma is associated largely with the Vedic culture of yajna and knowledge. In some Vedic yajna, Brahma is summoned in the ritual to reside and supervise the ritual in the form of Prajapati.

Brahma's wife is the goddess Sarasvati. She is the embodiment of his power, the instrument of creation and the energy that drives his actions.

== Epochs of Brahma ==
Brahma, despite being believed to be the creator, is considered mortal according to scriptures. The Age of Brahma, according to Hindu cosmology, spans vast epochs of time. A kalpa is a day of Brahmā, and one day of Brahmā consists of a thousand cycles of four yugas, or ages: Satya Yuga, Treta Yuga, Dvapara Yuga and Kali Yuga. These four yugas, rotating a thousand times, comprise one day of Brahmā, and the same number comprise one night. Brahmā lives one hundred of such "years" and then dies. These "hundred years" total 311 trillion 40 billion (311,040,000,000,000) earth years. Brahma's lifespan is 311.04 trillion solar years, and humanity is in the 28th Kali Yuga of the 51st year of the current Brahma's life.

== Worship ==
=== India ===
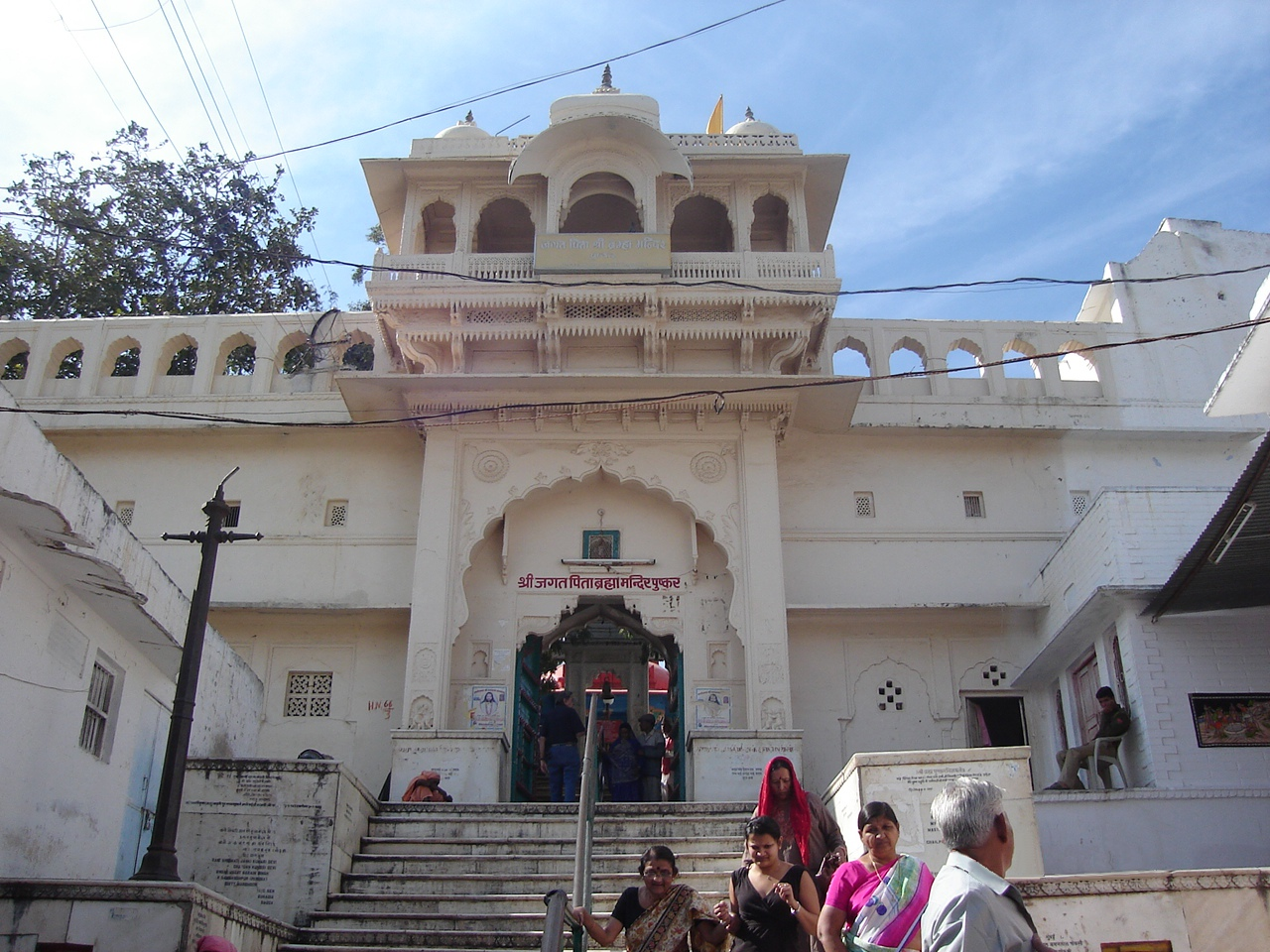
Brahma Temple in Pushkar, Rajasthan

Few temples in India are primarily dedicated to Brahma and his worship. Legends tell that Savitri, Brahma's wife, pronounced a curse restricting his worship to Pushkara. The most prominent Hindu temple for Brahma is the Brahma Temple, Pushkar. Others include:

- Shri Kheteshwar Brahmadham Teerth, Asotra, Barmer, Rajasthan
- Adi Brahma Temple, Khokhan, Kullu, Himachal Pradesh
- Brahma Karmali Temple, Nagargao, Valpoi, Goa
- Brahmaji Temple, Chhinch, Banswara, Rajasthan
- Brahma Temple, Khedbrahma, Sabarkantha, Gujarat
- Brahma Kuti Temple, Bithoor, Kanpur, Uttar Pradesh
- Kumbakonam Brahma Temple, Thanjavur, Tamil Nadu

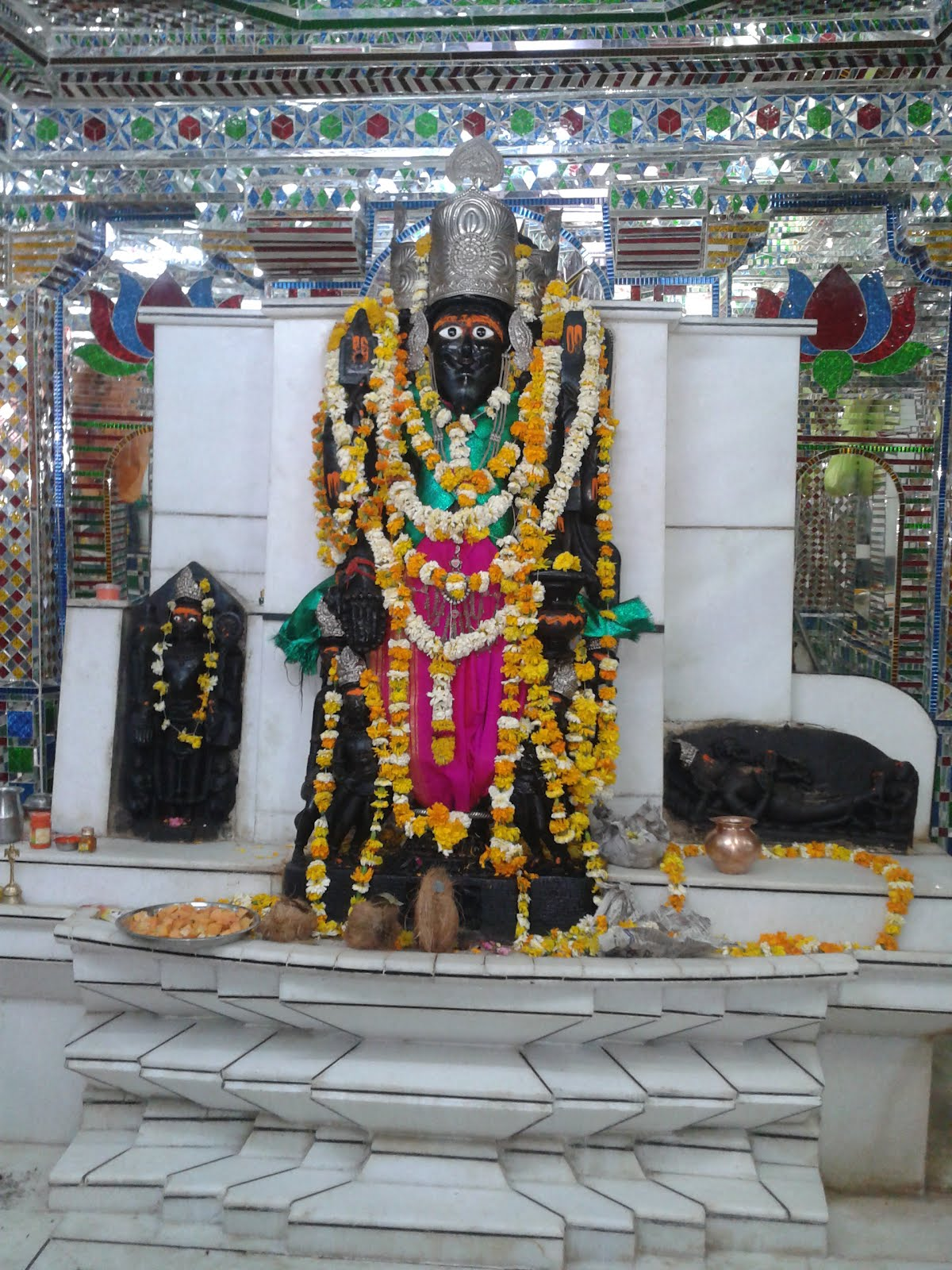
12th century CE statue of Brahma in Chhinch, Banswara, Rajasthan

Brahma is also worshipped in temple complexes dedicated to the Trimurti. Some of these are: Thanumalayan Temple, Sri Purushothaman Temple, Thripaya Trimurti Temple, Mithrananthapuram Trimurti Temple, Kodumudi Magudeswarar Temple, Brahmapureeswarar Temple

In Kerala, there is also a shrine for Brahma in Kandiyoor Mahadeva Temple where according to legend, Lord Shiva beheaded Brahma.

Chaturmukeshvara temple at the temple town of Srikalahasti near Tirupati, Andhra Pradesh has an image of Lord Shiva with four faces and has bas-relief carvings. At this temple, Lord Brahma and Lord Shiva are both worshipped. According to a legend, this is the place where Lord Brahma regained His ability to create after He pleaded forgiveness from Lord Shiva for getting rid of His Sisihathya sins.

There is a Chaturmukha Brahma temple in Chebrolu, Andhra Pradesh, and a seven feet height of Chatrumukha (Four Faces) Brahma temple at Bangalore, Karnataka. In the coastal state of Goa, a shrine belonging to the fifth century, in the small and remote village of Carambolim, Sattari Taluka in the northeast region of the state is found.

A famous icon of Brahma exists at Mangalwedha, 52 km from the Solapur district of Maharashtra and in Sopara near Mumbai. Temples exist in Khokhan, Annamputhur and Hosur.

=== Southeast and East Asia ===
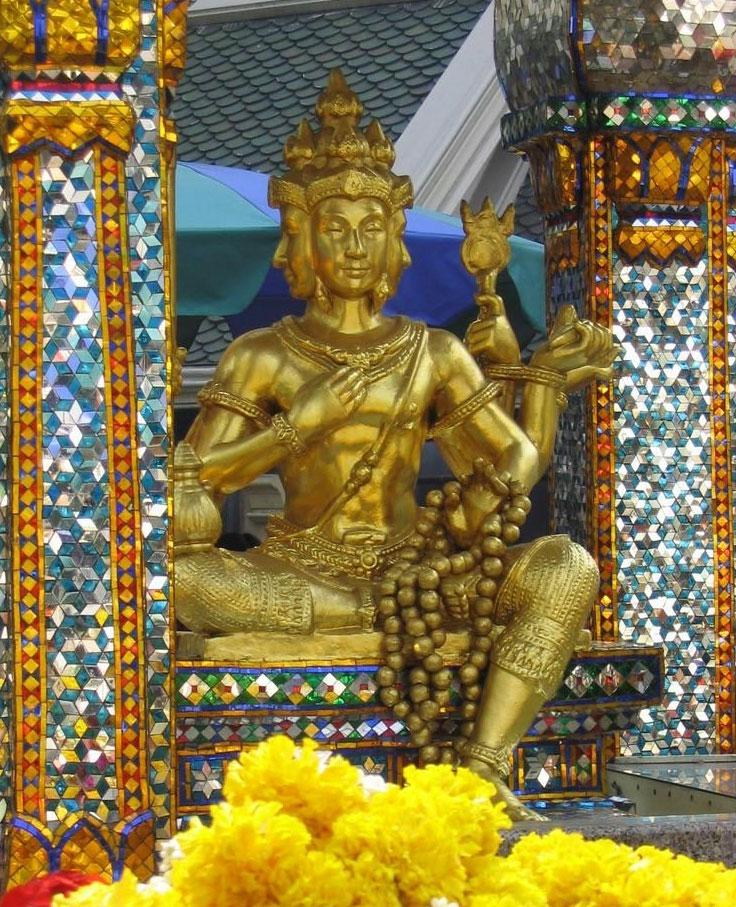
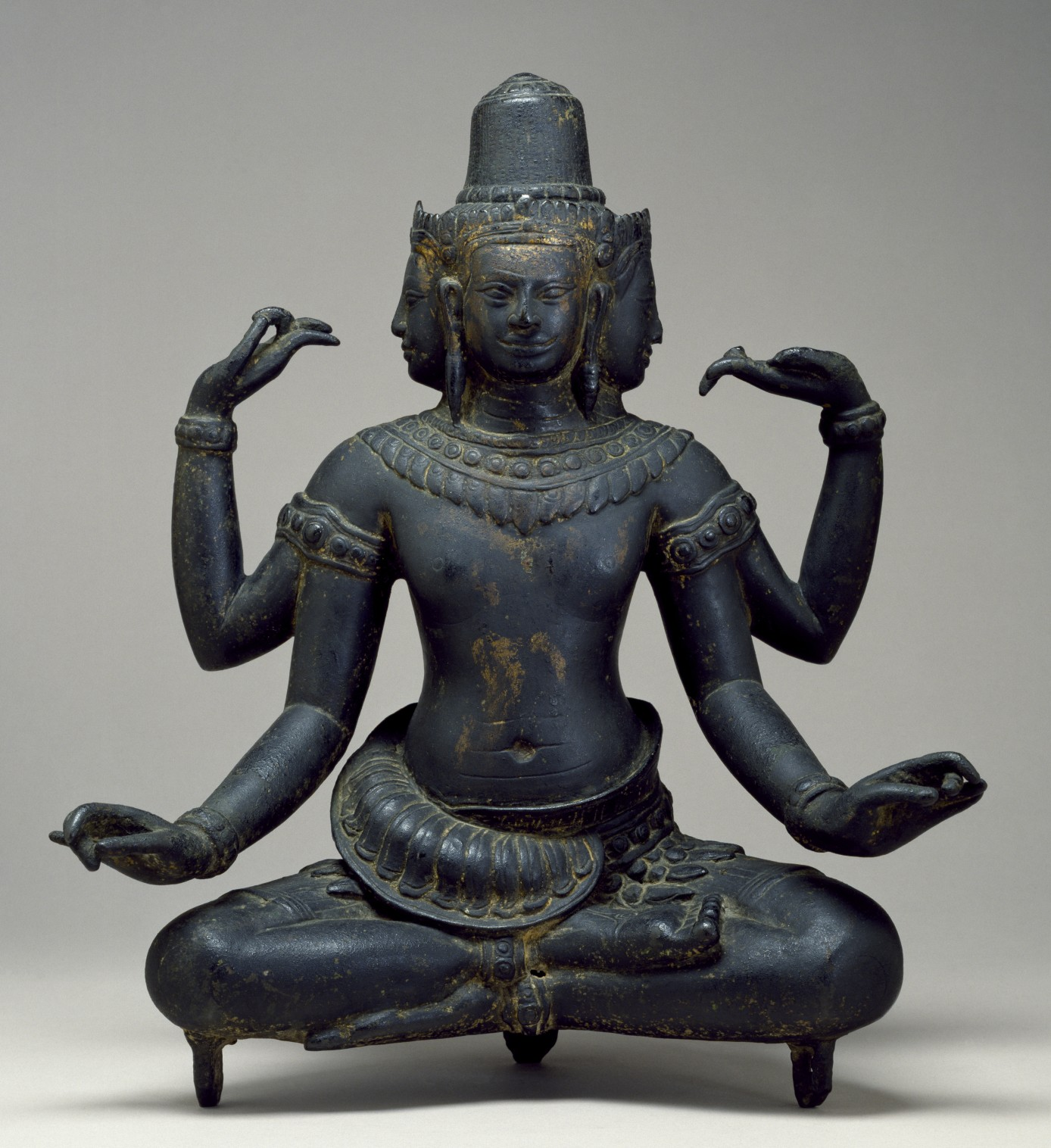
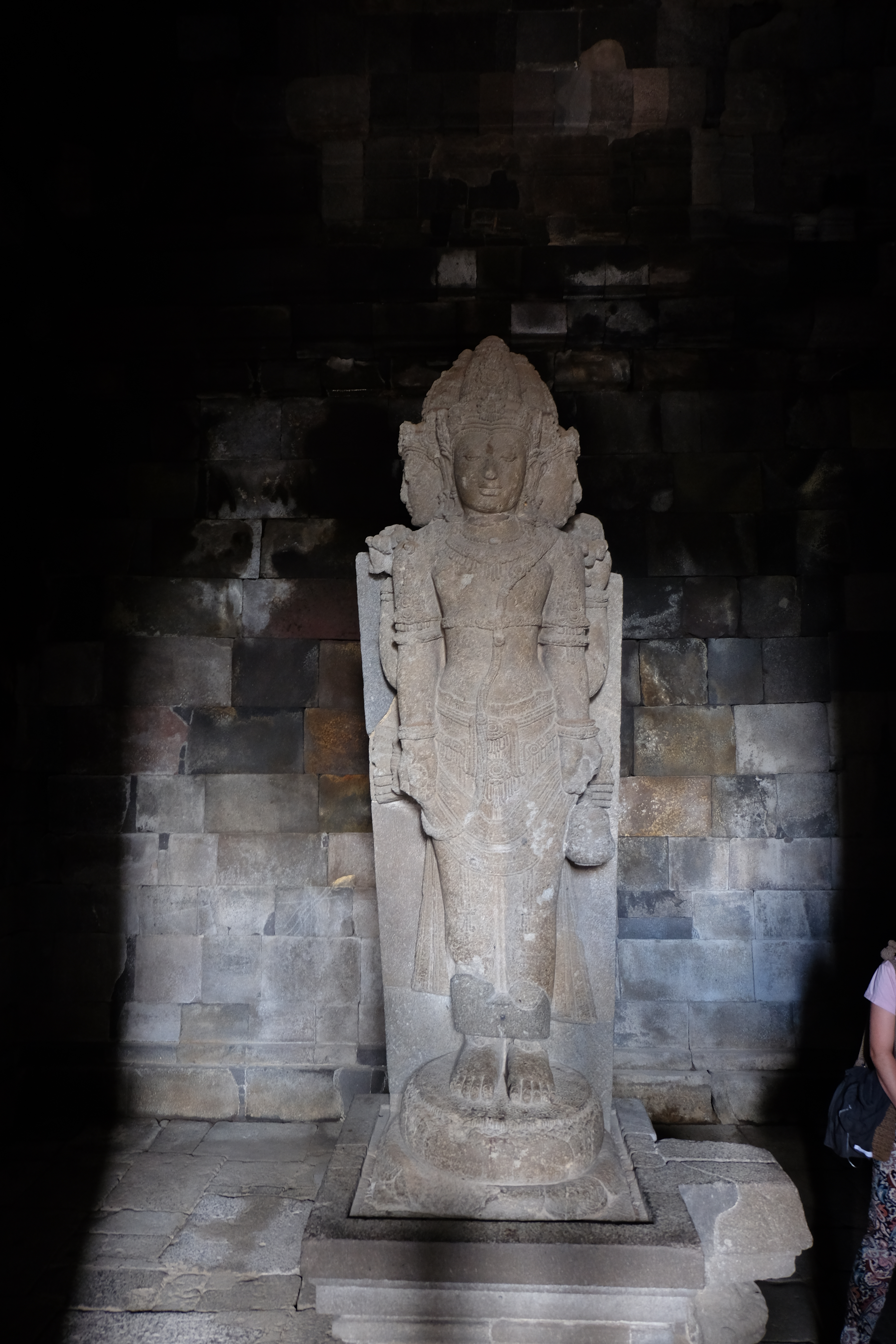
Left: The four-faced Brahma (Phra Phrom) statue, Erawan Shrine, Thailand
Center: 12th-century CE Brahma with missing book and water pot, Cambodia
Right: 9th-century CE Brahma Sculpture in Prambanan Java, Indonesia

A shrine of Brahma can be found in Cambodia's Angkor Wat. One of the three largest temples in the 9th-century CE Prambanan temples complex in Yogyakarta, central Java (Indonesia) is dedicated to Brahma, the other two to Shiva (largest of three) and Vishnu respectively. The temple dedicated to Brahma is on the southern side of Shiva temple and Vishnu temple.

A statue of Brahma is present at the Erawan Shrine in Bangkok, Thailand and continues to be revered in modern times. The golden dome of the Government House of Thailand houses a statue of Phra Phrom (Thai representation of Brahma). An early 18th-century CE painting at Wat Yai Suwannaram in Phetchaburi city of Thailand depicts Brahma.

The name of the country Burma is derived from Brahma. In medieval texts, it is referred to as Brahma-desa.

Brahma in Buddhism is known in Chinese as Simianshen (四面神, "Four-Faced God"), Simianfo (四面佛, "Four-Faced Buddha") or Fantian (梵天), Tshangs pa (ཚངས་པ) in Tibetan, Phạm Thiên (梵天) in Vietnamese, Bonten (梵天) in Japanese, and Beomcheon (범천,梵天) in Korean. In Chinese Buddhism, he is regarded as one of the Twenty Devas (二十諸天 Èrshí Zhūtiān) or the Twenty-Four Devas (二十四諸天 Èrshísì zhūtiān), a group of protective dharmapalas.

Hindus in Indonesia still have a high regard for Brahma (Indonesian and Javanese: Batara Brahma and Sanghyang Brahma). In Prambanan there is a special temple made for Brahma, side by side with Vishnu and Shiva, and in Bali there is Andakasa Temple dedicated to Brahma.

In the past, although not as popular as Vishnu and Shiva, the name Brahma appeared on several occasions. In the legend that developed in East Java about Ken Arok, for example, Brahma is believed to be the biological father of Ken Arok. It is said that Brahma was fascinated by the beauty of Ken Arok's mother, Ken Endok and made her a lover. From this relationship was born Ken Arok.

The name Brahma is also used as the name of a mountain in the Tengger mountain range, Mount Bromo. Mount Bromo is believed to be derived from the word Brahma and there was once a sect that believed that Brahmaloka - the universe where Brahma resides - was connected to Mount Bromo. To this day, Mount Bromo is still considered a sacred place for Javanese Hindus, making it the location for the annual Yadnya Kasada or Kasodo ceremony. People around Mount Bromo will celebrate the Kasodo festival every year by presenting offerings such as vegetables, chickens and money that are revealed to the Gods and poured into the crater of Mount Bromo as a sign of gratitude to the Almighty.

In the Javanese version of wayang (shadow puppet play), Brahma has a very different role from his initial role. When Hindu society began to disappear from Java and the era of Walisongo's wayang kulit began to emerge, Brahma's role as creator in the shadow puppet standard was given to a figure named Sang Hyang Wenang, while Brahma himself was renamed to Brama (fire) where he was a ruling god. Brama, the son of the figure of Batara Guru (Shiva). The figure of Brahma in Javanese wayang is fused and mixed with the figure of Agni.

== See also ==
- Brahma (Buddhism)
- Brahma Samhita
- Brahmastra
- Brahma from Mirpur-Khas
- Brahmakumari
- Brahmani
- Demiurge
- Svetovid
