= Udesh Shrestha =

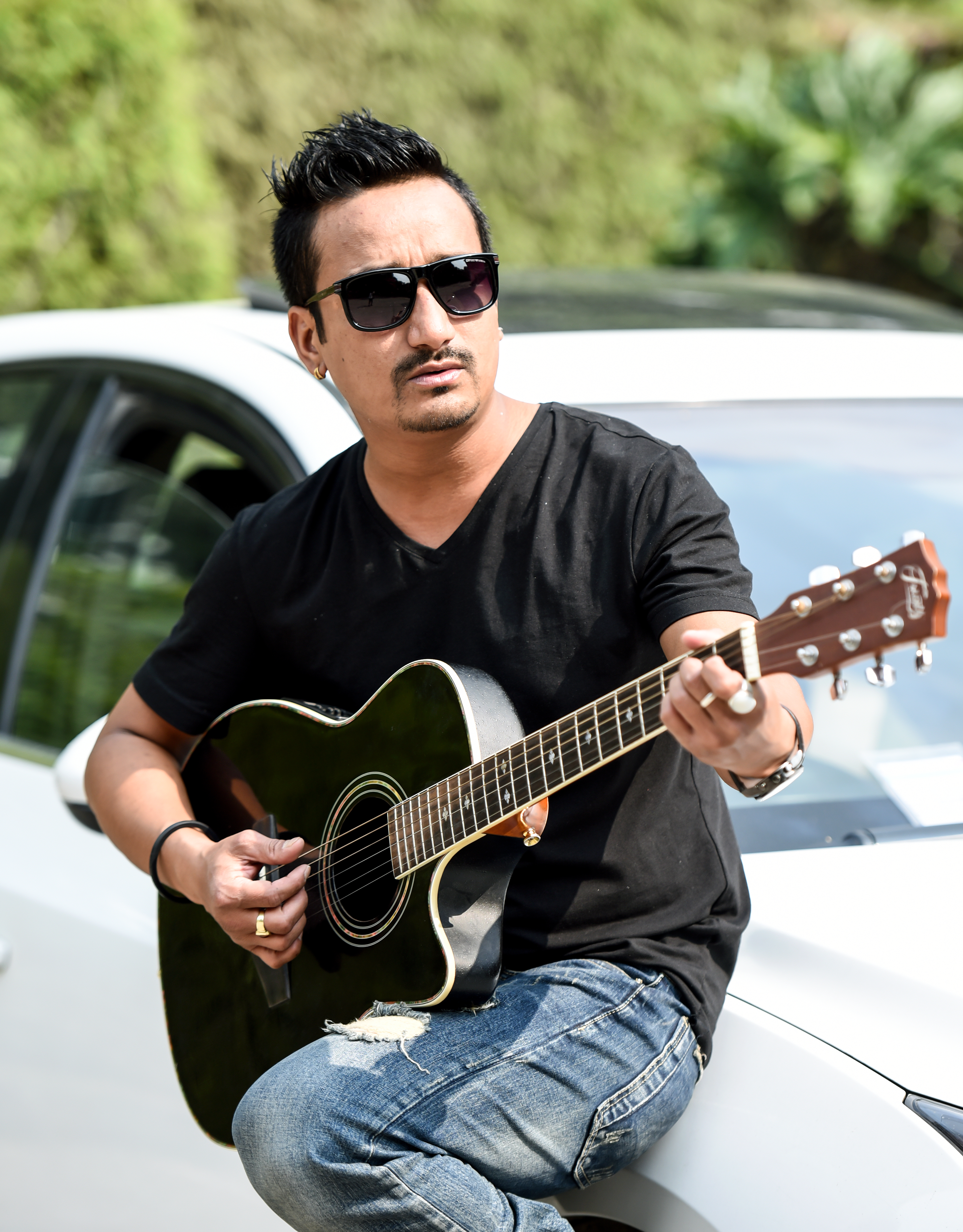
- Udesh Shrestha

Background information
- Born: Udesh Chandra Shrestha; 30 March 1981 (age 44); Dhulikhel, Kavrepalanchok Nepal
- Genres: Pop, Folk rock, Folk Pop
- Occupations: Singer, songwriter, composer, music arranger, background scorer
- Instruments: Vocals, Guitar, Piano
- Years active: 1999 to present
- Labels: SAV, Reeyaz Music, Reewaz Music, Genius Digital. etc.
- Website: udeshshrestha.com.np

Udesh Chandra Shrestha known as Udesh Shrestha ( Nepali : उदेश श्रेष्ठ; born 30 March 1981) is a Nepali pop singer, music composer, songwriter, music arranger & background scorer. Born in Dhulikhel, Kavrepalanchok Nepal, he was the fifth child of Ram Pyari Shrestha and Ram Shrestha.

== Musical career ==
Udesh Shrestha started his musical career in 1999 by recording his first single track Ghorahi Bazar. However, he was not noticed in the music industry until 2005 when he released his debut album titled Lovearea. In 2005, he was nominated in Hits Fm Music Award 2061 for Best Vocal Collaboration Song "Yo Junima" together with Bhugol Dahal for the album Lovearea. He has been nominated for various awards in Hits FM Music Award, Tuborg Image Awards, Music Khabar Music Award, Kalika FM Music Award, etc. He won the 14th Annual Tuborg Image Award for "Best Vocal Performance (Pop)" for the song Aansu Ko Thopa and 17th Annual Tuborg Image Award for "Best Song With National Feelings" for the song Uthau Uthau. He has been nominated in Tuborg Image Awards in six occasions and won a couple of times.

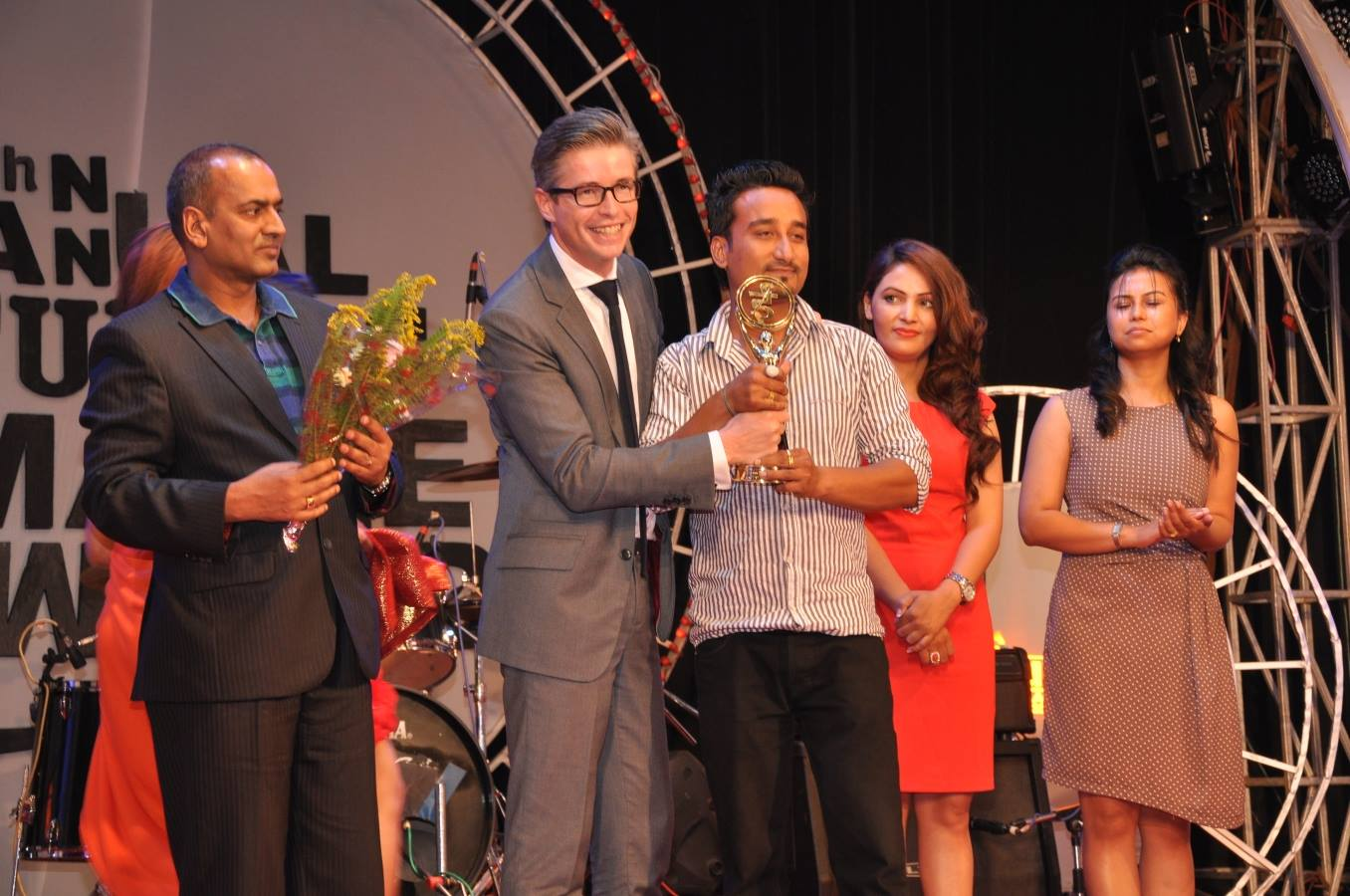
Udesh Shrestha receiving Image Award

He worked on his skill with classical maestros like Professor Sangita Pradhan (Rana) and Dr. Hom Nath Upadhyaya. Currently, he's working on his 5th studio album due this fall. He is also active in some social work. He's been working for Yes Humanity ( A Non-Profit Organization in Sydney ) as the Nepal Ambassador since 2015. He's the celebrity spokesperson for the music streaming mobile app Yonder Music Nepal, powered by Ncell.

== Early life ==
From his early childhood, Udesh Shrestha was passionate about music. He went to Shree Triveni Higher Secondary School. He also attended Lalitkala Music College.

== Album discography ==
- Love Area-2005
- Rahasya-2007
- Still Alive-2012
- Variation-2016

== Songs ==
- Yo Junima
- Kina Mayama
- Bhakkano Phutera
- Haina Bhaneko Chaina
- Sindhuli Gadhi
- K Bhayo Kina Bhayo
- Godhuli Saanjh
- Naatak
- Timrai Lagi
- Yo Aansu
- Thikai Cha
- Swartha
- My Love is True
- Yo Din Yo Raat
- Nasocha
- Sakdina
- Huncha Maya Ma
- Tara Tipera
- Pahad Royeko Chha
- Jogaum Mili
- Desh Nr\irman
- Nasalu Nayaan
- Yo Dashain

== International tours ==
- Hong Kong-2005
- Dubai-2007
- Thailand-2012
- Australia-2015
- SSLSD (QATAR) IN 5F.2022-2023 going to grade 6.
