= Rajpurohit =

Indian caste from western Rajasthan

Rajpurohit is a caste native to western Rajasthan in India.

They maintain traditions that are similar to both Brahmins and Rajputs. According to political analysts, the Rajput, Charan and Rajpurohit communities are considered to be identical with regards to their social customs.

== Etymology ==
The term "rajpurohit" (lit. 'royal priest', from raj (royal) + purohit (priest)) is synonymous with "rajguru" a term used in ancient India for a type of Brahmin. Hermann Kulke and Dietmar Rothermund note that there "is much evidence in ancient texts that there were two ideal types of Brahmins in those days, the royal priest or advisor (rajpurohit, rajguru, "akherajot" and "kanot") and the sage (rishi) who lived in the forest and shared his wisdom only with those who asked for it."

The modern usage of the term in this sense has been described by Sumit Sarkar as a "self-conscious archaism".

== History ==
The Rajpurohits claim to be descendants of purohit Brahmins who were chosen as chief priests by the kings of western Rajasthan in the regions of Marwar and Mewar. Though they form a separate caste and differ in traditions from the Brahmins and do not provide Brahminical services as is traditionally expected of Brahmins. For instance, they have been described as having mediated the matrimonial alliances of Rajputs but did not play any role in the actual wedding rituals for which the services of regular Brahmins were employed.

The Rajpurohits served as royal caretakers of Hindu kingdoms in western Rajasthan during medieval times and attained feudal status during Rathore rule. The kings used to award a few non-taxable villages or lands known as sasan jagirs and doli jagirs on the boundaries of their kingdoms to Rajpurohits. These villages or lands were considered to be free from any ruler and were outside the ambit of any form of tax. They were granted many jagirs, thikanas, and other feudal lands.

Under Rao Maldev, Rajpurohits got the opportunity to get important positions in the feudal system. This was the time when Jats, Charans, and Kayasthas were being established in important positions in the feudal system. Akheraj Rajpurohit was one of the important confidants of Maharaja Jaswant Singh who later also served Prince Ajit Singh.

== Customs ==
They are closer to Rajputs in terms of traditions and way of life but also follow Brahminical customs such as vegetarianism and the wearing of janeu among others.

In Marwar, the Rajput and Rajpurohit castes are said to have a great numbers of folk deities and kshetra devatas.

== Clans ==
There are many clans in the Rajpurohit caste but the most prominent among them are Sevad, Sodha, Rajguru, Manana, Udesh and Jagarwal. Much information about these clans comes from the ledgers of the jagirs and thikanas granted to them and some information from the historical sources of the Marwar kingdom.

== Current status ==
Most of the Rajpurohits are engaged in agriculture and business.

They are predominantly found in the Marwar and Gorwar regions of Rajasthan which include Jodhpur, Jalore, Pali, Nagaur, Barmer, Jaisalmer, Bikaner, Churu and Sirohi districts. Apart from this, the community is spread all over the country. Most Rajpurohits who live in other parts of India can trace back their roots, up to one to two generations, back to some village in Rajasthan.

Rajpurohits are listed by the Indian government as a forward caste and fall in the unreserved category.

The Rajpurohit community had previously been allied primarily with the Bharatiya Janata Party. In 2009, however, the community switched loyalties to the Indian National Congress, due to perceived neglect by the BJP.

== Notable people ==
- Kheteswara, Indian saint
- Gulab Singh Rajpurohit, Indian politician
- Jethu Singh Rajpurohit, Indian politician
- Shankar Singh Rajpurohit, Indian politician
