= Chhinch =

Chhinch Chheench. brahmpuri
- Village
- Nickname: Brahmdham Chhinch
- Location in Rajasthan, India Chhinch (India)
- Coordinates: 23.467°N 74.317°E
- Country: India
- State: Rajasthan
- District: Banswara

Government
  - Body: Gram Panchayat, Chhinch

Population (2001)
  - Total: 5,700

Languages = Wagdi Hindi
  - Official: Hindi
- Time zone: UTC+5:30 (IST)
- PIN: 327603
- Telephone code: 02968
- ISO 3166 code: RJ-IN
- Vehicle registration: RJ-03
- Coastline: 0 kilometres (0 mi)
- Nearest city: Banswara, Udaipur
- Lok Sabha constituency: Banswara
- Civic agency: Gram Panchayat, Chhinch
- Climate: Even (Köppen)
- Avg. summer temperature: 40 °C (104 °F)
- Avg. winter temperature: 11 °C (52 °F)
- Location in Rajasthan, India

Chhinch is a village in Banswara District, Rajasthan, India. The village is home to a temple to Lord Brahma, dating from the 12th Century. The main occupation of the people is agriculture including the production of wheat, maize, and soybeans.

== Brahmaji Mandir Chhinch ==
Brahmaji Mandir Chhinch
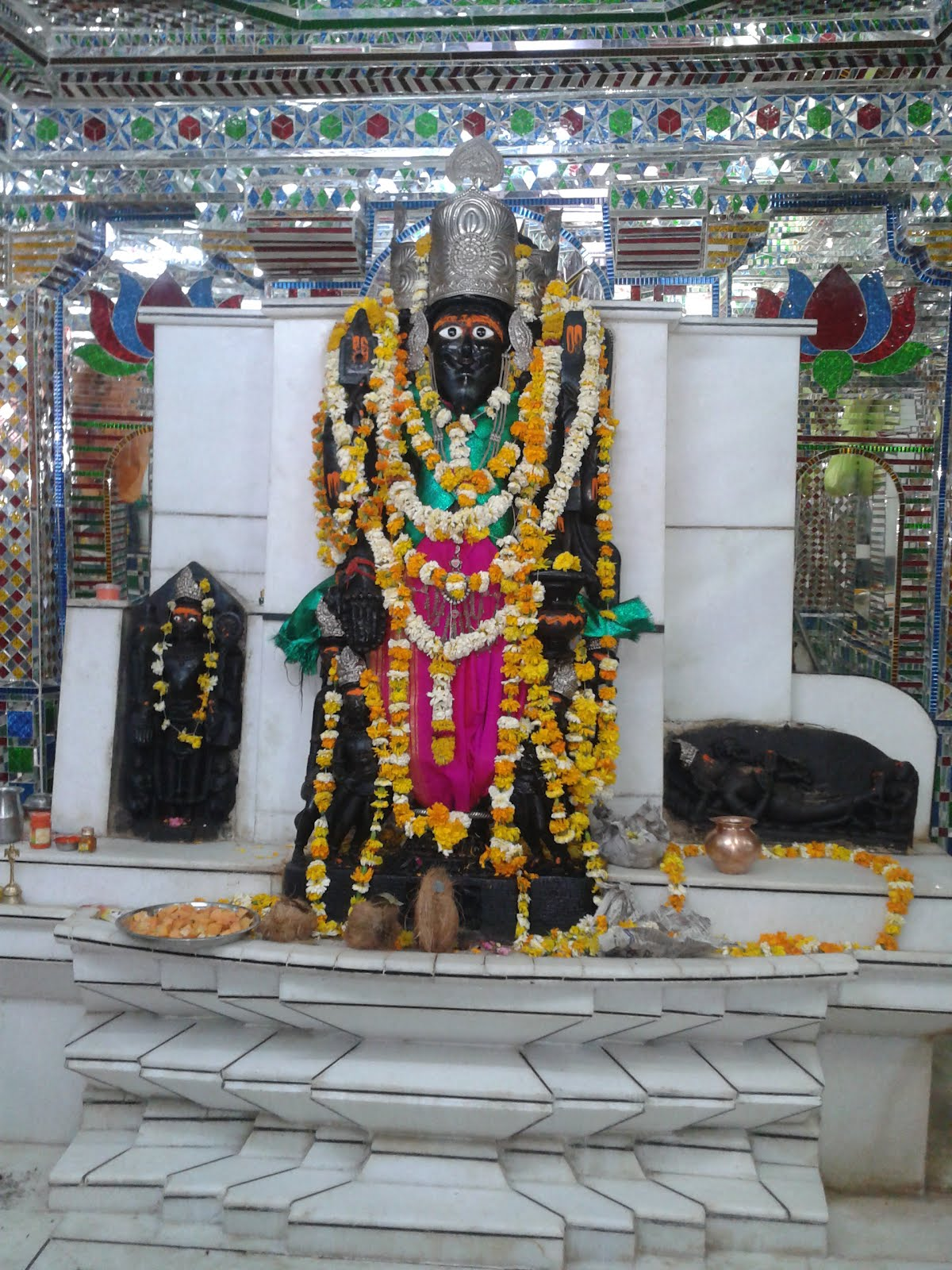

Religion
- Affiliation: Hinduism
- District: Banswara

Location
- Location: Chhinch
- State: Rajasthan
- Country: India

== Place to see ==
- Brahmaji Temple, Chhinch (12th century Temple)
- Shirsha Mata (Amba mata)Temple
- Mankameshvar mahadev Temple
- Guru Aashram
- Vahrai mata Temple
- Laxminarayan Temple
- Govardhan Nath Temple
- Ramji Temple
- Radhakrashan Temple
- Mahalaxmi Temple
- Ganesh ji Temple
- Aamaliya Lake
- Bramah Sarovar
- Jwalamukhi mata Temple
- Rin mukteshvar Mahadev Temple
- Ananpurana Mata Temple
- Bhuneshvar Mahadev
- Ranchodray Temple
- Hasthinapur Dham (Lok devta)

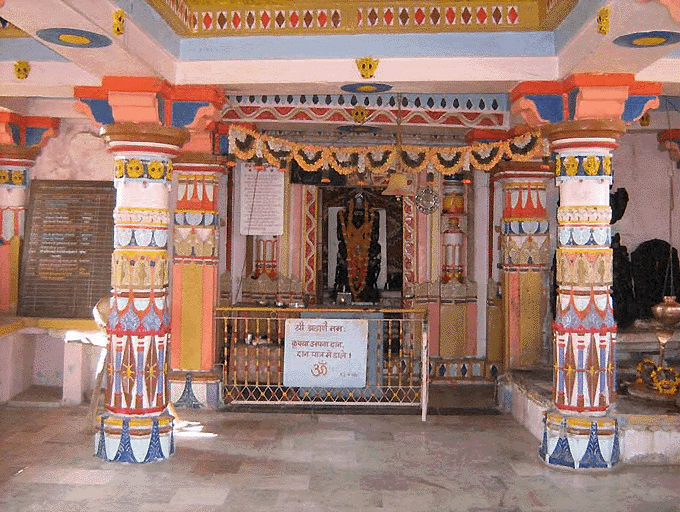

== Demographics ==
Chhinch is a large village located in Bagidora of Banswara district, Rajasthan containing 1138 families. The population as of the 2011 census was 5,662 (2936 males, 2726 females).

In Chhinch village population of children with age 0-6 is 771 which makes up 13.62% of total population of village. Average Sex Ratio of Chhinch village is 928 which is equal than Rajasthan state average of 928. Child Sex Ratio for the Chheench as per census is 853, lower than Rajasthan average of 888.

Chhinch village has higher literacy rate compared to Rajasthan. In 2011, literacy rate of Chhinch village was 76.18% compared to 66.11% of Rajasthan. In Chheench Male literacy stands at 89.64% while female literacy rate was 61.87%.
