= List of leaders of the opposition in the Rajasthan Legislative Assembly =

Leader of Opposition of the Indian state of Rajasthan

Leader of the Opposition of Rajasthan Legislative Assembly
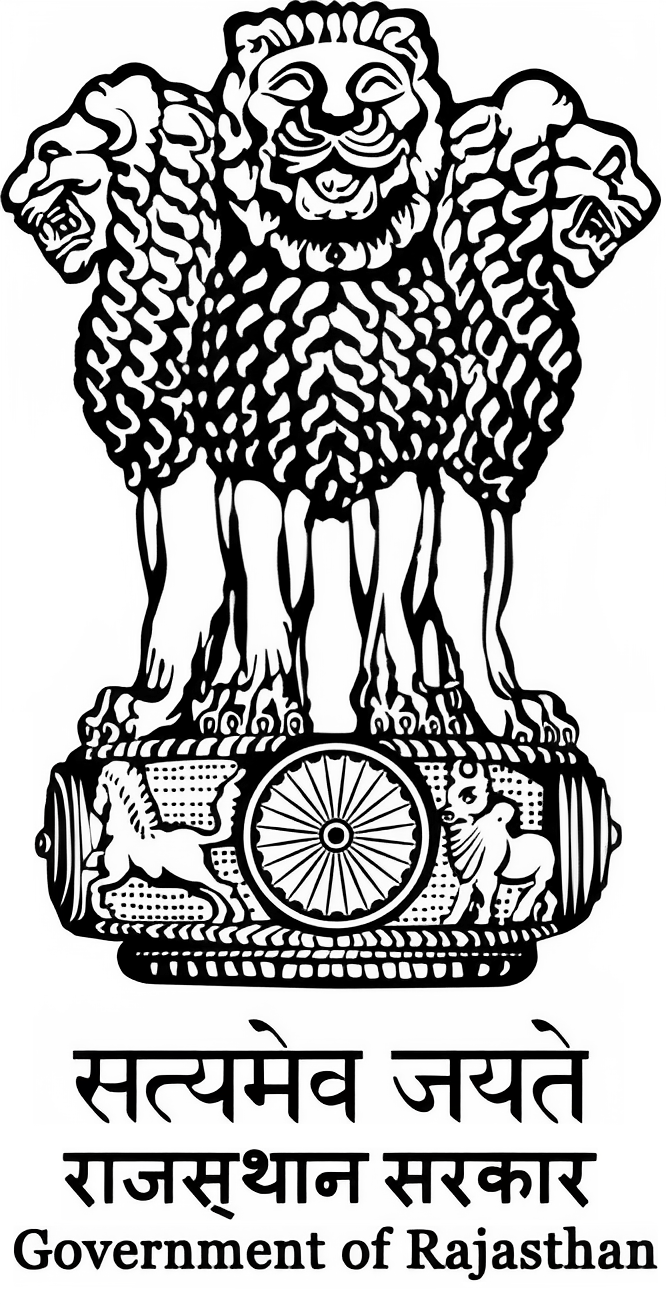
- Emblem of Rajasthan

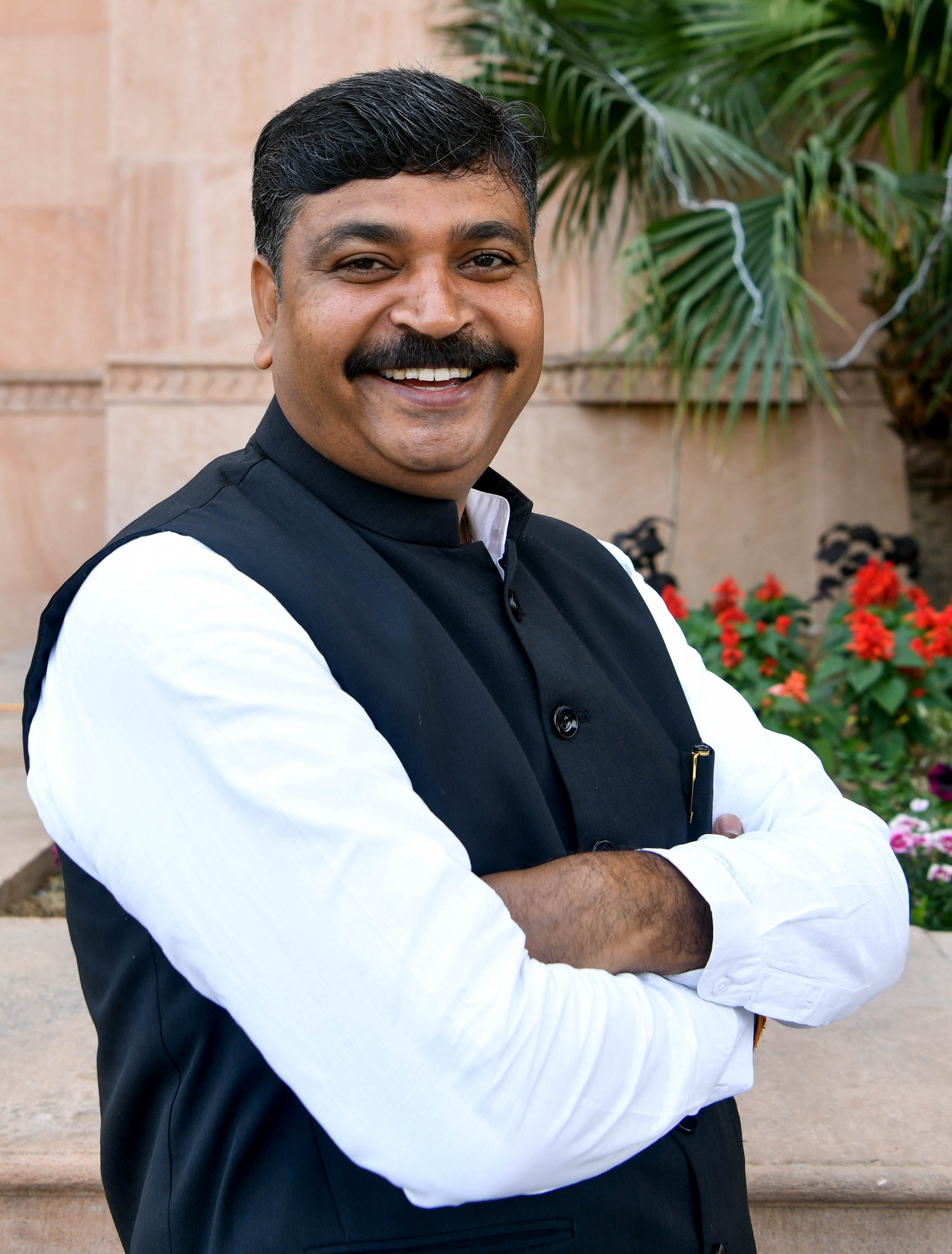
- Incumbent; Tika Ram Jully since 19 January 2024
- Rajasthan Legislative Assembly
- Style: The Honourable
- Status: Leader of Opposition
- Member of: Rajasthan Legislative Assembly
- Nominator: Members of the Official Opposition in the Rajasthan Legislative Assembly
- Appointer: Speaker of Rajasthan Legislative Assembly
- Term length: During the life of the Rajasthan Legislative Assembly (5 years)
- Deputy: Ramkesh Meena, INC (29 July 2024-Incumbent)

The leader of the opposition of the Rajasthan Legislative Assembly is the politician who leads the official opposition in the Rajasthan Legislative Assembly, in the Indian state of Rajasthan. The position is currently held by Tika Ram Jully.

== Leaders of opposition ==
#	Portrait	Name	Constituency	Term			Assembly	Party
1		Jaswant Singh	Bikaner Tehsil	29 March 1952	9 April 1956	4 years, 11 days	1st	Independent
2		Tan Singh	Barmer	3 December 1956	31 March 1957	118 days	1st	Ram Rajya Parishad
3		Narendra Singh	Dudu	24 April 1957	1 March 1962	4 years, 311 days	2nd	Ram Rajya Parishad
4		Laxman Singh	Aspur	13 March 1962	28 February 1967	4 years, 352 days	3rd	Swatantra Party
4		Laxman Singh	Dungarpur	3 May 1967	15 March 1972	4 years, 317 days	4th	Swatantra Party
4		Laxman Singh	Dungarpur	20 March 1972	30 April 1977	5 years, 41 days	5th	Swatantra Party
5		Parasram Maderna	Bhopalgarh	18 July 1977	13 November 1978	1 year, 118 days	6th	Indian National Congress
6		Ram Narayan Choudhary	Mandawa	13 November 1978	15 February 1979	94 days	6th	Indian National Congress
(5)		Parasram Maderna	Bhopalgarh	16 February 1979	29 August 1979	194 days	6th	Indian National Congress
(4)		Laxman Singh	Chittorgarh	24 September 1979	11 October 1979	17 days	6th	Indian National Congress
7		Bhairon Singh Shekhawat	Chhabra	15 July 1980	9 March 1985	4 years, 237 days	7th	Bharatiya Janata Party
7		Bhairon Singh Shekhawat	Amber	28 March 1985	1 March 1990	4 years, 338 days	8th	Bharatiya Janata Party
8		Hari Dev Joshi	Banswara	19 March 1990	15 December 1992	2 years, 271 days	9th	Indian National Congress
(5)		Parasram Maderna	Bhopalgarh	31 December 1993	30 November 1998	4 years, 334 days	10th	Indian National Congress
(7)		Bhairon Singh Shekhawat	Bali	8 January 1999	18 August 2002	3 years, 222 days	11th	Bharatiya Janata Party
9		Gulab Chand Kataria	Badi Sadri	24 August 2002	4 December 2003	1 year, 102 days	11th	Bharatiya Janata Party
10		Bulaki Das Kalla	Bikaner	16 January 2004	26 January 2006	2 years, 10 days	12th	Indian National Congress
(6)		Ram Narayan Choudhary	Mandawa	27 January 2006	22 October 2007	1 year, 268 days	12th	Indian National Congress
11		Hemaram Choudhary	Gudha Malani	23 October 2007	10 December 2008	1 year, 49 days	12th	Indian National Congress
12		Vasundhara Raje	Jhalrapatan	2 January 2009	20 February 2013	4 years, 49 days	13th	Bharatiya Janata Party
(9)		Gulab Chand Kataria	Udaipur	21 February 2013	9 December 2013	291 days	13th	Bharatiya Janata Party
13		Rameshwar Lal Dudi	Nokha	23 January 2014	12 December 2018	4 years, 323 days	14th	Indian National Congress
(9)		Gulab Chand Kataria	Udaipur	17 January 2019	16 February 2023	4 years, 30 days	15th	Bharatiya Janata Party
13		Rajendra Singh Rathore	Churu	2 April 2023	3 December 2023	245 days	15th	Bharatiya Janata Party
14		Tika Ram Jully	Alwar Rural	19 January 2024	Incumbent	2 years, 231 days	16th	Indian National Congress
