= Tirath Das Dogra =

Indian forensic pathologist

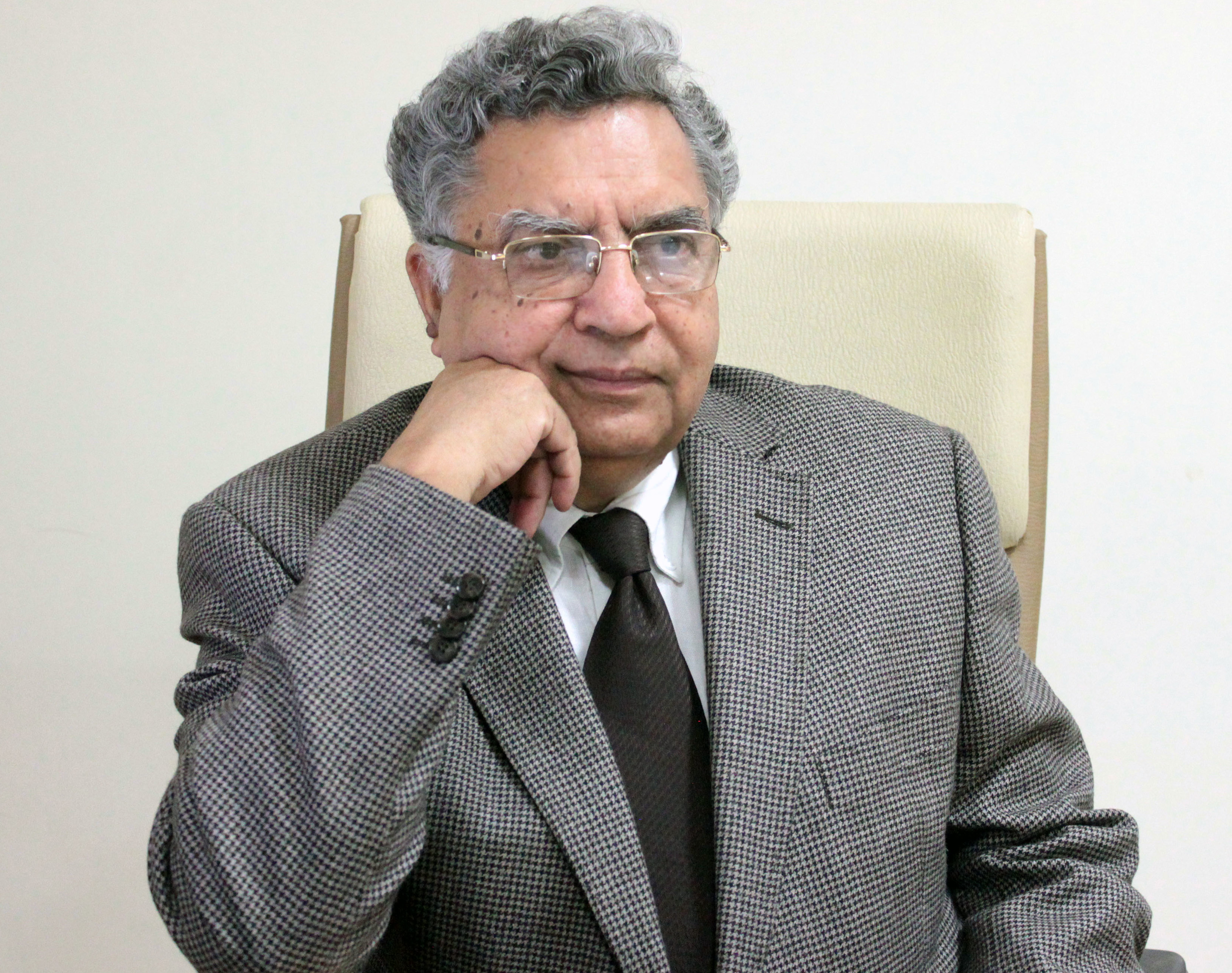
- Born: 18 July 1947 (age 79); Bari Brahmana, Jammu and Kashmir, British India
- Education: Sardar Patel Medical College, Bikaner (MBBS); All India Institute of Medical Sciences, Delhi (MD)
- Employer(s): SGT University, Budhera, Gurgaon
- Known for: Medical jurisprudence, forensic pathology, forensic medicine, toxicology

Tirath Das Dogra (IAST: Tīrath Dās Ḍōgarā, born 18 July 1947) is an Indian forensic pathologist. He was the pro-chancellor and vice-chancellor of Shree Guru Gobind Singh Tricentenary University,Haryana (2013–2017).

== Early life ==
He was born to Prem Nath Dogra and Gayano Devi Dogra at Bari Brahmana, near Jammu, Jammu & Kashmir, British India, 20 kilometres from Jammu on the Basantar River (the present border with Pakistan). After the Partition of India in 1947 his father moved to Bikaner in 1959; he settled there permanently in 1961. Dogra completed Badridas Vidavatji ka Middle School Sikar and SSC in 1963 and attended M M High School Bikaner (1959 to 1963). After a year at Dungar College Bikaner, he received a degree in medicine from Sardar Patel Medical College.

== Career ==
Dogra received the first MD degree in forensic medicine from AIIMS in 1976. His areas of interest have been DNA profiling, population genetics, residual, environmental and pesticide toxicity, bioethics, pharmacovigilance, continuing medical education, suicide prevention and notes, forensic psychiatry (psychological profiling) crime-scene reconstruction. and Computational criminology He has been involved in medico-legal investigations of high-profile cases throughout India.

Dogra has presented his medico-legal opinion in cases concerning to three prime ministers: Indira Gandhi, Charan Singh and Rajiv Gandhi. He deposed as a medical witness in the Mahesh Chandra Trial Court for Assassination of Indira Gandhi for the prosecution. Although the defence (Pran Nath Lekhi, R. S. Sodhi and Ram Jethmalani) challenged Dogra's testimony, the evidence was upheld by the Supreme Court of India. In the Batla House encounter case, he used animation to present his expert opinion. Dogra went to Sri Lanka as part of a three-member Government of India team to assist the investigation of the assassination of Gamini Dissanayake, a presidential candidate. He worked with Seyed E. Hasnain, Sher Ali of NII and Anupum Raina on DNA profiling, with Sanjeev Lalwani and Chitranjan Behera assisting him with forensics. After his retirement from AIIMS, Dogra became Director general of the SGT Group of Institutions and vice-chancellor when it became a university on 15 March 2013.

Dogra is a former director of the All India Institute of Medical Sciences (AIIMS) New Delhi and an authority on forensic medicine. Dogra was a member of the Medical Council of India from December 2013 till its dissolution in September 2018. Dogra was President of National Medicos Organisation Delhi State from 2012 to 2017. He was a member of the TEQ-Equivalence committee and the Administration and Grievance committee of the Medical Council of India. He was a member of the Advisory committee on MOOC's program of University Grants Commission of India New Delhi. Dogra was emeritus professor of forensic medicine and forensic sciences, professor of Andragogy and educational philosophy and advisor, Internal Quality Assurance Cell (IQAC) at SGT University Gurgaon till January 2022. Prof. T D Dogra is a member of the Rehabilitation Council of India.

Dogra held a number of positions during his tenure at AIIMS, including dean (exam), deputy director (administration), chair of the management board of AIIMS Hospitals, hostel superintendent and professor. He joined AIIMS as a resident in 1971, becoming a faculty member in 1977. Following the retirement of Jagdish Chandra on 30 June 1987, Dogra headed the department of forensic medicine and toxicology at AIIMS until his retirement on 31 July 2012.

== Notable cases ==
Dogra's forensic investigations include:

Case	Location	Year
Gitanjali death case	Gurgaon, Haryana	2013
2006 Noida serial murders	Noida, Uttar Pradesh	2007
Ishrat Jahan encounter killing	Ahmedabad, Gujarat	2004
Death of Sohrabuddin Sheikh	Gujarat	2005
Killing of Tulsiram Prajapati	Gujarat	2005
2002 Gujarat violence, Bilkis Bano case	Godhra, Gujarat	2002
Batla House encounter case	Delhi	2008
Uttar Pradesh NRHM scam	Lucknow, Uttar Pradesh	2011
Nigamananda Saraswati of Rishikesh	Rishikesh, Uttarakhand	2011
Ashutosh Asthana of Provident Fund Scam	Ghaziabad, Uttar Pradesh	2009
Kavita Chaudhry case	Meerut, Uttar Pradesh	2007
Kunal Singh (Tamil actor) suicide	Mumbai, Maharashtra	2008
Nirupama Pathak death case	Kodarma, Jharkhand	2010
Ansal Plaza encounter	New Delhi	2002
Shehla Masood case of Bhopal	Bhopal, Madhya Pradesh	2012
2009 Shopian rape and murder hoax	Srinagar, Jammu and Kashmir	2009
Sadiq Batcha case	Chennai, Tamil Nadu	2011
Bhanwari Devi murder case (2011)	Rajasthan	2012
Bhanwari Devi case (1992)	Jaipur, Rajasthan	1992
Harsh Baljee murder	Shimla, Himachal Pradesh	1999
Cherukuri Rajkumar (alias Azad)	Adilabad, Andhra Pradesh	2010
Pipli gang-rape case	Pipli, Odisha	2012
Natasha Singh case reconstruction	New Delhi	2002
Dara Singh encounter	Jaipur, Rajasthan	2002
Ishmeet Singh (singer) death in Maldives	Maldives	2008
Murder of Nitish Katara	New Delhi	2002
R. K. Gupta murder	Delhi	2003
Prathyusha death case	Hyderabad,	2002
Consultation with CBI prosecutors in Priyadarshini Mattoo case	Delhi	1996
Consultation with CBI prosecutors in Ahmedabad Haren Pandya murder	Ahmedabad	2003
2008 Noida double murder case	Noida	2008
Sidhartha Continental Hotel fire	New Delhi	1986
1996 Lajpat Nagar blast	New Delhi	1996
Uphaar Cinema fire	New Delhi	1997
1996 Charkhi Dadri mid-air collision	Charkhi Dadri, Haryana	1996
2005 Delhi bombings	New Delhi	2005
Jnaneswari Express train derailment	West Bengal	2012
Alleged Bhandara rape-murder	Bhandara, Maharashtra	2012
Shruti Bhagvat case	Auragabad, Maharashtra	2013
M. G. Rusia death case	Agra, Uttar Pradesh	2009

His medico-legal cases include:

Case	Location	Year
Assassination of Indira Gandhi	New Delhi	1984
Beant Singh autopsy the assassin of Indira Gandhi.	New Delhi	1984
Suicide of Kishan Chand	New Delhi	1977
Assassination of Jatherdar Stonkh Singh (confident of Indira Gandhi and Jarnail Singh Bhindranwale	Delhi	1981
Assassination of Mr. and Mrs. Lalit Maken (daughter and son-in-law of Shankar Dayal Sharma)	New Delhi	1985
Jagdev Singh Khuddian suicide	Khudian	1990
Murder of Naina Sahni	New Delhi	1995
Shilpi Jain and Gautam Singh death case	Patna, Bihar	1999
Madhavrao Scindia air crash	Mainpuri, Uttar Pradesh	2001
Murder of Satyendra Dubey	Gaya, Bihar	2003
Death of Shri Shanmugam	Tamil Nadu	1991
Assassination of Arjun Das	New Delhi	1985
1995 kidnapping of western tourists in Kashmir	Jammu Kashmir	1995
Khairlanji massacre	Bhandara, Maharashtra	2006
Death of Bibek Maitra	New Delhi	2006
Rahul Mahajan drug-overdose case	New Delhi	2006
Bibi Jagir Kaur murder	Patiala, Punjab	2006
Murder of Amir Singh	Maham, Haryana	1990
Dalip Singh murder case	Jaipur, Rajasthan	1970
Kiliroor sex scandal	Kochi, Kerala	2006
Pratul Deb Murder	Guwahati Assam	2005

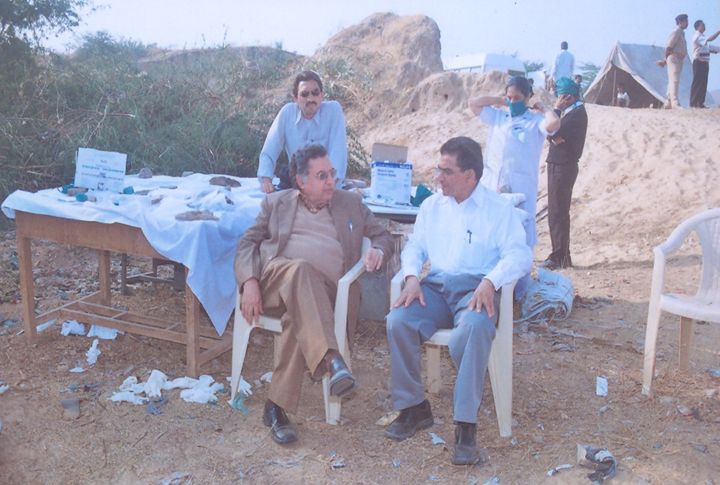
Dogra in rural Gujarat

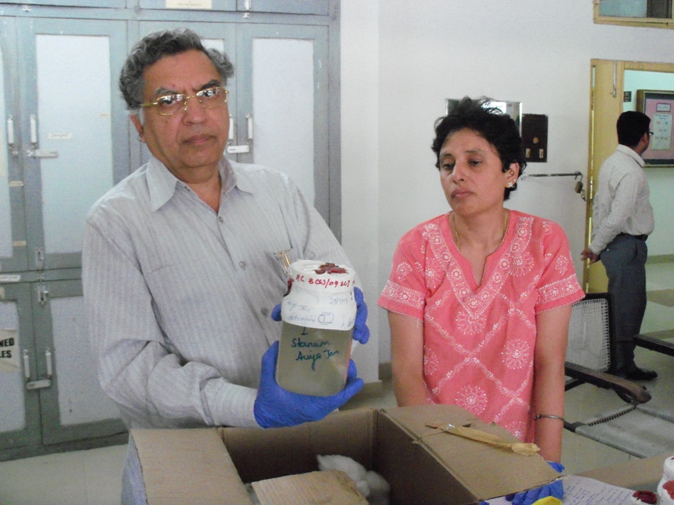
Dogra with Anupuma Raina, senior scientist at FSL Madhuban, Karnal

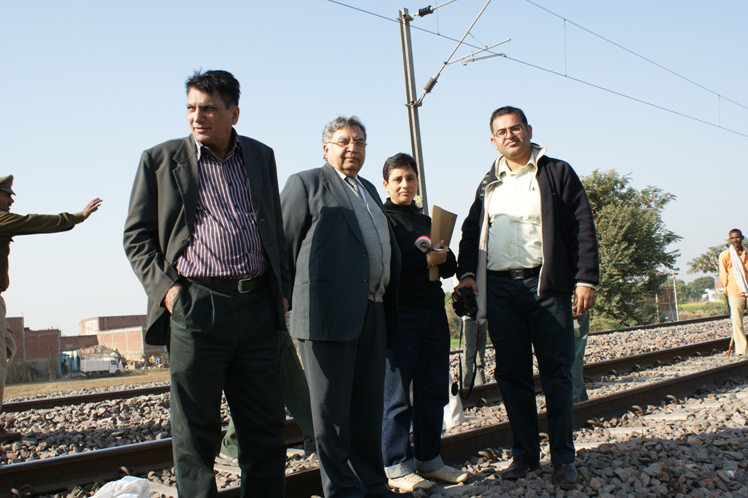
Dogra with team at accident scene near Agra: Rajinder Singh, Sanjeev and Anupum Raina

== Awards ==
The Society of Toxicology (India) gave Dogra a Distinguished Scientist Lifetime Achievement Award in Toxicology, and he received a Distinguished Service Award from the Geriatric Society of India. He delivered the Professor G. Mehdi Oration at the 27th annual national conference of the Indian Academy of Forensic Medicine at North Bengal Medical College and Hospital in Siliguri, West Bengal on 17 February 2006. Dogra delivered the Professor Jagdish Chandra Oration Award at the 12th national conference of the Indian Congress of Forensic Medicine and Toxicology on 27 September 2013 at the Government Medical College, Haldwani, Uttarakhand. Indian Congress of Forensic Medicine and Toxicology gave "Life time achievement award" to Prof Dogra on 13 September 2014.

== AIIMS ==
During Dogra's tenure as director AIIMS acquired 330 acres (130 ha) of land in the Jajhar District of Haryana, and the recommendations of the Moily Committee were implemented. One hundred sixty faculty and 1200 other staff positions were created, a new academic building (came as Convergence Block) was planned and the CDER and JPNA Apex Trauma Center were made fully functional. An agreement with Metro was signed for a tunnel connecting AIIMS and the trauma centre. A surgical centre, maternity centre, dormitories, outpatient department and a urology centre were planned. A new developmental plan integrated with the earlier prepared Master plan was prepared and architectural process was started for its implementation. The long pending clearance from Ministry of civil aviation and urban development for construction of multistory buildings was obtained to facilitate future development of AIIMS in regard to hospital, academics, research, residential and hostels. Manmohan Singh underwent coronary-bypass Surgery at AIIMS, and Pratibha Patil underwent cataract surgery on both eyes. Dogra managed AIIMS during the most troubled times in its history; he is active in organ donation, retrieval and tracking, framing and revising rules and implementing training programs at the AIIMS Organ Retrieval Banking Organization. After succeeding Jagdish Chandra, Dogra developed DNA-profiling and toxicology laboratories. He expanded the department to ten faculty members, two scientists, twelve junior and twelve senior residents.

== DNA laboratory ==
Dogra started DNA facility at department of forensic medicine AIIMS, Delhi, in February 1991 with recruiting of Anupuma Raina as PhD student and G. Bomjen as MD student both taking DNA profiling related thesis topics, Dogra as Chief Guide and Seyed E. Hasnain of NII New Delhi as co-guide. First criminal case solved by DNA from Delhi was in 1992. The integrity and hard work of its in-charge Dr Anupuma raina gave this laboratory reliability and popularity with investigating agencies.

== Medical Toxicology Laboratory ==
Dr Dogra developed Medical Toxicological laboratory in the department of forensic medicine and toxicology in 1987. It was the first laboratory in a medical college where it was aimed to carry out analysis of samples for clinical and forensic purposes. The analytical toxicologist late H C Srivastava worked hard to get a reputation that the honourable courts ordered the tests to be conducted in this laboratory. The laboratory was well equipped with TLC, HPTLC, HPLC, GLC, Voltammetry, Atomic Absorption spectrometry etc. It worked in close collaboration with CFSL, CBI Delhi, FSL Rohini Delhi and JPN NICFS Rohini Delhi,

== Crime scene reconstruction ==
Dogra was engaged in crime scene reconstruction in a variety of cases throughout the length and breadth of the country. He reconstructed the cases pertaining to fall from a height, railway accident, traffic accidents, firearm injuries, bomb blast, asphyxial deaths etc. He examined about 2000 scene of crimes in different states of India.

== Dogra's test ==
He evolved a simple technique to identify old suspected bullet hit marks by lifting the impression using a moldable putty which neither damaged nor made it unfit for further examination of suspected firearm bullet hit marks. More than 2-year-old marks were detected by Professor Dogra at many scenes of occurrences; that is why people started calling it as a Dogra's test.

== Forensic animation ==
During the last decade of his career, he started using animation to explain his finding or observations. He tried it in Batla House encounter case, Heren Pandya case, he also attempted in Ishrat Jahan encounter killing but he could not make it in 3D animation as desired.

== Forensic Psychiatry and Psychology ==
Dogra in 1990 while forensic investigations of the death of Jathedar Jagdev Singh Khudian MP of Akali Dal (Mann), first time in collaboration with Psychiatrist and Clinical Psychologist analysed the Psychological status of deceased by getting filled a proforma developed for this purpose from his friends and family. Subsequently, he applied it in many cases, including the psychological profiling of the accused persons of 2006 Noida serial murders.

== Mass grave exhumation and Forensic anthropometry and anatomy ==
Dogra carried out numbers of exhumations in various states of India. He exhumed mass graves in Gujrat following 2002 communal riots and recovered large numbers of skeletal remains, the anthropometric & anatomical examination and DNA profiling established Identity of many of missing individuals. He always encouraged a collaborative approach in such situation. Dogra used Anthropometric and anatomical examination in variety of cases from different part of country including Bhanwari Devi murder case and 2006 Noida serial murders.

== Publications and research ==
Dogra edited Lyon’s Medical Jurisprudence for India, co-authored Practical Aspects of Forensic Medicine and Toxicology and has published more than 200 papers in national and international journals. He has guided more than 50 MD and PhD thesis projects, and supervised or co-supervised research funded by BPR&D, DST, ICAR and WHO. Dogra has been an editorial member or peer reviewer of a number of national and international journals, and has written for the popular press. He is the founder of the Journal of Forensic Medicine and Toxicology and Indian Internet Journal of Forensic Medicine and Toxicology. Dogra founded the Indian Congress of Forensic Medicine and Toxicology, He organised numerous conferences, workshops and seminars, and has delivered guest lectures, inaugural and valedictory talks on a variety of topics.

== Committees, consultation and visiting positions ==
Dogra has been a member of a number of committees constituted by the Government of India, State Governments and AIIMS: the Advisory Committee on Prison Reform (BPR&D); the member (Medical Toxicology)Central Insecticide Board (Ministry of Health and Family Welfare); the member (Medical Toxicology) Registration Committee for Insecticides (Ministry of Agriculture); RAP and SAC (Research Analysis Panel and Scientific Advisory Committee) of the Centre for DNA Fingerprinting and Diagnostics (CDFD) and the Subcommittee on Medicolegal Services in Delhi. He has consulted with the Central Bureau of Investigation, courts, state Crime Branch CIDs, the National Commission for Human Rights, the National Commission for Women and the National Commission for Protection of Child Rights. Dogra has been a visiting faculty member at the LNJP National Institute of Criminalistics and Forensic Sciences, the Police Training School, the Judicial Academy (Delhi), the Karkardooma Court (Shahdara), the Judicial Academy (Nanital, Uttrakhand), the Sardar Patel Academy of Police, the Lal Bahadur Shastri National Academy of Administration (LBSNAA) in Mussoorie, U.P., the Academy of Administration and Management (Nanital), CBI Academy (Ghaziabad), the National Academy of Customs Excise and Narcotics (NACEN), HIPA, Haryana Institute of Public Administration and the Institute of Road Traffic Education (IRTE) in Faridabad.

Dogra established and developed the department of forensic medicine at B.P. Koirala Institute of Health Sciences in Dharan, Nepal, a joint venture of the governments of India and Nepal. He has interacted with internationally known forensics experts such as Keith Simpson, Keith Mant, T. K. Marshal, D. J. Ghee, Alec Jeffreys, Michael S Pollanen, Stephen M. Cordner, Henry Lee (forensic scientist) and Derrick J. Pounder.

== 2008 Noida double murder case ==
Professor Dogra led the first forensic team along with Arun Kumar Joint director, than Supercop of CBI, team consisted of Rajender Singh director CFSL, other relevant experts from CFSL, CBI, Delhi and from AIIMS including 25 sleuths of CBI. Team started work on 1 June 2008 with examination of scene of crime. Team functioned till the Arun Kumar was called back to his cadre the UP Police from CBI.

== Ishrat Jahan encounter killing ==
Amzad Ali Rana of Pakistan, Javed Gulam Sheikh born Pranesh Pillai, Zeeshan Johar and Ishrat Jahan Raza were killed in a police encounter on 15 June 2004. The Gujrat high court constituted SIT (special investigating team) to investigate the encounter. The chairman of SIT constituted a team of experts with Professor T D Dogra as its chairman, experts from CFSL (central forensic laboratory New Delhi) and AIIMS New Delhi were included. Two chairmen of the SIT were changed by the time board of experts submitted their report to R R Verma, then chairman of SIT. It was revealed in 2016 that the report submitted by the team of experts was not taken into considerations by the SIT while concluding their report. It attracted the attention of media and issue was politicised. Some of the files concerning to an affidavit by the then Government of India, in this case were found missing. An inquiry into this matter has been issued by Govt of India.

== Bilkis Bano case ==
After police dismissed the case against her assailants, Bilkis Bano approached the National Human Rights Commission of India and petitioned the Supreme Court seeking a reinvestigation. The Supreme Court granted the motion, directing the Central Bureau of Investigation (CBI) to take over the investigation. CBI appointed a team of experts from the Central Forensic Science Laboratory (CFSL) Delhi and All India Institute of Medical Sciences (AIIMS) under the guidance and leadership of Professor T. D. Dogra of AIIMS to exhume the mass graves to established the identity and cause of death of victims. The team successfully located and exhumed the remains of victims. The trial of the case was transferred out of Gujarat and directing the central government to appoint the public prosecutor. Charges were filed in a Mumbai court against nineteen people as well as six police officials and a government doctor over their role in the initial investigations. In January 2008, eleven men were sentenced to life imprisonment for the rape and murders and a policeman was convicted of falsifying evidence.

== Batla House encounter case ==
The case was referred to Tirath Das Dogra of AIIMS New Delhi for expert opinion, subsequently he appeared in court of law as an expert witness, he had explained the event through animation. On 25 Jul 2013, the Saket sessions court in its judgement convicted one of the suspects, Shahzad Ahmad, for murder of police inspector Mohan Chand Sharma and attempted murder of Head Constables Balwant Singh and Rajbir Singh. The court also found Ahmad guilty of obstructing and assaulting public servants, and grievously injuring the police officers to deter them from performing their duty.

== 2009 Shopian rape and murder hoax ==
Near to Shopian a town about 40 km away from Srinagar, Kashmir two women were found dead on the banks of Rambiara Nala, the autopsies were conducted by a team of doctors of Kashmir including one lady doctor. The cause of death was given as head injury. The vaginal swabs were preserved which were positive for spermatozoa at FSL Srinagar. There was agitation led by Majlis Musharraf in Kashmir. The police officers were arrested. The matter was taken by Kashmir High court Suo moto. CBI was entrusted with investigations who engaged Professor T D Dogra as chairman of the team of experts, which included experts from CFSL(central forensic laboratory New Delhi) and AIIMS New Delhi. After exhumation and exhaustive examination, Board of experts concluded that cause of death was drowning and it was a case of deception because vaginal swabs did not belong to the deceased ladies, these were of the source other than the two deceased ladies, it was concluded by DNA Profiling.

== Assassination of Indira Gandhi ==
Indira Gandhi was brought at 9:30 am to the All India Institute of Medical Sciences, where doctors operated on her. She was declared dead at 2:20 pm. The post-mortem examination was conducted by a team of doctors headed by Dr. T.D. Dogra. Dr. Dogra stated that as many as 30 bullet wounds were sustained by Indira Gandhi, from two sources, a Sten gun and a pistol. The assailants had fired 31 bullets at her, of which 30 had hit; 23 had passed through her body while 7 were trapped inside her. Dr. Dogra extracted bullets to establish the identity of the weapons and to match each weapon with the bullets recovered by ballistic examination. The bullets were matched with respective weapons at CFSL Delhi. Subsequently, Dr. Dogra appeared in the court of Shri Mahesh Chandra as an expert witness (PW-5), and his testimony lasted several sessions. The cross examination was conducted by Shri P. N. Lekhi, the defence counsel. Salma Sultan gave the first news of assassination of Indira Gandhi on Doordarshan's evening news on 31 October 1984, more than 10 hours after she was shot. She died two weeks and five days before her 67th birthday.

== Shanmugam's death during investigations of assassination of Rajiv Gandhi ==
Shanmugam, one of the prime suspects, allegedly committed suicide in custody of SIT. This drew the attention of media and public. On 30 July 1991, it was raised as a starred question number *t13 in Parliament, by Ram Naik MP, while replying then Home Minister Shankarrao Chavan said in proceedings "..by Dr.T.D. Dogra, Additional Professor and Head of the Department of Forensic Medicines and Dr.D.N. Bhardwaj, Senior Resident Doctor in the Department of Forensic Medicines, All Indian Institute of Medical Sciences, New Delhi. I will read the report for the information of the House so that if the Hon. Members have any doubts... (Interruptions)".

== CBI Reconstruct Tulsi Prajapati encounter case ==
The CBI and a team of forensic science experts reconstructed the alleged fake encounter of Tulsi Prajapati by Gujarat police in 2006 at Chhapri village in the district on Friday. The team headed by Rajendra Singh of the Central Forensic Science Laboratory (CFSL), and T D Dogra of Forensic Medicine Department at All India Institute of Medical Sciences (AIIMS), began the reconstruction early morning. The forensic experts and CBI were assisted by state CID officials. CID was investigating the case before Supreme Court transferred it to the central agency. The experts obtained crucial data such as the distance between the police vehicle and the car in which Prajapati was travelling, location of Prajapati's body after the encounter as per the CID's FIR, how police officers fired at Prajapati and the distance from which they fired.

== Personal life ==
Dogra married Lalita Dogra (née-Sharma) (03-12-1950 – 24-January 2019) from Palampur, Himachal Pradesh, in 1975. They have two children (Ankit and Aakanksha) and three grandchildren (Shaunak, Vanya and Arnayaa).

== See also ==
- AIIMS New Delhi
