= Pukhraj Garg =

Indian politician

Member of Rajasthan Legislative Assembly
- In office 2018–2023
- Preceded by: Kamsa Meghwal
- Succeeded by: Geeta Barwar
- Constituency: Bhopalgarh

Personal details
- Born: Bhopalgarh Jodhpur
- Party: Bharatiya Janata Party (Since 2024)
- Other political affiliations: Rashtriya Loktantrik Party (till 2024)
- Education: B. Tech
- Occupation: Politician

Pukhraj Garg is Indian politician from Rajasthan. He is a member of Bharatiya Janata Party. He was a member of the Rajasthan Legislative Assembly representing the Bhopalgarh constituency in Rajasthan.

He left Rashtriya Loktantrik Party and joined Bharatiya Janata Party on 16 March 2024.
