= Parasram Maderna =

Indian politician (1926–2014)

Speaker of the Rajasthan Legislative Assembly
- In office 6 January 1999 - 15 January 2004
- Chief Minister: Ashok Gehlot
- Preceded by: Samrath Lal Meena
- Succeeded by: Sumitra Singh
- Constituency: Bhopalgarh

Member of the Rajasthan Legislative Assembly
- In office 1998–2003
- Preceded by: Ramnarayan Dudi
- Succeeded by: Mahipal Maderna
- Constituency: Bhopalgarh
- In office 1993–1998
- Preceded by: Madan Kaur
- Succeeded by: Hema Ram
- Constituency: Gudamalani
- In office 1990–1993
- Preceded by: Narayan Ram Bera
- Succeeded by: Ramnarayan Dudi
- Constituency: Bhopalgarh
- In office 1967–1985
- Preceded by: Constituency Established
- Succeeded by: Narayan Ram Bera
- Constituency: Bhopalgarh
- In office 1957–1967
- Preceded by: Constituency Established
- Succeeded by: Ranjeet Singh
- Constituency: Osian

Leader of Opposition, Rajasthan Legislative Assembly
- In office 31 December 1993 – 30 November 1998
- Preceded by: Hari Dev Joshi
- Succeeded by: Bhairon Singh Shekhawat
- In office 16 February 1979 – 29 August 1979
- Preceded by: Ram Narayan Chaudhary
- Succeeded by: Laxman Singh
- In office 18 July 1977 – 3 November 1978
- Preceded by: Laxman Singh
- Succeeded by: Ram Narayan Chaudhary

President of the Rajasthan Pradesh Congress Committee
- In office 1989–1994
- Preceded by: Ashok Gehlot
- Succeeded by: Ashok Gehlot

Cabinet Minister, Government of Rajasthan
- In office 1982–1985
- Chief Minister: Shiv Charan Mathur
- Ministry and Departments: Ground Water, Irrigation and PHED
- In office 1981–1982
- Ministry and Departments: Energy, Flood & Famine, Irrigation, Land Reforms, PHED and Revenue
- In office 1966–1977
- Chief Minister: Mohan Lal Sukhadia
- Ministry and Departments: Agriculture, Animal Husbandry, Colonization, Community Development, Cooperative, Famine, Flood, Forest, General Administration, Local Bodies, Panchayat Raj, Rehabilitation, Revenue and Sheep & Wool

Personal details
- Born: 23 July 1926 Chadi, Jodhpur State, British India (present-day Rajasthan, India)
- Died: 16 February 2014 (aged 87) Jaipur, Rajasthan, India
- Party: Indian National Congress
- Spouse: Chhoti Devi
- Children: 4, including Mahipal Maderna
- Parent: Natha Ram (father)
- Relatives: Divya Maderna (Grand Daughter)
- Education: M.A., LL.B.
- Alma mater: University of Lucknow
- Nickname: saab

Parasram Maderna (23 July 1926 – 16 February 2014) was an Indian politician who was a nine-time Member of the Legislative Assembly (MLA) in Rajasthan between 1957 and 2003. He was the Speaker of the Rajasthan Legislative Assembly from 1999 to 2004 and a three-time Leader of the Opposition in the Rajasthan Legislative Assembly. A senior Jat leader, he served as a Cabinet Minister in the Rajasthan government for several portfolios. He also served as the President of the Rajasthan Pradesh Congress Committee from 1989 to 1994. He was an MLA from the Bhopalgarh constituency six times, which included four consecutive terms from 1967 to 1985. He also served as MLA twice from the Osian constituency and once from the Gudamalani constituency.

== Early and personal life ==
Maderna was born on 23 July 1926 in Chadi village of the present-day Jodhpur district of Rajasthan. He received his Bachelor of Laws and post-graduation degrees from the University of Lucknow.

Maderna married Chhoti Devi. They had two daughters and two sons, including the politician Mahipal Maderna. His granddaughter Divya Maderna is also a politician.

== Career ==
=== Freedom struggle ===
During his postgraduate studies, Maderna actively engaged in Indian independence movement after taking inspiration from Mahatma Gandhi. Upon his return to Rajasthan, he aligned himself with Baldev Ram Mirdha, a prominent Jat leader, to initiate a large-scale agrarian movement through the Marwar Kisan Sabha and later the Rajasthan Kisan Sabha. This collaborative effort resulted in the abolition of Jagirs in the former Marwar and Mewar estates, empowering cultivating farmers to become owners of their land.

=== Political career ===
Maderna's political career started after India's independence when the Kisan Sabha got merged with the Indian National Congress. Although his first election in 1952 from the Osian Assembly constituency ended in defeat, his public service journey officially commenced in 1953 when he was elected as the Sarpanch of his native village, Chadi.

After losing his first election from the Osian Assembly constituency, Maderna again contested from that constituency, securing back-to-back victories in 1957 and 1962. Bhopalgarh Assembly constituency was created in 1967 and Maderna represented that constituency as an MLA from 1967 to 1985 after winning four successive elections from there. However, he faced a setback in the 1985 election, where he was defeated by Narayan Ram Bera. Maderna made a comeback by winning the next three elections, once from the Gudamalani Constituency in 1993 and twice from the Bhopalgarh constituency in 1990 and 1998.

In 1966, the Government of Rajasthan entrusted Maderna with key ministerial responsibilities, assigning him a diverse portfolio that included General Administration, Panchayat Raj, Agriculture, Revenue, Animal Husbandry, Cooperative, Flood, Forest, Famine, Community Development, Sheep & Wool, Colonization, Local Bodies, and Rehabilitation. He served in this role until 1977. Later, from 1981 to 1985, he was once again appointed as a Cabinet Minister, overseeing portfolios such as Revenue, Irrigation, Land Reforms, Flood & Famine, Public Health Engineering Department (PHED), and Energy.

In the 1998 Rajasthan Legislative Assembly election, Congress secured a clear majority by winning 153 out of 200 seats. Maderna was the leader of the opposition at that time and Ashok Gehlot was the chief of the Rajasthan Pradesh Congress Committee. Gehlot did not contest in that election and Maderna won his seat from the Bhopalgarh constituency. An All India Congress Committee (AICC) was constituted in November 1998 to decide the Chief minister of Congress. It was headed by Ghulam Nabi Azad, Madhavrao Scindia, Mohsina Kidwai, and R. L. Bhatia. They organized a meeting with all of the elected Congress legislators at the state party headquarters. It was agreed in the meeting that the Congress president Sonia Gandhi would decide the CM. She selected Ashok Gehlot for the CM post. In January 1999, Maderna was elected Speaker of the Rajasthan Legislative Assembly unanimously.

His political career also included several notable leadership roles within the Indian National Congress party. He was president of the Rajasthan Pradesh Congress Committee from 1989 to 1994. Additionally, he held the role of Leader of the Opposition in the Rajasthan Legislative Assembly on multiple occasions. He took on this role for the first time from 1977 to 1978, and again from February 1979 to August 1979. His last stint as the Leader of the Opposition started in 1993 and continued until 1998 when his party came into power after winning the 1998 Rajasthan Legislative Assembly election.

Maderna's political career concluded with his tenure as the Speaker of the Rajasthan Legislative Assembly, where he presided from 1999 to 2004.

Furthermore, Maderna's influence extended beyond his elected positions, as he held key roles in various constitutional bodies. He served as a member of the Public Accounts Committee (PAC) and the Estimates Committee. Additionally, he was Chairman of the Central Cooperative Bank, the Committee on Subordinate Legislation, the Public Accounts Committee, and the Public Undertakings Committee.

== Electoral performance ==
1952 Rajasthan Legislative Assembly election: Jodhpur Tehsil North
Party	Candidate	Votes	%	±%
Independent	Mangal Singh	19,419	61.66	
INC	Parasram Maderna	10,148	32.22	
Socialist	Rewat Dan	1,925	6.11	
Majority		9,271	29.44	
Turnout		31,492	51.46	
Independent win (new seat)				

1957 Rajasthan Legislative Assembly election: Osian
Party	Candidate	Votes	%	±%
INC	Parasram Maderna	15,303	64.79	+32.57
PSP	Rewat Dan	8,317	35.21	+29.1
Majority		6,986	29.58	+0.14
Turnout		23,620	44.09	−7.37
INC gain from Independent		Swing		

1962 Rajasthan Legislative Assembly election: Osian
Party	Candidate	Votes	%	±%
INC	Parasram Maderna	17,964	56.78	−8.01
PSP	Rewat Dan	10,721	33.89	−1.32
Independent	Karna	2,951	9.33	
Majority		7,243	22.89	−6.69
Turnout		31636	57.72	+13.63
INC hold		Swing		

1967 Rajasthan Legislative Assembly election: Bhopalgarh
Party	Candidate	Votes	%	±%
INC	Parasram Maderna	26,104	57.10	
SWA	R. Singh	19,113	41.81	
Independent	J. R. Joshi	499	1.09	
Majority		6,991	15.29	
Turnout		45,716	68.00	
INC win (new seat)				

1972 Rajasthan Legislative Assembly election: Bhopalgarh
Party	Candidate	Votes	%	±%
INC	Parasram Maderna	43,323	81.46	+24.36
Independent	Jaswant Singh Chaudhary	8,315	15.63	
Socialist	Prakash Chandra	865	1.63	
Independent	Karna Ram	453	0.85	
Independent	Mangal Prakash	230	0.43	
Majority		35,008	65.83	+50.54
Turnout		53,186	65.72	−2.28
INC hold		Swing		

1977 Rajasthan Legislative Assembly election: Bhopalgarh
Party	Candidate	Votes	%	±%
INC	Parasram Maderna	26,558	50.67	−30.79
JP	Bhairaram Chaudhary	25,856	49.33	
Majority		702	1.34	−64.49
Turnout		52,414	66.52	+0.80
INC hold		Swing		

1980 Rajasthan Legislative Assembly election: Bhopalgarh
Party	Candidate	Votes	%	±%
INC(I)	Parasram Maderna	29,052	51.99	+1.32
JP(S)	Narayan Ram Bera	26,199	46.88	
Independent	Gordhan Choudhary	630	1.13	
Majority		2,853	5.11	+3.77
Turnout		55,881	60.42	−6.10
INC hold		Swing		

1985 Rajasthan Legislative Assembly election: Bhopalgarh
Party	Candidate	Votes	%	±%
LKD	Narayan Ram Bera	37,546	50.21	+3.33
INC	Parasram Maderna	36,870	49.31	−2.68
Independent	Ashok Kumar Vaishnav	358	0.48	
Majority		676	0.90	−4.21
Turnout		74,774	67.67	+7.25
LKD gain from INC		Swing		

1990 Rajasthan Legislative Assembly election: Bhopalgarh
Party	Candidate	Votes	%	±%
INC	Parasram Maderna	43,330	49.71	+0.40
JD	Narayan Ram Bera	40,556	46.53	−3.68
Independent	Dhanna Ram Meghwal	2,560	2.94	
Doordarshi Party	Prem Raj Parihar	413	0.47	
Independent	Madan Lal Jatiya	154	0.18	
Socialist Party (Lohia)	Gordhan Choudhary	154	0.18	
Majority		2,774	3.18	+2.28
Turnout		87,167	66.97	−0.70
INC gain from LKD		Swing		

1993 Rajasthan Legislative Assembly election: Gudamalani
Party	Candidate	Votes	%	±%
INC	Parasram Maderna	44,680	55.17	
BJP	Satya Pal	29,348	36.24	
JD	Hariram Karwasra	2,994	3.70	
Independent	Bhikharam Meghwansi	1,922	2.37	
Independent	Mangilal Kabli	1,220	1.51	
Doordarshi Party	Jawala Prasad	723	0.89	
Independent	Khetaram Meghwal	100	0.12	
Majority		15,332	18.93	−17.85
Turnout		80,987	55.59	+7
INC gain from JD		Swing		

1998 Rajasthan Legislative Assembly election: Bhopalgarh
Party	Candidate	Votes	%	±%
INC	Parasram Maderna	57,312	54.81	
BJP	Bhairaram Chaudhary	33,566	32.10	
BSP	Mana Ram	11,622	11.12	
BKD(J)	Sohan Ram	1,645	1.57	
Independent	Fagloo Ram	415	0.40	
Majority		23,746	22.71	+5.28
Turnout		1,04,560	66.38	+6.74
INC hold		Swing		

== Death ==
Maderna died on 16 February 2014, at the age of 87, due to respiratory failure. He was admitted to SMS Hospital after complaining of breathing problems and swelling in his legs and stomach. He was suffering from osteoarthritis, sepsis, and diabetes. Multiple dignitaries, including the then Chief Minister Vasundhara Raje, Gujarat Governor Kamla Beniwal, Union Minister Lal Chand Kataria, and AICC's general secretary C. P. Joshi, paid homage to him once his body was brought to his residence. He was cremated by his son Mahipal Maderna the next day in his native village Chadi, Jodhpur. Other than MLAs and MPs, his funeral was attended by the then chief minister of Haryana Bhupinder Singh Hooda, former chief minister Ashok Gehlot, Sachin Pilot, and the then Rajasthan Legislative Assembly Speaker Kailash Chandra Meghwal.
