= Bhopalgarh Assembly constituency =

Constituency of the Rajasthan legislative assembly in India

Coordinates: 26.65°N 73.49°E

Bhopalgarh
- Constituency No. 126 for the Rajasthan Legislative Assembly

Constituency details
- Country: India
- Region: North India
- State: Rajasthan
- District: Jodhpur district
- Established: 1967
- Reservation: SC

Member of Legislative Assembly
- 16th Rajasthan Legislative Assembly
- Incumbent Geeta Barwar
- Party: Indian National Congress
- Elected year: 2023
- Preceded by: Pukhraj Garg

Bhopalgarh Assembly constituency is one of constituencies of Rajasthan Legislative Assembly in the Pali Lok Sabha constituency. Senior Congress leaders like Paras Ram Maderna used to contest election from this seat Also during the first election in 1967 Ram Singh Bishnoi contested from this constituency.

== Members of the Legislative Assembly ==
Year	Name	Party
1967	Parasram Maderna	Indian National Congress
1972	Parasram Maderna	Indian National Congress
1977	Parasram Maderna	Indian National Congress
1980	Parasram Maderna	Indian National Congress
1985	Narain Ram Bera	Lok Dal
1990	Parasram Maderna	Indian National Congress
1993	Ramnarain Dudi	Indian National Congress
1998	Parasram Maderna	Indian National Congress
2003	Mahipal Maderna	Indian National Congress
2008	Kamsa Meghwal	Bharatiya Janata Party
2013	Kamsa Meghwal	Bharatiya Janata Party
2018	Pukhraj Garg	Rashtriya Loktantrik Party
2023	Geeta Barwar	Indian National Congress

== Election results ==
=== 2023 ===
2023 Rajasthan Legislative Assembly election: Bhopalgarh (SC)
Party	Candidate	Votes	%	±%
INC	Geeta Barwar	86,224	42.53	+9.4
RLP	Pukhraj Garg	61,926	30.55	−5.17
BJP	Kamsa Meghwal	49,540	24.44	+0.52
NOTA	None of the above	1,848	0.91	−0.46
Majority		24,298	11.98	+9.39
Turnout		202,729	66.42	−2.3
INC gain from RLP		Swing		

=== 2018 ===
2018 Rajasthan Legislative Assembly election: Bhopalgarh (SC)
Party	Candidate	Votes	%	±%
RLP	Pukhraj Garg	68,386	35.72	
INC	Bhanwarlal Balai	63,424	33.13	
BJP	Kamsa Meghwal	45,802	23.92	
Abhinav Rajasthan Party	Gumanram	5,560	2.9	
Independent	Setharam	2,285	1.19	
BSP	Ramsukh	2,281	1.19	
NOTA	None of the above	2,632	1.37	
Majority		4,962	2.59	
Turnout		191,458	68.72	
RLP gain from BJP		Swing		

=== 2013 ===
2013 Rajasthan Legislative Assembly election: Bhopalgarh (SC)
Party	Candidate	Votes	%	±%
BJP	Kamsa Meghwal	88,521	57.25	+15.08
INC	Omprakash	52,711	34.09	
BSP	Jaga Ram	3,899	2.52	
Independent	Allaram	2,338	1.51	
Independent	Shanta Kumari	1,773	1.15	
Independent	Beera Ram	1,074	0.69	
NPP	Sarwan Ram	996	0.64	
Jago Party	Lekhraj	648	0.42	
NOTA	None of the above	2,666	1.72	
Majority		35,810	23.16	+19.23
Turnout		1,54,626	64.35	+11.65
BJP hold		Swing		

=== 2008 ===
2008 Rajasthan Legislative Assembly election: Bhopalgarh (SC)
Party	Candidate	Votes	%	±%
BJP	Kamsa Meghwal	48,311	42.17	
INC	Heera Devi	43,810	38.24	
Independent	Ram Avtar Baori	9,658	8.43	
BSP	Sanjeev Kumar	7,607	6.64	
BBP	Shivdan Meghwal	2,507	2.19	
LJP	Geeta Meghwal	1,828	1.60	−0.76
Independent	Durga Ram Meghwal	835	0.73	
Majority		4,501	3.93	−0.15
Turnout		1,14,556	52.70	−13.12
BJP gain from INC		Swing		

=== 2003 ===
2003 Rajasthan Legislative Assembly election: Bhopalgarh
Party	Candidate	Votes	%	±%
INC	Mahipal Maderna	43,659	35.76	
BJP	Narayan Ram Bera	38,675	31.68	
Rajasthan Samajik Nyaya Manch	Dhanna Ram	19,261	15.78	
BSP	Pradeep Gehlot	17,605	14.42	
LJP	Geeta Meghwal	2,876	2.36	
Majority		4,984	4.08	−18.63
Turnout		1,22,076	65.82	−0.56
INC hold		Swing		

=== 1998 ===
1998 Rajasthan Legislative Assembly election: Bhopalgarh
Party	Candidate	Votes	%	±%
INC	Parasram Maderna	57,312	54.81	
BJP	Bhairaram Chaudhary	33,566	32.10	
BSP	Mana Ram	11,622	11.12	
BKD(J)	Sohan Ram	1,645	1.57	
Independent	Fagloo Ram	415	0.40	
Majority		23,746	22.71	+5.28
Turnout		1,04,560	66.38	+6.74
INC hold		Swing		

=== 1993 ===
1993 Rajasthan Legislative Assembly election: Bhopalgarh
Party	Candidate	Votes	%	±%
INC	Ramnarayan Dudi	35,915	41.85	
JD	Narayan Ram Bera	20,960	24.42	−22.11
BJP	Braham Singh Parihar	19,742	23.00	
Independent	Sumer Singh Gajsinghpura	6,545	7.63	
Independent	Prem Raj Parihar	703	0.82	+0.35
Independent	Manohar Singh Bhati	479	0.56	
Independent	Pema Ram Mali	454	0.53	
Independent	Ladu Ram Jakhad	423	0.49	
Independent	Hirta Ram Phiroda	246	0.29	
Independent	Sangram Singh	190	0.22	
Socialist Party (Lohia)	Gordhan Ram	163	0.19	+0.01
Majority		14,995	17.43	+14.25
Turnout		85,820	59.64	−7.33
INC hold		Swing		

=== 1990 ===
1990 Rajasthan Legislative Assembly election: Bhopalgarh
Party	Candidate	Votes	%	±%
INC	Parasram Maderna	43,330	49.71	+0.40
JD	Narayan Ram Bera	40,556	46.53	−3.68
Independent	Dhanna Ram Meghwal	2,560	2.94	
Doordarshi Party	Prem Raj Parihar	413	0.47	
Independent	Madan Lal Jatiya	154	0.18	
Socialist Party (Lohia)	Gordhan Choudhary	154	0.18	
Majority		2,774	3.18	+2.28
Turnout		87,167	66.97	−0.70
INC gain from LKD		Swing		

=== 1985 ===
1985 Rajasthan Legislative Assembly election: Bhopalgarh
Party	Candidate	Votes	%	±%
LKD	Narayan Ram Bera	37,546	50.21	+3.33
INC	Parasram Maderna	36,870	49.31	−2.68
Independent	Ashok Kumar Vaishnav	358	0.48	
Majority		676	0.90	−4.21
Turnout		74,774	67.67	+7.25
LKD gain from INC		Swing		

=== 1980 ===
1980 Rajasthan Legislative Assembly election: Bhopalgarh
Party	Candidate	Votes	%	±%
INC(I)	Parasram Maderna	29,052	51.99	+1.32
JP(S)	Narayan Ram Bera	26,199	46.88	
Independent	Gordhan Choudhary	630	1.13	
Majority		2,853	5.11	+3.77
Turnout		55,881	60.42	−6.10
INC hold		Swing		

=== 1977 ===
1977 Rajasthan Legislative Assembly election: Bhopalgarh
Party	Candidate	Votes	%	±%
INC	Parasram Maderna	26,558	50.67	−30.79
JP	Bhairaram Chaudhary	25,856	49.33	
Majority		702	1.34	−64.49
Turnout		52,414	66.52	+0.80
INC hold		Swing		

=== 1972 ===
1972 Rajasthan Legislative Assembly election: Bhopalgarh
Party	Candidate	Votes	%	±%
INC	Parasram Maderna	43,323	81.46	+24.36
Independent	Jaswant Singh Chaudhary	8,315	15.63	
Socialist	Prakash Chandra	865	1.63	
Independent	Karna Ram	453	0.85	
Independent	Mangal Prakash	230	0.43	
Majority		35,008	65.83	+50.54
Turnout		53,186	65.72	−2.28
INC hold		Swing		

=== 1967 ===
1967 Rajasthan Legislative Assembly election: Bhopalgarh
Party	Candidate	Votes	%	±%
INC	Parasram Maderna	26,104	57.10	
SWA	R. Singh	19,113	41.81	
Independent	J. R. Joshi	499	1.09	
Majority		6,991	15.29	
Turnout		45,716	68.00	
INC win (new seat)				

== See also ==
- Member of the Legislative Assembly (India)
