= Bhanwari Devi murder case =

Murder case in India

Bhanwari Devi
- Born: 1974 or 1975; Kishangarh block, Ajmer, Rajasthan, India
- Died: 1 September 2011 (age 36)
- Cause of death: Murder

Bhanwari Devi was a 36-year-old auxiliary nurse midwife.

== Background ==
Bhanwari Devi was born in poverty in a village in Kishangarh block of Ajmer district, in India's Rajasthan State. Her parents worked as daily wage labourers; her father was also employed in the State's medical and health department. Devi studied in a government-run school up to Class 8. At the age of 16, she was married off to Amarchand of Borunda village in Jodhpur. At the behest of her father, Devi studied midwifery and got the job as an auxiliary nurse midwife with the same department. During the time of her murder, she was posted at a sub-centre in Jaliwada, a village in Jodhpur district.

Deccan Herald reported that it was during her time as a midwife that Devi got in touch with politicians mostly from the ruling Indian National Congress in connection with her transfers and postings. The report added that "she was quick to realise the power of sex appeal among the politicians and bureaucrats. She not only got choice postings but also arranged it for others for a price." It was reported that within a short span of time, Devi amassed wealth beyond her means as a midwife and led a lavish life maintaining several houses and cars. The CBI said that she bought expensive gold ornaments every year. It added that Amarchand remained working as a vehicle driver during this time and "branded as a drunkard". They had three children together.

The report further added that Devi became over ambitious with time and had demanded a ticket to contest the 2013 Legislative Assembly elections from the Bhopalgarh constituency. Upon being unsuccessful, she began blackmailing the said leaders demanding money in exchange for a 52-minute long video CD in which they were seen in compromising positions with her. Among them were Mahipal Maderna, a cabinet minister with the Rajasthan government, and Luni MLA Malkhan Singh Bishnoi, who had maintained an illicit relationship with her for over a decade. She had reportedly been threatening Bishnoi of disclosing his illegitimate child (Devi's younger daughter) in a community gathering on 7 September 2011, or give at least 20 kg of gold jewellery and spend at least ₹50 lakh on their daughter's wedding who was only seven at the time. She also persisted that he prepare to undergo a paternity test. After Maderna appeared unwilling to buy her repeated claims in relation to the CD, on 24 August 2011, she leaked a part of the CD to a local television news channel and a newspaper which carried the photographs from the CD without directly mentioning his name but giving enough clues that it was Maderna. Devi reportedly went missing on 1 September. Her husband alleged that she was abducted on orders of Maderna.

== Investigation ==
Under pressure from protests over Maderna's involvement in the murder, the Rajasthan government transferred the case for investigation to the CBI on 15 September. On 23 September, a court directed the government to register an FIR against Maderna. On being rebuked by the Rajasthan High Court about his government's inaction in the case, Chief Minister Ashok Gehlot asked Maderna to resign from his post as a cabinet minister, who refused, following which he subsequently sacked him from the Cabinet on 16 October 2011.

The CBI said that Maderna brought in his confidante Sahiram Bishnoi, who hired Sohan Lal Bishnoi, a contractor with the Rajasthan government's Public Health Engineering Department and Devi's friend, to settle the issue. The Bishnois with the help of a local criminal named Shahabuddin, hatched a plot to get hold of the CD at any cost over a series of meetings at the Circuit House in Jodhpur in the first week of August 2011, prior to Devi's leaking of the CD. The matter was agreed to be settled for ₹50 lakh, and the CBI said that an advance amount of ₹2.5 lakh had been paid to them by Maderna, while a promise of paying the remaining amount by the September end was made. As per plan, Sohan Lal Bishnoi got into another deal with Bhanwari; he was reportedly buying her a car, a Maruti Suzuki Swift for ₹4.5 lakh and that an advance payment of ₹50,000 had been made.

The CBI investigation revealed that on 1 September, Devi was lured by Sohan Lal Bishnoi to Bilara to make the remaining payment for the car. It was also subject to the verification of the CD, on board the Mahindra Bolero vehicle, belonging to Shahabuddin, which had a video CD player. He was said to have watched the entire CD then. Once in Bilara, the gang roamed around the area with Devi by the car which she reportedly resisted. This was when the three strangled her. Subsequently, under the directions of Sahiram Bishnoi, they handed her over to some unidentified persons who were on another vehicle, a Mahindra Scorpio.

=== Initial evidence ===
On 3 November, as first evidence in the case, the CBI recovered a four-minute audio clip of a conversation between Devi and Indira, the sister of Malkhan Singh Bishnoi. In the clip, the CBI said that Bhanwari is heard speaking to Indira in Marwari language telling her that the politicians had agreed to pay her ₹7 crore in exchange for the CD, out of she would get ₹5 crore and that Sohan Lal Bishnoi would take the rest. She was also heard telling Bishnoi that the contractor Sohan Lal had struck the deal with the alleged Delhi-based high-profile power broker through one Sunil Gurjar and that the payment had already been made. She reiterated that Sohan Lal somehow got hold of duplicate CDs but the original was still with her. It transpired that Gurjar, whom Bhanwari referred to as the middleman between the Delhi-based buyer of the CD who tried to sell the CD, and Sohan Lal, is a relative of Puducherry's former lieutenant governor and minister of Rajasthan Govind Singh Gurjar.

In November 2011, Shahabuddin's girlfriend Rehana leaked the audio clip of her discussion with him in the Jodhpur Central Jail, where he was lodged, in the media. During the discussion, Shahabuddin was reportedly heard telling her that Devi was handed over to the gang of Pradeep Godara, a criminal wanted by the Rajasthan Police in several cases. Shahabuddin was also heard saying that he had been falsely implicated in the case, and did not know what happened to Devi. This was the third audio clip that the CBI had in its possession. During this time, the CBI while interrogating Rehana, also questioned one Lakha Ram and Bhanwari's husband Amarchand. The latter was called to identify the jewellery, reportedly seized by the CBI from a jeweller in Jodhpur. They suspected that it belonged to Devi and that Shahabuddin had sold the jewellery while he was in the city soon after former went missing.

=== Arrests ===
Shahbuddin, who carried a ₹25,000 cash reward on his head, was the first to surrender before the police, on 22 October 2011. During the interrogation of Maderna on 10 November, he confessed to have been in an affair with Devi. The CBI filed its preliminary chargesheet on 2 December. On the same night they arrested Maderna and was brought to Delhi two days later for interrogation. On 8 December, Devi's husband Amarchand was arrested by the CBI after he gave conflicting versions during interrogation while remaining "un-cooperative". On 19 December, Malkhan Singh Bishnoi was arrested. Upon questioning by the CBI, both he and Maderna maintained innocence.

On 4 January 2012, the CBI brought Sahiram Bishnoi face to face with Maderna and two other accused, Sohan Lal Bishnoi and Shahabuddin in the Jodhpur Central Jail. On the same day, the police arrested Bishna Ram Bishnoi, another accused in the case, in Pune. He was the eleventh person to be arrested in connection with the case, all of whom maintained their innocence. Kailash Jakhar, who allegedly disposed of her body, was also found following a tip-off and arrested the same day in a major breakthrough as part of the investigation. Jakhar reportedly admitted with the police to have picked up Devi's body from the Bishnois and Shahabuddin in Bilara on 1 September 2011 and disposed her off by burning her remains somewhere in Jaloda, a village near Phalodi, a town in Jodhpur district. Jakhar was reportedly a member of the Bishna Ram Bishnoi gang, which was also then wanted by the CBI and carried a cash reward of ₹5 lakh on his head. The CBI had by then already arrested Bishna Ram's brother Om Prakash Bishnoi.

On 6 January, the CBI claimed to know the whereabouts of disposal of Bhanwari Devi's body. The case was thus cracked by the CBI inside 100 days and were ready to file the final chargesheet by the end of that month. The 12 members arrested till then were:

- Mahipal Maderna
- Malkhan Singh Bishnoi
- Sahiram Bishnoi
- Sohanlal Bishnoi
- Shahabuddin
- Balia
- Bishnaram Bishnoi
- Om Prakash Bishnoi
- Kailash Jakhar
- Parasram Bishnoi, coordinator between the two gangs and Malkhan Singh's brother
- Amarchand, Devi's husband
- Umeshram Bishnoi, an aide of Sahiram Bishnoi

On 17 January 2012, another of Bishnaram's gang, Ashok Bishnoi, who was allegedly involved in the disposal of Devi's body, surrendered before the police.

=== Operation Watch ===
'Operation Watch' was launched to collect evidence in connection to Bhanwari Devi's murder. The Rajasthan Police and the CBI accompanied by forensic experts from the Central Forensic Science Laboratory were involved in it. While searching for evidence in the Rajeev Gandhi Lift Canal near the village of Jaloda and 100 kilometres (62 mi) from Jodhpur, a cricket bat that was used to hit Bhanwari Devi on the head and two country-made pistols were recovered. The bat was found wrapped in barbed wire, presumably to ensure that it sank to the bottom of the canal. Bishna Ram Bishnoi and Kailash Jakhar, both the accused in disposing of Bhawari's body, were taken to the spot to recreate the scene of the crime. At the end of the four-day search, body remains including part of a skull, five teeth and portions of it, and charred bone fragments; a ladies' wrist watch; jewellery parts such as beads of a necklace, a pendant, an earring, toe ring, nose pin and other broken pieces of jewellery were recovered, apart from a gunny bag and some clothes which reportedly belonged to Jakhar. Valuables belonging to his mother were identified by her son Sahil, and she was subsequently declared dead by the Rajasthan Police.

As the bone fragments and other body parts such as teeth recovered remained unverified that they were Bhanwari Devi's, they were sent to the Federal Bureau of Investigation (FBI), which held expertise in establishing DNA from the dentures, for verification. Prior to this, in February 2012, forensic experts from the AIIMS submitted a report stating that the bones were that of animals. In June, the FBI confirmed that they belonged to Bhanwari Devi.

=== Charge sheet ===
In a second charge sheet the CBI projected Malkhan Singh as Bhanwari's onetime partner. Malkhan Singh used her to upstage Maderna but later allied with Maderna to murder her. Malkhan's sister Indira Devi and Bhanwari Devi planned to shoot controversial video to make it public later and malign Maderna. But contrary to Malkhan's plan Bhanwari started to blackmail Malkhan too. Additionally Indira Devi who was absconding acted as a troubleshooter for both leaders while dealing with Bhanwari. Indira interfered whenever Bhanwari threatened to go public about the tape. In the charge sheet against 13 accused, Maderna and Malkhan Singh were charged with murder, abduction, criminal conspiracy and destruction of evidence. Amarchand, Bhanwari's husband was charged with criminal conspiracy, destruction of evidence and abduction. Investigation against four persons including absconding Indira Devi are pending. In another revelation CBI said that a DNA test proved that Bhanwari's youngest daughter Gungun was fathered by Malkhan.

The CBI chargesheet in the Bhanwari Devi murder case describes her as a social climber with "big ambitions". Former Rajasthan cabinet minister Mahipal Maderna and Congress MLA Malkhan Singh Bishnoi, both charged with murder, are depicted as men fond of "sura aur sundari" (wine and women).

The chargesheet also mentions that Bhanwari made two video recordings, in different locations, showing Maderna and her in a "compromising position".

== Family ==
Bhanwari had three children with her husband Amar Chand — daughters Ashwini and Suhani, and son Sahil. Investigation into the murder later revealed that the father of their youngest daughter Suhani was Malkhan Singh Bishnoi. On account of abetting the murder at the behest of some politicians and accepting money for the crime, Amar Chand was arrested, and while he remained in judicial custody in January 2012, the Chief Minister of Rajasthan Ashok Gehlot promised financial compensation and assistance with work and education for them as they faced social stigma.
