= Gangapur Assembly constituency =

Gangapur Assembly constituency may refer to

- Gangapur, Maharashtra Assembly constituency
- Gangapur, Rajasthan Assembly constituency
