= Bilkis Bano case =

Criminal case in Gujarat, India

The Bilkis Bano case was an Indian criminal case which found 11 men guilty of murder and gang rape during the 2002 Gujarat riots. The victims were Bilkis Bano, who was raped while five months pregnant, and 16 members of her family. The case gained national and international attention as an example of the perceived systemic failures in addressing violence and crimes against women during heightened communal tensions.

== Background ==
During the 2002 Gujarat riots in India, Bilkis Yakub Rasool, who was five-months pregnant at the time, fled her home in the village of Randhikpur with 16 other members, in an attempt to escape the violence sweeping the region after the Godhra Incident. The group sought refuge in the Chhaparvad but were attacked by a mob of 20–30 men armed with sickles, swords, and stones who killed fourteen of Bilkis' family members, of which eight minors included her three-year-old daughter, two brothers, two sisters, two cousins and a cousin's two day old infant, and six other members include her mother, two cousins, maternal uncle, paternal uncle and paternal aunt. Twelve men from the mob were named convicts in gang-rape of her, her mother and her cousin Shamim, who had delivered a baby two days before. Out of the 17, only Bilkis and two men survived the attack.

== Criminal proceeding ==
A first information report (FIR) was registered on 4 March 2002 against unknowns. The Godhra police filed a closure report stating that the accused could not be traced which was accepted by Judicial Magistrate despite the evidence. After dismissal of the case against her assailants, Bano approached the National Human Rights Commission of India (NHRC) and petitioned the Supreme Court seeking a reinvestigation. The Supreme Court granted the motion, directing the Central Bureau of Investigation (CBI) to take over the investigation. The CBI appointed a team of experts from the Central Forensic Science Laboratory (CFSL) Delhi and All India Institute of Medical Sciences (AIIMS) led by Professor T. D. Dogra to exhume the mass graves to establish the identity and cause of death of the victims, successfully doing so.

The trial of the case was transferred out of Gujarat on the fears of bias in the judiciary towards the perpetrators and into a court in Mumbai, Maharashtra in August 2004. The union government was directed to appoint a public prosecutor. Charges were filed against twenty people as well as six police officials and two government doctors over their role in the initial investigations in a court in Mumbai.

In January 2008, eleven men were sentenced to life imprisonment for rapes and murders and a policeman was convicted of falsifying evidence. The Bombay High Court upheld the life imprisonment of the eleven men convicted for the gang rape of Bilkis Bano and the murder of her family members during the 2002 Gujarat riots on 8 May 2017. The court also set aside the acquittal of the remaining seven accused in the case, including Gujarat police officers and doctors of a government hospital, who were charged with suppressing and tampering with evidence.

== Civil compensation ==
On 23 April 2019, the Supreme Court ordered the Government of Gujarat pay Bano ₹50 lakh as compensation, along with a job in the government and housing in the area of her choice. It is the first riot case to be transferred out of Gujarat to the Supreme court as well as the first riot case to result in a monetary compensation to the victim.

== Remission ==
In 2019, Radheshyam Bhagwandas Shah, one of the men convicted in the case approached the Gujarat High court challenging non-consideration of his application for premature release under section 432, 433 and 433A of Code of Criminal Procedure (CrCP), 1973 which recommended seeking remedy in the state of Maharashtra which received negative report by CBI special court, Mumbai in 2020. Other convicts also applied for remission in February 2021.

In March 2022, Bhagwandas Shah approached the Supreme Court that the Gujarat State Government had an obligation to consider his early release as per the state's 1992 remission policy. State governments may enact remission policies to allow individuals or certain classes of individuals to file applications for early release from prison. The Supreme Court allowed the transfer of conclusion and conviction of the trial to the state of Gujarat and observed precedent set by State of Haryana vs. Jagdish, (2010) 4 SCC 216 (“Jagdish”), that grant of premature release will have to be considered on the basis of policy which stood as of the date of conviction, which was the 1992 remission policy passed by the state of Gujarat.

The Superintendent of Police, Dahod, District Magistrate, Dahod, Jail Advisory Committee of Gujarat, the superintendent of Godhra Sub-jail and Prisons and Correctional Administration, Gujarat had submitted positive reports on the premature release while Special Crime Branch, Mumbai and the concerning trial court in Mumbai had submitted negative reports. All ten members of the jail advisory committee of Gujarat were government appointees and included five office bearers in the Bharatiya Janata Party (BJP), the state government at the time of the riots, among which two were MLAs. A BJP MLA, one of the panelists, has said that some of the convicts are "Brahmins" with good 'sanskaar' or values.

Based on the reports and the Supreme Court order, the Department of Home Affairs, Gujarat, gained approval for premature release by the Ministry of Home Affairs, Government of India under section 435 of CrPC in August 2022. On 15 August 2022, the eleven men sentenced to life imprisonment in the case were released from a Godhra jail by the Gujarat government. The judge who sentenced the rapists stated that the early release by the Gujarat government sets a bad precedent and warned that the move would have wide ramifications with convicts opting to seek similar reliefs.

Following their release from jail, the convicts were welcomed with sweets, and some people touched their feet in respect. Vishva Hindu Parishad (VHP) and Rashtriya Swayamsevak Sangh (RSS) also held functions to felicitate and honour the released men. Two days after the remission, Bilkis Bano issued a statement expressing her grief, saying, "The release of these convicts has taken from me my peace and shaken my faith in justice." Fearing for their safety, many Muslim residents subsequently left their homes in her village.

== Supreme Court decision on remission ==
On 18 August 2022, around 6,000 signatories, including activists, eminent writers, historians, filmmakers, journalists and former bureaucrats, urged the Supreme Court to revoke the early release of the convicted individuals, while parties in the opposition such as the INC criticized the BJP. The convicts harassed the witnesses of the case when they were out on parole as recently as 2021, which added to the criticism of the remission.

A few days later, the Supreme Court agreed to look into the plea challenging the release. A bench comprising the Chief Justice of India N. V. Ramana, Justice Ajay Rastogi, and Justice Vikram Nath however posed a query with respect to the legal bar on grant of remission to the convicts.

On 8 January 2024, the Supreme Court of India held that the Gujarat government was not competent to grant remission because the remission could only be granted by the government of the state where the trial was held, namely Maharashtra. The Court struck down the remission granted to the 11 men who had been sentenced to life imprisonment and ordered that the men surrender themselves to the authorities within 15 days. All 11 convicts surrendered at the Godhra sub-jail on 21 January 2024, shortly before the expiry of the deadline set by the Supreme Court.

On 28 October 2026, the Supreme Court granted bail to Bipinchand Joshi and Pradip Modhiya, noting that no 'overt' act was attributed against the two with insufficient evidence beyond their presence with a mob, noting that one of the appellants did not appear in the initial FIR but was added three years after the crime. Bano stated that the Supreme Court issued the order without informing her and that she will fight the order.
