= Geeta Barwar =

Indian politician

Member of the Rajasthan Legislative Assembly
- Incumbent
- Assumed office 3 December 2023
- Preceded by: Pukhraj Garg
- Constituency: Bhopalgarh

Personal details
- Born: 1 December 1975 (age 50) Amarpura, Shergarh, Jodhpur, Rajasthan
- Party: Indian National Congress
- Education: B.A., L.L.B., DCLFS, B.E.d
- Alma mater: Jai Narain Vyas University
- Occupation: MLA
- Profession: Business
- Website: Rajasthan Assembly Profile

Geeta Barwar (born 31 December 1975) is an Indian politician currently serving as the 16th Member of the Rajasthan Legislative Assembly from Bhopalgarh. She is a member of the Indian National Congress.
