= Ramkesh Meena =

Indian politician (born 1957)

Deputy Leader of the Opposition, Rajasthan Legislative Assembly
- Incumbent
- Assumed office 29 July 2024
- Speaker: Vasudev Devnani
- Leader of the Opposition: Tika Ram Jully (19 January 2024–present)
- Chief Minister: Bhajan Sharma
- Preceded by: Satish Poonia

Member of Rajasthan Legislative Assembly
- Incumbent
- Assumed office 2018
- Preceded by: Man Singh Gurjar, BJP
- Constituency: Gangapur
- In office 2008–2013
- Preceded by: Durga Prasad, INC
- Succeeded by: Man Singh Gurjar, BJP
- Constituency: Gangapur

Personal details
- Born: 15 August 1957 (age 68) Gangapur, Rajasthan, India
- Party: Indian National Congress
- Other political affiliations: Bahujan Samaj Party
- Spouse: Gopali Devi (m. 1975)
- Occupation: Politician

Ramkesh Meena (born 15 August 1957) is an Indian politician currently serving as Deputy Leader of the Opposition, Rajasthan Legislative Assembly. He is a member of 13th and 15th Legislative Assembly of Rajasthan. He has been appointed an advisor to the present Chief Minister of Rajasthan, Ashok Gehlot. He is also the state president of Rajasthan Adivasi Meena Seva Sangh. He is a member of the Indian National Congress. He has also been a member of Bahujan Samaj Party in the past.

== Personal life ==
He received his master's degree in M.A.(History) from Rajasthan University in 1982.

== Political career ==
Meena is an Indian politician serving as Member of 15th Rajasthan Legislative Assembly. In the 2018 general election, he defeated his nearest Bharatiya Janata Party candidate Mansingh Gurjar by 10,000 votes.

== Positions held ==
From	To	Position
2008	2013	Member, 13th Legislative Assembly of Rajasthan
2018	Incumbent	Member, 15th Legislative Assembly of Rajasthan

=== Other positions held ===
From	To	Position
	Incumbent	State president, Rajasthan Adivasi Meena Seva Sangh
