= Mahipal Maderna =

Indian politician (1952–2021)

Member of Rajasthan Legislative Assembly
- In office 2008 – 2013
- Preceded by: Banne Singh
- Succeeded by: Bhairaram Chaudhary
- Constituency: Osian

Personal details
- Born: 5 March 1952 Lakshman nagar, India
- Died: 17 October 2021 (aged 69) Jodhpur, India
- Other political affiliations: Indian National Congress
- Spouse: Leela Maderna
- Children: 2, including Divya Maderna
- Parent: Parasram Maderna (father)
- Education: Jodhpur University (B.A., LL.B.)
- As of 10 November, 2011 Source: [Rajasthan Legislative Assembly profile]

Mahipal Parasram Maderna (5 March 1952 – 17 October 2021) was an Indian politician from Rajasthan belonging to the Indian National Congress. He served as a Cabinet Minister in the Government of Rajasthan and was a prominent leader from the Jodhpur region. He was the son of veteran Congress leader and former Speaker of the Rajasthan Legislative Assembly, Parasram Maderna. He represented the Osian constituency in the Rajasthan assembly and held various ministerial portfolios, including Water Resources, during his political career, which was later overshadowed by his involvement in the Bhanwari Devi case.

== Early life and education ==
Mahipal Maderna was born to a farming family of Lakshman nagar on 5 March 1952. His father Parasram Maderna served as a cabinet minister in the Rajasthan Legislative Assembly. He was educated as a lawyer, and held an LL.B.

== Political career ==
Like his father, he joined the Indian National Congress and entered politics. Maderna was elected as the chief of Jodhpur Zilla Parishad in 1981, 1988, 1994 and 2000. On 5 December 2003, he was elected to the 12th State Legislative Assembly from Bhopalgarh. He was elected to the 13th State Legislative Assembly from Osian, Jodhpur. He was inducted as cabinet minister for water resources.

== Death ==
Maderna died from cancer on 17 October 2021 at the age of 69 at his residence in Jodhpur.

== Controversy ==
=== Bhanwari Devi case (2011) ===
In 2011, Mahipal Maderna was accused of being involved in a case relating to the disappearance of a nurse named Bhanwari Devi. Bhanwari, who worked as an auxiliary nurse/midwife in the Jaliwada village (Bilara tehsil), went missing on 1 September. Her husband, Amarchand, alleged that she was abducted on orders of Maderna. Subsequently, the Chief Minister Ashok Gehlot sacked Maderna as a minister on 26 October. It was alleged that Bhanwari Devi was negotiating a multi-crore deal with Maderna and his opponents to trade of a CD in which she was seen in a "compromising position" with Maderna and others. In November 2011, Rehana, the girlfriend of the key suspect Shahabuddin, leaked an audio clip to the reporters. The clip was recorded during her discussion with Shahabuddin in the Jodhpur Central Jail. In the clip, Shahabuddin is heard telling Rehana that Bhanwari Devi was handed over to the gang of Pradeep Godara, a criminal wanted by the Rajasthan police in several cases. He is also heard telling that he had been falsely implicated in the case, and had no clue what happened to Bhanwari.

CBI arrested Maderna on 3 December and questioned him. He was confronted with the key suspects, Sahiram Bishnoi, Shahabuddin and Sohan Lal Bishnoi in jail. Later it was revealed that Maderna and Congress legislator Malkhan Singh were hand-in-glove in the entire conspiracy as the nurse was blackmailing both of them. The two politicians allegedly roped in Sahiram Bishnoi, who hired Sohan Lal, Balia and Shahabuddin for the task of kidnapping the nurse. On 6 January Central Bureau of Investigation claimed to know whereabouts of disposal of Bhanwari Devi's body. Investigating officers were praised by the Central Bureau of Investigation director for solving this case in 100 days. The agency is about to file a second charge sheet after the admission of the Bishnaram gang on the disposal of Bhanwari Devi's body at Jaloda village near Osian village in Jodhpur.

=== Dilip Singh murder case ===
Earlier in 1970, Maderna, along with Vijay Poonia, was also accused of the murder of a student, Dilip Singh, nephew of Bhairon Singh Shekhawat (ex-VP, India) in Jaipur. On 3 February 1970, Dilip Singh was allegedly beaten at room no.42 in Vivekanand hostel, and an FIR was lodged at Gandhinagar Police Station with offences under Sections 307 and 452 read with Section 149, and Section 148, IPC.

Dilip Singh succumbed to injuries on 14 February 1970. Later, the investigation was handed over to CBI and the case was altered to one for offences under Sections 148, 302, 307, 453 read with Section 149 and Section 120B, IPC. However, both the principal accused were acquitted subsequently.
