= Bibek Maitra =

Indian politician (1965 – 2006)

Bibek Biman Maitra (28 July 1965 – 3 June 2006) was Bharatiya Janata Party's (BJP) General Secretary Pramod Mahajan's secretary. The media used to pronounce Bibek Maitra's name as Vivek Moitra. He always insisted that his name be pronounced as Bibek.

== Life ==
After completing his post-graduation in law from the Mumbai University, he joined the Bharatiya Janata Party's Student wing. During this period he started assisting Gopinath Munde, (Pramod Mahajan's brother-in-law). With this he started becoming close to Pramod Mahajan and very soon Mahajan appointed him as his secretary. He worked for almost 15 years with Mahajan.

He was also known for his lavish lifestyle and the parties he attended, but only after his death was this reported in the media. He remained bachelor throughout his life. Maitra was Mahajan's close confidant and used to handle all his financial matters

== Death ==
Maitra died on 3 June 2006. The autopsy was conducted by board headed by Prof T. D Dogra report released by the All India Institute of Medical Sciences (AIIMS) stated that the cause of the death was due to drug overdose.

On the night of 31 May, he was allegedly having champagne with Pramod Mahajan's son Rahul. Sahil Zaroo, a 21-year-old friend of Maitra came visiting them at Pramod Mahajan's official bungalow in Delhi at 7, Safdurjung Road. It also alleged that Sahil brought cocaine on that night with three of his other friends.

Due to the lethal combination of Cocaine and Champagne, Maitra started to vomit and was rushed to Apollo Hospital in New Delhi by Harish Sharma (Pramod Mahajan's Secretary). Maitra was declared dead on arrival.

His family and close associates still maintain that it was attempt to poison both Sahil and Maitra and deny the charges that they were in the habit of taking drugs.

His father, a retired bureaucrat had settled in Khargar, Navi Mumbai and Bibek was cremated at Turbhe.
