= Divya Maderna =

Indian politician

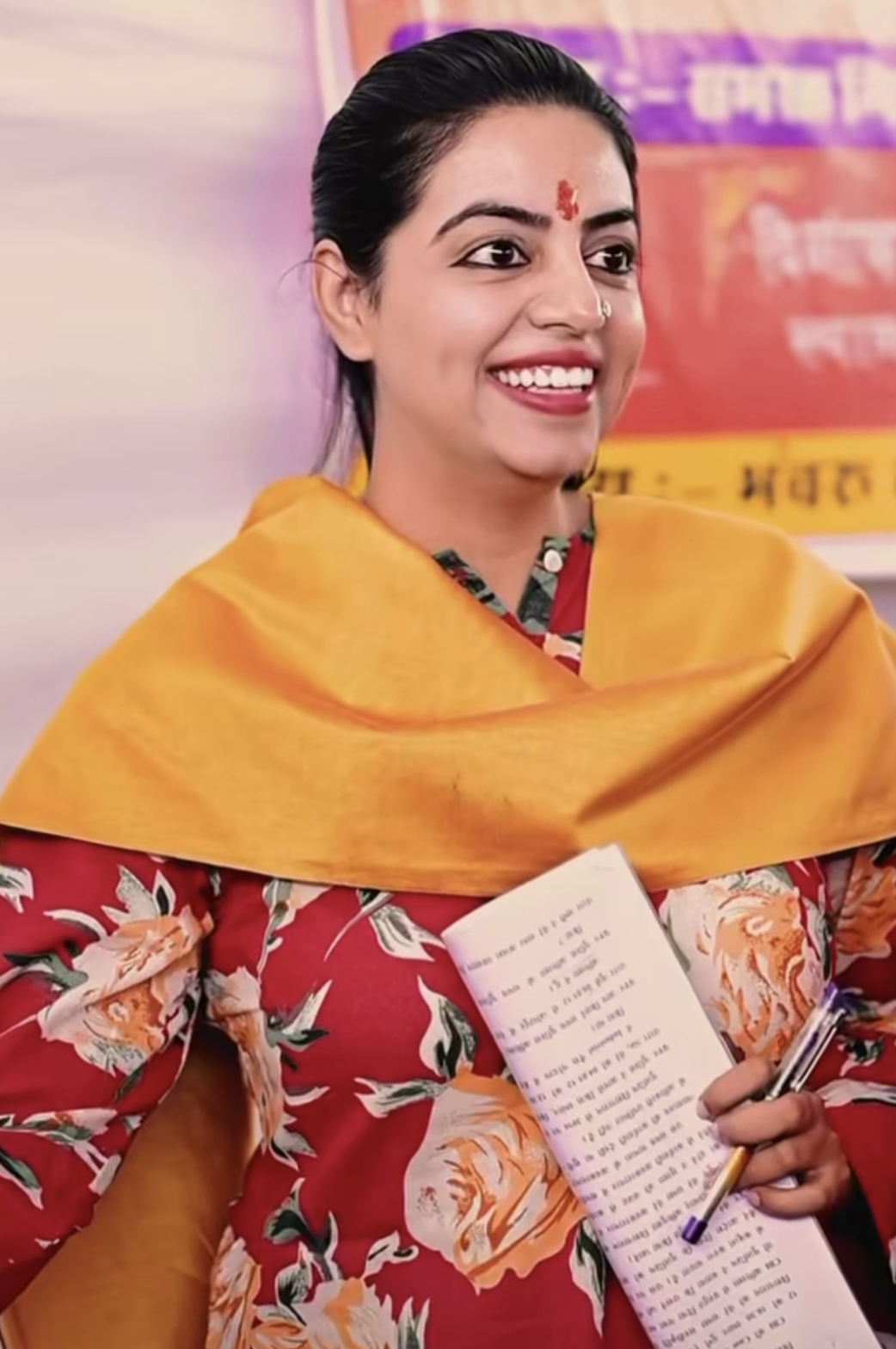

Member of Rajasthan Legislative Assembly
- In office 11 December 2018 – 03 December 2023
- Preceded by: Bhairaram Chaudhary
- Succeeded by: Bhairaram Chaudhary
- Constituency: Osian

Member of District Council Jodhpur
- In office 2010 to 2018
- Constituency: Ward number 11

Personal details
- Born: 25 October 1984 (age 41) Jaipur, India
- Party: Indian National Congress
- Parents: Mahipal Maderna (father); Leela Maderna (mother)
- Relatives: Parasram Maderna (Grandfather)
- Education: B.A. in Economics
- Alma mater: University of Pune
- Occupation: Agriculture

Divya Mahipal Maderna is an Indian politician from Rajasthan. She is a member of the Indian National Congress (INC) and was elected as MLA of the Osian constituency in the 2018 elections.

== Life ==
Maderna is the daughter of government minister Mahipal Maderna and Leela Maderna. Her grandfather Parasram Maderna also worked in politics, serving as a cabinet minister in the Rajasthan Legislative Assembly.

Maderna holds a post-graduate degree in economics from the University of Nottingham, England. In 2010, at the age of 26, she successfully contested the District council polls in Osian, Jodhpur. She contested the Rajasthan legislative assembly elections in 2018 for Osian, Jodhpur on a ticket of the Indian National Congress and won.

She lost in the 2023 Rajasthan Legislative Assembly Election to Bhera Ram Choudhary of the BJP.
