= Jairam Jatav =

Indian politician

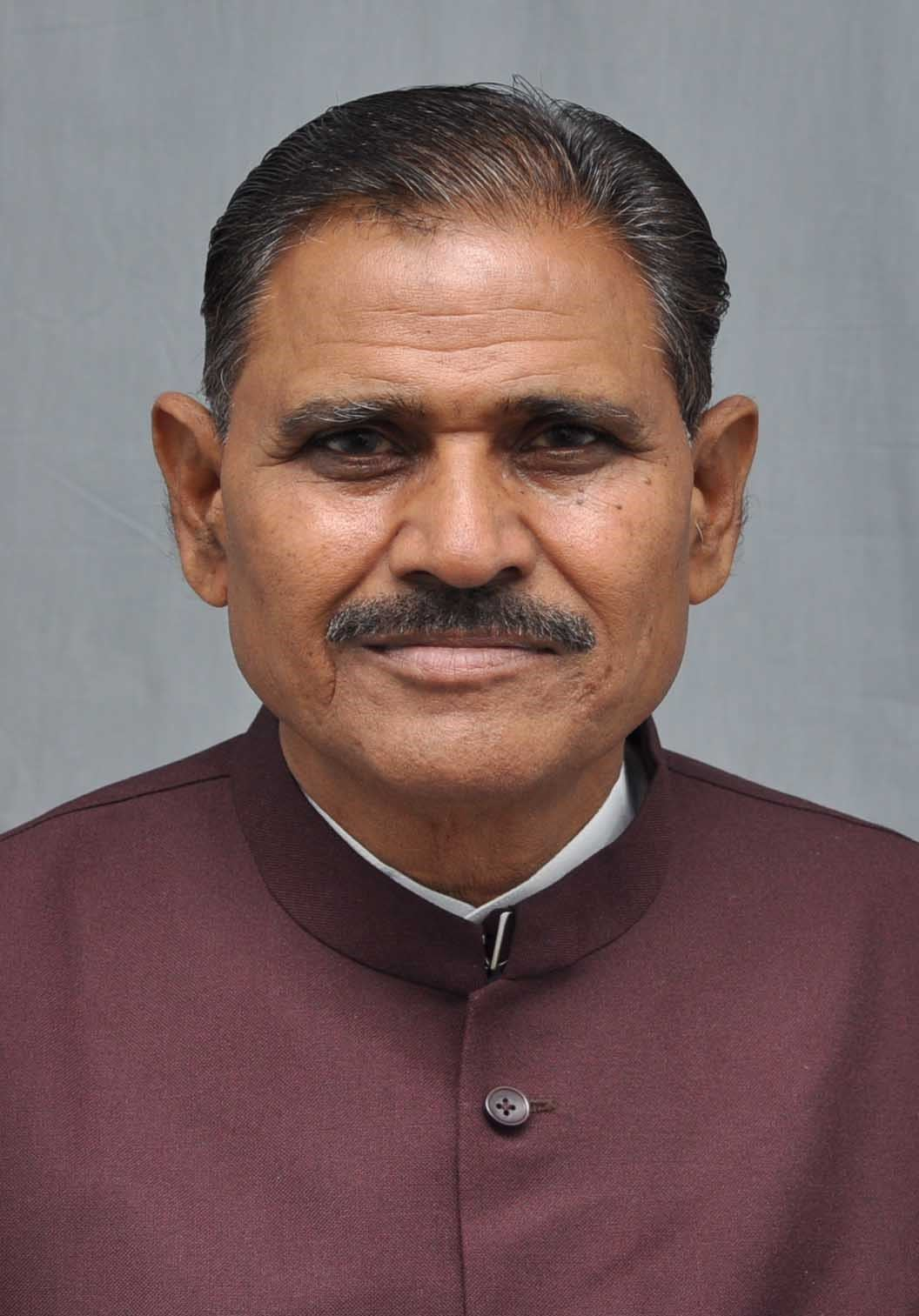

Member of the Rajasthan Legislative Assembly
- In office 2013–2018
- Preceded by: Tika Ram Jully
- Succeeded by: Tika Ram Jully
- Constituency: Alwar Rural

Personal details
- Born: 24 July 1955 (age 70) Ghasoli, Alwar
- Party: Bharatiya Janata Party
- Occupation: Politician

Jairam Jatav is an Indian politician from the Bharatiya Janata Party and a member of the Rajasthan Legislative Assembly representing the Alwar Rural of Rajasthan.
