= Osian Assembly constituency =

Constituency of the Rajasthan legislative assembly in India

Coordinates: 26.73°N 72.90°E

- Constituency No. 125 for the Rajasthan Legislative Assembly
- Location of Osian Assembly constituency in Rajasthan

Constituency details
- Country: India
- Region: North India
- State: Rajasthan
- Division: Jodhpur Division
- District: Jodhpur district
- Lok Sabha constituency: Pali
- Established: 1957
- Reservation: None

Member of Legislative Assembly
- 16th Rajasthan Legislative Assembly
- Incumbent Bhairaram Chaudhary
- Party: Bharatiya Janata Party
- Elected year: 2023
- Preceded by: Divya Maderna

Osian Assembly constituency is one of constituencies of Rajasthan Legislative Assembly in the Pali Lok Sabha constituency. Senior Congress leaders like Paras Ram Maderna, Narendra used contest election from this seat.

== Members of the Legislative Assembly ==
#	Year	Name	Party
1.	1952	Mangal Singh	Independent
2.	1957	Parasram Maderna	Indian National Congress
3.	1962	Parasram Maderna	Indian National Congress
4.	1967	Ranjeet Singh	Indian National Congress
5.	1972	Ranjeet Singh	Indian National Congress
6.	1977	Ranjeet Singh	Indian National Congress
7.	1980	Narendra Singh Bhati	Indian National Congress
8.	1985	Narendra Singh Bhati	Indian National Congress
9.	1990	Ram Narayan Bishnoi	Janata Dal
10.	1993	Narendra Singh Bhati	Indian National Congress
11.	1998	Narendra Singh Bhati	Indian National Congress
12.	2003	Banne Singh	Bharatiya Janata Party
13.	2008	Mahipal Maderna	Indian National Congress
14.	2013	Bhairaram Chaudhary	Bharatiya Janata Party
15.	2018	Divya Maderna	Indian National Congress
16.	2023	Bhairaram Chaudhary	Bharatiya Janata Party

== Election results ==
=== 2023 ===
2023 Rajasthan Legislative Assembly election: Osian
Party	Candidate	Votes	%	±%
BJP	Bhairaram Chaudhary	103,746	49.46	▲19.11
INC	Divya Maderna	100,939	48.12	▲2.83
NOTA	None of the above	1,913	0.91	▼0.1
Majority		2,807	1.34	▼13.6
Turnout		209,762	78.78	▲0.31
BJP gain from INC		Swing		

=== 2018 ===
2018 Rajasthan Legislative Assembly election: Osian
Party	Candidate	Votes	%	±%
INC	Divya Maderna	83,629	45.29	
BJP	Bhairaram Chaudhary	56,039	30.35	
Independent	Mahendrasingh Bhati	37,746	20.44	
BSP	Jyotika	3,054	1.65	
Independent	Vishek Vishnoi	2,312	1.25	
NOTA	None of the above	1,862	1.01	
Majority		27,590	14.94	
Turnout		184,642	78.47	
INC gain from BJP		Swing		

=== 2013 ===
2013 Rajasthan Legislative Assembly election: Osian
Party	Candidate	Votes	%	±%
BJP	Bhairaram Chaudhary	75,363	50.08	
INC	Leela Maderna	59,967	39.85	
BSP	Umrao Singh	4,524	3.01	
Independent	Mehramaram	2,918	1.94	
Jago Party	Arjunram	2,159	1.43	
Independent	Mrigendra Singh	1,375	0.91	
NPP	Rampal Bhawad	945	0.63	
Independent	Bhoma Ram	642	0.43	
NOTA	None of the above	2,597	1.73	
Majority		15,396	10.23	+7.42
Turnout		1,50,490	75.08	+8.88
BJP gain from INC		Swing		

=== 2008 ===
2008 Rajasthan Legislative Assembly election: Osian
Party	Candidate	Votes	%	±%
INC	Mahipal Maderna	37,212	30.75	
Independent	Shambu Singh	33,814	27.94	
BJP	Narayan Ram Bera	25,837	21.35	
BSP	Chandra Prakash Deora	18,315	15.14	
IJP	Chhotu Ram Siyota	1,811	1.50	
Independent	Mahesh	1,172	0.97	
BJSH	Ram Singh Rathore	1,123	0.93	
BRSP	Manoj Chhajer	1,036	0.86	
BBP	Bhanwarlal Meghwal	690	0.57	
Majority		3,398	2.81	−1.43
Turnout		1,21,010	66.2	+7.59
INC gain from BJP		Swing		

=== 2003 ===
2003 Rajasthan Legislative Assembly election: Osian
Party	Candidate	Votes	%	±%
BJP	Banne Singh	47,414	46.54	
INC	Narendra Singh Bhati	43,100	42.30	−8.72
BSP	Sharavan Kumar	5,895	5.79	
SP	Gopal Singh Bhalasaria	2,774	2.72	
INLD	Rajni	2,704	2.65	
Majority		4,314	4.24	−17.54
Turnout		1,01,887	58.61	−0.86
BJP gain from INC		Swing		

=== 1998 ===
1998 Rajasthan Legislative Assembly election: Osian
Party	Candidate	Votes	%	±%
INC	Narendra Singh Bhati	43,947	51.02	−6.76
BJP	Raghvendra Pratap Singh	25,189	29.24	
Independent	Mohan Lal Bishnoi	9,257	10.75	
Independent	Ranjeet Singh	7,750	9.00	
Majority		18,758	21.78	+1.83
Turnout		86,143	59.47	+1.06
INC hold		Swing		

=== 1993 ===
1993 Rajasthan Legislative Assembly election: Osian
Party	Candidate	Votes	%	±%
INC	Narendra Singh Bhati	45,056	57.78	+9.06
BJP	Ram Narayan Bishnoi	29,499	37.83	−11.01
JD	Hari Ram	815	1.05	
Doordarshi Party	Madhuram Devda	561	0.72	
Independent	Mo. Harun	447	0.57	
Independent	Chetan Lal	349	0.45	
Independent	Dhanraj Sharma	317	0.41	−0.41
Socialist Party (Lohia)	Netha Laxminarayan	287	0.37	
Independent	Ragunath Singh Chouhan	232	0.30	
Independent	Jayanti Datt	210	0.27	
Independent	Munna Ram Meghwal	99	0.13	
Independent	Kanwar Lal	84	0.11	
Independent	Abdul Nisar	27	0.03	
Majority		15,557	19.95	+19.83
Turnout		77,983	58.41	+3.48
INC gain from JD		Swing		

=== 1990 ===
1990 Rajasthan Legislative Assembly election: Osian
Party	Candidate	Votes	%	±%
JD	Ram Narayan Bishnoi	32,484	48.84	
INC	Narendra Singh Bhati	32,405	48.72	−18.40
Independent	Dhan Raj	546	0.82	
Doordarshi Party	Charna Ram	536	0.81	
Independent	Ghevar Ram	193	0.29	
Independent	Mahavir Singh	181	0.27	
Independent	Jagdish	97	0.15	
Independent	Surender Dan	72	0.11	
Majority		79	0.12	−36.72
Turnout		66,514	54.93	−3.17
JD gain from INC		Swing		

=== 1985 ===
1985 Rajasthan Legislative Assembly election: Osian
Party	Candidate	Votes	%	±%
INC	Narendra Singh Bhati	37,128	67.12	+23.60
Independent	Ranjit Singh	16,750	30.28	
LKD	Jagdish Singh Parmar	838	1.51	
Independent	Madu Ram Devra	533	0.96	
Independent	Ladhu Ram Bishnoi	67	0.12	
Majority		20,378	36.84	+19.29
Turnout		55,316	58.10	−0.1
INC hold		Swing		

=== 1980 ===
1980 Rajasthan Legislative Assembly election: Osian
Party	Candidate	Votes	%	±%
INC(I)	Narendra Singh Bhati	20,629	43.52	
INC(U)	Badan Singh Choudhary	12,313	25.97	
JP	Baney Singh Rathore	8,766	18.49	−28.49
Independent	Madanlal	2,997	6.32	
JP(S)	Shivnath	1,177	2.48	
Independent	Gajendra Singh Kachhwaha	585	1.23	
Independent	Sajan Ram Dogiyal	350	0.74	
Independent	Kishandan Charan	203	0.43	
Independent	Girdharilal Daga	165	0.35	
Independent	Budharam	118	0.25	
Independent	Kanwarlal	101	0.21	
Majority		8,316	17.55	+14.2
Turnout		47,406	58.20	−0.24
INC hold		Swing		

=== 1977 ===
1977 Rajasthan Legislative Assembly election: Osian
Party	Candidate	Votes	%	±%
INC	Ranjeet Singh	20,141	50.33	−24.29
JP	Banney Singh	18,800	46.98	
Independent	Ridmal Ram	837	2.09	
Independent	Rewat Dan	236	0.59	
Majority		1,341	3.35	−50.45
Turnout		40,014	58.44	+1.58
INC hold		Swing		

=== 1972 ===
1972 Rajasthan Legislative Assembly election: Osian
Party	Candidate	Votes	%	±%
INC	Ranjeet Singh	31,679	74.62	+18.69
SWA	Ratan Singh	8,838	20.82	
Independent	Bhanvar Lal	1,935	4.56	
Majority		22,841	53.80	+38.12
Turnout		42,452	56.86	−2.08
INC hold		Swing		

=== 1967 ===
1967 Rajasthan Legislative Assembly election: Osian
Party	Candidate	Votes	%	±%
INC	Ranjeet Singh	20,236	55.93	
SWA	J. Singh	14,562	40.25	
PSP	Rewat Dan	1,385	3.83	−30.06
Majority		5,674	15.68	−7.21
Turnout		36,183	58.94	+1.22
INC hold		Swing		

=== 1962 ===
1962 Rajasthan Legislative Assembly election: Osian
Party	Candidate	Votes	%	±%
INC	Parasram Maderna	17,964	56.78	−8.01
PSP	Rewat Dan	10,721	33.89	−1.32
Independent	Karna	2,951	9.33	
Majority		7,243	22.89	−6.69
Turnout		31636	57.72	+13.63
INC hold		Swing		

=== 1957 ===
1957 Rajasthan Legislative Assembly election: Osian
Party	Candidate	Votes	%	±%
INC	Parasram Maderna	15,303	64.79	+32.57
PSP	Rewat Dan	8,317	35.21	+29.1
Majority		6,986	29.58	+0.14
Turnout		23,620	44.09	−7.37
INC gain from Independent		Swing		

=== 1952 ===
1952 Rajasthan Legislative Assembly election: Jodhpur Tehsil North
Party	Candidate	Votes	%	±%
Independent	Mangal Singh	19,419	61.66	
INC	Parasram Maderna	10,148	32.22	
Socialist	Rewat Dan	1,925	6.11	
Majority		9,271	29.44	
Turnout		31,492	51.46	
Independent win (new seat)				

== See also ==
- Member of the Legislative Assembly (India)
