= Tika Ram Jully =

Indian politician

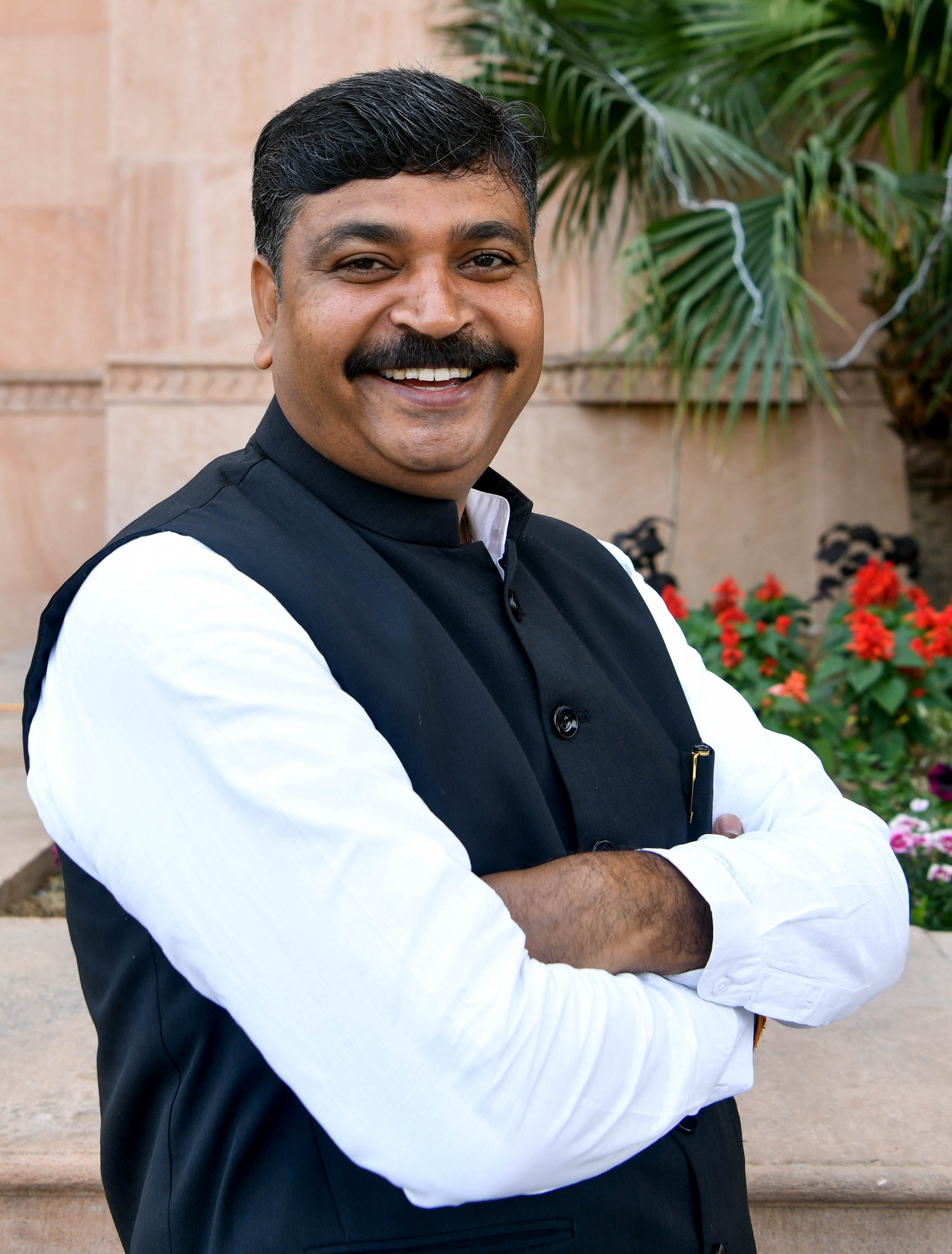
- Jully in 2023

14th Leader of the Opposition, Rajasthan Legislative Assembly
- Incumbent
- Assumed office 19 January 2024
- Deputy: Ramkesh Meena (29 July 2024–present)
- Speaker: Vasudev Devnani
- Chief Minister: Bhajan Sharma
- Preceded by: Rajendra Singh Rathore

Cabinet Minister, Government of Rajasthan
- In office 21 November 2021 – 3 December 2023
- Governor: Kalraj Mishra
- Chief Minister: Ashok Gahlot
- Ministry and Departments: List: * Social Justice & Empowerment; Social Justice & Empowerment under Panchayati Raj; Jail
- Preceded by: Bhanwarlal Meghwal
- Succeeded by: Avinash Gehlot

Minister of State, Government of Rajasthan
- In office 24 December 2018 – 21 November 2021
- Governor: Kalyan Singh; Kalraj Mishra
- Chief Minister: Ashok Gahlot
- Ministry and Departments: List: * Labour (I/C); Factory Boilers Inspection (I/C); Indira Gandhi Canal Project; Co-operative
- Preceded by: Jaswant Singh Yadav
- Succeeded by: Sukhram Bishnoi

Member of the Rajasthan Legislative Assembly
- Incumbent
- Assumed office 11 December 2018
- Preceded by: Jairam Jatav
- In office 2008–2013
- Preceded by: New constituency
- Succeeded by: Jairam Jatav
- Constituency: Alwar Rural

President Of Indian National Congress Alwar
- Incumbent
- Assumed office 11 February 2016

District Head Alwar
- In office 2005–2008

Personal details
- Born: 30 November 1980 (age 45) Kathuwas, Rajasthan, India
- Party: Indian National Congress
- Spouse: Geeta Devi
- Children: 2
- Education: B.A. & L.L.B
- Alma mater: Maharshi Dayanand University & University of Rajasthan
- Occupation: MLA
- Profession: Advocate, Business, Politician
- Website: official website

Tika Ram Jully (born 30 November 1980) is an Indian politician and current 14th Leader of the Opposition in Rajasthan Legislative Assembly since July 2024. He formerly served as Cabinet Minister of Social Justice, Empowerment & Jail Department & Minister of State of Labour Department in the Government of Rajasthan.

== Political career ==
He has been a member of the 13th, 15th, & 16th Rajasthan Legislative Assembly, elected from Alwar Rural constituency. He is a member of Indian National Congress.

== Leader of the Opposition ==
Tika Ram Jully was appointed Congress Legislative Party Leader in Rajasthan Legislative Assembly in January 2024 by AICC.
