= Ram Narayan Bishnoi =

Indian politician

Cabinet Minister Government of Rajasthan
- In office November 1990 – December 1992
- Governor: D. P. Chattopadhyaya; Sarup Singh
- Ministry and departments: Energy; Agriculture

Deputy Speaker of the Rajasthan Legislative Assembly
- In office 19 July 2004 – 10 December 2008

Member of the Rajasthan Legislative Assembly
- In office 1990 - 1992, 1998 – 2008

Personal details
- Born: 1 June 1932 Hanumangarh, Rajasthan, India
- Died: 10 October 2012 (aged 81) New Delhi, India
- Party: Bharatiya Janata Party
- Other political affiliations: Janata Dal
- Education: B.A. LLB
- Alma mater: Dungar College
- Occupation: Politician

Ram Narayan Bishnoi (1 June 1932 – 10 October 2012) was an Indian politician who served as a cabinet minister in the Government of Rajasthan under Bhairon Singh ministry. He was deputy speaker of the Rajasthan Legislative Assembly from 2004 to 2008. He was elected to the Rajasthan Legislative Assembly for first term in 1990 from Osian and then for consecutive two terms in 1998 from Phalodi. He was a member of the Bharatiya Janata Party.
