= Alwar Rural Assembly constituency =

Legislative Assembly constituency in Rajasthan State, India

Coordinates: 27.52°N 76.73°E

Alwar Rural
- Constituency No. 65 for the Rajasthan Legislative Assembly

Constituency details
- Country: India
- Region: North India
- State: Rajasthan
- District: Alwar
- Lok Sabha constituency: Alwar
- Established: 2008
- Total electors: 262,695
- Reservation: SC

Member of Legislative Assembly
- 16th Rajasthan Legislative Assembly
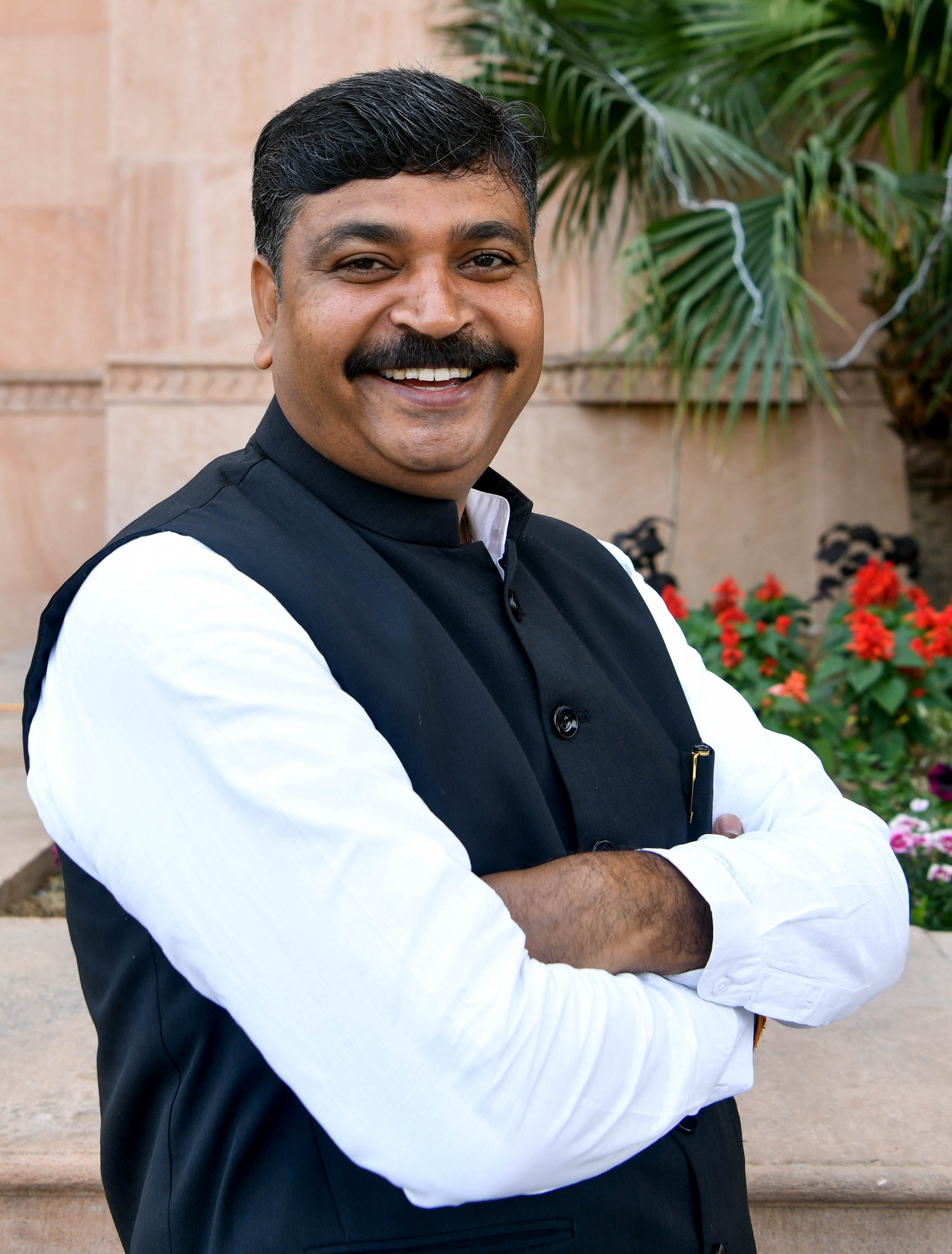
- Incumbent Tika Ram Jully; Leader of the Opposition in Rajasthan Legislative Assembly
- Party: Indian National Congress
- Elected year: 2023

Alwar Rural Assembly constituency is one of the 200 Legislative Assembly constituencies of Rajasthan state in India.

It is part of Alwar district and is reserved for candidates of the Scheduled Castes. As of 2023, its representative is Tika Ram Jully of the Indian National Congress.

== Members of the Legislative Assembly ==
Year	Member	Party
2008	Tika Ram Jully	Indian National Congress
2013	Jairam Jatav	Bharatiya Janata Party
2018	Tika Ram Jully	Indian National Congress
2023	Tika Ram Jully	Indian National Congress

== Election results ==
=== 2023 ===
2023 Rajasthan Legislative Assembly election: Alwar Rural
Party	Candidate	Votes	%	±%
INC	Tikaram Jully	108,584	55.21	+6.07
BJP	Jairam Jatav	81,251	41.31	+7.34
NOTA	None of the above	1,252	0.64	−0.07
Majority		27,333	13.9	−1.27
Turnout		196,680	74.87	−0.84
INC hold		Swing		

=== 2018 ===
Rajasthan Legislative Assembly Election, 2018: Alwar Rural
Party	Candidate	Votes	%	±%
INC	Tikaram Jully	85,752	49.14	
BJP	Master Ramkishan	59,275	33.97	
BSP	Rinky Verma	25,379	14.54	
NOTA	None of the above	1,236	0.71	
Majority		26,477	15.17	
Turnout		174,506	75.71	
INC gain from BJP		Swing		

== See also ==
- List of constituencies of the Rajasthan Legislative Assembly
- Alwar district
