= Chadi, Rajasthan =

Chadi
- Village
- Nickname: Laxman Nagar
- Location in Rajasthan, India Chadi (India)
- Coordinates: 27°08′29″N 73°03′18″E
- Country: India
- State: Rajasthan
- District: Jodhpur

Languages
  - Official: Hindi, Marwari
- Time zone: UTC+5:30 (IST)
- PIN: 342802

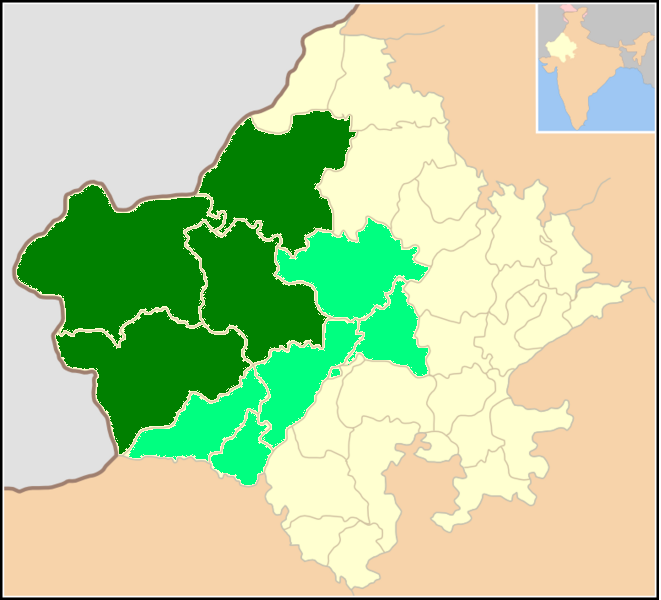
Dark green indicates Marwari speaking home area in Rajasthan, light green indicates additional dialect areas where speakers identify their language as Marwari.

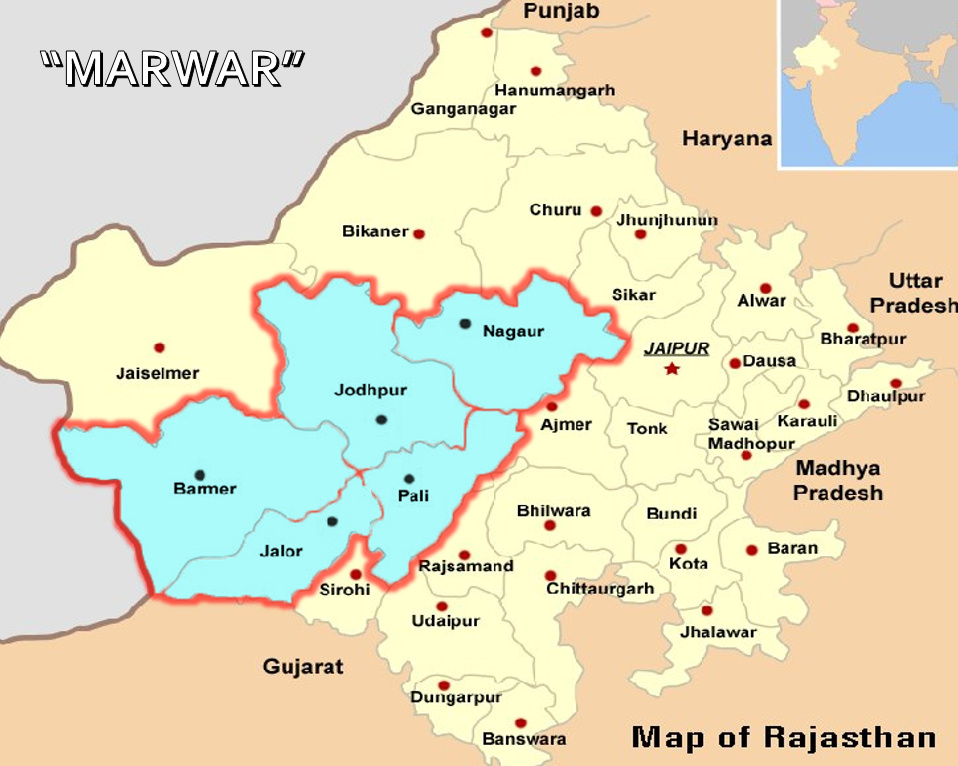
Marwar region of Rajasthan

Chadi also known as Lakshman Nagar is a village in Phalodi tehsil of Jodhpur district in Rajasthan, India. It contain a vast area in the Marwar region. It has a variety of flora and fauna like desert deer, black buck deer and trees and bushes like khejdi and other desert plants.

Some new zamindars were old rajas.

== Area ==
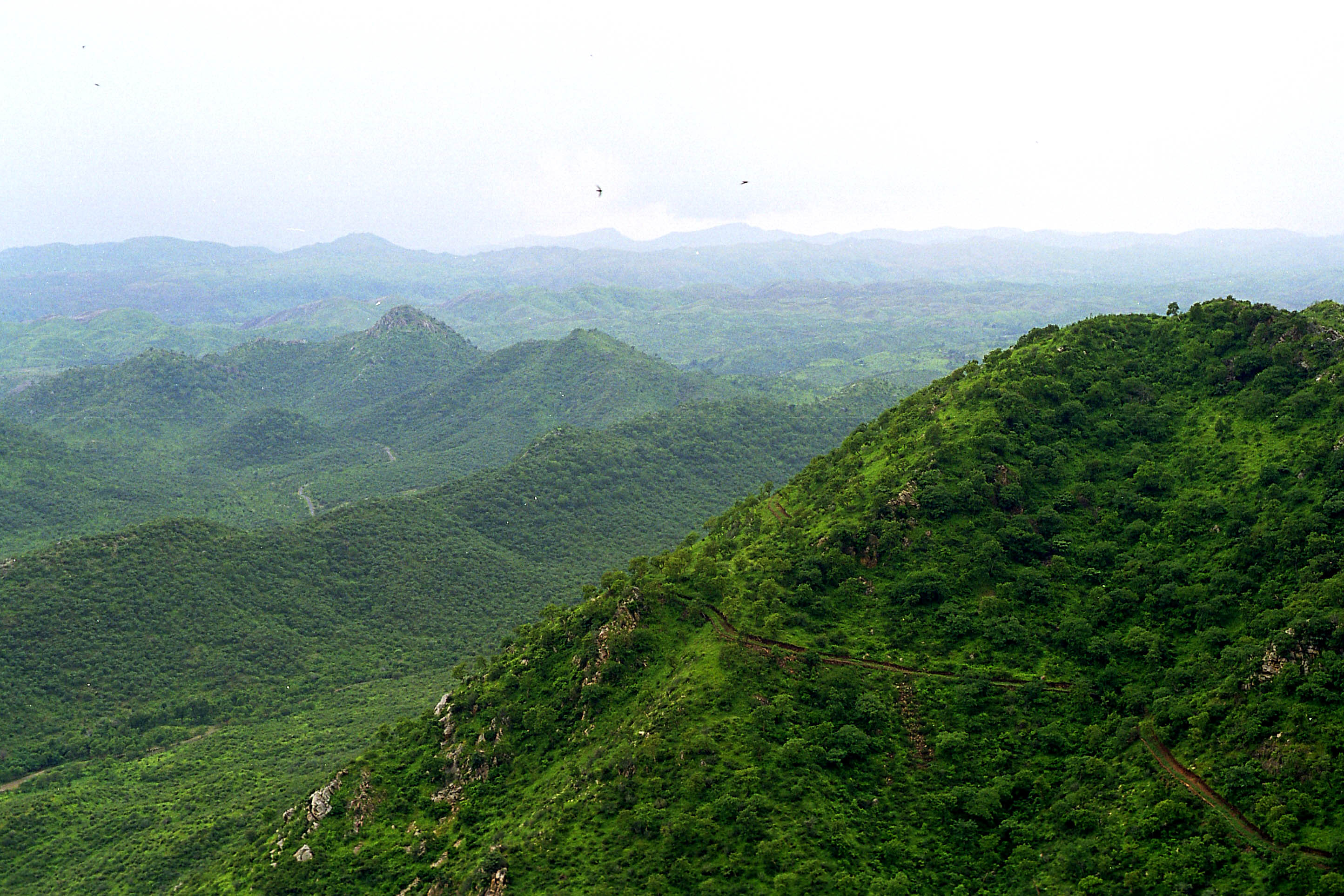
The Aravalli Range adds diversity to the landscape of Rajasthan.

It is in the Western Rajasthan of India. The district is bounded by Nagaur district.

Chadi is a village in Aau Mandal in phalodi District in Rajasthan State in India. Chadi is 96.24 km distance from its District main city Jodhpur and 273 km distance from its State main city Jaipur. Nearby villages are Ridmalsar (4.4 km), Poonasar (7.5 km), Ishru (11. km), Champasar (13. km), Jakhan (14. km), Bapini (17. km), Jaisala (21. km).

Chadi Pin Code is 342312. Other villages in 342312 are Jakhan, Laxman Nagar, Ridmalsar, Raimalwara, Khindakore Sutharo ki dhani laxman nagar ramdev pura (3.km)

== Government and commercial buildings ==
=== Schools near by Chadi ===
- bhatnadiya
- sri krishan nagar
- Capt BR Bishnoi Bana home to laxaman nagar link road
- govt.sec school chadi
- govt. higher school laxmannagar
- govt. sec. school sutharo ki dhani ramdev pure

== Position in Rajasthan politics ==
Shri Parasram Maderna

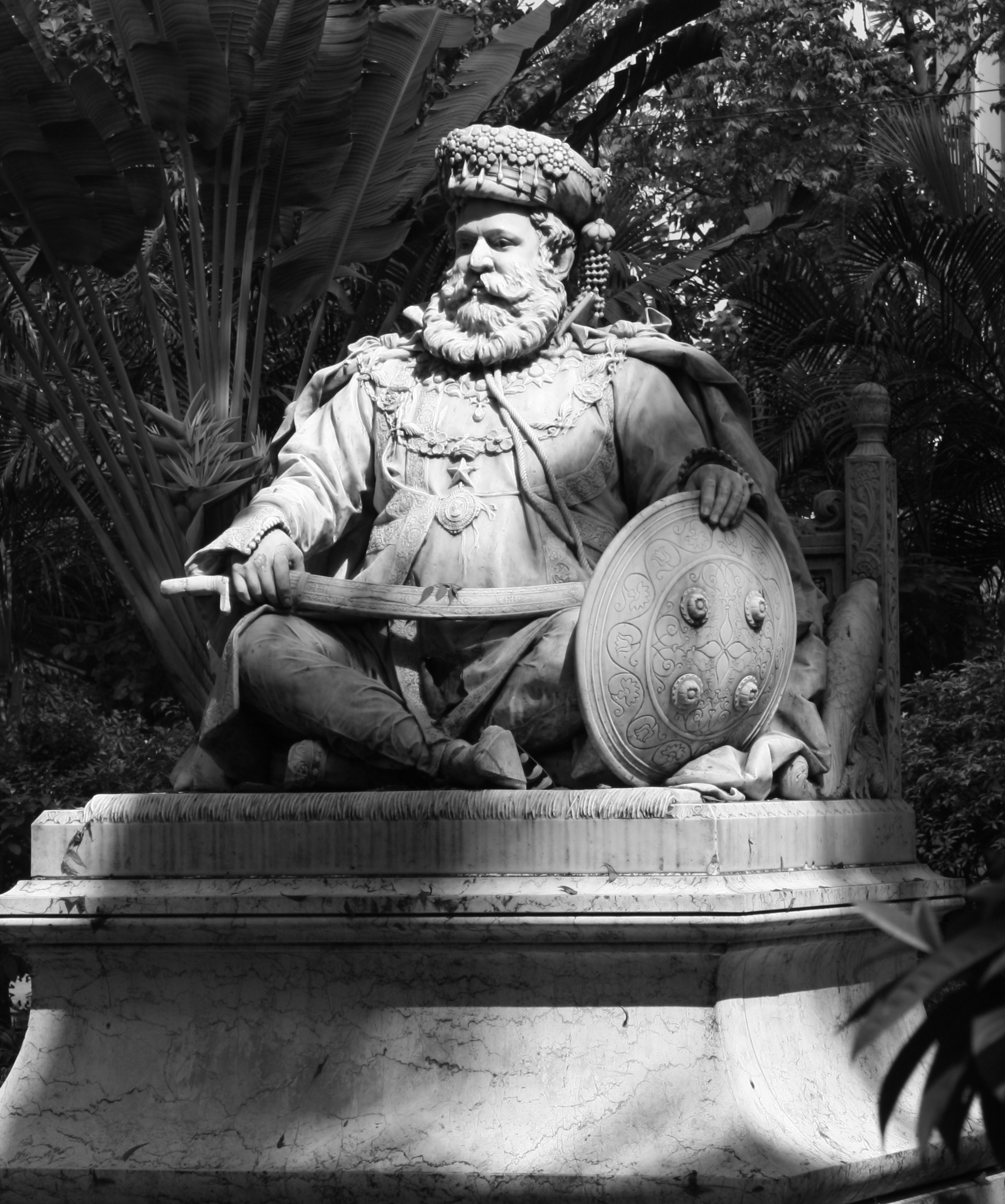
Maharaja Lakshmeshwar Singh, zamindar of Raj Darbhanga

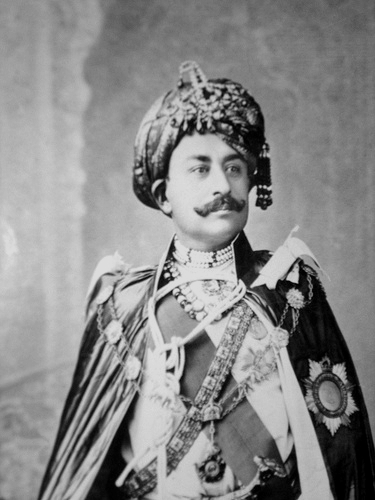
His Highness Maharajadhiraj Mirza Maharao Shri Sir Khengarji III Sawai Bahadur, Rao of Kutch, GCIE, KIH

The royal family has a unique and special palace in Rajasthan politics. They have a continuing place in the ruling of Marwar and not only Marwar, but the whole Rajasthan. The last ruler of lashman nagar, Nathuram ji Maderna was the last landlord of lashman nagar. His son Parasram Maderna had made the Maderna family one of the most top number ranking political family of Rajasthan.

Membership of Legislature

- 1957 - 1962 - Member, Second Rajasthan Legislative Assembly
- 1962 - 1967 - Member, Third Rajasthan Legislative Assembly
- 1967 - 1972 - Member, Fourth Rajasthan Legislative Assembly
- 1972 - 1977 - Member, Fifth Rajasthan Legislative Assembly
- 1977 - 1980 - Member, Sixth Rajasthan Legislative Assembly
- 1980 - 1985 - Member, Seventh Rajasthan Legislative Assembly
- 1990 - 1992 - Member, Ninth Rajasthan Legislative Assembly
- 1993 - 1998 - Member, Tenth Rajasthan Legislative Assembly
- 1998 - 2003 - Member, Eleventh Rajasthan Legislative Assembly

Positions held

- 1953 - 1956 - Sarpanch, Village - Chadi, District -Jodhpur
- 1957 - 1962 - Member of PAC and Estimates Committee
- 1961 - 1962 -
- 1987 - 1990 - Chairman, Central Cooperative Bank Ltd, Jodhpur
- 1962 - 1966 - Dy. Minister, Deptt of General Administration
- 1966 - 1977 - Minister Deptt of GAD, Revenue, Panchayat Raj, Cooperative, Forest, Colonization, Rehabilitation, Flood, Famine, Agriculture, Animal Husbandry, Community Development, Local Bodies and Sheep & Wool, Government of Rajasthan
- 1974 - 1977 - Dy. Leader of INC Party in the Assembly
- 1977 - 1978,
- Feb'1979 - Aug'1979, and 1993–1998, Leader of Opposition, Rajasthan Legislative Assembly
- 1980 - 1981 - Chairman, Committee on Subordinate Legislation
- 1981 - 1982 - Minister, Deptt of Irrigation, PHED, Revenue, Land Reforms, Energy, and Flood & Famine, Government of Rajasthan
- 1981 - 1985 - Member, Syndicate, Jodhpur University
- 1982 - 1985 - Minister, Deptt of Irrigation, PHED, and Ground Water, Govt of Rajasthan
- 1990 - 1992 - Chairman, Public Accounts Committee
- 1994 - 1998 - Chairman, Public Undertakings Committee
- 6 Jan 1999 to 15 Jan 2004 Speaker, Rajasthan Legislative

He ruled this area for 50 long years and now his two sons are taking over his heritage.

== Flora and fauna ==
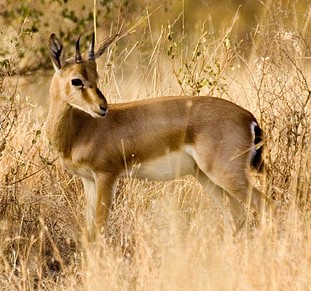
Chinkara

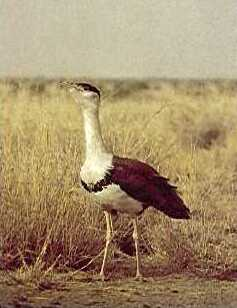
Great Indian bustard

Much of this area is harsh and come in marwar region which means land of dryness and death. The domestic animal are cow speed and camels but horses make a very important role in every day living because horses of this area are strong and known as marwari horses which means living being of marwar.

The area also contains black buck and chinkara deer, rare wild desert fox and Indian wild neeligay (Indian deer). Hunting of black buck and chikara was a very popular sport played by the royal zamindar family.

== Marwari horses ==
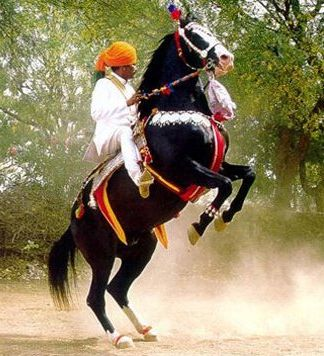
Marwari horse in Rajasthan

Traditional rulers of the Marwar region of western India, were the first to breed the Marwari. Beginning in the 12th century, they espoused strict breeding that promoted purity and hardiness. Used throughout history as a cavalry horse by the people of the Marwar region, the Marwari was noted for its loyalty and bravery in battle. The breed deteriorated in the 1930s, when poor management practices resulted in a reduction of the breeding stock, but today has regained some of its popularity.

The rulers of Marwar and the Rajput cavalry were the traditional breeders of the Marwari. The Rathores were forced from their Kingdom of Kanauj in 1193, and withdrew into the Great Indian and Thar Deserts. The Marwari was vital to their survival, and during the 12th century they followed strict selective breeding processes, keeping the finest stallions for the use of their subjects.
