= Bari Brahmana =

City in Jammu and Kashmir, India

Bari Brahmana BD Bari, Brahmana Di Bari
- City
- Bari Brahmana
- Location in Jammu and Kashmir, India Bari Brahmana (India)
- Coordinates: 32°38′41″N 74°54′22″E
- Country: India
- State: Jammu and Kashmir
- District: Samba

Government
  - Type: Municipal Committee
  - Body: Bari Brahmana Municipal Committee

Area
  - Total: 22.05 km^{2} (8.51 sq mi)
  - Rank: top 10 in Jammu and Kashmir
- Elevation: 352 m (1,155 ft)

Population (2011)
  - Total: 105,453
  - Rank: top 10 in Jammu and Kashmir
  - Density: 4,782/km^{2} (12,390/sq mi)

Languages
  - Official: Hindi, Dogri
- Time zone: UTC+5:30 (IST)
- Postal code: 181133
- Vehicle registration: JK21
- Website: Official website

Bari Brahmana is a city, tehsil in Samba district just 24km from Samba city and 13km from Jammu City in union territory of Jammu and Kashmir, India it has a largest industrial and manufacturing centres in the Jammu and Kashmir, located along NH-44, known as the Gateway of Vaishno Devi Yatra. The name Bari Brahmana comes from two Dogri words Bari, meaning “open ground” or “garden” and Brahmana, referring to the Brahmin Community. Hence, the name means “the garden of Brahmins.” In addition to this industrial importance, the city has cultural and religious significance, with the Local Raghunath Temple being distinct from the Raghunath temple in Jammu. The area has also developed educationally, with several reputed schools and improving civic infrastructure and one reputed hospital under the Bari Brahmana Municipal Committee.

== Geography ==
Bari Brahmana is located at 32°38′41″N 74°54′22″E. It has an average elevation of 352 metres (1155 feet). The city is just south of Jammu City and is situated on the banks of Devika river basin at a alluvial plains on the foot hills of the Shiwaliks which surround it on the East and North-east.

== Climate ==
The climate of the district being sub tropical zone is hot and dry in summer and cold in winter. The foothills of the mountains are bit cooler than neighbouring areas of Punjab. The monsoon season in July to September. The temperature ranges between 4 degree Celsius and 47 degree Celsius.

== History ==
Bari Brahmana was formerly a small settlement of the Dogra Brahmins who were mostly teachers and astrologers. There was lot of wells but now they all has been lost. With the development of Jammu's infrastructure and its proximity to Jammu city, Bari Brahmana emerged as a leading manufacturing centre of the state.

== Demographics ==
As of 2011 India census, Bari Brahmana had a population of 105,453. Males constitute 54% of the population and females 46%. Bari Brahmana has an average literacy rate of 67%, higher than the national average of ; with 59% of the males and 41% of females literate. 16% of the population is under 6 years of age. The majority population of religion is Hindus, Muslims, Christians and Sikhs

Religion in Bari Brahmana (2011)
1. Hinduism (90.1%)
2. Islam (4.56%)
3. Christianity (3.02%)
4. Sikh (2.28%)

== Languages ==
As of 2011 India Census Bari Brahmana had a population of Language speakers is Dogri, Punjabi, Gojri and Hindi.

Languages in Bari Brahmana (2011)
1. Dogri (84.5%)
2. Punjabi (4.95%)
3. Gojri (4.32%)
4. Hindi (2.72%)
5. Others (3.48%)
