= Gangapur, Rajasthan Assembly constituency =

Legislative Assembly constituency in Rajasthan State, India

Coordinates: 26.48°N 76.73°E

Gangapur
- Constituency No. 90 for the Rajasthan Legislative Assembly

Constituency details
- Country: India
- Region: North India
- State: Rajasthan
- District: Sawai Madhopur
- Lok Sabha constituency: Tonk-Sawai Madhopur
- Established: 2008
- Total electors: 268,610
- Reservation: None

Member of Legislative Assembly
- 16th Rajasthan Legislative Assembly
- Incumbent Ramkesh Meena; Deputy Leader of the Opposition in Rajasthan Legislative Assembly
- Party: Indian National Congress

Gangapur Assembly constituency is one of the 200 Legislative Assembly constituencies of Rajasthan state in India.

It is part of sawai madhopur district.

== Members of the Legislative Assembly ==
Year	Member	Party
2008	Ramkesh Meena	Bahujan Samaj Party
2013	Mansingh Gurjar	Bharatiya Janata Party
2018	Ramkesh Meena	Independent
2023	Ramkesh Meena	Indian National Congress

== Election results ==
=== 2023 ===
2023 Rajasthan Legislative Assembly election: Gangapur
Party	Candidate	Votes	%	±%
INC	Ramkesh Meena	83,457	41.86	+16.84
BJP	Mansingh Gurjar	64,189	32.2	+1.64
Independent	Chhote Lal Saini	29,679	14.89	
ASP(KR)	Mukesh Kumar Bairwa	13,467	6.76	
NOTA	None of the above	507	0.25	−1.12
Majority		19,268	9.66	+3.34
Turnout		199,355	74.22	+6.07
INC gain from Independent		Swing		

=== 2018 ===
2018 Rajasthan Legislative Assembly election: Gangapur
Party	Candidate	Votes	%	±%
Independent	Ramkesh	58,744	36.88	
BJP	Mansingh Gurjar	48,678	30.56	
INC	Rajesh Agarwal	39,861	25.02	
BSP	Ramkhilari Meena	5,295	3.32	
NOTA	None of the above	2,186	1.37	
Majority		10,066	6.32	
Turnout		159,296	68.15	
Independent gain from BJP		Swing		

=== 2013 ===
2013 Rajasthan Legislative Assembly election: Gangapur
Party	Candidate	Votes	%	±%
BJP	Mansingh Gurjar	54,228		
NOTA	None of the Above	1,457		
Majority				
Turnout		140,113	69.91	
Registered electors		200,424		
BJP gain from BSP		Swing		

== See also ==
- List of constituencies of the Rajasthan Legislative Assembly
- Sawai Madhopur district
