= Jaliwada =

Village in Jodhpur

Jaliwara Khurd or Jaliwada Khurd Jhaliwara Jaliwada
- village
- Location in Rajasthan, India Jaliwara Khurd or Jaliwada Khurd (India)
- Coordinates: 26°24′47″N 73°35′58″E
- Country: India
- State: Rajasthan
- District: Jodhpur
- Tehsil: Pipar city

Population (2001)
  - Total: 1,092
- Time zone: UTC+5:30 (IST)
- ISO 3166 code: RJ-IN
- Climate: Dry (Köppen: BSh)
- Lok Sabha constituency: Pali
- Vidhan Sabha constituency: Bilara SC

Jaliwara Khurd or Jaliwada is a village in Rajasthan, India. Administratively, it is under Nanan gram panchayat, Pipar city tehsil, Jodhpur district, Rajastha.

It is 8 km by road northeast of Piparcity on the Jodhpur-Merta road. It is on the left (southeast) bank of the Jojari River, an intermittent stream and tributary of the Luni River.

In 2011, it came into the limelight when the nurse Bhanwari Devi was kidnapped there, leading to a political scandal.

== Demographics ==
In the 2001 census, the village of Jaliwara Khurd had 1,092 inhabitants, with 572 males (52.4%) and 520 females (47.6%), for a gender ratio of 909 females per thousand males.
