= Kamsa Meghwal =

Indian politician

Minister of Tribal Area Development, Government of Rajasthan
- In office 2015–2018

MLA
- In office 2013–2018
- Succeeded by: Pukhraj
- Constituency: Bhopalgarh

Personal details
- Born: 6 October 1968 (age 57) Khariya Mithapur, Bilara
- Party: Bharatiya Janata Party
- Occupation: Politician

Kamsa Meghwal (born 1968) is an Indian politician. She is a member of the Rajasthan Legislative Assembly and a Minister in the Government of Rajasthan.

In 2008, she was elected to the Rajasthan Legislative Assembly from Bhopalgarh constituency on a BJP ticket. She was reelected in 2013.

In December 2016, she was named Minister in charge of Tribal Area Development.

Meghwal is married with 2 sons.
