= Bhairaram Chaudhary =

Indian politician

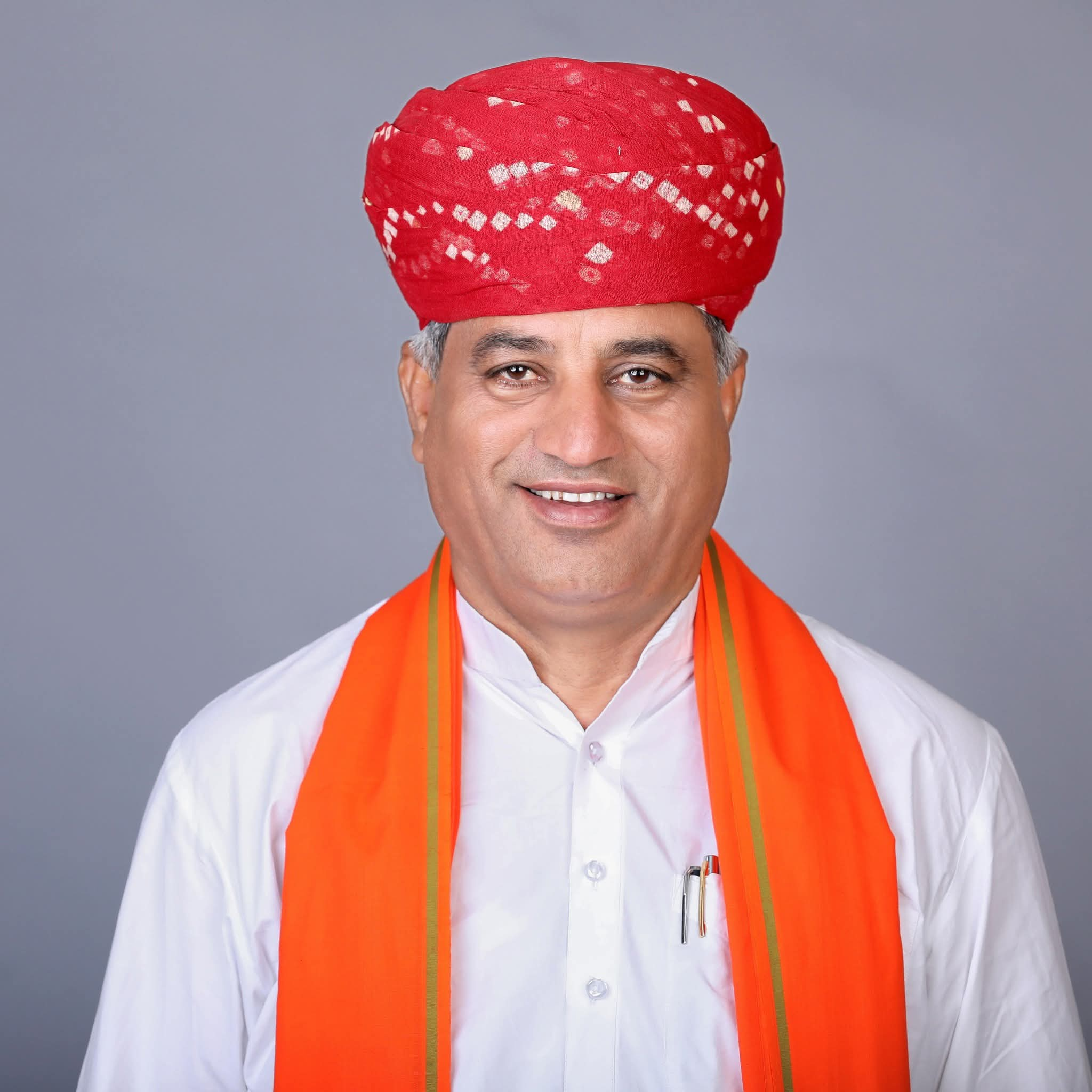

Member of the Rajasthan Legislative Assembly
- In office 2023–Incumbent
- Preceded by: Divya Maderna
- Constituency: Osian

Member of the Rajasthan Legislative Assembly
- In office 2013–2018
- Preceded by: Mahipal Maderna
- Succeeded by: Divya Maderna

Personal details
- Born: Osian, Jodhpur
- Party: Bharatiya Janata Party
- Children: 2
- Occupation: Politician

Bhairaram Chaudhary is an Indian politician from the Bharatiya Janata Party and a former member of the Rajasthan Legislative Assembly. He represented the Osian Vidhan Sabha constituency of Rajasthan.

== Early life ==
Bhairaram Chaudhary was born on 16 June 1971 to a farmer family in a small village of Mandiyai Khurd, Jodhpur. He is the youngest of three boys born to Bhagwanaram Chaudhary and Bagtu Devi.

== Education ==
Bhaira Ram completed B.A. Hons (History) (1991) from Jainarayan Vyas University Jodhpur.
