= Thadiya, Rajasthan =

Thadiya
- Village
- Baba Ramdev Temple
- Coordinates: 26°46′02″N 72°23′10″E
- Country: India
- State: Rajasthan
- District: Jodhpur
- Tehsil: Chamu

Population (2020)
  - Total: 2,929
- Time zone: UTC+5:30 (IST)
- PIN: 342314

Thadiya is a village or Gram Panchayat village in Sekhala tehsil Jodhpur district, Rajasthan, India. In the Thadiya village many government and private schools are available. There are a number of temples such as Guru Jambheshwar Mandir and Baba Ramdev temple. There is a sub-post office. At the time Thadiya is a very developed village in nearly area.

== Nearby places ==
Nathrau 18 Km, Dewatu, Dechu 8 Km, Gilakor, Lorta 8 Km Peelwa and Kanodiya Purohitan etc.
