= Nathrau =

- Village
- Location in Rajasthan, India
- Coordinates: 26°46′29″N 72°19′50″E
- Country: India
- State: Rajasthan
- District: Jodhpur
- Tehsil: Balesar

Population (2011)
  - Total: 1,749
- Time zone: UTC+5:30 (IST)
- PIN: 342309

Nathrau or Nathdau is a village in Jodhpur district of Rajasthan state, India, and is part of the tehsil Balesar. There are many government and private schools in the Nathrau village. This village is without a railway line. Other villages close by include Dewatu, Dechu, Gilakor, Lorta, Peelwa and Thadiya etc.

Nathrau is a land of agriculture belt.
