= Lorta =

- Village
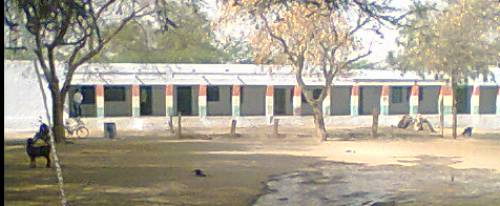

- Location in Rajasthan, India
- Coordinates: 26°46′29″N 72°19′50″E
- Country: India
- State: Rajasthan
- District: Jodhpur
- Tehsil: Balesar
- Official Language: Marwadi
- Time zone: UTC+5:30 (IST)
- PIN: 342309

Lorta is a small village or Gram panchayat village in Balesar Tehsil, Jodhpur district, Rajasthan, India. In Lorta there are many government and private schools.

== Nearby places ==
The nearby villages of Lorta are Nathrau, Dewatu, Dechu, Thadiya, Gilakor etc.
