= National Highway 114 (India, old numbering) =

Old numbering of road in India

National Highway 114

Route information
- Length: 180 km (110 mi)

Major junctions
- From: Jodhpur
- To: Pokhran

Location
- Country: India
- States: Rajasthan: 180 km (110 mi)
- Primary destinations: Shaitrawa - Dechu

Highway system
- Roads in India; Expressways; National; State; Asian
← NH 113	→ NH 116

National Highway 114 (NH 114) starts from Jodhpur and ends at Pokhran, both places in the state of Rajasthan, India. The highway is 180 km (110 mi) long and runs only in the districts of Jodhpur and Jaisalmer in the state of Rajasthan.

== Route ==
National Highway 114 starts from its junction with NH-65 just north of Jodhpur.

- Agolai
- Balesar Satan
- Sekhala
- Shaitrawa (Setrawa)
- Dechu (Dechoo)
- Gumanpura
- Lawan
- Pokhran (Pokaran)

National Highway 114 terminates at its junction with NH-15, just northwest of Pokhran.

== See also ==
- List of national highways in India
- National Highways Development Project
