= List of people from Jodhpur =

Notable people from Jodhpur, India

- Maharaja Hanwant Singh
- Maharaj Prem Singh, Arjuna Award (first for polo)
- Ila Arun, actress and singer
- Rajmata Krishna Kumari, politician
- Maharaja Gaj Singh, politician
- Jai Narayan Vyas, politician
- Chitrangada Singh, actress and model
- Abhishek Singhvi, politician
- Barkatullah Khan, politician
- Justice Kan Singh Parihar, former Judge of the Rajasthan High Court and a former Vice-Chancellor of Jai Narain Vyas University, formerly known as Jodhpur University.
- Justice Chand Mal Lodha
- Justice Rajendra Mal Lodha
- Justice Milap Chand Jain
- Justice Guman Mal Lodha
- Justice Devendra Kachhawaha
- Justice Vijay Bishnoi, Chief Justice of Gauhati High Court
- Laxmi Mall Singhvi, jurist
- Mithali Raj, cricketer
- Ashok Gehlot, former Chief Minister of Rajasthan
- Gajendra Singh Shekhawat, Cultural & Tourism Minister
- Ashwini Vaishnaw, Railway Minister and IT and Communication Minister
- Rao Raja Hanut Singh, British Indian Army soldier and polo player
- Kailash Sankhala, conservationist
- D.R. Mehta, ex-chairman of SEBI
- Man Mohan Sharma, chemical engineer
- Suryakanta Vyas, Member of the Legislative Assembly
- Major Shaitan Singh Bhati PVC, Indian Army officer
- Komal Kothari, ethnomusicologist
- Guru Surendra bahadur singh kushwah, Arya marudhar vyam sala jodhpur
- Karun Nair, cricketer
- Mohammad Faiz, singer
- Achal Das Bohra, engineer
- Chanda Kochhar, managing director and CEO of ICICI Bank
- Sita Ram Lalas, linguist and lexicographer
- Sunil Bohra, film producer
- Shah Bhopal Chand Lodha, former Public Works Secretary
- Shanno Khurana (b. 1927), Hindustani classical singer, awarded Padma Bhushan
- Shailesh Lodha, actor
- Ravi Bishnoi, cricketer
- Abhay Jodhpurkar, singer
- Narayan Singh Manaklao, social worker, Padma Bhushan and Padma Shree awardee

== See also ==
- Rulers of Jodhpur
