= Balesar (disambiguation) =

Balesar may refer to:

- Balesar also Balesar Satan, a village in Rajasthan, India
- Balesar Durgawatan, a smaller village in Rajasthan, India
- Balesar tehsil, an administrative subdivision of Jodhpur District, Rajasthan, India
- Balesar, Karnataka, a small village in Uttar Kannada, Karnataka, India

== See also ==
- Baleswar
