= Gilakor =

- Village
- Location in Rajasthan, India
- Coordinates: 26.7709°N 72.4554°E
- Country: India
- State: Rajasthan
- District: Jodhpur
- Tehsil: Sekhala tehsil

Population (2011)
  - Total: 1,944
- Time zone: UTC+5:30 (IST)
- PIN: 342309

Gilakor (also known as Gilakore) is a village in the Jodhpur district of the Indian state of Rajasthan. This village comes under Sekhala tehsil.

According to the 2011 census of the village, the population is 1944, of which 352 are household. There is also a secondary school in the village. The village pincode is 342309.

The nearby villages of Gilakor are Dechu, Thadiya, Lorta and Nathrau.
