= Barnau, Rajasthan =

Barnau
- Village
- Location in Rajasthan, India
- Coordinates: 26°46′29″N 72°19′50″E
- Country: India
- State: Rajasthan
- District: Jodhpur
- Tehsil: Balesar

Population
  - Total: 1,846
- Time zone: UTC+5:30 (IST)
- PIN: 342309

Barnau is a panchayat village in Balesar tehsil, in the Jodhpur district of the Indian state of Rajasthan. It has a population of 1846, of which 912 are males and 934 female.
