= Sekhala =

- Village
- Location in Rajasthan, India Sekhala (India)
- Coordinates: 26°52′24″N 72°38′44″E
- Country: India
- State: Rajasthan
- District: Jodhpur
- Tehsil: Sekhala tehsil
- Time zone: UTC+05:30 (IST)
- PIN: 342025

Sekhala (also called Shekhala) is a Panchayat samiti in Shergarh tehsil of Jodhpur district in state of Rajasthan.

National highway number 114 passes through Sekhala Panchayat.
