= Belwa =

Village in Jodhpur (Rajasthan), India

- Village
- Location in Rajasthan, India
- Country: India
- State: Rajasthan
- District: Jodhpur
- Tehsil: Balesar tehsil
- Time zone: UTC+5:30 (IST)

Belwa is a village in Jodhpur district of Rajasthan. It is 80 km away from the district headquarter. The village has a population of 4,346.
