= Kanodia =

Kanodia may refer to:

== People ==
- Birendra Kumar Kanodia, Nepalese politician
- Hitu Kanodia (born 1970), Indian film actor
- Lalit Surajmal Kanodia (born 1941), Indian business entrepreneur
- Mahesh Kanodia (1937–2020), Indian singer
- Naresh Kanodia (1943–2020), Indian film actor

== Other uses ==
- Kanodia Purohitan, village in India
