= Barli, Jodhpur =

Barli
- village
- Interactive map of Barli
- Coordinates: 26°18′48″N 72°55′59″E
- Town: India
- State: Rajasthan
- District: Jodhpur
- Tehsil: Balesar
- Elevation: 230 m (750 ft)

Population (2001)
  - Total: 2,248

Languages
- Time zone: UTC+5:30 (IST)
- PIN: 342023
- ISO 3166 code: RJ-IN
- Vehicle registration: RJ-19

Barli is a village in Jodhpur district, Rajasthan, India. It is a panchayat village.

== Population ==
The Barli village has population of 2,248 of which 1,162 are males while 1,086 are females as per Population Census 2011.
