= Gelawas =

- village
- Interactive map of Gelawas
- Coordinates: 25.799°N 72.818°E
- Town: India
- State: Rajasthan
- District: Jodhpur
- Elevation: 230 m (750 ft)

Population (2011)
  - Total: 1,448

Languages
- Time zone: UTC+5:30 (IST)
- ISO 3166 code: RJ-IN
- Vehicle registration: RJ-19

Gelawas is a village in Jodhpur district, Rajasthan, India. It is a panchayat village.
