= Sekhala tehsil =

Sekhala tehsil सेखाला तहसील
- Tehsil
- Sekhala tehsil
- Shekhala Tehsil in Jodhpur Rural district
- Country: India
- State: Rajasthan
- District: Jodhpur
- Headquarters: Sekhala

Sekhala tehsil is a tehsil in Jodhpur District of Rajasthan state in western India. Headquarters for the tehsil is the village of Sekhala.

It borders Balesar tehsil to the east and Shergarh tehsil to the west.

== Villages ==
There are twenty-eight panchayat villages in Sekhala tehsil.

- Sekhala
- Gilakor
- Godelai
- Lorta Achalawata
- Natharau
- Prahaladpura
- Kanodiya Purohitan
- Ketu Kallan
- Ketu Mada
- Chamu
- Dera
- Deriya
- Dewatoo
- Bhaloo Anoopgarh
- Bhaloo Rajwa
- Barnau
