= Sambhali Trust =

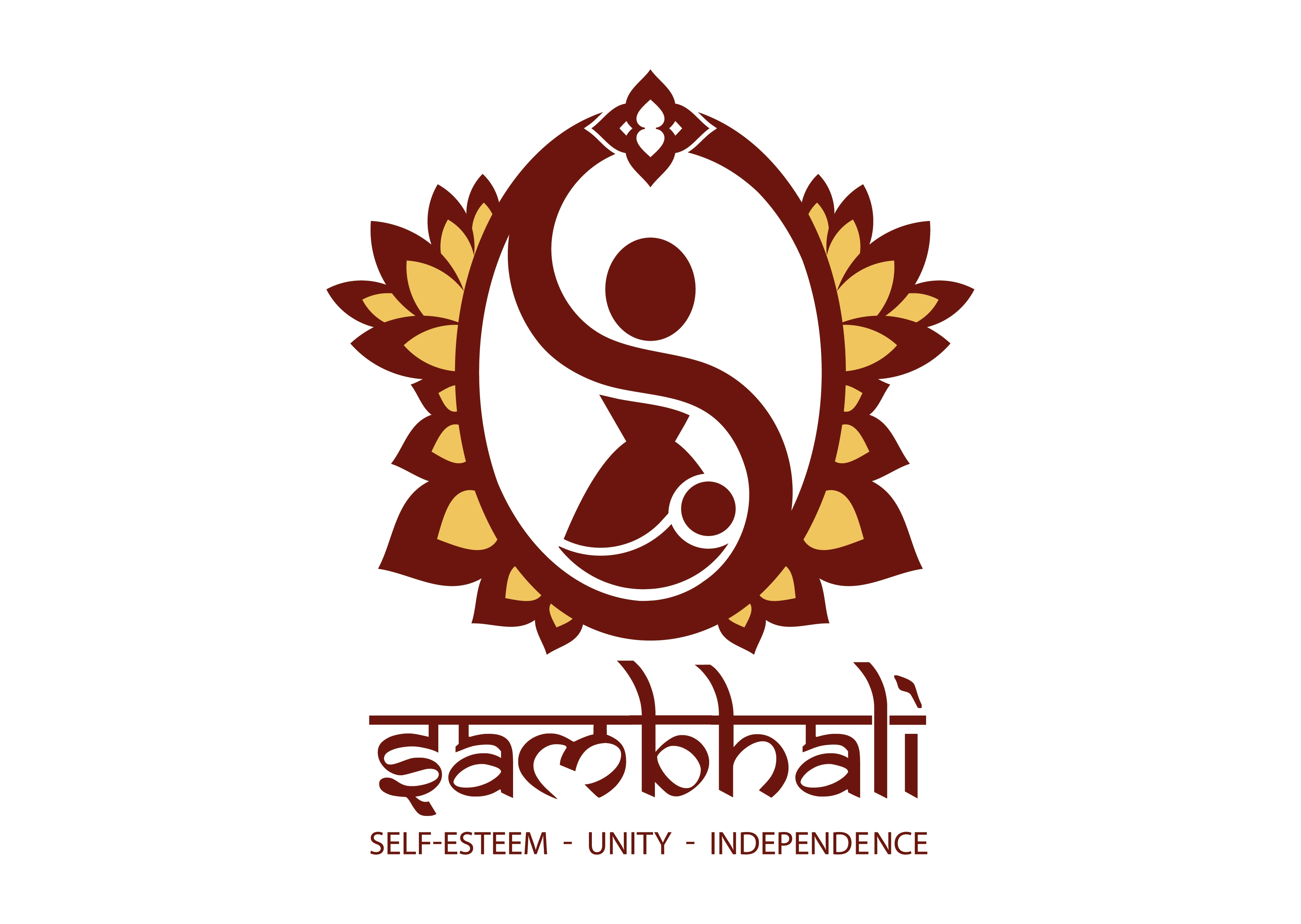
- Founded: 16 January 2007
- Founder: Govind Singh Rathore
- Type: Non-governmental organization
- Location: Jodhpur
- Region served: Rajasthan
- Official language: Hindi and English
- Website: www.sambhali.org

Sambhali Trust is a non governmental organization (NGO) based in Jodhpur, India.

Founded in 2007, Sambhali Trust aims to empower women, girls, children and gender minorities in Rajasthan through education, livelihoods, protection and social inclusion, working without discrimination. Sambhali Trust offers free access to education, vocational training, shelters and social, medical, psychological and legal support. The organization operates in Jodhpur, Jaisalmer and Setrawa and has reached over 95, 000 women, children and gender minorities in Rajasthan since its creation. Partner organizations relay and finance Sambhali Trust actions in five European countries and in the United States.

== Story of Sambhali Trust ==
When he lost his father at almost fifteen years old, Govind Singh Rathore became head of his household and witnessed his widowed mother's status reduced to nothing. Overnight, she became an outcast to her family and community. In the Indian patriarchal society, widows indeed lose their rights and respect regardless of their initial status. Engaged at fifteen and married at twenty, Govind began raising an interest in women's issues in his community, starting with his own maid, Meera. He convinced her to bring him his two unschooled daughters to teach them reading and writing, and she quickly brought more women to his courses. Six month later, on the 16 January 2007, Sambhali Trust was born.

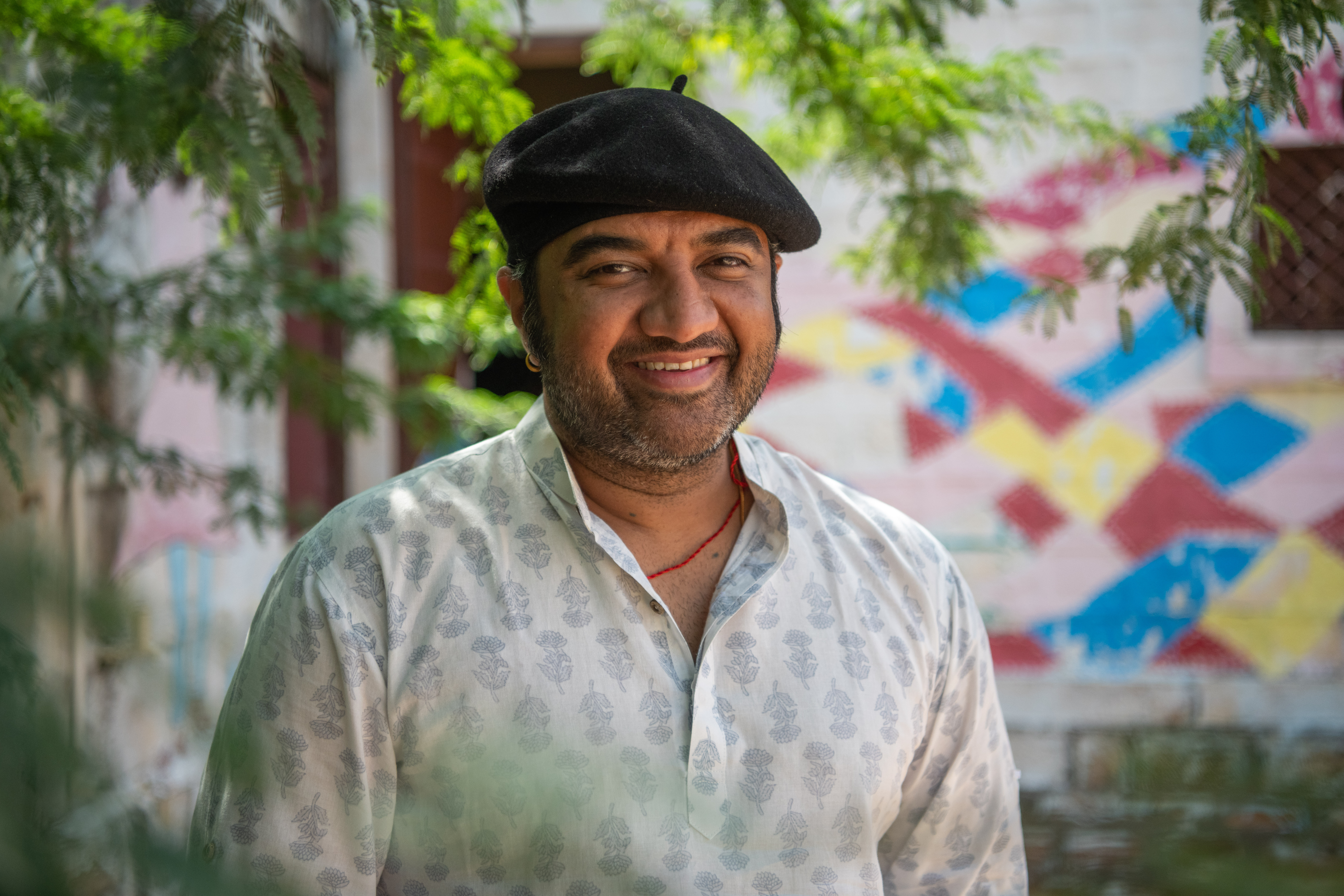
Govind Singh Rathore, Founder and Voluntary Ambassador of Sambhali Trust.

Sambhali, in Hindi, evokes the idea of taking care of something or someone. The prime purpose of Sambhali Trust is to allow women from Rajasthan to access financial independence in order to get out of poverty and reduce classist and sexist discrimination. To do so, the association initially focused on education and hence created a program allowing free access to Hindi, English, math, sewing and embroidery classes for women and children in Jodhpur. Subsequently, Sambhali created empowerment centers in Jodhpur, Jaisalmer and Setrawa. The goal of these centers is to enable women to acquire necessary skills and knowledge to get a job or create their own enterprise. These centers also allow them to meet each other, break out of their isolation and create strong social bonds.

In 2015, Sambhali Trust was granted the Special Consultative Status with the UN Economic and Social Council (ECOSOC), a form of international recognition allowing it to propose documents and attend meetings of this council, which adopts humanitarian resolutions among other things.

In 2020, during the COVID-19 pandemic, Govind Singh Rathore's family and other members of the association went to the ancestral village of Setrawa in the Thar desert to supply food and masks to local populations. The main house and Sambhali buildings in Jodhpur are made available to the authorities to set up quarantine centers.

The Sambhali Development Foundation was created in 2024 to enhance the sustainability of Sambhali Trust and reduce its dependence on external donations. It is a non-profit initiative that creates employment and supports marginalized communities of Rajasthan. The foundation is mainly based on three key projects, the Sambhali Café, the Sambhali Boutique and the Sambhali Walks.

== Projects and Structure ==
Sambhali Trust is based on a variety of programs and action plans :

=== Empowerment centers ===
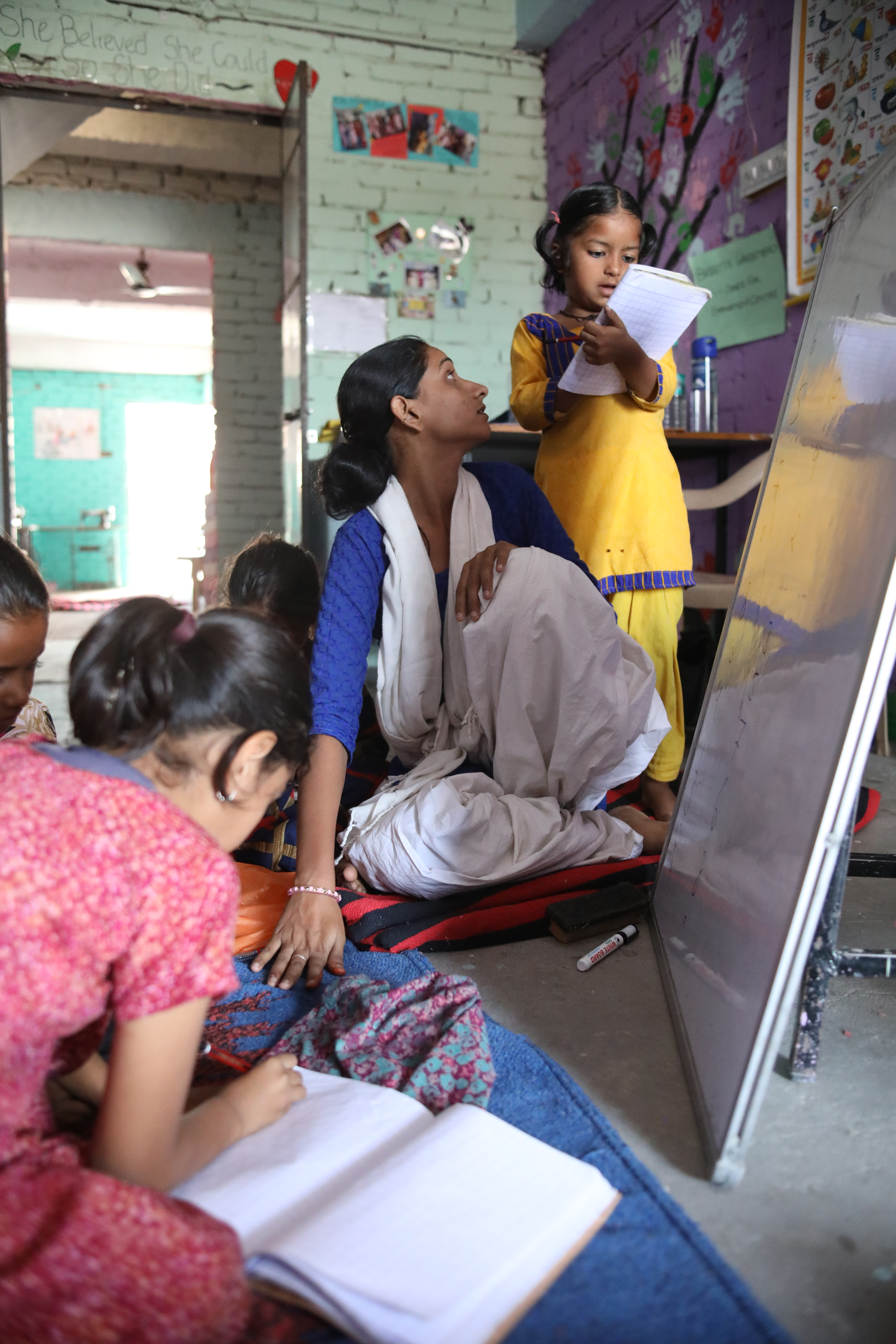
English lesson for girls in an empowerment center.

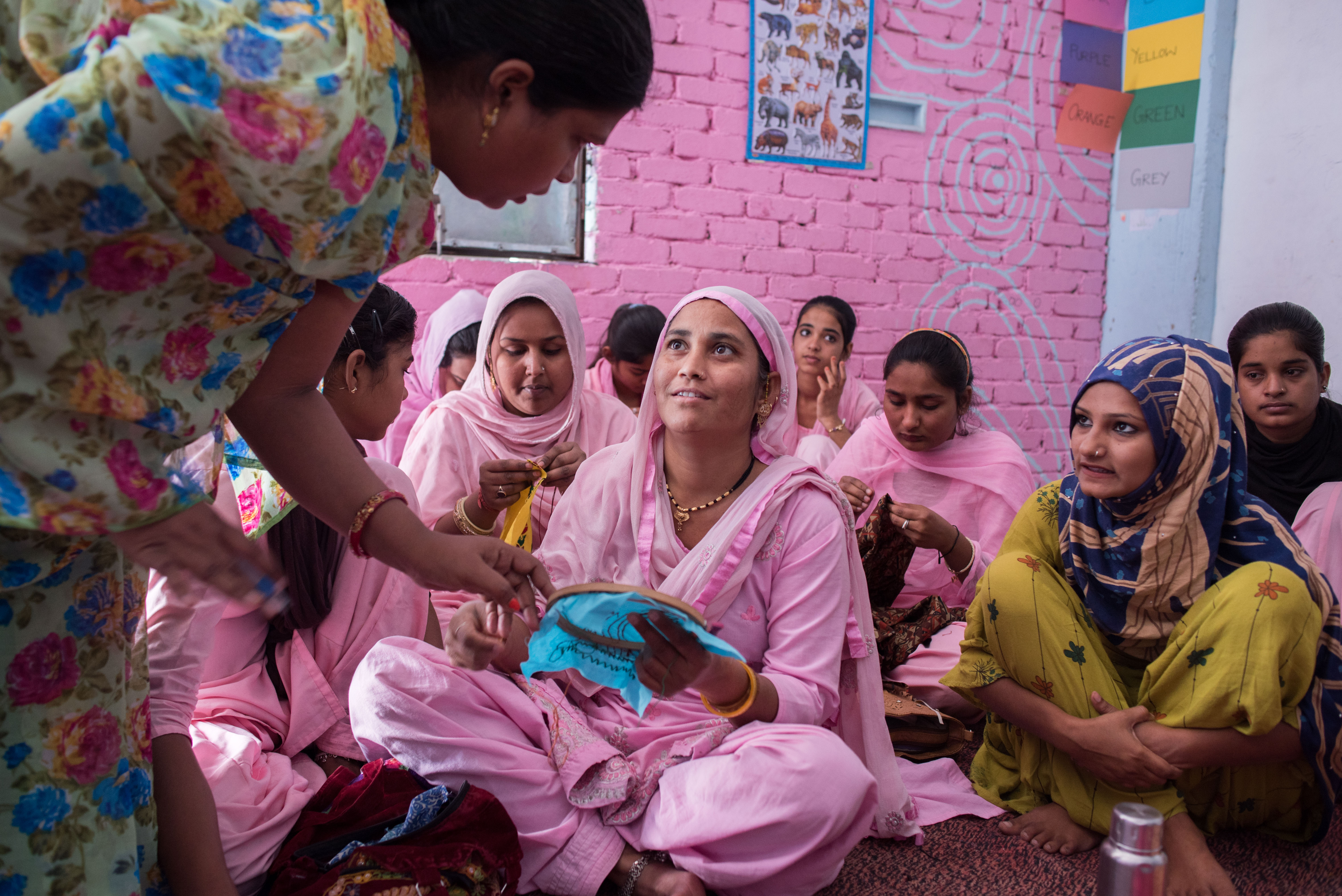
Sewing lesson for women in an empowerment center.

These centers provide underprivileged women and children with the academic and practical education they need to achieve financial independence and break the cycle of poverty. They offer free access to Hindi, English and math courses taught by Indian teachers and international volunteers. The women are also trained in sewing and traditional embroidery, so that they can create their own products to sell later on, and gain financial independence. At the end of an annual program, the women receive a sewing machine so that they can continue to create from home and earn an income. As well as providing access to education, the empowerment centers are also places for women and children who don't always have other places to meet and socialize. The centers are open every Saturday for games, songs and discussions. In addition, they provide physical security thanks to a free medical check-up every month and personalized follow-up for each individual. Last but not least, every week in the centers, workshops are given by the director of each center, in Hindi, on topical subjects necessary for daily life, such as women's health and hygiene, women's rights, Indian politics or harassment. These talks are sometimes given by international volunteers, on subjects in which they are experts. Self-defense courses are also given.

Since its inception, over 6,200 women and children have benefited from this program in Jodhpur, Jaisalmer and Setrawa. There are currently nine empowerment centers in these three cities.

=== Boarding homes ===
The Sambhali boarding homes were set up to enable women and children from rural areas to receive a continuous, daily education from primary school through to higher education, financed by individual scholarship. They also welcome women fleeing abusive homes. Sambhali Trust counts three boarding schools 2025.

The Sambhali Sheerni Boarding Home is the first boarding house founded by Sambhali in May 2012. In April 2017, the Sambhali Laadli Boarding Home was established, and finally the Abhayasthali Boarding Home was built to accommodate women going to university.

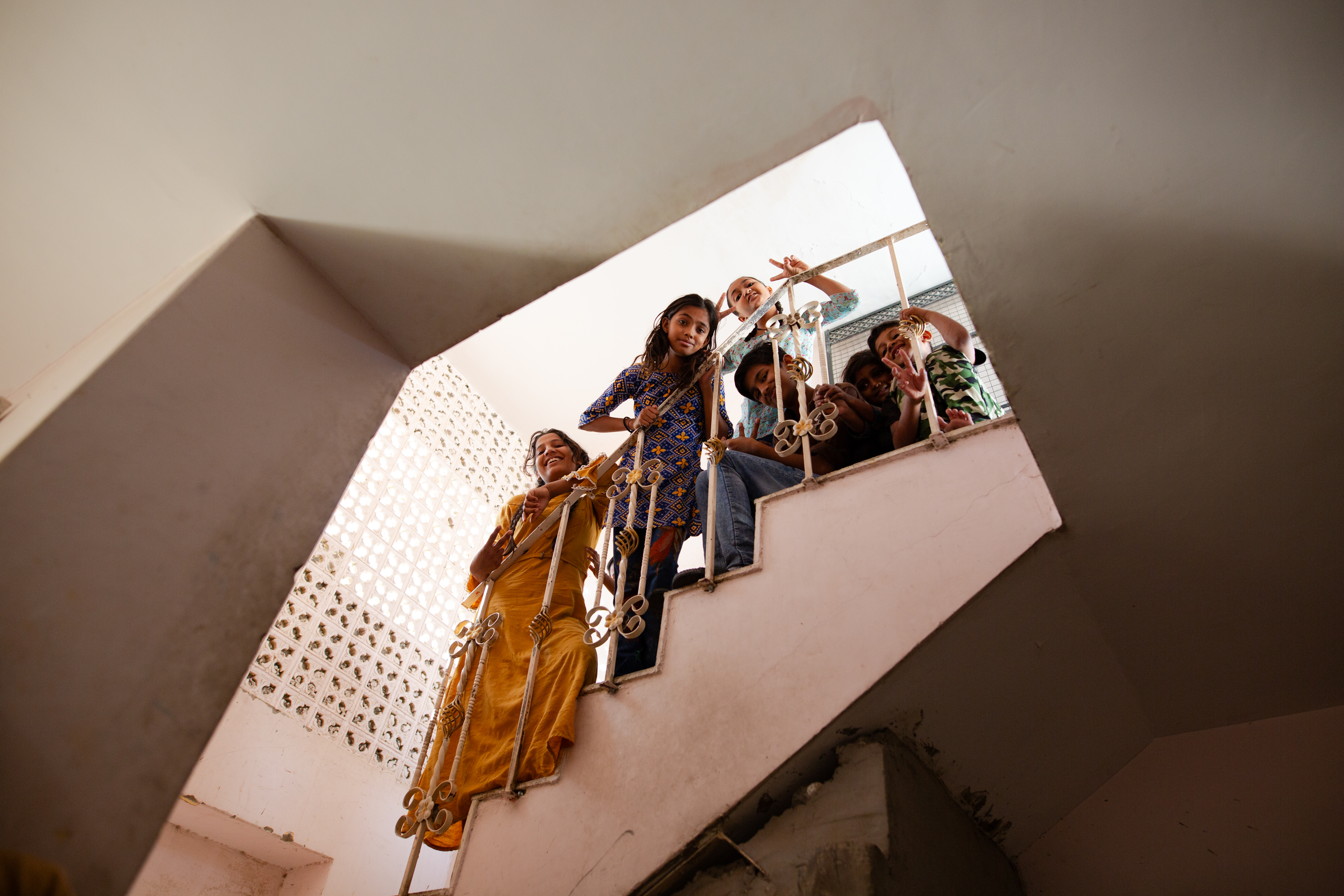
Young women in a boarding home

Each boarding home is cared for by a woman who lives on site, takes care of the meals and accompanies the residents. International volunteers also teach lessons there and organize activities, and a precise and personalized medical follow-up is set up for each intern. Residents are taught daily hygiene routines, and a tutor is responsible for assessing each child's educational level and referring them to different centers or schools. As soon as the youngsters are in good health, up to date with their vaccinations and settled in, they are sent to school, and the tutors then take charge of helping them with their homework and translating between the English-speaking volunteers and the boarders who often only speak Marwari or Hindi.

The boarding schools have welcomed a total of 206 young women and children since 2012, aged from 6 to 18.

=== The scholarship program ===
The program is based on an international sponsorship system. Anyone who so wishes can support a child, finance his or her education and follow his or her schooling from afar. Addressed to children from homes unable to pay their school fees, this program benefits 214 children in 2024/2025, and has helped over 3,400 children since its creation.

=== The microfinance program ===
Created in October 2009, this program enhances women's financial independence by enabling them to set up their own businesses and learn about the economic challenges of textile design. These women receive free training in finance and business, and assistance in obtaining loans and managing their money. In 2024, 80 women are benefiting from this program, which has supported the economic emancipation of 451 women in 15 years. 85% of the women benefiting from this program are Dalits.

=== Nirbhaya project ===
Created in 2014, this program offers a helpline for women in Rajasthan. This assistance also consists of a reception for victims at Sambhali's headquarters in Jodhpur, psychological support and administrative help in the event of potential complaints or separation. In 2024, 7005 women benefited from this program, which has helped more than 21,700 women since its inception.

=== Garima project ===
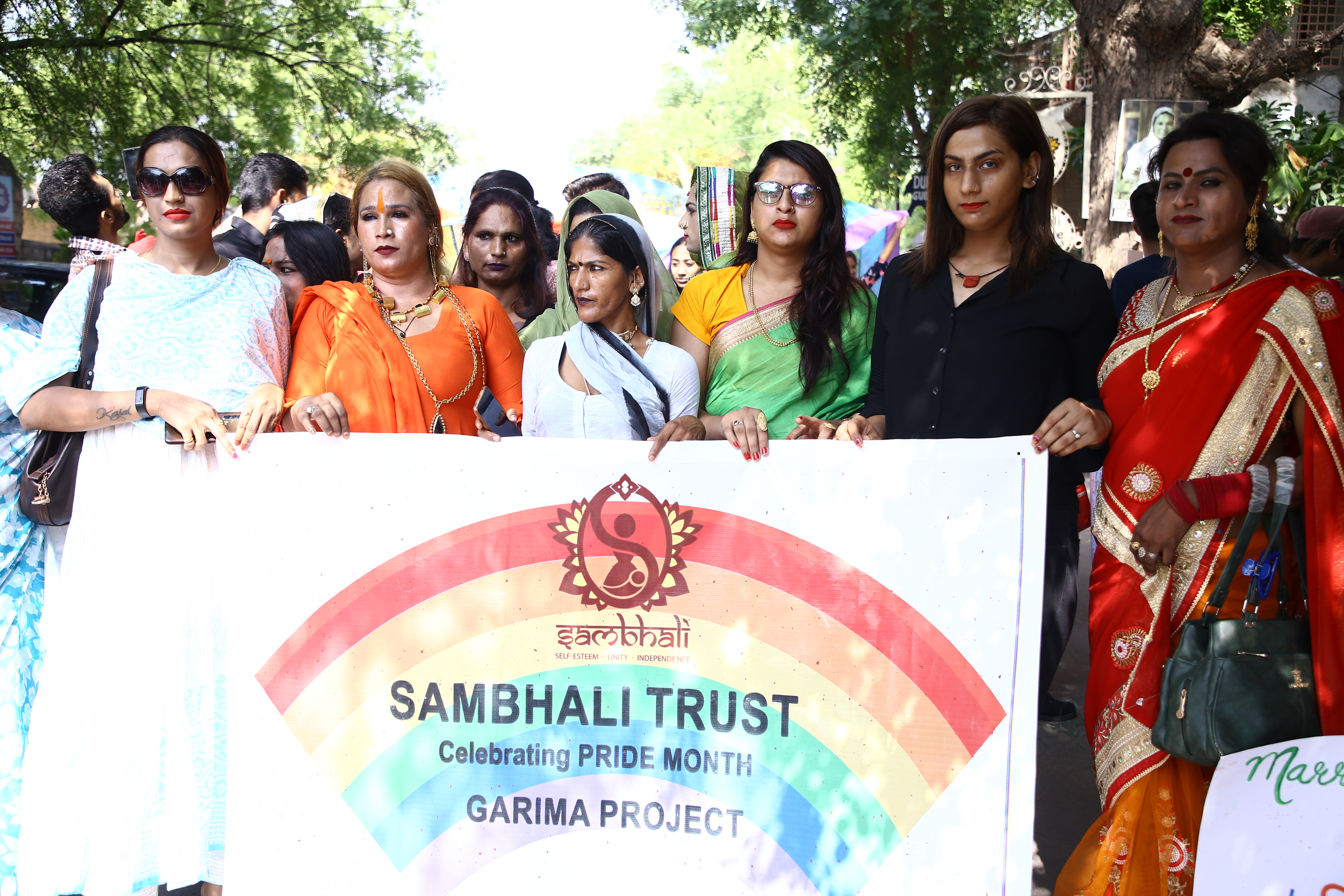
Local Pride march in Jodhpur, organized by Sambhali

It offers a safe space for listening and expression to members of the LGBTQIA+ community who suffer discrimination in the public and family spheres, despite ongoing legal advances. Garima also offers professional support for individuals who have suffered physical, psychological and financial harm, to enable them to emerge from these vulnerable situations. Finally, Garima is committed to greater recognition of the LGBTQIA+ community by organizing collective public events such as the Pride March, while protecting the image of individuals likely to be discriminated against because of their membership of this community. This program benefited 1,680 people in 2024/2025.

=== Aardash project – No Bad Touch ===
Founded in 2014, No Bad Touch intervenes in local schools as well as in Sambhali Trust's empowerment centers and boarding homes with a view to preventing sexual assault. No other school-based program addresses this issue in Rajasthan. In 2024/2025, 4,855 new students benefited from this program, which has reached 32,000 children since its launch.

=== Sambhali Sarai ===
This is a shelter for women and minorities facing violence based on their gender or sexual orientation, and for people who have been rejected by their family.

Each program is headed by a program manager who directs a team of teachers, facilitators and assistants, while encouraging mutual support among beneficiaries. A dozen Hindi and sewing teachers, most of them graduates of the Sambhali program, are assisted by twenty to thirty volunteers from all over the world. Most of the volunteers teach English and mathematics, some specialize in fashion and design while others work within the administration of the association.

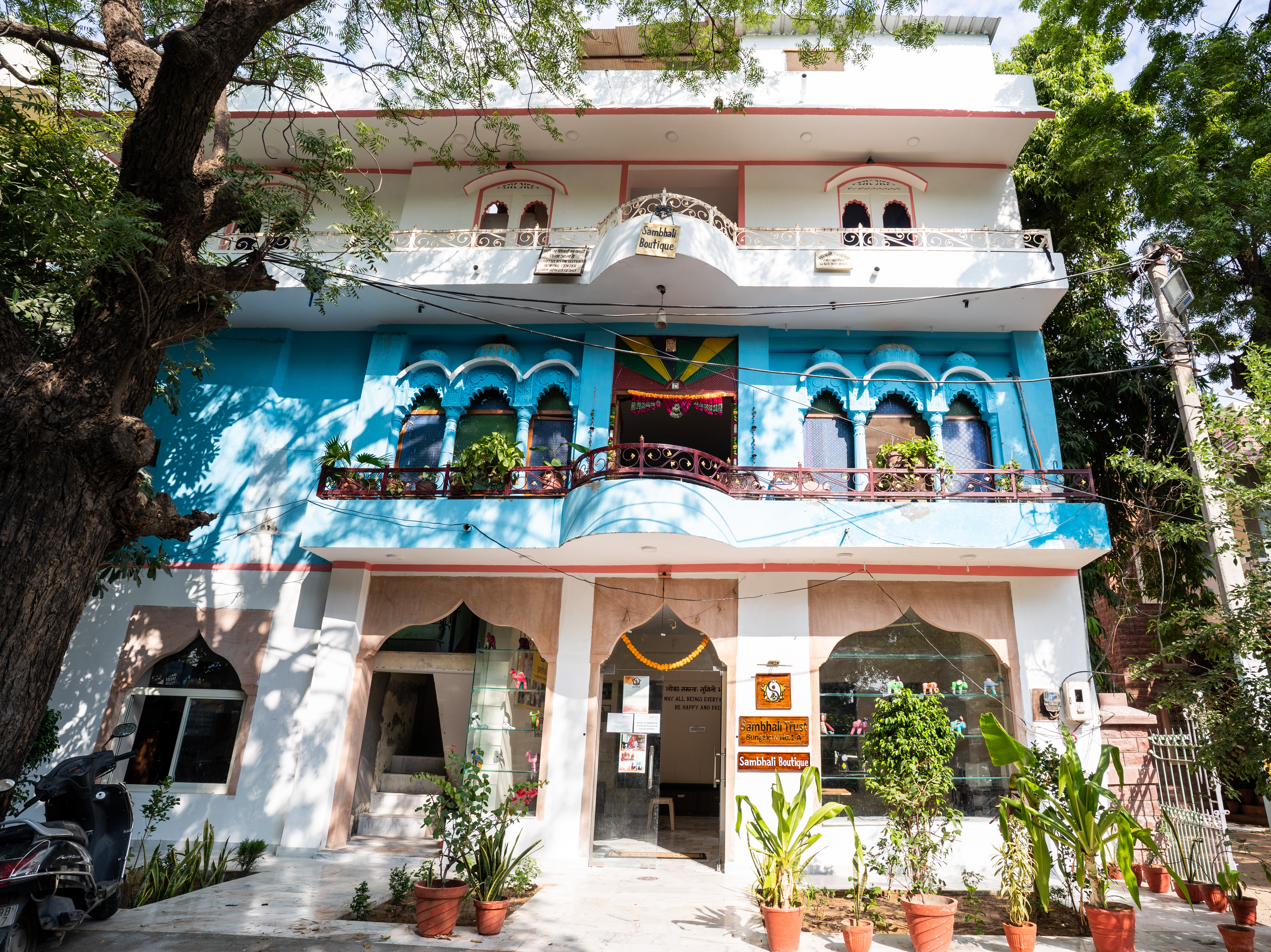
Sambhali headquarters

The Sambhali Trust headquarters in Jodhpur include offices where the administrative team, made up of Sambhali Trust employees and international volunteers, coordinates the association's activities and manages public relations, partnerships and funding. There is also a sewing unit employing fifteen women from the empowerment centers, and a boutique where the work they have produced is sold. Annual income from the boutique is between €400 and €500 a month. It has fallen sharply since the COVID-19 pandemic led to the closure of the historic boutique in Jodhpur's tourist center.

Sambhali Trust is funded largely by individual donors and foreign grants. A number of international foundations, including Frères de nos Frères and the Fondation pour le Logement des défavorisés, have helped to fund Sambhali Trust programs. Since 2013, Sambhali Trust has been affiliated with sister organizations Sambhali Austria, Sambhali Germany, Sambhali Switzerland, Sambhali U.K, Sambhali U.S. and Sambhali France. Donations collected through these sister organizations are all directed to the central Indian based trust.

== Sambhali Trust during COVID-19 ==
During the COVID-19 pandemic, Sambhali Trust played a key role in providing relief to vulnerable communities across western Rajasthan. The organization distributed food kits, hygiene products, and protective equipment to over 30,000 individuals in urban and rural areas. These efforts were supported by international volunteers, private donors, and diplomatic missions from the UK.

During lock down in 2020, Govind Singh Rathore's family and some people from the NGO moved to his village Setrawa. There, most of the people work in mines as laborers and were hit badly by the total lock down. In the strong summer heat of the Indian Thar Desert, some women walked miles to ask the trust for any possible help.

By the end of March 2020, the NGO started to distribute food packages including flour, rice, chili, turmeric & chaï powder, sugar, salt, oil & lentils to 22 tribal families around the family home. A few days after, the Trust established its new project and helped more than 500 families by delivering 2,300 ration kits in 12 villages of Dechu Tehsil from the end of March until the end of July.

== Sambhali Development Foundation ==
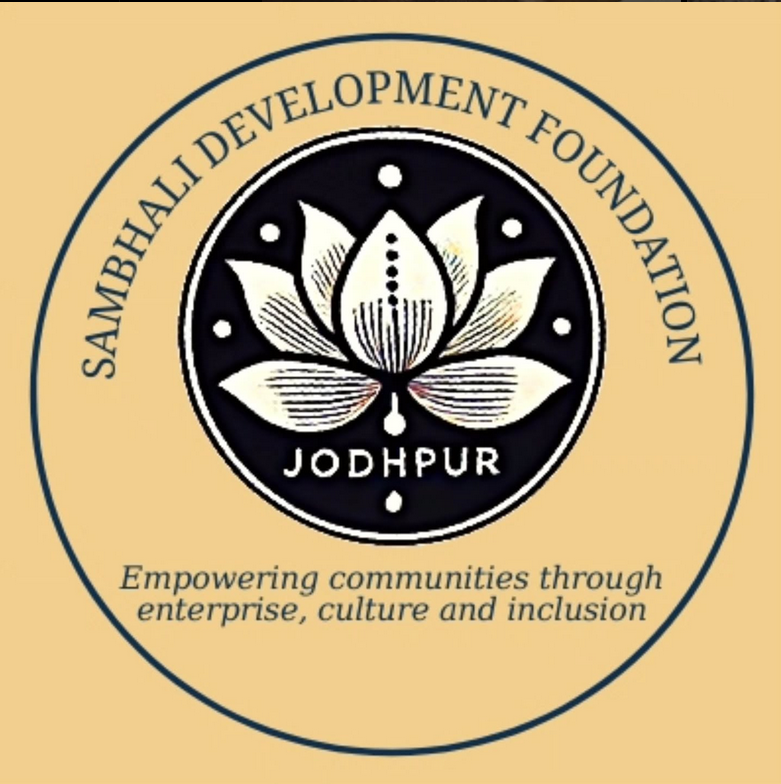
Sambhali Development Foundation logo

In the wake of the COVID-19 pandemic, the NGO Sambhali trust found itself in financial difficulty and in need of international volunteers. In December 2024, Govind Singh Rathore, founder and manager of the NGO, decided to create the Sambhali Development Foundation, in order to remedy this shortage and no longer rely solely on external donations. This foundation is a non-profit initiative aimed at developing tourism in Jodhpur, creating jobs for the LGBTQIA+ communities, fostering the inclusion and fulfillment of Rajasthan's marginalized communities, and raising funds that are entirely donated to the Sambhali trust.

This initiative is based on three projects, managed by people from the LGBTQIA+ community and international volunteers.

=== Sambhali Boutique ===
This project, which already existed before the creation of the Sambhali Development Foundation, has since been developed further. It consists of a boutique in two locations, at the Sambhali trust headquarters in Jodhpur, and adjacent to the Sambhali Café in the old town of Jodhpur. The boutique sells clothes, bags, notebooks, soft toys and other items made entirely by hand by women working in the empowerment centers. These women are paid for their work and the rest of the money goes to the Sambhali trust.

=== Sambhali Café ===
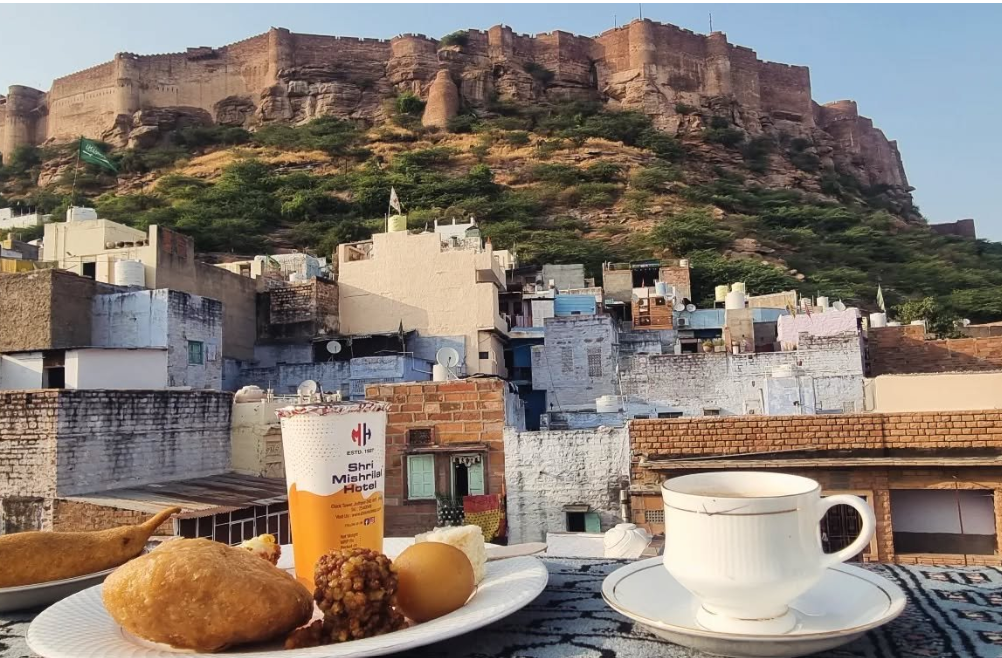
View of the Mehranghar Fort from the Sambhali Cafe rooftop

Located in the heart of Jodhpur's old town, this non-profit café serves hot and cold drinks, as well as sweet and savory dishes typical of Rajasthani cuisine. It is located upstairs from one of the empowerment centers, and all its employees are members of the LGBTQIA+ community. The café creates jobs for marginalized communities and promotes the existence of the NGO to the foreign tourists. All income from the café is used to pay the employees, and the rest is donated to the Sambhali trust.

=== Sambhali Walks ===
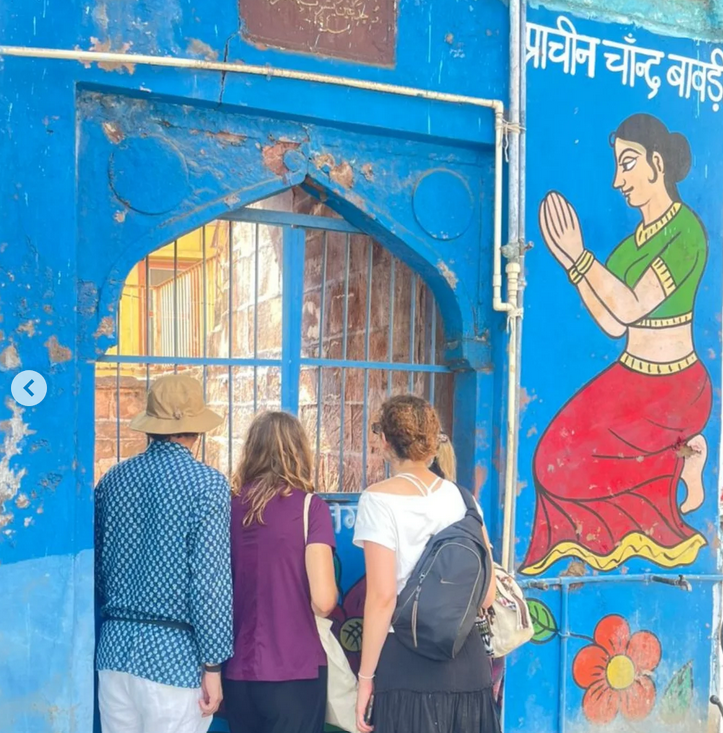
French volunteers during a Sambhali Walk

The Sambhali Walks, led by Virendra Singh Chouhan, are a touristic initiative designed to introduce visitors to the city of Jodhpur and its history, on foot or by tuctuc. It's a walk of a few hours in the alleys of the old city with a guide from the association. During the walk, you learn a great deal about Indian culture and the city of Jodhpur, and particularly about the role of women in Indian life and its history. The walk ends with a tasting of the regional sweet and savory specialties at the Sambhali café. All proceeds from this guided tour are donated to the Sambhali trust NGO.

== Awards and recognition ==
In 2023, Sambhali Trust and its founder Govind Singh Rathore were featured by Outlook India as part of its ‘Grassroots Heroes’ series, recognizing their work in empowering women and marginalized communities, and promoting inclusive development.
