= Tanawara =

Village in Jodhpur, Rajasthan, India

Tanawara Tanawada
- Village
- Location in Rajasthan, India Tanawara (India)
- Coordinates: 26°09′36″N 73°00′25″E
- Country: India
- State: Rajasthan
- District: Jodhpur
- Tehsil: Luni

Population (2011)
  - Total: 2,844

Tanawara is a small village in Luni tehsil of Jodhpur district of Rajasthan in India. According to Census 2011 information the location code or village code of Tanawara village is 085537.

== Location ==
Tanawara village is located in Luni Tehsil of Jodhpur district in Rajasthan, India. It is situated 15 km away from sub-district headquarter Luni and 12 km away from district headquarter Jodhpur. As per 2009 stats, Tanawara village is also a gram panchayat.

== Area ==
The Total geographical area of Tanawara village is 1621 hectares. There are about 491 houses in Tanawara village.

== Population ==
Male Population	Female Population	Total Population
1,480	1,364	2,844
