= Shikarpura =

Village in Rajasthan, India

Coordinates: 26°02′14″N 73°02′31″E

Shikarpura is a village in the Luni Tehsil of the Jodhpur district, Rajasthan, India. It is primarily known as a major spiritual and pilgrimage centre, particularly for the Anjana (Patel) Samaj, as it is the birthplace of Shri Rajaram Ji Maharaj .

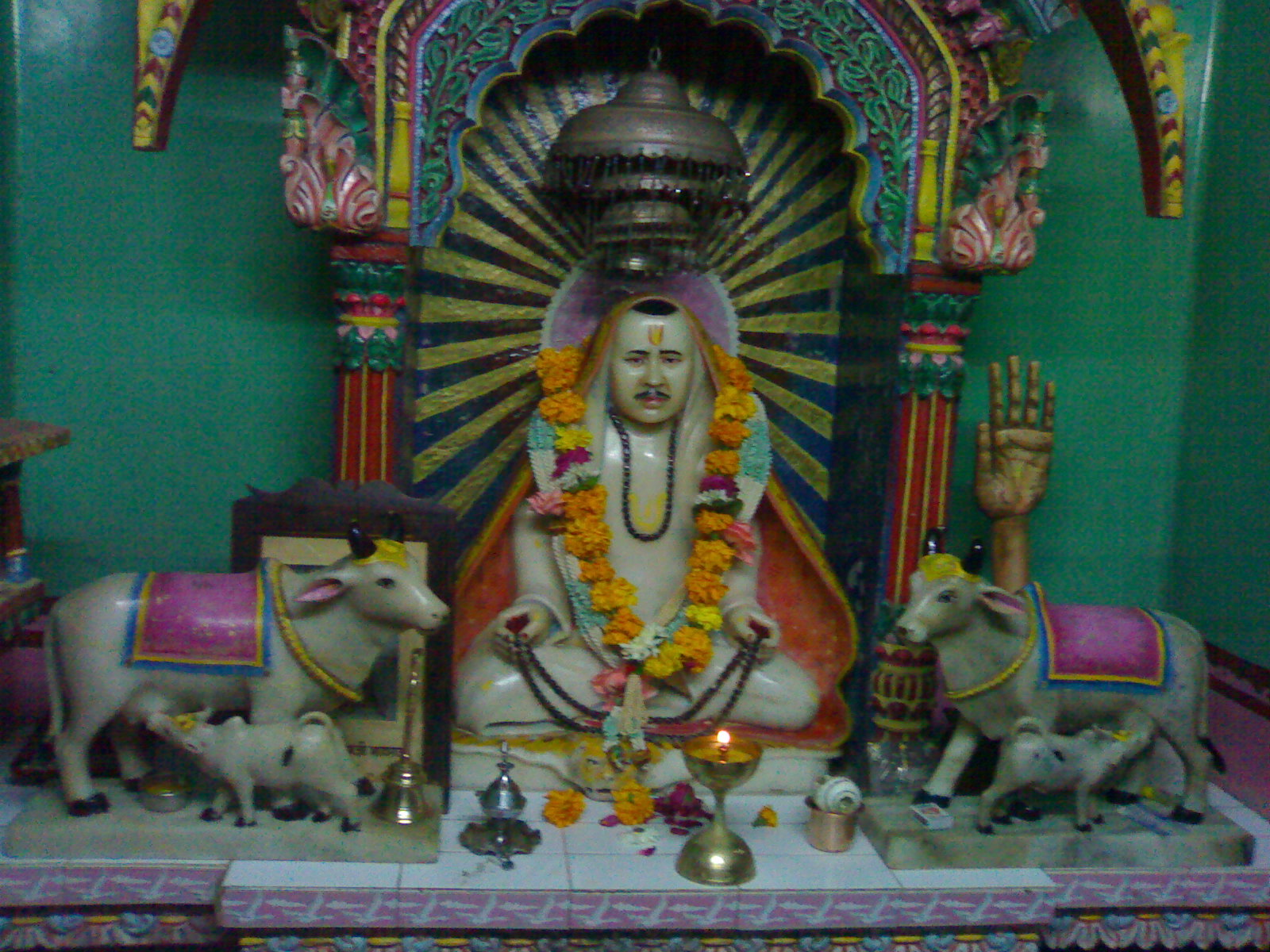
Shri Rajaram Ji Maharaj Shikarpura.
