= Gagari, Rajasthan =

Village in India

Gagari Jelu Gagari
- Village
- Country: India
- State: Rajasthan
- District: Jodhpur
- Tehsil: Tinvari
- Time zone: UTC+5:30 (IST)
- Pin code: 342306

Gagari (also known as Jelu Gagari) it is a village of Tinvari Tehsil of the Jodhpur District, Rajasthan, India. Its pin code is 342306.
