= Balesar Durgawatan =

Balesar Durgawatan Durgawatoas, Balesar D.
- town
- Location in Rajasthan, India Balesar Durgawatan (India)
- Coordinates: 26°27′09″N 72°33′31″E
- Country: India
- State: Rajasthan
- District: Jodhpur
- Tahsil: Balesar

Population (2001)
  - Total: 5,221

Languages
- Time zone: UTC+5:30 (IST)
- ISO 3166 code: RJ-IN
- Vehicle registration: RJ-

Balesar Durgawatan is a panchayat village in the state of Rajasthan, India, Administratively, Balesar Durgawatan is under Balesar tehsil of Jodhpur District in Rajasthan.

There are two villages in the Balesar Durgawatan gram panchayat: Balesar Durgawatan and Deonagar.

== Geography ==
Balesar Durgawatan is located in the Thar Desert at an elevation of 250 meters above mean sea level. The village is 8 km northeast of National Highway 114 at Balesar Satan.

== Demographics ==
In the 2001 census, the village of Balesar Durgawatan had 5,221 inhabitants, with 2,747 males (52.6%) and 2,474 females (47.4%), for a gender ratio of 901 females per thousand males.
