= Budkiya =

Village in Jodhpur (Rajasthan), India

- Village
- Location in Rajasthan, India
- Country: India
- State: Rajasthan
- District: Jodhpur
- Tehsil: Shergarh tehsil

Population (2011)
  - Total: 2,761
- Time zone: UTC+5:30 (IST)
- PIN: 342606

Budkiya is a village in the dechu Shergarh tehsil of Jodhpur District in Rajasthan, India. It is also called Marwar Budkiya. According to 2011 census, it has population is 2761.
