= Chaukhan =

- Village
- Interactive map of Chaukhan
- Location in Rajasthan, India Chaukhan (India)
- Coordinates: 26.2426°N 72.9379°E
- Country: India
- State: Rajasthan
- District: Jodhpur

Population (2011)
  - Total: 6,881
- Time zone: UTC+5:30
- PIN: 342001

Chaukhan, also written Chokhan, is a large village located in Jodhpur, Rajasthan, India. In 2011 it has a population of almost 7,000. Local landmarks include Bhadreshwar Dham Temple and Kadam khandi. Nearby villages include Golasani, Barli, Rajasthan, and Bhadrava Moklavaas. Chokha is situated in the surrounding hills, and Umaid Sagar lake is nearby.
