= Mandor tehsil =

Mandor panchayat samiti Mandore panchayat samiti
- Nickname: Mandore P S
- Location in Rajasthan, India Mandor panchayat samiti (India)
- Country: India
- State: Rajasthan
- District: Jodhpur
- Time zone: UTC+5:30 (IST)
- Postal code: ।342007
- Telephone code: ।0291
- ISO 3166 code: RJ-IN
- Lok Sabha constituency: Jodhpur
- Vidhan Sabha constituency: Jodhpur

Mandor panchayat samiti is a panchayat samiti in Jodhpur District of Rajasthan state in western India.

Mandor panchayat samiti is a central the in Jodhpur District. It borders Osian panchayat samiti and Bawadi panchayat samiti to the north, Bhopalgarh panchayat samiti to the northeast, Luni panchayat samiti to the south, and Balesar panchayat samiti to the west.

== History ==
In 2009 Mandor panchayat samiti was created out of the rural portion of Jodhpur District. Jodhpur conectarte is an island in Mandor panchayat samiti.

== Demographics ==
In the 2001 Indian census, the rural population of Jodhpur conectarte which became Mandor panchayat samiti recorded 208,836 inhabitants of which 109,560 (52.5%) were male and 99,276 (47.5%) were female, with a gender ratio of 906 females per thousand males. In 2001 in the area that became Mandor tehsil, 100% of the households were rural.

== Villages ==
There are twenty-eight panchayat villages in Mandor panchayat samiti. These are the panchayat villages and subject villages, with the exception of where they are not yet mapped (NYM):

- Alakhdara
- Banar
  - Deoliya
  - Jajiwal Kutri
  - Nandra-Khurd
  - Soder Ki Dhani
  - Vishnoiyon Ki Dhani
- Banwarla (Bawarla)
- Akthali
  - Sooraj Basni
- Basni Beda - NYM
- Beru (Beroo)
  - Dedipa Nada
  - Salori
- Bisalpur
  - Bhaton Ki Dhani
  - Dhayalon Ki Dhani
- Bisalpur 3 - NYM
- Bisalpur 4 - NYM
- Chokha (Chaukhan)
  - Barli
  - Golasani
- Daikara
- Budh Nagar
  - aasanada
- Dangiyawas
- Indroka
  - Khokhari
  - Manai
- Jajiwal Kalla (Jajiwal Kalan)
  - Jajiwal Bhandariya
  - Jajiwal Brahmana
  - Jajiwal Dhandhala
  - Jajiwal Gehlota
  - Jajiwal Godara
  - Jajiwal Jakharan
  - Jajiwal Kakrala
  - Jajiwal Khichiyan
  - Jajiwal Vishnoiyan
- Jalali Fauzdara (Jaleli Faujdaran)
  - Basni Nikooban
  - Kanawas Ka Pana
- Joliyali
  - Bambor Darjiyan
  - Bambor Purohitan
  - Hem Nagar
  - Legon Ki Dhani
  - Meglasiya
  - Pooniyon Ki Pyau
  - Purakhpur
- Karwar
  - Desooriya Kharolan
  - Desooriya Vishnoiyan
  - Gharab
  - Jheepasani
- Keru (Keroo)
  - Mahadeonagar Undera
  - Shiv Sarnon Ki Dhani
- Khatiyasany (Khatiyasani)
  - Asanda
  - Dantiwara
- Lordi Daijagara (Lordi Daijagra)
  - Karani
  - Lordi Doliya
- Lordi Pandit Ji (Lordi-Pandit Ji)
  - Jajiwal Bhatiyan
  - Jaleli Daikara
  - Kukanda
  - Ralawas
  - Thabukra
- Manaklao
  - Basni Karwar
  - Basni Lachhan
  - Daijar
  - Palri Khichiyan
- Nandra Kalla (Nandara Kalan)
  - Basni Bedan
  - Nandri (Census Town)
  - Siriyade Gaon
  - Uchiyarda
- Narwa Khichiyan
  - Bhirkali
  - Jakharo Ki Dhani
  - Palri Mangaliya
  - Palri Panwara
- Peethawas
  - Doliya
  - Jaleli Champawatan
  - Jatiyawas
  - Roodkali
- Popawas
  - Basni Sepha
  - Chawanda
  - Ghantiyala
  - Rajwa
  - Sirodi
- Rohilla Kallan (Rohila Kalan)
  - Daon Ki Dhani
  - Mokalawas
  - Naron Ki Dhani
  - Rohila Khurd
- Salwa Kalla (Salwa Kalan)
  - Karwali Dhani
  - Ram Nagar
- Soorpura (Surpura)
  - Anganwa
  - Balakua
  - Bora Was
  - Gujrawas Khurd
  - Khokharia

== Notes ==
26°30′15″N 073°12′45″E
