= Shergarh, Rajasthan =

Shergarh Kōśavardhana
- Village
- Location in Rajasthan, India Shergarh (India)
- Country: India
- State: Rajasthan
- District: Jodhpur District

Government
  - Type: Panchayat village

Population (2001)
  - Total: 6,054
  - Male Population: 3,160
  - Female Population: 2,894

Shergarh is a village located in the Jodhpur District of Rajasthan state in western India. It is a panchayat village as well as being the tehsil headquarters for Srgar tehsil.

== Demographics ==
In the India census of 2001, Shergarh had a population of 6,054. Males constituted 3,160 of the population and females 2,894, for a gender ratio of 916 females per thousand males.
