= Kanodiya Purohitan =

Kanodia Purohitan Kanodiya Purohitan
- village
- Location in Rajasthan, India Kanodia Purohitan (India)
- Coordinates: 26°43′28″N 72°21′05″E
- Country: India
- State: Rajasthan
- District: Jodhpur
- Tahsil: Balesar

Area
  - Total: 25 km^{2} (9.7 sq mi)

Population (2001)
  - Total: 3,862
  - Density: 150/km^{2} (400/sq mi)

Demographics
- Time zone: UTC+5:30 (IST)
- Telephone code: +91 2928
- ISO 3166 code: RJ-IN
- Vehicle registration: RJ-19
- Climate: Dry (Köppen: BSh)
- Temperature: Summer: 50°C (122°F); Winter: 0°C (32°F)
- Lok Sabha constituency: Jodhpur
- Vidhan Sabha Constituency: Shergarh
- Website: www.kanodiapurohitan.com

Kanodiya Purohitan is a panchayat village in the Indian state of Rajasthan. It is situated on Jaisalmer Highway (NH-125), 120 km from Jodhpur.

== History ==
It is one of the oldest villages of the Rajpurohits. Historically, it was awarded to Dharayatji Rajpurohit. Prior to 2009, Kanodia was part of ILRC Balesar within Shergarh tehsil.

Newer villages include Chatar Singh nagar and Tikam Singh nagar, Hastinapur (named for late Hasti singh Rajpurohit) and Shree Ratneshwar Nagar (named for Jhunjaar Shree Dadosa Ratan Singh Ji).

== Economy ==
It is a three-crop village. Half of the population is engaged in agriculture, and the rest are either in the armed forces or in business.

== Geography ==
It is surrounded by sand dunes with much greenery.

Kanodia is divided into three parts, one each for Dedaji, Raghoji and Netoji.

== Religion ==
Dadoji Ratan Singhji Jhunjharji temple is owned by the whole village and is worshiped by all castes. Major decisions are made there, and on every Holi and Diwali, the whole village gathers.

A society named Bothiya Nagar is nearby.

== Demographics ==
In the 2001 census, the village of Kanodiya Purohitan had 3,862 inhabitants, with 2,028 males (52.5%) and 1,834 females (47.5%), for a sex ratio of 904 females per thousand males.
