= Lolawas =

- village
- Location in Rajasthan, India Lolawas (India)
- Coordinates: 26.10°N 73.32°E
- Country: India
- State: Rajasthan
- District: Jodhpur
- Elevation: 375 m (1,230 ft)

Population (2001)
  - Total: 1,102

Languages
  - Official: Hindi
- Time zone: UTC+5:30 (IST)
- ISO 3166 code: RJ-IN

Lolawas is a small village southeast of Jodhpur in Jodhpur District of Rajasthan, India.

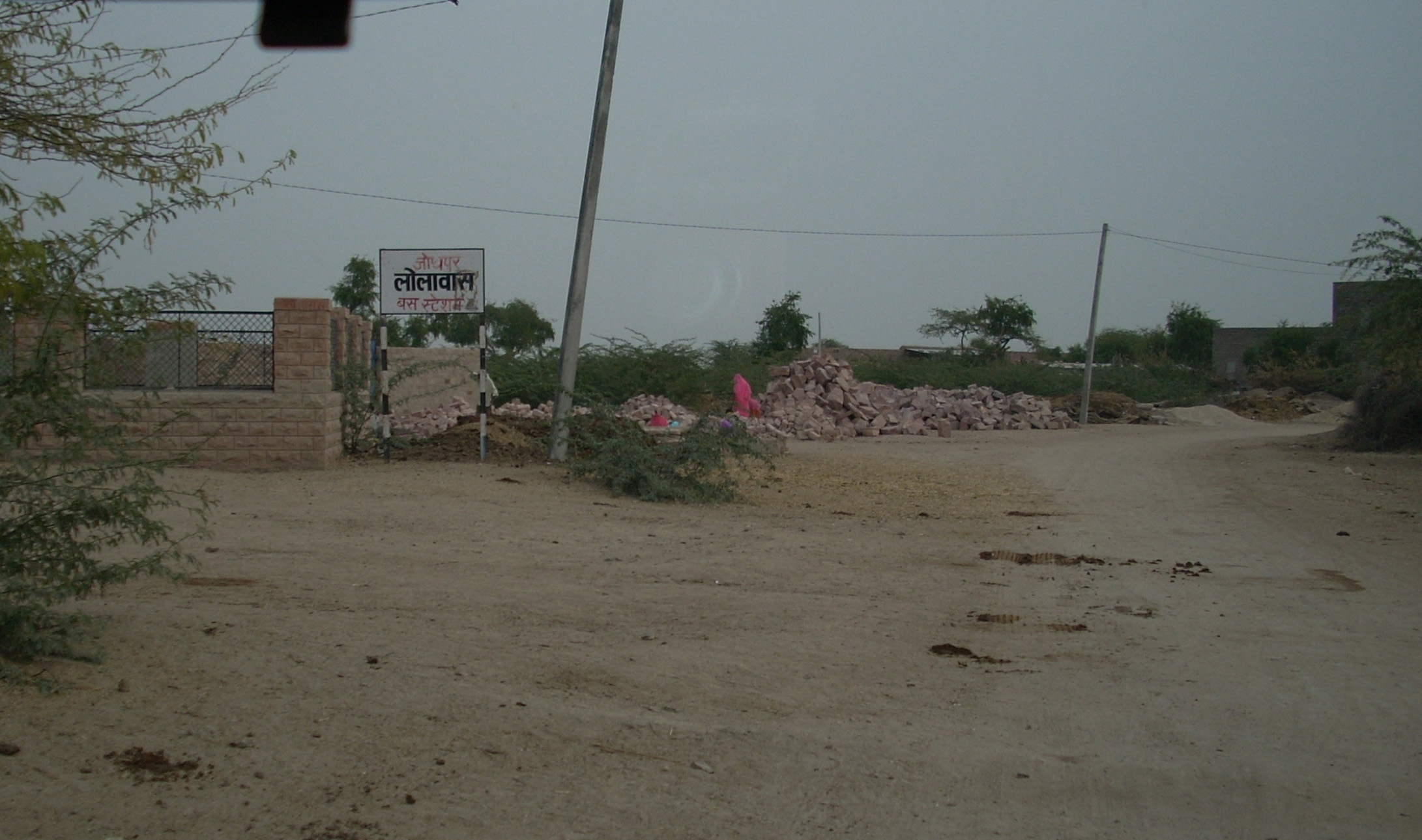
Village Lolawas Jodhpur India

Per the 2001 census, the number of households in the village stood at 191 with a total population of 1,102 people. 508 were male and 594 were female.

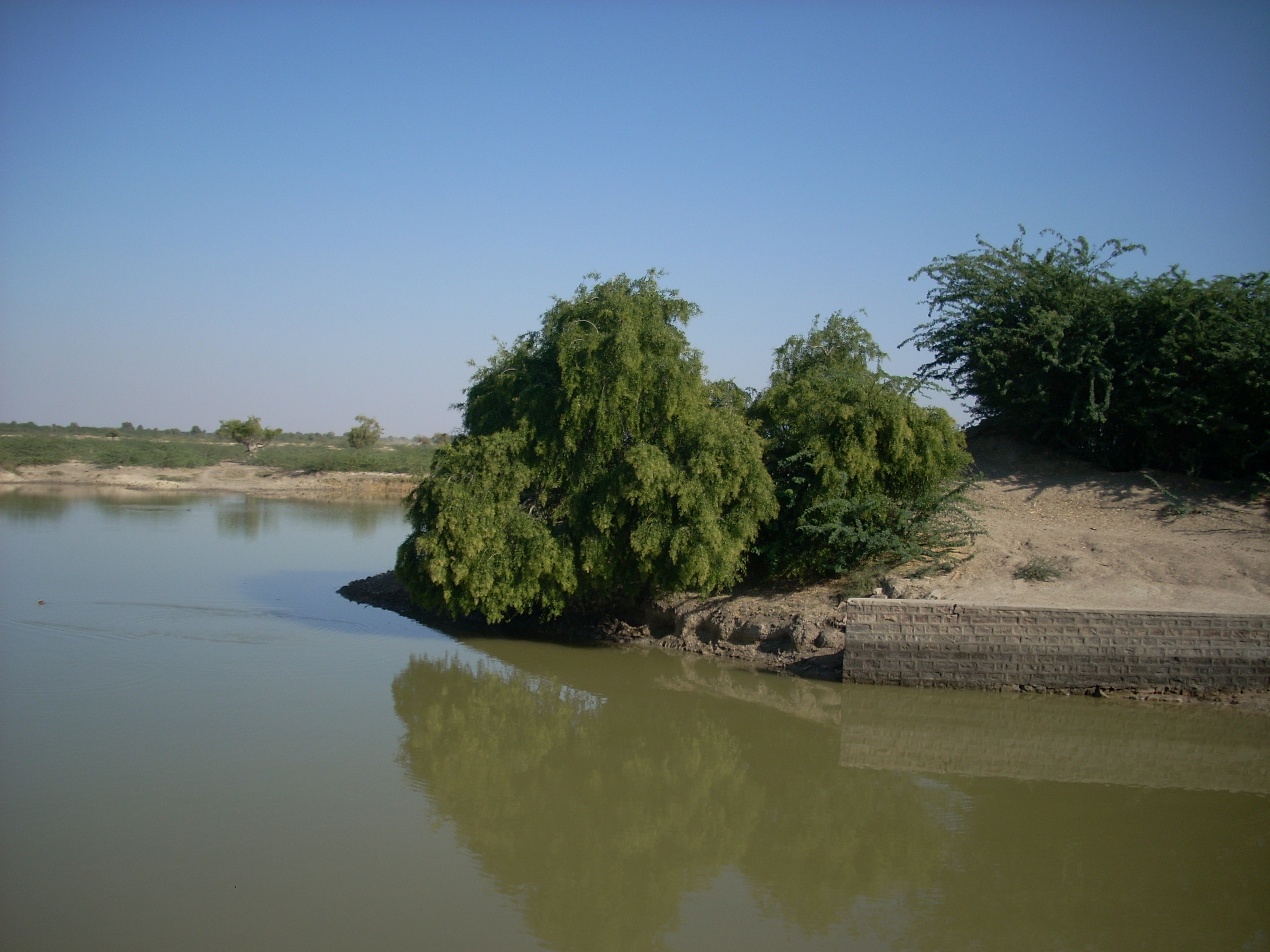
Village Pond Lolawas Jodhpur India

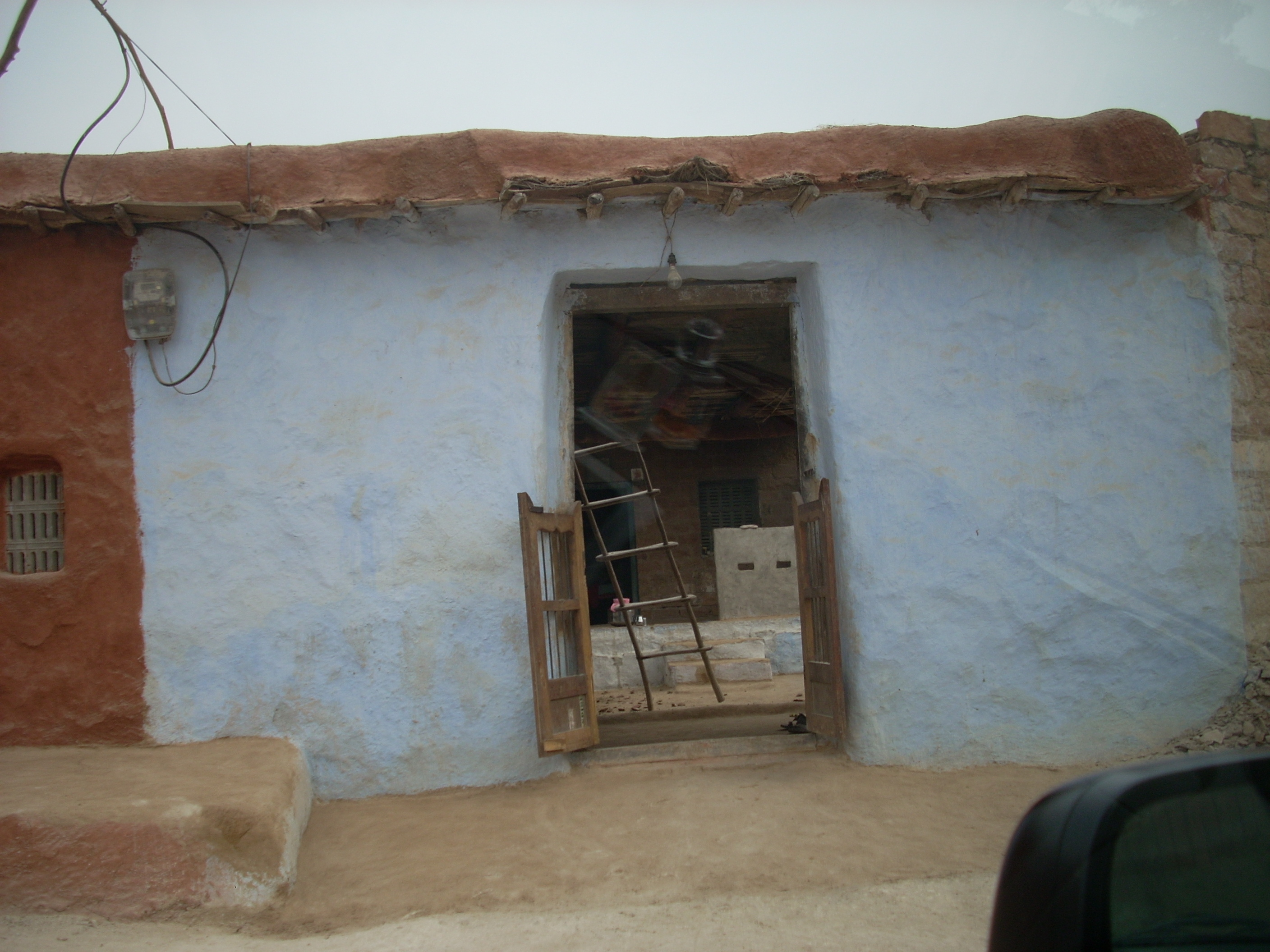
Village Hut Lolawas JodhpurIndia

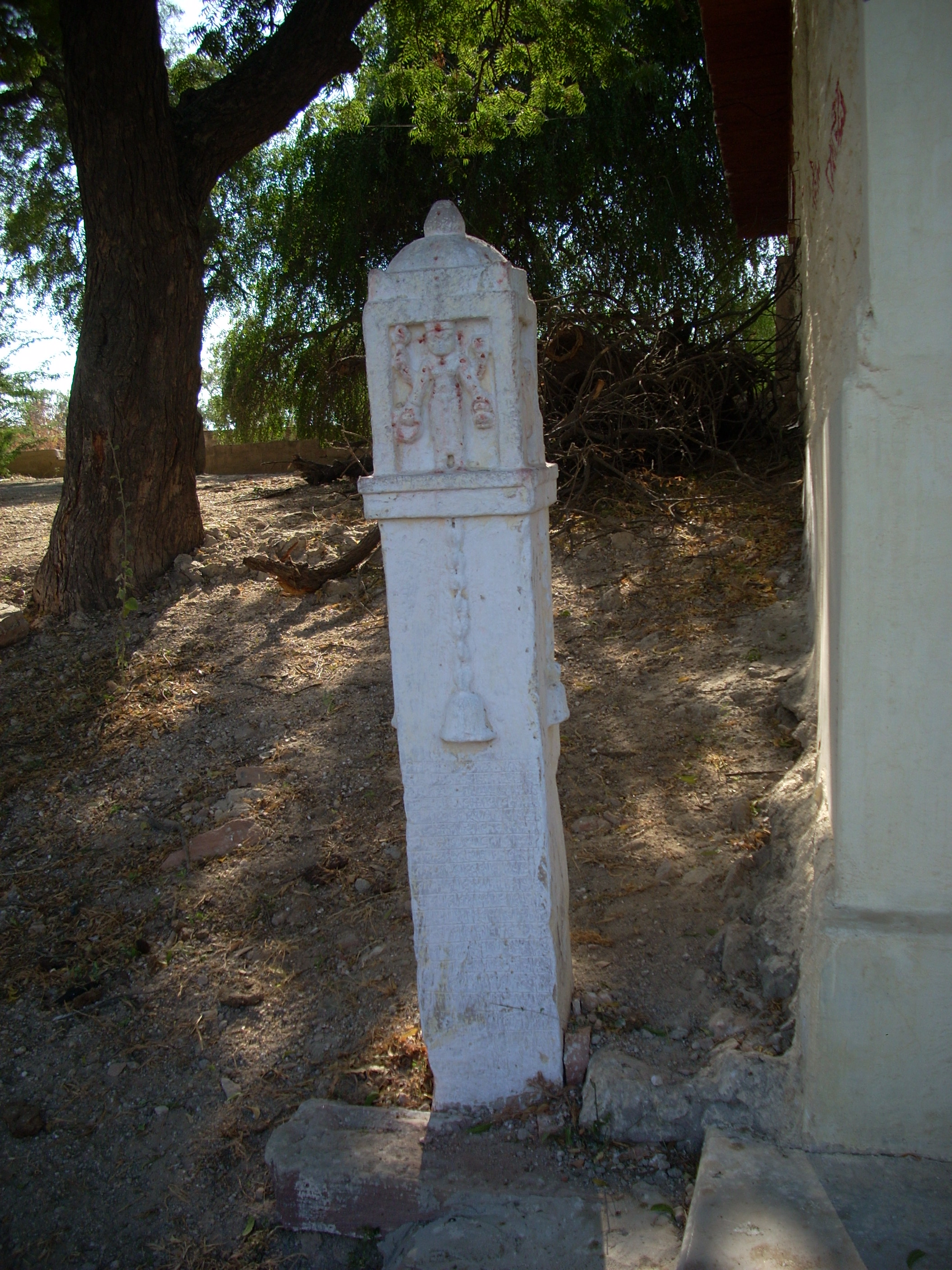
Village Lolawas Jodhpur India

The main population of village is of JAAT .

== See also ==
- Dhani and villages JAT good people of lolawas
