= Lalit Surajmal Kanodia =

Indian business entrepreneur (born 1941)

Dr. Lalit Kanodia
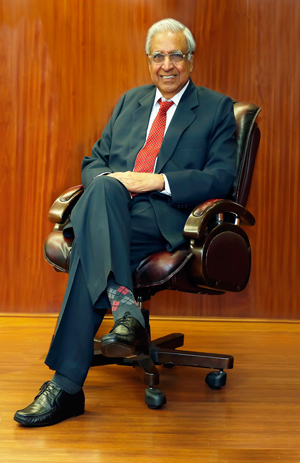
- Lalit Kanodia
- Born: 30 March 1941 (age 84); Kolkata, India
- Education: 1959-1963 Indian Institute of Technology Bombay, India. Mechanical Engineering 1963-1967 Massachusetts Institute of Technology, Cambridge. United States, MBA & Ph.D in Management
- Spouse: Asha Kanodia (m. 1965)
- Children: 4

Lalit Surajmal Kanodia (born 30 March 1941) is an Indian entrepreneur. He is the founder and chairman of the Datamatics Group. He has held positions in business organisations such as the Indo-American Chamber of Commerce, the Indian Merchants Chamber, and served as president of the Management Consultants Association of India.

== Early life and education ==
Kanodia was born in Kolkata, India, to Surajmal Kanodia, a bullion merchant, and Chandravati Kanodia, a homemaker. His family moved to Mumbai in 1942.

Kanodia attended the Bombay Scottish School in Mumbai, where he captained the football team and competed in athletics. He studied science at Elphinstone College, Bombay University, for two years and then was admitted to the Indian Institute of Technology Bombay to study Mechanical Engineering. After graduating in 1963, he earned a Master of Science in Management from MIT in 1965, supported by a Ford Fosndation Fellowship, and returned to MIT in 1966 to complete his PhD in management in 1967 Kanodia was a member of Project MAC at MIT, which developed the Compatible Time-Sharing System and MULTICS (early multi-user computer operating systems and precursors to UNIX).

== Teaching ==
While at MIT, Kanodia taught a course on statistical decision theory to MBA students (1964–65). He also taught MBA students for two years (1968–70) at the Jamnalal Bajaj Institute of Management Studies, Bombay University, India.

== Tata Consultancy Services ==
In 1965, J.R.D. Tata, then chairman of the Tata Group, tasked Kanodia with studying the feasibility of computerisation within the Tata Group. Kanodia's work resulted in:

1. The automation of Tata Electric Companies’ Load Dispatch System by Westinghouse,
2. The computerisation of the company’s electricity billing system,
3. The establishment of a software development centre.

Kanodia returned to MIT for his doctorate and later rejoined the Tata Group to lead its newly proposed software division. In 1967, he founded the Tata Computer Center, which was renamed Tata Consultancy Services (TCS) in 1968.

== Consulting ==
While in the United States, Kanodia consulted for Arthur D. Little and the Ford Motor Company. He also consulted for the State Bank of India, the Somani Group, and the Kamani Group of companies.

== Datamatics ==
In 1975, Kanodia founded Datamatics, an IT company. By 1979, the company had established an offshore development center for Wang Laboratories. In 1991, Datamatics implemented a satellite link for software development between Mumbai and AT&T Bell Labs USA; this contributed to the early development of BPO services in India. Kanodia then started "Datamatics Technologies Limited," focusing on BPO and KPO services. Expansion into BPO services led Datamatics to acquire US-based companies SAZTEC in 1997 and CorPay in 2003. Datamatics has continued to acquire other international companies since then. Kanodia is Group Chairman of Datamatics which comprises:

- Datamatics Global Services Ltd (A listed Company with BSE/NSE)
- CIGNEX Datamatics Technologies Ltd
- Lumina Datamatics Ltd
- Datamatics Staffing Services Ltd

== Personal life ==
Kanodia has four children with his wife, Asha. His eldest son, Rahul Kanodia is the vice chairman and CEO of Datamatics Global Services, and his youngest son, Sameer Kanodia, is an Executive Director. He also has two daughters, Aneesha and Amrita.

== Recognition ==
1. Indian Affairs Indian of the Year Award for IT, Consulting and BPO services
2. Special Achievement Award at Asia Pacific Entrepreneurship Awards
3. Global Achiever Award for Business Excellence
4. Award from the Prime Minister of India for the most innovative software product

Kanodia was president of the Management Consultants Association of India. He is the president of the Indo-American Chamber of Commerce. He is the vice president of Indian Merchants Chamber and chairman of its IT committee. He was a member of the executive committee of NASSCOM. He has been the chairman of Electronic & Computer Software Export Promotion Council (Western Region). He joined the Sloan School of Management's executive board at MIT in 2008. He served as the Honorary Consul General of Chile in India from 2002 to 2014.
