= Balesar, Karnataka =

Balesar
- Location in Karnataka, India Balesar (India)
- Coordinates: 14°28′12″N 74°47′53″E
- Country: India
- Region: Konkan
- State: Karnataka
- District: Uttara Kannada
- Taluka: Siddapur

Languages
  - Official: Kannada
- Time zone: UTC+5:30 (IST)

Balesar is a small village in Uttara Kannada, Karnataka State, India. Administratively, it is under Hasaragod gram panchayat of Siddapura Taluka of Uttara Kannada.

== Demographics ==
As of 2001 census, the village of Balesar had 475 inhabitants, with 249 males (52.4%) and 226 females (47.6%), for a gender ratio of 908 females per thousand males.
