= Narayan Singh Manaklao =

Indian politician

Narayan Singh Manaklao is a noted social worker of India and was member of the Rajya Sabha, by nomination during August 2003 to August 2009. He is also a recipient of the Padma Bhushan award. He was born in Jodhpur district of Rajasthan in 1942.

He was awarded the Padma Bhushan in 1991 by the Government of India in recognition of dedicated services rendered in helping to reduce the anti-social consumption of opium by organizing systematic and scientific de-addiction programmes, Founded a Trust called Opium De Addiction Treatment Training Research Turst Manaklao which have benefited thousands of rural and urban men, women and children drawn from all strata of society since 1978 and he started this Institute at Manaklao in Jodhpur District. He established Sucheta Kriplani Shiksha Niketan, a unique residential Senior Secondary School to impart free and quality education to the physically disabled children in 1991.

He had earlier received Padma Shri in 1986. Currently he is providing scholarships to poor children to fulfil their dreams by a NGO he is part of.
