= Dewatu =

- Village
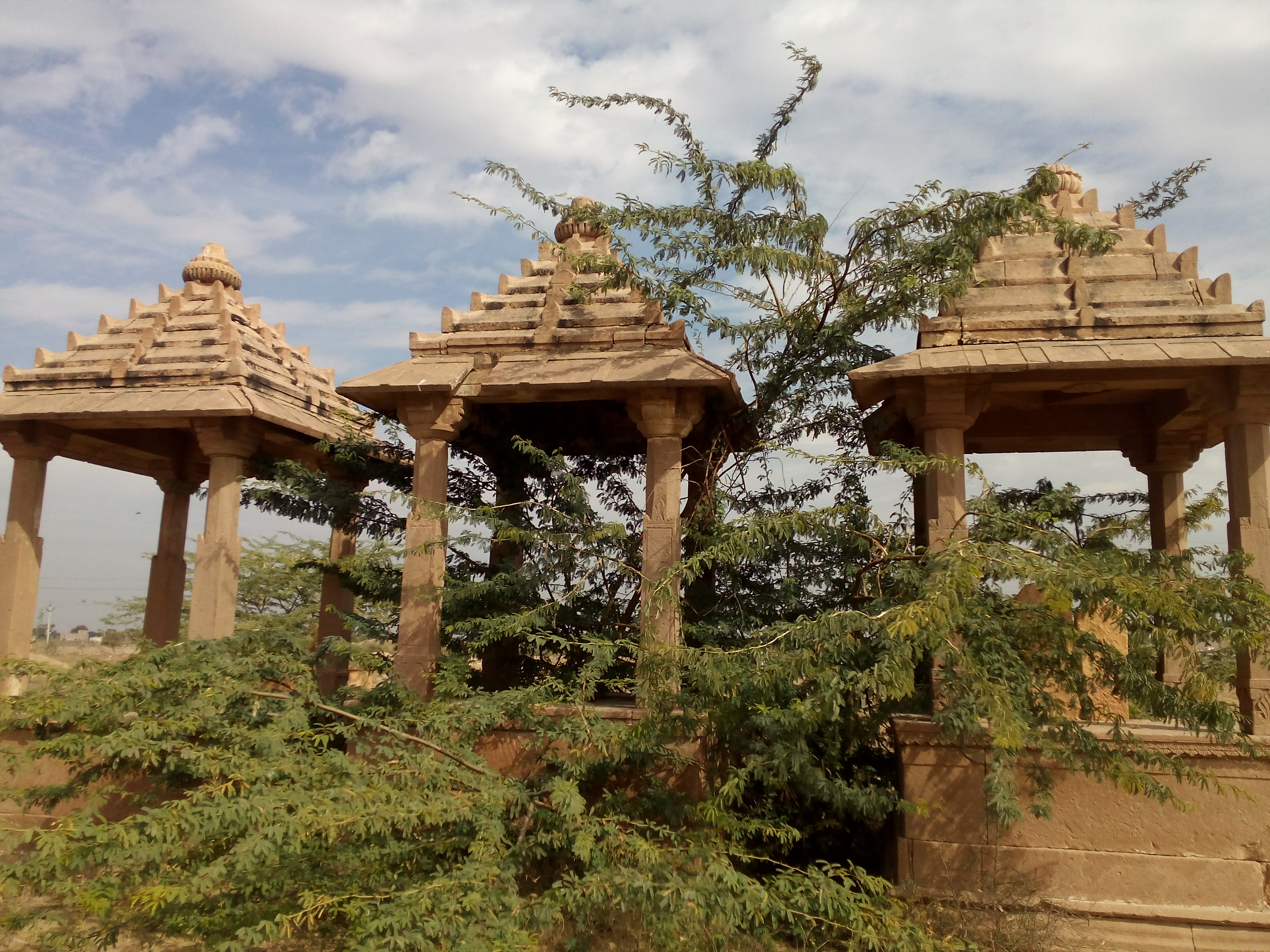
- Old Rajputi Chhatri in Dewatu
- Interactive map of Dewatu
- Coordinates: 26.644°N 72.467°E
- Country: India
- State: Rajasthan
- District: Jodhpur
- Tehsil: Balesar
- Time zone: UTC+05:30 (IST)
- PIN: 342025

Dewatu or Dewatoo is a village Panchayat in Balesar tehsil of Jodhpur district in Rajasthan state of India. It has a Government Senior Secondary School and many private schools.

According to the 2011 Census of India, Dewatu village's total population is 1833 and the number of houses is 340. Local language is Marwari.
