= Shah Bhopal Chand Lodha =

Shah Bhopalchandji Lodha (15 December 1898 – 5 July 1987) was Public Works Secretary of the former Jodhpur State.

== Biography ==
A commerce graduate from Sydenham College, Bombay he went on to become the Public Works Secretary of the former Jodhpur State . As Secretary PWD he was instrumental in the overall development of Jodhpur.The Water Canal; The Umaid Bhawan Palace; The Sardar School, Maharaj Umaid Mills Pali;Sardar Samand Water Supply Scheme;Windham Hospital (renamed Mahatma Gandhi Hospital) and Umaid Hospital; High Court Building; Barracks and Ancillary Aerodrome (made in two months) which later became the Elementary Flying Training College and other works were undertaken during his tenure. He was honoured with the title of Rai Sahib for his extraordinary services to the state.

His greatest quality was his enduring belief that nothing is impossible for which the late Maharaja Hanwant Singhji of Jodhpur named him Alladin ka Chirag. He was the 20th century titan of Marwar and remembered as the architect and builder of Modern Jodhpur.

In 1940, he was presented a stick of honour on behalf of His Majesty by the Viceroy of India, Lord Linlithgow for his contributions to the development of Jodhpur
