= Peelwa =

- Village
- Location in Rajasthan, India
- Coordinates: 26°50′55″N 72°26′15″E
- Country: India
- State: Rajasthan
- District: Jodhpur
- Tehsil: Lohawat

Population (2011)
  - Total: 5,878
- Time zone: UTC+5:30 (IST)
- PIN: 342309

Peelwa is a village in Jodhpur district, in the state of Rajasthan, India. The village's PIN code is 342309. It is part of Phalodi Tehsil.
