= Kan Singh Parihar =

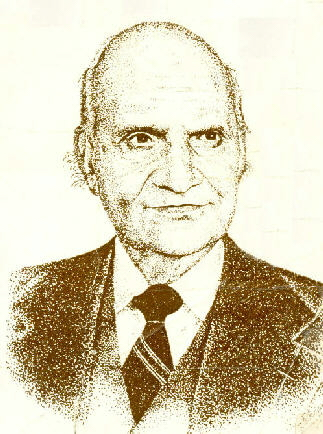
- Kan Singh Parihar

Judge Rajasthan High Court
- In office August 1964 – August 1975

Vice Chancellor, University of Jodhpur
- In office 1979–1980

Personal details
- Born: August 30, 1913 Jodhpur State, Rajputana
- Died: October 28, 2011 (aged 98) Jodhpur, Rajasthan, India
- Spouse: Smt. Kamla Devi
- Children: 4 sons and 2 daughters
- Website: web.archive.org/web/20071006084412/http://www.justicekansingh.org/index.htm

Kan Singh Parihar (30 August 1913 – 28 October 2011) was an Indian judge of Rajasthan High Court and Vice Chancellor of University of Jodhpur.

== Early life and education ==
Kan Singh Parihar was born on 30 August 1913 on Janmastami in Soorsagar, Jodhpur, Rajasthan, India in a Kshatriya Parihar family. In 1919, his father, Shri Chhog Singh Ji Parihar died, leaving him to be raised by his mother Smt. Murali Devi ji. Parihar had his primary education in Soorsagar. In 1928, he enrolled in Darbar High School. He obtained his BA from Jaswant College, Jodhpur in 1933. In 1936, he received his law (LL.B.) degree from Banaras Hindu University and obtained first division.

== Professional life ==
Hon'ble Mr. Justice Kan Singh Parihar taking oath as a High Court Judge by the Hon'ble Governor of Rajasthan Sardar Shri Hukam Singh, Jodhpur 1964.

In 1936, he joined the bar at Jodhpur and joined a law practice with Sardar Shri Amolak Singh, a senior criminal lawyer. At the age of 23, he was the first lawyer from the all Kisan community of Marwar. In early 1938, he established his legal practice in Nagaur, Rajasthan. After practising successfully at Nagaur for seven years, he joined Marwar State Judicial Service in 1944 as a Haakim (Judge). Subsequently, he was appointed as Legal Remembrancer in the Marwar State's Law Department at Jodhpur. While working on this position he drafted Marwar Tenancy Act. 1949 and Marwar Land Revenue Act. 1949. The Acts declared all tenants in cultivatory possession as Khatedars (Land owners).

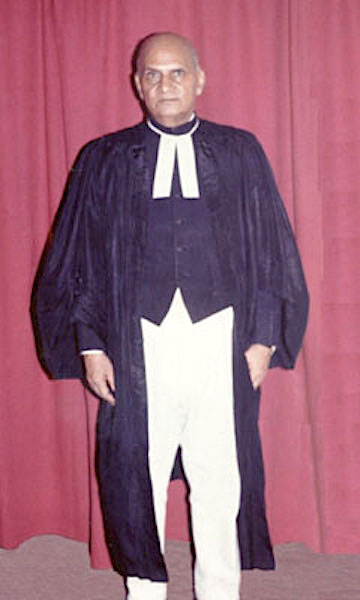
Hon'ble Mr. Justice Kan Singh Parihar, Rajasthan High Court, Jodhpur, India - 1974.

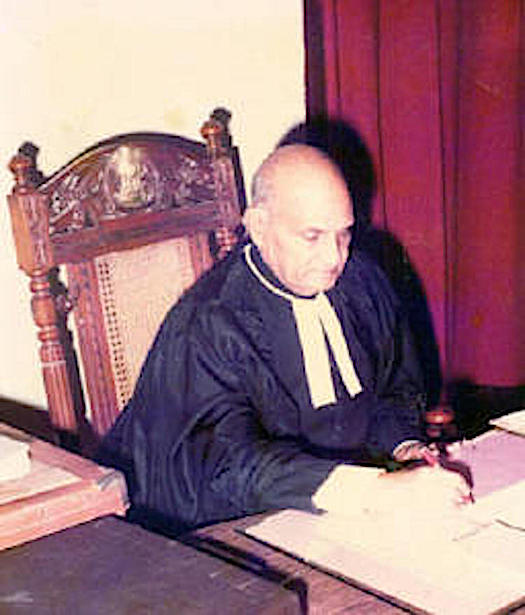
Hon'ble Mr. Justice Kan Singh Parihar in his chamber, Rajasthan High Court, Jodhpur, India-1974.

Shri Kan Singh Parihar celebrating the Holi (festival of colours) at his residence with judges, lawyers, professors and citizens of Jodhpur in 1970.

In the newly created State of Rajasthan Parihar was appointed as a Legal Remembrancer in the Law Department of Rajasthan. In 1953 he was appointed Government Advocate at Rajasthan High Court. He was later designated a Senior Advocate in the Supreme Court of India. He was elected unanimously president of Rajasthan Advocates Bar Association in 1962. In August 1964, he was elevated to the bench of the Rajasthan High Court where he served as a justice for 11 years until his retirement in August 1975.

After his retirement, Parihar was offered the Chairmanship of National Tribunal at Jabalpur. He was also offered Chairmanship of Monopolies Trade Commission at New Delhi by the Prime Minister of India Indira Gandhi. In 1977 he was appointed Chairman of Emergency Excesses Inquiry Commission (The Kan Singh Commission) by the Rajasthan Government and again in 1979 he was appointed Vice Chancellor of University of Jodhpur (now Jai Narain Vyas University).

== Public life ==
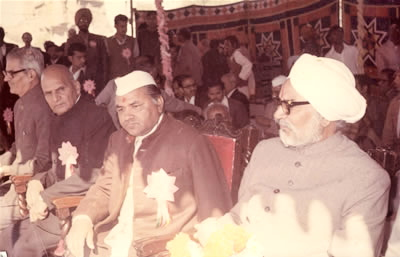
L to R Shri Ram Niwas Mirdha, Shri Kan Singh Parihar, Shri Haridev Joshi (CM Rajasthan) and Shri Swaran Singh at the all Rajasthan Kishan Sammelan in Jodhpur 1973.

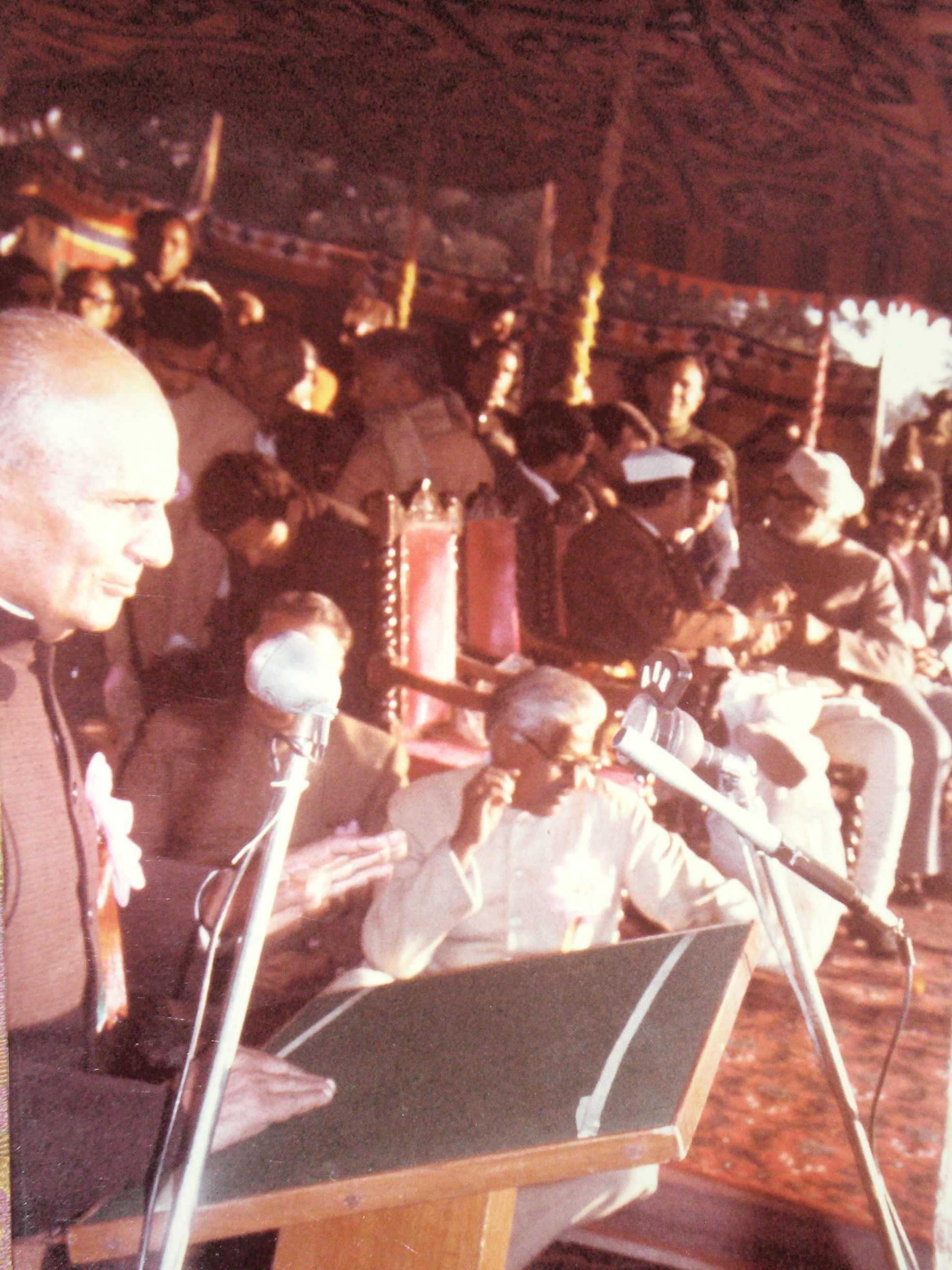
Shri Kan Singh Parihar addressing the "All Rajasthan Kishan Sammelan" in 1973 at Jodhpur. L to R Shri Haridev Joshi (CM Rajasthan), Shri Swaran Singh (Central Minister) and Shri Gaj Singh (Maharaja of Marwar). Shri Poonam Chand Vishnoi and Shri Mathura Das Mathur also sitting on stage.

After retirement, Parihar worked with various social, educational and religious institutions in Jodhpur. Parihar has been patron and president of many organisations such as Lions Club of Jodhpur West (He was founder president of Lions Club Jodhpur 1967), Jodhana (Citizen's Council of Jodhpur), Veer Durga Das Samiti, Bhartiya Vidhya Bhawan, Mental Hospital Jodhpur. He has also been associated with Than Chand Mehta Trust, Jagdish Singh Gehlot Research Institute, Gita Bhawan Jodhpur (He was president of Gita Bhawan for 17 years from 1975 to 1992), Vishva Sanskrit Pratisthan, Lord Shiva Temple at Umaid Park and Shiksha Prachar Sangh.

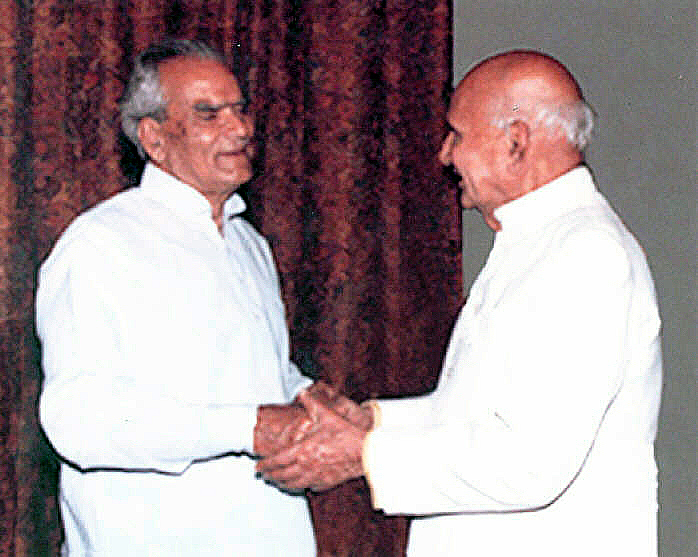
The two old friends together, Vice President of India Shri Bhairon Singh Shekhawat and Justice Shri Kan Singh Parihar at his residence in Jodhpur 2003.

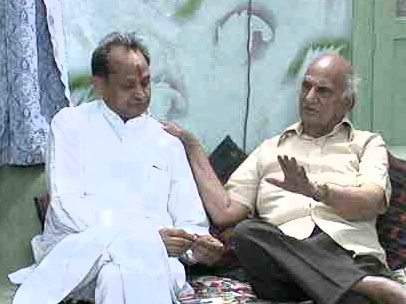
Shri Ashok Gehlot, Chief Minister, Rajasthan visiting Shri Kan Singh Parihar at his residence in Jodhpur.

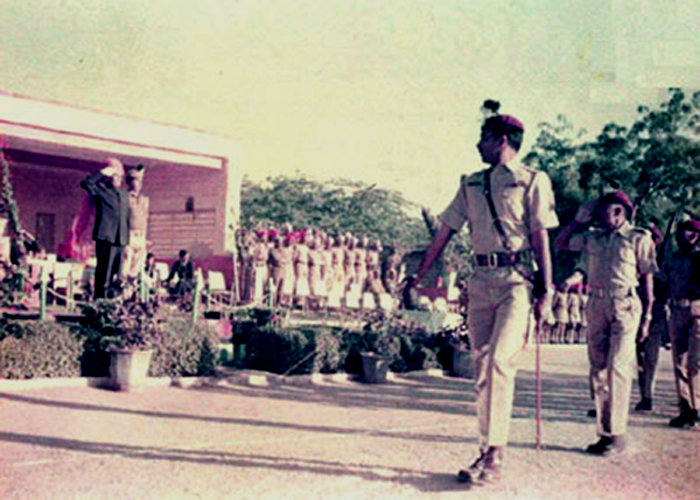
Hon'ble Mr. Justice Kan Singh Ji Parihar, taking Salute on Police Day Parade at Police Line, Jodhpur 1974.

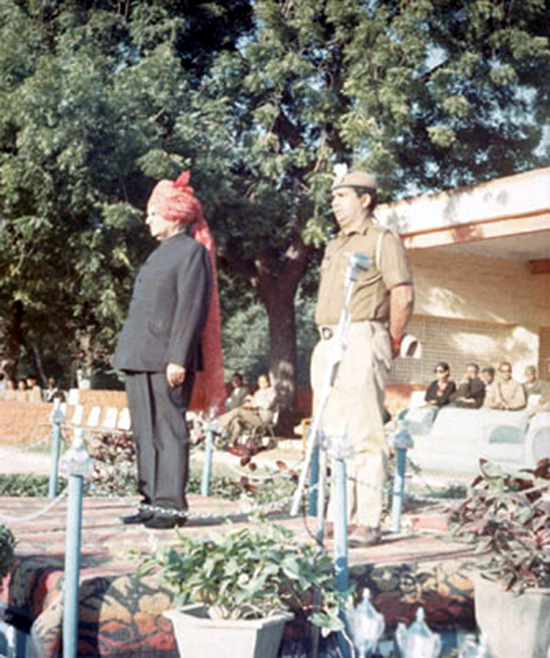
Hon'ble Mr. Justice Kan Singh Ji Parihar, taking Salute on Police Day Parade at Police Line, Jodhpur 1974.

Shri Kan Singh Ji Parihar Honoured with Haathi Saropaave (the highest honour of Marwar state) by Maharaja of Marwar Shri Gaj Singh Ji, Umaid Bhawan Palace, Jodhpur, 1990.

Lion Mr. Justice Kan Singh Parihar & Mrs. Parihar receiving great Lion Award at Burtonsville Lions Club, United States Nov. 1993.

In August 1989, the citizens of Jodhpur organised a grand felicitation function to honour Parihar for his lifelong achievements and exemplary services to the society. The function was presided over by Gaj Singh Ji Maharaja of Jodhpur. Dr. L. M. Singhvi, former high commissioner to the United Kingdom and a jurist, was the chief guest. Parihar was bestowed with a title of "Vidhi Ratnaker" (The Jewel of Law) and a commemoration volume was published in his honour. He was very fluent in English, Sanskrit, Hindi, Marwari and some other languages, but he was always advocating for Marwari (Rajasthani) language since 1950.
