= Shergarh tehsil =

Coordinates: 26°21′N 72°18′E

Shergarh tehsil शेरगढ़ तहसील
- Tehsil
- Shergarh tehsil
- Shergarh tehsil in Jodhpur Rural district
- Country: India
- State: Rajasthan
- District: Jodhpur District
- Headquarters: Shergarh

Shergarh tehsil is a tehsil in Jodhpur District of Rajasthan state in western India. The headquarters for the tehsil is the village of Shergarh.

Shergarh tehsil is a western tehsil among the eleven tehsils in Jodhpur District. It borders Phalodi tehsil to the north, Balesar tehsil to the east, Barmer District to the south and southwest, and Jaisalmer District to the west.

== History ==
In 2009 Shergarh tehsil was divided, with the eastern half becoming Balesar tehsil, before that Balesar had been a subtehsil within Shergarh, even though it had had a separate panchayat samiti.

== Villages ==
There are thirty-three panchayat villages in Shergarh tehsil.

- Bhandu Jati
- Bhomsagar
- Bhoongra
- Budkiya
- Chaba
- Chandsama
- Chordiya
- Chutarpura
- Dasaniya
- Dechu (Dechoo)
- Devrajgarh
- Gada
- Guman Singh Pura
- Gumanpura
- Himmatpura
- Jethaniya
- Jetsar
- Kalau
- Khirja Khas
- Khirja Tibna
- Pabusar
- Poongaliya
- Raisar
- Sabarsar
- Sai
- Setrawa (Shaitrawa)
- Shergarh
- Siyanada
- Sointara
- Solankiya Tala
- Somesar
- Suwaliya
- Tena
- Utwalia
