= Setrawa =

- tahsil
- Location in Rajasthan, India Setrawa (India)
- Coordinates: 26°37′0″N 72°20′0″E
- Country: India
- State: Rajasthan
- District: Phalodi district
- Tahsil: Setrawa
  - Rank: 1
- Elevation: 273 m (896 ft)

Population (2011)
  - Total: 5,000

Languages
  - Official: Marwadi
- Time zone: UTC+5:30 (IST)
- Postal code: 342025
- ISO 3166 code: RJ-IN
- Vehicle registration: RJ19
- Coastline: 0 kilometres (0 mi)

Setrawa tahsil is located in Phalodi district. It dates back to 14th century. Jodha, the founder of Jodhpur has roots from Setrawa. panchayat village in Setrawa Tehsil, Jodhpur District, Rajasthan, western India. It is known for its Warriors and it is a nursery for the Indian Army and the BSF.

There are three villages in the Setrawa gram panchayat: Setrawa, Khanori and jaitsar .

== Geography ==
National Highway 114 and mega highway passes through Setrawa. The village is at an elevation of 273m above mean sea level.

== Demographics ==
In the 2001 India census, the village of Setrawa reported 3,219 inhabitants with 1,788 (55.5%) being male and 1,431 (44.5%) being female, for a gender ratio of 800 females per thousand males.
