= Devendra Kachhawaha =

Judge of Rajasthan High Court

Hon'ble Justice Devendra Kachhawaha

Judge of Rajasthan High Court
- In office 6 March 2020 – 2 May 2022
- Nominated by: Sharad Arvind Bobde
- Appointed by: Ram Nath Kovind

Personal details
- Born: 3 May 1960 (age 66) Jodhpur, Rajasthan
- Parent: Late Advocate Banshilal Kachhwaha Late Vidyawati Kachhwaha

Justice Devendra Kachhawaha (born 3 May 1960) is a former judge of Rajasthan High Court. He was the judge of the Rajasthan High Court till his superannuation in 2022. Presently, he is the Chairman of State Consumer Disputes Redressal Commission for the State of Rajasthan. Earlier he has served as a District and Session Judge of various District and Session courts in Rajasthan.

An order elevating 6 judicial officers as judges of Rajasthan High Court was issued on 4 March 2020 in this regard. All the six judges so elevated were sworn in by Chief Justice Indrajit Mahanty on 6 March 2020. He is known as an extraordinary judge for his judicial mind and imparting justice in the society.
