= Dechu =

- Tehsil
- Location in Rajasthan, India Dechu (India)
- Coordinates: 26°46′29″N 72°19′50″E
- Country: India
- State: Rajasthan
- District: Phalodi
- Tehsil: Dechu Tehsil
- Time zone: UTC+05:30 (IST)
- PIN: 342314

Dechu is a village in Phalodi district of the Indian state of Rajasthan.
