= Balesar tehsil =

Coordinates: 26°23′N 72°30′E

- Tehsil
- Balesar tehsil
- Interactive map of Balesar tehsil
- Location in Rajasthan, India Balesar tehsil (India)
- Country: India
- State: Rajasthan
- District: Jodhpur District
- Seat: Balesar

Balesar tehsil is a tehsil in Jodhpur District of Rajasthan state in western India. Headquarters for the tehsil is the village of Balesar.

Balesar tehsil is a central tehsil among the eleven tehsils in Jodhpur District. It borders Phalodi tehsil to the north, Osian tehsil and Mandor tehsil to the east, Luni tehsil to the southeast, Barmer District to the southwest and Sekhala tehsil to the west.

== History ==
In 2009 Balesar tehsil was created out of the eastern half of Shergarh tehsil, before that Balesar had been a subtehsil with a separate panchayat samiti, sometimes referred to as ILRC Balesar.

== Villages ==
There are thirty-three panchayat villages in Balesar tehsil.

- Agolai
- Balesar Durgawatan
- Balesar Sattan
- Bastawa
- Bawarli
- Belwa
- Belwa Ranaji
- Bhatelai Purohitan
- Birai
- Bisariya
- Hapasar
- Dhadhaniya Bhaila
- Dhandhaniya Sasan
- Dugar
- Gopalsar
- Khari Beri
- Khudiyala
- Kui Inda
- Nimbo Ka Gaon
- Utamber
