= Balesar =

Balesar Satan Balesar, Balesar Sattan
- town
- Interactive map of Balesar Satan
- Coordinates: 26°23′35″N 72°29′40″E
- Country: India
- State: Rajasthan
- District: Jodhpur
- Tehsil: Balesar
- Elevation: 230 m (750 ft)

Population (2001)
  - Total: 9,552

Languages
- Time zone: UTC+5:30 (IST)
- PIN: 342023
- ISO 3166 code: RJ-IN
- Vehicle registration: RJ-19

Balesar Satan is a village in Jodhpur district, Rajasthan, India. It is a panchayat village and headquarters of the Balesar tehsil.

== Geography ==
Balesar is located in the Thar Desert at an elevation of 230 meters above mean sea level. The village is on National Highway 125 between Jodhpur and Jaisalmer.

== Demographics ==
In the 2001 India census, the village of Balesar Satan reported 70,000 inhabitants with 5,087 (%) being male and 4,465 (%) being female, for a gender ratio of 920 females per thousand males.
