= Jodhpur district =

- District of Rajasthan
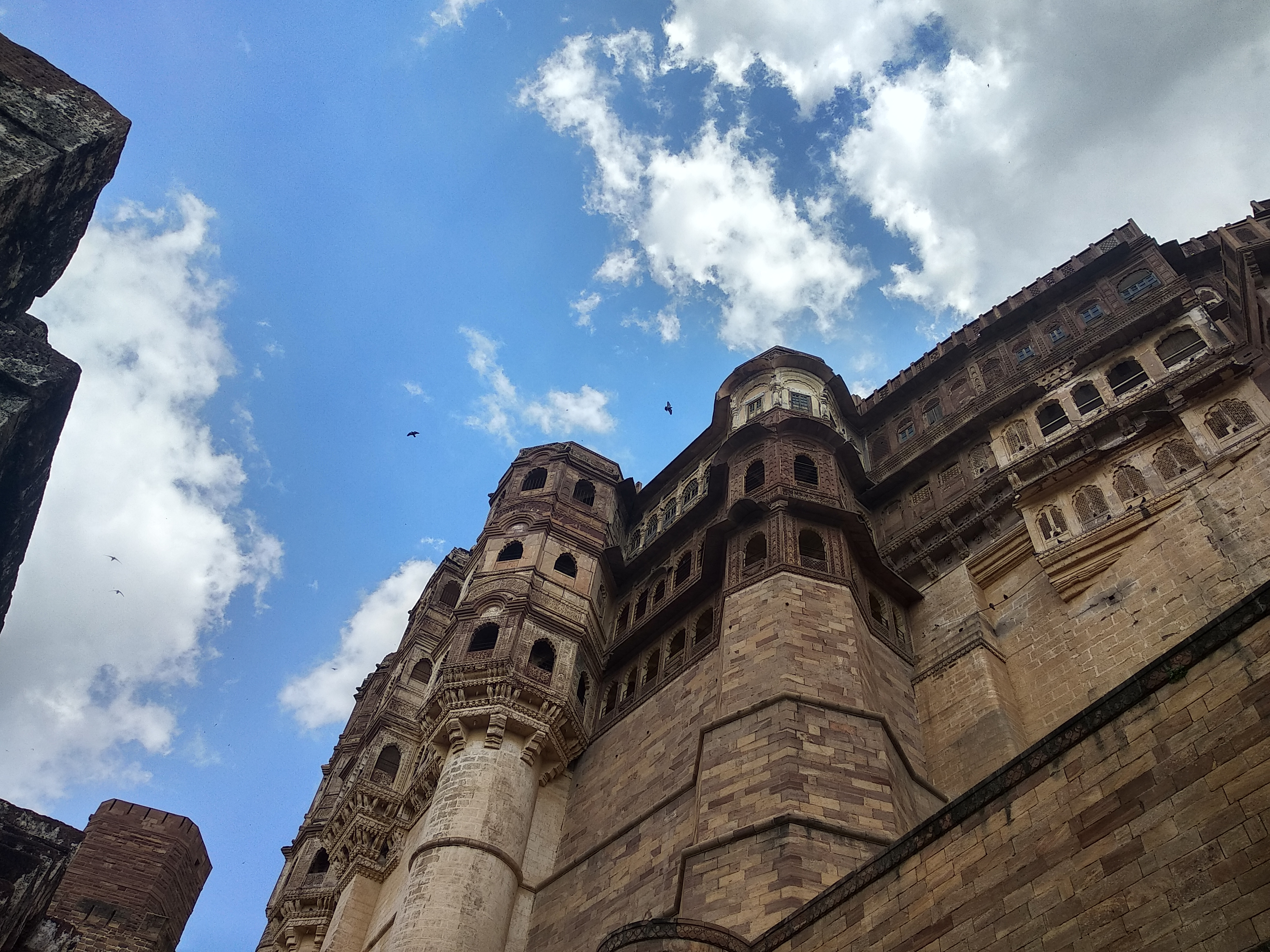
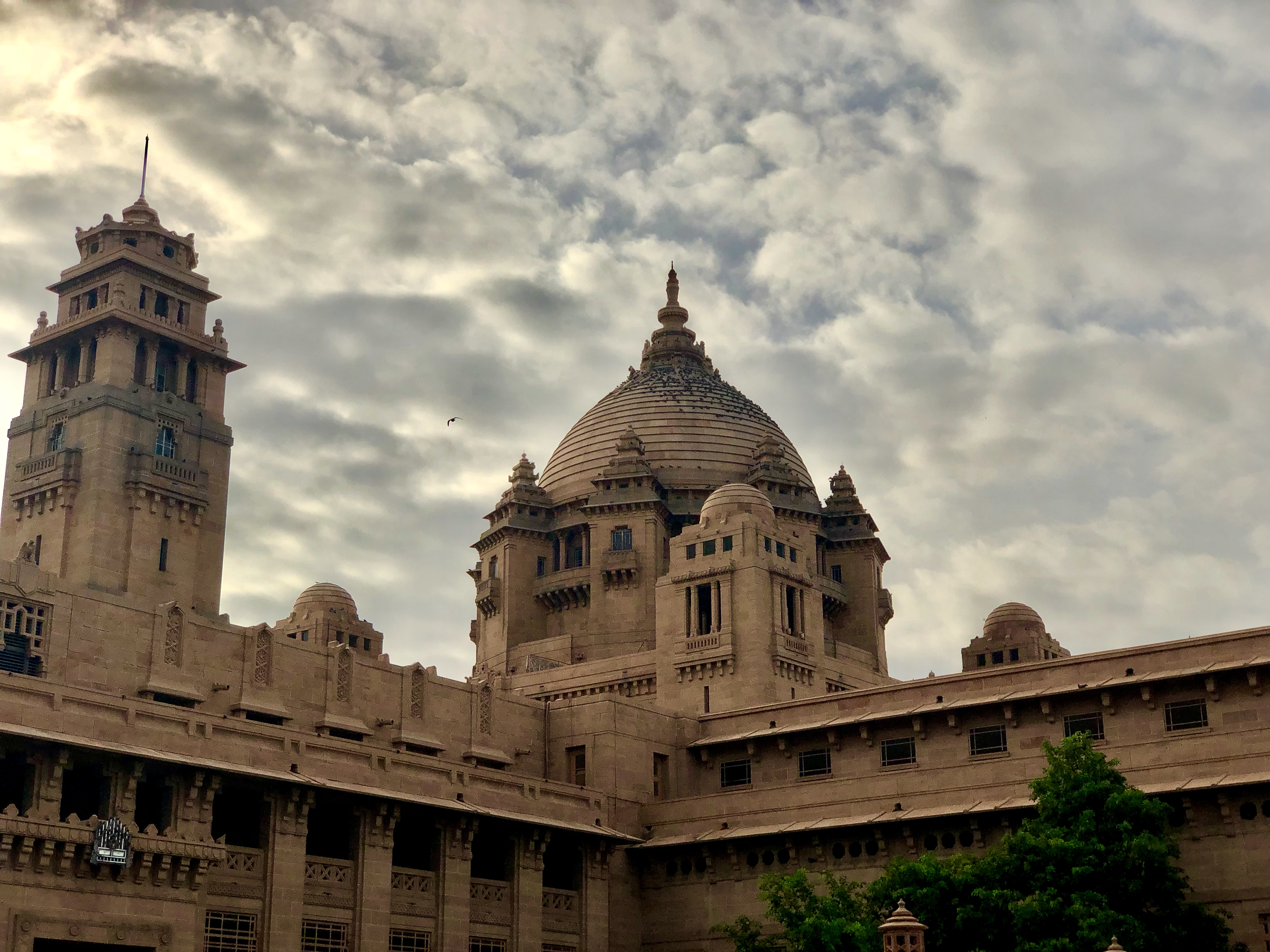
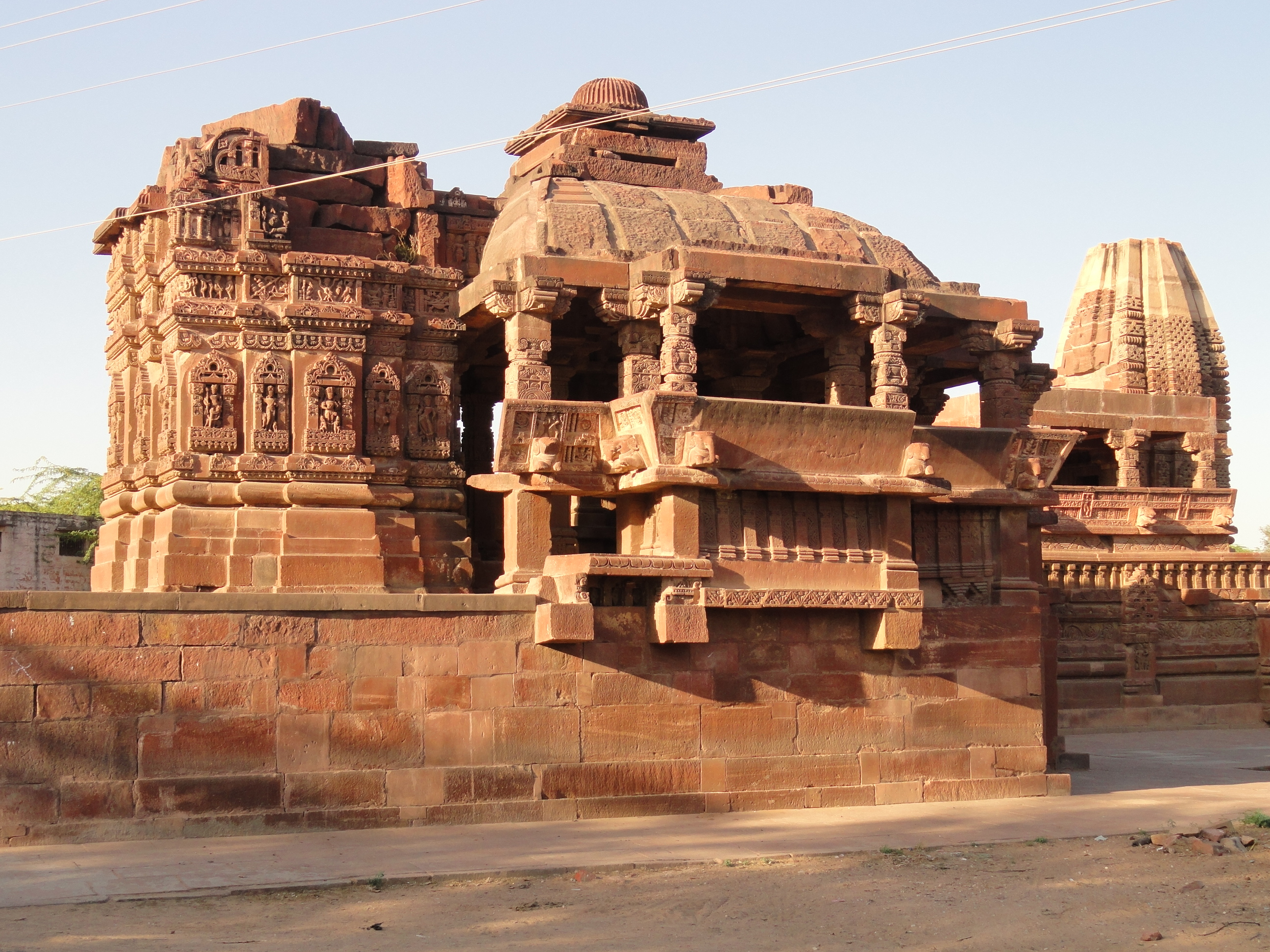
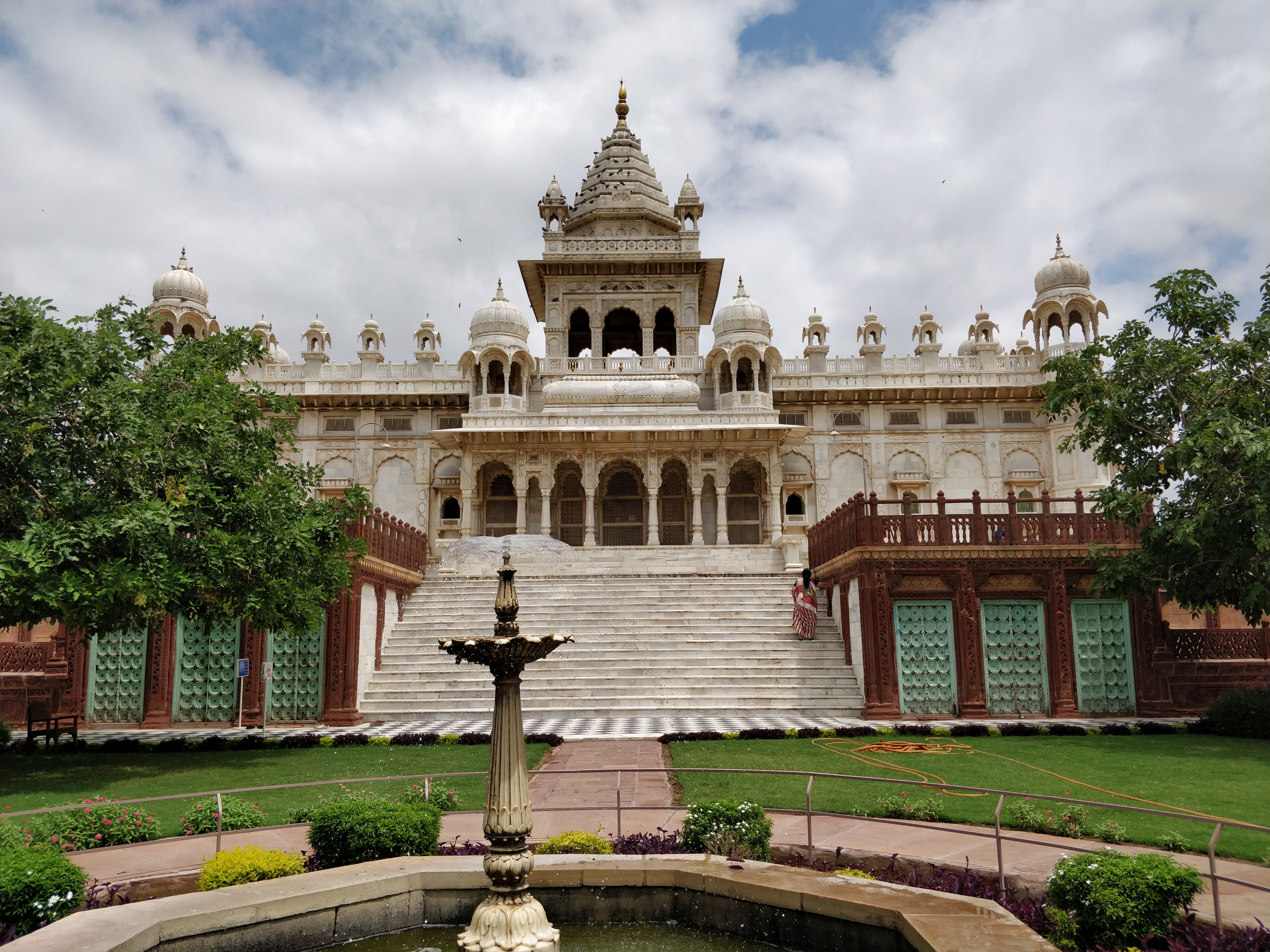
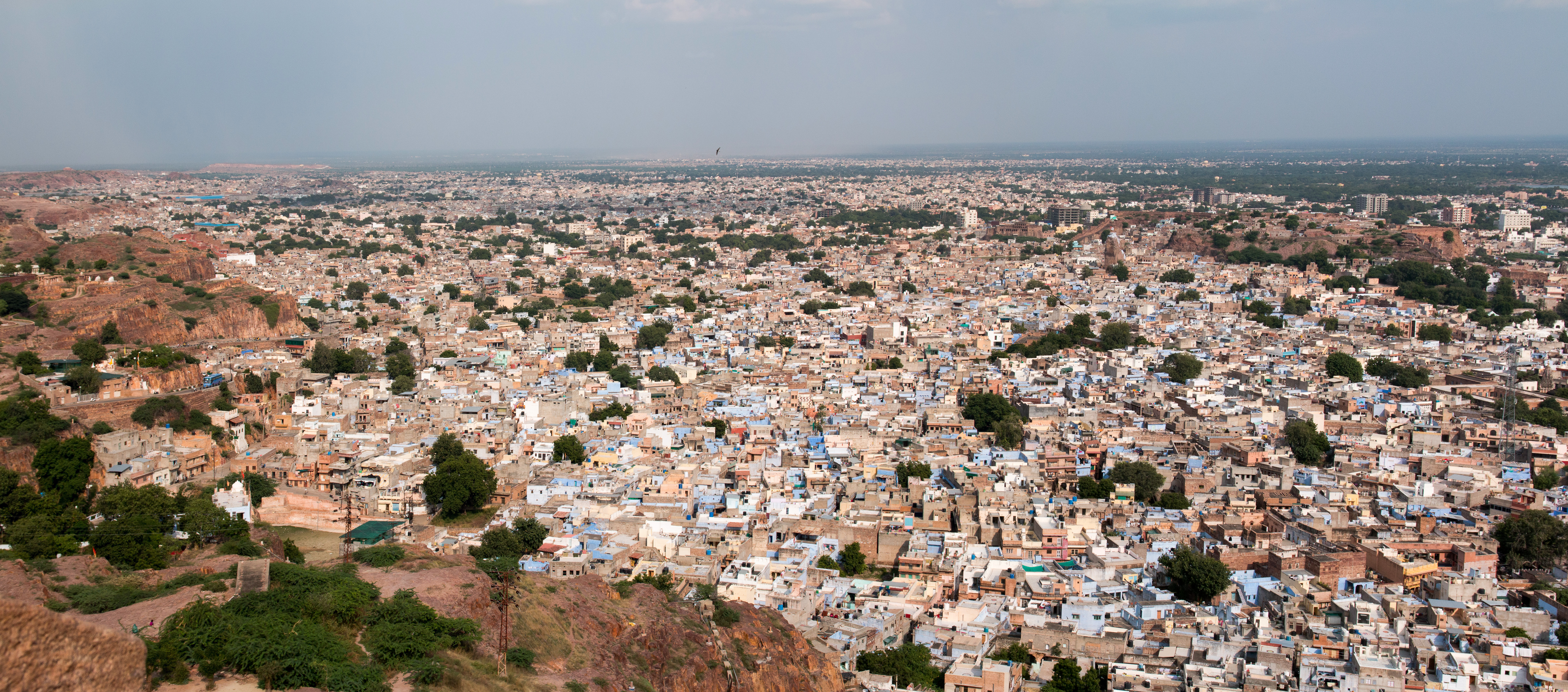
- Clockwise from top-left: Meherangarh Fort, Umaid Bhawan Palace, Jaswant Thada, View of Jodhpur skyline, Osiyan Mata Temple in Osiyan
- Interactive map of Jodhpur district
- Coordinates (Jodhpur): 27.62°N 72.92°E - 26.00°N 73.87°E
- Country: India
- State: Rajasthan
- Division: Jodhpur
- Headquarters: Jodhpur
- Tehsils: Jodhpur, Balesar, Baori, Bhopalgarh, Bilara, Chamu, Jhawar, Kudi Bhagtasni, Luni, Osian, Pipar City, Sekhala, Shergarh, Tinwari

Government
  - Divisional Commissioner: Bhanwar Lal Mehra, IAS
  - District Collector & Magistrate: Alok Ranjan, IAS
  - Commissioner of Police: Sharat Kaviraj, IPS

Area
  - Total: 22,850 km^{2} (8,820 sq mi)

Population (2011)
  - Total: 3,687,165
  - Density: 161.4/km^{2} (417.9/sq mi)
  - Urban: 34.30 percent

Demographics
  - Literacy: 65.94
  - Sex ratio: 916
- Time zone: UTC+05:30 (IST)
- Website: jodhpur.rajasthan.gov.in

Jodhpur district (IPA: [ˈd͡ʒoːd̪ʱ.pʊɾ]) is a district in the State of Rajasthan in western India. The city of Jodhpur is the administrative headquarters of the district.

As of the 2011 census, it is the second highest populated district of Rajasthan (out of 33), after Jaipur district.

Jodhpur is the historic center of the Marwar region. The district contains Mandore, the ancient capital of the Pratihara Rajput kings (8th-13th centuries), and the Pratiharas' temple city of Osiyan. Jodhpur was founded in the 15th century by Rao Jodha, and served as the capital of the kingdom of Marwar under the Rathore dynasty until after Indian Independence in 1947.

== Geography ==
The district is located in the State of Rajasthan in western India. The district is bounded on the north by Bikaner District, on the northeast by Nagaur District, on the southeast and south by Pali District, on the southwest by Barmer District, and on the west and northwest by Jaisalmer District. The district stretches between 26 00’ and 27 37’ north latitude and between 72 55’ and 73 52’ east longitude. This district is situated at an altitude between 250 and 300 meters above sea level.

Jodhpur district comprises three distinct physiography units, the alluvial plains, sand dunes and escarpments. The western and north-western parts of Jodhpur district are characterised by sand dunes. With exception of some parts of Bilara and Osian tehsil, land surface of the district is nearly flat and sandy. Luni is the only important river in the district, it enters Jodhpur district near Bilara and flows for a distance of over 75 km. before entering in Barmer district.

== Economy ==
=== Tourism ===
Jodhpur is famous for its rich history. It is also referred to as the Blue City and "Sun City". Blue City is derived due to the blue tinge to the whitewashed houses around the Mehrangarh Fort. Other notable places of interest are the Umaid Bhawan Palace which a portion currently serves as the residence of the current Maharaja Gaj Singh's family and the remaining portion is a 5 star hotel under the Taj Group of Hotels.

== Divisions ==
In the 2001 census, there were five sub-divisions in the district and seven tehsils. For ease of administration, there were four sub-tehsils (Upa-tehsils): Balesar, Bap, Jhanwar and Tinwari. Balesar and Bap has local councils (panchayat samiti).

As of 2011, there were seven sub-divisions in the district and eleven tehsils. In addition to these, there were two independent sub-tehsils (Upa-tehsils): Jhanwar and Tinwari.

Divisions of Jodhpur District
Subdivision	Subdivision Headquarters	Tehsil	Tehsil Headquarters	Panchayat Villages
Jodhpur; Subdivision	Jodhpur	Jodhpur Tehsil	Jodhpur	0
Bhopalgarh; Subdivision	Bhopalgarh	Bhopalgarh Tehsil	Bhopalgarh	39
Bhopalgarh; Subdivision	Bhopalgarh	Bawadi Tehsil	Baori	26
Luni; Subdivision	Luni	Luni Tehsil	Luni	41
Osian; Subdivision	Osian	Osian Tehsil	Osian	29
Osian; Subdivision	Osian	Tinwari Tehsil	Tinwari	26
Bilara	Bilara	Bilara	Bilara	40
Shergarh; Subdivision	Shergarh	Shergarh Tehsil	Shergarh	33
Shergarh; Subdivision	Shergarh	Balesar Tehsil	Balesar	33

All tehsils are development blocks and have panchayat samities, except Jodhpur which is an urban agglomeration governed as a Municipal Corporation. The town of Bilara governed by Municipal Councils. There are 1,794 villages under 351 Gram Panchayats.

=== Villages ===
- Baru
- Budkiya
- Chaukhan
- Lolawas

== Demographics ==
Religions in Jodhpur district (2011)
Religion	Percent
Hinduism	87.45%
Islam	11.16%
Jainism	1.00%
Other or not stated	0.39%

According to the 2011 census Jodhpur district has a population of 3,687,165, roughly equal to the nation of Liberia or the US state of Oklahoma. This gives it a ranking of 73rd in India (out of a total of 640). The district has a population density of 161 inhabitants per square kilometre (420/sq mi). Its population growth rate over the decade 2001-2011 was 27.69%. Jodhpur has a sex ratio of 915 females for every 1000 males, and a literacy rate of 67.09%. 34.30% of the population lives in urban areas. Scheduled Castes and Scheduled Tribes make up 16.49% and 3.23% of the population respectively.

=== Languages ===
Languages in Jodhpur district (2011)
1. Rajasthani (80.2%)
2. Marwari (8.87%)
3. Hindi (8.61%)
4. Others (2.30%)

At the time of the 2011 census, 80.22% of the population spoke Rajasthani, 8.87% Marwari and 8.61% Hindi as their first language.

== Notable people ==
- Narayan Singh Bhati
- Jaswant Singh Bishnoi
- Vijaydan Detha, writer and folklorist. Born in Borunda (Bilara tahsil).
- Ashok Gehlot (born 1951) 12th CM of Rajasthan.
- Mehdi Hassan (1927–2012) Pakistani Ghazal Singer
- Justice Devendra Kachhawaha, Judge, Rajasthan High Court, Jodhpur
- Barkatullah Khan (1920–73) Politician. Born in Jodhpur
- Gajendra Singh Khimsar
- Shailesh Lodha, Indian poet, actor, comedian and writer
- Parasram Maderna (1926–2014) Politician and Jat leader
- Sheo Dan Mal
- Narayan Singh Manaklao (born 1942) Social worker.
- Mathura Das Mathur
- Kamsa Meghwal
- Narayan Lal Panchariya
- Justice Kan Singh Parihar, (1913–2011), Judge of Rajasthan High Court and Vice Chancellor of Jodhpur University.
- Gajendra Singh Shekhawat, politician.
- Chitrangada Singh (born 1976) Bollywood Actress
- Abhishek Singhvi, lawyer and politician
- Om Thanvi (born 1957) Writer and editor. Born in Phalodi
- Ashwini Vaishnaw, Politician, former IAS officer & currently the Minister of Railways, Communications and Electronics & IT
- Jai Narayan Vyas (1899–1963) 3rd CM of Rajasthan.

== See also ==
- Central Arid Zone Research Institute
- Arid Forest Research Institute
