= List of films shot in Rajasthan =

The Indian state of Rajasthan has often been used as a site for filming movies and TV serials. The state has served as the backdrop for many Indian as well as foreign movies.

== List ==
Famous films shot in Rajasthan include:

- Adimai Penn (MGR's Tamil film 1968)
- Veera Pandia Kattan Bomman (Sivaji Ganesan's Tamil Film - 1959)
- Kaanchli Life in a Slough (2020) at Jhadol, Udaipur
- Dhanak at Jaisalmer
- Agent Sai Srinivasa Athreya at Bidasar, Rajasthan
- Mard, at Jaigarh Fort And Bamanwas, Sawai Madhopur
- Anamika at Gajner Palace, Bikaner
- Autobiography of a Princess, at Jodhpur
- Bade Miyan Chote Miyan, at City Palace, Jaipur
- Bajrangi Bhaijaan, at Mandawa, Jhunjhunu
- Bajirao Mastani, at Amer Palace, Jaipur
- Badrinath Ki Dulhania, at Kota
- The Best Exotic Marigold Hotel
- Bol Bachchan, at Chomu Palace, Jaipur, Rajasthan
- Border
- Chalo Dilli, at Jhunjhunu
- Chaar Din Ki Chandni, at Khimsar, (at Jaipur)
- Chor Machaaye Shor, at Mubarak Mahal, Jaipur
- The Darjeeling Limited, at Jodhpur
- Das Wilde Leben, at Jaipur
- The Deceivers
- Delhi 6, at Sambhar, Jaipur
- Dor
- Ek Paheli Leela, at Jodhpur, Nagaur and Bikaner
- Eklavya: The Royal Guard
- The Fall, at Jaipur and Jodhpur
- The Far Pavilions
- Gadar: Ek Prem Katha
- Ghulami, at Fatehpur, Rajasthan and Jhunjhunu
- Goliyon Ki Raasleela Ram-Leela, at Udaipur
- Guide, at Udaipur, Chittorgarh
- Dhanak at Jaisalmer
- Gulaal at Jaipur
- Goopy Gyne Bagha Byne at Jaisalmer
- Highway, at Bikaner
- Holy Smoke!, at Jaipur
- Hum Dil De Chuke Sanam, at Bada Bagh, Jaisalmer
- Hum Saath-Saath Hain: We Stand United, at Jodhpur
- Humraaz (Bobby Deol), at Jaigadh Fort, Jaipur
- I Am Kalam, at Bikaner
- Jai Ho Beimaan Ki, at Udaipur
- Jab We Met, at Mandawa
- The Jewel in the Crown, at Udaipur
- Jodhaa Akbar
- Jhinder Bondi at Udaipur
- The Jungle Book (1994), at Mehrangarh Fort
- Kaalo, at Jodhpur, Jaisalmer
- Karan Arjun, at Sariska Palace, Alwar
- Khoobsurat (Sonam Kapoor), at Laxmi Niwas, Bikaner
- Lamhe, at Kanak Vrindavan and Shishodia Garden, Jaipur
- Lekin
- Main Tulsi Tere Aangan Ki, at Udaipur
- Manorama Six Feet Under at Jhunjhunu
- Meera
- Mera Saaya, at Udaipur
- Mimi, at Mandawa, Jhunjhunu
- Mughal-e-Azam, at Jaipur
- Namastey London, at Ajmer Dargah
- Nanhe Jaisalmer
- Nayak, at Junagarh, Bikaner
- Octopussy, at Udaipur
- Om-Dar-Ba-Dar, at Pushkar
- One Water
- Paheli, at Nawalagarh, Jhunjhunu
- Parmanu: The Story of Pokhran, at Pokhran, Jaisalmer
- Pinjar in Sri Ganganagar district
- PK, at Mandawa, Jhunjhunu
- Prem Ratan Dhan Payo, at Udaipur
- Rang De Basanti at Nahargarh Fort, Jaipur
- Road, Movie (2010), at Jaisalmer
- Rudaali
- Saajan Chale Sasural, at Sariska Palace
- Shakespeare Wallah, at City Palace, Alwar
- Shakti: The Power, Kkhejadala Fort, Jodhpur
- Sher, at Jaipur, Rajasthan
- Siddhartha, at Deeg, Shri Mahaveer Ji
- Soldier
- Sonar Kella, at Jaisalmer
- Sooper Se Ooper, at Mandawa, Jhunjhunu
- Shuddh Desi Romance, at Jodhpur, Mehrangarh Fort, Johari Bazar, Jaipur
- Sultnat
- Trishna, at Jaipur
- Veer, at Jodhpur, Jaipur
- Yaadein, at Udaipur
- Yeh Jawaani Hai Deewani, at Bagore-ki-Haveli
- Beta, at Kanak Vrindavan, Jaipur
- Sabse Bada Khiladi, at Birla Mandir, Jaipur
- Lal Badshah, at Jaipur
- Mrityudata Gaurav Towers, Jaipur
- Bhool Bhulaiya, at Chomu Palace, Jaipur, Rajasthan
- Zubeida, at Narain Niwas Palace, Jaipur
- Taawdo The Sunlight (Rajasthani Film), at Bikaner
- Baadshaho, at Bikaner
- Saheb, Biwi Aur Gangster 3, at Bikaner
- Firangi, at Bikaner
- Koi Laut Ke Aaya Hai, at Bikaner
- Manikarnika: The Queen of Jhansi, at Bikaner
- Qarib Qarib Single, at Bikaner
- The Dark Knight Rises, at Mehrangarh, Jodhpur
- The Eken: Ruddhaswas Rajasthan, at Jodhpur, Jaisalmer and Kuldhara
- Nuchwana, at Lordi Daijagra

== See also ==
- Tourism in Rajasthan
- List of attractions in Jaipur
- Palace on Wheels
- Tourist Attractions in Udaipur
