= Jajiwal railway station =

Railway station in Rajasthan, India

Jajiwal

General information
- Location: Jajiwal, Jodhpur, Jodhpur district, Rajasthan; India
- Coordinates: 26.368058°N 73.222828°E
- Elevation: 228 metres (748 ft)
- System: Indian Railways station
- Owner: Indian Railways
- Operator: North Western Railway
- Line: Jodhpur–Bathinda line
- Platforms: 1
- Tracks: Double Electric-Line

Construction
- Structure type: Standard (on-ground station)

Other information
- Status: Functioning
- Station code: JWL
- Zone(s): North Western Railway
- Division(s): Jodhpur

Services
Preceding station	Indian Railways	Following station
Banar towards ?	North Western Railway zone Jodhpur–Bathinda line	Asaranada towards ?
Location
- Interactive map

Jajiwal railway station is a railway station located on the Jodhpur–Bathinda railway line operated by the North Western Railway zone under Jodhpur railway division. It is situated at Jajiwal, Jodhpur in Jodhpur district in the Indian state of Rajasthan.
