= Sathin Road railway station =

Railway station in Rajasthan, India

Sathin Road

General information
- Location: Umed, Jodhpur district, Rajasthan; India
- Coordinates: 26.48978°N 73.509748°E
- Elevation: 284 metres (932 ft)
- System: Indian Railways station
- Owner: Indian Railways
- Operator: North Western Railway
- Line: Jodhpur–Bathinda line
- Platforms: 1
- Tracks: Double Electric-Line

Construction
- Structure type: Standard (on-ground station)

Other information
- Status: Functioning
- Station code: SWF
- Zone(s): North Western Railway
- Division(s): Jodhpur

Services
Preceding station	Indian Railways	Following station
Pipar Road Junction towards ?	North Western Railway zone Jodhpur–Bathinda line	Umed towards ?
Location
- Interactive map

Sathin Road railway station is a railway station located on the Jodhpur–Bathinda railway line operated by the North Western Railway zone under Jodhpur railway division. It is situated at Umed in Jodhpur district in the Indian state of Rajasthan.
