= Kheri Salwa railway station =

Railway station in Rajasthan, India

Kheri Salwa

General information
- Location: Kheri Salwa, Bhopalgarh Tehsil, Jodhpur district, Rajasthan; India
- Coordinates: 26.428511°N 73.390754°E
- Elevation: 259 metres (850 ft)
- System: Indian Railways station
- Owner: Indian Railways
- Operator: North Western Railway
- Line: Jodhpur–Bathinda line
- Platforms: 1
- Tracks: Double Electric-Line

Construction
- Structure type: Standard (on-ground station)

Other information
- Status: Functioning
- Station code: KSW
- Zone(s): North Western Railway
- Division(s): Jodhpur

Services
Preceding station	Indian Railways	Following station
Asaranada towards ?	North Western Railway zone Jodhpur–Bathinda line	Pipar Road Junction towards ?
Location
- Interactive map

Kheri Salwa railway station is a railway station located on the Jodhpur–Bathinda railway line operated by the North Western Railway zone under Jodhpur railway division. It is situated at Kheri Salwa, Bhopalgarh Tehsil in Jodhpur district in the Indian state of Rajasthan.
