= Banad railway station =

Railway station in Rajasthan, India

General information
- Location: SH 63, Banad, Rajasthan; India
- Coordinates: 26.3395°N 73.1470°E
- Elevation: 213 metres (699 ft)
- System: Indian Railways station
- Owner: Indian Railways
- Operator: North Western Railway
- Line: Jodhpur–Bathinda line
- Platforms: 3
- Tracks: 4
- Connections: Auto stand

Construction
- Structure type: Standard (on-ground station)
- Parking: No
- Cycle facilities: No

Other information
- Status: Functioning
- Station code: BNO
- Zone(s): North Western Railway
- Division(s): Jodhpur
Location

Banad railway station is a main railway station in Jodhpur district, Rajasthan. Its code is BNO. The station serves Banad town and consists of a single platform. The platform is not well sheltered and lacks many facilities including water and sanitation. It is located approximately 14 km from Jodhpur railway station. The railway station is under the administrative control of North Western Railway of Indian Railways.

== Major trains ==
Some of the important trains that run from Banad are:

- Jodhpur–Rewari Passenger
- Jodhpur–Bilara Passenger
- Jodhpur–Bhopal Passenger
- Jodhpur–Hisar DEMU
- Abohar–Jodhpur Passenger
