= Asaranada railway station =

Railway station in Rajasthan, India

Asaranada

General information
- Location: State Highway 58, Asranada, Jodhpur district, Rajasthan; India
- Coordinates: 26.397374°N 73.305325°E
- Elevation: 251 metres (823 ft)
- System: Indian Railways station
- Owner: Indian Railways
- Operator: North Western Railway
- Line: Jodhpur–Bathinda line
- Platforms: 1
- Tracks: Double Electric-Line

Construction
- Structure type: Standard (on-ground station)

Other information
- Status: Functioning
- Station code: AAS
- Zone(s): North Western Railway
- Division(s): Jodhpur

Services
Preceding station	Indian Railways	Following station
Jajiwal towards ?	North Western Railway zone Jodhpur–Bathinda line	Kheri Salwa towards ?
Location
- Interactive map

Asaranada railway station is a railway station located on the Jodhpur–Bathinda railway line operated by the North Western Railway zone under Jodhpur railway division. It is situated beside State Highway 58, at Asranada in Jodhpur district in the Indian state of Rajasthan.
