= Dhinga Gavar =

Festival celebrated in Jodhpur, India

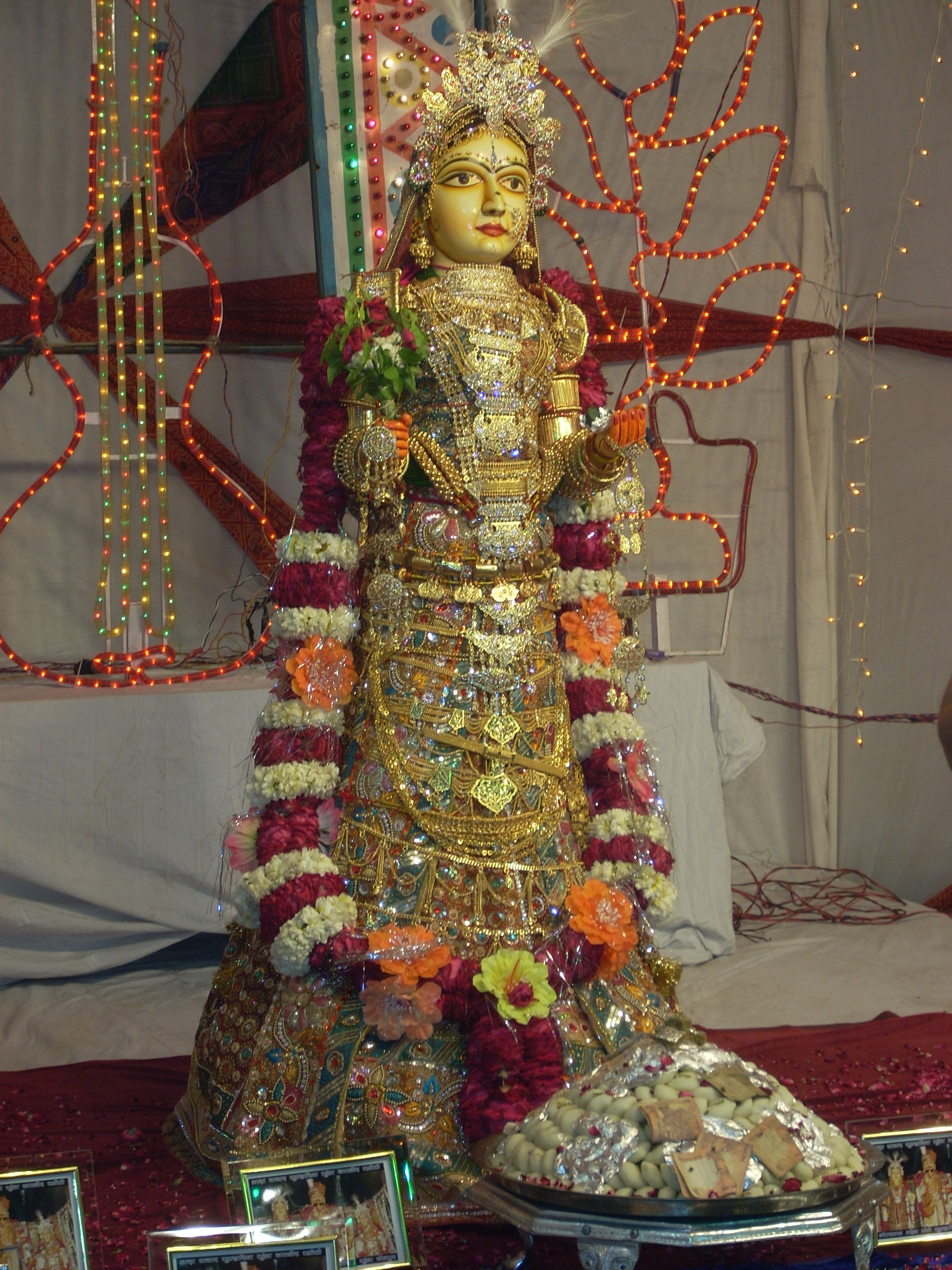
Dhinga Gavar

Dhinga Gavar is a festival celebrated in Jodhpur, in Western Rajasthan in India. "Dhinga" literally means "fun by deception"; Gavar, also known as Gangaur, is the consort of Shiva. The festival of Gangaur is celebrated throughout India, but that of Dhinga Gavar is celebrated only in Jodhpur.

== Folk Deity ==
Dhinga Gavar is a folk deity, the humorous side of Shiva's consort Gangaur.

== Time and Location ==
The festival of Ganguar starts from the next day of the spring festival Holi, which falls on the full-moon day of the month Phagun of the Hindu calendar. Ganguar is worshipped mainly by newly-wed brides, unmarried girls, and married women. Every day, they dress in traditional ceremonial Rajasthan costume and worship clay or wood statues of Isar (Shiva) and his consort Gangaur (Parvati), beseeching them for marital bliss. The festival ends on the following third day of no moon (amawas) of month chaitra. Thus, the celebration lasts for sixteen days because of a shortfall in tithi which is common in the lunar calendar. On this final day of the festival, a huge procession of well-decorated images of Ishar is taken through the main markets of cities; large crowds assemble in the streets to pray to them.

On this day, Teej in Jodhpur, one image of Ganaur without Isar, known as Dhinga Gavar, is established at 11 important streets (mohalla) within the old fort wall of Jodhpur. It is worshipped by all women: married, unmarried, and widows.

== Mythology ==
The legend is that Shiva once teased his consort Parvati by dressing up as a cobbler. In retaliation, Parvati also appeared as Bhil tribal women before Shiva to tease and have some fun out of it.

== Function ==
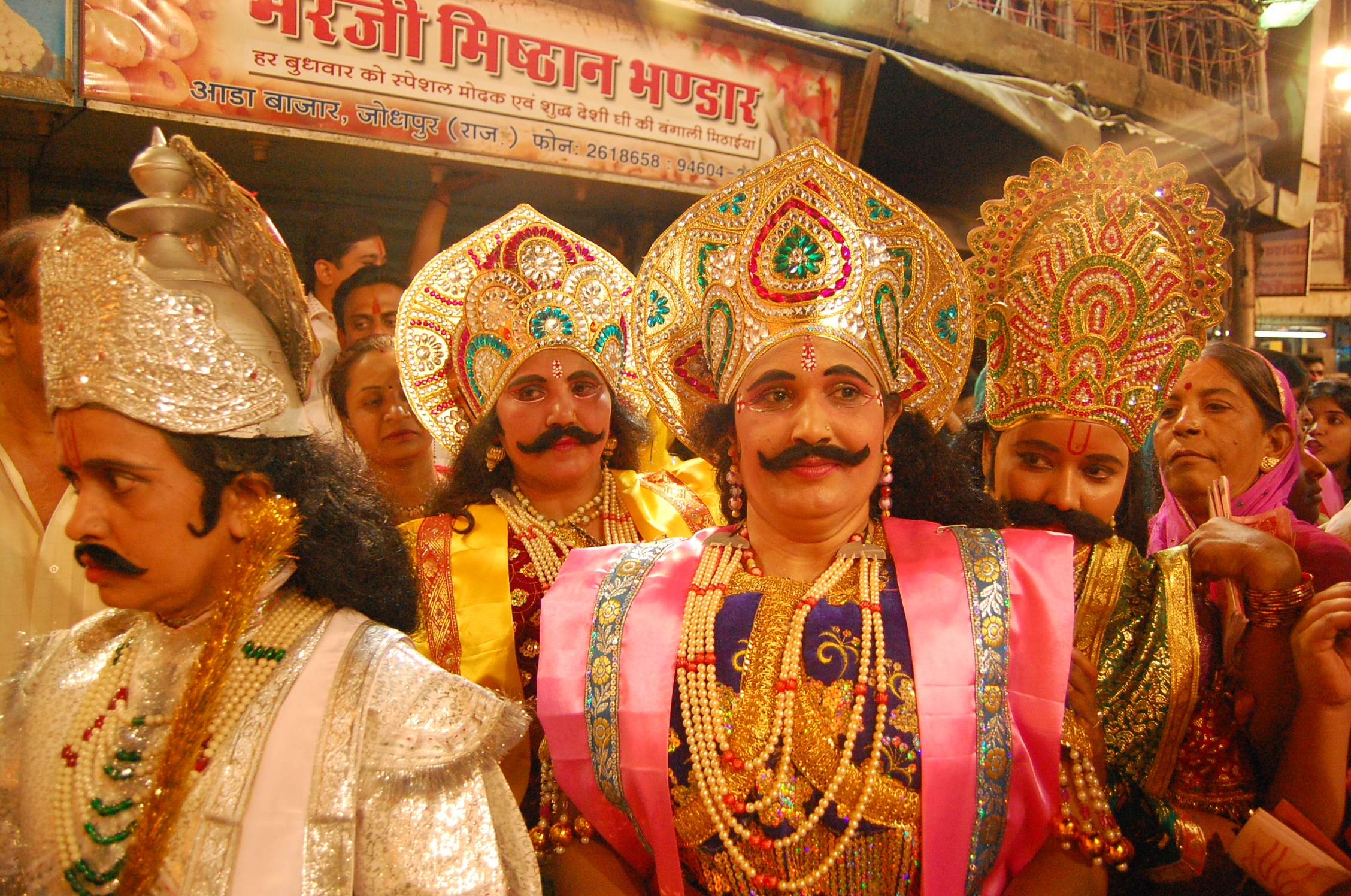
Women masquerading as Hindu Gods

The function of Dhinga Gavar starts after sunset when the statues of Dhinga Gavar are put on a dais at 11 important location of old Jodhpur city. Each statue is decorated in typical Rajasthan costume with gold jewellery of 5 kg to 30 kg. The offerings to Dhinga Gavar are made of cannabis and dry fruits powder and is known as "moi".

The women, most of whom are from Pushkarna Brahmin families dress up in fancy dress costume as various Hindu Gods and Hindu Goddess, police, saints, dacoit, tribal etc. and carry a stick in their hand. They patrol the narrow streets of Jodhpur city the whole night, protecting the statue of Dhinga Gavar.

It is a popular belief that any unmarried man who comes near these women and is stricken by the stick gets married soon to a suitable girl. Stick is called baint in Hindi so this festival is also known as Baintmar Teej.

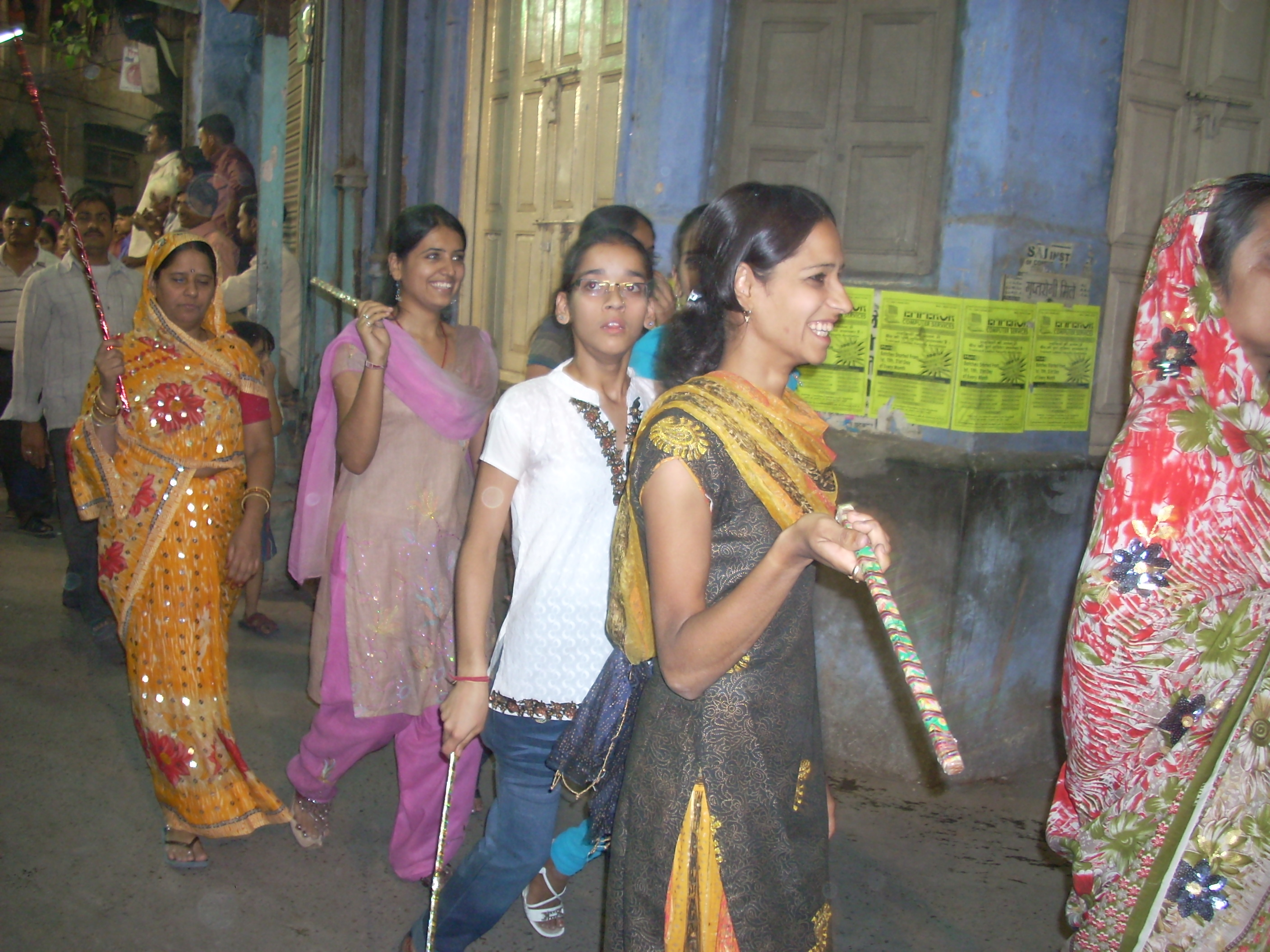
Girls happy for beating boys with sticks

== Teejania ==
The girls and women observing fast of Dhinga Gavar known as Teejania carrying sticks in their hands virtually rule the road on this night. Though enough police are deployed, little intervention is needed and the crowd finds its own equilibrium of discipline. Boys to get a "lucky strike" go near girls and sometimes tease them to get beaten up by decorated sticks.

This is the only festival which pretends to give equal rights to all kinds of women. In this festival even a widow can take part.
