= Jodhpur Cantt railway station =

Railway station in Rajasthan, India

General information
- Location: National Highway 112, Nandri, Jodhpur, Rajasthan; India
- Coordinates: 26.3128°N 73.0929°E
- Elevation: 220 metres (720 ft)
- System: Indian Railways station
- Owner: Indian Railways
- Operator: North Western Railway
- Line: Jodhpur–Bathinda line
- Platforms: 3
- Tracks: 4
- Connections: Auto stand

Construction
- Structure type: Standard (on-ground station)
- Parking: No
- Cycle facilities: No

Other information
- Status: Functioning
- Station code: JUCT
- Zone(s): North Western Railway
- Division(s): Jodhpur
Location

Jodhpur Cantt railway station is a railway station in Jodhpur district, Rajasthan. Its code is JUCT. It serves Jodhpur city. The station consists of 2 platform. The platform is not well sheltered. It is located approximately 8 km from Jodhpur railway station. The railway station is under the administrative control of North Western Railway of Indian Railways.1 platform is under construction

== Major trains ==
Some of the important trains that run from Jodhpur Cantt are:

- Bilara–Jodhpur Passenger
- Jodhpur–Bilara Passenger
