= Donald Field =

British Indian Army officer and colonial administrator

Lieutenant-Colonel Sir Donald Moyle Field CIE (19 November 1881 – 11 November 1956) was an officer of the British Indian Army and Indian Political Department who served as Chief Minister of the princely state of Jodhpur from 1935 to 1946, the last of the British Raj leaders of that area. Among the events of Field's ministry was the 1937 order formally granting the request of Mali community of Rajputana to be renamed as "Sainik Kshatriya" in official records.
