= Kharia Khangar railway station =

Railway station in Rajasthan, India

Kharia Khangar

General information
- Location: Kharia Khangar, Jodhpur district, Rajasthan; India
- Coordinates: 26.609843°N 73.686313°E
- Elevation: 315 metres (1,033 ft)
- System: Indian Railways station
- Owner: Indian Railways
- Operator: North Western Railway
- Line: Jodhpur–Bathinda line
- Platforms: 2
- Tracks: Double Electric-Line

Construction
- Structure type: Standard (on-ground station)

Other information
- Status: Functioning
- Station code: KXG
- Zone(s): North Western Railway
- Division(s): Jodhpur

Services
Preceding station	Indian Railways	Following station
Umed towards ?	North Western Railway zone Jodhpur–Bathinda line	Gotan towards ?
Location
- Interactive map

Kharia Khangar railway station is a railway station located on the Jodhpur–Bathinda railway line operated by the North Western Railway zone under Jodhpur railway division. It is situated at Kharia Khangar in Jodhpur district in the Indian state of Rajasthan.
