= Thakur Bakhtawar Singh =

Bakhtawar Singh

Inspector General of Police

Personal details
- Born: Kolu, Malani Rajputana, British India

Thakur Bakhtawar Singh (also known as IG Bakhtawar Singhji) was the Inspector General of Police of Jodhpur (1946–48) while the transition of the Jodhpur State from monarchy to democracy and Merger in the Republic of India. One of the most irrepressible officers of his time, he killed, suppressed or brought to book many dreaded dacoits during his service in the Police Department.

== Background ==
His family belonged to village Kolu in Barmer District.

== Career ==
He was trained initially at Phillaur Police Training School, Punjab and posted as an Inspector of Police in then Marwar in 1912. He was a pioneer in organising the Railway Police Branch in Jodhpur as a train used to run from Jodhpur to Hyderabad in Sindh province.

== Honours ==
He was awarded the King's Police Medal for Gallantry in 1929. In June 1946, the title of Rao Bahadur was conferred on him by Lord F.M.Wavell, Viceroy of India (1943–46).
