= Jodhpur Ring Road =

Road project in Rajasthan, India

Route information
- Maintained by National Highways Authority of India
- Length: 126.688 km (78.720 mi)

Location
- Country: India
- State: Rajasthan
- Major cities: Jodhpur

Highway system
- Roads in India; Expressways; National; State; Asian; State Highways in Rajasthan

The Jodhpur Ring Road is a road project aimed at connecting the highways surrounding the cities of Jaipur, Nagaur, Jaisalmer, Barmer and Pali in the state of Rajasthan, India.

== Construction ==
In January 2019, the Minister of Road Transport and Highways Nitin Gadkari and Minister of Water Resources, River Development and Ganga Rejuvenation Gajendra Singh Shekhawat laid the foundation stones for the Jodhpur Ring Road. Work stalled in January 2021 due to financial constraints. In September 2021, the NHAI invited bids for Package II of designed length of 30 km which was further awarded to OSS Construction in JV with Spetsdorstroy LLC. Work resumed in April 2022, with a new contractor for the first phase of 45 km; the tender for the second phase of 30 km was also awarded.
