= Ghanta Ghar (Jodhpur) =

Clock tower in Jodhpur, India

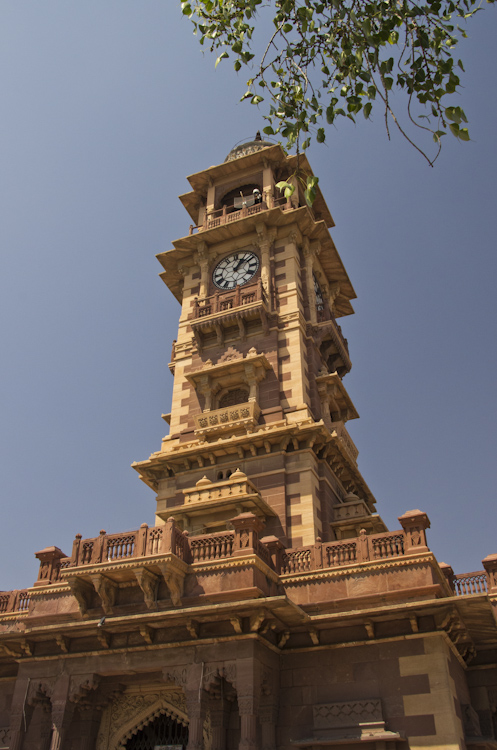
Ghanta Ghar

Ghanta Ghar, also known as the clock tower of Rajasthan, is in the Indian city of Jodhpur.

== History ==
Construction of Ghanta Ghar began in 1909 under the direction of Maharaja Sardar Singh, aiming to modernize Jodhpur by introducing a public clock tower akin to those in European cities. The clock mechanism was imported from England and was installed in 1910. The tower immediately became the sole reliable timekeeper for the local populace in an era before pocket watches were common

== Structure ==
Ghanta Ghar rises in a five‑tiered structure crowned by a magnificent dome. The ground level presents a broad square base adorned with ornate patios and intricately carved jharokhas, all encircled by an octagonal stone railing that transforms the tower into a commanding roundabout at the heart of the city. The first and second tiers boast elaborately carved stone balconies, while the fourth tier proudly displays the iconic clock, sourced from the same UK maker as London’s Big Ben set within segmental pediments and framed by bold Roman numerals. At the summit, a delicate chhatri gallery of arches and pillars supports the barrel‑shaped dome, and within, a winding spiral staircase leads up to the original clockwork chamber, where the precise mechanics continue to tick after more than a century. The observation deck of Ghanta Ghar rises to approximately 70 ft (21 m) on a square sandstone plinth, constructed entirely of locally quarried red sandstone, Jodhpur’s signature building material

Geography of Ghanta Ghar (Clock Tower), Jodhpur
Location	Jodhpur, Rajasthan, India
Latitude	26.3046° N
Longitude	73.0248° E
Elevation	241 meters (791 ft) above sea level
Climate	Arid, with very hot summers and mild winters
Architecture	Built in 1910, featuring a blend of European and Rajput architectural styles
Height	Approximately 29 meters (95 ft) tall
