= Umed railway station =

Railway station in Rajasthan, India

Umed

General information
- Location: Umed, Jodhpur district, Rajasthan; India
- Coordinates: 26.549322°N 73.605896°E
- Elevation: 307 metres (1,007 ft)
- System: Indian Railways station
- Owner: Indian Railways
- Operator: North Western Railway
- Line: Jodhpur–Bathinda line
- Platforms: 2
- Tracks: Double Electric-Line

Construction
- Structure type: Standard (on-ground station)

Other information
- Status: Functioning
- Station code: UMED
- Zone(s): North Western Railway
- Division(s): Jodhpur

Services
Preceding station	Indian Railways	Following station
Sathin Road towards ?	North Western Railway zone Jodhpur–Bathinda line	Kharia Khangar towards ?
Location
- Interactive map

Umed railway station is a railway station located on the Jodhpur–Bathinda railway line operated by the North Western Railway zone under Jodhpur railway division. It is situated at Umed in Jodhpur district in the Indian state of Rajasthan.
