= Lordi Daijagra =

Lordi Daijagra Lordi Dejgara
- village
- Location in Rajasthan, India Lordi Daijagra (India)
- Coordinates: 26°18′45″N 072°49′54″E
- Country: India
- State: Rajasthan
- District: Jodhpur
- Taluka: Mandor

Government
  - Body: Village panchayat
- Time zone: UTC+5:30 (IST)
- ISO 3166 code: RJ-IN
- Vehicle registration: RJ-

Lordi Daijagra (Lordi Dejgara) is a panchayat village in Rajasthan, India. Administratively, it is under Mandor Taluka, Jodhpur District of Rajasthan. Lordi Daijagra is 26 km by road west of the city of Jodhpur on National Highway 114.

There are three villages in the Lordi Daijagra gram panchayat: Lordi Daijagra, Karani and Lordi Doliya.

== Demographics ==
In the 2001 census, the village of Lordi Daijagra had 2,161 inhabitants, with 1,100 males (50.9%) and 1,061 females (49.1%), for a gender ratio of 965 females per thousand males.

== Schools ==
- Satya Bharti School, primary school
