= Banad =

Village in Rajasthan, India

- Village
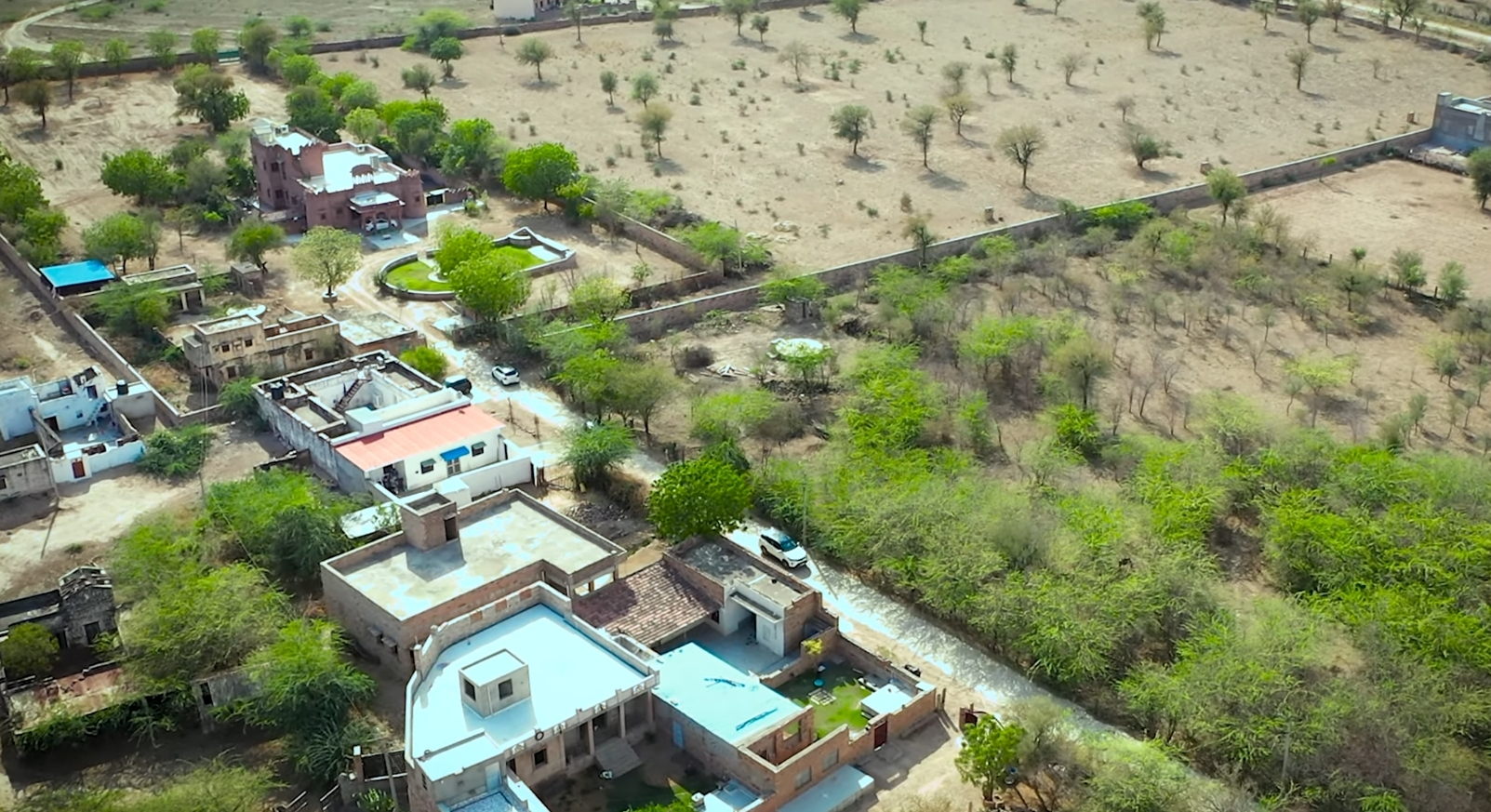

- Location within Rajasthan Location within India
- Coordinates: 26°19′49″N 73°09′06″E
- Country: india India
- State: Rajasthan
- District: Jodhpur
- Assembly constituency: Bhopalgarh Assembly constituency
- Lok Sabha constituency: Pali parliamentary constituency

Government
  - Type: Gram Panchayat
  - Sarpanch: Rajendra Chabbarwal
- Elevation: 244 m (801 ft)

Population (2011)
  - Total: 4,341

Transport Connectivity
  - Nearby Railway Station: [Banar railway station]
  - Nearest Airport: Jodhpur Airport
- Pin Code: 342027
- Post Office: Banar Sub Post Office
- Telephone Code: 02931
- Vehicle registration: RJ-19 / RJ-54
- Vernacular language: Marwadi
- Official language: Hindi
- Assembly MLA: Geeta Barwar
- Parliament MP: P. P. Choudhary

Banad or Banar is a village located in the Mandor tehsil of Jodhpur District, in the Indian state of Rajasthan.

== History ==
Banad was settled in 1900 CE when Thakur Sangidaan Singh of Bhati rajput clan was granted the estate by Maharaja Sir Sardar Singh Bahadur of Jodhpur.

== Demographics ==
According to the 2011 Census of India, Banad had a total population of 4,341, comprising 2,254 males and 2,087 females, resulting in a sex ratio of 926 females per 1,000 males. The village had a literacy rate of 66.48%, with male literacy at 83.02% and female literacy at 48.54%. Children aged 0–6 made up 11.88% of the population. Additionally, 11.5% of the residents belonged to Scheduled Castes, while 8.1% were from Scheduled Tribes. The majority of the population speaks Marwari, with Hindi being the official language used for administrative purposes.

== Transport ==
Banad is accessible by both rail and road. The village is served by the Banad railway station (station code: BNO), which is located approximately 14 km from Jodhpur railway station. The station consists of a single platform and primarily caters to local passenger trains. Public and private bus services are available within the village, providing connectivity to nearby towns and cities. Additionally, Jodhpur Airport is the nearest airport, facilitating air travel for residents and visitors.
