= Pipar Road Junction railway station =

Railway station in Rajasthan

Pipar Road Junction

General information
- Location: Pipar Road, Jodhpur district, Rajasthan; India
- Coordinates: 26.451878°N 73.447749°E
- System: Indian Railways station
- Owner: Indian Railways
- Operator: North Western Railway
- Line: Jodhpur–Bathinda line
- Platforms: 3
- Tracks: 3

Construction
- Structure type: Standard (on ground station)
- Parking: Yes

Other information
- Status: Functioning
- Station code: PPR
- Zone(s): North Western Railway
- Division(s): Jodhpur
Location
- Location within India Location within Rajasthan

Pipar Road Junction railway station is a railway station in Jodhpur district, Rajasthan. Its code is PPR. It serves Piparcity. The station consists of 3 platforms. Passenger, Express and Superfast trains halt here.
