= Jodhpur =

City in Rajasthan, India

- Metropolis
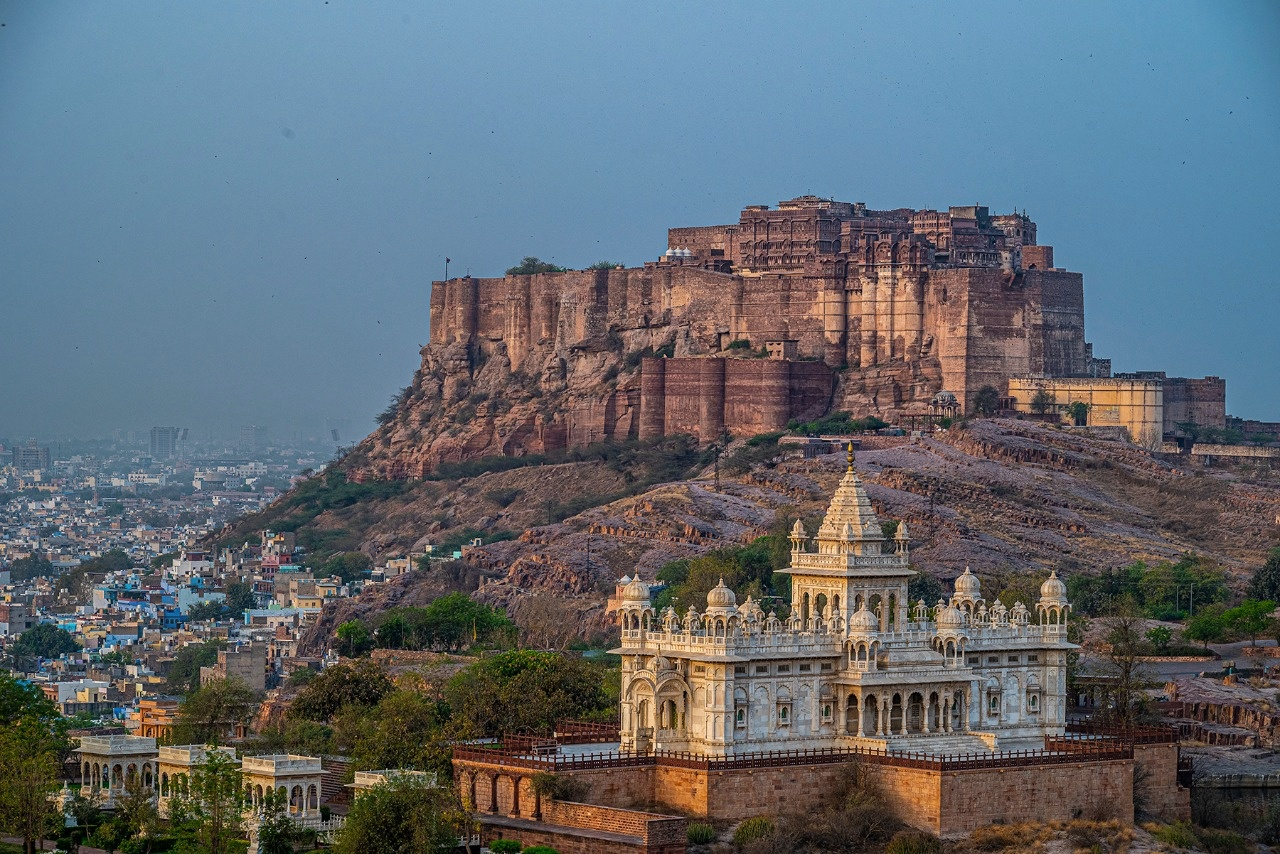
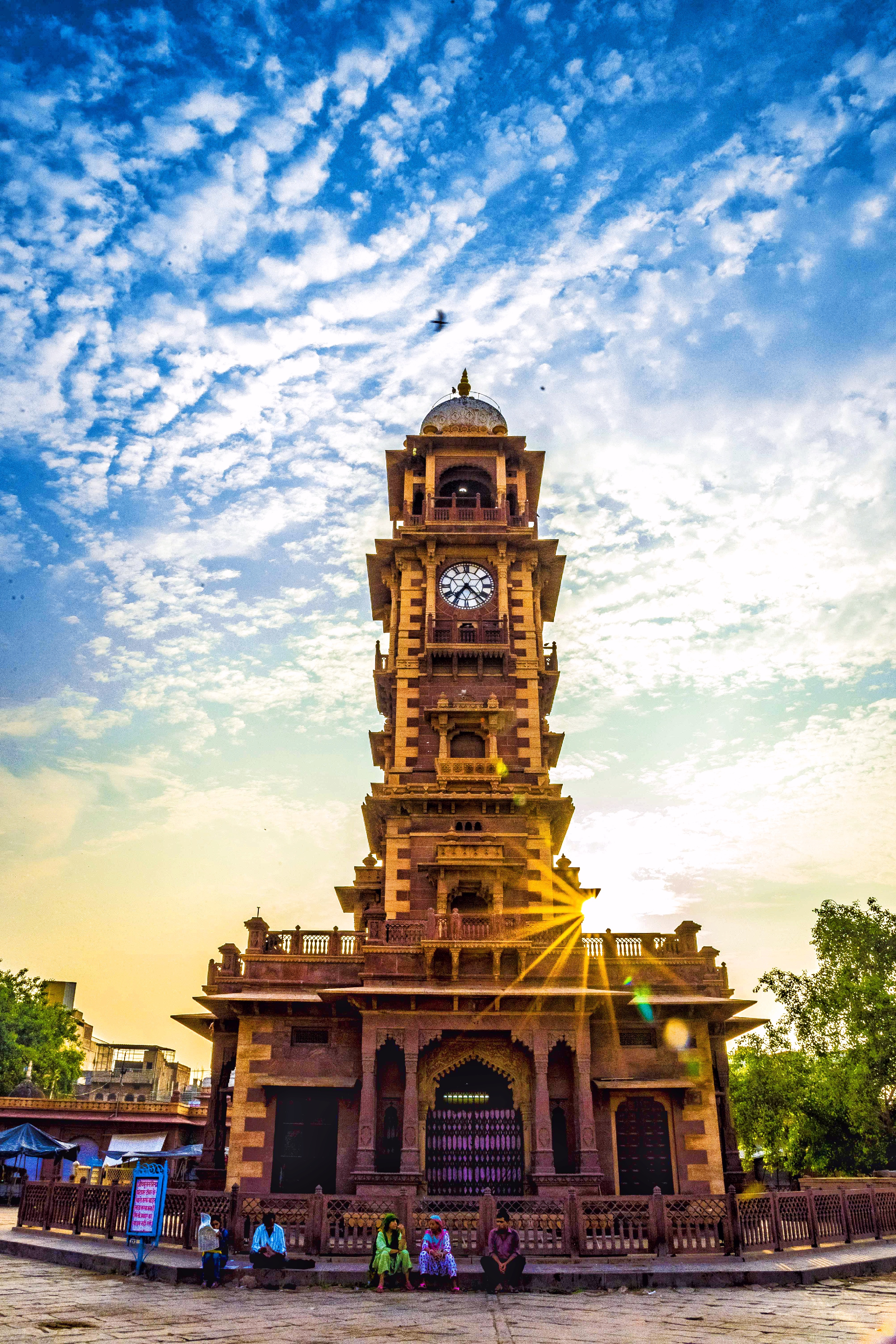
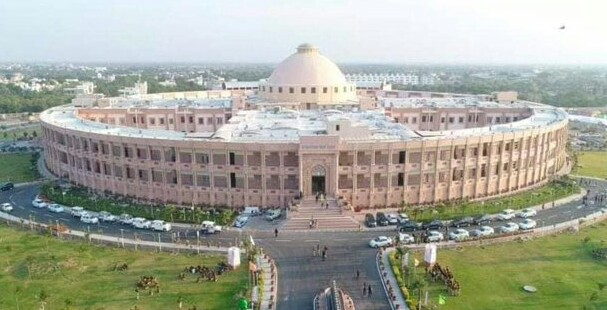
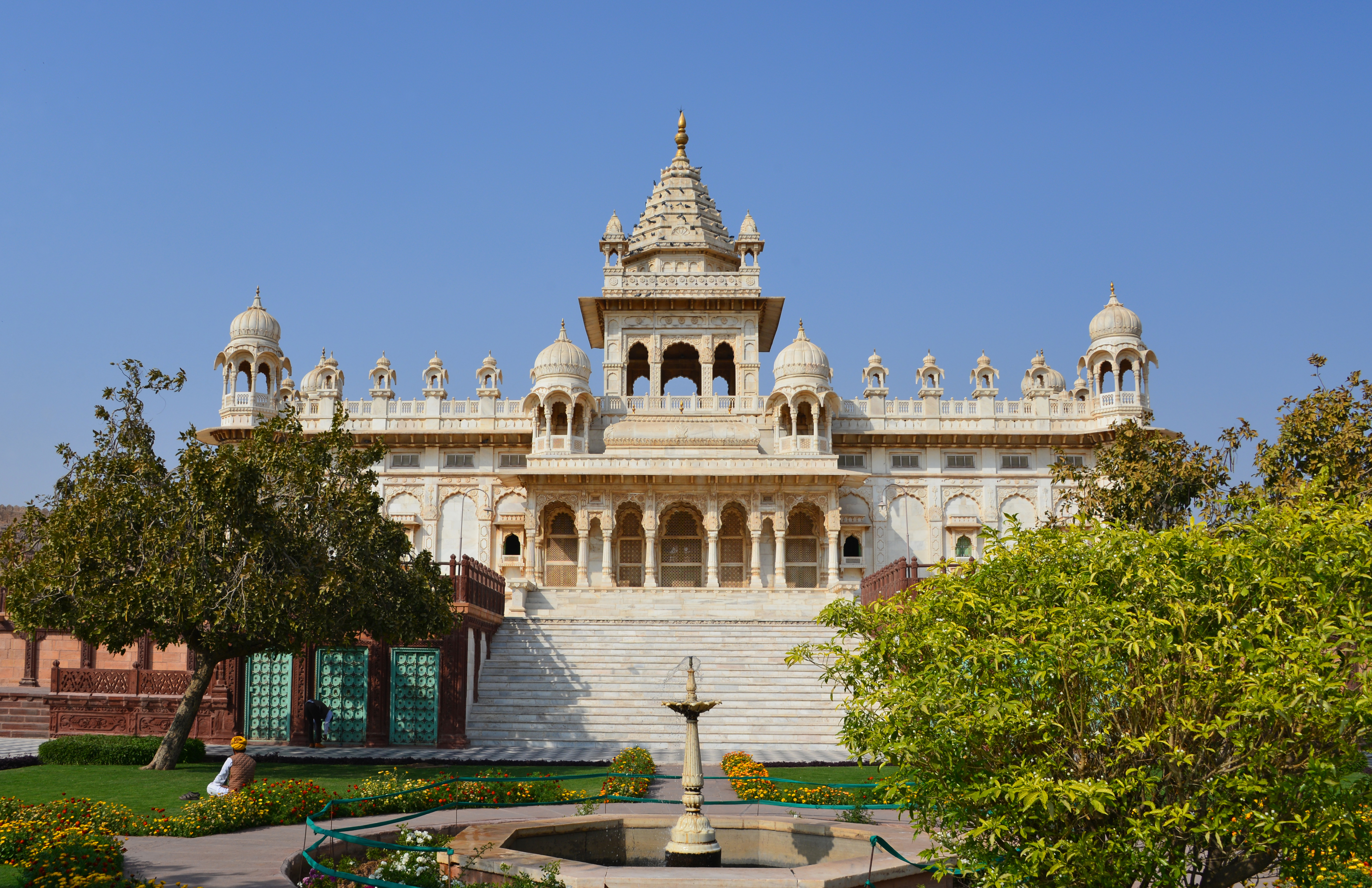
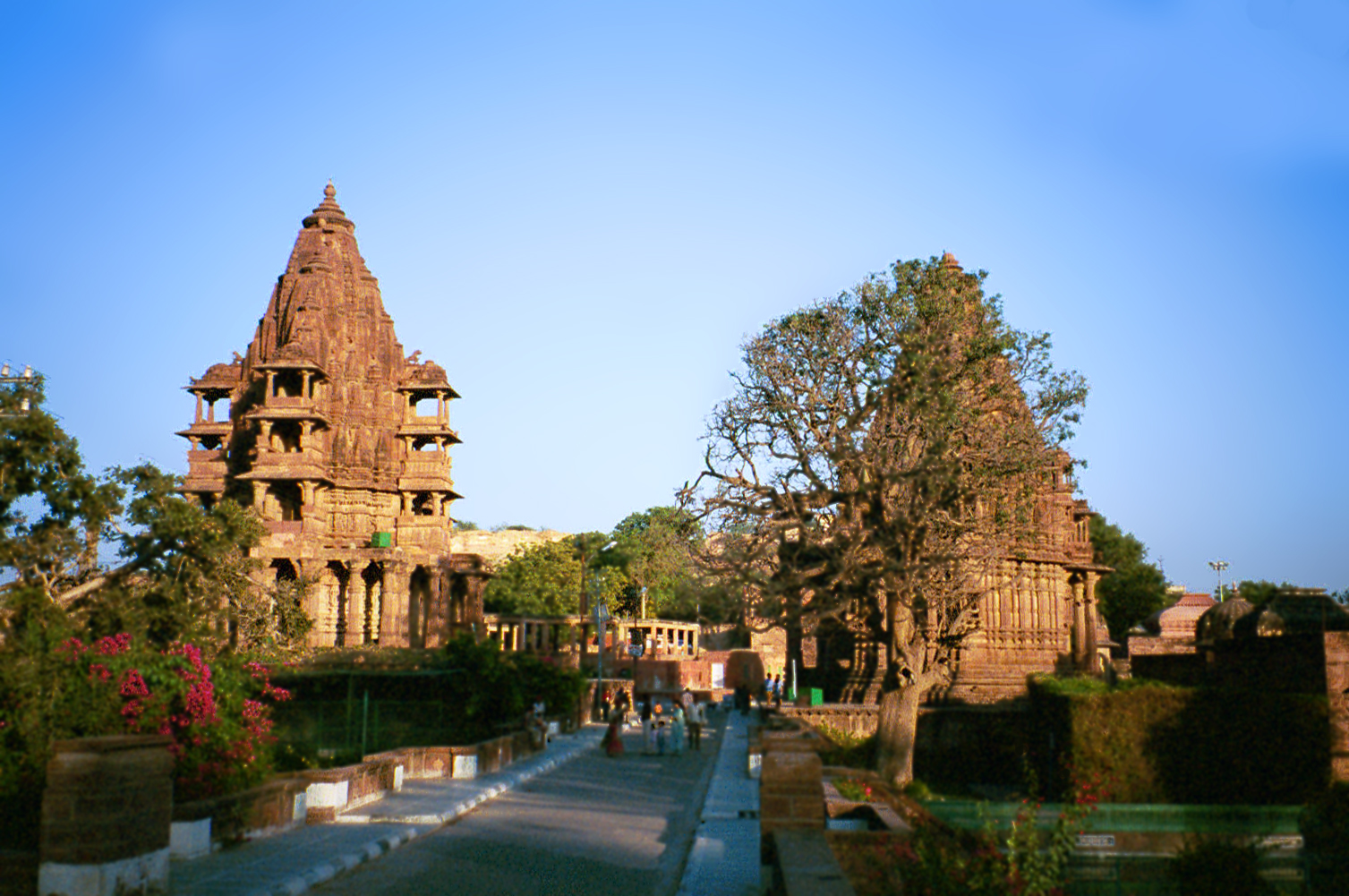
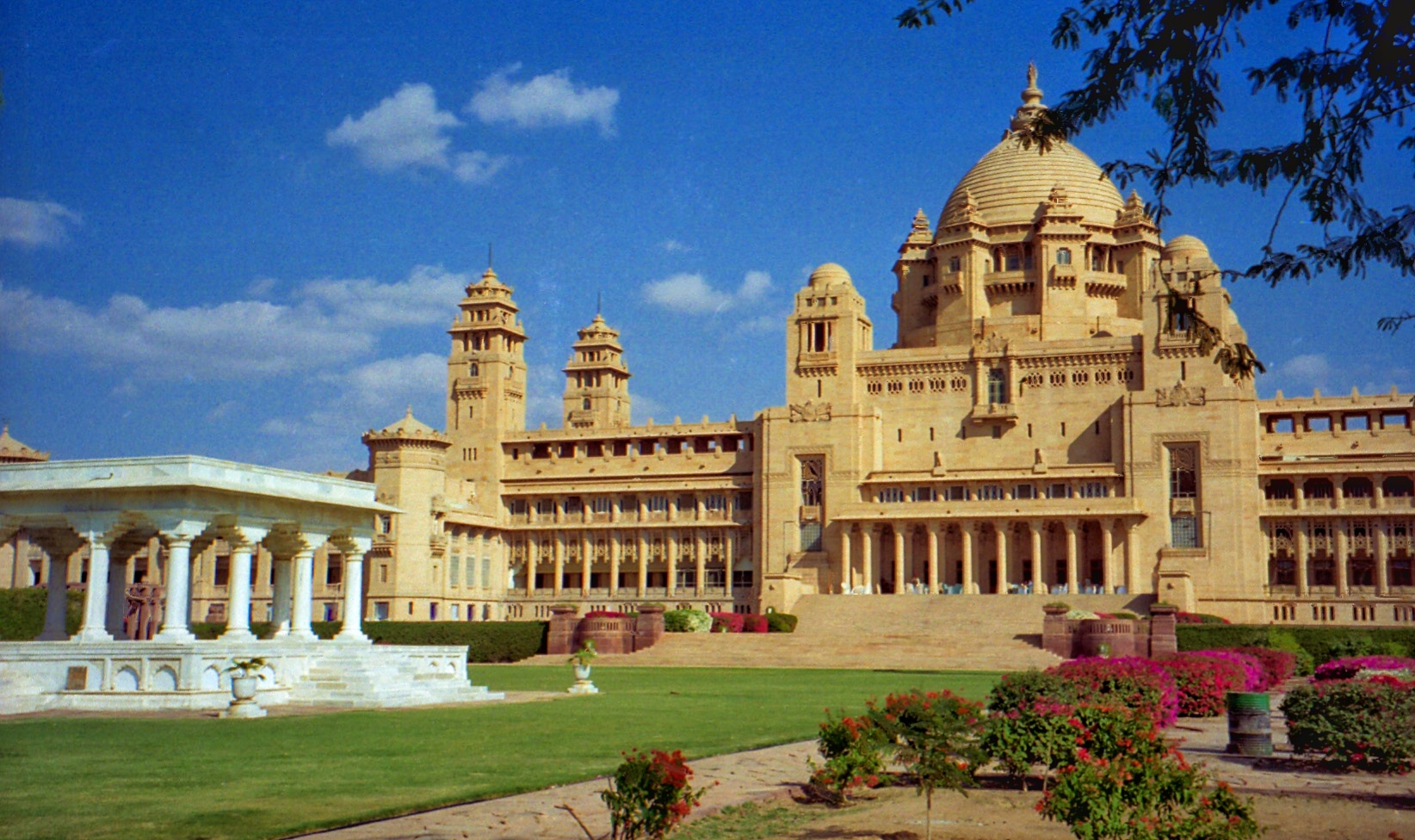
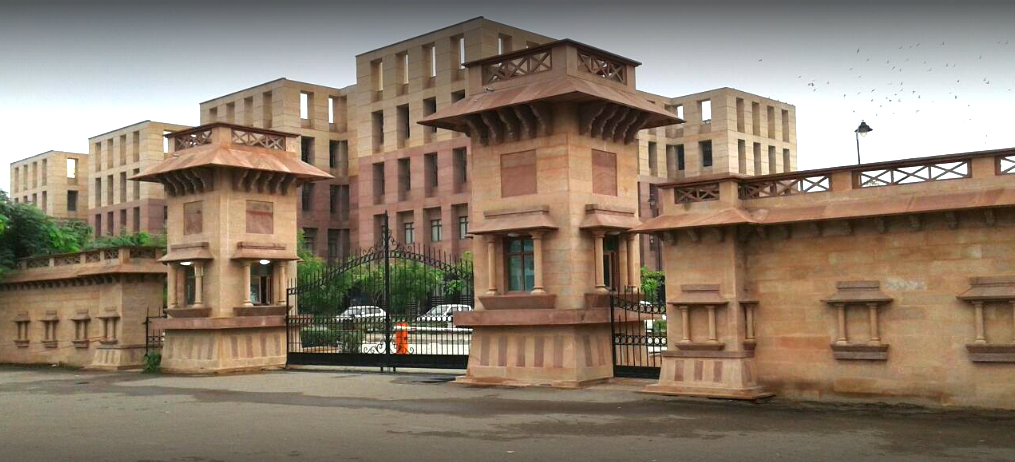
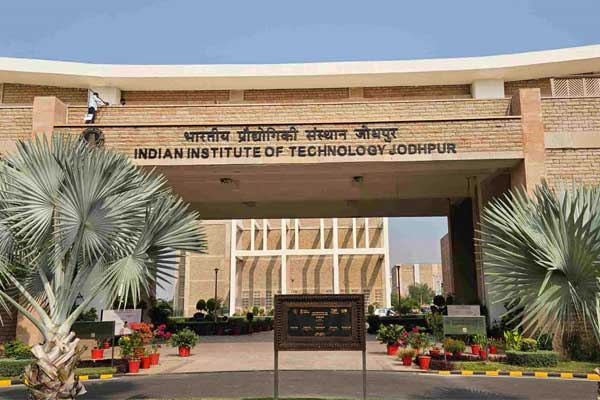
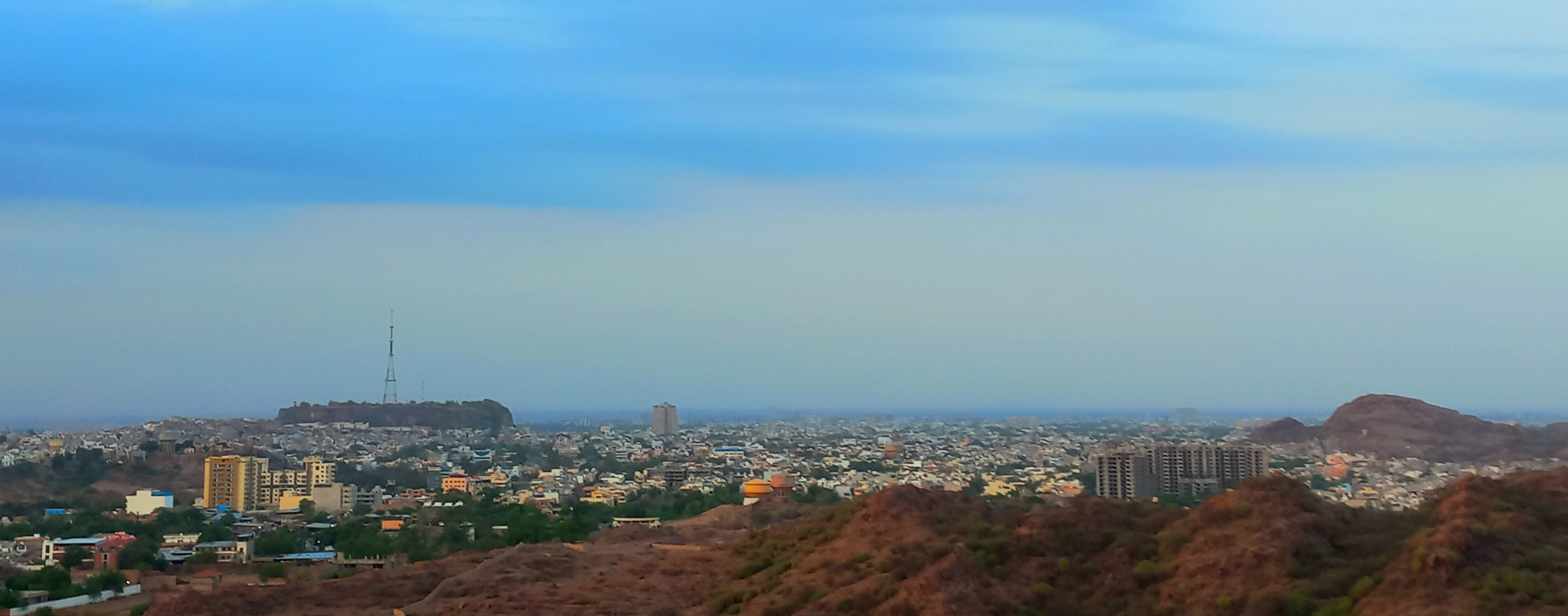
- Mehrangarh Fort Clock Tower Rajasthan High Court Jaswant Thada Mandore Gardens Umaid Bhawan Palace AIIMS Jodhpur IIT Jodhpur Jodhpur Skyline from Kaylana Hills
- Nicknames: The Blue City, The Sun City
- Interactive map of Jodhpur
- Location within Rajasthan Location within India
- Coordinates: 26.28°N 73.02°E
- Country: India
- State: Rajasthan
- Division: Jodhpur
- District: Jodhpur
- Established: 12 May 1459
- Founder: Rao Jodha
- Named for: Rao Jodha

Government
  - Type: Municipal Corporation
  - Body: Jodhpur Municipal Corporation Paras Singhvi(BJP)

Area
  - Metropolis: 233 km^{2} (90 sq mi)
- Elevation: 241 m (791 ft)

Population (2025)
  - Metropolis: 1,509,000
  - Rank: 43rd
  - Density: 6,480/km^{2} (16,800/sq mi)
  - Metro: 1,663,000
- Demonyms: Jodhpuri; Marwari

Languages
  - Official: Hindi
  - Additional official: English
  - Regional: Marwari; Rajasthani
- Time zone: UTC+5:30 (IST)
- PIN: 342001
- Telephone code: 0291
- ISO 3166 code: RJ-IN
- Vehicle registration: RJ-19
- Website: jodhpur.rajasthan.gov.in

Jodhpur (Hindi pronunciation: [ˈd͡ʑoːd̪ʱ.pʊr]) is the second-largest city of the north-western Indian state of Rajasthan, after its capital, Jaipur. As of 2025, the city has a population of 1.6 million. It serves as the administrative headquarters of the Jodhpur district and Jodhpur division. It is the historic capital of the Kingdom of Marwar, founded in 1459 by Rao Jodha, a Rajput chief of the Rathore clan. On 11 August 1947, four days prior to the Indian independence, Maharaja Hanwant Singh, the last ruler of Jodhpur, signed the Instrument of Accession, merging the state into the Union of India. On 30 March 1949, it became part of the newly formed state of Rajasthan, which was created after merging the states of the erstwhile Rajputana.

Situated in the Thar Desert, Jodhpur is a major tourist destination known for its forts, palaces, and temples. It is also known as the 'Blue City' due to the dominant colour scheme of its buildings in the old town. The old city circles the Mehrangarh Fort and is bounded by a wall with several gates. Jodhpur lies near the geographic centre of the Rajasthan state, which makes it a convenient base for travel in a region much frequented by tourists.

== Etymology ==
The name "Jodhpur" is a compound derived from its founder, Rao Jodha, and the Sanskrit suffix -pur (meaning "city" or "settlement"), literally translating to the "City of Jodha".

== Geography and climate ==
Jodhpur has a hot desert climate (Köppen BWh), due to its very high potential evapotranspiration. Although the average rainfall is around 362 mm (14.3 in), which falls mostly from June to September, it fluctuates greatly. In the famine year of 1899, Jodhpur received only 24 mm (0.94 in), but in the flood year of 1917, it received as much as 1,178 mm (46.4 in). Jojari river, a tributary of Luni River, flows from Banad to Salawas in Jodhpur Urban Area. A riverfront development project for the Jojari River, covering a 35 km stretch within the Jodhpur urban Area, was approved in January 2021 under the Namami Gange programme of the Ministry of Jal Shakti. Previously, the project was overseen by the Jodhpur Development Authority. Pin Code of Jodhpur is 342001 which comes under Jodhpur postal division (Jodhpur Region).

Temperatures are extreme from March to October, except when the monsoonal rain produces thick clouds to lower it slightly. In April, May, and June, high temperatures routinely exceed 40 °C. During the monsoon season, average temperatures decrease slightly, but the city's generally low humidity rises, which adds to the perception of the heat. The highest temperature recorded in Jodhpur was on 20 May 2016, when it rose to 48.8 °C (119.8 °F).

Climate data for Jodhpur (1991–2020, extremes 1901–present)
Month	Jan	Feb	Mar	Apr	May	Jun	Jul	Aug	Sep	Oct	Nov	Dec	Year
Record high °C (°F)	35.0 (95.0)	38.3 (100.9)	42.5 (108.5)	48.0 (118.4)	48.8 (119.8)	48.0 (118.4)	44.8 (112.6)	42.9 (109.2)	42.4 (108.3)	42.3 (108.1)	38.4 (101.1)	39.2 (102.6)	48.8 (119.8)
Mean daily maximum °C (°F)	24.5 (76.1)	27.4 (81.3)	33.4 (92.1)	38.4 (101.1)	41.2 (106.2)	40.0 (104.0)	35.2 (95.4)	33.5 (92.3)	34.9 (94.8)	35.8 (96.4)	31.2 (88.2)	26.9 (80.4)	33.5 (92.3)
Daily mean °C (°F)	17.4 (63.3)	20.5 (68.9)	26.0 (78.8)	31.1 (88.0)	34.6 (94.3)	34.2 (93.6)	31.6 (88.9)	29.8 (85.6)	30.0 (86.0)	28.3 (82.9)	23.3 (73.9)	19.1 (66.4)	27.2 (80.9)
Mean daily minimum °C (°F)	9.6 (49.3)	11.7 (53.1)	17.3 (63.1)	22.6 (72.7)	26.5 (79.7)	27.8 (82.0)	26.4 (79.5)	25.4 (77.7)	23.9 (75.0)	20.1 (68.2)	14.7 (58.5)	11.2 (52.2)	19.8 (67.6)
Record low °C (°F)	−0.6 (30.9)	−2.8 (27.0)	4.7 (40.5)	13.5 (56.3)	17.0 (62.6)	18.8 (65.8)	16.2 (61.2)	19.4 (66.9)	15.4 (59.7)	11.7 (53.1)	4.8 (40.6)	0.5 (32.9)	−2.8 (27.0)
Average rainfall mm (inches)	4.1 (0.16)	4.9 (0.19)	3.7 (0.15)	16.3 (0.64)	32.9 (1.30)	42.1 (1.66)	119.7 (4.71)	113.5 (4.47)	55.5 (2.19)	16.0 (0.63)	0.4 (0.02)	1.1 (0.04)	406.2 (15.99)
Average rainy days	0.3	0.6	0.3	0.6	1.2	2.1	6.5	5.9	2.6	0.6	0.2	0.0	21.0
Average relative humidity (%) (at 17:30 IST)	27	24	22	19	20	33	52	58	45	29	32	33	32
Average dew point °C (°F)	6 (43)	7 (45)	7 (45)	8 (46)	12 (54)	19 (66)	24 (75)	24 (75)	21 (70)	13 (55)	9 (48)	6 (43)	13 (55)
Mean monthly sunshine hours	303.8	291.0	288.3	279.0	285.2	132.0	96.1	120.9	180.0	232.5	270.0	294.5	2,773.3
Mean daily sunshine hours	9.8	10.3	9.3	9.3	9.2	4.4	3.1	3.9	6.0	7.5	9.0	9.5	7.6
Average ultraviolet index	5	7	9	11	12	12	12	12	10	8	6	5	9
Source 1: India Meteorological Department (sun 1971–2000) Time and Date (dewpoints, 2005-2015)
Source 2: Tokyo Climate Center (mean temperatures 1991–2020), Weather Atlas

Jodhpur has been ranked 30th best “National Clean Air City” (under Category 1 >10L Population cities) in India.

== History ==
=== Religious ===
The Rajasthan District Gazetteer's of Jodhpur gives examples from the Hindu epic Ramayana, which mention that the Abhiras inhabited the region of what later became Marwar. The Aryans are also mentioned as a race that migrated to this region.

=== Early history ===
The Ghatiyala pillar inscription (AD 996) which was erected by the Pratihara ruler Kakkuka, gives important information about the region. Marwar formed a part of the Gurjara-Pratihara Empire and until 1100 AD was ruled by a powerful Pratihara King. The Pratihars later formed a marital alliance with the Rathores and Mandore was given in dowry by the Pratiharas to a Rathore chieftain called Chunda. Chunda thus established his rule in Mandore and took advantage of the declining Tughlaq dynasty. He defended Marwar against Zafar Khan and conquered Khatu, Didwana, Sambhar, Nagaur and Ajmer from the Tughlaqs.

Jodhpur was founded in 1459 by Rao Jodha, a Rajput chief of the Rathore clan. Jodha succeeded in conquering the surrounding territory from the Delhi Sultanate and thus founded a kingdom that came to be known as Marwar. As Jodha hailed from the nearby town of Mandore, that town initially served as the capital of this state; however, Jodhpur soon took over that role, even during the lifetime of Jodha. The city was located on the strategic road linking Delhi to Gujarat. This enabled it to profit from a flourishing trade in opium, copper, silk, sandalwood, dates, and other tradeable goods.

=== Early modern period ===
After the death of Rao Chandrasen Rathore in 1581, the kingdom was annexed by the Mughal Emperor Akbar, Marwar thus became a Mughal vassal, owing fealty to them while enjoying internal autonomy. Jodhpur and its people benefited from this exposure to the wider world as new styles of art and architecture made their appearance and opportunities opened up for local tradesmen to make their mark across northern India.

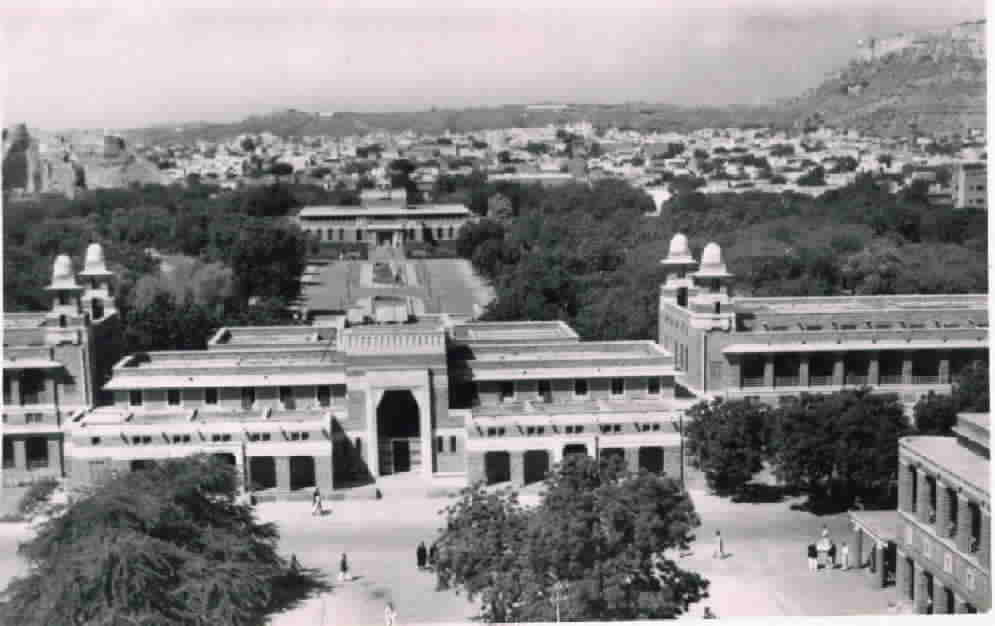
View of the Rajasthan High Court, Sardar Museum in Umaid Park and upper right is Jodhpur fort in 1960.

Aurangzeb briefly sequestrated the state (circa 1679) after the death of Maharaja Jaswant Singh, but his son Maharaja Ajit Singh was restored to the throne by Durgadas Rathore at the death of Aurangzeb in 1707 ending the 30 year long Rathore rebellion. The Mughal Empire declined gradually after 1707, but the Jodhpur court was beset by intrigue; rather than benefiting from circumstances, Marwar descended into strife and invited the intervention of the Marathas, who soon supplanted the Mughals as overlords of the region. In 1755 Jai Appa Scindia attacked Nagaur after looting several places of Rajasthan. Jai Appa halted his army near samas pond of Tausar which was 3.5 km from Nagaur fort. He surrounded Nagaur fort and cut off food and water supply. Maharaja Vijay Singh called Darbar and asked for volunteers to kill Scindia. Gaji Khan Khokhar (Chawata Kallan) and Kan Singh (Dotalai) volunteered and took responsibility for killing Jaiappa Scindia. Both changed their outfit as traders and opened shop near Jaiappa's army. They observed their activities for two month. On 25 July 1755 on Friday at 11 am, when found opportunity attacked Jaiappa with daggers and killed him (Painting situated in Mandore museum). While fighting the loyal soldiers of Jodhpur both were killed. From then on a common proverb still people say "Khokhar bada khuraki kha gaya appa jaisa daaki" (Khokhar are great gluttons, eaten demon like appa). Even after the killing of Jai Appa Sindhia, the Maratha army continued fighting for a few months near Nagaur but they lost hope after Jai Appa's death. Dissipated the wealth of the state, which sought the help of the British and entered into a subsidiary alliance with them.

=== British colonial period ===
A major revolt occurred in 1857 by some Rathore nobles of Pali led by Thakur Kushal Singh of Auwa, but the rebels were defeated by the British Army under Colonel Holmes and peace was restored.

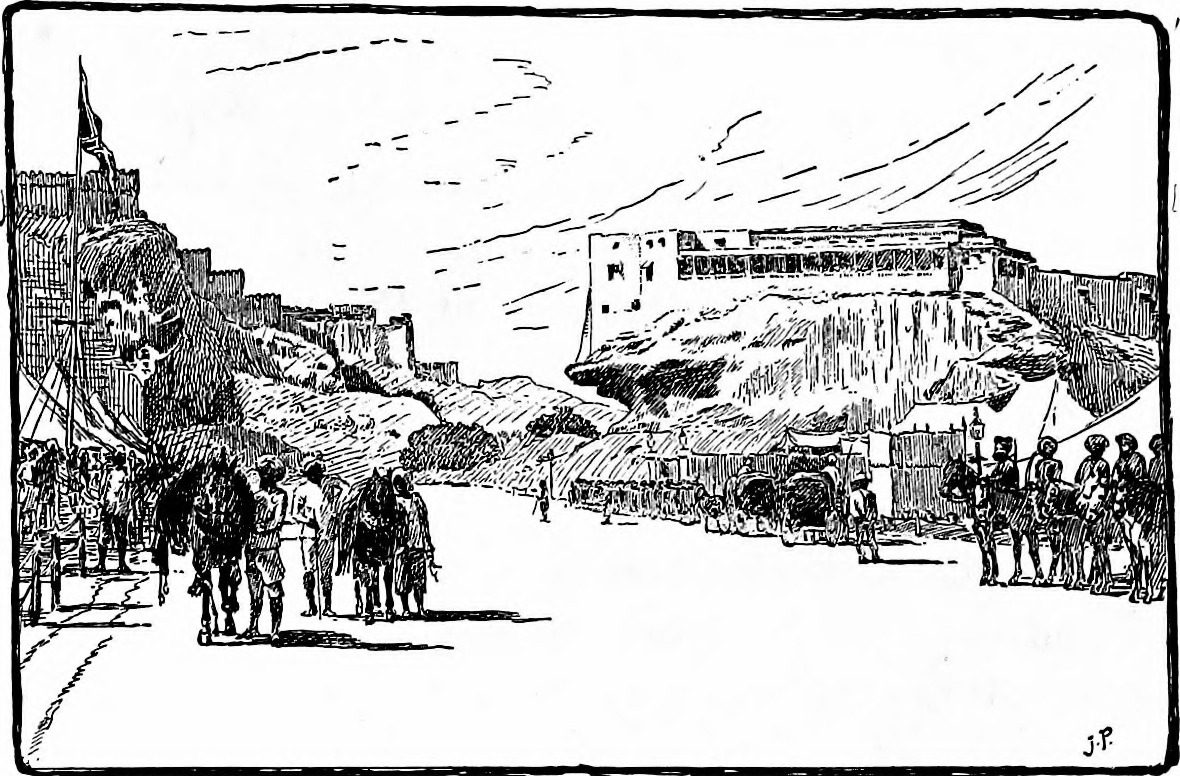
Street Scene of Jodhpur in 1906

During the British Raj, the state of Jodhpur had the largest land area in the Rajputana. The land area of the state was 93,424 km^{2} (36,071 sq mi) its population in 1901 was 44,73,759. It enjoyed an estimated revenue of £3,529,000. Its merchants, the Marwaris, flourished and came to occupy a position of dominance in trade across India.

=== After independence ===
In 1947, when India became independent, the state merged into the union, and Jodhpur became the second-largest city after the Jaipur city in Rajasthan. At the time of division, the ruler of Jodhpur, Hanwant Singh, did not want to join India, but finally, due to the effective persuasion of Vallabhbhai Patel at the time, the state of Jodhpur was included in the Indian Republic. Later after the State Reorganisation Act, 1956 came into effect, it was included within the state of Rajasthan.

== Demographics ==
Historical population

Year	Pop.	±%
1865	150,000	—
1881	142,600	−4.9%
1891	61,800	−56.7%
1901	60,400	−2.3%
1911	59,300	−1.8%
1921	73,500	+23.9%

Year	Pop.	±%
1931	94,700	+28.8%
1941	126,900	+34.0%
1951	180,700	+42.4%
1961	224,800	+24.4%
1968	270,400	+20.3%
1971	318,900	+17.9%

Year	Pop.	±%
1981	506,345	+58.8%
1991	666,279	+31.6%
2001	860,818	+29.2%
2011	1,056,191	+22.7%
2021	1,343,000	+27.2%

Religion in Jodhpur City (2011)
Religion	Percent
Hinduism	76.98%
Islam	19.30%
Jainism	2.70%
Christianity	0.42%
Other or not stated	0.60%
Distribution of religions

As of the 2011 census official report, Jodhpur Municipal Corporation had 196,436 households and a population of 1,056,191. 134,761 (12.76%) were under the age of 7. Jodhpur had a sex ratio of 902 females per 1000 males and a literacy rate of 80.33% for those 7 years and above. Scheduled Castes and Scheduled Tribes made up 133,395 (12.63%) and 25,253 (2.39%) of the population respectively.

The Jodhpur Urban/Metropolitan area includes Jodhpur, Kuri Bhagtasani, Mandore Industrial Area, Nandri, Pal Village and Sangariya. Its urban/metropolitan population is 1,137,815 of which 599,332 are males and 538,483 are females. With the inclusion of 395 villages in Jodhpur city in the month of February 2021 by JoDA, the new population count for the city is 1,663,000 and is expected to grow by 33.04% over the next decade. In the year 2031 population of Jodhpur city is expected to be more than 3.1 million. The population of Jodhpur city after expansion of city borders is 1,663,000.

Languages of Jodhpur (2011)
1. Rajasthani (63.6%)
2. Hindi (25.2%)
3. Marwari (5.52%)
4. Sindhi (1.73%)
5. Urdu (1.27%)
6. Others (2.70%)

At the time of the 2011 census, 63.61% of the population recorded their language as Rajasthani, 25.17% Hindi, 5.52% Marwari, 1.73% Sindhi and 1.27% Urdu.

== Economy ==
Jodhpur contributes $4 billion (approx) to Rajasthan's economy through different Industries. It is also considered the center of India's $200 million handicraft industry. The city is also a major tourist destination, claiming attractive heritage hotels and sights from its long history.

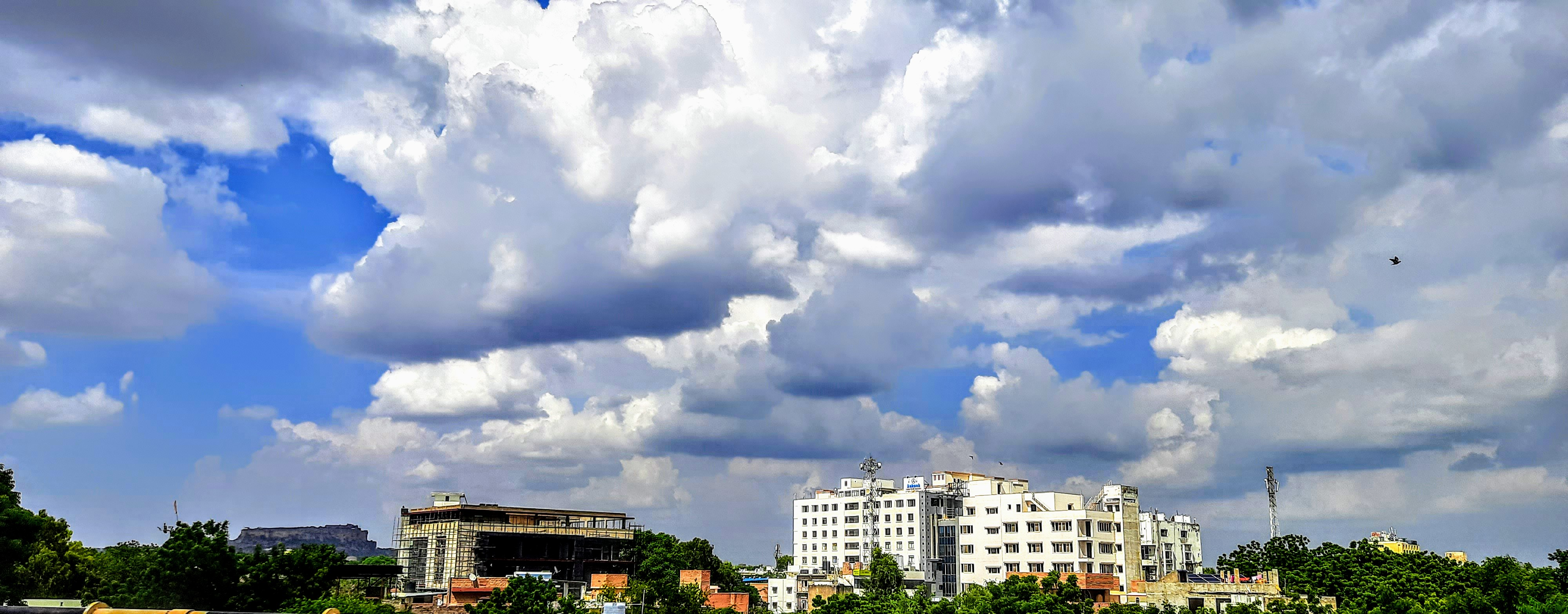
View of PWD Road and Mehrangarh from veer durgadas bridge, Jodhpur

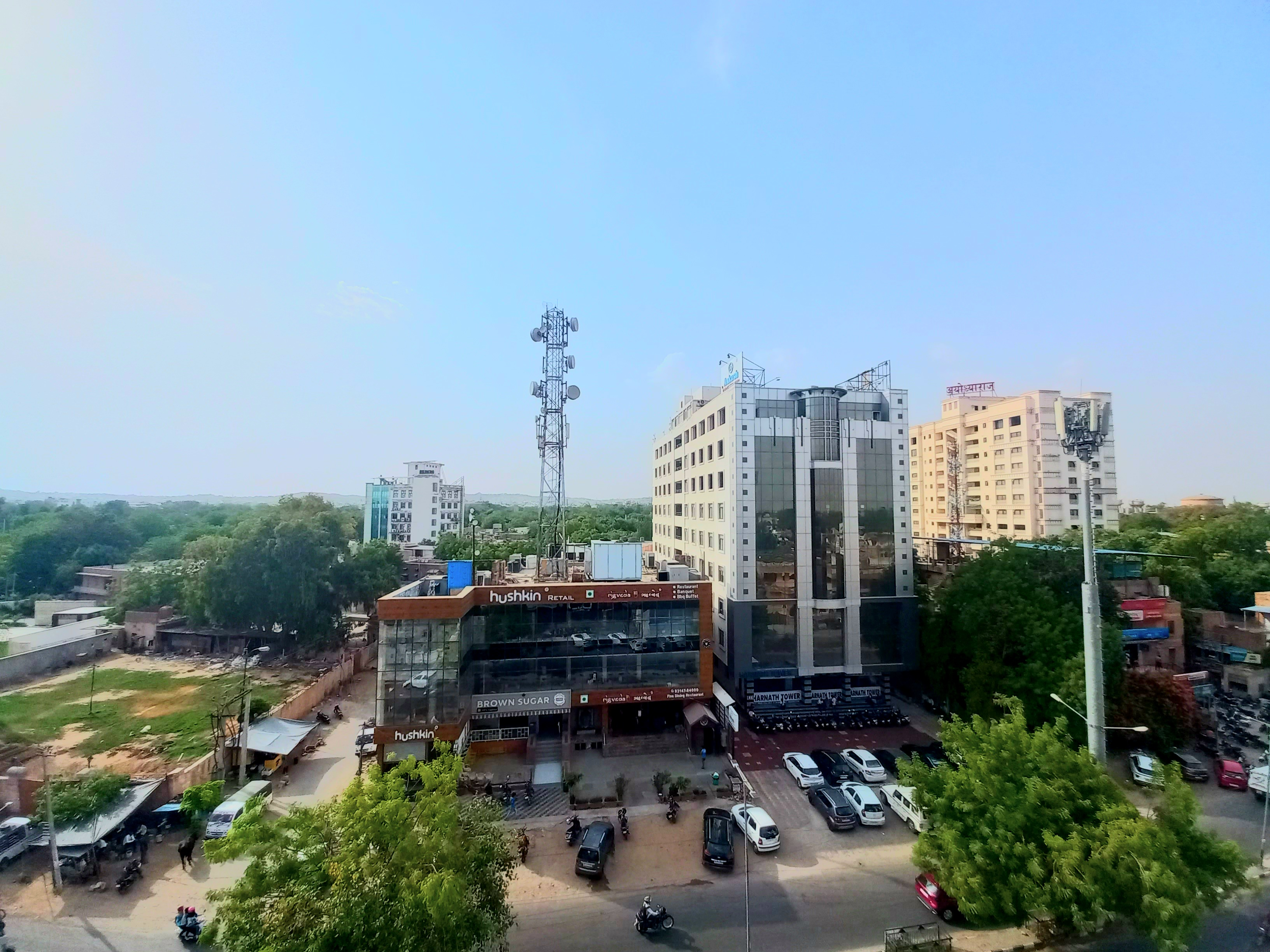
High Rises on PWD road, Jodhpur

Jodhpur also has the largest standardized test training industry in western Rajasthan, with top coaching institutes for the IIT-JEE, NEET-UG and NEET-PG, and Civil Service Exams.

Hindustan Petroleum Corporation Limited (HPCL) and the government of Rajasthan have been working since 2018 on a joint project to construct a refinery in Pachpadra, Barmer district with a capacity of nine MMTPA (million metric tonnes per annum). The refinery is expected to come online in January 2024, and was described by Union Petroleum Minister Hardeep Singh Puri as "...the 'Jewel of the Desert', bringing jobs, opportunities and joy to the people of Rajasthan...".

India's most ambitious industrial development project, the over US$100 billion Delhi-Mumbai Industrial Corridor Project is also expected to impact the industrial scenario in Jodhpur in a big way. Marwar Junction, which is located about 100 kilometres from the city, will be one of the nine freight loading points along the DMIC route. In addition, both the Jodhpur and Pali districts fall under the region that is planned to be developed as a manufacturing hub for the DMIC.

== Governance and administration ==
=== Elected representatives ===
The present Member of Parliament from Jodhpur is Gajendra Singh Shekhawat of the BJP.

=== Civic administration ===
Jodhpur City officials
Mayor	Kunti Deora Parihar (Jodhpur North); Vanita Seth (Jodhpur South)
Collector	Gaurav Agarwal IAS
Police Commissioner	Ravidutt Gaur, IPS
Chief Justice of the Rajasthan High Court	Hon'ble Justice Mr. Augustine George Masih
Chairman, Jodhpur Development Authority	Himanshu Gupta, IAS

Till 2020, the city was administered by a single municipal body, Jodhpur Nagar Nigam with a mayor. In 2019, the Rajasthan government decided to form two municipal corporation in Jaipur, Jodhpur and Kota for better administration. For administrative purposes, the city is divided into wards, from which the members of the corporation council are elected for five years. The municipal corporation has elected members known as councilors, or parshad in Hindi, representing their respective wards (geographical units of the city). The ward members are elected by direct voting by electorate for a period of 5 years. In addition to these directly elected members, the corporation has four ex-officio members (one member of parliament, three members of legislative assembly, namely Sardarpura, Soorsagar, City), and three nominated members. Currently, the city has two civic bodies – Jodhpur North and Jodhpur South each headed by a mayor. Each municipal corporation has 80 wards, making a total of 160 wards in the city. The Jodhpur Development Authority (JDA) executes and supervises plans and schemes for the development of the urban region.

==== Tehsils of Jodhpur ====
- Phalodi

== Strategic location ==
Jodhpur is a significant city of western Rajasthan and lies about 250 km from the border with Pakistan. This location makes it a key base for the Indian Army, Indian Air Force (IAF), and Border Security Force. Jodhpur's South Western Air Command is one of Asia's largest and one of the most critical and strategically located airbases of the IAF (The Jodhpur Airport played the crucial role during the Indo-Pakistani wars of 1965 and 1971) deployed fighter jets and advanced light helicopters. There are 5 squadrons of the Indian Air force that are known as the 32 wing.

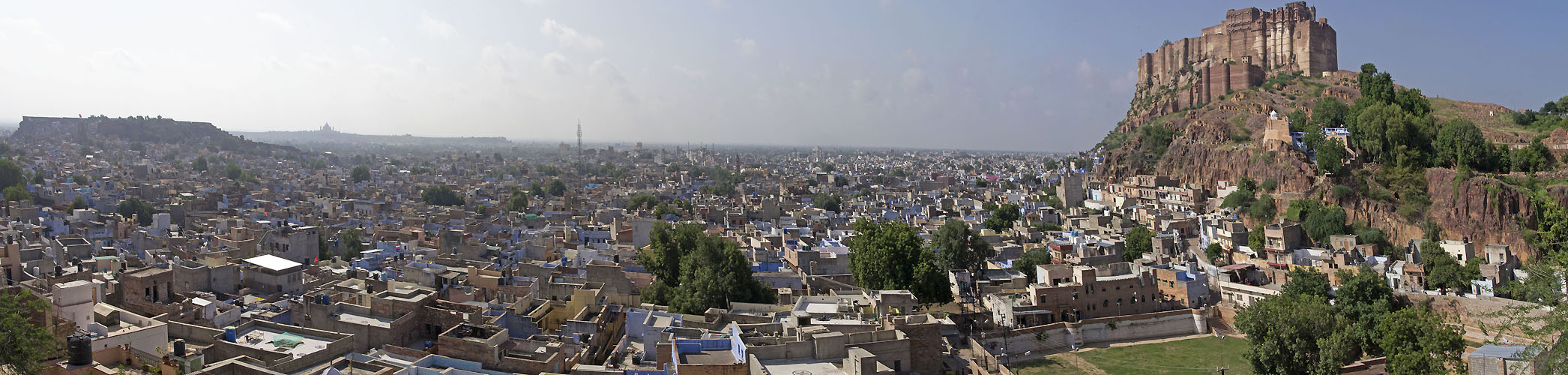
Panorama view of Jodhpur, with the Mehrangarh Fort to the right, and the city centre below

== Culture ==
Jodhpur has culturally been known by the name of Jodhana by the locals. The city is famous for its food and its popularity can be judged by the fact that one can find sweet shops named "Jodhpur Sweets" in many cities throughout India. Being at the onshore of Thar Desert, life has been influenced by ways of select nomadic tribes (so-called "gypsy" groups – Banjara in Hindi – have settled in some parts of the city). Jodhpur has distinct cultural identity through its food and is famous for its Mirchi Bada, Rabdi Ghewar and Mawa Kachori.

=== Tourism ===
Jodhpur's most notable attractions are Mehrangarh Fort which overlooks upon the city, the blue bylanes of the old city are also an attraction, Umaid Bhawan Palace, Jaswant Thada, and the Ghanta Ghar, or Clock Tower. Tourists are also within proximity to Mandore Garden, Kaylana Lake and Garden, Balsamand Lake, Machia Biological Park, Rao Jodha Desert Rock Park, Ratanada Ganesh Temple, Toorji Ka Jhalra, Sardar Samand Lake and Palace, Masooria Hills, Veer Durgadas Smarak (monument, park, and museum), Surpura Dam and Bhim Bhadak Cave. Other attractions of people are at markets of food, antique items, traditional clothes and traditional shoes (also called Jodhpuri Mojari) held in Jodhpur. Mahamandira, a temple consecrated to Sri Jalandharnath, is known for its murals showing ascetics in yoga poses and murals bearing inscriptional records of the dignitaries visiting the shrine which includes Charanas, nobles, and the Rajas.

Tourism in Jodhpur

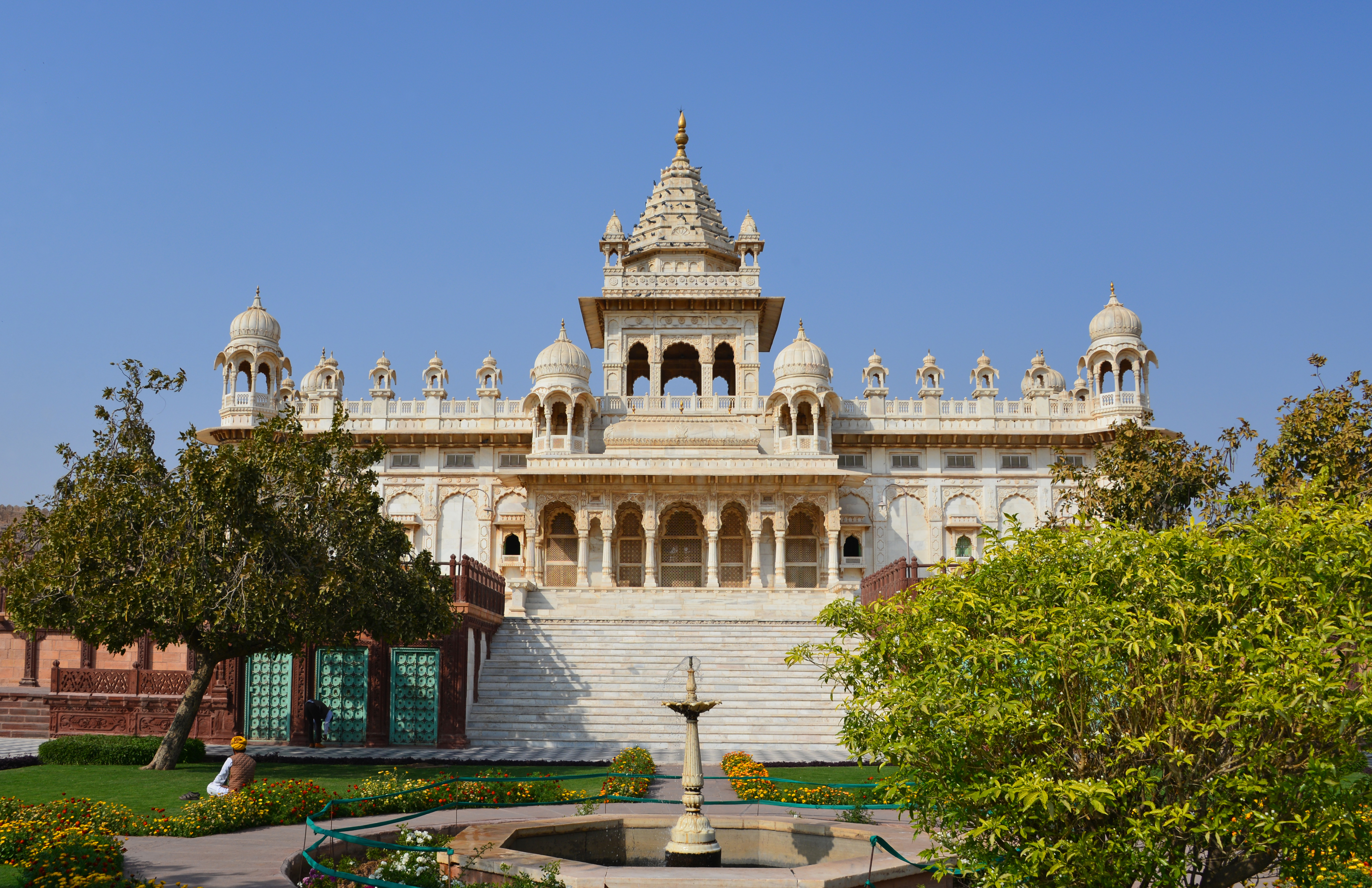
Jaswant Thada

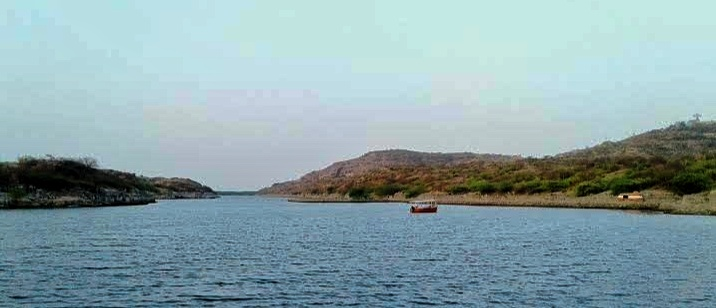
Kaylana Lake

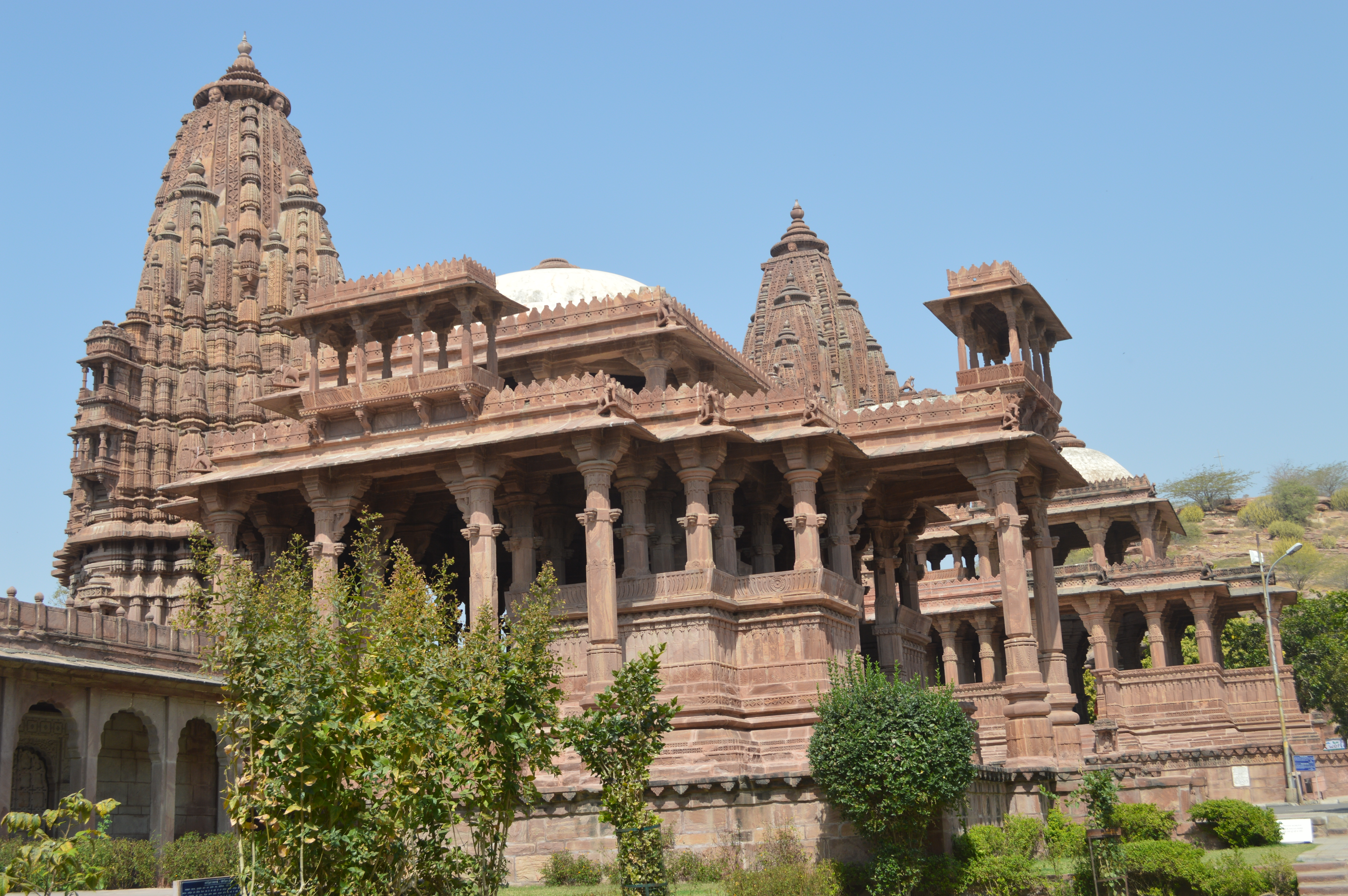
Cenotaphs at Mandore Garden

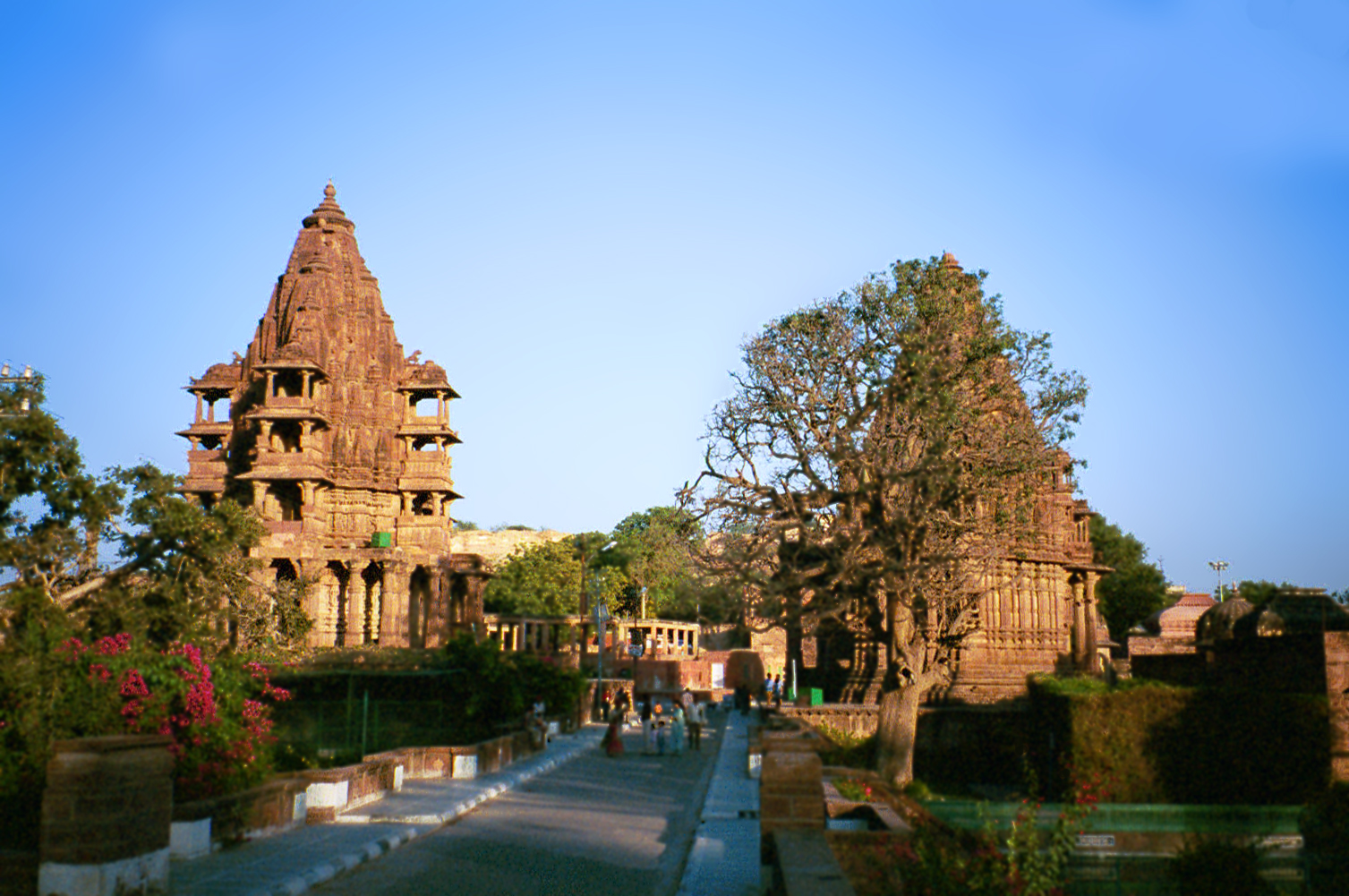
Mandore Gardens

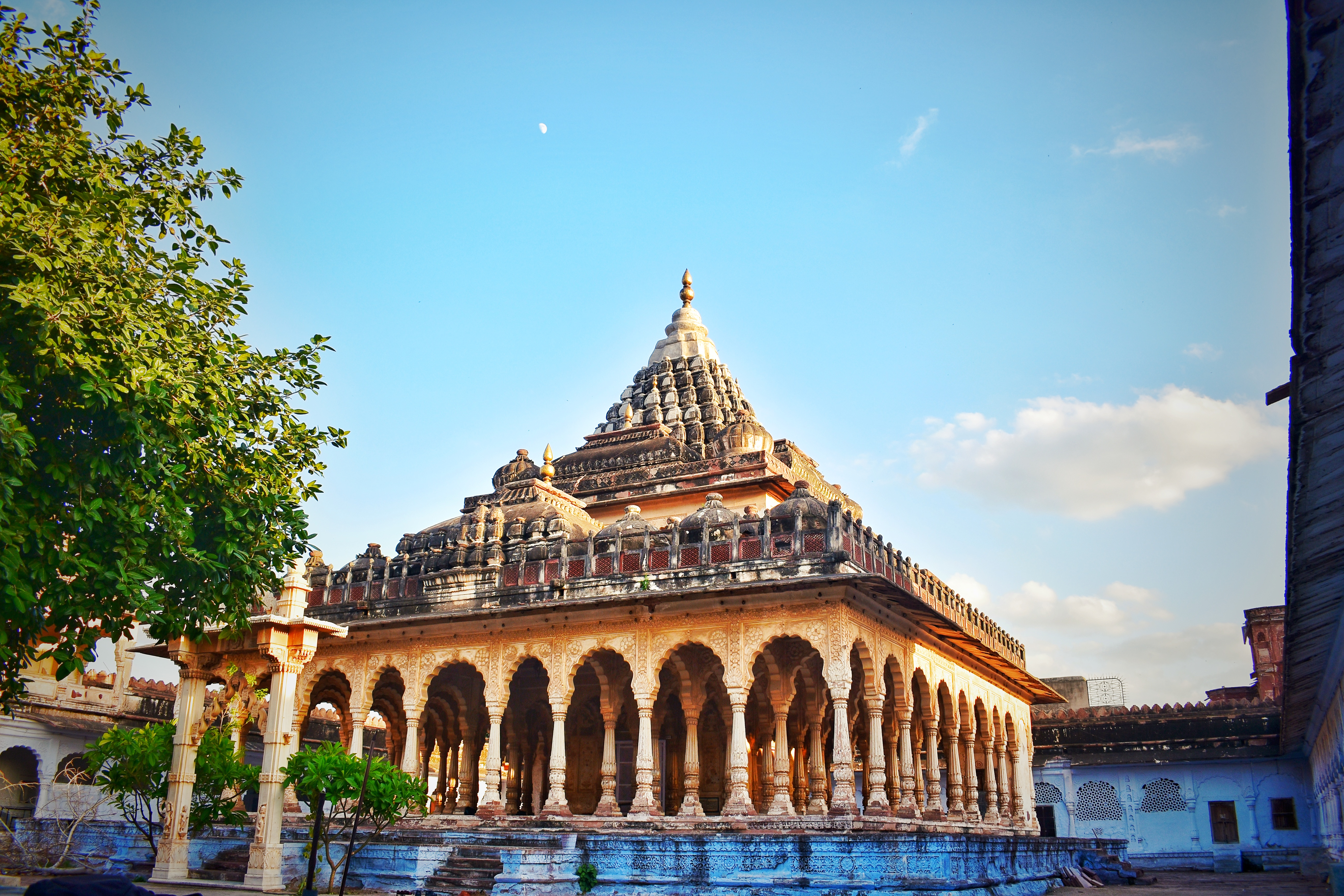
Mahamandir Temple

=== Motion-picture industry ===
The city is famous for its charming locations and is often featured in various films, advertisements, music videos, and soaps. The historic buildings and landscapes of the city were featured in a number of movies, including The Dark Knight Rises directed by Christopher Nolan; Baadshaho starring Ajay Devgn and Emraan Hashmi, The Darjeeling Limited starring Owen Wilson, Adrien Brody, and Jason Schwartzman; The Fall directed by Tarsem Singh; Hum Saath-Saath Hain directed by Sooraj Barjatya; Veer directed by Anil Sharma; Shuddh Desi Romance directed by Maneesh Sharma; I directed by S. Shankar, Kung Fu Yoga starring Jackie Chan, Sonu Sood, and Disha Patani; Loafer starring Varun Tej and Disha Patani; Supreme starring Sai Dharam Tej and Rashi Khanna; and Airlift featuring Akshay Kumar and Nimrat Kaur.

=== Cuisine ===
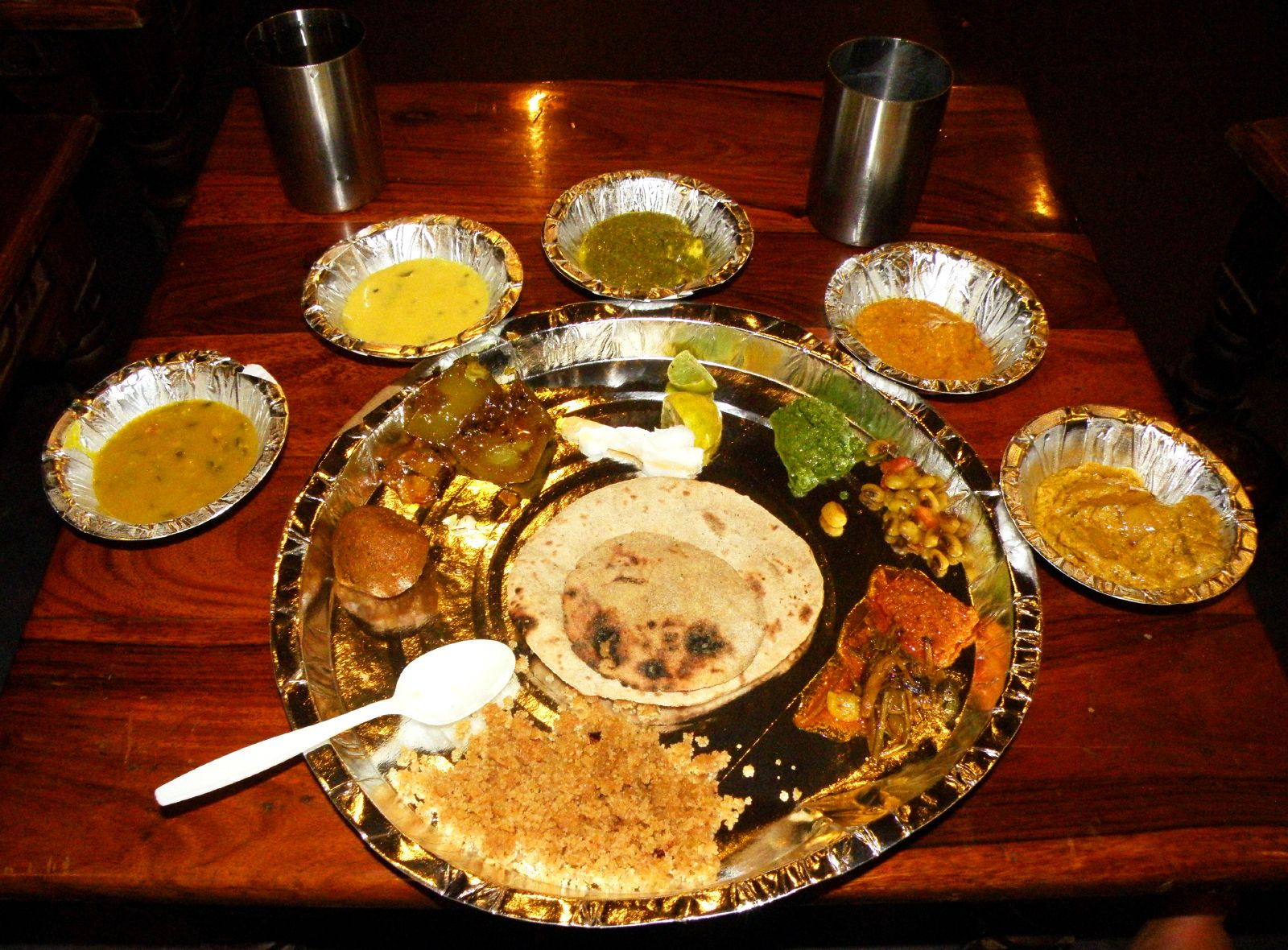
Rajasthani thali

A number of dishes from Indian cuisine originated in Jodhpur. The city savours a number of food items, but the specialties of the city are Pyaaj Kachori, Mirchi Bada and Mawa Kachori.

Dal-Baati-Churma, Makhaniya Lassi, Ker Sangri, Lasan Ki chutney, Mirchi ka kutti, gatte ki sabji and gulab jamun ki sabji are some other famous foods in Jodhpur.

== Education and research ==
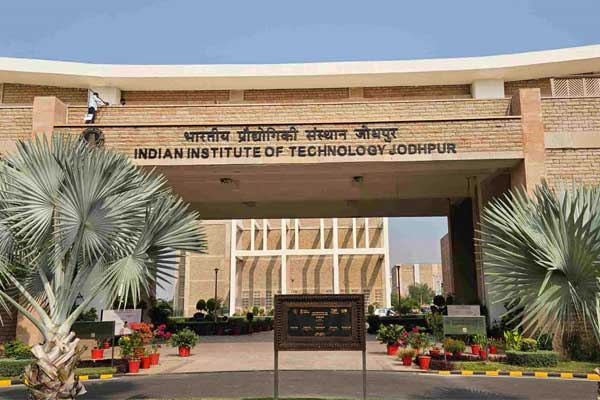
IIT Jodhpur

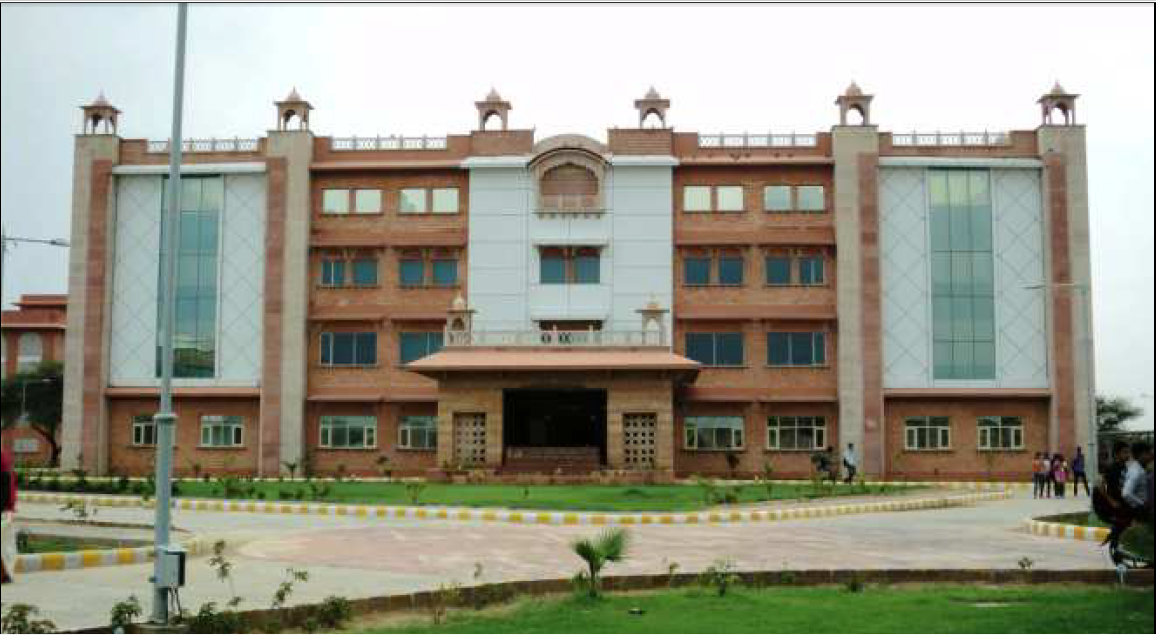
Footwear Design and Development Institute, Jodhpur

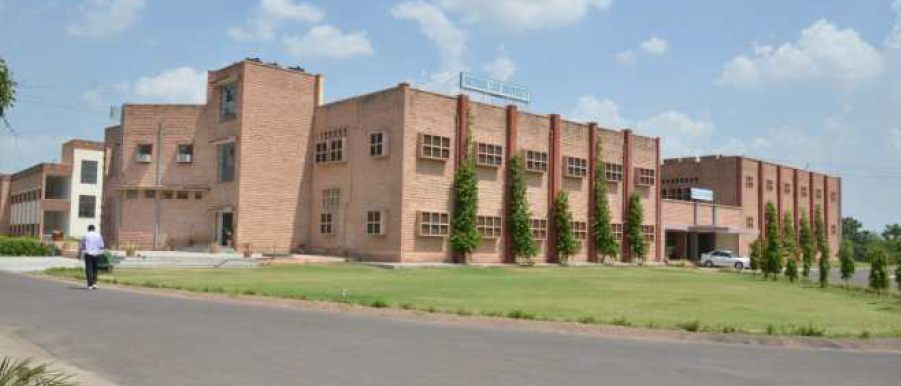
National Law University Jodhpur

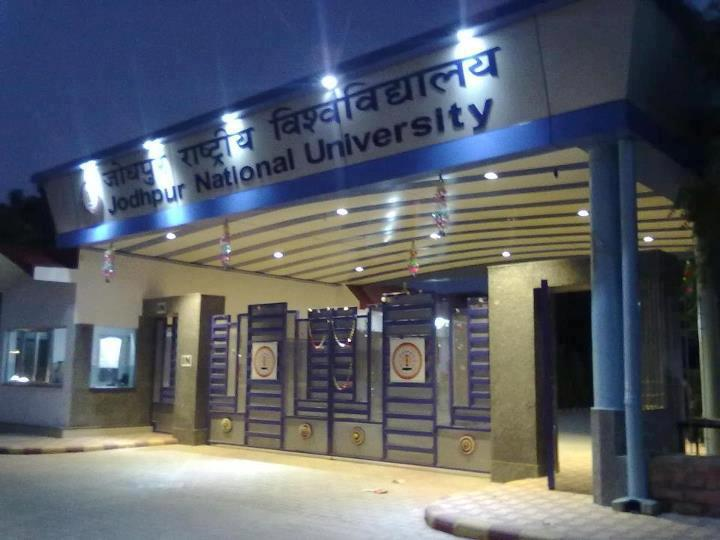
Jodhpur National University

Educational facilities include:

- Indian Institute of Technology Jodhpur is a technical education institute in India, one of the new Indian Institutes of Technology (IIT).
- All India Institute of Medical Sciences Jodhpur
- National Law University, Jodhpur, is one of the 17 universities imparting law education (established in 1999).
- National Institute of Fashion Technology Jodhpur is a fashion-design institute (started in 2010).
- Dr. Sarvepalli Radhakrishnan Rajasthan Ayurved University is a university in the field of Ayurveda. The second university of its kind in India, it was started in 2003.
- Jai Narain Vyas University (JNVU), formerly known as University of Jodhpur, is run by the state government of Rajasthan (established in 1962).
- Dr. S.N. Medical College, Jodhpur (established in 1965).
- MBM Engineering College: the oldest engineering institution in Rajasthan, it is now a faculty of engineering and architecture, under JNVU (established in 1951).
- Footwear Design and Development Institute Jodhpur is an institute established by the government of India, Ministry of Commerce and Industry for the design and development of footwear, fashion, and leather (started in 2012).
- Indian Institute of Handloom Technology is one of the five institutes nationwide to provide research, development, and technical education to the handloom industry.
- Sardar Patel University of Police, Security and Criminal Justice, started in 2013, is a university for research and education in the field of security, policing, and criminal justice.
- Krishi Vishwavidyalaya, Jodhpur, started in 2013 is an Agricultural University for research, education and extension in the field of Agricultural Sciences & Technology for farmer of Marwar Region.

=== Research ===
Major research institutes and organizations have been established in the city for promoting research:

- Arid Forest Research Institute is one of the institutes of the Indian Council of Forestry Research and Education working under the Ministry of Environment and Forests, for carrying out scientific research in forestry to provide technologies to increase the vegetative cover and to conserve the biodiversity in the hot arid and semiarid region of Rajasthan, Gujarat, and Dadara union, and Nagar Haveli union territory. The campus covers 66 hectares on the New Pali Road.
- Central Arid Zone Research Institute is a premier organisation of the Indian Council of Agricultural Research, an autonomous organization under the Department of Agricultural Research and Education, Ministry of Agriculture, government of India.
- National Institute for Implementation Research on Non-Communicable Diseases is one of the 33 permanent institutes of Indian Council of Medical Research, which is an autonomous body for the formulation, coordination, and promotion of biomedical research in the country.
- Desert Regional Centre, Zoological Survey of India is the regional arm of the only taxonomic organization in the country involved in the study of all kinds of animals to promote survey, exploration, and research leading to the advancement of zoological study.
- Botanical Survey of India is the nodal research organization under Ministry of Environment and Forests for research, exploration, and survey of the flora of India.
- Defence Research and Development Organisation is an organization working under the Department of Defence Research and Development of Ministry of Defence for design and development leading to the production of world-class weapons systems and equipment.
- Regional Remote Sensing Centre is one of the five centres established under National Natural Resources Management System by Department of Space for remote sensing tasks at regional and national levels.
- MBM Engineering College conducts research and has masters and PhD programs in branches of engineering by highly experienced faculty. In civil and chemical engineering, national and state projects are performed by this college.

== Judiciary ==
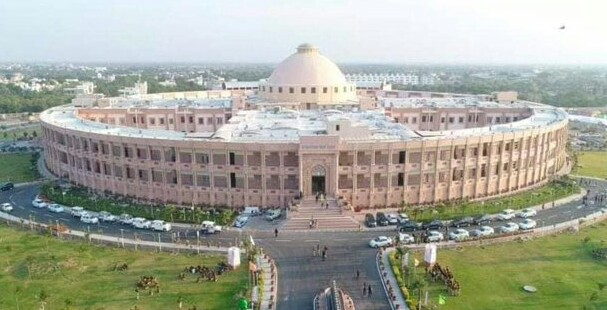
New building of Rajasthan High Court in Jodhpur.

Rajasthan High Court is the High Court of the state of Rajasthan. It was established on 21 June 1949 under the Rajasthan High Court Ordinance, 1949.

The High Court of Rajasthan was founded in 1949 in Jodhpur and was inaugurated by the Rajpramukh, Maharaja Sawai Man Singh on 29 August 1949. The first Chief Justice was Kamala Kant Verma and the current Chief Justice of the Rajasthan High Court is the Honorable Justice Manindra Mohan Shrivastava. A bench was formed at Jaipur which was dissolved in 1958 and was again formed on 31 January 1977. Currently, there are forty sanctioned judges.

== Transportation ==
The city has well-established rail, road, and air networks connecting it to other major cities of the country.

=== Railways ===
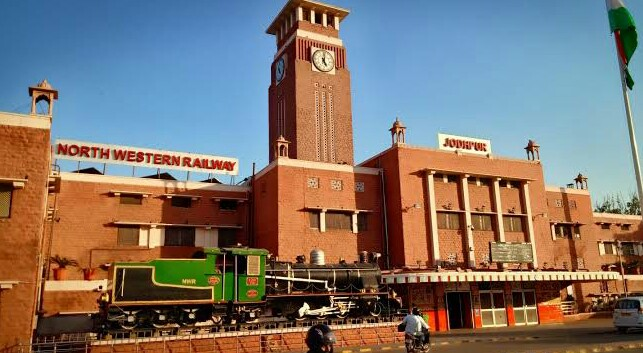
Jodhpur junction railway station

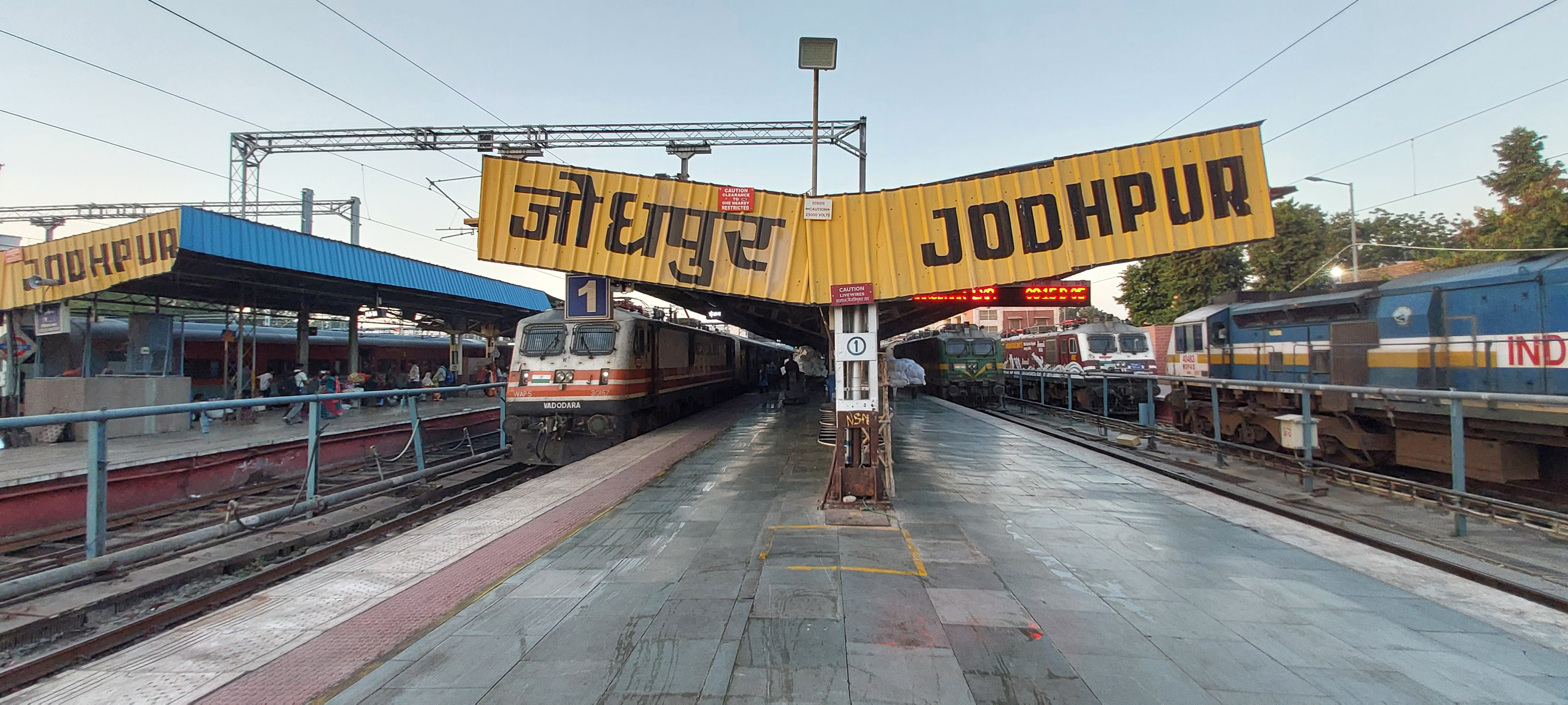
Jodhpur railway station

For experiencing the true magnificence and royal opulence of Rajasthan, luxury trains Palace on Wheels, Royal Rajasthan on Wheels, and Maharaja Express are run jointly by Rajasthan Tourism Development Corporation and Indian Railways. Jodhpur is one of the destinations of both of the trains.

In the 2012-13 Railway Budget, a plan for building a High Speed Rail Corridor between Delhi-Jodhpur via Jaipur and Ajmer of 591 km was introduced which later in 2020 was included in HSR by Indian Railways and Government of India and now is in Pre-Feasibility phase.

In 2013, a plan to start metro train service in Jodhpur was proposed by then Rajasthan Government to decongest the city traffic. However, this proposal is still pending with the state government for its approval. But in 2021, Jodhpur Development Authority and Municipal Corporations made a Future Mobility Plan where a 35-km Metro Line is proposed from IIT Jodhpur to Jaisalmer Bypass after Year 2030. With another proposed 11 more BRTS Corridors in Jodhpur between 2021–2030 to provide public transport to the increasing population before starting Metro.

Suburban stations around Jodhpur:

No.	Suburban Station Name	Distance (in km)
1	Raikabagh Palace Junction	02
2	Bhagat Ki Kothi railway station	03
3	Mahamandir Railway Station	05
4	Basni Railway Station	06
5	Jodhpur Cantt Railway Station	08
6	Mandor Railway Station	10
7	Banar Railway Station	14
8	Salawas Railway Station	16

=== Air ===
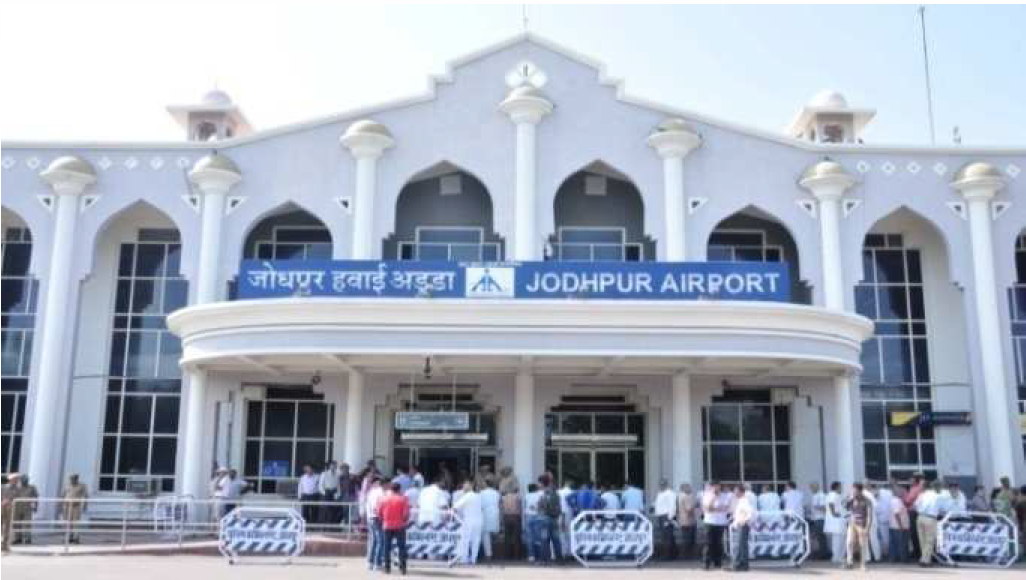
Jodhpur Airport

Jodhpur Airport is one of the prominent airports of Rajasthan. It is primarily a military airbase with a civilian enclosure to allow for civilian air traffic. Due to Jodhpur's strategic location, this airport is regarded as one of the most important ones for the Indian Air Force.

At present, direct flights from Ahmedabad, Belgaum, Bengaluru, Chennai, Delhi, Hyderabad, Indore, Kolkata and Mumbai to the city are operated by Air India, Indigo, SpiceJet, and Star Air.

Construction of new terminal began in late 2023 and is slated to complete by the end of 2025. .

=== Road ===
Jodhpur is connected by road to all major cities in Rajasthan and neighboring states, such as Delhi, Ahmedabad, Surat, Ujjain, and Agra. Apart from deluxe and express bus services to cities within the state, Rajasthan Roadways provides Volvo and Mercedes Benz bus service to Delhi, Ahmedabad, Jaipur, Udaipur, and Jaisalmer. In 2016, Bus Rapid Transit System Jodhpur was launched in the city with low-floor and semi-low-floor buses plying on 6 major routes. Jodhpur is connected to the National Highway network with three national highways and to the Rajasthan State Highway network with 10 state highways.Jodhpur Ring Road is under construction encircling Jodhpur to reduce vehicular traffic.

National highways passing through Jodhpur include:

- NH-62, Ambala-Kaithal-Hissar-Fatehpur-Jodhpur-Pali; total length = 690 km
- NH-112, Junction with NH-14 near Bar connecting Jaitaran-Bilara-Kaparda-Jodhpur-Kalyanpur-Pachpadra-Balotra-Tilwara-Kher-Bagundi-Dhudhwa-Madhasar-Kawas and terminating at its junction with NH 15 near Barmer; total length= 343 km
- NH-114, Junction with NH-65 near Jodhpur connecting Balesar - Dechhu and terminating at its junction with NH-15 near Pokaran; total length= 180 km

State highways passing through Jodhpur are:

- SH-19, Phalodi (NH 15) to Needar via Ahu, Chadi, Pachudi, Nagaur, Tarneu, Khatu Kalan, Khatu khurd, Toshina, Kuchaman City, Bhuni, Maroth, Deoli Minda, Renwal Crossing, Kaladera; total length = 368 km
- SH-21, Dantiweara to Merta City via Pipar City, Borunda; total length = 97 km
- SH-28, Phalodi (NH 15) to Ramji ki Gol via Deeechu, Shergarh, Pachpadra, Balotra, Sindri, Guda Malani; total length = 259 km
- SH-58, Jodhpur to Bheem up to NH 8 via Vinakiya, Rajola Sojat, Rendiri, Bhaisana, Sojat Road, Kantalia, Baban; total length = 142 km
- SH-61, Phalodi (NH 15) to Mandal via Osian, Mathania, Jodhpur, Khejrali, Bhatenda, Saradasamand, Jadan, Marwar Junction, Auwa, Jojawar, Kamalighat, Devgarh, Rajaji ka kareda; total length = 349 km
- SH-62, Bilara to Pindwara via Sojat, Sireeyari, Jojawar, Bagol, Desuri, Sadri, Sewari; total length = 187 km
- SH-63, Banar to Kuchera via Bhopalgarh Asop; total length = 129 km
- SH-65, Sheo (NH 15) to Shergarh via Bhiyad, Barnawa Jagger, Patodi, Phalsoond; total length = 155 km
- SH-66, Siwana to Dhandhaniya (NH 114) via Samdari, Kalyanpur, Mandli Rodhawa Kalan; total length = 90 km
- SH-68, Dangiyawas (NH 112) to Balotra via Kakelao, Khejarli, Guda Kakani, Luni, Dhundhara, Rampura, Samdari; total length = 131 km

==== Bus ====
Paota Bus Stand

General information
- Location: Paota, Jodhpur; RSRTC; India
- Coordinates: 26°17′31.0″N 73°02′21.3″E
- System: Bus Stand
- Owner: RSRTC
- Platforms: 5
- Bus stands: 1
- Bus operators: RSRTC

Construction
- Parking: Yes
- Accessible: Wheelchair

Other information
- Station code: 0291
- Website: rsrtc.rajasthan.gov.in
Location

Paota Bus Stand is the most important bus stand for all government and private buses to and from Jodhpur The route is operated by the RSRTC. This Bus stand serves various rural and urban areas. This is the biggest Bus stand in Jodhpur.

== Sports ==
Jodhpur has two outdoor stadiums and one indoor stadium complex:

- Barkatullah Khan Stadium has hosted two cricket one day internationals matches.
- Maharaja Umaid Singh Stadium and
- Gaushala Maidan Sports Complex

are also among other sports facilities. The city has a well-developed polo ground where tournaments are held occasionally.

S No	Team (A)	Team (B)	Winner	Margin	Year
1	India	Zimbabwe	Zimbabwe	By 1 wicket	2000
2	West Indies	India	India	By 3 wickets	2002

== Media ==
=== Newspapers ===
==== Hindi newspapers ====
- Rajasthan Patrika
- Dainik Bhaskar
- Dainik Navjyoti
- Dainik Jalte Deep

==== English newspapers ====
- The Times of India
- The Hindustan Times
- The Indian Express

=== Radio ===
Jodhpur has these FM stations:

- Big FM
- Red FM
- My FM
- Vividh Bharti
- Radio Mirchi
- All India Radio

== Notable people ==
- Durgadas Rathore
- Major Shaitan Singh, PVC
- Gaj Singh
- Ashok Gehlot
- Kan Singh Parihar
- Dalveer Bhandari
- Dinesh Maheshwari
- Vijay Bishnoi, Chief Justice of Gauhati High Court
- Chitrangada Singh
- Donald Field
- Gajendra Singh Shekhawat
- Shailesh Lodha
- Kiku Sharda
- Ravi Bishnoi
- Mithali Raj
- Brij Bhushan Kabra
- Ustad Sultan Khan
- Karanvir Bohra
- Thakur Bakhtawar Singh
- Vijaydan Detha
- Abhishek Manu Singhvi

== See also ==
- Auwa
- Arid Forest Research Institute (AFRI) Jodhpur
- Dhinga Gavar
- Lordi Daijagra
- Mandore
