= Khejarla =

Village in Rajasthan

Khejarla Khejadla
- Village
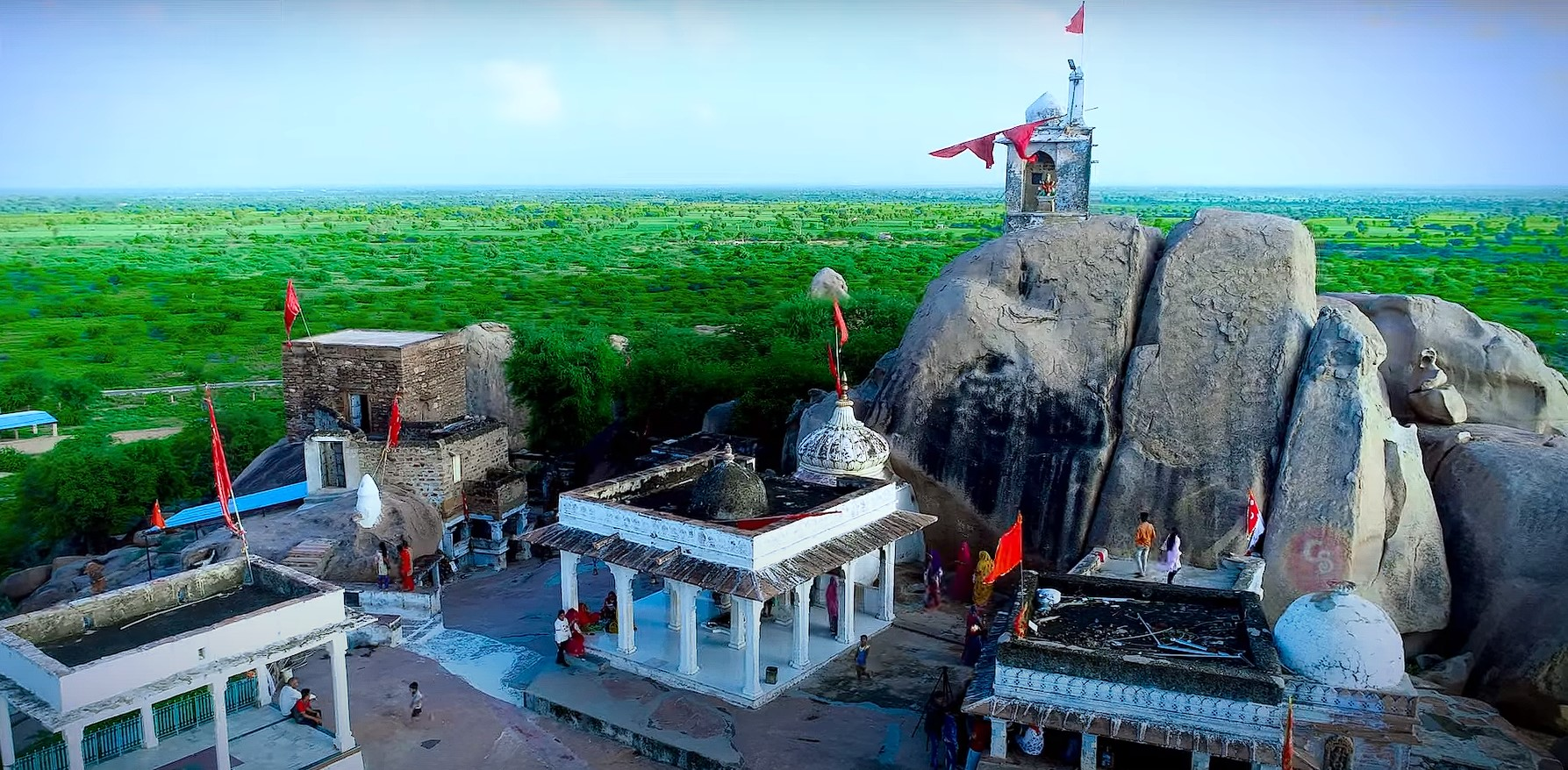
- Bhesad Mata Mandir, Khejarla
- Interactive map of Khejarla
- Location within Rajasthan Location within India Location within Earth
- Coordinates: 26°19′48″N 73°40′55″E
- Gram Panchayat: Khejarla
- Tehsil: Bilara
- District: Jodhpur Rural
- State: Rajasthan
- Country: india
- Assembly constituency: Bilara Assembly constituency
- Lok Sabha constituency: Pali parliamentary constituency
- Nearby City: Bilara, Pipar City and Borunda

Government
  - Type: Gram Panchayat
  - Sarpanch (Village head): Mahendra

Area
  - Village: 3,781 ha (9,340 acres)

Dimensions
  - Length: 5 km (3.1 mi)
  - Width: 7 km (4.3 mi)
- Elevation: 302 m (991 ft)

Population (2011)
  - Village: 7,472
  - Rural: 7,472

Transport Connectivity
  - Nearby Railway Station: Bhawi Railway Station
  - Nearest Airport: Jodhpur Airport

Crops
  - Kharif: Bajra, Maije, Jawar, Groundnut
  - Rabi: Barley, Wheat, Gram, Pulses, Mustard
- Pin Code: 342601
- Post office: Khejarla
- Telephone Code: 02930
- ISO 3166 code: RJ-IN
- Vehicle registration: RJ-19 / RJ-54
- Vernacular language: Marwadi
- Official language: Hindi
- Assembly MLA: Heera Ram Meghwal
- Parliament MP: P. P. Choudhary

Khejarla is a village in Bilara Tehsil of Jodhpur District. It has its own gram panchayat, and is a hotspot of tourists and Rajasthani culture.There are is an ancient fort and an old temple which is known as the Bhesad Mata Temple. The fort, currently operated as a hotel, was constructed in 1611 A.D. by Maharaja Gopal Das Ji. Most of the local population of the village is engaged in subsistence farming. The village's terrain is rich in limestone and marble. Major nearby cities include Bilara, Pipar and Borunda.

== Festivals ==
During Navratri days, a fair is organized in which a huge crowd gathers. This fair has been held for many years. People come to this fair from long distances to have darshan of Bhesad Mata.

== Khejarla fort ==
Khejarla Fort
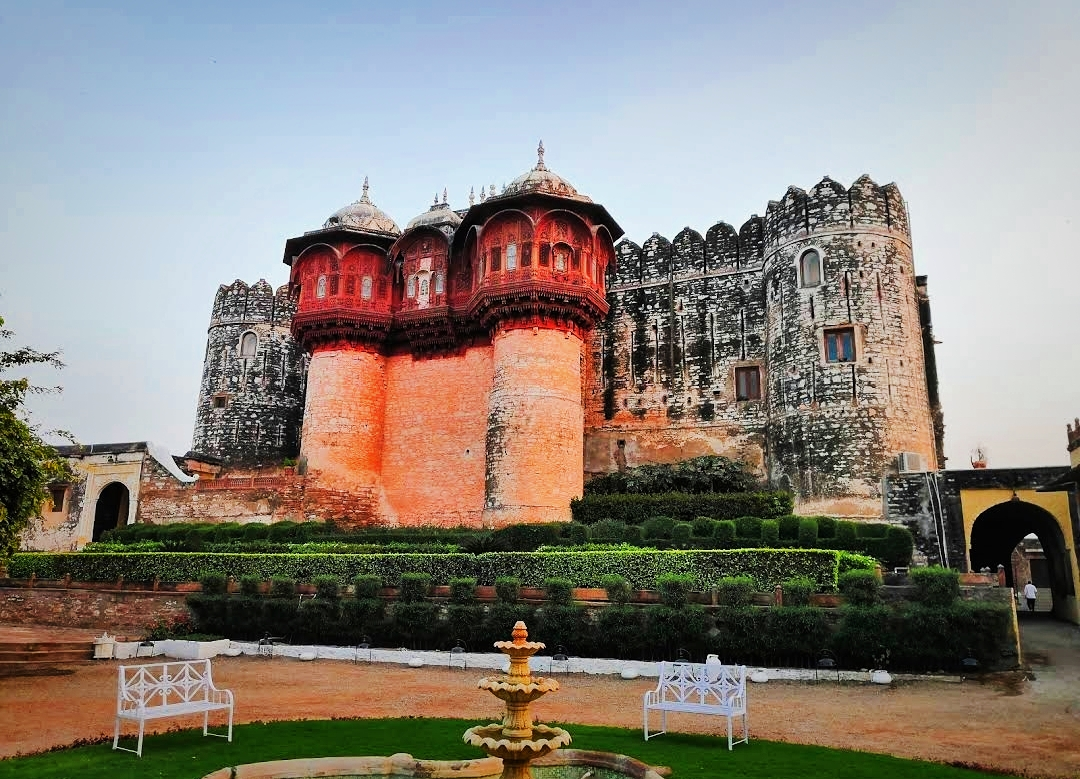
- Fort Khejarla front view
- Interactive map of Khejarla Fort
- 26°19′41″N 73°40′52″E
- Location: Khejarla, Bilara, Jodhpur

History
- Formed: 1611 A.D.
- Founded: Maharajah Gopal Das Ji

Site notes
- Elevation: 302
- Area: 3 Acre
- Visitors: 780 (in 2023)
- Website: www.jodhpurfortkhejarla.com

Khejarla Fort is an ancient fort and heritage site which is located in Khejarla village of Bilara tehsil of Jodhpur district in Rajasthan. This Fort was constructed in 1611 A.D. by Maharaja Gopal Das Ji. This fort is witness of old cultue of rajasthan and its locality. This fort is attraction for foreigners who visits rajasthan. This fort is made from jodhpuri red sand stone. Currently this fort is maintained by Thakur Dileep Singh.

== Agriculture ==
The local agriculture largely depends on rain, with few farmers using a tube well due to the low water level. Villagers prefer farming during the months of June and July. Crops used in Khejarla include Millet, Cumin, Mustard, Wheat, and Moong.

== Colony ==
Colonies of this village include:

- New Bus Stand
- Kumharo ka baas
- Jaato ka baas
- old bus Stand

== Schools and hospitals ==
In Khejarla, there are several state owned schools as well as private schools and hospitals.

=== Schools ===
These schools are RBSE affiliated.

- Government Senior Secondary School, Khejarla
- Sumer School, Khejarla
- Tagore School, Khejarla
- Dayanand saraswati School, Khejarla

=== Hospitals ===
State owned and private hospitals are spread throughout the village, although for major treatment they are depend on nearby major cities like Bilara and Piper.

- Government hospital
- Ashok Medical
- Jaato ka baas
- old bus Stand

== Nearby villages ==
Khejarla as a gram panchayat covers the following villages under its administration:

- Ghanamangra
- Ghodawat
- Ransigaon
- Birawas
- Hariyada
- Roonkiya
- Chirdhani
- Raniwal
- Pichiyak
- Khariya Mithapur
- Khariya Aanawas
- Jhurli
- Ber Kalan
- Prithvipura
- Garniya
- Bhavi
