= Kuri, Bhopalgarh =

Kuri Kudi
- village
- Location in Rajasthan, India Kuri (India)
- Coordinates: 26°39′17″N 73°29′45″E
- Country: India
- State: Rajasthan
- District: Jodhpur
- Tehsil: Bhopalgarh
- Established: 1923
- Elevation: 308 m (1,010 ft)

Population (2011)
  - Total: 3,241

Languages
  - Official: Marwari
- Time zone: UTC+5:30 (IST)
- ISO 3166 code: RJ-IN
- Vehicle registration: RJ-19

Kuri is a village located in the Bhopalgarh tehsil of the Jodhpur District of the State of Rajasthan in western India.

== About ==
Kuri is a large village in the Bhopalgarh tehsil of the Jodhpur District of the State of Rajasthan, India. It is located 62 km to the east of the Jodhpur District headquarters, 13 km from Bhopalgarh and 277 km from the state capital of Jaipur

Kuri Pin code is 342606 and postal head office is Pipar Road.

Near Kuri are the cities of Pipar City, Phalodi, Bilara, and Jodhpur.

== Population ==
According to 2011 census, the Kuri population is

Male Population 1675
Female Population 1566

Total Population 3241

== Language ==
Marwari is the dominant local language and Hindi is used.

== Geography ==
It is among the larger villages of the area:

Tambariya Kalan (8 km)
Bhundana (9 km)
Malar (9 km)
Kagal (10 km)
Dewatra (11 km)
Sopra (6 km)

Surrounding Kuri is:

West - Mandor tehsil
West - Jodhpur tehsil
South - Bilara tehsil
East - Kharchi (Mar.Jun) tehsil

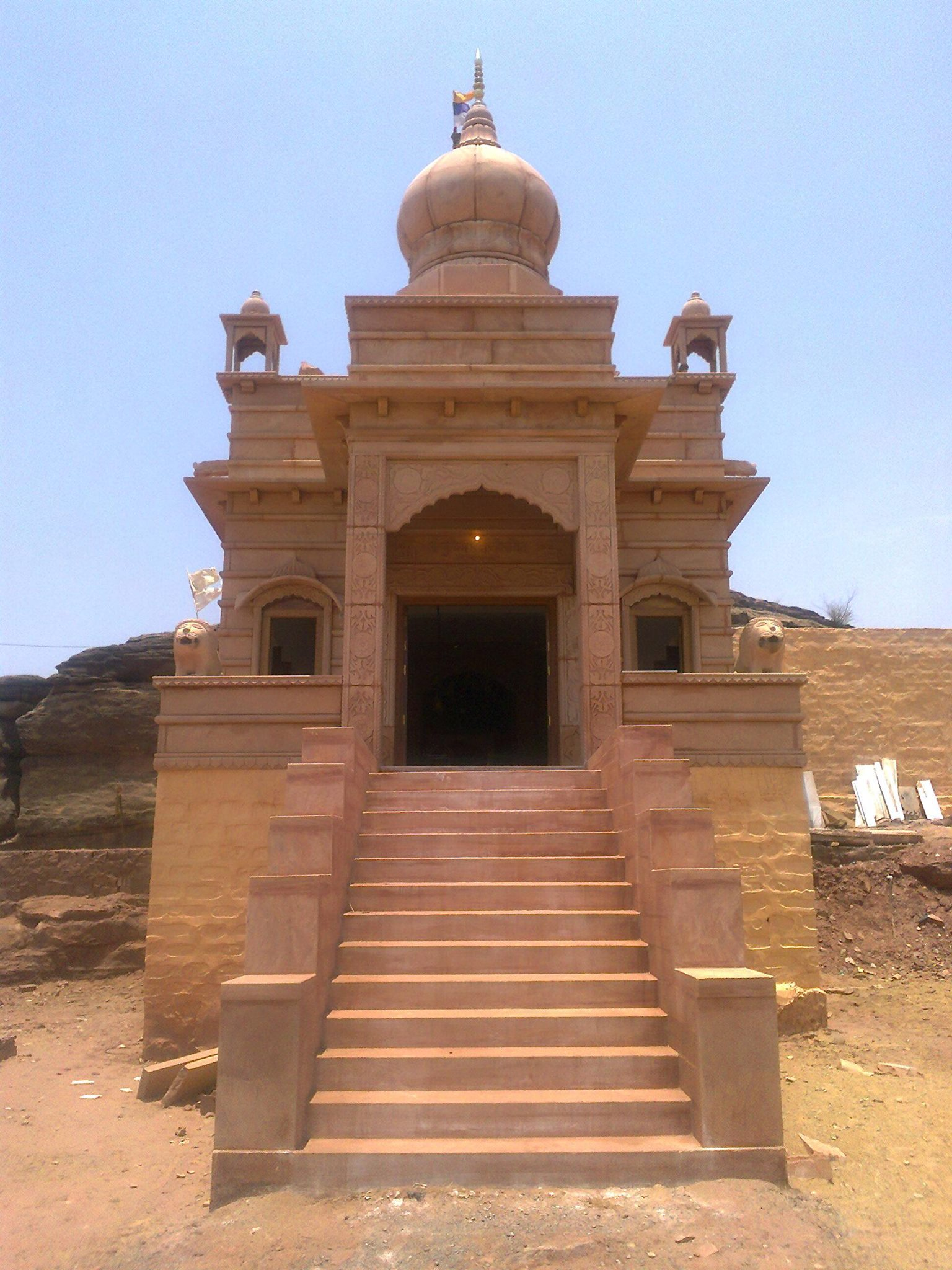
Nathji Bhakar

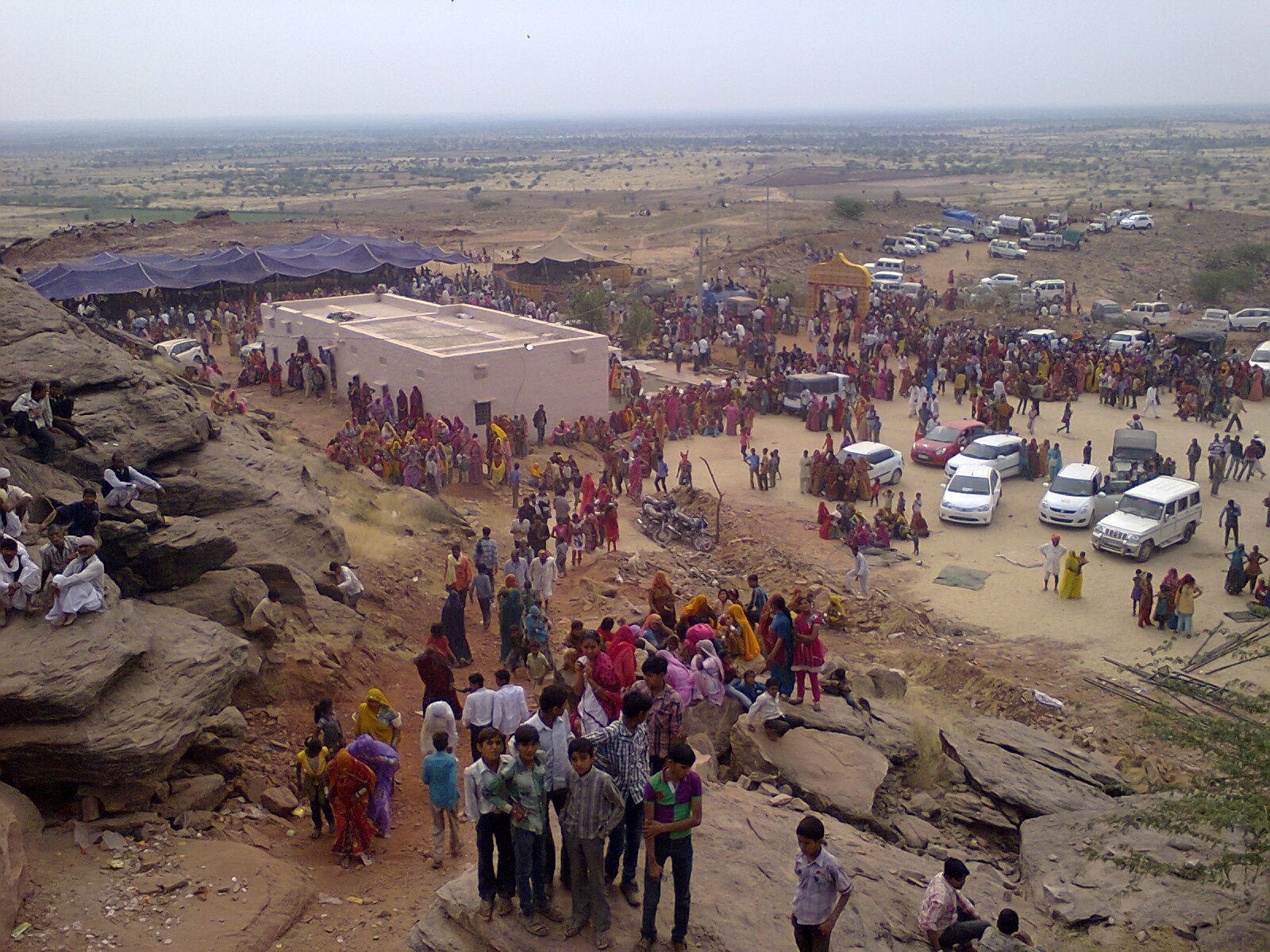
Nathji Bhakar

== Transportation ==
By Road

State highway 65 from Jodhpur

By Rail

Sathin Road railway station is the very nearby railway station to Kuri. However Mahamandir railway station is major railway station 55 km near to Kuri.

== Schools in Kuri ==
- Shree Veer Teja Secondary School, Kuri
- Government secondary school kuri

== Temples in Kuri ==
Village is inhabited by mostly Hindus along with a few Islam followers.

- Shri Sujannathji Temple

There are many temples in the village spread across its length and breadth dedicated to various Gods and Goddesses. But the main temple is dedicated to a Shiva follower, Shri Sujannathji Maharaj, located in the older heart of village. It has transformed from being just an ordinary main sanctum to full-fledged place for public discussions. The place is visited by villagers occasionally.

Among other important temples are,

- Ramdev Temple
- Bhomiaji Maharaj (Near village Pond)
- Hanuman Temple

and many small chattris spread around.

Over the hill (Nathji Bhakar) located on the outskirts of the village, on Sopra-Kuri boundary, is a remarkable recently built temple dedicated to 'Gunjiya Mata' along with the cave where Shri sujannathji use to meditate.
