= Ramnarayan Dudi =

Indian politician (born 1948)

Ram Narayan Dudi
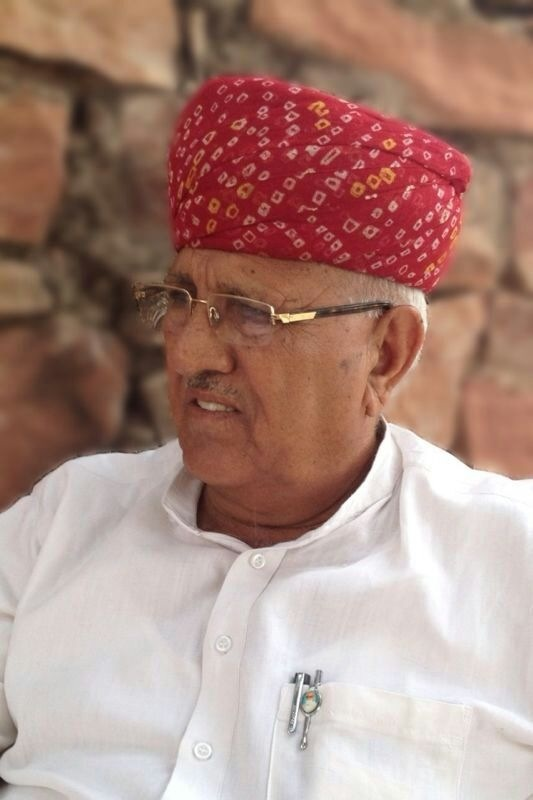

Member of Parliament, Rajya Sabha
- In office 10 April 2014 – 9 April 2020
- Constituency: Rajasthan

Member of the Rajasthan Legislative Assembly
- In office 1977 - 1985, 1993 - 1998, 2003 - 2008

Minister of Revenue and Soldiers Welfare Government of Rajasthan
- In office 2003 to 2008

Personal details
- Born: 10 September 1948 (age 78)
- Party: Bharatiya Janata Party
- Other political affiliations: Indian National Congress
- Spouse: Dhapu Devi
- Children: 3

Ram Narayan Dudi (born 10 September 1948) is an Indian politician. He served as the Member of Parliament, Rajya Sabha from 2014 to 2020. He served as the minister of Revenue, Colonisation & Soldier welfare in Government of Rajasthan from 2003 to 2008. He was elected to the Rajasthan Legislative Assembly for four terms from Bilara and Bhopalgarh assembly in Pali, Rajasthan.

== Early life and education ==
Ram Narayan Dudi was born on 10 September 1948 in the family of Ganga Ram Dudi at Ratkuria village in Jodhpur district of Rajasthan. He did Master of Arts from Jodhpur University in 1971.

== Political career ==
Dudi was elected to the Rajasthan legislative assembly for first term in 1977 from Bilara assembly, and then in 1980 from the same constituency as a member of Indian National Congress. He then contested the 1993, Rajasthan assembly election from Bhopalgarh and won the seat as a member of Indian National Congress. Later he joined Bharatiya Janata Party and won the 2003 Rajasthan Assembly elections from Bilara assembly in the Pali district of Rajasthan. He served as the minister of Revenue, Colonisation & Soldier welfare in Government of Rajasthan from 2003 to 2008. He was member of Rajya Sabha from 2014 to 2020 from Rajasthan.
