= Jelva =

- Village
- Jelva in Rajasthan Jelva (India)
- Coordinates: 26.115793°N 73.660544°E
- Country: India
- State: Rajasthan
- District: Jodhpur
- Tehsile: Bilara
- Gram Panchayat: Bijasani

Government
  - Sarpanch: Mrs. Rekha Devi Banjara

Population (2001)
  - Total: Approx 1,000

Languages
  - Official: Hindi
  - locally: Marwari
- Time zone: UTC+5:30 (IST)
- Postal Code: 342602
- STD code: 02930
- Vehicle registration: RJ 19

Jelva is a village in Bilara Town, Jodhpur District, Rajasthan state, India. It is approximately 90 km from the main city of Jodhpur. It is well connected with surrounding villages and cities by roads. It is connected with city line electricity (almost round the clock electricity). It shares the border with Jetiwas to the south, Tharasni to the west, Bilara to the north and Atbara to the east.

== Climate ==
The climate of Jelva is generally hot and semi-arid, but has a rainy season from late June to September.

== Profession ==
It is an agriculturally dominating village but due to the lowering of ground water table and an increase in hardness, farming is becoming less popular. The people are rapidly switching their profession to business, mostly in the retail sector.

The crops cultivated are wheat, cotton, cumin (jeera), fennel (saunf), guar, pearl millet (बाजरी), sorghum (jowar), fenugreek (methi), etc.

== Elected representatives ==
Currently Mrs. Rekha Devi Banjara is sarpanch of the village, preceded by Mr. Mahendra Singh Purohit.
