= Raniwal (Rajasthan) =

Village in Rajasthan, India

Raniwal Ranilwal
- Village
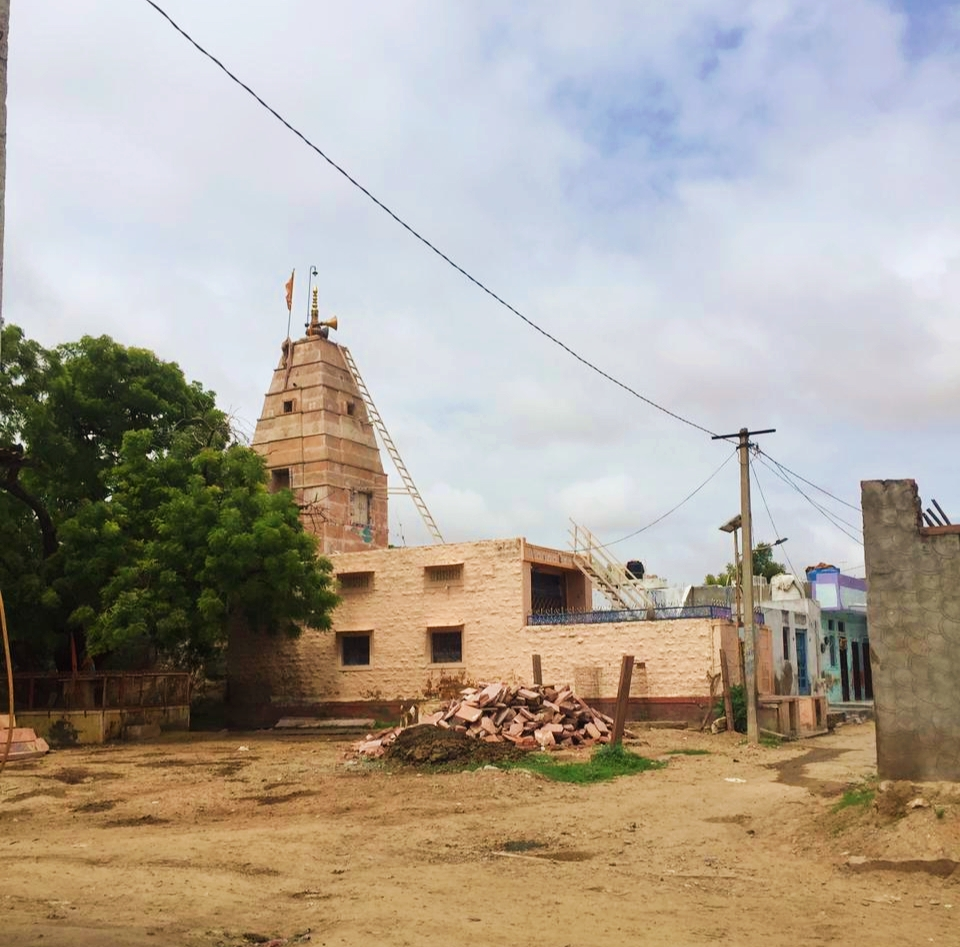
- Mahadev Mandir in Raniwal
- Raniwal in Jaitaran
- Location within Rajasthan Location within India Location within Earth
- Coordinates: 26°14′2.02″N 73°51′20.09″E
- Gram Panchayat: Garniya
- Tehsil: Jaitaran
- District: Beawer
- State: Rajasthan
- Country: india
- Assembly constituency: Jaitaran Assembly constituency
- Lok Sabha constituency: Rajsamand parliamentary constituency
- Nearby City: Bilara, Jaitaran and Borunda

Government
  - Type: Gram Panchayat
  - Sarpanch (Village head): Guddi

Area
  - Village: 1,601 ha (3,960 acres)

Dimensions
  - Length: 4 km (2.5 mi)
  - Width: 5 km (3.1 mi)
- Elevation: 345 m (1,132 ft)

Population (2011)
  - Village: 1,528
  - Rural: 1,528
- Pin Code: 306302
- Post office: Raniwal
- Telephone Code: 02939
- ISO 3166 code: RJ-IN
- Vehicle registration: RJ-22
- Vernacular language: Marwadi
- Official language: Hindi
- Assembly MLA: Avinash
- Parliament MP: Diya Kumari

Raniwal is a village in the Jaitaran tehsil of Beawar district in Rajasthan. It belongs to the Garniya gram panchayatn and is 4 km from the Jaipur-Jodhpur National Highway (NH 25).
