= Bhopalgarh tehsil =

Bhopalgarh Tahsil
- tehsil
- Interactive map of Bhopalgarh Tahsil
- Location in Rajasthan, India Bhopalgarh Tahsil (India)
- Coordinates: 26°35′N 073°33′E
- Country: India
- State: Rajasthan
- District: Jodhpur
- Time zone: UTC+5:30 (IST)
- Telephone code: 02920
- ISO 3166 code: RJ-IN
- Vehicle registration: RJ-
- Lok Sabha constituency: Pali
- Vidhan Sabha constituency: Bhopalgarh (SC)

Bhopalgarh tehsil is a tehsil in Jodhpur District of Rajasthan state in western India. Headquarters for the tehsil is the town of Bhopalgarh. Bhopalgarh tehsil is an eastern tehsil among the 13 tehsils in Jodhpur District. It borders Nagaur District to the north and east, Pipar city tehsil to the south, Jodhpur tehsil to the southwest, and Bawadi tehsil to the west. Bhopalgarh panchayat samiti has 35 gram panchayats & 116 villages. Bhopalgarh tehsil has a total area of 174623.74 hectares with total cultivable area of 63.92% of total area & 21.27% of total cultivable area as irrigated area as per land use 2011.

== Demographics ==
As per 2011 census of India, Bhopalgarh tehsil had a total population of 2,71,567 in 2001 which increased to 3,20,952 in 2011 showing a percentage decadal variation of 18.19%. Bhopalgarh tehsil had an overall sex ratio of 938 in 2011. In 2011 in Bhopalgarh, 100% of the households were rural. Bhopalgarh tehsil has a Scheduled caste population of 69,580 & Scheduled tribe population of 2,876 which account for 21.68% & 0.9% of total population as of 2011. Scheduled caste population percentage (21.68%) over total population of Bhopalgarh tehsil is highest in Jodhpur district.

Bhopalgarh tehsil has a literacy rate of 74.58% for males & 38.97% for females with overall literacy rate being 57.24%. Bhopalgarh tehsil has main workers, marginal workers & total workers percentage of 31.28%, 17.41% & 48.69% respectively over total population of tehsil. It has the highest percentage of female total workers in Jodhpur district with a percentage of 45.91%. Out of the total workers in Bhopalgarh tehsil 56.17% account for agriculture cultivators, 23.44% account for agricultural labourers & 1.68% account for household industry workers &18.71% account for other workers.

== Villages ==
There are thirty-nine panchayat villages in Bhopalgarh tehsil.

- Artiya Kalla (Artiya Kalan)
- Asop
- Bagoria (Bagoriya)
- Bara Kalla (Bara Kalan)
- Barni Kallan
- Barni Khurd
- Basni Hari Singh (Basni Harisingh)
- Basni Khariya
- Bhopalgarh
- Bhundana
- Birani
- Burkia (Budkiya)
- Chowkari Kalla (Chaukri Kalan)
- Dewatra
- Gaj Singhpura (Gajsinghpura)
- Garasani
- Heeradesar (Hiradesar)
- Jasnagar Basni Khariya
- Kagal
- Khangta (Khangata)
- Kharia Khangar (Khariya Khangar)
- Kheri charna
- Khwaspura (Khawaspura)
- Kood (Kur, Koor)
- Kosana
- Kuri
- Malar, Bhopalgarh
- Mangeria (Mangeriya)
- Nagalwas
- Narsar (Nadsar)
- Ostra (Ustra)
- Palri Ranawata
- Palri Sidha (Palri Siddha)
- Rajlani
- Ramdawas Kalla (Ramrawas Kalan)
- Rampura
- Rarod
- Ratkuria (Ratkuriya)
- Rudia (Rudiya)
- Salwa Khurd
- Satheen
- Sopara
- Surpura Khurd

== Notes ==
6.http://www.censusindia.gov.in/2011census/dchb/DCHB_A/08/0815_PART_A_DCHB_JODHPUR.pdf
