= Kacholiya Nada =

- Town
- Country: India
- State: Rajasthan
- Founder: Banaram Ji Mar

Government
  - Type: Indian Government

Population
  - Total: 50 Families

Languages
  - Official: Hindi
- Time zone: UTC+5:30 (IST)
- ISO 3166 code: RJ-IN
- Vehicle registration: RJ
- Website: http://www.ratkuria.byethost11.com/

Kacholiya Nada is a small town in Bhopalgarh tehsil, Jodhpur district, Rajasthan. Its PIN code is 342606. It is the location of Banaram Ji Mar Temple & A Govt Primary School And Apart from that famous religious places 'Bholaram ji ki Devri' and 'Bhuriya Baba ki Tikhi' are also located Near this town and this town comes under Ratkuria Village
