= Pipar City railway station =

Railway station in Rajasthan

Pipar City

General information
- Location: Piparcity, Jodhpur district, Rajasthan; India
- Coordinates: 26.374519°N 73.531475°E
- System: Indian Railways station
- Owner: Indian Railways
- Operator: North Western Railway
- Line: Pipar Road–Bilara line
- Platforms: 1
- Tracks: 1

Construction
- Structure type: Standard (on ground station)
- Parking: Yes

Other information
- Status: Functioning
- Station code: PCY
- Zone(s): North Western Railway
- Division(s): Jodhpur
Location
- Location within India Location within Rajasthan

Pipar City railway station is a railway station in Jodhpur district, Rajasthan. Its code is PCY. It serves Piparcity. The station consists of a single platform. Passenger trains halt here.
