= Sopra =

Sopra may refer to:

- Sopra Steria, a consulting, IT services and software development company
- Sopra, Bhopalgarh, a village in India
