= Bilara railway station =

Railway station in Rajasthan, India

Bilara

General information
- Location: Bilara, Jodhpur district, Rajasthan; India
- Coordinates: 26.186165°N 73.700074°E
- System: Indian Railways station
- Owner: Indian Railways
- Operator: North Western Railway
- Line: Bilara–Pipar Road line
- Platforms: 2
- Tracks: 2

Construction
- Structure type: Standard (on ground station)
- Parking: Yes

Other information
- Status: Operating
- Station code: BARA
- Zone(s): North Western Railway
- Division(s): Jodhpur
Location
- Location within India Location within Rajasthan

Bilara railway station is a railway station in Jodhpur district, Rajasthan, India. Its code is BARA. It serves Bilara city. The station consists of 2 platforms. Passenger trains start from here.

== Trains ==
The following trains start from Bilara railway station:

- Bilara–Jodhpur Passenger
