= Bagoriya =

Village in Jodhpur, Rajasthan, India

Bagoriya Bagoriya
- Village
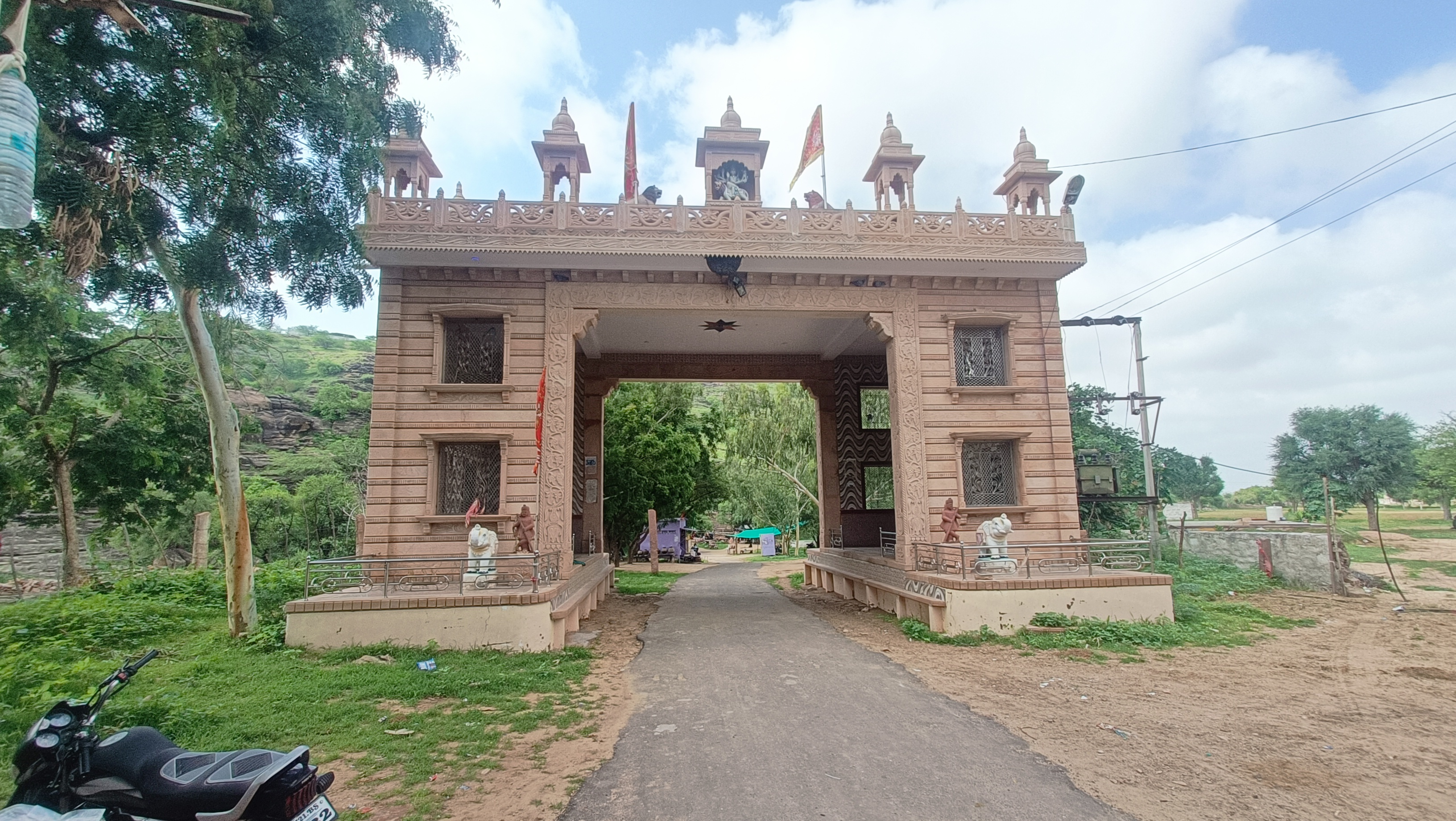
- Bagoriya Mata Temple, Bhopalgarh
- Interactive map of Bagoriya
- Location within Rajasthan Location within India Location within Earth
- Coordinates: 26°35′46.3″N 73°29′58.2″E
- Gram Panchayat: Bagoriya
- Tehsil: Bhopalgarh
- District: Jodhpur Rural
- State: Rajasthan
- Country: india
- Assembly constituency: Bhopalgarh Assembly constituency
- Lok Sabha constituency: Pali parliamentary constituency
- Nearby City: Bhopalgarh, Pipar

Government
  - Type: Gram Panchayat
  - Sarpanch (Village head): Arjun Singh

Area
  - Village: 1,361 ha (3,360 acres)

Dimensions
  - Length: 8 km (5.0 mi)
  - Width: 12 km (7.5 mi)
- Elevation: 302 m (991 ft)

Population (2011)
  - Village: 2,581
  - Rural: 7,472

Transport Connectivity
  - Nearby Railway Station: Pipar Railway Station
  - Nearest Airport: Jodhpur Airport

Crops
  - Kharif: Bajra, Maije, Jawar, Groundnut
  - Rabi: Barley, Wheat, Gram, Pulses, Mustard
- Pin Code: 342603
- Post office: Bagoriya
- Telephone Code: 02930
- ISO 3166 code: RJ-IN
- Vehicle registration: RJ-19 / RJ-54
- Vernacular language: Marwadi
- Official language: Hindi
- Assembly MLA: Geeta Barwar
- Parliament MP: P. P. Choudhary

Bagoriya is a village located in Bhopalgarh Tehsil of Jodhpur District in Rajasthan. As of 2011, it has a population of 2,581. There is an ancient old temple known as Bagoriya Mata Temple, a Muslim Pujari temple situated on a hill. The main source of income for the inhabitants is farming. The village has rich farming soil and ground water level is low.
