= Sangeet Raj Lodha =

Judge of Rajasthan High Court

Hon'ble Justice Sangeet Raj Lodha

Judge of Rajasthan High Court
- Incumbent
- Assumed office 5 July 2007
- Appointed by: A.P.J Abdul Kalam

Personal details
- Born: 13 October 1959 (age 66) Jodhpur, Rajasthan

Sangeet Raj Lodha (born 13 October 1959) is a retired judge of Rajasthan High Court. He was the senior-most judge of the Rajasthan High Court after the Chief Justice of Rajasthan High Court, till his retirement on 13 October 2021. The Supreme Court of India in 2022, conferred the position of Senior Advocate to Justice Lodha and 50 other retired judges of various High Courts of India, as per the provision of Section-16(2) of the Advocate's Act, 1961.

Prior to elevation as Justice of Rajasthan High Court, he was a practicing lawyer in the Rajasthan High Court. His areas of specialization are - Constitutional, Civil and Tax matters. He was elevated to the post of Judge of Rajasthan High Court on 5 July 2007. In 2021, a judgement by Justice Lodha and Justice Rameshwar Vyas's Division Bench declared the levy of advance fees by medical colleges illegal. In 2019, he refused to hear Asaram's plea for parole to meet his sick wife. When the Aam Aadmi Party was in power in Delhi in 2023, the Government of Delhi recommended the name of Justice Lodha as the Chairman of Delhi Electricity Regulatory Commission (DERC). However, the said recommendation was not accepted.

In 2025, Justice Lodha was appointed by the Supreme Court of India to chair a High-Level Ecosystem Oversight Committee tasked with preparing a time-bound restoration roadmap for Rajasthan’s Jojari, Bandi, and Luni river systems. The committee comprises experts in water management and pollution control, senior officials from the Rajasthan State Pollution Control Board and the Central Pollution Control Board, representatives of industrial development authorities, and district administrators from Jodhpur, Pali, and Balotra.
