= Arjun Lal Garg =

Indian politician

Member of the Rajasthan Legislative Assembly
- Incumbent
- Assumed office 3 December 2023
- Preceded by: Heera Ram
- Constituency: Bilara

Personal details
- Party: Bharatiya Janata Party

Arjun Lal Garg (born 1960) is an Indian politician from Rajasthan. He is a member of the Rajasthan Legislative Assembly from Bilara Assembly constituency, which is reserved for Scheduled Caste community, in Jodhpur district. He won the 2023 Rajasthan Legislative Assembly election representing the Bharatiya Janata Party.

== Early life and education ==
Garg is from Bilara, Jodhpur district, Rajasthan. He is the son of Gokul Ram. He studied Class 11 in 1975 at Government Higher Secondary School, Bilara and later discontinued his studies. He passed the Class 10 examinations conducted by Madhyamik Shiksha Board, Ajmer, Rajasthan in 1974. He later did a diploma in civil engineering at Jodhpur Political College in 1978.

== Career ==
Garg won from Bilara Assembly constituency representing the Bharatiya Janata Party in the 2023 Rajasthan Legislative Assembly election. He polled 90,766 votes and defeated his nearest rival, Mohanlal Katariya of the Indian National Congress, by a margin of 10,424 votes. He first became an MLA winning the 2008 Rajasthan Legislative Assembly election from Bilara representing the Bharatiya Janata Party. He retained the seat for BJP in the 2013 Rajasthan Legislative Assembly election. He lost the 2018 Assembly election to Heeraram of the Indian National Congress but became an MLA for the third time in 2023.
