= Chandi Dan Detha =

Indian agriculturalist

Padma Shri Chandi Dan Detha
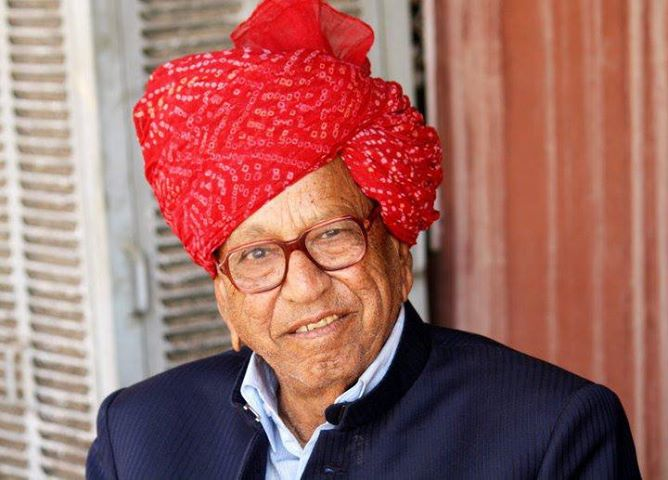

Sarpanch of Borunda Gram Panchayat
- In office 1955–1975

Personal details
- Born: Borunda
- Died: 28 July 2024
- Relations: Vijaydan Detha
- Occupation: Agriculturist; Politician
- Awards: Padma Shri (1967)

Chandi Dan Detha (died 28 July 2024) was an Indian agriculturalist and Padma Shri recipient who is known for pioneering work in the field of agriculture and transforming the desert village of Borunda. Chandi Dan was elected the first Sarpanch of the village panchayat in 1955 and served four terms till he retired. He is also known for founding the premier Rajasthani folklore institute, Rupayan Sansthan. He was also a member of the Research Advisory Committee (GOI).

== Agricultural revolution in Borunda ==
Chandidan had heard many traditional proverbs indicating that the well whose water is free from algae and smell or stink is supposed to be an artesian well (patalphod kua), with unlimited store of water. Later on, he was inspired by news of a group of scientists discovering water 100 ft. below the sandy level, which gave him an idea to explore old wells in his village in search of such artesian well with an unlimited store of water.

=== Reaching the water (1948–50) ===
Chandidan tested the water of his inherited well and found it suitable, so he decided to install a diesel pump set at a depth of 110 ft. These attempts of Chandidan and his seven brothers were met with disbelief and criticism when they began to dig a well in the basalt-filled land, with religious men warning them that it would bring the wrath of God upon their heads.

Chandidan had an idea to install a diesel engine in a chamber constructed at the depth of 100 feet in the wall of the well. But, the Detha brothers quickly realized that they lacked the knowledge and tools necessary to achieve success. So, Chandidan hired an engineer from Jodhpur, using the last of his funds. The brothers worked day and night under the engineer's direction, and on a good day they could dig through 50 or 60 centimetres. However, the advance began to slow down even more after the first few metres. They then had to hire some workers. A man who was lowered 100 metres into the depths of the well would demand to be brought up almost immediately due to lack of air and fear of the pitch darkness. The engineer left, for there was no more money to pay him, and one of the rocks they had to penetrate to get to water was impregnated with sulfur. The temperature was just as high as on the surface. Nevertheless, the brothers succeeded in reaching the water – pure and surprisingly delicious.

Priests warned against drinking the water from the well, but Chandidan was able to pump it out and irrigate the land, proving the sceptics wrong as the barren desert became incredibly fertile with luxuriant vegetation.

When the water started rushing out, this sight filled me with a unique sense of pride and joy. The village folk who till the other day used to discourage me, were taken aback and were inspired to follow suit.

=== Elected as Sarpanch (1955) ===
New enthusiasts joined Chandidan and began to settle on any plot of land they found. The Detha brothers started working on more wells. Across the fields, water mains and irrigation channels were built. In no time, 400 families had settled in the village, and Chandidan was elected chairman of their Panchayat in 1955 and later awarded Padma Shri in 1967 for his services. Chandidan had initially started his experiment in 1950 by installing a 29 H.P. diesel pump to lift underground water and eventually more than a dozen pump sets were installed in the village. This assured the village of water supply throughout the year and the irrigated area in Borunda, in time, was raised from 4,000 bighas to 23,000 bighas.

In carrying water from the well to distant fields, Chandidan showed great enterprise through the construction of a 3000 feet long 6" pipe line and various channels, as well as reclaiming a low lying area known as 'Sar' by digging out an existing canal, which has released a vast area for dry cultivation of wheat and gram. Soon afterwards, a 6,000 foot long pipeline was laid and taps were installed in the streets and houses in order to solve their drinking water problem.

Agriculture in Borunda included production of various crops including paddy, grapes, wheat, bajra, jowar, and other cereals. Almost all of the land holdings were consolidated and 7,000 bighas of land was irrigated through pucca and kutcha channels, 3 miles and 25 miles away respectively.

To promote irrigation work, Chandidan organized a cooperative society and sought assistance from the state government. The youths provided voluntary labor to construct irrigation channels, and new varieties of seeds and fertilizers were purchased collectively.

He also introduced high-yielding varieties, fertilisers and modern implements to the farmers, transforming the barren land into a green verdour.

== As Sarpanch of Borunda ==
Chandidan won the first panchayat elections of Borunda held after the Indian independence. After two years of planning and effort as the first Sarpanch of Borunda, Detha constructed an elaborate water-supply system in Borunda, consisting of three power-fitted wells, a huge reservoir, and a wide network of pipelines with taps fitted in every street and house. By 1957 Chandidan was described as a youthful Sarpanch of Borunda, highly efficient and a progressive leader, who had transformed the village into one of the most prosperous and progressive of the two hundred and odd villages in the Bilara Block. Encouraged by its success, authorities in Bilara block also tried replicating successful Borunda programme in other villages.

Earlier the village of Borunda was very poor and had a lot of problems. Every year, famine would come and the farmers and cattle moved from Malwa to Bombay and even upto Delhi in search of food and fodder. People also got sick with smallpox and other diseases, and those who could afford it would go to Jodhpur, which was sixty miles away, for medical treatment. Only one crop was grown each year, making the situation even worse.

Early in his administration of the Borunda panchayat, in 1957, responding to the question of progress of Community Development programmes running block-wide, despite difficulties and failures, expressed optimism and Chandidan said,

"We have given the people wells and seeds and new implements. It is alright. We should now give them new ideas and values. We are bound to run up against prejudices....Look at the number of young village leaders that are coming up, look at the increasing power and prestige of our Panchayats, look at the decrease in the fear of authority among ordinary people, and the new spirit of self-reliance that is coming up; and above all, how could we have so many new buildings for schools and Panchayats and so many new roads without the willing participation of the people. Come again after a few years and you will see for yourself what I mean."

=== Administrative and Infrastructural advances ===
Chandidan recounted the remarkable transformation of his village between 1950 and 1967. This period was a time of tremendous progress, with many tube-wells being fitted with diesel engines, the village being electrified, an area of 7,000 bighas of land coming under irrigation, and the annual income of the village jumping from Rs. 50,000 in 1950 to a staggering Rs. 2.5 million in 1967. In 1962, the village was electrified and out of 17 wells 11 were installed with electric pump. It was a period of unprecedented growth and development in the village, which resulted in a substantial rise in the quality of life of the villagers.

By 1972, Borunda had around 200–250 wells, with 30–35 of them using two or three motors to draw water from a 170-foot deep pipe of 8 inches [CONVERT]. It provided unrestricted access to water, and in the span of 20 years, the villagers' incomes had grown from 50,000 rupees to 11 million rupees. The village paid 6–700,000 rupees per year to the Electricity Board for the electricity used to power the wells, which ran for 24 hours a day, and the Electricity Board had laid a separate 33 thousand kilowatt line to meet the village's needs.

A market was developed including 10–15 shops selling essential items, tea, bidi, cigarettes, and liquor, with a total monthly income of 6–15 thousand rupees. Due to the rising economy of Borunda, some 2,000 people from nearby villages had temporarily settled in Borunda for employment.

To facilitate the advanced resources of agriculture, the Central Bank of India opened a branch here in 1969. This branch further helped in improving the economic condition of the farmers here with its loan facility. In the short period of two years, the branch had provided a loan facility of 1.3 million rupees in the form of crop loans. With the help of the bank, the farmers also constructed 25 modern granaries.

The Panchayat under Chandidan took a proactive role in the village administration. Despite the economic progress, people had rarely stepped out of the village. No one had seen a court yet, there was no police station either: the panchayat took care of all the issues. The panchayat also took steps to root out the superstitions, ignorance and other social evils. Necessary services such as mail were made available to all.

A government dispensary with a doctor and nurses was established in 1960 with usage rates that were three times those in comparable rural dispensaries in Jodhpur district. Chandidan had also planned and built a bus station, a hotel, a shopping centre, and a hospital in the further expansion of Borunda.

The material prosperity and the change in the outlook of the people was reflected in the neat and clean houses lining the streets, with soak-pits provided in front of every portal. Even the Raikas, a poor and backward people, raised many pucca houses and compounds for their sheep, which increased to more than 15,000 due to increased grazing facilities.

== Accolades ==
=== Mati Ban Gai Sona ===
The Films Division of the Information and Broadcasting Ministry featured a film Mati Ban Gai Sona (soil became gold) in 1959 depicting the struggle and transformation of the village.

=== Padma Shri ===
In 1967, Chandidan Detha was awarded the Padma Shri in Science and Engineering by President of India, Dr. Radhakrishnan.

== Educational Institutes ==
Apart from giving a lead in the field of agricultural production, Chandidan stepped into the field of education as well. The erstwhile jagirdar and tahsildar were initially scared of the idea of establishing a primary school in the village ten years ago, but the village now boasts a higher secondary school with 600 students and a girl school, thanks to the efforts of Chandidan in agricultural production and education.

== Folklore Institute: Rupayan Sansthan ==
Around 1960, under the leadership of Chandidan, Rupayan Sansthan, a literary institution for the Rajasthani folklore was established along with a printing press, through which collections of Rajasthani folk tales were published in a monthly magazine named 'Vani'. He also served as the institute's first Chairman. (Note: Chandi Dan, a 38-year-old who was elected Sarpanch for the fourth time, has invested a lakh of rupees from his farm earnings to found a Folk Art Centre in Borunda.) The institute has been working for the preservation of Rajasthani language, culture, art, music and literature. The centre became a bustling hub of literary endeavours focused on folk culture. The centre has since published multiple massive volumes of Rajasthani folktales, as part of a larger project. This series included tales from the more than 12,000 collected by the centre under the direction of two renowned authors, Vijaydan Detha and Komal Kothari.

Borunda was seen as revolutionizing the countryside as well as contributing to cultural change. Thus, the state wide Rajasthani writers conference in 1972 was held in Borunda instead of the capital.

=== Bataan ri Phulwari ===
The institution collected and recorded a large number of folk tales, folk songs, puzzles, and sayings, etc. These were collected and written down by Vijaydan Detha. Of these, many of the Rajasthani folk tales have been published in several volumes under the title "Bataan ri Phulwari". Additionally, these tales were translated into Hindi and published in the monthly magazine "Lok Sanskruti". Some of these stories and novels have been adapted in films such as Mani Kaul's Duvidha (1973), Habib Tanvir and Shyam Benegal's Charandas Chor (1975), etc.

== Quote ==
At being asked for his secret behind his success in Borunda, Chandidan replied,

It is nothing but the cooperation of our youth and a strong will power. More often than not, the old generation with its superstitious ideas discouraged me and ridiculed my efforts. I don't blame these poor old heads – it was the outcome of the age-old ignorance. But I am glad that I have been able to convince them that the present generation is capable of making up all the lapses of the past generation. We are going to leave a far better country than that we had obtained from our forefathers.

== Bibliography ==
- Timberg, Thomas A. (1981). "Berunda: A Case of Exhausted Development". Economic and Political Weekly. 16 (8): 265–265. ISSN 0012-9976.
- Keshokov, Alim (1972). "As Vital as Water". Soviet Literature. Foreign Languages Publishing House (1–6): 100–106.
- Kothari, Kalyan Singh (1968). "A Desert Village Blooms – Borunda Works "Wonder Wells"". Yojana. Publications Division, Ministry of Information and Broadcasting. 11 (26).
