= Sopra, Bhopalgarh =

Sopra Sopda
- village
- Location in Rajasthan, India Sopra (India)
- Coordinates: 26°39′17″N 73°29′45″E
- Country: India
- State: Rajasthan
- District: Jodhpur
- Tehsil: Bhopalgarh
- Established: 1923
- Elevation: 300 m (980 ft)

Population (2011)
  - Total: 1,264

Languages
  - Official: Hindi
- Time zone: UTC+5:30 (IST)
- ISO 3166 code: RJ-IN
- Vehicle registration: RJ-19

Sopara or Sopra or Hopra is a village located in the Bhopalgarh tehsil of Jodhpur District, Rajasthan, India.

== History ==
The habitation is around 500 years old. It is said that the village was established by the two brothers and their nephew who travelled to the place long back ago from Kurchi (another village). All the people of the village are the progeny of the three gentlemen. As a result, the village is divided in three major "baas" (habitations), namely "Uperly Baas", "Bhichily Baas" and "Khurali Baas".

== The name "Sopra" ==
It is said that the three men reached the place at time of dusk, so they called the place होपड़ा, Hopda or Hopra, meaning "dusk is approached" in the local language, Marwari. Later it corrupted to Sopda and Sopra.

== Demographics ==
Sopra has population of 1264 of which 658 are males while 606 are females as per Population Census 2011. In Sopra village population of children with age 0–6 is 140.

659 of the population are literate.

Languages: People predominantly speak Marwari language and has a good understanding of Hindi too.

== Social structure ==
There are around 250 households in the village. Majority of them belong to Godara Jats which is a landowning peasant class. Thus colloquially village is also called as 'Godara nagar Hopra' by people from the community.

There are many households of 'Meghwals' and 'Bhils' too, which form an important part of the village community.

Apart from that to meet the requirements of land based caste society, there is one household each of Suthar (carpenter class), Lohar (Blacksmith class), Barber, Rajput etc.

=== Migration ===
Lately many people of 'Mali' community, another peasant class have come and settled in the village fields.

While many people of have migrated to villages of Salwa and Kheri nearby. In most recent times, most of the migrant are leaving for the city of Jodhpur.

== Beliefs ==
Almost all residents are Hindus and worship the local deity Bhomiaji, who is a medieval hero who laid his life protecting the cows from thieves. There is a Chattri dedicated to him on the local mound in the village. It is adjoined by another Chattri of his devotee Jyothsinghji who was also a resident of the village.

Several other temples are also there in the village dedicated to Thakurji (Krishna), Shiva, Ramdevji. There are chabutaras for Gogaji, Pabuji scattered across.

People highly regard Jogmaya of Bhagoria village temple and attend annual navratri fair without a miss.

=== Bhomiaji Maharaj Temple ===
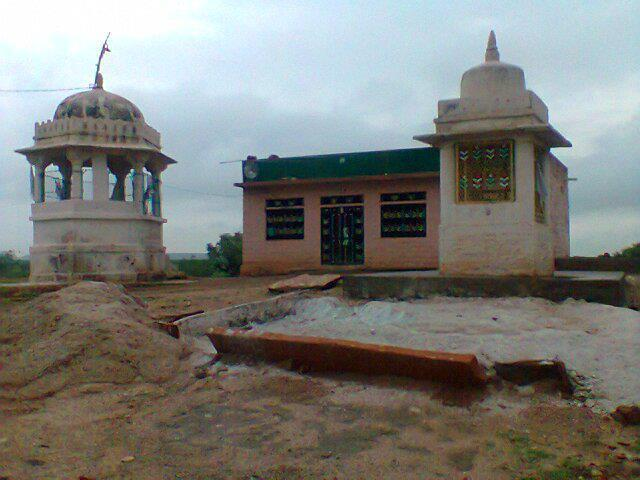

It is located on a small hill nearby a pond in village.

- The tip of chattri is the highest point for any built structure in the village. And it will possibly remain so for a long time due to a practice among villagers of not going above the height of chattri while building their houses.
  - Thus there are not many double story houses in the village, only one.

== Culture ==
- Deepawali is the major festival celebrated by the residents of village, almost all houses are decorated with lights and diyas during this 5 day long festival.
  - villagers pay visit to Bhomiaji chattri along with the 'jyots' and 'sweets'.
- Holi is another major Hindu festival celebrated, earlier it used to be a muted affair but over time new generation has adopted popular mainstream way of celebrating it like in major towns and cities i.e. roaming in bands to color people across village.
- Dashara is major cultural fest, with Ramlila ceremony annually for the entertainment of villagers.
- Bhomiaji Jagaran: is an annual affair coinciding with the birth anniversary of lord Bhomiaji on full moon day.
- Navratra: villagers attend an annual fair at Bhagoriya Jogamaya mataji temple in a nearby village.
- Runecha yatra: many people take to a religious journey to Ramdevra in Jaisalmer to pay homage to Ramdevji, some on foot and others by vehicles.

=== Marriage ===
Gotra system of marriage is followed by villagers, further strict endogamy and exogamy is followed by all the communities in the villages.

- Mounting of a horse is prohibited for the grooms in the village as horse is considered a mount of lord Bhomiaji.
- Mayara tradition: all villagers get together and contribute financially for the expenses borne out by daughter of village towards her son-daughter marriage.
- Aata-Saata (aamne-saamne) tradition
- 'Baand barai' : is a tradition of villagers and relatives contributing small sums of money to help the family meet a part of their marriage ceremony expenses.

Main marriage is usually a 2-3 day affair, it starts with Ghee ceremony, then subject is invited for meal at its relatives house and songs are sung (Bandolas) until the night of Bindoli or the music ceremony. The next day for a groom, he takes the 'Jaan' (baarat) to the brides place, for a bride, 'jaan' comes to the village.

The day is accompanied by Hathai' or meeting of elders and relatives of the couple at a huge meal at bride's place. Next day is marked by the meal and hathai at the grooms place.

=== Food ===
- Bajra roti and dry curries like kair, sangari, kachar, kutta and wet curries like kadi is the traditional food of the villagers.
- Dal Baati uses lentils (moong and moth) and wheat/Bajra.
- Rice used to be a special occasion meal only, but has come to occupy place in general cuisine over time.

==== Breads ====
Bajra Roti, Baati (bajra and wheat), muthadiya.

==== Curries ====
Dry: kair, sangari, kachar, kutta, panchkutta, kumatiya, tindsi, guarfali,

Wet: dal, kadi, haldi, sev-tamatar, raabri,

==== Desserts ====
Heera or Halwa- suji and wheat, sweet rice, Churma, kasaar,

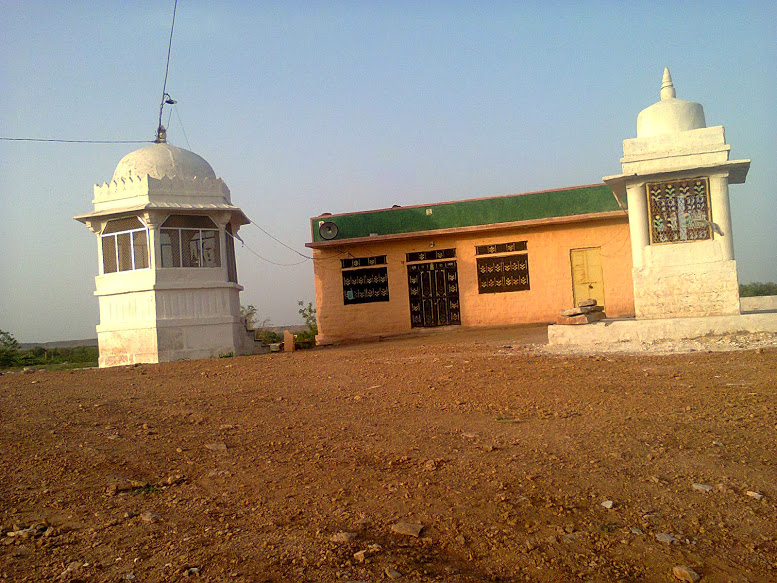
Temple of Worshipped god shri Bhomiaji maharaj.

== Governance ==
As per constitution of India and Panchyati Raaj Act, Sopra village is clubbed with villages of Tambariya Kallan, Tambariya Khurd and Heeradesar under the 'Heeradesear Gram Panchayat' and is administrated by Sarpanch (Head of Village) who is elected representative of village.

=== Government presence ===
- an upper primary school
- an anganwadi
- a primary health center in construction stage
- a fair price shop
- two GLRs (ground level reservoir) and a tubewell for drinking water requirements
- village get electricity from GSS at Tambariya village nearby

== Geography ==
Village is located in Bhopalgarh block on South-eastern side of Jodhpur district. It has an undulating topography with small ridges and rocks around. There is complete absence of sand dunes in and around the village.

Village is nested among very old hillocks on all sides.Along the North lies Bhagaramji Bhakar, in north east lies Chitorri Bhaker (Hill), along south-east lies Nathji Maharaj Ka Bhakar, while Minger Bhakar lies just south west.

There is a village pond named Hivli Naadi, the foothills of Minger Bhakar forms the catchment of the pond. One more large pond lies along the Bhopalgarh road named, Dhoodh Nada. One ephemeral drain originating from Nathji Maharaj Ka Bhakar flows in north of the village and ends in fields near Heeradesar road.

== Forest and Wildlife ==
Village has negligible forest area, dominant vegetation is xerophytic along with semi-arid species of Thar desert. Khejri is the major tree type, along with that, Ber, kair, desi babool, videshi babool, aakda, rohida, neem, anna, hingot etc are also found in less numbers.

Wildlife include Neelgai (Bluebull), Rabbits, peacocks, pheasants, crows, pigeons, sparrows, lapwigs (titodi) etc.

== Climate ==
Climate of village is hot arid as it lies at the edge of the Thar desert. It receives most of its rain in the four months of Monsoon (Chaumasa), June to September. Thus agriculture is mainly rain-fed. Village is infamous for continuous decade long droughts in the past.

It witness extremes of temperature in line with other parts of the district. Diurnal temperature difference are also huge. Humidity is low year around.

== Connectivity ==
Villages in well connected with nearby villages and tehsil of Bhopalgarh with black top metaled roads. Bhopalgarh is 9 km from the village center. Kuri is 6 km, from where state highway 63 passes. Village is around 55 km from the city of jodhpur and two regular bus services are there.

Gotan railway station at around 40 km is the nearest large railway station.

== Education ==
There are two schools in the village. One state government upper primary school and another primary school run by Bharti foundation. Most of the students for better education opportunities either attends schools in the nearby Tehsil, Bhopalgarh or migrate to city of Jodhpur.

== Economy ==
- Solar and Wind energy: Hopra Village gets abundant sunlight throughout year and also there are strong winds blowing yearlong. Solar potential has not been utilised but there are around 3 large wind turbines in the village boundary.
- RIICO has acquired land in north eastern part of village, and an industrial area is to be developed which has the possibility to generate new avenues of livelihood for residents.
- Stone mining is another important economic activity, two stone crushers producing gravel and sand are operating inside the village.

== Livelihood ==
=== Agriculture and allied sector ===
Most of the villagers are engaged in dryland rain-fed agriculture. Of late many have been able to install tubewells thus improving irrigation and take more than one crop in an year. Dominant form of agriculture practised in mixed cropping.

Main crops grown include Bajra (pearl millet) in rotation with Moong or Til in rain-fed fields, While in irrigated khets, taramira, sarson, rizka, vegetables, cotton, chillies, jeera etc are grown.

Livestock rearing is another major occupation for many of the village families, cows and buffaloes are reared for milk, which is consumed locally as well as sold to hawkers from city. Milk products like Ghee is a major produce for many. While goats and sheep are reared for milk and wool. Camels are no longer reared in the village.

The illegal occupation of village commons has led to loss of grazing ground of most of the livestock and thus the activity is slowly on its decline.

=== Secondary sector ===
Many people are also involved in mining of building stones and slabs found along the foothills of Chittori bhakar, Minger bhakar and in nearby Kudi village. Precious Jasper stone is also found in the village. Mining along with livestock rearing used to be main occupation of residents in non rainy season in pre-MGNREGA (cash for work scheme of state) times.

=== Services ===
Government job in armed forces, teaching and state police is also an important source of livelihood for many.

== Notable persons ==
- Kanwararam Godara: Son of the soil Kanwararamji attained veergati in 1998 Kargil war. A life size image has been installed nearby the village pond in memory of his great sacrifice towards the service of nation.
- Jyotsinghji: A devotee of Bhomiaji maharaj, a Chattri in his honour has been erected nearby Bhomiaji Chattri.
