= Punit Van =

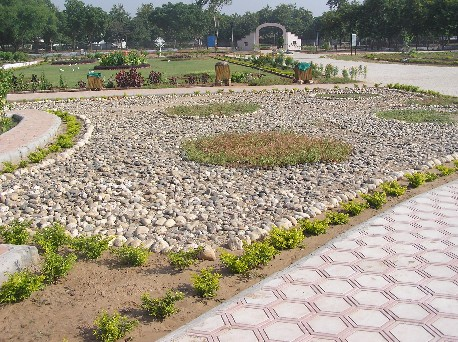
- Map
- Type: Botanical
- Location: Gandhinagar, Gujarat
- Coordinates: 23°13′01″N 72°40′04″E
- Opened: 2005
- Owner: Government of Gujarat

Punit Van is a botanical garden located in Sector 19 in Gandhinagar, the capital of Gujarat in India. It was developed in 2005 by the forest department of the Government of Gujarat. The forest department has developed several acres of land where the planted trees have been associated with stars, planets and zodiac signs. Punit means holy and Van means forest in Gujarati. Thus the garden has been called a holy forest. When it was founded, almost 3500 trees were planted in it, all with an astrological significance according to Hindu mythology.

== Design ==
The garden which is highlighted as a prime tourist attraction of the city is divided into five large components: Nakshatra Van, Rashi Van, Nav Grah Van and Panchvati Van.

== See also ==
- Arid Forest Research Institute (AFRI)
