= Bilara tehsil =

Tehsil in Jodhpur, Rajasthan

Bilara Tehsil
- Tehsil
- Interactive map of Bilara Tehsil
- Coordinates: 26°13′N 073°40′E
- Country: India
- District: Jodhpur
- Time zone: UTC+5:30 (IST)
- ISO 3166 code: RJ-IN
- Lok Sabha constituency: Pali
- Vidhan Sabha constituency: Bilara SC

Bilara Tehsil is a tehsil in Jodhpur District of Rajasthan state in western India. The tehsil headquarters are in the town of Bilara.

== Geography ==
Bilara tehsil is the southeasternmost of the eleven tehsils in Jodhpur District. It borders Bhopalgarh tehsil to the north, Nagaur District to the northeast, Pali District to the east and south, and Luni tehsil and Mandor tehsil to the west.

== History ==
Bilara tehsil was part of the SOHU princely state of Marwar.

== Economy ==
The economy of the tehsil is mainly based on agriculture and related businesses.

== Demographics ==
In the 2001 census, the Bilara tehsil had 251,946 inhabitants, with 130,451 males (51.8%) and 121,495 females (48.2%), for a gender ratio of 931 females per thousand males. In 2001, the tehsil was 71.7% rural.

== Points of interest ==
The Marwari people inhabit most of Bilara tehsil, and one can see typical Marwari customs and culture in the town of Bilara, and in villages throughout the tehsil.

== Villages ==
There are forty panchayat villages in Bilara tehsil:

- Bala
- Barna
- Bhawi
- Binjwadia
- Borunda
- Boyal
- Buchkalla
- Chandelao
- Chirdhani
- Choda
- Ghana Magra or Ghana Mangra
- Hariyada
- Hariyadhana
- Jetiwas
- Jhak
- Kalauna
- Kaparda
- Khariya Mithapur
- Khejarla
- Lamba
- Madaliya
- Malawas
- Malkosani
- Nanan
- Olvi
- Patel Nagar
- Pichiyak
- Ramasani
- Ramdawas
- Ransi gaon
- Rawniyana
- Rawar
- Rinya
- Sambariya
- Silari
- Sindhipuri
- Tilwasni
- Udaliyawas
