= Central Arid Zone Research Institute =

ICAR-CAZRI, a research institute in Jodhpur, India

- केन्द्रीय शुष्क क्षेत्र अनुसन्धान संस्थान (काजरी)
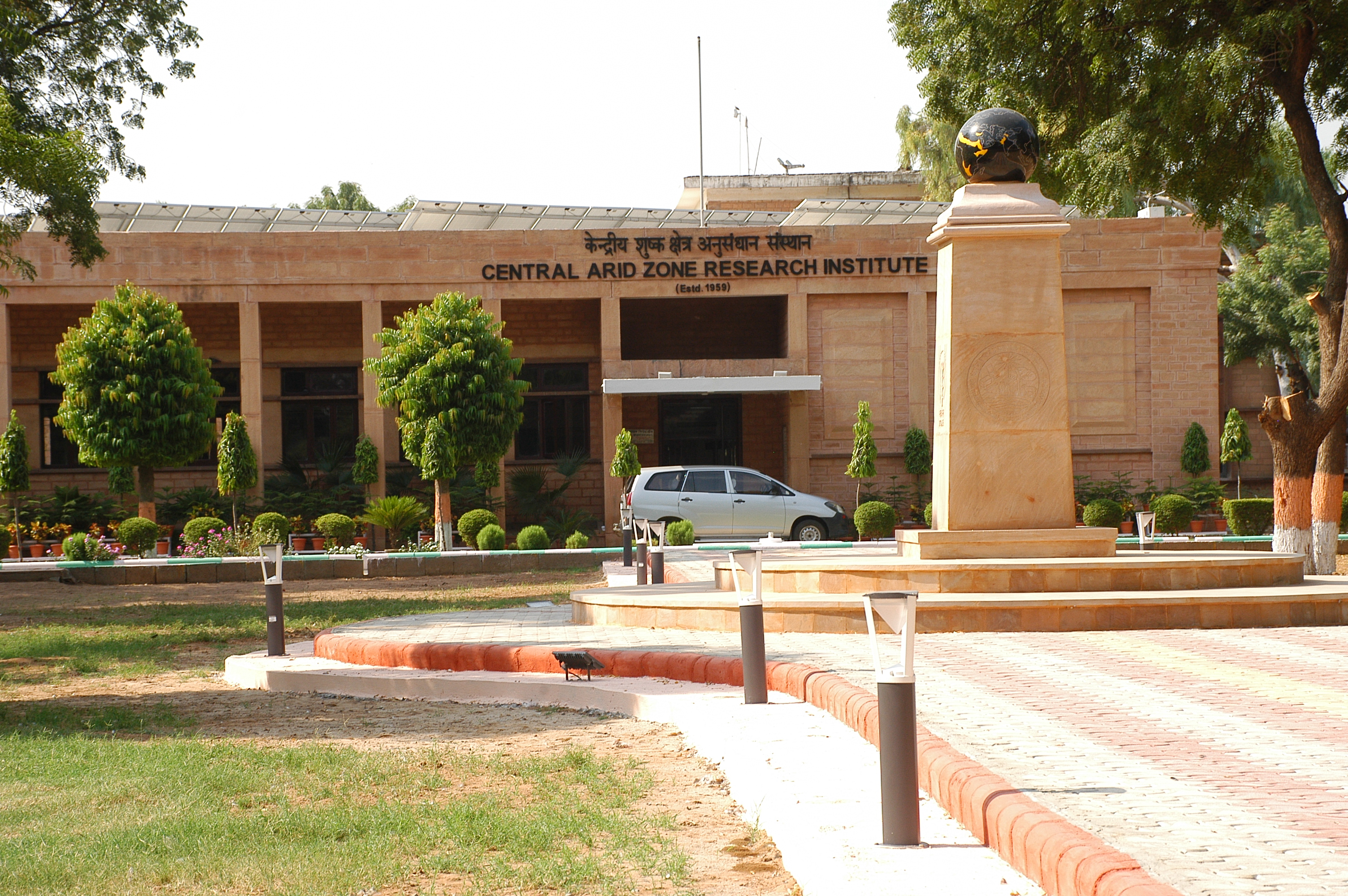
- ICAR-Central Arid Zone Research Institute, Jodhpur
- Other name: CAZRI
- Motto: Enhancing resilience of arid lands
- Established: 1959
- Parent institution: Indian Council of Agricultural Research, Department of Agricultural Research and Education, Ministry of Agriculture and Farmers Welfare, Government of India.
- Director: Dr. O.P. Yadav
- Location: Jodhpur, Rajasthan, 342003, India; 26.2430°N 73.0083°E
- Website: www.cazri.res.in

The Central Arid Zone Research Institute (CAZRI) is a research institute of the Indian Council of Agricultural Research (ICAR) located at Jodhpur, Rajasthan. It is an autonomous organisation under the Department of Agriculture Research and Education (DARE) of the Ministry of Agriculture and Farmers Welfare of Government of India. CAZRI is exclusively devoted to arid zone research and development.

The institute started in 1952 as Desert Afforestation Research Station at Jodhpur to carry out research on sand dune stabilization and for establishment of shelter belt plantations to arrest wind erosion.

It was reorganized as Desert Afforestation and Soil Conservation Station in 1957 and finally in its present form Central Arid Zone Research Institute in 1959 on recommendation of the UNESCO (United Nations Educational, Scientific and Cultural Organization) expert, Prof. CS Christian of the Commonwealth Scientific and Industrial Research Organisation (CSIRO), Australia. In 1966, the institute was brought under the administrative control of Indian Council of Agricultural Research (ICAR), New Delhi.

The institute conducts research in Rajasthan, Gujarat, Punjab, Haryana, Karnataka and Andhra Pradesh and 7 million ha area of cold arid zone in Jammu and Kashmir, and Himachal Pradesh.

The Institute received Sardar Patel Outstanding ICAR Institution Award in 2017.

The institute is carrying out research through six divisions:

- Division of Natural Resources
- Division of Integrated Farming Systems
- Division of Plant Improvement and Pest Management
- Division of Livestock Production and Range Management
- Division of Agricultural Engineering and Renewable Energy
- Division of Transfer of Technology and Training

CAZRI has five Regional Research Stations (RRSs),

== Regional Research Stations ==
- RRS Pali-Marwar (Rajasthan)
- RRS Jaisalmer (Rajasthan)
- RRS Bikaner (Rajasthan)
- RRS Kukma-Bhuj (Gujarat)
- RRS Leh (Ladakh)

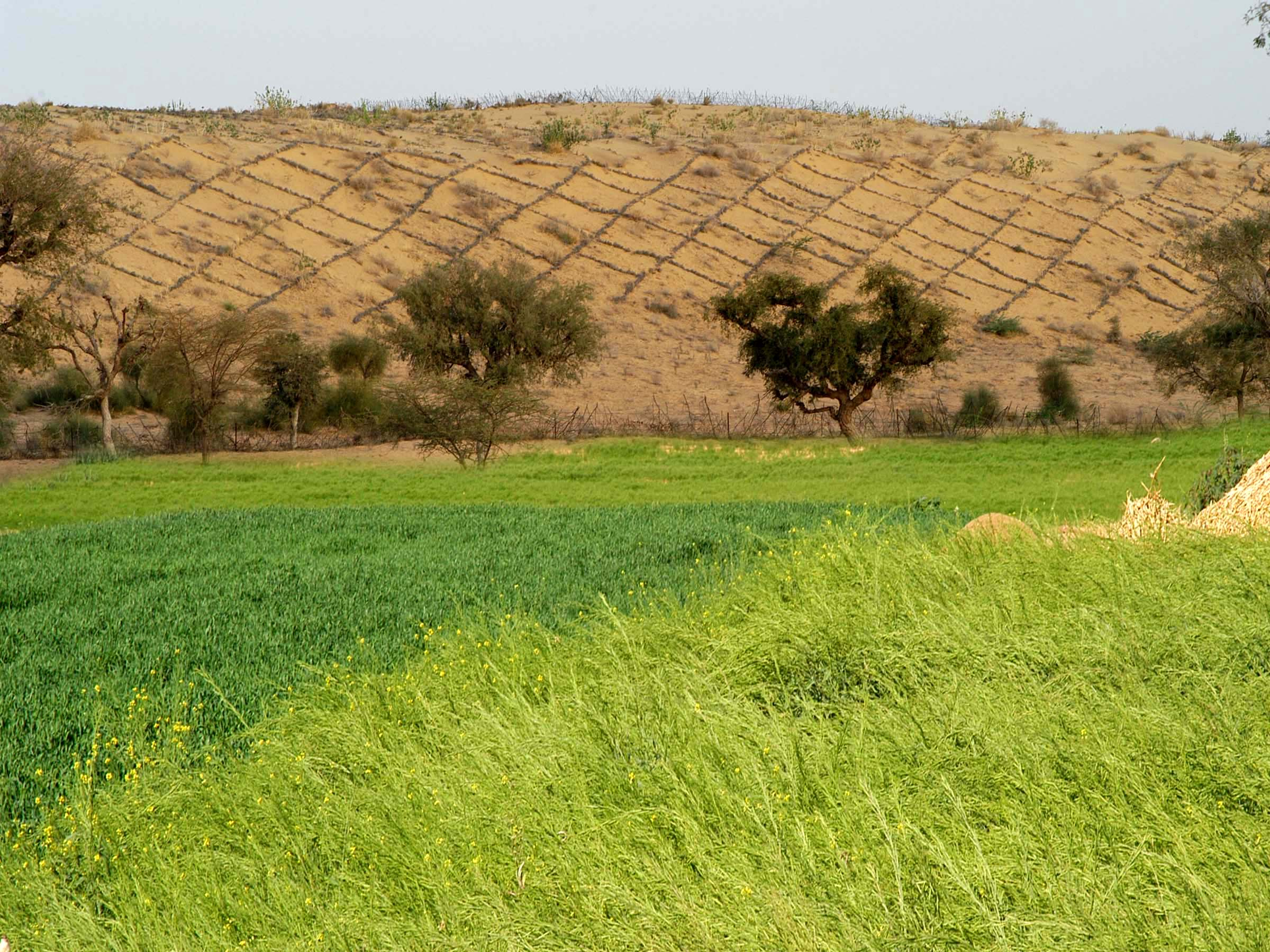
Sand dune stabilization

Several need-based, cost effective technologies like sand dune stabilization, wind erosion control, water management, grassland improvement, watershed development, rehabilitation of wastelands, arid land farming systems, arid horticulture, alternate land use strategies, pest management, solar devices, etc. have been developed and transferred to farmers and other stakeholders.

This institute has a full-fledged section on renewable energy and has developed many solar energy based gadgets/devices, like animal feed cooker, dryers, water heaters, candle making device, cool chambers, etc., which are finding place in rural households. Agro-voltaic system of 105 kW capacity has been developed at Jodhpur integrating crop production, PV-based electricity generation and rainwater harvesting. The institute has evolved technologies and strategies for combating drought and desertification.

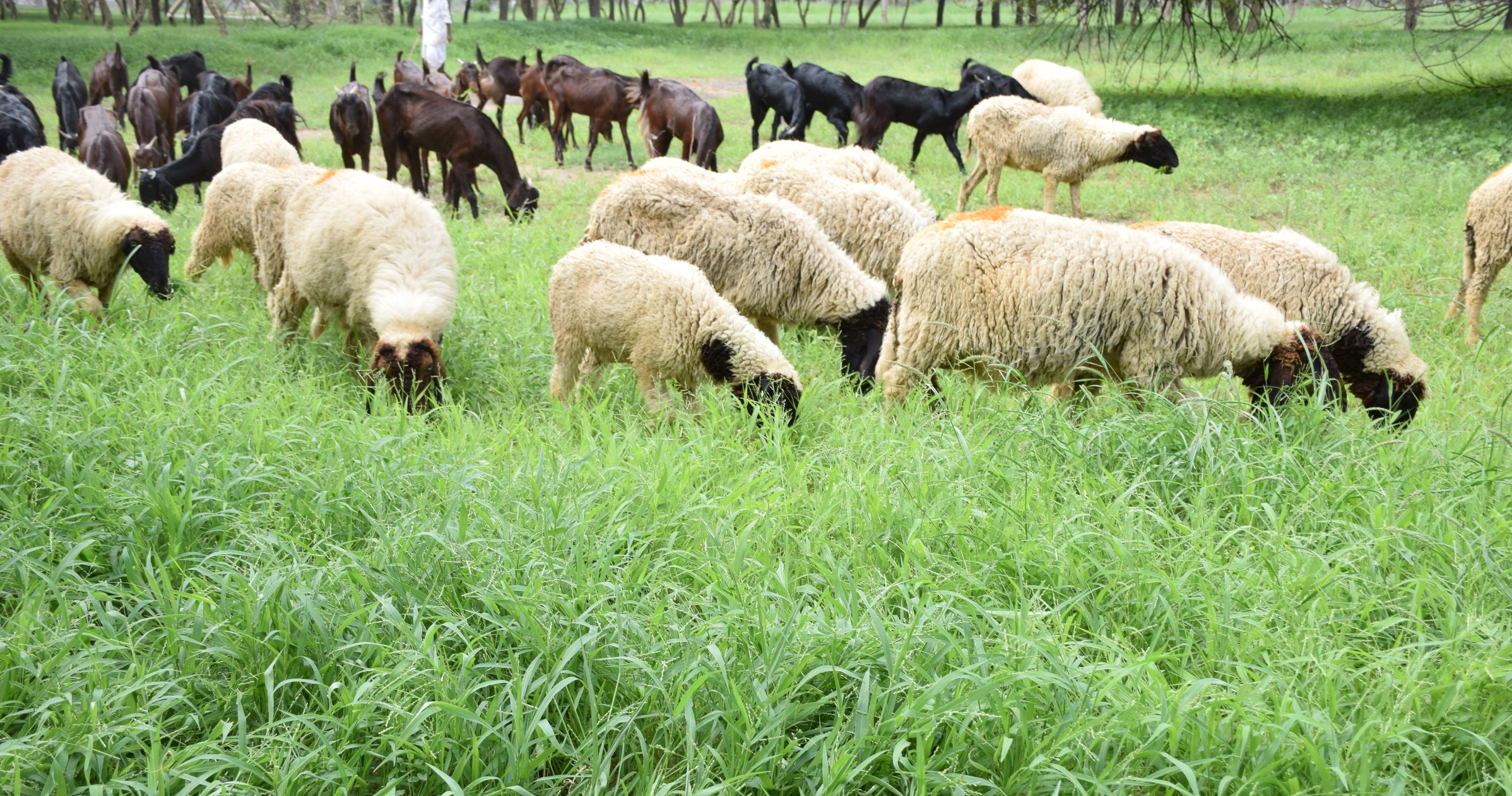
Sheep & Goat grazing trials

It has developed close liaison with several national and international organizations and has made major strides in providing advisories and consultancies to many agencies in India and abroad. Besides, CAZRI is a major destination for capacity building of scientists, policy planners and extension officials related to arid zone development.

Through its extension wing and Krishi Vigyan Kendras (located at Jodhpur, Pali and Kukma-Bhuj) the institute is in direct touch with farmers, state government officials, NGOs and other stakeholders and organises regular trainings and demonstrations.

== See also ==
- Indian Council of Agricultural Research
- Arid Forest Research Institute Jodhpur
- Central Sheep and Wool Research Institute Avikanagar
- Indian Council of Forestry Research and Education
- Van Vigyan Kendra (VVK) Forest Science Centres
