= Kur, Rajasthan =

Kur Koor, Kood, Kudd
- village
- Location in Rajasthan, India Kur (India)
- Coordinates: 26°20′07″N 73°22′09″E
- Country: India
- State: Rajasthan
- District: Jodhpur
- Tehsil: Bhopalgarh

Government
  - Body: Gram panchayat

Population (2001)
  - Total: 2,042
- Time zone: UTC+5:30 (IST)
- ISO 3166 code: RJ-IN
- Vehicle registration: RJ-19

Kur is a panchayat village in Rajasthan in western India. Administratively, it is under Bhopalgarh tehsil, Jodhpur District of the state of Rajasthan.

There are three villages in the Kood gram panchayat: Kur, Hinganiya (Hingania) and Khokhariya (Khokharia).

== Demographics ==
In the 2001 census, the village of Kur had 2,042 inhabitants, with 1,044 males (51.1%) and 998 females (48.9%), for a gender ratio of 956 females per thousand males.
