= Malar, Bhopalgarh =

Malar
- Village panchayat
- Interactive map of Malar
- Coordinates: 26°28′58.0″N 73°28′51.5″E
- Country: India
- State: Rajasthan
- District: Jodhpur district
- Taluk: Bhopalgarh tehsil

Government
  - Type: Village panchayat
  - Body: Malar Village panchayat

Population
  - Total: 1,912
- Demonym: Indian

Languages
  - Official: Rajasthani language
- Time zone: UTC+5:30 (IST)
- PIN: 342606

Malar village is located in Bhopalgarh Tehsil of Jodhpur district in Rajasthan, India. It is situated 30 km away from sub-district headquarter Bhopalgarh and 66 km away from district headquarter Jodhpur. As per 2009 stats, Malar village is also a gram panchayat. The total geographical area of village is 1217.47 hectares. Malar has a total population of 1,912 people. There are about 387 houses in Malar village. Pipar City is nearest town to Malar which is approximately 12 km away. According to Census 2011 information the location code or village code of Malar village is 084862.
