= Pipar =

Village in Gujarat, India

Coordinates: 23.522027°N 68.524543°E

Pipar is a village in Lakhpat Taluka of Kutch district of Gujarat, India.

== History ==
Pipar was ruled by a lineal descendant of Jam Manai, from the family of Rao of Cutch State until independence of India in 1947. There are four square ruinous domed tombs, one of them bearing date 1556. One of the tombs was destroyed in 1819 Rann of Kutch earthquake.
