= Detha =

Charan clan

Detha, or Detho, is a Charan clan (gotra) in Sindh province of Pakistan, and in Indian states of Rajasthan, and Gujarat. Another Muslim Detho clan in Pakistan is a sub-tribe of Abro tribe. Detho is title given to Jakhro tribe.

== History ==
Dethas were mainly centred in Sindh (Pakistan) in the areas of Tharparkar and Umerkot where Dethas were closely associated with the Sodha Rajputs. The largest jagir of Kharoda, located 3 miles north-east of Umerkot, was granted to Japhji Detha in 1225 AD (VS 1282) by the ruler of Umerkot, Rana Jaibhrama. Japhji Detha had aided the Rana in expansion of the kingdom.

== Post-independence ==
After independence and partition of India, many Hindu communities migrated to India but a substantial number remained in Pakistan. Due to clan exogamy, remaining Dethas of Sindh have to find matches with other Charan families in India for the marriage of their children.

== Kuldevi ==
Dethas worship Deval Mata as their Kuldevi (patron goddess) whose main temple is located in Kharoda village of Sindh, Pakistan.

== Notable people ==
- Vijaydan Detha (Indian writer of Rajasthani literature)

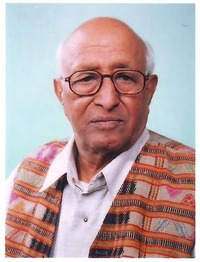

- Chandi Dan Detha
- Swami Swarupdas
