= Poondloo =

- Village
- Interactive map of Poondloo
- Location within Rajasthan
- Coordinates: 26°32′50″N 73°48′42″E
- Country: India
- State: Rajasthan
- District: Nagaur
- Tehsil: Merta

Area
  - Total: 41.47 km^{2} (16.01 sq mi)

Population (2011)
  - Total: 6,827
- Postal code: 341510

Poondloo is a village located in the Merta tehsil of Nagaur district in the state of Rajasthan, India. It is situated 35 km away from the sub-district headquarters Merta (tehsildar office) and 115 km away from the district headquarters Nagaur. As of the 2011 Census, Poondloo village has a population of 6,827 people, with 3,572 males and 3,255 females. The literacy rate in Poondloo is 44.90%, with 60.86% of males and 27.37% of females being literate. The village has approximately 1,284 houses. The pin code for the Poondloo village locality is 341510. Merta City is the nearest major town, approximately 35 km away, for all major economic activities.

== Connectivity ==
- Public Bus Service: Available within the village
- Private Bus Service: Available within the village
- Railway Station: Available within 10+ km distance

== Geographical Information ==
- Area: 41.47 hectares
- Nearest Town: Merta City (35 km)

== Neighbourhoods of Poondloo ==
1. Maliyo Ki Dhani
2. Shekhasani
3. Dhadhasani
4. Gathiya
5. Gagrana
6. Beetan
7. Kurdaya
8. Peethas
9. Ramliyas
10. Looniyas
11. Bayad

== Related Pages ==
- List of Villages in Merta
- List of Tehsils in Nagaur
- List of districts of Rajasthan
