= Ratkuria =

- village
- Location in Rajasthan, India Ratkuria (India)
- Coordinates: 26°32′54″N 73°33′46″E
- Country: India
- State: Rajasthan
- Founder: Rataji Dudi

Government
  - Type: Indian Government

Languages
  - Official: Hindi
- Time zone: UTC+5:30 (IST)
- ISO 3166 code: RJ-IN
- Vehicle registration: RJ-
- Website: http://www.ratkuria.byethost11.com/

Ratkuria is a village in Bhopalgarh tehsil, Jodhpur district, Rajasthan, India located at 26°32′54″N 73°33′46″E. Its PIN code is 342606. It is the location of a Ch. Gullaram Government Senior Secondary School.
