= Jojari River =

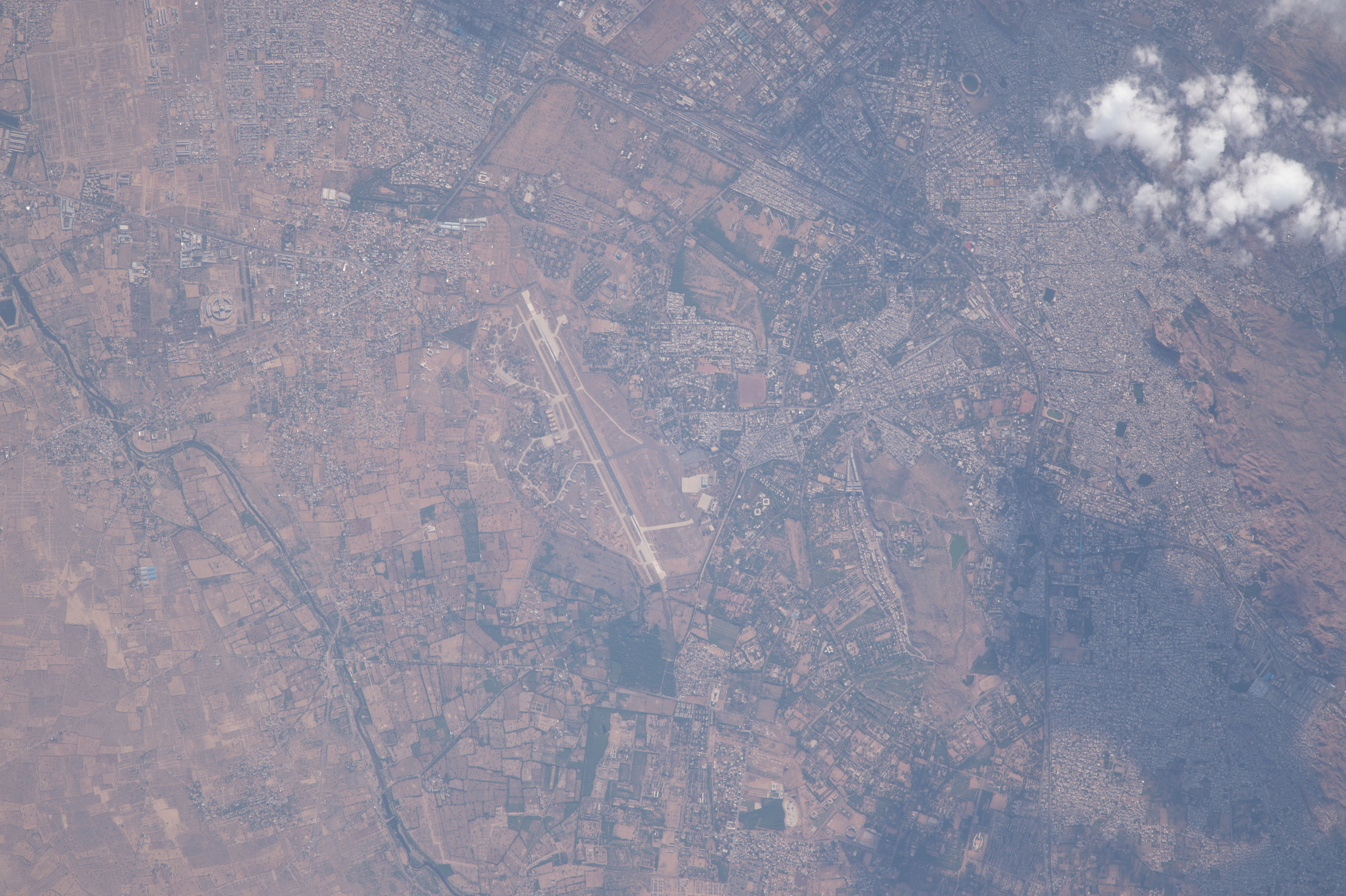
- View of Jodhpur, Airport, Jojari River, AGR., Roads, Urban Areas taken during ISS Expedition 43.
- Interactive Map

Location
- Country: India
- State: Rajasthan
- District: JodhpurG

Physical characteristics
- Source: Hills near Poondloo village, Nagaur district
  - coordinates: 26.540759°N 73.808330°E
- Mouth: Converges with Luni River near Khejadla Khurd, Jodhpur district
- Length: 83 kilometres (52 mi)
- Basin size: 3,600 square kilometres (1,400 sq mi)
- Depth
  - average: 5 metres (16 ft)
  - maximum: 10 metres (33 ft)

The Jojari River is a 83 km (52 mi) seasonal watercourse in Rajasthan, India. It primarily carries surplus rainwater from the hills near Poondloo village in Nagaur district. Flowing in a north-east to south-west direction, it gathers water from multiple smaller streams along its path, ultimately converging with the Luni River near Khejalda Khurd in Jodhpur district. This river is a tributary of Luni river.

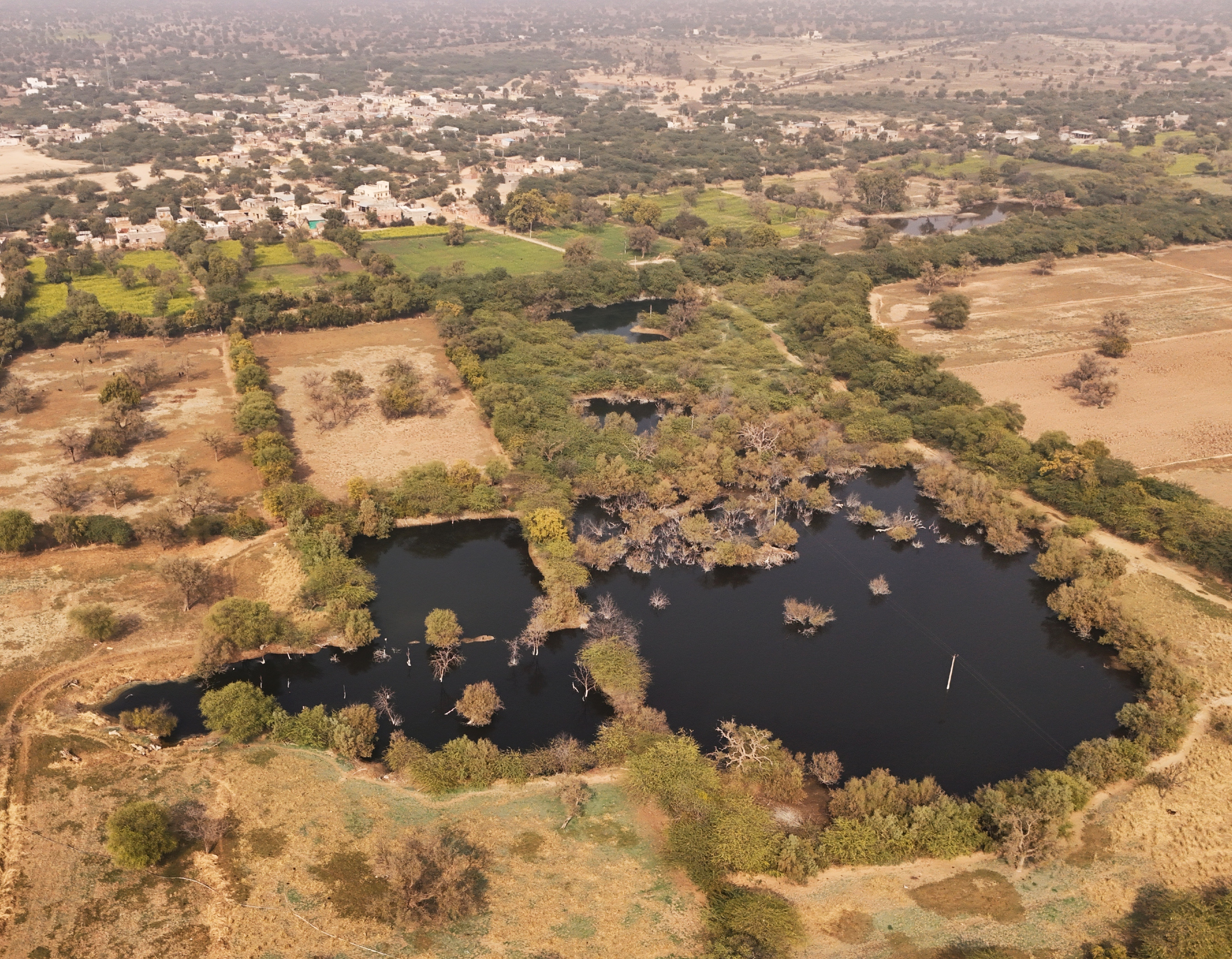
Area affected by the polluted Jojri river in Rajasthan

This river has become heavily polluted due to inflow of industrial and domestic waste with toxic chemicals, including sulfur, lead, and cadmium, primarily from untreated effluents discharged by Boranada's textile and chemical industries. Additional pollution from untreated sewage has further degraded water quality, rendering the river toxic, destroying ecosystems, and impacting the health and livelihoods of approximately 1.6 million people living along its banks.

== Pollution and government actions ==
The river is severely polluted by untreated industrial waste from over 700 Boranada factories, releasing sulfur, lead, cadmium, and other chemicals. Untreated sewage from villages like Doli and Dhava adds to the contamination. The river's toxic water has destroyed ecosystems, killed wildlife, and rendered 100-150 km of farmland barren, with a 2024 study detecting heavy metals like lead, and cadmium in food grains. Health issues, including respiratory and skin ailments, plague locals, and groundwater contamination threatens 1.6 million people. Villages like Melba face exodus due to unlivable conditions.

The Rajasthan government allocated ₹176 crore in 2025-26, following ₹400 crore in 2023 and ₹172.58 crore in 2024, but weak enforcement, misdirected funds, and political disputes have stalled progress. Despite NGT orders and 73 factory closures since 2019, illegal dumping persists. Geocycle's 2024 cleanup plan lacks clear impact. As of 2025, the river remains toxic, requiring stricter regulations, upgraded treatment plants, and transparent fund use to restore it.

== Protest against pollution crisis ==
The villagers and social activists are protesting against the pollution crisis for many years.

Shravan Patel, a wildlife photographer from Melba village in Jodhpur district, became involved in conservation efforts related to the Jojri after observing experimental khailis (low-lying ponds) at the Tal Chhapar Wildlife Sanctuary in 2022. According to Down to Earth, Patel adapted this model in his home villages of Melba and Dhawa, where he and his team constructed more than a dozen ponds in local orans (community forests). These structures were designed to reduce wildlife dependence on the polluted Jojri, which has been affected by untreated effluents from textile units. Patel reported that in 2024, eight deer died from consuming contaminated river water, but after the implementation of the khaili project, no further deaths were recorded, and the local chinkara population increased from 38 to 46.

As per The Better India, Patel created a WhatsApp group titled "Ek Rupiya Pratidin, Vanayjeevon ke Naam" ("One Rupee per Day for Wildlife"), which gathered over 1,000 contributors providing small daily donations for pond construction and maintenance. Down to Earth noted that a video of the project shared on Instagram went viral, receiving more than 50 million views and inspiring similar efforts in over 30 villages across districts including Jodhpur, Barmer, Jaisalmer, Bikaner, Nagaur, Pali and Balotra.

In an interview with The Indian Express, Patel stated that the Jojri river is an important water source for blackbuck, chinkara, foxes, jackals, wolves and porcupines, but that several cases of animal deaths have occurred due to water pollution. He also remarked that although a riverfront project with a treatment plant had been inaugurated before the 2024 Lok Sabha elections by Jodhpur MP Gajendra Singh Shekhawat, no treatment facility has been implemented so far.

== Legal proceedings ==
On 16 September 2025, the Supreme Court of India under the bench of Justices Vikram Nath and Sandeep Mehta took suo motu cognizance of industrial waste discharge into Jojari river, citing environmental degradation and risks to local communities. The bench ordered to place the matter before the Chief Justice of India.
