= Bilara Assembly constituency =

Constituency of the Rajasthan legislative assembly in India

Coordinates: 26.17°N 73.70°E

Bilara
- Constituency No. 131 for the Rajasthan Legislative Assembly

Constituency details
- Country: India
- Region: North India
- State: Rajasthan
- District: Jodhpur district
- Established: 1951
- Reservation: SC

Member of Legislative Assembly
- 16th Rajasthan Legislative Assembly
- Incumbent Arjun Lal Garg
- Party: Bharatiya Janta Party

Bilara Assembly constituency is one of constituencies of Rajasthan Legislative Assembly in the Pali Lok Sabha constituency.

== Members of the Legislative Assembly ==
Year	Name	Party	
1.	1952	Santosh Singh	Independent
2.	1957	Bhairon Singh	Indian National Congress
3.	1962	Chander Singh	Independent
4.	1967(SC)	Kaluram Arya	Indian National Congress
5.	1972(SC)	Kaluram Arya	Indian National Congress
6.	1977	Ramnarain Dudi	Indian National Congress
6.	1980	Ramnarain Dudi	Indian National Congress
7.	1985	Rajendra Choudhary	Indian National Congress
8.	1990	Mishrilal Choudhary	Janata Dal
9.	1993	Rajendra Choudhary	Indian National Congress
10.	1998	Rajendra Choudhary	Indian National Congress
11.	2003	Ramnarain Dudi	Bharatiya Janata Party
12.	2008	Arjun Lal	Bharatiya Janata Party
13.	2013	Arjun Lal	Bharatiya Janata Party
14	2018	Heera Ram	Indian National Congress
15	2023	Arjun Lal Garg	Bharatiya Janata Party

== Election results ==
=== 2023 ===
2023 Rajasthan Legislative Assembly election: Bilara
Party	Candidate	Votes	%	±%
BJP	Arjun Lal Garg	90,766	46.25	+10.57
INC	Mohanlal Katariya	80,342	40.94	+0.06
RLP	Jagdish Kadela	20,478	10.43	−9.99
NOTA	None of the above	1,844	0.94	−0.35
Majority		10,424	5.31	+0.11
Turnout		196,248	67.58	−2.14
INC gain from		Swing		

=== 2018 ===
2018 Rajasthan Legislative Assembly election: Bilara
Party	Candidate	Votes	%	±%
INC	Heera Ram	75,671	40.88	
BJP	Arjun Lal	66,053	35.68	
RLP	Vijendra Jhala	37,796	20.42	
Abhinav Rajasthan Party	Mangilal	1,952	1.05	
NOTA	None of the above	2,387	1.29	
Majority		9,618	5.2	
Turnout		185,124	69.72	
INC gain from		Swing		

== See also ==
- Member of the Legislative Assembly (India)
