= Borunda =

- Town
- Location in Rajasthan, India Borunda (India)
- Coordinates: 26°28′08.7″N 73°48′21.6″E
- Country: India
- State: Rajasthan
- District: Jodhpur

Government
  - Type: Village Panchayat

Population (2011)
  - Total: 15,480

Languages – Marwari
- Time zone: UTC+5:30 (IST)
- Postal code: 342604
- Vehicle registration: RJ-54

Borunda is a town in pipar city tahsil of Jodhpur district in Rajasthan. It is famous as the home of the Rupayan Sansthan and its founder Vijaydan Detha, well known writer and folklorist.

== Geography ==
Borunda is located at 26°28′4″N 73°48′18″E.

== Demographics ==
Census 2011:-

Particulars	Total	Male	Female
Total No. of Houses	2,773	–	–
Population	15,480	8,043	7,437
Child (0–6)	2,390	1,293	1,097
Schedule Caste	3,178	1,653	1,525
Schedule Tribe	50	25	25
Literacy	61.47%	76.30%	45.69%
Total Workers	6,250	4,068	2,182
Main Worker	4,999	–	–
Marginal Worker	1,251	494	757

== History ==
Various communities lived in Borunda village, including the locally dominant Rajput and Charan. In the pre-independence period, the inter-rivalry and feuds between Rajputs and Charans had led to several murders and displacement.

Post-independence, the village pulled together under the long time leadership of Chandidan Detha, the long-time Sarpanch of Borunda.

== Agricultural advances in Borunda ==
Starting in 1948, an innovating group of farmers centering on the Detha family begun using a large diesel- operated tubewell going down 100–150 feet. In Borunda, the first tractor was purchased in 1954 and by 1960, the number rose to 17. It was noted that the village progressed in field of agriculture despite no government cooperative inducement being applied till 1970. By 1970, one third of the village was irrigated and reaping the fruits of exploiting the resulting opportunities to grow HYV seeds. The Charans of Borunda became well known in the field of agriculture.

In 1970s, whereas in other regions of Jodhpur, scattered plots were being irrigated through Persian wheels or tanks constructed long ago by local rulers in Raj era, in Borunda the entire village floated on water due to adoption of tubewells.

Additionally, Borunda had sweet ground water available in lime stone formation and filled valleys. The extensive use of this ground water changed the landuse pattern of the village, particularly during the green revolution phase. It also pushed up the economy of the village as a whole.

However, by 1980, large tubewells of the 1960s were abandoned and now each of the 100 plus farmers had his own tubewell, but the total amount of irrigated acreage had decreased. Moreover, power cuts became regular and forced farmers who had run their tubewells for 16–24 hours a day to 8–12 hours a day, thus decreasing productivity.

== Rupayan Sansthan ==
In 1961, the resulting prosperity of Borunda led to the foundation of Rupayan Sansthan by Vijaydan Detha and Komal Kothari. This village-based institution is known for conserving and studying Rajasthani folk culture. The institution supported the publication of folk tales, and a journal.

== Notable people ==
- Chandi Dan Detha
- Komal Kothari
- Vijaydan Detha
