= List of airports in Rajasthan =

Rajasthan is one of the largest states of India followed by Madhya Pradesh, Maharashtra and Uttar Pradesh. It is located at the northwestern side of India and also known as Great Indian Desert. At present, there are 7 airports in Rajasthan. These airports are located in Jaipur, Udaipur, Jaisalmer, Jodhpur, Kishangarh, Bikaner and Kota. However, Kota is not operating any commercial flights, whereas other airports are running operational flights throughout the country.There is only 1 international airport and others are civil and domestic airports. Kishangarh (Ajmer) is the newest airport of Rajasthan

List

Sr No.	Name	Location	IATA code	Distance	Facilities
1.)	Bikaner Domestic Airport	At Nal Airport, Rajasthan	BKB	13 Km from city	Basic facilities including trolleys and information center
2.)	Jaipur International Airport	In Sanganer jaipur	JAI	5 Km from city	Trolleys, Mobile Charging and VIP rooms
3.)	Jaisalmer Domestic Airport	Airforce School Road, Jailsalmer	JSA	17 Km from city	Basic airport facilities including ATM, Passenger information center and Trolleys
4.)	Jodhpur Airport	Ratanada, Jodhpur	JDH	6 Km from city	Trolleys, information center and Wheelchair
5.)	Kishangarh Airport	Kishangarh, Rajasthan	KQH	15 Km from city	Screening machine, information centre
6.)	Kota Airport	Jhalawar Road, Gumanpura	KTU	6 Km from city	Not Operating
7.)	Maharanapartap Airport	Dabok, Rajasthan	UDR	22 Km from city	Basic airport facilities including ATM, trolleys etc.
