= Bhopalgarh =

Bhopalgarh Barlu
- City
- Location in Rajasthan, India Bhopalgarh (India)
- Coordinates: 26°39′17″N 73°29′45″E
- Country: India
- State: Rajasthan
- District: Jodhpur
- Tehsil: Bhopalgarh
- Founder: Bhopal Singh

Government
  - Body: Nagar Palika
- Elevation: 300 m (980 ft)

Population (2001)
  - Total: 19,078

Marwari
  - Official: Marwari
- Time zone: UTC+5:30 (IST)
- PIN: 342603
- ISO 3166 code: RJ-IN
- Vehicle registration: RJ-19,RJ-54

Bhopalgarh is a town located in the Jodhpur District of Rajasthan state in western India. It is a City and headquarters of the Bhopalgarh tehsil. Bhopalgarh Fort is the centre of attraction in the town. It is located in the Thar Desert, 90 km by road northeast of the city of Jodhpur, and 76 km by road west of Merta City in Nagaur District. Some of the villages which come under Bhopalgarh town are Nadsar, Kumbhara, Bagoriya, Kuri, Tambariya and Heradeshar ,Rudiya.

== Demographics ==
In the 2001 India census, the town of Bhopalgarh had a population of 19,078. Males constituted 9,907 (51.9%) of the population and females 9,171 (48.1%), for a gender ratio of 926 females per thousand males.

== Villages ==
Largest Village * Nadsar

- Bagoriya
