= Pipar City =

Pipar City Pipar
- City
- Location in Rajasthan, India Pipar City (India)
- Coordinates: 26.3880°N 73.5300°E
- Country: India
- State: Rajasthan
- District: Jodhpur
- Tehsil: Pipar City
- Elevation: 269 m (883 ft)

Population (2011)
  - Total: 36,816

Languages
  - Official: Hindi
- Time zone: UTC+5:30 (IST)
- PIN: 342601

Pipar City is a town and a municipality in Jodhpur district in the Indian state of Rajasthan. Jojari River, the tributary of Luni River, passes through this town.

== Legend ==
Pipar City, located in the Jodhpur district of Rajasthan, India, is traditionally believed to have been founded by a Paliwal Brahmin named Pipa. According to local legend, Pipa was a devout worshiper of a serpent deity, thought to be of the Takshaka or Naga lineage, whose sacred dwelling was situated by a tranquil lake on the town’s periphery.

Each day, Pipa offered milk to the serpent as a ritual of reverence. In return, the deity is said to have left two gold coins at the lake’s edge as a token of gratitude. When Pipa was called away to Nagaur, he entrusted the daily ritual to his young son. However, the boy, driven by greed, attempted to seize the serpent’s treasure. As the serpent emerged for its offering, the boy struck it with a stick, wounding but not killing the deity. The serpent withdrew in anger, and the boy, overcome with fear, confessed to his mother. Concerned for her son’s safety, she planned to send him away to his father the following day.

The next morning, tragedy struck. The boy was found dead, replaced in his bed by the coiled form of the massive serpent. Upon his return, Pipa was devastated by the loss of his son. Nonetheless, he continued his daily offerings at the lake, seeking forgiveness and atonement for the transgression.

Over time, Pipa’s unwavering devotion moved the serpent deity. The serpent eventually revealed its hidden treasury of gold and instructed Pipa to construct a monument to commemorate the events. It is from this act of devotion and reconciliation that the town of Pipar is believed to have originated.

The lake associated with the legend is known as Sampu, named in honor of the serpent. It continues to exist on the outskirts of Pipar, regarded as a symbol of divine mercy and spiritual faith.

== Demographics ==
As of 2011 Pipar City had a population of 36,810. Males constitute 52% of the population and females 48%. Piparcity has an average literacy rate of 52%, lower than the national average of 59.5%: male literacy is 66%, and female literacy is 36%. In Pipar city, 18% of the population is under 6 years of age.

== Education ==
Pipar City features government-run institutions for both school-level and higher education, working under the guidelines of the Department of Education, Government of Rajasthan.

=== School-level Education ===
The town hosts specialized institutes under the Directorate of Sanskrit Education, Government of Rajasthan:

- Rajkiya Varishtha Upadhayaya Sanskrit Vidyalaya, Pipar City: Located in Ward No. 10 (Nayapura), it is a state-run, co-educational higher secondary institution (UDISE ID: 08151407201) offering a continuous curriculum from secondary up to senior secondary level. However, facilities are virtually non-existent; there are only three government teachers in the entire school. The school is affiliated with the Board of Secondary Education, Rajasthan (RBSE), Ajmer. Essentially, the institution has been reduced to a mere polling booth during elections.

=== Higher Education ===
The higher education framework in the town includes state-run institutions affiliated with Jai Narain Vyas University (JNVU), Jodhpur:

- Government College, Pipar City:

Established during the academic session 2021–22 to fulfill the long-standing demand for co-educational higher education in the region. The college initially commenced its operations temporarily from an old government school building before transitioning into its newly constructed campus on Jawasiya Road.

- Smt. Sita Devi Chunni Lal Bardia Government Girls College: Established in July 1997 with an initial enrollment of 37 students, this premier institute is dedicated exclusively to women's higher education in western Rajasthan. Recognized under sections 2(f) and 12(B) of the UGC Act since 2006, it offers undergraduate courses in the Faculty of Arts (including subjects like Hindi Literature, Sanskrit, Political Science, Home Science, and History) and the Faculty of Commerce.
- Government Industrial Training Institute (ITI), Pipar City: A state-administered technical school dedicated to vocational training and providing engineering/non-engineering diplomas under the Directorate of Technical Education, Rajasthan.

== Tourist attractions ==
=== Historic Forts and Heritage ===
- Pipar Fort (The Kot): Dating back to the medieval period, this historic fort served as the palatial residence of the past Rathore rulers of the region. Today, the vibrant, ancient market of Pipar City—renowned for its ethnic garments, jewelry, and local crafts—is spread directly in front of this monumental structure. The fort is central to the town's historical identity and cultural gatherings.
- Fort Khejarla: Located in the nearby Khejarla Village, this stunning 400-year-old monument is constructed from granite and red sandstone, showcasing a classic blend of Rajput-Mughal architecture, intricate Jharokhas (hanging balconies), and latticework friezes. Originally built in 1611 A.D. by Maharaja Gopal Das Ji to honour his valour in battles against the Mughals, the fort has been meticulously restored and is currently operated as a luxury heritage hotel.

=== Temples and Religious Sites ===
- Shri Dadosa Baoji Temples: A deep-rooted local historical legend commemorates the bravery of Shri Ram Singh Ji Rathore (reverently known as "Shri Dadosa Baoji"), a past ruler who sacrificed his life defending the region. According to folk history, after being decapitated in battle near the fort, his head fell by the "Kot" while his torso continued to fight enemy forces for nearly a kilometer before falling near a pond. This act of supreme valor is enshrined in two distinct temples:
1. Shri Mahaldhani Dadosa Baoji Temple, situated inside the ancestral "Kot" where his head fell.
2. A smaller memorial temple built near the Sapasar Talav (pond) where his body fell.
- Shri Piparleshwar Mahadev Temple: An ancient Hindu temple dedicated to Lord Shiva, attracting devotees from across the Marwar region. The temple holds great spiritual significance, with its origins tied to local Puranic beliefs and regional ascetic traditions.
- Piplad Mata Temple: Located within Pipar City, this highly artistic temple dates back to the Pratihara period (Gurjara-Pratihara architecture). The structure bears architectural similarities to the famous ancient temples of Osian. An idol of Shadanan Kartikeya is enshrined in a niche behind the main sanctum, indicating the deep historical antiquity of the site.

=== Lakes and Cultural Experience ===
- Pipar Lake and Bazaars: Pipar Lake provides scenic views and recreational boating facilities for visitors. Beyond the lake, the town is globally recognized as a prominent nerve center for Rajasthan's traditional natural-dye fabric industry, famous for its indigo block-printing processes and bustling ethnic craft markets.
- Gangaur Mela: Celebrated annually on Ram Navami, the town hosts a unique 75-year-old Gangaur Mela tradition. The festival transforms the streets near the historic "Kot" into a living cultural theater featuring rhythmic martial art displays (Akhada) and celebrations of female bravery.
