= Bilara =

Bilara Bilara, Bilada
- City
- Nickname: Balipur
- Location in Rajasthan, India Bilara (India)
- Coordinates: 26.1792°N 73.7056°E
- Country: India
- State: Rajasthan
- District: Jodhpur
- Tehsil: Bilara
- Elevation: 269 m (883 ft)

Population (2011)
  - Total: 71,396

Languages
  - Official: Hindi
- Time zone: UTC+5:30 (IST)
- PIN: 342602
- Website: bilaracity.com

Bilara is a city and a municipality located in the Jodhpur district of Rajasthan, India. It is the administrative headquarters for Bilara tehsil and a market center for the surrounding agricultural area.

== Demographics ==
Bilara is a Municipality city in district of Jodhpur, Rajasthan. The Bilara city is divided into 35 wards for which elections are held every 5 years. In the 2011 India census, Urban population of Bilara was 71,396. Males constituted 51.8% (36,974) of the population and females 48.2% (34,422), for a gender ratio of 931 females per thousand males.[1] Bilara had an average literacy rate of 57%, lower than the national average of 59.5%; with male literacy of 73% and female literacy of 40%. In 2001 in Bilara, 13.6% of the population was under 6 years of age.

== Infrastructure ==
Bilara lies on National Highway 25 between the cities of Jodhpur and Jaitaran, and is the terminus for a rail line from Pipar City. The National Highways Authority of India (NHAI) has issued Letter of Award (LOA) for development of a national highway section in the state of Rajasthan under phase IV of National Highways Development Projects (NHDP). The 111 km long Bar-Bilara-Jodhpur section connects western Rajasthan and border areas (Jodhpur-Jaisalmer-Barmer) to the eastern parts of Rajasthan, Ajmer and Jaipur. This is a major strategic route connecting Jodhpur as an important feeder route during war time. Four-laning of the section will permit smooth flow of military traffic as well as heavy commercial and domestic traffic. It will also facilitate transportation of mining and agriculture product.
